= Pinoy Big Brother =

Philippine television reality show

Coordinates: 14°38′20″N 121°02′05″E

- Title card in 2026
- Genre: Reality competition
- Created by: John de Mol Jr.
- Based on: Big Brother by John de Mol Jr.
- Directed by: Jon Raymond Moll; Oliver B. Torres; Jay Klio Bermudez
- Presented by: Hosts
- Starring: Pinoy Big Brother housemates
- Opening theme: Theme songs
- Country of origin: Philippines
- Original language: Tagalog
- No. of seasons: 20

Production
- Executive producers: Eugenio Lopez III; Charo Santos-Concio; Carlo L. Katigbak; Cory V. Vidanes; Laurenti M. Dyogi; Luis L. Andrada; Annette Gozon-Valdes; Mitzi G. Garcia
- Producers: Gabriel Niño Amaro; Patch Manela Bungubung; Ronald Faina; Oliver Torres
- Production locations: 6th floor, ELJ Communications Center, Eugenio Lopez Drive, Quezon City, Philippines
- Camera setup: Multiple-camera setup
- Running time: 30–90 minutes
- Production companies: ABS-CBN Studios (2005-present); Endemol Asia (2005-2016); Endemol Shine Group (2016-2020); Banijay Philippines (along with Banijay Rights 2020-present); GMA Entertainment Group (2025-present)

Original release
- Network: ABS-CBN
- Release: August 21, 2005 – August 4, 2019
- Network: Kapamilya Channel; A2Z
- Release: December 6, 2020 – October 26, 2024
- Network: TV5
- Release: March 8, 2021 – October 26, 2024
- Network: GMA Network
- Release: March 9, 2025 – present

Pinoy Big Brother (PBB) is a Philippine television reality competition show produced by ABS-CBN Studios and based on the Dutch reality television franchise Big Brother. The series is owned and produced by ABS-CBN, which holds the exclusive Philippine franchise rights to the format.

The program originally aired on ABS-CBN from August 21, 2005, to August 4, 2019, with Willie Revillame, Toni Gonzaga, and Mariel Rodriguez as its first hosts. Following ABS-CBN’s broadcast shutdown in 2020, the show returned via Kapamilya Channel and Kapamilya Online Live on December 6, 2020, as part of its Primetime Bida and Yes Weekend lineup. It later expanded its reach through blocktime and content distribution arrangements, airing on TV5, and since March 9, 2025, on GMA Network under ABS-CBN’s programming partnership.

The series is currently broadcast on GMA Network for free television viewers in the Philippines and is simultaneously streamed on iWant, Kapamilya Online Live and Kapuso Stream for online audiences. Internationally, it aired via The Filipino Channel and GMA Pinoy TV.

Despite being shown across multiple networks, Pinoy Big Brother remains an ABS-CBN intellectual property and continues to be produced by ABS-CBN Studios. Its latest season is co-produced with GMA Network, marking the first joint reality show collaboration between the two networks. The show stands as the longest-running reality television series in the Philippines, having aired 11 main seasons, 4 celebrity editions, and 4 teen editions over the past two decades. The recent season are hosted by Bianca Gonzalez, Robi Domingo, Melai Cantiveros, Enchong Dee, Alexa Ilacad, Gabbi Garcia, and Michael Sager.

== Overview ==
The original logo used from 2005 to 2006

The 2011 iteration of the original series logo from 2005 to 2015

Generic eye in use from 2018 to 2021

Generic eye in use from 2021 to 2025

Generic eye used in Celebrity Collab Edition (2025)

=== Format ===
It follows the same premise as its many foreign counterparts around the world wherein a number of Filipinos volunteered to live inside a house for a certain number of days.

The elimination process in the show is the reverse of the original Dutch format. At the start of the elimination process, the "housemates" (as the contestants are referred to) vote for which two (sometimes more if there are ties or if Big Brother hands out an automatic nomination) fellow housemates they should eliminate. Once these nominations are chosen, the viewer votes come into play. For a week, viewers are asked to vote, via SMS or voice messaging through PLDT's hotline (later abolished in favor of vote cards), or online, for whoever they wanted to stay longer in the house (using the vote-to-save format). In some cases, the Vote-to-Evict format is used, with the housemate garnering the most percentage of evict votes from the public is evicted from the house, or a combination of the two (Save-Evict) may be implemented. The housemate with the fewest viewer votes (or highest for vote-to-evict) is eliminated. At the final week, the one with the most viewer votes (using the vote-to-win voting format) will win the grand prize package. It usually includes house and lot, a car, a business franchise, home appliances, and a holiday, and is given the title of Big Winner.

Aside from the regular seasons involving civilian adults, the show has also aired three other special versions:

- Celebrity editions: Commercial models, actors and actresses, radio and TV show hosts, musicians, sports and fashion personalities, and even politicians volunteer to reside in the house for a certain number of days, and the duration of this particular version of the show is lesser compared to the regular seasons. Celebrity housemates, like many counterparts abroad, play for charity, aside from themselves. Prizes given away from edition to edition can vary, but basically, the cash prize an edition's winner can receive is the same as the prize for that winner's chosen charity organization, i.e. the winner and his/her charity each win the same amount.
- Teen editions: Adolescents aged 13 to 19 years old from different cities in the Philippines and sometimes even from certain overseas countries with sizable Filipino communities reside in the house. Other factors are disregarded; in-school and out-of-school youths, natural-born Filipinos and adolescents with a mixture of Filipino and foreign blood, those with intact and broken families, and even teenage single parents may be eligible as long one passes the age requirement and has a background worth exploring during the edition's run. This edition is usually done in the Philippine "summer" months of late March to early June. During this time, temperatures in the country are at their highest and most students are out of school; a regular school year in the Philippines runs from June of one year to March of the next.
- Special/merged editions: More known as the "All In" twist, special editions feature a group of civilian adults, celebrities, and civilian teenagers enter the House to compete. These seasons are referred to as "special" editions because this edition was a Big Brother first worldwide. This edition was introduced in 2014 with Pinoy Big Brother: All In. Currently, these special editions are divided into the following variants:
  - Celebrities, Adults, and Teens: All three versions of the series are merged into one house. Civilian adult, celebrity, and civilian teen housemates would compete altogether for the prize. This was introduced on All In, and was then used on Lucky 7 and Kumunity Season 10.
  - Celebrities and Adults: Only a combination of civilian adults and celebrity housemates would be merged into one house to compete. This format was first used on Collab 3.0.
  - Adults and Teens: Only a combination of civilian adults and teen housemates would be merged into one house to compete. This format was first used on 737 and was later used on Otso, Connect and Gen 11.
  - Multi-part editions: These are combined editions that appear throughout a single edition's run, with each season having a distinct format from the others. Some of these feature celebrities, while others do not. The only difference is that all winners and finalists from each batch return to compete for a set number of spots in the finale (with the exception of 737 which had separate finalists and two winners). This edition was first introduced in 2015 with 737 (two parts), and was also used by Lucky 7 (four parts), Otso (five parts), and Kumunity Season 10 (four parts).

Some editions feature formats inspired by other international versions of Big Brother, including the following:

- Duos: In the third celebrity season, housemates are divided into two groups, with each housemate from one group paired with a housemate from the other. Similar to 2-in-1 housemates, these pairs (known as duos in the show) will compete, nominate, strategize, and face eviction together until the finale. However, pairings were shuffled periodically through tasks and challenges throughout the season. This format was previously used in the joint Nigerian and South African season, All Star season of the Spanish version, and in the joint Dutch and Belgian season.
- Groups: For the fourth celebrity season, the housemates were divided into groups of equal quantities, each led by an assigned leader. The leaders selected their members, and the groups competed in tasks, challenges, and nominations collectively—meaning the fate of one member depended on that of the entire group. Before each nomination ceremony, a Ligtask Challenge was held, granting immunity to the winning group for that round. The remaining groups then nominated other groups, and the one with the highest number of nomination points faced public voting. From the nominated group, the housemate from each agency with the lowest percentage of votes was evicted. This twist is similar to the Clique twist from Big Brother U.S. (season 11).

=== The House ===
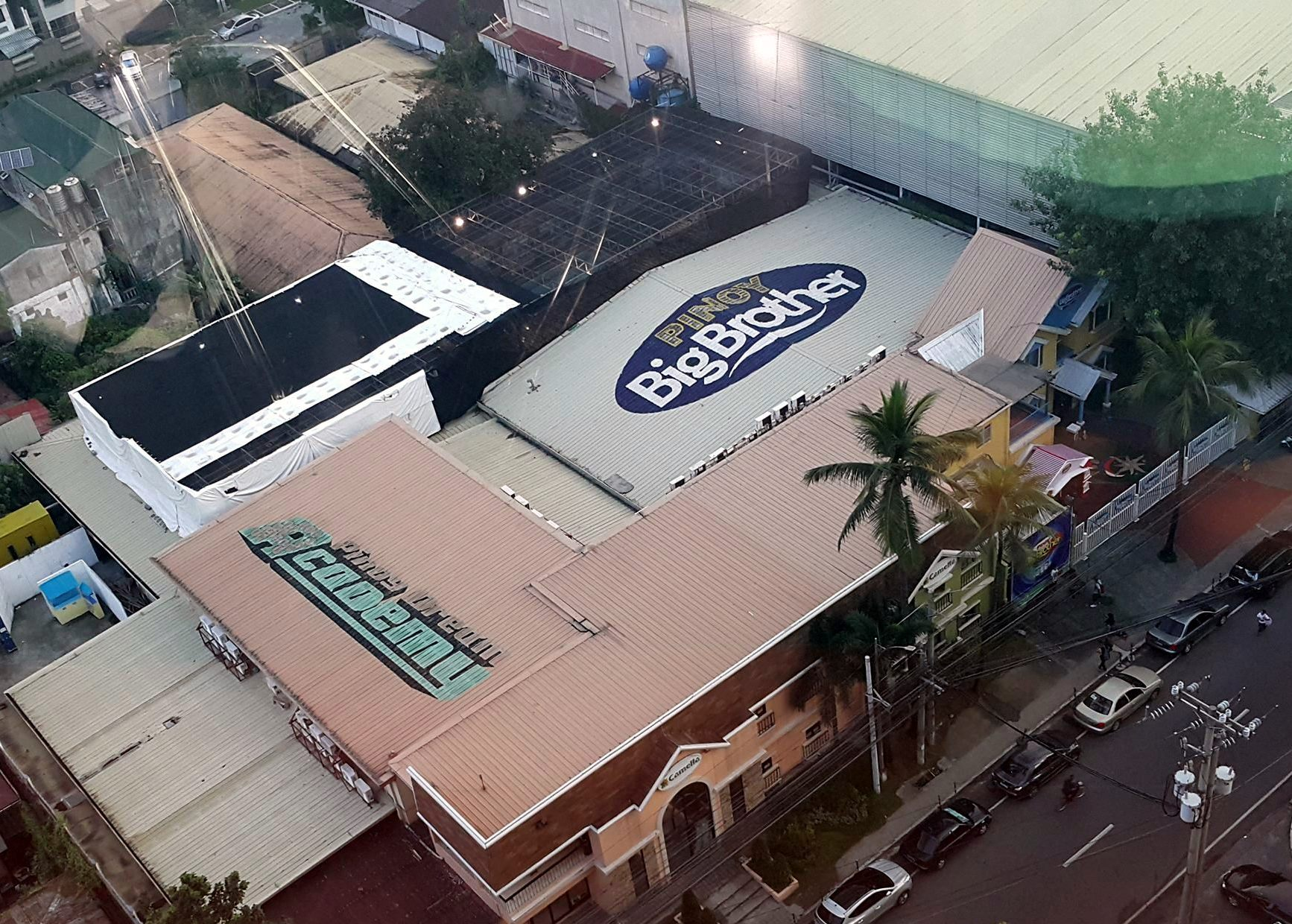
The Pinoy Big Brother studios as seen from the 12th floor of ELJ Communications Center. On the lower left of the picture is the facade designed for the former reality television show Pinoy Dream Academy, on the upper left is the Pinoy Big Brother activity area, while on the upper right of the picture are the swimming pool area and the Pinoy Big Brother multi-purpose hall.

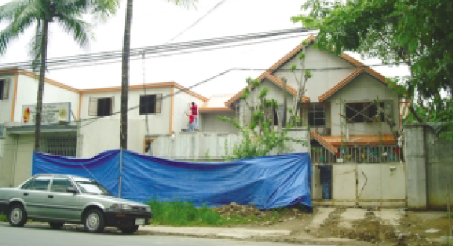
The Pinoy Big Brother House during its construction. It sits in a 1,400-sq. m. property.

The location of the Pinoy Big Brother House used to occupy an old house; it was demolished in order to give way for the show. The house was built within 79 days in 2005 and was built by 50 men round-the-clock. The house is actually a large, fully air-conditioned studio with a facade made to look like an ideal middle-class house. It is located just in front of the ELJ Communications Center in Eugenio Lopez Jr. Drive, Diliman, Quezon City. The leftmost part of the facade was designed for another reality show franchise called Pinoy Dream Academy until 2011 when it was entirely removed in favor of Big Brother. The interior of the studio is designed to look like a real house with themes and interior design changing for every season of the show. The studio is also designed to capture every "housemate's" activities with state-of-the-art surveillance cameras and microphones. The house is surrounded by walls with two-way mirrors to allow cameramen to directly shoot from behind of the mirrors. The studio has backlots that are utilized for several purposes depending on the season's theme. Currently, the backlots are utilized as an activity area, swimming pool area, and multi-purpose hall. Previously, it was also used for a garden, a resort, a concert hall for Pinoy Dream Academy, an eviction hall, and even a slum. The multi-purpose hall, in particular, is used by the ABS-CBN Foundation as a relief goods storage facility during calamities. The house's set-up is that of a bungalow, even though the facade is obviously designed as a two-storey house. The second floor houses a state-of-the-art master control room and several amenities designed for the program's crew. Although any form of communication from the outside world is banned inside the house, there is a large flat-screen television set in the living room, used for only 2 purposes:

- To show any video Big Brother wanted to show to any or all housemates, especially that of the TV Mass every Sunday (contrary to reports early in the first season that a priest would visit them; later on, a priest unseen by viewers would visit them), and
- To announce the names of nominees for eviction directly to the housemates and the person evicted from the house. The housemates saw hosts talk to them during the nomination and eviction nights.

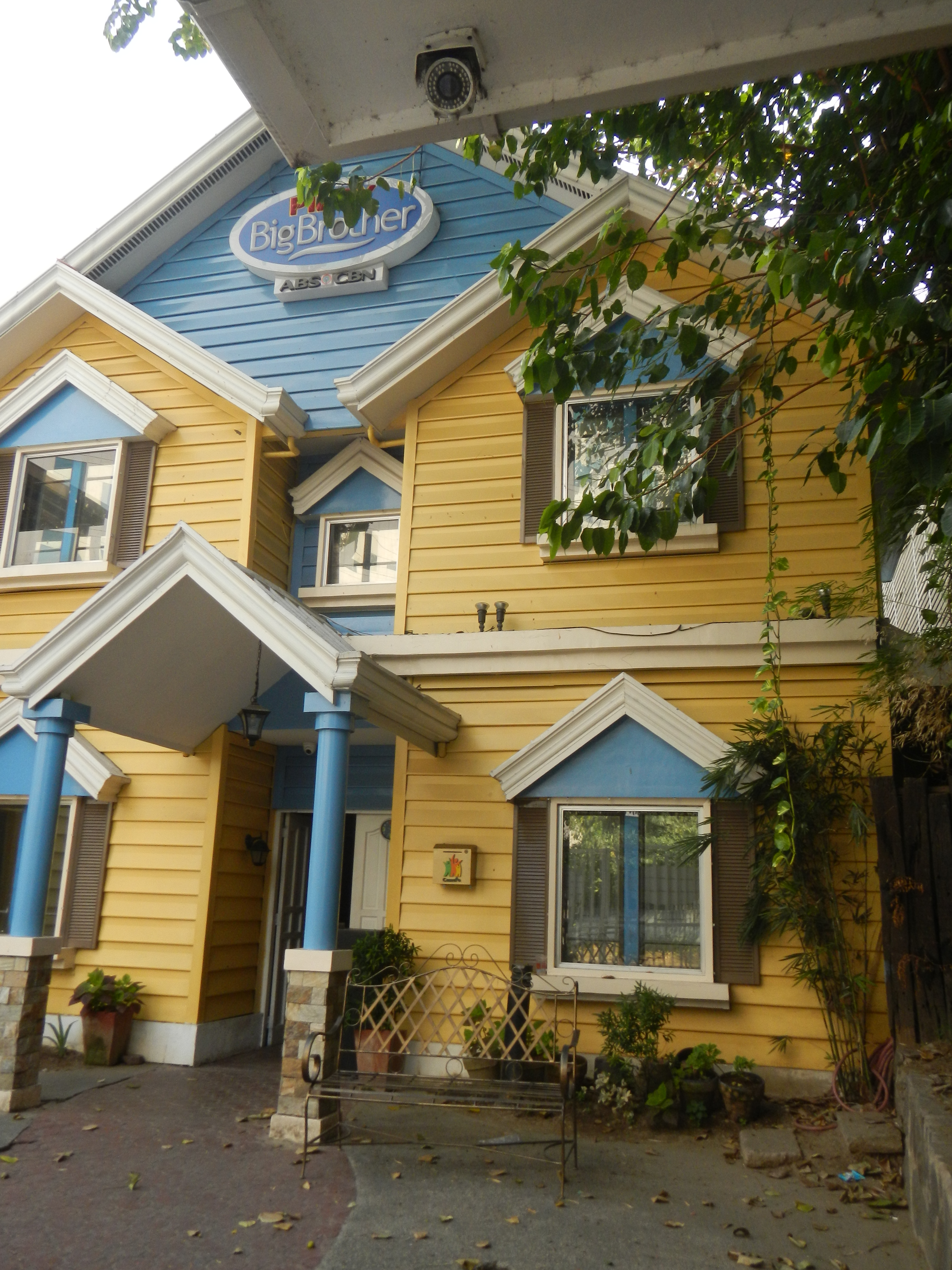
2015 Façade

To complete the setup, 26 surveillance cameras are positioned all over the house to watch the housemates' every move, including the bathroom. For modesty's sake, images from the bathroom will be shown if the bathroom is used for any purpose other than bathing and using the toilet.

The set up of the house, especially when shown on television, makes the illusion that it is a one-storey house. But anyone who passes by the house can easily notice that its facade is that of a two-storey house. That is because the second storey houses parts of the control room. The actual front doors to the house area are actually further inside.

The house interior was rebuilt for the second season, the changes are the following:

- The number of cameras has been increased to 42.
- There was a secret room built behind the confession room and a large activity area leading from the garden.
- The house has a prayer room rather than just an altar.
- The flat screen monitor found in the living area is now used to call any housemate.
- The front door now leads to the Eviction Hall next door.
- Instead of watching a TV mass, the housemates have a spiritual session with Coney Reyes, the show's spiritual adviser. This has been done since the first Celebrity Edition.

For Double Up, the house was divided into two different, yet equally furnished "houses." The changes are the following:

- The house was completely rebuilt from the ground up, new set up, and larger space.
- The guardians' area from the second teen edition was renovated to accommodate the season's twist.
- The housemates that are evicted every week exit the house through the confession room.
- Eviction takes place right outside of the Big Brother House.

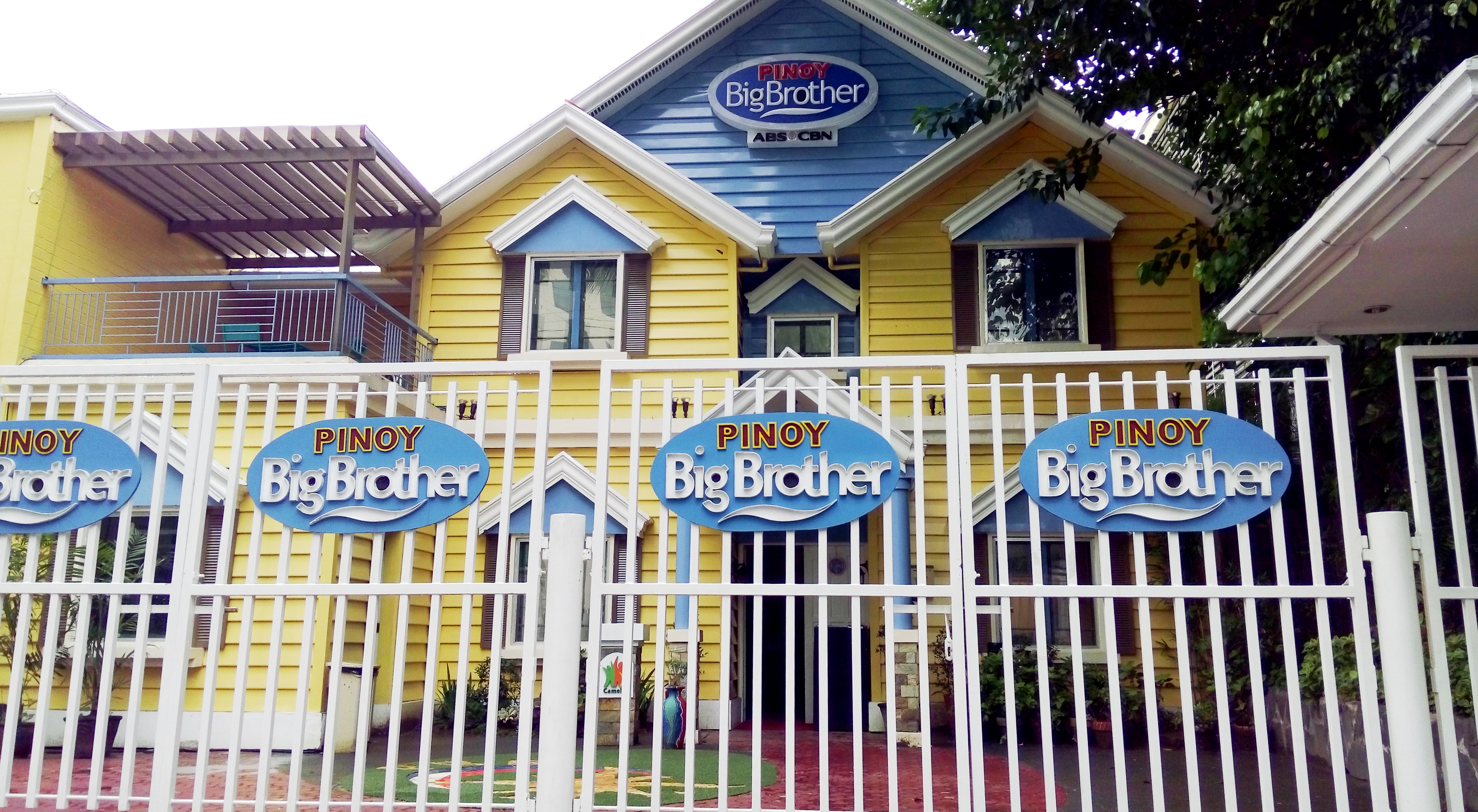
The Big Brother House after its renovation in 2011. In 2015, the former Pinoy Dream Academy facade next door became part of the Big Brother house as an extended facade.

For Unlimited, the facade of the house was fully renovated, and the gates were removed. The outside of the Big Brother house still served as the venue for evictions. The Big Brother house was still divided into two different themed houses yet both equally furnished. Both houses have separate confession rooms. The garden was removed, and the pool was retained and was considered a separate area and was called the Resort. The area was used for some time for Big Brother's rewards and tasks to the housemates, and was a venue for some House Battles. The activity area was retained and was renovated several times in order to accommodate the season's twists. Initially, it was used as a temporary shelter for the initial group of housemates and was themed after a typical urban slum house.

For 737, the former Pinoy Dream Academy facade became part of the Big Brother House as an extended facade. Also, the eviction now took place inside the ABS-CBN studios rather than outside the facade. The evicted housemate will be transferred by a car leading to the Eviction Studio.

For Otso, for the first time in the franchise's history, the entire one-way mirror system used for filming were removed and replaced by real walls. The number of cameras were increased to 50 and were upgraded to robotic cameras.

The other facade of the House (also known as "House B") was demolished in May 2023 because the lease agreement for the said space had expired that year and it was impractical for the management to renew it. The said House was formerly used also as the academy of the now-defunct reality singing-competition show, Pinoy Dream Academy. In both Connect and Kumunity Season 10 seasons, the "House B" also served as living quarters for the show's production staff, the show's office, brainstorm space, mini studio, and pantry as both seasons occurred during the peak of the COVID-19 pandemic in the Philippines.

In March 2026, the Pinoy Big Brother house were set to move to a new location for the twelfth main season after 20 years in Quezon City. In October 2026, the Gina Lopez building (formerly served as headquarters of Bantay Bata and ABS-CBN Foundation) will be used as the façade of the new Big Brother house.

=== Primers ===
To prepare the viewers for the program's run, two primers were aired. The first was Eto na si Kuya! (Here Comes Big Brother), which talked about the essentials of the franchise and its success around the world. In the second primer, entitled Ang Bahay ni Kuya (Big Brother's House), Mariel and Toni indirectly gave the viewers a tour of the Big Brother house and its rooms, along with the control center and the confession booth. It also featured a dry run where 12 of the network's talents stayed in the house for 24 hours and experienced the challenges and tests the housemates would experience at the start of the actual run.

=== Theme songs ===
Pinoy Ako

The show had its theme song called "Pinoy Ako" (English: I'm a Filipino) composed by Jonathan Manalo and Clem Castro, and performed by Orange and Lemons, in the album Strike Whilst The Iron Is Hot, which became the basis for much of the background music used in the show. Numerous versions of the theme song were used, including those of rock band Cebalo for Season 2, Toni Gonzaga for Unlimited, rock band Reo Brothers for All In, a rendition from OPM veteran Rico Blanco now entitled "Pinoy Tayo" (English: We are Filipino) for Kumunity Season 10's adult and Biga-10 batches, and a remixed version of the Orange and Lemons original for Gen 11.

Sikat ang Pinoy

"Sikat ang Pinoy" (English: Filipinos are Famous), composed by Jonathan Manalo, and performed by Toni Gonzaga and Season 1 ex-housemate Sam Milby, was mainly used for its celebrity editions. Another rendition of the song was sung by Pinoy Dream Academy winner Yeng Constantino and finalist Emman Abatayo, which was used during the run of the Celebrity Edition 2. A third rendition of the song by OPM band Agsunta with rap lyrics provided by Pinoy rapper Kritiko was introduced for Kumunity Season 10. The latest rendition was performed by Darren Espanto and Julie Anne San Jose for the Celebrity Collab Edition.

Kabataang Pinoy

"Kabataang Pinoy" (English: Filipino Teens), composed by Jonathan Manalo and Jazz Nicolas, and performed by the Itchyworms, was mainly used for teen editions since 2006. Another rendition was performed by Pinoy collective Nameless Kids, introduced in November 2021 for Kumunity Season 10, followed by a third version by a collaboration of P-pop groups Bini and SB19 in March 2022 and eventually became the season's teen edition theme song. The latest rendition was performed by P-pop groups BGYO and Cloud 7 that became the theme song of Celebrity Collab Edition 2.0, which featured teen celebrity housemates—the first and only standalone celebrity edition to do so.

Other theme songs

A new theme song was introduced in Otso entitled "Otso Na" (English: Otso Now), performed by Toni Gonzaga and Alex Gonzaga; worth noting is that the song includes a medley and the chorus of "Pinoy Ako". Composed in the same manner as "Otso Na", a new theme song written and performed by Otso ex-housemates Jem Macatuno, Shawntel Cruz, Lie Resposposa and Kiara Takahashi called "Connected Na Tayo" (English: We are Connected) was used for Connect.

== Hosts ==
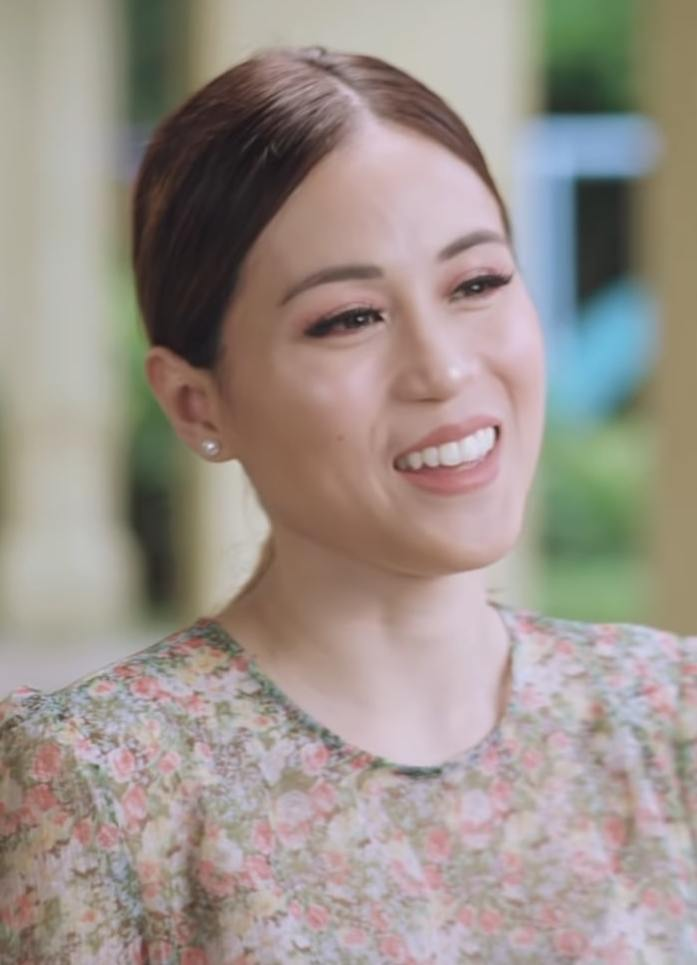
Toni Gonzaga was a mainstay host of Pinoy Big Brother for 15 seasons, having been its host since its inaugural season in 2005 up to her exit in 2022.

Originally, television personality and comedian Willie Revillame was the main eviction host of the show, along with young up-and-coming personalities Mariel Rodriguez and Toni Gonzaga. Gonzaga hosted the primetime telecast which chronicles the events of the day before (unless an episode is telecast live). Rodriguez, on the other hand, hosted the late night edition called Pinoy Big Brother: Uplate, which updates anything viewers missed in the primetime telecast, as well as what to look forward in the next one. Revillame hosted the live telecast of the eviction and the public revelation of the nomination for evictees, but only for the first season. He left the program after the inaugural season due to the ULTRA stampede.

Luis Manzano took over Revillame's place for the Celebrity Edition 1 and later returned in Teen Edition Plus in 2008.

In Teen Edition 1, TV host and Celebrity Edition 1 ex-housemate Bianca Gonzalez took over Rodriguez for Teen Edition: Update, and PBB: Uplate as the latter became primetime host, whilst Gonzaga only hosted the Big Night prior to other commitments.

Rodriguez left the show in 2010 prior to her transfer to TV5 and was replaced by former teen housemate and Teen Edition Plus runner-up Robi Domingo as co-presenter from Unlimited onwards.

Originally, Martin Concio, son of ABS-CBN president, CEO and COO Charo Santos-Concio, was slated to join the hosting lineup but later backed out. Later, former celebrity housemate and Celebrity Edition 1 runner-up John Prats joined Gonzaga, Gonzalez, and Domingo as hosts for Teen Edition 4.

In All In, Slater Young was introduced as one of the hosts, but was later moved to host that season's new online show, with Teen Edition 4's Joj and Jai Agpangan. He was then replaced by Toni's sister Alex Gonzaga, who only hosted the first night of the season (due to her surprise inclusion as a housemate and later houseguest). Once her time as houseguest came to an end, she continued to host PBB for its Uber show only.

In 737, Enchong Dee was introduced as a new host; however, as part of the tradition of the program, he had to stay in the House first and experience how the housemates are experiencing their stay inside the House. He later was allowed to exit the house; afterwards, he returned to his hosting stint as the show's hourly updater. On the other hand, Mariel Rodriguez returned to the show after five years to play as the last celebrity houseguest and later host the Big Nights marking her significant return as host, similar to that of what happened to Gonzaga in Teen Edition 1 Big Night.

In Lucky 7, Gonzaga and Rodriguez both went on maternity leave; the former returned to hosting duties prior to the entry of the Dream Team.

In Otso, former Big Winners Melai Cantiveros (from Double Up) and Kim Chiu (from Teen Edition 1) joined Gonzaga and Domingo as new hosts, while Alex Gonzaga returned as a permanent co-host for the season. Rodriguez did not return to host this season to focus on hosting It's Showtime and give more parenting time for her daughter. Gonzalez did not host during the tenure of the first teen batch as she was pregnant and later gave birth to her second child at that time, but later returned to host upon the entry of the first adult batch of housemates.

In Connect, 737 adult ex-housemate Richard Juan joined to host online updates; while Enchong Dee returned to host online contents for the show, together with Cantiveros (however, their appearances were only occasional). Gonzaga, Gonzalez and Domingo reprised their roles as hosts, with the latter two also hosting online companion shows for the program. Chiu, Edward Barber, and Maymay Entrata were earlier reported to host online contents for the program (with Chiu and Entrata having joined the official launch and the Big Night respectively, while Barber only appeared on the Big Night, acting the comedy sketch as one of the housemates), but were never seen doing their hosting stints in the succeeding events of the show. Alex Gonzaga, on the other hand, did not return to the show due to her transfer to Brightlight Productions' noontime show Lunch Out Loud.

In Kumunity Season 10, Gonzaga, Gonzalez, and Domingo reprised their roles as hosts; Gonzalez, Domingo, Dee, and Cantiveros host online companion shows for the program on weekdays, while Otso Batch 4 ex-housemate Sky Quizon host the online weekend shows. Juan reprised his role in hosting online updates, with Dee, Cantiveros, and Barber substituting him occasionally in some updates at the start of the Adult Edition. Chiu and Barber joined the season's official launch, but was not seen doing their hosting stints in the succeeding events of the show, esp. Chiu as she also serve as co-host of It's Showtime. On February 9, 2022, during the Adult Edition, Gonzaga stepped down from her role as the show's main host, and endorsed Gonzalez to assume the latter's duties. On February 12, 2022, during the adult edition's second eviction night, Gonzalez, Domingo, Chiu, Cantiveros, and Dee were introduced as the Pamilya ni Kuya as Gonzalez leads as the main host.

In Gen 11, Gonzalez, Domingo, Dee, Cantiveros, and Chiu reprised their roles as hosts for the season; they were joined by former Kumunity Season 10 celebrity housemate Alexa Ilacad.

In Celebrity Collab Edition, Gonzalez, Domingo, Dee, Cantiveros, Chiu, and Ilacad reprised their hosting roles for the season. They were then joined by GMA Network artists Gabbi Garcia and Mavy Legaspi after their hosting roles were announced by their network on February 9 and 12, 2025, respectively. Garcia also hosted the companion show, "Updates", while Legaspi joined Ilacad in hosting "The OnlineVerse". All of them reprised their hosting roles for Celebrity Collab Edition 2.0 on October 25, 2025, with Luis Manzano returning to the show after 17 years.

In Collab 3.0, Gonzalez, Domingo, Dee, Cantiveros, Garcia, and Ilacad reprised their hosting roles for the season, with Celebrity Collab Edition 1 housemate Michael Sager as a newest addition of roster of hosts. Chiu was in hiatus after eight years of hosting.

Legend

Main Season

Celebrity Season

Teen Season

Hosts timeline
Hosts	Season																			
Hosts	1	CE 1	TE 1	2	CE 2	TE 2	3	TE 3	4	TE 4	5	6	7	8	9	10	11	CCE 1	CCE 2	12
Toni Gonzaga																				
Mariel Rodriguez																				
Willie Revillame																				
Luis Manzano																				
Bianca Gonzalez																				
Robi Domingo																				
John Prats																				
Alex Gonzaga																				
Enchong Dee																				
Kim Chiu																				
Melai Cantiveros																				
Richard Juan																				
Alexa Ilacad																				
Gabbi Garcia																				
Mavy Legaspi																				
Michael Sager																				

=== Other hosts ===
Asia Agcaoili spearheaded the show for the viewers of Studio 23. Her show, called Pinoy Big Brother on Studio 23: Si Kuya, KaBarkada Mo (English: Pinoy Big Brother on Studio 23: Your Big Brother, Your Buddy), not only featured snippets from the primetime telecast the night before, but also featured opinion polls both from the man on the street and those sending SMS, spoof segments, unaired videos, and feed from inside the house (either live feed or footage taped earlier). Studio 23 has stopped the practice since the second Celebrity Edition and instead resorted to airing the delayed late morning/early afternoon feeds.

Talk show host Boy Abunda hosted the post-season documentaries, was often invited to conduct interviews, and appeared on the Big Night to which he last appeared in Otso. It featured issues and controversies about the housemates.

== Series overview ==
The show has spawned eleven regular (or main) seasons, four celebrity seasons, and four teen seasons since it began airing on August 21, 2005. In the entire 2,389 aggregate days of filming (including those days where the show did not air for any reason, such as the observance of the Holy Week and Election Day), 450 housemates entered the house, 22 of whom were crowned Big Winners. The most recent winners are Caprice Cayetano and Lella Ford from Pinoy Big Brother: Celebrity Collab Edition 2.0.

Legend

Regular Season

Celebrity Season

Teen Season

Mixed Season

Season		Days	No. of Housemates	Winner	Runner-up	Third Placer	Fourth Placer	Original airing			Note
No.	Title	Days	No. of Housemates	Winner	Runner-up	Third Placer	Fourth Placer	First aired	Last aired	Network	Note
Main Season
1	Season 1	112	13	Nene Tamayo	Jayson Gainza	Cassandra Ponti	Uma Khouny	August 21, 2005	December 10, 2005	ABS-CBN	(Note: First regular season. Only season that featured Willie Revillame as host of the show. First season to feature the 100-second session.)
2	Season 2	126	18	Bea Saw	Mickey Perz	Wendy Valdez	Gee-Ann Abrahan	February 25, 2007	June 30, 2007	ABS-CBN	(Note: First season to have Big Brother Swap; Introduced the Secret housemates twist and Immunity Challenges.)
3	Double Up	133	26	Melai Cantiveros	Paul Jake Castillo	Jason Francisco	Johan Santos	October 4, 2009	February 13, 2010	ABS-CBN	(Note: Introduced two separate twin housemates that secretly act as one person. First season to adapt two separate houses for two separate group of housemates. Introduced the Vote to Save and Evict voting system. Introduced the Big Jump to the Big Night. First season to have five housemates in the finale instead of the usual four.)
4	Unlimited	155	37	Slater Young	Pamu Pamorada	Joseph Biggel	Paco Evangelista	October 29, 2011	March 31, 2012	ABS-CBN	(Note: First season to feature three separate houses. Introduced the reserved housemates twist (wherein each shortlisted auditionees were given a chance to become an official housemate), and challenges that needs to be done outside the house. The only season to have two separate programs ("Unliday" and "Unlinight") for two separate groups of housemates.)
5	All In	120	19	Daniel Matsunaga	Maris Racal	Jane Oineza	Vickie Rushton	April 27, 2014	August 24, 2014	ABS-CBN	(Note: The first in the show and in the entire Big Brother franchise to have a mix of teen, adult and celebrity housemates. First season to have a Philippine celebrity with no Filipino blood (Daniel Matsunaga) and first to have twins (Fourth and Fifth Pagotan) that are not considered as a 2-in-1 housemate. Introduced the public nominations (BBN), Instasave and the two powers granted to an evicted housemate. First time to have a Big Night on a Sunday slot instead of Saturday.)
6	737	142	11 (Teens)	Jimboy Martin	Ylona Garcia	Franco Rodriguez	Bailey May	June 20, 2015	November 8, 2015	ABS-CBN	(Note: The first in the show and in the entire Big Brother franchise to have two editions, teens and regulars thereby having two Big Winners that ran through continuously in one season. Return of Mariel Rodriguez as host after five years. First time to have a two-day Big Night.)
6	737	142	16 (Adults)	Miho Nishida	Tommy Esguerra	Roger Lucero	Dawn Chang	June 20, 2015	November 8, 2015	ABS-CBN	(Note: The first in the show and in the entire Big Brother franchise to have two editions, teens and regulars thereby having two Big Winners that ran through continuously in one season. Return of Mariel Rodriguez as host after five years. First time to have a two-day Big Night.)
7	Lucky 7	235	30	Maymay Entrata	Kisses Delavin	Yong Muhajil	Edward Barber	July 11, 2016	March 5, 2017	ABS-CBN	(Note: The first in the history of the franchise to have four fused editions namely Celebrity, Teens, Adult, and a Dream Team. The first time since 2007 to have a batch of celebrities to enter the House; also the first time in the history of the show that the housemates were housed in a foreign Big Brother House, in Vietnam. The first season where nominated housemates will undergo Ligtask challenges instead of the public vote during usual eviction nights until the seven housemates in each batch remain and to introduce a back-to-back nomination and eviction night and a flash voting period. The first season to have housemates that were evicted 3 times in an entire season (Elisse Joson and Baninay Bautista). The first edition to have 7 finalists (not separated in batches) to be competing in the Big Night.)
8	Otso	268	58	Yamyam Gucong	Kiara Takahashi	Lou Yanong	Andre Brouillette	November 10, 2018	August 4, 2019	ABS-CBN	(Note: The first season to have four separate batches of housemates to enter the house. Also includes a separate house of hopeful auditionees per batch who are set to replace a housemate when one gets evicted or decides to make a voluntary exit. The season having the most housemates overall, and the most number of teen housemates. The longest season of Pinoy Big Brother, reaching 267 days surpassing the record of Lucky 7 by only 32 days. The first edition to have 8 finalists (not separated in batches) to be competing in the Big Night.)
9	Connect	99	18	Liofer Pinatacan	Andrea Abaya	Kobie Brown	Jie-Ann Armero	December 6, 2020	March 14, 2021	Kapamilya Channel, A2Z	(Note: The first season not to air on ABS-CBN and the first season to hold its auditions completely online (via Kumu). Also the first season not to have Uber as a companion show on TV; instead, all companion shows were streamed live online. The shortest special season of Pinoy Big Brother with the housemates residing for a total of 99 Days. This season introduced the twist that give HoH holders the power to exclusively vote other housemates for eviction (also known as Supercharged Power). First season of Pinoy Big Brother not feature a text and online vote to determine the finalists but through a series of challenges. On the final week of this season, the first time for the show to simulcast on TV5.)
10	Kumunity Season 10	226	46	Anji Salvacion	Isabel Laohoo	Samantha Bernardo	Rob Blackburn	October 16, 2021	May 29, 2022	Kapamilya Channel, A2Z	(Note: The first season to air at early primetime slot (the show aired at 5:45 p.m. (PST) on weekdays); introduced the 48-Hour Unlimited Voting System; and the final season for Toni Gonzaga as the main host of the Philippine franchise.)
11	Gen 11	99	18	Fyang Smith	Rain Celmar	Kolette Madelo	Kai Montinola	July 20, 2024	October 26, 2024	Kapamilya Channel, A2Z, TV5	(Note: The first full season without Toni Gonzaga as the main host and the first full season to air on TV5 since the finale week of the Connect season. It is also the first season to feature a same-sex couple housemates and to feature all-female finalists.)
12	Collab 3.0	TBA	24	Current season				October 24, 2026	TBA	GMA Network	(Note: First main season on GMA Network. First season to set at ELJ Communications Center in Quezon City. First mixed season to feature regular adult and celebrity housemates (excluding teens).)
Celebrity Season
1	Celebrity Edition 1	56	14	Keanna Reeves	John Prats	Bianca Gonzalez	Zanjoe Marudo	February 5, 2006	April 1, 2006	ABS-CBN	(Note: First season to feature celebrities as housemates. Introduced prizes for the housemates chosen charities.)
2	Celebrity Edition 2	84	16	Ruben Gonzaga	Riza Santos	Gaby dela Merced	Will Devaughn	October 14, 2007	January 5, 2008	ABS-CBN	(Note: This season also introduced a task that span the entire season, the inclusion of two-in-one housemates and the Head of Household twist.)
3	Celebrity Collab Edition	119	20	Brent Manalo & Mika Salamanca	Ralph de Leon & Will Ashley	Charlie Fleming & Esnyr Ranollo	AZ Martinez & River Joseph	March 9, 2025	July 5, 2025	GMA Network	(Note: The first full season to aired on GMA Network. It was the third standalone celebrity season after 17 years from the second celebrity season and the first non-mixed season since All In. It features celebrities signed to talent agencies—Star Magic and Sparkle GMA Artist Center as housemates. The season having the most number of celebrity housemates. First season since 737 season having two Big Winners that ran through continuously in one season each from two agencies. First edition to have a 3-point nomination system and first edition to have a duo system. First edition to used wildcard since Lucky Season 7. First edition to air within six days per week instead of seven. First season to feature four duo finalists, including two individual wildcards.)
4	Celebrity Collab Edition 2.0	127	10 (Kapuso)	Caprice Cayetano	Heath Jornales	Ashley Sarmiento	Princess Aliyah	October 25, 2025	February 28, 2026	GMA Network	(Note: The first season to entirely featured teen celebrities as housemates. The longest non-main season with a span of 127 days, surpassing PBB Celebrity Collab Edition by 8 days. The second season of Luis Manzano as host since Teen Edition Plus in 2008. First edition to have a group system. The last edition in a Big Brother house in Quezon City after 20 years.)
4	Celebrity Collab Edition 2.0	127	10 (Kapamilya)	Lella Ford	Krystal Mejes	Joaquin Arce	Miguel Vergara	October 25, 2025	February 28, 2026	GMA Network	(Note: The first season to entirely featured teen celebrities as housemates. The longest non-main season with a span of 127 days, surpassing PBB Celebrity Collab Edition by 8 days. The second season of Luis Manzano as host since Teen Edition Plus in 2008. First edition to have a group system. The last edition in a Big Brother house in Quezon City after 20 years.)
Teen Season
1	Teen Edition 1	42	14	Kim Chiu	Mikee Lee	Gerald Anderson	Clare Cabiguin	April 23, 2006	June 3, 2006	ABS-CBN	(Note: First season to have teens, aged 15 to 18, as housemates. Primetime host Toni Gonzaga only hosted the season's Big Night. First season to have a finale task outside the house.)
2	Teen Edition Plus	77	14	Ejay Falcon	Robi Domingo	Nicole Uysiuseng	Beauty Gonzalez	March 23, 2008	June 7, 2008	ABS-CBN	(Note: First season to add a subtitle to the name of the show. The season also featured the Ateneo-La Salle rivalry, and introduced the Guardians and the House Player twists.)
3	Teen Clash 2010	78	27	James Reid	Ryan Bang	Fretzie Bercede	Devon Seron	April 10, 2010	June 26, 2010	ABS-CBN	(Note: First season to introduce non-Filipino teens as housemates. Also the first season to have a non-Filipino citizen winner. First season to have six housemates in the finale instead of the usual four.)
4	Teen Edition 4	91	14	Myrtle Sarrosa	Karen Reyes	Roy Requejo	Jai & Joj Agpangan	April 8, 2012	July 7, 2012	ABS-CBN	(Note: The longest teen season in the entire history of the franchise. First season to have two-in-one housemates in the finale.)

== Other shows ==
=== Companion shows ===
The reality television show has, in total, three companion shows to date. The first one was Pinoy Big Brother UpLate, a late-night program of the reality show, and has been one of the most successful companion shows in the entire history of the franchise and it was replaced by Games Uplate Live. It was primarily hosted by Mariel Rodriguez, while Bianca Gonzalez took over the program once the first Teen Edition started, as the former became primetime host. This was aired as the final program of ABS-CBN from late at night to early morning, Monday to Friday, after the News & Public Affairs programs and before sign-off; and shows some updates, live feeds, and interviews. During the second regular season, the show was replaced by a late afternoon show called Pinoy Big Brother Über. The show would make its return in Pinoy Big Brother: Double Up under the name Pinoy Big Brother: Double UpLate with Bianca Gonzalez as host. After Pinoy Big Brother: Double Up, the show was not revived and was eventually replaced by Über.

The Pinoy Big Brother Über was also hosted by Mariel Rodriguez; and often Bianca Gonzalez, this is also the show's interactive portion wherein viewers can participate. The show was originally created as a replacement for UpLate as the show's main offshoot; the two programs would later become the show's co-main offshoots in third regular season. Über did not return for the Pinoy Big Brother: Unlimited season because of Mariel's departure from the show, and the new "UnliDay" edition of the show airing counterpart with its normal "UnliNight" edition. Über returned for the fourth teen season as Pinoy Big Brother: Teen Edition 4 Über 2012 onward with Bianca Gonzalez, Robi Domingo and John Prats. Also in the same Teen season, the show aired on Saturdays, known as SabadUber.

In every season of the local franchise, a short segment update show is aired every day from Mondays to Fridays. The show is called Pinoy Big Brother Update. The show provided daily happenings in the Big Brother house and introduces what will be shown in the primetime telecast. Mariel Rodriguez used to be the main Update host for the first season up to the first teen season. With the exception of second celebrity season to which Beatriz Saw was seen as the Update host, Bianca Gonzalez has been the Update host, replacing Mariel Rodriguez. Robi Domingo served as a guest host for one week during Pinoy Big Brother: Teen Clash 2010 as Bianca Gonzalez was then unavailable.

At this time, Pinoy Big Brother: 737 had an improved version as 737 Gold. On Lucky 7, 737 Gold was replaced by "PBB Vietnam: Mga Kwento ng Celebrity Housemates" during the celebrity housemates' stay in Vietnam, "PBB: Mga Kwento ng Teen Housemates" during the duration of the teens' entry, and lastly, it was replaced by "PBB: Mga Kwento ng mga Housemates ni Kuya" during the regular's entry in the house.

In Connect, there were no companion shows on television; instead, an online show called Kumunek Tayo, hosted by Melai Cantiveros and Enchong Dee for the afternoon edition, and Bianca Gonzalez and Robi Domingo for the primetime edition, aired via Kumu from their homes.

In Kumunity Season 10, three online companion shows were introduced: the first, Kumulitan, aired simultaneously with the main program on weekdays and was hosted by Melai Cantiveros and Enchong Dee, occasionally joined by Bianca Gonzalez and Robi Domingo; the second, Kumunity: G sa Gabi, aired weeknights at 11:00 p.m.; and the third, Kumulitan Weekend, hosted by Sky Quizon and Richard Juan, aired simultaneously with the program on weekends.

In Gen 11, a digital companion talk show entitled PBB Gen 11 Up that is hosted by Alexa Ilacad, Enchong Dee, Melai Cantiveros, Kim Chiu, and Robi Domingo airs every Saturday on Kapamilya Online Live on YouTube and Facebook.

In Celebrity Collab Edition, the Updates companion show are now returned to television via Pinoy Big Brother: Celebrity Collab Edition - Updates, hosted by Gabbi Garcia aired on weekdays before TiktoClock and Family Feud on GMA. A digital companion talk show entitled Pinoy Big Brother: Celebrity Collab Edition - The OnlineVerse, aired during the Weekends on Kapamilya Online Live and Kapuso Stream on YouTube and Facebook.

In Collab 3.0, there is no Updates companion show in television. But the OnlineVerse is still available online, hosted by Alexa Ilacad and Michael Sager every Saturday.

The Companion shows and their hosts with their monikers:
- Pinoy Big Brother Season 1
  - Mariel Rodriguez, "Ang Kapitbahay ni Kuya"
- Pinoy Big Brother: Celebrity Edition
  - Mariel Rodriguez, "Ang Kapitbahay ni Kuya"
- Pinoy Big Brother: Teen Edition
  - Mariel Rodriguez, "Ang Kapitbahay ni Kuya"
- Pinoy Big Brother: Season 2
  - Bianca Gonzales, "Ang Dating Boarder ni Kuya"
- Pinoy Big Brother: Celebrity Edition 2
  - Beatriz Saw, "Ang Official Kuyarazzi"
- Pinoy Big Brother: Teen Edition Plus
  - Bianca Gonzales, "Ang Dating Boarder ni Kuya"
- Pinoy Big Brother: Double Up
  - Bianca Gonzales, "Ang Dating Boarder ni Kuya"
- Pinoy Big Brother: Teen Clash 2010
  - Bianca Gonzales, "Ang Dating Boarder ni Kuya"
  - Robi Domingo, "Ang Ka-Tropa ni Kuya"
- Pinoy Big Brother: Unlimited
  - Toni Gonzaga, "Ang Ka-Chika ni Kuya"
  - Bianca Gonzales, "Ang Dating Boarder ni Kuya"
  - Robi Domingo, "Ang Tambay sa Bahay ni Kuya"
- Pinoy Big Brother: 737
  - Enchong Dee, "Ang Homeboy ni Kuya"
- Pinoy Big Brother: Connect
  - Richard Juan, "Ang Online Oppa ni Kuya"
- Pinoy Big Brother: Kumunity Season 10
  - Sky Quizon, "Ang Online Hottie ni Kuya"
  - Richard Juan, "Ang Online Oppa ni Kuya"
- Pinoy Big Brother: Gen 11
  - Alexa Ilacad, "Ang Gen-Z Bestie ni Kuya"
- Pinoy Big Brother: Celebrity Collab Edition
  - Gabbi Garcia, "Ang Kapuso It Girl ni Kuya"
  - Mavy Legaspi, "Ang Kapuso Royal Tropa ni Kuya"
- Pinoy Big Brother: Collab 3.0
  - Michael Sager, "Ang Kapuso Wonder Host ni Kuya"

=== Game shows ===
Due to the show's popularity, a game show segment was launched by the network and was called Pinoy Big Brother: Yes or No. It was one which uses the board game format and uses questions related to the show as well as ABS-CBN's other primetime soap operas. The show was hosted by Mariel Rodriguez and it promised to give a daily studio contestant up to twenty-five thousand pesos. After a week as a segment of the show, it became a separate early afternoon game show on October 24, 2005. This show was terminated after the first season ended.

Another popular game show segment was launched during the first season of Pinoy Big Brother and was called What's the Word? That's the Word!. It was a raffle show hosted by Mariel Rodriguez and aired during commercial breaks at primetime telecast. At first, it started as a trivia game show for Pinoy Big Brother, and then later, it was extended as a trivia game show for the whole Primetime block. The show continued even after Pinoy Big Brother's first-year run ended. It later returned as the promotion What's the Word? Guess the Word! This time, however, the promotion is by Smart Communications and it is separate from Pinoy Big Brother.

=== Talk show ===
The popularity of the show and its former housemates spawned another show called Pinoy Big Brother Buzz, hosted by actress Anne Curtis, gossip reporter AJ Dee, and comedian Pokwang. Like its parent show The Buzz, the show tackles events and goings-on inside the house, the controversy surrounding the show, and the latest gossip about the housemates who were already evicted. The show was cancelled during the run of the Celebrity Edition to make way for the romantic anthology Your Song.

=== Online shows ===
In the first special season, a late-night online show called Pinoy Big Brother Uplate Online was introduced. It was hosted by Slater Young, and Joj and Jai Agpangan. In the second special season, Pinoy Big Brother: 737 Online was introduced. It was hosted by Robi Domingo and Bianca Gonzalez and unlike the previous season, it occurred every 7:37 pm.

=== Spin-off shows ===
After the first regular season, a spin-off drama adventure series featuring the former housemates was aired for two weeks after Christmas and was called The Final Task. Another spin-off was the romantic reality show, called Melason in Love, was aired after the end of Pinoy Big Brother: Double Up. It was the first reality spin-off show of the franchise. The show focused to Melai Cantiveros and Jason Francisco's love story which initially developed during the middle of the season. It features behind the scenes footage after the PBB Big Night, few of guesting programs in all ABS-CBN shows, and the struggles of the couple after the end of the season.

A spin-off program called PBB: Gen 11 Big 4Ever premiered on December 9, 2024, and ended on January 24, 2025, as the Gen 11 housemates come back to Big Brother's house and revisit some of their iconic moments during their stay.

=== Reunion specials ===
On June 4, 2006, a night after the finale of the Teen Edition, a live musical special called Pinoy Big Brother: the Big Reunion was held at the Aliw Theater in the CCP Grounds, Manila, with all the housemates for the first season, the Celebrity Edition, and the Teen Edition gathered in one spot. The show showcased and celebrated the success of the show, especially its greatest moments and accomplishments. This was done to cap off the show's first year on the air.

Two succeeding Big Reunions were held. The first was on June 9, 2008, wherein the housemates of the second Teen Edition, special housemates, and their Guardians took part. The second was on February 14, 2010, this time involving the Double Up housemates. Unlike the first Big Reunion, the gatherings only involved the housemates of each of the two seasons mentioned.

On June 27, 2010, another reunion special called High Five: The Big Five Years of Pinoy Big Brother gathered the Pinoy Big Brother: Teen Clash 2010 Big Six together with several notable housemates from editions past, many from the final group of their season, celebrate the memorable moments from the less than five years of the franchise.

On October 27, 2024, a night after the finale of the Gen 11 season, another reunion special called Aba, Ayos! Ang Pagtatapos: The Reunion Special (lit. 'Well, Nice! The Ending: The Reunion Special') featured the reunion of the former housemates (with the exception of Noimie, who was abroad at the time of the season's finale) and the finalists, and features a look back to the highlighted moments of their season through the traditional üBERActing segment played by the hosts as housemates.

== Reception ==
=== ABS-CBN Studio Experience ===
In September 2018, ABS-CBN launched "ABS-CBN Studio Experience," an indoor theme park located in Trinoma, Quezon City. The said indoor theme park includes attractions that immerses its visitors to become a contestant, an actor, an audience or a production unit member of the network's different shows. One of the shows featured as an attraction in the theme park is Pinoy Big Brother where a visitor can experience to become a housemate and participate in various tasks to be given by Big Brother. The indoor theme park was closed in August 2020 due to ABS-CBN focusing more on their digital and cable businesses after its franchise was denied.

=== Controversies ===
Like other franchises around the world, the concept and implementation of Pinoy Big Brother has been the subject of numerous controversies as well as criticism from the Filipino public and news outlets. Both the Movie and Television Review and Classification Board (MTRCB) and franchise holder Endemol have investigated incidents that occurred since the show's launch in 2005. The MTRCB, then headed by Consoliza Laguardia, questioned the show's content–in particular the risqué outfits worn by some of the housemates in the show's first season–and met with ABS-CBN executives where they discussed how “to make [the show] more wholesome” and thus palatable to conservative Filipino sensibilities; Series director Laurenti Dyogi was aware of the controversies generated by the British version of the franchise, and sought to tone down Pinoy Big Brother for Filipino audiences. The show also faced criticism over allegations of rigging and premediated scripting owing to how many of the series' winners went on to have notable careers in show business, to which Diogi vehemently denied.

The series theme song "Pinoy Ako" was also the subject of a plagiarism controversy, where it is alleged that the song's melody and musical arrangement was illicitly derived from the song "Chandeliers" by the 1980s English new wave band Care. In a 2021 interview, Clem Castro admitted that he did "subconsciously" apply the chord patterns to "Pinoy Ako" as they also covered songs from The Cure at the time, though he also maintained that the progression used for the song is widely used across genres such as blues and reggae.

=== Awards and recognitions ===
Year	Awards	Nominated	Result	Ref.
2025	38th PMPC Star Awards for Television by Philippine Movie Press Club	Bianca Gonzalez, Robi Domingo, Kim Chiu, Melai Cantiveros, Enchong Dee, and Alexa Ilacad (Pinoy Big Brother: Gen 11) for Best Reality Show Host	Won	
2015	29th PMPC Star Awards for Television by Philippine Movie Press Club	Toni Gonzaga, Bianca Gonzalez, Robi Domingo and Enchong Dee (Pinoy Big Brother: 737) for Best Reality Show Host	Won	
2015	29th PMPC Star Awards for Television by Philippine Movie Press Club	Toni Gonzaga, Robi Domingo, Bianca Gonzales and John Prats (Pinoy Big Brother: All In) for Best Reality Show Host	Nominated	
2014	28th PMPC Star Awards for Television by Philippine Movie Press Club	Toni Gonzaga, Bianca Gonzalez, Robi Domingo and John Prats for Best Reality Show Host/s	Won	
2014	2014 Boomerang Awards by Internet Mobile and Marketing Association of the Philippines	Pinoy Big Brother: All In Online Bahay ni Kuya (Online Facebook application) for Effectivity category	Silver	
2014	2014 Boomerang Awards by Internet Mobile and Marketing Association of the Philippines	Pinoy Big Brother: All In Online Bahay ni Kuya (Online Facebook application) for Campaigns category	Bronze	
2012	27th PMPC Star Awards for Television by Philippine Movie Press Club	Toni Gonzaga as Best Reality/Game Show Host	Nominated	
2012	27th PMPC Star Awards for Television by Philippine Movie Press Club	Bianca Gonzalez as Best Reality/Game Show Host	Nominated	
2012	27th PMPC Star Awards for Television by Philippine Movie Press Club	Robi Domingo as Best Reality/Game Show Host	Nominated	
2010	24th PMPC Star Awards for Television by Philippine Movie Press Club	Toni Gonzaga for Best Reality Program Host	Won	
2010	24th PMPC Star Awards for Television by Philippine Movie Press Club	Mariel Rodriguez for Best Reality Program Host	Nominated	
2010	24th PMPC Star Awards for Television by Philippine Movie Press Club	Bianca Gonzalez for Best Reality Program Host	Nominated	
2008	4th USTv Students' Choice Awards by University of Santo Tomas	Pinoy Big Brother: Season 2 for Student's Choice of Reality Show	Won	

== Notable people ==
Several famous people auditioned for Pinoy Big Brother before they became well-known but did not make it to the final line-up including Vice Ganda, Nadine Lustre, Alden Richards, Maine Mendoza, Gabbi Garcia, Jerome Ponce, Ivana Alawi, Kris Bernal, RK Bagatsing, and Jackie Gonzaga.
