= Pinoy Big Brother: 737 – Part 2 =

Reality television competition season

The second part of Pinoy Big Brother: 737 began airing on August 8, 2015, as part of the tenth year season of Big Brother in the Philippines. This is unofficially called a regular edition since this batch of housemates are ages 18 and above. It is hosted by Toni Gonzaga, Bianca Gonzalez, Robi Domingo and Enchong Dee. The show airs on ABS-CBN at 10:00 p.m. (PST) every Mondays to Sundays.

The next set of housemates – the regular housemates – entered on Day 50, the day the four teen finalists left the House. 16 housemates entered this batch, with one cross-over housemate from the previous batch. There was an eviction every week, where one housemate is evicted, with the exceptions of a triple eviction on Day 79, and a week-long challenge that gave a housemate a sure slot in the final four. Two housemates returned to determine who will return to the House as a housemate. Two housemates opted for a voluntary exit. On Day 133, voting opened to determine the winner for this batch. On Day 141, Roger Lucero and Dawn Chang were named third and fourth placers, respectively. On the same day, voting for the remaining two housemates re-opened to determine the winner for this batch.

Miho Nishida emerged as the winner for this batch.

== Housemates ==
On July 27, 2015, it was announced that a second batch of housemates – regular housemates – will be introduced from August 3 to 7. The housemates will be introduced at different ABS-CBN programs, It's Showtime, TV Patrol, then had their first exclusive interview on Aquino & Abunda Tonight before they formally enter the House. The first six entered on Day 50 while the last six entered the following day. Due to Jyo's voluntary exit, a replacement housemate entered on Day 77. Two housemates entered on Days 80 and 81.

16 housemates entered for this batch. The ages indicated are the housemates' ages when they first entered the House. Origin indicates where the housemates were born or based before joining the program. An italicized name indicates a cross-over housemate from the first part of the season.

Name	Age on entry	Hometown	Entered	Exited	Result
Miho Nishida	22	Japan	Day 51	Day 142	Winner
Tommy Esguerra	21	Las Piñas	Day 77	Day 142	Runner-up
Roger Lucero	28	Bacolod	Day 50	Day 141	3rd Place
Dawn Chang	26	Parañaque	Day 50	Day 141	4th Place
Zeus Collins	21	Rizal	Day 80	Day 133	Evicted
Richard Juan	23	Parañaque	Day 51	Day 119	Evicted
Jameson Blake	18	Angeles, Pampanga	Day 81	Day 112	Evicted
Mikee Agustin	21	Bulacan	Day 50; Day 84	Day 79; Day 105	Evicted
Margo Midwinter	23	Manila	Day 50	Day 98	Evicted
Kamille Filoteo	18	Manila	Day 1 Day 84	Day 47; Day 86	Evicted
Charlhone Petro	22	Angeles, Pampanga	Day 50	Day 79	Evicted
Krizia Lusuegro	24	Iloilo	Day 51	Day 79	Evicted
Philip Lampart	21	Australia	Day 51	Day 77	Evicted
Jyo Yokoyama	21	Japan	Day 50	Day 76	Voluntary exit
James Linao	30	Surigao del Sur	Day 51	Day 70	Evicted
Jessica Marasigan	21	California, United States	Day 51	Day 58	Voluntary exit

=== Houseguests ===
Enchong Dee, the first of 3 celebrity houseguests, was carried on from the teen batch onto this batch. He exited on Day 52. Karla Estrada, the second celebrity houseguest, entered on Day 107 and exited on Day 111. The third and final celebrity houseguest is former host, Mariel Rodriguez-Padilla. The four teen finalists, Bailey, Franco, Jimboy, and Ylona, returned on Day 99, but will not compete with the regular housemates at this point. However, they were involved in the nomination process on Day 113. Other houseguests were Enrique Gil, Vice Ganda, Gerald Anderson, Jayson Gainza, Melai Cantiveros, Jason Francisco, Director Jerome Chavez Pobocan, Daniel Matsunaga, Erich Gonzales, Jhong Hilario, Karylle, Anne Curtis, Vhong Navarro, Billy Crawford, Kim Atienza, Coleen Garcia, Ryan Bang, Eric Tai, Teddy Corpuz and Jugs Jugueta.

== Chronology of events ==
As this is still part of one season, 737, week counting and day numbering will continue from the last day of the first batch of housemates. Note that August 8, 2015 is Day 50.

=== Week 8 ===
Six housemates entered the House on Day 50. Prior to their entry, two housemates, in separate instances, were first chosen by the teen finalists of 737. The housemates they had chosen picked another housemate, while the one picked does the same. The first group who entered the House were Jyo, Roger and Dawn; they were followed by Charlhone, Mikee and Margo. The said housemates entered an almost empty House of which they had carried over from the teen housemates wherein, upon the latter group's last week, the furniture and other things were taken away by ninjas. Instructed by Enchong Dee, their first task was to keep the activity door open and get the lost 65 furniture and place it back inside the House perfectly as based from the House's floor plan. They were only given one hour to finish the task. They were successful in getting all 65 furnitures; however, they failed to place 3 of them in their right positions. On Day 51, the last six housemates, Richard, Krizia, Jessica, James, Miho, and Philip, entered the House. The first five were tasked to play as babies and that the first batch of housemates had to feed and put them to sleep before they can act back normally as adults. Philip, the last to enter, was permitted to bring his son inside the House; his wife was also allowed to enter the House as a special privilege to take care of their baby. In a surprising twist, on Day 52, the housemates were told that the nominations would take place later that day and that they were only allowed to nominate one person; from all 12 of them, Miho was nominated with three points. In the evening, Enchong exited the House secretly.

=== Week 9 ===
Day 57 saw the official announcement of the first set of nominees, Jessica, Margo, and Miho. Margo saved herself from eviction by winning the Ligtask challenge. On Day 58, after hearing the news of the death of her grandmother, Jessica opted for a voluntary exit. On Day 59, they were given their second weekly task that has something to do with the tenth year celebration of Pinoy Big Brother. Charlhone was also given a punishment for lapel violations and whispering. On Day 63, the housemates and the winners of previous seasons, together with Big Brother, celebrated the show's tenth year with a ball. The second 7 was also revealed to mean that the current housemates and the winners of the franchise will unite to raise P3,000,000 in seven weeks, to be used to build a community of 20 houses for 20 families.

=== Week 10 ===
On Day 64, James, Krizia, and Margo became the second set of nominees. Krizia was saved from the Ligtask challenge. On Day 66, Mikee was given a task to host an online show for 7 hours and 37 minutes. Every view will have a money equivalent that will be added to the P3,000,000 target fund for their seven-week charity work.

=== Week 11 ===
On Day 71, Charlhone, Dawn, Jyo, Margo, and Philip became nominated this week. Charlhone was removed from the list after winning the Ligtask challenge. Their fourth weekly task was given on Day 72 that will help them raise money to reach the P3,000,000 target charity fund. 737 teen housemates and previous winners, season 1's Nene Tamayo and first celebrity edition's Keanna Reeves, became servers for the restaurant on Days 74 and 75. On Day 76, through flipping a coin, Jyo opted for a voluntary exit. He informed the boys of his leaving. The boys must help him pack and leave without the girls noticing. He left the House the next day. Voting for the remaining nominees, Dawn, Margo, and Phil, continued. On Day 77, Philip was evicted garnering the least percentage of votes. Tommy entered the House after Philip's exit, replacing Jyo. Miho was given a special task from Big Brother regarding Tommy's entry. For Tommy to be able to enter inside the House, Miho had to answer several questions regarding other housemates' personal lives and open the locks from Tommy.

=== Week 12 ===
On Day 78, the nomination happened during the morning due to the new twist, Big Yanig. Housemates won the weekly task with the net total amount of P93,385.25, which was earned from the two-day Food Fest. Dawn, Margo, Miho and Richard earned P47,491 while Charlhone, Krizia, Mikee and Roger earned P45,894.25, which gave Dawn, Margo, Miho and Richard immunity from nomination and Charlhone, Krizia, Mikee and Roger an automatic nomination. Because of the new twist, Charlhone, Krizia, Mikee and Roger will face the Ligtask challenge as a group. If Charlhone, Krizia, Mikee and Roger fail the task, only one of them will be saved from eviction at the end of the week; however, if they win, only one of them will be evicted. They were originally given 73 minutes and 7 seconds to win the challenge, but Big Brother gave the safe housemates a task to lengthen the given time by forming a circle and each fusing half of a cylinder, containing two balls, on both hands. The timer stops at the last pair breaking the fusion. 56 minutes and 29 seconds were added, with a total of 129 minutes and 34 seconds to win the task. They failed at accomplishing the task. On the same day, the safe housemates were asked to pick one housemate who they want to save. On Day 79, the eviction process began and the safe housemates were tasked to put on the Ligtas medallion on their chosen housemate. Roger got the most votes with two medallions, leaving Charlhone, Krizia, and Mikee, with one medallion, to be evicted from the House. On Day 80, Zeus entered the House as a dancing statue. On Day 81, Jameson entered the House. On Day 84, ex-housemates Mikee, a wild-card housemate, and Kamille, a cross-over housemate, were asked by Big Brother to re-enter the house but only one of them will get a chance to compete as a regular housemate, with their fate to be decided through public voting.

=== Week 13 ===
On Day 86, after an overnight voting, Mikee returned to the house. On Day 87, Big Brother gave them a weekly task to make the housemates feel the problems of traffic in the metro these days. On Day 91, as part of their seven-week charity effort, the housemates held a dance concert. The total amount of money that the housemates earned for this week was P175,000.

=== Week 14 ===
On Day 93, housemates underwent an endurance test to determine the nominees for this week. Jameson, Mikee, Richard, and Roger were the last four standing, and therefore safe from eviction. They chose one housemate from the remaining nominees to save from eviction; they chose Dawn. On Day 94, the boys and girls were separated for their weekly task. The boys were sent to another part of the House, while the girls remained. On Day 95, during a live show, Jameson met with his father for a 100-second encounter. On Day 98 , Margo was evicted after garnering the lowest vote against Miho, Zeus, and Tommy

=== Week 15 ===
On Day 99, during the first sixth anniversary kickoff of ABS-CBN's variety show It's Showtime at the Smart Araneta Coliseum, Big Brother announced the re-entry of the four teen finalists, Bailey, Franco, Jimboy, and Ylona as houseguests. They will stay in the House until the final night. On Day 105, Mikee was re-evicted with 18.20% of the total votes, the rest of nominees saved from eviction receiving highest number of votes – 63.15% and 18.65%, respectively.

=== Week 16 ===
On Day 107, Karla, the second of three celebrity houseguests, entered the House. On Day 112, Jameson was evicted after garnering the fewest votes against Richard and Zeus receiving 30.9% of the total votes.

=== Week 17 ===
On Day 113, Karla and the Teen Big 4 were instructed by big Brother to create a set of nominees by nominating three housemates with one point each. S-E Voting System returned. On Day 115, Miho was given a task where she will have baking and modelling classes with the children where she will be the teacher. If she succeeded these tasks, she would be able to see her daughter, Aimi. On Day 117, Miho's daughter, Aimi, visited the house as house guest. Richard was given a special task on reporting regarding the issues about the remaining housemates. On Day 119, Richard became the latest evictee garnering -21.25%, which was his net vote during the S-E Voting Result.

=== Week 18 ===
On Day 122, Aimi left the house. It was announced that there would be a Big Jump to the Big 4, where one regular housemate will ensure his/her spot once he/she wins. Before the series of challenges, the five remaining regular housemates had undergone the nomination, which was choosing who were their personal Big 4. Tommy got the lowest votes, which means he could not join on any challenge in this twist. Dawn, and Tommy later had a heated confrontation. Later on, Dawn, Miho, Roger and Zeus participated the series of Big Jump to the Big 4 challenges. Their first challenge was where they should keep their respective boats sinking. The Teen Big 4 chose their partners respectively. Jimboy chose Roger, Franco chose Miho, Bailey chose Zeus and Ylona chose Richard. Miho was supposed to be eliminated in the 1st challenge, however Zeus violated the rules of the challenge, which made him eliminated in the first round. On the 2nd challenge, Dawn, Miho, and Roger had to participate the maze challenge. Dawn's mother, Miho's mother, Mercedes, and Roger's wife, Jona, served as guides for them to finish the challenge respectively. Roger lost the challenge. Dawn and Miho, were the two remaining housemates who will face the final challenge, where one of them will guarantee a sure spot in the Big 4 for the Regular Housemates. At the end, Dawn, was the first housemate who is now part of the Regular Big 4. There was no eviction held during the week.

=== Week 19 ===
On Day 133, Zeus was evicted garnering least percentage of votes. Dawn, Miho, Tommy, and Roger was officially the Regular Big Four. It was also announced that there will be two (2) Big Winners (One from the teens and one from the regulars). In addition to that, it was also announce that the third celebrity houseguest is Mariel Rodriguez-Padilla.

== Tasks and challenges ==
=== Weekly tasks ===
Task No.	Date given	Task title and description	Result
1	August 10 (Day 52)	The Big Crib; Housemates must rock a big baby crib and should not stop rocking it until the end of the week. There should also be one housemate lying inside the crib.	Passed
2	August 17 (Day 59)	Hovertrax Number; Housemates must choreograph a dance number to the song Pinoy Ako while riding on a hovertrax. They must form ten images from the choreography when a photo is taken above the dance area. In addition to that, they must build two domino towers on the area and this should not be destroyed during the performance.	Passed
3	August 24 (Day 66)	All Around the World; Housemates have to control a helicopter while going to different countries on a laid-out map using the remote control. Some are blindfolded doing the task, others are not. The helicopter must not touch the ground five times.	Failed
4	August 30 (Day 72)	Food Fest (Food Fight); Housemates are divided into two groups, with Krizia and Richard as the leaders of their respective groups, the known name of these two groups were christened as their respective names P na P: Pinoy na Pinoy (Promise na Promise) Restaurant and Team Beach Club. The two groups must earn in a net total of P50,000 to win the weekly task. In addition, the team with the most profit earned will be saved from the next nomination, and the losing team will be automatically nominated. Below the list the summary of these two groups (including "servers"). ~~Name~~ indicates that the housemate left the house before the results were announced.: Group Leader (with member/s) / Servers / / Result; Group Leader (with member/s) / First Day (Teen Big 4 - Day 74) / Second Day (Ex-737 teen housemates - Day 75) / Result; Krizia; Charlhone, ~~Jyo~~, Mikee, Roger / Franco, Ylona / Kamille, Kyle, Ryan / Lost; Richard; Dawn, Margo, Miho, ~~Philip~~ / Bailey, Jimboy / Barbie, Kenzo^{1}, Zonia / Won	Passed
5	September 7 (Day 80)	Hata-Wow; Housemates must dance at all times while they are awake. There are three different song cues that Big Brother will give to them when it's time to dance despite whatever they're doing, go to the stage set on the garden and dance there, or stop moving. They can only make five mistakes for the whole week.	Failed
6	September 14 (Day 87)	The Big Christmas Rush; Housemates must do a given challenge while Big Brother's accomplices deliver the housemates' gifts to their loved ones. They must do these tasks continuously until their gifts have reached their intended destination. To pass, they must successfully deliver seven out of nine gifts.: Gift Givers / Challenge / Result; Jameson, Zeus / Jameson and Zeus play basketball. The girls became cheerleaders during timeout. / Passed; Miho, Tommy / Miho and Tommy personally delivered their gifts. / Passed; Dawn, Richard / Two housemates at a time do pole dancing. A roulette determines which body part must touch the pole at all times, until they switch housemates. / Passed; Margo, Mikee, Roger / Two housemates pull a sleigh while one housemate sits inside the sleigh. / Passed	Passed
7	September 21 (Day 94)	Lipat-Bahay; The boys were separated from the girls and was sent to a secluded area in the House. There are two parts to this weekly task. Their weekly budget depends on the success or failure of one or both groups. Part 1: The boys must wash 50 sacks of clothes. They also have to press it. Part 2: The girls must teach Miho and two other Japanese boys English.	Passed
8	September 28 (Day 101)	Sayaw Galaw Hataw Dance School; Big Brother gave the housemates the freedom to come up with a weekly task that would help them accumulate P500,000, as part of the seven-week charity fund. They chose to hold dance classes, and present a benefit show at the end of the week. In addition, the House was opened for public touring, which also aid on adding to the target fund for this week.	Passed
9	Date unknown	Dawn and Tommy's Secret Tasks; Big Brother ordered Dawn and Tommy to cook soup for Miho and to bake Bailey's favorite cake without their knowledge. The rest of the housemates and houseguests had to guess whom the foods made by Dawn and Tommy were for, who were Miho and Bailey. If they were able to guess, Miho and Bailey would be able to watch their mothers in the confession room.	Passed
10	October 12 (Day 115)	Perya Pares; Housemates should perform at least three out of five circus acts. If they fail to perform at least three, they will fail this weekly task.	Failed
11	October 17 (Day 120)	Stop Motion Music Videos; Regular housemates were tasked to create a music video, which song should be "Win The Fight" sung by Ylona while teen housemates were tasked to create a music video, which should be "Now We're Together" originally sung by Khalil Ramos. Both videos should reach 737,000 YouTube views individually in order for them to succeed this weekly task.	Failed
12	October 24 (Day 127)	Short Film Festival; Housemates were given a weekly task where they will make a short film. They had to undergo acting workshops under Director Jerome Chavez Pobocan, who will direct the short film they are going to make. The public will judge the acting performances of the housemates.	Passed

Note/s

1. On the second day of food fight (Day 75), Kenzo was supposedly participated as "server" for Richard's food fight group, but the whole day (morning to afternoon) he did not yet entered (back) at the house's activity area, where the venue of the above-mentioned food fight task. So, he officially entered (back) lately in the evening.

=== Ligtask ===
Nominated housemates had to compete in challenges in order to save themselves from eviction. In case of ties, no one will be saved.

Date given	Ligtask recipient(s)	Ligtask description	Result
August 15 (Day 57)	Jessica, Margo, Miho	The nominated housemates must balance and across a ball from one end of the beam and shoot it on the other end. They have three chances to do the task. The nominee with the most balls shot in the shortest time wins.	Margo; 3 balls
August 22 (Day 64)	James, Krizia, Margo	The nominees must throw three balloons and must keep them in the air for as long as possible. Once one balloon touches the ground, their time stops. The nominee who made the balloons stay in the air the longest wins.	Krizia; 24.79 seconds
August 29 (Day 71)	Charlhone, Dawn, Jyo, Margo, Philip	The nominees will release balls from a container onto a pool with frogs. They must return the balls to the container. The nominee who completes the task the fastest wins.	Charlhone; 16.66 seconds
September 5 (Day 78)	Charlhone, Krizia, Mikee, Roger	This challenge is done as a group. Housemates must go through an obstacle course, composed of strings with a bell hanging in each string. Each housemate is placed on one part of the course. The first housemate must go through the course and fetch the next housemate. They must do this until all of them get out of the maze. They must not let a bell ring, or else, they repeat the course. This challenge will determine the number of housemates leaving on the next eviction round.	none
September 26 (Day 99)	Jameson, Mikee, Richard, Tommy	Each housemate should shoot five balls into a prism. The housemate with the most balls or the fastest time if in case there are ties wins.	Richard; 1 ball - 9.5 seconds

=== 7:37 ===
The housemates had to finish a task within 7 minutes and 37 seconds or 7 hours and 37 minutes.

Date given	Task recipient(s)	Task title and description	Rewards	Result
August 27 (Day 69)	Mikee	Mikee was tasked to do an online show, The Mikeeliling Show, for 7 hours and 37 minutes.	Mikee's birthday celebration	Passed

=== YouTube Home-made Videos ===
Regular housemates and the four teen finalists were instructed to make a YouTube video by teams. The teen finalists chose two members for their team. The team with the highest view count will be saved from nomination. Note that the four finalists are not competing housemates at this point, so they are exempted from nominations. ~~Name~~ indicates the housemate got evicted before the results were announced.

Groups	Views Percentage	Result
Bailey, Miho and Tommy	45.18%	Winner
Jimboy, ~~Mikee~~ and Richard	30.86%	Runner-Up
Ylona, Dawn and Jameson	14.43%	3rd Place
Franco, Roger and Zeus	9.51%	4th Place
TOTAL VIEWS	99.98%	

== Nomination history ==
In every nomination, each housemate has to nominate two people with the first receiving two points and the second with one point. On Day 78, housemates were asked to vote who they want to stay in the House, as part of the Big Yanig twist. Two ex-housemates were put on public vote on Day 84 to determine who will return to the House. During fifth nominations, Ligtask challenges were not implemented, however it resumed during the sixth nominations. Starting the seventh nominations, Ligtask challenges were no longer implemented.

Pinoy Big Brother: 737 - Part 2 nomination history
	none		#1	#2	Big Yanig		Dance Till You Drop	#6	#7	Houseguests' Voting	Big Jump To The Big 4				Big Night		Nominations received
	none		#1	#2	#3	Special #4	#5	#6	#7	#8	#9				Big Night		Nominations received
Eviction Day and Date	—		Day 70 August 28	Day 77 September 4	Day 79 September 6	Day 86 September 13	Day 98 September 25	Day 105 October 2	Day 112 October 9	Day 119 October 16	Day 133 October 30				Day 141 November 7	Day 142 November 8	Nominations received
Nomination Day and Date	Day 52; August 10	Day 57; August 15	Day 64; August 22	Day 71; August 29	Day 78; September 5	Day 84; September 11	Day 93; September 20	Day 99; September 26	Day 106; October 3	Day 113; October 10	Day 122; October 19	Day 123; October 20	Day 124; October 21	Day 125; October 22	Day 133; October 30	Day 141; November 7	Nominations received
Housemates
Miho	Margo	James; Jyo	Margo; Richard	Jyo; Philip	Mikee	No nominations	Not eligible	Richard; Roger	Richard; Zeus	Not eligible	Dawn; Roger; Tommy	No nominations	No nominations	No nominations	Advanced	Winner	8 (+2; -4)
Tommy	Not in House				Roger	No nominations	Not eligible	Jameson; Mikee	Jameson; Dawn	Not eligible	Miho; Roger; Zeus	Exempt			Advanced	Runner-up	9 (+1; -3)
Roger	James	Dawn; Jessica	Margo; Krizia	Charlhone; Margo	Not eligible	No nominations	Tommy	Tommy; Zeus	Jameson; Zeus	Not eligible	Dawn; Miho; Zeus	No nominations	No nominations	Exempt	3rd Place	Exited (Day 141)	7 (+2; -6)
Dawn	Roger	Jessica; Charlhone	Margo; Jyo	Margo; Philip	Krizia	No nominations	Not eligible	Mikee; Tommy	Jameson; Zeus	Not eligible	Miho; Roger; Zeus	No nominations	No nominations	Finalist	4th Place	Exited (Day 141)	17 (-5)
Zeus	Not in House					No nominations	Not eligible	Richard; Mikee	Jameson; Richard	Not eligible	Dawn; Roger; Tommy	No nominations	Exempt		Evicted (Day 133)		7 (+2; -3)
Richard	Miho	Jessica; Charlhone	James; Charlhone	Jyo; Charlhone	Roger	No nominations	Margo	Jameson; Tommy	Jameson; Zeus	Not eligible	Evicted (Day 119)						19
Jameson	Not in House					No nominations	Dawn	Tommy; Richard	Richard; Roger	Evicted (Day 112)							15
Mikee	Philip	Krizia; Jessica	Krizia; James	Philip; Charlhone	Not eligible	Re-entered (Day 84)	Dawn	Dawn; Jameson	Re-evicted (Day 105)								6 (+1; -1)
Margo	Miho	Jessica; Dawn	James; Krizia	Jyo; Miho	Charlhone	No nominations	Not eligible	Evicted (Day 98)									20 (+1; -1)
Kamille	Evicted from Teen Batch (Day 47)					Re-entered (Day 84)	Re-evicted (Day 86)										N/A
Charlhone	Jessica	Dawn; Mikee	James; Dawn	Dawn; Roger	Not eligible	Evicted (Day 79)											15 (+1; -1)
Krizia	Dawn	Margo; James	James; Charlhone	Charlhone; Dawn	Not eligible	Evicted (Day 79)											6 (+1; -1)
Philip	Mikee	Margo; Charlhone	James; Margo	Dawn; Margo	Evicted (Day 77)												6
Jyo	Philip	Charlhone; Margo	James; Charlhone	Roger; Margo	Voluntary Exit (Day 76)												10
James	Miho	Richard; Margo	Richard; Margo	Evicted (Day 70)													17
Jessica	Charlhone	Jyo; Richard	Voluntary Exit (Day 58)														9
Houseguests
Jimboy	Not in House							Houseguest (Day 99–132)		Miho; Richard; Tommy	Houseguest (Day 99–132)				Advanced	Winner	N/A
Ylona	Not in House							Houseguest (Day 99–132)		Dawn; Miho; Zeus	Houseguest (Day 99–132)				Advanced	Runner-up	N/A
Franco	Not in House							Houseguest (Day 99–132)		Roger; Tommy; Zeus	Houseguest (Day 99–132)				3rd Place	Exited (Day 141)	N/A
Bailey	Not in House							Houseguest (Day 99–132)		Dawn; Miho; Richard	Houseguest (Day 99–132)				4th Place	Exited (Day 141)	N/A
Mariel	Not in House													Houseguest (Day 133)	Exited (Day 133)		N/A
Karla	Not in House									Miho; Richard; Tommy	Exited (Day 111)						N/A
Notes	^{1}	^{2}	^{none}	^{3}	^{4}	^{5}	^{6}	^{none}	^{7}	^{8}	^{9}	^{10}	^{11}	^{12}	^{13}		
Up for eviction	Miho	Jessica; Margo	James; Krizia; Margo	Charlhone; Dawn; Jyo; Margo; Philip	Charlhone; Krizia; Mikee; Roger	Kamille; Mikee	Margo; Miho; Tommy; Zeus	Jameson; Mikee; Richard; Tommy	Jameson; Richard; Zeus	Miho; Richard; Tommy	Tommy	Zeus	Roger	Miho	Open; Voting		
Ligtask Winner	Margo		Krizia	Charlhone	none			Richard	not implemented								
Saved from Eviction	Miho		Margo; 69.69%	Margo; 48.01; Dawn; 27.03%	Roger; 2 of 5 votes to save	Mikee; 83.32%	Miho; 49.37% Tommy; 26.82% Zeus; 12.54%	Tommy; 63.15% Jameson; 18.65%	Richard; 35.87% Zeus; 33.22%	Miho; 27.18% Tommy; 13.13%	Miho; 47.36% Tommy; 41.92% Roger; 6.84%				Miho; 61.51% Tommy; 20.71%	Miho; 81.96%	
Evicted	No Eviction		James; 30.31%	Philip; 24.96%	Charlhone; Krizia; Mikee; 1 of 5 votes to save	Kamille; 16.68%	Margo; 11.27%	Mikee; 18.20%	Jameson; 30.9%	Richard -21.25%	Zeus; 3.88%				Roger; 9.99% Dawn; 7.79%	Tommy; 18.04%	
Voluntary Exit	Jessica		none	Jyo	none										Roger; 9.99% Dawn; 7.79%	Tommy; 18.04%	
References																	

Legend

Granted immunity after winning a challenge or fulfilling a task.
Received automatic nomination after failing a challenge/task or committed violations.
Exempted from being given nomination points, but is nominated.
Nominated but saved by housemates' votes or unforeseen circumstances.

Notes

1. They only nominated one housemate for this round. Miho was given a task to remove herself from the list of nominees. She failed the task.
2. Enchong was given a task to hide a golden medallion inside the House. Whoever gets the medallion will be saved from nomination. Philip got the medallion.
3. Despite Jyo's voluntary exit, voting for the rest of nominated housemates, Dawn, Margo and Philip, continued.
4. The winning team in the Food Fight will be saved from nomination. The members of the losing team participated in the Ligtask challenge as a group. If they win the task, only one will be evicted, otherwise, three will be evicted. The votes shown in the table, were nominations 'to save' and not 'to evict'. The nominations were done after the Ligtask challenge, of which the group had failed to win. Do note that Tommy had immunity from being evicted due to his entry that particular week; he was allowed to make a vote to save.
5. Kamille and Mikee returned to the House as Yanig Challengers; they were up for eviction to determine who gets to return as an official housemate.
6. The nominees for this week is determined by an endurance test. The last four housemates who remained dancing are safe from eviction. The safe housemates, then, chose another housemate to be saved. They chose Dawn.
7. Miho and Tommy had the highest views in their Home-made videos which granted them immunity from nomination.
8. Houseguests nominated the housemates for this round. At this point, save-evict voting system was implemented.
9. Each housemate was instructed by Big Brother to nominate three housemates whom he/she wants to be part of his/her Big Four. The housemate with the lowest votes only will not join the series of challenges of the Big Jump to the Big 4.
10. Dawn, Miho, Roger and Zeus participated the first challenge, where they should keep their respective boats floating. The housemate with the shortest time will no longer participate in the next round. Miho who was eliminated in that round, however Zeus violated one of the rules in that round, which prevented him from joining the next round.
11. Dawn, Miho and Roger participated the second challenge, which was maze challenge. Their respective loved ones served as guides. Roger lost the challenge.
12. Dawn and Miho faced the final challenge. Dawn, who held the flag with the longer time, won the challenge, thus guaranteed her a spot in the Big 4.
13. After announcing the third and fourth placers, voting was re-opened for the final two housemates.

=== Save-Evict voting result ===
Below is the breakdown of votes. This was only implemented during the 8th Eviction Night.

Eviction no.	Housemates	Votes			Result
Eviction no.	Housemates	To-Save	To-Evict	Net	Result
8	Miho	29.09%	-1.91%	27.18%	Saved
8	Richard	11.84%	-33.09%	-21.25%	Evicted
8	Tommy	18.6%	-5.47%	13.13%	Saved

=== Big Jump to The Big Four ===
On Day 122, Big Brother gave a challenge that will determine who will be given the first slot in the Big 4. The challenge is composed of four stages. Each stage, one will be eliminated until the last one stands who will have a secured spot.

On Stage 1, housemates voted who should be part of the final four. The housemate with the lowest points will be eliminated. Tommy was eliminated, with only two points. See nomination history for voting history.

On Stage 2, the remaining four housemates were seated inside a sinking ship and, with the help of the four teen finalists, they have to remove the water from the inside to avoid sinking. The housemate who sinks first will be eliminated. Dawn, Miho, Roger, and Zeus became partners with Ylona, Franco, Jimboy, and Bailey, respectively. Miho's boat was the first to sink, but after careful examination by Big Brother, Zeus and Bailey were found to be covering the hole to prevent their boat from sinking, thus a violation of the rules of the challenge. Zeus was disqualified after this stage.

On Stage 3 Dawn, Miho, and Roger have to get a key from a maze on one side of a door. They will use a magnet on the other side to navigate the key. Their loved ones helped them navigate the key through the maze. the housemate with the longest time will be eliminated. Roger lost the challenge, taking him 3 hours and 21 minutes to get the key. Dawn, was the lead with 37 minutes, and Miho with 3 hours and 3 minutes.

On Stage 4, Dawn, Miho must hold a flag until the end. The housemate who held it the longest wins. Dawn emerged as the winner of the challenge, and was given the slot.

Housemate	Stage 1	Stage 2	Stage 3	Stage 4
Dawn	Advanced	Advanced	Advanced	Finalist
Miho	Advanced	Advanced	Advanced	Eliminated
Roger	Advanced	Advanced	Eliminated	
Zeus	Advanced	Disqualified		
Tommy	Eliminated			

Preceded by All In	Pinoy Big Brother: 737; Part 1, Part 2 (June 20, 2015–November 8, 2015)	Succeeded by Lucky 7
