= Pinoy Big Brother: 737 =

- Season 6
- Presented by: Toni Gonzaga; Bianca Gonzalez; Mariel Rodriguez; Robi Domingo; Enchong Dee
- No. of days: 142
- No. of housemates: 26
- Winners: Miho Nishida; Jimboy Martin
- Runners-up: Tommy Esguerra; Ylona Garcia

Release
- Original network: ABS-CBN
- Original release: June 20 – November 8, 2015

Season chronology
- ← Previous; All In Next → Lucky Season 7

The sixth season of the reality game show Pinoy Big Brother, subtitled 737, aired on ABS-CBN for 142 days from June 20 to November 8, 2015.

This is the second consecutive "special" season to air since a combination of teen and adult housemates lived in one house. This is also the first special season to not include celebrities, the first season in the series to be divided into parts: the first part for the teenagers, and the second part for the adults, and the first and only season to date to feature two winners. The season coincided with the tenth year of the Big Brother franchise in the Philippines.

The season had set the record for the longest special season since All In by 22 days; it would later be broken thrice, first by Lucky 7 by 93 days, second by Otso by 126 days, and third by Kumunity 10 by 84 days. However, this season currently holds the record for the longest special season without the inclusion of celebrities by 43 days against Connect and Gen 11's 99 days.

Miho Nishida and Jimboy Martin were declared winners of this season, while Tommy Esguerra and Ylona Garcia were the runners-up. Franco Rodriguez and Bailey May from the teens and Roger Lucero and Dawn Chang from the adults finished as finalists.

== Development ==
Less than a month after the conclusion of Pinoy Big Brother: All In, the Pinoy Big Brother production team announced that work was underway for developing the sixth regular season. On January 28, 2015, ABS-CBN released a teaser with highlights of the past seasons and editions, including the big winners. The logo is inside the zero of a number 10, a symbol for the celebration of the 10 years of Pinoy Big Brother.

On February 23, 2015, Toni Gonzaga renewed her contract with her network; in the contract signing, Gonzaga revealed that she will be back to host the show. It was also revealed that the show will air in June 2015. On May 28, 2015, the show aired a teaser stating that the season's title will be called as Pinoy Big Brother: 737, with the three and both sevens alluding to the show's ten years.

On June 7, 2015, the show aired a teaser stating that the show will return on June 20, 2015.

=== Auditions ===
Cities in the Philippines where the auditions for the Pinoy Big Brother: 737 were held.
Cities overseas where the auditions for the Pinoy Big Brother: 737 were held.

On February 14, 2015, the show announced that auditions would start in March 2015. On March 2, 2015, ABS-CBN, through its interactive mobile service called ABS-CBNmobile, launched a fast method for an early audition schedule on March 6, 2015. By this method, the first 2,000 auditionees will be booked for the auditions. Auditions were also held overseas in San Francisco Bay Area and Tokyo. Online auditions were held from April 13 to May 10, 2015, accepting auditionees locally and abroad. A total of 32,673 people auditioned across 10 key cities in the Philippines, 130 in the United States, 98 in Japan and 96 in Australia; 516 people also auditioned via online.

The following were the schedule and locations for the auditions of Pinoy Big Brother: 737:

Date	Location	Venue
Auditions held in the Philippines
March 6 and 7, 2015	Quezon City	Araneta Coliseum
March 13 and 14, 2015	Mandaue City, Cebu	Pacific Mall Mandaue
March 20 and 21, 2015	Lucena City, Quezon	Pacific Mall Lucena
March 28 and 29, 2015	Santiago City	Robinsons Place Santiago
April 9 and 10, 2015	Dagupan	CSI City Mall
April 17 and 18, 2015	General Santos	KCC Mall of GenSan
April 24 and 25, 2015	Davao City	Abreeza
April 27 and 28, 2015	Bacolod	Gaisano Grand City Mall
May 5 and 6, 2015	Cagayan de Oro	SM City Cagayan de Oro
May 8 and 9, 2015	Legazpi, Albay	Pacific Mall Legazpi
May 12, 2015	Quezon City	PBB Multi Purpose Hall
Auditions held overseas
April 12, 2015	Redwood City, California, United States	Studio TFC
April 19, 2015	Tokyo, Japan	ABS-CBN Japan Office, Roppongi
May 16, 2015	Sydney, New South Wales, Australia	ABS-CBN Australia Office, Baulkham Hills

=== Companion shows ===
The show's companion show, Pinoy Big Brother: 737 Gold, started airing on June 22, 2015, at 4:00PM (PST) from Mondays to Fridays as part of the Kapamilya Gold block. It aired its final episode on August 21, 2015, being replaced by new shows on the same block. Pinoy Big Brother: 737 Online airs every Mondays to Fridays at 7:37PM (PST) on the network's 24/7 channel on cable, the show's website, and replays 12:00AM (PST) on Jeepney TV, ABS-CBN's sister cable channel.

== Overview ==
=== The House ===
The facade of the house now extends to the previous facade of Pinoy Dream Academy but the house's floor plan still remained unchanged since Pinoy Big Brother: Teen Edition 4 aside from those few modifications. The House Concept for this season is all about Pinoy Pop. Inspired by the mix of modern and classic Filipino Pop Culture, it was designed by J-Designs featuring the graphic illustrations by Rocketship Creative Design Lab.

The Living Room featured the different placards and signage of different routes of the most iconic mode of transportation in the country, the Jeepney which was also featured in the house as a pop up design.

The Dining and Kitchen Area was inspired by the Filipino fiesta and it features a replica of the iconic Sorbetes cart that served as the kitchen island. It also featured a Burger stand, a Fishball cart as a pop up wallpaper.

The Bedrooms were now larger than the three previous seasons. The Boys' Bedroom design featured large bottle caps or tansans with some Filipino words of courtesy and wise phrases inscribed in those tansans. The Girls' Bedroom featured large abaniko fans, which were part of the accessories of a classic Filipino women and it shows femininity. The confession room featured graphic tile patterns and traditional Capiz windows. The chair looks like a remnant of a calesa.

The garden still retained the swimming pool that dominated the whole area. The activity area also remained featuring different traditional Filipino games as murals.

=== Hosts ===
The season was hosted by Toni Gonzaga, Bianca Gonzalez, Robi Domingo and Enchong Dee. Mariel Rodriguez, who served as the last celebrity houseguest, returned to the show after five years to host the Big Night.

=== Format changes ===
Evictions now take place in a studio in ABS-CBN, similar to the eviction venues of the first season until the first teen edition. Evicted housemates are still greeted by a crowd outside the House, and then transferred to the studio for an interview. Evictions are now held on Fridays, and nominations Saturday, leaning away from the usual Saturday evictions and Sunday nominations. Unlike in previous seasons, the public may only vote one housemate per mobile number per week. On Day 133, as the show opens the voting lines again for the finale night, it was revealed that two winners will be named this season, one for each batch of housemates. It will be held in two finale nights.

=== Twists ===
Season Twists

- 737: The meaning of the subtitle for the season 737 was revealed as the season progressed:
  - In the launch night, the first 7 revealed that the teen housemates will be staying in the house for seven weeks.
  - 3 refers to the three celebrity houseguests, Mariel, Enchong and Karla, that stayed in the House.
  - Big Brother revealed the meaning of the second 7 on his ten-year anniversary: it was a challenge to the regular housemates and the winners of previous seasons in the form of a "Big Mission". The mission was to raise P3 million in seven weeks to build a community of twenty houses for twenty families.
- Two Winners: Two winners were named for this season: one from the teens, and one from the adults.

Gameplay Twists

- 7:37 Challenges: The housemates must complete the task given by Big Brother within the time limit of 7 minutes and 37 seconds or 7 hours and 37 minutes for them to win the challenge.
- Ligtask Challenges: Similar to the Insta Save twist used in the previous season, nominated housemates compete in one or more challenges, where the winner will be saved from facing the public vote.
- Power of One: The public may only vote once per mobile number.
- Various Nominations: Every nomination round sees new rules set by Big Brother.
- Nomination Challenges: Nominations are solely based on various series of challenges. The list of nominees will consist of housemates who failed various series of challenges. However unlike the previous season, the safe housemate will be given a power to save one of the losing housemates from nomination in some nomination nights.
- S-E Voting System: The public may vote for the housemate they want to save or evict. This was only implemented once in every batch.
- Big Yanig (Big Shock): A series of twists that affected the normal nomination and eviction processes. In addition, three new housemates and two ex-housemates went in. See Part 2 for details.
  - Housemates' Vote to Save: Instead of facing the public vote, nominated housemates will face the non-nominated housemates' vote in terms of facing the eviction. The housemate with the lowest votes will be evicted.
  - Yanig Challengers: A part of the Big Yanig twist where ex-housemates return in the house. Only one of them will return as official housemate.
- Cross-over Housemate: Housemate Kamille Filoteo from the first part had crossed-over to the second part of the season due to the Yanig Challengers twist.
- Houseguests' Vote to Nominate: Houseguests will be given a power to nominate housemates for eviction.
- Overnight Voting: In some eviction nights, people will only be given 24 hours to vote for their favorite housemate.
- Big Jump to the Big Four: Remaining housemates compete to have a sure slot in the finals. This was only held for the regular batch.

== Batches ==
=== Teen housemates ===
According to the show's promotional ads, 22 people were shortlisted for this batch. The first batch of housemates entered the House on Day 1. 11 teens have entered; nine came from the local auditions, one from a global audition, and one from the online audition. The first seven housemates were introduced every day for five days before the launch. An additional four housemates entered on Day 2. As part of the 737 twist, the first celebrity houseguest, Enchong Dee, entered the House. Nomination rules are changed every round for four weeks. Normal eviction process were held each week, where one housemate is evicted. On Day 49, Bailey May, Franco Rodriguez, Jimboy Martin, and Ylona Garcia became finalists. On Day 50, the four finalists left the House to make way for the next batch of housemates. They returned to the house on Day 99 as houseguests. On Day 133, they became competing housemates again as the public determines the winner for this batch. On Day 141, Franco Rodriguez and Bailey May were named third and fourth placers, respectively. On the same day, voting for the remaining two housemates re-opened to determine the winner for this batch. Jimboy Martin emerged as the winner for this batch.

=== Regular housemates ===
The next set of housemates to enter are the regular housemates. According to the official ads released by the show, 21 people were shortlisted for this batch. They are housemates aged 20 and above. 13 housemates are chosen for this batch, The first six housemates entered on Day 50, while another six entered the following day. Due to a voluntary exit, a new housemate entered on Day 77. Due to the Big Yanig twist, two new housemates entered respectively on Days 80 and 81. A wildcard housemate and cross-over housemate entered on Day 84, however only one of them will return as official housemate. One housemate claimed the first spot in the final four during the Big Jump to the Big Four challenge. On Day 133, the public determines the winner for this batch. On Day 141, Roger Lucero and Dawn Chang were named third and fourth placers, respectively. On the same day, voting for the remaining two housemates re-opened to determine the winner for this batch. Miho Nishida emerged as the winner for this batch.

== Tenth year commemorations ==
=== Additional content ===
On June 19, 2015, a day before the official launch, the show gave loyal auditionees a chance to become a housemate for a day. Ten were invited but nine showed up. They participated in classic tasks like the domino task.

The show released a documentary online about the audition process of the show for the past ten years. It documented the evolution of the show's audition process and how these auditions changed the lives of the auditionees, as well as a quick look at how auditionees reflect the Philippine society, in general. There were commentaries from Laurenti Dyogi and Linggit Tan, the show's business heads, writer Ricky Lee, and anecdotes from people who have auditioned for the show multiple times. This was first shown as a three-part series in the first episodes of Pinoy Big Brother: 737 Online.

ABS-CBN's sister cable channel, Jeepney TV, releases clips from past seasons of the show through their Facebook page. They also run a special program called Pinoy Big Brother Revisited: Teen Edition, which looked back at moments from the first Teen edition.

Carrying from All In, Big Brother launches Online Bahay ni Kuya (Online Big Brother House) as a Facebook app for anyone to enter. They will participate in online tasks and vote up or vote down other online housemates to earn points. The housemates with most points earned will be part of the top ten housemates, and eventually the final four housemates. The winner at the end will receive P100,000 and other prizes.

During the finale, a special song entitled Salamat Pinoy (Thank You Pinoy) was sung, made for the tenth anniversary of Pinoy Big Brother.

=== Tasks ===
On week 4, Bailey and Ylona must learn 500 Tagalog words to pass their weekly task. To help them memorize more words, Big Brother asked them to sing Magmahal Muli by season 1 housemates Say Alonzo and Sam Milby. They were also tasked to translate the song to English, line by line, to test if they did understand the meaning of the song. They eventually recorded their own rendition of the song. The following week, week 5, housemates were tasked to take part in a house concert. On their performance day on Day 35, several housemates from the past seasons became special judges for the concert. These ex-housemates decided which group should win immunity for the next nomination round. The majority chose the group of Bailey, Franco, Kyle, and Ylona.

As part of the second 7 twist, the regular housemates, together with the previous winners, the 737 teen finalists, and hosts of the show, started selling teddy bears on Day 70 to raise their target of P3,000,000 in seven weeks. The regular housemates' fourth weekly task also aims to earn at least P100,000 to be added to the fund by holding a two-day food fest. 737 teen housemates, and winners Nene Tamayo and Keanna Reeves became servers for the customers. At the end, housemates won the weekly task with a profit of P93,385.25. Dawn, Margo, Miho, and Richard were saved from nomination with a profit of P47,491. Charlhone, Krizia, Mikee, and Roger earned P45,894.25, therefore, placing them in the nominations list on week 12.

== Big Weekend at the Big Night ==
Prior to Days 141 and 142, The Teen and Regular Big 4 were given a surprise send-off in It's Showtime by Big Brother on November 6, Friday wherein he said that the Big Night will be held at the Albay Astrodome and Penaranda Park in Legazpi, Albay, and were then transported to a bus outside the Showtime studio (despite the fact that they are still wearing their bathrobes because they were swimming at the Resort area of the house but later changed). Upon arrival, they were greeted by Enchong and Robi at the Cagsawa Ruins.

Throughout the entire 2-day Big Night, spectacular production numbers were spearheaded by mainstay host Toni Gonzaga, together with all other housemates and Big Winners of the past 10 years were Nene Tamayo of Season 1, Keanna Reeves of Celebrity Edition 1, Kim Chiu of Teen Edition 1, Ejay Falcon of Teen Edition Plus, Myrtle Sarrosa of Teen Edition 4 and Daniel Matsunaga of All In including the 737 teen and regular housemates. The 7-day open voting was closed and the first set of announcements were made. Bailey May and Dawn Chang were named as 4th Teen and Regular Big Placers respectively while Franco Rodriguez and Roger Lucero were named as 3rd Teen and Regular Big Placers.

When the final two were about to anticipate the announcement of the Big Winner, Toni announced that the next set of announcements would be done the following night and for the first time in the history of PBB and in the Big Night, voting for the final 2 was reset to zero, to which the four remaining housemates reacted in shock. Meanwhile, the table shows the final tally of votes prior to the first set of announcements and note that the codes per housemate is similar to the name of their batches (K, B, T & N for Teens spelling out Kabataan and R, E, G & L for Regulars):

Event	Big 4	Votes	Result
Event	Big 4	Percentage	Result
Teen Big 4	Bailey	7.58%	4th Place
Teen Big 4	Jimboy	36.97%	Advanced
Teen Big 4	Franco	20.71%	3rd Place
Teen Big 4	Ylona	34.74%	Advanced
Total votes		100%	—N/a
Big 4	Dawn	7.79%	4th Place
Big 4	Miho	61.51%	Advanced
Big 4	Roger	9.99%	3rd Place
Big 4	Tommy	20.71%	Advanced
Total votes		100%	—N/a

During the second day of The Big Night, the mission of collecting P3,000,000 was achieved and the proceeds were given to Habitat for Humanity Philippines for the benefit of the construction of new houses in local communities of Bohol which were severely devastated by Typhoon Yolanda, spearheaded by Slater Young, PBB: Unlimited Big Winner. After the 24-hour open voting, the second set of announcements were made. Ylona Garcia was declared as the 2nd Teen Big Placer, and Jimboy Martin was declared the Teen Big Winner of this edition by a close number of votes. Despite the fact that they made their relationship throughout the entire season, Tommy Esguerra was declared the 2nd Big Placer while Miho Nishida was declared this edition's Big Winner by a huge margin.

All Big Placers were transported from the Albay Astrodome to the stage just a few meters away to Penaranda Park through ATV vehicles, while Miho and Jimboy did the same thing, but this time, as part of the tradition of Big Winners, made their grand exit through the prop- base platform of the Cagsawa Ruins riding together in their ATV vehicle with showers of confetti.

These two nights also marked the absence of Bianca Gonzalez (due to her pregnancy) and the return of Mariel Rodriguez as host after five years, similar to that of Gonzaga in the Big Night of the first Teen Edition and prior to her role as the last celebrity houseguest.

The table shows the final summary of votes for the final two for each batch.

Event	Big 2	Votes	Result
Event	Big 2	Percentage	Result
Teen Big 2	Ylona	43.24%	Runner-up
Teen Big 2	Jimboy	56.76%	Winner
Total votes		100%	—N/a
Big 2	Miho	81.96%	Winner
Big 2	Tommy	18.04%	Runner-up
Total votes		100%	—N/a

== Notable people ==
Maine Mendoza auditioned for PBB 737 but failed to make it to the final line-up.

Preceded by All In	Pinoy Big Brother: 737; Part 1, Part 2 (June 20, 2015–November 8, 2015)	Succeeded by Lucky 7
