= Tommy Esguerra =

Filipino-American actor and host

- Born: June 5, 1994 (age 31); Long Beach, California, United States
- Occupations: Actor; host
- Years active: 2005–2020
- Agent(s): Star Magic (2015–2018); Mercator Artist and Model Management, Inc.

Tommy Esguerra is a Filipino-American former actor and television host. He is known as the love team partner of Miho Nishida and the Second Big Placer of Pinoy Big Brother. He is an American and grew up in California.

== Career ==
Esguerra worked on the Regal Films movie Foolish Hearts along with Miho Nishida, his ex-girlfriend whom he met inside the Pinoy Big Brother house in 2015.

He works for ABS-CBN Star Magic and participated in Pinoy Big Brother 737 where Miho was one of the grand winners.

Tommy appeared in the TV series Langit Lupa. He worked as a brand ambassador for Globe Telecoms along with LA Aguinaldo. He appeared in Preview Magazine, along with Nishida, as well as Garage Magazine (along with Tanner Mata).

Esguerra is an SM Youth ambassador of four years now as well as the face of Axe, along with LA Aguinaldo and David Guison. He also became the cover of the book Dolce Amore's “Christian and Anne” from Kiko Laxa Ferrer's Kikodora Social Serye brand of ABS-CBN Publishing Inc.

In July 2017, Tommy confessed to having a crush on Maris Racal on ASAP Chillout.

In May 2019, he ended his two-year relationship with former GirlTrends member Kelley Day.

As of 2022, he lives in California.

== Filmography ==
=== Film ===
- 2017 – Foolish Love
- 2018 – Three Words to Forever as Kyle

=== Television ===
- 2015 – Pinoy Big Brother: 737 as himself
- 2016–2017 – Langit Lupa as Keith "Kit" Principe
- 2018–2020 – Umagang Kay Ganda as himself / co-host
