= Pinoy Big Brother: 737 – Part 1 =

Reality game show episode

The first part of Pinoy Big Brother: 737 began on June 20, 2015, and ended on August 8, 2015, lasting 50 days. This was part of the tenth year season of Big Brother in the Philippines. It was hosted by Toni Gonzaga, Bianca Gonzales, Robi Domingo and Enchong Dee. The show aired on ABS-CBN. at 10:00 p.m. (PST) every Mondays to Sundays.

The first batch of housemates that entered on Day 1 were teen housemates. 11 teens entered the house. The median age of this batch was 15 years old. An eviction was held every week where one housemate was evicted, until the seventh week, where two housemates were evicted. One housemate opted for a voluntary exit. On Day 50, the four finalists of this batch exited the House. On Day 84, one housemate from this batch crossed over to another batch of housemates. On Day 99, during It's Showtime, the four finalists were instructed to return to the House. On Day 133, after Zeus Collins was evicted, voting for the winner of this batch opened. On Day 141, Franco Rodriguez and Bailey May were named third and fourth placers, respectively. On the same day, voting for the remaining two housemates re-opened to determine the winner for this batch.

Jimboy Martin emerged as the winner for this batch.

== Housemates ==
Before the launch, on June 15 to 19, the first seven teen housemates were introduced at different ABS-CBN programs, It's Showtime, TV Patrol, then had their first exclusive interview on Aquino & Abunda Tonight before formally introduced during the launch. Four more housemates were introduced on Day 2 via ASAP 20 and directly enter the house after the introduction.

The ages indicated are the housemates' ages when they first entered the House. Origin indicates where the housemates were born or based before joining the program.

Name	Age on entry	Hometown	Entered	Exited	Result	Ref.
Jimboy Martin	17	Solano, Nueva Vizcaya	Day 1 Day 99	Day 50; Day 142	Winner	
Ylona Garcia	13	Sydney, Australia	Day 2 Day 99	Day 50; Day 142	Runner-up	
Franco Rodriguez	16	Tabaco, Albay	Day 2 Day 99	Day 50; Day 141	3rd Place	
Bailey May	12	Norwich, United Kingdom	Day 1 Day 99	Day 50; Day 142	4th Place	
Kenzo Gutierrez	18	Quezon City	Day 1	Day 49	Evicted	
Kamille Filoteo	18	Manila	Day 1 Day 84	Day 47; Day 86	Evicted	
Zonia Mejia	13	Quezon City	Day 2	Day 42	Evicted	
Kyle Secades	17	San Juan City	Day 2	Day 36	Voluntary exit	
Ryan Bacalla	14	Cebu City	Day 1	Day 28	Evicted	
Ailah Antopina	13	Bacolod	Day 1	Day 21	Evicted	
Barbie Imperial	16	Legazpi, Albay	Day 1	Day 14	Evicted	

=== Houseguests ===
In its last two weeks, the show revealed that 3 in 737 means three celebrity houseguests. They will have their own missions inside the House. The first one is Enchong Dee, entered on Day 37, was tasked to be a toy robot to the housemates. Other houseguests were Georcelle Dapat of G-Force, Enrique Gil, Jolina Magdangal, Nyoy Volante impersonating Ariana Grande, Bea Alonzo, Richard Gomez, and Dawn Zulueta.

== Chronology of events ==
Note that Day 1 started on June 20, 2015.

=== Week 1 ===
On Day 1, Ryan, Kenzo, Jimboy, Bailey, Barbie and Kamille were the first teen housemates that had entered the house. Right after, they were given a task to determine the lock combinations of the confession room in order for them to meet the 7th teen housemate, Ailah; though they failed to completely get the exact combinations, they were able to open the door locks thus freeing Ailah from the said room. On Day 2, the second batch of housemates were introduced via ASAP 20. Enchong Dee was also introduced as a new host; and as one of the show's traditions with its hosts, Enchong had to stay inside the house. On the same day, Enchong was tasked to deliver a box, filled with things from the housemates' parents, without being noticed by them; he was successful. Afterwards, the housemates were called for an activity in the pool area, where they had to transfer 11 boxes using a big plane and ropes without getting wet; they were able to transfer 10 boxes. On that night, Bailey was called to the confession room for several violations. Right afterwards, all the remaining boys along with Barbie were called to the confession room for not wearing their lapel microphones. On Day 3, Bailey was punished to become a human speaker box and to remain as is until Big Brother had told him otherwise. On Day 4, the housemates were given their weekly task wherein they had to create a group performance showing their individual talents within 7 minutes and 37 seconds.

On Day 7, the housemates performed their weekly task; they were not successful after three tries. On the evening of Day 8, the nominees were revealed in the nomination night. The first nominees were Barbie, Kamille and Bailey; however, Kamille was removed from the list of nominees after winning the Ligtask Challenge.

=== Week 2 ===
On Day 10, the housemates were given their second weekly task wherein they were required to form a design that makes the numbers 737 visible out of popsicle stick pops. Zonia is the leader of the task. On Day 14, Barbie was evicted from the house after garnering the fewest votes against Bailey.

=== Week 3 ===
On Day Day 15, the second set of nominees were revealed. The second nominees were Ailah, Bailey, Ryan, Ylona and Zonia. The nominees were given a chance to save themselves in the "Ligtask" Challenge; however, no one win the challenge, therefore all of the nominees were still up for eviction. On Day 20, they performed their weekly task "OKA YONIP" were in they performed the reversed play of the song "Pinoy Ako". They were successful. On Day 21, Ailah was evicted from the house after garnering the fewest votes against Bailey, Ryan, Ylona and Zonia.

=== Week 4 ===
On Day 22, the housemates had their "Positive Nomination" wherein they need to choose which housemate is deserving to stay in the house. Franco, Jimboy, Kenzo and Kyle were the top 4 highest pointers and they are saved in the possible eviction. Bailey, Kamille, Ryan, Ylona and Zonia were up for eviction; however, Bailey was saved in the "Ligtask" Challenge and leaving Kamille, Ryan, Ylona and Zonia as the nominees for the week. On Day 28, Ryan was evicted from the house after garnering the fewest votes against Kamille, Ylona and Zonia.

=== Week 5 ===
On Day 30, the housemates were given their fifth weekly task. They were grouped into two groups: the "Dream Team" composed of Kyle, Ylona, Bailey and Franco, and the "Pinoy Big Brothers & Sisters" composed of Jimboy, Kenzo, Kamille and Zonia. All of them were required to make 7 production numbers. Each of the 7 numbers must trend on Twitter for them to win the task; however, each group must still outperform one another in order wherein the winning group will win immunity for the next week's nomination. On Day 33, Kyle decided to make a voluntary exit despite winning the Ligtask challenge. On several days during the week, Nyoy Volante (while impersonating as Ariana Grande), Enrique Gil and Jolina Magdangal entered the house to mentor the housemates for their upcoming concert.

On Day 35, the two groups performed their 7 numbers for their Big-Ating Concert. The concert was attended by several ex-housemates from the franchise's three editions. After the housemates had performed their concert, Kyle had revealed to the other housemates that he had decided to make a voluntary exit. Kyle left the house on Day 36. On the same day, the result of the challenge for the two groups were revealed. It was announced that the "Dream Team" won the challenge, thus they are immune from the nominations for next week. The team also received a hundred thousand pesos which they will give to their chosen charity, the Bantay Bata 163. On the other hand, the members of "Pinoy Big Brothers & Sisters" were automatically nominated. After the announcements of the nominees, the Ligtask challenge followed. The said challenge was won by Kenzo.

=== Week 6 ===
On Day 37, Enchong Dee was revealed as the first celebrity houseguest of the season that will temporarily stay inside the house. He was first tasked to pretend as a human-size robot toy. On Day 39, the housemates were given their sixth weekly task. They must rally the volleyball 737 times without letting it fall in the water. However, Big Brother gave Jimboy, Kamille, Zonia, and Ylona a chance to decrease the number of rallies by flying on a flyboard. The number of seconds they stay in the flyboard will be decreased to the 737 rallies needed to win the task. They earned 91 seconds overall, decreasing the required rallies to 646. Throughout the days, housemates were able to use the other apps on the Big Tablet (see table below). Bailey used the Ligtas app, saving him from the next nomination. On Day 42, Zonia was evicted from the house after garnering the fewest votes against Jimboy and Kamille. On Day 43, Big Brother revert to the normal nomination process, but he let the housemates listen to what their loved ones have to say on whom they should nominate. At the end of the process, Franco, Kenzo, Kamille, and Ylona were up for eviction, but Kenzo won the Ligtask challenge, leaving Franco, Kamille, and Ylona to face the public vote. It was announced that eviction will take place on Day 47.

=== Week 7 ===
On Day 44, Big Brother instructed the housemates to sort their personal stuff and put it in the boxes: Akin (Mine) – these things will be kept by the housemates, Alay (Give) – these will be given to people in need, and Ayaw (Do Not Want) – these will be thrown away as of Big Brother's discretion. After packing, they were instructed to stay in the bedroom as the ninjas take away more furniture from the House. Big Brother gave them a challenge to live without basic necessities at hand. They have to fish these items, that were scattered on the garden area, from behind a barricade. The bedrooms became off limits as well. Come night time, Enchong was instructed to host a fake Big Night event. Bailey and Ylona were removed from the roster, making Franco, Jimboy, Kenzo, and Kamille as "finalists." Eventually, Franco was named the "winner"; Jimboy, Kamille, and Kenzo came in second, third, and fourth place, respectively. With this in mind, Bailey and Ylona were moved to the garden area, where they'll be living separately from the other housemates. On Day 45, both groups were given a buzzer. If the four "finalists" think they deserve to stay, they must press the buzzer; in turn, Bailey and Ylona will be "evicted". If Bailey and Ylona think they deserve to stay, they must press the buzzer; in turn, they must pick two from the "finalists" who should be "evicted", in place of them. Bailey and Ylona buzzed first, and they chose Kenzo and Kamille to be "evicted." On Day 47, Kamille was evicted from the house after garnering the fewest votes against Franco and Ylona. On Day 48, Bailey, together with a street child, celebrated his birthday with the housemates. On Day 49, four thrones were placed inside at the four finalists. In the eviction, Bailey, Franco, Jimboy, and Ylona became finalists. Kenzo was the last evictee of this batch, garnering -9.38% of the net votes. By Day 50, the finalists exit the House.

== Tasks and challenges ==
=== Weekly tasks ===
Task No.	Date given	Task title and description	Result
1	June 23 (Day 4)	Ang Galing Natin in 737 The housemates must create a group performance showcasing each of their talents. This should last in exactly 7 minutes and 37 seconds; they were only given 3 chances to perfect the task.	Failed
2	June 30 (Day 10)	Popsicle Stick Chain The housemates must form a design that makes the numbers 737 visible out of popsicle stick pops.	Failed
3	July 5 (Day 15)	Oka Yonip The housemates must sing "Pinoy Ako" backwards. If they fail, Kenzo and Franco will be automatically nominated.	Passed
4	July 13 (Day 24)	Learn Tagalog Words Bailey and Ylona must learn and write at least 500 Tagalog words in a giant dictionary, talk about their drawing, translate English words to Tagalog words, and complete Panatang Makabayan. This is the first secret weekly task of this season.	Passed
5	July 19 (Day 30)	The Big-Ating Concert Each housemate must showcase his/her own talent. Housemates should be able to make seven production numbers. In order to succeed in this weekly task, seven performances must trend in Twitter nationwide. However, the performances do not have to trend at the same time.	Passed
6	July 28 (Day 39)	Pool Volleyball The housemates must rally a volleyball in the pool 737 times without letting it fall on the water. The number of rallies are reduced to 646. See Week 6 for details.	Failed

=== 7:37 ===
The housemates had to finish a task within 7 minutes and 37 seconds.

Date given	Task recipient(s)	Task title and description	Rewards	Result
June 20 (Day 1)	Ryan, Kenzo, Jimboy, Bailey, Barbie, Kamille	The housemates had to run over a rotating platform in order to reveal a lock combination that will be used to free the 7th housemate (Ailah) who was still hidden in the confession room.	Ailah (seventh housemate)	Passed

=== Ligtask ===
Nominated housemates had to compete in challenges in order to save themselves from eviction. In case of ties, no one will be saved.

Date given	Ligtask recipient(s)	Ligtask description	Winner
June 27 (Day 8)	Bailey, Barbie, Kamille	The nominated housemates had to shoot several balls in nets marked as 7-3-7 which were placed in a slippery inclined plane. A ball shot at 7 containers indicated that housemate gained 7 points, while at the 3 container indicates 3 points. The housemate who had garnered most points within two minutes will be saved from eviction.	Kamille; 70 points
July 4 (Day 15)	Ylona, Ryan, Bailey, Ailah, Zonia	The nominated housemates had to slingshot other housemates placed in movable carts onto an archery-like board. The board has a three-point system tier: the inner circle (3 points), middle circle (2 points) and the outer circle (1 point). Each of them are given three tries in order to accumulate the highest number of points.	Ylona and Ailah; 2 points
July 11 (Day 22)	Kamille, Bailey, Ylona, Zonia, Ryan	The nominated housemates had to put foam "money" (50, 100, 500 and 1000) as much as possible into a giant piggy bank. The higher the amount, the harder it is to put into the giant piggy bank. Each of them are only given one minute to do it.	Bailey; 1,100 points
July 18 (Day 29)	Kamille-Franco, Kenzo-Bailey, Kyle-Jimboy, Ylona-Zonia	With the help of their immuned partner, the nominated housemates must pick letters from a pabitin that corresponds to the word LIGTAS. Their immuned partner must jump from a trampoline so the pabitin can be lowered. Each of them are only given one minute to do the challenge. The housemate who finishes the task the fastest wins.	Kyle; 56 seconds
July 25 (Day 36)	Kamille, Zonia, Kenzo, Jimboy	The nominees are given ten tennis balls to throw at their corresponding portraits. In order to succeed, they need to flip over their picture to earn a point. The most self-portraits flipped in the shortest time wins.	Kenzo; 2 points - 37 seconds
August 1 (Day 43)	Kamille, Ylona, Kenzo, Franco	Nominees play a quiz game about houseguest, Enchong. To answer his questions, they must get the answer blocks at the bottom of the pool and place it on a container. The first one to place the correct answer gets one point; the nominee who reaches four points first wins.	Kenzo; 4 points

=== The Big Tablet ===
On week 6, the housemates were given a Big Tablet, which contains "apps" they can use. The Big Tablet is available for a week, and it has ten battery bars. One battery bar is deducted for every app they use. Below are the "apps", and their corresponding definitions. They can use these apps at any time, and they can use it multiple times. Their first app, Games, was given as a "free trial", therefore no battery bars were deducted.

App name	Description	App user(s)
Games	They are given games they used to play as children, such as jackstones, sipa, and a Barbie doll.	All housemates
Tawag (Call)	Housemates get a call from their loved ones for a limited time.	Kamille, Franco
Outside World Adventure	Housemates get to take a vacation outside the House.^{BT1}	Jimboy, Kamille, Ylona, Zonia
Silip-Bahay (House Peek)	Housemates get to see what's happening in their own households outside.	Zonia
Panood (Watch)	Housemates can watch a video about Pinoy Big Brother.	Kenzo
Tulong (Help)	Housemates get to help someone close to them who is in need.	Jimboy^{BT2}
Kitakits (See You)	Housemates get to bond with someone close to them from the outside world.	Enchong
Take Out	Housemates can take out and eat their favorite food from outside.	Bailey
Relaks (Relax)	Housemates get a pampering session.	Ylona
Ligtas (Save)	Housemates can save themselves from nomination.	Bailey

- ^BT1 Only four housemates can use the app one time. This was determined by a task.
- ^BT2 Jimboy, Kenzo, and Ylona wanted to use the app, but only one of them can. This was determined by holding beads on their arms for 3 hours. One gram is equivalent to Php100. The most number of grams retained, wins the app. Jimboy won the task, therefore he has the full money to give to a friend in need. As for Kenzo and Ylona, their money was cut in half, also to give to a loved one in need.

== Nomination history ==
In every nomination, each housemate has to nominate two people with the first receiving two points and the second with one point. Starting with the second nomination round, new rules are being set by Big Brother. The normal nomination process was used on the sixth nomination round. See notes below for details.

Pinoy Big Brother: 737 - Part 1 nomination history
	#1	#2	Positive Nominations	PinaSaya Challenge	Big-ating Concert	#6	#7	Exit of Teen Big 4	Big Night		Nominations received
	#1	#2	#3	#4	#5	#6	#7	Exit of Teen Big 4	Big Night		Nominations received
Eviction Day and Date	Day 14 July 3	Day 21 July 10	Day 28 July 17	Day 36 July 25	Day 42 July 31	Day 47 August 5	Day 49 August 7	Day 50 August 8	Day 141 November 7	Day 142 November 8	Nominations received
Nomination Day and Date	Day 8 June 27	Day 15; July 4	Day 22; July 11	Day 29; July 18	Day 36; July 25	Day 43; August 1	Day 47; August 5	Day 49; August 7	Day 133; October 30	Day 141; November 7	Nominations received
Jimboy	Barbie; Kyle	Ailah; Zonia	Franco; Kyle	Bailey	No nominations	Kamille; Ylona	No nominations	Finalist (Exited, Day 50)	Advanced	Winner	2 (+1; -9)
Ylona	Barbie; Bailey	Ailah; Ryan	Kyle; Ryan	Not eligible	No nominations	Kenzo; Jimboy	No nominations	Finalist (Exited, Day 50)	Advanced	Runner-up	10 (+1)
Franco	Kenzo; Ailah	Bailey; Ylona	Jimboy; Ryan	Bailey	No nominations	Ylona; Kenzo	No nominations	Finalist (Exited, Day 50)	3rd Place	Exited (Day 141)	4 (-4)
Bailey	Ylona; Zonia	Ailah; Zonia	Kenzo; Franco	Not eligible	No nominations	Kamille; Jimboy	No nominations	Finalist (Exited, Day 50)	4th Place	Exited (Day 141)	8 (-1)
Kenzo	Barbie; Ylona	Ylona; Zonia	Jimboy; Kyle	Not eligible	No nominations	Franco; Kamille	No nominations	Evicted (Day 49)			7 (+2; -4)
Kamille	Barbie; Bailey	Ailah; Ryan	Kenzo; Jimboy	Not eligible	No nominations	Franco; Kenzo	Evicted (Day 47)				9 (+2; -1)
Zonia	Barbie; Ailah	Bailey; Ylona	Kyle; Kamille	Bailey	No nominations	Evicted (Day 42)					3 (+1)
Kyle	Barbie; Ailah	Ylona; Zonia	Jimboy; Franco	Not eligible	Voluntary Exit (Day 36)						1 (+1; -7)
Ryan	Bailey; Barbie	Bailey; Ylona	Jimboy; Kyle	Evicted (Day 28)							1 (-2)
Ailah	Kamille; Barbie	Bailey; Ylona	Evicted (Day 21)								7
Barbie	Kamille; Kenzo	Evicted (Day 14)									14
Notes	none	^{1}	^{2}	^{3}	^{4}	^{5}	^{6}^{,} ^{7}		^{8}		
Up for eviction	Bailey; Barbie; Kamille	Ailah; Bailey; Ryan; Ylona; Zonia	Bailey; Kamille; Ryan; Ylona; Zonia	Kamille; Kenzo; Kyle; Ylona	Jimboy; Kamille; Kenzo; Zonia	Franco; Kamille; Kenzo; Ylona	Open Voting				
Ligtask Winner	Kamille	none	Bailey	Kyle	Kenzo		not implemented				
Saved from eviction	Bailey; 62.16%	Bailey; 29.28% Zonia; 23.40% Ylona; 21.89% Ryan; 15.04%	Zonia; 32.16% Ylona; 28.35% Kamille; 24.86%	Kamille; Kenzo; Ylona	Jimboy; 43.85% Kamille; 30.31%	Ylona; 39.07% Franco; 33.15%	Ylona; 19.84% Jimboy; 10.90% Franco; 3.78% Bailey; 1.99%		Jimboy; 36.97% Ylona; 34.74%	Jimboy; 56.76%	
Evicted	Barbie; 37.84%	Ailah; 10.38%	Ryan; 14.63%	No Eviction	Zonia; 25.85%	Kamille; 27.78%	Kenzo -9.38%		Franco; 20.71% Bailey; 7.58%	Ylona; 43.24%	
Voluntary Exit	none			Kyle	none				Franco; 20.71% Bailey; 7.58%	Ylona; 43.24%	
References											

Legend

Granted immunity after winning a challenge or fulfilling a task
Automatically nominated
Automatically nominated, but saved by housemates' votes

Notes

1. The housemates were paired for this nomination. Each pair only has 2 points and 1 point to give to their chosen nominees. Colors indicate who are partners for this nomination round. Starting this round, housemates garnering top 3 nomination points will be nominated.
2. Each housemate must nominate those who they think deserves more to stay in the house.
3. In the special immunity challenge, Pinasaya Challenge, Franco, Jimboy and Zonia won the challenge, which grants them immunity from nomination. Aside from being immuned, they must choose between Bailey and Ylona, the team who won second place in the challenge, who they'll save from nomination. They chose Bailey.
4. Georcelle Dapat of G-Force assigned Bailey, Franco, Kyle and Ylona into Group 1 while Jimboy, Kamille, Kenzo and Zonia into Group 2. Various ex-housemates from previous seasons became judges and audiences for the two groups. The immunity will be based on the decision from the majority of the ex-housemates. Majority chose Bailey, Franco and Ylona to be saved from the upcoming nomination.
5. Bailey used the Ligtas App from the Big Tablet, saving him from nomination.
6. Save-Evict voting system became effective for this open voting.
7. No winner was revealed upon the Teen Big 4's exit despite Ylona topping the public's vote.
8. After announcing the third and fourth placers, voting was re-opened for the final two housemates.

=== Save-Evict voting result ===
Below is the breakdown of votes that took place in the final eviction round, before naming the four finalists.

Eviction no.	Housemates	Votes			Result
Eviction no.	Housemates	To-Save	To-Evict	Net	Result
6	Bailey	4.90%	-2.91%	1.99%	Finalist
6	Franco	14.84%	-11.06%	3.78%	Finalist
6	Jimboy	13.75%	-2.85%	10.90%	Finalist
6	Kenzo	4.23%	-13.61%	-9.38%	Evicted
6	Ylona	25.84%	-6.00%	19.84%	Finalist

Preceded by All In	Pinoy Big Brother: 737; Part 1, Part 2 (June 20, 2015–November 8, 2015)	Succeeded by Lucky 7
