= Jimboy Martin =

Filipino television personality

- Born: Hendrix Jim Balasoto Martin; October 12, 1997 (age 28); Solano, Nueva Vizcaya, Philippines
- Other names: Jim, Jimboy
- Occupation: Television personality
- Years active: 2015–present
- Agent: Star Magic (2015–2019; 2022–present)
- Known for: Pinoy Big Brother: 737 (Teen Big Winner)

Hendrix Jim Balasoto Martin (born October 12, 1997), known professionally as Jimboy Martin, is a Filipino television personality known for winning the teen edition of the reality show Pinoy Big Brother: 737.

He is part of the all-male dance group of It's Showtime, called "Hashtags".

== Filmography ==
=== Television ===
Year	Title	Role	Notes
2015	Pinoy Big Brother: 737	Housemate	Emerged as the Teen Big Winner
2015–2020	It's Showtime	Performer	Part of the Hashtag group
2016	Born for You	Joms	First television appearance as an actor
2018	FPJ's Ang Probinsyano (Season 4)	Redentor D. Padua	Guest Cast / Antagonist
2019	S.M.A.C. Pinoy Ito: Season 3	Host/performer	Together with his former colleague from Pinoy Big Brother: 737, Heaven Peralejo
2022	FPJ's Ang Probinsyano (Season 9)	P/Cpt. Jeremy Abalos	Guest Cast / Antagonist
2023	FPJ's Batang Quiapo	Karlo	Guest Cast / Antagonist
2024	It's Showtime	Guest Cast	"EXPecially For You" Searcher

Preceded by (Brazil) Daniel Matsunaga	Pinoy Big Brother; Big Winner; 2015	Succeeded by Maymay Entrata
Preceded by Myrtle Sarrosa	Pinoy Big Brother Teens; Big Winner; 2015	Succeeded by Maymay Entrata
