= Miho Nishida =

Filipino-born Japanese television personality

Nishida Miho
- Born: Nishida Lalic Miho; December 16, 1992 (age 33); Angono, Rizal, Philippines
- Occupation: Television personality
- Years active: 2015–present
- Children: 1

Nishida Miho (born December 16, 1992) is a Filipino-born Japanese television personality, who became the Big Winner of the second batch of Pinoy Big Brother: 737 housemates in 2015.

== Early life ==
Nishida Miho was born on December 16, 1992, in Angono, Rizal, Philippines, but her mother, who worked as an entertainer, brought her to Japan when she was two years old and single-handedly raised her there. Having been exposed to Japanese culture and language for most of her life, she only understands and speaks a little English. She is a single mother; her daughter Aimi was born in 2010.

== Career ==
After winning Pinoy Big Brother: 737 – Part 2, Nishida joined the cast of It's Showtime, partaking in its "Tomiho Realiserye" current segment, along with her co-competitor and ex-boyfriend Tommy Esguerra. She's also a former member of All Female Dance Group Girltrends.

== Filmography ==
=== Film ===
| Year | Title | Role | Notes | Ref. |
|---|---|---|---|---|
| 2017 | Foolish Love | Lea | | |
| 2017 | Haunted Forest | Elena | | |

=== Television ===
| Year | Title | Role | Notes |
|---|---|---|---|
| 2015 | Pinoy Big Brother: 737 – Part 2 | Herself | Housemate / Big Winner |
| 2015 | Kapamilya, Deal or No Deal | Herself | Player |
| 2015 | It's Showtime | Herself | Segment: ToMiho A Love Realiserye |
| 2016 | Funny Ka, Pare Ko | Neneng | |
| 2016 | Maalaala Mo Kaya | Herself | Episode: "Bahay" |
| 2016–2017 | Langit Lupa | Cindy Manlangit | Supporting Role |
| 2017 | Maalaala Mo Kaya | Abby | Episode: "Salon" |
| 2017 | La Luna Sangre | Myka | Guest Role |
| 2017 | Ipaglaban Mo! | Hazel | Episode: "Bihag" |
| 2018 | Since I Found You | Maggie | Guest Role |

== Concerts/Tours ==
In December 2017, Miho held her first ever major concert "Miho: I Am Unstoppable" in Music Museum with special guests JV "Young JV" Kapunan, Zeus Collins, Mikee Agustin and Yexel Sebastian.

In February 2018, together with her rumored boyfriend JV Kapunan formerly known as "Young JV" had their post Valentines Pop up concert titled "It's Happening! A night with JHo".

In April 2018, Miho joined Kisses Delavin and Thony Labrusca in a Singapore concert.

== Discography ==
In February 2018, JV Kapunan released his first single for 2018 entitled "123" featuring Miho in three languages which talks about their story on how they met.

It's also Miho's first recording of original song. Music Video was released March 9, 2018 shot in Boracay by International Director and Choreographer Lenny Dela Peña popularly known as Lenny Len.

Music and Lyrics by Toronto Base singer- songwriter Andrew Briol and Filipino singer- songwriter Thyro Alfaro. The Japanese part of the Lyrics was translated by Miho herself.

| Preceded by (Brazil) Daniel Matsunaga | Pinoy Big Brother; Big Winner; 2015 | Succeeded by Maymay Entrata |
| Preceded by (Brazil) Daniel Matsunaga | Pinoy Big Brother Regular Season; Big Winner; 2015 | Succeeded by Yamyam Gucong |
