= Daniel Matsunaga =

Brazilian model, actor, footballer, host and businessman

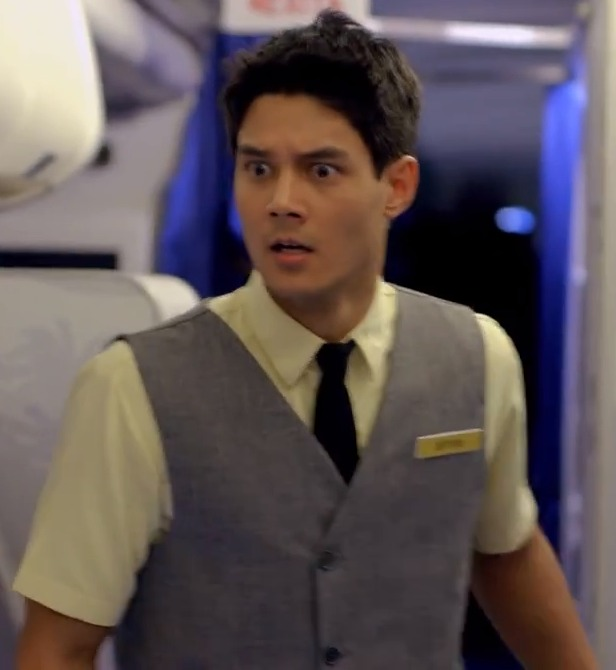
- Matsunaga in Shake, Rattle & Roll XV (2014)
- Born: Daniel Kenji Silva Matsunaga; November 28, 1988 (age 37); Brasília, Brazil
- Occupations: Model; actor; athlete; host
- Years active: 2009–2021
- Agent(s): GMA Artist Center (2010–2012); Talent5 (2012–2014); Star Magic (2014–2021); Brightlight Productions (2020–2021); Mercator Model and Artist Management, Inc. (2009-2026); Agila Entertainment (2026-present)
- Height: 1.85 m (6 ft 1 in)
Association football career
- Position: Midfielder
Senior career*
Years	Team	Apps	(Gls)
2011–2012	Team Socceroo		
2012–2013	Pachanga Diliman		
2013	Stallion Sta. Lucia	6	(1)
2014	Kaya	1	(0)
2013–2015	Team Socceroo		
2020	Maharlika	0	(0)
- * Club domestic league appearances and goals

Daniel Kenji "Dandan" Silva Matsunaga (born November 28, 1988) is a Brazilian former model, actor, professional footballer, host and businessman. He became known in the Philippines by appearing in Cosmopolitan Philippines’ September 2009 "Cosmo Men" supplement. He was scouted in the Philippines as an actor and was first given TV drama projects on GMA Network. He also joined ABS-CBN's reality TV show Pinoy Big Brother and was declared as the PBB All-In big winner in 2014.

As a footballer he has played for Team Socceroo, Pachanga and Kaya in the United Football League (UFL) which was the top-flight football league in the Philippines during its existence.

== Early life ==
Matsunaga was born in Brasília, the capital of Brazil. His mother, Gerarda Silva, is a Brazilian of Portuguese, African, and Indigenous descent, while his father, Paulo Mitsuo Matsunaga, is of Japanese descent. He has a brother and a sister.

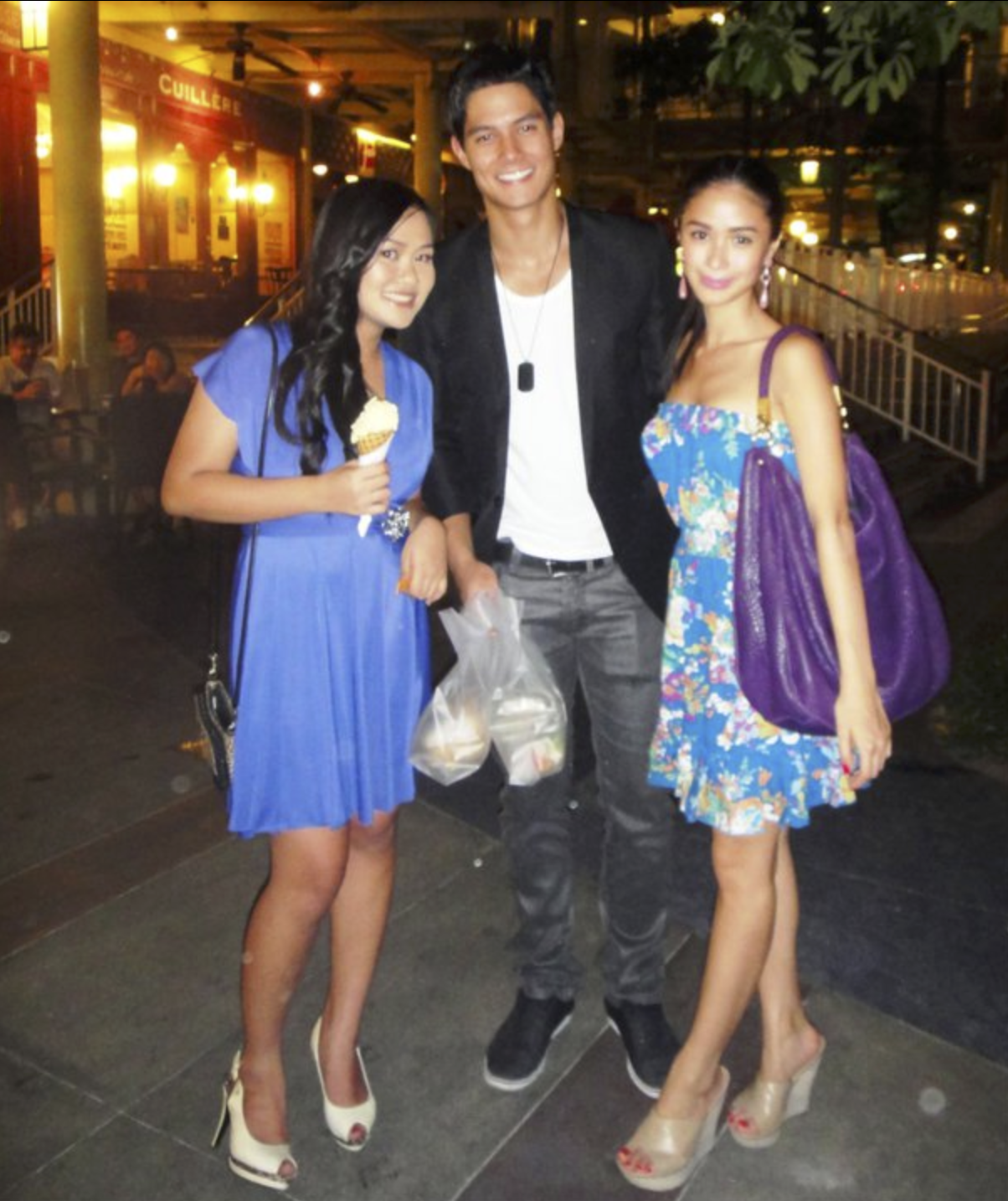
Matsunaga with Heart Evangelista and Jonha Richman

== Career ==
=== Modelling and acting ===
Matsunaga started his career when he became a model for Cosmopolitan Philippines 'Cosmo Men' supplement. His debut series on screen was on GMA-7's top rated drama series The Last Prince with co-stars Aljur Abrenica and Kris Bernal.

In 2012, he moved to TV5 for more TV shows and projects like Game N Go, Enchanted and Misibis Bay.

He went to ABS-CBN to be one of the celebrity judges for It's Showtime. On 17 May 2014, Matsunaga entered the Pinoy Big Brother house on Day 21 as the fourth celebrity and eighteenth official housemate of the Pinoy Big Brother: All In season.

On 24 August 2014, he was declared as the big winner of Pinoy Big Brother: All In.

In May 2017, Matsunaga was introduced as the first male endorser for Avon Philippines' Men's Club during the "Confidence is the New Sexy" campaign launch. He was chosen to be the endorser because he "reflects the Modern Gentleman who is a man of style, adventure, and confidence".

== Football career ==
Matsunaga started playing football during his childhood and aspired to play for the Brazil national football team before he got involved in showbiz. He played for clubs in his native Brazil as well as in Hong Kong before playing in the Philippines. In the Philippines he had played for Team Socceroo, Pachanga, and Kaya.

He played in the now defunct United Football League (UFL) starting in Division 2 playing for Team Socceroo in 2011 playing with fellow model actor Fabio Ide. He then moved to Division 1 club Pachanga Diliman during the 2012 UFL Cup, before eventually moving to Stallion for the 2013 season. For the 2014 season he moved to Kaya.

In street football, he played for Team Naxional who secured qualification as the Philippine representatives at the Neymar Jr's Five Football Tournament by winning over Tondo in the final of the Philippine qualifying leg. The world final held in Brazil was contested by 53 other countries with Romania emerging as champions.

Matsunaga also became involved in the 7's Football League as a player.

He returned to domestic football, when he signed to play with Philippines Football League newcomer Maharlika F.C. in August 2020, although he was not part of the final lineup for the 2020 season for undisclosed reasons.

== Personal life ==
Matsunaga is a Christian. He obtained permanent residency in the Philippines in December 2014 and had expressed intention to petition for Filipino citizenship.

== Filmography ==
=== Film ===
Year	Title	Role	Studio
2012	Sisterakas	Marlon	Star Cinema
2013	The Bride and the Lover	Sheila's husband	Regal Films
2013	She's the One	Jason	Star Cinema
2014	Endless	Daniel	ABS-CBN (Pinoy Big Brother: All In)
2014	Past Tense	Carlos Santillan	Star Cinema
2014	Shake, Rattle & Roll XV	Bryan	Regal Films
2017	Spirit of the Glass 2: The Haunted	Enzo	OctoArts Films, T-Rex Entertainment Productions
2017	Fallback	Chris	Cineko
2017	Meant to Beh	Benjo Marasigan	OctoArts Films, M-Zet Productions, APT Entertainment
2018	Kahit Ayaw Mo Na	Reggie	BluArt Productions, Viva Films
2024	Love in Disguise	Alex	Impact Creation Films

=== Television ===
Year	Title	Role	Network
2010	The Last Prince	Prince Nicolai	GMA Network
2010	Langit sa Piling Mo	Xavier Cruz	GMA Network
2010	Love Bug Presents: Wish Come True	Raoul Del Rosario	GMA Network
2010–2011	Grazilda	Kasmir	GMA Network
2011	Machete	Baal	GMA Network
2011	Spooky Nights: Snow White and the Seven Ghosts	Prince	GMA Network
2011	Futbolilits	Raphael Yamamoto	GMA Network
2012–2013	Game 'N Go	Host	TV5
2012	Third Eye	Lucas	TV5
2012–2013	Enchanted Garden	Mark Morgan	TV5
2013	Kris TV	Recurring guest co-host	ABS-CBN
2013	Toda Max	Victor	ABS-CBN
2013	Cassandra: Warrior Angel	Lucas	TV5
2013	Misibis Bay	Andrew Cadiz	TV5
2014	It's Showtime	Celebrity Judge	ABS-CBN
2014	The Replacement Bride	Kael	TV5
2014	Pinoy Big Brother: All In	Housemate (Big Winner)	ABS-CBN
2015	Two Wives	Kenjie Celdran	ABS-CBN
2015	Ipaglaban Mo: Nakaw Na Sandali	Peter	ABS-CBN
2015	R U Tough Enough: Philippines	Host/Ambassador	KIX
2016	Be My Lady	Philip Oliviera	ABS-CBN
2016–2021	ASAP	Himself / Performer	ABS-CBN
2017	I Can Do That	Contestant	ABS-CBN
2017	A Love to Last	Patrick Buendia	ABS-CBN
2018	Discover the Philippines	Host	Discovery Channel / TLC
2018–2019	Halik	Yohan Tanaka	ABS-CBN
2020–2021	Sunday 'Kada	Himself / Various characters	TV5

Preceded by Myrtle Sarrosa	Pinoy Big Brother; Big Winner; 2014	Succeeded by (Japan) Miho Nishida and Jimboy Martin
Preceded by Ruben Gonzaga	Pinoy Big Brother; Celebrity Big Winner; 2014	Succeeded by Anji Salvacion
