= List of Pinoy Big Brother housemates =

Pinoy Big Brother is a Philippine reality game show based on the Dutch reality game show, Big Brother. The show revolves around a group of housemates (contestants) who volunteer to reside in the Pinoy Big Brother house for a set number of days as they compete against each other to be the Big Winner.

Contestants are selected through live site and online auditions, with individuals of foreign origin being eligible to compete in the show. Age requirements were implemented in all seasons. For Connect and Kumunity Season 10, which were held amid the COVID-19 pandemic, all auditions were conducted online, with the age requirement being raised to 16 in compliance with quarantine protocols.

While most housemates leave the house via public vote, some had exited the house by their own will in an action known as a "Voluntary Exit". In addition, a housemate can be removed from the game via a "Forced Eviction" as a result of rule violations or medical emergencies. In several occasions, evicted housemates are given a chance to return to the house via public voting or wildcard competitions.

Since its inaugural season in 2005, the show has featured 412 housemates (separately counting two housemates who played as one) in three different editions; 196 regulars, 60 celebrities and 156 teens. Teen Edition Plus saw 14 guardians competing in a separate competition alongside the main teen edition. Otso had Star Dreamers compete for a chance to enter the house as a housemate to replace the weekly evictee wherein a total of 13 star dreamers failed to do so.

A total of 22 winners have been crowned with three seasons crowning two. Caprice Cayetano & Lella Ford of Pinoy Big Brother: Celebrity Collab Edition 2.0 are the most recent winners. 95 housemates became finalists and there have been 271 evictions, 23 voluntary exits and 26 forced evictions.

== Housemates ==
Legend
Regular Edition	Winner
Celebrity Edition
Teen Edition
Mixed Edition
Italics denote a full season-equivalent chapter within a season

=== 2005–2010 ===
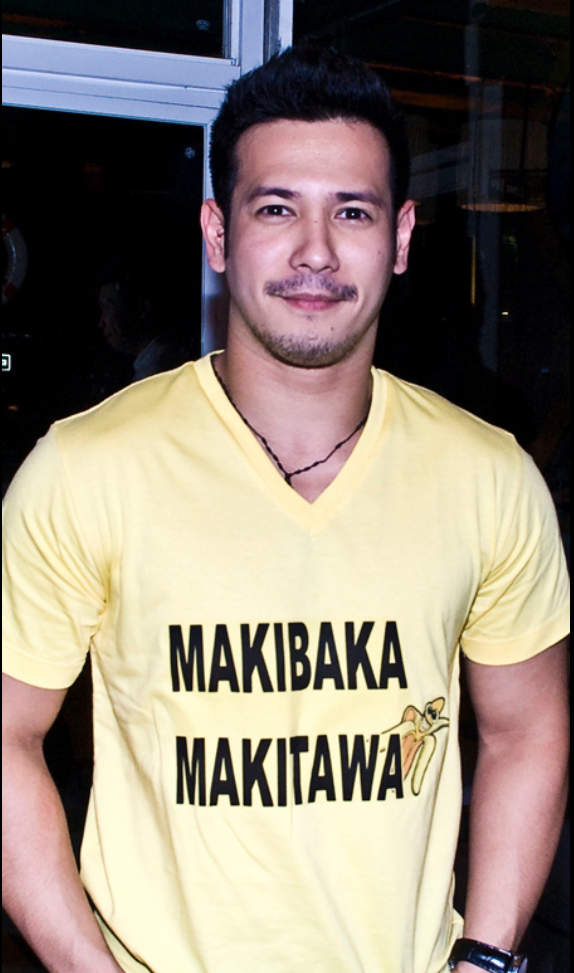
John Prats, Celebrity Edition 1 housemate

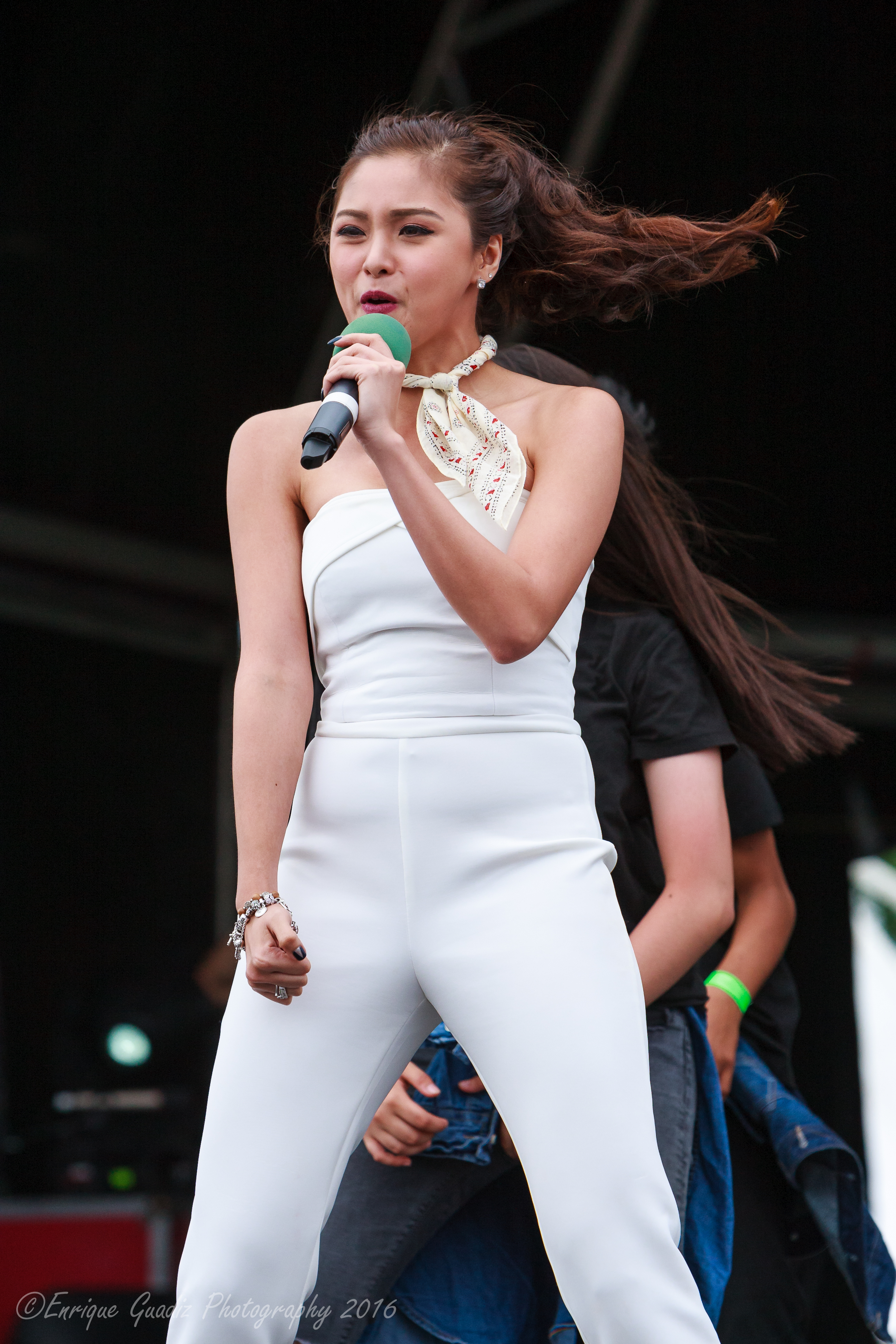
Kim Chiu, Teen 1 Winner

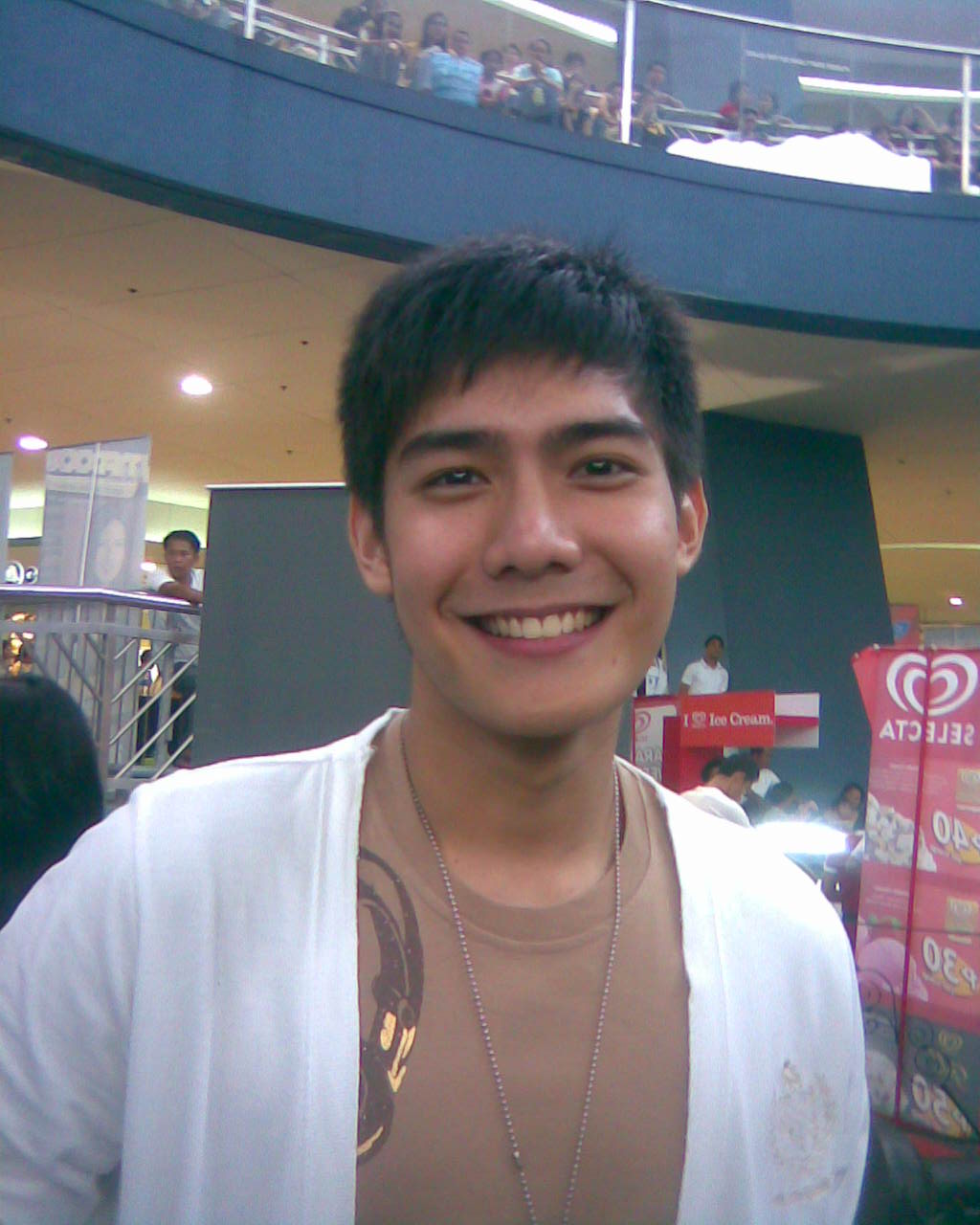
Robi Domingo, Teen Plus Housemate

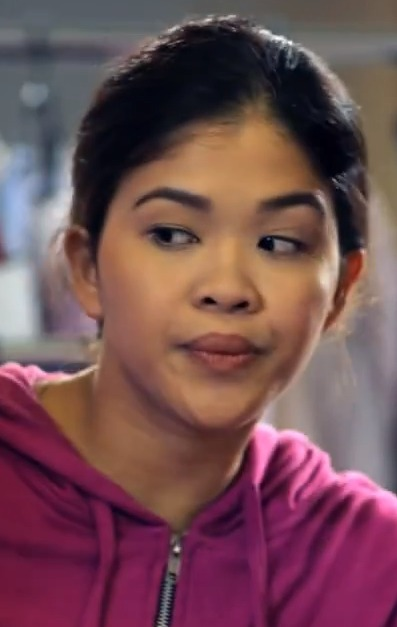
Melai Cantiveros, Double Up Winner

Season	Name	Hometown	Age on Entry	Day entered	Day exited	Days spent in house	Result	Refs
PBB1	Nene Tamayo	Romblon	23	Day 1	Day 112	112	Winner	
PBB1	Jayson Gainza	Batangas City	25	Day 1	Day 112	112	Runner-up	
PBB1	Cassandra Ponti	Davao City	25	Day 1	Day 112	112	Finalist	
PBB1	Uma Khouny	San Juan, Metro Manila	23	Day 1	Day 112	112	Finalist	
PBB1	Say Alonzo	San Juan, Metro Manila	22	Day 1	Day 112	105	Evicted	
PBB1	Franzen Fajardo	Sampaloc, Manila	23	Day 1	Day 91	91	Forcibly Evicted	
PBB1	Jenny Suico	Olongapo City	29	Day 56 Day 1	Day 84 Day 28	57	Evicted Voluntarily Exited	
PBB1	Sam Milby	Troy, Ohio, United States	21	Day 28	Day 77	50	Evicted	
PBB1	Chx Alcala	Caloocan	24	Day 1	Day 63	63	Evicted	
PBB1	Bob dela Cruz	Marilao, Bulacan	28	Day 1	Day 50	50	Forcibly Evicted	
PBB1	Racquel Reyes	Tanauan City	31	Day 1	Day 49	49	Evicted	
PBB1	JB Magsaysay	La Union	25	Day 1	Day 35	35	Evicted	
PBB1	Rico Barrera	Olongapo City	23	Day 1	Day 21	21	Evicted	
CE1	Keanna Reeves	Not Disclosed	36	Day 1	Day 56	56	Winner	
CE1	John Prats	Not Disclosed	21	Day 1	Day 56	56	Runner-up	
CE1	Bianca Gonzalez	Not Disclosed	22	Day 1	Day 56	56	Finalist	
CE1	Zanjoe Marudo	Not Disclosed	23	Day 1	Day 56	56	Finalist	
CE1	Budoy Marabiles	Not Disclosed	33	Day 1	Day 49	49	Evicted	
CE1	Rustom Padilla	Not Disclosed	38	Day 1	Day 46	46	Voluntarily Exited	
CE1	Rico Robles	Not Disclosed	25	Day 1	Day 42	42	Evicted	
CE1	Roxanne Barcelo	Not Disclosed	21	Day 1	Day 41	41	Voluntarily Exited	
CE1	Gretchen Malalad	Not Disclosed	26	Day 1	Day 39	39	Evicted	
CE1	Aleck Bovick	Not Disclosed	21	Day 1	Day 35	35	Evicted	
CE1	Christian Vasquez	Not Disclosed	28	Day 1	Day 28	28	Evicted	
CE1	Rudy Fernandez	Not Disclosed	58	Day 1	Day 21	21	Evicted	
CE1	Mich Dulce	Not Disclosed	24	Day 1	Day 21	21	Forcibly Evicted	
CE1	Angela Calina	Not Disclosed	30	Day 1	Day 12	12	Voluntarily Exited	
TE1	Kim Chiu	Cebu City	16	Day 1	Day 42	42	Winner	
TE1	Mikee Lee	Quezon City	16	Day 1	Day 42	42	Runner-up	
TE1	Gerald Anderson	General Santos	17	Day 1	Day 42	42	Finalist	
TE1	Clare Cabiguin	Malaybalay City, Bukidnon	18	Day 1	Day 42	42	Finalist	
TE1	Jamilla Obispo	Laguna	18	Day 1	Day 35	35	Evicted	
TE1	Brenda Fox	Olongapo City	16	Day 1	Day 21	21	Evicted	
TE1	Matt Evans	Quezon City	17	Day 1	Day 28	28	Evicted	
TE1	Olyn Membian	Quezon City	16	Day 1	Day 28	28	Evicted	
TE1	Fred Payawan	Parañaque	17	Day 1	Day 21	21	Evicted	
TE1	Joaqui Mendoza	Parañaque	17	Day 1	Day 13	13	Evicted	
TE1	Niña Jose	Makati	17	Day 1	Day 14	14	Evicted	
TE1	Bam Romana	Parañaque	16	Day 1	Day 14	14	Forcibly Evicted	
TE1	Mikki Arceo	Davao City	18	Day 1	Day 11	11	Evicted	
TE1	Aldred Gatchalian	Pasay	15	Day 1	Day 7	7	Voluntarily Exited	
PBB2	Beatriz Saw	Baao, Camarines Sur	21	Day 8	Day 126	119	Winner	
PBB2	Mickey Perz	Switzerland	23	Day 1	Day 126	126	Runner-up	
PBB2	Wendy Valdez	Navotas	25	Day 78 Day 1	Day 126 Day 70	119	Finalist Evicted	
PBB2	Gee-Ann Abrahan	Quezon City	21	Day 1	Day 126	126	Finalist	
PBB2	Bodie Cruz	Las Piñas	21	Day 14	Day 124	105	Evicted	
PBB2	Bruce Quebral	Cainta, Rizal	25	Day 11	Day 122	112	Evicted	
PBB2	Nel Rapiz	Iloilo City	25	Day 1	Day 119	119	Evicted	
PBB2	Robert Woods	Birmingham, United Kingdom	24	Day 7	Day 112	106	Evicted	
PBB2	Saicy Aguila	Bacolod	23	Day 1	Day 105	105	Evicted	
PBB2	Kian Kazemi	Makati	21	Day 78 Day 9	Day 98 Day 49	62	Evicted Evicted	
PBB2	Yen Galagnara	Quezon City	35	Day 70	Day 91	22	Evicted	
PBB2	Dionne Monsanto	Cebu City	21	Day 12	Day 77	66	Evicted	
PBB2	Geraldine Javier	Quezon City	32	Day 70	Day 77	7	Evicted	
PBB2	Maricris Dizon	Italy	27	Day 14	Day 65	52	Forcibly Evicted	
PBB2	Ezekiel Dimaguila	Australia	21	Day 78 Day 1	Day 85 Day 35	43	Evicted Evicted	
PBB2	Jasmin Engracia	Davao City	22	Day 78 Day 10	Day 86 Day 29	29	Evicted Evicted	
PBB2	Jeremy Legazpi	Japan	20	Day 14	Day 21	7	Evicted	
PBB2	Mikah Dizon	Baguio	20	Day 14	Day 21	7	Evicted	
CE2	Ruben Gonzaga	Not Disclosed	25	Day 1	Day 84	84	Winner	
CE2	Riza Santos	Not Disclosed	21	Day 1	Day 84	84	Runner-up	
CE2	Gaby Dela Merced	Not Disclosed	25	Day 44 Day 2	Day 84 Day 28	68	Finalist Voluntarily Exited	
CE2	Will Devaughn	Not Disclosed	25	Day 1	Day 84	84	Finalist	
CE2	Jon Avila	Not Disclosed	22	Day 4	Day 81	78	Forcibly Evicted	
CE2	Baron Geisler	Not Disclosed	25	Day 1	Day 75	75	Forcibly Evicted	
CE2	Yayo Aguila	Not Disclosed	40	Day 70 Day 1	Day 71 Day 66	68	Finalist Voluntarily Exited	
CE2	Gladys Guevarra	Not Disclosed	30	Day 46	Day 58	13	Voluntarily Exited	
CE2	Donald Geisler	Not Disclosed	28	Day 1	Day 56	56	Evicted	
CE2	Victor Basa	Not Disclosed	22	Day 1	Day 49	49	Evicted	
CE2	Ethel Booba	Not Disclosed	30	Day 4	Day 40	37	Voluntarily Exited	
CE2	Mcoy Fundales	Not Disclosed	29	Day 3	Day 40	38	Voluntarily Exited	
CE2	Megan Young	Not Disclosed	17	Day 1	Day 35	35	Evicted	
CE2	Zara Aldana	Not Disclosed	18	Day 1	Day 19	19	Evicted	
CE2	Jen Da Silva and Marylaine Viernes	Not Disclosed	17, 21	Day 1	Day 14	14	Evicted	
Plus	Ejay Falcon	Pola, Oriental Mindoro	17	Day 1	Day 77	77	Winner	
Plus	Robi Domingo	Quezon City	18	Day 1	Day 77	77	Runner-up	
Plus	Nicole Uysiuseng	Cebu	17	Day 1	Day 77	77	Finalist	
Plus	Beauty Gonzalez	Dumaguete	16	Day 1	Day 77	77	Finalist	
Plus	Alex Anselmuccio	Milan, Italy	18	Day 1	Day 74	74	Evicted	
Plus	Nan Clenuar	Davao	17	Day 1	Day 70	70	Evicted	
Plus	Valerie Weigmann	Wiesbaden, Germany	18	Day 1	Day 67	67	Evicted	
Plus	Rona Libby	Dumaguete	16	Day 1	Day 63	63	Evicted	
Plus	Priscilla Navidad	Davao	17	Day 1	Day 56	56	Evicted	
Plus	Josef Elizalde	Mandaluyong	16	Day 1	Day 49	49	Evicted	
Plus	Jolas Paguia	Guiguinto, Bulacan	18	Day 1	Day 42	42	Evicted	
Plus	Kevin Garcia-Flood	Madrid, Spain	18	Day 1	Day 35	35	Voluntarily Exited	
Plus	Linda Backlund	Iriga City	16	Day 1	Day 26	35	Voluntarily Exited	
Plus	Jieriel Papa	Davao	16	Day 1	Day 21	21	Evicted	
Double Up	Melisa Cantiveros	General Santos	21	Day 1	Day 133	133	Winner	
Double Up	Paul Jake Castillo	Cebu	24	Day 1	Day 133	133	Runner-up	
Double Up	Jason Francisco	Calapan, Oriental Mindoro	21	Day 1	Day 133	133	Finalist	
Double Up	Johan Santos	Quezon City	22	Day 7	Day 133	127	Finalist	
Double Up	Tibo Jumalon	Cagayan de Oro	33	Day 7	Day 133	127	Finalist	
Double Up	Mariel Sorino	Davao City	21	Day 1	Day 126	126	Evicted	
Double Up	Kath Lopeña-Ortega	Spain	24	Day 7	Day 119	113	Evicted	
Double Up	Hermes Bautista	Pampanga	23	Day 7	Day 112	106	Evicted	
Double Up	Cathy Remperas	Bohol	22	Day 7	Day 112	99	Evicted	
Double Up	Sam Pinto	Parañaque	19	Day 43	Day 98	56	Evicted	
Double Up	Rica Paras	Iloilo	26	Day 7	Day 91	85	Evicted	
Double Up	Patrick Villanueva	Baguio	32	Day 7	Day 84	78	Evicted	
Double Up	Carol Batay	Tondo, Manila	22	Day 1	Day 77	77	Evicted	
Double Up	Rocky Salumbides	Cavite	29	Day 43	Day 67	25	Voluntarily Exited	
Double Up	Yuri Okawa	Japan	25	Day 1	Day 64	64	Evicted	
Double Up	Rob Stumvoll	Austria	24	Day 7	Day 56	50	Evicted	
Double Up	Riza Mae Patria	Siquijor	23	Day 7	Day 49	43	Evicted	
Double Up	Tom Mott	Samar/Arizona, United States	22	Day 1	Day 42	42	Forcibly Evicted	
Double Up	Delio Dimaculangan	Batangas	26	Day 1	Day 35	35	Evicted	
Double Up	Yhel Punzalan	Angeles City	26	Day 1	Day 26	26	Forcibly Evicted	
Double Up	Princess Manzon	Cebu/Fukuoka, Japan	22	Day 1	Day 22	22	Voluntarily Exited	
Double Up	Jimson Ortega	Spain	25	Day 7	Day 21	15	Evicted	
Double Up	JM Lagumbay	Quezon City	29	Day 1	Day 5	5	Forcibly Evicted	
Double Up	Toffi Santos	Rizal	20	Day 1	Day 5	5	Forcibly Evicted	
Double Up	Kenny Santos	Rizal	20	Day 1	Day 5	5	Forcibly Evicted	
Double Up	JP Lagumbay	Quezon City	29	Day 1	Day 3	3	Voluntarily Exited	

=== 2010–2019 ===
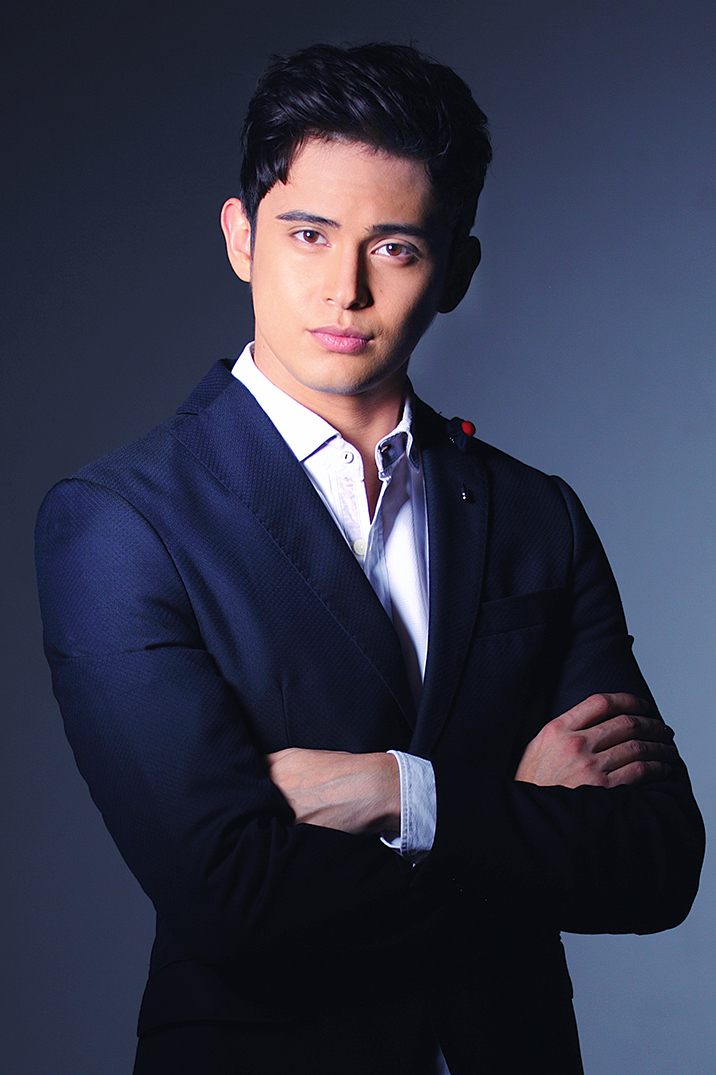
James Reid, Teen Clash 2010 winner

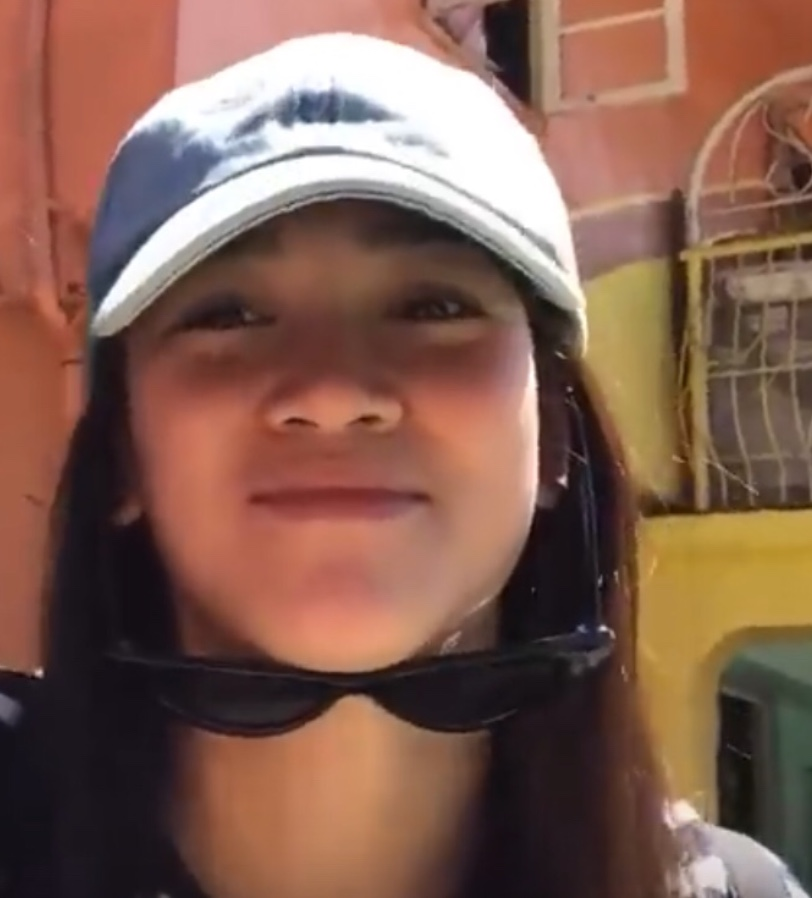
Pamu Pamorada, Unlimited housemate

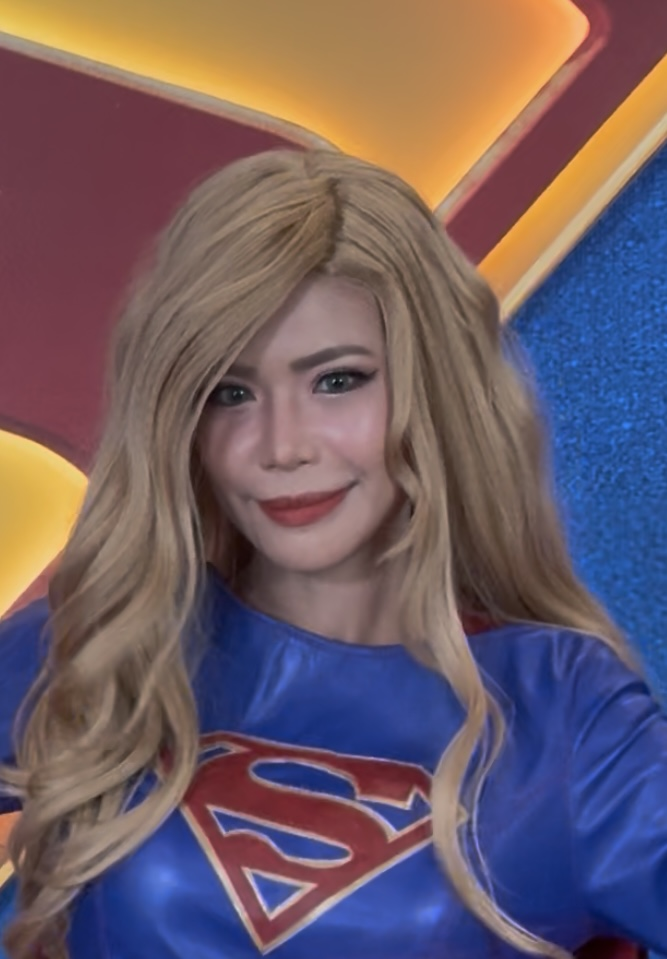
Myrtle Sarrosa, Teen Edition 4 winner

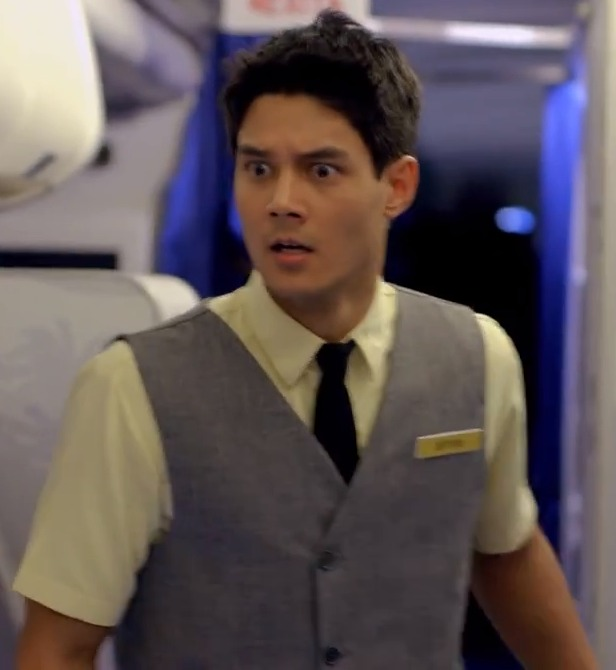
Daniel Matsunaga, All In winner

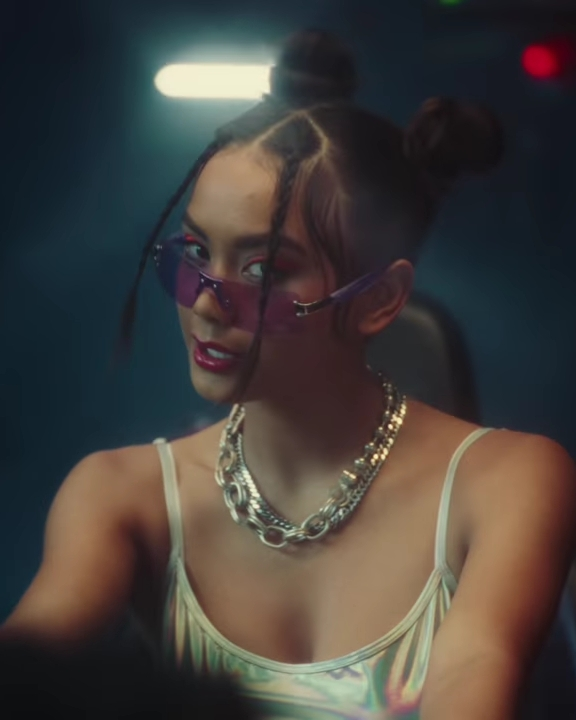
Ylona Garcia, 737 housemate

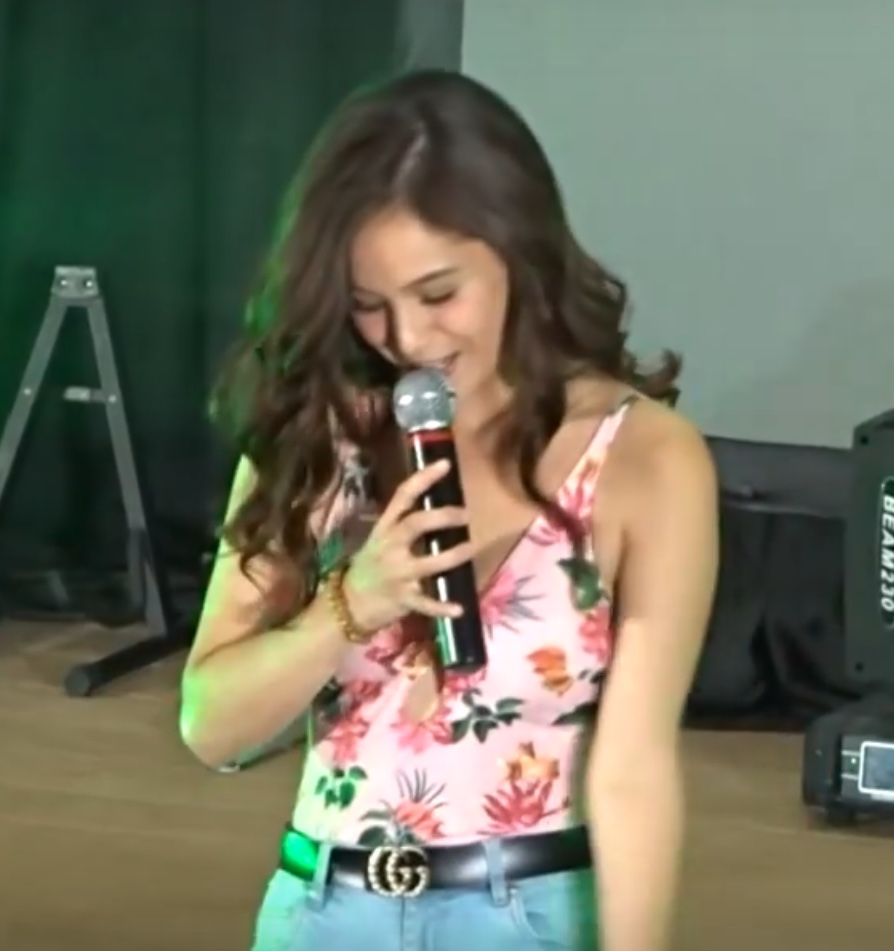
Barbie Imperial, 737 housemate

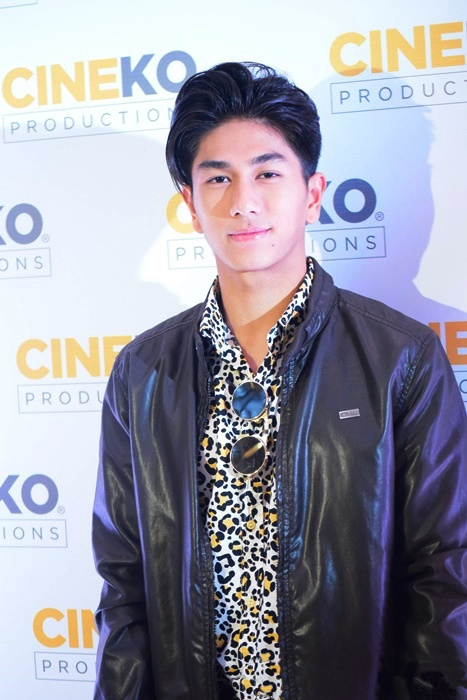
Nikko Natividad, Lucky Season 7 housemate

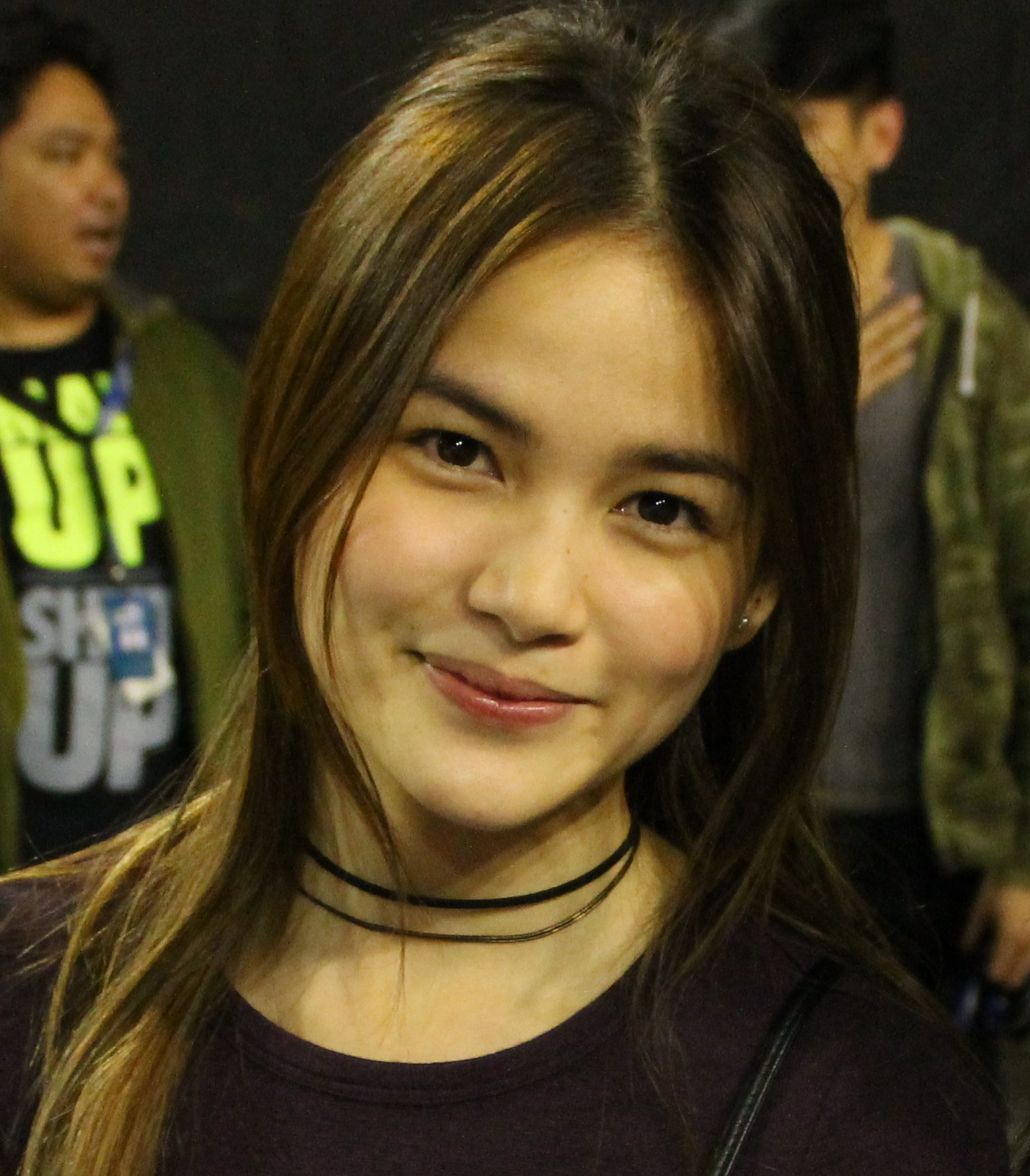
Elisse Joson, Lucky Season 7 housemate

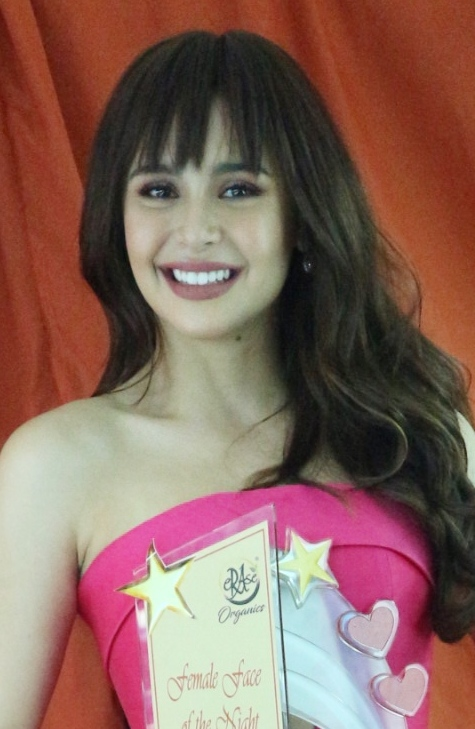
Yassi Pressman, Lucky Season 7 housemate

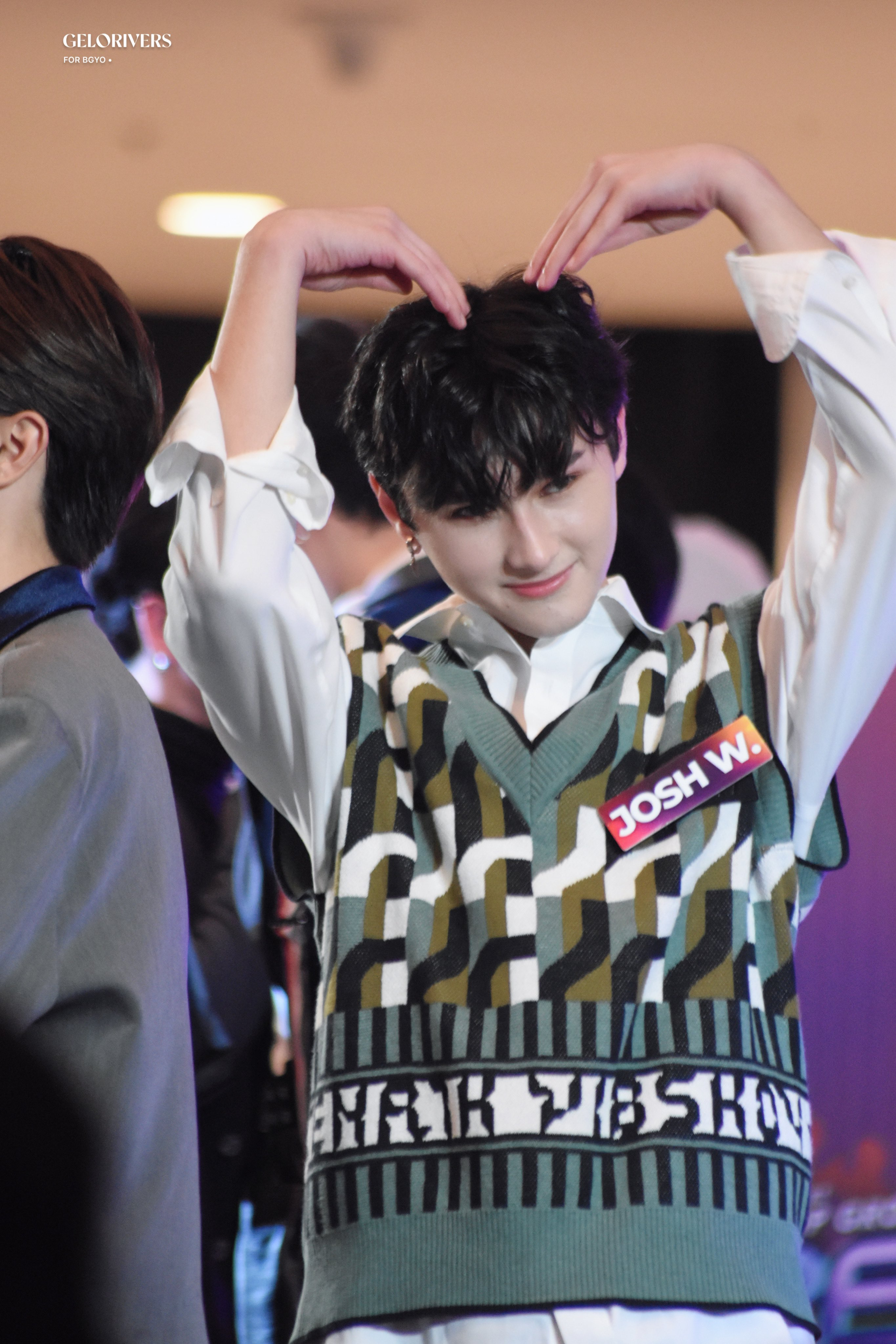
Josh Worsley, Otso housemate

Season	Name	Hometown	Age on Entry	Day entered	Day exited	Days spent in house	Result	Refs
Clash 2010	James Reid	Australia	16	Day 22	Day 78	57	Winner	
Clash 2010	Ryan Bang (Bang Hyung-sun)	South Korea	17	Day 22	Day 78	57	Runner-up	
Clash 2010	Fretzie Bercede	Cebu	16	Day 1	Day 78	78	Finalist	
Clash 2010	Devon Seron	Cebu	16	Day 1	Day 78	78	Finalist	
Clash 2010	Ivan Dorschner	Rizal	19	Day 1	Day 78	78	Finalist	
Clash 2010	Bret Jackson	United States	19	Day 22	Day 78	57	Finalist	
Clash 2010	Ann Li (Yi Shuan Li)	Taiwan	15	Day 22	Day 75	54	Evicted	
Clash 2010	Jenny Kim (Kim Jin-sol)	South Korea	16	Day 22	Day 71	50	Forcibly Evicted	
Clash 2010	Tricia Santos	Davao City	14	Day 1	Day 63	63	Evicted	
Clash 2010	Angelo Pasco	Antique	18	Day 1	Day 54	54	Forcibly Evicted	
Clash 2010	Patrick Sugui	Mandaluyong	16	Day 1	Day 50	50	Evicted	
Clash 2010	Joe Vargas	Quezon City	17	Day 1	Day 50	50	Evicted	
Clash 2010	Sophia Ko (Ko So-young)	South Korea	14	Day 22	Day 50	29	Evicted	
Clash 2010	Jack Yoon (Yoon Sung-bin)	South Korea	19	Day 22	Day 50	29	Evicted	
Clash 2010	Yen Santos	Cabanatuan, Nueva Ecija	17	Day 1	Day 43	43	Evicted	
Clash 2010	Kazel Kinouchi	Parañaque	18	Day 1	Day 43	43	Evicted	
Clash 2010	Richard Na (Na Do-hun)	South Korea	17	Day 22	Day 43	22	Evicted	
Clash 2010	Carson Vince	Canada	17	Day 22	Day 43	22	Evicted	
Clash 2010	Marrion Gopez	Porac, Pampanga	17	Day 1	Day 36	36	Evicted	
Clash 2010	Jovic Susim	Albay	17	Day 20	Day 36	17	Evicted	
Clash 2010	April Sun	Hong Kong	18	Day 22	Day 36	15	Evicted	
Clash 2010	Kyra Custodio	Batangas	15	Day 1	Day 29	29	Evicted	
Clash 2010	Shey Bustamante	Mindoro	17	Day 1	Day 24	24	Forcibly Evicted	
Clash 2010	Rebecca Chiongbian	Cebu	16	Day 1	Day 22	22	Evicted	
Clash 2010	Eslove Briones	Tawi-Tawi	17	Day 1	Day 19	19	Forcibly Evicted	
Clash 2010	Potz Jalosjos	Dipolog	19	Day 1	Day 15	15	Evicted	
Clash 2010	Maichel Fideles	Samar	19	Day 2	Day 15	14	Forcibly Evicted	
Unlimited	Slater Young	Cebu City	24	Day 1	Day 155	155	Winner	
Unlimited	Pamu Pamorada	Lipa City, Batangas	19	Day 1	Day 155	155	Runner-up	
Unlimited	Joseph Biggel	Marinduque	19	Day 1	Day 155	155	Finalist	
Unlimited	Paco Evangelista	General Santos	26	Day 1	Day 155	155	Finalist	
Unlimited	Divine Maitland-Smith	Cebu City	20	Day 1	Day 152	152	Evicted	
Unlimited	Tin Patrimonio	Cainta, Rizal	19	Day 1	Day 148	148	Evicted	
Unlimited	Carlo Romero	Chicago, United States	25	Day 1	Day 141	141	Evicted	
Unlimited	Kevin Fowler	California, United States	18	Day 1	Day 134	134	Evicted	
Unlimited	Seichang Ushimi	Tokyo, Japan	22	Day 1	Day 127	127	Evicted	
Unlimited	Deniesse Joaquin	Sampaloc, Manila	22	Day 15	Day 120	106	Forcibly Evicted	
Unlimited	Eting Busarang	Cebu	27	Day 8	Day 113	106	Evicted	
Unlimited	Wendy Tabusalla	Muntinlupa	22	Day 8	Day 99	92	Evicted	
Unlimited	Jessica Connelly	Taguig	19	Day 8	Day 93	86	Forcibly Evicted	
Unlimited	Joya Genzola	Negros Occidental	24	Day 8	Day 92	85	Evicted	
Unlimited	Naprey Almario	Davao	23	Day 8	Day 78	71	Evicted	
Unlimited	Unad Hernandez	Batangas	24	Day 8	Day 78	71	Evicted	
Unlimited	Roy Gamboa	Pangasinan	29	Day 1	Day 78	78	Evicted	
Unlimited	Ryan Tomas	Colorado, United States	19	Day 23	Day 78	56	Evicted	
Unlimited	Jerico Redrico	Pampanga	24	Day 8	Day 78	71	Evicted	
Unlimited	Steph Enage	Leyte	23	Day 8	Day 78	71	Evicted	
Unlimited	Kim de Guzman	Olongapo City	19	Day 1	Day 71	71	Forcibly Evicted	
Unlimited	Kigoy Abarico	Ormoc, Leyte	32	Day 1	Day 71	71	Evicted	
Unlimited	Anatoly Chua	Surigao	33	Day 8	Day 71	64	Evicted	
Unlimited	Luz McClinton	Muntinlupa	33	Day 1	Day 71	71	Evicted	
Unlimited	Seth Cox	California, United States	32	Day 25	Day 50	26	Evicted	
Unlimited	Erica Arlante	Bacolod	31	Day 8	Day 50	43	Evicted	
Unlimited	Mark Luz	Quezon City	23	Day 8	Day 43	36	Forcibly Evicted	
Unlimited	Lyn Elimanco	Surigao	25	Day 8	Day 43	36	Voluntarily Exited	
Unlimited	Casey Austria	Legazpi, Albay	19	Day 8	Day 36	29	Evicted	
Unlimited	Reg Pineda	Quezon City	19	Day 15	Day 36	22	Forcibly Evicted	
Unlimited	Jaz Manabat	Quezon City	24	Day 1	Day 31	31	Voluntarily Exited	
Unlimited	Diane Aquino	Quezon City	28	Day 8	Day 29	22	Evicted	
Unlimited	Lordwin Claveria	Quezon	23	Day 8	Day 29	22	Evicted	
Unlimited	Cindy Miranda	Nueva Ecija	21	Day 15	Day 22	8	Evicted	
Unlimited	Rhea Lim	Pampanga	26	Day 15	Day 22	8	Evicted	
Unlimited	RJ Padilla	Parañaque	22	Day 15	Day 21	7	Forcibly Evicted	
Unlimited	Kulas Alon	La Union	26	Day 15	Day 20	6	Evicted	
TE4	Myrtle Sarrosa	Iloilo City	17	Day 2	Day 91	90	Winner	
TE4	Karen Reyes	Calapan, Oriental Mindoro	15	Day 2	Day 91	90	Runner-up	
TE4	Roy Requejo	Naga City	17	Day 1	Day 91	91	Finalist	
TE4	Jai & Joj Agpangan	Bacolod	16	Day 1	Day 91	91	Finalist	
TE4	Ryan Boyce	Angeles, Pampanga	15	Day 1	Day 86	86	Evicted	
TE4	Alec Dungo	Santa Cruz, Laguna	17	Day 1	Day 83	83	Evicted	
TE4	Yves Flores	Tarlac	17	Day 1	Day 76	76	Evicted	
TE4	Tom Doromal	Davao City	15	Day 1	Day 70	70	Evicted	
TE4	Mariz Rañeses	Cebu City	16	Day 2	Day 56	55	Evicted	
TE4	Kit Thompson	Angeles, Pampanga	15	Day 1	Day 49	49	Evicted	
TE4	Clodet Loreto	Davao	13	Day 2	Day 42	41	Evicted	
TE4	Claire Bercero	Makati	15	Day 2	Day 35	34	Evicted	
TE4	Nikka Javier	Lian, Batangas	15	Day 2	Day 28	27	Evicted	
TE4	Vincent Manlapaz	Cainta, Rizal	15	Day 1	Day 21	21	Evicted	
All In	Daniel Matsunaga	Makati	25	Day 21	Day 120	100	Winner	
All In	Maris Racal	Tagum, Davao del Norte	16	Day 1	Day 120	120	Runner-up	
All In	Jane Oineza	Quezon City	18	Day 1	Day 120	120	Finalist	
All In	Vickie Rushton	Bacolod	21	Day 1	Day 120	120	Finalist	
All In	Loisa Andalio	Parañaque	15	Day 1	Day 119	119	Evicted	
All In	Joshua Garcia	Batangas	16	Day 1	Day 113	113	Evicted	
All In	Manolo Pedrosa	Quezon City	18	Day 1	Day 106	106	Evicted	
All In	Fifth Pagotan	Pasay	23	Day 1	Day 98	98	Evicted	
All In	Fourth Pagotan	Pasay	23	Day 1	Day 85	85	Evicted	
All In	Cheridel Alejandrino	Olongapo City	26	Day 49	Day 78	30	Evicted	
All In	Nichole Baranda	Makati	15	Day 1	Day 64	64	Evicted	
All In	Michele Gumabao	Quezon City	21	Day 1	Day 57	57	Evicted	
All In	Jayme Jalandoni	Las Piñas	23	Day 1	Day 57	57	Evicted	
All In	Ranty Portento	Candelaria, Quezon	26	Day 1	Day 56	56	Evicted	
All In	Aina Solano	Boracay, Aklan	21	Day 1	Day 42	42	Evicted	
All In	Jacob Benedicto	Parañaque	21	Day 1	Day 35	35	Evicted	
All In	Axel Torres	Taguig	19	Day 1	Day 28	28	Evicted	
All In	Cess Visitacion	Valenzuela	23	Day 1	Day 21	21	Forcibly Evicted	
All In	Chevin Cecilio	Camarines Sur	22	Day 1	Day 21	21	Evicted	
737	Miho Nishida	Japan	22	Day 51	Day 142	92	Winner	
737	Jimboy Martin	Nueva Vizcaya	17	Day 1 Day 99	Day 50 Day 142	60	Winner	
737	Tommy Esguerra	Las Piñas	21	Day 77	Day 142	66	Runner-up	
737	Ylona Garcia	Australia	13	Day 2 Day 99	Day 50 Day 142	59	Runner-up	
737	Roger Lucero	Bacolod	28	Day 50	Day 141	92	Finalist	
737	Franco Rodriguez	Albay	16	Day 2 Day 99	Day 50 Day 141	58	Finalist	
737	Dawn Chang	Parañaque	26	Day 50	Day 141	92	Finalist	
737	Bailey May	London, United Kingdom	12	Day 1 Day 84	Day 47 Day 86	59	Finalist	
737	Zeus Collins	Rizal	21	Day 80	Day 133	54	Evicted	
737	Richard Juan	Parañaque	23	Day 51	Day 119	69	Evicted	
737	Jameson Blake	Pampanga	18	Day 81	Day 112	32	Evicted	
737	Mikee Agustin	Bulacan	21	Day 84	Day 105	52	Evicted	
737	Mikee Agustin	Bulacan	21	Day 50	Day 79	52	Evicted	
737	Margo Midwinter	Manila	23	Day 50	Day 98	49	Evicted	
737	Kamille Filoteo	Manila	18	Day 84	Day 86	50	Evicted	
737	Kamille Filoteo	Manila	18	Day 1	Day 47	50	Evicted	
737	Charlhone Petro	Pampanga	22	Day 50	Day 79	30	Evicted	
737	Krizia Lusuegro	Iloilo	24	Day 51	Day 79	29	Evicted	
737	Philip Lampart	Australia	21	Day 51	Day 77	27	Evicted	
737	Jyo Yokoyama	Japan	21	Day 50	Day 76	27	Voluntarily Exited	
737	James Linao	Surigao del Sur	30	Day 51	Day 70	20	Evicted	
737	Jessica Marasigan	California	21	Day 51	Day 58	8	Voluntarily Exited	
737	Kenzo Gutierrez	Quezon City	18	Day 1	Day 49	49	Evicted	
737	Zonia Mejia	Quezon City	13	Day 2	Day 42	41	Evicted	
737	Kyle Secades	San Juan	17	Day 2	Day 36	35	Voluntary Exited	
737	Ryan Bacalla	Cebu City	14	Day 1	Day 28	28	Evicted	
737	Ailah Antopina	Bacolod, Negros Occidental	13	Day 1	Day 21	21	Evicted	
737	Barbie Imperial	Legazpi, Albay	16	Day 1	Day 14	14	Evicted	
Lucky 7	Maymay Entrata	Cagayan de Oro	19	Day 23 Day 178	Day 129 Day 235	165	Winner	
Lucky 7	Kisses Delavin	Masbate City	17	Day 25 Day 178	Day 129 Day 235	163	Runner-up	
Lucky 7	Yong Muhajil	Zamboanga	16	Day 178	Day 235	162	Finalist	
Lucky 7	Yong Muhajil	Zamboanga	16	Day 24	Day 128	162	Evicted	
Lucky 7	Edward Barber	Germany	16	Day 24 Day 179	Day 129 Day 235	164	Finalist	
Lucky 7	Tanner Mata	Nueva Ecija	21	Day 108	Day 234	127	Finalist	
Lucky 7	McCoy de Leon and Nikko Natividad	Tondo, Manila and Bulacan	21, 23	Day 1 Day 178	Day 24 Day 234	81	Finalist	
Lucky 7	Cora Waddell	Bulacan	26	Day 179	Day 234	126	Finalist	
Lucky 7	Cora Waddell	Bulacan	26	Day 108	Day 177	126	Evicted	
Lucky 7	Elisse Joson	Mandaluyong	20	Day 178	Day 228	73	Evicted	
Lucky 7	Elisse Joson	Mandaluyong	20	Day 1	Day 23	73	Evicted	
Lucky 7	Jinri Park	South Korea	28	Day 2 Day 178	Day 24 Day 220	66	Evicted	
Lucky 7	Nonong Ballinan	Quezon City	29	Day 1 Day 178	Day 23 Day 213	59	Evicted	
Lucky 7	Jerome Alacre	Tondo, Manila	32	Day 108	Day 206	99	Evicted	
Lucky 7	Aura Azarcon	Las Piñas	24	Day 115	Day 199	85	Evicted	
Lucky 7	Baninay Bautista	Batangas	20	Day 179	Day 184	76	Evicted	
Lucky 7	Baninay Bautista	Batangas	20	Day 108	Day 177	76	Evicted	
Lucky 7	Christian Morones	Zamboanga	15	Day 179	Day 183	95	Evicted	
Lucky 7	Christian Morones	Zamboanga	15	Day 24	Day 112	95	Evicted	
Lucky 7	Yassi Pressman	Manila City	21	Day 180	Day 181	25	Voluntarily Exited	
Lucky 7	Yassi Pressman	Manila City	21	Day 1	Day 23	25	Evicted	
Lucky 7	Wil Dasovich	Pampanga	25	Day 115	Day 177	63	Evicted	
Lucky 7	Luis Hontiveros	Taguig	25	Day 108	Day 158	51	Evicted	
Lucky 7	Ali Forbes	Bulacan	24	Day 108	Day 148	41	Evicted	
Lucky 7	Jesi Corcuera	Cavite	25	Day 115	Day 148	34	Evicted	
Lucky 7	Thuy Nguyen	Tacloban	23	Day 108	Day 136	29	Evicted	
Lucky 7	Vivoree Esclito	Bohol	16	Day 25	Day 101	77	Evicted	
Lucky 7	Marco Gallo	Italy	15	Day 24	Day 95	72	Evicted	
Lucky 7	Kristine Hammond	Biñan, Laguna	16	Day 25	Day 80	56	Evicted	
Lucky 7	Heaven Peralejo	Makati	16	Day 25	Day 72	48	Voluntarily Exited	
Lucky 7	Fenech Veloso	Bohol	13	Day 25	Day 59	35	Evicted	
Lucky 7	Rita Gaviola	Lucena	13	Day 25	Day 52	28	Evicted	
Lucky 7	Aizan Perez	Batangas	14	Day 24	Day 45	22	Evicted	
Lucky 7	Juan Karlos Labajo	Cebu	15	Day 2	Day 23	22	Evicted	
Lucky 7	Hideo Muraoka	Taguig	28	Day 2	Day 23	22	Evicted	
Lucky 7	Chacha Balba	Tondo, Manila	28	Day 1	Day 11	11	Voluntarily Exited	
Otso	Yamyam Gucong	Bohol	25	Day 2	Day 29	28	Winner	
Otso	Kiara Takahashi	La Union	21	Day 1	Day 29	29	Runner-up	
Otso	Lou Yanong	Mandaluyong	21	Day 6	Day 29	24	Finalist	
Otso	Andre Brouillette	Hawaii, United States	21	Day 4	Day 29	26	Finalist	
Otso	Fumiya Sankai	Japan	23	Day 1	Day 28	28	Finalist	
Otso	Lie Reposposa	Tagum, Davao del Norte	15	Day 3	Day 28	26	Finalist	
Otso	Ashley del Mundo	Australia	15	Day 5	Day 28	24	Finalist	
Otso	Kaori Oinuma	Japan	18	Day 5	Day 28	17	Finalist	
Otso	Argel Saycon	Negros Oriental	20	Day 1	Day 21	21	Evicted	
Otso	Wealand Ferrer	Nueva Ecija	21	Day 1	Day 21	21	Evicted	
Otso	Akie Poblete	Rome, Italy	24	Day 1	Day 21	21	Evicted	
Otso	Jelay Pilones	General Santos	18	Day 6	Day 21	16	Evicted	
Otso	Karina Bautista	Isabela	17	Day 4	Day 21	18	Evicted	
Otso	Batit Espiritu	Nueva Ecija	19	Day 1	Day 21	21	Evicted	
Otso	Tan Roncal	Davao	14	Day 2	Day 21	20	Evicted	
Otso	Yen Quirante	Buhi, Camarines Sur	16	Day 3	Day 21	19	Evicted	
Otso	Kiara Takahashi	La Union	21	Day 2	Day 43	42	Winner	
Otso	Argel Saycon	Negros Oriental	20	Day 2	Day 43	42	Runner-up	
Otso	Wealand Ferrer	Nueva Ecija	21	Day 1	Day 43	43	Finalist	
Otso	Akie Poblete	Rome, Italy	24	Day 2	Day 43	42	Finalist	
Otso	Diana Mackey	Taguig	21	Day 2	Day 42	41	Evicted	
Otso	Franki Russell	New Zealand	24	Day 1	Day 42	42	Evicted	
Otso	Sky Quizon	Tarlac	21	Day 1	Day 36	36	Evicted	
Otso	Gino Roque	Quezon City	23	Day 2	Day 36	35	Evicted	
Otso	Hasna Cabral	Cavite	30	Day 1	Day 29	29	Evicted	
Otso	Mae Alfante	Davao	22	Day 2	Day 21	20	Evicted	
Otso	Jamie Salenga	Quezon City	27	Day 1	Day 15	15	Evicted	
Otso	Banjo Dangalan	Quezon City	27	Day 2	Day 10	9	Forcibly Evicted	
Otso	Ashley del Mundo	Australia	15	Day 15	Day 57	43	Winner	
Otso	Yen Quirante	Buhi, Camarines Sur	16	Day 7	Day 57	51	Runner-up	
Otso	Tan Roncal	Davao	14	Day 8	Day 57	50	Finalist	
Otso	Batit Espiritu	Nueva Ecija	19	Day 15	Day 57	43	Finalist	
Otso	Angela Tungol	Balanga, Bataan	17	Day 7	Day 55	49	Evicted	
Otso	Lance Carr	Davao City	18	Day 15	Day 55	41	Evicted	
Otso	Sheena Catacutan	Santiago, Isabela	14	Day 8	Day 53	46	Evicted	
Otso	Shoichi Oka	Japan	19	Day 7	Day 53	47	Evicted	
Otso	Mich Wunder	Leyte	18	Day 7	Day 43	37	Evicted	
Otso	Kyzha Villalino	Mandaue, Cebu	16	Day 8	Day 43	36	Evicted	
Otso	Emjay Savilla	Camarines Sur	16	Day 14	Day 43	30	Forcibly Evicted	
Otso	Jem Macatuno	Pampanga	18	Day 14	Day 36	23	Evicted	
Otso	Gwen Apuli	Albay	15	Day 14	Day 36	23	Evicted	
Otso	Alfred Beruzil	Lucena, Quezon	19	Day 8	Day 36	29	Evicted	
Otso	Shami Baltazar	Davao del Norte	15	Day 14	Day 29	16	Evicted	
Otso	Narcy Esguerra	San Pablo, Laguna	13	Day 15	Day 29	15	Evicted	
Otso	Yamyam Gucong	Bohol	25	Day 3	Day 85	81	Winner	
Otso	Fumiya Sankai	Japan	23	Day 3	Day 85	81	Runner-up	
Otso	Lou Yanong	Mandaluyong	21	Day 3	Day 85	81	Finalist	
Otso	Andre Brouillette	Hawaii, United States	21	Day 3	Day 85	81	Finalist	
Otso	Shawntel Cruz	Baguio	22	Day 55	Day 82	28	Evicted	
Otso	Thea Rizaldo	Bohol	22	Day 55	Day 82	28	Evicted	
Otso	Camille Sandel	Macabebe, Pampanga	23	Day 62	Day 78	17	Evicted	
Otso	Kim Franco	Davao City	23	Day 62	Day 78	17	Evicted	
Otso	Hanie Jarrar	Isabela City	19	Day 57	Day 71	15	Evicted	
Otso	Mark Obera	Davao de Oro	34	Day 13	Day 64	52	Evicted	
Otso	Mary Grace Lagos	Davao Occidental	28	Day 36	Day 64	29	Evicted	
Otso	JC Gamez	Rome, Italy	25	Day 43	Day 57	15	Evicted	
Otso	Wakim Regalado	Iloilo City	19	Day 3	Day 50	48	Evicted	
Otso	Mitch Talao	Lucena City	29	Day 3	Day 50	48	Evicted	
Otso	Tori Garcia	Singapore	24	Day 29	Day 43	15	Evicted	
Otso	Apey Obera	General Santos	22	Day 3	Day 36	34	Evicted	
Otso	Abi Kassem	Isabela	20	Day 3	Day 29	27	Evicted	
Otso	Lie Reposposa	Tagum, Davao del Norte	15	Day 2	Day 58	57	Winner	
Otso	Karina Bautista	Isabela	17	Day 2	Day 58	57	Runner-up	
Otso	Kaori Oinuma	Japan	18	Day 2	Day 58	57	Finalist	
Otso	Jelay Pilones	General Santos	18	Day 2	Day 58	57	Finalist	
Otso	Seth Fedelin	Cavite	16	Day 1	Day 57	57	Evicted	
Otso	Reign Parani	Winnipeg, Canada	15	Day 30	Day 57	28	Evicted	
Otso	Rhys Eugenio	Tarlac	17	Day 16	Day 54	39	Evicted	
Otso	Missy Quino	Cebu City	17	Day 37	Day 51	15	Voluntarily Exited	
Otso	Ali Abinal	Las Piñas	16	Day 23	Day 37	15	Evicted	
Otso	Aljon Mendoza	Pampanga	17	Day 1	Day 30	30	Evicted	
Otso	Criza Ta-a	Quezon City	14	Day 9	Day 23	15	Evicted	
Otso	Art Guma	Davao City	17	Day 1	Day 16	16	Evicted	
Otso	Josh Worsley	Samal, Davao del Norte	13	Day 1	Day 9	9	Evicted	

=== 2020–present ===
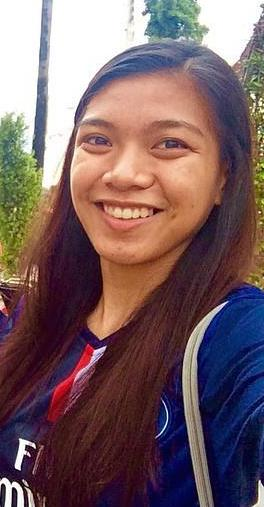
Alyssa Valdez, Kumunity 10 housemate

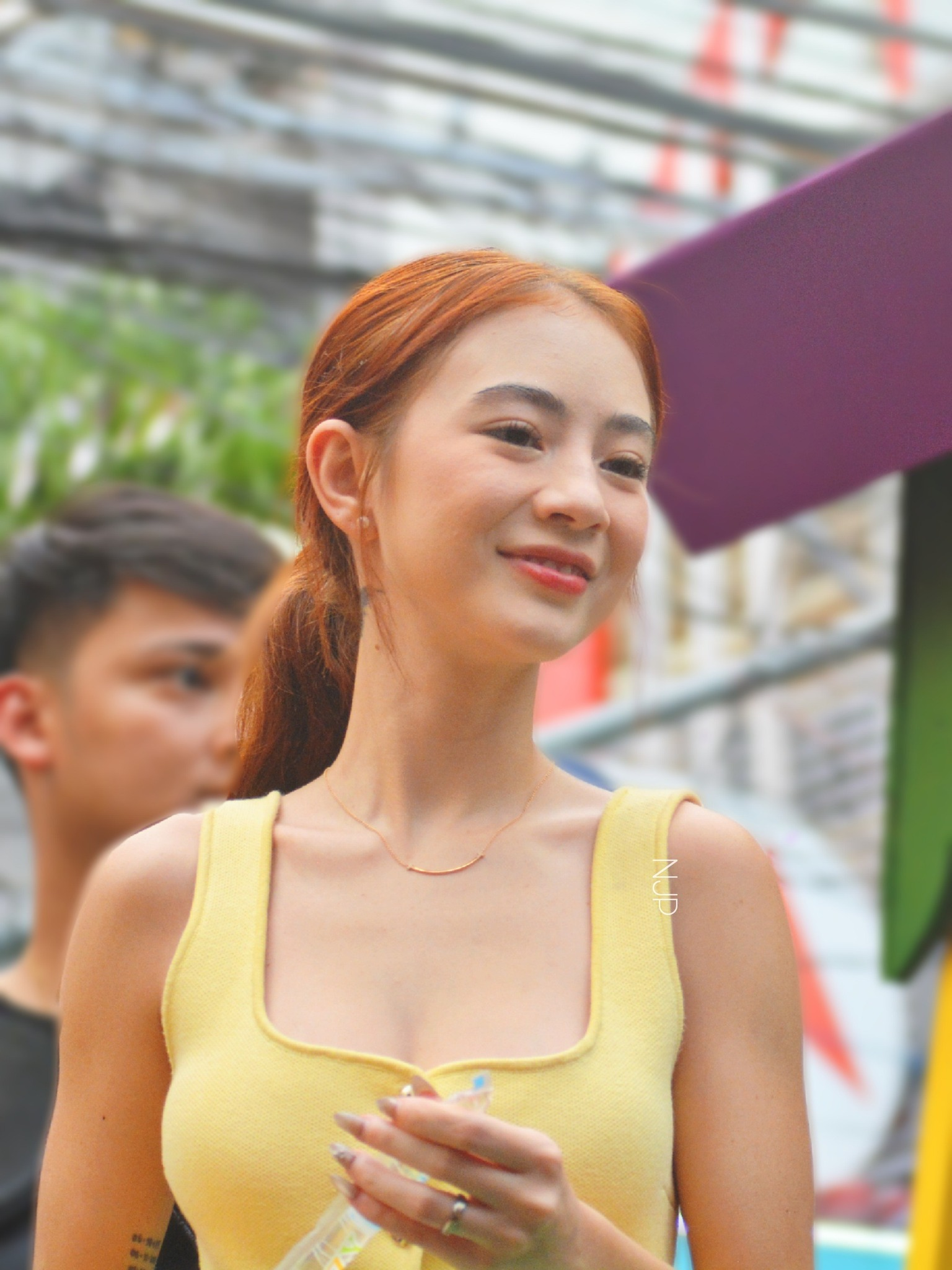
Fyang Smith, Gen 11 winner

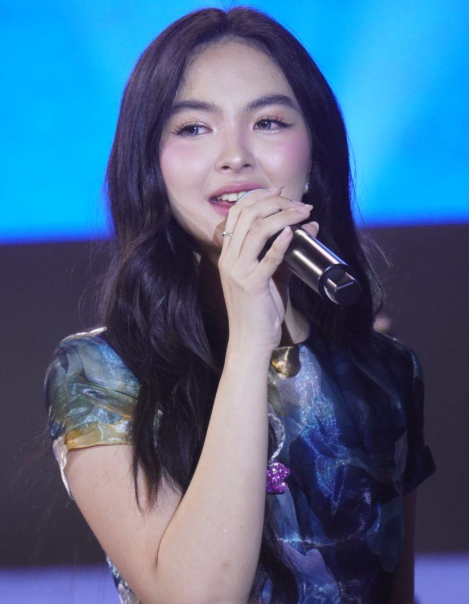
Kai Montinola, Gen 11 housemate

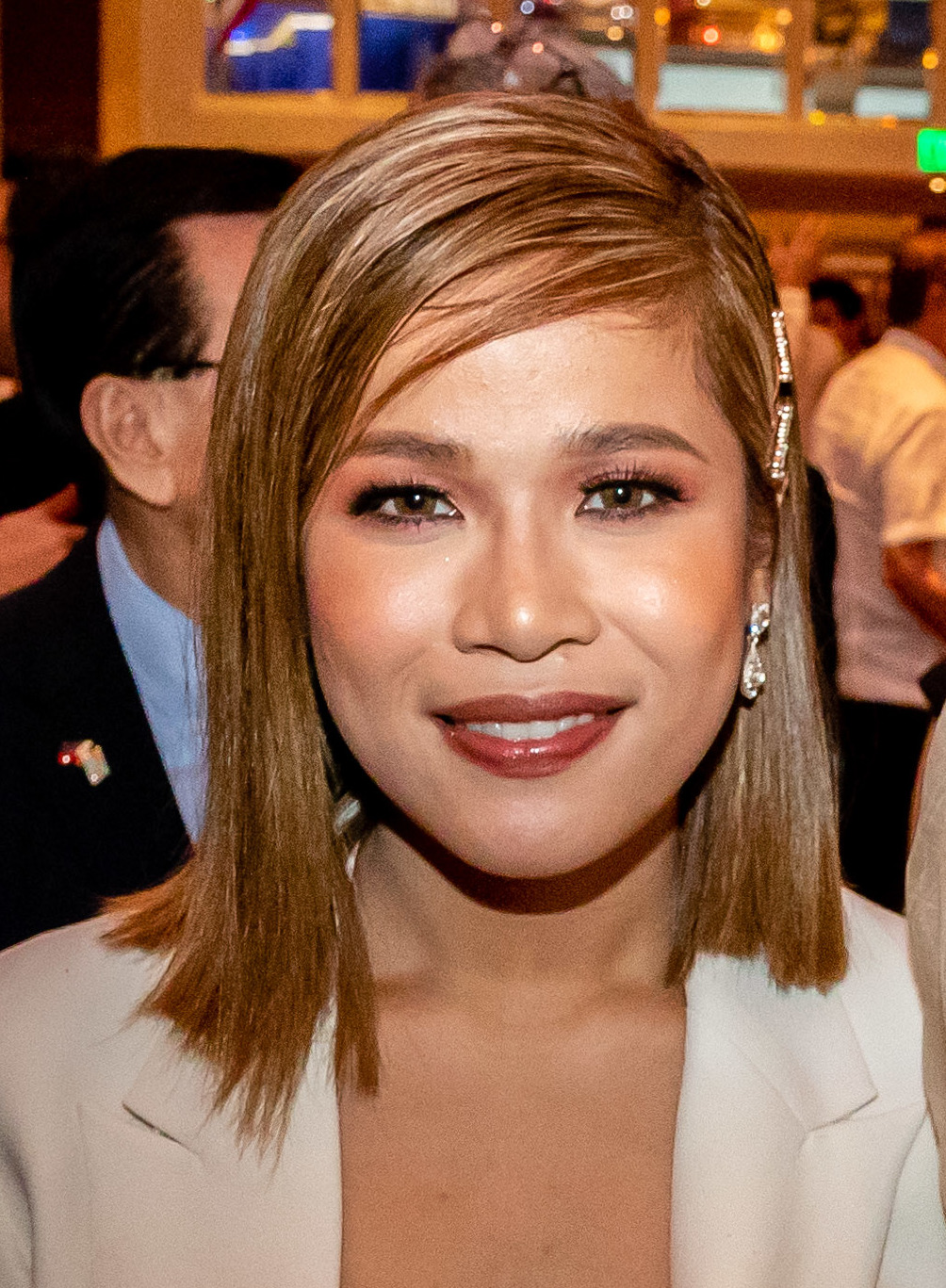
Klarisse De Guzman, Celebrity Collab Edition Kapamilya housemate

Season	Name	Hometown	Age on Entry	Day entered	Day exited	Days spent in house	Result	Refs
Connect	Liofer Pinatacan	Zamboanga del Sur	21	Day 4	Day 99	95	Winner	
Connect	Andrea Abaya	Parañaque	18	Day 1	Day 99	99	Runner-up	
Connect	Kobie Brown	Parañaque	17	Day 1	Day 99	99	Finalist	
Connect	Jie-Ann Armero	Sarangani	16	Day 1	Day 99	99	Finalist	
Connect	Amanda Zamora	San Juan City	19	Day 35	Day 95	60	Evicted	
Connect	Ralph Malibunas	Paris	22	Day 14	Day 95	81	Evicted	
Connect	Chico Alicaya	Cebu	26	Day 1	Day 92	92	Evicted	
Connect	Ella Cayabyab	Quezon	20	Day 1	Day 85	85	Evicted	
Connect	Quincy Villanueva	Laguna	26	Day 42	Day 78	36	Evicted	
Connect	Alyssa Exala	Australia	27	Day 4	Day 71	66	Evicted	
Connect	Gail Banawis	New York City	24	Day 49	Day 71	22	Evicted	
Connect	Kyron Aguilera	Butuan	16	Day 1	Day 64	64	Evicted	
Connect	Aizyl Tandugon	Misamis Oriental	21	Day 1	Day 57	57	Evicted	
Connect	Haira Palaguitto	Pangasinan	16	Day 1	Day 50	50	Evicted	
Connect	Crismar Menchavez	Palawan	19	Day 1	Day 43	43	Evicted	
Connect	Mika Pajares	Bataan	21	Day 1	Day 36	36	Evicted	
Connect	Russu Laurente	General Santos	19	Day 1	Day 29	29	Evicted	
Connect	Justin Dizon	Pampanga	22	Day 1	Day 22	22	Evicted	
Kumunity 10	Anji Salvacion	Surigao del Norte	19	Day 211 Day 1	Day 226 Day 78	94	Winner	
Kumunity 10	Isabel Laohoo	Leyte	26	Day 211 Day 78	Day 226 Day 147	85	Runner-up	
Kumunity 10	Samantha Bernardo	Palawan	28	Day 211 Day 1	Day 226 Day 77	93	Finalist Evicted	
Kumunity 10	Rob Blackburn	Laguna	19	Day 154	Day 226	72	Finalist	
Kumunity 10	Brenda Mage	Cagayan de Oro	32	Day 211 Day 1	Day 226 Day 77	93	Finalist Evicted	
Kumunity 10	Stephanie Jordan	Cebu	16	Day 210 Day 155	Day 225 Day 210	70	Evicted Evicted	
Kumunity 10	Gabb Skribikin	Pasig	19	Day 154	Day 225	71	Evicted	
Kumunity 10	Zach Guerrero	Aurora	23	Day 211 Day 78	Day 225 Day 147	84	Evicted Evicted	
Kumunity 10	Nathan Juane	Las Piñas	33	Day 211 Day 77	Day 225 Day 147	85	Evicted	
Kumunity 10	Michael Ver Comaling	Leyte	21	Day 211 Day 78	Day 225 Day 147	84	Evicted Evicted	
Kumunity 10	Madam Inutz	Cavite	36	Day 211	Day 217	84	Evicted	
Kumunity 10	Madam Inutz	Cavite	36	Day 1	Day 77	84	Evicted	
Kumunity 10	Maxine Trinidad	Davao City	17	Day 210	Day 216	62	Evicted	
Kumunity 10	Maxine Trinidad	Davao City	17	Day 154	Day 210	62	Evicted	
Kumunity 10	Paolo Alcantara	Nueva Ecija	15	Day 155	Day 210	56	Evicted	
Kumunity 10	Tiff Ronato	Northern Samar	19	Day 154	Day 204	51	Evicted	
Kumunity 10	Dustine Mayores	Marikina	19	Day 154	Day 204	51	Evicted	
Kumunity 10	Luke Alford	Batangas	17	Day 154	Day 197	44	Evicted	
Kumunity 10	Eslam El Gohari	Makati	17	Day 154	Day 197	44	Evicted	
Kumunity 10	Ashton Salvador	Quezon City	18	Day 154	Day 190	37	Evicted	
Kumunity 10	Stef Draper	Parañaque	15	Day 154	Day 183	30	Evicted	
Kumunity 10	Kai Espenido	Surigao del Norte	18	Day 154	Day 176	23	Evicted	
Kumunity 10	Don Hilario	Laguna	19	Day 154	Day 169	16	Evicted	
Kumunity 10	Seham Daghlas	Iloilo	22	Day 78	Day 147	70	Evicted	
Kumunity 10	Laziz Rustamov	Uzbekistan	24	Day 77	Day 141	64	Evicted	
Kumunity 10	Raf Juane	Las Piñas	25	Day 78	Day 141	65	Evicted	
Kumunity 10	Roque Coting	Davao de Oro	24	Day 99	Day 133	36	Evicted	
Kumunity 10	Gin Regidor	Cebu	21	Day 78	Day 133	56	Evicted	
Kumunity 10	Kathleen Agir-Zarandin	United States	25	Day 99	Day 133	36	Evicted	
Kumunity 10	Basti Macaraan	Italy	22	Day 97	Day 126	31	Evicted	
Kumunity 10	Jaye Macaraan	Italy	26	Day 97	Day 126	31	Evicted	
Kumunity 10	Rica Kriemhild	Italy	21	Day 78	Day 119	24	Evicted	
Kumunity 10	Aleck Iñigo	Las Piñas	23	Day 97	Day 119	42	Evicted	
Kumunity 10	Andrei King	Taguig	25	Day 99	Day 112	15	Evicted	
Kumunity 10	Thamara Alexandria	Davao	22	Day 78	Day 112	35	Evicted	
Kumunity 10	Alyssa Valdez	Batangas	28	— Day 1	Day 197 Day 78	78	Voluntarily Exited ~~Celebrity Top 2~~	
Kumunity 10	KD Estrada	Parañaque	19	Day 1	Day 71	72	Evicted	
Kumunity 10	Alexa Ilacad	Pasig	21	Day 1	Day 71	72	Evicted	
Kumunity 10	Eian Rances	Quezon	28	Day 19	Day 64	65	Evicted	
Kumunity 10	Jordan Andrews	London	30	Day 1	Day 64	47	Evicted	
Kumunity 10	Shanaia Gomez	Quezon City	19	Day 1	Day 57	57	Evicted	
Kumunity 10	Benedix Ramos	Pangasinan	27	Day 17	Day 57	41	Evicted	
Kumunity 10	Karen Bordador	Makati	35	Day 1	Day 51	51	Evicted	
Kumunity 10	TJ Valderrama	Manila	35	Day 1	Day 51	51	Evicted	
Kumunity 10	Kyle Echarri	Cebu	18	Day 5	Day 43	39	Evicted	
Kumunity 10	Chie Filomeno	Antipolo	25	Day 5	Day 36	32	Evicted	
Kumunity 10	Albie Casiño	Quezon City	28	Day 12	Day 29	18	Evicted	
Kumunity 10	John Adajar	Laguna	30	Day 1	Day 22	22	Evicted	
Gen 11	Fyang Smith	Mandaluyong	18	Day 16	Day 99	84	Winner	
Gen 11	Rain Celmar	Cebu	17	Day 1	Day 99	99	Runner-up	
Gen 11	Kolette Madelo	General Santos	20	Day 1	Day 99	99	Finalist	
Gen 11	Kai Montinola	Cebu	17	Day 1	Day 99	99	Finalist	
Gen 11	JM Ibarra	Quezon	23	Day 1	Day 92	92	Evicted	
Gen 11	JP Cabrera	Quezon City	18	Day 24	Day 85	62	Evicted	
Gen 11	Binsoy Namoca	South Cotabato	22	Day 1	Day 78	78	Evicted	
Gen 11	Jarren Garcia	London, UK	17	Day 1	Day 71	71	Evicted	
Gen 11	Jas Dudley-Scales	Dumaguete	24	Day 1	Day 64	64	Evicted	
Gen 11	Dylan Yturralde	Pampanga	21	Day 1	Day 57	57	Evicted	
Gen 11	Gwen Montano and Joli Alferez	Cavite and Camarines Sur	24 & 24	Day 33; Day 24	Day 50	18; 27	Evicted	
Gen 11	Jan Silva	Cebu	18	Day 16	Day 43	28	Evicted	
Gen 11	Dingdong Bahan and Patrick Ramirez	Taguig and Manila	27 & 26	Day 1	Day 36	36	Evicted	
Gen 11	Noimie Steikunas	Lithuania	32	Day 1	Day 29	29	Forcibly Evicted	
Gen 11	Brx Ruiz	Bacolod	32	Day 1	Day 29	29	Forcibly Evicted	
Gen 11	Kanata Tapia	Occidental Mindoro	16	Day 1	Day 22	22	Evicted	
Gen 11	Marc Naninga Jr.	Camarines Norte	17	Day 1	Day 22	22	Evicted	
Gen 11	Therese Villamor	Camarines Sur	17	Day 1	Day 15	15	Evicted	
Collab	Brent Manalo	Tarlac	27	Day 1	Day 119	119	Winner	
Collab	Mika Salamanca	Pampanga	24	Day 1	Day 119	119	Winner	
Collab	Ralph de Leon	Cavite	24	Day 71 Day 1	Day 119 Day 63	112	Runner-up Evicted	
Collab	Will Ashley	Cavite	22	Day 1	Day 119	119	Runner-up	
Collab	Charlie Fleming	Cagayan de Oro	16	Day 71 Day 1	Day 119 Day 35	84	Finalist Evicted	
Collab	Esnyr Ranollo	Davao Del Sur	23	Day 1	Day 119	119	Finalist	
Collab	AZ Martinez	Cebu	22	Day 1	Day 119	119	Finalist	
Collab	River Joseph	Muntinlupa	26	Day 1	Day 119	119	Finalist	
Collab	Bianca de Vera	Taguig	23	Day 10	Day 112	103	Evicted	
Collab	Dustin Yu	Quezon City	23	Day 1	Day 112	112	Evicted	
Collab	Klarisse de Guzman	Rizal	33	Day 1	Day 98	98	Evicted	
Collab	Shuvee Etrata	Cebu	23	Day 36	Day 98	63	Evicted	
Collab	Xyriel Manabat	Rizal	21	Day 36	Day 84	49	Evicted	
Collab	Vince Maristela	Rizal	25	Day 22	Day 84	63	Evicted	
Collab	Josh Ford	United Kingdom	21	Day 1	Day 63	63	Evicted	
Collab	Emilio Daez	Pasig	25	Day 22	Day 49	28	Evicted	
Collab	Michael Sager	Marinduque	22	Day 1	Day 49	49	Evicted	
Collab	Kira Balinger	Cavite	24	Day 1	Day 35	35	Evicted	
Collab	AC Bonifacio	Canada	22	Day 1	Day 21	21	Evicted	
Collab	Ashley Ortega	San Juan	26	Day 1	Day 21	21	Evicted	
Collab 2.0	Caprice Cayetano	Quezon City	16	Day 1	Day 127	127	Winner	
Collab 2.0	Lella Ford	Tacloban	18	Day 1	Day 127	127	Winner	
Collab 2.0	Heath Jornales	Taguig	16	Day 1	Day 127	127	Runner-up	
Collab 2.0	Krystal Mejes	Samar	17	Day 1	Day 127	127	Runner-up	
Collab 2.0	Ashley Sarmiento	Las Piñas	18	Day 1	Day 127	127	Finalist	
Collab 2.0	Joaquin Arce	Muntinlupa	18	Day 1	Day 127	127	Finalist	
Collab 2.0	Miguel Vergara	Rizal	18	Day 1	Day 127	127	Finalist	
Collab 2.0	Princess Aliyah	Bulacan	17	Day 1	Day 127	127	Finalist	
Collab 2.0	Carmelle Collado	Camarines Sur	18	Day 1	Day 120	120	Evicted	
Collab 2.0	Marco Masa	Rizal	18	Day 79 Day 1	Day 120 Day 36	84	Evicted	
Collab 2.0	Eliza Borromeo	Cavite	18	Day 79 Day 1	Day 99 Day 36	57	Evicted	
Collab 2.0	Sofia Pablo	Quezon City	19	Day 1	Day 99	99	Evicted	
Collab 2.0	Fred Moser	Albay	18	Day 1	Day 85	85	Evicted	
Collab 2.0	John Clifford	Cebu City	19	Day 1	Day 85	85	Evicted	
Collab 2.0	Rave Victoria	Tarlac	18	Day 1	Day 71	71	Evicted	
Collab 2.0	Anton Vinzon	Baguio	17	Day 1	Day 71	71	Evicted	
Collab 2.0	Iñigo Jose	Parañaque	20	Day 1	Day 50	50	Evicted	
Collab 2.0	Lee Victor	Cavite	16	Day 1	Day 50	50	Evicted	
Collab 2.0	Waynona Collings	Quezon City	18	Day 1	Day 22	22	Evicted	
Collab 2.0	Reich Alim	Makati	20	Day 1	Day 22	22	Evicted	
Collab 3.0	Allen Ansay	Camarines Sur	22	Day 23			In house	
Collab 3.0	Anthony Constantino	California, USA	24	Day 1			In house	
Collab 3.0	Bela Arcal	Cavite	29	Day 1			In house	
Collab 3.0	Daniela Stranner	Pampanga	24	Day 23			In house	
Collab 3.0	Eugene Reggio	United Kingdom	23	Day 30			In house	
Collab 3.0	Gehlee Dangca	Las Piñas	19	Day 1			In house	
Collab 3.0	Jeo Ong	Palawan	18	Day 1			In house	
Collab 3.0	Lans Nagal	Cavite	24	Day 1			In house	
Collab 3.0	Lexi Gonzales	Cavite	26	Day 30			In house	
Collab 3.0	Lorelaine Sañosa	Quezon City	23	Day 23			In house	
Collab 3.0	Mikee Quintos	Manila	28	Day 1			In house	
Collab 3.0	Nathan Garcia	Cebu	18	Day 1			In house	
Collab 3.0	Primo Alterado	Taguig	20	Day 1			In house	
Collab 3.0	Race Matias	Muntinlupa	29	Day 30			In house	
Collab 3.0	Raheel Bhyria	Las Piñas	24	Day 1			In house	
Collab 3.0	Ronnie Pasamba	Bulacan	19	Day 23			In house	
Collab 3.0	Shea Valerio	Rizal	19	Day 1			In house	
Collab 3.0	Victoria Vargas	Quezon City	23	Day 30			In house	
Collab 3.0	Winwyn Marquez	Parañaque	34	Day 1			In house	
Collab 3.0	Yza Uy	Quezon City	23	Day 30			In house	
Collab 3.0	Nicole Fortuna	Bohol	21	Day 1	Day 29	29	Evicted	
Collab 3.0	Cianne Dominguez	Rizal	25	Day 1	Day 29	29	Evicted	
Collab 3.0	Ethan Benares	Bacolod	20	Day 1	Day 22	22	Evicted	
Collab 3.0	Calix Esguerra	Pampanga	18	Day 1	Day 22	22	Evicted	

== Statistics ==
- Youngest housemate at entry: 12 years old – Bailey May^{1} (737 Teens)
- Oldest housemate at entry: 58 years old – Rudy Fernandez (Celebrity 1)
- Highest winning percentage: 81.96% to win – Miho Nishida (737 Adults)
- Closest winning percentage: 19.75% to 18.70% (1.05% difference) – James Reid to Ryan Bang (Teen Clash 2010)
- Highest eviction vote percentage: 88.31% to save – Fred Moser (Celebrity Collab 2.0)
- Lowest eviction vote percentage: -34.57% to save/evict – Joshua Garcia^{2} (All In)
- Closest eviction percentage: 0.07% difference:
  - 12.61% to save/evict to 12.68% to save/evict – Aizyl Tandugon to Ella Cayabyab^{2} (Connect)
  - 13.53% to save/evict to 13.60% to save/evict – Samantha Bernardo to Anji Salvacion^{2} (Kumunity Season 10)
- Most total nomination points: 99 – Ella Cayabyab^{1,}^{2} (Connect)
- Most times nominated: 10 times – Stephanie Jordan (Kumunity Season 10)
- Most total nomination points for a winner: 56 – Fyang Smith^{3} (Gen 11)
- Fewest total nomination points for a winner: 1 – Mika Salamanca^{3} (Celebrity Collab)
- Most total nominations points for a finalist: 50 – Kobie Brown (Connect)
- Fewest total nominations for a finalist: 0 – Jai and Joj Agpangan (Teen 4)
- Most days spent in the House: 165 days – Maymay Entrata (Lucky 7)
- Fewest days spent in the House: 3 days – JP Lagumbay (Double Up)
- Most times evicted: 3 times – Baninay Bautista & Elisse Joson (Lucky 7)

Notes

1. International record
2. Net percentage of save and evict votes combined.
3. Excluding automatic nominations by Big Brother or as a result of a failure in a task or challenge.
