= List of Ang Probinsyano guest stars =

This is a list of the guest cast of characters in the 2015 Filipino primetime television series FPJ's Ang Probinsyano under ABS-CBN Entertainment.

== List of guest cast ==
- Julio Diaz as Julian Valerio
- Tess Antonio as Train Passenger (Mother)
- Raikko Mateo as Train Passenger (Son)
- Gloria Sevilla as Purificación Moreno
- Cris Villanueva as P/Insp. Rev. Fr. Torre (Note: The character's rank is based on §28, R.A. No. 6975 (Department of the Interior and Local Government Act of 1990), the law governing police ranks at the time the character appeared on and/or exited from the show.)
- Lance Lucido as young Ryan Guzman
- Lisa Marie Marcos as young Rachel Tuazon
- Jervi Cajarop as President Benigno Aquino III
- Tony Mabesa as Priest at Ador and Carmen's wedding and Ador's burial
- Jao Mapa as PO1 Salas
- Ramon Christopher as SPO1 Ramos
- Baron Geisler as David and Dante "Bungo" S. Madarang
- Allyson McBride as Nicole Santos
- Izzy Canillo as young Ador de Leon and Cardo de Leon
- Alfonso Yñigo Delen as Buboy
- Felix Roco as Mall Crook
- Giovanni Baldisseri as P/Supt. Francisco Peralta
- Zeppi Borromeo as SPO2 Roberto "Bong" de Vera and Derick
- Sandino Martin as SPO2 Marlon Delgado
- Liza Diño as Hostaged Reporter
- Epy Quizon as Rebel Commander
- Zaijan Jaranilla as Cocoy Amaba
- Gio Alvarez as Arabas Amaba
- Mymy Davao as Elena "Lena" Amaba
- Crispin Pineda as Community Leader
- Makisig Morales as Alfonso S. Tuazon
- Nadine Samonte as Rose Dalisay
- Marco Alcaraz as PC/Insp. Dr. Ramon Dalisay, MD
- Sharlene San Pedro as teenage Glen Corpuz
- Nash Aguas as teenage Ador de Leon and Cardo Dalisay
- Jett Pangan as Edson Lee
- Iza Calzado as Col. Olivia Buenaventura
- Richard Quan as SPO4 Nestor Defra
- Richard Yap as Philip Tang
- David Chua as Kevin
- Carla Humphries as Teacher Ofelia
- Miguel Gabriel Diokno as Iñigo dela Paz
- Rufa Mi as Iñigo's nanny
- Jong Cuenco as Governor Edward dela Paz
- Jade Ecleo as Mrs. dela Paz
- Tutti Caringal as Dencio
- Lloyd Zaragoza as Dencio's partner
- Neil Coleta as MMDA Constable Miguel Clemente
- Eli Almiranes as MMDA Constable Andres "Andoy" Torre Jr.
- Val Iglesias as Bus Hijacker and Turo
- Yayo Aguila as Marita de Vela
- Kathleen Hermosa as Teresa "Tere" de Vela
- Jay Manalo as Victor Mangubat
- Ronaldo Valdez as Leonardo Demetrio/Conrado "Ninong" Villegas
- Rex Lapid as Gusting
- Maricar Reyes as Isabel
- Joem Bascon as Raymond
- Polo Ravales as Brad
- Hannah Ledesma as Jenna
- Miguel Faustmann as Kenneth Burton
- Sunshine Garcia as Noemi Dominguez
- Gina Pareño as Maria Olga "Madam Olga" Fernandez
- Susan Africa as Lorena
- Myrtle Sarrosa as Doreen Villaluna
- Justin Cuyugan as Apolinario "Apple" Mauricio
- Dawn Chang as Elaine Gomez
- Jason Francisco as Arnold Cortes
- Rein Gutierrez as Rosario
- Shey Bustamante as Cristina Jane "Tina" Laxamana
- Boy Roque as Yacht Helmsman
- Anne Curtis as Katrina "Trina" N. Trinidad
- Christopher de Leon as Michael "Mike" Alonso
- Ogie Diaz as Fritz
- Nonie Buencamino as Roberto Homer "Scarface" Dimayuga
- Alexa Macanan as teenage Trina N. Trinidad
- Cheska Iñigo as Rosella Noble-Alonzo
- Miko Palanca as Jake
- Jan Marini as PO3 Maricel Marquez
- Boom Labrusca as Waldo
- William Lorenzo as Berting
- Ana Capri as Ligaya (Berting's wife)
- Gerard Pizarras as SPO1 Marquez
- Pen Medina as Fernan
- Eric Quizon as Dr. Ivan Gomez
- Josh Ivan Morales as Tony
- Gelli de Belen as Belinda Ojeda
- Angelou Alayon as Jordan Ojeda, Jr.
- Niña Dolino as Iris
- Eric Fructuoso as Benjamin Joseph "Banjo" Moreno
- Alex Medina as Allen
- Jordan Herrera as Charlie Malibay
- Jef-Henson Dee as Olan
- Michael Rivero as Macario "Sir Bok" Samonte
- Tonton Gutierrez as SPO4 Pablo B. de Leon
- Ritz Azul as Erica Nobleza
- Yogo Singh as Jepoy
- Inah Estrada as Cristina Nobleza
- Jess Lapid, Jr. as PS/Insp. Raul Toribio
- Jake Cuenca as Jonas Paulino
- Elmo Magalona as Andrew Abella
- Janella Salvador as Denise Paulino
- Jane Oineza as young Flora Borja
- Toby Alejar as Mr. Paulino
- Maila Gumila as Mrs. Paulino
- Franco Daza as Kirk and Santiago
- Emmanuelle Vera as April Hizon
- Kyra Custodio as Lisa
- Melissa Mendez as Mrs. Abella
- Ian de Leon as PS/Supt. Bartolome "Bart" Catindig
- Smokey Manaloto as Gordon Layug
- Victor Neri as Mayor Anton B. Guerrero
- Apollo Abraham as Vice Mayor Rommel Dalagan
- Mon Confiado as Cheng Lao
- Bonel Balingit as Totoy Layug
- Lilia Cuntapay as Loring Layug
- Angelica Panganiban as Marta S. Maglipon/Jade Blanco
- Nikki Valdez as Analynne Canlaon
- Veyda Inoval as young Analynne
- Avery Balasbas as young Marta
- Suzette Ranillo as Dely (Analynne's mother)
- Lui Villaruz as Domeng Canlaon
- Renzel Palaje as Chabita
- Tina Paner as Teresa “Teri” Porres
- Yesha Camile as Angela Canlaon
- Juan Rodrigo as Romeo "Romy" Maglipon
- Wendell Ramos as Nelson Wong
- Cesar Montano as PS/Insp. Hector Mercurio
- Meg Imperial as Maribel "Marie" Alegre
- Bembol Roco as PC/Supt. Reynaldo Redentor Almario
- Bernadette Allyson-Estrada as Irene Mercurio
- Erin Ocampo as Ella
- Eddie Gutierrez as (Chief PNP) P/DGen. Rodolfo D. Recto
- Geraldine Villamil as Dahlia
- Archie Adamos as Leroy
- Manuel Chua as Zaldy
- Kiko Matos as Enteng
- Rendon Labrador as Joey
- Emilio Garcia as Atong
- Vice Ganda as Emmanuel "Ella" Moreno/Magdalena/Sharmaine
- Chokoleit as Jonel
- Pooh as Wanda
- Thou Reyes as Bogart
- Jeffrey Santos as Ella's neighbor
- Jordan Castillo as Ella's neighbor
- Bret Jackson as Matthew "Matt" Bale
- Candy Pangilinan as Aida Bale
- Lee O'Brien as Roland Bale
- Josh de Guzman as young Wanda/Juan
- JB Agustin as young Ella/Emmanuel
- Lance Macalinao as young Jonel
- John Regala as Congressman Randolf Subito
- Rubi Ruiz as Choleng
- Maria Isabel Lopez as Clarissa Subito
- Albie Casiño as Richmond Subito
- Cherry Pie Picache as Linda Aguilar
- Carlo Aquino as Marlon Aguilar
- Allan Paule as Melencio Aguilar
- Ronnie Quizon as Romulo
- Chanel Morales as Richmond's female drug consumer
- Raph Robes as Richmond's friend
- Ethan Salvador as Governor's son and Richmond's fellow drug dealer
- James Blanco as Edwin H. Maniego
- Paulo Avelino as Eric "Erwin" H. Maniego
- Jan Michael Patricio Andres as young Eric
- Jahren Dave Estorque as young Edwin
- Grae Fernandez as teenage Eric
- Jairus Aquino as teenage Edwin
- Jenny Miller as Eric and Edwin's stepmother
- Jef Gaitan as Lara
- Earl Ignacio as SOCO Police Officer Dante
- Jojo Riguerra as Mr. Recio
- Efren Reyes Jr. as Apollo Magat
- Jayson Gainza as Jimmyboy "Jimboy" Escaño
- Jose Sarasola as Apollo's henchman
- Joseph Ison as Apollo's henchman
- Mike Agassi as Froilan Asuncion
- Bradley Holmes as Franco
- Valerie Concepcion as Nurse Andrea
- Sophia Reola as young Alyana R. Arevalo
- Rez Cortez as PC/Supt. Rogelio Jacob
- Ricardo Cepeda as PC/Insp. Albertino Tejada
- Gerald Madrid as SPO2 Regalado
- Janus del Prado as Allan dela Paz/Jonel
- Paolo Serrano as SPO2 Soliman
- Miguel Enrile as Makmak's school bully
- Bing Davao as Roderick Wang
- TJ Trinidad as Atty. Patrick (Tomas' Lawyer)
- Cassey Mae Real as Trixie
- DJ Durano as Wang's right-hand man
- Antoinette Taus as Maggie Padua
- Johnny Revilla as Prosecutor
- Jun Urbano as Damian
- Nonong "Bangky" de Andres as Gorio
- Michelle Vito as Janice Vergel
- Tom Olivar as J/Dir. Raul Olarte
- Bearwin Meily as JO2 Timbang (Olarte's Jailguard)
- Dan Alvaro as Olarte's Jailguard
- Rommel Montano as Brando
- Archie Alemania as Choy
- Dido dela Paz as Inmate
- Christian Vasquez as Benedicto Vergel/Atty. Fernando Mante
- Carlo Maceda as Douglas
- Desiree del Valle as Monica Montenegro
- Menggie Cobarrubias as Cardo's defense lawyer
- Minco Fabregas as Prosecutor
- Lou Veloso as Miyong
- Spanky Manikan as Estong
- Carlos Morales as Anton
- Jeric Raval as Gener Guinto
- Alessandra de Rossi as Rowena Macaraeg
- Christopher Roxas as Marcelo
- Elia Ilano as Gigi (Onyok's sister)
- Dindo Arroyo as J/Dir. Guillermo Acosta
- Joseph Bitangcol as JO3 Cristobal Mendoza (Acosta's Jailguard)
- Mae Paner as Doray
- Pontri Bernardo as Danilo
- Alchris Galura as JO2 Roque (Acosta's Jailguard)
- Banjo Romero as Park Robber and Mr. Valdez's henchman
- Sue Prado as Lita Escaño
- Ronnie Lazaro as Romano "Chairman" Recio
- Deborah Sun as Maria (Julian's ex-wife)
- Paul Sy as Paeng
- Jojit Lorenzo as Amado Ignacio
- Aleck Bovick as Cora Ignacio
- Kristoffer King as Alwyn Recio
- Ranulfo Docdocan as Rannie
- Jelson Bay as Donato
- William Martinez as Jomar
- Jake Roxas as Daniel
- Jason Abalos as Alexis
- Maris Racal as Rona Carreon
- Sam Pinto as Isabel
- Sonny Parsons as Fidel
- Melizza Jimenez as Sally
- Ahron Villena as Drug Fish Syndicate Dealer
- Ketchup Eusebio as Drug Fish Syndicate Dealer
- Atoy Co as Drug Fish Syndicate Leader
- Daniel Fernando as Jack Chan
- Simon Ibarra as young adult Emilio Syquia and Enrique Vera
- Rochelle Barrameda as Teresa Syquia
- Anne Feo as Atty. Peralta (Don Emilio's lawyer)
- Mike Lloren as J/Dir. Benito Manlapig
- Harold Baldonado as Bolit
- Brando Legaspi as Jonard
- Bimbo Bautista as Atty. Andrew Mariano (Cardo's lawyer)
- Rolando Inocencio as Prosecutor Jason Herrera
- Jethro Ramirez as JO1 Perez (Ladronio's Jailguard)
- King Gutierrez as J/Dir. Pedro Ladronio
- Lito Legaspi as Jonathan Wu
- Joey Padilla as Joey Boy Tiocson (Wu's right-hand man)
- Nhikzy Calma as Atong
- Christian Morones as Albert Jacob
- Alma Concepcion as Bettina Jacob
- Biboy Ramirez as Drug Dealer
- Eslove Briones as CIDG's Accomplice
- Daryl Ong as Singer at Cardo and Alyana's Wedding
- KZ Tandingan as Singer at Cardo and Alyana's wedding
- Gary Valenciano as Singer at Cardo and Alyana's wedding
- Mark Lapid as Antonio "Tigre" del Mundo
- Ronwaldo Martin as Roldan/Gagamba
- Jun Hidalgo as Luis "Buwaya" Mangubat
- Gene Padilla as Pilo/Tuko
- Wilmar Peñaflorida as Mando/Ahas
- Edwin Nombre Pamanian as Hunyango
- Dino Pastrano as Col. Ernesto Capili
- Marco Gumabao as Jose Rafael "Joel" T. Olegario
- Mercedes Cabral as Aurora Dumaguit
- Yam Concepcion as Magdalena "Lena" Dumaguit
- Emmanuel Matteo Gabriel Plan as Emman
- Vickie Rushton as Amanda
- Tanner Mata as Clark
- Ron Morales as SPO2 Bernardo "Bernie" Quinto
- Dominic Roque as SPO3 Christian "Chris" Clemente
- Louise delos Reyes as SPO3 Katrina "Kat" Velasco
- Ejay Falcon as SPO2 Geraldo "Gerry" dela Paz
- Hero Angeles as SPO3 Mark Capellan
- Michelle Madrigal as SPO2 Sunshine Montenegro
- AJ Muhlach as Simon "Paniki" Yumul
- Dante Rivero as Domingo "Lawin" Bulaon
- Lito Pimentel as young Domingo Bulaon
- Jon Lucas as young Renato Hipolito
- Jomari Angeles as young Romulo Dumaguit
- Rey Solo as Kalabaw
- Benzon Dalina as Barakuda
- Paul Alvarez as Sebastian
- Aljur Abrenica as Miguel Enriquez
- Jestoni Alarcon as Javier Enriquez
- Lem Pelayo as SAF Officer Simpao
- Joko Diaz as Senator Mateo F. de Silva
- Alvin Anson as Alvaro
- Gerald Ejército as Ronald
- Roberto "Amay Bisaya" Reyes as Ruben
- Vince Rillon as Victor de Silva
- Angeline Quinto as Regine “Jean” Moreno
- Janno Gibbs as Bruno Moreno
- Rico J. Puno as Engelbert "Daga" Moreno
- Irma Adlawan as Dulce (Engelbert's wife)
- Ernie Garcia as Abdon
- Minnie Aguilar as Rebecca "Becky" Balaraw
- Anghel Marcial as Happy
- Joel Saracho as Dolfo
- Pocholo Barretto as P/CMSgt. Demetrio Pantig (Note: The character's rank is based on R.A. No. 11200, the current law prescribing police ranks in the Philippines.)
- Raph Fernandez as P/EMSgt. Juanito Gapuz
- Lowell Conales as Drug Dealer
- Via Antonio as Sheila Dueñas
- Bernard Palanca as Mayor Jethro "Jet" Garrido
- Lance Raymundo as Lester Magno
- Matet de Leon as Menchu Versoza
- Teroy de Guzman as Pedro Salao
- JV Kapunan as Danny B. Nobleza (Student Drug Dealer)
- Sarah Carlos as Michelle G. Abad (Nobleza's accomplice)
- Jimboy Martin as Redentor D. Padua (Nobleza's accomplice) and P/Cpt. Jerry Abalos
- Patrick Sugui as Blake C. de Palma (Nobleza's accomplice)
- Mara Alberto as Halina
- Nicco Manalo as Stephen "Peng" Balaraw
- Jessy Mendiola Andrea "Andi" B. Collins, RN/Violet
- MC Muah as Lala
- Gwen Garci as Hasmin Garcia
- Jaycee Parker as Marigold Parker
- Zara Lopez as Dalia Lopez
- Maui Taylor as Rose Taylor
- Katya Santos as Blossom Santos
- Andy Kunz as Mr. Gibson
- Viveika Ravanes as Kapitana Dindi
- Arnold Cortez as Mayor Rolando Magpantag
- Ali Khatibi as Joaquin Campos
- Rey "PJ" Abellana as Brother Lorenzo Alano
- Mayen Estanero as Teacher Cecil
- Arvic Tan as Xavier
- Carlo Mendoza as Tutoy Mendoza
- Ces Aldaba as Marsing
- Eva Vivar as Nita
- Isabela "Lala" Vinzon as Lorie
- Mel Feliciano as Mario
- Joross Gamboa as Jesus Nazareno “Tanggol” Dimaguiba
- Jess Evardone as Primo
- Juan Miguel Severo as Fredo
- Mhot as Simon
- Roderick Paulate as Mayor Adonis Dimaguiba
- Carmi Martin as Margarita "Margie" Corona
- Alora Sasam as Charlene Corona
- Amy Nobleza as Denise
- Rommel Padilla as Baldo
- Alvin Fortuna as PC/Supt. Perez
- Agnes Pabalan as Beth Espinosa
- Ced Torrecarion as Nico Espinosa
- Robert Arevalo as Efren Espinosa
- Marissa Delgado as Melba Espinosa
- Sue Ramirez as Marie Espinosa
- Marlo Mortel as Noel Marasigan
- Nikko Natividad as Bong
- Soliman Cruz as (Chief PNP) P/DGen. Alejandro Terante
- Mystica as Rosa
- Kid Lopez as Adonis
- Franco Laurel as Vice President Albert Hernandez
- Gian Magdangal as Executive Secretary Damien Ocampo
- Ryan Eigenmann as Daniel Gascon H. Dela Vega
- Sarah Jane Abad as Snooki
- Mark "Big Mac" Andaya as Bruno
- Darwin "Hap Rice" Tolentino as Tyson
- Gio Marcelo as Akiro
- Ivana Alawi as Madonna
- Alex Diaz as Jordan de Jesus
- Ariel Villasanta as Gapon
- Levi Ignacio as Diego
- Margaret Don as News Reporter
- Junjun Quintana as PS/Insp. Bueno
- Lance Serrano as PS/Insp. Cruz
- Roger Calvin as Domeng
- Micah Muñoz as Mr. Valdez
- Rey Malonzo as P/MGen. Manuel G. Dela Cruz
- Eric Perez as Judge Rogelio Salvacion
- Cogie Domingo as P/Cpt. Eric Opeña
- Jess Mendoza as P/Cpt. Henry Eugenio
- Mike Magat as P/Gen. (Chief PNP) Arnelio Peralta
- Ivan Carapiet as Cedrick
- Gardo Versoza as Lazaro "Uwak" Enriquez/Rodolfo Salazar
- Phoebe Walker as PS/MSgt. Catherine Parana
- Stacey Gabriel as P/MSgt. Tricia Almario
- Louise Gertrude as P/Lt. Isabel Tiongson
- Ana Jalandoni as P/Lt. Gelyn Gomez
- Jachin Manere as PS/MSgt. Celeste Miranda
- Agimat Maguigad as Gambler
- Leo Martinez as Kapitan Bartolome "Bart" C. Bulaan
- Gerard Acao as Timo
- Denise Laurel as P/Maj. Alessandra "Alex" T. Romero
- Nico Gomez as P/Cpt. Benjamin Santos
- Nilo Frias as PS/MSgt. Roger Cueto
- Zandro Salgado as P/Lt. Christopher Hernandez
- Jasmine Mendoza as Madeleine Lee
- Empoy Marquez as Domingo "Domengsu" Suarez
- Mel Martinez as Mamu
- Nadia Montenegro as Nida
- Alynna Asistio as Vanessa
- Caloy Alde as Buloy
- Dexie Diaz as Dexie
- Sammie Rimando as Raquel
- John Manalo as Pitoy
- Zeus Collins as Fredo
- Victor Silayan as Joselito "Bolit" Laxamana
- Ronald Asinas as Bolit's Goon
- Denise Joaquin as Michelle Rivera
- Arron Villaflor as P/Cpt. Amir Marquez
- Mart Escudero as P/Lt. Karlo Ramos
- Josef Elizalde as PLt. Louie Rallos
- Kaiser Boado as P/MSgt. Eric Gabriel
- Nick Apolinar as P/Lt. John Gary Tuaño
- KC Montero as Lance Mendez
- Kean Cipriano as Migz
- Jennifer Lee as Chloe M. Delgado
- Jon Achaval as P/MGen. Felipe Romero
- Pinky Marquez as Rosario T. Romero
- Cecille Escolano as Amelyn
- Jasper Visaya as Gaspar
- Judy Ann Santos-Agoncillo as Jane Sebastian/Maureen de los Santos
- Yasmyne Suarez as young Jane
- Franki Russell as P/MSgt. Hannah Robles
- Diana Mackey as P/Lt. Samantha Salazar
- Jessica Marasigan as PS/MSgt. Lea Singson
- Romnick Sarmenta as Juan/Lemuel Pineda
- Jhay Bruce "Piniski" Garcia as Elias
- Janice Hung as Meilin Yang
- Angela Clare Tan as young Meilin Yang
- Carlos Siguion-Reyna as Prof. Ernesto Tordesillas
- Kim Molina as Kagawad Bea Malonzo (spoof of Bea Alonzo)
- Priscilla Almeda as Krista Sandoval
- Paul Montecillo as Luis "Whiskey" Quijano
- Robert Seña as Stanley Galvez
- Jerald Napoles as Jimbo Padua
- Rhen Escaño as Clarice Padua
- Kara Mitzki as P/Lt. Serene Mendoza
- Ana Abad Santos as Ombudsman Castillo
- Dennis Raymundo as P/Cpt. Lawrence Raymundo
- Froilan Sales as Eduardo "Nico" Villamor
- Jose "Kaka" Balagtas as Bank Manager Eliza Dominguez's father and Donato
- Barbie Imperial as P/Lt. Camille Villaluna
- Isabelle de Leon as P/Lt. Marielle Lazcano
- Richard Manabat as Alejandro Galvez
- John Joseph Tuason as Mr. Chen
- James Llanes as Vice President Carlos Javellana
- Eric Nicolas as Ramon
- Marissa Sanchez as Maring
- Maynard Lapid as Salvador
- Mark Leviste as Antonio
- Robbie Packing as Mr. Castelo
- Julian Roxas as Julian
- Jeolanie Sacdalan as Berto
- Seth Fedelin as Macoy
- Kevin de Vela as Vito
- Edwin Pandagani as Mr. Reyes
- Jupeter Villanueva as Mr. Calavera
- Albert Langitan as Mr. Gonzales
- Marlon Mance as Dr. Nuevas
- Benjie Paraan as Ruben
- Angelo Valmoria Roxas as Bong Barrera
- James D.C Olipas as Eljin Ramirez
- Jonar del Rosario as P/Cpt. Bunye
- Johnmark Taraje as Tyron
- Vance Larena as PE/MSgt. Ivan Ponce
- Jane De Leon as P/Cpt. Natalia "Lia" Mante
- Mark McMahon as P/Cpt. Cris Fabia
- Paolo Paraiso as P/Cpt. David Alcantara
- AJ Raval as P/Cpt. Andrea Villar
- Edward Albe Pandagani as Col. Ed Sarmiento
- Marlon Liwanag as Antonio Liwanag
- Bubbles Paraiso as Lara Vera
- Drey Brown as Malena
- Jamina Cruz as Margarita
- Mitoy Yonting as Teban
- Giselle Sanchez as Pilar
- John Rollie Gabayno as Harold
- Soldier (Coco Martin's pet dog) as Soldier (Col. Pelaez's pet dog)
- Esmeraldo Valencerida as Col. Francisco Pelaez
- Peter Georgo as Mr. Wood
- Dini Ouattara as Dini (Mr. Wood's bodyguard)
- Chris Perris as Mr. Hanson
- Michael Millz as Michael (Mr. Hanson's bodyguard)
- Cristina Gonzales as Dr. Amalia Mante, MD
- Paulo Angeles as P/Lt. Jim De Castro
- Enzo Pineda as P/Cpt. Alvin Cuevas
- Aya Fernandez as Dr. Audrey Mante, MD
- Elaine Ochoa as P/Cpt. Victoria "Vicky" Cruz
- Danny Ramos as Winston Cabral
- Julia Montes as Mara Silang/Maria Isabel G. Hidalgo/Jennifer Salve
- Joseph Marco as Lucas Catapang
- John Estrada as Armando Silang
- Rosanna Roces as Lolita Silang
- Chase Romero as P/Lt. Castro
- MJ Reyes as P/Lt. Ramos
- Tommy Abuel as Don Ignacio Guillermo
- Vangie Labalan as Lucia Bueñas
- Marela Torre as Thalia Gonzales
- Chai Fonacier as Cheche
- Elora Españo as Aira
- Michael Flores as Samuel Catapang
- Christian Singson as Armando's henchman
- Rani Caldoza as Remy
- Rogerson Jimenez Pulido as Atty. Fred Santillan
- Nixon Mañalac as RJ
- John Wayne Sace as Omar Cuevas
- Ruben "Kidlat" Pedrosa as Sebastian
- Paul Ryan Aquino as Paeng
- Tanie Capiral as Ditas
- Roi Vinzon as Eduardo Guillermo
- Sharon Cuneta as First Lady Aurora Guillermo-Hidalgo
- George de Lumen as Mr. Babas
- Jared Gillett as William Calloway
- Resa Toledo as Ressa
- Alianna Duran as Delia
- Imee Casañas as Aimee Cruz
- Noel Colet as Senate President Camilo Edades
- Lally Buendia as Malacañang reporter
- Charo Santos-Concio as Ramona
- Jerome Ponce as P/Cpt. Adrian Jimenez
- Richard Arellano as Alfonso
- Erlinda Villalobos as Consuelo
- Michael Brian as Berto
- Raymond Bagatsing as Lucio Santanar
- Carl Medina as Kidlat
- Diego Romero as Nante
- Roni Petterson as Gen. Alvarez
- Jairus Daniel P. Reyes as Carlos

== See also ==
- List of Ang Probinsyano episodes
- List of Ang Probinsyano characters
