= Rudy Fernandez (triathlete) =

Filipino triathlete and reality television contestant (1947–2022)

Rodolfo Fernandez (December 5, 1947 – January 2, 2022), commonly known as Rudy and referred to as the "Iron Man of Asia", was a multi-awarded, one-legged Filipino triathlete from Iloilo who had finished a degree in Physical Education at the University of Baguio.

== Sports career ==
Fernandez competed in running, swimming, and cycling and was a member of the national team for running from 1972 to 1976. After his leg amputation in 1978, Fernandez continued to join triathlon competitions. He prided himself in always finishing the race despite the obvious handicap and won numerous medals in national and international competitions. He was also a participant in an athletic competition in early 2005 held in Singapore.

In 1996, Fernandez attracted attention by swimming the 28-mile Iloilo Strait from Guimaras to Iloilo in eight hours, beating Terry Fox's record who swam across the English Channel, which earned him the moniker "The Iron Man of Asia".

Also in 1996, Reader’s Digest dubbed him as one of Asia's "Heroes of Today".

Fernandez became a torchbearer for two multi-sport events: the 2001 SEA Games, and the Palarong Pambansa 2005 (Philippine National Games). He was also active in philanthropy and was supporting a charity that aids youth, especially those with physical disabilities and the differently-abled. This became his motivation in joining Pinoy Big Brother.

== Pinoy Big Brother ==
Fernandez was a housemate of ABS-CBN's Pinoy Big Brother (PBB): Celebrity Edition 1 with Good Shepherd's Fold Academy Orphanage as his chosen charity. His fellow housemates initially thought he was physically weak due to the amputation. However, they were not aware that he was given a clean bill of health by the show's doctors prior to entering the house. At 58 years old, his blood pressure was still at 120/80.

He was called "Tatay Rudy" by the housemates as he was the father figure of the other housemates. Big Brother and the fans refer to him as "Mang Rudy," out of their respect for his status and age. He was the oldest contestant, both in the Celebrity edition and in Pinoy Big Brother history. He was the first housemate to be officially evicted from the house on Day 21 (February 25, 2006). When he left, he gave away key chains to his fellow housemates as tokens of remembrance.

While in the house, the housemate he was most comfortable with was Gretchen Malalad and Mich Dulce. Fellow housemate Zanjoe Marudo had made a trademark quote on him saying, "Ang Iron Man, nag-joke na naman" ("The Iron Man is joking again") because of the corny jokes Fernandez cracks while laughing to himself. Fernandez had also given good advice to the other housemates before he left the house.

== Post PBB and later activities ==
Fernandez was still active in triathlon competitions after his stint in Pinoy Big Brother and even won a number of awards including the 2nd Capiz International Triathlon (TriAksyon) in 2018.

== Personal life ==
Fernandez was born in the town of Ajuy, Iloilo and raised in the premises of Good Shepherd's Fold Academy at Buenavista, Guimaras where he was once nicknamed "Dingky" as a child.

He had an amputation at the thigh of his right leg. The amputation was due to a grenade explosion at the former Alegro Theater in Iloilo City in July 1978 which also cost the life of his then 16-year-old brother-in-law who was sitting next to him at the movie theater. He began using a mechanical hydraulic prosthetic leg in the 1980s.

Fernandez was married to a midwife named Melba, with whom he had three sons, with the first names all ending in "itz" (Spitz, Fritz, and Ritz). He taught physical education at the Western Institute of Technology in Iloilo City. Biking was still part of his daily routine when he had no schedule for competition or whenever he was in his hometown.

== Death ==
Fernandez died on January 2, 2022, at Western Visayas Medical Center in Iloilo City, aged 74, due to natural causes. He was reportedly hospitalized on December 29, 2021, when he was not able to fully recuperate after he suffered a mild stroke while cycling at Zarraga, Iloilo on December 26, 2021. His remains were laid to rest at White Haven Memorial Park in the town of Zarraga on January 8, 2022. The Iloilo provincial government later gave a "posthumous plaque of recognition" to Fernandez which was received by his son Fritz.
