= Pinoy Big Brother: Celebrity Edition 1 =

Pinoy Big Brother: Celebrity Edition
- Season 1
- Presented by: Toni Gonzaga; Luis Manzano; Mariel Rodriguez
- No. of days: 56
- No. of housemates: 14
- Winner: Keanna Reeves
- Runner-up: John Prats

Release
- Original network: ABS-CBN
- Original release: February 5 – April 1, 2006

Season chronology
- Next → Celebrity Edition 2

The first season of the reality game show Pinoy Big Brother: Celebrity Edition (retroactively known as Celebrity Edition 1 after the season ended to differentiate it from the second celebrity season) premiered on the ABS-CBN network on February 5, 2006 and ran for 56 days until April 1, 2006.

The season was originally scheduled to start a day before (February 4, 2006), but due to the Wowowee ULTRA stampede that happened earlier that day, the management rescheduled the premiere on the next day. Due to this, Willie Revillame dropped his hosting stint from the show.

Keanna Reeves won the season, while John Prats was the runner-up. Bianca Gonzalez and Zanjoe Marudo were the finalists.

The program is produced and can be seen through ABS-CBN, Studio 23, the show's 24/7 cable channel, and the internet (ABS-CBN Now).

== Overview ==
=== House interior theme ===
The Big Brother house that is used on this edition is the same as the house used on the first season, although there were some changes in the house's interior.

The concept for this series is going back to basics. On the first day the Big Brother House initially had no furniture or appliances, with the exception of the plasma TV and the refrigerator. Part of this series' concept was forcing the housemates to use a stick for brushing their teeth, clay jars and an outdoor kitchen for cooking, bare hands for eating, and a water pump for potable water. All pieces of furniture provided to them were even made of bamboo.

After two weeks, Big Brother lifted the "Back to Basics" concept after seeing the housemates adapting to the said lifestyle, despite difficulties. The Forbidden Room, a pink-walled room with beds and mattresses reserved only for eviction nominees, became the ladies' bedroom, while the bamboo beds in the eventual men's bedroom were suddenly covered with mattresses. Earlier, they were provided with a microwave oven, an electric stove, utensils, and some toothbrushes and were allowed to use the swimming pool at any time, as well as wearing footwear indoors. Later, sofas replaced the bamboo benches in the living room.

=== Hosts ===
Toni Gonzaga and Mariel Rodriguez reprised their roles for this season. Willie Revillame was also supposed to reprise his role as host but withdrew due to the Wowowee ULTRA stampede that happened a day before the season's premiere.

Talk show host Boy Abunda hosted the Big Debate, a debate show which celebrity supporters of the four housemates debate on who should be the winner of the series. The debate was held two nights before the Big Night.

=== Prizes ===
The prizes at stake cost three million Philippine pesos, which includes ₱1,000,000 for the winning housemate, another ₱1,000,000 for the winner's chosen charity, and another million for the charity of Big Brother's choice. Aside from the cash prizes, a condominium unit in Valenzuela City is also at stake.

== Celebrity housemates ==
The show began with a welcome party along Manila Bay. They were transported by yacht before the chosen housemates was formally introduced and were taken to the Big Brother House. A prayer that is led by Jesuit priest Fr. Tito Caluag, S.J., a minute of silence and a performance of "You Raise Me Up" were done before the show started to commemorate those who have been affected by the Wowowee stampede. Furthermore, Myx VJ Luis Manzano played pinch hitter for Willie Revillame, who was at the time still devastated by the said stampede.

Below are the housemates who are introduced in the Grand Welcome Party. Rather than twelve in the original edition, fourteen were chosen for this edition and are listed below in order of introduction. Days before the Grand Welcome Party, only their feet were shown. However, in the morning of the Grand Welcome Party's new date, the Philippine Star prematurely published a full-page advertisement showing the new housemates in full view.

Name	Age on entry	Notability	Entered	Exited	Result
Keanna Reeves	36	Starlet	Day 1	Day 56	Winner
John Prats	21	Actor and dancer	Day 1	Day 56	Runner-up
Bianca Gonzalez	22	TV host and model	Day 1	Day 56	3rd Place
Zanjoe Marudo	23	Commercial model	Day 1	Day 56	4th Place
Budoy Marabiles	33	Reggae band frontman, songwriter	Day 1	Day 49	Evicted
Rustom Padilla	38	Actor	Day 1	Day 46	Voluntary exit
Rico Robles	25	Radio personality	Day 1	Day 42	Evicted
Roxanne Barcelo	21	Singer and actress	Day 1	Day 41	Voluntary exit
Gretchen Malalad	26	SEA Games gold medalist, beauty queen	Day 1	Day 39	Evicted
Aleck Bovick	25	Actress	Day 1	Day 35	Evicted
Christian Vasquez	28	Actor and model	Day 1	Day 28	Evicted
Rudy Fernandez	58	Triathlete	Day 1	Day 21	Evicted
Mich Dulce	24	Fashion designer	Day 1	Day 21	Forced eviction
Angela Calina	30	TV host and news reporter	Day 1	Day 12	Voluntary exit

== Chronology ==
- February 21: Gretchen left the house on after Big Brother allowed Gretchen to report to her superiors in the Philippine Air Force, where she serves as a second-class airwoman, to face a summary investigation about her being AWOL, as reported by the Philippine Daily Inquirer. He did this in the proviso that she cannot talk to anyone except those who were investigating her and she must return to the house 24 hours after she left. She returned 14 hours later after the Philippine Air Force officially authorized her to continue her stint in the show.
- February 23: Rico and Aleck had their heads shaved in exchange for P100,000 for each of their beneficiaries: Aleck's father and Mich's caretaker. Rico took what is supposed to be Mich's sacrifice because the latter was advised not to do so due to her emotional anxiety. Their hair was donated to make wigs for young cancer patients.
- February 28: Rustom came out of the closet on national TV by revealing to fellow housemate Keanna Reeves that he is a homosexual. Although parts of it were aired later in the day as it is traditionally, it was aired the next day in its entirety.
- March 6–7: Jasmine Trias visited the housemates and stayed in the house overnight.
- March 10: Gretchen, Rustom, and Rico temporarily "exited" the house as sacrifice for their nominated friends Aleck, Keanna, and Roxanne respectively. It turns out that it was actually a task to test their trust to their friends. Gretchen and Rico returned in the wee hours of the next day while Rustom returned in morning. Voting was not affected regardless.
- March 22: After Rustom's exit, it was announced that Toni handed over her main hosting chores to Mariel, starting the next day. Season 1 contestants Say Alonzo and Uma Khouny would take over as hosts of UpLate. Luis would host the last eviction night. At the time, Toni had her official engagements in the United States. She only returned on the night of the Teen Edition's finale.
- March 26: Season 1 contestant Jason Gainza and ABS-CBN actress Sandara Park entered the house disguised as hooded secret agents to steal the housemates' golden eggs under the directions of Big Brother. Although the two did manage to steal John and Zanjoe's eggs, the housemates found the agents, and as a result the two stayed overnight. Earlier in the day, with the blindfolded housemates as virtual nannies, child stars (from ABS-CBN's Goin' Bulilit and Little Big Star) entered the house and created chaos, also as instructed by Big Brother.
- March 27–28: Season 1 winner Nene Tamayo and veteran actor Tirso Cruz III also entered the house as hooded secret agents, trying to steal John and Zanjoe's eggs. Unlike Jason and Sandara before them, they were successful in stealing John's 25 eggs and Zanjoe's 22. Another season 1 contestant, Franzen Fajardo, would later join the two to steal various supplies to test the housemates.

== Nomination history ==
Pinoy Big Brother: Celebrity Edition 1 nomination history
	#1	#2	#3	#4	#5	#6	#7	BIG NIGHT	Nominations received
Eviction day and date	Day 14 February 18	Day 21 February 25	Day 28 March 4	Day 35 March 11	Day 39 March 15	Day 42 March 18	Day 49 March 25	Day 56 April 1	Nominations received
Nomination day and date	Day 7 February 11	Day 14; February 18	Day 22; February 26	Day 29; March 5	Day 36; March 12	Day 40; March 16	Day 43; March 19	Day 50; March 26	Nominations received
Keanna	Budoy; Rudy	No; Nominations	Christian; Aleck	Aleck; Roxanne	Gretchen; Zanjoe		Zanjoe; Bianca	Winner	16 (+1)
John	Angela; Rico	No nominations	Christian; Roxanne	Aleck; Roxanne	Rico; Gretchen		Budoy; Zanjoe	Runner-Up	4
Bianca	Rico; Gretchen	No nominations	Rico; Gretchen	Rico; Gretchen	Gretchen; Budoy		Budoy; Rustom	3rd Place	9
Zanjoe	Mich; Keanna	No nominations	Rico; Rustom	Aleck; Rico	Gretchen; Rico		Rustom; John	4th Place	17
Budoy	Aleck; Zanjoe	No nominations	Bianca; Roxanne	Roxanne; Bianca	John; Gretchen		Zanjoe; Bianca	Evicted (Day 49)	8
Rustom	Rudy; Angela	No nominations	Christian; Roxanne	Aleck; Bianca	Zanjoe; Bianca		Bianca; Zanjoe	Voluntarily Exited (Day 47)	8 (+1)
Rico	Aleck; Mich	No; Nominations	Aleck; Christian	Rustom; Aleck	Zanjoe; Gretchen		Evicted (Day 42)		25 (+1)
Roxanne	Rico; Angela	No nominations	Rico; Aleck	Aleck; Gretchen	Gretchen; Keanna		Voluntarily Exited (Day 41)		7
Gretchen	Keanna; Aleck	No nominations	Rico; Keanna	Keanna; Zanjoe	Zanjoe; John	Evicted (Day 39)			15
Aleck	Keanna; Mich	No nominations	Rico; Zanjoe	Keanna; Budoy	Evicted (Day 35)				20
Christian	Keanna; Rustom	No nominations	Rico; Keanna	Evicted (Day 28)					7 (+1)
Rudy	Keanna; Zanjoe	No; Nominations	Evicted (Day 21)						6 (+1)
Mich	Rico; Rudy	No nominations	Forced Eviction (Day 21)						4
Angela	Rudy; Rustom	Voluntarily Exited (Day 12)							4
Notes	See note 1	See note 2	See note 3	None				See note 4	
Up for eviction	Keanna; Rico; Rudy	Keanna; Rico; Rudy	Christian; Rico; Rustom	Aleck; Keanna; Roxanne	Gretchen; John; Rico; Zanjoe	John; Rico; Zanjoe	Bianca; Budoy; Rustom; Zanjoe	Open Voting	
Saved from eviction	Keanna; Rico; Rudy	Rico; 53.00% Keanna; 24.00%	Rustom; 46.50% Rico; 40.90%	Keanna; 63.00% Roxanne; 23.40%	Housemate 1; 32.40% Housemate 2; 26.60% Housemate 3; 24.50%	Zanjoe; 39.70% John; 32.00%	Zanjoe; 44.00% Bianca; 33.00%	Keanna; 44.21%	
Evicted	No Eviction	Rudy; 23.00%	Christian; 13.50%	Aleck; 13.60%	Gretchen; 14.50%	Rico; 28.30%	Budoy; 27.40%	John; 28.79% Bianca; 18.99% Zanjoe; 8.00%	
Forced Eviction	none	Mich	none					John; 28.79% Bianca; 18.99% Zanjoe; 8.00%	
Voluntary Exit	Angela	none				Roxanne	Rustom	John; 28.79% Bianca; 18.99% Zanjoe; 8.00%	

Legend
Housemate was automatically nominated as part of a rule violation or other special cases.

^Note 1: With Angela's exit on Day 12, the eviction on Day 14 was canceled and was made into a nomination night.
^Note 2: Big Brother automatically put up for Eviction the nominees from the previous nominations, whom were saved after Angela's exit.
^Note 3: Big Brother automatically nominated Christian and Rustom for their violations, and therefore only the housemate with the highest nomination points was included in the list of nominees.
^Note 4: Open voting for the Big 4 was announced after Budoy's exit.

== The Big Night ==
The four remaining housemates were taken to the Manila Post Office from the Big Brother house in Quezon City by a limousine. They were then sequestered in a secret location before the actual live final.

The finale was held on April 1, 2006, at the Manila Post Office building on Lawton, Manila. In the final tally, Keanna Reeves was declared the Big Winner, garnering 44.2% of the vote (571,607 votes). John Prats came in second with 28.8% (372,198 votes), Bianca Gonzalez in third with 19% (245,594 votes), while Zanjoe Marudo exited first (and therefore came in last) with 8% (103,422 votes).

== Notable people ==
Vice Ganda auditioned for PBB: Celebrity Audition 2006 but failed to make it to the final line-up.

Preceded by Season 1	Pinoy Big Brother: Celebrity Edition (February 5 – April 1, 2006)	Succeeded by Teen Edition 1
