= Mich Dulce =

Filipina fashion designer, reality show actor, and musician

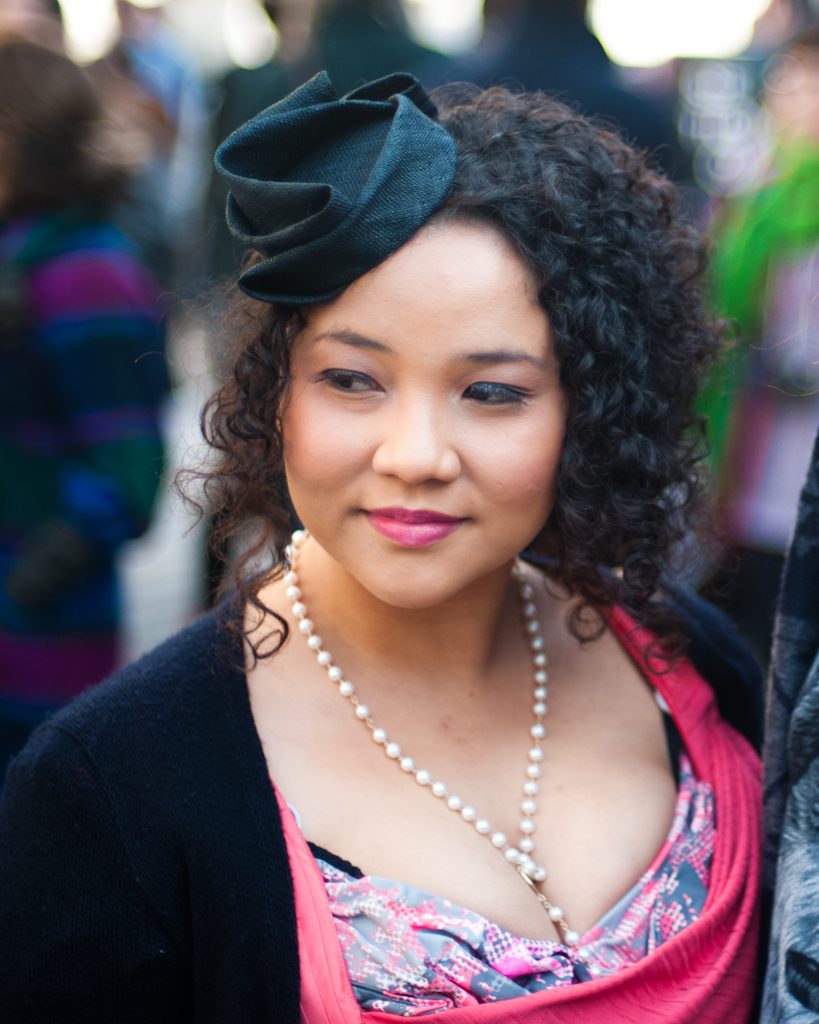
- Mich Dulce at the 2010 London Fashion Week.

Background information
- Born: Michelle Dianne Lopez Dulce; 8 May 1981 (age 44); Quezon City, Philippines
- Genres: Riotgrrl, indie pop
- Occupations: Milliner, Corsetiere, Fashion Designer, Vocalist, Activist
- Instrument: Vocals
- Website: www.michdulce.com

Mich Dulce (born Michelle Dianne Lopez Dulce on May 8, 1981) is a Filipina fashion designer, milliner, corsetiere, feminist activist, actress, artist and vocalist of bands Death By Tampon, Us-2 Evil-0 and The Male Gaze.

== Biography ==
She graduated from the Poveda Learning Center in Quezon City (now Saint Pedro Poveda College), and attended the Ateneo de Manila University where she earned a college degree in Bachelor of Arts in Interdisciplinary Studies: Management and Communications Track. She worked with professional designers like Jessica Ogden, Marjan Pejoski and Cecile Zamora. After college, she attended a series of short Courses at the London College of Fashion and Central Saint Martins College of Art and Design both in London.

She returned to the Philippines to pursue further studies in design at the University of the Philippines and the Philippine International School of Fashion. In 2004 she went to the United States to study Merchandise planning at the Fashion Institute of Technology in New York.

In 2005 she opened Store for All Seasons with Cecile Zamora.

In 2006, Dulce was one of the 14 housemates of ABS-CBN's Pinoy Big Brother: Celebrity Edition. She left the house after suffering from asthma brought on by anxiety attacks and was treated at the Philippine Heart Center. She was evicted after she opted not to return to the BB House within the requisite 24 hours of medical advice.

In 2009, the Mich Dulce label was first sold globally, with stockists in Manila, London, Tokyo, Hong Kong, and Singapore.

Beginning in 2010, she focused on her career as a milliner and corsetiere, gaining popularity for her bespoke period style corsets that can take off up to 6 inches on the waist.

In March 2017, Dulce founded Grrrl Gang Manila, a feminist collective that aims to create safe spaces for women both online and offline.

== Notable clients and commissions ==
Celebrity Mich Dulce millinery wearers are American Pop star Lady Gaga, Vogue Nippon Editor and fashion icon Anna Dello Russo, socialite Paris Hilton, British singers Paloma Faith and Shingai Shoniwa.

Mich Dulce millinery has been featured on the American show Gossip Girl on Leighton Meester as well as on other cast members on the same show. The Carrie Diaries also featured Mich Dulce millinery in the pilot episode.

British music icon Adam Ant wore a bicorn by Mich Dulce as part of his stage costume with his band Adam Ant and The Good, The Mad, and The Lovely Posse. The hat was featured extensively in his album Adam Ant Is The Blueblack Hussar in Marrying The Gunner's Daughter and in much of the publicity around the mentioned album, continuing to be worn onstage until 2017.

== Fashion Awards ==
In 2002, Mich was a finalist for the Paris Young Designer's Competition and 1st runner up in the MEGA Young Designer's Competition. In 2004 she was nominated for Revolutionary Designer of the Year at the MTV Style Awards, and in 2007 she won the Fashion Designer of the Year Award for Streetwear at the MEGA Fashion Awards.

In February 2010, Dulce won the prestigious British Council International Young Creative Entrepreneur (IYCE) International Young Design Entrepreneur of the Year (IYDEY) award for Fashion at London Fashion Week.

== Filmography ==
=== Television ===
- Pinoy Big Brother: Celebrity Edition (2006)
- John en Shirley (2006–2007)
- The Wedding (2009)

== Discography ==
=== Us-2 Evil-0 ===
- Dirty Debutantes (2011), EMI Records
