= Angela Calina =

Filipino TV personality

Angela Calina is a Filipino TV personality. She was a contestant and the first housemate to voluntarily exit the house in ABS-CBN's hit reality show Pinoy Big Brother: Celebrity Edition. She is a local news anchor and TV host in Cebu City.

She was born in 1976 in Cebu City and currently a single mother to a one daughter named Aira. Angela's decision to leave the Big Brother house followed a TV Patrol World report that said burglars broke into her apartment unit in Barangay Mabolo, Cebu City and for the safety of her family.

She was recently seen in the PBB Celebrity Edition Victory Reunion Party along with the complete housemates for that season.

== Filmography ==
=== TV shows ===
- Magandang Umaga Bayan (2002–07)
- Maayong Buntag Kapamilya (2006)
- Homebuddies (1998–2001)
