= Pinoy Big Brother: Collab 3.0 =

Season of a Philippine television reality show

- Season 12
- Title card
- Hosted by: Bianca Gonzalez; Robi Domingo; Gabbi Garcia; Melai Cantiveros; Enchong Dee; Alexa Ilacad; Michael Sager
- No. of days: 30
- No. of housemates: 24
- Companion shows: The OnlineVerse; iWant PBB Extra
- No. of episodes: 30

Release
- Original network: GMA Network
- Original release: October 24, 2026 – present

Season chronology
- ← Previous; Gen 11

Pinoy Big Brother: Collab 3.0 is the twelfth season of the reality television series Pinoy Big Brother. The season premiered on October 24, 2026, on GMA Network, in collaboration with the franchise holder ABS-CBN Studios. The third "collab" edition between the networks, the season features both civilian and celebrity housemates and is the first to be filmed in the new house at the ELJ Communications Center in Quezon City.

== Format ==
The season introduces a “merged collab” format, combining regular adult housemates and celebrity housemates in a single competition for the first time in the series. Both types of housemates compete together under two teams representing the participating networks: Kapuso (GMA Network) and Kapamilya (ABS-CBN).

Unlike the previous Collab seasons, which grouped housemates into pairs in Collab 1 and larger groups in Collab 2.0, this edition features an individual competition while retaining the two-network team structure. Despite the merged lineup, the season maintains the Collab format's eviction system, in which one Kapuso and one Kapamilya housemate are evicted in each eviction round. Regular adult housemates are also assigned to either network's team, rather than competing as a separate group.

For the first time since Gen 11, the eviction schedule followed a weekly format, replacing the bi-weekly eviction process. And for the first time since Otso, the nominations show now held live once again on Sundays.

=== Twists ===
- Ka-Collab ni Kuya: One Kapuso housemate and one Kapamilya housemate would serve as Big Brother’s collaborators, which later revealed that they will be the ones who will secretly initiate this season's Big Collab Charity Mission.
- Ligtask Challenge: Carried over from Collab 2.0, the Ligtask returns as an immunity challenge. Each challenge takes place before a nomination round to determine which housemates will be exempt from nominations. The best-performing housemate from each side earns immunity. In the event of a tie in the nominations, the Ligtask winners from both groups have the power to break the tie among the tied nominees.

== Housemates ==
The partial cast of Pinoy Big Brother: Collab 3.0. Column 1: Anthony, Gehlee, Nathan, Nicole, Raheel Column 2: Bela, Jeo, Shea Column 3: Calix, Lans, Robbie (houseguest) Column 4: Cianne, Ethan, Mikee, Primo, Winwyn

On Day 1 (October 24), 16 individuals were introduced as housemates, divided into two groups with no direct association with the agencies for the regular housemates: eight "Kapuso" housemates and eight "Kapamilya" housemates. Among them was Robbie Jaworski, a 26-year-old actor from Pasig, who would later be revealed as a non-competing houseguest on Day 16 (November 8). Four additional housemates entered the house on Day 23 (November 15). Five additional housemates entered the house on Day 30 (November 22).

A total of twenty-four people entered the house, twelve from each network, consisting of ten celebrities and fourteen regular adult housemates.

List of Pinoy Big Brother: Collab 3.0 housemates
Name	Age on Entry	Hometown	Distinction	Type	Occupation	Day entered	Day exited	Status
Allen Ansay	22	Camarines Sur	Kapuso	Celebrities	Actor	Day 23	—N/a	Safe
Anthony Constantino	24	California, U.S.	Kapuso	Celebrities	Actor and model	Day 1	—N/a	Safe
Bela Arcal	29	Cavite	Kapuso	Regulars	Overseas factory worker	Day 1	—N/a	Safe
Daniela Stranner	24	Pampanga	Kapamilya	Celebrities	Actress	Day 23	—N/a	Safe
Eugene Reggio	23	United Kingdom	Kapamilya	Regulars	Model	Day 30	—N/a	Safe
Gehlee Dangca	19	Las Piñas	Kapamilya	Celebrities	Performer	Day 1	—N/a	Safe
Jeo Ong	18	Palawan	Kapamilya	Regulars	Content creator	Day 1	—N/a	Safe
Lans Nagal	24	Cavite	Kapuso	Regulars	Student and content creator	Day 1	—N/a	Safe
Lexi Gonzales	26	Cavite	Kapuso	Celebrities	Actress	Day 30	—N/a	Safe
Lorelaine Sañosa	23	Quezon City	Kapamilya	Regulars	Dance choreographer	Day 23	—N/a	Safe
Mikee Quintos	28	Manila	Kapuso	Celebrities	Actress	Day 1	—N/a	Safe
Nathan Garcia	18	Cebu	Kapamilya	Regulars	Model	Day 1	—N/a	Safe
Primo Alterado	20	Taguig	Kapamilya	Regulars	Content creator	Day 1	—N/a	Safe
Race Matias	29	Muntinlupa	Kapamilya	Celebrities	Actor	Day 30	—N/a	Safe
Raheel Bhyria	24	Las Piñas	Kapuso	Celebrities	Actor and boxer	Day 1	—N/a	Safe
Ronnie Pasamba	19	Bulacan	Kapuso	Regulars	Athlete	Day 23	—N/a	Safe
Shea Valerio	19	Rizal	Kapamilya	Regulars	Student and beauty queen	Day 1	—N/a	Safe
Victoria Vargas	23	Quezon City	Kapamilya	Regulars	Fashion designer	Day 30	—N/a	Safe
Winwyn Marquez	34	Parañaque	Kapuso	Celebrities	Actress and beauty queen	Day 1	—N/a	Safe
Yza Uy	23	Quezon City	Kapuso	Regulars	Beauty queen	Day 30	—N/a	Safe
Cianne Dominguez	25	Rizal	Kapamilya	Celebrities	TV personality	Day 1	Day 29	Evicted
Nicole Fortuna	21	Bohol	Kapuso	Regulars	Model	Day 1	Day 29	Evicted
Ethan Benares	20	Bacolod	Kapuso	Regulars	Athlete	Day 1	Day 22	Evicted
Calix Esguerra	18	Pampanga	Kapamilya	Regulars	Beauty king	Day 1	Day 22	Evicted

== Houseguests ==
Throughout the season, visitors known as houseguests enter the house to fulfill tasks assigned by Big Brother or as part of promotional activities for their work. For this season, the following individuals entered the house as houseguests:

- Robbie Jaworski (Days 1–29)
- Piolo Pascual, Iñigo Pascual, Darren Espanto, Kyle Echarri, Emilio Daez, and River Joseph (Day 4)
- Dingdong Dantes and Marian Rivera (Day 4)
- Mikee Cojuangco-Jaworski (Day 25)

== Episodes ==
=== Week 1 ===
No.	Title	Episode timeline	Timeslot	Reference	Original release date
1	"#PBBCollab3point0"	Day 1	Saturday; 6:00 P.M. (PHT)		October 24, 2026
The kick-off introduces the new house and the newest set of housemates, who are revealed to be a mix of regular and celebrity housemates. The Ka-Collab ni Kuya twist was also introduced. The two housemates chosen to be Big Brother's collaborators are yet to be revealed.
2	"#PBBCollab3FirstNight"	Day 1	Sunday; 4:55 P.M. (PHT)		October 25, 2026
The housemates spend their first night in the house. Robbie is revealed to be one of the two accomplices or "ka-collab" of Big Brother, that will initiate this season's Big Collab Charity Mission.: Task given: For their first task and first meal in the house, they had to transfer big coins representing the food that come from the housemates' homes using their feet altogether and stack the coins onto the podium in just 30 minutes.
3	"#PBBCollab3UnangUmaga"	Days 1-2	Monday; 9:35 P.M. (PHT)		October 26, 2026
The housemates spend their first morning in the house and converse with Big Brother for the first time. Mikee is revealed to be the Kapuso counterpart of Robbie in the "Ka-collab" task.: Task given: For this sharing task, the housemates will share stories connected to the things that is in their respective gift box, which came from their own homes.
4	"#PBB3ItemsFromHome"	Day 2	Tuesday; 9:35 P.M. (PHT)		October 27, 2026
The episode continues the sharing task from the previous episode. Later, Mikee realizes that Robbie is her “ka-collab” with Big Brother.
5	"#PBBCollab3SecretTask"	Days 2-3	Wednesday; 9:35 P.M. (PHT)		October 28, 2026
Big Brother introduces the first weekly task of the housemates for this season as Mikee and Robbie do their first secret task as Big Brother's collaborators, being informed by a task letter they had to find without being caught.: Weekly task given: For their first weekly task, called The Big Foundation, the housemates must build a tower four feet tall using wooden blocks to be placed on a narrow building area, and they will do it in pairs one at a time only. After building the tower, they must put the miniature version of the Pinoy Big Brother House at the top of the tower.; Secret task given: As part of their first weekly task, Mikee and Robbie were secretly tasked to build the miniature PBB House within 48 hours without the housemates noticing. If successful, they will be given ₱10,000 for the Big Collab Charity Mission.
6	"#PBBCollab3HBDShea"	Days 3-4	Thursday; 9:35 P.M. (PHT)		October 29, 2026
It features the birthday celebration of Shea, including the entry of Kapamilya male houseguests led by Piolo Pascual to greet the birthday girl.: Entry of houseguests: Piolo Pascual, Iñigo Pascual, Darren Espanto, and ex-housemates Kyle Echarri (Kumunity Season 10), Emilio Daez (Collab 1), and River Joseph (Collab 1) enters the house to greet Shea on her birthday.
7	"#PBBCollab3TrickorTreat"	Days 4-5	Friday; 9:35 P.M. (PHT)		October 30, 2026
It features a wacky and spooky task of the birthday girls, Shea and Lans, to transform as an "aswang" to scare their fellow housemates and for their halloween party as well.: Task given: For the food in their halloween party, Shea and Lans are tasked to transform into an "aswang" that is attached with each other, and their goal is to scare their housemates and make them scream. The task will determine the quantity of the food that they will be getting for the halloween party. If the scream meter reaches at below 6, they will have no food serving, if it gets at 7-10, they will get the food serving in half, but if it achieves the 11-12 mark of the meter, they will be getting the full food serving for the party. Aside from that, this task is also done for the other housemates to get additional blocks for their weekly task.
8	"#PBB3HalloweenBDay"	Days 5-6	Saturday; 6:15 P.M. (PHT)		October 31, 2026
It features the joint Halloween party and double birthday celebration of Lans and Shea. It also shows the progress of the secret task of the two "ka-collabs" of Big Brother, Mikee and Robbie.: Secret task result: The two "ka-collabs" of Big Brother successfully made the miniature Big Brother house within the timeframe of 48 hours that awards them the ₱10,000 for the Big Collab Charity Mission.

=== Week 2 ===
No.	Title	Episode timeline	Timeslot	Reference	Original release date
9	"#PBBCollab3FirstWTask"	Days 5-8	Sunday; 4:40 P.M. (PHT)		November 1, 2026
The episode featured the results of the housemates’ first weekly task and Lans’ birthday celebration. While searching for something around the house, Lans was surprised to hear a birthday message from her father. The episode also focused on conversations among the housemates about the budding connection between Jeo, Shea, and Gehlee.: Weekly task result: The housemates successfully completed their first weekly task by constructing a block tower exactly four feet tall, placing a miniature Pinoy Big Brother house on top, and keeping the structure standing for at least 100 seconds.
10	"#PBBCollab3DongYan"	Days 4-9	Monday; 9:35 P.M. (PHT)		November 2, 2026
The episode featured a special task centered on Dingdong Dantes and Marian Rivera's upcoming film, Remember. Following the task, the two entered the house and spoke with the housemates about the days they wanted to remember and forget. The episode also highlighted the tension sparked among Calix, Nathan, and Primo.: Task given: The housemates were divided into two groups and tasked with dressing up as and imitating characters portrayed by Marian and Dingdong in various films and television dramas shown on screen. Costumes were scattered throughout the house, and one participant from each group had to find the corresponding costume, put it on, and imitate the character. The first to complete the challenge earned one point. After eight matchups, the group with the most points won. At the end, the group consisting of Anthony, Ethan, Nathan, Primo, Shea, Gehlee, Cianne, and Lans won with six points, while the opposing group—Calix, Robbie, Raheel, Jeo, Nicole, Winwyn, Bela, and Mikee—finished with two points.; Entry of houseguests: Dingdong Dantes and Marian Rivera entered the house to promote their upcoming family drama movie, Remember.
11	"#PBBCollab3BoysIssue"	Days 9-10	Tuesday; 9:35 P.M. (PHT)		November 3, 2026
The episode focused on the growing misunderstanding between Primo, Calix, and Nathan. Calix shared with Jeo and Nathan that he felt left out as Primo appeared to spend more time with other housemates, prompting concerns about the changes in their friendship. When Primo learned about Calix's sentiments, he expressed disappointment that the concern had been discussed with other housemates before being brought directly to him. The two eventually discussed their feelings, with Calix explaining his sense of exclusion and Primo clarifying that he did not intend to treat anyone differently. Primo also spoke with Nathan about their friendship, acknowledging that they had become less close inside the house. With guidance from Jeo and Robbie, the housemates were encouraged to communicate openly, avoid overthinking, and allow their relationships to develop naturally.
12	"#PBBCollab3ScreenTest"	Day 10	Wednesday; 9:35 P.M. (PHT)		November 4, 2026
The housemates were introduced to their second weekly task, after which they selected a combination of romance, comedy, and action for their vertical drama. A screen test was subsequently held to determine the lead roles, with Primo and Bela announced as the leads to their surprise. However, the screen test later sparked an issue involving Calix and Gehlee after the former kissed the latter’s hand during their performance. The two later reconciled privately in the confession room. Big Brother subsequently called the male and female housemates separately to discuss the incident, emphasizing the importance of respecting personal boundaries.: Weekly task given: For their second weekly task, called Verti-Drama, the housemates were tasked with creating an original 25-minute live vertical drama, filmed in portrait format within a large vertical frame serving as their limited stage. All housemates were required to appear in the drama, including in three separate scenes where everyone had to be visible within the frame simultaneously. They were also required to reach a target number of views, which would be announced in the following days.
13	"#PBBCollab3PinoyRoots"	Days 11-12	Thursday; 9:35 P.M. (PHT)		November 5, 2026
The episode featured a special task involving two housemates born and raised outside the Philippines: Anthony, who was raised in the United States, and Nicole, who was raised in the United Kingdom. Big Brother challenged them to learn about their roots and the Filipino language through a game of Bring Me. At the end of the game, both housemates earned six points. They each scored five points in the first ten matchups before tying by correctly identifying the final item, tasa (mug). As a reward, they received a Filipino dictionary. Meanwhile, the episode also revealed a new twist involving Big Brother’s collaborators, Robbie and Mikee, who were informed that two additional housemates would join their secret challenge. They were informed that they would be assigned another secret task. They were also told that one Kapamilya and one Kapuso housemate could join their secret tasks, and they were allowed to choose their recruits.: Task given: In the game, titled Bring Me, Big Brother displays various Filipino words on the plasma TV, with the corresponding items located around the house. The first housemate to retrieve the correct item wins the match, while the housemate with the most points at the end of the game receives a prize.; Secret task given: As their second secret task as Ka-Collab ni Kuya, Robbie and Mikee, along with their recruits Primo and Lans, were tasked with getting Anthony and Nicole to sing “Pinoy Ako” without the other housemates noticing. If successful, they would double their initial prize money to ₱20,000 for the Big Collab Charity Mission.
14	"#PBBCollab3PinoyAko"	Day 13	Friday; 9:35 P.M. (PHT)		November 6, 2026
The episode first focused on the progress of the second secret task of Ka-Collab ni Kuya, followed by Shea, Nicole, Bela, and Mikee reflecting on their relationships with their mothers, as well as Jeo and Gehlee growing closer while studying Filipino. The episode ends with the “Filipi-Know Quiz Bee,” where Anthony and Nicole were tested on their translation, lyrics recall, and comprehension of the song’s message. During the episode’s introduction, host Robi Domingo revealed that the housemates needed to garner at least three million accumulated views to pass their second weekly task, with the viewing period running from Saturday, November 7 (Day 15), at 7:15 p.m. to Sunday, November 8 (Day 16), at 12 noon, through Pinoy Big Brother’s social media accounts. And also the result of the weekly task will be revealed in a live episode on Sunday.: Challenge given: Titled Filipi-Know Quiz Bee, Anthony and Nicole must answer ten questions assessing their translation, pronunciation, and comprehension of the song “Pinoy Ako.” The quiz consists of three parts: translating selected lyrics into English, completing lines from the song with the correct words, and explaining the song’s message. Each correct answer is worth ₱1,000 for the Big Collab Charity Mission.
15	"#PBBCollab3VertiDrama"	Days 11-14	Saturday; 6:15 P.M. (PHT)		November 7, 2026
The episode continued the Filipi-Know Quiz Bee challenge, in which Anthony answered eight out of ten questions correctly, while Nicole scored seven. Their results added ₱15,000 to the Big Charity Collab Mission, bringing its total to ₱25,000. Nicole shared a story about her brother, who has autism, while Anthony spoke about his grandparents. The episode also featured a dry run of the housemates’ vertical drama, during which weekly task leaders Calix and Winwyn disagreed over the lead roles; the housemates’ vertical drama subsequently premiered.

=== Week 3 ===
No.	Title	Episode timeline	Timeslot	Reference	Original release date
16	"#PBBCollab3FirstNomi"	Days 14-16	Sunday; 4:55 P.M. (PHT)		November 8, 2026
The episode marked the return of a live Sunday afternoon broadcast after a lengthy hiatus. It featured the results of the housemates’ second weekly task, the first Ligtask challenge, and a major revelation that Robbie was a celebrity houseguest rather than an official housemate. It also revealed the season’s first set of nominees for eviction: Ethan, Mikee, and Nicole from the Kapuso group, and Calix, Nathan, and Primo from the Kapamilya group.: Weekly task result: Big Brother announced that the housemates had achieved an average of 4,372,285 views across all four social media platforms, thereby successfully completing their second weekly task.; Ligtask challenge given and result: For their first Ligtask challenge, the housemates were tasked with balancing on a dome-shaped ball while building a tower using four red cups, placing them alternately. Once the cups were stacked, the balancer had to be placed atop the podium. If the cups were knocked over or fell, the housemates could obtain new cups and continue stacking. The fastest Kapuso and Kapamilya housemates would earn immunity and avoid nomination. Shea recorded the fastest time on the Kapamilya side at 1 minute and 25 seconds, while Raheel was the fastest on the Kapuso side, completing the challenge in 31 seconds.; Nomination process: See Round #1 of nomination history.
17	"#PBBCollab3FirstNomiBlues"	Days 15-16	Monday; 9:35 P.M. (PHT)		November 9, 2026
Following the first nomination, the housemates discussed their reasons for nominating one another, with several reassuring those who received votes that the decisions were not personal. Nathan opened up to Big Brother about his family's financial struggles and difficult childhood, explaining how he learned to remain cheerful despite their hardships. Meanwhile, Robbie comforted Primo, who shared his struggles with social interactions and fear of abandonment. Primo and Mikee also addressed a misunderstanding concerning his perceived negativity toward her.
18	"#PBB3IlawNgTahanan"	Day 17	Tuesday; 9:35 P.M. (PHT)		November 10, 2026
The housemates decorated their Christmas tree and received framed photographs of their mothers, prompting emotional reflections on their families and personal relationships. Robbie secretly selected two housemates, one Kapuso and one Kapamilya, to receive an opportunity to give their mothers a special gift as part of his secret mission. Meanwhile, the housemates shared their experiences and appreciation for their mothers, while Big Brother acknowledged the housemates' violations of house rules.: Secret task given: Robbie was tasked by Big Brother to identify one Kapuso and one Kapamilya housemate whom he believed deserved the opportunity to give a special gift to their mothers. To accomplish the mission, he had to learn about each housemate's relationship with their mother and understand their personal stories without revealing the purpose of his inquiries.
19	"#PBBCollab3Violations"	Days 17-18	Wednesday; 9:35 P.M. (PHT)		November 11, 2026
The housemates found a rule book listing their violations during their stay. Big Brother instructed them to read their violations aloud, except Anthony and Lans, who had none. Those with violations wore oversized book costumes, with Anthony and Lans assisting them. Big Brother informed Primo of his major violation for discussing nominations. Later, seven housemates were to be acquitted, but disagreement arose when the males suggested freeing the females. Lacking consensus, the decision fell to Anthony and Lans, who decided to settle it via random draw. The episode ended with a preview of a major violation involving code names among the boys, set to be revealed next episode.
20	"#PBBCollab3HouseRules"	Day 18	Thursday; 9:35 P.M. (PHT)		November 12, 2026
The episode featured the conclusion of the housemates' punishments, with the seven female violators being released first after the boys agreed to let them finish early, while the remaining male housemates continued their punishment. Mikee became emotional after recalling the online bashing she experienced during the pandemic, which resurfaced feelings of being a burden when Anthony and Lans assisted the others. She eventually opened up to her fellow housemates, who reassured her and encouraged her to accept help from others. Meanwhile, Big Brother addressed the boys' use of the code name "dinosaur" and reminded them to avoid turning their interactions with female housemates into competitions. The episode also revealed the third weekly task, "Solar Circle," which required the housemates to illuminate eight sets of Christmas lights surrounding their Christmas tree.
21	"#PBBCollab3ChargeUp"	Days 19-20	Friday; 9:35 P.M. (PHT)		November 13, 2026
The housemates began their third weekly task, “Solar Circle,” which required them to assemble eight giant puzzle pieces into a sun formation and maintain their alignment for three hours to illuminate each set of Christmas lights. Despite initial difficulties and disagreements, the housemates gradually improved their coordination and successfully illuminated their first set of lights. Meanwhile, Shea confided in the girls about feeling ignored by Jeo, prompting Cianne to speak with him. Jeo explained that he had distanced himself to avoid having his friendly gestures misinterpreted as romantic interest, as he considered his relationships with the housemates purely platonic. Big Brother reminded him to maintain honest and respectful friendships without unnecessarily distancing himself from others. The episode also revealed Robbie’s secret to Nathan and Shea: he was a houseguest, not an official housemate, and had chosen them as the people he considered like siblings.: Weekly task given: For their third weekly task, called Solar Circle, the housemates must light the Christmas lights by assembling eight giant puzzle pieces into the shape of a sun. Using a stick, they had to hold the pieces close together and position them correctly. The lights would charge when the black border remained within the eye, as indicated by the clock, but charging would stop if the border moved beyond it. Each set of Christmas lights required three hours to fully charge.
22	"#PBBCollab3FirstEviction"	Days 20-22	Saturday; 6:15 P.M. (PHT)		November 14, 2026
The first live eviction night took place. Before the announcement, the episode continued to show the emotional dynamics between Jeo and Shea, highlighting Shea's feelings of confusion and hurt due to Jeo’s avoidance. She shared her concerns with Mikee and later with Big Brother, who encouraged her to give Jeo space for emotional processing. The episode also included the preparation for the first live eviction, revealing Robbie Jaworski as a special guest and engaging in the Big Collab Charity Mission. Ultimately, Calix was evicted first among the Kapamilya, with Ethan being the first Kapuso evicted, while Primo, Nathan, Mikee, and Nicole were declared safe. Calix and Ethan reflected on their experiences upon reuniting with their loved ones.: Eviction result: During the eviction ceremony, Primo and Nathan were declared safe, leaving Calix as the first Kapamilya housemate evicted with 1.6% of the votes. Among the Kapuso nominees, Mikee and Nicole were saved, while Ethan became the first Kapuso housemate evicted after receiving 28.7% of the votes.

=== Week 4 ===
No.	Title	Episode timeline	Timeslot	Reference	Original release date
23	"#PBBCollab3SecondNomi"	Days 21-23	Sunday; 4:55 P.M. (PHT)		November 15, 2026
Following the first live eviction, the housemates continued their third weekly task and LigTask challenges, with Jeo and Lans winning their respective matchups with 325 and 335 points. The episode then featured the second live nominations show, during which Nicole and Bela were named Kapuso nominees, while Nathan and Primo became Kapamilya nominees. Raheel and Cianne were also nominated, completing the lists of three nominees for each team. However, the Ligtask winners were given the opportunity to save two housemates each because of tied nomination scores. Lans saved Anthony and Mikee, who were tied with Nicole for third place with two points each, while Jeo saved Gehlee and Shea, who were among four Kapamilya housemates tied for second and third place with two points each. The episode also introduced four new housemates: Daniela and Lorelaine for Team Kapamilya, and Allen and Ronnie for Team Kapuso.: Weekly task result: The Christmas bells rang just before the 13-hour mark, signaling the end of the weekly task. The housemates managed to last 12 hours, 50 minutes, and 18 seconds, lighting only four Christmas lights—four short of the required eight. As a result, they failed the weekly task.; Ligtask given and result: For their second Ligtask challenge, each housemate was tasked with transferring blocks worth 5, 10, 15, and 20 points to a white platform while keeping a balloon airborne using only their hands. They were given two minutes to complete the challenge, which would immediately end if the balloon fell to the floor. The housemate who accumulated the highest total points would win the challenge and earn immunity from nomination. Jeo of Kapamilya and Lans of Kapuso won their respective matchups, scoring 325 and 335 points, respectively.; Nomination process: See Round #2 of nomination history.
24	"#PBBCollab3Hotel"	Day 23	Monday; 9:35 P.M. (PHT)		November 16, 2026
The episode opened with the housemates discussing the bracelets Jeo had given to some of the female housemates, including Shea, who shared how easily she obtained hers by asking him directly. Big Brother then assigned Robbie a new role as hotel manager, with the other housemates serving as hotel staff. The group was tasked with operating a hotel using limited resources, requiring them to organize themselves into departments such as housekeeping, food and beverage, front desk, and maintenance. Robbie delegated responsibilities according to the housemates’ strengths and supervised their preparations for incoming VIP guests. The housekeeping team was given only an hour to clean and organize a particularly messy suite, while the kitchen staff prepared food despite their limited ingredients. After completing their preparations, the housemates welcomed the four new housemates as their first hotel guests. The newcomers were introduced to the Big Brother house and shared their expectations of getting to know their fellow housemates and experiencing life inside the house.: Task given: Robbie, as the hotel manager, and the other housemates, as hotel staff, were tasked with cleaning the disorganized and messy penthouse suite within one hour. They were required to stop cleaning once the time limit elapsed, regardless of whether they had finished the task.
25	"#PBBCollab3VIPGuests"	Day 24	Tuesday; 9:35 P.M. (PHT)		November 17, 2026
The episode featured the continuation of Robbie’s hotel-manager task, as the housemates completed their preparations to accommodate the four new housemates as VIP guests. The hotel staff finalized the penthouse suite, arranged the dining area, and prepared meals using their limited ingredients. Robbie and the other servers welcomed Allen, Ronnie, Daniela, and Lorelaine, assisted them with their luggage, introduced the facilities, and served their requested meals. While the new housemates enjoyed their stay, the experience became emotional for some of the original housemates, particularly Winwyn, who struggled to see the newcomers receiving food and comfortable accommodations while the rest of the group remained in the main house. She expressed how deeply attached she had become to her fellow housemates and how she would rather share their hardships than be separated from them. Robbie and the others comforted her, acknowledging the strong bonds they had formed during their time together. The episode ended with the housemates preparing for the following day and welcoming the new arrivals into their growing household.
26	"#PBBCollab3CheckOut"	Days 24-25	Wednesday; 9:35 P.M. (PHT)		November 18, 2026
The episode featured the conclusion of Robbie’s hotel-manager task, as the housemates continued serving breakfast and lunch to the four new housemates acting as VIP guests. After completing their stay, the guests evaluated the hotel staff’s performance and praised their professionalism, hospitality, and positive energy. The four newcomers were then officially introduced as housemates and welcomed into the Big Brother house, marking the beginning of their adjustment to the group’s established dynamics. The original housemates expressed mixed emotions about the arrivals, with some excited to meet them while others worried about how their presence would change existing relationships. The new housemates began getting acquainted with everyone and sharing personal stories, interests, and experiences. Meanwhile, Allen and Ronnie discussed their competitive personalities and readiness to participate in upcoming tasks. The episode concluded with Robbie’s mother, Mikee Cojuangco, making a special request for the VIP guests: to arrange a basketball game featuring the housemates as players, which she could watch.
27	"#PBBCollab3VVIPMom"	Day 25	Thursday; 9:35 P.M. (PHT)		November 19, 2026
The episode centered on Robbie’s special VIP guest request, which involved arranging a surprise visit from his mother, Mikee Cojuangco. The housemates prepared a welcoming hotel experience and dinner for her, with Robbie unaware that his mother was the guest he would be accommodating. During their emotional reunion, Mikee expressed how proud she and the rest of their family were of Robbie, while he shared how much he missed them and appreciated the opportunity to see his mother inside the house. She also met the other housemates, whom Robbie had come to regard as his second family. The visit concluded with a basketball game featuring the housemates as players, fulfilling her special request. Mikee praised the group for their hospitality and thanked them for making Robbie feel welcomed and supported.: Entry of houseguest: Robbie's Mother, Mikee Cojuangco-Jaworski entered the house.
28	"#PBBCollab3HBDLorelaine"	Days 26-27	Friday; 9:35 P.M. (PHT)		November 20, 2026
The episode focused on Lorelaine’s birthday celebration and her special task from Big Brother. She was challenged to memorize the housemates’ choreography for “Pinoy Ako” and secretly create her own interpretation without being noticed. After successfully performing both the original choreography and her own dance routine, Lorelaine received a surprise video greeting from her four-year-old son, Aifen, instead of the photograph she had initially requested. She became emotional as she shared her experiences as a single mother, including the challenges she faced raising Aifen after his father lost contact with them. She expressed her wish for her son to remain healthy and for her to become successful so she could provide him with a better life. As an additional birthday gift, Big Brother reopened the penthouse and allowed her to invite Bela for a private celebration, complete with food and drinks. The gathering eventually became a girls’ night as other female housemates were secretly invited to join them. During their conversations, Lorelaine opened up about motherhood and her personal struggles, earning encouragement and admiration from her fellow housemates. Meanwhile, the boys grew suspicious of the girls’ activities, while the birthday celebration continued in the penthouse.: Secret task given: Lorelaine was tasked with secretly learning the Pinoy Ako dance choreographed by the housemates while incorporating her own dance steps, without being noticed by the others. If successful, she would receive a birthday reward inside the house, later revealed to include a surprise video message and a drinking session.
29	"#PBBCollab3SecondEviction"	Days 27-29	Saturday; 6:15 P.M. (PHT)		November 21, 2026
The episode featured the conclusion of Lorelaine’s birthday celebration, followed by the second live eviction night. After the girls’ night at the penthouse, Bela admitted feeling embarrassed about drinking too much, while her fellow housemates helped her recover. Meanwhile, Robbie prepared to say goodbye to the housemates by organizing a private bonding session with the six nominees. They shared their favorite memories, personal realizations, and heartfelt messages before Robbie’s departure. During the live show, Big Brother and the production teams announced the immediate suspension of all Pinoy Big Brother: Collab 3.0 livestreams beginning November 21, 2026, citing the misuse of livestream footage to spread misleading, malicious, and potentially defamatory content and the need to protect the housemates and their families from cyberbullying and harassment. This was the first time that the livestream was shut down since 737. The program also introduced iWant PBB Extra, offering more than five hours of on-demand content daily. Robbie subsequently completed his special celebrity houseguest mission, raising a total of ₱95,000 for the Big Collab Charity Mission, before officially leaving the house. The eviction results were then revealed; Cianne and Nicole were named that night's evictees. The evictees later reunited with their loved ones outside the house and reflected on the friendships and lessons they gained during their four-week stay. The episode concluded with the announcement that new housemates would be entering the house and that further details about the next nomination round would be revealed the following day.: Eviction result: During the eviction ceremony, Primo and Nathan were declared safe, leaving Cianne as the second Kapamilya housemate evicted with 3.98% of the votes. Among the Kapuso nominees, Bela and Raheel were saved, while Nicole became the second Kapuso housemate evicted after receiving 23.92% of the votes.

=== Week 5 ===
No.	Title	Episode timeline	Timeslot	Reference	Original release date
30	"#PBBCollab3NewHMs"	Days 27-30	Sunday; 4:55 P.M. (PHT)		November 22, 2026
The episode showed the housemates' weekly task with Allen and Shea as the task leaders. Big Brother informed Robbie that every twenty star ratings earned is equivalent to Php 10,000 for the Big Collab Charity Mission. By passing the weekly task, he earned Php 40,000 for a total of Php 95,000. The episode then showed scenes from eviction day and introduced the five new housemates.: Weekly task given and result: For their fourth weekly task titled "Hotel ni Kuya," housemates completed an obstacle course while balancing water bottles on trays. After completing the obstacle course, they had to catch an additional bottle thrown by hotel manager Robbie and deposit all bottles at the kitchen counter. If a bottle fell, they had to return to the start. Divided into three groups, they faced different difficulties: Easy (one bottle), Average (two bottles), and Hard (three bottles). Each successfully placed bottle earned one star, with a goal of at least 80 star ratings to win the task. At the end of the weekly task, the three groups of housemates accumulated a total of 90 star ratings, successfully completing the challenge.
31	"#PBBCollab3"	Day 30	Monday; 9:35 P.M. (PHT)	TBA	November 23, 2026
32	"#PBBCollab3"	Day 31	Tuesday; 9:35 P.M. (PHT)	TBA	November 24, 2026
33	"#PBBCollab3"	Days 31-32	Wednesday; 9:35 P.M. (PHT)	TBA	November 25, 2026
34	"#PBBCollab3"	Day 32	Thursday; 9:35 P.M. (PHT)	TBA	November 26, 2026
35	"#PBBCollab3"	Day 33	Friday; 9:35 P.M. (PHT)	TBA	November 27, 2026
36	"#PBBCollab3"	Days 34-35	Saturday; 6:15 P.M. (PHT)	TBA	November 28, 2026

== Nomination history ==
Legend and color key

Kapuso housemate
Kapamilya housemate
Immune or Exempt
Saved via Ligtask

Pinoy Big Brother: Collab 3.0 nomination history
	#1	#2	#3	#4	#5	#6	#7	#8	#9	#10	Nominations received
Eviction day and date	Day 22 November 14	Day 29 November 21									Nominations received
Nomination day and date	Day 16; November 8	Day 23; November 15									Nominations received
Allen	Not in the House (Days 1–22)										0
Anthony	Calix; Ethan	Mikee; Nathan									3
Bela	Ethan; Calix	Raheel; Primo									5
Daniela	Not in the House (Days 1–22)										0
Eugene	Not in the House (Days 1–29)										0
Gehlee	Primo; Anthony	Primo; Raheel									2
Jeo	Nathan; Ethan	Primo; Bela									0
Lans	Calix; Ethan	Shea; Raheel									0
Lexi	Not in the House (Days 1–29)										0
Lorelaine	Not in the House (Days 1–22)										0
Mikee	Primo; Ethan	Gehlee; Anthony									3
Nathan	Calix; Ethan	Bela; Cianne									4
Primo	Calix; Mikee	Raheel; Cianne									23
Race	Not in the House (Days 1–29)										0
Raheel	Primo; Nicole	Primo; Bela									8
Ronnie	Not in the House (Days 1–22)										0
Shea	Calix; Ethan	Primo; Bela									2
Victoria	Not in the House (Days 1–29)										0
Winwyn	Calix; Nicole	Primo; Anthony									0
Yza	Not in the House (Days 1–29)										0
Nicole	Primo; Ethan	Raheel; Nathan	Evicted (Day 29)								5
Cianne	Primo; Ethan	Nicole; Primo	Evicted (Day 29)								2
Ethan	Calix; Nicole	Evicted (Day 22)									12
Calix	Ethan; Primo	Evicted (Day 22)									15
Ligtask winners	Raheel Shea	Lans Jeo									
Up for eviction	~~Anthony~~ (Note: As there was a tie in the nominations, a Ligtask winner saved this housemate.); Ethan; Mikee; Nicole Calix; Nathan; Primo	~~Anthony~~; Bela; ~~Mikee~~; Nicole; Raheel Cianne; ~~Gehlee~~; Nathan; Primo; ~~Shea~~									
Saved from eviction	Mikee; 40.7% Nicole; 30.6% Nathan; 54.6% Primo; 43.8%	Raheel; 39.65% Bela; 36.43% Nathan; 54.93% Primo; 41.08%									
Evicted	Ethan; 28.7% Calix; 1.6%	Nicole; 23.92% Cianne; 3.98%									
Ref.											

== Production ==
=== Development ===
On August 10, 2026, Pinoy Big Brother published a social media post featuring a hand making the "OK" gesture, with the show's eye logo within the circle formed by the fingers. In the days leading up to the announcement, the show released additional posts featuring former housemates making the same gesture. On August 14, hosts Bianca Gonzalez, Gabbi Garcia, and Kim Chiu, together with former housemates, appeared on the noontime variety show It's Showtime to announce the season. Auditions opened that evening following an announcement on 24 Oras, and remained open until August 31, to applicants aged 18 to 35.

On October 3, the show confirmed that Gonzalez, Garcia, Domingo, Cantiveros, Dee, and Ilacad would reprise their roles as hosts, while withholding the identity of the new host with the intials "M.S.". Chiu ultimately did not return for the season after serving as a presenter since Otso. Former Collab 1 housemate Michael Sager was revealed to be the show's newest host on October 5.

=== Theme songs ===
The original version of "Pinoy Ako" by Orange and Lemons returned as the main soundtrack for this season. Rico Blanco's version titled "Pinoy Tayo" is used for the OnlineVerse gaps. The eviction song for this season is "Ako'y Mahalaga", written and sung by Otso ex-housemate Jem Macatuno, marking his second time producing an eviction theme for the show as after "Bagong Simula" in Connect.

=== House ===
Collab 3.0 featured a new house for the first time in the show's history, following the demolition of the former house at #18 Eugenio Lopez Drive, Barangay South Triangle in Diliman, Quezon City, upon the expiration of show's lease on the property. The grounds had already been sold before the first two "collab" seasons but was leased to the production team to accommodate those seasons. By February 2026, the showrunners have been exploring new options for the house's new location.

On October 20, the show unveiled the house's new façade at the Gina Lopez Building near the old location, with the house proper located at the nearby ELJ Communications Center.

== Release ==
=== Broadcast ===
The season airs on GMA Network daily. Episodes are also broadcast and streamed simultaneously via Kapuso Stream, ABS-CBN Entertainment YouTube channel and iWant, while Kapamilya Online Live streams it on a delayed basis.

For this season, a daily 45-minute highlights show aired on Mondays through Fridays, with a one-hour live eviction show on Saturdays and live nominations show revealed on Sundays.

While the companion show Updates did not continue, The OnlineVerse returned with Ilacad and Sager as hosts, streaming every Saturday as a pre-show on the show's YouTube channel, Kapuso Stream, and the ABS-CBN Entertainment YouTube channel, with broadcasts timed to coincide with the commercial breaks of the primetime episode. An extended after-show version streams at the show's YouTube channel. After the livestreams were discontinued on November 21, the series debuted a new companion show, iWant PBB Extra, on iWant starting November 23. The program will offer five hours of on-demand content.

=== Livestream ===
The season’s “all-access” livestreams were available on iWant through three feeds: the main livestream, which covers the rest of the house; the dining area; and the external den. The dining area and external den livestreams are exclusively available to iWant Premium subscribers. On November 21, the showrunners discontinued the livestreams, citing misuses of the content they claimed to have maligned and instigated hate against the contestants.

== Reception ==
=== Ratings ===
According to AGB Nielsen Philippines' Nationwide Urban Television Audience Measurement People in television homes, the pilot episode of Pinoy Big Brother: Collab 3.0 earned a 6.6% rating.

=== Critical reception ===
On November 12, 2026, the Movie and Television Review and Classification Board (MTRCB) reported receiving over a hundred complaints linked to the series, which grew to 1,300 a week later. MTRCB Chair and Chief Executive Officer Lala Sotto described the response as unparalleled by any program that aired during her tenure and hoped that the show's management will be more mindful of their audience.

Media outlets and organizations attributed several incidents to the response. In Week 3, Gabriela Women's Party expressed concern over the dynamics among the male housemates in which they appeared to treat their interactions with Dangca as a competition, warning how the housemates' behavior could normalize the treatment of women as objects men compete over, urging the management to address the issue with the housemates involved. The following week, the National Council on Disability Affairs, who were joined by the Department of Social Welfare and Development, urged the showrunners to promote "greater disability sensitivity" after Quintos and Dominguez attracted online attention after allegedly mocking persons with disabilities in two instances.

ABS-CBN denied receiving a formal notice from the MTRCB, but vowed to commit to self-regulation and cooperation if summoned by the board.

Preceded by Pinoy Big Brother: Celebrity Collab Edition 2.0	Pinoy Big Brother: Collab 3.0; October 24, 2026 – present	Most recent
