= Goshen Land Capital =

Goshen Land Capital is a family-owned real estate company in Northern Luzon, Philippines.

== History ==
Goshen Land Capital was established in 2007 in Baguio, Philippines by Alexander Bangsoy, who started the company to manage the real estate holdings of his company, TBF Realty.

In 2011 the company was in the news because its student condominium development lessened the shortage of housing for Baguio's many students.

By 2010 the company had completed nine development projects in Baguio and a number of communities in Northern Luzon.

In 2013 Goshen Land was working in 23 more communities. It was accorded the developer of the year award for four consecutive years by the Midland Courier newspaper.

In 2015 Premiere Horizon bought a 55% interest in Goshen Land At the time of purchase, Goshen Land Capital had assets of about P1.6 billion and was involved in 18 development projects.

== Community involvement ==
Through its organization Goshen Land Caring Hands, the company helps young people from the local football community in Baguio and provides scholarships and football coaching through the Cordillera Goshen Land Football Club. Goshen Land sponsors local tournaments and organizes football clinics.

== Selected projects ==
- Summerfields: A community of residential homes located at Dreamland, Pinget, Baguio. The theme of the houses was influenced by the architecture of San Francisco.

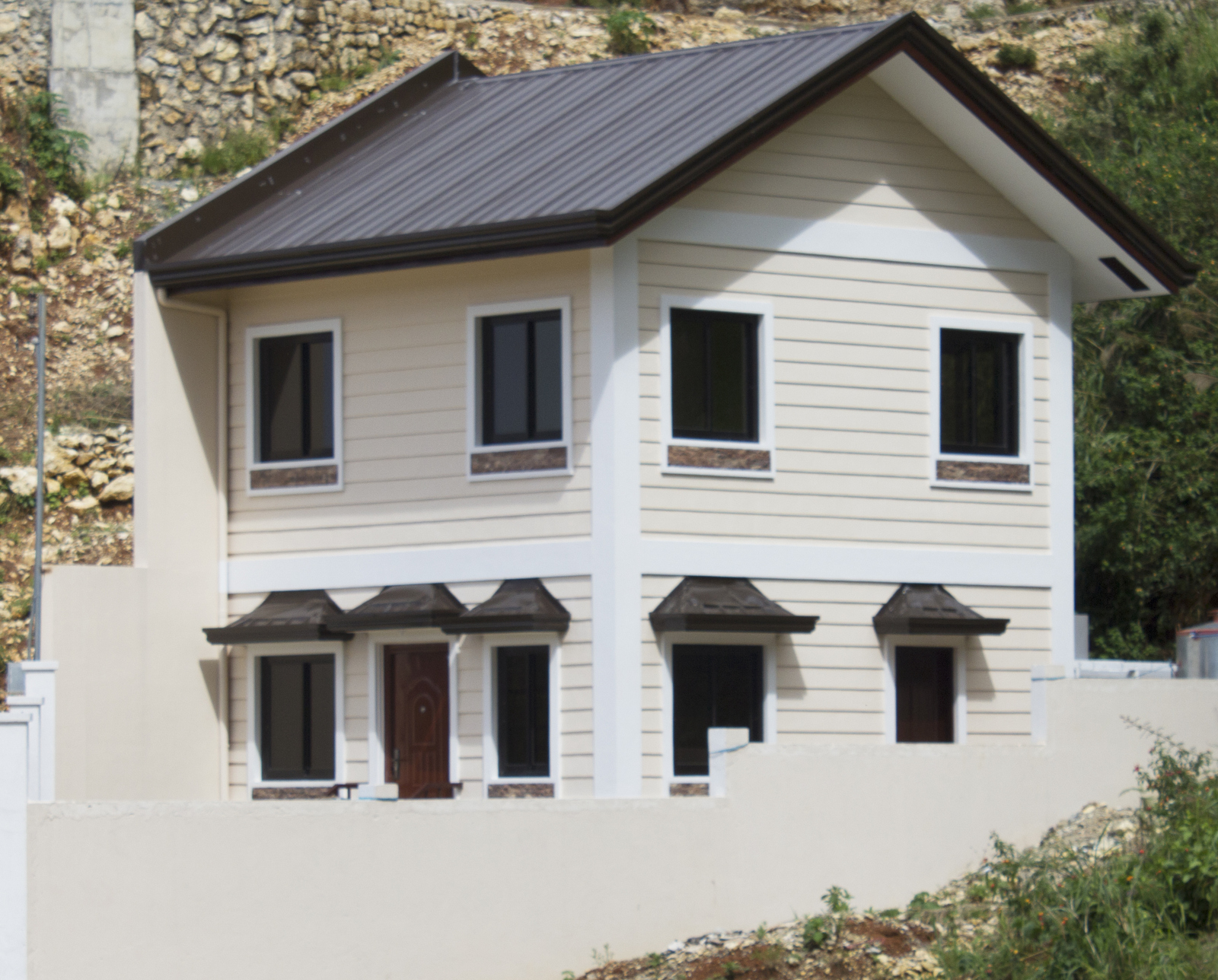
one of the homes in summerfields

- Blue Ridge Mountains: A planned community located in the boundary between Baguio and La Trinidad, Benguet. (not built yet)
- Rock Valley: Homes located in Dontogan, Baguio.
- The Courtyards: Condominiums in Leonila Hill, Baguio.
- Goshen Land Towers formerly known as Melbourne Towers: The property features commercial and residential units located near Session Road, Baguio.
- North Cambridge Condominiums: A student condominium complex which includes three buildings: Wharton, Princeton and Harvard. It is located beside the Maryheights campus of Saint Louis University.
- Burnham Hill: Condominium units that can be leased out as transient homes near Burnham Park, Baguio.
- Central Apartments: Condominium units located at Trancoville, Baguio.
