= Y Speak =

- Title card in 2026
- Genre: Talk show Debate
- Created by: ABS-CBN Corporation
- Developed by: ABS-CBN News and Current Affairs; Caritas Philippines (2026)
- Presented by: Elijah Canlas; Robbie Jaworski; Aya Fernandez; River Joseph; KD Estrada; Ralph de Leon; Bianca Gonzalez; Ryan Agoncillo; Karen Davila
- Opening theme: "Saranggola" by Ben&Ben (2026)
- Country of origin: Philippines
- Original language: Filipino
- No. of seasons: 1
- No. of episodes: 10

Production
- Executive producers: Karen Almeida-Pedrealba; Bianca Gonzales
- Camera setup: Multiple-camera setup

Original release
- Network: ABS-CBN
- Release: September 8, 2004 – 2005
- Network: Studio 23
- Release: 2005 – September 11, 2010
- Network: Kapamilya Channel; All TV (via ABS-CBN sa All TV 2 block)
- Release: May 9 – October 24, 2026

Y Speak, currently known on-air as Y Speak 2.0, is a Philippine television public affairs debate show broadcast by ABS-CBN, Studio 23, Kapamilya Channel and All TV 2. Originally hosted by Ryan Agoncillo and Karen Davila, it aired from September 8, 2004 to September 11, 2010. The show returned from May 9 to October 24, 2026. Elijah Canlas, Robbie Jaworski, KD Estrada, River Joseph, Ralph de Leon and Aya Fernandez serve as the final hosts.

To date, it is one of Studio 23's most awarded local shows. Aside from the CMMA victory as Best TV Talk Show, it is also a recipient of the UST Students' Choice Award for Best Public Affairs Talk Show, the Gandingan (UPLB Students' Choice Award) for Best Panel Discussion Show, the Anak TV Seal, and endorsements from the Department of Education and the National Youth Commission.

== Format ==
Featuring hosts Agoncillo, Davila, and Gonzalez; later Estrada, Canlas, Fernandez, de Leon, and Joseph; the youth debate about the current and relevant issues of the day. The debate is adjudicated by Father Carmelo "Tito" Caluag, SJ and a pair of celebrity guest judges in front of a weekly live audience from different schools. By Season 4, Y Speak was reformatted as an all-English youth-oriented documentary program with occasional debates.

== History ==
Title card used from 2005 to 2010

Y Speak was originally aired on ABS-CBN, hosted by Agoncillo and Davila. Gonzalez also started out as a segment host. Father Tito Caluag was also a part of the show as its resident judge. Its first season premiered on September 8, 2004 with guest judges Senator Mar Roxas and Bernadette Sembrano. Initially, it aired on Wednesday nights after Special Assignment. The show later moved to Studio 23 and a Saturday timeslot. By Season 4, Y Speak was reformatted as an all-English youth-oriented documentary program with occasional debates. Gonzalez was also made executive producer.

A reboot was announced in 2026 in partnership with Caritas Philippines, as confirmed by its executive director Tito Caluag, and is currently airing as Y Speak 2.0.

On May 30, 2026, Y Speak 2.0 was removed from All TV's lineup due to an episode of the show featuring former ABS-CBN journalist Christian Esguerra. The episode was also removed from ABS-CBN's digital platforms.

== Hosts ==
=== Final hosts ===
- Aya Fernandez (2026)
- Elijah Canlas (2026)
- KD Estrada (2026)
- Ralph de Leon (2026)
- River Joseph (2026)
- Robbie Jaworski (2026)

=== Y Speak Squad ===
- Mo Twister
- Vince Liwanag
- Patricia Evangelista
- Sam Concepcion
- JC Cuadrado
- Ricci Chan
- Mikee Lee
- Bettina Carlos
- Bam Aquino
- Enchong Dee
- Kim Atienza
- Atom Araullo
- Jaja Bolivar

=== Former hosts ===
- Bianca Gonzalez (2004–2010)
- Karen Davila (2004)
- Ryan Agoncillo (2004–2006)

=== Guest hosts ===
- Jake Cuenca
- Maja Salvador
- Gerald Anderson
- Billy Crawford
- Pinky Webb (fill-in host for Davila)

Chris Tiu was also offered to be one of the hosts on the show but turned down the offer.

== Awards and recognitions ==
- Winner, Best Public Affairs Program - PMPC Star Awards for Television 2007, 2009-2010
- Winner, Ryan Agoncillo, Best Public Affairs Program Host - KBP Golden Dove Awards 2005
- Winner, Ryan Agoncillo, Outstanding TV Host - Gawad Amerika Awards 2006
- Winner, Best TV Talk Show - Catholic Mass Media Awards 2006
- Winner, Best Public Affairs Talk Show - UST Students Choice Awards 2006
- Winner, Best Public Affairs Talk Show - UST Students Choice Awards 2008
- Winner, Best Public Affairs Program - UST Students Choice Awards 2009
- Winner, Best Panel Discussion Show - The Gandingan UPLB Students Choice Awards
- Winner, Anak TV Seal Awards (2005-2010)
- Winner, Best Public Affairs Program - 6th Gawad Tanglaw Awards
- Winner, Best Educational TV Program - 9th Gawad Tanglaw Awards
- Winner, Best Public Affairs Program - KBP Golden Dove Awards 2010
- Special Award for Promoting Education - 2009 MTRCB TV Awards
- Special Award - Department Of Education
- Special Award - National Youth Commission
- Nominee, Best Celebrity Talk Show - PMPC Star Awards for Television (2004-2006)
- Nominee, Best Public Affairs Program - PMPC Star Awards for Television 2008
- Nominee, Best Public Affairs Program - KBP Golden Dove Awards (2004-2006)
- Nominee, Bianca Gonzalez, Best Public Affairs Program Host - KBP Golden Dove Awards 2005
- Nominee, Bianca Gonzalez & Atom Araullo, Best Public Affairs Program Host - PMPC Star Awards for Television 2008
- Nominee, Bianca Gonzalez, Best Public Affairs Program Host - PMPC Star Awards for Television 2010
- Nominee, Bianca Gonzalez, Kim Atienza, and Sam Concepcion, Best Public Affairs Program Host - PMPC Star Awards for Television 2007
