= Calix Esguerra =

Filipino model and male pageant titleholder

- Born: Calix Kayden D. Esguerra; November 24, 2007 (age 18); Angeles City, Philippines
- Education: Far Eastern University Pampanga
- Height: 1.88 m (6 ft 2 in)
- Beauty pageant titleholder
- Title: Mister Teen of the Universe Philippines 2025

Calix Kayden D. Esguerra (born November 24, 2007) is a Filipino model, male pageant titleholder and Pinoy Big Brother: Collab 3.0 housemate.

He was previously won as Mister Teen of the Universe 2025 at the Misters of Filipinas 2025 pageant.

He is currently one of the Pinoy Big Brother: Collab 3.0 housemates.

== Filmography ==
=== Television ===
Year	Title	Role	Ref.
2025	Family Feud Philippines	Himself (Guest)	
2025	TiktoClock	Himself (Guest)	
2026	Project Loki	Charles Melton	
2026	Pinoy Big Brother: Collab 3.0	Himself (Housemate)	
