= Mikee Forever =

1999 Philippine television sitcom series

- Title card
- Genre: Sitcom
- Developed by: Jose Javier Reyes; Mel del Rosario
- Written by: Mel del Rosario
- Directed by: Ipe Pelino
- Starring: Mikee Cojuangco-Jaworski
- Opening theme: "Mikee Forever"
- Country of origin: Philippines
- Original language: Tagalog
- No. of episodes: 26

Production
- Executive producer: Veronique del Rosario-Corpuz
- Camera setup: Multiple-camera setup
- Running time: 42 minutes
- Production company: Viva Television

Original release
- Network: GMA Network
- Release: March 3 – September 1, 1999

Mikee Forever is a 1999 Philippine television sitcom series broadcast by GMA Network. Directed by Ipe Pelino, it stars Mikee Cojuangco-Jaworski in the title role. It premiered on March 10, 1999. The series concluded on September 1, 1999, with a total of 26 episodes.

== Cast and characters ==
Lead cast

- Mikee Cojuangco-Jaworski as Mikaela / Mikee

Supporting cast

- Edu Manzano as George
- Rufa Mae Quinto
- Sherilyn Reyes
- Sunshine Dizon
- Polo Ravales
- Rez Cortez
- Red Sternberg
- Maureen Larrazabal
