= Forever (1994 film) =

- Directed by: Rowell Santiago
- Written by: Jose Dalisay Jr.; Ricky Lee; Tatus Aldana
- Produced by: William C. Leary
- Starring: Aga Muhlach; Mikee Cojuangco
- Cinematography: Marissa Floirendo
- Edited by: Ike Jarlego Jr.; Marya Ignacio
- Music by: Louie J. Ocampo
- Production companies: Viva Films; GMA Network
- Distributed by: Viva Films
- Release date: September 28, 1994
- Running time: 112 minutes
- Country: Philippines
- Language: Filipino

Forever is a 1994 Philippine romantic drama film directed by Rowell Santiago. The film stars Aga Muhlach and Mikee Cojuangco in her theatrical debut.

The film is streaming online on YouTube.

== Plot ==
Isabel (Mikee) runs away from her family upon knowing she will be forced to marry Albert (Tonton), the family's business associate whom she does not love. She moves to Manila and works as a waitress under her new identity. There, she meets and falls in love with Chito (Aga), a happy-go-lucky person.

== Cast ==
- Aga Muhlach as Chito
- Mikee Cojuangco as Isabel
- Pilar Pilapil as Purita
- Dante Rivero as Iking
- Tonton Gutierrez as Albert
- Tommy Abuel as Gusting
- Bing Loyzaga as Beth
- Marjorie Barretto as Vivian
- Angelu De Leon as Cindy
- Rosemarie Gil as Mrs. Campos
- Johnny Wilson as Mr. Campos
- Kate Gomez as Cindy's Friend
- Dexter Doria as Mrs. Tagle
- Evelyn Vargas as Evelyn
- Jinky Oda as Charity
- Rolando Tinio as Mr. Malicsi
- Lucy Quinto as Manang Joyce
- Tyrone Sason as Brix
- Edwin Bayani as Bayani
- DJ Durano as Jason
- Archi Adamos as Detective
- Boyet Mercado as Mang Ben
- Zorayda Sanchez as Facial Girl

== Original soundtrack ==
The film's official soundtrack "Forever", was originally sung by the Filipino band, Passage. It was also covered by Martin Nievera and Regine Velasquez but their version is not included in the official soundtrack.
