= William Abbenseth =

American photographer

- Born: 1898; New York, New York, United States
- Died: 1972 (aged 73–74); San Francisco, California, United States
- Known for: Photography

William Abbenseth (1898–1972) was an American photographer known for his black and white photographs of San Francisco architecture.

== Personal life and education ==
William Abbenseth was born in New York New York in 1898. Abbenseth describes his photography education as informal taking occasional classes at Berkeley University and learned techniques from his colleagues. He died in San Francisco California in 1972.

== Works Project Administration work ==
Encouraged by Joe Danysh Abbenseth became involved in the Federal Art Project in the mid-1930s. He began by photographing San Francisco architecture, paintings, and sculptures before being made supervisor of the photographic department, which paid him ten more dollars a month than his previous position, totaling approximately $94 a month in income. He primarily photographed San Francisco homes and a selection were published in books and newspapers, exhibited at then San Francisco Museum of Art, and used in a photo mural co-designed by Abbenseth and Ben Cunningham for the San Francisco City Hall. Abbenseth also worked for the Index of American Design, documenting the architecture of and artwork within Spanish missions. He had an interest in film, and began to film his activities related to the Federal Art Project, documenting work by Sargent Johnson at Aquatic Park and the art of making stained glass, which was funded by the University of California. He also created a documentary about the San Francisco Housing Authority. During his involvement in the FAP he photographed artists such as Benny Bufano and Reuben Kadish. Abbenseth credited his work with the Federal Art Project as being an educational, which allowed him to work with and learn from the photographers of Group f/64 and filmmaker Ralph Steiner.

== Notable collections ==
- Ball State University, Muncie, Indiana
- Los Angeles County Museum of Art, Los Angeles, California
- Ohio State University, Columbus, Ohio
- SFMOMA, San Francisco, California
