= Mikee Cojuangco-Jaworski =

Filipino sports official, equestrian, television host and actress (born 1974)

Member of the IOC Executive Board
- Incumbent
- Assumed office July 18, 2020

Personal details
- Born: February 26, 1974 (age 52) Manila, Philippines
- Spouse: Robert Jaworski Jr. (m. 1999)
- Children: 3 (including Robbie)
- Parents: Peping Cojuangco (father); Tingting Cojuangco (mother)
- Relatives: Cojuangco family
- Occupation: Sports administrator
- Sports career
- Sport: Equestrian
- Event: Show jumping
Medal record
Representing Philippines
Equestrian
Asian Games
Gold medal – first place	2002 Busan	Individual jumping
Silver medal – second place	2002 Busan	Team jumping

Mikaela Ma. Antonia "Mikee" de los Reyes Cojuangco-Jaworski (born February 26, 1974) is a Filipino equestrian, sports administrator, former actress, singer, and television host. She is a member of the IOC Executive Board since 2020. She serves as the chairperson of the IOC Coordination Commission for the 2032 Summer Olympics. She was a gold medalist at the 2002 Asian Games in Busan, South Korea. She is also the wife of incumbent Pasig vice mayor Robert Jaworski Jr. and the mother of actor Robbie Jaworski.

== Early life ==
Cojuangco-Jaworski was born to Jose Cojuangco, Jr., former Congressman of Tarlac and Tingting Cojuangco, former Governor of Tarlac and now president of the Philippine Public Safety College. Her father is a member of the affluent Cojuangco family, who owns a 6,000-hectare sugar plantation known as Hacienda Luisita. She is the third of five daughters: Luisita C. Bautista, Josephine C. Guingona, Margarita Demetria C. Zini and Regina Patricia Jose C. Gonzalez. She is also a niece of former Philippine president Corazon Cojuangco-Aquino, first cousin of fellow actress Kris Aquino and former Philippine president Noynoy Aquino.

Her first rise to prominence was as a model for a Swatch commercial in 1991, where she appeared with Alvin Patrimonio.

She is a high school alumna of the Colegio San Agustin – Makati. She graduated with a Bachelor of Arts degree in Psychology from Ateneo de Manila University in 1996.

== Equestrian and acting career ==
Cojuangco-Jaworski started to show interest in riding at age eight but was only allowed to take lessons by her parents when she turned 10. At the age of 16, she joined her first international competition at Shizuoka, Japan where she placed third in the individual show jumping. Her most significant victory was at the 2002 Asian Games in Busan, South Korea, at which she won the Philippines' third and last gold medal in the individual show jumping event. In the mid 90's, Coujangco-Jaworksi would star in numerous action and romantic comedy movies. She starred in her own weekly drama anthology called Mikee on GMA Network, and also she starred in her first sitcom, Mikee Forever also aired on GMA-7. She would later be paired with Cesar Montano and Aga Muhlach in two films. She, along with Donna Cruz and Regine Velasquez, starred in their namesake blockbuster movie Do Re Mi. The movie became a cult classic in the 90's and even launched a successful soundtrack.

She was later appointed as the flag bearer at the 2010 Asian Games despite not competing at the Games.

Cojuangco-Jaworski starred in the fantasy soap opera Magic Palayok aired on GMA Network.

On May 23, 2013, CEO of Goshen Land Capital, Inc, Alexander Bangsoy, announced that Cojuango-Jaworski will be the firm's celebrity endorser. Goshen Land Capital, Inc. is a Baguio-based real estate organization engaged in the development of residential subdivisions in prime locations in Baguio.

She became an IOC member at the 125th IOC Session held in Buenos Aires in September 2013. In 2020, she was elected to the IOC Executive Board to serve a five-year term.

== Personal life ==
She married former basketball player Robert Jaworski Jr. on July 30, 1999. They first met during a group date in 1997. Together, they have three sons: Robert Vincent Anthony III (Robbie), Rafael Joseph (Raf) and Renzo.

== Filmography ==
=== Film ===
Year	Title	Role	Notes
1994	Forever	Joyce/Isabelle	Lead Role
1995	I Love You Sabado!!	Angelique	Lead Role
1995	Manalo Matalo, Mahal Kita	Pat	Lead Role
1996	DoReMi	Mikki Tolentino	Lead Role
1996	Mahal Kita, Alam Mo Ba?	Teresa	Lead Role
1997	Nag-iisang Ikaw	Stacey	Lead Role
1997	Buhay Mo'y Buhay Ko Rin	SP01 Digna Sta. Rita	Lead Role
1998	Dahil ba sa kanya	Mitch Carmona	Lead Role
1999	Kasangga: Kahit Kailan	Julie/May	Lead Role
2009	You Changed My Life	Christina	Supporting Role

=== Television ===
Year	Title	Role	Notes
1995	Eat Bulaga!	Herself	Host
1995	Mikee	Herself	Lead Role
1999	Mikee Forever	Herself	Lead Role
1999	Dear Mikee	Herself	Host
2003	All About You	Herself	Host
2006	Majika	Tamara	Special Participation
2011	Magic Palayok	Isadora De Leon	Special Participation
2011	I-Shine Talent Camp TV	Herself	Host

== Personal life ==
Cojuangco-Jaworski is also an actress and a commercial model. She is married to Pasig Vice Mayor Robert "Dodot" Jaworski, Jr., the son of basketball player and ex-senator Robert "Sonny" Jaworski, since 1999. They met during a group date in 1997. Together, they have three sons named Robert Vincent Anthony III (Robbie), Rafael Joseph (Raf) and Renzo.

She previously dated Aga Muhlach in 1994.
