= Robbie Jaworski =

Filipino actor

- Born: Robert Vincent Anthony Cojuangco Jaworski III; January 15, 2000 (age 26); Quezon City, Philippines
- Citizenship: Filipino
- Occupation: Actor
- Years active: 2024–present
- Agent(s): Star Magic; Sparkle GMA Artist Center
- Parents: Mikee Cojuangco-Jaworski; Robert Jaworski Jr.
- Relatives: Robert Jaworski (grandfather); Jose Cojuangco Jr. (grandfather); Tingting Cojuangco (grandmother); Ramon Revilla Sr. (great-grandfather)

Robert Vincent Anthony "Robbie" Cojuangco Jaworski III (born January 15, 2000) is a Filipino actor. He is the son of incumbent Pasig vice mayor Robert Jaworski Jr. and actress-equestrienne Mikee Cojuangco-Jaworski, and a grandson of basketball player and former senator Robert Jaworski.

== Early life and education ==
Jaworski was born on January 15, 2000, in Quezon City. He is the eldest son of former basketball player Robert "Dodot" Jaworski Jr. and actress-equestrienne Mikee Cojuangco-Jaworski. He has two younger brothers. He took up Management at Ateneo de Manila University. He was in the hospitality industry before acting, such as working as a front desk officer, and also helps in family business concerns.

He previously played varsity basketball but ended his collegiate playing career due to injury.

== Career ==
Jaworski signed with ABS-CBN’s Star Magic in November 2024. His early work with the network included serving as a video jockey on Myx.

In 2025, he made his film debut as Lester in the Star Cinema production entitled Meet, Greet & Bye. The same year, he was part of the television series "The Alibi" as Edward Cabrera. In 2026, he will portray roles in the series The Loyalty Game.

In 2026, Jaworski joined the reality television series Pinoy Big Brother: Collab Edition 3.0 as a celebrity houseguest. Initially introduced as a housemate, he was later revealed to be one of Big Brother’s collaborators, tasked with leading the season’s Big Charity Mission.

== Personal life ==
Jaworski said of his parents’ advice to stay grounded as he worked in a public industry that he admits did make him feel some pressure because of his family legacy but never the burden.

== Filmography ==
=== Film ===
Year	Title	Role	Notes
2025	Meet, Greet & Bye.	Lester	Film debut

=== Television ===
Year	Title	Role	Notes	Ref.
2025	The Alibi	Edward Cabrera		
2026	The Loyalty Game	Juancho Madrigal / Jigo		
2026	Y Speak 2.0	Himself	Host	
2026–present	Pinoy Big Brother: Collab 3.0	Himself	Houseguest	
