= The Alibi (TV series) =

Philippine romantic thriller television series

- Promotional poster for the teleserye version
- Genre: Romantic thriller; Mystery; Crime drama; Psychological thriller
- Written by: Danica Domingo
- Directed by: Onat Diaz; FM Reyes; Jojo Saguin
- Starring: Kim Chiu; Paulo Avelino
- Music by: Jessie Lasaten
- Country of origin: Philippines
- Original language: Filipino
- No. of episodes: 14 (Prime Video); 93 (TV)

Production
- Executive producers: Carlo Katigbak; Cory Vidanes; Laurenti Dyogi; Kylie Manalo-Balagtas; Rondel Lindayag
- Producers: Catherine Magdael-Abarrondo; Eleanor Martinez
- Production location: Cebu City
- Camera setup: Single-camera
- Running time: 59–60 minutes (Prime Video); 21–28 minutes (TV)
- Production company: Dreamscape Entertainment

Original release
- Network: Amazon Prime Video
- Release: November 7 – December 19, 2025
- Network: Kapamilya Channel (Note: The teleserye version of the series, subtitled as Ang Buong Katotohanan, is currently airing on its primary networks ALLTV2 (through its ABS-CBN licensing) and Kapamilya Channel as well as other affiliate blocktime channels and online platforms via Kapamilya Online Live through Facebook and YouTube. It is also available on-demand via iWant and internationally via The Filipino Channel.)
- Release: March 16 – July 24, 2026

The Alibi is a Philippine romantic thriller drama television series produced by Dreamscape Entertainment. Directed by Onat Diaz, FM Reyes and Jojo Saguin, it stars Kim Chiu and Paulo Avelino. The series premiered on Amazon Prime Video on November 7, 2025. The extended version of the series, titled The Alibi: Ang Buong Katotohanan (transl. The Alibi: The Entire Truth), premiered on March 16, 2026, on ALLTV2 (through its ABS-CBN licensing) and Kapamilya Channel's Primetime Bida evening block. The series concluded on July 24, 2026 with a total of 93 episodes.

== Premise ==
Vincent, an heir to a news empire, gets accused of killing his rival, Walter. To protect his reputation, he hires Stella, an escort with her own haunted past, to pose as his alibi. What begins as a transactional arrangement soon becomes dangerously real as their shared wounds and ambitions draw them together. But when they uncover the truth, the two are compelled to confront their true feelings.

=== Alternate ending ===
Before the broadcast of the 2026 extended television version, the series concluded with a tragic ending in its original 14-episode release. In the finale, "Breaking Point", Vincent is fatally shot while protecting Stella. At his funeral, Stella delivers a eulogy before the narrative jumps forward by two years, where the series ends with Stella, accompanied by her family and friends, visiting Vincent's grave to share the news of her achieving her degree.

In the extended television version, Vincent survives his injuries. The series then concludes with Vincent and Stella beginning a new chapter of their lives together in Canada. The extended ending also reuses part of Stella's eulogy as a voiceover before the scenes depicting Vincent and Stella's new life in Canada.

== Cast and characters ==
=== Main cast ===
- Kim Chiu as Stella Marie Morales
- Paulo Avelino as Vincent Cabrera

=== Supporting cast ===
- John Arcilla as Arthur Cabrera
  - Joem Bascon as young Arthur
- Zsa Zsa Padilla as Jacqueline Diaz-Cabrera
  - Aya Fernandez as young Jacqueline
- Sofia Andres as Claudia Montenegro-Cabrera
- Rafael Rosell as Matthew Cabrera
- Robbie Jaworski as Edward Cabrera
- Angelina Cruz as Katherine Rose "Katherine" Morales

=== Recurring cast ===
- Ayesha Bajeta as Bea Cabrera / Joy Morales
- Alma Moreno as Mama Mona
- Romnick Sarmenta as Andres Tolentino
- Ian de Leon as Ricardo Zamora
- Alyanna Angeles as Daphne Reyes
- PJ Endrinal as Charlie Vicente
- Lotlot Bustamante as Sonia Vicente
- Enzo Osorio as Joseph Morales
- Thou Reyes as George
- Alora Sasam as Fiona Gambosa
- Marvin Yap as Norman Javier
- Johaira Moris Omar as Bubbles
- Yesh Burce as Sugar
- Kim Tubiano as Anika
- Archi Adamos as Col. Hector Demano

=== Guest cast ===
- Sam Milby as Walter Cunanan/Walter Lopez
  - Noel Comia Jr. as young Walter
- Kathleen Hermosa as landslide victim
- Rocky Salumbides as Bobby
- Joel Molina as Stella's hired investigator
- Elyson De Dios as Vincent's biological father
- Art Acuña as Manuel Reyes
- Irma Adlawan as Rebecca Morales
  - Iana Bernardez as young Rebecca Morales
- Isabelle Daza as Dra. Ramona Castro
- Epy Quizon as Santillan "Santi" Rasco
- Al Tantay as Emilio Cunanan
- Ana Abad Santos as Marla Cunanan
- Gelli de Belen as Teresa Lopez
- John-Joven Uy as Detective Leon Mercado

== Episodes ==
=== The Alibi ===
No.	Title	Original release date
1	"Truth and Lies"	November 7, 2025
2	"The Price of Innocence"	November 7, 2025
3	"The Troubled Alibi"	November 14, 2025
4	"A Night of Reckoning"	November 14, 2025
5	"The Fall and the Flame"	November 21, 2025
6	"Shadows of Truth"	November 21, 2025
7	"Confessions"	November 28, 2025
8	"The Hand That Moves"	November 28, 2025
9	"Poisoned Truth"	December 5, 2025
10	"The Blood Secret"	December 5, 2025
11	"Hearts Under Fire"	December 12, 2025
12	"Ashes and Sins"	December 12, 2025
13	"What Remains"	December 19, 2025
14	"Breaking Point"	December 19, 2025
After Vincent protects Stella from Arthur holding the gun, Arthur got shot by Jaqueline and after Vincent asked Stella if she’s okay she saw blood on her hands which means Vincent also got shot and told Stella to fulfill their dreams together and years passed by Vincent died and Stella said everything what Vincent was and promises to fulfill what Vincent said.

=== The Alibi: Ang Buong Katotohanan ===
No. overall	Title	TV title	Original release date	AGB Nielsen Ratings (NUTAM People)	Timeslot rank
1	"Collision"	"The Beginning"	March 16, 2026	5.6%	#2
2	"Immoral"	"Announcement"	March 17, 2026	5.0%	#2
3	"Breaking Point"	"Crime"	March 18, 2026	4.6%	#2
4	"Frictions"	"Investigation"	March 19, 2026	N/A	TBA
5	"Unexpected Offer"	"Offer"	March 20, 2026	N/A	TBA
6	"Troubles"	"Deceptions"	March 23, 2026	N/A	TBA
7	"Complications"	"Connivance"	March 24, 2026	N/A	TBA
8	"Fractures"	"Conflict"	March 25, 2026	N/A	TBA
9	"Deal"	"Family Dinner"	March 26, 2026	N/A	TBA
10	"Intruder"	"Cover Up"	March 27, 2026	N/A	TBA
11	"Leverage"	"Reminisce"	March 30, 2026	N/A	TBA
12	"Backlash"	"Viral"	March 31, 2026	N/A	TBA
13	"Confession"	"Mislead"	April 1, 2026	N/A	TBA
14	"Twisted Fate"	"Twisted Fate"	April 6, 2026	N/A	TBA
15	"Showdown"	"Showdown"	April 7, 2026	N/A	TBA
16	"Vulnerable"	"Probation"	April 8, 2026	N/A	TBA
17	"Bait"	"Bait"	April 9, 2026	N/A	TBA
18	"Opportunity"	"Invitation"	April 10, 2026	N/A	TBA
19	"Unexpected"	"Preparation"	April 13, 2026	N/A	TBA
20	"Conflicts"	"Investor's Ball"	April 14, 2026	N/A	TBA
21	"Humiliation"	"Exposed"	April 15, 2026	N/A	TBA
22	"Split-Up"	"Star Dancer"	April 16, 2026	N/A	TBA
23	"New Approach"	"Replacement"	April 17, 2026	N/A	TBA
24	"Last Chance"	"Track Down"	April 20, 2026	3.8%	#2
25	"Trap"	"Walk Of Shame"	April 21, 2026	3.8%	#2
26	"Aftermath"	"Breaking Silence"	April 22, 2026	3.4%	#2
27	"Suspicion"	"Switched"	April 23, 2026	2.9%	#2
28	"Unmasked"	"Trouble"	April 24, 2026	N/A	TBA
29	"Shadows"	"Drunk"	April 27, 2026	N/A	TBA
30	"Anxiety"	"Deceived"	April 28, 2026	N/A	TBA
31	"Clash"	"Scheme"	April 29, 2026	N/A	TBA
32	"Retribution"	"Threat"	April 30, 2026	N/A	TBA
33	"Shatter"	"Uncover"	May 1, 2026	N/A	TBA
34	"Fracture"	"Intruder"	May 4, 2026	3.4%	#2
35	"Evidence"	"Evidence"	May 5, 2026	3.2%	#2
36	"Descent"	"Hide Out"	May 6, 2026	3.1%	#2
37	"Convergence"	"Lion's Den"	May 7, 2026	3.1%	#2
38	"Exposé"	“Exposé”	May 8, 2026	2.7%	#2
39	"Sacrificial Lamb"	"Kicked Out"	May 11, 2026	3.7%	#2
40	"Bro Code"	"Uncertainty"	May 12, 2026	3.5%	#2
41	"Background Check"	"Coming Back"	May 13, 2026	2.6%	#2
42	"Hidden Roots"	"Trauma”	May 14, 2026	2.9%	#2
43	"Evil Origins"	"Deceive"	May 15, 2026	2.1%	#2
44	"Orphanage"	"Trace"	May 18, 2026	N/A	TBA
45	"Chase"	"Records"	May 19, 2026	N/A	TBA
46	"Brother’s Scheme"	"Scandal"	May 20, 2026	N/A	TBA
47	"Tainted Past"	"Connection"	May 21, 2026	N/A	TBA
48	"True Intentions"	"Search"	May 22, 2026	N/A	TBA
49	"Resurface"	"Autopsy"	May 25, 2026	N/A	TBA
50	"Undercurrent"	"Bonding"	May 26, 2026	N/A	TBA
51	"Protect"	"Rescue"	May 27, 2026	N/A	TBA
52	"Wrong Hands"	"Ambush"	May 28, 2026	N/A	TBA
53	"Sentiment"	"Assault"	May 29, 2026	N/A	TBA
54	"Head On"	"Confess"	June 1, 2026	N/A	TBA
55	"Threshold"	"Complications"	June 2, 2026	N/A	TBA
56	"Intrusion"	"Bluff"	June 3, 2026	N/A	TBA
57	"Autopsy"	"Pursuit"	June 4, 2026	N/A	TBA
58	"Family"	"Tension"	June 5, 2026	N/A	TBA
59	"Crossfire"	"Affirmation"	June 8, 2026	N/A	TBA
60	"Unveiled"	"Allegations"	June 9, 2026	N/A	TBA
61	"Apology"	"Apology"	June 10, 2026	N/A	TBA
62	"Mother's Secrets"	"Conspiracy"	June 11, 2026	N/A	TBA
63	"Past Mistakes"	"Protection"	June 12, 2026	N/A	TBA
64	"Neighbors"	"Tragedy"	June 15, 2026	N/A	TBA
65	"Intuition"	"Relationship"	June 16, 2026	N/A	TBA
66	"Revelation"	"Confess"	June 17, 2026	N/A	TBA
67	"Bloodline"	"Hide Out"	June 18, 2026	N/A	TBA
68	"Identity"	"Identity"	June 19, 2026	N/A	TBA
69	"Fallout"	"Tragedy"	June 22, 2026	2.2%	#2
70	"Escape"	"Revelations"	June 23, 2026	N/A	TBA
71	"Whereabouts"	"Accomplice"	June 24, 2026	N/A	TBA
72	"Reignite"	"Hiding"	June 25, 2026	N/A	TBA
73	"Shockwave"	"Quest"	June 26, 2026	N/A	TBA
74	"Unpleasant Reunion"	"Reunited"	June 29, 2026	N/A	TBA
75	"Healing Wounds"	"Danger"	June 30, 2026	N/A	TBA
76	"Time"	"Hazard"	July 1, 2026	N/A	TBA
77	"Accusation"	"Casualty"	July 2, 2026	N/A	TBA
78	"Legacy"	"Face To Face"	July 3, 2026	N/A	TBA
79	"Crosshair"	"Partnership"	July 6, 2026	N/A	TBA
80	"Checkmate"	"Blackmail"	July 7, 2026	N/A	TBA
81	"Broken Trust"	"Manhunt"	July 8, 2026	N/A	TBA
82	"Last Option"	"Grief"	July 9, 2026	N/A	TBA
83	"Reckless Decision"	"Justice"	July 10, 2026	N/A	TBA
84	"Stand Firm"	"Reciprocate"	July 13, 2026	N/A	TBA
85	"Exposure"	"Fight Back"	July 14, 2026	N/A	TBA
86	"Risk"	"Bloodline"	July 15, 2026	N/A	TBA
87	"Reopening"	"Unfold"	July 16, 2026	N/A	TBA
88	"Undo"	"Renewal”	July 17, 2026	N/A	TBA
89	"Pressure"	"Connections"	July 20, 2026	N/A	TBA
90	"Pursuit"	"Proof"	July 21, 2026	N/A	TBA
91	"Tight Spot"	"Testimony"	July 22, 2026	N/A	TBA
92	"Tragedy"	"Truth"	July 23, 2026	N/A	TBA
93	"Conquer"	"Unexpected Ending"	July 24, 2026	N/A	TBA
Years past by Stella is living in Canada and she was video calling her family and then meets Vincent who turns out to be alive and both are happy to see each other which makes this the alternate ending.

== Production ==
=== Filming ===
Principal photography started in Cebu City in August 2025. The alternate ending was filmed in Stanley Park, Vancouver.

== Marketing ==
Prime Video Philippines released series teaser photos, confirming that the service would stream the series.

An official trailer was released on October 14, 2025.

== Release ==
The series premiered on Amazon Prime Video on November 7, 2025 consisting with 14 episodes. The teleserye version (subtitled as "Ang Buong Katotohanan"; transl. The Entire Truth), which is the uncut and extended version of the series, was released on iWant a week before its free TV release on March 9, 2026, and on ALLTV2 (through its ABS-CBN licensing), Kapamilya Channel, and A2Z with delayed airing on Jeepney TV on March 16, 2026. This version was also available on TFC. The television broadcast consists of 93 episodes with an alternate ending.

== Reception ==
=== Critical response ===
Alwin Ignacio of Daily Tribune said that the series has good cinematography and the first episode gave the actors A-plus performances. Scott Clark of Gazetelly praises the pacing of the story and the performances of Kim Chiu and Paulo Avelino and also said that the drama is well-produced.

=== Ratings ===
According to AGB Nielsen Philippines' Nationwide Urban Television Audience Measurement People in television homes, the pilot episode of The Alibi: Ang Buong Katotohanan earned a 5.6% rating.
