= The Loyalty Game =

Philippine psychological drama television series

- Genre: Romantic thriller; Psychological drama; Psychological thriller
- Written by: Mary Pearl Utola: Joshua Ducasen
- Directed by: Mae Cruz-Alviar; Cathy Garcia-Sampana; Ian D. Loreños; Raymund B. Ocampo
- Starring: Janine Gutierrez; Jericho Rosales
- Opening theme: "Hidden" by Angia
- Country of origin: Philippines
- Original languages: Filipino; English
- No. of episodes: 14 (Amazon Prime Video); 25 (TV)

Production
- Executive producers: Carlo Katigbak; Cory Vidanes; Laurenti Dyogi
- Producers: Des M. de Guzman; Sackey Prince Pendatun; Pamela Mendiola Quizon
- Production locations: Iloilo City; Bacolod; Talisay, Negros Occidental
- Editor: Joshua Ducasen
- Camera setup: Single-camera
- Running time: 55–62 minutes (Prime Video); 34-19 minutes (TV)
- Production company: Star Creatives

Original release
- Network: Amazon Prime Video
- Release: July 3 – August 14, 2026
- Network: Kapamilya Channel (Note: The series also airs on its primary networks All TV (through its ABS-CBN licensing) and Kapamilya Channel as well as other affiliate channels and online platforms via Kapamilya Online Live through Facebook and YouTube. It is also available on-demand via iWant and internationally via The Filipino Channel.)
- Release: October 5, 2026 – present

The Loyalty Game is a 2026 Philippine psychological drama television drama series created by ABS-CBN Studios and produced by Star Creatives. The series was directed by Mae Cruz-Alviar and Cathy Garcia-Sampana. It stars Janine Gutierrez and Jericho Rosales.

== Premise ==
A group of women runs a unique business: luring men to expose their infidelity. Their newest client, Ana, lives a seemingly perfect life with her devoted husband-until doubt creeps in. As he starts to distort her reality, Ana teams up with a loyalty tester, and their search for truth spirals into a dangerous game of secrets, manipulation, and power-where loyalty becomes a matter of life and death.

== Cast and characters ==
=== Main cast ===
- Janine Gutierrez as Silvana "Ana" Madrigal-Santos
  - Anastacia Bartolome as young Ana
- Jericho Rosales as Benjamin "Ben" Santos
  - Raikko Mateo as young Ben
  - Sean Tristan as teen Ben

=== Supporting cast ===
- Carmina Villarroel as Imelda Madrigal
- Sofia Andres as Elizabeth "Bethchay" Valdez
- Yen Santos as Diane Martirez
- Elisse Joson as Bridgette Tangcoy
- Charlie Dizon as Regina "Ging Ging" Santos
  - Stephanie de Groot as young Regina
  - Jana Agoncillo as teen Regina
- Maika Rivera as Carlota Aberin
- Kira Balinger as Angel Lucto
- Yassi Pressman as Mara Lacaba
- Pilar Pilapil as Mona Saguil
- Carlitos Siguion-Reyna as Marianao Saguil
- Bernard Palanca as Antonio "Tonyo" Saguil
- Desiree del Valle as Natalie Saguil
- Antonio Aquitania as Reynaldo Madrigal
- Emmanuelle Vera as Katrina
- Alyanna Angeles as Lucy Saguil
- Robbie Jaworski as Juancho Madrigal
- Karina Bautista as Megan Valdez
- KD Estrada as Harry Valdez
- Manuel Chua as P.Insp/Lance Gomez

=== Guest cast ===
- Meryll Soriano as Mayet
- Joem Bascon as Matt
- Albie Casiño as Jacob
- Epy Quizon as Ben's father
- McCoy de Leon as Joel
- Jennica Garcia as Geraleene
- Floyd Tena
- Chart Motus as Cedes
- JP Larroder
- Raul Montesa as Albert de Castro
- Joel Molina as Danny Pascual
- Milzen Clave Sun as Sam Madrigal
- Ivan Carapiet as Eric
- Elyson de Dios as Mark
- Esteban Mara as Brian
- Hasna Cabral as Rona
- Bart Guingona as Ramon
- JC Israel Chua

== Episodes ==
No.	Title	Original release date
1	"Brain"	July 3, 2026
Ana lives a seemingly perfect life with her dreamy yet enigmatic husband, Ben. But everything begins to shift when she wakes up one night to find him missing from her side. Doubt creeps in as Ben denies it, gradually distorting her sense of reality. Convinced he may be cheating, Ana steps into an unfamiliar world to test her husband's loyalty. Where is ben is allegedly cheating on her wife.
2	"Eyes"	July 3, 2026
Ana pays Diane a hefty sum to put her husband through a loyalty test. Diane proceeds as usual, attempting to seduce Ben, but the lawyer remains focused on the sugar refinery's troubles, worsened by Antonio, the owner's son and his rival for the CEO position. Just when the test seems to have run its course, a new tester enters the picture.
3	"Shoulder"	July 10, 2026
Beth secretly tests Ben's loyalty, but after he helps her through several difficult situations, she finds herself torn between gratitude and her duty to reveal the truth to Ana. Meanwhile, Ana grows increasingly anxious as a figure from her past returns. Unaware of his wife's schemes, Ben does everything he can to protect his secrets-even if others must suffer the consequences of uncovering them.
4	"Neck"	July 10, 2026
Ben becomes the suspect in Antonio's death, but the truth behind the crime is far more complicated than it seems. As suspicion also falls on Beth because of her ties to the Saguils, she risks exposing her secret work as a loyalty tester. Meanwhile, Diane, Bridgette, and Carlota report Angel missing, but one of them appears to be hiding something.
5	"Backbone"	July 17, 2026
Ben finally gets the life he has always wanted, but protecting it proves difficult as he struggles to keep part of his past hidden. Amid preparations for Ben's surprise party, Ana pursues a connection to her husband's past that was meant to stay buried. Meanwhile, Beth ends the loyalty testing, but finds herself drawn to Ben and becoming entangled in Ana's glamorous world.
6	"Jugular"	July 17, 2026
Just as Ana begins to put her doubts aside, a hidden phone in Ben's car and a mysterious phone call reignite her suspicions. As anxiety takes hold, she begins questioning her husband once more. Unaware of his wife's growing fears, Ben comes face-to-face with the person he has been desperate to keep hidden to protect his identity and their marriage.
7	"Carotid"	July 24, 2026
After hearing another woman's voice answer her call from a burner phone, Ana tracks down the person on the other end and comes face-to-face with Mara in a tense confrontation. Meanwhile, another secret unravels when a suspicious online connection between Beth and Diane raises new questions, leading Ben to a discovery that could change everything.
8	"Lips"	July 24, 2026
Trusting her instincts, Ana keeps a close watch on Ben and soon witnesses moments that seem to confirm her worst fears. Meanwhile, convinced that his wife is closing in on the truth, Ben draws an oblivious Beth deeper into a dangerous game to protect the secrets of his identity.
9	"Jaw"	July 31, 2026
Ana is driven to the brink after catching Ben in a compromising moment with Beth, sending her into a downward spiral that leaves their marriage hanging by a thread. As Ben fights to regain his wife's trust, Beth refuses to let go, determined to prove his infidelity and tear the couple apart. But in her quest to expose Ben, Beth uncovers a secret far more shocking than she ever expected.
10	"Nerve"	July 31, 2026
Ana finds herself at the center of public scrutiny as she is hounded by rumors about her marriage. As Ben is cornered by a new threat determined to expose everything about his past, Beth's search for answers about him draws her into danger once again. Meanwhile, an unexpected loss stirs painful emotions and reopens old wounds.
11	"Vein"	August 7, 2026
Ben's carefully guarded secret is thrust into the spotlight when Regina does the unthinkable, shocking the entire town during a significant moment of his life. As Ana struggles to adjust to a new reality at home, she begins to see a side of Ben she has never known. Meanwhile, Bridgette receives an unexpected message pointing to a promising new lead on Angel.
12	"Face"	August 7, 2026
Ana slowly uncovers the troubling truth about Ben's past. At the same time, Ben faces a crisis that spirals beyond his control as Regina's desperate actions end in tragedy. An unexpected witness finds herself caught in the middle of it all.
13	"Heart"	August 14, 2026
Ana struggles to come to terms with Ben's deceptions, driving a deeper wedge between them despite another life-changing discovery. Determined to win his wife back, Ben refuses to let go, even as the distance between them continues to grow. While Beth remains missing, Bridgette, Carlota, and Diane carry out a daring plan to rescue Angel, but the mission comes at a dangerous cost.
14	"Blood"	August 14, 2026
Ana's search for Beth leads her face-to-face with him for one final confrontation. As the truth about their past and the weight of their choices are finally laid bare, Ana is forced to make a decision that could change both of their lives forever. Years pass, and as those left behind try to move on, the shadow of the past continues to linger.

== Production ==
=== Development and casting ===
During their Prime Video Presents event, the series was announced with Janine Gutierrez, Jericho Rosales, and Sofia Andres in the lead roles with Mae Cruz-Alviar as the director of the series which will be her first psychological thriller series. Additional cast are Yen Santos, Kira Balinger, Elisse Joson, Maika Rivera, Sofia Andres, Yassi Pressman, Jennica Garcia, and Carmina Villaroel. Also directing are Ian Loreños, Raymund Ocampo, and Cathy Garcia-Sampana.

=== Filming ===
Principal photography has commenced in Iloilo City in April 2026 with the next location in Bacolod.

== Marketing ==
A 25-second teaser was released on April 14, 2026.

== Release ==
The series premiered on Amazon Prime Video on July 3, 2026. The series consists of 14 episodes. The teleserye version (subtitled as "Level Up"), which is the uncut and extended version of the series, will be release on All TV (through its ABS-CBN licensing) and Kapamilya Channel as well as other affiliate blocktime channels and online platforms for linear television beginning October 5, 2026. It will premiere on iWant 7 days before the original date on September 28, 2026.
