= Bianca Gonzalez =

Filipino model and host (born 1983)

Bianca Gonzalez-Intal
- Born: Bianca Monica Malasmas Gonzalez; March 11, 1983 (age 43); Manila, Philippines
- Years active: 1999–present
- Spouse: JC Intal (m. 2014)
- Children: 2
- Relatives: Dingdong Dantes (cousin)
- Modeling information
- Height: 5 ft 4 in (1.63 m)
- Hair color: Black
- Eye color: Brown

Bianca Monica Malasmas Gonzalez-Intal (Tagalog pronunciation: [gɔnˈsalɛs ʔinˈtal]; born March 11, 1983) is a Filipina television host and model.

== Hosting career ==
Gonzalez first hosted GameChannel Extreme with Iya Villania, Chase Tinio and Aaron Mempin. Her first ever on-cam career in ABS-CBN network however was for the now defunct show, Review Night which she hosted with Ryan Agoncillo in Cinema One. For a little less than a year, she got her Studio 23 stint as a tadjock for Wazzup Wazzup. She also co-hosted MTV U-Break.

In 2001, she hosted Studio 23's Gameplan then transferred to Cinema One's Review Night with Ryan Agoncillo. She also became part of a Studio 23 morning show, Breakfast and later moved to the mother network to co-host Magandang Umaga, Pilipinas and StarDance, the director of which was Lino Cayetano.

Her career was boosted after an invitation to join Pinoy Big Brother: Celebrity Edition where she landed at 3rd place garnering 245,594 votes or 19% of the total votes and got major breaks afterwards. Aside from hosting Y Speak, she also landed a hosting job for Pinoy Big Brother Teen Edition UpLate and as the resident campus VJ for Pinoy Dream Academy's Update and UpLate shows.

She also hosted The Filipino Channel show TFC Connect, where she discusses Filipino issues abroad.

She continues to host and produce Y Speak until it ended in 2010. She also hosted the now defunct showbiz-oriented news show Blog: Barkada Log, and the showbiz show Entertainment Live, but ended on January 28, 2012, and together with her co-hosts in Pinoy Big Brother, Toni Gonzaga and Mariel Rodriguez. She reprised her role as one of the hosts of Pinoy Big Brother: Celebrity Edition 2 in a brand new "spin-off" show called Über. She hosts Cinema News Alert: Weekend Edition and a Cinema Jock features movie of the day on Cinema One.

I Am Ninoy is a weekly television program that highlights inspired modern-day individuals from the younger generation. Originally based on a public awareness campaign, the show formerly aired on TV5 and originally premiered on November 25 to coincide with the birth anniversary of the late Senator Ninoy Aquino.

Last December 14, 2011, Gonzalez signed a 2-year Contract with ABS-CBN. Present during Gonzalez' contract signing were ABS-CBN executives including president Charo Santos-Concio. She hosted ABS-CBN's flagship morning show, Umagang Kay Ganda until 2014.

She continued to co-host Pinoy Big Brother until in 2022, when she became the main host of the reality show after Toni Gonzaga left the show. Currently, she still mainly hosts PBB now on her 20th year on the reality show, and returned to TFC via BRGY, and hosting Cinema One's newest celebrity talk show, The B-Side.

== Advocacies and issues ==
On February 11, 2010, Bianca Gonzalez was appointed a UNICEF Philippines Child Rights Supporter. She has supported UNICEF in a personal capacity since 2007, including fundraising for education activities. In December 2007, she raised PHP 36,000 through her blog website for UNICEF's 100-book library program.

On December 10, 2013, her continuous support for Typhoon Haiyan survivors landed her the 6th spot in The Huffington Post 6 Celebrities Who Remind Us to Not Forget Typhoon Haiyan Survivors Too Soon alongside other international celebrities such as Victoria and David Beckham, Pau Gasol, Rihanna, Vanessa Hudgens and Justin Bieber.

== Personal life ==
She is the sister of TV host JC Gonzalez. In March 2014, she was engaged to PBA player JC Intal, whom she married on December 4, 2014, in El Nido, Palawan. In April 2015, television host Boy Abunda announced on his program Aquino & Abunda Tonight that Gonzalez and her husband Intal were expecting their first child. The child, a daughter, Lucia Martine was born on October 23, 2015.

== Filmography ==
=== Television ===
- Y-Speak (2004-2010) as herself/host
- Pinoy Big Brother (2006–present) as herself/host/Housemate
- Pinoy Dream Academy (2006) as herself/host
- Entertainment Live (2007-2010, 2011-2012) as herself/host
- Cinemanews (2008-2023) as herself/host
- SNN: Showbiz News Ngayon (2010-2011) as herself/host
- Umagang Kay Ganda (2012-2014) as herself/host
- BRGY (2024-2025) as herself/host
- The B-Side (2024-present) as herself/host

=== Film ===
Year	Title	Role
1999	Di Pwedeng Hindi Puwede	Orphan
2009	Squalor	TV News Reporter
2009	OMG (Oh, My Girl!)	Bianca Gonzalez

== Awards ==
Year	Award	Category	Work	Result
2008	Meg Teen Choice Awards	Favorite Female Host		Won
2008	UP Gandingan	Best Panel Discussion Host	Y Speak	Won
2010	24th PMPC Star Awards	Best Female Showbiz-Oriented Talk Show Host	E-Live	Won
