= Architecture of San Francisco =

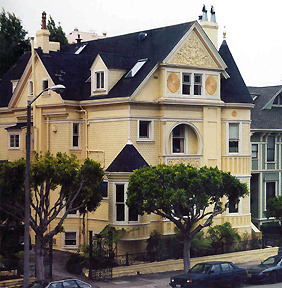
The C. A. Belden House, a Queen Anne Victorian in the Pacific Heights section on Gough Street Between Clay and Washington Streets. The house is on the National Register of Historic Places in San Francisco.

The architecture of San Francisco is not so much known for defining a particular architectural style; rather, with its interesting and challenging variations in geography and topology and tumultuous history, San Francisco is known worldwide for its particularly eclectic mix of Victorian and modern architecture. Bay windows were identified as a defining characteristic of San Francisco architecture in a 2012 study that had a machine learning algorithm examine a random sample of 25,000 photos of cities from Google Street View.

Icons of San Francisco architecture include the Golden Gate Bridge, Alcatraz Island, Coit Tower, the Palace of Fine Arts, Lombard Street, Alamo Square, Fort Point, the Transamerica Pyramid, and Chinatown. Included below are summaries of the historical significance of some of these great San Franciscan architectural achievements.

== Fort Point ==
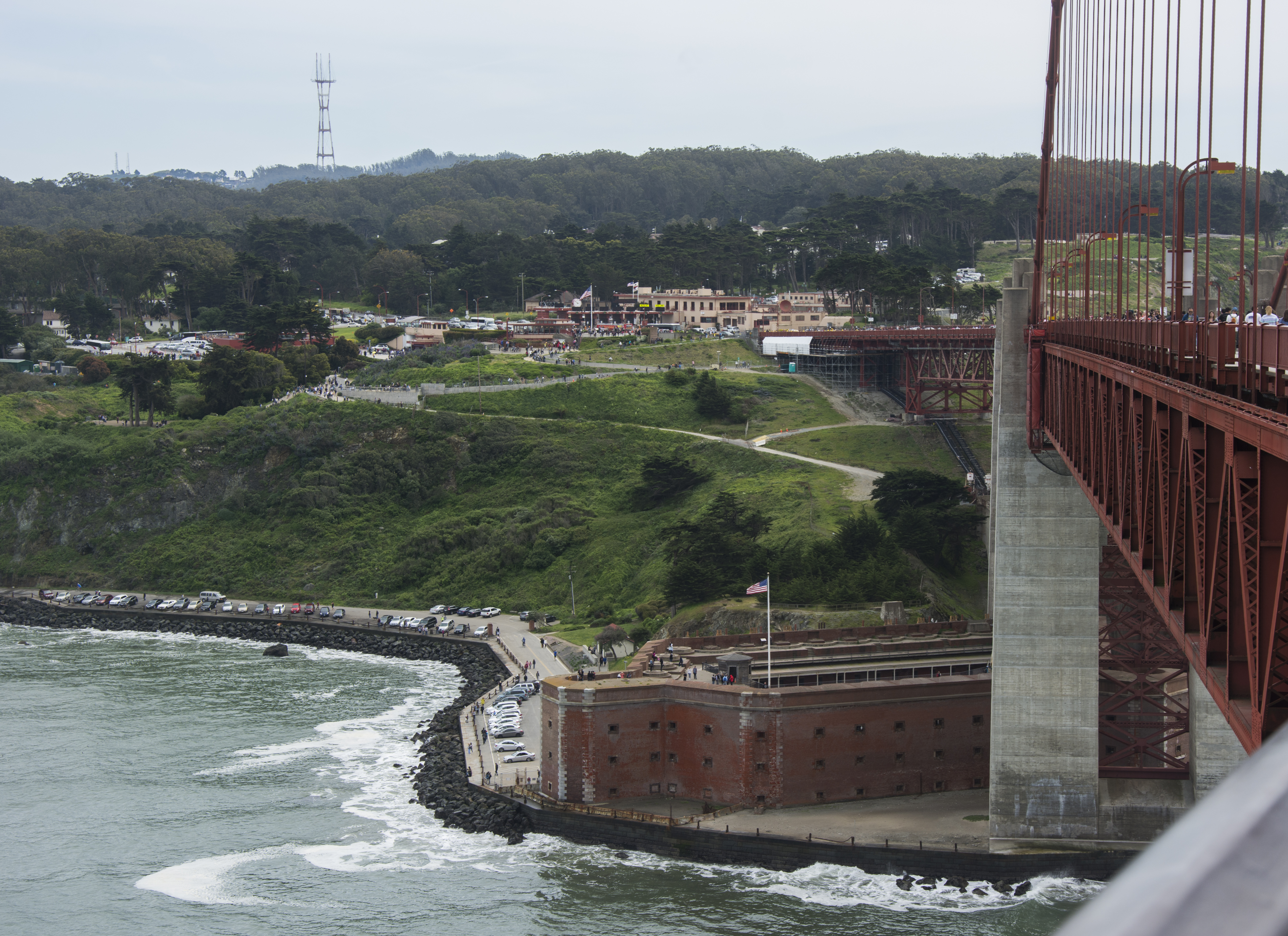
The fort from the Golden Gate Bridge deck

At the foot of the Golden Gate bridge is Fort Point, built to protect the Bay from naval attacks. Designed to allow cannons to hit enemy ships at water level, Fort Point is the only one of its kind in the west. It was originally constructed under the leadership of Spanish Lieutenant Jose Joaquin Moraga. Moraga had been sent up from Monterey, about 100 miles south of San Francisco, to build fortifications in the San Francisco Bay in order to secure Spanish control over the whole area. In 1792, he built a Presidio style fort, which had sufficient fortifications, but was clearly not strong enough to truly act as the main defense of the harbor.

In 1796, Moraga redesigned the fort and gave it the name, Castillo de San Joaquín. Unfortunately, the fort was built from adobe brick and constructed on sand, meaning that the adobe cracked when one of the cannons was fired and that each winter the Fort would be heavily damaged from the weather. After the Mexican War of Independence in 1821, the Spanish were forced to abandon all of posts in California, including the Castillo. Once the fort was abandoned, the Mexican government attempted to maintain it and others of its kind, but the young government simply did not have the resources to do so. All of the forts in California were abandoned by 1835.

After California was granted statehood in 1850, the fort still sat unused until 1856, when the United States government allotted $500,000 (about $14 million in today's money) to install fortifications in California. The people in charge of the fortifications decided to rebuild The Castillo de San Joaquín, but using much more modern materials and building techniques. The fort was built on a granite foundation with masonry walls 12 feet thick. The fort was loaded with weapons and renamed Fort Point. At the time, the fort was incredibly impressive and served as the main fortification protecting the San Francisco bay. It was also the most powerful heavily fortified fort on the west coast when it was built. However, after the civil war, masonry forts of its type were rendered technologically obsolete, leaving Fort Point as simply a testament to San Francisco's pre-Civil War military might.

== The Golden Gate Bridge ==
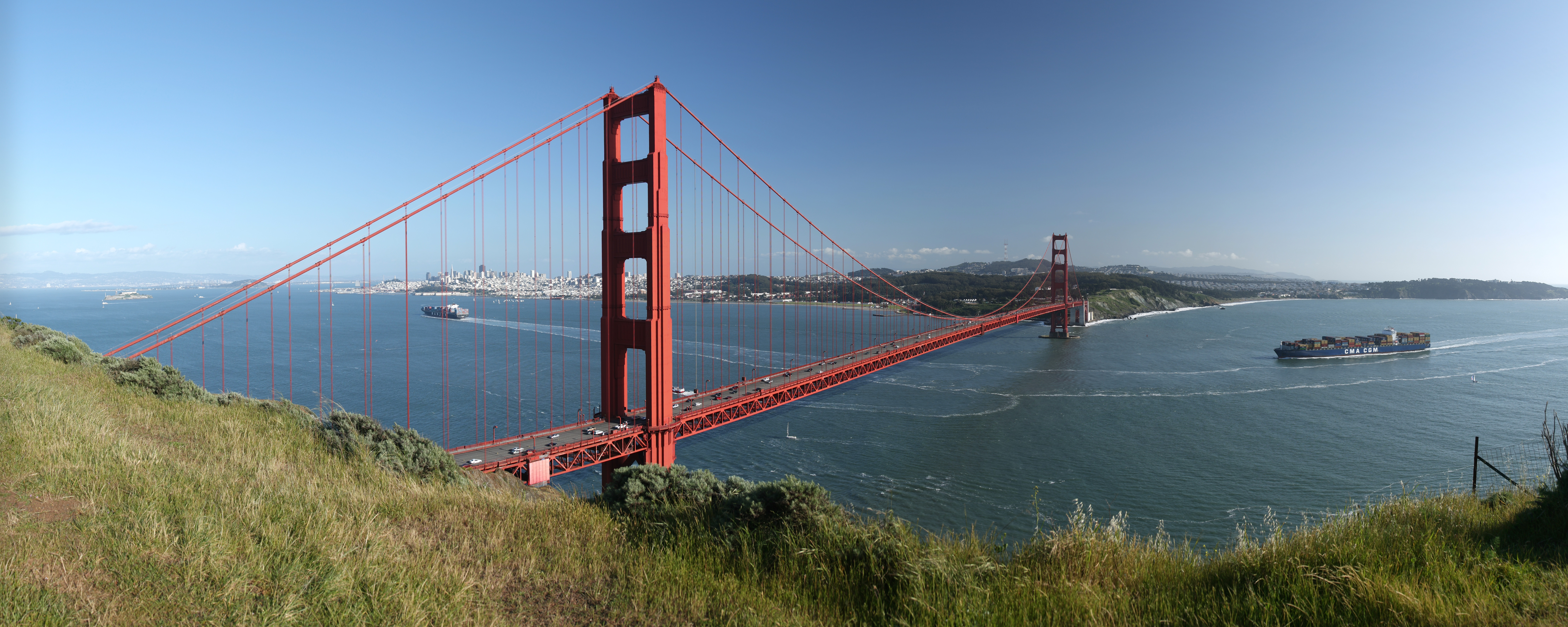
The Golden Gate Bridge

The Golden Gate Bridge is the most instantly recognizable structure in the city of San Francisco. The bridge spans almost two miles across the Golden Gate, the narrow strait where San Francisco Bay opens to meet the Pacific Ocean, connecting the city with Marin County, California.

The concept of a Golden Gate Bridge started with a journalist named James Wilking. Wilking promoted the idea that a bridge across the Golden Gate would bring many benefits. The idea for this bridge had surfaced forty years earlier, but over time people had lost interest, at least until Wilking revived the idea. In 1919, authorities commissioned Joseph Strauss to conduct a survey of the proposed site for the bridge. The main argument in favor of the bridge's construction was that it would help encourage development north of San Francisco.

Strauss became fascinated with the bridge, and began drawing up plans and making calculations for the bridge's construction. After 10 years of planning, the Golden Gate Bridge Company was formed and Strauss was appointed chief engineer for the project. Engineers Charles Alton Ellis and Irving Morrow also joined the project, with Ellis being appointed as the San Francisco representative. These three men can be credited for the design elements featured in the Golden Gate today.

By 1930, the Golden Gate project had gained sufficient support from the public to ensure passage of a $35 million bond to finance the construction of the bridge. Construction of the bridge started in 1933 and would last until May 27, 1937. It was the longest suspension bridge in the world upon its completion and was considered a masterful feat of architectural engineering, designed to hold 5,700 lb/ft on its roadway and 2,000 lb/ft on its walkways.

== Gallery ==
Examples of architecture in San Francisco
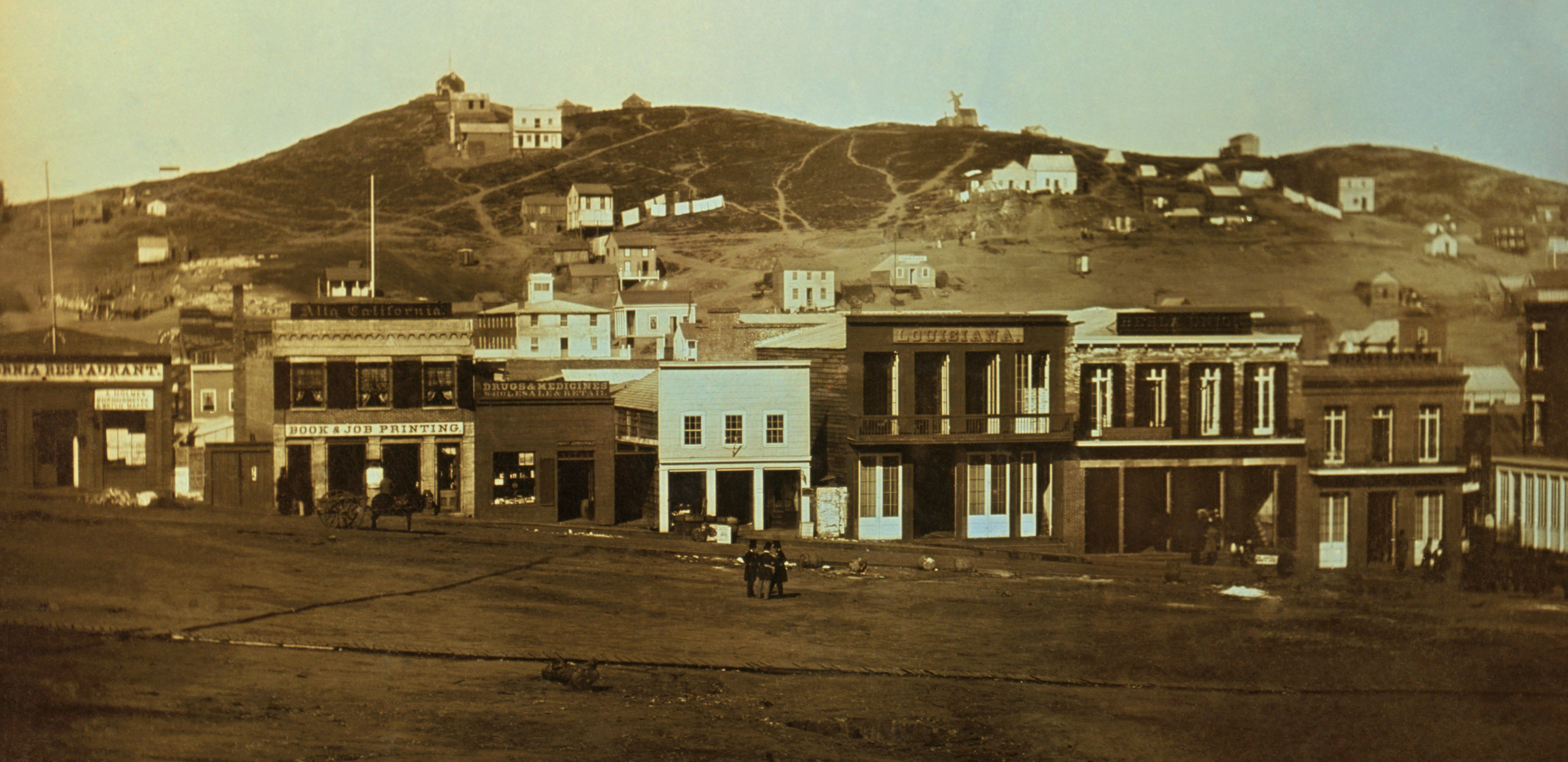
San Francisco in 1851

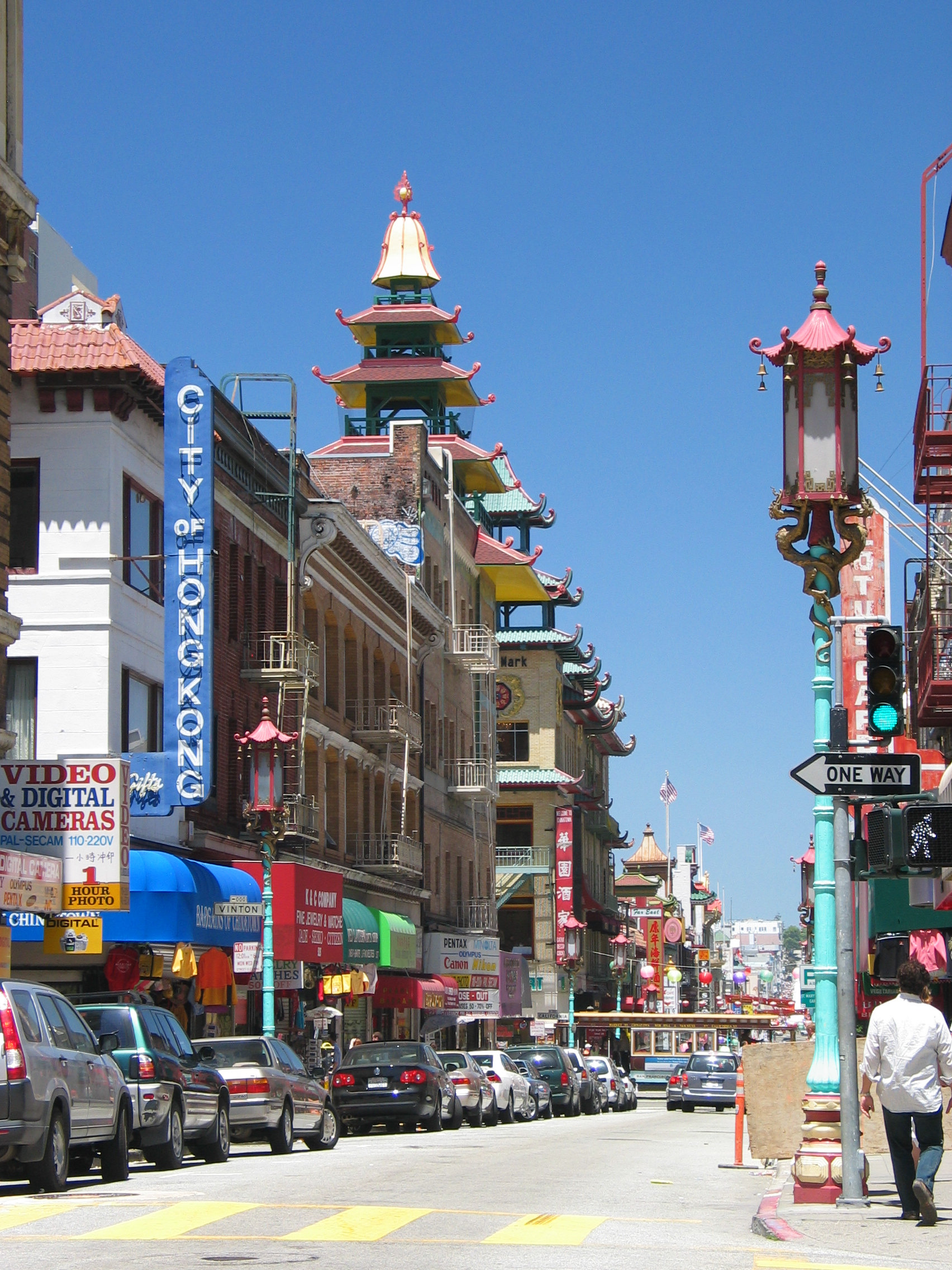
San Francisco's Chinatown is the oldest and one of the largest in North America.

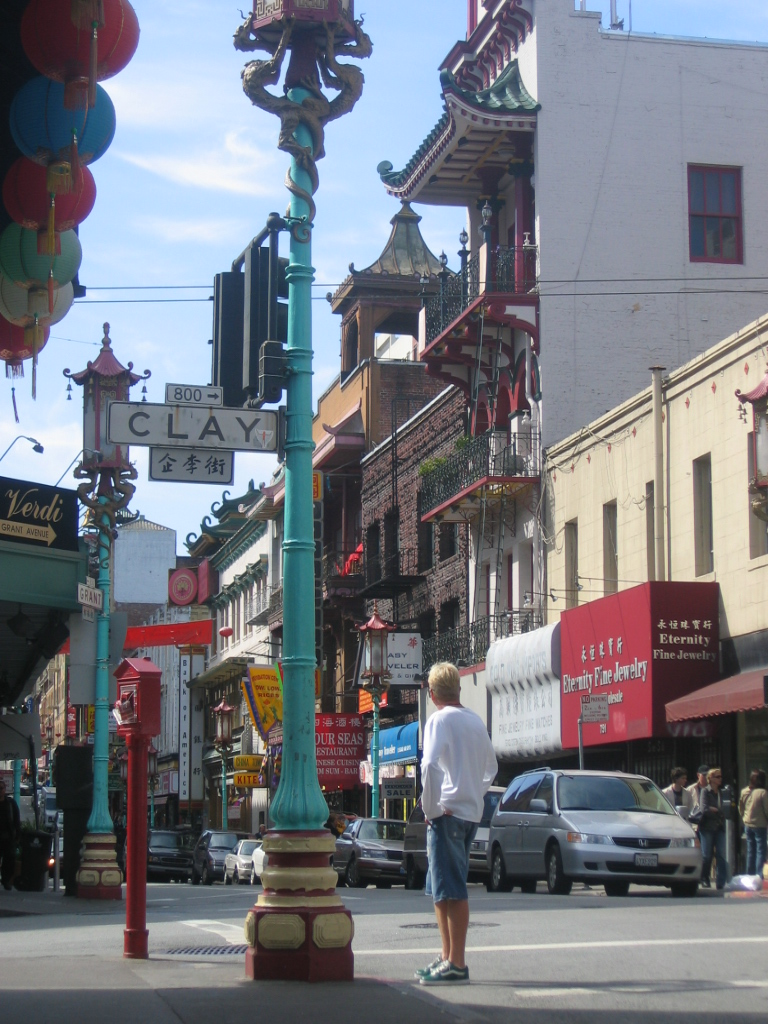
Chinatown at the intersection of Clay Street and Grant Avenue, which is one of the oldest streets in Chinatown

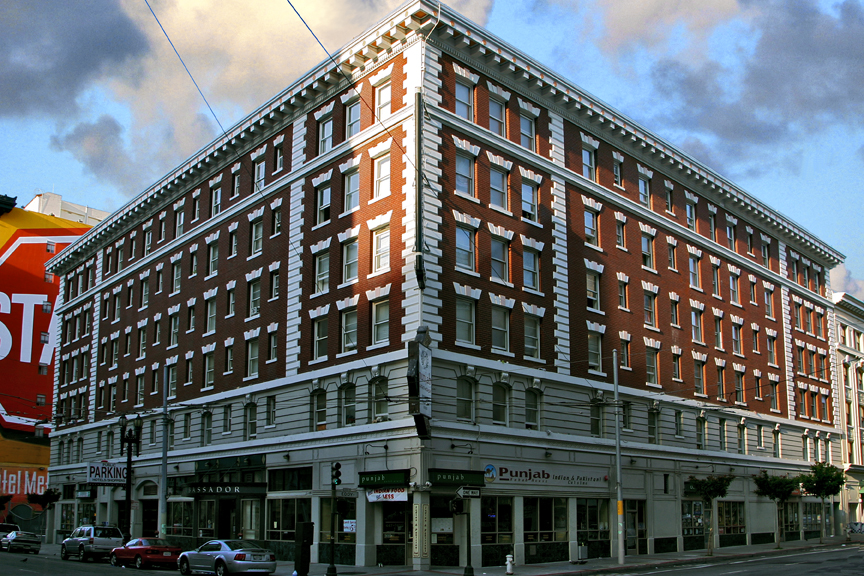
The Ambassador Hotel is an example of the architecture closer to downtown.

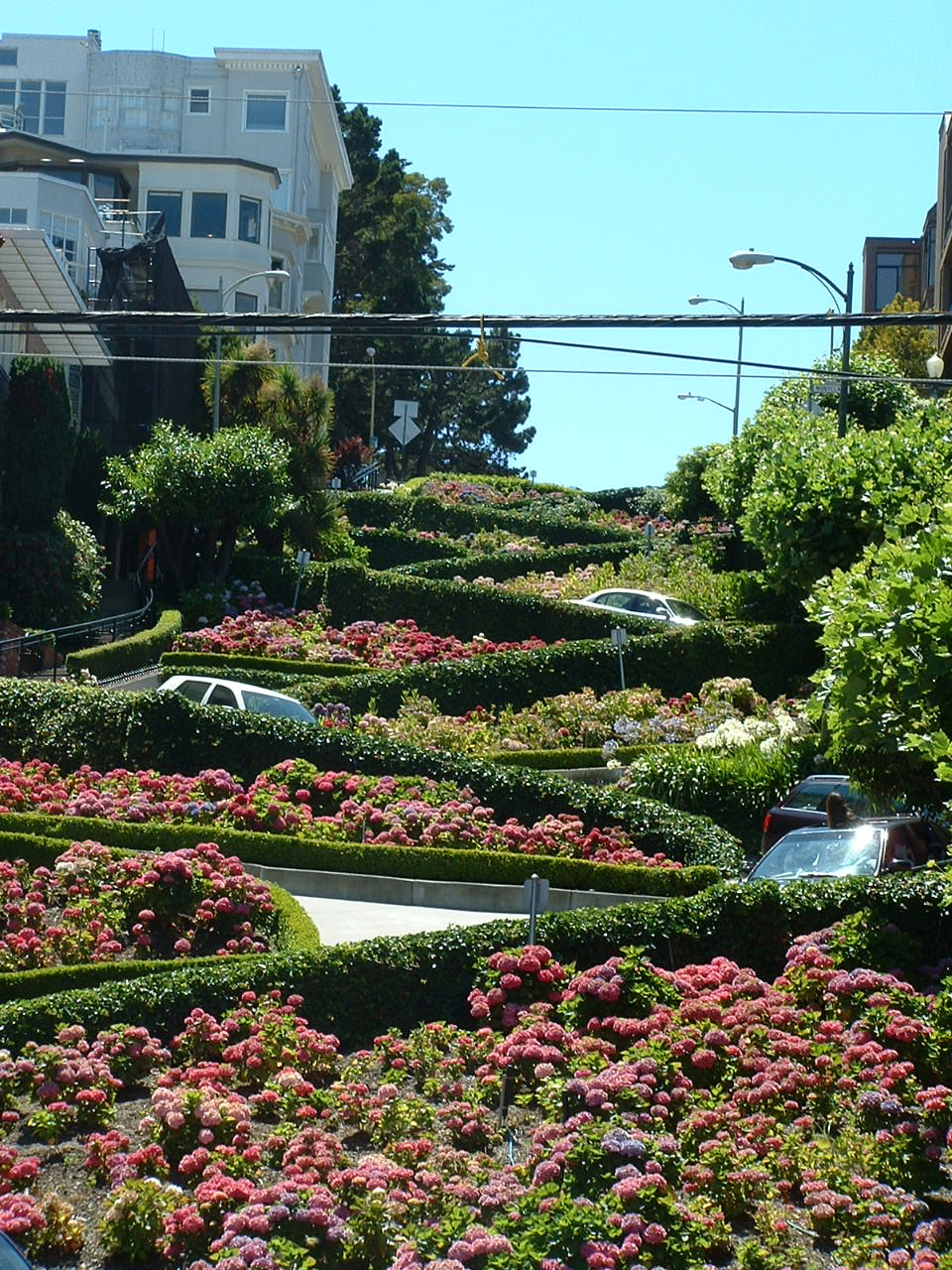
Cars navigate Lombard Street to descend Russian Hill.

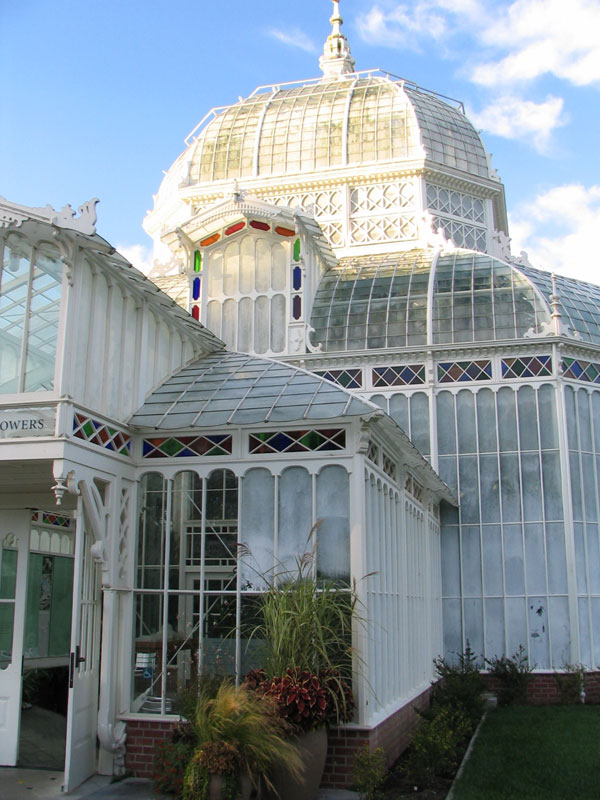
The Conservatory of Flowers (front entrance) in Golden Gate Park

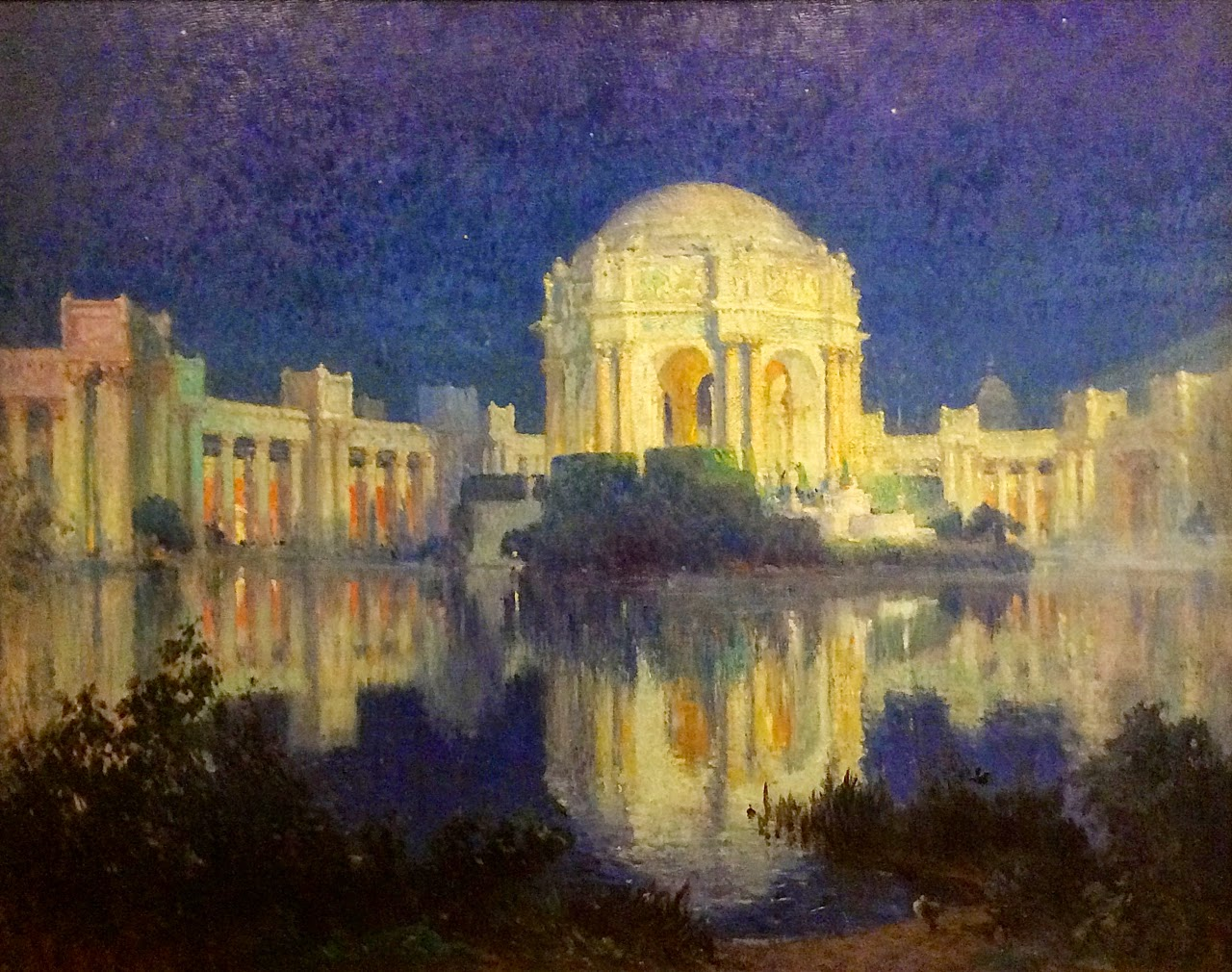
The Palace of Fine Arts at the 1915 Panama-Pacific Exposition, painted by Colin Campbell Cooper

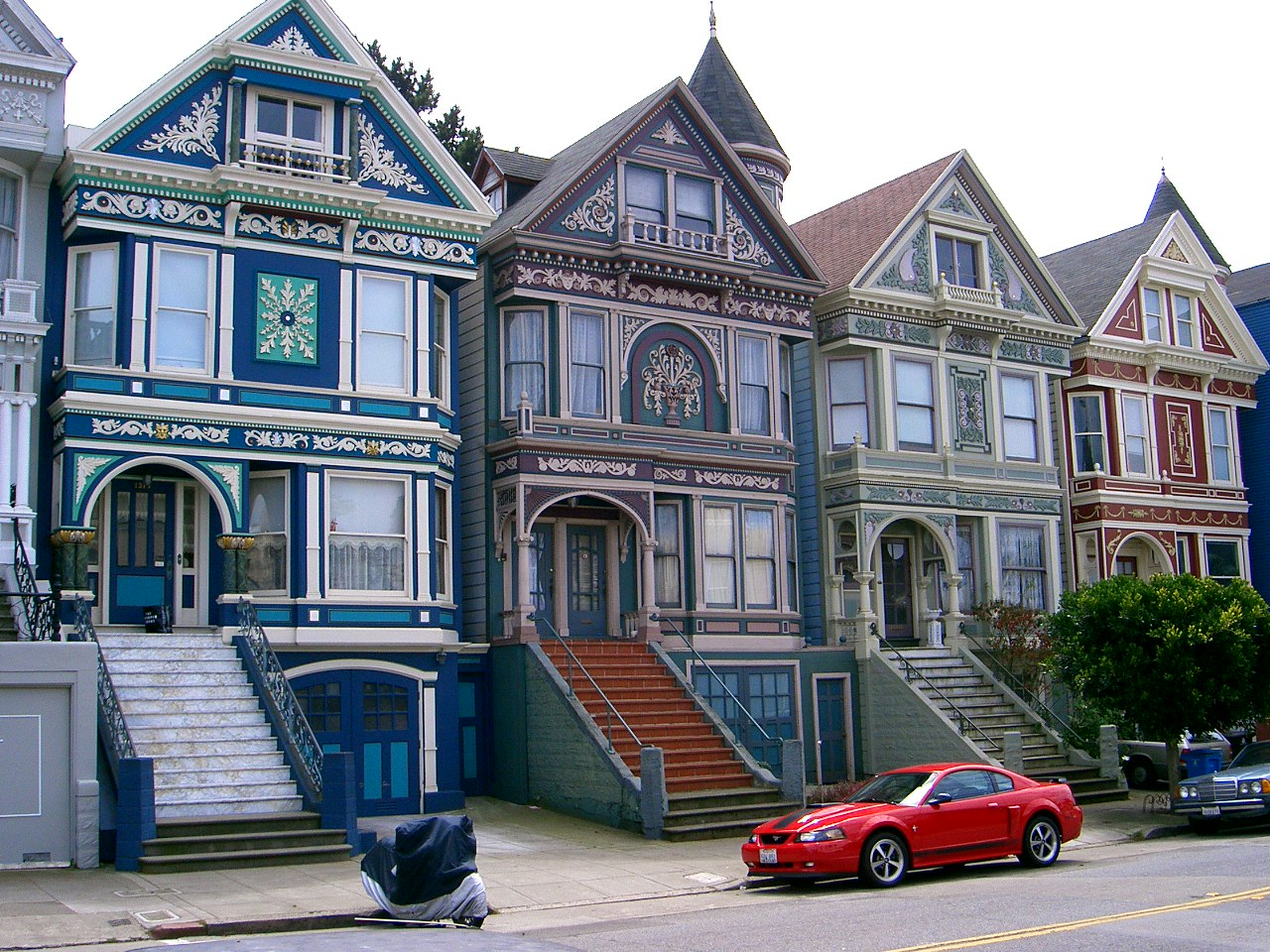
These Victorian rowhouses are in the Haight-Ashbury neighborhood of San Francisco, California.

== See also ==
- History of San Francisco
- Neighborhoods in San Francisco
- List of tallest buildings in San Francisco
- Painted Ladies
- William Abbenseth, photographer of San Francisco architecture
