= Pinoy Big Brother: Teen Edition Plus =

- Season 2
- Presented by: Toni Gonzaga; Bianca Gonzalez; Mariel Rodriguez; Luis Manzano
- No. of days: 77
- No. of housemates: 14
- Winner: Ejay Falcon
- Runner-up: Robi Domingo

Release
- Original network: ABS-CBN
- Original release: March 23 – June 7, 2008

Season chronology
- ← Previous; Teen Edition 1 Next → Teen Clash 2010

The second season of the reality game show Pinoy Big Brother: Teen Edition (subtitled as "Teen Edition Plus") aired ABS-CBN for 77 days from March 23 to June 7, 2008.

Ejay Falcon emerged as the season's winner, while Robi Domingo was the runner-up. Nicole Uysiuseng and Beauty Gonzalez were the finalists.

== Overview ==
On March 4, 2008, local news on ABS-CBN reported that Big Brother had already sent 30 Dream Keys along with special instructions in a sealed envelope. The instructions told the receiver that they must go to the final casting call in Manila without public information. From these thirty who answered the casting call, fourteen were chosen to enter the house.

A special primer called The BIGginning was aired on March 16, 2008. It showed the selection process used to choose the fourteen official housemates. While their faces were blurred to withhold their identities, a few of them were eventually shown and their names revealed as Big Brother told them of their rejection through his Big Red Phone.

=== Hosts ===
Toni Gonzaga returned as primetime host; this was also the first Teen Edition that she would be hosting. Mariel Rodriguez, the previous Teen Edition primetime host, also returned to host the late afternoon edition, Pinoy Big Brother: Teen Edition Season 2 Über. Bianca Gonzalez once again hosted the show's Update skits after being the regular host of Über in the second Celebrity Edition; she once hosted the Update slot back in the second regular season. Luis Manzano made his return to the show as Gonzaga's alternate host/co-host in the primetime edition; he appeared previously as co-host in a live airing of first Celebrity Edition.

=== House theme ===
The primer also revealed the new look of the House interior, which Manzano described as having a "funky, modern Moroccan" design with more elegant and colorful furnishings. Also, the "garden" was dominated by a large swimming pool. Furthermore, the new housemates entered the House area through the facade instead of the Eviction Hall as housemates in the second regular edition and the second Celebrity Edition did.

Also, what used to be the activity area was a part of the House called a "Plus Base." It had additional bedrooms, a garden, and a jacuzzi; it was occupied by the Guardians. Conversely, part of the Eviction Hall was renovated into the new activity area.

=== Theme song ===
Unlike Pinoy Ako and Sikat ang Pinoy, both of which were rehashed, the original Kabataang Pinoy by Itchyworms was used for this season without any alterations. A remixed version of the song (which combines its beat with those of Crank That and Smack That to name a few) was used throughout the opening night.

=== Prizes ===
The prizes offered for the winner were a laptop, an LCD TV set, kitchen appliances, a business showcase, a condominium, and ₱1,000,000 cash prize.

While the second, third, and fourth big placers received ₱500,000, ₱300,000, and ₱200,000 cash respectively. And all big placers also received a laptop and kitchen appliances.

== Format ==
=== "Plus" Twists ===
There are several reasons the word "Plus" was added to the edition name. One, as had been already stated, was Luis's return to the show. The second reason was the two housemates added to the announced twelve, both connected to the storied Ateneo-La Salle rivalry. The third was the secret area Luis revealed during the opening night of the edition. These rooms were occupied by the Housemates' Guardians, who were also the fourth reason. The fifth reason was the two House Players, whose function was similar to America's Player in the eighth season of the American version.

- Guardians: On Day 7, fourteen adults entered the House and, in a similar rein to the Big Mother concept of the Greek version, these "Guardians" (as the program calls them) are in the House to watch over the Housemates. There will be also a Guardian Big 4 and Guardian Big Winner, which will be independent from the Teen Big 4 and Teen Big Winner.
- Immunity Challenges: Several challenges were held in the house which granted immunity from being nominated to the winner.
- House Players: Similar to America's Player featured in Big Brother 8 (U.S.), the House Players each attempted a series of tasks for two weeks each based on the results of an SMS viewer poll. The House Players were rewarded P10,000 each for every task they complete.
- Teen Grand Council: The final five housemates were faced by former housemates, house players and guardians by being asked by them regarding issues they had in the past weeks.
- International Voting: Viewers in the United Arab Emirates could vote the same way those in the Philippines do through the network provider Etisalat.

== Housemates ==
A total of fourteen housemates entered the house on Day 1, which was March 23, 2008. Twelve were announced to come in, but two were added because of the connection of their schools. The housemates are ordered here according to their entry into the House. Meanwhile, the ages indicated were the ages of the said housemate upon entrance to the house, and the origin indicates where the housemates were born or based before joining the program.

Name	Age on entry	Hometown	Entered	Exited	Result
Ejay Falcon	18	Oriental Mindoro	Day 1	Day 77	Winner
Robi Domingo	18	Quezon City	Day 1	Day 77	Runner-up
Nicole Uysiuseng	17	Cebu	Day 1	Day 77	3rd Place
Christine "Beauty" Gonzalez	16	Dumaguete	Day 1	Day 77	4th Place
Alex Anselmuccio	15	Milan, Italy	Day 1	Day 74	Evicted
Nan Clenuar	13	Davao City	Day 1	Day 70	Evicted
Valerie Weigmann	18	Wiesbaden, Germany	Day 1	Day 67	Evicted
Rona Libby	16	Dumaguete	Day 1	Day 64	Evicted
Priscilla Navidad	19	Davao	Day 1	Day 56	Evicted
Josef Elizalde	17	Mandaluyong	Day 1	Day 49	Evicted
Jolas Paguia	14	Guiguinto, Bulacan	Day 1	Day 42	Evicted
Kevin Garcia-Flood	18	Madrid, Spain	Day 1	Day 35	Voluntary exit
Linda Backlund	16	Iriga City	Day 1	Day 26	Voluntary exit
Jieriel Papa	13	Davao City	Day 1	Day 21	Evicted

=== Guardians ===
On Day 7, fourteen adults entered the House and, in a similar rein to the Big Mother concept of the Greek version, these "Guardians" (as the program calls them) are in the House to watch over the Housemates. Their entry also aims to have viewers know the Housemates better through the Guardians. These Guardians will be in the House for a limited time; but if one Housemate's Guardian willingly decides to leave the House or is forced out of the House, a Forced Eviction will be imposed on that Housemate. If the Housemate is evicted, the Housemate's Guardian also gets evicted. Also, in a similar rein, the Housemate will undergo a punishment for whatever violation the Housemate's Guardian has committed.

Of the fourteen Guardians, twelve are parents, one is a close relative and another is a good acquaintance. They are listed below in order of their introduction:

- Boy (Robi's father)
- Anna (Josef's aunt)
- Ningning (Linda's mother)
- Gerry (Jieriel's stepfather)
- Carina (Beauty's mother)
- Rose (Rona's mother)
- Sandy (Nicole's mother)
- Ike (Jolas's father)
- My Love (Nan's mother)
- Erning (Ejay's "father"; in reality, his foster father)
- Violy (a friend of Valerie's mother whom Valerie calls her "second mother")
- Jinky (Priscilla's mother)
- Minda (Alex's mother)
- John (Kevin's father)

On Day 27 (April 18, 2008), Big Brother revealed to the Guardians that the top four Guardians would also receive cash prizes; each cash prize is valued at half of the counterpart Big 4 Teen Housemate would receive as well as other prizes. The Guardian Big Four's prizes are separate from those of their wards.

On Day 57, through a viewer poll, Erning was proclaimed the Guardian Big Winner, garnering 65.16% of the vote. He and the last three Guardians exited the House on that day, leaving the House once again to the teen housemates.

=== House Players ===
Similar to America's Player featured in Big Brother 8 (U.S.), the House Players each attempted a series of tasks for two weeks each based on the results of an SMS viewer poll. The House Players were rewarded P10,000 each for every task they complete.

Farina "Shy" Runkle was the show's first House Player. Aside from the fact that she is a teenager from Pasay City who was once a poker dealer, not much else is known about her as she always wore a mask to conceal her identity during her first week in the House. She once joined Starstruck on GMA 7 but failed to advance. She won a total of P40,000 for her efforts. She exited on Day 51 due to homesickness and the pressures inside the House.

Shy was joined by a second House Player, Andrea "Andi" Eigenmann, daughter of actors Mark Gil and Jaclyn Jose, whom Shy would help for the next five tasks. She exited the House on Day 53 due to the same reasons as Shy. Because of her short stay and the failure of her first and only task, she did not earn anything. Furthermore, she was excluded from any gatherings for ex-housemates from that point onwards.

Due to Shy's early exit, a Third House player, the portly Mikan Ong from Olongapo City, entered the House to take over Shy's role in assisting Andi. He is one of the 16 Dream Key holders who were not chosen as official housemates. Like Shy during her first week and unlike Andi (because of her showbiz connections), Mikan wore a mask to hide part of his face, but soon took it off. For his efforts, he won P20,000. He was purposely left behind in Palawan on Day 62, signalling the end of his role.

== Chronology of important events ==
This section lists important events and occurrences of violations and excluding the usual nomination and eviction nights. In this case, Day 1 is March 23, 2008.

=== Week 1 ===
- Day 1: The housemates entered the House one after the other. They were then welcomed by Big Brother, who gave them four points which actually summed up the official House rules.
- Day 2: Alex and Josef committed the same violation in two separate times: Alex whispered something to Jolas during a daily task and Josef doing the same to Kevin while everyone was inside the boys' bedroom. The two were punished by having them talk in a shouting manner. Wanting to partake on Josef's punishment, Robi was allowed by Big Brother to do so by acting as Josef's "echo."
- Day 3: Beauty and Robi committed a violation by mouthing of words after the lip reading activity. Their punishment would be meted out in a later time.
- Day 4: Ejay said during his daily confession that he already knows his true identity – that he is an adopted child, and his biological father is French. However, his surrogate father does not know the matter.
- Day 7: Because of the various violations committed during the week, the housemates had to form and even hold a giant red styrofoam egg together (reminiscent of Humpty Dumpty). Later, unbeknownst to the Housemates, who were having a chat with host Toni, the Guardians entered the House in groups. Once in the Plus Base, the Guardians were greeted by Big Brother and were given a few reminders.

=== Week 2 ===
- Day 8: Alex had made his decision to undergo circumcision during his stay in the House. This came exactly a week after he unwittingly included the Filipino word supot (uncircumcised) in his vocabulary of Filipino words, and then revealed that he did not go through the informal Filipino rite of passage because it is not a common practice among Italian men. Later, Ejay told the truth about his identity to his foster father Erning; the two, though, vowed to each other that the filial love they have would not change.
- Day 9: A special graduation ceremony was held for Robi, Jieriel, and Rona in the activity area, attended by their parents, their fellow housemates, and the principals of their respective schools, as well as host Bianca and first Teen Edition second placer Mikee Lee. This was made possible because the Guardians completed the other housemates' secret sacrifice (wire 1,500 notebooks), in which they were not able to finish on time.
- Day 10: As part of April Fools' Day, Alex, Jolas, and Nicole managed to fool their fellow housemates by having Alex pretending to cry. But after Jolas and Alex were first sent to the confession room to talk to Big Brother, and then to the storage room so the two could talk about the result of the joke, Big Brother finally had Minda enter the main House area to be with her son Alex and the other housemates. Sandy and Ike were later told to follow suit. In the evening, after everybody else had fallen asleep, Josef and Beauty were given a secret task to explore the Plus Base.
- Day 11: With the other male housemates as witnesses, Alex finally had his circumcision, done by Boy, a surgeon by trade, with the assistance of Jinky, a degree holder in nursing. After the procedure, all male housemates wore long skirts (said to aerate the private parts to help heal the wounds from the operation) so Alex won't be left out among the boys. Minda, Sandy, and Ike bade goodbye to the housemates and returned to the Plus Base. In the evening, on the continuation of their secret task, Josef and Beauty, as directed by Big Brother, woke up Jieriel and Kevin to accompany them to the Plus Base and back.
- Day 12: While the teen housemates were asleep, the Guardians were given the opportunity to use the swimming pool for 45 minutes, to which they complied. Later, as the last part of their secret task, Beauty, Josef, Jieriel, and Kevin secretly brought clothes with them and stayed with the Guardians in the Plus Base. This was to let the four know the Guardians better for an important event to be held later in the week. Later, Priscilla and Valerie talked about Priscilla feeling good about Beauty, Josef, Jieriel, and Kevin's absence and Priscilla deciding on whom she would give her nomination points, though no names were mentioned. Their conversation put them in the list of nominees by Big Brother.
- Day 13: Josef, Kevin, Jieriel, and Beauty were made members of a Teen Council by Big Brother to decide the fate of the Guardians. After a discussion in the secret room, the Teen Council decided that Violy, Rose, and Jinky would be evicted from the House.
- Day 14: The results of the Teen Council vote were announced later that evening; each of the three evicted Guardians mentioned above had 100 seconds with their wards Valerie, Rona, and Priscilla respectively at the confession room before leaving the House altogether. Their exit did not affect the statuses of the teen housemates in any way. Nan, Robi, and Alex were then selected by Big Brother for a secret task; the three did not know they had been selected as the new Teen Council.

=== Week 3 ===
- Day 15: Josef had his mouth closed and ribbons were wrapped around his head. This was punishment after his aunt Anna opened the decorated box while the Guardians were using the swimming pool.
- Day 17: In the evening, with the help of Big Brother and the other female housemates, Linda's father Hans, who was flown in from Norway, entered the House to surprise her on his birthday. Not only did the two spent the night with each other, but also slept in the living room together.
- Day 18: As part of the secret task, Alex and Robi purposely left Nan hiding in the Plus Base to be with the Guardians. Nan and Guardians were tasked to teach him nursery rhymes so he could return to the main House area, but the task was a failure. Meanwhile, Ningning and Hans were finally brought together in the main House area to talk each other, the first time to do so peacefully in three years since their separation. Later, while Ejay and Jolas were deeply sleeping in the area near the kitchen, as the boys agreed beforehand, Robi, Alex, Josef, and Kevin dragged them to the Plus Base (as tasked by Big Brother) so Nan could return to the main House area.
- Day 19: Because of the task mentioned above, Ejay and Jolas found themselves in the Plus Base with the Guardians, and thus spent their time with them. The Guardians were later joined by Ningning and Hans, who spent their night in the main House area with Linda.
- Day 20: Ejay and Jolas finally returned to the main House area after passing a bread-baking task. Their output has halved between the Guardians and the housemates.

=== Week 4 ===
- Day 22: The Teen Council, now composed of original members Beauty, Josef, and Kevin, and new members Robi, Alex, Nan, Jolas, and Ejay, voted to evict Robi's father from the House. Boy was informed of his eviction minutes before the nominations were announced. Like Violy, Rose, and Jinky before him, he had his 100 seconds with his son Robi before leaving the House.
- Day 23: Seeing that the housemates were leaving their vegetable supply almost untouched, Big Brother tasked the housemates to prepare only vegetable dishes of their meals. In the evening, Linda, Valerie, Priscilla, Nicole, and Rona were placed in the Plus Base as part of a scare prank task. The scary scenery, and the scarings of both their fellow housemates and the Guardians failed to frighten the five, although Rona's fear of ghosts got the better of her. They were thus prevented to stay longer in the Plus Base and know more about its inhabitants.
- Day 24: Linda, Valerie, Priscilla, Nicole, and Rona tried to resolve the issue of the missing cup noodles, as told by Big Brother the night before. While Kevin and Beauty swore they saw Priscilla and Valerie eat the noodles, no resolution was reached, rescinding any more chances of the last five females to know more about the Plus Base. Later, the housemates gave up their meat supply after losing a game involving vegetable dishes. In the evening, Anna expressed her desire to make a voluntary exit due to medical and emotional reasons. Since her nephew's status in the House would be affected, Josef was informed about this and aunt and nephew talk about it. Josef was OK about the idea of him and his aunt leaving together at any time she wanted due to his concern. This and Linda's pending response to Big Brother's offer of an all-expenses-paid vacation with her entire family became the reasons all voting was suspended for the week. Much later, as directed by Big Brother, John asked his fellow Guardians if they would like to live in the House area; only John and Minda took the offer and stayed with the teen housemates. In turn, all female housemates except Beauty were told to move to the "other room" (the Plus Base) and solve the mystery of its inhabitants in 24 hours.
- Day 25: Second Celebrity Edition housemate Jon Avila, dressed as the title character of the upcoming show Kapitan Boom, surprised Beauty by personally giving her two packaged boxes, which later turned out to contain more vegetables for lunch and dinner. Wanting to spend more time with her entire family, Linda decided to sacrifice her stay and take Big Brother's offer of a vacation for her entire family. Later, Kevin and John's discussion about circumcision and Kevin's refusal to undergo it became so heated, Kevin was already tinkering the idea of leaving himself. Kevin was first placed in the Plus Base with Linda, Valerie, Priscilla, Nicole, and Rona. Soon, the switch was executed, with the Guardians staying in the main House area and the teen housemates in the Plus Base.
- Day 26: Beauty was told to return to the main House area to be with her mother Carina, who was affected by the tensions by Anna and John. Soon after informing the others that she was leaving, Linda was given a send-off party by her fellow housemates. Ningning tagged along with her daughter and both left the House with the rest of the family.
- Day 27: Big Brother announced to the Guardians that even the top four of them would receive cash prizes. With everyone else deciding to stay on, Anna was given the condition to convince her brother-in-law (Josef's father) to take over her place. Anna later decided to give herself a second chance and stay in the House a little bit longer. Beauty was reunited with her fellow housemates in the Plus Base.
- Day 28: Big Brother reported to Josef that his aunt will not go through with her voluntary exit. But Josef was then told to stay with the Guardians so he could talk with her.

=== Week 5 ===
- Day 29: Luis, who would have his birthday the next day, was invited into the House by Big Brother and the female housemates to personally blow the candles on the cake they prepared for him. It turned out to be a ruse to trap Luis inside the House. Toni took over his job of announcing the nominees. Luis stayed in the House for only a few hours until he was told that he could leave.
- Day 30: Second regular season housemates Saicy Aguila and Mickey Perz, each accompanied by a dance partner, were in the House to teach the teen housemates and Guardians respectively for their weekly tasks for the first time. Later, as part of Kevin and John's sacrifice for the circumcision of 100 Filipino boys, all male housemates and Guardians (with the exception of the already-bald John) were given unusual haircuts. John was told to sport a long wig until further notice.
- Day 31: Josef's actions earned John's ire, resulting in another shouting match between Anna and John, to the point of Josef punching the door to the confession room in anger. To calm Josef down, he was told to rejoin his fellow teen housemates. Later, Anna joined her nephew as per Big Brother's instructions after overhearing John's rants against her. Meanwhile, Ejay and Valerie continued gluing a shattered cup together again while their hands strapped to each other as punishment for shattering the cup the night before. In the evening, the teen housemates and Guardians moved back to their former bases. The teen housemates then held a discussion on how to help ease tensions among the Guardians.
- Day 32: Kevin and John agreed to exit the House together at a later time, Kevin because of what his fellow housemates saw against him and John for the extreme culture shock resulting in his hostilities with Anna and Carina. Later, James Yap and Peter June Simon of the Purefoods Tender Juicy Giants played a basketball game against Jolas and Ike; the visitors won 78-69. In the evening, as part of a prize, John and Kevin dined with Kim Chiu exactly two years after she herself entered the House in the first Teen Edition, which she eventually won.
- Day 35: On what everybody else knew was a normal eviction ceremony, Big Brother formally announced Kevin and John's departure from the House. Kevin and John traded hugs and farewells before they left.

=== Week 6 ===
- Day 37: Several housemates were dressed up as human roosters for waking up late and in the wrong bed and for moving the table, as investigated by Robi. Josef was also made to wear goggles with little aquariums (complete with fish) attached after his aunt Anna wore sunglasses inside the House several times when not permitted.
- Day 39: After finding out from Robi that leftovers had been rotting inside the refrigerator, Big Brother told Robi to return everything inside the refrigerator, both fresh and rotting, to the storage area. Big Brother would then mete out the food they would eat. Robi and Alex were later sent to the hospital as the latter was not feeling well and the former was experiencing slight pains in his hands. It was determined that Robi just had muscle strain so he was sent back. Meanwhile, Alex was diagnosed with viral gastroenteritis and had to be left behind in the hospital for rest and treatment.
- Day 40: During a late afternoon game, Beauty slipped and fell on her seat, experiencing extreme pain on her lower back as a result. She was rushed to the hospital in a stretcher due to the pain and was confined there while awaiting for the results of her x-ray and MRI scans. Carina was informed about this and was told to pack up her things so she could accompany her in the hospital. Alarmed at the number of housemates getting sick, Big Brother disallowed the housemates from using the swimming pool (which was contaminated with urine, eventually causing Alex's ailment) and told them to use their own utensils and plates and sit on their own places while eating. Ejay was also told to scoop out all of the water in the swimming pool using a dipper so the water would be replaced later. Alex returned to the House moments before his 24-hour deadline elapsed.
- Day 41: It was determined by doctors that Beauty's accident only caused a muscular strain on her lower back and there were no fractures whatsoever on her spine. She and her mother returned to the House in the afternoon. Later Mariel, Luis, and Bianca had separate pajama parties with the housemates; Mariel and Bianca were with the girls at the confession room while Luis hung out with the boys at their bedroom.

=== Week 7 ===
- Day 43: A masquerade ball was held inside the House. Shy, the House Player, entered the House during the celebration and received her first task soon after.
- Day 44: In the wee hours of the morning, Priscilla told several of the other female housemates about Shy's potential as a troublemaker. Because of this, Priscilla and Beauty later had a heated argument with Rona for her perceived siding with Shy.
- Day 45: Big Brother derided Priscilla, Beauty, Nicole, and Valerie for their being judgemental on Shy, especially on Priscilla's statement on her. Because of this, the four reconciled with Rona and then opened up with Shy. Later, first Teen Edition housemate Joaqui Mendoza entered the House, obviously unfamiliar with its new layout and its new tenants. He followed orders of first regular season housemate Jason Gainza through a device on his ear, kept hidden by his hooded sweater. Big Brother then exploited Joaqui's fear of mice by having him open a box containing one, causing a ruckus among everyone in the House. Because of Jason's ineptness in sending instructions to Joaqui, the two were told to switch places, leaving Jason to enter the main House area and communicate with the housemates. Later, Josef was told by Big Brother to stay away from Nicole because of the two being too close, causing Nicole's mother Sandy to worry about Josef and Nicole's separate "commitments" outside the House. After getting permission from Big Brother, Josef told Alex about his predicament so the latter could help.
- Day 47: As Priscilla's prize for winning a late-afternoon game, she and Rona left the House and visited Manila Ocean Park. They returned two hours later.
- Day 48: Concerned about Ejay's welfare in performing his punishment, Josef, Nan, and Alex were permitted to help Ejay by each giving them plastic spoons as scoopers. The four boys' efforts paid off and the punishment of filling the water drum 50 times with water from the swimming pool was finished. Big Brother thus lifted the ban on using the pool.
- Day 49: Having succeeded in keeping her mask on for almost the whole week, Shy was finally permitted to show her entire face to the housemates.

=== Week 8 ===
- Day 50: Rona had a 100-second encounter with her mother Rose as her prize for a Mother's Day-related task among housemates whose mothers are in the outside world. After the announcement of automatic nominations only to the viewers, Shy was joined by the new House Player Andi. Later, Big Brother told the housemates that Shy and Andi were in the House because they would replace two evicted housemates. Hosts Luis and Bianca, however, immediately revealed that this was not a real announcement, but really a test to see whether the housemates' behavior would change on such a situation.
- Day 51: To prepare the housemates for their upcoming island adventure, members of the 505th Search and Rescue Brigade of the Philippine Air Force put the housemates into military training for the first time as part of their weekly task. Unable to hold the pressure much longer in front of the commanders, Shy decided to leave the House altogether. She immediately left after her last conversation with Big Brother. Andi was informed of her partner's departure later in the evening.
- Day 52: New House Player Mikan entered the House, cooked some breakfast, and personally woke up the housemates.
- Day 53: Andi decided to exit the house mostly due to emotional duress and homesickness, leaving the role of House Player solely to Mikan. In the evening, Robi, Valerie, Rona, and Priscilla were called to perform their duties as Teen Council. They each voiced their choice on whom they should evict, but the four later reconvened and agreed to send Sandy out of the House at the end of the week. The other housemates were informed of this, but Beauty was visibly not happy of the Teen Council's verdict because of her concern for her mother Carina. When Beauty was given the power to change the Teen Council's decision, she decided to have her mother leave instead, to which the Teen Council accepted.
- Day 54: One by one, Ejay, Nan, and Alex, announced to their Guardians their inclusion to the Guardian Big Four and brought them from the Plus Base into the main House area. Sandy and Carina were brought to the confession room, and there, Beauty told her sacrifice to change the Teen Council's verdict and have Carina out of the House, subsequently putting Sandy in the Guardian Big Four. After this, Sandy and Carina were also brought into the main House area where the Guardians would stay until their exit two and three days later.
- Day 55: A small party was held for the last five Guardians in the House.
- Day 56: Two days after receiving word that she was shut out of the Guardian Big Four, Carina was finally told to depart the House, leaving her daughter behind.

=== Week 9 ===
- Day 57: The Guardian Big Night was held. My Love, Sandy, Minda, and Erning (in that order) exited the House corresponding to their places, with Erning emerging as the Guardian Winner.
- Day 58: The remaining housemates were separated into two groups. Ejay, Valerie, Nan, and Beauty were whisked to an island in the National Park of Puerto Princesa, Palawan for their Island Adventure, accompanied by Big Brother. On the other hand, Robi, Rona, Alex, Nicole, and Mikan were left behind in the House, later to be accompanied by Primo, a Batak tribesman from Palawan, who taught them survival techniques.
- Day 60: After receiving instructions from Cyber Kuya (Big Brother's messenger who shows the instructions through the TV monitor), Robi, Rona, Nicole, Alex, and Mikan were sent to Palawan to join the four housemates already there for the Island Adventure. For the meantime, Guardians John, Minda, My Love, Jinky, and Rose returned to the House to take care of it in the teens and Big Brother's absence, as well as to keep Primo company until eventually he was sent off later in the afternoon.
- Day 62: The housemates (except Mikan) returned to the House from their Island Adventure in Palawan.
- Day 63: Mikan re-entered the House for 100 seconds, during which he had his things gathered and packed and gave a proper goodbye to the housemates.

=== Week 10 ===
- Day 64: In the morning, the housemates discovered that all the furniture in the house (except the large living room sofa and the side table where the picture frames are) were missing, thinking the finale was near. Later, after the announcement of nominations, Robi told Big Brother about the former's plan to make a voluntary exit.
- Day 65: Although Robi had reservations about the common good inside and outside of the House, he told Big Brother than he would continue his stay. Later, second Celebrity Edition housemate Gaby dela Merced taught the housemates how to drive a car as part of their weekly task.
- Day 69: TV host and animal conservationist Kim Atienza visited the House two years after he dropped by it along with several animals during the first Teen Edition. He was there to teach the housemates about the environment and guide them during the Matanglawin board game the teens played.
- Day 70: After the end of the small-scale part of the weekly task, all the House furniture was brought back to their proper places. Later, as part of the weekly task, two groups of housemates were alternately brought to a practice driving field for the practical part of their driving examination. Soon after Nan's exit, a face-to-face "final nomination round" took place wherein each housemate chose only one housemate whom they want to shut out of the "Big 4." The girls and Robi nominated Alex while Alex and Ejay named Nicole for eviction. Outpouring of emotions ensued afterwards. Unknown to them, the whole process was in fact not valid, and it was only done to test the characters of the housemates (see Nomination history below). The housemates were also told to complete the 1,000 bead necklaces that they did not finish as part of their ninth weekly task.

=== Week 11 ===
- Day 71: The remaining housemates were confronted and grilled by the Grand Council, composed of the evicted housemates and Guardians, to uncover their real personalities.
- Day 72: International R&B artist Flo Rida had a mini-concert inside the House with the housemates. He was in the Philippines for a three-day mall tour in several SM Supermalls. Later, the housemates gathered their garments (including underwear and footwear, but not the clothes they were wearing at the time) in one pile. They were then told to pour "gasoline" on the pile and ignite it, which not one of the housemates understandably did. Even Big Brother's offer of lifting Ejay, Robi, Beauty's "automatic nomination" as a reward for burning the pile fell into deaf ears. This was actually done to test the housemates' selflessness towards each other and their things.
- Day 73: The housemates were told to gather all of their clothes scattered at the pool area from behind the blue line in an hour. Whatever they didn't manage to save were placed inside garbage bags and placed next to two drums containing flames. Then, in the confession room, the housemates saw the garbage bags being burned (although in reality, those bags no longer contained their clothes but instead rags). After they were told to dress up and stay in the living area for a "live show," Big Brother then told the housemates the truth (no clothes were burned, nominations were fake, and there was no eviction on that day) and everything was a test in which they passed.
- Day 77: The final four housemates departed the House in silver cloaks and were presumably driven to the Araneta Coliseum.

== House Players tasks ==
Below are the descriptions of the questions from which the House Players would perform their tasks and the results of those tasks. The first five were performed by Shy, the sixth by Andi with Mikan's assistance and the succeeding ones by Mikan.

Task No.	Day announced	Description	Options	Viewers' selection	Result
1	Day 43 (May 4, 2008)	Shy must convince her fellow housemates that she has a crush on which male housemate?	Alex, Ejay, Josef, Nan, and Robi	Josef	Completed^{H1}
2	Day 44 (May 5, 2008)	On which sleeping housemate should Shy put the handcuffs?	Robi, Valerie, Alex	Robi	Failed^{H2}
3	Day 45 (May 6, 2008)	Shy must drive which male housemate mad?	Ejay, Alex, Nan	Nan	Completed^{H3}
4	Day 46 (May 7, 2008)	Shy must hide which housemate's possessions?	Valerie, Nicole, Alex	Nicole	Completed^{H4}
5	Day 47 (May 8, 2008)	Which housemate must Shy take as her best friend?	Beauty, Ejay, Alex	Beauty	Completed^{H5}
6	Day 50 (May 11, 2008)	Which housemate should become the victim of the House Players' "clumsiness"?	Alex, Ejay, Nan, Robi	Robi	Failed^{H6}
7	Day 51 (May 12, 2008)	Which housemate should the House Players amuse?	Priscilla, Valerie, Alex, Ejay	Ejay	Failed^{H7}
8	Day 52 (May 13, 2008)	On which housemate's fingernails should the House Players apply multi-colored nail polish while sleeping?	Rona, Priscilla, Valerie, Alex	Alex	Completed^{H8}
9	Day 54 (May 15, 2008)	To which housemate should Mikan open up?	Priscilla, Rona, Valerie	Rona	Completed^{H9}
10	Day 55 (May 16, 2008)	To which housemate should Mikan serve?	Valerie, Priscilla	Valerie	Failed^{H10}

- ^Note H1: For the task to be successful, the other housemates should talk about Shy's alleged attraction on Josef on their own.
- ^Note H2: Shy was not able to cuff even one of Robi's wrists since he managed to hide his hands in his shorts while sleeping during her attempts. She later told Big Brother that she gave up on cuffing him.
- ^Note H3: Shy's efforts to get into Nan's angry side succeeded in irking him and making him complain to Big Brother, which was enough for the task.
- ^Note H4: Shy hid most of Nicole's clothes all around the bedroom and Nicole was not able to find them until the end of the task, when Shy transferred those clothes to her luggage bag.
- ^Note H5: Three conditions for the success of the task were met: Shy did a favor for Beauty, Beauty opened up to Shy by talking about her father. Beauty also gave her blouse to Shy as a token of their friendship.
- ^Note H6: Andi managed to perform two of the acts for the success of the task: she spat water on Robi and later spilled coffee on his back. But neither she nor Mikan were able to perform the third act: step on Robi's big toe.
- ^Note H7: Mikan's efforts did not produce a hearty laugh from Ejay, which was required for the task.
- ^Note H8: Mikan managed to apply different colors of nail polish on both Alex's fingernails and toenails. Alex never noticed his nails were painted until one of his military trainers pointed them out to him the next morning.
- ^Note H9: After Mikan opened up to Rona, she hugged him. This was the requirement for the success of the task.
- ^Note H10: Mikan did things for Valerie. But even before she could return his favor, which was required for the success of the task, she was among the first four housemates whisked to Palawan.

The House Players were not official housemates as they left the House in the appropriate time and did not participate in the nomination procedure.

== Weekly tasks ==
Below is the list of weekly tasks performed by the housemates. Guardians also have weekly tasks; they are not listed here because those tasks determine who would play in the immunity game.

Task No.	Date given	Description	Bet	Result
1	March 23, 2008 (Day 01)	Robi and Josef must convince their fellow housemates that they are "Best Buds Forever." Part of this is to perform Quit Playing Games (with My Heart) and Crank That together.^{T1}	100%	Failed
2	March 31, 2008 (Day 09)	Do an "algorithm dance" to the tune of One Team Kapamilya, ABS-CBN's summer tune for 2008.	50%	Failed
3	April 8, 2008 (Day 17)	Tie-dye 1,000 T-shirts to be sold outside the House. These shirts should come out colorful. Sales of the T-shirts must accumulate P200,000, proceeds of which will be used for an upcoming medical mission.^{T2}	75%	Passed
4	April 14, 2008 (Day 23)	Study a maze while being blindfolded and holding walking canes without even touching its rope borders. On Friday, three of them should be chosen; they would be dressed as the Three Blind Mice and should travel the maze and finish it in the given time.^{T3}	50%	Failed
5	April 21, 2008 (Day 30)	Practice a samba routine and perform it on Friday.	50%	Passed^{T4}
6	April 28, 2008 (Day 37)	Control several remote-controlled cars along a designated race track.	60%	Passed^{T5}
7	May 5, 2008 (Day 44)	On Friday, four housemates should balance on top of a "fulcrum table" while turning around counterclockwise. The two housemates facing each other must change places. They have been given ample time to rehearse.	50%	Passed
8	May 12, 2008 (Day 51)	Earn and maintain at least 100 merit points during their military training by Friday.	100%	Passed^{T6}
9	May 19, 2008 (Day 58)	Make 1,000 bead necklaces that would be sold for charity.	60%	Failed
10	May 26, 2008 (Day 65)	Learn how to drive a car and pass written and practical tests based on what they learned.	100%	Failed

- ^Note T1: It is announced as both a secret task for Robi and Josef and as an "All or Nothing" weekly task.
- ^Note T2: The housemates were also divided into "Team Josef" and "Team Robi" for this task. The losing team would make an additional sacrifice for the medical mission stated. (Team Robi won over Team Josef, the latter did the sacrifice.)
- ^Note T3: Beauty, Rona, Nicole, Robi and Priscilla performed the task for all of the housemates.
- ^Note T4: Their teacher Saicy Aguila deemed their performance a successful one.
- ^Note T5: Big Brother deducted P1,000 because two housemates (Valerie and Nicole) each did not finish the course in the allotted time limit. Despite this, he still regarded the task as a success.
- ^Note T6: The Housemates collected an aggregate total of 176 merits, inclusive of demerits.

== Nomination History ==
The housemate first mentioned in each nomination gets two points, while the second gets one point. Guardians' nominations are independent of the housemates' nominations; the highest votes from the Guardians would be included in the list of nominees. In case the Guardians' nominee is already among the top two nominees named by housemates, the housemate with the third highest number of nomination points from the housemates' peers will be included.

Pinoy Big Brother: Teen Edition Plus nomination history
	#1	#2	#3	#4	#5	#6	#7	#8	#9	#10	BIG NIGHT	Nominations received
Eviction Day and Date	Day 21 April 12	Day 28 April 19	Day 35 April 26	Day 42 May 3	Day 49 May 10	Day 56 May 17	Day 63 May 24	Day 67 May 28	Day 70 May 31	Day 74 June 4	Day 77 June 7	Nominations received
Nomination day and Date	Day 5 March 27	Day 22; April 13	Day 29; April 20	Day 36; April 27	Day 44; May 5	Day 51; May 12	Day 58; May 19	Day 65; May 26	Day 68; May 29	Day 70; May 31		Nominations received
Ejay	Linda; Jieriel	Linda; Kevin	Nicole; Kevin	Josef; Rona	Nicole; Josef	No nominations	Robi; Rona	Robi; Nicole	Robi; Alex	No nominations	Winner	16 (+1; +8)
Robi	Josef; Linda	Josef; Kevin	Josef; Kevin	Rona; Josef	Nicole; Josef	No nominations	Ejay; Nicole	Ejay; Nan	Nan; Ejay	No nominations	Runner-Up	18 (+7)
Nicole	Ejay; Jieriel	Kevin; Linda	Kevin; Priscilla	Jolas; Robi	Ejay; Alex	Nominated	Robi; Valerie	Valerie; Nan	Ejay; Robi	No nominations	3rd Place	33 (+1; +2)
Beauty	Linda; Priscilla	Linda; Rona	Kevin; Priscilla	Jolas; Rona	Josef; Rona	Nominated	Rona; Valerie	Valerie; Nan	Nan; Alex	No nominations	4th Place	16 (+1; +8)
Alex	Linda; Josef	Linda; Nicole	Nicole; Valerie	Jolas; Nicole	Nicole; Josef	No nominations	Rona; Ejay	Nicole; Ejay	Beauty; Nicole	No nominations	Evicted (Day 74)	4 (+7)
Nan	Josef; Beauty	Kevin; Jolas	Josef; Kevin	Jolas; Josef	Josef; Rona	No nominations	Rona; Robi	Robi; Valerie	Robi; Alex	Evicted (Day 70)		10
Valerie	Nicole; Jieriel	Kevin; Nicole	Beauty; Kevin	Nicole; Josef	Nicole; Josef	No nominations	Nicole; Beauty	Nicole; Beauty	Evicted (Day 67)			13 (+1; +8)
Rona	Jieriel; Ejay	Kevin; Josef	Beauty; Kevin	Josef; Nicole	Beauty; Josef	No nominations	Beauty; Nicole	Evicted (Day 64)				20 (+6)
Priscilla	Jieriel; Beauty	Josef; Kevin	Nicole; Beauty	Josef; Nicole	Josef; Rona	Nominated	Evicted (Day 56)					6 (+2; +3)
Josef	Nan; Beauty	Kevin; Valerie	Kevin; Robi	Jolas; Rona	Robi; Rona	Evicted (Day 50)						41 (+15)
Jolas	Linda; Josef	Linda; Kevin	Kevin; Josef	Rona; Josef	Evicted (Day 42)							11
Kevin	Priscilla; Ejay	Linda; Priscilla	Josef; Rona	Voluntary Exit (Day 35)								29 (+4)
Linda	Valerie; Nan	Kevin; Josef	Voluntary Exit (Day 26)									20
Jieriel	Valerie; Josef	Evicted (Day 21)										7
Challenge Winner	Kevin	Ejay	Jolas	Beauty	Nan	none						
Erning	Not eligible		Josef; Alex	Alex; Robi	Nicole; Priscilla	No nominations	Guardian Winner (Exited, Day 57)					
Minda	Not eligible		Valerie; Priscilla	Valerie; Rona	Josef; Robi	No nominations	Runner-Up (Exited, Day 57)					
Sandy	Not eligible		Josef; Valerie	Josef; Rona	Beauty; Robi	No nominations	3rd Place (Exited, Day 57)					
My Love	Not eligible		Beauty; Josef	Valerie; Rona	Beauty; Josef	No nominations	4th Place (Exited, Day 57)					
Carina	Not eligible		Kevin; Rona	Robi; Priscilla	Josef; Rona	No nominations	Evicted by Teen Council (Day 56)					
Anna	Not eligible		Kevin; Valerie	Ejay; Rona	Ejay; Alex	Evicted with Josef (Day 49)						
Ike	Not eligible		Beauty; Ejay	Robi; Josef	Evicted with Jolas (Day 42)							
John	Not eligible		Josef; Alex	Voluntary exit with Kevin (Day 35)								
Ningning	Not eligible		Voluntary exit with Linda (Day 26)									
Boy	Not eligible	Evicted by Teen Council (Day 22)										
Gerry	Not eligible	Evicted with Jieriel (Day 21)										
Violy	Evicted by Teen Council (Day 14)											
Rose	Evicted by Teen Council (Day 14)											
Ely	Evicted by Teen Council (Day 14)											
Challenge Winner	John	Erning	Ike	Carina	My Love	none	Guardians Exited House					
Notes	NONE											
Up for eviction	Jieriel; Josef; Linda; Priscilla; Valerie	Kevin; Linda	Josef; Kevin; Nicole	Jolas; Josef; Robi; Rona	Josef; Nicole; Rona	Beauty; Nicole; Priscilla	Robi; Rona	Nicole; Robi; Valerie	Nan; Robi	Open voting		
Saved from eviction	Josef; 47.49% Priscilla; 19.98% Valerie; 18.66% Linda; 9.28%	Kevin	Josef; Nicole	Robi; 44.82% Josef; 29.43% Rona; 17.09%	Rona; 43.12% Nicole; 30.81%	Nicole 47.74% Beauty 40.75%	Robi; 57.11%	Robi; 41.50% Nicole; 30.68%	Robi; 77.04%	Housemate A 32.41% Housemate B 26.68% Housemate C 23.35% Housemate D 12.49%	Ejay; 36.31%	
Evicted	Jieriel; 4.59%	No; Eviction	No; Eviction	Jolas; 8.66%	Josef; 26.07%	Priscilla; 11.51%	Rona; 42.89%	Valerie; 27.82%	Nan; 22.96%	Alex; 5.07%	Robi; 34.39% Nicole; 18.39% Beauty; 10.91%	
Voluntary Exit	none	Linda	Kevin	none							Robi; 34.39% Nicole; 18.39% Beauty; 10.91%	

Automatic Nomination/s by Big Brother (due to violation(s) committed)
Granted Immunity (challenge winner)
Red numbers indicate votes from Guardians

- 1: Kevin was granted immunity after he and his father won a challenge on Day 13. Priscilla and Valerie were automatically nominated by Big Brother when the two openly had a conversation on Day 12 about who Priscilla would nominate.
- 2: Ejay was granted immunity after he and his father won a challenge on Day 22. On Day 25, however, Linda decided to take the offer of an all-expenses-paid vacation with her family, in effect also taking the voluntary exit. She and her mother left the next day.
- 3: Jolas was granted immunity after he and his father won a challenge on Day 28. Meanwhile, Josef received the most nomination points from the Guardians. Since Josef also amassed the second largest number of nomination points from his peers, the one with the third largest number, Nicole, was included in the list. Three days later, however, Kevin and his father agreed to make a voluntary exit, resulting in the suspension of voting for the second straight week. The two formally exited the House at the end of the week.
- 4: Beauty was granted immunity after she and her mother won a challenge on Day 36. Meanwhile, Rona was included because of a tie between Josef and Jolas. Robi received the most votes from the Guardians and was therefore included in the set of nominees.
- 5: Nan was granted immunity after his mother won a challenge on Day 43. Rona amassed the most votes from the Guardians.
- 6: Big Brother automatically put Beauty, Nicole, and Priscilla up for eviction for mouthing of words, whispering, and asking Shy about events in the outside world. No nominations were held that day, and those automatic nominations were not announced to the housemates until later in the week.
- 7: All nominations were done face-to-face, but while one housemate had to place medals on one's nominees as he/she told Big Brother earlier, everyone else was blindfolded to ensure each housemate could not tell who gave them the nomination points. The entire process was assisted by Mariel and was actually done on Day 57 after the Guardian Big Night because four housemates (see Day 58 above) would be whisked to Palawan for their Island Adventure; the results were aired the next night.
- 8: The housemates were asked to get numbered balls and Nicole, Nan, Valerie and Robi were then tasked to say who they nominated and the reason for nominating them. Everyone's votes still counted however.
- 9: Like the previous nomination night, those who did not have their nominations mentioned before were tasked to say who they nominated and the reason for nominating them. Once again, everyone's votes still counted.
- 10: Open voting was announced after Nan's exit. It is from this final batch that the final four housemates and the eventual winner would be determined. And while another nomination round was again held on Day 70, its results were not actually valid and do not really affect voting.

=== Challenge Win Totals ===
Alex	Beauty	Ejay	Jieriel	Jolas	Josef	Kevin	Linda	Nan	Nicole	Priscilla	Robi	Rona	Valerie
0	1	1	0	1	0	1	0	1	0	0	0	0	0

Housemate that is currently granted with immunity (after being challenge winner)
Housemate with no guardian in the house (before Day 56), and therefore do not participate in the Immunity Games as challengers

=== Guardian Eviction ===
The first two Guardian evictions were held on the second and third weeks, but due to the rapid decrease of the number of Guardians in the House, the show decided that the next Guardian eviction would occur if the last evicted housemate's Guardian is already in the outside world days ahead of that housemate.

The Guardian Big Four will also be independent of the Teen Big Four, i.e. the cash prizes to be won by the Guardian Big Four will not be shared by their wards.

	Guardian Eviction #1	Teen Eviction #2	Guardian Eviction #3	Teen Eviction #4	Teen Eviction #5	Teen Eviction #6	Teen Eviction #7	Guardian Eviction #8	Guardian Big Night		
Eviction Day and Date	Day 14 April 5	Day 21 April 12	Day 22 April 13	Day 26 April 17	Day 35 April 26	Day 42 May 3	Day 49 May 10	Day 56 May 17	Day 57 May 18		
Teen Council	Beauty; Jieriel; Josef; Kevin	None	Alex; Beauty; Ejay; Jolas; Josef; Kevin; Nan; Robi	None	None	None	None	Priscilla; Robi; Rona; Valerie	Open voting through viewer poll		
Notes				Note 11	Note 12			Note 13	Note 14		
Evicted	Ely; Rose; Violy	Gerry	Boy	Ningning	John	Ike	Anna	~~Sandy~~; Carina	Erning; 65.16% Guardian Big Winner		
Evicted	Ely; Rose; Violy	Gerry	Boy	Ningning	John	Ike	Anna	~~Sandy~~; Carina	My Love; 4.64% 4th Guardian; Big Placer	Sandy; 13.98% 3rd Guardian; Big Placer	Minda; 16.22% 2nd Guardian; Big Placer

- ^Note 11: Due to Linda's decision to voluntarily exit the house, her mother Ningning had to leave the House with her.
- ^Note 12: John and his son Kevin agreed to make a voluntary exit together on Day 32. They exited the House three days later.
- ^Note 13: On Day 53, the Final Teen Council composed of the Housemates, without a guardian in the house, decided to evict Sandy, Nicole's mom. However, Beauty decided to do a sacrifice to change the Teen Council's vote and have her mother, Carina be evicted instead.
- ^Note 14: The winners among the Guardians was decided by public vote. The percentage of votes received by each Guardian are in parentheses.

== The Big Night ==
The finale of the season was held at the Araneta Coliseum. It had an outer space/science fiction theme. In fact, one graphic used showed the House turn into a large rocket that shot off its location at the front of the ABS-CBN studios and landed near the venue. Of course, this was not actually the case (see Day 77 in Week 11 section above). In line with the theme, the title character of the show Kokey appeared in the opening number, which also saw the performances of first Celebrity Edition housemate John Prats, second regular edition housemate Mickey Perz, and first Teen Edition housemates Kim Chiu and Gerald Anderson.

The show started with the chronology of events in the House and also featured performances by the superband Project 1, the cast of My Girl (which included Chiu and Anderson), and Billy Crawford, as well as an appearance by Jon Avila. The other housemates were also present, as well as House Players Mikan and Shy. Unlike the finales of the prior two editions (second regular season and second Celebrity Edition), there was no spoof and impersonation segment.

After an estimated total of 1.7 million votes cast since May 31, the start of the open voting, Ejay Falcon was declared the winner with 620,924 votes or 36.31%. Robi Domingo came in second with 588,116 votes or 34.39%. Nicole Uysiuseng was a distant third with 314,582 votes or 18.39% while Beauty Gonzalez was last among the "Big 4" with 186,523 votes or 10.91%

While Ejay became the second male winner of the franchise after second Celebrity Edition victor Ruben Gonzaga, his win was the closest ever with 1.92% (32,808 votes) separating him and Robi. The fact that the top two housemates were boys also ensured the emergence of a male winner. Incidentally, his surrogate father, Erning, was proclaimed as the "Guardian Big Winner" twenty days before (see Guardian Eviction section above).

This table shows the summary of votes as obtained by each of the Teen Big 4 in the Big Night.

Event	Big 4	Votes		Result
Event	Big 4	Actual Votes	Percentage	Result
Big Night	Ejay	620,924	36.31%	Winner
Big Night	Robi	588,116	34.39%	Runner-Up
Big Night	Nicole	314,582	18.39%	3rd Place
Big Night	Beauty	186,523	10.91%	4th Place
TOTAL VOTES		1,710,145 votes	100%	—N/a

== The Big Reunion ==
While the season technically ended with the finale on Day 77, the housemates actually returned to the House even after the announcement of winners. They were visited by Nicole's father, Robi's younger brother, Beauty's father, and Ejay's half-siblings.

On the day after Day 77 (June 8, 2008), a "Big Reunion" was held, in which the final four were joined by the hosts and were reunited with the other housemates, House Players Mikan and Shy and the Guardians. All moments that happened during the season were also revisited, such as funny moments, tense and sad moments, and kilig (love-inspiring) moments.

Preceded by Celebrity Edition 2	Pinoy Big Brother Teen Edition Plus (March 23 – June 7, 2008)	Succeeded by Double Up
