= Fred Payawan =

Filipino actor

- Born: Fred Payawan; March 12, 1989 (age 37); Parañaque, Philippines
- Occupation: Actor
- Years active: 2006–2013
- Agent: Star Magic (2006–2013)

Fred Payawan (born March 12, 1989) is a Filipino actor. He is a co-housemate with PBB Teen Edition. He is one of Gerald Anderson's bestfriends, from whom he met in PBB Teen Edition. He is part of ABS-CBN Star Magic talents.

== Filmography ==
=== Film ===
| Year | Title | Role |
|---|---|---|
| 2008 | My Big Love | Rene |
| 2010 | Cinco | Frat Member |
| 2011 | Catch Me, I'm In Love | Psg |
| 2011 | No Other Woman | Guest Actor |

=== Television ===
| Year | Title | Role |
|---|---|---|
| 2006 | Pinoy Big Brother: Teen Edition 1 | Himself |
| 2006 | Your Song: Bitin Sa iyo | Duval |
| 2006 | Astigs in Haay...School Life | Rico |
| 2007 | Your Song: Just A Smile Away | Jack's Friend |
| 2008 | My Girl | Brando |
| 2008 | Lipgloss | Jigo Perez |
| 2009 | Maalaala Mo Kaya: Lubid | Tobi |
| 2010 | Kung Tayo'y Magkakalayo | Borge |
| 2010 | Your Song: Gimik 2010 | Robbie |
| 2010 | Imortal | Boy Tabla |
| 2011 | Sabel | Brian |
| 2011 | Wansapanataym: Ang Bagong Car Ni Carl | Matt |
| 2011 | Maria la del Barrio | Kevin |
| 2011 | Maalaala Mo Kaya: Tinapay | Guest Actor |
| 2012 | Walang Hanggan | Lucas Villareal |
| 2012 | Maalaala Mo Kaya: School Uniform | Eduardo |
| 2012 | Wansapanataym: Amanda's Da Man | Rob |
| 2013 | Apoy sa Dagat | Clyde |
