= Mikee Lee =

Filipino actor (born 1990)

- Born: Michael Vincent Cabral Lee; January 19, 1990 (age 36); Manila, Philippines
- Education: Ateneo de Manila University
- Occupations: Actor; model; host
- Years active: 2006–2010
- Agents: Star Magic (2006–2010); Stages (2008–2010)

Michael Vincent Lee (born January 19, 1990) is a Filipino actor, model, host from Manila, Philippines. He was a runner up in the reality television series, Pinoy Big Brother: Teen Edition 1 behind the big winner Kim Chiu.

== Biography ==
Michael Vincent Lee was born on January 19, 1990, in Manila, Philippines. He graduated with a degree in Management Engineering from the Ateneo de Manila University.

== Pinoy Big Brother: Teen Edition ==
Mikee gained recognition when he joined the first teen edition of popular Philippine reality show, Pinoy Big Brother. He was given the moniker "Pambato ng Ateneo" (Ateneo's best bet). Inside the Big Brother house, he was linked with fellow housemate Kim Chiu. Most people assumed that they would end up together because both admitted mutual admiration for each other. However, upon going out of the house, Kim has since then been partnered with Filipino-American housemate Gerald Anderson.

Mikee came in second at the series finale of the reality show behind runaway winner, Kim Chiu.

== Life after Pinoy Big Brother ==
Mikee, along with his fellow housemates, joined the show business as part of Star Magic Talents. He has since starred in several teen-oriented shows in his home network, ABS-CBN. He is also part of Y Speak, a talk show of ABS-CBN's sister company, Studio 23. Mikee is also model for Bench, a local clothing brand. Recently, Mikee stars in the TV5's teen drama, Lipgloss. Unlike his previous characters, his role as Maui in the TV show is different, portraying a haughty teenager.

Mikee is also very active and passionate in the world's largest student organization, AIESEC. In 2010, he was vice president for Finance of the Local Committee of AIESEC in Ateneo de Manila University.

== Filmography ==
=== Film ===
Year	Title	Role	Notes	Source
2009	The Forgotten War	Private Icasiano		
2009	Bente	Randy		

=== Television ===
Year	Title	Role	Notes	Source
2006	Pinoy Big Brother: Teen Edition	Himself	1st Runner Up	
2006	Your Song Presents: Bitin Sa Iyo	Raymond		
2006–08	Y Speak	Himself	Host	
2006–07	Star Magic Presents: Abt Ur Luv	Mao Pagkalinawan		
2007	Star Magic Presents: Abt Ur Luv:Ur Lyf 2	Mao Pagkalinawan		
2008	Shall We Dance?	Himself	Celebrity guest performer	
2008–09	Lipgloss	Maui Amor / Bentong		
2008–09	Take 5	Host		
2008–09	Soul Mix	Himself	Video jock	
