= Nicole Uysiuseng =

Filipino actress (born 1990)

- Born: Nicole Kim Uysiuseng; August 18, 1990 (age 35); Cebu City, Cebu, Philippines
- Education: PAREF Southcrest School
- Alma mater: Ateneo de Manila University (BA)
- Years active: 2008–2012
- Agent: Star Magic (2008–2012)
- Known for: My Girl
- Height: 5 ft 6 in (168 cm)
- Spouse: Silas del Prado (m. 2019)
- Children: 1

Nicole Kim Uysiuseng-del Prado (born August 18, 1990), is a former Filipino actress, model, and was the second runner-up of the reality television show Pinoy Big Brother: Teen Edition Plus. She was also a member of ABS-CBN's Star Magic.

Taking a break from her career to finish her education, she got in to Ateneo de Manila University and graduated with a course in B.A. Interdisciplinary Studies.

She has now quit the showbiz scene and is married to Silas del Prado; the father of her child, Nadia del Prado.

== Career ==
After her stint in PBB, Nicole joined the cast of the Philippine remake of My Girl with Robi Domingo and Josef Elizalde. After My Girl, she was given a regular show on ABS-CBN via Precious Hearts Romances present: Bud Brothers and Somewhere In My Heart.

== Filmography ==
=== Television ===
Year	Title	Role
2011	Maalaala Mo Kaya	Fina
2010	Maalaala Mo Kaya: "Dancing Shoes"	Marta
2009	Precious Hearts Romances: Somewhere In My Heart	Myra
2009	Precious Hearts Romances: Bud Brothers	Sakura
2009	Komiks Presents: Nasaan Ka Maruja?	Levi
2009	May Bukas Pa	Katrina
2009	Midnight DJ: Santacruzan del Muerte	Sagala 1
2009	ASAP' 09	Full Circle
2009	Lipgloss	Sheila
2009	Kapitan Boom	Jenna
2008	Kahit Isang Saglit	Miranda
2008	Midnight DJ "JS Promenade	Amy
2008	Your Song: "Kapag Ako ang Nagmahal"	Miranda Rivera
2008	Maalaala Mo Kaya: "Board Game"	Kyra
2008	Sineserye Presents: Patayin Sa Sindak Si Barbara	Lineth
2008	Maynila presents: My Girl, My Muse	Julie
2008	Mag TV Na!	Guest
2008	ASAP' 08	Guest
2008	My Girl	Hannah Abueva / Miranda Castro
2008	Pinoy Big Brother: Teen Edition Plus	Herself / Housemate / 3rd Big Placer

=== Movies ===
Year	Title	Role
2010	Super Inday and the Golden Bibe	Ms. Rhian
2010	Till My Heartaches End	Jenna
2010	Babe, I Love You	Chloe
2009	Mano Po 6: A Mother's Love	Audrey Uy
2008	Iskul Bukol 20 Years After: The Ungasis and Escaleras Adventure	Tessa

== Awards and nominations ==
Awards and Nomination
Year	Award giving body	Category	Nominated work	Results
2008	22nd PMPC Star Awards for TV	Best New Female TV Personality	My Girl	Nominated
