= Lipgloss (TV series) =

- Genre: Teen drama
- Created by: MPB Primedia, Inc.
- Developed by: Prime Events Force Unlimited
- Written by: Geraldine Gentozala-Juachon; Crisaldo Lim; Miel Villaruel
- Directed by: Chris Pablo; Aleah Aliporo Eugenio
- Starring: Rodjun Cruz; Mikee Lee; Fred Payawan; Kevin Lapena; Charina Suzara; Maxene Eigenmann; Louise delos Reyes
- Opening theme: "So Fab" by Carla dela Rosa
- Ending theme: "So Fab" by Carla dela Rosa
- Country of origin: Philippines
- Original languages: Filipino; English
- No. of seasons: 4
- No. of episodes: 54

Production
- Running time: 1 hour

Original release
- Network: TV5
- Release: August 16, 2008 – August 29, 2009

Related
- Gossip Girl

Lipgloss is a Philippine television drama series broadcast by TV5. The series is based on the American TV series Gossip Girl. Directed by Chris Pablo and Aleah Aliporo Eugenio, it stars Rodjun Cruz, Mikee Lee, Fred Payawan, Kevin Lapena, Charina Suzara, Maxene Eigenmann and Louise delos Reyes. It aired for first season from August 16 to November 8, 2008, replacing PBA on ABC. The show aired for season 2 from November 15, 2008, to February 7, 2009, season 3 from February 14 to May 9, 2009, and season 4 from May 16 to August 29, 2009.

The show's theme song was very similar to – and was directly inspired by – the song "Lip Gloss" by Lil Mama.

== Story ==
Lipgloss was a teenage drama series, following the lives of the rich and infamous students of the ultra-exclusive Linden High, through the school's unofficial website.

== Plot ==
=== Season 1 ===
Season 1 kicks off with best friends Abby and Meg competing for Jake, who falls in love with Meg and ends his relationship with Abby, whom he was dating.

The whole cast is introduced. Julivee is new in Linden and becomes best friends with Louise, who is a popular ice skater. They meet siblings Ziggy and Edge Borja. Steph is introduced as the meanest girl in school. Maui is Jake's friend. Jiggo is Jake's half-brother. We learn that Kyle, who is never to be seen again in the series, is the administrator of the site Lipgloss.

=== Season 2 ===
Season Two is filled with love-related conflicts. Jake and Abby are together again, but their parents don't approve so they decide to live on their own. Meg and Edge break up because Sarah, Edge's ex-girlfriend returns to woo him back. Meg finds a new boyfriend in actor Nikko Lopez. Julivee develops a crush on Caloy, their driver's son. Caloy's best friend, Poknat, joins in on the fun and provides comic relief. Jose Mari is introduced as Julivee's would-be husband. However, Jose Mari turns out to be gay and gets closer with Caloy instead. Louise gets into a relationship with her middle-aged school professor, Mr. Aldrich Quinto.

=== Season 3 ===
Abby and Jake break up because of Jake's boss Camille who steals him from her. Meg to the hands of his bodyguard Santi, who develops feelings for her. Maui falls for Carla who is also courted by Poknat. Louise and Aldrich break up because Aldrich returns to his ex-fiancée Rose. Introducing in the mid-season is Camille and Rose's brother Brent who wants Louise. Meanwhile, it is Edge and Louise who end up together. Julivee meets Brazilian Patrice whom they use to make Jose Mari a boy again.

A devastating accident kills two main characters — Maui and Meg.

=== Season 4 ===
The fourth and final season shows the senior year of the students at Linden, including repeater Abby Rickson, who has finally moved on from Jake and Camille. Brent starts courting Louise, but finds competition in his long-time best friend, Chip, to whom he owes a big debt. Julivee gets jealous over Janna, a girl who Caloy meets. Carla tries to move on from Maui. Edge meets a beautiful princess, Ava, whom he falls for.

The finale shows the love teams ending up with each other: Abby and Jake, Louise and Brent, Ava and Edge.

== Cast ==
=== Original cast ===
- Maxene Eigenmann as Abby Rickson
- Saab Magalona as Meg Magdrigal
- Rodjun Cruz as Jake Perez
- Mikee Lee as Maui Amor / Bentong
- Fred Payawan as Jiggo Perez
- Sam Concepcion as Kyle Ponce
- Kevin Jose Lapena as Edge Borja
- Cheska Ortega as Ziggy Borja
- Louise delos Reyes as Louise Tangco
- Czarina Suzara as Julivee
- Miki Hahn as Stephanie "Steph" Garces
- Princess Ryan as Sarah Madison

=== Season 2 additions ===
- Neil Coleta as Caloy Borongan
- Jessa Joy Mendoza as Carla Borongan
- Carl Guevarra as Jose Mari Bonifacio
- Zyrus Dezamparado as Poknat

=== Season 3 additions ===
- Niña Jose as Camille Borromeo
- Nico Ibaviosa as Brent Borromeo
- Ejay Falcon as Santi

=== Season 4 additions ===
- Lovi Poe as Princess Ava
- Regine Angeles as Charlene Rickson
- Cherry Ann Kubota as Allona Rickson
- Enz Guazon as Chip Ledesma
- Benj Besa as Knoxx
- Rhen Escaño as Jana

=== Extended cast ===
- Christian Vasquez as Aldrich Quintos
- Rachel Lobangco as Abby's mom
- Ricardo Cepeda as Congressman Perez
- Debraliz as Julie (Julivee's mom)
- Lloyd Samartino as Meg's dad
- Daiana Menezes as Patrice
- Miguel de las Cagigas as Prince Drew
- Lorenzo Mara as Edge's dad
- Lian Paz as Rose Borromeo
- Emilio Garcia
- Macy Garcia
- Richard Quan as Louise's dad

=== Guests ===
- Paolo Paraiso as Alex
- Joross Gamboa as Thirdy
- Enrique Gil as Kyle's Friend
- Matt Evans as Nikko Lopez
- Megan Young as Jenny Samson
- Janina San Miguel as Buding
- Angelica Jones as Mimi
- Marco Alcaraz as Frank
- Matutina as Lola Biring
- Jana Roxas as Kelly
- Rosanna Roces as Princess Arabelle/Mommy A.
- Wanlu as Talentadong Pinoy judge
- Beatriz Saw as Mayumi Castro
- Sugar Mercado as Rosanna
- Marco Morales as Kikoy
- Josef Elizalde as Prince Ali
- Nicole Uysiuseng as Sheila
- JB Magsaysay as Joel
- Olyn Membian as Liza
- Katarina Perez as Sheena

== Awards ==
- Winner, Best Youth Oriented Program — 2010 PMPC Star Awards for TV
- Nominated, Best Youth Oriented Program — 2008–2009 PMPC Star Awards for TV

== See also ==
- List of TV5 (Philippine TV network) original programming
