= Josef Elizalde =

Filipino actor (born 1991)

- Born: Marc Josef Elizalde; May 28, 1990 (age 36); Mandaluyong, Metro Manila, Philippines
- Occupation: Actor
- Years active: 2008–present
- Agents: Star Magic (2008–2017); Viva Artists Agency (2017–present)
- Height: 174 cm (5 ft 9 in)

Marc Josef Elizalde (born May 28, 1990) is a Filipino actor who was a housemate on Pinoy Big Brother: Teen Edition Plus with Robi Domingo, his rival at that time.

== Career ==
He gained prominence when he joined Pinoy Big Brother in 2008. Fellow housemates from this batch included Robi Domingo and Beauty Gonzales. After getting eliminated, he was cast in multiple television shows until making a breakthrough role as a gay character in Angelito: Batang Ama. He was previously cast in the longtime running crime/drama series FPJ's Ang Probinsyano.

== Personal life ==
Marc Josef Elizalde was born to Butch Elizalde and Marinez Carvajal. Butch is a member of rock band "Route 70" while Marinez is the talent manager of fellow actor Jericho Rosales. His family is from the prominent Elizalde clan of Pampanga. He was formerly linked to fellow PBB housemate Nicole Uysiuseng.

== Filmography ==
=== Film ===
Year	Title	Role
2011	Catch Me, I'm in Love	Erick's friend
2016	Just the 3 of Us	Jerome
2018	Never Not Love You	Joanne's co-worker
2018	Squad Goals	Connor
2018	Sid & Aya: Not a Love Story	Gabe
2019	Ulan	Topi
2019	Last Fool Show	Fonzy
2021	Kaka	Rick
2022	Doblado	
2022	Purificacion	
2022	Alapaap	

=== Television ===
Year	Title	Role
2008	My Girl	Samboy
2008	Lipgloss	Prince Ali
2009	Tayong Dalawa	Charles
2009	Bud Brothers Series	Naruto
2009	Agimat: Ang Mga Alamat ni Ramon Revilla: Pepeng Agimat	
2010	Momay	
2010	Magkaribal	Tommy
2011	Kristine	Nathaniel's friend
2011	Mana Po	Mompo
2011–2012	Angelito: Batang Ama	Charlotte
2013	Maalaala Mo Kaya: Diploma	David
2013	Maalaala Mo Kaya: Wedding Booth	Rudy
2014	Maalaala Mo Kaya: Abito	
2018	Since I Found You	Jeff
2018	Precious Hearts Romances Presents: Araw Gabi	Sid Romero
2018	Maalaala Mo Kaya: Portrait	Dennis
2019	Ipaglaban Mo!: Dignidad	Makot
2019	FPJ's Ang Probinsyano	PLt. Louie Rallos
2020	Bella Bandida	Brick Ortaleza
2021	Encounter: Philippine Adaptation	JC
2023	Minsan pa Nating Hagkan ang Nakaraan	Matt Herrera
