= Pinoy Big Brother: Teen Edition 1 =

Pinoy Big Brother: Teen Edition
- Season 1
- Presented by: Mariel Rodriguez; Bianca Gonzalez
- No. of days: 42
- No. of housemates: 14
- Winner: Kim Chiu
- Runner-up: Mikee Lee

Release
- Original network: ABS-CBN
- Original release: April 23 – June 3, 2006

Season chronology
- Next → Teen Edition Plus

The first season of the reality game show Pinoy Big Brother: Teen Edition (retroactively known as Teen Edition 1 to differentiate it from Teen Edition Plus, Teen Clash 2010, and the fourth edition) premiered on the ABS-CBN network on April 23, 2006 and ran for 42 days until June 3, 2006.

This edition features civilians aged thirteen to nineteen; (Note: However, the age limit for the teen edition of Pinoy Big Brother: 737 was lowered down to 12, when Bailey May entered the house at the age of 12. He currently holds the record for being the youngest housemate to enter a Big Brother house in the world to date.) the next editions, including those from merged editions, would also follow suit. Unlike its British counterpart, this edition closely resembled its regular counterpart, with additional rules imposed for the teen housemates.

The season featured a fast-paced gameplay, with double evictions happening every week, until four teen housemates remained for the final.

Kim Chiu was named the series' first "Teen Big Winner" after 42 days of competition against runner-up Mikee Lee and finalists Gerald Anderson, and Clare Cabiguin who placed third and fourth, respectively.

== Development ==
=== Auditions ===
During the last few days of the first celebrity season, auditions in Cebu City, Davao City, and Metro Manila were announced, and 30,000 teenagers answered the audition call. Of these, twelve housemates were selected: eight represented the Luzon area, while four came from Visayas and Mindanao.

== Overview ==
=== The house ===
For this edition, the house was redecorated with a pop art theme. The colours of the walls were changed, and even the living area had a mural with pop art depictions of Mao Zedong, Bruce Lee, and Marilyn Monroe, to name a few. The housemates were also provided with a foosball table and some trampolines.

=== Hosts ===
Mariel Rodriguez took over as main host of the primetime edition, while former Celebrity Edition contestant Bianca Gonzalez hosted the UpLate edition of the show. Toni Gonzaga, on the other hand, reprised her role as host during the finale.

=== Theme song ===
The theme song for this edition was Kabataang Pinoy (Filipino Youth) by Itchyworms. The new theme song was first performed by the band during the first Celebrity Edition's finale on April 1, 2006.

=== Prizes ===
The prizes for the Big Winner included a condominium unit in Valenzuela City, a livelihood showcase, one million pesos, and an all-expense-paid trip to any Philippine destination.

== Housemates ==
The twelve initial housemates were introduced in the grand welcome party on Day 1, April 23, 2006, near the facade of the Pinoy Big Brother house. They were transported through motorbikes before they were introduced onstage and were sent to enter the house. The ages of the housemates were their ages as of the time of their entry to the Big Brother house. Origin indicates where the housemates were born or based before joining the program.

As a result of Aldred Gatchalian's voluntary exit on Day 7 and Bam Romana's forced eviction on Day 14, two replacement housemates were introduced in the house. On Day 9 (May 1, 2006), Joaqui Mendoza entered the Big Brother house as Aldred's replacement, while on Day 15 (May 7, 2006), Brenda Fox entered as Bam's replacement.

Name	Age on entry	Hometown	Entered	Exited	Result
Kim Chiu	16	Cebu City	Day 1	Day 42	Winner
Mikee Lee	16	Quezon City	Day 1	Day 42	Runner-up
Gerald Anderson	17	General Santos	Day 1	Day 42	3rd Place
Clare Cabiguin	18	Malaybalay City	Day 1	Day 42	4th Place
Jamilla Obispo	17	Laguna	Day 1	Day 35	Evicted
Brenda Fox	16	Olongapo City	Day 15	Day 35	Evicted
Matt Evans	19	Quezon City	Day 1	Day 28	Evicted
Olyn Meimban	16	Quezon City	Day 1	Day 28	Evicted
Fred Payawan	17	Parañaque	Day 1	Day 21	Evicted
Joaqui Mendoza	17	Parañaque	Day 9	Day 21	Evicted
Niña Jose	18	Makati	Day 1	Day 14	Evicted
Bam Romana	16	Parañaque	Day 1	Day 14	Forced eviction
Mikki Arceo	18	Davao City	Day 1	Day 11	Evicted
Aldred Gatchalian	15	Pasay	Day 1	Day 11	Voluntary exit

== Chronology ==
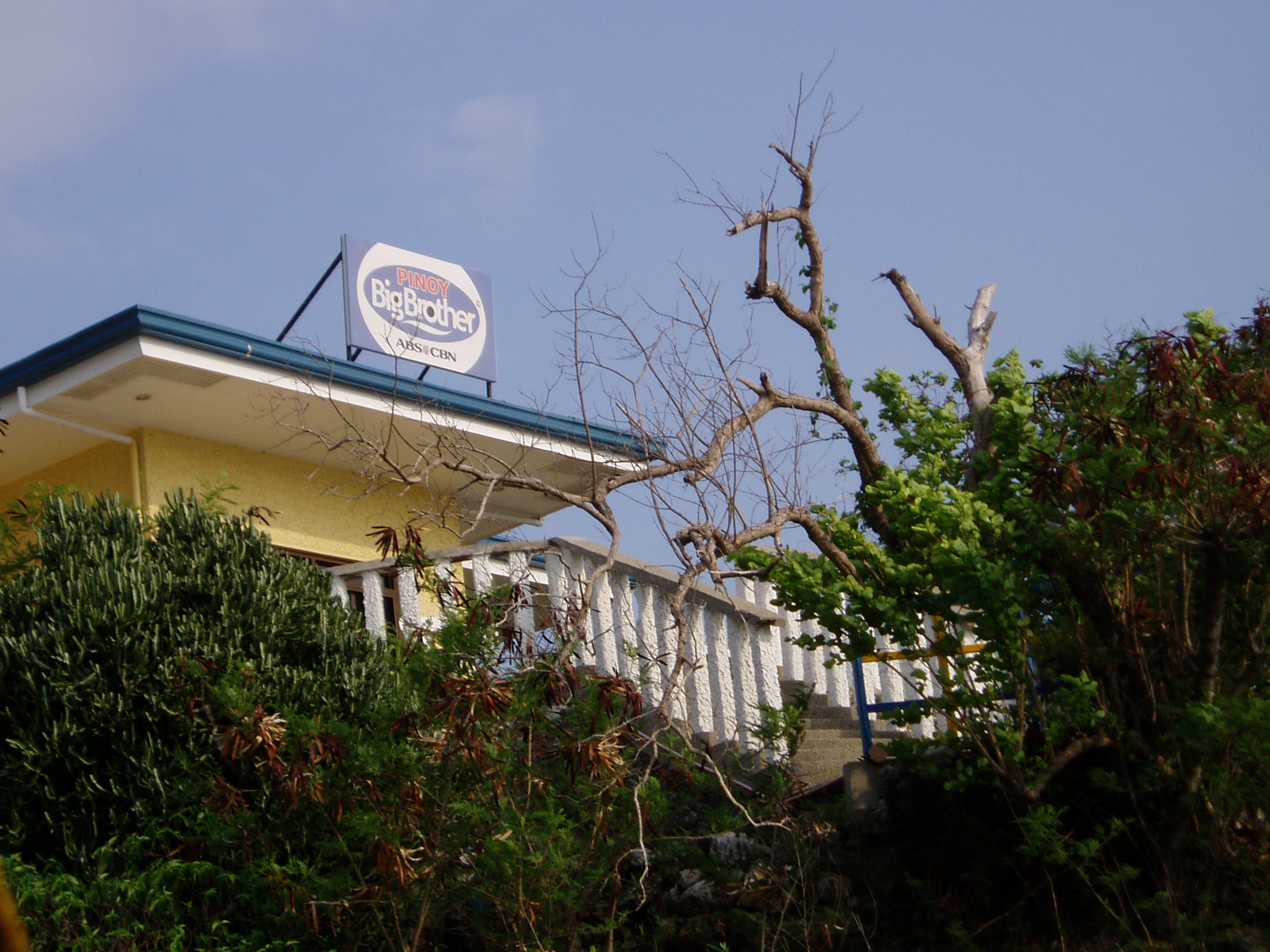
The Pinoy Big Brother House at Alaminos, Pangasinan.

For the first week, traffic lights and road signs were installed in the house to teach the housemates about the traffic rules in place in their country.

- April 23: The 12 housemates entered the house by pairs.
- April 26: As Big Brother's request, Kim sang her rendition of Emil Chou's song Peng You (朋友). Unknown to her, her singing was overheard by everybody in the house. Peng You would not only become Kim's "signature song," but would also have a Filipino version to be sung not just by her, but also with her favorite band MYMP.
- April 30: First nomination night - Mikki, Olyn, and Niña were nominated.
- May 1: Joaqui entered the house as Aldred's replacement.
- May 4: Big Brother announced that aside from either Niña or Olyn, the two remaining nominees for eviction, one from among the other housemates will be evicted forcedly from the house that coming Saturday.
- May 7: Second nomination night - Joaqui, Fred, Jamilla, and Clare were nominated. Brenda entered the house as Bam's replacement.
- May 14: Third nomination night - Matt, Mikee, and Olyn were nominated.
- May 15–20: The housemates did various sacrifices so Jamilla's son Miggy would complete the five operations needed to correct his cleft palate:
  - The girls would have all of their locks of hair braided on each other, literally forming an adhesive group.
  - The boys would act and walk like ducks; they were provided with flippers to simulate webbed feet.
  - An activity called Operation Smile where the housemates should keep smiling for two days. When the housemates failed on that particular sacrifice and Brenda offered to voluntarily leave the house, Big Brother directed the housemates to do a modified version of Operation Smile by having one housemate continually smile while having his/her mouth (and its surrounding area) painted red until he/she gets tired, at which point another housemate should take over.

Big Brother offered these sacrifices after he informed Jamilla that a group of surgeons agreed to give Miggy the four more operations at no charge. Prior to Jamilla's entry into the house, Miggy already had one operation done.

- May 19: To celebrate his birthday, Frankie, a tall man dressed as Frankenstein's monster, set up a dating game in which Olyn won. Olyn thought she won a date with former Celebrity Housemate Zanjoe Marudo when in fact, Zanjoe only acted as Frankie's mouthpiece. To complete the effect, Olyn was made over into the monster's bride, much to her horror. Most of the housemates were shocked at the sight of Frankie, but later overcame that fear when they found out that the tall man is just harmless. Olyn, being afraid of a lot of things, was the last one to realize the monster's friendliness. Frankie first appeared in the first season to scare the wits out of the housemates, especially Uma and, to some lesser extent, Sam, and celebrate Halloween with them. His second ever appearance was meant as a practical joke for Olyn to reveal another one of her fears and help her overcome it.
- May 20: After Matt and Olyn's exit, it was announced that instead of another nomination night, the next round of voting would be to select the final four housemates. The two housemates with the lowest number of votes would be evicted, while the remaining four would contend for the big prize.
- May 21: The two remaining male housemates, Gerald and Mikee engaged in a "Teen Debate," hosted by Season 1 Housemate Jason Gainza. The arguments topics were spontaneous, albeit humorous. The winner in each argument was splashed with goo by the female housemates. Gerald defeated Mikee, 3–2; he won a "carnival" date with Kim with some "dirty ice cream" and cotton candy. Big Brother later announced the voting mechanics already mentioned above.
- May 24: The housemates temporarily exited the house to shop at SM Mall of Asia for toys as gifts for young cancer patients. Upon their return to the house, they busied themselves with wrapping the toys. Of course, the housemates had limited contact during their brief time outside.
- May 29: For the final week of the Teen Edition, Kim and Gerald were whisked away to an isolated house in the Hundred Islands National Park, Alaminos, Pangasinan, while Mikee and Clare were cluelessly left behind, not knowing where their two friends were. This "island adventure" was announced to viewers the previous Saturday. Going to the Hundred Islands National Park is part of the final task for the final four housemates and they will use their scuba diving skills there.
- May 30: Early in the morning, Mikee and Clare were brought to the Hundred Islands. The two assumed that they would do a "secret elf" task. Mikee and Clare met up with Gerald and Kim later in the day.
- May 31: Gerald was sent back early to the Big Brother House in Manila as disciplinary action for cheating at a task back at the Hundred Islands. While collecting garbage in that particular task, he placed a rock among the garbage he collected and effectively made the garbage bag heavier. He spent the rest of the day picking up rocks, talking to himself, and apologizing to everybody.
- June 1: After three days in the Hundred Islands, Mikee, Kim, and Clare returned to the Big Brother house in Manila.

== Nomination History ==
The housemate first mentioned in each nomination gets two points, while the second gets one point. As two housemates will go out every week, three nominees are put up for eviction every week. For the first nomination, one housemate was evicted for two consecutive evictions on Day 11 and 14. For the next three eviction nights, on Day 21, Day 28 and Day 35, two housemates were evicted per night.

Pinoy Big Brother: Teen Edition 1 nomination history
	#1	#2	#3	#4	#5	Big Night	Nominations Received
Eviction Day and Date	Day 11 May 3	Day 14 May 6	Day 21 May 13	Day 28 May 20	Day 35 May 27	Day 42 June 3	Nominations Received
Nomination Day and Date	Day 7 April 29		Day 15; May 7	Day 22; May 14	Day 29; May 21		Nominations Received
Kim	Niña; Gerald		Jamilla; Joaqui	Olyn; Matt	No nominations	Winner	2
Mikee	Mikki; Niña		Joaqui; Jamilla	Olyn; Matt	No nominations	Runner-Up	5
Gerald	Olyn; Mikki		Joaqui; Clare	Matt; Olyn	No nominations	3rd Place	7
Clare	Bam; Niña		Joaqui; Gerald	Olyn; Mikee	No nominations	4th Place	6
Jamilla	Niña; Fred		Joaqui; Fred	Olyn; Brenda	No nominations	Evicted (Day 35)	3
Brenda	Not in the House		Exempt	Matt; Gerald	No nominations	Evicted (Day 35)	1
Matt	Mikki; Gerald		Joaqui; Gerald	Gerald; Olyn	Evicted (Day 28)		7
Olyn	Mikki; Mikee		Fred; Joaqui	Mikee; Kim	Evicted (Day 28)		16
Fred	Mikki; Matt		Joaqui; Olyn	Evicted (Day 21)			4
Joaqui	Not in the House	Exempt	Clare; Kim	Evicted (Day 21)			14
Niña	Clare; Olyn		Evicted (Day 14)				6
Bam	Mikki; Aldred		Forced Eviction (Day 14)				3
Mikki	Olyn; Clare	Evicted (Day 11)					11
Aldred	Olyn; Bam	Voluntarily Exited (Day 11)					1
Notes	See note 1	See note 2	See note 3	See note 4		—N/a	
Up for eviction	Mikki; Niña; Olyn	Niña; Olyn	Clare; Fred; Joaqui; Jamilla	Matt; Mikee; Olyn	Open Voting		
Saved from eviction	Housemate A 42.30% Housemate B 31.30%	Olyn; 57.30%	Jamilla; 39.90% Clare; 28.00%	Mikee; 49.20%	Kim; 30.40% Mikee; 17.50% Gerald; 17.00% Clare; 14.00%	Kim; 41.40%	
Evicted	Mikki; 26.40%	Niña; 42.70%	Fred; 19.50% Joaqui; 12.60%	Matt; 32.00% Olyn; 18.80%	Jamilla; 12.70% Brenda; 8.40%	Mikee; 20.70% Gerald; 19.40% Clare; 18.50%	
Forced Eviction	none	Bam	none			Mikee; 20.70% Gerald; 19.40% Clare; 18.50%	
Voluntary Exit	Aldred	none				Mikee; 20.70% Gerald; 19.40% Clare; 18.50%	

^Note 1: On Day 7, Aldred voluntarily left the house before the first nominations due to homesickness. He was replaced by Joaqui.
^Note 2: As Aldred's replacement, Joaqui entered the house. He was not able to take part in the nominations for the week and hence, is exempt from eviction. On Day 14, Bam was forcibly evicted due to his violations. See Elimination notes section.
^Note 3: On Day 15, Brenda entered the house as Bam's replacement; for being a new entrant she was exempt from that week's nominations.
^Note 4: Open voting was announced after Matt and Olyn's exit from the house.

== Elimination notes ==
- Aldred - Since the show started, he had a difficult time adjusting to his new environment and new housemates and he never resolved his problems. So he made up his mind on Day 6 to take a voluntary exit the next day. News of this reached his fellow housemates, who were saddened by it because of his good impression to them. The day of his exit was supposed to be the day of the first nomination night, but his exit moved the schedule of the nomination process to the next day. Two days later, new housemate Joaqui took his place. It was widely speculated before he left that Aldred was the housemate rumored to be underaged, hence his voluntary exit. However, in his first interview a week after his exit, the main reason is homesickness and the pressure to fit in.
- Mikki - With 26.4% of the vote among the three nominated housemates, she was the first housemate officially evicted from the house on Day 11. The other two unnamed housemates had 42.3% and 31.3% of the remaining votes.
- Bam - Among the four housemates mentioned by Big Brother, he committed the gravest violations, and therefore was forcibly evicted by Big Brother on Day 14. This was done as disciplinary action for violations such as talking without the lapel microphone, writing using pen and paper, using hand signals, whispering, talking when told not to, etc. The next day, new housemate Brenda entered the house to take Bam's place.
- Niña - With 42.7% of the votes, she became the second housemate officially evicted from the house on Day 14 following Bam. Olyn, the other nominee that week, earned 57.3%.
- Joaqui and Fred - On Day 21, both Joaqui and Fred were evicted from the house as they were the two lowest vote-getters among the four nominees. They each obtained only 12.6% and 19.5% of the total number of votes, respectively. The two other nominees, Clare and Jamilla, got 28% and 39.9% of the votes, respectively. It was announced after Niña's exit that two housemates would be evicted on the same night every week until four are left in the house.
- Olyn and Matt - On Day 28, both Olyn and Matt were evicted from the house as Mikee obtained the most votes among the three nominees. Olyn and Matt obtained 18.8% and 32% of the vote respectively while Mikee got 49.2%.
- Brenda and Jamilla - On Day 35, both Brenda and Jamilla were the final evictees, having received 8.4 and 12.7% votes, respectively. The remaining housemates each received of 14%, 17%, 17.5%, and 30.4% of the vote, with the identities of the housemates who earned each percentage withheld. That is because the same votes will be used to determine the winner of the edition.

== The Big Night ==
On June 3, 2006, at the Aliw Theater in Pasay, Kim Chiu was crowned the winner of the first Teen Edition, garnering 41.4% or 626,562 votes of the final votes cast since Day 29. Mikee Lee came in second with 20.7% or 313,032 votes, while Gerald Anderson in third with 19.4% or 293,234 votes. Clare Cabiguin was the first to come out among the final four, garnering 18.5% or 279,390 votes. A record 1,512,218 votes were cast in the Big Night.

The Teen Big Four entered in a boat and was escorted to a waiting room. Soon the winners were declared one after the other. The Big Night was entitled A Fairy Tale Finale, therefore all the sets and costumes were fairy tale related. The final four were also addressed as princes and princesses. The Fourth and Third Big Placers received a cash prize of ₱100,000, a college scholarship and a trip to a local destination. The Second Teen Big Placer received a cash prize of ₱500,000, a college scholarship and a trip to a local destination. The Teen Big Winner received a cash prize of ₱1,000,000, a college scholarship, a trip to a local destination and a condominium unit to Chatteau Valenzuela.

The finale also marked Toni Gonzaga's return to the show as host.

== See also ==
- Pinoy Dream Academy
- Star Circle Quest
- StarStruck

== Notes ==
Preceded by Celebrity Edition 1	Pinoy Big Brother Teen Edition (April 23 – June 3, 2006)	Succeeded by Season 2
