= My Girl (2008 TV series) =

2008 Philippine television drama series

- Title card
- Genre: Romantic comedy
- Created by: ABS-CBN Studios
- Based on: My Girl by Hong sisters
- Developed by: ABS-CBN Studios
- Written by: Philip King
- Directed by: Erick C. Salud; Jerome C. Pobocan
- Starring: Kim Chiu; Gerald Anderson; Enchong Dee
- Theme music composer: Smokey Robinson and Ronald White
- Opening theme: "My Girl" by Sam Milby
- Country of origin: Philippines
- Original languages: Filipino; Cebuano; Ilocano; Chinese
- No. of episodes: 75

Production
- Executive producers: Roldeo T. Endrinal; Brenda Lee Estocapio
- Production locations: Manila, Philippines
- Running time: 26-31 minutes
- Production company: Dreamscape Entertainment Television

Original release
- Network: ABS-CBN
- Release: May 26 – September 5, 2008

My Girl is a 2008 Philippine television drama series broadcast by ABS-CBN. The series is based on the 2005 South Korean drama series of the same title. Directed by Erick C. Salud and Jerome C. Pobocan, it stars Kim Chiu, Gerald Anderson and Enchong Dee. It aired on the network's Primetime Bida line up and worldwide on TFC from May 26 to September 5, 2008, replacing Maligno and was replaced by I Love Betty La Fea.

The series is streaming online on YouTube.

== Synopsis ==
The story starts with Jasmine (Kim Chiu), a girl working with her two friends, Christine (Alex Gonzaga) and Jeffrey (David Chua), as guides for Chinese tourists, to earn money for her and her father Chito (Lito Pimentel) who always gambles. One day he scores big time at a horse race; however he and Jasmine got robbed and Chito can no longer pay a gangster for his borrowed money. He overhears one day that he is a useless father and he leaves.

Jasmine and Julian (Gerald Anderson) first meet on an airplane. Jasmine is at the airport waiting for Christine and Jeffrey to arrive with their tour group. As a way of stalling, Jasmine acts as though her true love is on the plane and says that she wants to tell him how she feels before he leaves. Meanwhile, Julian is on his way to Cebu in search of his long-lost cousin, Hannah. Jasmine bumps into an old lady and accidentally falls onto the lap of Julian, making it the first time they ever see each other.

Julian is introduced as the new president of his grandfather's Amana Hotels. He had a girlfriend (Annika) who had refused his proposal for engagement to pursue her career as a beauty queen.

After Jasmine and Julian's paths are crossed, Jasmine becomes a Chinese translator for Julian. Apparently, his next project is building another hotel in China. When Jasmine earns enough money, she sends away her father into hiding, while she handles the problems made by her father. After a while, Julian resumes his search for his long-lost cousin Hannah (Nicole Uysuiseng). When he sees the resemblance between Jasmine and Hannah, he's forced to ask Jasmine to pretend to be his cousin so that his grandfather's last wish can be fulfilled. So therefore, they both are bound in a lie where no one in Julian's family can know the truth. Soon as Jasmine and Julian begin to get closer, Nico (Enchong Dee) and Annika (Nina Jose) begin to suspect that something more is going on between the two.

They soon found out the truth about Jasmine and Julian when they overhear from other people. Niko keeps it a secret but lets Jasmine and Julian know that he knows about the secret. But Anika confronts Julian about it, and when Anika cannot stand it anymore, she yells at Jasmine and tells John (DJ Durano) and Lolo Greg (Ronaldo Valdez) the truth. After Jasmine is confronted, they tell her to leave and go far away from Julian. Jasmine decides to go to Baguio to live with her father. As Julian drives home from the airport, he has no idea what happened until he was confronted by Greg. Julian threatens to leave the family but Greg has a heart attack so Julian stays.

Hannah is found and is soon reunited with her family. Everyone knows this but Julian because if Julian found out, then he would be searching for Jasmine. As Julian returns home expectantly, he sees Hannah and finds out that she is his cousin. Julian leaves the family and searches out for Jasmine. As he found Jasmine, he tries to make her stay with him. Jasmine is really headstrong and does not allow it until she finally gives in.

When everything seems normal again, Greg calls Jasmine and threatens her to leave Julian which she does. Julian follows her everywhere and does not give up on it. Jasmine wants Julian to give up so she devises a plan to get Anika to have her as a target and as a liar to the whole family. Julian decides to leave for America then. Greg decides to give Jasmine another chance for them because he does not want Julian to leave, so he asks Jasmine to chase him. Julian planned not to leave and to start over so he pretends to go on the plane and stays in Nico's house for a day. Jasmine then believes that she is too late and Julian is gone. Nico decides to bring them back together so he brings Jasmine to Julian's house and after that, they get married.

== Cast and characters ==
=== Main cast ===
Cast	Character	Summary
Kim Chiu	Jasmine Estocapio (Joo Yoo Rin)	She is from Cebu. She speaks Tagalog and Chinese. Streetsmart and optimistic, she manages to always get her and her father out of trouble. After pretending to be Hannah for Julian's sake, she falls in love with him. But Nico falls in love with Jasmine too. When the secret spills out what will happen??
Gerald Anderson	Julian Abueva (Seol Gong Chan)	A workolic who tries very hard to please those he cares about. Upon meeting Jasmine, Julian's life will get turned upside down, but for that he will fall head over heels in love with her.
Enchong Dee	Nico Legaspi (Seo Jung Woo)	With his charm and irresistible good looks, Niko can make any girl fall in love with him, except for the one girl (Jasmine) who truly captured his heart. Upon meeting her, he will discover that there's more to life than just the pleasure of women. However, as he discovers Jasmine's true identity, he will also find out her love for his best best friend Julian.
Niña Jose	Anika Ramirez (Kim Se Hyun)	A beauty queen who is Julian's ex-girlfriend. They broke up when she decided to leave him after winning a beauty pageant rather than marry him. She still continues to hope for Julian to love her again. Anika has strong feelings for Julian and wants him back, no matter what comes in her way.

=== Supporting cast ===
Cast	Character	Summary
Alex Gonzaga	Christine	If worse comes to worst, Christine is someone whom Jasmine can depend on whenever she's in trouble. Aside from being a tour guide like Jasmine, Christine also works as a beautician/hairstylist in her mother's salon parlor. Christine is looking for someone special.
Ronaldo Valdez	Gregory "Greg" Abueva	A self-made millionaire who had made cruel decisions in the past. Now that he's suffering from a serious ailment, he wants to correct his mistakes by asking Julian to find his long-lost granddaughter: Hannah
Bing Loyzaga	Bel Abueva	She's the only one her father could count on ever since her elder sister eloped with a poor man. Because of her unwavering dedication to their family, she ends up becoming a spinster who dotes on her nephew, Julian.
Lito Pimentel	Chito Estocapio	A widower who raises his daughter Jasmine the best way he knows. His lack of education, however, forces him to rely on gambling as a means of income. But because he often loses, he ends up running to Jasmine for help.
DJ Durano	John	Aside from being a loyal bodyguard/driver of Lolo Greg, he is also an aspiring sculptor who keeps his talent a secret. His stature in life stops him from revealing his long-hidden feelings for Auntie Bel.
K Brosas	Tessie Legaspi	Her late husband was Lolo Greg's business partner in their hotel chains. This company vice president is an ambitious woman who desperately wants to take over the presidency of the business.
Regine Angeles	Shiela	She is Julian's ever-efficient executive assistant and confidante in his search for his long-lost cousin. As her family's breadwinner, her job is really important to her.
David Chua	Jeffrey	He is Christine's twin brother, as well as Jasmine's close friend. This certified nerd undergoes a makeover when he meets Sheila and develops a huge crush on her.

=== Extended cast ===
Cast	Character	Summary
Nicole Uysiuseng	Hannah Abueva/Miranda Castro	She is the long-lost grand daughter of Greg Abueva, the millionaire owner of the hotel. She is the cousin of Julian. She is staying with her step auntie named Nena, until Chito unveils the truth about who she really is.
Robi Domingo	Vincent	A rich guy who met Hannah in school, also the cousin of Samboy. He owns the auto-repair shop where Samboy currently works. He is also in love with Hannah.
Josef Elizalde	Samboy	He is the so-called enemy of Tita Nena because he was courting Hannah although he is a clumsy boy who has no money and yet, he still pursues his love for Hannah.
Keanna Reeves	Nena	Hannah's step aunt who is taking care of her while her step parents are abroad. She dislikes Samboy.
Malou Crisologo	Tilde	The Mother of Cristine and Jeffrey.

== Reception ==
The Pinoy version of the hit Korean drama series, My Girl, starring Kim Chiu and Gerald Anderson, premiered May 26, 2008. It became the number one show of ABS-CBN and ranked no. 4 in AGB Nielsen Philippines in Mega Manila.

== Soundtrack ==
ABS-CBN via Star Records Philippines released the "My Girl: The Original Teleserye Soundtrack" featuring its carrier single "Sabihin Mo Na" revived by Pinoy Dream Academy alumna Yeng Constantino originally sung by Top Suzara. The album also includes "Crazy Love (Chinese version)" performed by Kim Chiu, a duet of "Sabihin Mo Na" by Kim and Gerald, "My Girl" by Sam Milby, "Gulo, Hilo, Lito," by ex-Moonstar88 vocalist Acel Van Ommen and others.

Track list:

1. My Girl by Sam Milby
2. Sabihin Mo Na by Yeng Constantino
3. Crazy Love (Chinese Version) by Kim Chiu
4. Gulo, Hilo, Lito by Acel van Ommen
5. Kahit 'Di Mo Napapansin by Richard Poon
6. Pusong Lito by Kim Chiu
7. Sabihin Mo Na by Kim Chiu & Gerald Anderson

== Trivia ==
- The mansion used to film the home of the Abuevas is used again as a setting during the production of the Kim Chiu and Gerald Anderson series Ikaw Lang ang Iibigin (2017–18). It features as a safe house and secondary home during the latter episodes of the series.
- Xian Lim makes a cameo in the series finale as a wedding photographer.

== See also ==
- List of programs broadcast by ABS-CBN
- List of ABS-CBN Studios original drama series
