= List of Philippine television ratings for 2008 =

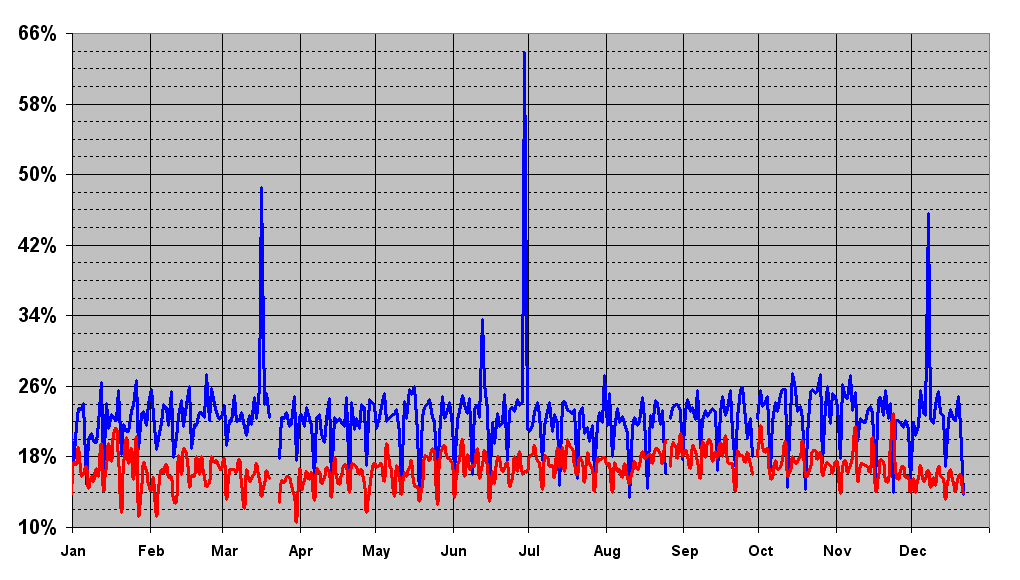
Daytime ratings for 2008: GMA is blue and ABS-CBN is red; the three highest GMA spikes indicate GMA's broadcast of Manny Pacquiao's bouts, the smallest spike indicates GMA's coverage of Rudy Fernandez's burial.

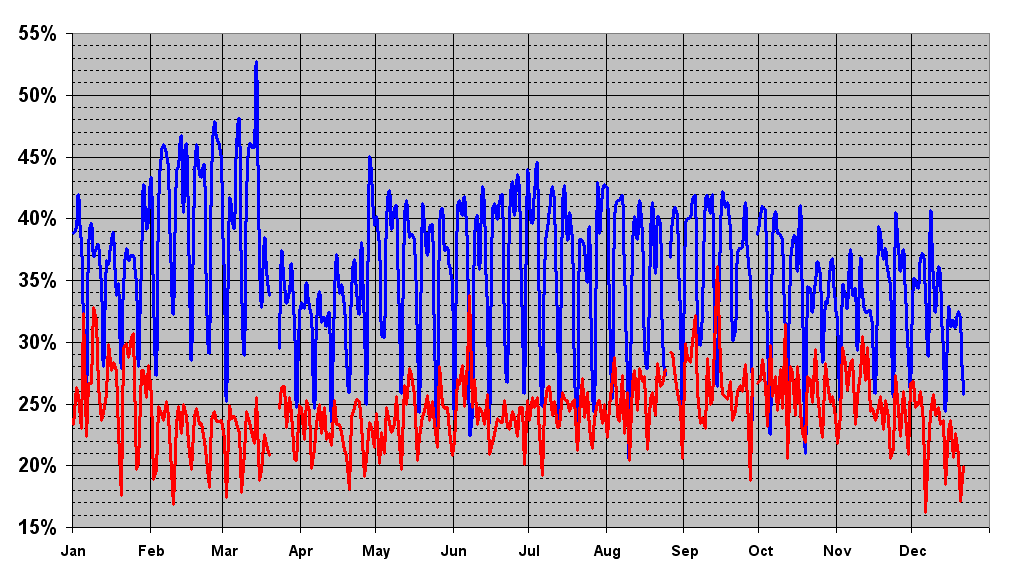
Primetime ratings for 2008: GMA is blue and ABS-CBN is red; the highest spike refers to the Marimar finale. The spike for GMA's primetime chart on April was the premiere of Dyesebel. ABS-CBN's two largest spikes come from the finales of Pinoy Big Brother: Teen Edition Plus and Pinoy Dream Academy.

The following is a list of Philippine television ratings for 2008 coming from AGB Nielsen Philippines.

Mega Manila accounts for about 48% of total TV households in urban Philippines. The Mega Manila and Luzon markets combined account for about 76% of the total TV households in urban Philippines. Non-urban households aren't included in both Mega Manila and NUTAM surveys.

The largest television market is at Mega Manila; in AGB-Nielsen's case, Mega Manila consists of Metro Manila, Bulacan, Rizal, Cavite and Laguna. Metro Manila and other urban areas in the Philippines comprise the National Urban Television Audience Measurement (NUTAM) and are scattered throughout the country.

== Markets ==
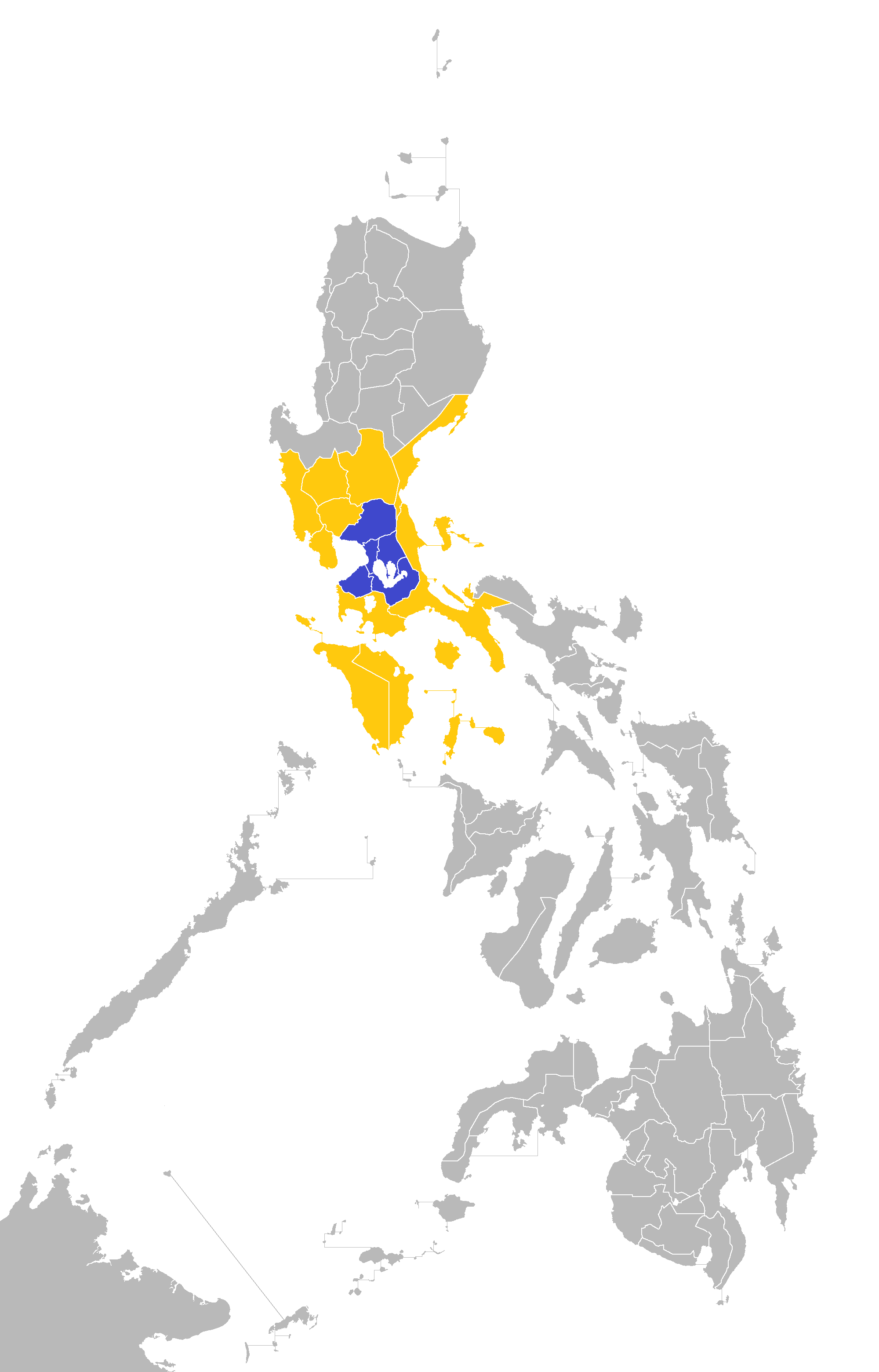
Location of Mega Manila within the Philippines: Blue for AGB Nielsen.

Note that the National Urban Television Audience Measurement (NUTAM) does not represent the entire Philippines but only urban areas; NUTAM markets comprise 39% of the entire country. The Mega Manila market comprises 52% of the NUTAM market.

== National Urban Television Audience Measurement ==
In national urbal Philippines, the three Manny Pacquiao boxing bouts scored the highest ratings, each surpassing 45%, making GMA airing the top three aired programs in urban Philippines. The finales of Pinoy Big Brother: Teen Edition Plus and Pinoy Dream Academy were next, and the finale of MariMar rounded up the top 5.

=== Most watched programs ===
| Rank | Network | Broadcast | Period | Rating | Reference |
|---|---|---|---|---|---|
| 1 | GMA | Unfinished Business: Marquez-Pacquiao II* | March | 48.6% | PEP.ph |
| 2= | GMA | The Dream Match: De La Hoya vs. Pacquiao* | December | 46.0% | PEP.ph |
| 2= | ABS-CBN | Lobo | 1/27–2/2 | 36.3% | PEP.ph |
| 4 | ABS-CBN | Pinoy Big Brother: Teen Edition Plus: The Big Night | June | 42.4% | PEP.ph |
| 5 | ABS-CBN | Pinoy Dream Academy: Grand Dream Nights | September | 40.4% | PEP.ph |
| 6 | GMA | Marimar | March | 38.1% | PEP.ph |
| 7 | ABS-CBN | Pinoy Dream Academy: Little Dream Night | October | 37.5% | PEP.ph |
| 8 | ABS-CBN | Kung Fu Kids | 1/27–2/2 | 37.1% | PEP.ph |
| 9 | GMA | Marimar | February | 36.9% | PEP.ph |

== Mega Manila ==
=== Weekly ratings ===
Week 1 began on December 30, 2007, and ended on January 5, 2008. The list will be updated every Sunday, when the week ends.

AGB Nielsen defines "non-primetime" as prior to 6:30 pm and "primetime" as after 6:30 pm up to sign-off.

GMA almost swept the weekly non-primetime and primetime races, if not for ABS-CBN's broadcast of the Hatton-Malinggagi bout that beat the GMA programs for the week of November 23–29. ABS-CBN fared better in weekend programming, but generally, ratings during the weekend are lower than their weekday counterparts.

ABS-CBN won the primetime race during these days, all of them occurred during the weekend:

- June 7: Airing of Pinoy Big Brother: Teen Edition Plus: The Big Night
- June 8: Airing of Pinoy Big Brother: Teen Edition Plus: The Big Reunion
- August 3: Airing of Pinoy Dream Academy: Little Dreamers
- August 24: Airing of Pinoy Dream Academy: Little Dreamers
- September 13 and 14: Airing of Pinoy Dream Academy
- September 28: Airing of Pinoy Dream Academy: Little Dreamers
- October 5: Airing of Pinoy Dream Academy: Little Dreamers
- October 11: Airing of Maalaala Mo Kaya
- October 19: Airing of Rated K

Aside from Manny Pacquiao's bouts, two programs starring Marian Rivera, Marimar and Dyesebel were the top-rating programs of the year, rating between the high-thirties and the mid-forties; in fact, ABS-CBN closed the gap whenever Marian Rivera's programs are not on-air.

Eat Bulaga! remains the most consistent non-primetime program, despite being challenged by GMA's Sine Novelas.

No ratings were published on March 20–22 (Holy Week), August 25 and September 29.

| Week ending | Non-primetime | | | Primetime | | |
| Week ending | Network | Episode | Rating | Network | Episode | Rating |
|---|---|---|---|---|---|---|
| 1/5 | GMA | Eat Bulaga! (January 5) | 24.1% | GMA | Marimar (January 3) | 42.0% |
| 1/12 | GMA | Eat Bulaga! (January 12) | 26.4% | GMA | Marimar (January 8) | 39.6% |
| 1/19 | GMA | Eat Bulaga! (January 19) | 25.5% | GMA | Marimar (January 17) | 38.8% |
| 1/26 | GMA | Eat Bulaga! (January 26) | 26.7% | GMA | Marimar (January 22) | 37.5% |
| 2/2 | GMA | Eat Bulaga! (February 1) | 25.6% | GMA | Marimar (February 1) | 43.1% |
| 2/9 | GMA | Eat Bulaga! (February 9) | 25.4% | GMA | Marimar (February 6) | 46.0% |
| 2/16 | GMA | Eat Bulaga! (February 16) | 26.0% | GMA | Marimar (February 13) | 46.7% |
| 2/23 | GMA | Eat Bulaga! (February 23) | 27.4% | GMA | Marimar (February 19) | 46.0% |
| 3/1 | GMA | Eat Bulaga! (February 25) | 25.8% | GMA | Marimar (February 26) | 47.8% |
| 3/8 | GMA | Eat Bulaga! (March 5) | 25.0% | GMA | Marimar (March 7) | 47.9% |
| 3/15 | GMA | Eat Bulaga! (March 15) | 25.8% | GMA | Marimar (March 14) | 52.6% |
| 3/22 | GMA | Unfinished Business: Pacquiao-Marquez II | 48.5% | GMA | Joaquin Bordado (March 17) | 38.4% |
| 3/29 | GMA | Eat Bulaga! (March 29) | 24.8% | GMA | Kamandag (March 28) | 37.3% |
| 4/5 | GMA | Eat Bulaga! (April 3) | 23.6% | GMA | Kamandag (April 3) | 34.8% |
| 4/12 | GMA | Eat Bulaga! (April 12) | 24.6% | GMA | Joaquin Bordado (April 8) | 34.1% |
| 4/19 | GMA | Eat Bulaga! (April 19) | 24.7% | GMA | Joaquin Bordado (April 15) | 37.1% |
| 4/26 | GMA | Eat Bulaga! (April 21) | 24.2% | GMA | Kamandag (April 25) | 38.1% |
| 5/3 | GMA | Eat Bulaga! (April 28) | 24.5% | GMA | Dyesebel (April 28) | 44.9% |
| 5/10 | GMA | Dyesebel: Ang Simula (May 4) | 25.2% | GMA | Dyesebel (May 6) | 42.3% |
| 5/17 | GMA | Magdusa Ka (May 16) | 26.0% | GMA | Dyesebel (May 13) | 41.5% |
| 5/24 | GMA | Kaputol ng Isang Awit (May 22) | 24.5% | GMA | Dyesebel (May 19) | 41.1% |
| 5/31 | GMA | Kaputol ng Isang Awit (May 27) | 24.8% | GMA | Dyesebel (May 27) | 40.8% |
| 6/7 | GMA | Magdusa Ka (June 4) | 25.0% | GMA | Dyesebel (June 5) | 41.7% |
| 6/14 | GMA | GMA Flash Report: Daboy's Burial | 33.6% | GMA | Dyesebel (June 12) | 42.5% |
| 6/21 | GMA | Wish Ko Lang (June 22) | 25.1% | GMA | Dyesebel (June 20) | 41.9% |
| 6/28 | GMA | Eat Bulaga! (June 26) | 24.5% | GMA | Dyesebel (June 24) | 43.6% |
| 7/5 | GMA | Pacquiao vs. Diaz: Lethal Combination | 63.8% | GMA | Dyesebel (July 4) | 44.3% |
| 7/12 | GMA | Gaano Kadalas ang Minsan (July 8) | 24.2% | GMA | Dyesebel (July 11) | 41.0% |
| 7/19 | GMA | Magdusa Ka (July 15) | 24.3% | GMA | Dyesebel (July 15) | 42.7% |
| 7/26 | GMA | Gaano Kadalas ang Minsan (July 22) | 23.6% | GMA | Dyesebel (July 25) | 39.1% |
| 8/2 | GMA | Gaano Kadalas ang Minsan (July 31) | 27.2% | GMA | Dyesebel (July 31) | 42.8% |
| 8/9 | GMA | Eat Bulaga! (August 5) | 23.5% | GMA | Dyesebel (August 7) | 41.8% |
| 8/15 | GMA | Magdusa Ka (August 15) | 24.7% | GMA | Dyesebel (August 14) | 41.5% |
| 8/23 | GMA | Magdusa Ka (August 20) | 24.4% | GMA | Dyesebel (August 19) | 41.3% |
| 8/30 | GMA | Magdusa Ka (August 29) | 24.0% | GMA | Dyesebel (August 28) | 40.9% |
| 9/6 | GMA | Eat Bulaga! (September 6) | 25.5% | GMA | Dyesebel (September 5) | 41.8% |
| 9/13 | GMA | Eat Bulaga! (September 12) | 23.5% | GMA | Dyesebel (September 10) | 41.9% |
| 9/20 | GMA | Gaano Kadalas ang Minsan (September 19) | 25.5% | GMA | Dyesebel (September 16) | 42.1% |
| 9/27 | GMA | Gaano Kadalas ang Minsan (September 24) | 25.9% | GMA | Dyesebel (September 25) | 41.3% |
| 10/4 | GMA | Gaano Kadalas ang Minsan (October 1) | 25.5% | GMA | Dyesebel (October 2) | 41.0% |
| 10/11 | GMA | Eat Bulaga! (October 11) | 25.7% | GMA | Dyesebel (October 7) | 40.6% |
| 10/18 | GMA | Eat Bulaga! (October 14) | 27.5% | GMA | Dyesebel (October 17) | 41.1% |
| 10/25 | GMA | Eat Bulaga! (October 25) | 27.4% | GMA | Gagambino (October 24) | 36.5% |
| 11/1 | GMA | Eat Bulaga! (October 28) | 26.0% | GMA | Gagambino (October 24) | 36.7% |
| 11/8 | GMA | Gaano Kadalas ang Minsan (November 6) | 26.0% | GMA | Gagambino (November 6) | 37.5% |
| 11/15 | GMA | Eat Bulaga! (November 14) | 23.7% | GMA | Survivor Philippines (November 6) | 36.8% |
| 11/22 | GMA | Una Kang Naging Akin (November 20) | 25.5% | GMA | Gagambino (November 17) | 39.3% |
| 11/29 | ABS-CBN | The Hitman vs. The Magician: Ricky Hatton vs. Paulie Malignaggi | 22.9% | GMA | Luna Mystika (November 24) | 40.2% |
| 12/6 | GMA | Eat Bulaga! (December 4) | 25.5% | GMA | Luna Mystika (December 5) | 37.1% |
| 12/13 | GMA | The Dream Match: De La Hoya vs. Pacquiao | 45.6% | GMA | 24 Oras (December 8) | 40.6% |
| 12/20 | GMA | Una Kang Naging Akin (December 19) | 24.9% | GMA | Luna Mystika (December 15) | 32.7% |

== See also ==
- AGB Nielsen Philippine TV ratings controversy

| Preceded by 2007 | Philippine TV ratings per year 2008 | Succeeded by 2009 |
