= List of Philippine television ratings for 2009 =

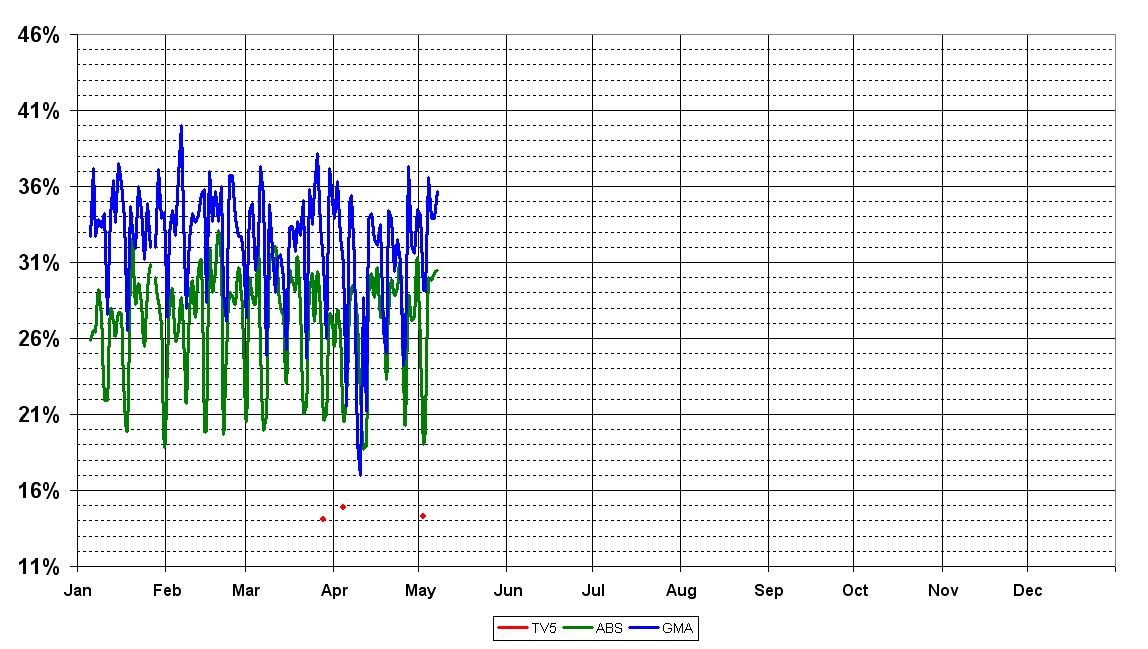
Non-primetime TV ratings of the day's top-rating programs in Mega Manila from ABS-CBN, GMA and TV5 (if they crack the top 10 for that day) as provided by AGB Nielsen.

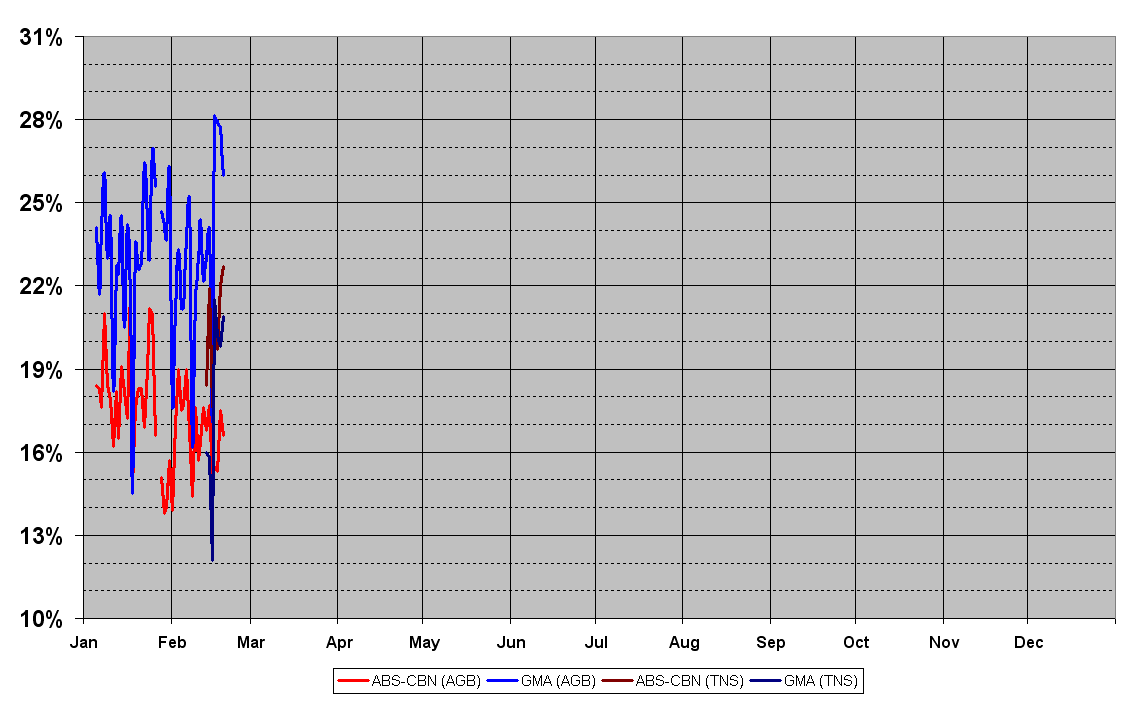
Primetime TV ratings of the day's top-rating programs in Mega Manila from ABS-CBN, GMA and TV5 (if they crack the top 10 for that day) as provided by AGB Nielsen.

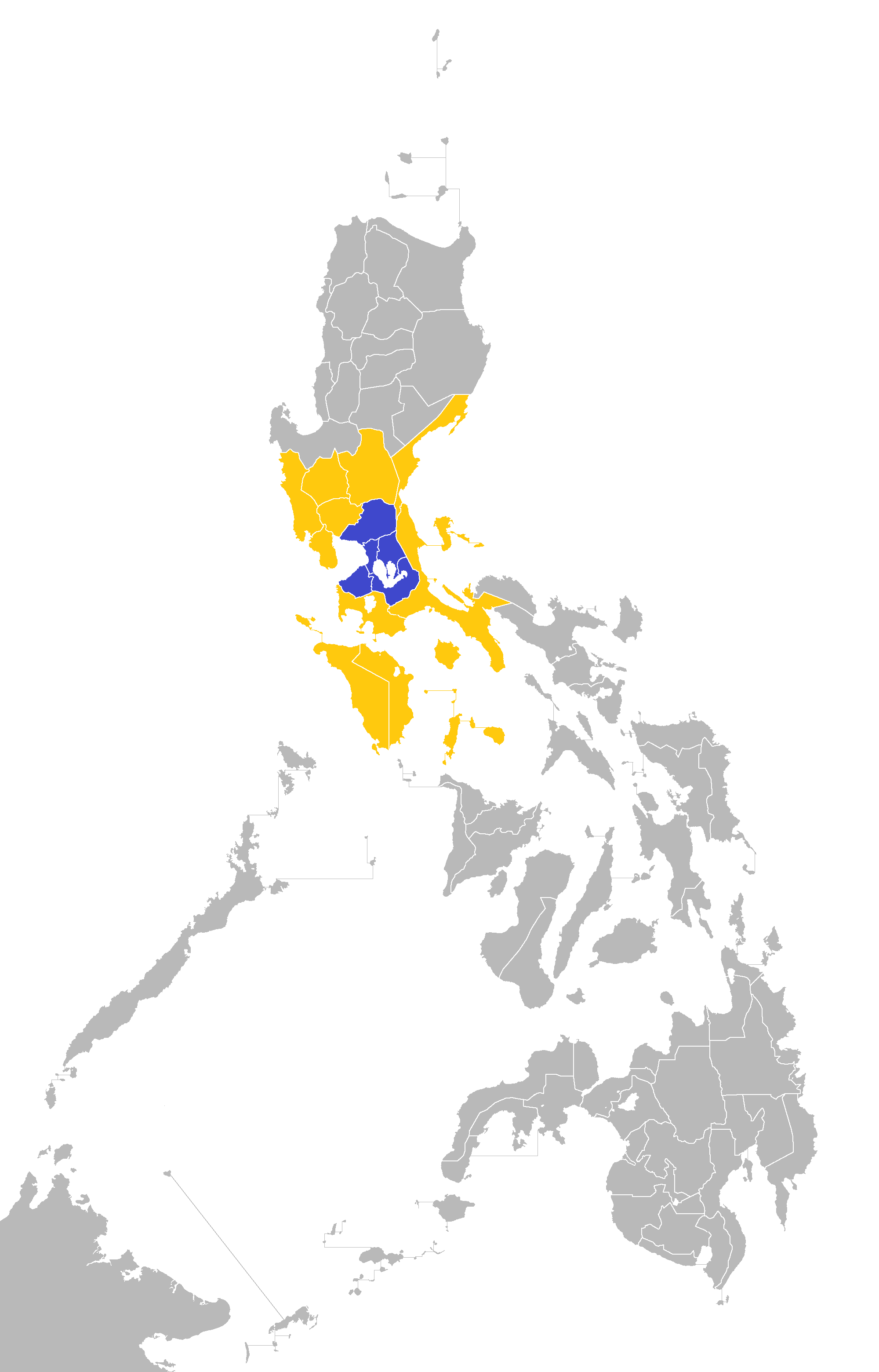
Location of Mega Manila within the Philippines: Maroon for AGB Nielsen.

The following is a list of Philippine television ratings for 2009 coming from AGB Nielsen Philippines (AGB) and Taylor Nelson Sofres (TNS).

For AGB Nielsen, Mega Manila accounts for about 48% of total TV households in urban Philippines. The Mega Manila and Luzon markets combined account for about 67% of the total TV households in urban Philippines. Non-urban households aren't included in both Mega Manila and NUTAM surveys. For TNS, Mega Manila comprises about 56% of national households.

== Markets ==
Note that the National Urban Television Audience Measurement (NUTAM) does not represent the entire Philippines but only urban areas; NUTAM markets comprise 39% of the entire country. The Mega Manila market comprises 55% of the NUTAM market.

== National Urban Television Audience Measurement ==
Monthly NUTAM ratings from AGB will be available after January.

=== Weekly TNS ratings ===
No ratings data for the Philippines were published prior to February 13.

Week ending	Non-primetime			Primetime		
Week ending	Network	Episode	Rating	Network	Episode	Rating
2/14	ABS-CBN	Wowowee (February 14)	21.9%	ABS-CBN	Tayong Dalawa (February 13)	38.9%
2/21	ABS-CBN	Wowowee (February 19)	22.7%	ABS-CBN	Tayong Dalawa (February 19)	40.9%
2/28	ABS-CBN	Wowowee (February 28)	26.2%	ABS-CBN	Tayong Dalawa (February 26)	40.6%
3/7	GMA	Eat Bulaga! (March 7)	25.6%	ABS-CBN	Tayong Dalawa (March 5)	39.9%
3/14	GMA	Eat Bulaga! (March 11)	25.0%	ABS-CBN	Tayong Dalawa (March 5)	41.8%
3/21	ABS-CBN	Wowowee (March 19)	23.2%	ABS-CBN	May Bukas Pa (March 17)	40.9%
3/28	ABS-CBN	Wowowee (March 27)	24.9%	ABS-CBN	Tayong Dalawa (March 25 & 27)	38.2%
4/4	ABS-CBN	Wowowee (April 2)	25.3%	ABS-CBN	Tayong Dalawa (April 2)	39.6%
4/11	ABS-CBN	Wowowee (April 7)	23.9%	ABS-CBN	Tayong Dalawa (April 8)	37.0%
4/18	ABS-CBN	Wowowee (April 16)	24.7%	ABS-CBN	Tayong Dalawa (April 16)	41.6%
4/25	GMA	The Fast and the Furious boxing card	27.9%	ABS-CBN	Tayong Dalawa (April 20)	40.2%
5/2	ABS-CBN	Wowowee (April 30)	27.1%	ABS-CBN	Tayong Dalawa (April 27)	40.3%
5/9	GMA	The Battle of East and West: Pacquiao vs. Hatton	41.9%	ABS-CBN	Tayong Dalawa (May 4)	39.4%
5/16	ABS-CBN	Wowowee (May 13)	24.8%	ABS-CBN	Tayong Dalawa (May 11 & 12); May Bukas Pa (May 12)	38.7%

== Mega Manila ==
=== Weekly AGB ratings ===
No ratings data were released on January 1–4.

Week ending	Non-primetime			Primetime		
Week ending	Network	Episode	Rating	Network	Episode	Rating
1/10	GMA	Eat Bulaga! (January 8)	26.1%	GMA	Luna Mystika (January 6)	37.2%
1/17	GMA	Eat Bulaga! (January 14)	24.5%	GMA	Luna Mystika (January 15)	37.5%
1/24	GMA	Eat Bulaga! (January 22)	26.4%	GMA	Luna Mystika (January 22)	36.0%
1/31	GMA	Eat Bulaga! (January 31)	26.1%	GMA	Luna Mystika (January 29)	37.1%
2/7	GMA	Eat Bulaga! (February 7)	25.1%	GMA	LaLola (February 6)	40.0%
2/14	GMA	Saan Darating ang Umaga? (February 11)	24.4%	GMA	Imbestigador (February 14)	35.8%
2/21	GMA	Saan Darating ang Umaga? (February 16)	28.1%	GMA	Luna Mystika (February 16)	37.0%
2/28	GMA	Saan Darating ang Umaga? (February 27)	27.3%	GMA	Totoy Bato (February 23 & 24)	36.7%
3/7	GMA	Eat Bulaga! (March 7)	35.3%	GMA	Luna Mystika (March 6)	37.3%
3/14	GMA	Eat Bulaga! (March 11)	31.3%	GMA	Totoy Bato (March 9)	34.8%
3/21	GMA	Paano Ba Ang Mangarap? (March 18)	25.3%	GMA	Kapuso Mo, Jessica Soho (March 21)	35.1%
3/28	GMA	Dapat Ka Bang Mahalin? (March 27); Eat Bulaga! (March 28)	24.6%	GMA	Totoy Bato (March 21)	35.1%
4/4	GMA	Dapat Ka Bang Mahalin? (April 1)	29.9%	GMA	Totoy Bato (March 30)	37.2%
4/11	GMA	The Promise (April 10)	28.2%	GMA	Totoy Bato (April 7)	35.4%
4/18	GMA	Dapat Ka Bang Mahalin? (April 16)	27.0%	GMA	Totoy Bato (April 14)	34.2%
4/25	GMA	Dapat Ka Bang Mahalin? (April 16)	27.0%	GMA	Totoy Bato (April 14)	34.2%
5/2	GMA	Dapat Ka Bang Mahalin? (April 30)	32.4%	GMA	Totoy Bato (April 27)	37.3%
5/9	GMA	The Battle of East and West Main Event: Pacquiao vs. Hatton	43.0%	GMA	24 Oras (May 4)	36.6%
5/16	GMA	Dapat Ka Bang Mahalin? (May 15)	29.0%	GMA	Zorro (May 11)	36.6%

Preceded by 2008	Philippine TV ratings per year 2009	Succeeded by 2010
