= AGB Nielsen Philippine TV ratings controversy =

Legal dispute

The AGB Nielsen Philippine TV ratings controversy was a legal dispute involving AGB Nielsen Philippines, GMA Network, Inc., and ABS-CBN Corporation over an alleged television ratings breach in the Western Visayas cities of Bacolod and Iloilo. The controversy began in the final quarter of 2007 and continued into 2008.

== Background ==
AGB Nielsen Philippines

ABS-CBN Corporation

On December 20, 2007, Judge Charito Gonzales of the Quezon City Regional Trial Court, Branch 80, issued a temporary restraining order (TRO) on TV ratings surveys in connection with a civil case filed by ABS-CBN Corporation against AGB Nielsen Media Research Philippines. ABS-CBN accused its rival, GMA Network, of financing bribery operations in Bacolod to discredit the network. The court also directed ABS-CBN to submit a comment on AGB Nielsen's plea regarding the alleged gathering and dissemination of television ratings data within five days, or by December 22.

On December 21, 2007, DZMM correspondent Junrie Hidalgo reported a news story titled "AGB Nielsen, umamin sa dayaan: GMA Network, tahasang itinurong nasa likod ng dayaan" ("AGB Nielsen admits to cheating: GMA Network directly accused of being behind the fraud") during the program Showbiz Mismo, hosted by Cristy Fermin and Jobert Sucaldito. The report was based on an interview with AGB Nielsen's General Manager, Maya Reforma, regarding the alleged cheating.

In response, GMA Network aired a television plug condemning the alleged biased reporting and denied ABS-CBN's accusations. On January 3, 2008, GMA filed a PHP 15-million civil libel suit against ABS-CBN. The respondents included Junrie Hidalgo, Cristy Fermin, Jobert Sucaldito, the station manager and news manager of DZMM, as well as the hosts, writers, and executive producers of the television programs Bandila, Entertainment Live, and The Buzz, after the same story was aired on these programs.

On January 7, 2008, the Quezon City Regional Trial Court (RTC) dismissed ABS-CBN's lawsuit against AGB Nielsen, ruling that the case was "prematurely filed" before the court. Judge Charito Gonzales based the decision on the principle of mutuality of contracts, citing Articles 1308 and 1196 of the New Civil Code of the Philippines. Meanwhile, Judge Samuel Gaerlan of the Quezon City RTC, Branch 92, issued court summons to ABS-CBN and 15 of its personnel in connection with GMA Network's PHP 15-million damages suit.

On January 17, 2008, Judge Samuel Gaerlan recused himself from the case due to a conflict of interest with ABS-CBN's legal department. The case was later re-raffled on January 28, 2008, and was eventually assigned to Judge Henri Inting of Branch 95 of the Quezon City Regional Trial Court (QCRTC). Judge Inting submitted GMA Network's petition for a temporary restraining order (TRO) for decision.

On February 1, 2008, ABS-CBN presented two witnesses, Romie Diamanse and Francis Casumpang, who claimed that RGMA head Mike Enriquez had allegedly given the order to manipulate TV ratings during a meeting. Enriquez denied the accusations, calling the statements "shameless, malicious fiction delivered by tainted informers with an axe to grind."

Diamanse and Casumpang were former employees of RGMA's 93.5 Campus Radio Iloilo (now Barangay FM 93.5 Iloilo). Casumpang resigned from the station after facing charges of embezzlement and later joined ABS-CBN's MOR 91.1 Iloilo. Meanwhile, RGMA accepted Diamanse's resignation, stating that he was "ineffective in his duties."

An anonymous witness approached ABS-CBN stations in Cebu, Davao, and Iloilo, claiming that alleged employees of GMA Network were bribing households to watch their programs. Another witness from Davao testified that they were instructed to watch GMA programs in exchange for grocery items after it was discovered that their household was using an AGB metering panel. At the end of the month, a group of women reportedly visited the witness's house to deliver grocery items, including canned goods.

A separate witness from Iloilo alleged that their household was offered financial assistance covering half of their electricity expenses in exchange for watching GMA programs. She claimed that "employees" visited monthly to deliver grocery items and presented identification cards bearing the GMA logo. The group was also said to have distributed promotional items such as umbrellas, plastic cups, and towels with the GMA logo. GMA Network denied any involvement, stating that they had not hired individuals to conduct door-to-door visits for alleged ratings manipulation.

On February 14, 2008, Judge Henri Inting issued a temporary restraining order (TRO) barring ABS-CBN from airing defamatory statements against GMA Network.

On March 31, 2026, the Supreme Court dismissed a complaint filed by GMA Network against ABS-CBN. It ruled that the statements aired by ABS-CBN constitute a fair and true report since it was based on documentary evidence.

== See also ==
- List of Philippine television ratings for 2008
- 1972 Martial law under Ferdinand Marcos
- Banahaw Broadcasting Corporation
- Shutdown of ABS-CBN broadcasting
