= Totoy Bato (2009 TV series) =

2009 Philippine television drama series

- Title card
- Genre: Sports drama
- Based on: Totoy Bato by Carlo J. Caparas
- Developed by: Suzette Doctolero
- Directed by: Mac Alejandre; Don Michael Perez
- Starring: Robin Padilla
- Theme music composer: Ogie Alcasid
- Opening theme: "Ako'y sa 'Yo" by Regine Velasquez
- Country of origin: Philippines
- Original language: Tagalog
- No. of episodes: 93

Production
- Executive producer: Joseph Buncalan
- Camera setup: Multiple-camera setup
- Running time: 30–45 minutes
- Production company: GMA Entertainment TV

Original release
- Network: GMA Network
- Release: February 23 – July 3, 2009

Related
- Totoy Bato (2025)

Totoy Bato is a 2009 Philippine television drama sports series broadcast by GMA Network. The series is based on the graphic novel created by Carlo J. Caparas. Directed by Mac Alejandre and Don Michael Perez, it stars Robin Padilla in the title role. It premiered on February 23, 2009 on the network's Telebabad line up. The series concluded on July 3, 2009, with a total of 93 episodes.

The series was released on DVD by GMA Records.

== Cast and characters ==
Cast

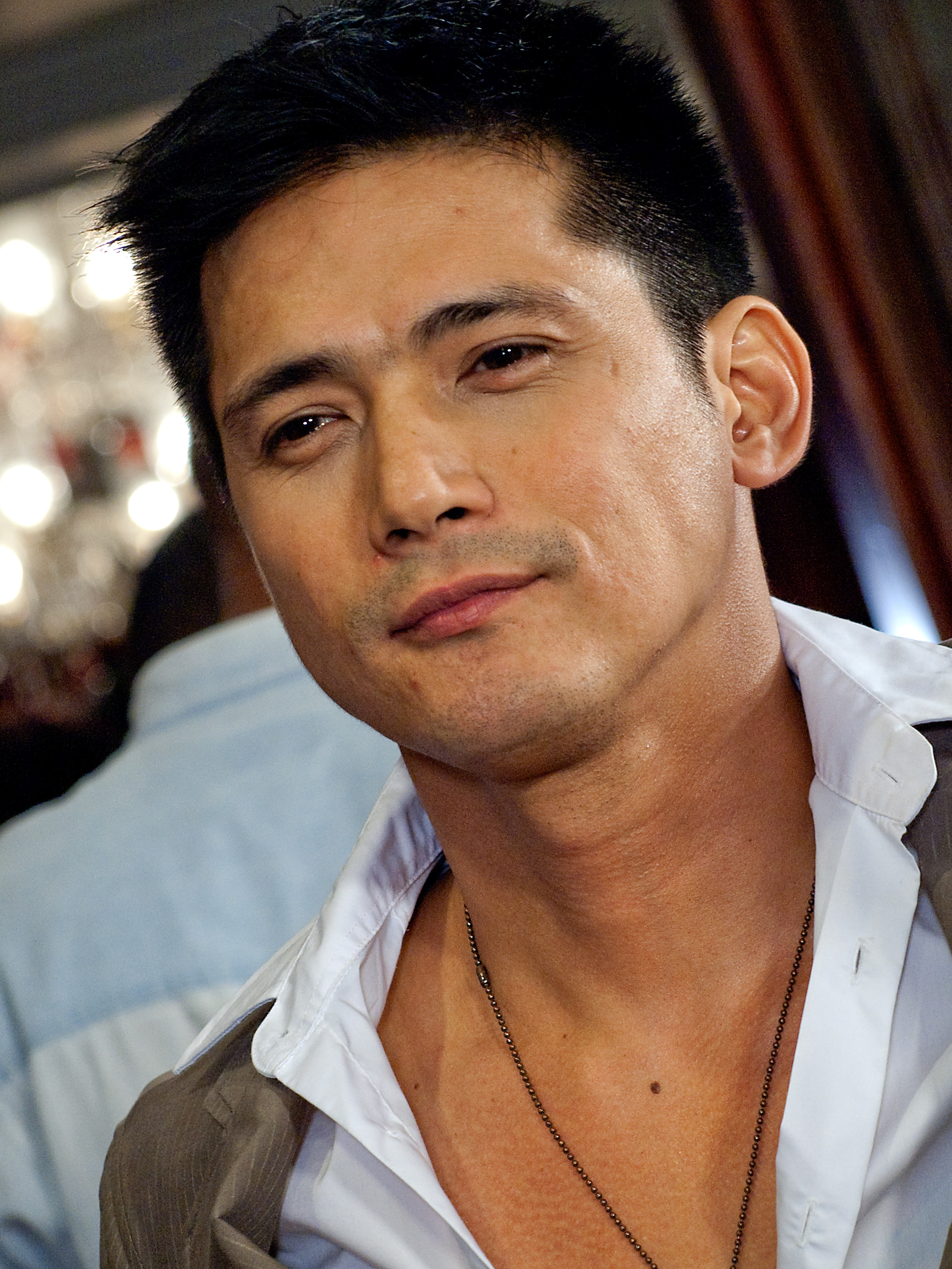
Robin Padilla

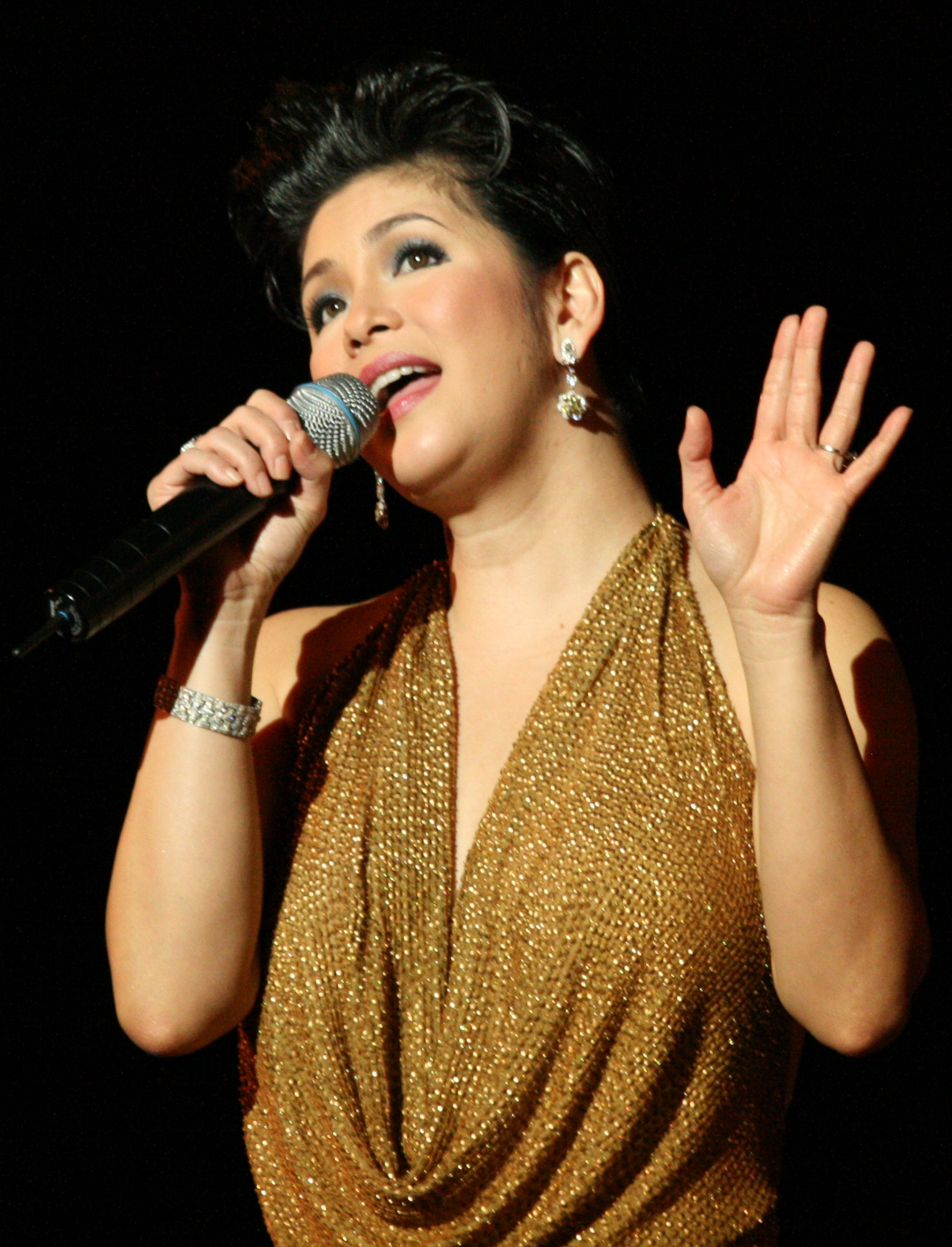
Regine Velasquez

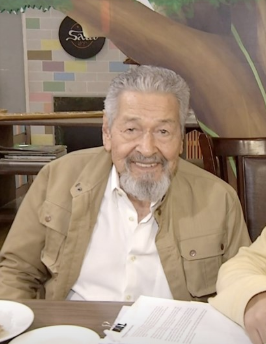
Eddie Garcia

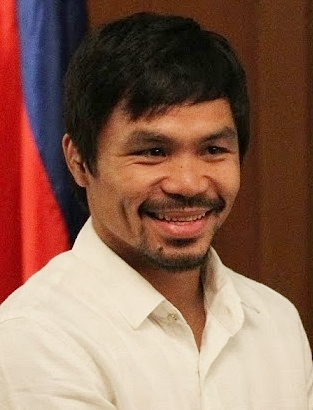
Manny Pacquiao

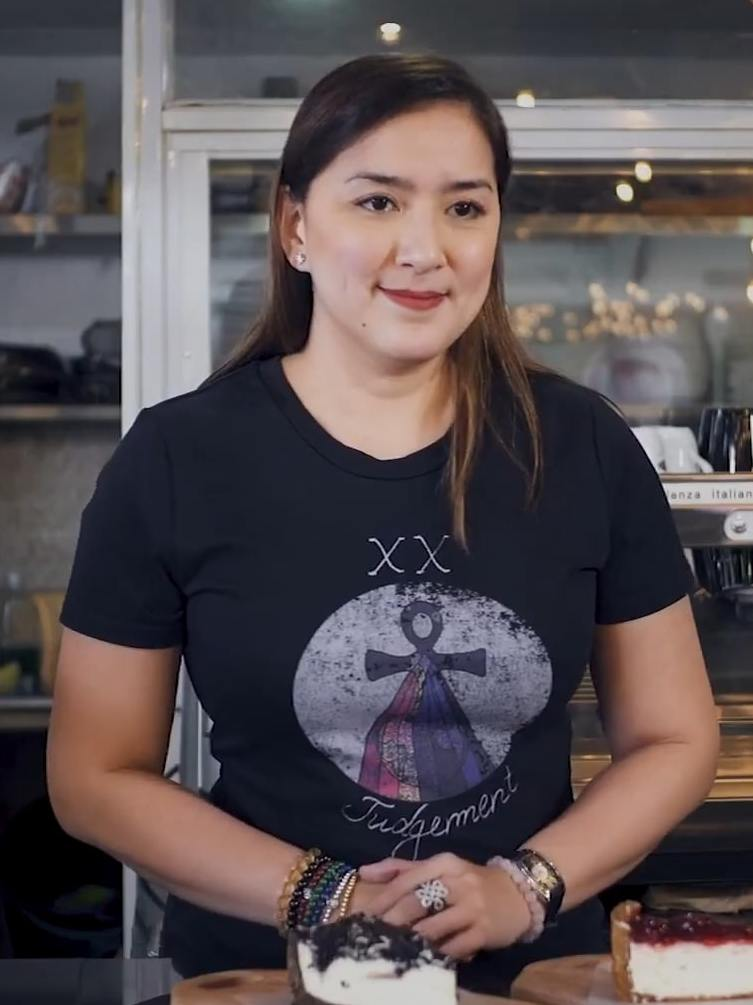
Ara Mina

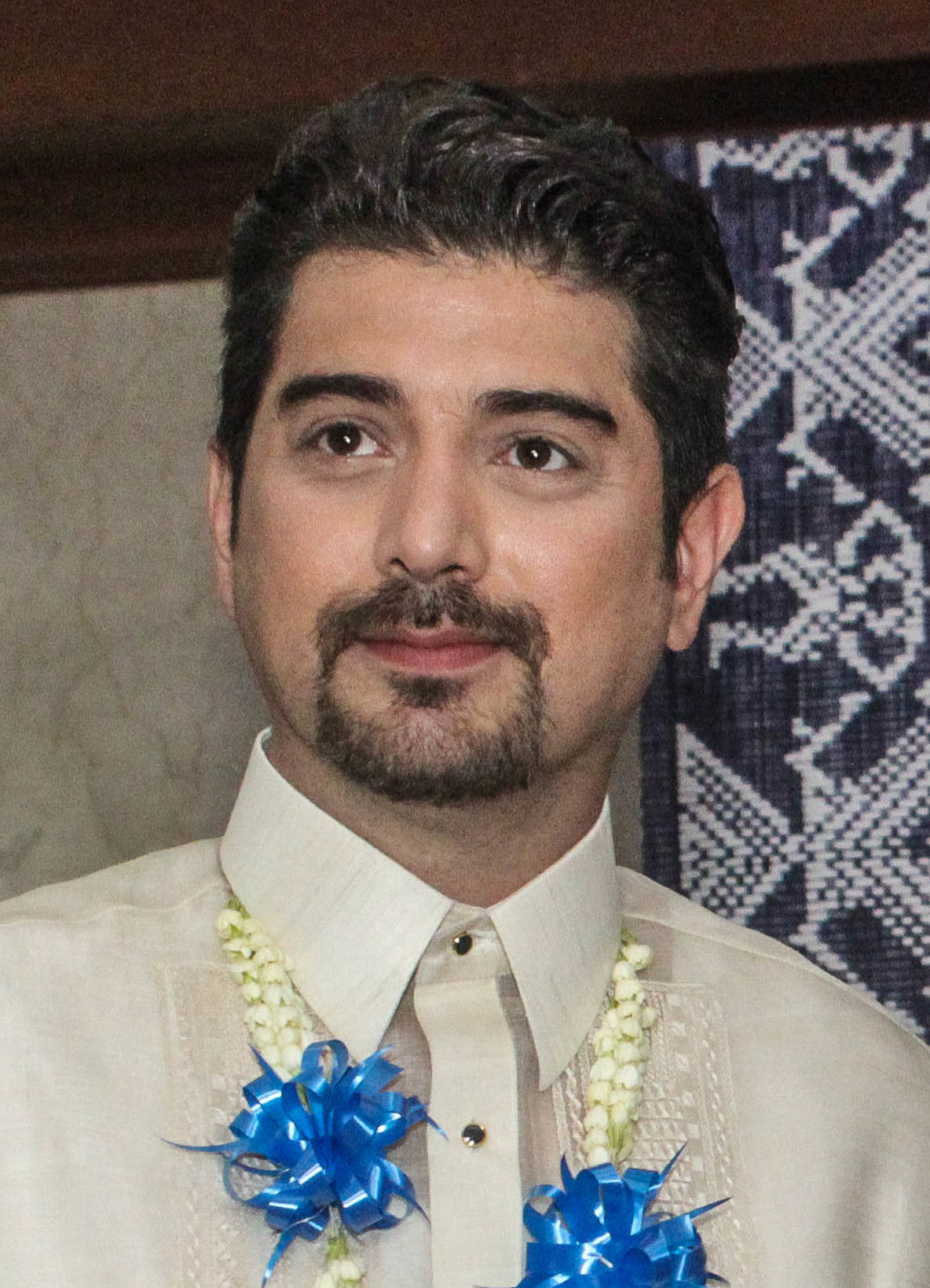
Ian Veneracion

Lead cast

- Robin Padilla as Arturo "Totoy Bato" Magtanggol

Supporting cast

- Regine Velasquez as Anna Molina
- Eddie Garcia as Fredo
- Manny Pacquiao as himself
- Ehra Madrigal as Trixie Altamirano-Magtanggol
- Ara Mina as Elena Magtanggol
- Ian Veneracion as Miguel Velarde
- Caridad Sanchez as Concha Velarde
- Joonee Gamboa as Mauro Magtanggol
- Ronnie Lazaro as Podong Magtanggol
- Rommel Padilla as Manuel Velarde
- Deborah Sun as Matilda Molina
- Jolo Revilla as Andong
- LJ Reyes as Gilette Molina
- Tuesday Vargas as Connie
- Mon Confiado as Turko Manzano
- Sweet Ramos as Cecilia Magtanggol
- Ralph Padilla as Steve Altamirano
- Queenie Padilla as Heather Hernandez

Recurring cast

- Menggie Cobarrubas as a mayor
- BJ Forbes as Bogart
- Martin Delos Santos as Boyet
- Kirby de Jesus as Sakrestan
- Val Iglesias Sr. as Temi
- Val Iglesias Jr. as Ruben
- Joseph Bitangcol as a doctor
- Jun Hidalgo as Berong
- Jessy Mendiola as Maurice / Light Milton
- Bela Padilla as Rain
- Carlo Aquino as teenage Totoy
- Camille Prats as teenage Anna
- July Hidalgo as Millton / Dark Milton
- Ernie Garcia as Cecillia's doctor
- Gay Balignasay as a news reporter
- John Apacible
- Dido dela Paz
- Ricardo Cepeda
- Michael Flores

== Production ==
Principal photography commenced in January 2009.

== Ratings ==
According to AGB Nielsen Philippines' Mega Manila household television ratings, the pilot episode of Totoy Bato earned a 36.7% rating. The final episode scored a 30.4% rating.

== Accolades ==
Accolades received by Totoy Bato
Year	Award	Category	Recipient	Result	Ref.
2009	23rd PMPC Star Awards for Television	Best New Female TV Personality	Queenie Padilla	Nominated	
