= Pinoy Dream Academy: Little Dreamers =

Children's singing competition segment of Pinoy Dream Academy Season 2, aired in 2008

- Hosted by: Toni Gonzaga; Nikki Gil; Billy Crawford
- Winner: Philip Nadela

Release
- Original release: June 14, 2008

The second season of Pinoy Dream Academy formally began on June 14, 2008. Nikki Gil and Toni Gonzaga reprise their roles as hosts of the show, but Gonzaga now handles the main hosting plum while Gil appears both on the Probation Nights and Little Dreamers Gala/Expulsion Night. Billy Crawford has joined this season as the host of the late afternoon edition Pinoy Dream Academy Überture.

A new logo is also used for this season, having an old-fashioned microphone and the word "Dream" using a different font than the rest of the title. Also, a new version of the theme song Awit ng Pangarap sung by first season winner Yeng Constantino is being used for this season, although the original version was also used, especially during Gala Nights.

New to this season was a "Little Dreamers" competition for children aged 6 to 10. On July 6, 2008, twelve children were chosen to become the academy's resident Little Scholars. In this end, a new puppet named Billilit (portmanteau of "Billy" and bulilit or kid) joins the show as semi-host and Billy's sidekick on Übertube as far as any topic regarding this side competition is concerned.

The Little Dreamers competition continued for several weekends after the season finale of the second season for the "adults" on September 13 and 14, 2008. The Little Dreamers took part on the said season finale despite this. The competition ended on October 5, 2008, at the Dolphy Theatre of the ABS-CBN building, and was replaced by The Singing Bee.

== Little Dreamers ==
The Little Dreamers competition was started on July 6, 2008, for children who are six to ten years old. Twelve children were chosen to compete in this side competition, taking place within the duration of this season. Understandably, they do not stay at the academy due to regular schooling on weekdays, entering it during weekends to have voice lessons from the Voice Mentors.

- Philip Cesar Nadela a.k.a. Philip Nolasco (9, from General Santos City)
  - Songs Performed
    1. Music and Me - Michael Jackson
    2. Sama na Kayo - Smokey Mountain
    3. Anak ng Pasig - Geneva Cruz
    4. Diana - Paul Anka
    5. We are the Champions - Queen
    6. Growing Up - Gary Valenciano
    7. Beat It - Michael Jackson
    8. Luha - Aegis
    9. How Could You Say You Love Me - Sarah Geronimo
    10. Thank You For The Music - ABBA
    11. Uptown Girl - Billy Joel - duet with Angelo
    12. You Raise Me Up - Josh Groban, Little Grand Star Dreamer - October 5, 2008
- Ana Mae "Amy" Libot a.k.a. Amy Nobleza (6, from Las Piñas)
  - Songs Performed
    1. Greatest Love of All - Whitney Houston
    2. Sabi Mo - Smokey Mountain
    3. Laguna - Sampaguita
    4. Diamonds Are Forever - Shirley Bassey
    5. One Moment in Time - Whitney Houston
    6. Someone's Waiting for You - Lea Salonga
    7. What's Love Got to Do with It - Tina Turner
    8. Halik - Aegis
    9. Saving All My Love For You - Whitney Houston
    10. I've Got The Music In Me - Kiki Dee
    11. One Night Only - from Dreamgirls - duet with Cristina
    12. Ako Ang Nasawi, Ako Ang Nagwagi - Dulce, Little Second Star Dreamer - October 5, 2008
- Allen Angelo Garcia (6, from Oriental Mindoro)
  - Songs Performed
    1. I Want to Break Free - Queen
    2. Da Coconut Nut - Smokey Mountain
    3. Heal the World - Michael Jackson
    4. (Oh,) Pretty Woman - Roy Orbison
    5. Eye of the Tiger - Survivor
    6. Awit ng Kabataan - Rivermaya
    7. Babaero - Randy Santiago
    8. Salamat - The Dawn
    9. Only You - Sam Milby
    10. Your Song - Elton John
    11. Uptown Girl - Billy Joel - duet with Philip
    12. Sweet Child O Mine - Guns N' Roses, Little Third Star Dreamer - October 5, 2008
- Aubrey Vallerie Caraan a.k.a. Aubrey Carreon (10, from Batangas)
  - Songs Performed
    1. The Voice Within - Christina Aguilera
    2. Can This be Love - Smokey Mountain
    3. Masdan Mo ang mga Bata- Asin
    4. Inseparable - Natalie Cole
    5. The Main Event - Barbra Streisand
    6. Big Girls Don't Cry - Fergie
    7. On My Own - Whitney Houston
    8. Nosi Balasi? - Sampaguita
    9. Wind Beneath My Wings - Bette Midler
    10. You Are My Song - Regine Velasquez
    11. Broken Vow - Lara Fabian - duet with Risie
    12. This Is My Now - Jordin Sparks, Top 4 Finalist - October 5, 2008
- Risie Joan Mayo a.k.a. Risie Joan (9, from Palawan)
  - Songs Performed
    1. Tuwing Umuulan - Regine Velasquez
    2. Kailan - Smokey Mountain
    3. Big Yellow Taxi - Joni Mitchell
    4. Smoke Gets in Your Eyes - The Platters
    5. Ever Since the World Began - Survivor
    6. Because of You - Kelly Clarkson
    7. Bituing Walang Ningning - Sharon Cuneta
    8. Tell Me Where It Hurts - MYMP
    9. On The Wings Of Love - Regine Velasquez
    10. A Song For You - The Carpenters
    11. Broken Vow - Lara Fabian - duet with Aubrey
    12. Narito Ako - Regine Velasquez, Top 5 Finalist - October 5, 2008
- Ma. Cristina Angela De Leon (9, from Cavite)
  - Songs Performed
    1. If We Hold on Together - Diana Ross
    2. Mama - Smokey Mountain
    3. Isang Mundo, Isang Awit - Leah Navarro
    4. This is My Life - Shirley Bassey
    5. I Believe I can Fly - Yolanda Adams
    6. Yesterday's Dream - Donna Cruz
    7. To Love You More - Celine Dion
    8. Hallelujah - Bamboo
    9. The Power Of Love - Celine Dion
    10. Dadaanin Ko Na Lang Sa Musika - 14K
    11. One Night Only - Beyoncé - duet with Amy
    12. May Bukas Pa - Rico J. Puno, Top 6 Finalist - October 5, 2008
- Jerome Ventinilla (7, from Marikina)
  - Songs Performed
    1. Paraiso - Smokey Mountain
    2. Nahan - Smokey Mountain
    3. The Animal Song - Savage Garden
    4. Sweet Caroline - Neil Diamond, Expelled - August 3, 2008
    5. Stand Up For Love - Destiny's Child, Back-to-School, Re-enrolled - August 31, 2008
    6. Makita Kang Muli - Sugarfree
    7. Pangako - Regine Velasquez
    8. I Write the Songs - Barry Manilow, Expelled - September 28, 2008
- Shania Shane Hermogenes (6, from Bulacan)
  - Songs Performed
    1. Fame - Irene Cara
    2. Best Friend - Smokey Mountain, Expelled - July 20, 2008
    3. It Can Only Get Better - Charice Pempengco, Back-to-School, Re-enrolled - August 31, 2008
    4. Sundo - Imago
    5. Ikaw - Regine Velasquez, Expelled - September 21, 2008
- Kelly Mercado (8, from Valenzuela City)
  - Songs Performed
    1. Hero - Mariah Carey
    2. Kahit Habang Buhay - Smokey Mountain
    3. Masdan mo ang Kapaligiran - Asin
    4. New York, New York - Liza Minnelli
    5. Looking Through the Eyes of Love - Melissa Manchester
    6. Pagdating ng Panahon - Aiza Seguerra
    7. Dreaming of You - Selena, Expelled - August 24, 2008
    8. My Heart Will Go On - Celine Dion, Back-to-School - August 31, 2008
- Dean Carlo Logo (7, from Laguna)
  - Songs Performed
    1. Complicated (Avril Lavigne song) - Avril Lavigne
    2. Street People - Smokey Mountain
    3. What a Wonderful World - Louis Armstrong
    4. Only You - The Platters
    5. Glory of Love - Peter Cetera
    6. Anak - Freddie Aguilar, Expelled - August 17, 2008
    7. Hataw Na - Gary Valenciano, Back-to-School - August 31, 2008
- Nikki Brianne Samonte (8, from Nueva Ecija)
  - Songs Performed
    1. I am But a Small Voice - Lea Salonga
    2. Ligaw Tingin - Smokey Mountain
    3. From a Distance - Bette Midler
    4. The Greatest Performance of My Life - Shirley Bassey
    5. This used to be My Playground - Madonna, Expelled - August 10, 2008
    6. Ngayon - Roselle Nava, Back-to-School - August 31, 2008
- Leon Matawaran (10, from Quezon City)
  - Songs Performed
    1. Tomorrow - Lea Salonga
    2. Better World - Smokey Mountain
    3. Bless the Beast and Children - The Carpenters, Expelled - July 27, 2008
    4. Fallin' - Teri DeSario, Back-to-School - August 31, 2008

== Weekly song themes ==
Each week, the scholars will sing songs that fit a specific weekly theme. The dates shown are the dates of the Gala Nights.

- Week 1 (July 13): None
- Week 2 (July 20): Smokey Mountain tribute
- Week 3 (July 27): Kalikasan (Nature)
- Week 4 (August 3): Oldies but Goodies
- Week 5 (August 10): Sports Themed Songs
- Week 6 (August 17): Growing Up Themed Songs
- Week 7 (August 24): Music Icons
- Week 8 (August 31): Back-to-School (Wildcard Round)
- Week 9 (September 7): Pinoy Rock
- Week 10 (September 21): Their Parents' Theme Song
- Week 11 (September 28): Songs that express their Passion for Singing

== Jurors ==
Resident Juror

- Jimmy Antiporda
- Aiza Seguerra - August 3, 2008 onwards

Guest Jurors

- Geneva Cruz - July 13, 2008
- Erik Santos - July 13, 2008
- Nina - July 20, 2008
- Jeffrey Hidalgo - July 20, 2008
- Rachel Alejandro - July 27, 2008
- Barbie Almalbis - July 27, 2008
- Richard Poon - August 3, 2008
- Dingdong Avanzado - August 10, 2008
- Jessa Zaragoza - August 17, 2008
- Wency Cornejo - August 31, 2008
- Mcoy Fundales - September 7, 2008
- Sheryl Cruz - September 21, 2008

== Expulsion nights elimination chart ==
In this part of the competition, the Little Dreamers also go through an elimination process where each week a scholar would be expelled from the academy. Due to the fact that they are children, grades are never stated. Instead a scholar who is the "Outstanding Little Dreamer" (counterpart of the Star Scholar) is picked out; sometimes two are picked out if they have the same grade on the judges' score cards. Two students are labeled "Needs Improvement" and therefore become probationary students, one of which would be expelled.

Class cards are distributed to the Little Dreamers prior to the start of their Friday class. The ones who get a "star" are safe from being a probationary student and the Little Dreamers who get the letters "N. I." (which stand for "Needs Improvement") are the probationary students and are subjected to viewers votes.

The process of elimination for this side competition is similar to the older scholars; however, the probationary students are revealed to the viewers at the beginning of the Gala Performance Night. Voting is opened at the start of the show and is closed at the end of the Gala Performance Night, when one of the Little Dreamers with "N.I." marks is expelled from the academy.

On the 7th Gala Night, it was announced that the next Gala Night will be the Back to School Round wherein the six expelled scholars will have the chance to return to the competition and once again battle it out for the title of Little Grand Star Dreamer.

| | 1st | 2nd | 3rd | 4th | 5th | 6th | 7th | 8th | 9th | 10th | 11th | Grand Dream Night | |
| | July 13 | July 20 | July 27 | Aug. 3 | Aug. 10 | Aug. 17 | Aug. 24 | Aug. 31 | Sept. 7 | Sept. 21 | Sept. 28 | Grand Dream Night | |
|---|---|---|---|---|---|---|---|---|---|---|---|---|---|
| Outstanding Little Dreamer | Angelo | Angelo; Philip | Cristina | Philip | Amy; Philip | Aubrey | Amy | - | - | Amy; Philip | - | - | |
| Philip | star | star | star | star | star | star | star | - | - | star | star | star | Winner |
| Amy | star | star | star | star | star | star | star | - | - | star | star | star | Second |
| Angelo | star | star | star | star | star | star | star | - | - | star | N. I. | star | Third |
| Aubrey | star | star | star | star | star | star | star | - | - | star | star | Finalist | |
| Risie | star | star | star | star | star | N. I. | star | - | - | star | star | Finalist | |
| Cristina | star | star | star | star | star | star | star | - | - | star | star | Finalist | |
| Jerome | star | star | N. I. | Expelled | | | | re-enter | - | N. I. | N. I. | Expelled | |
| Shane | N. I. | Expelled | | | | | | re-enter | - | N. I. | Expelled | | |
| Kelly | N. I. | N. I. | star | N. I. | N. I. | N. I. | Expelled | | | | | | |
| Dean | star | star | star | star | N. I. | Expelled | | | | | | | |
| Nikki | star | star | N. I. | N. I. | Expelled | | | | | | | | |
| Leon | star | N. I. | Expelled | | | | | | | | | | |
| Bottom Two Little Dreamers | Kelly; Shane | Kelly; Leon | Jerome; Nikki | Kelly; Nikki | Dean; Kelly | Kelly; Risie | none | none | none | Jerome; Shane | Angelo; Jerome | Open Voting | |
| Notes | none | none | none | none | none | none | none | Note 1 | Note 2 | none | Note 3 | none | |
| Viewers' Choice | Kelly; 53.96% | Kelly; 76.64% | Nikki; 50.03% | Kelly; 51.79% | Kelly; 57.66% | Risie; 58.38% | none | none | none | Jerome; 66.83% | Angelo; 88.30% | Angelo; 23.55% Amy; 22.45% Philip; 33.25% | PHILIP; 40.47% |
| Left the Academy | Shane; 46.04% | Leon; 23.36% | Jerome; 49.97% | Nikki; 48.21% | Dean; 42.34% | Kelly; 41.62% | none | none | none | Shane; 33.17% | Jerome; 11.70% | Aubrey; 10.76% Risie; 6.53% Cristina; 3.46% (out of 6) | Amy; 31.03% Angelo; 28.50% (out of 3) |

^Note 1 : In the Back-to-School Week, the Top 6 Little Dreamers didn't perform. The six expelled scholars performed on stage and the jurors graded them. Based on those grades, Shane and Jerome were given the chance to once again battle it out and be part of the Top 8.
^Note 2 : The Top 8 scholars performed and no expulsion took place. The following week had no Little Dreamers show to make way for the Grand Dream Nights of Pinoy Dream Academy Season 2.
^Note 3 : Due to having parotitis, Amy was unable to perform live, as prescribed by her doctor. However, the footage of her rehearsal with the live band was aired. Though she wasn't able to perform live, she is still a part of the Top 6 for being one of the Outstanding Little Dreamers last week along with Philip.
