= List of broadcasters owned by or affiliated with GMA Network =

This is a list of television and radio broadcasters owned by or affiliated with GMA Network. GMA Network Inc. owned-and-operated broadcast regional television and radio stations are being handled by the media company divisions. The following are television stations GMA Regional TV and radio stations RGMA (also known as Radio GMA).
