= AGB Nielsen Philippines =

Market research firm in the Philippines

- Type: Subsidiary
- Industry: Market Research
- Founded: 1992; 34 years ago (as Nielsen Media Research Philippines); 1999; 27 years ago (as Audits of Great Britain-Philippines); 2005; 21 years ago (merger)
- Headquarters: Wynsum Corporate Plaza, 22 F. Ortigas Jr. Road, Pasig City, Philippines
- Products: Market Research; Information; Consultancy
- Parent: Nielsen Holdings

AGB Nielsen Media Research Philippines, commonly called AGB Nielsen, or AGB Nielsen Philippines, or Nielsen Television Audience Measurement is the Filipino division of Nielsen, providing audience measurement, market research firms, and data analytics, with a focus on media in The Philippines. Nielsen conducts audience measurements for television ratings in more settled areas of the country, including rural and urban areas, specifically focusing on audience measurement in the country's most populated metropolitan area, Mega Manila.

As of 2023, AGB Nielsen Media Research Philippines has implemented surveys named Philippine National TV Audience Measurement (PHINTAM), National Urban Television Audience Measurement (NUTAM), and Rural TV Audience Measurement (RTAM).

In Mega Manila, Nielsen has a sample size of 1,190 homes versus Kantar Media’s 770 homes. Meanwhile, nationwide, Nielsen has a sample size of 2,000 homes compared to the lower sample size of 1,370 utilized by Kantar Media.

As of 2024, the main office of The Nielsen Holdings is headquartered in New York City, with global market research operations in over 100 countries while Kantar Media has offices in 90 markets, including the UK & Ireland, North America, India, Spain, France, Italy, China and Brazil and global headquarters of Kantar is located in London. Meanwhile, in the Philippines, the newest main office of AGB Nielsen Philippines' is located at 25/F Wynsum Corporate Plaza 22 F. Ortigas Jr. Road, Pasig City 1600.

== History ==
AGB Nielsen was created by the merger of the Audits of Great Britain-Philippines (established in 1999) and Nielsen Media Research (established in 1992) in 2005 as a subsidiary of AGB Nielsen Media Research, a joint venture formed by the AGB Group & the TAM business of The Nielsen Company in March 2005.

In October 2006, AGB Nielsen established the Philippines' first national television audience measurement panel called the "Nationwide Urban Television Audience Measurement (NUTAM)" that covered 95% of urban areas in the country. AGB Nielsen also conducts reports on three metropolitan cities called "Metro City TAM" (MCTAM) in addition to, Metro Manila, Cebu City and Davao City and Iloilo City.

On December 20, 2007, ABS-CBN Corporation filed a civil case against AGB Nielsen after ABS-CBN discovered tampering in ratings in Bacolod. The next day, ABS-CBN reported through their AM station DZMM that AGB Nielsen pointed GMA Network, Inc. was the one behind the manipulation of ratings in Bacolod. On January 3, 2008, GMA sued for P15 million ABS-CBN and some of its employees for libel. On January 8, Quezon City regional trial court nullified the lawsuit on a technicality of it being filed prematurely.

== Markets ==
Area	Population	% – urban
Metro Manila and suburbs	15.9 million	46%
Mega Manila	17.9 million	52%
MegaTAM markets*	13.2 million	38%
Balance-urban Philippines	16.5 million	48%
Urban Philippines	34.4 million	100%
Philippines	88.7 million	–
*Metro Manila, Iloilo City, Metro Cebu, and Metro Davao

AGB Nielsen market size
region	percent
MegaTAM	15%
Metro Manila	18%
Mega Manila	20%
Other urban	19%
Total urban	39%
Philippines	100%

According to their website, the largest television market in the country is the Mega Manila; in AGB-Nielsen's case, Mega Manila consists of Metro Manila, Bulacan, Rizal, Cavite and Laguna. Mega Manila is represented by 400 panel homes. Other areas are North and Central Luzon with 300 homes; South Luzon, 300 homes; Visayas, 300 homes; and Mindanao, 200 homes. These 1,500 panel homes comprise the National Urban Television Audience Measurement (NUTAM) and are scattered throughout the country. The NUTAM, does not comprise the entire Philippines, but only the urban centers. The survey encompasses 34 million individuals or 95% of urban Philippines, which comprises around 57 percent of the entire TV viewing population of the country.

== Classification ==
- Non-primetime: 5:00 a.m. to 5:30 p.m.
- Primetime: 5:30 p.m. to 5:00 a.m.

== Subscribers ==
AGB Nielsen's current international subscribers include GMA Network, SBS Korea, KBS Korea, MBC Korea, tvN, OCN, Mediacorp, ABC, CBS, NBC, Fox, Warner Bros. Discovery, Paramount, ebiquity, Faulkner, Dentsu Aegis Network, One 31 (Thailand), Workpoint TV, Channel 7 HD (Thailand), Channel 3 HD (Thailand), Posterscope, Group M, Zenith Opte media, Dentsu, Omnicom Media Group, Publicis, Starcom, Zenith, Apple TV, Meta Company, Nippon TV (NTV), Fuji TV, Ruku, Interpublic, BBC, Pinterest, Snapchat, Alibaba, Comscore, Chilevisión, América Televisión (Peru), Twitter,Instagram,Facebook,Google,YouTube,Telemundo Channels, Hulu,HBO,Amazon and Netflix.

FIFA has signed up with Nielsen to provide official market research for the 2017 FIFA Confederations Cup and the 2018 FIFA World Cup.

As of 2025, Nielsen TV Audience Measurement increased its client pool to a total of 44 clients/subscribers consisting of 13 local TV networks including A2Z, ALLTV, GMA Network, TV5, Cignal TV, One Sports, RPTV, Jeepney TV, Solar Entertainment, GTV, Kapamilya Channel, People's Television Network, Philippine Collective Media Corporation, DZMM TeleRadyo, PRTV Prime Media, The Beat Television Network Inc., and among others; 5 regional clients; 21 agencies (18 media agencies, 2 consulting agencies, 1 digital agency); and 1 advertiser.

== Spinoffs ==
Nielsen Philippines spin off its data and analytics branch Global Consumer Business as NielsenIQ in January 2021.

== New media ==
AGB Nielsen Philippines/NetRatings measures Internet and digital media audiences with telephone and Internet surveys. AGB Nielsen BuzzMetrics measures consumer-generated media. Other companies collecting information on Internet use include comScore, Wakoopa, and Hitwise, which measure hits on Internet pages. Visible Measures focuses on measuring online video consumption and distribution across all video advertising and content across Asian countries. GfK's Cross Media Measurement Solutions measures offline sales after TV, Internet, and mobile exposure.

== See also ==
- Nielsen Korea
- The Nielsen Company
- Nielsen Media Research
- Nielsen Holdings
- Nielsen Corporation
