= Pinoy Big Brother: Otso =

Season of Filipino television series

- Season 8
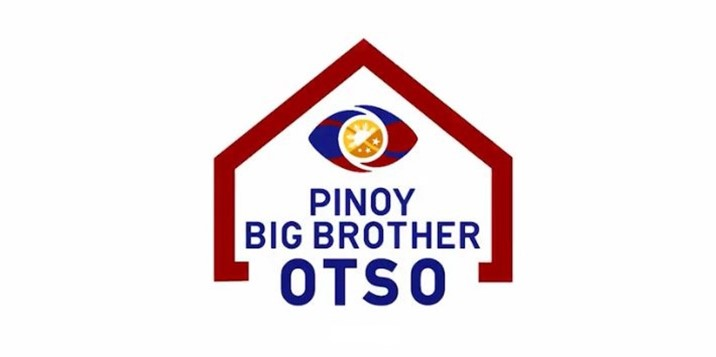
- Pinoy Big Brother: Otso logo
- Presented by: Toni Gonzaga; Robi Domingo; Alex Gonzaga; Kim Chiu; Melai Cantiveros; Bianca Gonzalez
- No. of days: 268
- No. of housemates: 58
- Winner: Yamyam Gucong
- Runner-up: Kiara Takahashi
- Companion shows: Pinoy Big Brother: Otso Gold; PBB Bring 8 On! (online)
- No. of episodes: 265

Release
- Original network: ABS-CBN
- Original release: November 10, 2018 – August 4, 2019

Season chronology
- ← Previous; Lucky Season 7 Next → Connect

The eighth season of the reality game show Pinoy Big Brother, subtitled Otso (transl. Eight), aired on ABS-CBN for 268 days from November 10, 2018, to August 4, 2019.

Four batches of housemates, two civilian adults and two teenager groups, compete to be the winner of their respective batches. By the fifth batch, all finalists from each batch return to compete for eight slots in the finale. The show concluded with Yamyam Gucong being declared as the winner of the whole season.

This was the longest season of Pinoy Big Brother yet, having reached 268 days—surpassing Lucky 7 by 235. This season is the third longest season of Big Brother worldwide and also had the second highest number of housemates in a season (58), trailing Big Brother Germany’s fifth and sixth seasons, which lasted for 365 and 363 days respectively, and had 59 housemates each.

== Development ==
=== Auditions ===
Auditions for this season has been part of Star Hunt: The Grand Kapamilya Auditions, ABS-CBN's auditions caravan, which started on April 20, 2018. 55,373 auditionees took part, auditioning for other upcoming reality shows like The Voice of the Philippines, Pilipinas Got Talent, and World of Dance Philippines. Several potential housemates have been featured in Star Hunt's companion show.

=== Other content ===
Pinoy Big Brother: Otso Gold returned as a companion show on November 12, 2018, as part of the Kapamilya Gold block. A house livestream also aired on iWant and TFC Online. An additional online companion show called PBB Bring 8 On!, which streamed simultaneously with the primetime TV program, also aired live via show's various social media accounts; it was hosted by Dawn Chang of Pinoy Big Brother: 737, Fifth Solomon of Pinoy Big Brother: All In, and Pamu Pamorada of Pinoy Big Brother: Unlimited.

An online show, YouthTube, which was hosted by Robi Domingo and Bianca Gonzales commenced on November 22, 2018. It talked about the different issues that arose in the house, particularly in the first batch of teen housemates.

== Overview ==
=== Logo change and subtitle ===
The Otso in the season title is a Filipino language rendering of the Spanish word ocho ("eight"), indicating the season number. This season saw another logo change from the previous season: an eye logo using motifs from the Philippine flag (from which producers customized the new generic eye logo of Big Brother), atop the show's title and enclosed by an outline of a house. The adaption of the new generic franchise logo is the first among all the franchises worldwide.

=== Timeslot ===
The weekday primetime program of the show aired at 10:00 p.m. on weekdays after the last primetime teleserye in the primetime program block of the network. An afternoon edition titled Pinoy Big Brother: Otso Gold aired at 5:15 p.m. after Los Bastardos.

The weekend primetime program was originally aired at 7:30 p.m. during the batch 1 teens; however, after the first season of I Can See Your Voice ended, Pinoy Big Brother: Otso moved its timeslot to 10:00 p.m. on Saturdays and 9:30 p.m. on Sundays in order to give the timeslot to World of Dance Philippines since the batch 2 adults.

=== House changes ===
The living room area of the Pinoy Big Brother House used for the Otso season. As shown, the one-way wall mirrors were removed and were replaced by robotic cameras as seen in the top left and top right sections of this photo. The furniture, however, was replaced during the middle of the season to accommodate the entry of the other batches.

This season showed a major revamp in the house layout. On September 7, 2018, Director Laurenti Dyogi made a vlog about the reconstruction of the house. The new house design was unveiled on November 7, 2018, during its house blessing. Several housemates from previous seasons have visited the house and have taken pictures for their social media accounts. Official house photos were released on their Facebook page on November 10, 2018. The management opened its doors to 888 visitors to tour the House for eight minutes on November 10, 2018.

From his livestream, Dyogi has stated that the show has upgraded to using HD PTZ cameras, making Otso the first season to fully broadcast in high definition and in 16:9 aspect ratio (Lucky 7's Vietnam leg was shown in 16:9, but the show reverted to 4:3 upon the housemates' return to the Philippines. The one-way mirror system, used in earlier seasons for cameramen to capture events in the house, was no longer present.

=== Hosts ===
Toni Gonzaga and Robi Domingo reprised their roles as hosts. Alex Gonzaga, who hosted All In, returned to the show together with former winners Kim Chiu and Melai Cantiveros as new hosts. Bianca Gonzalez reprised her role as host upon the entry of Batch 2 Star Dreamers.

=== Prizes ===
As revealed during the announcement of the batch winners, each batch winner will receive ₱100,000. On the other hand, the ultimate winner would take home ₱2,000,000 (₱1,000,000 from Miniso and ₱1,000,000 from the show), a condominium unit Suntrust Asmara from Suntrust Properties, Inc., a water refilling station business package worth ₱800,000, and a travel package worth ₱300,000 from Jag Jeans. The runner-up would receive ₱500,000 and a condominium unit from Suntrust Properties, Inc; the third and fourth placers would receive ₱300,000 and ₱200,000, respectively. ₱100,000 would be given to the fifth to eighth placers. Yen Quirante won a condominium unit from Suntrust Properties, Inc. during the third Pinoy Big Batch-Bakan.

== Format ==
Since its official announcement on October 20, 2018, much information about this season has not been made public until November 9, 2018, when Dyogi discussed its details on a livestream.

Four batches of housemates, civilians, and teenagers, came into the House in alternating order, starting with the teens. Each batch would comprise only eight official housemates. At the beginning of each batch's stay, 16 shortlisted contestants, known in the show as Star Dreamers, would take part in different tasks to determine who will be given housemate status, until eight are chosen. Star Dreamers who were unsuccessful in getting a spot in the House are sent to Camp Star Hunt, where they would be given tasks to determine among them the next person to be an official housemate. Every eviction, as one official housemate goes, a new one from the Camp takes their place. A new Star Dreamer will be introduced to the Camp, returning the number of housemates and Star Dreamers to eight. This is repeated for 6 weeks. By the seventh week, housemates would be participating in challenges or face the public vote, as part of the eviction process, until four are left. The public, then, decides, from the four, who they want to win for that batch. By the end of 8 weeks, the current batch leaves the House, and a batch winner is crowned, although the results were concealed until three more batches have gone through the same process. Once all batches are done, all batch winners would come back to the House, along with four more housemates from previous batches, chosen by the public, to form the final eight housemates who would battle to win the season.

This format was followed through on the batch 1. However, significant format changes were put in place as the show went on. By batch 2, Big Brother decided who would be an official housemate, and the housemates' stay was extended to 88 days—from the original 8 weeks or 56 days. By batch 3, all Star Dreamers eventually became housemates, entering the House by groups until Day 156. By batch 4, Camp Star Hunt was dropped, and the batch started with 12 official housemates, exiting the House via eviction without a replacement, and the housemates' stay was only 6 weeks—from the original 8 weeks or 56 days. By the Ultim8 Batch, all batch finalists returned, making the starting number of 16 housemates. The public did not decide who would return for this batch.

=== Twists ===
Aside from the twist to the show's format, the following are the highlighted twists that had occurred during the run of this season.

- Star Dreamers and Camp Star Hunt – On the launch night, 16 potential shortlisted contestants, called Star Dreamers, were introduced on the live launch wherein they must undergo through the housemate selection process twist in order to earn housemate status. Only eight of these Star Dreamers would become official housemates. Those who failed the cut, were housed in the Camp Star Hunt. These Star Dreamers would then battle between themselves by earning points in order to replace those housemates evicted weekly. The introduction of these Star Dreamers continued up to the third batch; upon the entry of the fourth batch, no more Star Dreamers were introduced.
- Housemates vs. Star Dreamers
- 2-in-1 Housemate – Two housemates who are related biologically are joined as one competing housemate, as assigned by Big Brother.

To disrupt normal selection processes in nominations, evictions, and even the finale to the determine the final four, Big Brother had given housemates several challenges of different formats for the five batches. For nominations and evictions, it had the Do-or-Die LigTask, The Duel, The Golden Circle and The Black Circle. For housemates to advance to the top group of any given batch, they had the Big Jump Challenge, Pinoy Big Batch-Bakan, and the Ultim8 Challenge.

=== Theme song ===
This season's theme song is "Otso Na" performed by co-hosts Toni and Alex Gonzaga where most elements (including the chorus) from Orange and Lemons's "Pinoy Ako," the franchise's theme song, were included in the song.

The season's eviction theme song was performed by Moira Dela Torre entitled "Before It Sinks In", written by herself and was part of her debut studio album Malaya.

== Housemates ==
On launch night on Days 1 and 2, official housemates were determined, from the chosen Star Dreamers from Star Hunt, through a series of challenges, by the council, and by the public. The council consists of past winners: Season 1's Nene Tamayo, Celebrity 1's Keanna Reeves, Celebrity 2's Ruben Gonzaga, Teen Edition Plus's Ejay Falcon, Teen Edition 4's Myrtle Sarrosa, All In's Daniel Matsunaga, 737's Jimboy Martin, and Lucky 7's Maymay Entrata. On Day 2, three winners from the council were replaced by three ex-housemates: All In's Loisa Andalio, 737's Barbie Imperial, and Lucky 7's Edward Barber. The public chose a housemate through voting; the one with the most votes will become a housemate.

Below is a table of official housemates, and a collapsed table for shortlisted Star Dreamers staying at Camp Star Hunt.

Name	Age on entry	Hometown	Original Batch					Ultim8 Batch			Refs.
Name	Age on entry	Hometown	Batch^{4}	Entered Camp	Entered House	Exited	Result	Entered	Exited	Result	Refs.
Ultim8 Batch
Yamyam Gucong	25	Bohol	Batch 2	Day 1	Day 3	Day 85^{2}	Batch winner	Day 2	Day 29	Winner	
Kiara Takahashi	21	La Union	Batch 4	No Camp	Day 2	Day 43^{3}	Batch winner	Day 1	Day 29	Runner-up	
Lou Yanong	21	Mandaluyong	Batch 2	Day 1	Day 3	Day 85^{2}	Batch finalist	Day 6	Day 29	3rd Place	
Andre Brouillette	21	Hawaii, USA	Batch 2	Day 1	Day 3	Day 85^{2}	Batch finalist	Day 4	Day 29	4th Place	
Fumiya Sankai	24	Japan	Batch 2	Day 1	Day 3	Day 85^{2}	Batch finalist	Day 1	Day 28	5th Place	
Lie Reposposa	15	Davao del Norte	Batch 1	did not enter	Day 2	Day 58^{2}	Batch winner	Day 3	Day 28	6th Place	
Ashley del Mundo	15	Australia	Batch 3	Day 8	Day 15	Day 57^{2}	Batch winner	Day 5	Day 28	7th Place	
Kaori Oinuma	18	Japan	Batch 1	did not enter	Day 2	Day 58^{2}	Batch finalist	Day 5	Day 28	8th Place	
Argel Saycon	20	Negros Oriental	Batch 4	No Camp	Day 1	Day 43^{3}	Batch finalist	Day 1	Day 21	Evicted	—
Wealand Ferrer	21	Nueva Ecija	Batch 4	No Camp	Day 1	Day 43^{3}	Batch finalist	Day 1	Day 21	Evicted	—
Akie Poblete	24	Italy	Batch 4	No Camp	Day 2	Day 43^{3}	Batch finalist	Day 1	Day 21	Evicted	—
Jelay Pilones	18	General Santos	Batch 1	did not enter	Day 2	Day 58^{2}	Batch finalist	Day 4	Day 21	Evicted	
Karina Bautista	16	Santiago City	Batch 1	did not enter	Day 2	Day 58^{2}	Batch finalist	Day 1	Day 21	Evicted	
Batit Espiritu	19	Nueva Ecija	Batch 3	Day 7	Day 15	Day 57^{2}	Batch finalist	Day 6	Day 21	Evicted	—
Tan Roncal	15	Davao City	Batch 3	did not enter	Day 8	Day 57^{2}	Batch finalist	Day 2	Day 21	Evicted	—
Yen Quirante	16	Camarines Sur	Batch 3	did not enter	Day 7	Day 57^{2}	Batch finalist	Day 3	Day 21	Evicted	—
Batch 4: Adults
Diana Mackey	21	Taguig	Batch 4	No Camp	Day 2	Day 42	Evicted				—
Franki Russell	24	New Zealand	Batch 4	No Camp	Day 1	Day 42	Evicted				—
Sky Quizon	21	Tarlac	Batch 4	No Camp	Day 1	Day 36	Evicted				
Gino Roque	23	Quezon City	Batch 4	No Camp	Day 2	Day 36	Evicted				
Hasna Cabral	30	Cavite	Batch 4	No Camp	Day 1	Day 29	Evicted				
Mae Alfante	22	Davao City	Batch 4	No Camp	Day 2	Day 21	Evicted				
Jamie Salenga	27	Quezon City	Batch 4	No Camp	Day 1	Day 15	Evicted				
Banjo Dangalan	27	Quezon City	Batch 4	No Camp	Day 2	Day 10	Forcibly Evicted				
Batch 3: Teens
Angela Tungol	17	Bataan	Batch 3	did not enter	Day 7	Day 55	Evicted				—
Lance Carr	18	Davao City	Batch 3	Day 8	Day 15	Day 55	Evicted				—
Sheena Catacutan	14	Santiago City	Batch 3	did not enter	Day 8	Day 53	Evicted				
Shoichi Oka	19	Japan	Batch 3	did not enter	Day 7	Day 53	Evicted				—
Mich Wunder	17	Leyte	Batch 3	did not enter	Day 7	Day 43	Evicted				—
Kyzha Villalino	16	Mandaue	Batch 3	did not enter	Day 8	Day 43	Evicted				
Emjay Savilla	16	Camarines Sur	Batch 3	Day 8	Day 14	Day 43	Forcibly Evicted				—
Jem Macatuno	18	Pampanga	Batch 3	Day 7	Day 14	Day 36	Evicted				—
Gwen Apuli	15	Albay	Batch 3	Day 8	Day 14	Day 36	Evicted				
Alfred Beruzil	19	Lucena	Batch 3	did not enter	Day 8	Day 36	Evicted				—
Shami Baltazar	15	Davao del Norte	Batch 3	Day 7	Day 14	Day 29	Evicted				
Narcy Esguerra	13	Laguna	Batch 3	Day 7	Day 15	Day 29	Evicted				
Batch 2: Adults
Shawntel Cruz	22	Baguio	Batch 2	Day 2	Day 55	Day 82	Evicted				—
Thea Rizaldo	22	Bohol	Batch 2	Day 2	Day 55	Day 82	Evicted				—
Camille Sandel	23	Pampanga	Batch 2	Day 41	Day 62	Day 78	Evicted				—
Kim Franco	23	Davao City	Batch 2	Day 34	Day 62	Day 78	Evicted				—
Hanie Jarrar	19	Isabela	Batch 2	Day 2	Day 57	Day 71	Evicted				
Mark Obera^{1}	34	Davao de Oro	Batch 2	Day 1	Day 13	Day 64	Evicted				
Mary Grace Lagos	28	Davao Occidental	Batch 2	Day 2	Day 36	Day 64	Evicted				—
JC Gamez	25	Italy	Batch 2	Day 2	Day 43	Day 57	Evicted				—
Wakim Regalado	19	Iloilo City	Batch 2	Day 2	Day 3	Day 50	Evicted				
Mitch Talao	29	Lucena	Batch 2	Day 1	Day 3	Day 50	Evicted				
Tori Garcia	24	Singapore	Batch 2	Day 2	Day 29	Day 43	Evicted				—
Apey Obera^{1}	22	General Santos	Batch 2	Day 1	Day 3	Day 36	Evicted				
Abi Kassem	20	Santiago City	Batch 2	Day 1	Day 3	Day 29	Evicted				
Batch 1: Teens
Seth Fedelin	16	Cavite	Batch 1	did not enter	Day 1	Day 57	Evicted				
Reign Parani	15	Canada	Batch 1	Day 16	Day 30	Day 57	Evicted				
Rhys Eugenio	17	Tarlac	Batch 1	Day 2	Day 16	Day 54	Evicted				
Missy Quino	17	Cebu	Batch 1	Day 2	Day 37	Day 51	Voluntarily Exited				
Ali Abinal	16	Las Piñas	Batch 1	Day 2	Day 23	Day 37	Evicted				
Aljon Mendoza	17	Pampanga	Batch 1	did not enter	Day 1	Day 30	Evicted				
Criza Taa	14	Quezon City	Batch 1	Day 2	Day 9	Day 23	Evicted				
Art Guma	17	Davao City	Batch 1	did not enter	Day 1	Day 16	Evicted				
Josh Worsley	13	Davao del Norte	Batch 1	did not enter	Day 1	Day 9	Evicted				

Notes

1. To reflect the actual numbering of days in the show and those posted in the show's social media accounts, the numbering of days is readjusted back to Day 1 upon the entry of a new batch.
2. On Day 13, with the result of Mark's crossover to the Big Brother House as an official housemate, Big Brother announced that he will become a 2-in-1 housemate with his sister, Apey. But on Day 27, after gaining the public's and the housemates' vote, the two eventually were separated as a 2-in-1 housemate.
3. denotes that Batch 1 Teens, Batch 2 Adults, and Batch 3 Teens did Temporary Exit until back to House on Day 1-6 of Ultim8 Batch
4. Day 43 denotes that Akie, Argel, Kiara, and Wealand did not exit the House on Day 43; however, the Batch winner was determined on that specific day.
5. The batch colors were officially introduced a few weeks before the determination of the Batch 4's Big 4.

Shortlist of Star Dreamers
Name	Age on entry	Hometown	Batch	Entered Camp	Exited Camp	Final Status	Refs
Grace Abrugar	23	Angeles City	Batch 2	Day 41	Day 83	House Challenger	—
Kin Franco	23	Davao City	Batch 2	Day 34	Day 83	House Challenger	—
Lyndon Oros	22	Quezon City	Batch 2	Day 48	Day 83	House Challenger	—
Mark McMahon	27	Surigao del Norte	Batch 2	Day 55	Day 83	House Challenger	—
Aljur Abrenica	28	Quezon City	Batch 2	Day 55	Day 68	Celebrity Star Player	
Patrick Bantecil	20	Cebu	Batch 2	Day 2	Day 41	Dismissed	—
Marie Songalia	23	Leyte	Batch 2	Day 13	Day 27	Dismissed	—
Gabby Sarmiento	18	Italy	Batch 1	Day 2	Day 51	Ultim8 House Player	—
Sansan Dagumampan	16	Iloilo City	Batch 1	Day 2	Day 55	Ultim8 House Player	—
Achilles Samain	18	Zamboanga City	Batch 1	Day 2	Day 56	House Player	—
Gian Wang	17	Cebu City	Batch 1	Day 23	Day 56	House Player	—
Krist Vertudez	15	South Cotabato	Batch 1	Day 2	Day 56	House Player	—
Kurt Gerona	18	Bohol	Batch 1	Day 9	Day 56	House Player	—
Lienel Navidad	16	Albay	Batch 1	Day 30	Day 56	House Player	—

== Housemate selection history ==
Note that the term crossover, as used in the show, meant that the Star Dreamer had officially been an official housemate. However, in the case of Kim and Camille of batch two, they were still considered Star Dreamers when they crossed over to the House on Day 62. They eventually became official housemates on Day 68 upon the outcome of Pinoy Big Battle. No cross-overs had happened after The Gr8 C from batch three as the Camp had been abandoned.

=== Batch 1: Teens ===
This is the list of 88-second challenges for the first batch of teen housemates:

- #1: Star Dreamers must throw two balls on a string on to three level bars. Each bar corresponds to 1 point, 2 points, and 3 points. Each stringed balls that hung on to a corresponding bar are points added to their score. The one with the most points wins.
- #2: Star Dreamers must pick balls, corresponding to their assigned color, from a pool to a container. Each ball is 1 point added to their score. If they put a colored ball that is different from their assigned color, 1 point will be deducted to their score. The one with the most points wins.
- #3: Star Dreamers must stack water-filled bottles. The one with the highest level wins.
- #4: Star Dreamers must transfer balls through a relay course by balancing them on a plate. A big ball counts as 2 points, and a small one counts as 1 point. The one with the most points wins.

Initial selection
	Day 1				Day 2			
	88 Second Challenge #1	88 Second Challenge #2	Vote of the Council #1	Public Voting #1	88 Second Challenge #3	88 Second Challenge #4	Vote of the Council #2	Public Voting #2
Participants	Achilles; Ali; Rhys; Seth	Aljon; Art; Gabby; Josh	Achilles; Ali; Art; Gabby; Josh; Rhys	Achilles; Ali; Gabby; Josh; Rhys	Jelay; Lie; Missy; Sansan	Criza; Kaori; Karina; Krist	Criza; Karina; Krist; Lie; Missy; Sansan	Criza; Karina; Krist; Missy; Sansan
Official Housemate(s)	Seth; 31 points	Aljon; ~~Gabby~~^{1} 15 points	Art	Josh; 36.59%	Jelay; ~~Missy~~^{2} 2 levels	Kaori; 12 points	Lie	Karina; 57.02%
References								

Notes

1. Aljon and Gabby tied in first place. To break the tie, they have to race to put one ball into their container.
2. Jelay and Missy tied in first place. To break the tie, they have to race to stack three water bottles without it being destroyed.

For Star Dreamers that didn't make the cut, they would be sent to the Camp. For them to crossover to the house, the team and individual scores of each will be added to determine their final points. The top four Star Dreamers with the most points will be up for public voting to determine who will become an official housemate. Once a Star Dreamer gets promoted as a housemate, another will come as their replacement.

- #1: Star Dreamers must prepare, and sell street foods for one hour. The team with the highest revenue gets higher points as a team. Individual points are also given based on their attitude and determination during the task.
- #2: Star Dreamers are tasked to create a fitness dance routine that will be taught to the public.
- #3: Star Dreamers must be able to buy junk materials with their given budget.
- #4: Star Dreamers are to create parols.
- #5: Star Dreamers are to write, act, and direct a short film, guided by Ces Quesada.

Batch 1 Camp Star Hunt selection
	#1		#2		#3	#4	Decemversus	Post-Crossover Phase		
	#1		#2		#3	#4	#5	#6	#7	#8
Entry Day and Date	Day 9 November 18		Day 16; November 25		Day 23; December 2	Day 30; December 9	Day 37; December 16	Day 44; December 23	Day 51; December 30	Day 54; January 3
Gabby	4	3	7	2	3	1	No score	House Player (Day 44)	Ultimate House Player (Day 51–57)	
Sansan	8	1	8	0	3	2	No score	House Player (Day 44)		Ultimate House Player (Day 55–57)
Achilles	8	4	8	0	0	1	No score	House Player (Day 44)		Exited (Day 56)
Aljon	Official Housemate (Day 1–30)					Evicted (Day 30)		House Player (Day 44)		Exited (Day 56)
Gian	Not in the Camp					2	No score	House Player (Day 44)		Exited (Day 56)
Krist	4	6	8	0	3	1	No score	House Player (Day 44)		Exited (Day 56)
Kurt	Not in the Camp		7	2	0	2	No score	House Player (Day 44)		Exited (Day 56)
Lienel	Not in the Camp						No score	House Player (Day 44)		Exited (Day 56)
Missy	8	5	7	2	0	1	No score	Crossed-over (Day 37–51)	Voluntary Exit (Day 51)	Exited (Day 56)
Rhys	4	7	7	2	Crossed-over (Day 16–54)					Exited (Day 56)
Reign	Not in the Camp				0	2	Crossed-over (Day 30–57)			Evicted (Day 57)
Ali	4	2	8	0	3	Crossed-over (Day 23–37)		Evicted (Day 37)		
Criza	8	8	Crossed-over (Day 9–23)			Evicted (Day 23)				
Participants	Achilles; Criza; Missy; Rhys		Kurt; Gabby; Missy; Rhys		Ali; Gabby; Krist; Sansan	Gian; Kurt; Reign; Sansan	All Star Dreamers	All Star Dreamers		
Not selected	Achilles; 10.31% Missy; 19.22% Rhys; 34.56%		Kurt; 8.35% Gabby; 12.33% Missy; 33.67%		Krist; 12.84% Sansan; 13.31% Gabby; 29.96%	Gian; 12.91% Sansan; 20.01% Kurt; 31.35%	Krist; 2.17% Gabby; 3.95% Achilles; 4.59% Sansan; 5.10% Gian; 5.77% Lienel; 5.84% Kurt; 35.10%	none	Achilles; Aljon; Gian; Krist; Kurt; Lienel; Sansan	Achilles; Aljon; Gian; Krist; Kurt; Lienel; Missy
Official Housemate(s)	Criza; 35.92%		Rhys; 45.65%		Ali; 52.98%	Reign; 35.72%	Missy; 37.49%	No selection		
House Player(s)	Not implemented							All Star Dreamers	Gabby	Sansan
References										

Ultimate House Player Nominations
	Ultimate House Player Nomination	Nominations received
Achilles	Gabby; Sansan	0
Aljon	Gabby; Lienel	3
Gabby	Sansan; Aljon	10
Gian	Gabby; Sansan	0
Krist	Gabby; Sansan	0
Kurt	Gabby; Sansan	2
Lienel	Kurt; Aljon	3
Sansan	Lienel; Aljon	6
Ultimate House Players	Gabby; Sansan	

=== Batch 2: Adults ===
On January 6 and 7, sixteen Star Dreamers entered the Camp, which was divided into Camp A and Camp B. They were divided into two groups, and had undergone the Ultimate Star Dreamer Challenge. After the challenge, Big Brother chose eight official housemates.

On this batch, Big Brother introduced the process of dismissal. A Star Dreamer would be up for dismissal if they belonged to the losing group of a challenge for three consecutive times. The other safe Star Dreamers would vote on who they want to stay in the Camp; the Star Dreamer with the fewest votes would be dismissed. On the fifth challenge, Patrick was the only one up for dismissal, so he was dismissed immediately, and no voting took place.

On Day 55, Shawntel and Thea crossed over to the Big Brother House as the official housemates; it was revealed that after this crossover, there will be no new additional Star Dreamers that would enter the Camp. Later on, Aljur Abrenica entered the Camp as a Celebrity Star Player.

On Day 62, evicted housemates Abi, JC, Tori, and Wakim entered the Camp to become House Challengers, together with the other Star Dreamers.

- #1: Star Dreamers are to form the provided illustration of a key by stacking crayons.
- #2: Star Dreamers are to run a carinderia and must sell their chosen dishes to the public. The team with the highest sales and with a point from the carinderia manager wins the task. Prior to the task, they must prepare and serve their dishes to the housemates for a taste test.
- #3: Star Dreamers are to do housekeeping in a hotel. The points they receive will be added to their next job which is to run a flower shop. This is for the wedding of Mitch and Dudz.
- #4: Star Dreamers are to run a free hair and make-up salon.
- #5: Star Dreamers are to become kiddie party entertainers.
- #6: Star Dreamers are to become wet market fish vendors.
- #7: Star Dreamers are to become water aerobics instructors.
- #8: Star Dreamers are to become cadets during the Military Training week against the Housemates for the 1st Ultim8 Pinoy Big Battle.

Batch 2 Camp Star Hunt selection
	Ultim8 Star Dreamer Challenge	#2	#3	#4	#5	#6	#7	Pinoy Big Battle	Post-Crossover Phase	
	#1	#2	#3	#4	#5	#6	#7	#8	#9	#10
Entry Day and Date	Day 1 January 8	Day 13 January 20	Day 27 February 3	Day 34 February 10	Day 41 February 17	Day 48 February 24	Day 55 March 3	Day 62 March 10	Day 62 March 12	Day 76 March 24
Dismissal Day and Date	—	—	Day 27; February 3	—	Day 41; February 17	—	—	—	—	—
Kin	Not in the Camp			Lost	Lost	Won	Won	Won	House Challenger; Fantastic Four (Day 63–83)	
Mark M.	Not in the Camp						Lost	Won	House Challenger; Fantastic Four (Day 63–83)	
JC	Won	Won	12	Lost	Won	Crossed-over (Day 41–55)		Evicted (Day 55)	House Challenger; Fantastic Four (Day 63–83)	
Wakim	Lost	Crossed-over (Day 1–48)					Evicted (Day 48)		House Challenger; Fantastic Four (Day 63–83)	
Grace	Not in the Camp					Won	Lost	Won	House Challenger (Day 63–83)	
Lyndon	Not in the Camp					Lost	Won	Won	House Challenger (Day 63–83)	
Abi	Lost	Crossed-over (Day 1–27)		Evicted (Day 27)					House Challenger (Day 63–83)	
Tori	Lost	Lost	12	Crossed-over (Day 27–41)		Evicted (Day 41)			House Challenger (Day 63–83)	
Shawntel	Won	Lost	12	Lost	Lost	Won	Won	Crossed-over (Day 55–82)		Evicted (Day 82)
Thea	Won	Lost	8	Won	Won	Lost	Won	Crossed-over (Day 55–82)		Evicted (Day 82)
Camille	Not in the Camp				Won	Lost	Lost	Won	Crossed-over (Day 62–78)	Evicted (Day 78)
Kim	Not in the Camp			Won	Won	Lost	Lost	Won	Crossed-over (Day 62–78)	Evicted (Day 78)
Hanie	Won	Won	16	Won	Lost	Won	Crossed-over (Day 48–69)		Evicted (Day 69)	Panelist (Day 77–78)
Mark O.	Lost	Won	Crossed-over (Day 13–62)						Evicted (Day 62)	Panelist (Day 77–78)
Mary Grace	Lost	Lost	16	Won	Crossed-over (Day 34–62)				Evicted (Day 62)	Panelist (Day 77–78)
Mitch	Lost	Crossed-over (Day 1–48)					Evicted (Day 48)			Panelist (Day 77–78)
Apey	Won	Crossed-over (Day 1–48)			Evicted (Day 34)					Panelist (Day 77–78)
Aljur	Not in the Camp							Star Player (Day 55)	Exited (Day 68)	
Patrick	Lost	Won	12	Lost	Lost	Dismissed (Day 41)				
Marie	Not in the Camp	Lost	8	Dismissed (Day 27)						
Andre	Lost	Crossed-over (Day 1–85)								
Fumiya	Won	Crossed-over (Day 1–85)								
Lou	Won	Crossed-over (Day 1–85)								
Yamyam	Won	Crossed-over (Day 1–85)								
Notes	^{See Note 1}	^{none}							^{See Note 2}	^{none}
Participants	All Star Dreamers	Hanie; JC; Mark O. Patrick	Hanie; JC; Mary Grace; Patrick; Shawntel; Tori	Hanie; Kim; Mary Grace; Thea	Camille; JC; Kim; Thea	Grace; Hanie; Kin; Shawntel	Kin; Lyndon; Shawntel; Thea	All Star Dreamers	All Star Dreamers	All Star Dreamers; Ex-Housemates
Not selected	Hanie; JC; Mark O. Mary Grace; Patrick; Shawntel; Thea; Tori	Hanie; JC; Patrick	Hanie; JC; Mary Grace; Patrick; Shawntel	Hanie; Kim; Thea	Camille; Kim; Thea	Grace; Kin; Shawntel	Kin; Lyndon	Grace; Kin; Lyndon; Mark M.	None	
Official Housemate(s)(s)	Abi; Andre; Apey; Fumiya; Lou; Mitch; Wakim; Yamyam	Mark O.	Tori	Mary Grace	JC	Hanie	Shawntel; Thea	Camille; Kim	No Selection	
Up For Dismissal	Not Implemented		Marie; Thea	Not Implemented	Patrick	Not Implemented				
Saved From Dismissal	Not Implemented		Thea; 4 of 6 votes to save	Not Implemented	None	Not Implemented				
Dismissed	Not Implemented		Marie; 2 of 6 votes to save	Not Implemented	Patrick	Not Implemented				

Notes

1. Colors indicate the division of Star Dreamers. The winning camp's advantage is that the first four housemates will come from their group. The other four housemates came from the losing camp.
2. Kim and Camille crossed over to the House on Day 62 but their status as Star Dreamers were still retained. They became official housemates on Day 68 upon the House winning the second Pinoy Big Battle.

Dismissal History
	#1	#2
Hanie	Thea	No voting
Thea	Nominated	No voting
Mary Grace	Marie	No voting
JC	Thea	No voting
Shawntel	Thea	No voting
Tori	Marie	No voting
Patrick	Thea	Nominated
Marie	Nominated	Dismissed (Day 27)
Up for Dismissal	Marie; Thea	Patrick
Dismissed	Marie; 2 of 6 votes to save	Patrick; Lost challenge
Saved	Thea; 4 of 6 votes to save	N/A

Fantastic Four Nominations
	Fantastic Four Nomination	Nominations received
Abi	Mark M. JC	1
Grace	Kin; Mark M.	0
JC	Tori; Wakim	9
Kin	JC; Wakim	5
Lyndon	JC; Wakim	1
Mark M.	JC; Kin	3
Tori	Kin; Lyndon	2
Wakim	JC; Abi	3
Fantastic Four	JC; Kin; Mark M. Wakim	

=== Batch 3: Teens ===
Camp Star Hunt selection
	Island Adventure		The Gr8 C			
	#1		#2			
Entry Day and Date	Day 7 April 6	Day 8 April 7	Day 14; April 13	Day 15; April 14		
Ashley	No score	No score	Lost	No score	Crossed-over (Day 15–57)	
Batit	No score	No score	Lost	No score	Crossed-over (Day 15–57)	
Tan	No score	No score	Crossed-over (Day 8–57)			
Yen	No score	Crossed-over (Day 7–57)				
Angela	No score	Crossed-over (Day 7–55)				Evicted (Day 55)
Lance	No score	No score	Lost	No score	Crossed-over (Day 15–55)	Evicted (Day 55)
Sheena	No score	No score	Crossed-over (Day 8–53)			Evicted (Day 53)
Shoichi	No score	Crossed-over (Day 7–53)				Evicted (Day 53)
Mich	No score	Crossed-over (Day 7–43)				Evicted (Day 43)
Kyzha	No score	No score	Crossed-over (Day 8–43)			Evicted (Day 43)
Emjay	No score	No score	Won	Crossed-over (Day 14–43)		Forced Eviction (Day 43)
Jem	No score	No score	Won	Crossed-over (Day 14–36)		Evicted (Day 36)
Gwen	No score	No score	Won	Crossed-over (Day 14–36)		Evicted (Day 36)
Alfred	No score	No score	Crossed-over (Day 8–36)			Evicted (Day 36)
Narcy	No score	No score	Lost	No score	Crossed-over (Day 15–29)	Evicted (Day 29)
Shami	No score	No score	Won	Crossed-over (Day 14–29)		Evicted (Day 29)
Notes	^{See Note 1}		^{none}	^{See Note 2}		
Participants	All Star Dreamers		Emjay; Gwen; Jem; Shami	Ashley; Batit; Lance; Narcy		
Not selected	Batit; Jem; Narcy; Shami	Ashley; Emjay; Gwen; Lance	none	none		
Official Housemate(s)	Angela; Mich; Shoichi; Yen	Alfred; Kyzha; Sheena; Tan	Emjay; Gwen; Jem; Shami	Ashley; Batit; Lance; Narcy		

Notes

1. The second batch of Teen Star Dreamers were introduced on March 31; but the set of official housemates were only introduced on April 7 and 8—Day 7 and 8, respectively.
2. These crossovers occurred on the same day, however it was broadcast on April 14 and 15. The housemates had to undergo a challenge in order to crossover the remaining Star Dreamers. Ashley and Batit crossed over during the Day 15 (April 14) episode, while Lance and Narcy crossed over during the Day 16 (April 15) episode.

== Houseguests ==
To reflect the numbering of days in the show and those posted their social media, the day counter is adjusted back to Day 1 upon the entry of a new batch.

For batch one:

- Day 8: Dawn Chang, Mickey Perz, and Zeus Collins, judged the housemates in their dance painting.
- Day 15: Axel Torres, Bayani Agbayani, Janella Salvador, and McCoy de Leon helped the housemates in their 1st Big Celebr8ty Challenge.
- Day 17: Canadian pop rock country band The Moffatts visited the House.
- Day 21: Nyoy Volante teach the housemates in their celebrity impersonations.
- Day 22: Billy Crawford, Jed Madela, and Melai Cantiveros judged their celebrity impersonation performances.
- Day 29: Elsa Droga, Juliana Parizcova Segovia and, Rufa Mae Quinto judged and assist the housemates in their 3rd Big Celebr8ty Challenge.
- Day 34: Loisa Andalio, encouraged the housemates to gain revenue in their fifth weekly task.
- Days 35 and 36, Edward Barber and Maymay Entrata visited the house. The two helped the housemates in their last Decem-versus challenge.
- Days 43 and 44: Darren Espanto, Jimboy Martin, Kyla, and Maris Racal judged the housemates' performances in their concert night.

For batch two:

- Day 11: ABS-CBN writer and stand-up comedian Alex Calleja entered the House in order to mentor them for their Otsoya Saya Task.
- Day 42: Liza Soberano and Enrique Gil entered the House to be guest directors for their acting task.
- Day 50: International pop band Now United visited the House.
- Day 55: Aljur Abrenica entered Camp Star Hunt to assist the Star Dreamers in Pinoy Big Battle.
- Day 65 until the end of the week: Ogie Alcasid entered the House and Camp to mentor the housemates and Star Dreamers for their foot puppet competition.

For batch three:

- Day 49, Andrea Brillantes, Francine Diaz, Kyle Echarri and Seth Fedelin entered the house to pretend as housemates and challenged the housemates to give up their golden medallions.

For batch four:

- Day 16, Vice Ganda entered the house to greet the housemates & interact with them.

== Weekly tasks ==
Task No.	Date given	Task title and description	Result
Batch 1: Teens
1	November 14 (Day 5)	88-Second Dance Painting; The Housemates must paint the Pinoy Big Brother: Otso logo through dance painting. The logo is divided into four quadrants, and housemates were paired to complete their assigned quadrant within 88 seconds. They must also perform and put the four quadrants together within 88 seconds. The housemates had four days to practice for their final performance at the end of the week. The best performing pair, chosen by the judges, would each receive ₱8,888 as well as immunity from the first nomination round regardless of the task's result.	Failed
2	November 21 (Day 12)	Tower of Dominoes; Housemates must create a tower of dominoes the shape of an 8 that is as high as the measuring stick provided. They must build this on a floating platform at the center of the pool.	Passed
3	November 29 (Day 21)	Gr8 to Imperson8; Housemates are given celebrity icons to impersonate, and must successfully act their impersonations on a live show. To succeed, they must receive 88,888 tweets through an official hashtag.	Passed
4	December 5 (Day 26)	Frisbee Relay; Housemates are given a frisbee with a cup attached, and three ping pong balls. All housemates must participate in the game, where one will throw the frisbee, one will try to shoot a ping pong ball inside the cup whilst in the air, and one who will catch it, with the ping pong ball inside the cup. All three ping pong balls must be used successfully.	Failed
5	December 11 (Day 32)	Pinoy Big Brotherhood Bazaar; Housemates are to sell 200 shirts worth ₱200,000. To succeed, they must sell all shirts that they themselves designed and priced, and be able to reach a revenue of ₱400,000.	Failed
6	December 18 (Day 39)	Big Otso Concert; Housemates must perform in a concert night, with the help of the Star Dreamers. They are divided into two teams. To succeed, all performances posted and uploaded from Facebook and YouTube must accumulate 888,888 views.	Passed
7	January 4 (Day 56)	Cube Tower of 2019; Housemates must build a cube that forms the number 2019. They must do this while blindfolded. While building the cube, there will be unexpected masked guests that will destroy the tower.	Failed
Batch 2: Adults
1	January 9 (Day 4)	Marie Songalia's Story; The male housemates were tasked to hide Marie in the House and the female housemates not to find her. Housemates, then, find her biological mother by doing eight laps in the pool, each, to get eight tokens per housemate and use them in the Otsonet machine to use social media to find her mother.	Passed
2	January 15 (Day 10)	Otsoya Saya Task; Housemates have to do a comedy show consisting of 8 sketches. To succeed, they must accumulate 88,000 laugh reactions from their Facebook video.	Passed
3	January 21 (Day 16)	A Quie8 House; While wearing head gears adorned with bells, the housemates are prohibited to speak and make noise on Big Brother's signal. They are only allowed to move and talk on Big Brother's command. They're only allowed to make five mistakes.	Failed
4	January 29 (Day 24)	Otso Card Cake; Housemates must create an eight-layered wedding cake made of cards. The first layer must occupy the full circumference of the circular table provided for them. Housemates have a wedding package that can be upgraded upon completing a number of cake layers; a three-layer cake will give them a standard package, a six-layer for a deluxe, and an eight-layer for a premium. In order to win the weekly task, they must successfully place the wedding topper at the top of the eight-layered wedding cake. The housemates are only given two days to finish the task.	Passed
5	February 5 (Day 31)	PBB Trashion Show; Housemates must create three different outfits using recyclable materials. They must sketch and create their own design based on the following categories: place of origin, summer wear, formal wear, and Philippine folklore. To win, they must model the designs properly and neatly on the runway at the end of the week.	Passed
6	February 12 (Day 38)	Fixing A Brok8n Heart; Housemates need to build a broken heart in the middle of the pool out of red styrofoam blocks scattered around the garden. Nobody is allowed to dip in the pool to support the structure, and the blocks should only be put together with the use of any material and any method they can come up with. Everyone must be in their cupid costumes while doing the task. To win, the fixed heart must erect for 88 seconds without anything or anyone supporting it.	Failed
7	February 18 (Day 44)	Dancem8s Ni Kuya; Housemates first nominate who are the least dependable in the House. This follows the normal nomination format, with the housemate giving 2 points and 1 point to their chosen nominees. The three highest pointers will become this week's task leaders. Housemates then picked blindly on which leader they will be assigned to.: Housemate / Points given / Points received; Andre / Wakim; Yamyam / 3; Fumiya / Wakim; Mary Grace / 1; Lou / Wakim; Mark / 2; Mark / Yamyam; Wakim / 1; Mary Grace / Lou; Andre / 2; Mitch / Yamyam; Fumiya / 1; Wakim / Andre; Mitch / 9; Yamyam / Wakim; Mary Grace / 5; For this weekly task, they must create a dance piece, to be scored by judges. The three groups were given a genre to base the piece on. To win the weekly task, their routines must include an aerial dance.: Teams / Members / Genre; Team Andre / Andre, Mark, Mary Grace / Femme; Team Wakim / Fumiya, Lou, Wakim / Hip hop; Team Yamyam / JC, Mitch, Yamyam / Lyrical; They were also given a special task, where they have to shoot billiard balls in their correct color holes in a tarpaulin. The group who finishes first gets an additional four points. The group with the most points from the weekly task will be immuned, while the other two will face eviction.: Teams / Score from the judges / / / / Additional points from the special task / Overall score; Teams / Judge Loisa / Judge AC / Judge Joane / Total / Additional points from the special task / Overall score; Team Wakim / 7 / 7 / 7 / 21 / — / 21; Team Yamyam / 7 / 7 / 6 / 20 / — / 20; Team Andre / 8 / 8 / 8 / 24 / 4 / 28	Passed
8	February 28 (Day 54)	Flipping Bottles; Housemates have to flip 88 bottles and make them stand on all four tables with 22 bottles per table.	Passed^{1}
9	March 7 (Day 61)	Military Week; The Pinoy Big Battle also served as their weekly task. For the result, see the first Pinoy Big Battle.	Failed
10	March 16 (Day 70)	Paa-pet Show; The Pinoy Big Battle also served as their weekly task. For the result, see the second Pinoy Big Battle.	Passed
Batch 3: Teens
1	April 10 (Day 11)	Dance Clash; Housemates choreograph three presentation numbers. The housemates will be divided into two groups of four. The first two numbers must include a story. An additional challenge was given on Day 12 wherein at the instance of Big Brother, a certain number of housemates will have to practice their choreography lying down. They will have to be in the said position until Big Brother says otherwise.	Passed
2	April 16 (Day 17)	Al-EGG-aan mo ako Housemates are given one egg to be designed and taken care of in preparation for Easter Sunday. It must not be broken and it must be tied to their pulse until Big Brother tells them to release it. To win, they must not break more than four eggs.	Failed
3	April 25 (Day 26)	Pinoy Pig Houses; Housemates must create houses based on various materials given by Big Brother. When they're done, the Big Bad Wolf will enter to test the sturdiness of the houses by wind and water. To win, 2 out of 3 houses must remain intact.	Failed
4	April 30 (Day 31)	Sports Fest; Housemates are divided into their genders for the two games to be played by the end of the week, which are basketball for the boys, and volleyball for the girls. They will duel with the ex-housemates for all games. Each game is equivalent to 50% of their weekly budget, and they must win both to get their weekly budget in full. Passing means at least one game was won.	Passed^{2}
5	May 6–9 (Day 37–40)	Pinoy Big Bakbakan; Housemates face with the batch two finalists in a series of four challenges to get a fourth of their weekly budget. Passing this task means they have to win 3 out of 4 challenges.: Game / Housemates / Challengers / Winner; Game #1 / Kyzha and Sheena / Fumiya and Yamyam / Housemates; Kyzha and Sheena; Game #2 / Angela and Lance / Lou and Andre / Challengers; Lou and Andre; Game #3 / Shoichi and Yen / Fumiya and Yamyam / Challengers; Fumiya and Yamyam; Game #4 / Ashley and Tan / Lou and Andre / Challengers; Lou and Andre	Failed^{3}
6	May 15 (Day 46)	Build 8 Up; Housemates must build a tower with eight layers made of plastic cups. To win, they must fill all cups with water by only filling the topmost cup. Additional layers would be added for each game lost during the second Pinoy Big Bakbakan; a layer would also be deducted for each game won.	Failed
Batch 4: Adults
1	May 29 (Day 4)	80,000 Seconds of Sleep; The Housemates must not exceed 80,000 seconds of sleep for the rest of the week. The time begins to decrease as soon as one housemate closes their eyes. To win, there must still be time left at the conclusion of the task.	Passed
2	June 6 (Day 12)	Jump Rope Exchange 8 Housemates divide themselves into two groups. Each group delegates two members who will hold the jump ropes, while four members will be the jumpers to simultaneously jump in the jumping rope. There will be two seasons that will be experienced by each group: sunny and rainy seasons, each season having a specific outfit. The jumpers must exchange outfits while continuously jumping inside the jumping rope. Each group succeeding is equivalent to 50% of their weekly budget. To win, housemates must not exceed four mistakes at the end of their performance.	Passed^{4}
3	June 13 (Day 19)	8 to 8.8 Kilo Weight Loss; Housemates were weighed accordingly at the start of the task. To win, the group's weight loss must not fall outside the 8.0 to 8.8 kilo weight loss range.	Failed
4	June 19 (Day 24)	Tower Blocks; Housemates were divided into three groups: Team Kiara, Team Argel, and Team Gino. All teams were required to gather Jenga blocks placed at the other side of the pool without swimming across or going around the pool. The Jenga blocks were then used to build three 8-or-more-feet tower blocks built by each team. To win, all three tower blocks must not be destroyed. As part of the weekly nominations, if any of the teams fail to build their tower blocks and guard them from being tumbled down from any cause, the two teams with the tower blocks of the least height will be automatically nominated.	Failed
5	June 26 (Day 31)	Balloon Task; Housemates take care of the balloons they got from the garden. Each housemate must get hold of at least one balloon. The moment a balloon reaches the ceiling or falls to the ground, that balloon would be captured. To win, the housemates must have one balloon each at the end of the week.	Failed
Ultim8 Batch
1	July 8 (Day 2)	Pinoy Big Pebble Mural; Using thousands of pebbles, housemates must create a mural wall that will depict the camaraderie of the four batch of housemates together as one batch.	Passed

Notes

1. This task was a partial failure, as the housemates didn't meet the task's requirements but Big Brother considered this task a pass.
2. Housemates only won one of the two games, basketball; hence, they only received half of their weekly budget.
3. Housemates only won one of the four games, Catch and Build; hence, they only received one-fourth of their weekly budget.
4. Housemates only won one of the performances, with Team Mae; hence, they only received half of their weekly budget.

== Challenges ==
=== Big Celebr8ty Challenge ===
In the first batch, the Ligtask was brought back in the form of the Big Celebr8ty Challenge. Every Saturday, the housemates would compete in a for immunity from nominations; there will be celebrity guests that would be participating for certain roles in the challenge. For the first week, Bayani Agbayani, Axel Torres from All In, Janella Salvador and McCoy de Leon from Lucky 7 took part in the challenge. For the second week of the challenge, Nyoy Volante, Melai Cantiveros, Billy Crawford and Jed Madela judged the teen housemates' performance. For the third week of the challenge, Rufa Mae Quinto, and Elsa Droga and Juliana Pariscova Segovia of It's Showtime took part as actors for the said challenge.

Challenge No.	Challenge date	Challenge title and description	Participants	Winner
1	November 24 (Day 15)	Hatak Attack! Grouped in pairs, the housemates must be able to pull the tablecloth swiftly while attempting to keep all the items on the table stand. Each item corresponds to 1 point. Whichever pair gains the lowest points gets eliminated in each round. In all three rounds, there will be various skits involved, featuring guest celebrities.	Aljon & Lie; Kaori & Karina; Art & Jelay; Criza & Seth	Aljon & Lie
2	December 1 (Day 23)	Gr8 to Imperson8; Housemates were transformed as Filipino music icons. The housemates must transform and be able to impersonate the Filipino music icon given to them in a live show lip-sync performance. The performance will be judged by a panel of celebrities. The two housemates with the highest accumulated scores would be immune from the week's nomination. This also served as the housemates' weekly task.	All Housemates	Jelay (1st place); Lie (2nd place)
3	December 8 (Day 29)	Jungle Bells; In a jungle called Jungle Bells, there are four boxes filled with a set of animals each. Each box has a corresponding empty box found at the other side of the activity area. In pairs, the housemates must transfer each of the animals in the corresponding empty boxes. After transferring they must count the animals inside each four boxes and use those numbers to correctly answer a math equation. The equation goes Frog x Chicken ÷ Lizard + Eel - Snake. The correct solution must be "10 x 9 ÷ 15 + 5 - 2" while the correct answer must be "9". The two pairs who had solved the correct answer the fastest would be safe while the losing pairs would be nominated for eviction.	Ali & Rhys; Karina & Jelay; Lie & Seth; Kaori & Juliana^{1}	Lie & Seth; Ali & Rhys

Note

1. Kaori was paired with Juliana after Aljon was disqualified to join due to his automatic nomination for numerous violations.

=== Housemates vs. Star Dreamers ===
Batch one participated in Decem-versus, and the mechanics are as follows: there are three challenges they have to go through, and the teams must race to win two out of three. If the housemates got defeated by Camp Star Hunt, there would be a double eviction and two Star Dreamers would crossover. If the housemates win, no double eviction will happen. On Day 33, Ali, Reign, and Rhys, who are originally from Camp Star Hunt, took the chance to help the Camp, leaving the five other housemates to compete in the second challenge. On Day 34, after the housemates lose their second challenge, the Camp had an 88-second advantage on their third challenge. On Day 36, Ali, Reign, and Rhys were given a chance to change their decision. Rhys was the only one who returned help the housemates. Edward Barber and Maymay Entrata entered the House to help the housemates. While the Camp won two out of three, the housemates were declared winners of Decem-versus, and no double eviction happened. The reason for this decision is unknown.

Batch two participated in Pinoy Big Battle. If the housemates win, all of them will be immune from eviction; otherwise, two Star Dreamers will crossover. Prior to the announcement of the first battle, Big Brother informed Shawntel and Thea that they will be separated during the final battle: one would stay with the housemates, and the other would be sent to help the Star Dreamers. The housemates, then, chose Shawntel to help the Star Dreamers. For the second battle on Day 68, Camille and Kim learned that they weren't officially housemates yet, and would only become one after the battle. They were tasked to lead the Housemates for the second battle, while Shawntel and Andre were sent to Camp Star Hunt to lead them respectively. Grace and Kin replaced them for the battle.

Challenge No.	Date given	Challenge description	Team Housemates Participants	Camp Star Hunt Participants	Winner
Decem-versus (Batch One)
1	December 11 (Day 32)	Big Circle Dance; Housemates and Star Dreamers must fit their feet inside eight circles with varying sizes. They are timed on how long they manage to do this in every circle. Their seconds for every circle are added to reach a total time. The team with the shortest time wins.	Ali, Jelay, Kaori, Karina, Lie, Reign, Rhys, Seth	Achilles, Gabby, Gian, Krist, Kurt, Lienel, Missy, Sansan	Camp Star Hunt; 3 minutes, 59 seconds
2	December 13 (Day 34)	Human Slingshot; Housemates and Star Dreamers are to create a human slingshot and must pin down targets placed on top of the roof of the House using basketballs. The team with the most points wins.	Jelay, Kaori, Karina, Lie, Seth	Achilles, Ali, Gabby, Gian, Krist, Kurt, Lienel, Missy, Reign, Rhys, Sansan	Camp Star Hunt; 2 points
3	December 15 (Day 36)	This challenge is in two parts: Wooden Plank Relay; On the first round, housemates and Star Dreamers are to move balls using wooden planks, in which they must balance to shoot onto a box. Hole in the Wall Maze; For the second round, the balls should be put on top within a maze board, full of varying sizes of holes with the use of a pulley machine. The team with the lowest total time wins.	Edward, Jelay, Kaori, Karina, Lie, Maymay, Rhys, Seth	Achilles, Ali, Gabby, Gian, Krist, Kurt, Lienel, Missy, Reign, Sansan	Housemates; 23 minutes, 35 seconds
Pinoy Big Battle (Batch Two)
1	March 7 (Day 61)	Housemates and Star Dreamers were sent to Camp Capinpin in Tanay, Rizal. Big Brother temporarily got the flags of both teams from them and they can get it back once they finish the challenges in all eight stations. The first squad to make it to the grandstand wins.	Andre, Fumiya, Hanie, Lou, Mark O., Mary Grace, Thea, Yamyam	Aljur, Camille, Grace, Kim, Kin, Lyndon, Mark M., Shawntel	Camp Star Hunt
2	March 14 (Day 68)	Housemates and Star Dreamers compete onstage in three rounds of performances. On the first round, the two teams will perform against each other in a clash of Chinese Yoyo skills. They will then compete in another Chinese Yoyo battle in the second round. In the last round, both teams should be able to showcase their Paa-pet Show.	Camille, Fumiya, Grace, Hanie, Kim, Kin, Lou, Thea, Yamyam	Abi, Andre, JC, Lyndon, Mark M., Shawntel, Tori, Wakim	Housemates

=== Big Jump ===
Housemates participate in various challenges to be a batch finalist. On Day 50 of batch one, Big Brother announced that one of the Star Dreamers can help one of the participants. They pick Jelay, and Gian was able to help her in the challenge. On Day 31 of batch four, for the first four challenges, two housemates participate on each.

Challenge No.	Date given	Challenge title and description	Participants	Winner
Batch One
1	December 28 (Day 49)	Big Pole Balance; Participants must balance a billiard cue ball on a platform with a pole attached, while moving it on a circuit maze. They must do this within an allotted time limit. If the ball either drops or passes the border, the participant has to restart.	Jelay; Kaori; Lie; Reign	Jelay
2	January 3 (Day 55)	Last Doll Standing; Participants must balance a platform attached to a pole with a doll above it. The last housemate standing wins.	Kaori; Karina; Lie; Reign; Seth	Kaori
Batch Two
1	March 17–19 (Day 71–73)	Destruct and Stack; Housemates were pitted against House Challengers in pairs. They have to topple down a wall of colorful blocks by hitting it with balls then reassemble those afterwards forming the pattern on the opposite side of it. Both pairs have a Freeze power to stop their opponents from finishing their blocks and attempting to destroy what they had already constructed. If a housemate pair wins, both of them will proceed to the next round; otherwise, the housemate pair would have to decide which of them will proceed to the next round and which of them will be automatically nominated.: Housemates Pair / House Challengers Pair / Winner / Nominated; Andre and Lou / Kin and Mark M. / Housemates; Andre and Lou / None; Fumiya and Yamyam / JC and Tori / House Challengers; JC and Tori / Fumiya; Camille and Shawntel / Grace and Lyndon / Housemates; Camille and Shawntel / None; Kim and Thea / Abi and Wakim / Housemates; Kim and Thea / None	All Housemates	Andre; Camille; Kim; Lou; Shawntel; Thea; Yamyam
2	March 22 (Day 76)	Block Tower; Housemates must demolish a block tower on a platform with their family photo on top using only their feet. They must rebuild the block tower on a separate platform, also by using their own feet. The three housemates who rebuild the tower the fastest will move on to the final round.: Housemate / Time; Yamyam / 9 minutes, 13 seconds; Lou / 10 minutes, 38 seconds; Andre / 14 minutes, 42 seconds; Thea / 14 minutes, 50 seconds; Kim / 19 minutes, 56 seconds; Shawntel / 20 minutes, 6 seconds; Camille / 28 minutes, 19 seconds	Andre; Camille; Kim; Lou; Shawntel; Thea; Yamyam	Yamyam; 9 minutes, 13 seconds Lou; 10 minutes, 38 seconds Andre; 14 minutes, 42 seconds
3	March 23 (Day 77)	The Boat is Sinking; Housemates who are not competing in the final round will choose one of the three participants to assist. Before the challenge, they must collect and assemble cups and containers that they will use in the challenge. Participants must bail water out of a boat with holes using the containers they've collected. When the buzzer sounds, they must start bailing water for 88 seconds. At set intervals, more holes are introduced via corkholes in the boat, and weights are placed into the boat. Eventually, the participants must ditch their containers and only use their hands, and then only use one hand. When a participant's boat is fully submerged at any point, they are eliminated. The last participant standing becomes a batch finalist.	Andre; Lou; Yamyam	Yamyam
Batch Three
1	May 18 (Day 49)	Unscramble 8 Participants must arrange a set of letters and come up with the passphrase "PANGARAP LAGING ILABAN." The housemates who successfully unscrambled the phrase would move on to the next round.	Angela; Ashley; Batit; Lance; Sheena; Tan	Batit; Lance; Tan
2	May 18 (Day 49)	Unlock 8, Balance 8, Stack 8, and Lock 8 Participants need to balance their completed passphrases by unlocking the mechanism and balancing the block of letters on top of it. After they put all the block of letters, they have to lock again the mechanism. If the block of letters fall on the ground, they would have to start all over again. The first participant to finish becomes a batch finalist.	Batit; Lance; Tan	Batit
3	May 23 (Day 54)	Flipping Bottles; There is a set of rings that participants have to shoot in the peg in 88 seconds in order to have an advantage. If a housemate shoots two rings, the tower they'll uson which the bottles are to be flipped on would only be 8 feet; if one ring, their tower would be 10 feet, and if none, their tower would be 12 feet. The four participants who finish in the least amount of time would move on to the next round.: Housemate / No. of rings shoot / Height of tower / Time; Ashley / None / 12 ft / 21 seconds; Yen / 2 / 8 ft / 1 minute, 28 seconds; Tan / 2 / 8 ft / 3 minutes, 57 seconds; Lance / 2 / 8 ft / 4 minutes, 29 seconds; Angela / 1 / 10 ft / 8 minutes, 52 seconds	Angela; Ashley; Lance; Tan; Yen	Ashley; 21 seconds Yen; 1 minute, 28 seconds Tan; 3 minutes, 57 seconds Lance; 4 minutes, 29 seconds
4	May 23 (Day 54)	Collect the Balls; Participants have their own boxes which they should fill in with balls from other housemates' box. They only have to get one ball at a time. The housemate to fill in the box with the most balls by the end of 88 minutes will be a batch finalist.	Ashley; Lance; Tan; Yen	Tan
Batch Four
1	June 25 (Day 31)	Paper Plate Relay; Participants must balance the paper plates on top of sticks on the table. There are colored paper plates assigned for each participant: black and white. Participants must remove the paper plates balanced by the opponent and change it with their paper plates. The participants with the ost paper plates balanced after 88 minutes would advance, and the loser would be automatically nominated.	Akie; Franki	Akie; 35 paper plates to Franki's 34
2	June 26 (Day 32)	Spinning Top Relay; Participants must be able to transport a spinning top while balancing it through an obstacle table shaped number eight from the starting point up to the box at the end of the table. In case the top stops spinning or it falls down to the ground, they have to get the top back to starting point. The participant with the most tops in their box after 88 minutes would advance, and the loser would be automatically nominated.	Argel; Wealand	Argel; 35 tops to Wealand's 17
3	June 27 (Day 33)	White Feather, Black Feather; Big Brother had the chosen remaining housemate, Diana, pick randomly who she's going to be up against. For their challenge, participants have the same number of silver balloons that they need to pop by throwing them up the ceiling with nails sticking out. Once they popped a balloon, they have to catch the black or white feathers stored inside it. The players cannot pick up the feathers that already fell to the ground. Every white feather collected by a player is equivalent to a point added to them while every black feather collected is equivalent to a point deducted from their opponent if they choose to put it in the opponent's container. The housemate with most points at the end of 88 minutes would advance, and the loser would be automatically nominated.	Diana; Gino	Gino; 361 points to Diana's 347
4	June 28 (Day 34)	Hockey Puck Relay; Participants have to slide pucks, using an elastic band attached to the table, to their opponent's side. Once a participant got all their pucks to their opponent's side, they'd earn a point. After 88 minutes, the one with the most points would advance, while the loser would be automatically nominated.	Kiara; Sky	Kiara; 37 points to Sky's 20
5	June 29 (Day 35)	Picture Puzzle, Cross the Narrow Beam; Participants have flags, and are given a cycle for their flags to rise: they must solve a picture puzzle, proceed to the task room where they must carry a weight across a narrow balance beam. After they have completed this cycle, they'd raise their flag by one level. They have to do this until they're flags have completely risen. The first participant to raise their flag becomes a batch finalist.	Akie; Argel; Gino; Kiara	Akie
6	July 2 (Day 38)	Pebble Problem; Participants must count through thousands of pebbles and guess the correct count of 38,819 pebbles within 48 hours. The participant with the closest guess would receive an advantage in the next round.: Housemate / Guess / Difference; Kiara / 38,818 / 1 under; Diana / 38,826 / 7 over; Argel / 38,808 / 11 under; Wealand / 38,840 / 21 over; Franki / 38,100 / 719 under	Argel; Diana; Franki; Kiara; Wealand	Kiara; 1 pebble under
7	July 3 (Day 37)	The Hanging Otso Platform; This challenge was split into two parts. Participants must maneuver a ball through a wire-like maze. For winning the prior round, Kiara got a 30-minute head-start in the challenge. Every housemate would start 30 minutes later than the previous housemate depending on their placement in the previous round. After 26 hours, the housemates moved on to the second part. They would have to balance a separate set of balls from one side of the activity area to another using their pole without the rubber edges. The housemate with the most balls from the two parts would become a batch finalist.	Argel; Diana; Franki; Kiara; Wealand	Wealand; 121 balls

=== Do-or-Die LigTask ===
As Karina, Rhys, and Seth forfeited their chance in the Big Jump, Big Brother made them participate in a Do-or-Die Ligtask. If all of them succeeded the challenge happening on Day 53, they will be safe from eviction; otherwise, one of them will get evicted.

Challenge No.	Date given	Task description	Participants	Result
Batch One
1	January 2 (Day 54)	Water Tower; Participants must relay through tires to get water from a pool using only a tablespoon. They must then retreat to put water in their designated tower. After the tower fills and the balloon gets popped, they must retrieve a password to open a safe, which contains the next challenge. Tangram Puzzle; Participants must assemble a tangram with a figure of an 8 serving as their guide. To succeed, they must call Big Brother to inspect the tangram they assembled.	Karina; Rhys; Seth	Rhys

=== The Duel ===
For batch two, housemates had to challenge another housemate to determine the duel participants. The winner of the duel would be safe, while the loser would be fake evicted from the House, be moved to a secret room in the House, and be nominated for eviction for that week.

Challenge No.	Date given	Duel description	Challenger	Challenged
Batch Two
1	February 25 (Day 51)	Cue Ball Relay; Participants have to transfer three cue balls one-by-one into an elevated container by transporting it into a transparent tube that could only be raised by pulling the strings attached to it with the use of their feet. The quickest one to accomplish it would be the winner.	Yamyam; 36 minutes, 3 seconds	Mark O. 14 minutes, 47 seconds
2	February 26 (Day 52)	Water Tower; Participants have to fill up a water tower by pouring colored water to it that they need to fetch from three different containers using the glass assigned to each one of those. They must slide it across the table and exactly reach the green marker before they could transfer its contents to the tower. The first one to fill the water tower up to the brim will be the winner.	JC; 16 minutes, 15 seconds	Hanie; 15 minutes, 34 seconds
3	February 27 (Day 53)	Weigh 8 Right; Participants have to exactly weigh eight kinds of items. They have to, separately, place each kind of items in eight containers and weigh them exactly in the required weight set for each item. If needed, they may cut, saw, break, or remove any part of the item in order to attain the required weight. The participant with the fastest time to weigh all items perfectly will be the winner.	Mary Grace; 29 minutes, 21 seconds	Lou; 41 minutes, 2 seconds
4	February 27 (Day 53)	Block Stacking; Participants will have an unbalanced table. On top of it are blocks formed and stacked like the Big Brother House. They need to maintain the table's balance using a rope while retrieving, separately, a set of eight blocks placed on the left side of their area. On the farthest end is a table where they will have to place the blocks they had retrieved and stack them similar to that in the unbalanced table. If the blocks in the unbalanced table falls, they will have to restack them again in the correct pattern and repeat the challenge. The first to stack the eight blocks in the correct pattern will be the winner.	Andre	Fumiya

=== Pinoy Big Bakbakan ===
For batch three's fourth and fifth weekly task, the housemates compete with the batch finalists of batches one and two. The challenges were played in pairs.

Game No.	Date given	Game description	Housemates	Challengers
Fourth Weekly Task
1	May 6 (Day 37)	Catch and Build; One housemate would have to stand on a vibrating exercise machine while catching the balls thrown backwards by their partner from eight different places by using only one hand. Then, they must alternately build cubes and discs consecutively on a stick. The pair to finish the game with the least time wins.	Kyzha and Sheena; 6 minutes, 41 seconds	Fumiya and Yamyam; 12 minutes, 5 seconds
2	May 7 (Day 38)	Direct Me to the Key; One housemate is trapped on a watch tower while giving instructions to their partner to go across a string-laced maze to get a key; their partner would have to do this blindfolded. If their partner touches the string, there would be a time penalty of 8 seconds. Once their partner gets the key, they had to go back to the watch tower to rescue the housemate. The pair to complete the game with the least time wins.	Angela and Lance; 16 minutes, 29 seconds	Lou and Andre; 16 minutes, 24 seconds
3	May 8 (Day 39)	Human Slingshot; One housemate would aim for the target while their partner would hold the rubber. The housemate must aim for house-shaped targets with corresponding points for each: 2 points for each yellow house, 4 points for each blue house, and 8 points for each purple house. Their partner must do four different poses as flashed on the screen to hold the rubber. The pair is given eight chances to shoot per pose and have 32 shots to complete the game. The pair with the most points wins.	Shoichi and Yen; 10 points	Fumiya and Yamyam; 40 points
4	May 9 (Day 40)	Sakay, Shoot, Salo! Each pair member is riding a scooter and bicycle, circling a path shaped like the figure 8. One housemate is the shooter and their partner is the catcher, using a basket above his head. Four balls must be caught by their partner while on a scooter and four while on a bicycle. The pair that completes the game in the least time wins.	Ashley and Tan; 50 minutes, 46 seconds	Lou and Andre; 22 minutes, 57 seconds
Fifth Weekly Task
1	May 14 (Day 45)	Paliparin Mo! Saluhin Mo! I-Shoot Mo! (Fly, Catch, Shoot!); One housemate would fly a paper plane to be caught by their partner while in an airplane runway costume. Their partner would then shoot the paper plane inside the basket. The pair with the most paper planes shot wins.	Angela, Ashley, Batit, Lance; 23 paper planes	Jelay, Kaori, Karina, Lie; 25 paper planes
2	May 15 (Day 46)	Hit the Pako With All Your Might; The pair would need to tap one nail each to drive it down below the surface of the wood using a wiggly hammer. The first pair to complete the game wins.	Sheena, Shoichi, Tan, Yen; 36 minutes, 31 seconds	Jelay, Kaori, Karina, Lie; 33 minutes, 54 seconds
3	May 16 (Day 47)	Pinoy Big Rebound; The pair must roll the ball until it reaches the wall and ensure that the ball rolls back to the safe zone area to proceed with the next ball. If the ball does not reach the safe zone area, the pair would face a consequence: splash of baby powder, ampalaya shots, and a slime shower. The first pair to accomplish four balls in the least time wins.: Rounds / Housemates / Challengers; Round 1 / Batit and Lance; 5 minutes, 16 seconds / Jelay and Kaori; 6 minutes, 14 seconds; Round 2 / Shoichi and Tan; 15 minutes, 11 seconds / Karina and Lie; 20 minutes, 12 seconds	Batit, Lance, Shoichi, Tan	Jelay, Kaori, Karina, Lie

=== Golden Circle Challenges ===
For batch three's nominations and evictions, Big Brother implemented a new immunity challenge called the Golden Circle. Housemates would undergo the normal nomination process; nominees from this process would be barred from joining the challenge as they would already face the public vote. Remaining housemates would participate in the challenge to gain immunity. The losing housemates would join the earlier nominees to face the public vote.

Game No.	Date given	Challenge title and description	Participants	Winner
Week 4
1	April 21 (Day 22)	Headball; Participants need to step on the rocks without touching the ground. This is the only way for them to get different colored balls with corresponding points for each ball, one point for blue ball, three for green, and five for yellow, and transfer the balls to the base where they started. They have to get one ball only before they could get another. The first two participants to get all their balls in the least time wins.: Housemates / Time; Emjay / 5 minutes, 30 seconds; Alfred / 5 minutes, 34 seconds; Ashley / 5 minutes, 48 seconds; Jem / 5 minutes, 59 seconds; Tan / 6 minutes, 47 seconds; Sheena / 6 minutes, 56 seconds; Yen / 7 minutes, 7 seconds; Kyzha / 7 minutes, 20 seconds; Angela / 8 minutes, 13 seconds; Lance / 10 minutes, 52 seconds; Shoichi / 13 minutes, 15 seconds; Gwen / 13 minutes, 20 seconds; Batit / 14 minutes, 14 seconds	Alfred; Angela; Ashley; Batit; Emjay; Gwen; Jem; Kyzha; Lance; Sheena; Shoichi; Tan; Yen	Alfred; Emjay
2	April 24 (Day 25)	Stand 8 Up; Participants have to make 8 markers stand each on the hole of a course shaped number 8. They need to put the markers one by one from the first 8 holes up to the last 8 holes. A Big Bad Wolf would also try to distract the players in completing the game. The first three to finish wins.: Housemates / Time; Ashley / 2 minutes, 15 seconds; Jem / 2 minutes, 39 seconds; Lance / 2 minutes, 52 seconds; Yen / 2 minutes, 54 seconds; Shoichi / 3 minutes, 10 seconds; Gwen / 3 minutes, 13 seconds; Batit / 3 minutes, 15 seconds; Kyzha / 3 minutes, 22 seconds; Tan / 3 minutes, 31 seconds; Angela / 3 minutes, 33 seconds; Sheena / 3 minutes, 34 seconds	Angela; Ashley; Batit; Gwen; Jem; Kyzha; Lance; Sheena; Shoichi; Tan; Yen	Ashley; Jem; Lance
3	April 26 (Day 27)	Golden Disc Roll Challenge; Participants have to shoot three golden discs to three different goals of different distances: 13 ft, 16 ft, 19 ft. Each housemate has only three turns each before they could start again. The first three to complete the challenge wins.	Angela; Batit; Gwen; Kyzha; Sheena; Shoichi; Tan; Yen	Angela; Batit; Kyzha
Week 5
1	April 30 (Day 31)	Basket Boys; Boy participants play basketball as their challenge. Every participant has two shots per round. Depending on their own strategy, they can choose whether to shoot from the free throw or the three-point line. Every successful shoot from the free throw line is equivalent to one X mark, while the three-point line two. Every X mark obtained by the player will be glued to any of the other participants at their discretion. The participant to get five X's is removed from the game. The two remaining participants win. Moreover, they will be the captain and co-captain ball for their weekly task.	Batit; Emjay; Jem; Lance; Mich; Tan	Batit; Lance
2	May 1 (Day 32)	Volleyball Girls; Girl participants play volleyball as their challenge. Every participant need to target the picture of their chosen opponent by serving, spiking, or volleying the ball to topple it down. Every participant has two shots per round. Every successful target would give the participant an X mark to be given to the targeted opponent. The participant to get three X's is out from the game. The two remaining participants win. Moreover, they will be the captain and co-captain for their weekly task.	Angela; Ashley; Kyzha; Sheena; Yen	Angela; ~~Yen~~^{1}
3	May 3 (Day 34)	Flipping Cubes; Using only their one hand, participants have to flip the cubes using a spatula according to the colors asked for each round.If the cube falls down, they have to flip it back to the side with the show's logo. The five participants to do this in the fastest time wins.: Housemates / Time; Emjay / 2 minutes, 16 seconds; Mich / 3 minutes, 18 seconds; Tan / 3 minutes, 32 seconds; Sheena / 3 minutes, 44 seconds; Kyzha / 8 minutes, 3 seconds; Ashley / 8 minutes, 42 seconds	Ashley; Emjay; Kyzha; Mich; Sheena; Tan	Emjay; Kyzha; Mich; Sheena; Tan
Week 6
1	May 11 (Day 42)	Mr. and Ms. PBB TeenM8; Boy participants have to court the girl participant of their choosing to be their partner in the upcoming Mr. and Ms. PBB TeenM8 which will be held by the end of the week. The partners will undergo in a series of competitions: sports wear, talent, and question and answer portion. The two pairs to get the highest average scores wins.: Partners^{2} / Scores / / / / Verdict; Partners^{2} / Sportswear / Talent / Question and Answer / Total / Verdict; Batit and Sheena / 92.75 / 100.00 / 93.75 / 95.50 / Winner; Shoichi and Yen / 98.00 / 98.25 / 89.25 / 95.17 / 1st Runner Up; Lance and Angela / 90.00 / 93.25 / 87.75 / 90.33 / Nominated; Mich and Kyzha / 86.25 / 83.75 / 91.00 / 88.00 / Nominated; Tan and Ashley / 85.00 / 91.00 / 80.50 / 85.50 / Nominated	Angela; Ashley; Batit; Kyzha; Lance; Mich; Sheena; Shoichi; Tan; Yen	Batit; Sheena; Shoichi; Yen

Note

1. Removed due to numerous violations
2. Mich, having received the Black Circle, would be partnered with a mannequin, which later changed to his mother. During the course of the week, however, Emjay's and Mich's mothers got sick and were not able to participate in Mr. and Ms. PBB TeenM8, hence, Kyzha is later partnered with Mich.

=== Pinoy Big Batch-Bakan ===
On Day 7 of the Ultim8 Batch, it was revealed that the four batches will have to battle their way to earn the remaining 4 slots of the Big 8 (Big Otso, as referred by the show) through a series of elimination challenges called the Pinoy Big Batch-Bakan. In every Big 8 slot, the batches will undergo a series of challenges until one batch emerges as the winner. With the exception of the batch winner, the members of the winning batch will then be voted by the public in order to determine the housemate who will get one of the Big 8 slots. The fifth, sixth and seventh slots were filled in this manner.

Challenge No.	Date given	Challenge title and description	Participants	Winner(s)	Eliminated
Batch-Bakan Challenge for the 5th Big 8 slot
1	July 14 (Day 8)	Round 1 Within 45 minutes, the Big 4 of each batch had to shoot a ball in the correct hole by controlling a hanging table maze using the ropes provided. The first three batches with the highest number of balls shot will advance to the next round.	All Batches	Batch 2 (21 points); Batch 4 (21 points); Batch 1 (14 points)	Batch 3 (11 points)
2	July 15 (Day 9)	The Blind Maze; While blindfolded and seated on the floor, each Batch had to collect as many balls as they can while traversing through a maze. If a batch failed to reach the end of the maze after an hour, they will be given a penalty—a deduction of 8 balls from the balls they have collected. They are only allowed to carry the balls within their arms and hands; any other methods or techniques were prohibited. The team with the fewest balls will be eliminated.	Batch 1 Batch 2 Batch 4	Batch 2 (63 balls); Batch 1 (51 balls)	Batch 4 (37 balls)
3	July 17 (Day 11)	The Giant Dice; Each batch must carry and balance a giant dice by holding their respective stick poles while carefully crossing an obstacle. At the end of the obstacle, they have to throw the big dice to a designated platform to correctly match in the right order the three individual dice numbers given. For the last dice number, the batch winner per batch will have to sit out from game, leaving only the three members to finish the said challenge. The first team to match all three dice numbers in the correct order wins the challenge and will have the chance to take the 5th Big Otso throne via public voting.	Batch 1 Batch 2	Batch 2	Batch 1
Batch-Bakan Challenge for the 6th Big 8 slot^{1}
4	July 18 (Day 12)	Memory Race, Part 1 (for the teens); A picture set is given to a member of the team, wherein he has to memorize the items and place the said items in a designated area. for them to get the items, they have to use and wear a pair of a long wooden plank of slippers with ropes attached on it. The items must be placed in the exact order. There will be three rounds to this challenge: easy, average, and difficult. For the easy round, they will get one point for every picture set they have arranged correctly. On the other hand, for the average and difficult rounds, they will get two and three points, respectively. The points accumulated by the teen batches will be used by their respective adult partner batches for their own Pinoy Big Batch-Bakan round.	Batch 1 Batch 3	Batch 1 (17 points)	Batch 3 (1 point)
4	July 18 (Day 12)	Memory Race, Part 2 (for the adults); From the starting area, a team member must run towards the wired fence place on the other side of the activity area wherein 44 items used in the first round are placed on the opposite side of the fence. The housemate must then retrieve one item using only one's fingers towards the top part of the fence. First batch to retrieve all the items will win the round and will face their teen batch partner in the next round. Note that the points garnered by the partner teen batches will be used to deduct the number of items the adult batches will have to retrieve. As to Batch 2, they will have to retrieve 43 out of 44 items; while Batch 4 will have to retrieve 27 out of 44 items.	Batch 2 Batch 4	Batch 4^{2}	Batch 2
5	July 20 (Day 14)	Memory Race, Part 3 Each batch has to retrieve eight bags using their fingers from the other side of a wired fence (the same wired fence used in the previous challenge). However, in this round, to get the bags, they have to follow a path. The said path is divided into several levels; on every level, a member per batch should continue in moving the bag until the last member moves the bag to the end of the path. If the bag drops, they have to start again from the lowest level of the path. Once they completed collecting all the bags, they have to untie all of these bags and retrieve the eight numbers. Once all the numbers have been retrieved, they have to add them all up mentally—they are not allowed to use anything, other than their mental capability, to help them solve the mathematical challenge. If they feel that they have the correct number, they have to raise their flag and proceed to the confession room to tell Big Brother their answer. If the batch is correct, they'll win the challenge; if they are wrong, they will have to wait for 8 minutes to give their another answer.^{3}	Batch 1 Batch 4	Batch 1	Batch 4
Batch-Bakan Challenge for the 7th Big 8 slot
6	July 21 (Day 15)	Round 1 Each member must transfer a ball by rolling it at the one end of a roof-like platform and catch the said ball at the other end without letting the ball bounced off from the platform. A member will have to go back to the starting line if the ball falls while rolling without reaching the other end of the platform or bounces off. If he is successful, he has to place the said ball to a designated container; once done, another member will have to do the same until all the balls are transferred. A batch is given three choices of balls: a basketball (1 point), a billiard ball (2 points), and a rubber ball (3 points). Any member of a batch may choose any kind of ball, but they are still required to completely transfer all the balls to the container within an hour. A batch who fails to transfer all the balls, or who has the longest time to transfer all the balls, or who has the fewest points will be eliminated from the challenge.	All Batches	Batch 1 Batch 2 Batch 4	Batch 3
7	July 23 (Day 17)	Tumba Table; One at a time, each member of each batch had to place either a small block or a big block on a hanging unstable table. If ever a block falls or tumbles on or off the table, they will have to restock their blocks from the start. The batch with the most blocks in a certain amount of time given wins the challenge, and the members of the winning batch will have a chance to win the 7th throne. Separately, they will also have a chance to win a condominium unit.	Batch 1 Batch 2 Batch 4	Batch 2 (47 blocks)	Batch 1 (43 blocks); Batch 4 (0 block)
Bonus	July 24 (Day 18)	Endurance Challenge; The members of the winning batch will have to stand on three separate level footrests against two walls. As instructed by Big Brother, they will have to move to the lower pair of footrests and, later, to the lowest pair at certain points, testing their endurance. The lower the level is, the smaller the footrests get. The last standing housemate wins a condominium unit.	Andre; Lou; Karina; Yen	Yen^{4}	Karina^{4} Lou; Andre

Notes

1. As an advantage, Batch 2 was given the power to pick a teen Batch as an ally for the first round of the challenge, and later for the second round, as an opponent. Batch 2 choose Batch 3.
2. With Batch 4's win, Batch 1 also won the first round of the challenge.
3. The last part of the challenge was redone and invalidated the winning of Batch 1, after the said batch made some number scribbles in their table platform—the challenge was strictly a mental challenge.
4. Fumiya gave his spot for the challenge to Yen; while Yamyam gave his spot to Karina.

==== Eighth spot ====
For the eighth and final throne, there are no elimination rounds. Instead, all batches will play in all rounds, and are ranked accordingly. The batch with the most points are eligible for the final throne. If Andre wins the challenge he automatically gets the throne, making the rest evicted. But if there is a tie between a batch or batch 1, 3, and 4 win, a vote will be done to see who will win.

Batch-Bakan Challenge for the 8th Big 8 slot
Challenge No.	Date given	Challenge title and description	Batch 1	Batch 2	Batch 3	Batch 4
8	July 25 (Day 19)	Round 1 Using seven tetris like blocks, each batch must complete a giant building block puzzle that will have to resemble like a throne. The challenge will be time based, thus, the batch that will finish the challenge first gets the most points. The batch that will finish last, or fails to finish the challenge within the time given will get the fewest points.	4	6	2	8
9	July 26 (Day 20)	Round 2 In this round, only the four batch winners were allowed to participate in the challenge. They were required to make their own makeshift sticks or poles to retrieve billiard balls. Once a billiard ball is retrieved, they will have to transfer them to a fenced area where tubes are placed in the wall; they will have to shoot the balls into the said tubes. The most balls shot into the tubes will earn the most points.	6	4	2	8
10	July 26–27 (Days 20-21)	Round 3 The members who had yet to earn a spot for the Big 8 were separated from the House. They were moved to the Activity Area wherein they will have to compete for the last two remaining rounds. For this round, each batch must transfer a billiard ball using half-open tubes placed on a path figured as a number eight. The first batch to transfer a billiard ball within two minutes wins the highest number of points.	6	8	2	4
11	July 27 (Day 21)	Round 4 For the last round, all members of each batch (including those who had already earned a spot in the Big 8) were eligible to participate. Each batch must pass around a billiard ball using handheld platforms around the 8 figure path used in the earlier round and shoot the said billiard ball in the color coded tube designated to each batch. The batch with the most billiard balls shot in their respective tubes, wins the most points.	4	8	2	6
Total Points			20	26	8	26

=== Ultim8 Challenge ===
The Ultim8 Big Otso Housemates were subjected to another series of challenges to determine the Ultim8 Big 4. A day after the Big Otso was revealed, it was announced that the public was only given 50% of the penultimate vote to decide the Ultim8 Big 4. The other 50% was determined by 100 Gold Bars representing 1% each. Housemates would earn the Golden Bars through a series of challenges.

In the third and fourth challenges, there were finite sets of available bars. Big Brother told the Housemates to agree on a sequence among themselves since the tasks could only be performed by one of them at a time. If there were still available bars at the end of a round, the Housemates would play for the remaining bars in the same sequence. Conversely, the supply of gold bars may run out before the remaining Housemates ever had a chance to play; if this occurs, they would not be able to obtain any bar. The Housemates agreed on the same sequence for both rounds, which is: Ashley, Kaori, Lie, Fumiya, Yamyam, Lou, Kiara, Andre.

Challenge No.	Date given	Golden Bars in Challenge		Challenge title and description
Challenge No.	Date given	Available	Earned	Challenge title and description
1	July 29–30 (Day 23–24)	25	15	First Round; Using the materials provided, the housemates must build a pole to retrieve the golden bars hanging from an apparatus shaped like the number 'eight' from a certain distance. The special task was still active during the challenge, so the Housemates must still remain on the Big Otso platform. Only two housemates may attempt to retrieve the gold bars at a time and any gold bars that are dropped on floor are out of play.
2	July 31 (Day 25)	35	35	Second Round; In seven rounds, the housemates must pull towards them a lace with a certain number of stacked golden bars placed on it. If a stack tumbles down before reaching the finish line, they will have to restack them and start over from the starting line. Once a housemate had successfully pulled the lace to his finish line without tumbling the stacked golden bars, that round automatically ends. The winning housemate per round, except for the sixth and seventh rounds, will have the power to sit out two housemates from playing the challenge in the succeeding round. The first round will have two stacked golden bars; another bar will be added per round.
3	August 1 (Day 26)	50	50	Level-up Round; To gain a golden bar, each of the housemates must use a pair of sticks to bring two bars (first must be a bar with his/her batch color and another with a gold bar) and stack them together at the top of hanging circular maze. After stacking two bars, they must count for three seconds before attempting to try to stack another pair of bars. They are given only 15 minutes to finish this challenge.
Penalties	August 1 (Day 26)	-15		Violation; Before the first round was given, the housemates were informed that every time each of them steps outside the Big Otso platform, a golden bar will be deducted from them. At this certain day, Big Brother announced the number of violations incurred per housemate; per violation means one gold bar deducted from each of them.
4	August 2 (Day 27)	15	15	Recovery of the Confiscated Golden Bars; Together, all of the housemates must stand on a small square platform without letting their feet touch the floor. For every minute they stay on top of the platform, a golden bar will be recovered.
4	August 2 (Day 27)	15	15	Last Round; At the start of the challenge, each housemate was informed by Big Brother that the golden bars they will retrieve will not be added to their individual total but to other housemates of their choice. Knowing such condition, they were asked if they will still do the challenge or not. If they will do the challenge, each of the housemates must transfer a number of gold bars of their choice towards a glass bowl. To enable to transfer the golden bars, such bars must be placed on top of another set of seven black bars horizontally joined by two fingers, one at each end. They only have eight minutes to take the challenge and it depends on how many bars they want to transfer.

==== Golden bars earned ====
Challenge No.	Ashley	Kaori	Lie	Fumiya	Yamyam	Lou	Kiara	Andre
1	0	0	3	1	4	4	2	1
2	0	0	0	0	0	2	18	15
3	5	4	4	8	8	6	4	11
Penalties	-5	0	-1	-1	-1	-1	-3	-3
4	0^{2}	0^{4}	0^{6}	2^{3}	0^{8}	4^{7}	2^{5}	7^{1}
Received	3	1	3	3	3	2	0	0
Total	3	5	9	11	14	13	21	24

Notes

1. Andre earned seven gold bars and gave two each to Fumiya, Lou and Yamyam, and one to Ashley; he received nothing from the other housemates.
2. Ashley did not get any gold bar; but received three gold bars, one each from Andre, Kiara and Lou.
3. Fumiya earned two gold bars and gave them all to Lie; he received three gold bars, two from Andre and one from Lou.
4. Kaori did not get any gold bar; but received one gold bar from Kiara.
5. Kiara earned two gold bars and gave one each to Ashley and Kaori; she received nothing from the other housemates.
6. Lie did not get any gold bar; but received three gold bars, two from Fumiya and one from Lou.
7. Lou earned four gold bars and gave one each to Ashley, Fumiya, Lie and Yamyam; she received two gold bars from Andre.
8. Yamyam did not get any gold bar; but received three gold bars, two from Andre and one from Lou.

== Nomination history ==
In every nomination, each housemate has to nominate two people with the first receiving two points and the second with one point.

=== Batch 1: Teens ===
During the merged batch twist, the Big 4 of this batch (namely: Jelay, Kaori, Lie and Karina) were dubbed as Solid 4G. The batch was later assigned with blue as the batch's official color and with the #Batch1AndOnly as the batch's official hashtag code. Their batch light sticks feature a blue heart.

The First Day, November 10, 2018, is the Day 1 of this batch, and Day 1 overall. January 6, 2019 is Day 58 of this batch, and Day 58 overall.

	#1	Big Celebr8ty Challenge			Decem- versus	#6	Big Jump		Big8ting Salubong	Batch Winner Reveal	Nominations received
	#1	#2	#3	#4	#5	#6	#7		#8	#9	Nominations received
Eviction Day and Date	Day 9 November 18	Day 16 November 25	Day 23 December 2	Day 30 December 9	Day 37 December 16	Day 51 December 30	Day 54 January 2	Day 57 January 5	Day 58 January 6	Day 7 July 13	Nominations received
Nomination Day and Date	Day 9 November 18	Day 16; November 25	Day 23; December 2	Day 29; December 8	Day 37; December 16	Day 44; December 23	Day 53; January 1	Day 55; January 3	—	—	Nominations received
Lie	Josh; Art	Art; Karina	Rhys; Aljon	No nominations	Ali; Reign	No nominations	No nominations	No nominations	Finalist (Exited; Day 58)	Batch Winner (Day 7)	10 (+2)
Karina	Art; Josh	Criza; Art	Criza; Rhys	No nominations	Ali; Lie	No nominations	No nominations	No nominations	Finalist (Exited; Day 58)	Runner-Up (Day 7)	4 (+3)
Kaori	Josh; Art	Criza; Art	Criza; Seth	No nominations	Ali; Lie	No nominations	No nominations	Finalist	Finalist (Exited; Day 58)	Third Place (Day 7)	5 (+2)
Jelay	Art; Josh	Criza; Art	Criza; Karina	No nominations	Lie; Ali	No nominations	Finalist		Finalist (Exited; Day 58)	Fourth Place (Day 7)	2 (+1)
Seth	Josh; Art	Criza; Art	Aljon; Criza	No nominations	Ali; Rhys	No nominations	No nominations	No nominations	Evicted (Day 57)		8 (+3)
Reign	Not in the House				Jelay; Ali	No nominations	No nominations	No nominations	Evicted (Day 57)		1 (+2)
Rhys	Not in the House		Seth; Criza	No nominations	Lie; Seth	No nominations	No nominations	Evicted (Day 54)			4 (+1)
Missy	Not in the House					No nominations	Voluntary Exit (Day 51)				0 (+1)
Ali	Not in the House			No nominations	Karina; Seth	Evicted (Day 37)					10
Aljon	Josh; Lie	Criza; Art	Seth; Criza	No nominations	Evicted (Day 30)						4 (+1)
Criza	Not in the House	Art; Kaori	Kaori; Aljon	Evicted (Day 23)							21
Art	Lie; Josh	Criza; Seth	Evicted (Day 16)								16
Josh	Kaori; Lie	Evicted (Day 9)									11
Notes	^{See Note 1}	^{none}		^{See Notes 2}^{,} ^{3}	^{none}	^{See Notes 4}^{,} ^{5}	^{See Note 6}	^{See Note 7}	^{See Note 8}		
Immunity	Karina; Seth	Aljon; Lie	Jelay; Lie	Ali; Lie; Rhys; Seth	none	Jelay; Karina; Rhys	none	Kaori	Open Voting	Open Voting Closed	
Up for eviction	Art; Josh; Lie	Art; Criza; Kaori; Karina; Seth	Aljon; Criza; Seth	Aljon; Jelay; Kaori; Karina; ~~Seth~~	Ali; Jelay; Karina; Lie; Seth	Kaori; Lie; Missy; Reign; Seth	Karina; Rhys; Seth	Karina; Lie; Reign; Seth	Open Voting	Open Voting Closed	
Saved from eviction	Lie; 61.00% Art; 20.37%	Karina; 26.67% Seth; 24.11% Kaori; 23.77% Criza; 16.02%	Seth; 45.41% Aljon; 44.14%	Kaori; 30.15% Karina; 24.31% Jelay; 23.41%	Seth; 29.88% Lie; 23.78% Jelay; 22.68% Karina; 21.97%	Kaori; Lie; Reign; Seth; Saved by default	Seth; Karina; Won Ligtask	Lie; 38.28% Karina; 31.89%	Housemate A 37.48%	Lie; 37.48%	
Evicted	Josh; 18.63%	Art; 9.24%	Criza; 10.44%	Aljon; 22.13%	Ali; 1.69%	Eviction cancelled	Rhys; Lost Ligtask	Seth; 26.64% Reign; 3.19%	Housemate B 29.22% Housemate C 23.52% Housemate D 9.79%	Karina; 29.22% Kaori; 23.52% Jelay; 9.79%	
Voluntary Exit	none					Missy	none		Housemate B 29.22% Housemate C 23.52% Housemate D 9.79%	Karina; 29.22% Kaori; 23.52% Jelay; 9.79%	
References											

Legend

Housemate received immunity after winning, or finishing a task, or winning the Big Celebr8ty Challenge.
Housemate received automatic nomination for failure of a task.
Housemate received automatic nomination for violation of rules and cannot take participate in the Big Celebr8ty Challenge.

Notes

1. Karina and Seth were chosen as the pair with the best performance during their weekly task. They were awarded ₱8,888 each and immunity for the first round of nominations.
2. Aljon, Jelay, and Seth were nominated for violation of house rules. They are given a chance to save themselves from nomination by passing their fourth weekly task. In their weekly task, only two out of three balls were successfully shot, which means only two of them can be saved. The three chose Aljon to remain nominated.
3. The Big Celebr8ty Challenge determined who was nominated for eviction. As Aljon was still automatically nominated, he could not participate in the challenge.
4. Weekly task determined who was nominated for eviction.
5. Missy voluntarily exited; feeling that the other Housemates who stayed longer than her deserved to win more. Before she exited from the house, Big Brother announced that the eviction will be canceled, due to Missy's voluntary exit.
6. For forfeiting the first Big Jump Challenge, Big Brother gave a task to Karina, Rhys, and Seth to save themselves from eviction. They failed the task, forcing the three to take part in a Special Ligtask challenge where the loser would be evicted. Since Rhys finished last, he was automatically evicted from the House.
7. Big Jump challenge determined who will be nominated for eviction. This was a double eviction.
8. Voting for the Batch Winner was held prior to the Big Four exiting the house, with the percentages of the votes being revealed; but the actual standings of the Big Four were not revealed until Day 7 of the Ultim8 Batch on July 13, 2019.

=== Batch 2: Adults ===
During the merged batch twist, the Big 4 of this batch (namely: Lou, Andre, Yamyam, and Fumiya) were dubbed as Team LAYF. The batch was later assigned with green as the batch's official color and with the #Batch2getherForever as the batch's official hashtag code. Their batch light sticks feature a green star.

January 6, 2019 is the Day 1 of this batch, and Day 58 overall. March 31, 2019 is Day 85 of this batch, and Day 142 overall.

	#1	#2	#3	#4	Duel	Pinoy Big Battle		Big Jump	Big8ting Reveal	Big8ting Summer Salubong	Batch Winner Reveal	Nominations received
	#1	#2	#3	#4	#5	#6	#7	#8	#9	#10	#11	Nominations received
Eviction Day and Date	Day 29 February 3	Day 36 February 10	Day 43 February 17	Day 50 February 24	Day 57 March 3	Day 64 March 10	Day 71 March 17	Day 78 March 24	Day 82 March 27	Day 85 March 31	Day 7 July 13	Nominations received
Nomination Day and Date	Day 22; January 27	Day 30; February 4	Day 37; February 11	—	—	Day 64; March 10	Day 71; March 17	Day 77; March 23	Day 78; March 24	—	—	Nominations received
Yamyam	Apey; Wakim	Apey; Mitch	Wakim; Tori	No nominations	No nominations	Mary Grace; Lou	Hanie; Lou	Finalist		Finalist (Exited; Day 85)	Batch Winner (Day 7)	10 (+2)
Fumiya	Wakim; Apey	Apey; Lou	Wakim; Mark	No nominations	No nominations	Mark; Lou	Lou; Hanie	No nominations	No nominations	Finalist (Exited; Day 85)	Runner-Up (Day 7)	2 (+4)
Lou	Wakim; Apey	Apey; Fumiya	Wakim; Tori	No nominations	No nominations	Mark; Mary Grace	Hanie; Thea	No nominations	No nominations	Finalist (Exited; Day 85)	Third Place (Day 7)	21 (+3)
Andre	Abi; Apey	Mark; Mitch	Mark; Mitch	No nominations	No nominations	Mary Grace; Yamyam	Hanie; Thea	No nominations	No nominations	Finalist (Exited; Day 85)	Fourth Place (Day 7)	4 (+2)
Shawntel	Not in the House					Mary Grace; Fumiya	Yamyam; Lou	No nominations	No nominations	Evicted (Day 82)		0 (+3)
Thea	Not in the House					Andre; Mary Grace	Hanie; Yamyam	No nominations	No nominations	Evicted (Day 82)		5 (+3)
Camille	Not in the House						Lou; Hanie	No nominations	Evicted (Day 78)			0 (+3)
Kim	Not in the House						Lou; Thea	No nominations	Evicted (Day 78)			0 (+1)
Hanie	Not in the House				No nominations	Mark; Mary Grace	Thea; Yamyam	Evicted (Day 71)				10
Mark	2-in-1 with Apey (Days 13–27)	Lou; Mitch	Wakim; Yamyam	No nominations	No nominations	Lou; Andre	Evicted (Day 64)					16
Mary Grace	Not in the House		Exempt	No nominations	No nominations	Mark; Yamyam	Evicted (Day 64)					9
JC	Not in the House			Exempt	No nominations	Evicted (Day 57)						0 (+1)
Wakim	Abi; Lou	Apey; Lou	Lou; Mitch	No nominations	Evicted (Day 50)							23 (+2)
Mitch	Wakim; Andre	Mark; Yamyam	Wakim; Tori	No nominations	Evicted (Day 50)							5 (+1)
Tori	Not in the House	Exempt	Wakim; Mark	Evicted (Day 43)								3
Apey	2-in-1 with Mark (Days 13–27)	Lou; Yamyam	Evicted (Day 36)									8
Apey Mark	Wakim; Yamyam	2-in-1 connection split by Big Brother (Day 29)										6
Abi	Wakim; Apey	Evicted (Day 29)										4
Notes	^{See Note 1}	^{See Notes 2}^{,} ^{3}^{,} ^{4}	^{See Note 5}	^{See Note 6}	^{See Note 7}	^{See Note 8}	^{See Note 9}	^{See Note 10}	^{See Note 11}	^{See Note 12}	^{See Note 13}	
Immunity	none			Andre; Mark; Mary Grace	Andre; Hanie; Mark; Mary Grace	Shawntel	Camille; Kim	Andre; Lou; Yamyam	none	Open Voting	Open Voting Closed	
Up for eviction	Abi; Apey & Mark; Wakim	Apey; Lou; Wakim	Mark; Tori; Wakim	Fumiya; Lou; Mitch; Wakim; Yamyam	Fumiya; JC; Lou; Yamyam	Lou; Mark; Mary Grace; Thea	Andre; Hanie; Lou; Shawntel; Thea	Camille; Fumiya; Kim; Shawntel; Thea	Andre; Fumiya; Lou; Shawntel; Thea	Open Voting	Open Voting Closed	
Saved from eviction	Wakim; 38.76% Apey & Mark; 38.65%	Lou; 55.53% Wakim; 28.98%	Wakim; 38.25% Mark; 35.73%	Yamyam; 38.72% Lou; 25.58% Fumiya; 23.34%	Yamyam; 39.76% Fumiya; 34.01% Lou; 21.20%	Lou; 53.43% Thea; 28.32%	Lou; 37.07% Andre; 25.65% Shawntel; 17.54% Thea; 14.65%	Fumiya; 87.50% Thea; 5.33% Shawntel; 4.52%	Fumiya; 54.83% Lou; 21.98% Andre; 12.27%	Housemate A 52.90%	Yamyam; 52.90%	
Evicted	Abi; 22.59%	Apey; 15.49%	Tori; 26.02%	Wakim; 7.66% Mitch; 4.70%	JC; 5.03%	Mark; 16.86% Mary Grace; 1.40%	Hanie; 5.09%	Camille; 1.60% Kim; 1.05%	Shawntel; 5.56% Thea; 5.16%	Housemate B 27.87% Housemate C 15.21% Housemate D 4.02%	Fumiya; 27.87% Lou; 15.21% Andre; 4.02%	
References												

Legend

Housemate received immunity after winning, or finishing a task.
Housemate received automatic nomination for violation of rules, or failure of task.

Notes

1. During the first round of nominations, all the nomination points were given to Apey and none to Mark. However, since both are considered 2-in-1 housemates a nomination for one is a nomination for the other.
2. On Day 27, after gaining the public's and the housemates' vote, Apey & Mark were separated as a 2-in-1 housemate (for details with the results, see 2-in-1 vote results).
3. Wakim was automatically nominated after he had earned the most violations (11 violations) in the House. He was ineligible to be nominated on that week's nomination night, and only the two housemates with the most points were nominated that week.
4. As a new housemate and having entered partway through the week, Tori was exempt from nominations.
5. As a new housemate and having entered partway through the week, Mary Grace was exempt from nominations.
6. As a new housemate, JC was exempt from nominations. No nominations took place as the weekly task determined who was nominated for eviction. This was also a double eviction.
7. The housemates had to participate in Duel Challenge, wherein the losing housemates were automatically evicted and the winners would become the Big Four, as told by Big Brother. But unknown to them, the losing housemates were only falsely evicted, moving to a secret room in the house rather than leaving the house; not knowing that their stay in the House were extended from 8 weeks to 88 days (or roughly more than 12 weeks). Yamyam, Andre, Lou, and Fumiya were automatically nominated after losing their respective challenges to Mark, Hanie, Mary Grace and JC.
8. The result of the Ultim8 Pinoy Big Battle against the Star Dreamers was determined if the housemates were saved from the eviction or not. As Camp Star Hunt won, the Housemates faced a double eviction. Thea, as team leader of the housemates, was automatically nominated as a result. Conversely, Shawntel as the leader of Camp Star Hunt, was immune from nominations.
9. As Andre and Shawntel were leaders of Camp Star Hunt and lost the 2nd Pinoy Big Battle, they were automatically nominated. Camille and Kim as leaders of the Housemates, were immune from being nominated for winning.
10. Fumiya was automatically nominated after he and Yamyam lost the first Big Jump challenge. Round 2 of the Big Jump Challenger determined who was nominated. As Andre, Lou, and Yamyam won, they were immune from eviction. Everyone else was nominated. This was a double eviction.
11. Voting for the Big Four started on Day 78 and the results were announced on March 27.
12. Voting for the Batch Winner started after the Big Four was revealed.
13. Voting for the Batch Winner was held prior to the Big Four exiting the house, with the percentages of the votes being revealed; but the actual standings of the Big Four were not revealed until Day 7 of the Ultim8 Batch on July 13, 2019.

==== 2-in-1 vote results ====
On Day 27, within 88 minutes after the eviction night episode, the housemates and the public voted in whether Apey & Mark should continue as a 2-in-1 housemate. The housemates received 50% of the vote while the public got the other 50%. The table below was the official results of the poll and was revealed on Day 28. However, Apey & Mark were earlier informed of the possible split of the two. They were briefed that after 88 minutes, the two will know the results through the lamp posts placed in the pool area. With one already lit, if another lamp post will be lit, it would mean that they will be separated as individual housemates. After the said period, the second lamp posts were lit indicating their separation from being a 2-in-1 housemate.

Should Apey & Mark continue as a 2-in-1 Housemate?
	Housemates' Vote	Public's Vote	Total
Andre	No		
Fumiya	No		
Lou	No		
Mitch	No		
Wakim	Yes		
Yamyam	No		
Yes	8.4% 1 of 6 votes	15.4%	23.8%
No	41.7% 5 of 6 votes	34.5%	76.2%

=== Batch 3: Teens ===
During the merged batch twist, the Big 4 of this batch (namely: Tan, Batit, Ashley, and Yen) were dubbed as Team TBAY. The batch was later assigned with red as the batch's official color and with the #BatchUltimate3hreat as the batch's official hashtag code. Their batch light sticks feature a red flame.

March 31, 2019 is the Day 1 of this batch, and Day 142 overall. May 26, 2019 is Day 57 of this batch, and Day 198 overall.

	Golden Circle Challenges				Black Circle Nominations	PBB Mr. & Ms. TeenM8 2019	Big Jump		Big8ting Housem8tes Salubong	Batch Winner Reveal	Nominations received
	#1		#2		#3		#4	#5	#6	#7	Nominations received
Eviction Day and Date	Day 29 April 28		Day 36 May 5		Day 43 May 12		Day 53 May 22	Day 55 May 24	Day 57 May 26	Day 7 July 13	Nominations received
Nomination Day and Date	Day 22; April 21	Days 22–27; April 21–26	Day 30; April 29	Days 31–35; April 30–May 4	Day 37; May 6	Day 42; May 11	Days 48–49; May 17–18	Day 54; May 23	—	—	Nominations received
Ashley	Shami; Narcy	No nominations	Alfred; Angela	No nominations	Angela	No nominations	No nominations	No nominations	Finalist (Exited; Day 57)	Batch Winner (Day 7)	3 (+4)
Yen	Narcy; Mich	No nominations	Gwen; Alfred	No nominations	Mich	No nominations	No nominations	No nominations	Finalist (Exited; Day 57)	Runner-Up (Day 7)	0 (+4)
Tan	Mich; Shoichi	No nominations	Gwen; Shoichi	No nominations	Mich	No nominations	No nominations	Finalist	Finalist (Exited; Day 57)	Third Place (Day 7)	2 (+2)
Batit	Shami; Alfred	No nominations	Alfred; Mich	No nominations	Shoichi	No nominations	Finalist		Finalist (Exited; Day 57)	Fourth Place (Day 7)	0
Angela	Narcy; Shami	No nominations	Gwen; Alfred	No nominations	Tan	No nominations	No nominations	No nominations	Evicted (Day 55)		3 (+3)
Lance	Narcy; Shami	No nominations	Gwen; Alfred	No nominations	Tan	No nominations	No nominations	No nominations	Evicted (Day 55)		0 (+2)
Sheena	Mich; Shami	No nominations	Alfred; Shoichi	No nominations	Mich	No nominations	No nominations	Evicted (Day 53)			2 (+2)
Shoichi	Kyzha; Angela	No nominations	Kyzha; Gwen	No nominations	Kyzha	No nominations	No nominations	Evicted (Day 53)			9 (+2)
Mich	Shami; Gwen	No nominations	Gwen; Sheena	No nominations	Ashley	No nominations	Evicted (Day 43)				17 (+1)
Kyzha	Shoichi; Mich	No nominations	Gwen; Alfred	No nominations	Shoichi	No nominations	Evicted (Day 43)				5 (+1)
Emjay	Shami; Alfred	No nominations	Alfred; Shoichi	No nominations	Sheena	No nominations	Forced Eviction (Day 43)				0 (+1)
Jem	Alfred; Mich	No nominations	Alfred; Gwen	No; Nominations	Evicted (Day 36)						0 (+1)
Gwen	Mich; Narcy	No nominations	Alfred; Shoichi	No nominations	Evicted (Day 36)						17 (+1)
Alfred	Shami; Gwen	No nominations	Ashley; Gwen	No nominations	Evicted (Day 36)						20
Shami	Mich; Narcy	No nominations	Evicted (Day 29)								14
Narcy	Mich; Shami	No nominations	Evicted (Day 29)								9
Notes	^{See Note 1}	^{See Note 2}	^{See Note 3}	^{See Note 4}	^{See Notes 5}	^{See Notes 6}^{,} ^{7}	^{See Note 8}	^{See Note 9}	^{See Note 10}		
Immunity	none	Alfred; Angela; Ashley; Batit; Emjay; Jem; Kyzha; Lance	none	Angela; Batit; Emjay; Kyzha; Lance; Mich; Sheena; Tan	none	Batit; Sheena; Shoichi; Yen	Batit; Lance; Tan	Tan	Open Voting	Open Voting Closed	
Up for eviction	Mich; Narcy; Shami	Gwen; Sheena; Shoichi; Tan; Yen	Alfred; Gwen; Shoichi	Ashley; Jem; Yen	Mich	Angela; Ashley; Emjay; Kyzha; Lance; Tan	Angela; Ashley; Sheena; Shoichi; Yen	Angela; Ashley; Lance; Yen	Open Voting	Open Voting Closed	
Saved from eviction	Tan; 22.07% Yen; 20.33% Shoichi; 16.44% Sheena; 15.52% Mich; 13.56% Gwen; 5.35%		Ashley; 69.93% Yen; 10.54% Shoichi; 8.03%		Ashley; 46.04% Tan; 22.25% Angela; 16.68% Lance; 6.39%		Ashley; 55.89% Angela; 17.39% Yen; 9.69%	Ashley; 56.45% Yen; 22.70%	Housemate A 63.38%	Ashley; 63.38%	
Evicted	Shami; 3.78% Narcy; 2.44%		Jem; 5.98% Gwen; 2.90% Alfred; 2.62%		Mich; 5.99% Kyzha; 2.65%		Sheena; 9.57% Shoichi; 7.46%	Angela; 13.00% Lance; 7.86%	Housemate B 13.92% Housemate C 12.78% Housemate D 9.92%	Yen; 13.92% Tan; 12.78% Batit; 9.92%	
Forced Eviction	none				Emjay		none		Housemate B 13.92% Housemate C 12.78% Housemate D 9.92%	Yen; 13.92% Tan; 12.78% Batit; 9.92%	
References											

Legend

Housemate received immunity after winning, or finishing a task, or winning a Golden Circle Challenge.
Housemate received an automatic nomination for violation of rules, or failure of task, or lost the Golden Circle Challenges for that week.
Housemate had already been nominated and cannot take part in Golden Circle challenges.

Notes

1. During the first nominations, Mich, Narcy, and Shami received the most nomination points. They are nominated and were excluded from participating in a series of Golden Circle Challenges.
2. Alfred, Emjay, Ashley, Jem, Lance, Angela, Batit, and Kyzha earned their Golden Circles and thus were saved from upcoming eviction for the week. The following eviction was a double eviction.
3. During the second nominations, Alfred, Gwen, and Shoichi received the most nomination points and were barred from participating in the Golden Circle Challenges for the week.
4. Lance and Batit earned their spot during the first set of Golden Circle Challenge. Angela and Yen earned their spot during the second Golden Circle Challenge. However, due to violation, Yen was stripped off of her Golden Circle and was automatically nominated for the week, together with Jem. Emjay, Mich, Tan, Sheena, and Kyzha were the last 5 to complete the 8 Golden Circles. The second eviction night was a triple eviction.
5. The housemates faced a face-to-face nomination wherein the housemate to receive the most Black Circle would be put on automatic nomination. Mich, receiving 3 Black Circles, was automatically nominated and was given a disadvantage at Mr. and Ms. PBB TeenM8 2019.
6. Mr. and Ms. PBB TeenM8 2019 determined who was nominated for eviction. Winners Batit and Sheena and Runners-Up Shoichi and Yen earned their Golden Circles and were safe for the upcoming triple eviction.
7. While Emjay was initially competing in Mr. and Ms. PBB TeenM8 2019, he later contracted an illness which forced him out of the competition, automatically nominating him. He would later be Force Evicted, resulting in only two people leaving the house come eviction night, instead of the planned triple eviction.
8. Big Jump Challenge determined who was nominated. Batit won the first Big Jump Challenge. Lance and Tan, who reached Round 2 of Big Jump Challenge were both safe from eviction. Shoichi and Yen are automatically nominated for not taking part of the Big Jump Challenge. Angela, Ashley, and Sheena were put on nomination for not reaching Round 2 of the Big Jump Challenge.
9. Big Brother gave the housemates an individual task except Batit. Unknown to them, they were actually fighting for the second Big Jump Challenge. Tan won the second Big Jump Challenge. Voting for Big 4 was immediately opened right after the announcement of Tan's win.
10. Voting for the Batch Winner was held prior to the Big Four exiting the house, with the percentages of the votes being revealed; but the actual standings of the Big Four were not revealed until Day 7 of the Ultim8 Batch on July 13, 2019.

=== Batch 4: Adults ===
During the merged batch twist, the Big 4 of this batch (namely: Wealand, Argel, Kiara, and Akie) were dubbed as Team WAKA. The batch was later assigned with yellow as the batch's official color and with the #Batch4TheWin as the batch's official hashtag code. Their batch light sticks feature a yellow sun.

May 26, 2019 is the Day 1 of this batch, and Day 198 overall. July 7, 2019 is Day 43 of this batch, and Day 240 overall.

	#1	#2	#3	Big Jump		Batch Winner	Batch Winner Reveal	Nominations received
	#1	#2	#3	#4	#5	#6	#7	Nominations received
Eviction Day and Date	Day 15 June 9	Day 21 June 15	Day 29 June 23	Day 36 June 30	Day 42 July 6	Day 43 July 7	Day 7 July 13	Nominations received
Nomination Day and Date	Day 7 June 1	Day 16; June 10	Day 24; June 18	Day 31–35; June 25–29	Day 42; July 6	—	—	Nominations received
Kiara	Mae; Jamie	Franki; Mae	~~Akie, Diana,~~; ~~Franki, Gino~~	No nominations	No nominations	Finalist (Day 43)	Batch Winner (Day 7)	4 (+2)
Argel	Sky; Gino	Franki; Wealand	~~Sky, Kiara,~~; ~~Akie, Gino~~	No nominations	No nominations	Finalist (Day 43)	Runner-Up (Day 7)	2 (+1)
Wealand	Banjo; Mae	Mae; Akie	~~Sky, Kiara,~~; ~~Akie, Gino~~	No nominations	Finalist	Finalist (Day 43)	Third Place (Day 7)	2 (+2)
Akie	Mae; Sky	Franki; Mae	~~Franki, Sky,~~; ~~Argel, Wealand~~	Finalist		Finalist (Day 43)	Fourth Place (Day 7)	6
Diana	Jamie; Mae	Akie; Franki	~~Franki, Sky,~~; ~~Argel, Wealand~~	No nominations	No nominations	Evicted (Day 42)		1 (+1)
Franki	Jamie; Banjo	Kiara; Sky	~~Sky, Kiara,~~; ~~Akie, Gino~~	No nominations	No nominations	Evicted (Day 42)		13 (+2)
Sky	Franki; Jamie	Argel; Akie	~~Akie, Diana,~~; ~~Franki, Gino~~	No nominations	Evicted (Day 36)			6 (+1)
Gino	Jamie; Mae	Akie; Franki	~~Franki, Sky,~~; ~~Argel, Wealand~~	No nominations	Evicted (Day 36)			1 (+1)
Hasna	Mae; Jamie	Franki; Diana	~~Akie, Diana,~~; ~~Franki, Gino~~	Evicted (Day 29)				0 (+1)
Mae	Jamie; Franki	Kiara; Wealand	Evicted (Day 21)					14
Jamie	Sky; Banjo	Evicted (Day 15)						13
Banjo	Jamie; Mae	Forced Eviction (Day 10)						4
Notes	^{See Note 1}	^{none}	^{See Note 2}	^{See Note 3}	^{none}	^{See Note 4}	^{See Note 5}	
Immunity	none		Akie; Diana; Gino	Akie; Argel	Wealand	Open Voting	Open Voting Closed	
Up for eviction	Jamie; Mae; Sky	Akie; Franki; Kiara; Mae	Argel; Franki; Hasna; Kiara; Sky; Wealand	~~Argel~~; Diana; Franki; Gino; Kiara; Sky; Wealand	Argel; Diana; Franki; Kiara	Open Voting	Open Voting Closed	
Saved from eviction	Sky; 69.9% Mae; 21.14%	Kiara; 36.44% Franki; 24.64% Akie; 23.55%	Kiara; 27.81% Argel; 21.75% Franki; 16.78% Wealand; 14.84% Sky; 12.37%	Wealand; 20.24% Kiara; 20.19% Franki; 17.57% Diana; 15.44%	Kiara; 42.48% Argel; 24.95%	Housemate A 50.24%	Kiara; 50.24%	
Evicted	Jamie; 8.96%	Mae; 15.37%	Hasna; 6.46%	Sky; 15.15 % Gino; 11.41 %	Diana; 21.54% Franki; 11.02%	Housemate B 27.90% Housemate C 16.29% Housemate D 5.57%	Argel; 27.90% Wealand; 16.29% Akie; 5.57%	
Forced Eviction	Banjo	none				Housemate B 27.90% Housemate C 16.29% Housemate D 5.57%	Argel; 27.90% Wealand; 16.29% Akie; 5.57%	
References								

Legend

Housemate received immunity after winning, or finishing a task.
Housemate received automatic nomination for violation of rules, or failure of task.

Notes

1. Banjo was force evicted after he had made sexist jokes, causing the girls to feel uncomfortable. Despite this, the eviction of that week was not canceled.
2. Gino, Kiara and Argel were nominated by the housemates as leaders of an, at that time, unknown task. The housemates were later divided into three groups: Gino with Aki and Diana (Team Gino); Kiara with Sky and Hasna (Team Kiara); and Argel with Franki and Wealand (Team Argel). As part of their weekly task, each team was required to openly vote 4 housemates they wanted to nominate. The nominated housemates were not yet considered official as, at the end of the weekly task, only the members of the two losing teams will become officially nominated. However, on Day 27, after the numerous stealing incidents that happened in the week's competition, Big Brother decided to disregard the earlier open nomination (thus, the reason for the struck out votes in the table), and instead decided to place all the members of the would-be two losing teams as the official nominees. On Day 28, Team Gino won the group task, thereby placing the Teams Argel and Kiara as automatically nominated.
3. Big Jump Challenge determined who was nominated. Akie, as winner of the Big Jump Challenge, had to choose two housemates to face off in a Ligtask challenge, with the winner being safe. Akie chose Argel and Wealand, with the former winning the LigTask. The following eviction night was a double eviction.
4. Unlike in the previous three batches, this Batch did not have a B8gating Salubong as the Big 4 of this batch remained in the House and became part of the Ultim8 Batch.
5. Voting for the Batch Winner was held prior to the start of the Ultim8 Batch, with the percentages of the votes being revealed; but the actual standings of the Big Four were not revealed until Day 7 of the Ultim8 Batch on July 13, 2019.

=== Ultim8 Batch ===
Note that July 7, 2019 served as the Day 1 of this batch, which is the Day 240 of this season. The last day, August 4, 2019, is Day 29 for this batch and is the Day 268 of this season.

	Batch Winners Reveal	Pinoy Big Batch-Bakan					Big Night	
	#1	#2	#3	#4	#5		#6	
Voting Day and Date	Day 7 July 13	Day 11; July 17	Day 14; July 20	Day 18; July 24	Day 21; July 27		Day 28; August 3	Day 29; August 4
Yamyam	Eligible	Finalist					Advanced	Winner
Kiara	Eligible	Finalist					Advanced	Runner-up
Lou	Eligible	Eligible	Ineligible	Eligible	Finalist		Advanced	3rd Place
Andre	Eligible	Eligible	Ineligible	Eligible	Eligible		Advanced	4th Place
Fumiya	Eligible	Eligible	Finalist				5th Place	Exited (Day 28)
Lie	Eligible	Finalist					6th Place	Exited (Day 28)
Ashley	Eligible	Finalist					7th Place	Exited (Day 28)
Kaori	Eligible	Ineligible	Eligible	Finalist			8th Place	Exited (Day 28)
Argel	Eligible	Ineligible	Ineligible	Ineligible	Eligible		Evicted (Day 21)	
Wealand	Eligible	Ineligible	Ineligible	Ineligible	Eligible		Evicted (Day 21)	
Akie	Eligible	Ineligible	Ineligible	Ineligible	Eligible		Evicted (Day 21)	
Jelay	Eligible	Ineligible	Eligible	Ineligible	Ineligible	Evicted (Day 21)		
Karina	Eligible	Ineligible	Eligible	Ineligible	Ineligible	Evicted (Day 21)		
Batit	Eligible	Ineligible	Ineligible	Ineligible	Ineligible	Evicted (Day 21)		
Tan	Eligible	Ineligible	Ineligible	Ineligible	Ineligible	Evicted (Day 21)		
Yen	Eligible	Ineligible	Ineligible	Ineligible	Ineligible	Evicted (Day 21)		
Notes	^{See Note 1}	^{none}			^{See Note 2}		^{See Note 3}	^{See Note 4}
Eligible for the Big Night	All Housemates	Andre; Fumiya; Lou	Jelay; Kaori; Karina	Andre; Lou	Akie; Andre; Argel; Wealand		Challenge; Score + Open; Voting	Open Voting
Advanced to the Big Night	Ashley; Kiara; Lie; Yamyam as Batch Winners	Fumiya; 62.1%	Kaori; 44.75%	Lou; 51.59%	Andre; 57.85%		Kiara; 21.43% Yamyam; 19.33% Andre; 14.12% Lou; 10.37%	Yamyam; 58.52%
Not Selected	Akie; Andre; Argel; Batit; Fumiya; Jelay; Kaori; Karina; Lou; Tan; Wealand; Yen	Lou; 31.57% Andre; 6.33%	Karina; 42.66% Jelay; 12.59%	Andre; 48.41%	Jelay; Karina; Batit; Tan; Yen; Evicted by Batch-Bakan	Argel; 22.36% Wealand; 15.77% Akie; 4.02%	Fumiya; 9.96% Lie; 9.60% Ashley; 9.16% Kaori; 6.03%	Kiara; 30.29% Lou; 8.28% Andre; 2.91%
References								

Batch membership

Batch 1

Batch 2

Batch 3

Batch 4

Legend

Housemate won the Big Batch-Bakan and was nominated to become part of the Big Otso.

Note

1. The Batch Winner was revealed on Day 7. For becoming the Batch Winners; Lie, Yamyam, Ashley, and Kiara were automatically given spots to the Big Night. For the voting percentages, refer to the above tables.
2. Upon losing the final Big Batch-Bakan; Batit, Jelay, Karina, Tan, and Yen were all evicted. Batch 3 and Batch 4 tied for first place in the Batch-Bakan; thus, both batches were up for voting for the Eighth Big Otso slot. The unselected Housemates were also evicted that night.
3. In addition to the public voting, the Ultim8 Big Otso competed in the Ultim8 Challenge where they would win Golden Bars that would earn them votes to become part of the Ultim8 Big Four. Half of the votes were determined by the challenge, while the other half of the votes came from the Public.
4. After the Ultim8 Big 4 was determined, the voting percentages of the four housemates were reset to zero.

== Celebr8 at the Big Night ==
The Big Night for this season was held at the AATF Sports Complex in Imus, Cavite on August 3 and 4, 2019. The finale featured variety of Kapamilya stars, Ex-Star Dreamers, Ex-housemates and other former housemates including past Pinoy Big Brother Big Winners such as Nene Tamayo of Season 1, Keanna Reeves of Celebrity 1, Ejay Falcon of Teen Plus, James Reid of Teen Clash, Myrtle Sarrosa of Teen 4, Daniel Matsunaga of All In, Miho Nishida and Jimboy Martin of 737 and Maymay Entrata of Lucky 7, the 2nd Big Placers such as Jason Gainza of Season 1, Ryan Bang of Teen Clash, Maris Racal of All In and Ylona Garcia of 737, the 3rd Big Placers such as Wendy Valdez of Season 2, Jane Oineza of All In and Yong Muhajil of Lucky 7, the 4th Big Placers such as Gee-Ann Abrahan of Season 2, Will Devaughn of Celebrity 2, Joj and Jai Agpangan of Teen 4, Dawn Chang of 737 and Edward Barber of Lucky 7, and other former housemates including evicted, forcibly evicted, and voluntarily exited such as previous seasons of Pinoy Big Brother. On August 3, the combined result of the Ultim8 Challenge and the public's votes determined the final standing of the Big Otso. At the end of the night of August 3, the 5th to 8th placers exited the show. For August 4, the scores of the Ultim8 Big 4 were reset to zero. At this time, the public's votes alone determined the 4th to 2nd placers, and lastly the Ultim8 Big Winner.

Day 28: Ultim8 Big 4 Total Score
Housemate		Ultim8 Challenge	Public Vote	Total Average	Result
H	Ashley	3%	15.31%	9.16%	7th Big Placer
O	Andre	24%	4.23%	14.12%	Ultim8 Big 4
U	Kaori	5%	7.06%	6.03%	8th Big Placer
S	Kiara	21%	21.86%	21.43%	Ultim8 Big 4
E	Fumiya	11%	8.93%	9.96%	5th Big Placer
M	Yamyam	14%	24.66%	19.33%	Ultim8 Big 4
8	Lou	13%	7.74%	10.37%	Ultim8 Big 4
T	Lie	9%	10.21%	9.60%	6th Big Placer
TOTAL VOTES				100%	—N/a

Day 29: Ultim8 Big Winner Vote
Housemate		Percentage of Votes	Result
B	Kiara	30.29%	2nd Big Placer
I	Andre	2.91%	4th Big Placer
G	Yamyam	58.52%	Ultim8 Big Winner
4	Lou	8.28%	3rd Big Placer
TOTAL VOTES		100%	—N/a

== Official soundtrack ==
Ang Soundtrack Ng Bahay Mo

Soundtrack album by Various artists
- Released: May 12, 2019
- Recorded: 2019
- Genres: OPM, Soundtrack
- Length: 23:25
- Languages: Filipino, Taglish
- Label: Star Music
- Producer: Jonathan Manalo

Star Music together with ABS-CBN created an album for this season entitled Ang Soundtrack Ng Bahay Mo and was released on May 12, 2019.

Ang Soundtrack Ng Teleserye Ng Bahay Mo
No.	Title	Writer(s)	Artists	Length
1.	"Otso Na!"	Jonathan Manalo	Toni Gonzaga, Alex Gonzaga	3:40
2.	"Tayo'y Magsayawan"	Charo Unite, Ernie Dela Pena	Karina, Jelay, Lou, Andre, Yamyam, & Fumiya	2:59
3.	"Gusto Na Kitang Makita"	Chavi Romawac, Hannah Romawac	Andre, Lou, & Karina	3:25
4.	"Ikaw Ang Pinili Ng Puso Ko"	Fumiya, Yamyam	Fumiya & Yamyam	2:54
5.	"You're Makin' Me Kilig"	Shawntel	Shawntel	2:48
6.	"Hi Wala Yan"	Achilles, Gabby	Star Dreamers Batch 1	3:26
7.	"Ikaw At Ako"	Lie, Seth	Star Dreamers Batch 1	4:10
Total length:				23:25

Preceded by Lucky Season 7	Pinoy Big Brother: Otso (November 10, 2018–August 4, 2019)	Succeeded by Connect
