= Fumiya Sankai =

Japanese vlogger

- 三海 郁弥
- Born: March 19, 1995 (age 31); Hamamatsu, Shizuoka, Japan
- Other names: FuMi, Humi
- Occupations: Vlogger; YouTuber; Actor; Recording Artist; Businessman
- Years active: 2015–present
- Agents: S.cot Management (2017–2021); Star Hunt Management (2019–2025) M.S. LAB Inc. (2022–present)
- Height: 170 cm (5 ft 7 in)

YouTube information
- Channel: Fumiya / FumiShun Base
- Years active: 2015–2024
- Genre: Vlog
- Subscribers: 2.31 million
- Views: 111.4 million
- Musical career
- Genres: J-pop; OPM
- Instrument: Vocals
- Years active: 2018–2024
- Labels: Universal Music Japan (2018–2024); Star Music (2019–2024)
- Last updated: July 15, 2024

Fumiya Sankai (三海 郁弥, Sankai Fumiya; born March 19, 1995) is a Japanese vlogger, actor, recording artist and influencer in the Philippines. He has been active in his YouTube Channel, FumiShun Base, since 2015. His fame grew when he became the first full Japanese official housemate in Pinoy Big Brother: Otso, a reality TV show for Filipinos. The "Konnichi-Wonder Vlogger ng Japan", as he is called, Fumiya finished the 9-month running show as the 5th big placer.

In September 2024, Fumiya launched a joint TikTok page with his then-girlfriend, Kate Valdez, called Onigiri Lovers. The former couple also posts vlogs on YouTube, under the same name. However, the page discontinued in February 2026 following their break up announcement.

== Personal life ==
=== 1995 – 2017: Early life and career beginnings ===
Fumiya was born on March 19, 1995, in Hamamatsu Shizuoka Japan. He was raised alongside his three siblings: two brothers named Yuya and Shunya, and one sister named Asami. He is the eldest in their family.

After his high school graduation, Fumiya started living alone in Tokyo while pursuing his degree in Hotel Management.

He joined the hospitality workforce after his graduation from school and worked in a hotel in Ginza as a bell boy. He resigned from his hotel job after two years and decided to pursue his dream of establishing his own clothing line.

He thought that being famous would make his clothes sell faster and one way would be to become famous as a vlogger. He then started making YouTube videos.

=== 2017 – March 2020: Life in the Philippines ===
Having observed their hotel guests, he realized that being able to speak English is important for his business plans. On the 28th day of April 2017, he flew to the Philippines to study English.

He attended the Lyceum of the Philippines in Manila for his English lessons.

He learnt of the PBB audition from his Filipino followers. He attended and documented his audition for his vlog content and he was able to pass all the screenings and became an official PBB OTSO housemate.

After PBB, he stayed in the Philippines to pursue a career in show business.

=== April 2020–present ===
On March 20, 2020, a few days after Metro Manila, Philippines was placed under Enhanced Community Quarantine to prevent the spread of the COVID-19 pandemic, Fumiya travelled back to Japan. Since several cities in Japan were also placed under a State of Emergency and it was also strongly advised for their citizens to stay at home, Fumiya spent majority of his time at his family home in Hamamatsu City Shizuoka.

Fumiya dated Filipino actress Kate Valdez. The pair broke up in 2026.

== Career ==
=== YouTube ===
Fumiya established his YouTube channel, FumiShun Base, with his younger brother, Shunya, on December 2, 2015, but they did not post their first video until September 6, 2016.

While studying in the Philippines, he continued to upload videos in his YouTube channel as a means to update his parents of his whereabouts.

He started uploading YouTube contents for Filipinos on May 31, 2017. His first video was a reaction video of Sarah Geronimo's Kilometro. From then on, he started gaining Filipino subscribers.

In April 2018, his channel hit 100K subscribers awarding him with the YouTube Silver play button. On March 7, 2019, he hit the one million subscribers mark, awarding him with a gold play button.

Some notable vlogs were his song covers of Iñigo Pascual’s Dahil Sayo, Daniel Padilla’s Simpleng Tulad Mo, Juan Karlos’ Buwan, Maja Salvador’s Dahan Dahan, and Ex Battalion's Hayaan Mo Sila which was featured in Rated K.

Other notable vlogs are his auditions to PBB Otso in Araneta Cubao and Cebu.

When the channel started, Japanese was the primary language used in his videos. English subtitles were added since most of his subscribers were Filipinos. After his stint in PBB, he shifted to a mixture of English and Tagalog. Subtitles were no longer added.

This posed a problem for his growing fanbase. With the growing demand from Japanese subscribers, he established the Hiragana FumiShun Base (ふみしゅんべーす) YouTube Channel on April 13, 2020. This channel uses pure Japanese.

The main concept of the main FumiShun Base Channel's content is his exploration of the Filipino culture. When he started being active as an actor, his content shifted to his daily life as a celebrity. The dynamics of the channel shifted and the original flavor was lost. To better categorize his content, he established Fumi (later on renamed Fumi Vlogs / ふみ) on May 17, 2020. On May 25, a week after the launch, the channel has reached 10,000 subscribers.

This channel features a more personal content, leaving his main channel to focus on his exploration to the Filipino culture.

His FumiShun Base channel went back to its original content and the change was felt in the faster rise of subscribers. On June 15, 2020, he hit the 2 million subscribers mark. This was momentous for Fumiya for it is the first time that he was able to celebrate a million subscriber milestone since he was inside the PBB house in his first million.

On May 31, 2024, Sankai, as content creator uploaded a 42-minute "My Last Vlog," announcing his YouTube channel "FumiShun Base" closure to focus on himself as musician instead. His debut single, "BENG," was released on June 12.

=== Business ===
Fumiya's dream was to establish his very own clothing line. Most of his business ventures are aligned to this dream.

Fumiya opened the official shop for his YouTube channel on June 22, 2019. The shop features his original designs from when he started his channel. Items were sold out on the first week.

He also did a collaboration with Livertineage Japan. His designs were released for pre-orders on February 7, 2020.

Fumiya opened FumiShun Base Hamamatsu, his first business venture, on February 16, 2020. The establishment is a museum which exhibits Fumiya's memoirs from his childhood, life as a vlogger, and his life in the Philippines. FumiShun Base merchandise are also being sold.

The earnings of his museum will be used for charity.

On February 29, 2020, in adherence to government policies for the prevention of the spread of the COVID-19 pandemic, the museum was temporarily closed until further notice.

=== Entertainment industry ===
==== Philippines ====
Fumiya was already known as a creator, but his fame rose when he became an official housemate of PBB Otso. He has since been added as a regular cast in a sitcom, Home Sweetie Home: Extra Sweet, and a prime time romantic comedy TV Series, Make It with You.

He has also appeared in several TV and digital programs under ABS-CBN such as Umagang Kay Ganda, It's Showtime, Matanglawin FB Live, iWant’s Tawa Tawa Together, iWant ASAP, and Online Kapamilya Show's Caldero Files. He has also guested in multiple episodes of ASAP, Magandang Buhay, Rated K, Minute to Win It, Gandang Gabi Vice, and Tonight with Boy Abunda. He was also the Myx Celebrity VJ for December 2019.

In April 2020, Fumiya, together with his tandem, Yamyam Gucong have their first show as a host, Highway Harvest, became available through TFC Online.

He has also released several singles under Star Music. Stay With Me this Christmas was at the top spot of the charts on the Christmas week of 2019.

Fumiya held his first major concert (Fumiya Amazing ‘Di Ba?) at the Music Museum on November 15, 2019. His guests included the rest of Team LAYF (with Lou Yanong, Andre Brouillette, and Yamyam Gucong), Jeremy Glinoga, MNL48, AC Bonifacio and Alex Gonzaga.

On May 31, 2024, after releasing his last vlog on his Youtube Channel, he finally reintroduced himself as FuMi, which means "For u, Making impact". His debut single, "BENG", was released on June 12.

As he ventures into a new career part as a musician, he already had several guestings to promote his single, which is released under M.S.L. Music.

On April 11, 2025, Sankai announced via Instagram that he parted ways with Star Hunt Management.

==== Japan ====
Simultaneous to his activities in the Philippines, he has also started being active with his public relations in Japan.

To establish the city's public relations internationally, he was commissioned as the first Yaramaika Ambassador of Hamamatsu City on June 24, 2020.

He has been featured in several newspapers and has appeared in several TV shows in Japan:

Date	TV Show	Network
June 24, 2020	Tadaima TV	TV Shizuoka
February 17, 2020	Tadaima TV	TV Shizuoka
February 6, 2020	Ohayou Nippon	NHK Japan
January 29, 2020	Ohayou Shizuoka	NHK Shizuoka

He has also released several singles under Universal Music Japan. Sige Sige Bahala Na peaked at No. 4 in iTunes Philippines (#1 under the JPop category) and No. 97 in iTunes Singapore when it was released (digital platforms) on August 28, 2019.

== Health ==
Fumiya had an operation in 2015 for a collapsed lung. On December 4, 2019, while he was in Japan, he experienced the same symptoms prompting him to visit a doctor the next day. He was diagnosed again with a collapsed lung. His right lung was smaller due to the air pressure caused by several holes on his lung.

On December 11, 2019, he underwent a surgery to remove the part of his lung with the said holes. The surgery was successful and he stayed in Japan to recover. He returned to the Philippines after 2 and half months of recovery.

== Discography ==
=== Singles ===
==== As FuMi ====
Year	Track	Details
2024	BENG	Release Date (digital platforms): June 12, 2024; Label: M.S.L. Music; YouTube release date: June 12, 2024

==== As Fumiya Sankai ====
Year	Track	Details
2020	Pray	YouTube release date: April 18, 2020
2019	Like A Dreamy Xmas	Release Date (digital platforms): December 6, 2019; Label: Universal Music Japan; YouTube release date: December 18, 2019
2019	Stay With Me this Christmas	First Live Performance: Fumiya Amazing 'Di Ba?, November 15, 2019; Release date (digital platforms): November 19, 2019; Label: Star Music; YouTube release date: November 15, 2019
2019	Ikaw Ang Pinili ng Puso ko	First Live TV Performance: PBB Otso, March 24, 2019; Album: Ang Soundtrack Ng Bahay Mo; Release date (digital platforms): May 12, 2019; Label: Star Music; YouTube release date: June 17, 2019
2018	Sige Sige Bahala Na	Release Date (digital platforms): August 28, 2019; Label: Universal Music Japan; YouTube release date: October 28, 2018
2018	Smilemaker (with Shogo)	YouTube release date: March 10, 2018

== Concerts and Tours ==
- A Beautiful LAYF in Baliwag (November 24, 2019)
- Fumiya Amazing ‘Di Ba? (November 15, 2019)
- Fumiyam in Singapore (October 20, 2019)

== Filmography ==
=== Digital ===
Year	Title	Role	Ref.
2024	BRGY Season 3	Guest	
2021	The FumiYam Show	Host	
2020	Still Connected	Uri	
2020	Legit Bros	Iki	
2020	Caldero Files	Himself	
2020	Highway Harvest	Himself	

=== Film ===
Year	Title	Role	Ref.
2024	Apo Hapon (A Love Story)	Kazuo Toro	
2020	Mang Kepweng: Ang Lihim ng Bandanang Itim	Appear	

=== Television ===
Year	Title	Role	Ref.
2025	TiktoClock	Guest Performer	
2025	All Out Sundays	Guest Performer	
2024	ASAP	Guest	
2024	It's Showtime	Guest Performer	
2024	Kada Umaga	Guest	
2022	Palong Follow	Himself, guest with Yamyam Gucong	
2021	Watashi ga Kemono ni Natta Yoru	Fumiya	
2021	Pinoy Big Brother: Connect	Houseguest	
2020	Make It with You	Yuta Himura	
2019	MYX	Himself (Celebrity VJ)	
2019 - 2020	Tonight with Boy Abunda	Guest	
2019 - 2020	Magandang Buhay	Guest	
2019 - 2020	Home Sweetie Home: Extra Sweet	Hiro Tanahashi	
2019	ASAP	Guest Performer	
2019	Gandang Gabi Vice	Guest	
2019	It's Showtime	Guest Performer	
2019	Minute To Win It: Last Tandem Standing	Celebrity Player	
2019	Pinoy Big Brother: Otso	Himself (Housemate), Proclaimed as 5th Big Placer	

== Accolades ==
Awards, recognitions and nominations received by Sankai.

Year	Award	Category	Notable Work	Result	Ref.
2021	Newsweek	Top 100 Respectable Japanese in the World	FumiShun Base on YouTube	Included	
2020	VP Choice Awards 2020	Most Promising Male Star	himself	Nominated	
2020	MYX Awards 2020	MYX Celebrity VJ of the Year	himself	Nominated	
2020	RAWR Awards 2020	Beshie ng Taon	Make It with You	Won	
2019	33rd PMPC Star Awards for TV	Best New Male TV Personality	Home Sweetie Home	Nominated	
2019	PUSH Awards Year 5	PUSH Newcomer of the Year	himself	Nominated	
2019	RAWR Awards 2019	Newbie of the Year	Home Sweetie Home	Nominated	
