= Yamyam Gucong =

Filipino comedian and actor (born 1993)

- Born: William Goc-ong; December 8, 1993 (age 32); Inabanga, Bohol, Philippines
- Occupations: Comedian; actor
- Years active: 2018–2024
- Agent: ABS-CBN Star Hunt Management (2019–2024) ABS-CBN Star Magic (2022–2024)
- Known for: Pinoy Big Brother Otso Big Winner
- Partner: Elaine Toradio
- Children: 2

YouTube information
- Channel: Yamyam Gucong
- Years active: 2020–present
- Genre: Vlog
- Subscribers: 155 thousand
- Views: 1.49 million
- Last updated: 10 May 2024
- Website: Yamyam Gucong on X Yamyam Gucong on Instagram; Yamyam Gucong on TikTok

William Goc-ong (Tagalog pronunciation: [ˈgukɔŋ]; born December 8, 1993), known professionally as Yamyam Gucong, is a Filipino comedian and actor known for winning the Philippine reality television series, Pinoy Big Brother: Otso.

== Early life ==
Yamyam was born on December 8, 1993, in Brgy. Anonang in the town of Inabanga, Bohol, Philippines. Before winning Pinoy Big Brother: Otso, he stopped pursuing education at fifth grade to sustain his family's financial needs. He worked several jobs in Cebu such as a water-delivery man and as a house help. On August 12, 2018, Gucong auditioned as an adult housemate in the reality show Pinoy Big Brother: Otso. He later landed a spot as a housemate on January 8, 2019, and eventually became the show's big winner.

== Career ==
After their temporary exit, Yamyam appeared on several mall shows, and guested several ABS-CBN shows. He was also cast in a supporting role in the Filipino sit-com Home Sweetie Home. In May 2019, Gucong appeared on the Pinoy Big Brother: Otso album entitled "Ang Soundtrack ng Bahay Mo" on the track "Ikaw Ang Pinili ng Puso Ko" alongside his fellow batchmate, Fumiya Sankai.

After PBB, Yamyam appeared in several TV Shows of ABS-CBN, including his first dramatic acting stint in Maalaala Mo Kaya, episode entitled "Bukid", which showed his life story prior to his PBB stint. He starred alongside veteran actors, Lito Pimentel and Glenda Garcia; and ex-PBB housemates Yong Muhajil, Banjo Dangalan and Wealand Ferrer with Karen Reyes portraying the role of his girlfriend, Elaine while Onyok Pineda portraying younger Yamyam. The episode received a good feedback from viewers, and trended in the Philippines and Worldwide.

In 2020, he hosted an online digital show, "Tipid Nation", which was aired on ABS-CBN YouTube channel and ABS-CBN Facebook Page produced by TVDG. This digital show gives advices on how we can save money on such situations, such as buying new clothes for Job Interviews and Street food Hacks.

He was also hosting a travel digital show in TFC Online, entitled "Highway Harvest", along with his friend and ex-PBB housemate, Fumiya Sankai. This show premiered on April 9, 2020, and is one of the most viewed shows in TFC Online.

He is also included in an Online show entitled "Usapang Lalaki" every 12nn in Star Hunt Kumu account. This is together with Argel Saycon and discusses various topics related to men.

He was also cast in 2020 MMFF entry, "Mang Kepweng: Ang Lihim ng Bandanang Itim". This is also his first movie in his entire showbiz career.

He is also cast in the IWantTFC Series "Hoy, Love You!" together with Joross Gamboa and Roxanne Guinoo, and ex-PBB OTSO housemates Karina Bautista and Aljon Mendoza.

After 5 years since PBB Otso, Gucong decided not to renew his contract with Star Magic, making him a freelance artist. He is now accepting acting projects that is closer to his home. He also landed a lead role in the movie "Beauty and Bert" as Bert, a college student who has love interest Beauty, a famous girl in school.

== Personal life ==
After PBB, he got his condominium unit prize, which is sponsored by Suntrust.

He also built his own bakeshop business named "Yamito's Bakeshop". He used his prize money to invest in it. The first branch of the bakeshop, which is located in his hometown in Inabanga opened on December 8, 2019, which coincided on his 26th birthday. After few months, he opened another branch in Ubay, Bohol last March 8, 2020.

Gucong had been in a relationship with Elaine Toradio, his non-showbiz girlfriend, where he proposed to her in October 2021. It was revealed in December 2021 that he was to have a child with Toradio, to which they welcomed a baby daughter on February 21, 2022.

== Filmography ==
=== Television ===
Year	Title	Role	Remarks	Ref
2024	Konnichiwa Manila	Host/Himself	Aired from May 12, 2024, to May 26, 2024	
2023	Can't Buy Me Love	Brian	Guest Role	
2023	The Chosen One: Kakatacute	Morgan Solis	Player	
2022	Hoy, Love You! Season 3	Bart	Support Role	
2022	Palong Follow	Himself	Guest with Fumiya Sankai	
2021	Hoy, Love You! Season 1 and Season 2	Bart	Support Role	
2021	Pinoy Big Brother: Connect	Houseguest	Houseguest with Fumiya Sankai for PPop Weekly Task	
2020	Paano Kita Mapasasalamatan	Elmer	Guest Role: Elmer Padilla Story	
2020	Team FitFil	Guest	Guest with Team LAYF	
2020	Matanglawin	Guest	Guest for 12th Anniversary Episode (March 1, 2020, episode)	
2020	Umagang Kay Ganda	Guest	Matira Machika segment (February 20, 2020, episode)	
2019-2020	Home Sweetie Home: Extra Sweet	Bogs	First TV appearance; Supporting role	
2019-2020	Magandang Buhay	Guest	Guest in various episodes	
2019	Myx	Celebrity VJ	Guest Celebrity VJ for December 2019 with Fumiya Sankai	
2019	Maalaala Mo Kaya: Bukid	Himself	First dramatic acting debut stint; Acting his life story	
2019	Minute To Win It: Last Tandem Standing	Celebrity Player	Tandem Player with Fumiya Sankai (May 14, 2019, and September 6, 2019, episodes)	
2019	ASAP	Guest Performer	Performed with Team LAYF and Ultimate Big 4	
2019	Banana Sundae	Guest Performer	Performed with Ultimate Big 4	
2019	It's Showtime	Guest Performer	Performed with Fumiya Sankai	
2019	Gandang Gabi Vice	Guest	Guest with Lou, Andre and Fumiya	
2019	Tonight with Boy Abunda	Guest	Guest on various episodes	
2019	Pinoy Big Brother: Otso	Housemate	Himself; Later proclaimed as Ultim8 Big Winner	
2018	Star Hunt: The Grand Kapamilya Audition	Auditionee	Audition for PBB Otso	

=== Digital ===
Year	Title	Role	Remarks	Ref
2021	The FumiYam Show	Host		
2020	Still Connected	Hector	Pilikula Serye produced by TVDG	
2020	Legit Bros	Buboy	LazSerye Premiered on Sept. 8; Co-Produced with TVDG and LazadaPH	
2020	Usapang Lalaki	Host/ Himself	Produced by Star Hunt, segment hosted together with Argel Saycon	
2020	Highway Harvest	Host/Himself	Produced by TFC, together with Fumiya Sankai	
2020	Tipid Nation	Host/Himself	Produced by ABS-CBN TVDG	
2019	IWant ASAP	Guest Performer	Performed with Fumiya and Ultim8 Big 4	

=== Film ===
Year	Title	Role	Notes	Ref
2024	Beauty and Bert	Bert	Produced by Bisayaflix	
2020	Mang Kepweng: Ang Lihim ng Bandanang Itim	Disappear	Official Entry to 2020 Metro Manila Film Festival	

== Discography ==
=== Singles ===
Year	Track	Details
2019	Ikaw Ang Pinili ng Puso ko (with Fumiya Sankai)	First Live TV Performance: PBB Otso, March 24, 2019; Album: Ang Soundtrack Ng Bahay Mo; Release date (digital platforms): May 12, 2019; Label: Star Music; YouTube release date: June 17, 2019

== Concerts and Tours ==
- FumiYam in Singapore (October 20, 2019)
- Fumiya Amazing ‘Di Ba? (as guest with Lou Yanong and Andre Brouillette) (November 15, 2019)
- A Beautiful LAYF in Baliwag (November 24, 2019)

== Awards and nomination ==
Year	Award	Show	Category	Result	Ref
2020	Star Hunt Awards 2020	PILIKULA: Still Connected	Best PILI-kula	Won	
2020	Star Hunt Awards 2020	PILIKULA: Still Connected	Best PILI-kula Actor	Nominated	
2020	Star Hunt Awards 2020	Usapang Lalaki	Best Program Host (with Argel Saycon)	Nominated	
2020	RAWR Awards 2020		Fans Club of the Year (for FumiYam)	Nominated	
2020	Myx Awards 2020	Myx	MYX Celebrity VJ Of the Year (with Fumiya Sankai)	Nominated	
2020	VP Choice Awards 2020	N/A	Most Promising Male Star	Nominated	
2019	33rd PMPC Star Awards for Television	Home Sweetie Home: Extra Sweet	Best New Male TV Personality	Nominated	
2019	RAWR Awards 2019	Home Sweetie Home: Extra Sweet	Newbie of the Year (with Fumiya Sankai) Fans Club of the Year (for FumiYam)	Nominated	

Preceded by Maymay Entrata	Pinoy Big Brother; Big Winner; 2018	Succeeded by Liofer Pinatacan
Preceded by Miho Nishida	Pinoy Big Brother Regular Season; Big Winner; 2018	Succeeded by Liofer Pinatacan
