= Connected (2022 film) =

2022 Filipino romantic comedy film

- Official release poster
- Directed by: Theodore Boborol
- Written by: Mary Rose Colindres
- Produced by: Carlo Katigbak; Cory Vidanes; Laurenti Dyogi
- Starring: Kobie Brown; Andi Abaya; Ralph Malibunas; Gail Banawis; Chico Alicaya; Amanda Zamora; Richard Juan
- Edited by: Alexces Megan Abarquez-Baliao
- Music by: Jessie Lasaten
- Production company: Star Magic Studios
- Distributed by: CineXpress
- Release date: July 22, 2022
- Running time: 1 hour 30 minutes
- Country: Philippines
- Languages: Filipino, English

Connected is a 2022 Filipino youth-oriented romantic comedy film directed by Theodore Boborol, starring former Pinoy Big Brother: Connect housemates Kobie Brown, Andi Abaya, Ralph Malibunas, Gail Banawis, Chico Alicaya, Amanda Zamora, and PBB co-host Richard Juan as they navigate all their different personalities while finding a sense of purpose, love, attention, and the struggle to combat feelings of isolation in a connected world.

It is also the first movie produced by Star Magic Studios, serving as the newly-formed studio's realization of its vision to produce movies that will showcase its artists' talents in the most perfect yet challenging roles for them.

== Premise ==
With a desire to connect to something "greater than themselves," three different stories from Gen Z or Zoomers are formed because of a connection by a café which prohibits them from using social media and their gadgets, and faced and felt the agony and pleasure of being in love.

== Cast ==
=== Main cast ===
- Kobie Brown as Topher
- Andi Abaya as Gabbie
- Ralph Malibunas as Gen
- Gail Banawis as Fin
- Chico Alicaya as Rocky
- Amanda Zamora as Sandy
- Richard Juan as Sky

=== Supporting cast ===
- Peewee O' Hara as Yayay Juaning
- Justin Cuyugan as Lorenz Toledo
- Che Ramos-Cosio as Mira Toledo
- Marife Necesito as Gabbie's mother
- Jonic Magno as Gabbie's father
- Skyzx Labastilla as Gen's mother
- Russu Laurente as Paul

== Production ==
According to Star Magic and ABS-CBN Entertainment Production Head Laurenti Dyogi, Star Magic Studios is one of the exciting plans for Star Magic’s 30th year anniversary, with this being the maiden offering of the new film sub-company.

=== Casting ===
It was revealed that Brown, Abaya, Malibunas, Banawis, Alicaya, Zamora, and Juan were handpicked by Dyogi himself to star in the movie, and is considered the group's first starring roles in a film.

== Release ==
Connected was released worldwide on July 22, 2022, via iWantTFC, KTX.ph, SKY Pay-Per-View, and TFC IPTV.

=== Theatrical ===
The movie had its theatrical release on the same day of its worldwide release, with Boborol and the main cast except Abaya and Banawis gracing the red carpet event. The event was also attended by Dyogi, and some former Pinoy Big Brother housemates from previous seasons.

=== Marketing ===
The movie's full trailer was released on June 24, 2022, on ABS-CBN Entertainment's social media accounts.

== Critical response ==
Fred Hawson, writing for KTX.ph, described writer Mary Rose Colindres's concept as "(woving) three stories of young love into the mix," and who "was also able to weave in a little detail about a lost pin with a motivational message which worked its magic with everyone, and this was very ingenious." Hawson also went on to describe Abaya and Alicaya as showing "the most promise so far" among the six neophyte actors.
