= Theodore Boborol =

Filipino film and television director

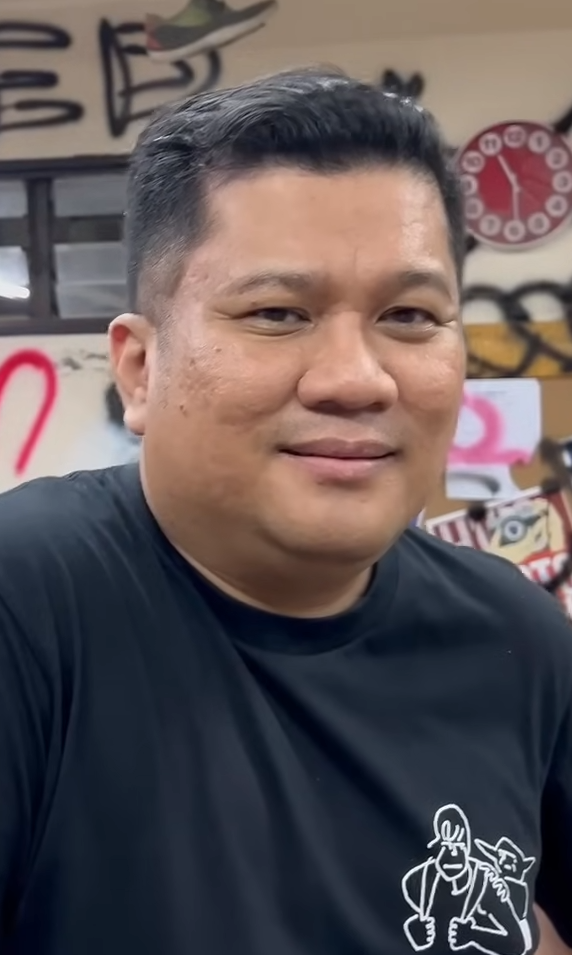
- Born: Theodore Capistrano Boborol; December 19, 1979 (age 46); Dapitan, Philippines
- Other name: Ted Boborol
- Education: Silliman University High School; University of the Philippines Diliman
- Occupations: Director, screenwriter
- Years active: 2000–present
- Known for: Finally Found Someone; Vince and Kath and James; Just the Way You Are; Be My Lady; Angelito: Batang Ama; Annaliza; Sparks Camp; Ang Mutya ng Section E The Chambermaid's Daughter

Theodore Capistrano Boborol (born December 19, 1979) is a Filipino film and television director who started as a creative researcher for Star Cinema in 2000. Boborol made his directorial debut with the teen romantic comedy-drama film Just the Way You Are (2015). He rose to prominence for directing his second feature film, Vince and Kath and James (2016), which was a commercial and critical success. His third film Finally Found Someone, is one of the highest-grossing films of 2017 in the Philippines.

Boborol is also the director of the first queer dating reality series in the Philippines, Sparks Camp (2023), and the award-winning independent film Iska (2019).

== Early life ==
Theodore Capistrano Boborol was born in Dapitan, Zamboanga del Norte, Philippines. His mother, Zenaida Capistrano Boborol, was a high school teacher, and his father, Tomas Adaza Boborol, was a state auditor.

Boborol finished high school at Silliman University High School and graduated cum laude from the University of the Philippines-Diliman with a Bachelor of Arts in Broadcast Communication. He took a film directing course under National Artist for Film Marilou Diaz-Abaya as a scholar of Star Cinema.

== Career ==
Boborol directed many teleseryes for ABS-CBN, including Angelito: Batang Ama (2012), the hit remake of Annaliza (2013), and Be My Lady (2015), which was awarded Best Drama Series during the 38th Catholic Mass Media Awards. Boborol was also the national winner in the Philippines for Best Direction at the Asian Academy Creative Awards 2018 for his work in the soap opera Araw Gabi (2018).

He directed the hit drama series Ang Mutya ng Section E.

== Filmography ==
=== Film ===
Year	Title	Associated Film Outfit	Lead Stars	Notes
2015	Just The Way You Are	Star Cinema	Enrique Gil, Liza Soberano	
2016	Vince and Kath and James	Star Cinema	Julia Barretto, Joshua Garcia, Ronnie Alonte	2016 Metro Manila Film Festival; Children's Choice Award (Winner)
2017	Finally Found Someone	Star Cinema, VIVA Films	Sarah Geronimo, John Lloyd Cruz, Christian Bables	
2019	Iska	Firestarters Productions, Uncle Scott Global Productions, Central Digital Lab, Cinemalaya Film Foundation	Ruby Ruiz	2019 Cinemalaya Philippine Independent Film Festival
2020	James & Pat & Dave	Star Cinema	Ronnie Alonte, Loisa Andalio and Donny Pangilinan	
2022	Connected	Star Magic Studios	Kobie Brown, Andi Abaya, Ralph Malibunas, Gail Banawis, Chico Alicaya, Amanda Zamora and Richard Juan	
2022	The Entitled	TinCan Productions, Netflix	Alex Gonzaga, JC de Vera and Ara Mina	

=== Television ===
Year	Title	Role	Notes
2010-2011	Precious Hearts Romances Presents: “Kristine”	Director	53 episodes
2011	Mana Po	Director	30 episodes
2011	Good Vibes	Director	22 episodes
2011-2012	Angelito: Batang Ama	Director	108 episodes
2012	Precious Hearts Romances Presents: “Hiyas”	Director	34 episodes
2012	Oka2kat	Director	3 episodes
2012	Precious Hearts Romances Presents: “Pintada”	Director	13 episodes
2012	Angelito: Ang Bagong Yugto	Director	110 episodes
2013	Be Careful With My Heart	Director	71 episodes 27th PMPC Star Awards for TV Best Daytime Drama Series
2013	Maalala Mo Kaya: "Bahay"	Director	Aired February 2013
2013	Maalala Mo Kaya: "Krus"	Director	Aired March 2013
2013	Annaliza	Director	
2014	It's Showtime Lenten Special: “Charlie Fry Story”	Director	Aired April 2014
2014	Maalala Mo Kaya: "Panyo"	Director	Aired May 2014
2014	Ipaglaban Mo!, "Nang Dahil Sa Utang"	Director	Aired July 2014
2014	Forevermore	Second Unit Director	
2014	Ipaglaban Mo!, "Nasa Maling Landas"	Director	Aired January 2015
2015	Maalala Mo Kaya: "Picture"	Director	Aired July 2015
2015	Ipaglaban Mo!, "Pagmamahalang Hinadlangan"	Director	Aired August 2015
2016	Be My Lady	Director	2016 Catholic Mass Media Award for Best Drama Series/Program
2017	Maalala Mo Kaya: "Red Watch"	Director	Aired February 11, 2017
2017	Ipaglaban Mo!, "Laro"	Director	Aired February 18, 2017
2017	Ipaglaban Mo!, "Groufie"	Director	Aired October 14, 2017
2017	Maalala Mo Kaya: "Kidney"	Director	Aired December 9, 2017
2018	Precious Hearts Romances Presents: “Araw Gabi”	Director	
2019	Maalala Mo Kaya: "Journal"	Director	
2019	Taiwan That You Love	Director	
2019	Maalala Mo Kaya: "Salamin"	Director	
2020	Make It with You	Director	
2021	Hoy, Love You!	Director	
2023	The Rain In España	Director	
2025	Maalala Mo Kaya: "Apoy"	Director	
2025	Ang Mutya ng Section E	Director	
2025	Ghosting	Director	

=== Reality Television ===
Year	Title	Role	Notes
2023 - 2026	Sparks Camp	Director	Seasons 1 - 4

=== Vertical Series ===
Year	Title	Role	Notes
2026	The Chambermaid's Daughter	Director	Seasons 1- 2
2026	BGYO: Vertical on Demand	Director	4 episodes
	Coach Me Maybe	Director	30 episodes

== Awards and nominations ==
Award	Category	Year	Title	Result
Asian Academy Creative Awards (AAA's 2018)	National Winner (Philippines): Best Direction (Fiction)	2018	Araw Gabi	Won

== See also ==
- ABS-CBN
- Star Cinema
