= Love in 40 Days =

2022 Philippine television romantic comedy drama series

- Title card
- Genre: Drama; Romantic comedy Christian drama Fantasy
- Written by: Genesis Rodriguez; Abi Lam Parayno; Camille de la Cruz; Wilbert Christian Tan
- Directed by: Emmanuel Q. Palo; Jojo A. Saguin
- Starring: Loisa Andalio; Ronnie Alonte
- Music by: Francis Concio
- Composer: Jonathan Manalo
- Country of origin: Philippines
- Original language: Filipino
- No. of episodes: 110 (list of episodes)

Production
- Executive producers: Carlo Katigbak; Cory Vidanes; Laurenti Dyogi; Roldeo Endrinal
- Producers: Rondel Lindayag; Joel Mercado; Erick Castillo Salud; Jemila Jimenez
- Production location: Metro Manila
- Editors: Jay Mendoza; Zara Terrado-Vidallo; Ray Ann Kristelle Endaya-Reyes
- Running time: 18–30 minutes
- Production company: Dreamscape Entertainment

Original release
- Network: Kapamilya Channel (Note: The series was simulcast on A2Z, TV5, Jeepney TV and The Filipino Channel. It was also available on-demand via iWantTFC.)
- Release: May 30 – October 28, 2022

Related
- Mga Anghel na Walang Langit; May Bukas Pa; Agua Bendita; Momay; 100 Days to Heaven; Dahil sa Pag-ibig; Nathaniel; Huwag Kang Mangamba

Love in 40 Days is a Philippine television drama romance series broadcast by Kapamilya Channel. Directed by Emmanuel Q. Palo and Jojo A. Saguin, it stars Loisa Andalio and Ronnie Alonte. It aired on the network's Primetime Bida line up and worldwide on TFC from May 30 to October 28, 2022.

== Premise ==
Jane (Loisa Andalio) is a successful insurance agent who provides for her family's needs. Her perfect life ends in a car accident and becomes a ghost. Jane arrives in Evergreen Mansion, a transitory place in the afterlife where souls settle within 40 days before they can enter heaven or hell. She meets Edward (Ronnie Alonte), a musician and son of a funeral home director, whose third eye was opened due to an accident and he begins to see ghosts.

As Jane slowly accepts her fate, her plans are thwarted by Edward who wants to expel all the ghosts in the mansion to build a resto-bar for himself and his band. Jane refuses to let Edward succeed by befriending him in an attempt to convince him not to remodel the mansion. However, things become complicated when Edward realizes that Jane is a ghost, and they gradually develop feelings for each other, all while their respective families' problems clash and the people around them try to figure out the connection between the two.

== Cast and characters ==
Main cast

- Loisa Andalio as Jane Marasigan
  - Hannah Balahadia as young Jane
- Ronnie Alonte as Edward Montemayor / Nathaniel Rosal

Supporting cast

- Leo Martinez as Patricio Guzman
- Janice de Belen as Ofelia Abanilla / Jocelyn "Josie" Rosal
  - Kaila Estrada as young Ofelia/Josie
- Mylene Dizon as Andrea Buena-Montemayor / Ma. Cristina Ocampo
  - Mary Joy Apostol as young Andrea/Ma. Cristina
- Lotlot de Leon as Diana Perez
- Maria Isabel Lopez as Roberta "Berta" Ignacio
- William Lorenzo as Jesus "Jessie" Marasigan
- Ana Abad Santos as Susan Agoncillo-Marasigan
- Bart Guingona as Robert Montemayor
  - Zach Castañeda as young Robert
- Ahron Villena as Marco Peñaflor
- Chie Filomeno as Eileen Montemayor
- Trina "Hopia" Legaspi as Alice Samonte
- Vaughn Piczon as Elias Soliman
- Raven Molina as Robbie Montano
- Roy Victor Padilla as Derek
- Renshi de Guzman as Kokoy Ignacio
- Josh de Guzman as Ramon "Monmon" Marasigan
- Andi Abaya as Celine de Vera
- Kobie Brown as Brock Reynolds
- Benedix Ramos as George Casimiro
- Zabel Lamberth as Valerie Marasigan
  - Hannah Lopez Vito as young Valerie

Guest cast

- Aleck Bovick as Sylvia Marasigan
- Allan Paule as Anton Velasquez
  - Miggy Campbell as young Anton
- Angie Castrence as Karina Guzman
  - Bea Borres as young Karina
- Chard Ocampo as Pol
- Ian Pangilinan as Jeff
- Justine Rivera as Kyle

== Production ==
=== Filming ===
Filming began in late January 2022.

=== Casting ===
Casting for the drama include former housemates from Pinoy Big Brother: Andi Abaya and Kobie Brown from Connect, and Chie Filomeno and Benedix Ramos from Kumunity Season 10. Filomeno's participation was confirmed during a script reading session in November 2021.

=== Marketing ===
A teaser was released on April 26, 2022. The full trailer was released on May 5, 2022.

=== Music ===
Love In 40 Days (Official Soundtrack)

Soundtrack album by Various artists
- Released: June 3, 2022
- Recorded: 2022
- Genre: OPM, Pop, Soundtrack
- Length: 20:52
- Language: Filipino
- Label: StarPop
- Producer: Jonathan Manalo; Roque "Rox" Santos

On June 3, 2022, Star Music through its sub-label StarPop released the official soundtrack of the series. Most tracks are composed by Jonathan Manalo and Rox Santos, with BoybandPH's Ford Valencia performing a rendition of Say Alonzo and Sam Milby's 2005 original song "Magmahal Muli", and Jeremy G performing both solo and duet (with Angela Ken) renditions of Daniel Padilla's "Sabay Natin".

== Re-run ==
The series re-aired on Jeepney TV and All TV from May 18 to September 7, 2024.

== Episodes ==
Season	Episodes	Originally released	
Season	Episodes	First released	Last released
1	110	May 30, 2022	October 28, 2022
