= List of Love in 40 Days episodes =

Love in 40 Days is a Philippine fantasy romantic comedy television series broadcast by Kapamilya Channel. It aired on the network's Primetime Bida evening block, Jeepney TV, A2Z Primetime, TV5's TodoMax Primetime Singko and worldwide via The Filipino Channel from May 30, 2022, to October 28, 2022, replacing Meow, The Secret Boy and it was replaced by Ever Night: War of Brilliant Splendours on October 31, 2022.

== Series overview ==
Season	Episodes	Originally released	
Season	Episodes	First released	Last released
1	110	May 30, 2022	October 28, 2022

== Episodes ==
No.	Title	TV title	Original release date (Note: iWantTFC streams two episodes first in advance before its television broadcast.)	AGB Nielsen Ratings (NUTAM People)
1	"Not Your Plain Jane"	"First Day"	May 30, 2022	3.2%
Competitive Jane receives a prestigious award from her company, but her euphoria is cut short by an unexpected breakup. To worsen the situation, she gets a threatening letter from an anonymous sender.
2	"Meet Edward"	"Evergreen Mansion"	May 31, 2022	3.1%
Jane gets into a heated argument with Alice and Monmon on her birthday, only for it to turn out as an eye-opener. Not wanting to give up on his dreams, Edward thinks of a way to support his band's future.
3	"Welcome to the Evergreen Mansion"	"Multo"	June 1, 2022	3.0%
Jane storms out of the Evergreen Mansion after its staff failed to meet her many demands. Still unaware of the tragic fate she suffered, Jane decides to go home. Edward, along with his bandmates, inspect an abandoned house for his business venture.
4	"The Life After Life"	"My Family"	June 2, 2022	3.0%
Jane learns that she is left with 40 days to bid farewell to her loved ones. Amid constant competition with Eileen for his parents' attention, Edward pushes through with his business plan, inciting unrest among the Evergreen Mansion's staff.
5	"Two Worlds Become One"	"Unfinished Business"	June 3, 2022	2.7%
Thinking that she is finally ready, Jane attempts to cross over to the afterlife. However, an unfinished business prevents her from departing the world of the living. Jane throws a fit, leading to an unexpected reunion with a familiar face.
6	"The Haunt Begins"	"Problema"	June 6, 2022	3.4%
Jane learns why Edward sees her yet fails to see the beauty of the place they are in. The staff at Evergreen Mansion tries using their powers in a bid to protect their sanctuary.
7	"Reversed Play Dead"	"Deal"	June 7, 2022	2.7%
Edward remains adamant about constructing his resto-bar in the abandoned house despite the spooky stuff his friends are noticing. Jane reaches a deal with Patricio after coming up with a way to protect Evergreen Mansion.
8	"Cold Body vs. Cold Heart"	"Pangarap"	June 8, 2022	2.4%
Jane pretends to be a real estate broker as she tries convincing Edward to abort his business plans. Soon, the desperate ghost learns about the motivation behind the musician's unwavering resolve to reach his dreams.
9	"Jane's Heart Beats Again"	"Memorial Plan"	June 9, 2022	2.7%
Jane begins to see Edward in a new light as she slowly learns about his dreams and family issues. Because of this, the wandering spirit comes up with a plan to gain the rebellious scion's favor.
10	"A Date with the Dead"	"The Date"	June 10, 2022	2.1%
Marco remains adamant in protecting his secret. Despite Diana's reservation to Jane's plan, the ghosts of Evergreen Mansion offer their help as the former insurance agent goes on a date with Edward.
11	"The Ensemble Act"	"Break Up"	June 13, 2022	2.4%
Enraged by pain and jealousy, Valerie decides to end her relationship with Edward. Jane, on the other hand, sees the breakup as a good opportunity to accomplish her mission.
12	"The Lifeline Band"	"Lifeline Bar"	June 14, 2022	2.7%
Jane grows worried as Edward inches closer to converting Evergreen Mansion into a bar. Soon, the aspiring musician gets floored upon experiencing eerie occurrences at Mr. Tiu's wake.
13	"Fearsome Encounters"	"Compromise"	June 15, 2022	2.6%
After helping Mr. Tiu, Edward begins having fearsome encounters with restless souls. Convinced by Jane that these are all hallucinations, Edward commits a costly mistake. The Evergreen Mansion staff notices Jane's growing fondness for the musician.
14	"The Great Pretender"	"The Truth"	June 16, 2022	2.0%
Jane helps Edward resolve his conflict with his parents, only to find herself at wit's end as he continues to reject her demands. Things take a turn for the worse when her newfound friend meets Valerie's broker.
15	"Unwanted"	"Paalisin"	June 17, 2022	2.5%
Jane is left with no choice but to come clean to Edward about her real identity and intentions. Despite her nephew's hesitation, Berta tries to reunite Monmon with his estranged father.
16	"Rest In Peace?"	"Drain"	June 20, 2022	2.2%
Jane and the staff at Evergreen Mansion race against time as they pull out all the stops to prevent the psychic from expelling them. Valerie comes up with a sinister plan to derail the opening of Edward's bar.
17	"Jump Scare"	"Soft Opening"	June 21, 2022	2.8%
Just when they thought of that they had finally expelled the persistent ghosts, Edward and his friends excitedly prepare for Lifeline Bar's soft opening. However, the band's first performance is cut short by hair-raising occurrences.
18	"Bitter Reunion"	"Sumbong"	June 22, 2022	2.5%
Jane wallows in bitterness and anger upon confirming that Jessie still does not care about her and Sylvia. Ofelia finds herself on the receiving end of Andrea's anger after Eileen revealed Edward's secret.
19	"Disbanded"	"Guilt Trip"	June 23, 2022	3.0%
When her attempt to cross over to the afterlife fails anew, Jane agrees with Patricio's suggestion on what needs to be done. The troubled spirit soon witnesses Valerie's desperate effort to win Edward back.
20	"The More You Hate…"	"Mag-alala"	June 24, 2022	2.0%
Despite their differences and constant bickering, a worried Jane pays Edward a visit, only to walk in on him in a compromising situation. Meanwhile, Alice and Robbie start investigating a case that Jane used to handle before she died,
21	"Bar Turned Horror House"	"Backfire"	June 27, 2022	2.8%
Celine and Brock get into a heated argument as they continue to blame each other for their untimely demise. The Evergreen Mansion staff's plan to sabotage Edward's gig backfires when their antics work in Lifeline Bar's favor.
22	"The Bargain"	"Negotiate"	June 28, 2022	2.4%
Ofelia is taken aback upon the sudden arrival of a person from her past. Needing the ghosts' help in his future gigs, Edward attempts to negotiate with Patricio.
23	"Hotheaded, Warmhearted"	"Cooperate"	June 29, 2022	2.3%
Valerie tries to make up with her beloved, only to be confronted for sabotaging Lifeline Bar. Edward and his friends play their hearts out after Patricio agreed to cooperate with their gimmick in exchange for helping Jane.
24	"Truce"	"Truce"	June 30, 2022	1.9%
After earning Robert's approval, Edward brims with joy upon hearing his sing on the radio. Keeping his side of the bargain, he begins to help Jane find ways to communicate with Jessie.
25	"The Link"	"Connection"	July 1, 2022	2.2%
Edward overcomes his trauma when he drives Monmon to the hospital. After helping Jane communicate with her brother, Edward sneaks into her house to retrieve an important envelope. However, someone gets in his way and tries to steal it from him.
26	"Locked Up"	"Magnanakaw"	July 4, 2022	2.0%
Despite getting into serious trouble, Edward decides to push through with his mission to help Jane. Alice grows suspicious upon learning about the disappearance of the private investigator assigned to her late friend's case.
27	"Half Sisters"	"Half Sister"	July 5, 2022	2.0%
Edward opens up about a dark incident in his past. Jane gets shocked upon seeing a familiar face in her father's house. Meanwhile, Robert loses his cool as Andrea seems to remain unsympathetic toward their son's situation.
28	"Illegitimate"	"Devastated"	July 6, 2022	2.0%
Valerie resorts to a threat in a bid to prevent Jessie from reconnecting with Monmon. Edward tries to encourage a devastated Jane when a shocking truth ignites her anger toward her estranged father.
29	"Patching Things Up"	"Making Amends"	July 7, 2022	2.2%
After seeing Edward happy being with Andrea, Celine still feels sad for herself. Meanwhile, Jane learns about Diana's baggage as a mother. By evening, after Brock sought for his help, Edward showed Celine a video of her mother and became emotional seeing her mother remembering her love for sewing, leading to Celine to settle her rift with Brock.
30	"The Lost Soul"	"The Lost Soul"	July 8, 2022	2.3%
Much to Elias' irritation, Patricio chooses to help Edward instead of reprimanding him for circumventing their rules. Upon learning that Dado turned into a lost soul, the aspiring musician weeps as he tries to jog his late driver's memory.
31	"A Soul's Judgement"	"Clear"	July 11, 2022	2.1%
Upon witnessing Dado's fate, Jane learns that the heavens will weigh her good and bad deeds on Earth when she finally crosses over. While Robert expresses his desire to fix his family's problems, Ofelia panics upon receiving a surprise visit.
32	"Edward's Happy Day"	"Happy Day"	July 12, 2022	1.6%
Edward feels happy and content seeing a smooth relationship with his parents and having settled his problems with Mang Dado. By night, Jane spends the night cheering Edward up, strengthening the bond between the ghost and the living man. Eventually, Brock proposed to marry Celine, to which she accepted with joy and were congratulated by Jane and George.
33	"Daydreaming"	"Falling In Love"	July 13, 2022	2.3%
As Celine and Brock have taken their relationship to a new level, Edward and Jane have started to fall in love with each other slowly. Meanwhile, Valerie has put together the clues upon seeing Edward seemingly talking to his ghost friend.
34	"The Caveat"	"Nararamdaman"	July 14, 2022	2.1%
Armed with Ofelia's love advice, Edward musters his courage to confess his feelings to Jane in front of a jealous Valerie. Ofelia, meanwhile, finds herself in a tight spot when Anton blackmails her.
35	"Conspiracy"	"Conspiracy"	July 15, 2022	1.9%
Hearing about the strange death of a high-profile person, Alice notices something amiss as she looks into the files of some of Zion's clients. Jane is consumed with rage upon witnessing Jessie's cowardly move.
36	"Mad Soul"	"Galit"	July 18, 2022	2.2%
Filled with rage, Jane lashes out and spews hurtful words at the souls that want nothing but to help her. Ofelia recalls a moment in her dark past as she counts the sum of money she needs to silence Anton.
37	"Lost Daughter"	"Lost Daughter"	July 19, 2022	2.0%
Alice grows suspicious of Marco upon confirming that Heaven's Gate is set to handle the wake of another one of Zion's high-profile clients. In a bid to make up for her misbehavior, Jane asks Edward for help in finding Patricio's estranged daughter.
38	"Cold Feet"	"Alinlangan"	July 20, 2022	2.3%
Upon figuring out a way to patch things up with Patricio, Jane attempts to go to the afterlife anew. Alice senses an under-the-table deal involving Marco and Heaven's Gate.
39	"Jane Stays"	"Stay"	July 21, 2022	2.5%
With just 14 days left, Jane resolves to spend her remaining time with her loved ones instead. As Berta and Jessie try to determine Edward's connection with Jane, Kokoy finds himself in danger.
40	"Big Break"	"Big Break"	July 22, 2022	2.5%
Edward earns the recognition and the full support of his parents upon receiving a call from a bigtime record producer, making Eileen more jealous of the attention her brother is getting.
41	"A Double Celebration"	"Birthday"	July 25, 2022	2.0%
Edward decides to celebrate his and Jane's birthdays together as a way to replace the bad memories they associated with them. Valerie flips upon witnessing her ex-boyfriend serenading a ghost.
42	"Alice Vs. Marco"	"Tension"	July 26, 2022	1.6%
Patricio resolves to stop helping Edward as Lifeline Bar's growing popularity puts Evergreen Mansion in a precarious situation. After getting veiled threats from Marco, Alice receives an anonymous cryptic message.
43	"Connivance"	"Envelope"	July 27, 2022	2.1%
Alice and Robbie obtain an important evidence as their suspicions about Marco intensify. Claiming that she is concerned for Edward, Valerie tries to connive with Eileen in exposing her ex-boyfriend's alleged mental instability.
44	"Not So Happy Birthday"	"Gulo"	July 28, 2022	2.1%
Edward brims with joy as he celebrates his birthday with his loved ones until Eileen shows the video that Valerie took. Back in Evergreen Mansion, Jane tries her best to change Patricio's decision.
45	"Banished"	"Banished"	July 29, 2022	2.0%
Believing that their son is having a mental disorder relapse, Robert and Andrea begin considering sending Edward back to a psychiatric hospital. Kokoy and Berta face danger as a desperate person sets out to retrieve Jane's files.
46	"Confessions"	"Umamin"	August 1, 2022	1.6%
Jane sets out to find Edward upon learning that he got admitted to a psychiatric hospital. The ghost soon finds herself letting go of her inhibitions when a half-awake Edward confesses his feelings for her.
47	"Sweet Escape"	"Escape"	August 2, 2022	1.9% (Note: Based on Nielsen Comparative Ratings on Primetime, the series has no ratings both on Kapamilya Channel and Jeepney TV, while on Free TV, A2Z has 0.3% and TV5 has 1.6% on 10pm slot)
Refusing to let his predicament derail his dreams, Edward receives help from Jane as he escapes from the psych ward. Robert gets arrested for assaulting the police officer investigating the string of suspicious deaths in their community.
48	"Secret Bearers"	"Past"	August 3, 2022	1.6%
Berta and Kokoy reunite with Monmon. Edward makes it in time for his band's performance, only to ignite the tension between Andrea and Ofelia. To ensure that his secret remains under wraps, Marco does the unexpected.
49	"The Big Break"	"Pangarap"	August 4, 2022	2.1%
Even without the help of the Evergreen Mansion ghosts, the Lifeline Band gets the first big break in their musical career. Edward soon seizes the opportunity to ask for Jane's feelings following his confession.
50	"A Vision"	"Vision"	August 5, 2022	2.2%
Unaware that Valerie is trying to expel her, Jane receives a vision and gets transported to a mansion where her loved ones are currently staying. A wandering soul arrives at Evergreen Mansion.
51	"Blackmail"	"Blackmail"	August 8, 2022	2.2%
Patricio makes a shocking discovery upon finding the records of a soul mirroring Jane's situation. Andrea hides from Eileen the reason why she decided to let Edward return home.
52	"Ill-fated Lovers"	"Forbidden Love"	August 9, 2022	1.6%
Andrea tries bribing Ofelia into keeping her dark secret buried, only to be caught off guard by the maid's response. Edward and Jane confront the fact that their love is forbidden and is doomed to end.
53	"Let It Be"	"Persistent"	August 10, 2022	2.0%
Despite the time constraint between them, Edward refuses to give up on his love for Jane. Not wanting to keep her hopes up, Elias decides against revealing the truth about the situation of the lovestruck ghost just yet.
54	"Missing Family"	"Extortion"	August 11, 2022	1.6%
Jane visits her family with Edward, only to be thrown into a panic upon arriving at an empty and ransacked house. Elsewhere, Anton sneaks into the Montemayor's home to extort more money from Ofelia.
55	"The Traitors"	"Betrayal"	August 12, 2022 (iWantTFC (Note: The episode was pre-empted on Kapamilya Channel, A2Z Primetime and TV5 due to the airing of Ang Probinsyano's finale.))	N/A
Jane heads to Alice's house in hopes of finding clues regarding her family's whereabouts, only to burn in rage upon learning about her friend's betrayal.
56	"The Black Roses Sender"	"Unveiling"	August 15, 2022	2.0%
Words fail Jane upon learning the identity of the person who sent her black roses back when she was working at Zion. Valerie turns a deaf ear to reason as she remains adamant in getting Edward back.
57	"The Jealous Daughter"	"Jealousy"	August 16, 2022	N/A
Valerie is threatened that Jessie might leave her and her mother for good after overhearing her father's conversation with Monmon. Edward and Jane grow emotional as they talk about their inevitable separation.
58	"Loving From Afar"	"Surprise"	August 17, 2022	N/A
Patricio reprimands Elias for urging Jane to stay and work as a staff at the Evergreen Mansion. Edward brims with joy when his family shows up during one of his performances, unaware that Ofelia is watching him from afar.
59	"Petty Crime"	"Robbery"	August 18, 2022	N/A
Valerie bursts into tears upon confirming that Jessie has patched things up with Monmon. Ofelia is left with no choice but to ask Robert for money, until an untoward incident occurs at the Montemayor mansion.
60	"Scapegoat"	"Confrontation"	August 19, 2022	1.5%
Knowing that his head maid is in great need of money, Robert suspects that Ofelia might be the one who stole Andrea's jewelry. Jane is left speechless as she listens to Jessie and Valerie's conversation about her and Monmon.
61	"Ready To Leave"	"Confrontation"	August 22, 2022	1.8%
A heavy burden gets lifted off Jane's shoulders upon learning that Jessie regrets all his shortcomings as a father to her and Monmon. Edward, meanwhile, finds his heart sinking now that his special friend is ready to cross over.
62	"New Target"	"Move On"	August 23, 2022	1.8%
Growing suspicious, Robert hires a private investigator to learn about Ofelia's past. Alice finds herself in a precarious position when her exposé about Heaven's Gate and Zion goes viral. Jane spends her remaining time on Earth with Edward.
63	"The Real Ofelia"	"Investigation"	August 24, 2022	1.5%
After Jane's heartbreaking farewell, Edward catches Jessie in a suspicious conversation when he approaches him for help regarding Lifeline Bar's contract. Andrea discovers Ofelia's real identity.
64	"Truth Uncovered"	"Risk"	August 25, 2022	1.6%
Andrea decides to keep her discovery from Robert after learning who Ofelia really is. Edward and Jane get the shock of their lives upon seeing what Jessie is hiding inside Villa Clemente.
65	"Desperate Measure"	"Revelation"	August 26, 2022	1.5%
Marco resorts to desperate measures in a bid to keep his dirty secret buried. Robert and Andrea grow worried as one of their longtime investors pull out from Heaven's Gate. Jane overhears Berta's suspicions about Edward.
66	"The Setup"	"Hopeless"	August 29, 2022	1.7%
Ofelia confronts Andrea for setting her up, only to be shocked when her boss counters her threat with a grave mistake she committed in the past. Berta asks Edward to prove that he can really talk to Jane's spirit.
67	"Trust Earned"	"Threat"	August 30, 2022	1.7%
Convinced that Edward is telling the truth, Berta opens up about the circumstances related to Jane's situation. Robert senses something amiss with Zion and decides to cut ties with Marco.
68	"Captive"	"Acceptance"	August 31, 2022	1.6%
Edward vows to prove his family's innocence in Jane's accident. Valerie resolves to fight for what is rightfully hers. Marco's henchmen resort to violence to squeeze out information from Robbie and Alice.
69	"On the Lookout"	"Convict"	September 1, 2022	1.5%
Jane tries to return to her body in hopes of waking herself up from coma. While spying on the Montemayors, Elias grows worried after hearing a disturbing conversation.
70	"Coercion"	"Attempt"	September 2, 2022	1.4%
Robbie and Alice battle against time as they attempt to escape from their captors. After spending the day with her family, Jane receives a disturbing news.
71	"Souls to the Rescue"	"Bihag"	September 5, 2022	1.7%
Arriving just in time, Jane uses her abilities to rescue Robbie and Alice from danger. Ofelia gets in trouble for defending the Montemayors from a nosy neighbor. Heaven's Gate scandal begins to affect Edward's music career.
72	"The Vow"	"Rescue"	September 6, 2022	1.7%
The Evergreen Mansion staff gets sentimental about Jane's departure. With God as their witness, Jane and Edward make vows to each other. Valerie fails to rein in her jealousy upon learning that Jessie is canceling their plan to move abroad.
73	"The Reunion"	"Promise"	September 7, 2022	1.5%
While Valerie informs Eileen about Jane's situation, Marco receives a good news. Jane finally makes peace with Alice and Robbie, prompting the latter to do something unexpected.
74	"Looming Danger"	"Proposal"	September 8, 2022	1.4%
Not wanting his sister to end up living with regrets, Edward helps Ace make up with Eileen. Andrea expresses how much she appreciates Edward's efforts to save Heaven's Gate.
75	"Brother and Sister"	"Investigation"	September 9, 2022	1.8%
After extending an olive branch to Eileen, Edward learns that Valerie knows about Jane's situation. Fearing that the security of Villa Clemente has been compromised, he immediately hops in his car and calls Lt. Arnaiz.
76	"Not Living Nor Dead"	"Reconciled"	September 12, 2022	2.0%
Jessie puts his life on the line as he tries to protect Jane from the armed men who infiltrated Villa Clemente. Believing that the staff of Evergreen Mansion will protect them, Edward transfers Jane to Lifeline Bar.
77	"Letting Go"	"Saved"	September 13, 2022	1.6%
Patricio breaks the very rule he imposes to help Jane identify the man behind Alice and Robbie's abduction. Elias lets go of Jane and entrusts the woman he loves to Edward.
78	"Ghost No More"	"Paubaya"	September 14, 2022	1.5%
The mastermind behind Heaven's Gate and Zion Isurance's organized crime is finally revealed. Valerie visits Jane to execute her evil plan against her half-sister, only for it to backfire on her.
79	"The Wolf in Sheep's Clothing"	"Alive"	September 15, 2022	2.0%
While recovering from her coma, Jane brims with joy as she is now able to feel Edward's touch. Andrea's blood runs cold as news of Marco's arrest hits the headlines.
80	"It's a Prank"	"Pretense"	September 16, 2022	1.3%
In desperate need of money to finance his gambling addiction, Anton threatens to expose Ofelia to her employers. Jane comes up with a way to prank her friends from Evergreen Mansion.
81	"The Witness"	"Prank"	September 19, 2022	1.4%
While Diana tries to convince Patricio in revealing the horrific thing she witnessed, Jane patched things up with Jessie and Valerie. Soon, she informs the authorities that Marco has a female accomplice.
82	"Jane Second Life"	"Witness"	September 20, 2022	1.5%
Andrea is on pins and needles after learning that Jane was the one who tipped off the authorities about Marco's female accomplice. Vowing to never waste her second chance at life, Jane spends quality time with Edward and her family.
83	"Meet the Parents"	"Second Life"	September 21, 2022	1.2%
Filled with remorse, Valerie confesses a grave mistake to Susan. As Jane finally meets the Montemayors, Andrea warns her about endangering Edward's life if she keeps pursuing Marco's case.
84	"Leave No Trace"	"The Meet-up"	September 22, 2022	1.4%
Andrea finds a way to cover up her tracks as Jane insists on finding Marco's female accomplice. Just when their relationship is getting better, Jane stumbles upon a shocking discovery about Valerie.
85	"Heartless Jane Is Back"	"Erased"	September 23, 2022	1.2%
Seething with rage, Jane confronts Valerie about the latter's attempt on her life and vows to bring her to justice. Marco takes advantage of Andrea's secrets in a bid to get himself out of jail.
86	"Meet Ofelia"	"Unforgiving"	September 26, 2022	1.5%
Edward tries to encourage Jane to find it in her heart to forgive Valerie, but to no avail. Anton stumbles upon Josie's secret while sneaking around the Montemayor's mansion.
87	"A Confession of Crime"	"Mother"	September 27, 2022	1.5%
Andrea informs her accomplice about Marco's threat. Anton blackmails Ofelia into giving him a vast sum. Valerie does the unthinkable as guilt weighs her heart down.
88	"A Sister's Sacrifice"	"Guilty"	September 28, 2022	2.0%
Jane finds it in her heart to forgive Valerie when Marco's plan to escape turns awry. Amid the unfortunate news about the arrested fraudster, Edward begins to suspect that Marco's accomplice is someone powerful.
89	"Unexpected Guests"	"Sacrifice"	September 29, 2022	N/A
While unexpected guests who could help with her case arrive at Evergreen Mansion, Jane grows suspicious of Marco's death. Ofelia makes a tough choice in a bid to protect the person she loves the most.
90	"Failed Attempt"	"Pitfall"	September 30, 2022	N/A
Ofelia pleads with Anton to spare Edward from the pain her secret may cause him. Learning of Ofelia's predicament, Andrea steps in to keep Anton's mouth shut. Edward plans a romantic surprise for Jane.
91	"Marco's Story"	"Beg"	October 3, 2022	N/A
Knowing that she is in a precarious position, Andrea resolves to put an end to her illegal operations. Marco gets devastated upon learning about what happened to his family.
92	"A Change of Heart"	"Appearance"	October 4, 2022	N/A
With the help of her former boss' late loved ones, Jane convinces Marco to have a change of heart. Following the attempt on his life, Anton vows to get back at Andrea and Ofelia.
93	"It's A No"	"Forgiven"	October 5, 2022	N/A
Jane rejects Edward's marriage proposal upon learning of his mother's involvement in her case. Despite the news of Andrea's connection with Marco, the Montemayors continue to believe in their matriarch's innocence.
94	"Stay Wary"	"Rejected"	October 6, 2022	N/A
Ofelia realizes that her boss ordered the attempt on Anton's life in a bid to protect her family. Jane grows perturbed as she continues to investigate Andrea's alleged link with Marco without Edward's knowledge.
95	"Part Ways"	"Settlement"	October 7, 2022	N/A
Edward's problems pile up when Marco's allegations against Andrea cause a rift in his relationship with Jane and his bandmates. Ofelia gets forced to reveal her secret to prevent Anton from doing the unthinkable.
96	"The Real Father"	"Break Up"	October 10, 2022	N/A
Jane bursts into tears as she rushes out of Heaven's Gate following her confrontation with Andrea. While crying inside her car, she overhears Ofelia quarreling with Anton and accidentally discovers the truth about Edward's identity.
97	"Come Clean"	"Father"	October 11, 2022	N/A
An altercation ensues between Andrea and Ofelia as the former tries to prevent the latter from telling the Montemayors the truth. Patricio and Diana urge Jane to do the right thing for Edward's sake.
98	"Lies After Lies"	"Altercation"	October 12, 2022	N/A
Andrea's world comes crashing down when her most-kept secret finally spills out. Desperate to get herself out of trouble, she concocts another lie in a bid to turn the tides in her favor.
99	"Mutual Goals"	"Lies"	October 13, 2022	N/A
Believing Andrea's lies, Edward lashes out at Ofelia and asks his real mother to never show him her face again. Ofelia gains a new ally in Jane as she resolves to continue protecting her son from Anton.
100	"Suspect Confirmed"	"New Ally"	October 14, 2022	N/A
Robert gives Edward an advice about love and forgiveness as their family prepares for their nearing vacation in the U.S. Jane takes matters into her own hands in a bid to secure a piece of solid evidence against Andrea.
101	"Serving a New Master"	"Bistado"	October 17, 2022	N/A
Andrea finds help in Anton when a former ally attempts to betray her. Jane lands in danger as she gets hold of a significant piece of evidence that may prove her claims against Andrea.
102	"Will Death Catch Up?"	"Evidence"	October 18, 2022	N/A
With Anton's help, a desperate Andrea goes to great lengths to keep her secrets under wraps. Upon learning of the truth, Edward apologizes to Jane for doubting her and vows to do the right thing.
103	"Saving Grace"	"Kill Order"	October 19, 2022	N/A
Jane, Edward, and Ofelia receive much-needed help as they try to escape from the fire engulfing the Evergreen Mansion. Andrea reins in her unease as she awaits an update on Anton's mission.
104	"Failed Exposé"	"Saving Grace"	October 20, 2022	N/A
Despite the dangers she is facing, Jane remains adamant in exposing Andrea's illegal activities to the public. However, she is left speechless upon spotting a familiar face during her press conference.
105	"A Neverending Limbo"	"Silenced"	October 21, 2022	N/A
After reneging on her statement against Andrea, Jane breaks out in a cold sweat upon confirming that Anton has kidnapped Monmon. Edward urges Eileen to do the right thing in a bid to find and rescue the innocent child.
106	"A Mother's Sacrifice"	"Hostage"	October 24, 2022	N/A
As a way to atone for her past mistakes, Diana breaks the rules of the heavens to help Jane find Monmon. Edward gets to confront Anton as he and Jane rescue the boy.
107	"The End of Andrea"	"Atonement"	October 25, 2022	N/A
Jane and Edward bring Andrea to justice as they expose her secrets and lies. However, an unforeseen twist of events turns their much-awaited victory into great sorrow.
108	"Finding A New Purpose"	"Arrested"	October 26, 2022	N/A
After trying to hug her son, Ofelia recalls the bitter reason why Edward cannot find the heart to forgive Andrea. Tears flow at Evergreen Mansion as it welcomes its new manager.
109	"Love Will Keep Us Alive"	"New Manager"	October 27, 2022	N/A
While performing in front of his fans, friends, and loved ones during Lifeline Bar's reopening, Edward asks Jane to accompany him in reaching their dream of sharing the same spot in the night sky when they become stars in the future.
110	"The End"	"Love Wins"	October 28, 2022	N/A
