= Ghosting (TV series) =

2025 Philippine romantic comedy television series

- Genre: Romantic comedy; Supernatural; Romantic fantasy
- Directed by: Theodore Boborol
- Starring: Fyang Smith; JM Ibarra
- Country of origin: Philippines
- Original language: Filipino
- No. of episodes: 16

Production
- Running time: 21–34 minutes
- Production company: ABS-CBN Studios

Original release
- Network: iWant
- Release: July 19 – December 14, 2025

Ghosting is a Philippine romantic comedy fantasy television series. It was directed by Theodore Boborol. The series stars Fyang Smith and JM Ibarra. It is their first acting project as a love team. The series premiered on iWant on July 19, 2025 to December 14, 2025.

== Premise ==
The story follows a young student named Jaja. She travels to the province to live with her grandmother after a person she was dating stopped communicating with her, which is known as "ghosting". Jaja tries to summon the spirit of the man who left her, but she accidentally meets a different spirit named Wilberto. Wilberto is a ghost who wanders the earth. He was a soldier during the 1940s The two characters develop a romantic relationship that involves the boundary between the living and the dead.

== Cast ==
=== Main ===
- Fyang Smith as Jaja, a college student trying to move on from a heartbreak.
- JM Ibarra as Wilberto / Treb / Macmac, Wilberto is spirit and soldier from the 1940s. Macmac is a photographer.

=== Supporting ===
- Vivoree Esclito as Emma, Jaja's best friend.
- Kobie Brown as Vhal, the person who "ghosted" Jaja.
- Gello Marquez
- Zach Guerrero as Bert, Wilberto's grandson.
- Peewee O’Hara
- Ces Quesada
- Ruvy Ruiz
- Benjie Paras as Kiko (Part 2).
- Hyubs Azarcon as Badong (Part 2).

== Episodes ==
No.	Title	Original release date
Part 1
1	"Patay Na Patay Sa'yo" (transl. Head Over Heels for You)	July 19, 2025
Jaja's desperate call inadvertently attracts the attention of a restless soul named Wilberto. To move on from her boyfriend who ghosted her, she retreats to her grandmother's province, where an unexpected encounter awaits her.
2	"Takot Ako!" (transl. I'm Scared!)	July 26, 2025
Though hesitant at first, Jaja strikes a deal with Wilberto upon learning that he can easily track down Vhal. Her charms, however, seem to have an effect on the ghost.
3	"Kisapmata" (transl. Blink of an Eye)	August 2, 2025
Jaja discovers Vhal's betrayal, breaking her heart in the blink of an eye. Because of this, Wilberto thinks of a way to cheer her up, only for a misunderstanding to arise.
4	"Multo in the City" (transl. Ghost in the City)	August 9, 2025
Realizing that Wilberto's struggles are bigger than her heartache, Jaja decides to fulfill her promise to him. Together, the ghost and the ghosted return to Manila in hopes of seeing Wilberto's estranged sister, Nadia.
5	"Bahay ni Lola" (transl. Grandma's House)	August 16, 2025
Wilberto's reunion with Nadia sends him into a rollercoaster of emotions. Jaja, on the other hand, begins to see the ghost in a different light as she comforts him.
6	"Gumising Ka, Jaja" (transl. Wake Up, Jaja)	August 23, 2025
Caught in a whimsical dream, Jaja grows uncertain about her feelings for Wilberto. Later, Jaja finds a way to persuade Bert to let them see Nadia once more.
7	"U-Boo"	August 30, 2025
Jaja feigns illness to delay Wilberto's crossing to the light. Despite her uncertainties, the young lady continues to help Wilberto reconcile with Nadia. Later, Jaja stumbles upon a ghost from her past.
8	"Return of the Living Deadz"	September 6, 2025
Jaja finds herself caught between the ghosts of her past and present. While Vhal seeks a second chance, Wilberto refuses to leave Jaja and let her get back with her ex.
9	"Ang Babae Nawawala sa Sarili" (transl. The Girl Who Loses Herself)	September 13, 2025
Jaja follows her heart despite knowing that this will break her. Understanding that Jaja's life is better without him, Wilberto sets out to cross the light with Tony.
10	"Shake, Rattle, and Love"	September 20, 2025
An unfinished business stops Wilberto from crossing the light just yet, leading to an unexpected twist that grants the ghost a chance to be with Jaja.
Part 2
11	"Patayin sa Sindak ni Jaja" (transl. Frighten Jaja to Death)	November 1, 2025
At Wilberto's grave, Jaja meets a handsome photographer who looks uncannily like the ghost she once loved. To prove to her friends that she is telling the truth, Jaja storms into his home-only to meet his father, who unexpectedly needs her help.
12	"I See Dead Pipol"	November 8, 2025
To clear her name and keep Ka-Feels from shutting down, Jaja offers to help track down the scammer who stole Kiko's precious ring. Meanwhile, despite his denial, Macmac finds himself increasingly drawn to Jaja.
13	"Talk to Me"	November 15, 2025
Despite her guilt toward Wilberto, Jaja grows smitten with Macmac when the latter brings her on a date at the carnival. They enter the horror house where fear turns to laughter and something more.
14	"Signos"	November 22, 2025
Jaja refuses to face Macmac when he shows up at Ka-Feels, but he persistently waits until he hears about a person from her past. After looking into Jaja's ex, Macmac prepares a dazzling surprise that brings them closer to love.
15	"Mang-iiwan in Manila" (transl. Leaving in Manila)	December 6, 2025
Jaja and Macmac's relationship feels perfect until a quiet moment paves the way for Jaja's doubts to creep in. When Macmac stumbles upon Wilberto's photo, he finally asks the question Jaja is most afraid to answer.
16	"Wag Buhayin ang Bangkay" (transl. Don't Revive the Corpse)	December 14, 2025
Macmac finds comfort and wisdom in his family about his relationship with Jaja, while she faces the truth she has been running away from. As the two make peace with one another, Jaja decides to close her third eye.

== Production ==
=== Development ===
The series is an iWant original production. It was directed by Theodore Boborol, who previously directed films such as Vince & Kath & James. The series was created to launch the new interface of the iWant application in July 2025.

=== Filming ===
The lead actors, Ibarra and Smith, stated that they attended workshops to prepare for the series because it was their first acting job. Ibarra noted that playing a character from the 1940s was difficult because he had to remain serious while other cast members did improvised comedy. Smith stated that she struggled to not laugh during ad-libs made by co-star Gello Marquez. The production team filmed two different endings for the first part of the series. The producers decided which ending to release based on how the show performed with the audience.

== Release ==
Ghosting was released exclusively on iWant on July 19, 2025. The first part originally consisted of 8 episodes but was extended to 10 episodes.

A spin-off titled Girly Pop Diaries was released in October 2025, which recapped the story from Jaja's perspective.

A second part of the series was confirmed after the show consistently ranked in the top five most-watched programs on the platform. Ghosting Part 2 premiered on November 1, 2025. The second part introduced new characters and focused on Jaja's life after college. It consisted of 6 episodes.

== Markteing ==
Before the premiere, the trailer received over 23 million views across social media platforms.
