= The Entitled (2022 film) =

2022 Filipino romantic comedy film

- Directed by: Theodore Boborol
- Written by: Noreen Capili; Theodore Boborol; Catherine Gonzaga-Morada
- Produced by: Paul Soriano; Mark Victor
- Starring: Alex Gonzaga; JC de Vera
- Cinematography: Noel Teehankee
- Edited by: Beng Bandong
- Music by: Jessie Lasaten
- Production company: TinCan Productions
- Distributed by: Netflix
- Release date: July 29, 2022
- Country: Philippines
- Language: Filipino
- Budget: 90 minutes

The Entitled is a 2022 Filipino romantic comedy film directed by Theodore Boborol. Starring Alex Gonzaga and JC de Vera . The film centers about a woman hailing from the rural areas learns that her estranged father is a wealthy hotel tycoon. The film premiered on Netflix on July 29, 2022.

== Synopsis ==
Upon discovering that her estranged father is a hotel tycoon, Belinda awkwardly navigates her way through a refined lifestyle with the assistance of a charismatic attorney.

== Cast ==
- Alex Gonzaga as Belinda Buenavista
- JC de Vera as Atty. Jacob
- Ara Mina as Matilda
- Johnny Revilla as Enrico
- Melai Cantiveros as Yaya Molina
- Andi Abaya as Caitlyn
- Rolando Inocencio as Tsong Monyo
- Kobie Brown as Bret
- Issa Litton as Missy
