= Finally Found Someone =

- Theatrical release poster
- Directed by: Theodore Boborol
- Written by: Gilliann Ebreo; Carmi Raymundo; Patrick John Valencia
- Produced by: Charo Santos-Concio; Malou N. Santos; Vic Del Rosario Jr.
- Starring: John Lloyd Cruz; Sarah Geronimo
- Cinematography: Gary Gardoce
- Edited by: Beng Bandong
- Music by: Jessie Lasaten
- Production companies: ABS-CBN Film Productions; Viva Films
- Distributed by: Star Cinema
- Release date: July 26, 2017
- Running time: 125 minutes
- Country: Philippines
- Languages: Filipino; English
- Box office: ₱316.5 million (as of August 26, 2017) (US$6.2 million)

Finally Found Someone is a 2017 Filipino romantic comedy film starring John Lloyd Cruz and Sarah Geronimo. The film was directed by Theodore Boborol and was produced by Star Cinema and Viva Films. It was released in cinemas nationwide on July 26, 2017. The film marks the reunion of Cruz and Geronimo after A Very Special Love (2008), You Changed My Life (2009), and It Takes a Man and a Woman (2013), all produced by Star Cinema and Viva Films. The principal photography for the film started in late February 2017. According to Star Cinema, the film earned ₱20 million on its opening day despite the bad weather. The movie breached the ₱100-million mark on its fourth blockbuster day. As of August 6, 2017, Finally Found Someone had grossed ₱200 million. As of August 13, 2017, Finally Found Someone had breached more than ₱300 million in less than three weeks of showing. As of August 15, 2017, the film had reached ₱316.5 million worldwide.

== Plot ==
Aprilyn, who is left by her groom, Randy, on the day of their wedding, goes viral online. Devastated, she meets Raffy who works at a public relations agency hired by the father of the groom to help her move on, so that Randy will win the mayoral election when the public "forgives" him, once Aprilyn forgives him. As the storyline unfolds, it is revealed that both Aprilyn and Raffy were marked by a childhood in which they each had a parent who went overseas to work, leaving each of them impaired in their relationship abilities. Each contributes to the other's self-discovery, and over the course of the movie they gain insights into themselves and a love for one another.

== Cast ==
=== Main cast ===
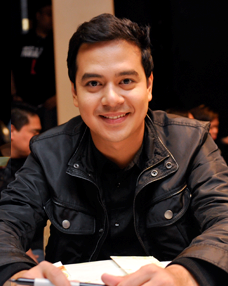
John Lloyd Cruz portrays Rafael "Raffy" Sandoval

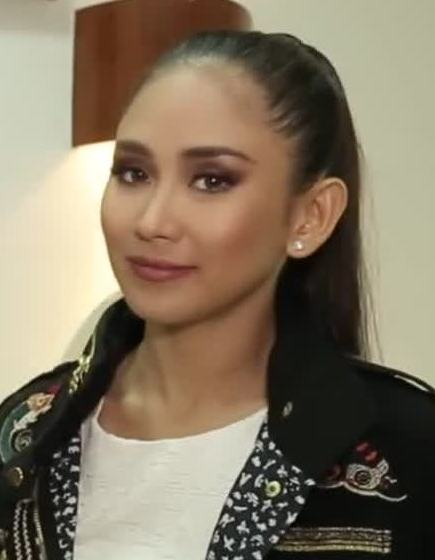
Sarah Geronimo portrays Aprilyn Esguerra

- John Lloyd Cruz as Rafael "Raffy" Sandoval
- Sarah Geronimo as Aprilyn Esguerra

=== Supporting cast ===
- Joey Marquez as Pondong Esguerra
- Yayo Aguila as Maybelyn Esguerra
- Dennis Padilla as Mayor Garcia
- Tetchie Agbayani as Evy
- Christian Bables as Noah Alcala
- Alwyn Uytingco as Ron
- Alexa Ilacad as Junilyn Esguerra
- Joj Agpangan as Mary
- Justin Cuyugan as Vic
- Ruby Ruiz as Babylyn
- PJ Endrinal as Markus
- Lemuel Pelayo as Harold
- Cara Eriguel as Denise
- Negi as Alfaro
- Marnie Lapus as Rachel Santos
- Axel Torres as Rick
- April Matienzo as Trina
- Leo Rialp as Mr. G
- Milo Elmido Jr. as Gian
- Zachie Reighn Rivera

=== Special participation ===
- Enchong Dee as Randy Garcia

== Release ==
=== Promotion ===
On July 6, 2017, Star Cinema released the trailer of the film via Facebook, it garnered millions of views and thousands of shares in few hours. John Lloyd Cruz and Sarah Geronimo guested on various TV shows including Gandang Gabi, Vice!, Magandang Buhay and Tonight with Boy Abunda to promote the film. The tandem also appeared on concert-variety show ASAP and sung the Barbra Streisand and Bryan Adams' 1996 hit song "I Finally Found Someone", where it took from the film's title.

=== Theatrical run ===
The film was premiered at two different locations in Pasig and Quezon City on July 24. It was released on Philippine Cinemas on July 26 and earned PHP 20 million despite bad weather. It was reported to gain PHP 100 million in just 4 days. As of August 6, 2017, the movie has already grossed PHP 200 million. As of August 13, 2017, the movie has already grossed more than PHP 300 million.

== Soundtrack ==
Sarah Geronimo recorded the song "I Just Fall in Love Again", which served as the movie's theme song. Star Music released the official music video of the song on July 10, 2017. Removed without the first chorus and third verse. Later, the song "I Just Fall in Love Again" was also the official opening and main theme song for the GMA Network action drama series, Black Rider, which aired from November 6, 2023 to July 26, 2024.

== See also ==
- A Very Special Love
- You Changed My Life
- It Takes a Man and a Woman
