= Pinoy Big Brother: Connect =

15th edition of the Filipino reality television show

- Season 9
- Title card
- Presented by: Toni Gonzaga; Bianca Gonzalez; Robi Domingo; Kim Chiu; Maymay Entrata; Melai Cantiveros; Enchong Dee; Richard Juan
- No. of days: 91
- No. of housemates: 18
- Winner: Liofer Pinatacan
- Runner-up: Andrea Abaya
- Companion show: Pinoy Big Brother: Kumunect Tayo Afternoon and Primetime Shows (online)
- No. of episodes: 98

Release
- Original network: Kapamilya Channel
- Original release: December 6, 2020 – March 14, 2021

Season chronology
- ← Previous; Otso Next → Kumunity Season 10

The ninth season of the reality game show Pinoy Big Brother, subtitled Connect, aired on Kapamilya Channel and A2Z for 99 days from December 6, 2020, to March 14, 2021.

This was the fifth consecutive season that both civilian adults and teenagers participated in a season, and the first time since All In season to house them together as just one batch. Among all regular and special seasons, this season was the season with the shortest number of days (99; ties with Gen 11) of which a group of housemates representing an entire season have stayed in the house. The first season to feature three out of four finalists were never face the public for eviction.

Liofer Pinatacan won the season against runner-up Andrea Abaya. Kobie Brown and Jie-Ann Armero finished as finalists.

== Development ==
With the scrapping of the television broadcast operations of ABS-CBN by the NTC on May 5, 2020, the continuity of the local Big Brother franchise was left uncertain. This is because of the House of Representatives denied ABS-CBN's franchise. No news or information were provided by the network nor by the production team behind the show of the fate of the said franchise. However, on October 16, 2020, Pinoy Big Brother hinted an announcement for a possible return of the show. On the 18th of October in 2020, on ASAP Natin 'To!, it was officially announced that a new season would air as Pinoy Big Brother: Connect. No physical auditions will be held; instead all auditions will be done online.

ABS-CBN's Television Production Head Unit and the Head Director of the Pinoy Big Brother franchise, Direk Lauren Dyogi, revealed in an interview of an episode of TV Patrol that Pinoy Big Brother: Connect would push through in November 2020, although the exact date was not mentioned. However, it was later confirmed that Pinoy Big Brother: Connect began on December 6, 2020. Dyogi also revealed that the ninth season to take place at the current situation of the network and of the country was unplanned, and that it had only prospered after the show had partnered with Kumu.

The number of housemates who took part in this season was initially lowered to 12, making this season with the fewest housemates in Pinoy Big Brother history, surpassing the first regular season of Pinoy Big Brother, the season that had only 13 housemates. However, it was later confirmed via online PBB: KUMUlitan show with Robi Domingo and Lie Reposposa that 18 aspiring housemates will be taking part this season.

=== Auditions ===
Pinoy Big Brother: Connect was first revealed during the October 18, 2020, episode of ASAP Natin 'To!, along with new audition mechanics for this newest season. As the season was held during the COVID-19 pandemic in the Philippines, the auditions and its program were held using Kumu, a Filipino online streaming platform. Auditions were opened for ages 16 to 35 years-old. The auditions were opened on October 19, 2020; it ended on November 11, 2020.

For an aspiring housemate to join Pinoy Big Brother: Connect, they must create a Kumu account and recorded a one-minute video wherein they introduce themselves and why they want to join Pinoy Big Brother. Afterwards, they were required to upload their audition video on Kumu and use the hashtag #PBBkumuaudition; a maximum of one entry per account will be accepted. If an auditionee was accepted as one of the shortlisted hopefuls, they will receive a message from a PBB executive via Kumu's texting service. At the end of the online auditions via Kumu, a total of 177,524 audition entries were submitted for this season—the highest in the entire history of the franchise.

=== COVID-19 precautions ===
Pinoy Big Brother: Connect had some notable changes as a result of the COVID-19 pandemic in the Philippines, which forced the country's government to impose restrictions to mitigate the spread of the said virus. Prior to the premiere of Pinoy Big Brother: Connect on December 6, 2020, the Pinoy Big Brother house was thoroughly disinfected, the hosts, crew, and the housemates of the show also went onto a PCR testing, and social distancing was also being observed inside the house as a preventive measure during the COVID-19 pandemic. There is also no audience present on the premiere night of the show on December 6, 2020.

=== Timeslot ===
The show aired daily on Mondays to Fridays at 10:00 p.m. after Walang Hanggang Paalam, on Saturdays at 10:00 p.m. after Maalaala Mo Kaya, and on Sundays at 8:30 p.m. after Your Face Sounds Familiar. The show's companion show, Pinoy Big Brother: Kumunect Tayo, aired daily via Kumu, Facebook, and YouTube at 5:00 p.m. for its afternoon show, while it follows the main show's schedule for its evening show.

Also, in this season, evictions regularly occurred on Sundays, while the lists of nominees were usually revealed on Mondays or Tuesdays.

The show pre-empted on December 20, 2020, to give way for ABS-CBN's Christmas Special.

=== Hosts ===
Toni Gonzaga, Bianca Gonzalez, and Robi Domingo reprised their roles as hosts. Meanwhile, new digital hosts joined the show: Richard Juan was the host for the show's online updates; while Enchong Dee and Melai Cantiveros were the hosts for the show's online companion programs across various online platforms. Kim Chiu, Edward Barber, and Maymay Entrata were earlier reported to host online contents for the program (with Chiu and Entrata having joined the official launch and the Big Night respectively, while Barber only appeared on the Big Night, acting for the Comedy sketch as one of the housemates), but were never seen doing their hosting stints in the succeeding events of the show; Dee and Cantiveros, on the other hand, were occasionally seen to host the afternoon online companion show.

=== Prizes ===
The winner of this season won a unit from PHirst Park Homes and a cash prize of ₱1,000,000 from Brilliant Skin Essentials. Meanwhile, the second, third and fourth big placers received ₱500,000, ₱300,000 and ₱200,000, respectively.

=== Broadcast ===
This was the first season where the show was not aired on ABS-CBN after the network was ordered by the National Telecommunications Commission to cease and desist its free-to-air television and radio broadcast operations on May 5, 2020, following the lapse of its congressional franchise. The network also failed to secure a renewal of its congressional franchise after its renewal bid was rejected by the House of Representatives on July 10, 2020.

The show also aired on TV5 from March 8 until the show's finale on March 14, 2021, as part of the partnership arrangement (later as blocktime/content agreement) between ABS-CBN and TV5. The Gen 11 season would become the first full season to air on the network, and the second overall to air on TV5 following this season.

The show was also simulcast and digitally streamed via ABS-CBN's entertainment website, iWantTFC (on-demand streaming service) and Kapamilya Online Live in Facebook and YouTube; live feeds of the House were also shown on Kumu, an online streaming platform.

== Format ==
Each week, each participating housemate had to nominate two people for eviction with the first receiving two points and the second with one point. The housemates with the most votes (usually three) will then face the public vote with the nominee receiving the fewest votes (through a save to evict voting system) being evicted from the house. The format however may be altered as seen in Day 49 where the Co-HoHs directly nominated two nominees each and in Day 81 where the housemates ranked their housemates rather than the usual nomination process.

As a punishment or as a consequence, Big Brother can automatically nominate additional housemates if they had incurred violations or have failed a specific task. Big Brother can also give immunity to those who have succeeded in winning a challenge or a task. Sometimes, Big Brother can suspend the nomination process or moved the nominations to a later date in lieu of the result of a pending challenge or task.

=== Twists ===
- Partnership with Kumu
  - Kumunity Housemate Selection – The last three official housemates were chosen by the public out of the 117 hopefuls via the Kumu app. From December 6 to 27, these hopefuls were tasked to make livestream videos and had engagements with the public via Kumu. Those three hopefuls who received the most diamonds by the public during the said duration became the official housemates.
  - In every weekly task, the housemates were given the privilege to do livestreams in order to earn diamonds; these diamonds were used to buy materials for the tasks or to buy practice time for their routines, to name a few.
  - Kumu users were given more percentage in the vote-to-evict or vote-to-save system: they were given a weight of 70% in the total votes compared with the 30% weight of votes coming from SMS. This set-up was later altered to one Kumu vote was equivalent to 10 SMS votes.
  - Kumu users, through public poll within the app, were sometimes given the privilege to suggest punishments for the housemates as a consequence for the violations they have incurred. They were also given the opportunity to decide on several things, such as: whether to increase the items needed in a task or challenge, to increase the difficulty of a task or challenge, or in how will Big Brother announce new twists to the housemates.
  - Padaluck – Last used in the Lucky 7 season, the Kumu users had the chance to give an advantage to a housemate. The advantage was given to the housemate who had received the most "padalucks" through Kumu's livestream gifting system. This twist was also used in the fourth and succeeding Heads on Household challenges.
  - Kumu Houseguests – Kumu users compete and win via Kumu for two slots as houseguests; as houseguests, they stayed in the House and joined the housemates in their weekly task for a certain number of days.
- Heads of Household – Last used in Unlimited, those who earned the title were granted immunity from being nominated in the upcoming nomination week.
- Instant Nominations during the Launch Night – If the housemates failed to finish their first task during the launch night, three of them will be nominated instantly.
- Isolation Area – During the launch night and after finishing their first task, the Heads of Households named three housemates who stayed and lived in an isolation area. They were not allowed to cross the demarcated line unless when allowed by Big Brother. The only way for them to join the other housemates was to successfully finish Big Brother's secret tasks.
- Vote-to-Save or Vote-to-Evict System – Last used in the 737 season, the public were allowed to vote for the housemate they want to save or evict.
- Supercharged Challenges – For the fifth Heads of Household challenges, other housemates challenged the holders of the HoH titles. At the end of the challenges, the two housemates who won were immune for two consecutive weeks.
  - Supercharged Power – The two Heads of Household housemates who earned their titles during the Supercharged Challenges were given the power to exclusively nominate the other housemates for eviction.
  - Power of Veto – The Heads of Household had the power to remove a housemate in the list of nominees for eviction.
    - This power was also used after the two weeks of Supercharged Challenges. The power was given to a group of housemates who won a competition; this power was a collective power and that the housemate that got the most votes from the members of this group receives the power of veto medallion and is saved automatically from the nominations.
- Delika-Dos – The performance of the housemates in a challenge determined if one or two housemates will be evicted during the sixth eviction night.
- Rank-based Nomination – Instead of nominating two housemates for eviction, the housemates ranked all the remaining housemates—including themselves— from the most favored to the least favored to be included in the Big 4. The most favored received the fewest point (for ranked 1st, 1 point); the least favored received the most points (the last in rank, 8 points). This twist was last used in Lucky 7 season.
- Big 4 Karapatdapat Challenges – For the second to the last week of the season, and in order to determine the four finalists, all housemates participated in a series of challenges to determine their respective Big 4 slots. But unlike in all previous seasons, winning one challenge did not automatically guaranteed a housemate's slot for the Big 4. Winners of a challenge may have to defend their position in the last two Challenger challenges. This twist was the first time in the franchise's history that all Big 4 slots were determined by a series of challenges as previous seasons usually determined their Big 4 via a mix of public voting and use of challenges. This twist was similar to the concept of the Supercharged Challenges Heads of Household twist.

== Overview ==
=== Logo ===
The logo for Pinoy Big Brother: Connect still used its graphical eye, (first introduced in the previous season) in which the eye features motifs inspired by and colors taken from the Philippine flag. The outline of the house which was used before in the logo of Pinoy Big Brother: Otso was later removed. The colors of the text were also changed from the previous navy blue color now with a slightly lighter blue. The color of the season text in the logo was emphasized with a bright yellow and an orange gradient.

=== House ===
The Pinoy Big Brother house was refurnished with new furniture in the living room, the bedroom, and the dining area. There were no major changes in the house interior, which still follows the original layout used in Pinoy Big Brother: Otso. The house façade was decorated with Christmas decorations due to Christmas already drawing near at the start of the season.

=== Theme song ===
This season's theme song is "Connected Na Tayo" performed and written by Otso ex-housemates Jem Macatuno, Shawntel Cruz, Lie Reposposa and Kiara Takahashi where, just like the preceding season's theme song "Otso Na!", most elements (including the chorus) from Orange and Lemons' "Pinoy Ako," the franchise's theme song, were included in the song.

The season's eviction theme song was performed, written, and produced by Jem Macatuno entitled "Bagong Simula." Both songs are included in the album "Connected Na Tayo (Ang Soundtrack Ng Bahay Mo Vol. 2)".

== Housemates ==
A week prior to the entry of the first 12 housemates, the identities of two housemates were revealed daily via It's Showtime! and TV Patrol. Officially, the first 12 housemates entered during the premiere night of the show on December 6, 2020. Among them, 6 were adults, while the remaining 6 were teenagers.

It was later announced that six more housemates will soon be introduced in the upcoming episodes after accomplishing their mandatory 14-day quarantine. Three of the additional housemates were already pre-selected and were completing their own isolation periods before their entry, including one from France whose travel to the Philippines in order to compete was facilitated by the production staff. The other three were selected via Kumu; they vied among 117 hopefuls in various series of livestream challenges in three different stages. The selection process began on December 6 and ended on December 26. As of January 24, 2021, the three new housemates have already entered the House, after completing the required health clearances, including mandatory quarantine, psychological test, and COVID-19 test.

List of Pinoy Big Brother: Connect Housemates
Name	Age on Entry	Type	Hometown	Day entered	Day exited	Status	Refs.
Liofer Pinatacan	21	Adult	Zamboanga del Sur	Day 4	Day 99	Winner	
Andrea Abaya	18	Teen	Parañaque	Day 1	Day 99	Runner-up	
Kobie Brown	17	Teen	Parañaque	Day 1	Day 99	3rd Place	
Jie-Ann Armero	16	Teen	Sarangani	Day 1	Day 99	4th Place	
Amanda Zamora	19	Teen	San Juan, Metro Manila	Day 35	Day 95	Evicted	
Ralph Malibunas	22	Adult	Paris, France	Day 14	Day 95	Evicted	
Chico Alicaya	26	Adult	Cebu	Day 1	Day 92	Evicted	
Ella Cayabyab	20	Adult	Quezon	Day 1	Day 85	Evicted	
Quincy Villanueva	26	Adult	Laguna	Day 42	Day 78	Evicted	
Alyssa Exala	27	Adult	Australia	Day 4	Day 71	Evicted	
Gail Banawis	24	Adult	New York, USA	Day 49^{2}	Day 71	Evicted	
Kyron Aguilera	16	Teen	Butuan	Day 1	Day 64	Evicted	
Aizyl Tandugon	21	Adult	Misamis Oriental	Day 1	Day 57	Evicted	
Haira Palaguitto	16	Teen	Pangasinan	Day 1	Day 50	Evicted	
Crismar Menchavez	19	Teen	Palawan	Day 1	Day 43	Evicted	
Mika Pajares	21	Adult	Bataan	Day 1	Day 36	Evicted	
Russu Laurente	19	Teen	General Santos	Day 1	Day 29	Evicted	
Justin Dizon	22	Adult	Pampanga	Day 1	Day 22	Evicted	

- Liofer Pinatacan: Known as the "Dong Diskarte of Zamboanga del Sur," he was recognized for his industrious and resourceful approach to tasks and was never nominated for eviction. However, there was tension with Justin regarding an incident where Liofer was accused of making light of a sensitive topic.
- Andrea Abaya: Called the "Cheerdance Sweetheart of Parañaque," she was initially compared to Otso fan favorite Ashley del Mundo. In the house, she was a core member of the "Council" and was only nominated once, but the nomination was vetoed. She was also involved in a romantic relationship with Kobie.
- Kobie Brown: Dubbed the "Charming Striker ng Parañaque" due to his football background, he quickly became close friends with fellow footballer Chico and developed a strong connection with Andrea as the season progressed. He also gained attention for displaying strong emotional reactions during two notable moments.
- Jie-Ann Armero: Known as the "Kwelang Fangirl of Sarangani" and a member of the "Council," she initially had strong viewer support, partly due to an incident where Justin was accused of mocking her hygiene. However, her popularity declined later in the season amid criticisms of immaturity, alleged favoritism, and perceived lenient treatment after committing multiple violations.
- Chico Alicaya: Known as the "Striving Footballer of Cebu," he quickly bonded with Kobie over their shared interests. Although he was initially well-liked, his popularity waned after a conversation with Amanda in which he made disparaging comments about Alyssa's appearance.
- Ella Cayabyab: Known as the "Ra-Kweentera of Quezon," she gained viewer sympathy as she became increasingly isolated by the "Council" later in the season. The tension began after Andrea accused her of being overly controlling during a task practice and was exacerbated by her involvement in the Kobie-Andrea dynamic.
- Aizyl Tandugon: Dubbed the "Miss Malakas of Misamis Oriental," she was a consistent target for nominations by the "Council," being nominated every week except for one when she secured immunity. Despite early disagreements, she formed a close friendship with Ella, who later also became a target of the "Council."
- Haira Palaguitto: Called the "Makatang Marikit ng Pangasinan" ("Beautiful Poet of Pangasinan"), she was known for her friendship with Kyron and her trust in Alyssa, which eventually led to her eviction.
- Russu Laurente: Called the "Bunsong Boksingero of General Santos City," his time on PBB was marked by a confrontation with Aizyl, where she accused him of being overconfident, and by his admission of initially supporting the shutdown of ABS-CBN.

Notes

1. Glenda Victorio of Rizal was initially confirmed as one of three housemates from Kumu's public selection, but she withdrew for personal reasons. Quincy Villanueva of Laguna (the runner-up in Victorio's group) replaced her.
2. Banawis entered the House on Day 49. However, since Day 44, she was already allowed to interact all day with Housemates and also joined their weekly task virtually.

=== Housemate selection via Kumu ===
The final three housemates were selected via Kumu. 117 hopefuls competed in various series of livestream challenges in three different stages. The 9 remaining hopefuls were then divided in groups based on their traits, namely Matatag (Steadfast), Madiskarte (Resourceful), and Malakas ang Loob (Courageous). Each group competed in different weeks. The Top diamond earners in each group will become the last three housemates to enter the house for the season.

Amanda Zamora, Gail Banawis and Glenda Victorio were initially reported to be the winners of the campaign. However, due to Victorio withdrawing in her sequester, she was replaced by Quincy Villanueva, the runner-up in her team.

Kumu Housemate Selection Top 9
Name	Age	Hometown^{1}	Group	Diamonds Earned (in millions)	Result	Refs.
Gail Banawis	24	New York, USA	Malakas Ang Loob	79.53	Official Housemate	
Dale Patrick Chua	18	N/A	Malakas Ang Loob	71.26	Not Selected	
Dale Patrick Chua	18	N/A	Malakas Ang Loob	71.26	Houseguest	
Landamme Vivas	N/A	N/A	Malakas Ang Loob	10.29	Not Selected	
Amanda Zamora	19	San Juan, Metro Manila	Matatag	71.81	Official Housemate	
DJ Buddah	N/A	N/A	Matatag	42.32	Not Selected	
Alyssa Vergara	N/A	N/A	Matatag	2.43	Not Selected	
Glenda Victorio	23	Morong, Rizal	Madiskarte	95.99	~~Official Housemate~~	
Glenda Victorio	23	Morong, Rizal	Madiskarte	95.99	Houseguest	
Quincy Villanueva	26	Los Angeles, USA	Madiskarte	13.00	~~Not Selected~~	
Quincy Villanueva	26	Los Angeles, USA	Madiskarte	13.00	Official Housemate	
John Pugeda	N/A	N/A	Madiskarte	10.61	Not Selected	

Note

1. At the time of the campaign.

== Houseguests ==
Unlike those in previous seasons where houseguests normally visit the House, most of the houseguests for this season participated via video conferencing only. Sometimes, they were ordered by Big Brother to do some tasks, such as: to help, to coach, or to judge various tasks or challenges of the housemates.

Online or virtual guesting

- Coach Anne Jeline Salandanan contacted the house to coach the housemates for their weekly task and to judge their performances alongside Kim Chiu.
- Fifth Pagotan contacted the housemates, specifically the task leaders to give them advice for their Pinoy Big Digital Film weekly task with Enchong Dee as an acting consultant. Director Theodore C. Boborol, Edward Barber and Maymay Entrata contacted the house to judge the housemates' film for the weekly task.
- Nene Tamayo and Slater Young contacted the house to mentor and judge the 3 bosses and to eliminate 1 group for the 3 bosses task.
- Yamyam Gucong and Fumiya Sankai contacted the house as visitors during the P-pop Week weekly task for an undisclosed reason.

Physical guesting

- Mickey Perz, Anna Graham and Jerwin Nicomedez entered the house with Perz coaching the housemates with choreography, Graham with the females' vocals, and Nicomendez with the males' vocals for their P-pop week weekly tasks, in addition, Perz also coached the housemates virtually for a certain period of time. BINI and BGYO also visited the House.
- Kumu houseguest winners Christian Bahaya and Russco Jarviña, and Top 9 Kumu shortlisted aspiring housemates Dale Patrick Chua and Glenda Victorio entered as special houseguests who served as Big Brother's assistants in one of the Big Jump challenges.

== Tasks ==
=== Weekly tasks ===
As part of every season, weekly tasks are given in order for the housemates to earn their weekly groceries. However, as part of this season's twist, the housemates are allowed to do Kumu livestreams so that viewers can help with their weekly tasks. The diamonds (in-app gifting currency) they will earn from livestreaming can be used to purchase supplies for their tasks or to pay for minutes to practice their routines, to name a few.

Task No.	Date given	Task title and description	Result
1	December 8 (Day 3)	Floating Bridge; The housemates must create a floating bridge in the pool area using only thirteen items of their choice. However, as later known in the middle of the week, for them to get the requested items, they must first get thirteen points by shooting blocks to a basketball ring (each point is equivalent to one item; they earned only three points). For them to succeed in their first weekly task, one after another, selected eight housemates must be able to cross the bridge from one end of the pool to the other. Once all of the eight housemates were able to cross, they must cross the bridge at the same time and go back to the starting point. If anyone falls while crossing the floating bridge at any given point, they will have to go back at the start and have all the eight housemates cross the bridge again. They were given only five tries to cross the bridge.	Passed
2	December 17 (Day 12)	Connect Football; The housemates must be able to score three goals (or one hat-trick) within seven minutes and fifty seconds. In order for this to be done, the housemates must pass a football from a housemate's designated area to another one's designated area; this must be done in a predetermined sequence.	Failed
3	December 22 (Day 17)	Human Christmas Tree; The housemates must form a Christmas tree using their bodies on designated spots located in different areas of the House and they must be able to make a formation within one minute. The duration of each of the formations will vary and depend on the location. Furthermore, if the housemates stepped outside the designated Christmas tree spots, it would be considered a violation. The task would start with 7 people but the number of people forming the Christmas tree would increase every day. However, the week's nominees (Aizyl, Justin, and Mika) must always be part of the formation and they are only given five times (initially three, but was increased after winning livestream tasks) to make mistakes.	Passed
4	December 29 (Day 23)	Jump Rope; The housemates will be divided into two groups, each headed by the current week's heads of household (Ella and Haira). Each group must be able to make jump rope performances. They will only be considered successful if each group will be able to perform the following jump rope moves: basic bounce, skier, side swing, the winter, and 2-man jump. They will be given only three allowable mistakes per performance (Ella's team was given an additional three allowable mistakes after winning an advantage through a ddakji game). If a group exceeds the allowable number of mistakes, that group will fail the task. In addition, at least three persons are required to do the jump rope tricks at any given point during the performance. Each group is allotted 50% of the week's budget. In addition to the weekly budget, the group with the most successful performance will be immune from the nominations for the following week, while only the members of the other group will be allowed to be nominated. In Day 27, additional rewards will be given to either of the teams that will win: that Ella's siblings or Haira's siblings will be given gadgets for their online schooling.	Passed^{1} (only 50% of the budget)
5	January 3 (Day 29)	Pinoy Big Biker; Within five days, the housemates are tasked to cycle 1000 km using two stationary bikes (500 km for each bike) provided by Big Brother. They are only given five hours per day to do the task. However, they will have to stop every time they will encounter a roadblock; these roadblocks are given randomly. For them to return to cycling, they are required to successfully accomplish the roadblock tasks. They will have to manage their time per day since the timer will not stop for the roadblock tasks. If they fail to accomplish a roadblock task, they will be given a penalty.	Failed
6	January 11 (Day 37)	Pinoy Big Digital Film; The housemates are tasked to create a film about the life story of one housemate whose story will be chosen by the task leaders. After a story audition, task leaders Ralph and Andrea chose Jie-Ann's story. They are given only 16 straight hours to produce the film, including an 8-hour limit for minors. At the end of this designated period, they must earn an average of 80% from four judges to win the task.: Judge / Points; Director Theodore C. Boborol / 90%; Edward Barber / 87%; Maymay Entrata / 97%; Kumunity / 10%^{2}; Average / 71%	Failed^{3}
7	January 18 (Day 44)	Human Batteries; Every time they will hear the last few seconds of the season's theme song, the housemates must form a line and physically connect themselves by wrapping one's arm into another's back; they are given only ten seconds to form a line. The individuals at both ends of the line are the only people allowed to use their free hands. They are only allowed to disband once they hear the "power off" sound. With only three allowable mistakes, they will fail the task if, in any instance, they will disconnect at the wrong time and without the proper signal. Note that all the housemates are required to wear a vest with a battery-like strap placed onto it. If Big Brother instructs any of them to remove the "battery" due to any reason (e.g., failure in a task or challenge), that housemate will have to act slowly as a consequence of being "low in battery." They will also have to include a mannequin that represents Gail (Gail's live video feed can be seen in a tablet strapped in the mannequin's head) in the said task.	Passed
8	January 24 (Day 50)	3 Bosses; The three housemates (Gail, Jie-Ann, and Quincy) ranked lowest by all of them were made as bosses for a company that each of them will head for. Except for food, all companies can sell anything via Kumu livestream. The bosses will have the exclusive authority to decide on their company names and what they will sell; they are also the only persons in charge of management of the affairs of their respective companies. The bosses will also have to make their business presentations and invite the other housemates to work for them. Each boss initially selected up to four housemates only. After a presentation of the three companies to mentors Nene Tamayo and Slater Young, Jie-ann's company was dissolved because her company was not selected by either mentor. As a result, she was automatically given 2 points for the next nomination, and she and her employees were selected by the remaining bosses through arm wrestling (bunong braso) matches between members of the remaining companies. Each company was given fifteen thousand pesos (P15,000) as capital and each must earn a net profit of at least fifteen thousand pesos (P15,000) for them to win their task. In addition to the weekly budget, the group with the highest income will be immune from the nominations for the following week, while only the members of the other group will be allowed to be nominated.: Judge / Points; Nene Tamayo / 90%; Slater Young / 87%; Average / 71%	Failed^{3}
9	January 31 (Day 57)	Pinoy Big Mailbox; The housemates will receive mails that will give them several tasks that they need to perform. But prior to performing the tasks, the plasma screen in the living room area will show the requirements in who will be fit to do them. They are required not to exceed three mistakes; if they exceed that number, they will fail this weekly task.	Failed
10	February 7 (Day 64)	Big Card Castle; The housemates will build a castle made out of large playing cards and should be at least 7 feet high. The housemates should work in pairs, may use only one hand each, and must have their non-free hands connected while they are working. There is a specific build area where housemates are only permitted to work. Also, another pair should be seated on the thrones in the middle while the task is being done. This pair, which may be changed any time, may only enter and exit through a small passageway that is fixed and will be incorporated into the castle, and both of them should wear the provided crown and garments. Any violation of these results in a throne timer, set at 30 minutes at the beginning of the task, being run until the violations are fixed.	Passed
11	February 17 (Day 74)	Mga Kasabwat ni Kuya (Big Brother's Accomplices); Chosen by Kumu users, Ella and Andrea will become Big Brother's accomplices. The two will be given several missions through secret letters and they must do these tasks without the other housemates knowing that this task is their weekly task. They are allowed to make only one mistake.: No. / Mission description / Result; 1 / Liofer must separately carry Andrea and Ella around the pool for 5 laps each. After carrying each of them around the pool, Liofer must then carry the two to their beds. This task must be done before the bedtime call. / Passed; 2 / The two must convince the other housemates to vote for Amanda to become the hukom (judge). / Passed; 3 / The two must trigger Quincy to become angry or confrontational with any of them. This task must be done before the bedtime call. / Failed; 4 / The housemates are given only two hours to finish the Connect the Pipes task. If they fail this task, their weekly task will be considered a failure. The housemates must still not know the secret mission of the two. / Failed	Failed
12	February 21 (Day 78)	P-pop Week; The housemates must form two P-pop groups. They need to dance and sing three songs: one that will be performed by the boys, another by the girls, and the last by all housemates. But prior to their performances, they need to go a week-long intensive training with P-pop groups BGYO and BINI, as well as dance coach Mickey Perz and each P-pop group's voice coaches. To win this task, they need to earn 10 million Kumu diamonds from their music videos and performances until 8 pm of the day after the performances. In order of performance: 1. "Pinoy, Salamat" (performed by Amanda, Andrea, Ella, and Jie-Ann); 2. "Ikaw Ang Pinili ng Puso Ko" (performed by Chico, Kobie, Liofer, and Ralph); 3. "The Light" (performed by all housemates)	Failed
13	March 4 (Day 89)	Charity task This task will also be a special task wherein they will have to transfer 1000 ping-pong balls by fanning these balls one by one from one horshoe to another that are placed on a slanted and uneven table (later on, multiple blocks were added to make the task more difficult). If they will win this task, they will win the House of Hope Foundation, Inc. (a non-government organization that runs a charity psychiatric facility in Barangay Lumbia, Cagayan de Oro) a maximum of P50,000; 1 ball transferred is equivalent to P50. If they will successfully transfer all the ping-pong balls within the period set by Big Brother, they will win their weekly budget.	Failed (earned P48,800)

Notes

1. The housemates received only 50% of their budget after Ella's team committed 6 mistakes, which was their maximum number of allowable mistakes. The other 50% was forfeited after Haira's team committed 10 mistakes, which was more than their 3 allowable mistakes.
2. The housemates can earn 1% for every 500 thousand diamonds. However, they earned only 10%, equivalent to 5 million diamonds. To reach the average of 80%, they would have needed at least 46%, equivalent to 23 million diamonds.
3. Despite failing to win their weekly task, Big Brother still gave 71% of their weekly budget as a reward for their efforts for the weekly task.

=== Other tasks ===
Aside from the weekly tasks, the housemates were also given other significant tasks. These tasks usually involve rewards for someone special, some may include nomination or eviction twists as a consequence of failing such tasks, some were required to be done secretly, some may involve a combination of two or more types of tasks, or very difficult punishments.

Task No.	Date Given	Type	Task title and description	Participants	Result
1	December 6 (Day 1)	Safety or reward task	Liwanag at Ligaya ng Pasko (Light and Joy of Christmas); Using thirteen wooden platforms from the garden, the housemates must bring a big electric plug and light up a Christmas tree located in the activity area. While performing the task, any of the parts of their bodies were not allowed to touch the floor; they were also required to finish the task within 10 minutes. If they failed to finish the task, three housemates will be nominated for eviction.	All Housemates	Passed
2	December 7 (Day 2)	Series of secret tasks	5 Secret Tasks; In order for the isolated housemates to finally join the other housemates in the House, they must succeed in finishing three out of five tasks. It was also revealed that their isolation were made to mirror three more other housemates' current situation who are yet to be revealed and who are currently isolated and quarantined due to the show's health protocols against COVID-19.: No. / Task title and description / Result; 1 / Task of finding a tablet without letting others finding out of their secret task. After the housemates got the dummy tablet and failed to find the real tablet, Chico was tasked to help the three isolated housemates. / Failed; 2 / After having made two separate 10-minute video calls without having the other housemates noticing them, the isolated housemates must be able to memorize the personal backgrounds of Alyssa and Liofer, as these information will be used in a quiz that will be given to them. For them to succeed in this task, they must get at least 7 correct answers to each of the two housemates' personal backgrounds. / Passed; 3 / After having made two separate 10-minute video calls without having the other housemates noticing them, the isolated housemates must be able to memorize the personal backgrounds of Alyssa and Liofer, as these information will be used in a quiz that will be given to them. For them to succeed in this task, they must get at least 7 correct answers to each of the two housemates' personal backgrounds. / Passed; 4 / Crismar be must be able to sneak Alyssa and Liofer into the isolation area without letting the other housemates in the House know. / Passed; 5 / Crismar, with the help of Andrea and Ella, must be able to sneak food and eating utensils of Alyssa and Liofer into the Isolation Area without letting the other housemates in the House know. / Passed	Andrea, Crismar and Ella (Isolated Housemates)	Passed
3	December 18 (Day 13)	Secret reward task	Football Juggling; Chico and Kobie must do football juggles around a designated area. Each of them must complete one round of football juggle, and then kick the ball for a goal. Later in the middle of the task, the level of difficulty is increased: one must do a round of football juggle; once completed, he must then pass it to the other for him to do a goal. Each of them is required to do 50 goals for a total of 100 goals. Prior to the start of the challenge, Chico and Kobie were instructed separately that this task is a secret sacrifice task for the other. The rewards were: to let Chico's father see him perform their weekly task, and to let Kobie talk with his father.	Chico, Kobie	Passed
4	December 23 (Day 18)	Reward task	Connect Gifts (Sleigh task); The housemates must be able to make 2020 laps while pulling a big sleigh (that contains their gifts for their respective families; the sleigh also weighs 632 kilos) through a provided track around the activity area. They must be able to do the task within two days. Only two housemates are allowed to pull the sleigh at each time. Later on, the number of rounds is decreased to 1545 laps after they have managed to win a task during their Kumu livestream. Also, the other housemates decided to secretly sacrifice their gifts in order to make the sleigh lighter. Acting on Alyssa's suggestion, they prioritized the gifts of Aizyl, Haira, Jie-Ann, and Liofer.	All Housemates	Passed
5	January 26 (Day 52)	Safety task	Delika-dos; The housemates have to stack-up cups up to 13 levels on top of a table. Once they are successful in stacking up the cups, they will then have to transfer the tabletop to another spot without having any of the cups fall down. If successful, just like in other evictions, only one housemate will be evicted during the eviction night; if not, two housemates will be evicted.	All Housemates	Passed
6	February 16–20 (Days 73-77)	Punishment	Connect the Pipes; Owing to the total of 56 violations committed by the housemates, they were required to transfer 56 pingpong-sized balls falling from the pipes in the activity area to a container placed at the garden by using only the pipes placed on their respective helmets. A housemate is not allowed to move by foot once the ball is already on his head (note that they may transfer several balls in one go). Upon reaching the pool area, they will then have to transfer the balls to a scale provided until the said scale tilts to an equilibrium. As each ball represents an item taken by Big Brother, every ball they will successfully transfer is equivalent to an item Big Brother will return to them. They can only proceed to the activity area upon Big Brother's signal. Note that each of the housemates are also wearing orange vests with pockets, some of which contain weights. The number of weights each housemate is wearing depends on the number of violations each has committed.	All Housemates	Failed (38 balls transferred)

== Challenges ==
=== Heads of Household ===
Every week, each of the Housemates will undergo challenges to become one of the two Heads of Household. Becoming a Head of Household will earn them immunity from being nominated in that particular week.

For the fourth Heads of Household challenge, the Padaluck twist was implemented. It gave an advantage to a housemate who had received the most Kumu gifts.

Challenge No.	Date given	Challenge title and description	Heads of Household
1	December 6 (Day 1)	KUMU livestream Prior to the entry of the first 12 housemates, they were given a challenge to do livestreams. Unknown to them, the two housemates who have earned the most livestream gifts will become the Heads of Household. The winners were only revealed during their entry to the house in the launch night.	Kyron, Mika
2	December 16 (Day 11)	Bucket of Water; In the first part of the challenge, in pairs, the housemates must hold and carry with them a bucket of water. Their hands are not allowed to move away from the bucket unless instructed by Big Brother. If in any case a hand moved away from the bucket, a glass of water will be deducted from the volume of a pair's bucket. At the end of this part, the water in the bucket will be used as an initial load to the drum they are to use in the second part of the challenge. In the second part of the challenge, the pairs must transfer a bucket of water to an empty drum. Except for their hands, they must use their bodies to transfer the water to their respective buckets. The pair with the most water transferred within three minutes wins the Heads of Household titles.	Kyron, Russu
3	December 28 (Day 22)	Larong Loro (Parrot Game); Each of the housemates must memorize the exact order of the sounds of the animals flashed on the screen. After memorizing the animals, they must traverse a series of platforms and must reach the end point. If in any point they fell from a platform, they will be penalized (additional time will be given). At the end point, they will parrot or make the sounds of the animals they have memorized in the right order. If they cannot be able to parrot the sounds in the correct order, they may return to the starting point to see again the chronological order of the animals. The two housemates with the fastest time to parrot the sounds correctly in the right order will become the Heads of Household for this week.	Ella, Haira
4	January 12 (Day 37)	Four Sisters and a Wedding; Individually, the housemates were required to watch a scene from the movie Four Sisters and a Wedding. After watching it, they were then informed that they have to gather five items by answering five questions correctly. However, to gather the items, they will have to use a boom microphone to pick the items and place these items in a box corresponding to the question being asked. The two housemates with the fastest time to finish the challenge will become the Heads of Household for the week. Padaluck recipient: Andrea (will have to answer three questions only)	Andrea, Liofer
5	January 19–21 (Days 45-47)	Supercharged Challenges; The housemates will have to battle with each other in a series of challenges. The first challenge will determine who will sit on the Heads of Household thrones. In the succeeding challenges, only two housemates who will get one of the two flags may challenge one of the occupants of the two thrones; the one being challenged will then choose between the two challengers in whom he will compete (the one not chosen will automatically be included in the group of housemates who may be nominated). Each housemate has three chances to get a flag and challenge the current throne holder. If a challenger succeeds, he will replace the current holder. The losing housemate also loses his battery and can become nominated in the next nomination. At the end of all the challenges, the last two standing housemates will become Heads of Household for two weeks. Note that the names stricken out in the table were the ones who were able to get one of the flags, but were not chosen by the throne occupants to battle with.: No. / Description / Challenger / Challenged / Winner; 1 / The housemates had to transfer all 300 balls scattered in a designated area to a container using only their elbows. The two fastest housemates to finish the challenge will become the two Heads of Household throne occupants. As a twist, they were all later informed that the current holders of the HoH thrones may still be removed and be replaced by winning other challenges. Padaluck recipient: Amanda (will have to transfer 200 balls instead of 300) / All Housemates (except Quincy) / None / Ella, Alyssa; 2 / In this versus challenge between the challenger and the throne occupant, each will have to staple a given set of the housemates' photos to form a banner and connect them between two separate poles. The photos must be arranged according to the housemates' age (youngest to oldest) and must be stapled one by one. The first to finish will occupy the challenged throne. / Haira; ~~Jie-Ann~~ / Ella / Ella; 3 / In this versus challenge between the challenger and the throne occupant, each will have to staple a given set of the housemates' photos to form a banner and connect them between two separate poles. The photos must be arranged according to the housemates' age (youngest to oldest) and must be stapled one by one. The first to finish will occupy the challenged throne. / Jie-Ann; ~~Kobie~~ / Alyssa / Alyssa; 4 / Each housemate must hit the other housemate with colored balloons (a blue balloon will give them one point, while a red one will give them two points). But in order for them to get a balloon, they must first do a bottle flipping challenge in a turn-based format. If a housemate successfully flips a bottle, he or she gets a chance to use a blue balloon to hit the other housemate; but if he or she can do two consecutive flips, he gets a red balloon. The housemate with the most hits within an hour wins the challenge. / ~~Andrea~~; Chico / Ella / Chico; 5 / / ~~Amanda~~; Andrea / Alyssa / Alyssa	Chico, Alyssa

=== Ligtask ===
The Ligtask challenge, carried over from previous seasons, were usually held in lieu of the Heads of Household challenge.

Before the Ligtask challenge, the public has a chance (via Kumu) to give an advantage to a housemate. The advantage will be given to the housemate who has received the most "padalucks" (done through Kumu's livestream gifting system). At the end of the challenge, the winner will be saved from becoming one of the nominees.

Task No.	Date Given	Challenge description	Participants	Saved
1	January 4 (Day 28)	Each housemate must transfer a plastic bottle from point A to point B (the distance between each point is 14 feet) using only a tied pencil hanged from his or her back. They are not allowed to use their hands nor are allowed to touch the floor. The housemate with the shortest time to finish the challenge will be saved from being nominated. Padaluck recipient: Kobie (the distance he needed to make is reduced to 10 feet)	Aizyl, Crismar, Haira, Kobie, Mika, Ralph	Aizyl
2	February 1 (Day 58)	In the pool area, each housemate must dive and flip four letter coins using only their hands. Behind each coins are numbers that they will add to come up with a code to unlock a box with a numeric lock. Inside the box contains a red flag, which they need to mount on a stand beside the box in order to finish the task. The housemate with the shortest time to finish the task wins immunity. Padaluck recipient: Gail (needs to flip three letters only and may use her legs to flip the coins)	Alyssa, Gail, Kyron, Liofer, Ralph	Alyssa
3	February 8–12 (Days 65–69)	Game of Hearts Challenges; For Week 10, all housemates were automatically nominated. Each of them can, however, remove his or her status as a nominated housemate if he or she will win in any of the Ligtask challenges called the Game of Hearts Challenges. Winning a challenge bars a housemate from participating in the other succeeding challenges.: No. / Challenge title and description / Saved; 1 / MamboBOLA (Flatterer); Each housemate must place a tennis ball into a pipe. When the ball reaches the other end of the pipe, he must catapult the ball using the seesaw catapult to a basket mounted on a pole and situated 9 feet away from the end of the pipe. The two housemates with the shortest time to catapult two tennis balls will win this challenge. Padaluck recipient: Amanda (the distance of the basket is reduced to 8 feet) / Amanda, Jie-ann; 2 / Huwag ma-Fall (Don't Fall); Each housemate must need to freefall a ball from the starting point at the top layer to the bottom layer until it will shoot into a basket. There are six layers of different lengths that the ball will need to traverse, and they need to balance and maneuver all the layers together. All these six layers are connected by one column, so if one layer moves, the other layers move as well. In the event that the ball drops outside any of the layers or that the ball does not shoot to the designated basket, they will have to go back to the starting point. The two housemates with the shortest time will win this challenge. Padaluck recipients: Alyssa and Gail (the number of layers is reduced to five) / Chico, Kobie; 3 / Tinamaan Ako Sa'yo (I Fell for You); In the activity area, each housemate must hit 11 pictures in the correct sequence using golden volleyballs. In case they have forgotten the correct order, they may go and check again the correct sequence at a plasma screen at the pool area. If a housemate incorrectly hits a different picture, he or she will have to start over again from hitting the first picture. Also, they are not allowed to cross a green line situated 20 feet away from the row of pictures while throwing the volleyballs. Prior to the challenge, Amanda, Chico, Jie-Ann, and Kobie were asked by Big Brother to choose a housemate whom they wish to help for the last challenge. Amanda chose to help Quincy; Chico chose Liofer; Jie-Ann chose Alyssa; and Kobie chose Andrea. With their choices already made known, the already safe housemates were given the privilege to help by picking up the volleyballs thrown by the housemate of their choice. The four housemates with the shortest time will win this challenge, while the three remaining housemates will become the final nominees for week 10. Padaluck recipients: Gail and Quincy (need to hit only 10 pictures and the distance of the line from the pictures is reduced to 19 feet) / Andrea, Liofer, Quincy, Ralph	All Housemates	Amanda, Jie-Ann Chico, Kobie Andrea, Liofer, Quincy, Ralph
4	February 20 (Day 77)	Trios task The housemates were divided into three groups of three: first group consist of Kobie, Liofer and Ralph; second group is Amanda, Ella and Quincy; and the third group is Andrea, Chico and Jie-Ann. Each group will have one retriever and two builders. The retriever will have to collect 90 dominos in two separate rounds; while each of the two builders, in two separate rounds, will have to build the domino lines. For the first round, with the activity area as the starting point, the retriever will have to collect all the 90 dominos scattered around the garden area and bring them to the activity area. After collecting all the dominos, the first builder will then line up all the dominos from the starting point to the gold bar placed at the end of the first platform. Once all the dominos are lined up, the builder will have to tumble down all the dominos one after another until the gold bar is toppled and fall to a container. In the event that any of or all the dominos will fall without completely finishing the domino line, the builder will have to line them up from the start or from the last domino standing. If the first builder is successful in the first round, the retriever will then have to collect the second set of dominos: Ten bags (each bag has nine dominos) placed in the pool. He or she will then hand the second set of dominos to the second builder who will have to do same task the first builder did. The group with the shortest time to finish the task will be saved from eviction, while the two other groups will be the only housemates who can be nominated for eviction.	All housemates (3 groups of three)	Andrea, Chico, Jie-Ann

=== Big Jump ===
To determine this season's Big 4, all housemates participated in a series of challenges that was quite different from the Big Jump of the other previous seasons. All Big 4 slots were determined by all of these challenges—a deviation from the other seasons' Big Jump twist where the public's vote also played as a determining factor in choosing the final four. The series of challenges were called Big 4 Karapatdapat Challenges (Big 4 Worthy Challenges) and tested the housemates qualities: their self-trust, sense of camaraderie, resourcefulness and being steadfast.

Also as part of the twist, winning any of the Big 4 slot did not automatically guarantee their place for the Big Night as the winning housemates had to defend their spots against the two challengers chosen by the public to challenge them and take their positions.

Challenge No.	Date given	Challenge title and description	Result
1	March 1 (Day 86)	1st Karapatdapat Challenge — Tiwala sa Sarili (Self-trust); Moments after the 10th eviction, the housemates were first asked if they will participate in this challenge despite not knowing what the challenge will be. They were also informed that if anyone will win the challenge, they will be greatly rewarded, not knowing that the reward will be a Big 4 slot; however, if any of them will fail, a big consequence will be given to them. Among all the housemates who accepted the challenge, only Chico declined to participate. After the wake-up call on Day 86, the housemates were informed of their first challenge. They were required to throw their designated colored sandbags and make them land on a circular platform placed on top of a high pole from a designated area around the pole. They are allowed to do this challenge at any time they like within 10 hours; any sandbag that will fall during that time will not be counted. The housemate with the most sandbags remaining on top of the pole after 10 hours wins the challenge. To compensate for their height disadvantage, Andrea and Jie-Ann were allowed to use small platforms to step on.: Housemate / Amanda / Andrea / Chico / Jie-Ann / Kobie / Liofer / Ralph; Sandbags placed / / / Did not participate; Sandbags placed / 0 / 3 / Did not participate / 0 / 0 / 0 / 1	Andrea (1st Big 4 slot)
2	March 2 (Day 87)	2nd Karapatdapat Challenge — Pakikisama (Camaraderie); At the start of the challenge, each of the housemates is given a container with 20 balls. For them to reduce the balls they have at hand, they will have to transfer one ball by balancing it on a paddle to another housemate's container of their choice; this will be done by turns. While balancing their balls on a paddle, each of them will have to follow a pre-determined path while transferring the balls. In the event that a ball falls outside the paddle before being transferred, his or her chance will be forfeited for that round. The challenge will be divided into two levels: in the first level, the two housemates with the fewest balls in 10 rounds will advance to the second level; and for the second level, within an hour, the two housemates who advanced will transfer their balls now at the same time without waiting for each other's turn. The housemate with the fewest balls within an hour wins the challenge. Prior to the challenge, the housemates were first asked who they personally think had shown the most trait or sense of comradeship. If they think that that housemate has such trait, they must give that housemate a medal. Liofer received 2 medals from Jie-Ann and Kobie; Chico received 1 medal from Liofer; Jie-Ann received 2 medals from Andrea and Chico; Ralph received 1 medal from Amanda; and Kobie received 1 medal from Ralph. Because Liofer and Jie-Ann received the most medals, they were given an advantage. If used, they cannot be given any ball by any housemate in one round; this advantage can be used at any point of the challenge. Moments before the challenge, Big Brother announced that those housemates who had received any number of medal in the advantage twist may also help those other housemates who gave them their medals; they were all asked by Big Brother if they will help, but only Chico decided to take one of Jie-Ann's balls and place it in his own container, leaving Jie-Ann with 19 balls at the start of the challenge.: Housemate / / Amanda / Chico / Jie-Ann / Kobie / Liofer / Ralph; Balls at hand / Level 1 / 19 / 20 / 18 / 21 / 22 / 20; Balls at hand / Level 2 / 24 / did not advance / 13 / did not advance / did not advance / did not advance; Andrea did not participate in this challenge since she had already won the first Karapatdapat Challenge.	Jie-Ann (2nd Big 4 slot)
3	March 3 (Day 88)	3rd Karapatdapat Challenge — Madiskarte (Resourceful); Prior to the challenge, Big Brother asked the housemates to collectively vote for a housemate who they think is the pinaka-madiskarte or the most resourceful; the one who got the majority of votes will receive an advantage in the challenge. All the housemates, aside from Liofer himself, voted for Liofer. For this challenge, each housemate had to be resourceful in building a panungkit or a pole using only the items found in the House; they were given only 5 minutes to collect the items they think are needed to build a pole. Using their poles, they will have to pick four bags placed on a table across the center of the swimming pool; each bag contains a colored set of six tower puzzles. After all bags are collected, they will have to proceed to the build area in order to solve and build their tower puzzles (all towers need to have the same height but the pieces are of unequal lengths). Every time a correct set of 6-towers are built, a ring will be placed above it in order to become the platform for the next set of tower puzzles. If they feel that another housemate is inching closer to completely finishing their own set of towers, they may raise their red flag in order to throw a block and have the chance to destroy that housemate's tower puzzles; a flag may be used anytime in the challenge and if used, all housemates have to temporarily stop while the one who used the flag has enough time to attempt to destroy another's puzzles. As an advantage for being voted as the most resourceful housemate, Liofer is given a two-minute headstart. A housemate who completes all the four levels of the 6-tower puzzles wins the challenge. Only Chico used his red flag, but he is not able to destroy Liofer's tower. Kobie attempted to use his red flag, however he wasn't given the chance to destroy a tower of his choice as Liofer simultaneously finished his tower.	Liofer (3rd Big 4 slot)
4	March 5 (Day 90)	4th Karapatdapat Challenge — Matatag (Steadfast); Prior to the challenge, the housemates and the Kumu houseguests were asked who they think among the housemates who did not won any Big 4 slot yet is the strongest or most steadfast. Chico (Kumu houseguests' choice) and Kobie (the housemates' choice) received the most votes and were given an advantage in the upcoming challenge: a 5-minute rest which they can use until the third platform only. In this challenge, the housemates' endurance and balance will be tested. Each will have to step on four circular, elevated platforms: the first platform having the widest diameter and the last having the smallest diameter. The size of their respective platforms were customized according to the size of their feet. They will have to stand for 1 hour for the first platform, 2 hours and 30 minutes for the second platform, 3 hours for the third platform, and indefinitely for the last platform; also later in the last platform, they were required to balance using only one of their feet. But prior from moving to one platform to another, they are given 30 seconds to prepare; within the 30 seconds window, they are also allowed to step on the floor. The last housemate to stay on top of the platform wins the challenge.	Kobie (4th Big 4 slot)

=== Challengers ===
There were four Big 4 Karapatdapat Challenges that were played by the seven remaining housemates, each of which determined a holder for a certain Big 4 spot. Unknown to all of them, with four housemates taking the Big 4 spots, the three others who failed to take any of those spots were automatically nominated and had to face the public vote. The two housemates with the highest number of public votes were given a chance to stay and challenge the Big 4 while the housemate with the least vote was evicted.

As challengers, with their identity being hidden to the Big 4, they were required to challenge two housemates. In order for them to win and take any of the Big 4 slots, they must choose and defeat two of the current Big 4 occupants. Failure would mean automatic eviction.

The challenger challenges given by Big Brother were a combination of previous challenges the housemates had participated throughout this season and were exclusively chosen by the public via Kumu.

Amanda and Ralph drew of lots to determine the order of who will they pick to challenge: Amanda got the 2nd and 4th picks while Ralph got the 1st and 3rd picks. Ralph chose Andrea first for the first pick and Kobie for the third pick; Amanda chose Jie-Ann for the second pick and Liofer for the fourth pick. Their identities were revealed prior to the challenge. Before they made themselves known to the housemates, Amanda is known as the white challenger, while Ralph is known as the black challenger.

Challenge No.	Date given	Challenge title and description	Challenged	Challenger
5	March 8 (Day 93)	Transfer the Cup Tower Task; This challenge is a combination of three challenges or tasks that they have done before: the second Ligtask challenge, the first Supercharged Heads of Household challenge, and the deli-kados challenge. For the first part, they must add three four-digit numbers found at the back of three lettered circles; the sum of these numbers will be used to unlock a black box that contains several red small cups. During this part, audio clips of ex-housemate Justin were played to distract the housemates while they attempted to get the sum of the numbers. After unlocking the black box, each of them will have to get 105 small cups from the box and place them at the blue table. Afterwards, each of them will have to transfer the cups at the yellow table top and stack them all in order to form a 14-layer cup tower by using only their elbows. After successfully stacking up the cups, he or she will have to transfer the yellow table top to another table found 20 feet across. In case the cups tumble down while transferring the yellow table top, he or she needs to return to the initial position of the table, and he or she will be allowed to use his or her hands to stack up all the cups again. Once the table top is transferred while keeping the 14 cup tower intact, he or she will need to push the buzzer in order to end the challenge.	Andrea (1 hr 1 min)	Ralph (6 hrs 22 min)
5	March 8 (Day 93)		Kobie (1 hr 5 min)	Ralph (6 hrs 22 min)
6	March 9 (Day 94)	Catapult Pipe Task; Similar to the previous challenger challenge, this will also be a combination of three challenges or tasks that they have done before: the Trios task in the fourth Ligtask challenge, the Connect the Pipes task in their last punishment, and the first Game of Hearts challenge. For this challenge, they will have to build a domino line composed of 80 dominoes that will follow a zigzag pattern outlined on top of a black bench; the last piece for this domino line should be a gold bar. After building the domino line, they will have to build a pipeline from a ring to the domino line. Each of them may choose to build the domino line first or to connect the pipes first. To tumble the domino line at the black platform, they will have to place a ball into a pipe in order for it to fall into a seesaw, and use the seesaw as a catapult to shoot the ball into the said ring. When the ball is shot into the ring, the ball will have to fall into the series of pipes that each of them have connected. The ball should be able to reach the black platform and tumble down all the 80 dominoes one after another until the gold bar is toppled and will fall into a container. In the event that any of or all the dominos will fall without completely finishing the domino line, he or she will have to line them up from the start or from the last domino standing.	Jie-Ann (4 hrs 51 min)	Amanda (2 hrs 51 min)
6	March 9 (Day 94)		Liofer (57 min)	Amanda (2 hrs 51 min)

=== Big 4 Tasks ===
During the final days of the season, Big Brother gave the finalists a task. Each task can grant either extra votes to save or the deduction and transfer of vote to evict.

Task No.
Date Given
Challenge description
1
March 11
(Day 95)
While traversing a path, the housemates will have to balance a ball using an arc-shaped handheld device. If a ball falls or they step out of the path, they must return to the start. At the end of the path, there is a golden chest containing colored pencils. Each time that they can place a ball into a container near the chest, they need to get a pencil of the color corresponding to their assigned color and make it stand still on an image of the show's eye logo. Each pencil placed is equivalent to 50 votes.

Only one finalist at a time can travel along the path.

The task is later modified so that housemates can finish transferring balls first before handling pencils.

Housemate	Andrea	Jie-Ann	Kobie	Liofer
Pencils placed				
Pencils placed	22	10	41	86

2
March 13
(Day 98)
In the pool, black rings are scattered on the floor. The housemates are given a short time during the pencils task to decide if they will swim and get black rings. Each black ring is equivalent to 500 evict votes, which they can give to a housemate of their choosing.

Housemate	Andrea	Jie-Ann	Kobie	Liofer
Rings Collected				
Rings Collected	Did not Participate			

== Nomination History ==
Note that the production team of show does not tally the launch night as Day 1. For the purposes of uniformity with the other previous season articles, the launch night is marked as Day 1, not the day after it. The days reflected in this article were always numbered a day ahead compared to that as shown in the program.

	Launch night	#1	#2	#3	#4	#5	#6	#7	Game of Hearts	#9	Rank-based	Big 4 Karapatdapat Challenges		Big Night	Nomi- nations received
	Launch night	#1	#2	#3	#4	#5	#6	#7	#8	#9	#10	#11	#12	Big Night	Nomi- nations received
Eviction Day and Date	—	Day 22 Dec. 27	Day 29 Jan. 3	Day 36 Jan. 10	Day 43 Jan. 17	Day 50 Jan. 24	Day 57 Jan. 31	Day 64 Feb. 7	Day 71 Feb. 14	Day 78 Feb. 21	Day 85 Feb. 28	Day 92 Mar. 7	Day 95 Mar. 10	Day 99 Mar. 14	Nomi- nations received
Nomination Day and Date	—	Day 16; Dec. 21	Day 23; Dec. 28	Day 31; Jan. 5	Day 38; Jan. 12	Day 49; Jan. 23	Day 53; Jan. 27	Day 58; Feb. 1	Day 70; Feb. 13	Day 77; Feb. 20	Day 81; Feb. 24	Day 91; Mar. 6	—	Day 95; Mar. 10	Nomi- nations received
Liofer	Not in the House	Mika; Jie-Ann	Crismar; Alyssa	Mika; Crismar	Aizyl; Alyssa	Not eligible	Ella; Amanda	No nominations	No nominations	Ella; Quincy	1st 13 pts.	No nominations	Finalist	Winner	17
Andrea	No nominations	Aizyl; Alyssa	Crismar; Liofer	Crismar; Haira	Aizyl; Ella	Not eligible	Ella; Gail	No nominations	No nominations	Ella; Quincy	3rd-4th 35 pts.	No nominations	Finalist	Runner-up	40
Kobie	No nominations	Justin; Alyssa	Mika; Crismar	Crismar; Mika	Ella; Jie-Ann	Not eligible	Ella; Gail	No nominations	No nominations	Quincy; Ella	6th 39 pts.	No nominations	Finalist	3rd place	50
Jie-Ann	No nominations	Aizyl; Ella	Russu; Crismar	Crismar; Haira	Ella; Aizyl	Not eligible	Ella; Aizyl	No nominations	No nominations	Ella; Quincy	2nd 22 pts.	No nominations	Finalist	4th place	29
Amanda	Not in the House				Exempt	Not eligible	Ella; Ralph	No nominations	No nominations	Ella; Kobie	7th 51 pts.	No nominations	Challenger	Evicted (Day 95)	54 (+1)
Ralph	Not in the House	Exempt	Aizyl; Russu	Mika; Kobie	Aizyl; Haira	Not eligible	Aizyl; Ella	No nominations	No nominations	Ella; Quincy	5th 36 pts.	No nominations	Challenger	Evicted (Day 95)	41 (+2)
Chico	No nominations	Mika; Crismar	Crismar; Mika	Mika; Crismar	Alyssa; Ella	Aizyl; Ella	Andrea; Aizyl	No nominations	No nominations	Ella; Quincy	3rd-4th 35 pts.	No nominations	Evicted (Day 92)		36 (+1)
Ella	No nominations	Liofer; Aizyl	Crismar; Russu	Crismar; Kobie	Aizyl; Crismar	Not eligible	Andrea; Jie-Ann	No nominations	No nominations	Quincy; Kobie	8th 57 pts.	Evicted (Day 85)			99 (+2)
Quincy	Not in the House					Exempt	Ella; Ralph	No nominations	No nominations	Ralph; Ella	Evicted (Day 78)				9
Alyssa	Not in the House	Aizyl; Crismar	Crismar; Aizyl	Crismar; Haira	Aizyl; Ella	Haira; Kyron	Ella; Aizyl	No nominations	No nominations	Evicted (Day 71)					7 (+1)
Gail	Not in the House					Virtually in the House	Kobie; Jie-Ann	No nominations	No nominations	Evicted (Day 71)					2 (+2)
Kyron	Co-Head of Household	Aizyl; Jie-Ann	Russu; Crismar	Kobie; Mika	Aizyl; Chico	Not eligible	Ella; Aizyl	No nominations	Evicted (Day 64)						2 (+2)
Aizyl	No nominations	Mika; Andrea	Crismar; Mika	Crismar; Mika	Crismar; Kyron	Not eligible	Amanda; Ralph	Evicted (Day 57)							44 (+1)
Haira	No nominations	Aizyl; Alyssa	Crismar; Russu	Crismar; Kobie	Aizyl; Ella	Not eligible	Evicted (Day 50)								10 (+1)
Crismar	No nominations	Aizyl; Haira	Russu; Kyron	Haira; Kobie	Ella; Aizyl	Evicted (Day 43)									40
Mika	Co-Head of Household	Aizyl; Liofer	Russu; Aizyl	Haira; Kobie	Evicted (Day 36)										20
Russu	No nominations	Justin; Mika	Crismar; Aizyl	Evicted (Day 29)											11
Justin	No nominations	Aizyl; Haira	Evicted (Day 22)												4
Notes	^{1}	^{2,} ^{3}	^{None}	^{4,} ^{5}	^{6}	^{7,} ^{8,} ^{9}	^{10,} ^{11,} ^{12}	^{13,} ^{14}	^{15}	^{None}	^{16}	^{17}^{,18}	^{19}	^{None}	
Heads of Household	Kyron; Mika	Kyron; Russu	Ella; Haira	None	Andrea; Liofer	Alyssa; Chico		None						Open voting	
Ligtask Winners	No eviction	Not implemented		Aizyl	Not implemented			Alyssa	Amanda; Andrea; Chico; Jie-Ann; Kobie; Liofer; Quincy; Ralph	Andrea; Chico; Jie-Ann	Not implemented			Open voting	
Up for eviction	No eviction	Aizyl; Justin; Mika	Aizyl; Crismar; Russu	Crismar; Haira; Kobie; Mika	Aizyl; Alyssa; Crismar; Ella	Aizyl; Ella; Haira; Kyron	Aizyl; Andrea; Ella; Jie-Ann	Gail; Kyron; Liofer; Ralph	Alyssa; Ella; Gail	Ella; Kobie; Quincy; Ralph	Amanda; Ella	Amanda; Chico; Ralph	Andrea; Kobie; Ralph Amanda; Jie-Ann; Liofer	Open voting	
Vetoed	No eviction	No PoV					Andrea; Jie-Ann	Liofer	No PoV					Open voting	
Saved from eviction	No eviction	Aizyl; 12.64% Mika; 3.30%	Aizyl; 14.90% Crismar; 6.87%	Haira; 14.78% Kobie; 14.56% Crismar; 2.98%	Ella; 12.94% Aizyl; 7.47% Alyssa; 3.29%	Ella; 16.87% Kyron; 9.38% Aizyl; 8.13%	Ella; 12.68%	Gail; 16.18% Ralph; 13.70%	Ella; 23.22%	Ella; 14.37% Kobie; 12.01% Ralph; 6.81%	Amanda; 38.75%	Amanda; 31.79% Ralph; 5.66%	Andrea; 1 hr, 1 min Kobie; 1 hr, 5 min Liofer; 57 min Jie-ann; 4 hrs, 51 min	Liofer; 20.90%	
Evicted	No eviction	Justin –2.00%	Russu; 4.39%	Mika; 1.66%	Crismar; 2.60%	Haira; 2.61%	Aizyl; 12.61%	Kyron; 11.19%	Gail; 7.42% Alyssa –1.26%	Quincy; 5.84%	Ella –9.37%	Chico –6.12%	Ralph; 6 hrs, 22 min Amanda; 2 hrs, 51 min	Andrea; 16.60% Kobie; 3.36% Jie-Ann; 2.66%	
References															

Legend

Housemate received immunity after becoming a Head of Household.
Housemate received immunity after winning or finishing a task or challenge; exempt from the nominations due to being a new entrant.
Housemate received immunity after winning the Ligtask challenge.
Housemate received automatic nomination from Big Brother after failing a task, a challenge or as a result of a twist.
Housemate was voted by the public to challenge the reigning Big 4.
Finalist was challenged by a challenger.
Orange name Housemate received extra nomination points from Big Brother after failing a task, a challenge or as a result of a twist.
Red name Housemate received an automatic nomination from another housemate.

Notes

1. Kyron and Mika were given the Head of Household (HoH) titles after gaining the most Kumu diamonds in their respective Kumu livestreams (the livestreams were made prior to their entry to the House). The HoH titles were given to them prior to the entry of the 10 other housemates. In addition, the housemates were given a task wherein their failure would lead to an instant nomination of three housemates decided by the Heads of Household. However, the housemates can void the said instant nominations by succeeding in their task. The housemates succeeded in their task, which led to having no nominations.
2. The nominations took place on Day 15 (December 20), but was announced the night after as the December 20 episode was preempted by ABS-CBN's Christmas Special.
3. Ralph was exempted from the nominations for being a new entrant. He entered the House on Day 15, the day when the first nominations took place.
4. As a consequence, the nominees were limited only to Haira's team (Aizyl, Crismar, Haira, Kobie, Mika, Ralph and Russu) after they failed to win the jump rope task challenge; Ella's team (Alyssa, Andrea, Chico, Ella, Jie-Ann, Kyron and Liofer) was immune from the nominations. Aizyl, however, was saved from the nominations after winning the Ligtask challenge.
5. The nominations took place on Day 30 (January 4) and was done pre-recorded; it was aired on the next day (January 5).
6. Amanda was exempted from the nominations for being a new entrant. She entered the House on Day 36 right after Mika got evicted.
7. Quincy was exempted from the nominations for being a new entrant. She entered the House on Day 43. Gail, on the other hand, was introduced later in the week to the housemates; the housemates were virtually allowed to interact with her via a tablet. However, at that time, she has not yet entered the House as she was still finishing her quarantine after contracting COVID-19.
8. Alyssa and Chico, who won the Heads of Household's Supercharged Challenges, were immune for two weeks.
9. Alyssa and Chico were given the Supercharged Power for winning as the new Heads of Household. It gave them the power to exclusively nominate two housemates each for eviction for this particular week. The other housemates were ineligible to vote, but may be voted by Alyssa or Chico. If in any case, Chico had already chosen a specific housemate, Alyssa cannot nominate that particular housemate and instead must choose another. Housemates that were given automatic nomination by either of the two were given red flags in a face-to-face nomination.
10. Gail was not exempted from the nominations despite being a new entrant. This was due to the fact that she already had a week of interaction with the housemates as a virtual housemate.
11. As punishment, Jie-Ann received an additional two points from Big Brother for the nominations after she failed to get a mentor for her company during their weekly task; this was given to her before the nomination process had started.
12. Andrea and Jie-Ann were saved from the nominations, after Alyssa saved Andrea and Chico saved Jie-Ann by exercising their new given power, the Power of Veto.
13. Team Dreamer Connect (composed of Quincy as boss; with members: Amanda, Andrea, Chico, Ella, Jie-Ann, and Kobie) won in the last week's weekly task against Team Survibin (composed of Gail as boss; with members: Aizyl, Alyssa, Kyron, Liofer, and Ralph). As a result, the members of Team Dreamer Connect will be immune for the next nominations; while the nominees will be taken from the members of Team Survibin only.
14. Alyssa won the Ligtask challenge, saving herself from being nominated; Liofer received the Power of veto medallion from Team Dreamer Connect, saving himself from the nominations. With only three housemates (Gail, Kyron and Ralph) left for nominations, there was no need for a nomination process; the last three not saved from the ligtask challenge and not given the power of veto medallion were immediately included in the final list of nominees.
15. All housemates were automatically nominated as part of this week's twist; they can save themselves through a series of ligtask of challenges: the Game of Hearts Challenges. The following eviction was a double eviction.
16. For the 10th nominations, the nominations were based on the ranking given by the housemates to each other (including each of themselves). The six housemates with the fewest points will be safe from the eviction, while the last 2 housemates will be part of the list of nominees. For the full detail of the result in this nominations, see Rank-based nomination result.
17. All the Big 4 slots were determined via a series of challenges called Big 4 Karapatdapat Challenges. Andrea won the first challenge; Jie-Ann, the second; Liofer, the third; and Kobie, fourth.
18. The three housemates who did not win any of the Big 4 Karapatdapat Challenges were automatically nominated; the two housemates who will be saved in this eviction round will be named "Challengers".
19. The challengers named by the public will challenge two finalists of their choice in a challenge. The challengers are required to defeat both finalists that they challenge in order to steal a spot in the Big 4.

=== Power of Veto ===
The Power of Veto was a power given to the winner of certain tasks. The holder of the power is given the chance to automatically save a nominee of their choice from the list of nominees. If the power was given to a group, the group will decide which nominee gets vetoed via a collective vote.

Unlike its American counterpart, no replacement nominee was required to be named making the power controversial among viewers.

	#6	#7
Voting Day and Date	Day 53; Jan. 29	Day 58; Feb. 3
Alyssa	Andrea	Ineligible to vote
Amanda	Ineligible to vote	Liofer
Andrea	Ineligible to vote	Ralph
Chico	Jie-Ann	Liofer
Ella	Ineligible to vote	Gail
Gail	Ineligible to vote	Ineligible to vote
Jie-Ann	Ineligible to vote	Liofer
Kobie	Ineligible to vote	Liofer
Kyron	Ineligible to vote	Ineligible to vote
Liofer	Ineligible to vote	Ineligible to vote
Quincy	Ineligible to vote	Liofer
Ralph	Ineligible to vote	Ineligible to vote
Aizyl	Ineligible to vote	Evicted (Day 57)
Notes	^{1}^{,}^{2}	^{3}
Original Nominees	Aizyl; Andrea; Ella; Jie-Ann	Gail; Kyron; Liofer; Ralph
Vetoed	Andrea; Alyssa's choice to save Jie-Ann; Chico's choice to save	Liofer; 5 of 7 votes to save
Remained Nominated	Aizyl; Ella not selected	Gail; 1 of 7 votes to save Ralph; 1 of 7 votes to save Kyron; 0 of 7 votes to save

Legend

Housemate received the power of veto medallion and was removed from the list of nominees.
Housemate remained in the list of nominees after not receiving the power of veto medallion.

Notes

1. Being the Heads of Household, Alyssa and Chico each have the power to veto. Thus, needing no collective vote for a veto.
2. Quincy was exempted from the nomination process as she is still a new entrant.
3. Amanda, Andrea, Chico, Ella, Jie-Ann, Kobie and Quincy (Team Dreamer Connect) won the last week's competition. Each may vote to veto among Gail, Kyron, Liofer and Ralph who they will save; the housemates with the most votes wins the power of veto medallion.

=== Rank-based nomination result ===
For the 10th nomination week, the list of nominees was based on the housemates' rankings. Each housemate will rank all remaining housemates, including themselves. Each rank will receive a specific number of points: the first will receive 1 point; the second with 2 points; and so on until the eighth with 8 points. The total points received by each housemate will determine the final ranking; the housemates in the first six ranks will be saved from becoming part of the final list of nominees, while the housemates who receive the most points will be in the last two ranks and will become the official nominees for the week.

The housemates did not know that their rankings were the basis of this week's nomination until Big Brother mentioned this to them before the announcement of the rankings.

Note that the underlined names in the table below were the rank of the housemates they gave to themselves.

Voter	1st	2nd	3rd	4th	5th	6th	7th	8th
Amanda	Liofer	Andrea	Kobie	Amanda	Chico	Ralph	Jie-Ann	Ella
Andrea	Liofer	Jie-Ann	Kobie	Andrea	Ralph	Amanda	Ella	Chico
Chico	Jie-Ann	Liofer	Chico	Kobie	Ralph	Andrea	Amanda	Ella
Ella	Liofer	Ella	Ralph	Jie-Ann	Andrea	Amanda	Kobie	Chico
Jie-Ann	Liofer	Chico	Andrea	Jie-Ann	Ralph	Kobie	Amanda	Ella
Kobie	Liofer	Jie-Ann	Chico	Kobie	Andrea	Ralph	Amanda	Ella
Liofer	Jie-Ann	Chico	Ralph	Liofer	Andrea	Kobie	Amanda	Ella
Ralph	Jie-Ann	Liofer	Ralph	Chico	Andrea	Kobie	Amanda	Ella
Overall Rank	Liofer; 13 points	Jie-Ann; 22 points	Andrea & Chico; 35 points		Ralph; 36 points	Kobie; 39 points	Amanda; 51 points	Ella; 57 points
Reference(s)								

=== S–E voting system result ===
The following is a summary of the results of the evictions nights that had used the S-E voting system. In this system, a voter may vote to evict or to save a nominee from eviction. The votes to save are then subtracted by the votes to evict which may result in a nominee receiving a negative number of votes as seen in the first, eighth, tenth and eleventh evictions, this also results in the percentages not adding up to one hundred.

The votes were taken from the combined SMS and Kumu votes.

In the second and the succeeding eviction nights, the detailed summary was replaced by a combined net results of both votes from Kumu and SMS without further detailing the results of each medium. The percentage of Kumu's votes being 70% and that of SMS votes comprising 30% of the total votes remained the same.

Eviction No.	Nominee	Votes from Kumu (70% of votes)			Votes from SMS (30% of votes)			Total Net	Result	Refs.
Eviction No.	Nominee	To-Save	To-Evict	Net	To-Save	To-Evict	Net	Total Net	Result	Refs.
1	Aizyl	15.42%	-1.52%	13.90%	14.32%	-4.63%	9.69%	12.64%	Saved	
1	Justin	23.71%	-17.79%	5.92%	17.16%	-37.65%	-20.49%	-2.00%	Evicted	
1	Mika	23.73%	-17.83%	5.90%	11.75%	-14.50%	-2.75%	3.30%	Saved	

Eviction No.	Nominee	Votes			Result	Refs.
Eviction No.	Nominee	To-Save	To-Evict	Net	Result	Refs.
2	Aizyl	16.31%	-1.41%	14.90%	Saved	
2	Crismar	23.01%	-16.14%	6.87%	Saved	
2	Russu	23.76%	-19.37%	4.39%	Evicted	
3	Crismar	18.01%	-15.03%	2.98%	Saved	
3	Haira	15.34%	-0.55%	14.78%	Saved	
3	Kobie	15.16%	-0.60%	14.56%	Saved	
3	Mika	18.49%	-16.83%	1.66%	Evicted	
4	Aizyl	8.76%	-1.29%	7.47%	Saved	
4	Alyssa	21.54%	-18.25%	3.29%	Saved	
4	Crismar	18.29%	-15.69%	2.60%	Evicted	
4	Ella	14.56%	-1.62%	12.94%	Saved	
5	Aizyl	13.33%	-5.20%	8.13%	Saved	
5	Ella	26.70%	-9.83%	16.87%	Saved	
5	Haira	18.23%	-15.62%	2.61%	Evicted	
5	Kyron	10.24%	-0.86%	9.38%	Saved	
6	Aizyl	30.89%	-18.28%	12.61%	Evicted	
6	Ella	31.76%	-19.08%	12.68%	Saved	
7	Gail	17.64%	-1.46%	16.18%	Saved	
7	Kyron	25.15%	-13.96%	11.91%	Evicted	
7	Ralph	27.74%	-14.04%	13.70%	Saved	
8	Alyssa	8.47%	-9.73%	-1.26%	Evicted	
8	Ella	36.03%	-12.81%	23.22%	Saved	
8	Gail	20.19%	-12.77%	7.42%	Evicted	
9	Ella	20.71%	-6.34%	14.37%	Saved	
9	Kobie	13.76%	-1.75%	12.01%	Saved	
9	Quincy	14.44%	-8.60%	5.84%	Evicted	
9	Ralph	20.61%	-13.80%	6.81%	Saved	
10	Amanda	45.04%	-6.29%	38.75%	Saved	
10	Ella	19.65%	-29.02%	-9.37%	Evicted	
11	Amanda	32.68%	-0.89%	31.79%	Saved	
11	Chico	16.69%	-22.81%	-6.12%	Evicted	
11	Ralph	16.29%	-10.63%	5.66%	Saved	

== The Big Night ==
For the first time in Pinoy Big Brother history, the finale of the season, dubbed as Pinoy Big Brother: Connect @ The Big Night, was held in front of the Pinoy Big Brother House with a virtual audience. The finale also featured several guests, including past Pinoy Big Brother winners such as Nene Tamayo of Season 1, Bea Saw of Season 2, Ruben Gonzaga of Celebrity Edition 2, Ejay Falcon of Teen Edition Plus, Slater Young of Unlimited, Daniel Matsunaga of All In, Jimboy Martin of 737 Teens and Yamyam Gucong of Otso and other former housemates.

At the end of the night, Liofer Pinatacan was declared as the winner of the season. Andrea Abaya was declared as second big placer, Kobie Brown as the third big placer, and Jie-Ann Armero as the fourth big placer.

Finalist		Votes			Result	Refs.
Finalist		To-Save	To-Evict	Net	Result	Refs.
H	Andrea	30.69%	-14.09%	16.60%	2nd place	
O	Jie-Ann	3.89%	-1.23%	2.66%	4th place	
M	Liofer	33.39%	-12.49%	20.90%	Winner	
E	Kobie	3.79%	-0.43%	3.36%	3rd place	

== Official soundtrack ==
Connected Na Tayo (Ang Soundtrack Ng Bahay Mo Vol. 2)

Soundtrack album by Various artists
- Released: January 29, 2021
- Recorded: 2020
- Genres: OPM, Indie pop, Soundtrack
- Length: 19:42
- Languages: Filipino, English
- Label: Star Music
- Producer: Jem Macatuno

Star Music together with ABS-CBN created an album for this season entitled Connected Na Tayo (Ang Soundtrack Ng Bahay Mo Vol. 2) and was released on January 29, 2021. Tracks in this album are mostly composed by Otso ex-housemates Lie Reposposa, Shawntel Cruz, Jem Macatuno, and Kiara Takahashi, which includes this season's theme song and carrier track "Connected Na Tayo" and eviction theme song "Bagong Simula".

Connected Na Tayo (Ang Soundtrack Ng Bahay Mo Vol. 2)
No.	Title	Writer(s)	Artists	Length
1.	"Connected Na Tayo"	Jem Macatuno, Kiara Takahashi, Lie Reposposa, Shawntel Cruz	Jem Macatuno, Kiara, Lie Reposposa, Shawntel	3:29
2.	"Bagong Simula"	Jem Macatuno	Jem Macatuno	5:14
3.	"Ikaw, Ako, Tayo"	Joshue Dizon, Kiara Takahashi	Kiara	5:05
4.	"Kaibigan Ko"	Lie Reposposa	Lie Reposposa	3:23
5.	"Pop Goes My Pretty Big Heart"	Shawntel Cruz	Shawntel	2:29
Total length:				19:42

== Controversies and criticism ==
Just like in all other seasons, this season was not spared from controversies and criticism. One issue involves the rude behavior of one housemate towards another; another was the inclusion of two housemates who favored the shutdown of ABS-CBN; and a mechanic that was tagged as "unfair" by viewers.

This season panned by viewers as "the worst edition" in the history of PBB.

Preceded by Otso	Pinoy Big Brother: Connect (December 6, 2020–March 14, 2021)	Succeeded by Kumunity 10
