= Silliman University School of Basic Education =

Private school in Negros Oriental, Philippines

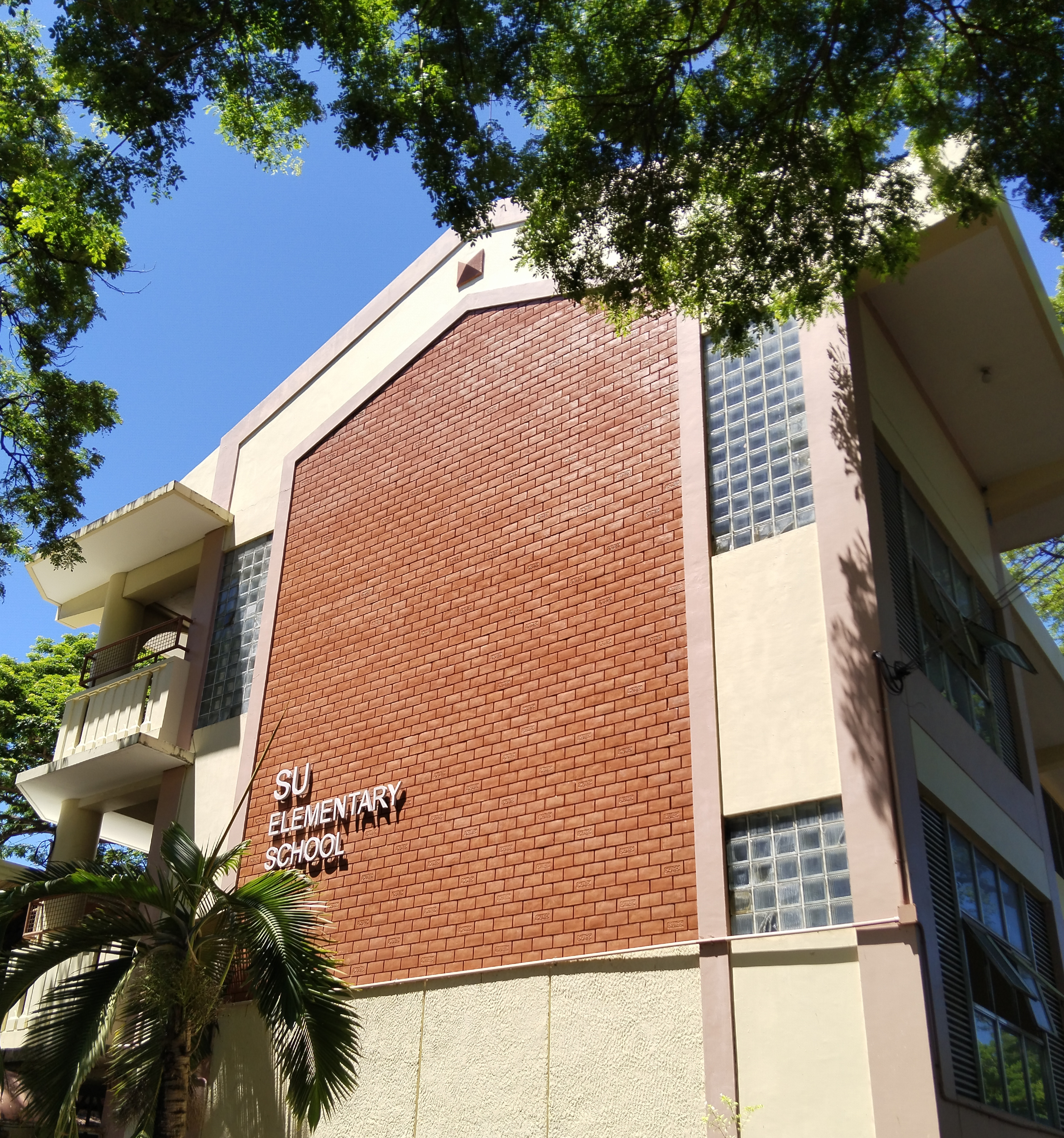

Location
- Hibbard Avenue, Dumaguete, Philippines
- Coordinates: 9°18′48″N 123°18′28″E

Information
- Type: Private
- Established: 1901 (as an elementary school); 2001 (as a consolidated unit)
- Website: www.su.edu.ph

The Silliman University School of Basic Education, abbreviated as SBE, is one of the academic units of Silliman University, a private university in Dumaguete, Philippines. The school is regulated by the Department of Education and accreditted by PAASCU.

== Academic profile ==
=== History ===
The School of Basic Education traces its origins to the year 1901 when Silliman Institute was founded as an elementary school for boys by American Presbyterian missionaries. In 1916, the first high school diplomas were awarded and way into the 1950s an early childhood school was developed. Over the years, these schools operated as separate units, but in 2001 a merger was made to form the present-day School of Basic Education. With the implementation of the K+12 curriculum of the Department of Education, Silliman offered Senior High School, placing it under the umbrella of the School of Basic Education. At present, the school is composed of the Early Childhood School, Elementary School, Junior High School and the Senior High School.

The departments within the school (early childhood, elementary, junior high and senior high) are headed by principals who report to a supervising director. Eventually, the position of director was replaced by the Associate Dean for the College of Education who now supervises the principals of these departments.

=== Programs ===
Directors of the School
Prof. Leticia R. Alcala, 2001-2007
Prof. Francisco E. Ablong, Jr., 2007 - 2011
Dr. Earl Jude Cleope, 2011–present

- Early childhood
- Elementary school
- Junior High school
- Senior High School

=== Student publications ===
- Stones and Pebbles
- Junior Sillimanian
