= Andi Abaya =

Filipino-Chinese actress (born 2002)

- Born: Andrea Dennise Lim Abaya; January 8, 2002 (age 24)
- Other name: Andrea Abaya
- Education: De La Salle University (BS)
- Occupations: Actress; singer; dancer; model
- Years active: 2020–present
- Agents: Star Hunt (2020–present); Star Magic (2021–present)

Andrea Dennise "Andi" Lim Abaya (born January 8, 2002) is a Filipino actress, singer, dancer and television personality. She made her debut on television as a housemate (contestant) of Pinoy Big Brother: Connect (2020) where she was dubbed as the "Cheerdance Sweetheart ng Parañaque" (lit. transl. Cheerdance Sweetheart of Parañaque) and finished as the runner-up.

== Early life ==
Abaya was born on January 8, 2002, and was raised in Parañaque. She attended De La Salle Santiago Zobel School and San Beda Alabang in neighboring Muntinlupa, where she was part of the school's cheerdance team. Before entering Pinoy Big Brother, she was a freshman at De La Salle University in Manila. In 2026, she graduated with a Bachelor of Science degree in Advertising Management from the said university. Abaya also appeared on various commercials and TV advertisements like Eskinol and Charmee.

== Career ==
In May 2021, Abaya was introduced as part of Dreamscape Entertainment's The Squad Plus, where she was nicknamed "Andi".

After competing in Pinoy Big Brother: Connect, Abaya landed her first ever showbusiness stint: a lead role in the film Caught in the Act (2021).

In July 2021, Abaya joined the cast of the television series Huwag Kang Mangamba as Mikay. Later that year, she was cast together with her love team Kobie Brown in iQiyi's first Filipino local original Saying Goodbye, which premiered in December 2021. They also starred in the series Love in 40 Days, which premiered in May 2022, and in the Netflix film The Entitled, which premiered in July 2022.

In June 2022, Star Magic released its first ever produced film Connected, where she starred with other Pinoy Big Brother: Connect ex-contestants.

== Filmography ==
=== Film ===
Year	Title	Role	Notes	Ref
2021	Caught In The Act	Elaine	Main role	
2022	Connected	Gabbie Verano	Main role	
2022	The Entitled	Caitlyn	Supporting role	

=== Television ===
Year	Title	Role	Notes	Ref
2020–2021	Pinoy Big Brother: Connect	Herself	Contestant; credited as "Andrea Abaya"; finished as first runner-up	
2021	Huwag Kang Mangamba	Mikay	Guest role	
2021	Saying Goodbye	Joni Canlas		
2022	Love in 40 Days	Celine De Vera	Supporting role	
2022	PIEnalo: Pera o Bayong	Herself	Celebrity player	
2022	PIE Galingan	Herself	Guest co-host	
2022	The Iron Heart	Maia	Supporting role	
2023	Teen Clash	Mandy Reyes	Supporting role	
2025	Incognito	train passenger	Guest role	
2025	Love at First Spike	Sinag Bartolome		
2025	Maalaala Mo Kaya - "Medal"	Trixia Anne Arellano	Lead role	
2025	Rainbow Rumble	Herself	Contestant	
2025–2026	What Lies Beneath	Althea Melendez	Supporting role	
2026	Miss Behave	April Javier		

== Discography ==
Singles
Year	Title	Album
2021	Nariyan Ka Lang Pala	Caught In The Act: Inner Love
2021	Tanging Hiling	Caught In The Act: Inner Love

== Awards and nominations ==
Year	Award-giving body	Category	Nominated work	Results	Reference
2021	4th Asia Pacific Luminare Awards	Most Impressive Teen Actress of The Year	The Entitled	Won	
2021	RAWR Awards 2021	Favorite Newbie (with Kobie Brown)	The Squad Plus	Nominated	
