= Kobie Brown =

Filipino actor

- Born: Kobie Rhys Literal Brown; October 12, 2003 (age 23)
- Education: Southville International School
- Occupations: Actor; Singer
- Years active: 2020-present
- Agents: Star Hunt (2020–2026); Star Magic (2021–2026); Sparkle (2026–present)
- Height: 179 cm (5 ft 10 in)

Kobie Rhys Literal Brown (born 12 October 2003) is a Filipino-British actor, singer, and television personality. He came to prominence in 2020 when he joined Pinoy Big Brother: Connect, where he was dubbed as "Charming Striker ng Parañaque" and was placed as the 3rd Big Placer. He has since appeared in various films and television series, such as Saying Goodbye (2021), Love In 40 Days (2022), Connected (2022) and The Entitled (2022) alongside his love team partner Andi Abaya.

== Early life and career ==
Brown was born on October 12, 2003, to a British dad, Andy Brown and Filipino mother, Maita Literal. He has 2 siblings, Khalil and Amaia. He attended Southville International School. He enjoys playing football.

In May 2021, Kobie was introduced as part of Dreamscape Entertainment's The Squad Plus.

Later that year, he was cast together with Abaya in iQiYi's first Filipino local original Saying Goodbye which premiered in December 2021. Also in the series Love in 40 Days, which premiered in May 2022 and in the Netflix film The Entitled, which premiered in July 2022.

In June 2022, Star Magic Studios released its first ever produced film, "Connected" with Abaya and other Pinoy Big Brother: Connect ex-housemates.

In May 2026, Kobie signed a contract with Sparkle GMA Artist Center making him part of GMA Network.

== Filmography ==
=== Film ===
Year	Title	Role	Notes	Ref
2022	Connected	Christopher "Topher" Winters	Main role	
2022	The Entitled	Bret	Cameo role	
2026	Sisa	Smith	Official for the 29th Tallinn Black Nights Film Festival Entry	

=== Television/Digital ===
Year	Title	Role	Notes	Ref
2020–2021	Pinoy Big Brother: Connect	Himself	3rd Big Placer	
2021	Saying Goodbye	Vic Wilson		
2022	Love In 40 Days	Brock Reynolds	First television role	
2022	PIE Galingan	Himself	Guest co-host	
2025	Ghosting	Vhal	Main role	
2025–2026	What Lies Beneath	Kyle Sebastian	Guest cast	
2026-present	Born to Shine	JC		
