= Pinoy Big Brother: Unlimited events =

Pinoy Big Brother: Unlimited was a Philippine reality show based on the Big Brother franchise.

Below is a chronology of events that occurred over the course of the season from October 29, 2011, to March 31, 2012. This article also lists voluntary and temporary exits, entrances of houseguests, visitors, new housemates, and other events that affected the housemates' lives inside the House. October 29, 2011 is considered Day 1.

== Week 1 ==
- Day 1: Thirteen official housemates crawled through a hole into the Big Brother house. One sub-official housemate was a mole. They were set to live in the slums, similar to how 15 million Filipinos live. Paco, Slater and Luz were asked in the confession room to choose an unlimited supply of one of the necessities of water, food and clothes. After deliberating and considering the others, they chose food.
- Day 2: Big Brother gave the housemates' first weekly task. The first challenge was to create useful things from scrap, which the housemates won. The second was for six singers to cumulatively score 540 on the Aegis ballad Luha (Tears) in Karaoke. Jaz, Kim, Pamu, Kigoy, Kevin, and Carlo volunteered to sing and won. Big Brother then asked the housemates to tell scary stories. Kevin had the scariest story and won unlimited water. Carlo was then informed of his impossible tasks. He successfully retrieved one item of clothing from Divine, Kevin, and Kigoy.
- Day 3: Big Brother scared the housemates at night with frightening noises and people in costumes. Luz, Tin, Seichang and Biggel successfully erased the word UNLIMITED painted on a wooden bench in the third challenge using only sandpaper strapped on different parts of their bodies. Carlo woke up in the early hours to try puncturing the housemates' water tank without being seen. Since his nails weren't sharp enough, he was forced to carefully tip it over and let the tank drain itself. Kigoy and Luz argued briefly over cooking rice. The housemates had to shoot basketballs backwards in the fourth challenge and score 21 out of 40. Divine was the lone scorer with one point. Big Brother gave the housemates a second chance to shoot, offering one scoop of water from a normal shot while a full container if the housemate successfully scored backwards—but cannot share the water. Only Jaz scored backwards and took a bath with the water she won.
- Day 4: Kigoy and Carlo had to fan for 24 hours continuously in the fifth challenge, which the housemates lost.
- Day 5: The housemates designed a toy house using nails in the sixth challenge. Carlo and Luz then had to remove the nails, which they did successfully.
- Day 6: In the seventh challenge, the housemates had to ride one round on a pedicab missing the sidecar's wheel. The housemates were unsuccessful and lost their weekly task. Big Brother summoned Carlo to the Confession Room and gave him one hour to finally complete the last impossible task: finding the henna tattoos. He only got three tattoos correct, but Kigoy's was incorrect. Seeing Carlo's failure, Big Brother outed Carlo to the housemates by summoning him to the confession room as the unofficial housemate. Carlo sought a second chance, prompting Big Brother to let the true housemates discuss whether to keep him—something that caused division.
- Day 7: Big Brother asked the housemates to do a rap version of "Pinoy Ako" with Biggel doing the beatbox. Each housemate was also tasked to put one item of clothing in the confession room.

== Week 2 ==
- Day 8: Carlo officially became a housemate with only one of the thirteen housemates rejecting him. At the confession room, he had to pick six rattan boxes containing one item of clothing each from the other 13 housemates. The clothes belonged to Paco, Pamu, Kevin, Jaz, Seichang, and Kim, who first occupied the second House (Industrial House). Roy was later revealed to the audience as the lone dissenter. Meanwhile, 15 new housemates entered the House in two teams. Jerico, Diane, Anatoly, Casey, Wendy, Joya, and Eting were made to dip into a pool of dirty water and assigned as street urchins and choose a housemate to pair up with. They could only communicate with their partner non-verbally (which is a special task for new housemates). Big Brother also tasked Slater to make his housemates believe that he fell for Joya at first sight.
- Day 9: At the Industrial House, Naprey was the first of the second batch to be present in that house and had to cook breakfast while the original six slept. Later, the six original housemates were summoned to the confession room to meet their new housemates. Kim was shocked that her boyfriend Mark would also be a housemate, but both were later ordered to keep their relationship secret or risk nomination. The original six housemates were told to pretend to the new housemates that they all entered at the same time. Later the housemates had to walk while crouched, the same way Naprey walks when not on his wheelchair. The success of the task resulted in Naprey being allowed to use his wheelchair. At the Slums, Eting, Joya, and Wendy decided to have unlimited food at the expense of having limited water and clothing. The Slum housemates then talked about the stories behind their heirlooms. Unknown to everyone, this was just the first part of Casey's weekly task.
- Day 10: During the wee hours in the Slums, Casey performed the dance part of her weekly task as everybody slept. At the Industrial House, Kim and Mark were allowed to spend time together while their fellow housemates slept. In the morning, aspects of Japanese culture arrived in the Industrial House, such as the housemates sitting on the floor while eating breakfast with chopsticks. The weekly task note was even written in Japanese (and had to be translated by Seichang), and the housemates also had to wrest their materials from two sumo wrestlers. Later, the male housemates dressed and acted like geishas. Back in the Slums, Kigoy's remark about cigarette smoking almost caused an argument between him, Diane, and Roy, only to be quelled by the others. Casey took opportunity of this event to recruit Joya for her secret task, claiming she saw an invisible black aura around Kigoy. In turn, Joya tried to convince Roy to join her and Casey. Later, several housemates won several items from the sari-sari store by flipping large disks, hoping they turn up the same color. Carlo and Biggel offered to wear high-heels for 24 hours continuously in exchange for Big Brother giving Kigoy a fresh pair of bakya slippers since his original pair couldn't be repaired. Kigoy also caught the group's ire because he had stolen kisses from Diane. Both of them later had a serious conversation in which Kigoy was made to understand that he has to learn to be considerate of others' thoughts and feelings. Regarding Casey's secret task, Roy finally joined the nightly ritual.
- Day 11: At the Industrial House, the women dressed themselves as sumo wrestlers in padded suits. In the sumo competition that ensued, Pamu remained undefeated against the other girls. When facing the sumo wrestlers from the day previous, the girls again won, both in two-on-one handicap matches and in a one-on-one match between Pamu and one of the wrestlers. Seichang refereed the matches. They were rewarded with a shiatsu massage while wearing blindfolds. The girl housemates were surprised to see the male housemates doing the work after taking off their blindfolds, which irked Kim because Paco chose to massage her when Mark would have jumped at the opportunity as her boyfriend. At the Slums, Big Brother assigned the housemates to do a two-minute pole dancing routine without their feet touching the floor in exchange for a special lifestyle package (which later turned out to be an unlimited supply of water and ice cream). Slater tasked Carlo to create three paper roses for Joya and Diane to deliver them to her. In Casey's secret task, Anatoly and Slater joined her group, although Slater had his doubts. Coincidentally, after the three finished their "ritual" along with Roy and Joya, Kigoy coughed while sleeping upon being touched by Casey, bringing her fears that her fabrication was becoming real.
- Day 12: In the Slums, as the last part of Casey's secret task, Big Brother specifically told her to recruit Luz and convince the latter to lift her up during the ritual. It was already made harder by the fact that the persons she recruited began to doubt her and the fact that her actions and remarks already made the rock more like a supernatural object than the lucky charm Big Brother wanted it to appear. The stress of Slater's task later forces him to quit, resulting in Big Brother giving him an automatic nomination.
- Day 13: At the Industrial House, the housemates donned school uniforms for a Japanese-language course with Seichang and Erica as instructors. They also ate sushi off a sumo wrestler lying in the living room. At the Slums, Joya was finally informed of Slater's secret task and the consequence of him quitting it. She was then given her own secret task of inviting Slater to a dinner date, which she successfully accomplished. The date would have been the final part of Slater's task to test its success.
- Day 14: Casey successfully completed her secret task despite Wendy earlier asking her housemates about reportedly seeing some housemates doing the ritual. The Slum housemates were left overjoyed that their budget relied on the success of her weekly task. At the Industrial House, Seichang confessed to Big Brother that he likes Jaz, which prompted Big Brother to assign him with giving her three compliments. The Industrial House denizens' origami task took a different turn—they had a short time to redo the origami designs they did earlier from memory and use large sheets of paper for them, with next week's budget at stake.

== Week 3 ==
- Day 15: Big Brother meted punishments on several housemates at the Industrial House. Seichang was forced to communicate using a sock puppet because of misuse of the lapel microphone. For failure to respond to the wake-up call for a third time, Pamu strapped herself onto a gurney and was told not to move until told. Lordwin and Unad were made to wear two jackets conjoined back-to-back due to their use of hand signals. The housemates in both houses also watched the pilot episode of the upcoming show Angelito: Batang Ama. The stars of the show, Charee Pineda and JM De Guzman visited the Houses, with Charee having a video chat with the boys of the Industrial House from inside the confession room and Eting and Wendy meeting JM blindfolded by saying the name "Angelito" correctly at the Slums. Kim and Mark also came closer to being unmasked as a couple. At night, the Slums housemates were told that their pole dancing routines were a success, enabling them to have an unlimited supply of clean water. A new batch of housemates, dubbed the 3Gs (3 Gorgeous Girls) and the Power Strangers, were inserted into the Resort and the Industrial House respectively. Because of Slater's failure in the secret task, he was assigned to convince his fellow male housemates to accept the 3Gs as official housemates, even if it would be at the expense of one of the female housemates. If even one of them would refuse, he would have to either choose which female housemate has to leave or face a forced eviction. Inside the confession room, the 3Gs analyzed each of the Slums male housemates as they took a bath, then Slater also got to see the 3Gs for the first time.
- Day 16: Upon drawing wooden swords, the Power Strangers, dressed in masks and colored jumpsuits (in the manner of Super Sentai teams), entered the Industrial House and were tasked to appear as likable to the housemates in order to be official housemates themselves by the end of the week. At the confession room, the Strangers unmasked themselves to Big Brother as a new face: RJ, Reg, and Kulas. Meanwhile, at the Slums, the housemates had a special task under the guise of a boxing workout: to jump rope 30 times, hit a speed bag 30 times, and hit a punching bag three times, with the fastest housemates being given a chance to watch the fight between Manny Pacquiao and Juan Manuel Márquez. The slowest would carry an antenna to maintain signal quality for the entire fight. The Industrial House residents also watched the fight as well as a reward for the female housemates winning a task to punch an array of paper bags; they each played round girl also to maintain signal quality. One by one, Slater brought over the male housemates to the confession room for a two-hour "outing" at the Resort with the 3Gs (Cindy, Rhea and Deniesse), who were assigned to learn intimate secrets from each male housemate. They had to get to the confession room without the female housemates looking. However, the party was loud enough to reach the girls in the Slums, who realized right away where everybody else went. Biggel, who saw his first-ever swimming pool, threw up in the slums after the outing and because of his drunken stupor, told Tin his feelings for her.
- Day 17: Having cried foul over the boys' outing, the Slums' female housemates were later given a chance to frolic in the Resort with only Carlo to accompany them because of his gentlemanly conduct towards them. The 3Gs, dressed as maids, also came to the Slums to deliver kiss marks on all of the male housemates and also serve them beef steak for dinner. At the Industrial House, Big Brother assigned Erica to find out whom among the housemates were actually related to each other in some way before entering the House, with immunity from nomination at stake. She was shown pictures of her fellow housemates to determine the potential suspects. The housemates were assigned to build a tower of playing cards as their weekly task.
- Day 18: The Industrial housemates experienced difficulties with building the card tower, prompting Big Brother to play a game where the housemates would pass around a card with their lips to get additional card decks. Big Brother chose Paco to help Erica in the task. The two recalled the initial entry of the new housemates on Day 8 and determined that Kim and Mark may be who they were looking for. The housemates got wind of what is going on, forcing Kim and Mark to stay apart for the moment, but it ran into a snag when Kim uttered remarks about a special bracelet her boyfriend gave her (Mark removed it earlier) and the boyfriend's choice of cologne, which Paco discovered among Mark's personal effects. After presenting their findings at the confession room, Big Brother assigned the two to become prosecution lawyers in a trial designed to finally uncover the truth about Mark and Kim, with the other housemates as the jurors. At the Slums, the housemates were caught by surprise upon seeing a man in scuba suit bring in a remote-controlled fish-shaped balloon, prompting Big Brother to announce their weekly task. However, it didn't take an hour for the fish, which the housemates called "Fifi," to suddenly fly away from the House. The housemates were forced to make a public-service announcement for Fifi's return, offering part of their food as reward. Unknown to them, the public were also invited to find Fifi and return it to the show staff, with the chance to meet one of the Slums housemates as a reward. Because Fifi was lost on their watch, Carlo and Wendy were punished by dressing as mermaids and put in an inflatable pool for several hours, which left Carlo's legs numb overnight because of the tight tail constricting the blood flow. The male housemates also played a speed 9-ball tournament, but using various long objects in lieu of cue sticks, such as a mannequin leg and a police baton. The three fastest among them—Biggel, Kigoy, and Jerico—won a chance to be massaged at the Resort by the 3Gs, who were also tasked to have their charges talk about their love stories and also get a souvenir from each of them.
- Day 19: In the Industrial House, Seichang made a sacrifice by acting like a baby to help the housemates acquire a platform for the tower, with Jaz becoming his nursemaid. Kim was distraught seeing Mark flirt with Lyn just when the trial was close at hand. Erica and Paco finally presented their case, as well as their evidence, to prove Kim and Mark's relationship, forcing the couple to insist on the contrary. The other housemates, acting as jury, sided with Erica and Paco with Big Brother confirming their suspicions. With their relationship finally known to the others, Mark and Kim were given the automatic nomination. In turn, Paco and Erica were granted immunity from nomination for the success of their task, but Erica later gave up immunity so she could talk with her daughter through webcam ahead of the latter's birthday. The 3Gs appeared at the Slums, this time in front of both male and female housemates. The 3Gs' presence made the female housemates uncomfortable, while the male housemates planned a special birthday program for Rhea. Production staff also came and set up a queen-size bed for the 3Gs, who will sleep in the Slums. When asked by Big Brother about the secret task assigned to him, Slater said he is still committed but expressed fears of eviction. After the birthday program, Big Brother consulted the male housemates, who all agreed to accept the 3Gs as official housemates, based on their time with them for the past few days. However, he announced that three of the current female housemates will have to leave in exchange for the 3Gs. The male housemates immediately analyzed the potential "weakest links."
- Day 20: After cooking breakfast at the Industrial House and amusing the housemates, the Power Strangers were put on the voting gauntlet with the housemates hanging ears of corn on their necks. Kulas, the Blue Stranger, received seven ears against Reg with six and RJ with one. He was told to finally unmask himself in front of the housemates, ending his stint in the House. The remaining Power Strangers played a special card consequence game. Lordwin and Unad were secretly tasked to see the unmasked face of one of the remaining Power Strangers using a camera picture as proof. RJ, the Green Stranger, agreed to take his mask off for the shot, but Lordwin and Unad's success was nulled by the fact that they explicitly told RJ of the task when told not to by Big Brother. Pamu later saw RJ going to bed without the mask. At the Slums, Biggel was given a special task to shoot ping-pong balls into plastic cups patterned after the number 16, which will give Tin a chance to have unlimited text messaging with her father Alvin for a set number of minutes. Biggel and Divine scored 12. The housemates also went to the Resort again while Biggel was left behind at the confession room. As it turned out, he met Tin's basketball-star father at the Slums for a one-on-one session in honor of the latter's 45th birthday, during which they talked about Biggel's feelings for Tin. The housemates returned and Tin knew her father visited by the size of his shoe-prints on the ground.
- Day 21: In the Industrial House, since Pamu saw the Green Stranger unmasked after his picture was taken, Big Brother ordered RJ reveal himself to the housemates before being evicted in tears. Since Reg, the Red Stranger, was also in tears at possibly not making it in as well, the housemates made him undergo initiation rites to be finally confirmed as an official housemate. The housemates also tried one last push to complete their card tower, but it fell just after the countdown clock lapsed. In the Slums, the male housemates confirmed to Big Brother and the female housemates their consensus—under the guise of a vote—that Diane, Wendy, and Joya will have to leave the Slums in exchange for the 3Gs coming in—which did not sit well with everybody. The 3Gs, who watched the event from the confession room, were left distraught by what happened, but were told that only one of them would be an official housemate (with the Slums female housemates deciding on their fate). Diane, Wendy, and Joya were transferred to the Luxury House.

== Week 4 ==
- Day 22: Jaz and Seichang were ordered by Big Brother to pack up and leave the Industrial House immediately. Despite Seichang's misgivings about actually leaving the House altogether, the two slipped away through a secret tunnel leading to the Luxury House. The two met Diane, Wendy, and Joya, then Big Brother asked the five of them to dress well for a special feast. The female official housemates from the Slums ruled that Deniesse has to be an official housemate (two out of four votes). In the afternoon, the remaining housemates in the Slums were forcibly herded to a dump truck with all their belongings as the place was demolished. The group were later put at the Luxury House and were reunited with the other five housemates in a cocktail party. Since some of the housemates lost clothes during the transfer, Carlo lent some of his own clothes for the party. Divine and Kigoy got into a short disagreement over the food upon arriving in the house, which prompted Tol to talk to Kigoy about his manners and for Divine to raise her concerns about him with Slater during the party. At the Industrial House, Pamu got ideas about Jaz and Seichang's sudden departure. They also entered the Resort for the very first time. Lordwin and Unad were forced to wear special shorts with very prominent fake butt pieces because the other housemates complained about their frequent farting. They also apologized for their behaviour. The housemates were also visited by Ryan (a reserved housemate), a dance instructor brought over in a balikbayan box from the US for their weekly task (see below).
- Day 23: The Luxury House residents saw special chairs arranged at the dining table with pictures of each housemate. They also learned that a family successfully recovered Fifi, with a picture as proof. Biggel and Tin received two members of the family at the confession room, where they rewarded the family with special shirts from the show signed by all the Luxury House residents, a basket containing the food offered as reward, and their own Fifi toy. The fallout from the nomination gets on Kigoy's nerves to the point that he breaks a plate by accident. Tol and Big Brother console him over the fact that he has never been in such opulent settings. Meanwhile, at the Industrial House, the nominations also left the housemates uneasy, especially automatic nominees Mark and Kim, and Lordwin, who expressed fears about going back to his old life if he does get evicted.
- Day 24: At the Industrial House, Big Brother announced the launch of "Gender Wars," a series of challenges pitting the male housemates against the female housemates, with group immunity at stake. The first challenge was a bathing game where each housemate has to use one large soap bar and be lathered in a large plastic tub. Since the male housemates were too many, Ryan sat out the challenge and became the referee. The boys won the challenge because they used much of their soap. Pamu and Reg were individually assigned to recruit their housemates in pulling off as many practical jokes on the other group. Pamu's plan to use vinegar as massage oil for her first practical joke eventually fell apart as the male housemates get wind of the smell, forcing Paco to interrogate her why she mixed vinegar with the massage oil and for the guys to plan their counterstrikes. Because Pamu was stressed out at the task with none of her teammates joining in, Big Brother allowed her and Reg to explain everything to the housemates. Big Brother confirmed that the boys won the game, having pulled off two pranks (out of six they planned) against Pamu's first prank. At the Luxury House, Seichang was sent to the confession room to see Sadako, who will be his date for the night. He and Jaz also spent 45 minutes at the Resort as a reward for being out of anyone's sight for the same period during their transfer from the Industrial House and before Joya chanced upon Jaz at the Luxury House. Because he has been putting his arm around Tin's shoulder too often, Big Brother ordered Biggel to keep his distance and tuck two small basketballs under his arms. The housemates also talked to him about being too close to Tin and making her uncomfortable. Divine made some homemade ice cream and Big Brother provided the ingredients to have Biggel make it himself. Luz was assigned a new secret task: a reserved housemate named Seth will enter the house and she must pose as his wife. Since they also saw Seth during the show's US auditions, Tol, Deniesse, and Carlo were ordered not to talk about him at all (due to show confidentiality rules on the audition process). Wendy also discussed her adherence to Islam and her thoughts about Islamophobia with Big Brother, who gave her a copy of the Quran, a hijab, a prayer book and mat, and a compass to help her orient with Mecca during her prayers.
- Day 25: The Industrial House housemates created an instrumental version of Pinoy Ako using readily available objects in the house, with Paco acting as their maestro. Lyn became the female housemates' leader for the third Gender Wars battle, a boating race wherein a certain housemate will be the "boat" by being covered in bubble wrap and each of the other housemates will have to ride the "boat" to the other side. Lyn confessed to Big Brother her reservations over the task—she had never been in a leadership position all her life. The girls eventually won the race, but lost in a solo swimming run between Mark and Lyn—something which irks Steph, who implied that Lyn was making the team lose because she chose a stronger opponent. The next challenge was a debate as to whether men or women are the stronger sex, with Paco as the arbiter. However, Kevin's case on women being plastik (a play on plastic; Tagalog slang for duplicitous), as in plastic surgery and breast augmentation, later made Erica cry, having gone under the knife herself and still suffering the effects years later. Big Brother said some visitors will evaluate the debate before deciding on a winner. The Luxury House residents resumed their task of taking care of Fifi, but those who are at the controls must wear goggles and flippers. Seth, a tall American man who is also a reserved housemate, entered the house as well.
- Day 26: The Industrial Housemates dressed up in warrior outfits for a Gender Wars theme cheer-dance competition. Since they were on limited supplies for failing the previous weekly task, Big Brother surprised them with a feast of roasted chicken as reward for a shouting task. Because he felt bad at what he said on the debate, Big Brother challenged Kevin to make a Tagalog poem and carry any one of the female housemates whenever the wedding march is played. Unknown to Erica, it was a task to prepare her for a romantic dinner at the confession room with her boyfriend, who proposed to her on the spot. At the Luxury House, Seth asked Luz to join him in a voluntary exit and Luz tried to convince her housemates not to let her go. Both housemates finally came clean about their task and Seth was confirmed as an official housemate. Tol benefited from the secret task by having a 100-second audio conversation with his children. Biggel succeeded in his task to make some homemade ice cream for Big Brother and was allowed to take off the balls under his arms. He was ordered to make an additional batch for the housemates to finally put his arm around Tin again. Big Brother introduced "Sharky," a remote-controlled shark balloon, with a man in scuba suit at the controls as Carlo and Kigoy tried to get Fifi away from the intruder. The four Luxury House nominees for the week were assigned to mimic various objects around the house, with Kigoy as a dining room chair, Tol as a mop, Diane as a dog statue, and Slater as a smiley-face throw pillow. Big Brother held a special reenactment play with the housemates acting out his narrations, which resulted in the four nominees finally taking off their costumes.
- Day 27: Divine created a matching series of tattoos on the backs of Kigoy and Casey—people she is not even close with at all—and Carlo. At the Industrial House, Lordwin and Unad were assigned to keep a special women's medallion as part of another Gender Wars challenge, but the girls eventually stole it, with the score now at 3-2 still in the boys' favor; their reward was to pick one of the male housemates and absorb him into their team. Knowing that Paco's skills would be an advantage, the girls chose him. He was made to dress like a girl as part of the "gender transition". With the failure of previous tasks assigned to him and punishments, Lordwin expressed resignation as to his stay in the House. The final Gender Wars challenge went underway, wherein both teams will have to assemble picture puzzles of housemates who uttered certain quotes. The girls won the game, 4-2, with the series now tied at 3-3. They also continued with practicing the dance task but Naprey's pressure to sync with the dancers prompts Ryan to help him.
- Day 28: At the Luxury House, the housemates held one last feast for the nominees, as a reward for their finishing of the narration task. Diane also requested fruit salad as part of the menu. At the Industrial House, the housemates finally pushed through with their weekly task, with some of them providing the background music. Big Brother also confirmed the final result of the Gender Wars debate, which was voted through a post on the show's official Facebook page. The girls won the debate on a 2,436-886 vote, thereby declaring them winners of the challenge and earning group immunity. Lyn chose Kevin and Lordwin to join them in a victory party at the Resort while those left behind were ordered to clean the entire Industrial House.

== Week 5 ==
- Day 29: Due to the success of his week-long weight loss task, Tol was allowed to spend 100 seconds with his daughters in a taxi cab. He also gave them seven chocolate bars and seven lollipops to represent the seven pounds he shed during the said task. The housemates at both Houses were left devastated by the evictions of Diane and Lordwin, who met in the eviction hall.
- Day 30: Both Houses' residents were tasked to form a team name and logo - giving rise to Team High-Voltage (Luxury House) and Team Wayuk (Industrial House). Before the broadcast, Tin talked to Roy, Carlo, Jaz and Wendy about Biggel's repeated lurking around her, which she admitted was getting on her nerves too much. They all recommended that Tin spend more time with the girls and give Biggel a wide berth. Later that night, Big Brother revealed to both Houses the existence of the other house, as well as the House Competitions. He also added that due to unequal numbers, two High-Voltage members would have to move to the Industrial House to be with Team Wayuk at an appointed time. Ryan was declared a housemate.
- Day 31: At the Luxury House, Big Brother announced that the Industrial House residents will choose among them who will be transferred. Kigoy, Tol, Deniesse, Carlo, Jaz, Divine, Luz and Seichang went to the Industrial House confession room for separate five-minute interviews with Unad, Mark, Steph, Jessica, and Lyn. The gravity of the impending transfer is too much on everybody, with Biggel crying about what it could mean to him with his closest friend—Carlo—crossing the fence. In the end, the Industrial housemates chose Seichang (due to his familiarity and closeness with them) and Luz, who was given a warm welcome. At the Luxury House, the housemates were assigned their weekly task. The first distraction came in the form of a DJ from a local radio station providing color commentary about the housemates over dinner, but Biggel could barely keep his cool under the DJ's heckling, especially when Tin is brought up. A chicken the housemates once took care of at the Slums also appeared. Jaz made a voluntary exit during the nomination broadcast. Deniesse, Seichang, Carlo, and Divine sported immunity necklaces for winning a Head of Household competition where they had maneuver Fifi through an obstacle course. Carlo and Divine later became the arbiter in a serious conversation between Biggel and Tin to finally make him understand that they are only just friends.
- Day 32: Luz talked with Big Brother about feeling uneasy at the sudden change in atmosphere inside the Industrial House while Seichang admits he missed Pamu. The housemates on both houses were given their weekly task. Seichang, Pamu, Unad, and Lyn went to the confession room for another session with Big Brother, with their first distraction close by—a blind barber tending to them separately. Two male housemates sporting tinikling bamboo poles went inside the house to distract the housemates. Luz and Jessica briefed their housemates about the first main inter-House battle, a three-minute jumping rope exhibition. They chose Lyn, Kevin, Ryan, Mark, and Seichang as the other members of the crew. Pamu went for a session at the confession room, where actor and Celebrity Edition veteran Zanjoe Marudo (in mask) sat at the barber's chair. The team failed in ignoring Zanjoe because he was active inside the house, even taking one end of the jump rope from Naprey. Voting for the Industrial House nominees was stopped because of a housemate being meted a forced eviction. The forced evictee was later revealed to be Reg, who talked with Mark and Luz about events before coming in as a Power Stranger and was also caught without his lapel mic on several times. At the Luxury House, Wendy and Eting were sent to the confession room on separate occasions, where they sat on a chair that had soft-boiled eggs and ice cubes. Carlo, Deniesse, and Divine were summoned as well, but Carlo and Divine noticed that the chair was no longer there even if they were ordered to sit, therefore failing part of their weekly task. Big Brother announced their first inter-House minor battle, a language-proficiency competition where those who are fluent in English must speak in Tagalog and Tagalog-speakers should talk in English over a round of tongue twisters, declamation, and guessing a word to use in a sentence. A week's stay at the Resort will be at stake. For High-Voltage, Deniesse coached English-speakers Divine and Carlo, who were paired off against Kevin and Seichang with Mark as coach. Seth will coach Eting and Biggel in speaking English against Lyn and Pamu with Naprey as mentor. Tension erupted again between Divine and Kigoy because his loud reading of a book disrupted their practice. Wayuk won the tongue-twister battle and High-Voltage won the declamation round, triggering a sudden-death fight in the charades game, which Wayuk won.
- Day 33: A folder containing information on all Team High-Voltage members was left at a table in the Industrial House, but Paco and Kim took notice of it for a short moment. Jessica's dog, Lily, was also put on the other side of a grating where Pamu, Seichang, Mark and Lordwin were locked up weeks before for sleeping past the wake-up call. Ryan and Luz were sent to the confession room, where someone cleaned his feet. Erica's concerns about the side-effects of her breast implants prompted Big Brother to send over a general surgeon to check on them. The doctor attested that the implants do not hamper Erica's overall conditions. A long line of catering trays full of food was left at the Luxury House dining room for breakfast and Roy later confessed that seeing the trays was torture on all of them. Wendy's boyfriend also came over to clean the house and she talked to the housemates about him without actually directing it at him. The Luxury housemates went to the Resort for an hour, with a tourist in scuba suit waiting for them at the pool. Divine got into a short disagreement with Seth over using two jump ropes at the same time for the competition, which he believed they could handle. Paco later entered the Luxury House as a clown but still got the cold shoulder even as a former housemate; Deniesse took it over the edge by spraying air freshener right in Paco's face. Some of Tin's dogs were sent inside the house as another distraction, with her Labrador, Prada, inside the confession room. The canines' presence also irked Wendy because they defecated. With the announcement of the first major battle, Carlo and Divine screened for six people who could work together in creating the routine, eventually choosing Seth, Tin, Jerico, Eting, Roy, and Slater. Kigoy got angry about Divine excluding him.
- Day 34: A marching band entered the Industrial House to distract the residents. The housemates were sent to the confession room to pick items from a jar that had different dangerous animals inside, such as rats and cockroaches. However, Lyn got cold feet at attempting to pick up a nipper from a small fishbowl because of her verminophobia, prompting Luz to come in and calm her down. The housemates continued to practice for the jump rope battle even while at the Resort. Paco also had ideas about including Naprey as part of the routine, replacing original selectee Pamu. Kigoy also visited the Industrial House in a Tokay gecko costume to harass the housemates, especially former Slums housemates Luz and Pamu. He went back to the Luxury House to report on his findings, including Naprey's actual condition. Kigoy's visit prompted Paco to tell his fellow housemates what happened to him over there, something that would convince everybody to step up their game. The housemates also hung out at the resort, where Erica was distracted at the sight of her eraser collection. A downpour resulted in the team failing part of the task because Erica did not want to see her erasers destroyed. They later ignored a roast pig laid at the table. At the Luxury House, the voice of Divine's girlfriend became her wake-up call. High-Voltage went to the activity area to practice, with a man in black carrying a python to distract them. The same man later came to the Luxury House itself, where those left behind were tasked to talk about their greatest fears. Wendy and Deniesse visibly squirmed and moved around the table at the sight of the snake. They also went to the storage room to see a pack of cigarettes.
- Day 35: The Luxury House residents ignored a news broadcast about the Industrial House forced evictee. They also celebrated Carlo's birthday through a 26-minute party (since he just turned 26). Big Brother issued dares to prolong the festivities by three minutes for each successful dare—one of which was for Divine to wear a dress and heel shoes. At the Industrial House, Big Brother's revelation about Reg's forced eviction to Kim, Paco, Steph, and Luz prompted all the housemates to finally hold an open forum about their attitudes, which gave Reg a chance to explain himself. The first major inter-House battle took place after several hours of practice. Big Brother invited Season 2 alumnus Mickey Perz, UP Varsity Pep Squad co-captain Laurence Bautista and Philippine Gymnastics and Athletics Academy president Butch Ty to serve as the judges.

== Week 6 ==
- Day 36: Former Celebrity Edition housemate John Prats got permission from Big Brother to have Lyn as one of the judges in Happy Yipee Yehey's Miss Kasambahay talent competition for house-helps; she also revealed having auditioned for the contest as well. At the Luxury House, Casey got emotional about what could be her last day on the house and her attachment with Roy. The Industrial House held their Head of Household competition, wherein they will wear blacked-out goggles and had to use their chin or elbows to correctly identify certain objects put before them—all in three minutes. Steph won the challenge. During the eviction broadcast, both Houses watched the judges' commentary on the battle. Bautista voted in favor of Wayuk while Perz and Ty judged High-Voltage as the winner based on the variety of their moves and the energy they exerted. A masked woman came to deposit a red bag symbolizing the prize money in a glass container. Mark, Luz, and Reg went to the confession room where they were made to watch footage of Reg's various violations and for Reg to be finally informed of his forced eviction. Big Brother said the other two will be meted their punishments in due time because of their complicity in asking Reg about what he knew on Carlo's selection of those who eventually transferred to the Industrial House on Day 8. Paco also took offense at Deniesse's gloating about the victory, citing the spraying incident. He later encouraged his housemates to move on from the loss and take the fight to High-Voltage, who also talked about him cheating by coaching Seichang during the first mini-battle's declamation round.
- Day 37: In the early morning hours, Mark and Luz were meted their punishments, which consisted of them carrying a separate globe on their shoulders (in the manner of Atlas), with automatic nomination to be issued on whoever drops it first. Big Brother made them go to sleep after carrying the globes for over four hours, but later announced that Mark would be the automatic nominee because he momentarily dozed off and let his globe off his shoulder for a split second. The housemates held an impromptu men's pageant to ease the tension before the nomination. Seichang, Jessica, and Paco also shared their concerns with Big Brother about Paco's reaction to the spraying incident and his overall attitude, which was aired over the Luxury House speakers. Big Brother aired Divine, Wendy, and Deniesse's explanations over the Industrial House speakers—which did not sit well with Paco, knowing that Deniesse never met him at all and only based her opinion of him from her fellow housemates. Kigoy was taught some table manners over breakfast and later won the Luxury House's second Head of Household game, which had the same mechanics as that of the Industrial House. Both houses engaged in a debate as to which is the better team, but it only caused more skeletons to come out of the closet (such as references to the spraying incident, the Industrial housemates' punishments, the Luxury housemates being allegedly smarter, and the Luxury's jumprope victory).
- Day 38: The Industrial housemates woke up to the sound of the classic Tagalog children's song Bahay Kubo. Ryan's cluelessness about the song prompts Big Brother to assign the weekly task to Unad, Steph, and Kim (see below). For lunch, the so-called "Overseas Filipino Kids" (OFK)—Seichang, Kevin, and Ryan—were taught how to cook the traditional Filipino dishes adobo, pork sinigang, paksiw na isda (fish in vinegar sauce) and pancit bihon. Former housemate and DJ-by-trade Casey was utilized as the voice of the new Big Brother Radio and she played a soundbite of Divine's comments about the Industrial House being a better place without Luz, who was left visibly affected enough to "phone in" her thoughts on the matter. Casey later posted another blind item directed at Mark and Kim. At the Luxury House, Joya and Roy talked about Kigoy with Big Brother, who assigns their weekly task. The housemates plan to stage a so-called "Mr PBB" pageant as part of the task while Joya tries to talk to him that it is for his own good. Seth's issues about being discriminated and his own rift with Divine since he came to the house became a topic of discussion. Wendy and Deniesse's profanity-laden chats were later replayed over the speakers. Tol acted as a father figure to discipline the two, both of whom reportedly resemble his own daughters. He also led a discussion in the living room on proper family values, with the housemates talking about life lessons passed down by their parents. Seth waited outside the confession room all night long to talk about what they discussed.
- Day 39: DJ Casey broadcast again to the Industrial House for another live show with the housemates, quizzing them about their crushes. Paco shared his story about his old girlfriend while Casey teased Seichang and Pamu. Big Brother asked Unad, Steph, and Kim to step up in their weekly task by holding Tagalog-language sessions for their charges. To test Kim's desire to be independent, Big Brother gave her and Mark only one hour to be together for the entire week but she must not tell him about the task. A digital counter in the living room will wind down every time they are in close proximity with each other. Pamu was rewarded with a chance to call her mother for a few minutes because she successfully taught Ryan, Seichang, Kevin, and Jessica how to eat the palm of nganga (betel nuts). The OFKs were taught how to play the traditional Filipino street games trumpo (spinning tops), sipa (a derivative of sepak takraw), and luksong tinik. Big Brother also held a special tournament to test their knowledge, with their reward being a party at the Resort where they ate traditional Filipino street food such as fishballs, balut, and kwek-kwek (eggs dipped in batter). The housemates practiced running scooters to prepare for the second inter-House skirmish. The OFKs were tasked to write a meaningful poem about their loved ones, but everybody cried at Kevin's Tagalog poem about his mother. At the Luxury House, Seth finally talked to Big Brother and Tol about the life lesson discussions, even lamenting that he has never had a sense of belonging and is irked at the housemates' sad stories. Wendy and Deniesse accomplished their task of being Tol's "daughters." The housemates were caught by surprise when a news report came in about one of their own having the wrong surname, which they pinned on either Biggel or Kigoy. Although he was asleep at the time the report aired, Kigoy suspected that it was about him.
- Day 40: At the Industrial House, still reeling from Kevin's poem, Luz and Lyn had a fierce argument because Lyn somehow butted in Luz and Erica's own discussion about the poem bringing back memories of Luz' own mother, with Pamu and Paco placating the situation. Both of them eventually reconciled. Mark and Kim were assigned to train the OFKs on how to do the traditional Filipino courtship custom of men serenading women (with Steph, Pamu, and Jessica as the objects of affection and Paco as their father). They were also assigned to organize the "Ginoong (Tagalog for Mister) OFK" competition. The second minor inter-House battle was a scooter challenge wherein each housemate had to slip between two rows of soft columns without touching anything. High-Voltage won on a 6-4 score, earning for themselves the exclusive use of the Resort, a luxury item, and a special item that could give them an advantage in the next major battle. The Kigoy reform project continued, with Carlo asking him about etiquette around the female housemates and how he would behave upon seeing his crush, actress Maja Salvador.
- Day 41: DJ Casey woke up the Industrial housemates and talked to the OFKs about their Tagalog pick-up lines. Pamu and Kevin fooled around about Filipino women's behaviour while Steph and Unad had serious discussions about the Philippines with Seichang and Ryan. The OFKs were also taught how to do the maglalatik dance and create a routine. Lyn said in her phone patch that she'd like to give her mother a gift for Christmas. While talking about her mother at the confession room, Big Brother played a message of Lyn's sister telling her that their mother died the night before; the housemates comforted Lyn after the message was played all over the house. At the Luxury House, the housemates chose a luxury item from a list of items in a colored wheel. They did not like threading; Big Brother gave them a second chance to spin the wheel and won a maniped, but only half the group will take advantage of it. Kigoy went to the Industrial House confession room for an elegant date with Pamu, and his tutors watched the date take place. Big Brother brought Kigoy to a secret room with a bank of TVs which aired a This Is Your Life-style presentation, complete with footage from a recent interview by the production staff with his mother, whom he had not seen in years and also shared some revelations about his past. Kigoy confirmed to Carlo that the earlier news report was about him indeed. Voting for both houses was stopped because of a housemate preparing a voluntary exit and another being force-evicted. The housemates were briefed on their next major inter-House contest: posing for ten hours in a tableau about the Nativity of Jesus, complete with the animals and the three Kings. The object was to keep still for the entire duration and move as less as possible, with shift changes every hour. Wayuk resolved to work harder and win the battle for Lyn, while Big Brother agreed with Luz' proposal to donate the prize money to Lyn to help cover the funeral expenses.
- Day 42: Both teams finally held their second major battle. Housemates who were not on the tableau were put on standby to help keep their teammates in top shape. The stress of the task led to several housemates fainting on both sides. Despite the physical strain, Wayuk won the battle with moving only 34 times as opposed to 39 for High-Voltage. After the victory, Wayuk voted to give the whole prize to Lyn, who found out for the first time why her team really wanted to win. Paco had reservations because of the possibility her relatives could take too much of the money. Paco, Kim, and Luz were invited to judge the Luxury House's "Mr. PBB Unlimited" pageant, which Kigoy won. The housemates were also assigned their weekly task. The Luxury House male housemates suited up as firefighters in a reward challenge in which they had to find three keys to unlock a metal chest-one of which was with Wendy. The Industrial housemates' version of the challenge involved them splitting into pairs and raced holding a full glass of water behind their backs. Their prize were special sandwiches from KFC.

== Week 7 ==
- Day 43: Lyn left in the early morning hours to return to Surigao for her mother's funeral. Mark, due to his consistent violation of the rules, was revealed as the forced evictee during the primetime broadcast, where everyone, including Team High-Voltage, observed a moment of silence for Lyn's mother. Kim cried with Mark leaving. Big Brother stressed again the adherence to the House Rules, sending a red-suited police officer and a cloaked man to the Industrial and Luxury Houses, respectively, to keep watch over them with a list of violations each housemate already committed since entering the House.
- Day 44: Mark's forced eviction became a hot topic at the Luxury House, which prompted the housemates to check the rule book again for clarifications. At the Industrial House, his departure prompted Kim to proceed with hosting the Ginoong OFK pageant alone. Roy, Tin and Biggel judged the "contestants" from their confession room. Both houses held their next Head of Household challenge, wherein they had to eat certain food items while wearing a football helmet. Unad and Biggel won. The housemates were assigned their weekly task.
- Day 45: The Industrial housemates started practicing their songs for the weekly task with Paco taking charge. Because of their closeness, Big Brother assigned Unad to have a drinking session with Seichang at another outdoor area resembling what used to be the Slums, with a male mannequin close by. The mannequin represented Pamu's boyfriend (who spoke to him over the speakers) and Unad used his own relationship story to convince Seichang that he cannot have a real relationship with Pamu when the boyfriend is already in the equation. The discussion was apparently too much for Seichang to bear; he returned to the Industrial house crying and heavily drunk, leading the housemates to put him to sleep first. His emotional state prompted Big Brother to talk to Pamu about what happened. Big Brother rewarded the housemates with PHP50,000 for their show of generosity to Lyn. At the Luxury House, Big Brother's warning about tougher sanctions had its first example: Joya, Wendy, Divine, Seth, Roy, Kigoy, and Slater were made to wear straitjackets (for using hand signals) and will constantly speak only one syllable (for failure to use lapel mics). In syllabic language, he also ordered Joya, Wendy, and Divine to make him a cup of coffee, Seth and Slater to do Wendy's hair, and Roy and Kigoy to clean the girls' room—and do it in ten minutes. Since they all failed, the male violators were allowed to speak normally again after the girls led a Christmas carol using the syllable assigned to them (Da) while jumping. Seth and Kigoy had an argument because of communication problems from practicing Amazing Grace, which led Big Brother to order Joya, Wendy, and Divine to try reconciling the two.
- Day 46: At the Industrial House, Seichang woke up having apparently recovered from his hangover and was cautioned by Big Brother about his drinking. He also came to accept the reality about him and Pamu. As a test of his respect for her, he was secretly tasked to deliberately ignore her for the whole day. Pamu was rankled by his repeated avoidance and Big Brother gave her 75 minutes to confront him about it. When she did fail, Kim was assigned to slap them with handcuffs of differing lengths, eventually cuffing both their arms to each other so they could finally talk. At the Luxury House, Seth and Kigoy eventually made up and went back to practicing. At the Luxury House, Seth played Santa Claus with each of the housemates sitting on his lap to talk about their Christmas wishes. The next inter-House minor skirmish went underway, with caricatures of High-Voltage and Wayuk (that Divine and Erica made, respectively) sent to each other's house. The housemates were tasked to identify who best suits Big Brother's questions about traits and why. Wayuk won on a 6-2 score, indicating their strong knowledge of the other squad. Both houses were assigned the second part of the week's main inter-House battle.
- Day 47: The Industrial housemates woke up to find a special Christmas tree in the living room. Unknown to them, Paco spent all night building it. At the confession room, Pamu and Seichang were asked to write one word using strawberries to express feelings for each other. Their reward was strawberry yogurt shakes from KFC for the housemates. Now starting over as friends, Pamu and Seichang went to the Resort for a friendly date that had an ice cream cart and swings. Reflecting on her childhood experiences, Luz was given two hours to cook beef tripe congee for the housemates and the estimated 500 people who will troop outside of the Big Brother House for the caroling challenge, which went underway for both Houses. Erica sat out the task because of her religious beliefs, but helped out by offering calamansi juice to re-energize the team. At the Luxury House, because he was identified in the mini-contest as one of the laziest Housemates, Jerico stepped up by cooking breakfast for everybody. The housemates pushed ahead with their caroling performance, but further disagreements between Kigoy and Biggel (that have built up since the day before) threaten to derail everything, with Kigoy even proposing a voluntary exit. Big Brother cautioned him to keep it cool. Meanwhile, former Housemates Diane, Jaz, and Reg, plus Tin's parents, Wendy's mother, and Carlo's relatives came to support the teams. Tin had an idea that a number of requests of Away in a Manger, plus one for their original song, came from her parents. Seth went all vocal about thoughts on his housemates' factionalism and behavior to Tol, whom Deniesse and Slater approached to try straightening things out. Carlo and Deniesse were sent to the confession room to hear his rants.
- Day 48: The Industrial housemates saw more Christmas fixtures in their midst. Their reward for winning the minor inter-House challenge was a return to the Resort, where they had to get chocolates from two plastic tubs floating in the pool. Luz admitted that Big Brother's voice turned her on, causing the housemates to rib her about it. Paco and Kim stepped up in planning the music video of their original Christmas song, which was recorded inside the confession room before the music video was shot with Kim and Kevin as the lead talents. During the second caroling night, former Housemates Mark and Lordwin, Luz' daughter, Pamu's boyfriend, and Slater's family, plus three former Biggest Loser contestants, appeared to make their requests. The Luxury housemates also recorded their original song and produced the music video. Seth had a showdown with Deniesse, Carlo, and Slater at the confession room, where Tol served as the arbiter.
- Day 49: Because of her art skills, Erica was tasked to make a painting depicting Wayuk's relationship as her teammates pushed ahead with the penultimate night of the caroling. As daylight came, the Industrial housemates woke up to find pictures of their house in tatters, prompting everybody to clean up the place. However, two masked housekeepers suddenly came over to take away all of the other things still strewn about. They also discovered the refrigerator missing (secretly stashed at the Activity Area), saw plates full of rotten leftovers as reminders of their wastage, and Big Brother gave a lengthy sermon. He said they can get the refrigerator back if they can take off six locks connected to chains lashed around it. The matching keys, plus 34 other false keys, were hidden in a pool full of garbage. They unlocked the refrigerator and returned to the house to find a list of violations for the month at the dining table, with failing to heed bedtime calls, taking baths outside the shower call, and speaking with no lapel mics the most common items. On a signal, they were tasked to roll two giant dice to determine the nature of their punishments and who should receive it. Kim, Ryan, and Naprey were made to wear fake mouthpieces controlled by a ventriloquist (and must act out what they "speak"), Luz was forced to take a bath three times (all her rolls had the same result) and Jessica planked at the living room. At the Luxury House, Seth continued to sit out the weekly task by talking to Big Brother at the confession room.

== Week 8 ==
- Day 50: In the early morning hours, after talking to Slater and Tol, Seth finally faced all of his housemates to share his thoughts about him joining the show and his life in the Philippines. At the Industrial House, the previous day's punishments made the housemates more conscious of their surroundings. Big Brother declared the task for both Houses a success with a 100% thumbs-up rating. With the success, the housemates discussed which charity to donate the money on. High-Voltage agreed to donate their money to organizations focusing on victims of sexual abuse; Wayuk chose an organization for elderly people. Both teams' original Christmas songs and the music videos were played over the other's house. Deniesse and Divine commented on how soothing Wayuk's song was. Unad and the others had issues with the supposed lack of originality in High-Voltage's song. After Seth and Erica were evicted, Big Brother informed the housemates that the two will be the last evictees for the year. Despite being saved from eviction, Wendy was teary-eyed because she would not be home for Christmas.
- Day 51: High-Voltage won the second main inter-House competition after hearing the comments of judges Jimmy Antiporda, Ryan Cayabyab, and Pinoy Dream Academy Season 1 winner Yeng Constantino. They also prevailed in getting the most "likes" on the Facebook music video challenge with a score of 46,752—31,537, earning for themselves a luxury item—a chocolate cake and choco-chip cookies. Wayuk were affected by their defeat. Big Brother assigned the housemates a new task to create exchange gifts for the other team and do it in one hour. In Santa costume, Jessica visited the Luxury House as Wayuk's representative and gave a special good-luck doll to the housemates, leaving Biggel obviously smitten. Deniesse reluctantly went to the Industrial house to deliver High-Voltage's "something naughty" gifts to Wayuk—despite fearing potential retaliation from Paco over the spraying incident (on Day 33), which also made her try to remove the gift for him from the delivery box until Big Brother ordered her to leave it alone. Paco gave her some of the chocolates Wayuk got from the resort pool. She came back to the Luxury House to report on the success of her visit. Since there would be no evictions for the last two weeks of the year, the nominations were for which housemates deserved the best gifts of the year. Wayuk mostly nominated Pamu, Steph, and Seichang, while the majority of High-Voltage nominated Kigoy, Biggel, and Eting. A reward challenge for the male Luxury housemates had them choosing the house's Krush ng Bayan (a play on Crush ng Bayan [National Crush]; Tagalog slang for a very physically attractive person who gets the most attention from everybody), which turned out to be Tin. They were asked to try wooing her with a heart-shaped case of blueberries. She chose Biggel and their reward was blueberry pearl shakes from KFC. Both teams were assigned their weekly task. However, as they started planning their concerts, Big Brother showed them newscasts of the destruction brought about by tropical storm Sendong, which left them saddened—especially Kigoy, who had relatives in Cagayan de Oro. The housemates were left stunned by the images and resolved to work harder for the performance, with the impetus now on raising funds for the victims. Deniesse, Joya, Carlo, and Tol—all of whom nominated Eting for his Christmas gift—were assigned as his bodyguard detail for 24 hours, during which time they must keep him at a distance from everybody else.
- Day 52: Kim was assigned to be the Industrial House's resident elf servant by doing all house chores alone. Jessica was also challenged to cook her signature special meatballs with no assistance. However, unknown to the two, an elf-like figure named Paskolokoy (portmanteau of Pasko or Christmas, and the Tagalog slang word kolokoy, or person who does foolish things) will assign the other housemates do nasty tasks for him to receive their special food for noche buena and a gift for Kim that had something to do with her father. He gave Pamu her first mission: to disrupt Jessica's cooking. When it failed because the meatballs tasted so well, she went to try stealing at least one mango from a stash Seichang was assigned to guard (he once worked as a security guard to support his studies). Since they voted for him during the Christmas nominations, Unad, Steph, Naprey, and Ryan washed as many dirty dishes and utensils as they could in one hour, given that Seichang once worked as a dishwasher. The housemates went to work on a "something big and hard" gift for Hi-Voltage, but Pamu used the opportunity to slip through and steal a mango after Seichang caught her in an earlier attempt. Big Brother ended the task, leading Seichang to claim he had all mangoes accounted for. Earlier at the Luxury House, Tol momentarily lapsed and reported having pale hands, prompting a nurse to check on him at the confession room—there was no problem with his health. However, tension erupted between Biggel, Kigoy, and Roy because the first two disturbed Carlo, who was resting at the sofa after a long night of guarding Eting. Roy was obviously flustered at Biggel and Kigoy's chronic apologies, especially Biggel's rants about being an ignorant idiot. Roy later commented to Joya and Deniesse that Biggel was gradually becoming like Kigoy, which made the girls plan an intervention. After Eting washed the dishes, he saw a circular stage in the living room where he had to perform the ukulele for five hours—and his security guards would turn it for five minutes every hour. The turning was made continuous for the final hour with Eting made to stand in the last 30 minutes. The success of the task resulted in Eting being given a picture of his wife, who waited for him in another section of the house behind a glass divider for their dinner date. The housemates also prepared their own "big and hard" gift for Wayuk—a cardboard impression of a blue fist wrapped with thunderbolts over a red field, signifying superiority over the other team. Deniesse and Jessica delivered each house's gifts once more—and both carried Kevin's messages about missing Tin. Jessica also toured the Luxury House.
- Day 53: Paskolokoy ordered Steph to sabotage Luz' task of teaching her housemates new games that she plays with her children: stop push-ups, hiding of toys, and Twister, and also deliberately scatter garbage for Kim to clean up. Steph stole two of the prize bags Luz prepared for the housemates and never got caught even as Luz noticed that the bags were missing. She later made a mess of things while Kim cooked carbonara for lunch. Reflecting on her childhood experiences about her mother not buying her a dollhouse, Big Brother tasked her to make a dollhouse for a special child. At the Luxury House, the denizens learned that no tickets have been sold for the concert, prompting everybody to start practicing. Wendy, Slater, and Kigoy went to a different section of the house to run a barbershop with ten customers while having leg weights strapped to their arms. Big Brother ruled the task a success and revealed that three of the customers are actually Kigoy's long-lost siblings (one of whom he has never seen all his life). Out of a line-up, a young woman, a skinhead boy, and a young man—all of whom sat at Kigoy's chair—stepped forward. Kigoy spent 30 minutes with them over meals. Slater and Wendy, who nominated Kigoy for the gift, acted as human timers back at the Luxury House by strapping the weights at their wrists and gradually raising them every ten minutes. The weights placed great strain on the two, leading Big Brother to cut the reunion short. Both housemates were assigned to make a "something fun" gift. Deniesse delivered High-Voltage's gift—a special puzzle—to the Industrial House and gave the male housemates ten seconds to make a perfect square. When the guys failed, she had all of them take off the shirts they wore at that moment. Deniesse returned to her house with the shirts and gave Kevin's shirt to Tin while deliberately throwing Paco's shirt to a chair. Jessica visited with the Industrials' own gift and took five minutes to get special items from all former Slums housemates.
- Day 54: At the Industrial House, Paskolokoy ordered Paco to destroy the Christmas tree. Steph was given 30 minutes to find a cellphone amidst a large pile of clothes, which are actually donations for the victims of Sendong. She later turned over the cellphone to Big Brother. Jessica, Pamu, and Seichang were given one hour to fold the clothes and organize them in specific piles for men, women, and children. Steph, Luz, and Seichang—who nominated Pamu for a special Christmas gift—were given one hour to make 100 headbands for street children. Lordwin, Reg, and Mark distributed the headbands and the clothes, while a young girl who is a polio survivor got the dollhouse. Because they have been playing around with their practice, Big Brother summoned everybody to the confession room and lambasted their dedication, prompting the housemates to be more serious. At the Luxury House, Big Brother assigned Tin to translate the show's theme song Pinoy Ako to English and later presented her version to him. Jerico, Divine, and Roy joined her at the Activity Area for their special task to have a gift for Biggel—processing the meat from 100 coconut husks into five liters of virgin coconut oil, which took several hours. The task was ruled a failure because the coconut oil was not properly processed but the housemates' determination convinced Big Brother to give Biggel's gift—a reunion with his mother after several years' estrangement. Tin's translation was broken down into 157 placards for Biggel to retrieve from the Resort pool and assemble in the proper sequence. Since Biggel had problems with the translation (due to poor English skills), Eting was brought over to the Resort to help him—and Roy et al provided assistance from the Confession Room after being shown what was going on. Eventually, Biggel got only 37 words correct, which would be equivalent to the number of minutes he would have with his mother.
- Day 55: At the Industrial House, Pamu, Steph, and Seichang were given their gifts—smartphones for Pamu and Steph while Seichang received new clothes. Pamu and Steph tried out their phones' cameras before all three of them were summoned to the confession room where they also received gifts for their loved ones—a digital camera for Pamu's aunt, gift certificates for Steph's mother, and a batch of mangoes for Seichang's grandmother. However, they were asked to decide which gift they want to keep; in the end, Pamu went for the camera, Steph kept her phone and Seichang chose the mangoes. Kim went to the confession room and got a four-minute call from her father, whom she had not seen since she was two years old and last heard from three years ago. Pamu, Steph, and Paco overheard the conversation from one of the bedrooms. The housemates participated in a KFC bucket stacking challenge to provide food for the Sendong aid workers. At the Luxury House, Slater and Tin were challenged to make a pontoon bridge spanning the length of the Resort pool using spent water jugs and bamboo poles, with the reward a chance to hold a birthday party (since their birthdays are only ten days apart). Both houses were tasked to make "something scary" gifts. Deniesse and Jessica failed in a new task to make Ryan and Carlo sing, respectively. Roy made things clear that he would direct the flow of the concert with help from Carlo and Wendy.
- Day 56: At the Industrial House, Paco confessed to Kim that he had a dream of High-Voltage's determination to use live instruments backfiring on them. Both houses immediately went ahead with the dress rehearsals, even if High-Voltage still had some kinks. A few minutes before kick-off time, Big Brother announced to both teams that singer Nina, Sex Bomb Dancers manager Joy Cancio, and director Rowell Santiago will judge the concert. He added that the top three performers on both sides will have a chance to enjoy noche buena with their loved ones who are attending the concert. Big Brother announced the results of the weekly task/inter-House battle, with the judges voting unanimously in Wayuk's favor. High-Voltage's Roy, Eting, and Divine, plus Wayuk's Paco, Jessica, and Ryan, were named as the top performers.

== Week 9 ==
- Day 57: In the early hours at the Luxury House, the housemates talked about the loved ones they saw. Wendy also cried to Big Brother that she was stunned to see her father attend the concert when he never did at her fashion shows, treating it as a sign that she should go home. All of the housemates were given a chance to be with their loved ones for only one minute while being blindfolded at the Activity Area, but Slater and Jerico did not get the shot; their loved ones left already due to other pressing engagements. The top three performers on both teams got to meet their loved ones for the feast: Eting's wife, Divine's mother, and Roy's sister for High-Voltage; Jessica and Paco's mothers, and Ryan's grandfather for Wayuk. Paskolokoy rewarded Pamu, Steph, and Paco for their earlier tasks with a special lunch of tomatoes, salted eggs, rice and fish—which Paco took as a reminder of simple things in life. Both teams were able to see the entire concert from each other's perspective, giving them a chance to see all members for the first time. Both Houses only had a PHP650 budget (PHP50 per housemate) to buy the groceries they needed for their noche buena feast, but the other team will cook their food. Deniesse and Jessica then delivered the food to Wayuk and High-Voltage, respectively. Big Brother gathered everybody at midnight for a Christmas toast.
- Day 58: The Luxury and Industrial housemates woke up to the sound of ballroom dance music, which gave them clues about their next inter-House battle. Two dance instructors checked out the Luxury housemates at the Activity Area and taught them chacha, samba, and tango before pairing them off. The housemates were given their new weekly tasks (see below) At the Luxury House, Kigoy confessed to Big Brother about the emotions he felt upon seeing so many lost siblings in just a few days. Both houses also attended the Christmas Mass. Two other dance instructors visited the Industrial House to start the training, with Naprey tasked to observe because he didn't have a partner.
- Day 59: Noting some of the flaws in their own housemates, all the Luxury girls were made to wear face masks of Jerico (and later, Roy) and fully ape their mannerisms, right down to the clothes. The boys responded by mirroring Wendy (who was not affected) and Divine. The Industrials' weekly task kicked off with them seeing a mound of dirt that had three "No" tags and a wall littered with "Yes" graffiti at the confession room. Luz and Pamu agreed to Big Brother's question about donating all their own clothes to the Sendong survivors. Paskolokoy finally appeared to all the housemates as Coollokoy (wearing shades and hip clothes), seeking revenge for their success the previous week. The housemates went to the Activity Area to continue their practice while Naprey stayed behind to clean the house—and Coollokoy had somebody dye him blonde. Kevin was challenged not to groom himself for the entire week but Steph refused to have her hair redone after seeing digital images of herself superimposed with various hairstyles, resulting in her taking off one "No" tag from the dirt mound. Big Brother revealed to the female housemates why Steph refused her task, which made Luz volunteer to do.
- Day 60: In the morning hours at the Industrial House, Pamu and Luz were able to borrow clothes from Ryan and Kim. Kim and Kevin were ordered by Coollokoy to do makeup on each other, then applied it to the other housemates. They later went to the Activity Area for another training session. Although Naprey was left out of the inter-House battle, Big Brother gave him a secret task to train anyway with help from another visitor—a professional wheelchair ballroom dancer—and one of Wayuk's dance coaches. Luz' newfound confidence with her hair left Kim and Steph feeling regret over not stepping forward. Noting their fair skin, Jessica and Steph accepted a challenge to get a spray tan, which was later upgraded to a black skintone. The housemates teased Paco for details about his girlfriend At the Luxury House, the housemates were made to put polka dots all over their skin, to which they played a touching game wherein they had to put their body parts on any of Kigoy's body parts. Tol's team won over Joya's team on a 3–1 score, winning a batch of doughnuts while the losers got sour candy. Jerico and Tin successfully counted the number of polka dots on Deniesse and Joya, who jumped on the trampolines for one hour—the assignment was part of the weekly task. The housemates who were mirrored the day before were made to write their resolutions according to what their other housemates wanted to see them change. They continued their practice.
- Day 61: At the Industrial House, Steph and Jessica succeeded in their tanning challenge. Coollokoy 's mischief continued by making Ryan converse in a loud voice (because he was soft-spoken) and for Unad to cook pacham (a vegetable dish) for Paco and Kevin. They later drank lambanog wine to wash down the food. Steph, Paco, and Seichang were asked if they wanted to have a cigarette and when they said "Yes," they got one stick each—but no lighter. Paco said yes to Big Brother's suggestion of having a new girlfriend, and went to the storage room to find a life-size ballerina (his ex being a ballet dancer) doll that would pose as his make-believe girlfriend; he named it Veronica (for manika or doll). Inside the Luxury House, Jerico, Wendy, and Tin were assigned a new part of their weekly task—to handle a special crystal ball but must hide it from the rest of the housemates. The ball's first predictions (which the trio will engineer) was the disappearance of all plates in the house, while a male and female housemate—Biggel and Joya—will suffer three misfortunes and strokes of luck, respectively. The sub-task failed because Deniesse had ideas about what they were doing and Biggel noted Wendy and Tin's rather deliberate disruptions during their practice. Kigoy and Tol later discovered the plates. A local radio station's resident psychic gave predictions for 2012 to the housemates—all except Roy, Carlo, and Tol (for personal and religious reasons). Because Wendy had problems with her dancing practice, her sister came to the Activity Area to try a sample routine with the housemates watching inside the house—and Wendy was left stunned by her sibling's moves, since she had never watched her perform ever.
- Day 62: The Industrial housemates received their special cash prize for winning the concert battle before heading for another practice session, where the instructors pushed them harder. However, they found the money bag missing after returning from the Activity Area (even Naprey never noticed it missing); Coollokoy challenged them to split into pairs and find it all over the house, only admitting that it was in the dirt mound after they failed. Kevin's special task was given an added challenge—not to use deodorant and not change clothes. Coollokoy also played around with him, which finally gave him a chance to bathe again. Paco eventually "let go" of Nika by bringing her back to the storage room, later admitting to Big Brother that it may be a sign that he really had to finally move on from his lost love. Naprey later practiced at the Activity Area. Meanwhile, at the Luxury House, Tin finally reunited with her dogs as a birthday gift from Big Brother. Wendy, who was still afraid of the canines, was ordered to bring their feeding bowls into the house. During another practice session, the instructors got irritated with Wendy's sloppy moves and failure to look into Carlo's eyes. Wendy, Jerico, and Tin were issued the next challenge of their weekly task—to balance one end of a long pole with the number 2012 on the palm of their hands for 2,012 seconds (33 minutes and 32 seconds) and must accumulate a total of two hours to succeed. Only Eting, Roy, and Biggel got through. Big Brother gave the girls a bonus challenge to balance the pole again for the same length of time to get additional eggs. They failed. Eting, Roy, and Biggel were tasked to balance the pole and transfer it to the other housemates within another 2,012 seconds, which they also lost. The girls also got their special dresses for the duel.
- Day 63: The inter-House battle finally went underway after the housemates conducted their dress rehearsals. Entertainment choreographer Maribeth Bichara, Professional Dancesports of the Philippines president Belinda Adora, former Philippine Dance Teachers Association vice-president Louie Tan, and PBB Season 1 winner Nene Tamayo served as the judges. During the showdown, where both sets of housemates finally saw each other in person for the very first time, team Wayuk were surprised to see Naprey perform his special number. High-Voltage pairs prevailed in all three categories—Jerico/Divine (chacha), Slater/Tin(samba), and Carlo/Wendy (tango). After the awarding, High-Voltage chose partners from Wayuk for a jive dance exhibition (except Tol, Naprey, and Biggel).

== Week 10 ==
- Day 64: At the Industrial House, Unad refused Big Brother's challenge to automatically nominate a housemate, resulting in all housemates being forced to choose. Ryan selected Kevin, leading Big Brother to declare the task as success. The teams faced off in a special challenge involving counting down the seconds inside cuckoo clocks for eight hours. The object was to count off the exact time without having the time count go advanced, with certain housemates acting as the clock birds sounding every hour. The reward was to have a team being allowed to go to the outside world to usher in the New Year. During a certain point in the counting at the Luxury House, Kigoy got irked by comments from Slater and Tin, to which he made remarks about "waiting for people outside." High-Voltage won the challenge as their clock sounded the eighth hour just 55 seconds off the actual time as opposed to Wayuk's 15 minutes. The team's success in the challenge was also ruled as the fifth and final challenge of the Luxury House's weekly task. Wayuk celebrated the New Year at the Resort while High-Voltage went to an unspecified rooftop location.
- Day 65: The Luxury housemates woke up to the sound of TV Patrol's opening billboard music, which was a clue for a new weekly task. An audition on how to read the teleprompter eventually resulted in Wendy, Tol and Joya being chosen as the anchors. At the Industrial house, the residents were tasked to write the various traits they don't like about each housemate on their skin. The housemate must choose one of the traits they want to discard in 2012 and write it on a cement block they would smash. Kevin also woke up with a bad case of hyperacidity, prompting doctors to check up on him at the confession room and put him at the storage room with an IV drip connected. The next HOH game was held - a bike race wherein both teams needed to go from one end to the other in the slowest possible time without crossing into the other lane or putting their feet on the ground. Given Naprey's condition, he chose Steph to represent him. Seichang and Jerico won.
- Day 66: The Industrials woke up to the sound of opening doors, which made Paco theorize about a potential switching of houses. Big Brother ordered them to pack their bags, which were later sent to the living room of the Luxury house. Its housemates woke up to the sound of airliners, saw their luggage on the living room and were ordered to pack up as well. Big Brother dropped hints about three special doors. He opened the secret tunnel linking both Luxury and Industrial Houses (triggering a reunion with the people at the other house), and the second being the access path to the Resort. The first mini inter-House skirmish of the year took place, during which the housemates had to climb rope ladders over the pool to get flaglets and tag the next person. High-Voltage won, 10–6, but not before Kigoy blew his top again over being supposedly ganged up by the team, especially when Carlo shouted in his face regarding the game instructions. The game would be the first of several for the entire week; the team who won the most games will get to pick people from the losing team to be slaves. They also got a chance to bond with each other. Seichang and Luz were ordered to return to the Industrial House and get their fellow housemates' clothes. Big Brother held auditions for BB Patrol's (a spoof of TV Patrol) field reporters, wherein they had to make a report out of certain videos. Roy and Kigoy were chosen. During the nomination broadcast, where both sets of housemates were brought together at the Luxury House living room, Big Brother announced that the third door was actually the exit to the outside world, which opened. He gave them a few minutes to think about a voluntary exit. In the end, Big Brother announced to the housemates that Wayuk will be staying on the Luxury house and Team High-Voltage will be staying on the Industrial house. He added that the door to the outside world would not be opened until eviction night and no voluntary exits will ever be entertained. After High-Voltage left, the new Luxury housemates were told that the Resort is open at all times. The houses' new occupants found their places in disarray (although Luz and Seichang indeed cleaned up the Industrial House before they left), prompting a cleanup. Roy and Kigoy were given their own typewriters to compose their scripts, which they did all night long.
- Day 67: The new Luxury housemates woke up to the sound of Kolokoy shrieking in pain at the living room, apparently losing his hand after trying to get away with a prize money bag. The situation was a clue for their new weekly task. Steph took over the training, giving them various lectures on basic first aid and pre-natal delivery. At the Industrial House, Kigoy continued to type his script, which some housemates thought as too long for a report. Big Brother made a casting call for a showbiz reporter. High-Voltage visited again for more bonding time and a new inter-House mini-game. The object of the mini-game was for the housemates to transport coal to a collection point without getting their white jumpsuits stained while passing through a web of garter strips. Wayuk, having figured out their plan of attack, won the challenge. Kim and Deniesse used gay lingo to talk about the early days in the house and how Kim was irked seeing Mark hit on Steph. The Industrials tested their showbiz reporting skills. Big Brother ruled, with the Luxury housemates' help, that Deniesse's blind item spiel earned her the assignment. After High-Voltage returned to the Industrial house, Deniesse started composing interviews on Wayuk using ten questions, choosing Steph, Jessica, and Luz as her potential subjects. BB Patrol's pilot broadcast went underway, where Deniesse got to interview Steph, Kigoy and Roy reported about the recent inter-House minigames, and a "breaking news" hinting at supposed inconsistencies about Biggel's life story and his supposed "first times" inside the house. The revelation struck Biggel hard and the housemates were split on whether the claims were real.
- Day 68: At the Luxury House pool, the housemates responded to Jessica drowning and Luz convulsing after "swallowing" watusi firecrackers - which were actually ruses ordered by Kolokoy. He also played a game with Pamu, who was tasked to help undo some of her housemates whose arms were tied up - with snacks as reward. Paco made meat pies for High-Voltage's next visit. The next minigame had both teams being shown certain pictures and to guess the headlines. High-Voltage won on a 4-3 score. At the Industrial house, Biggel was still left reeling from the revelations, prompting him to skip breakfast with them and also being depressed during the Luxury visit. Big Brother spent several hours talking to him about it later that night, showing pictures from his early years and asking him to explain them all.
- Day 69: Paco submitted a urine sample to Kolokoy, who made him pose as a pregnant woman with Jessica being the "father." The rest of the housemates acted as the maternity ward crew delivering the baby from in-labor to post-natal care. They later looked after the "baby" named Chichi. At the Industrial House, the long session Biggel had with Big Brother at the confession room left him physically drained that he did not join a dancing session with the housemates. They later underwent auditions for BB Patrol's trivia reporter job (patterned after Matanglawin host Kim Atienza), during which the Luxury housemates judged Eting as the best pick. During the news program's broadcast to both houses, Big Brother announced that he will be temporarily attending to other engagements, turning over the House to Kolokoy. Having recomposed himself, Biggel told the housemates about his confession room session. He and Slater were later chosen to sit out the main inter-House battle. Eting and Kigoy were disqualified for using their hands during the game. High-Voltage won after dealing much damage to Wayuk's banners.
- Day 70: At the Industrial house, Biggel, Carlo, and Slater donned costumes as a bull, bear, and pig, respectively, which Eting featured in his BB Patrol segment. The final part of the weekly task had certain distractions (such as the teleprompter having distorted news copies). Host Robi Domingo also appeared in a segment about his trip to Iligan City to donate the Give Big Love concert proceeds and the clothes. During the show, Wendy gave hints about a game-changing element called "Intensity 7," leaving all housemates speculating as to its nature. With the defeat of Wayuk in the week's games, the whole group were made to serve Team High-Voltage as they visited the Luxury House. The visitors left with Kolokoy ordering Kim to be their solo servant. The order made her cry and actually consider a voluntary exit, if not for Big Brother's earlier directive. Pamu and Steph joined her in the other house as she worked. All three later returned to the Luxury House with gifts in hand. Kolokoy assigned Kevin and Seichang to get clothes from their fellow housemates and make a special dress and table for Pamu's princess-theme birthday the following day. They should also get a kiss from her to be her princes. Pamu was given a chance to choose a pair of shoes at the Activity Area in exchange for a PHP1,000 food budget on her party.

== Week 11 ==
- Day 71: Paco and Luz visited the Industrial house to cook High-Voltage's breakfast. Big Brother returned and ordered everybody to pack their bags. Pamu suited up in a special dress (replacing the custom dress Kevin made) for her birthday party at the Resort. After Kigoy's eviction was announced, his mother came to fetch him at the confession room. When Kim left after one last chat with Big Brother at the confession room, Big Brother announced that only 14 out of the remaining 20 housemates will remain by the end of the week, with six of them to be known the following night (through public voting). They were all directed to transfer to the Industrial House. Paco, Kevin, and Ryan quickly reoccupied their old spaces. Big Brother ordered them to simply pull out one week's worth of clothes from their baggage.
- Day 72: Despite living under one house together with team High-Voltage, team Wayuk were ordered to keep up their assignment as slaves. Paco still expressed disgust at the team's misfortune. Carlo and Deniesse were tasked to pick three Wayuk members who have worked the hardest to become normal housemates again - settling in on Unad, Naprey, and Pamu. The remaining male slaves later acted out scenes "on TV" using a remote control given to Roy. Big Brother eventually ended the task for all of them. Biggel, Paco, Jessica, Tin, Seichang, and Slater returned to the Luxury House as part of the top 14 housemates. Since both teams succeeded in their weekly task, they got fresh supplies and sent some to the people in the Luxury House.
- Day 73: Big Brother asked those left behind at the house about what to do if they were on their last day inside. Wendy cooked nilagang bulalo or braised bone marrow (even if she doesn't normally cook at all), Divine wrote a poem for High-Voltage, Kevin made bracelets for Wayuk, Deniesse belly-danced, Eting sang a special farewell song, Pamu lip-synced Celine Dion's "Because You Loved Me", and Carlo made cocktails for a toast. During the Unlinight broadcast, the Luxury house residents got to view footage from Kigoy, Tol, and Luz' commentary on the Unliday show regarding the people still inside the House. Wendy, Carlo, Kevin, and Pamu rejoined their friends at the Luxury House as part of the top 14. Upon being asked by Big Brother whom they would pick among their teammates left behind to be part of the list, High-Voltage chose Eting and Wendy volunteered to give up her slot for him. However, Eting declined her offer as the group decided to keep the status quo out of respect for the voting public. The High-Voltage and Wayuk housemates at the Luxury House picked shoeboxes with four red roses and one black rose. Wendy and Jessica drew the black roses, giving them the power to decide in three minutes (the countdown clock was also shown at the Industrial house) which of their teammates would be excluded from the list - or those left behind will be out of the running altogether. They were asked to return to the Industrial house and stamp X marks on their choice; their hesitation resulted in the task being given to Paco and Slater because the task weighed heavily on the two female housemates. Jerico and Steph, who were given the marks, went to the Luxury House to console their housemates. The Luxury housemates were also given their new weekly task, but tension sparked right away between Paco and Slater during the initial design sessions.
- Day 74: At the Luxury House, Tin asked Big Brother about possibly saving Divine, which resulted in coded messages being shown on both houses' TV screens. Pamu, Kevin, and Seichang requested to save Ryan. To pass the time at the Industrial House, Joya, Deniesse, and Divine decided to make predictions for some of their housemates one year on. Tin and Pamu were issued walkie-talkies to help Divine and Ryan cross over before sunrise, without the other team knowing. Their final challenge to admit Divine and Ryan had the two of them wearing helmets with a hook and putting them through an electric wire maze within two hours. Tin, Slater, and Paco carried Divine. Divine's team got through the challenge, but were forced to do it again after Big Brother discovered that her helmet was off her head. They succeeded in the second attempt and Divine and Tin slipped back to the Industrial house to get Divine's luggage. Kevin, Carlo, and Pamu lost in their own wire challenge to save Ryan (they made at least 60 attempts during the time period). Carlo later implied to Big Brother that he deliberately made a half-hearted effort in the challenge to ensure Ryan's exit.
- Day 75: The Industrial housemates noticed Divine no longer among them, but passed the time by reminiscing about the events of the past few weeks. The High-Voltage members at the Luxury house rejoiced in Divine's entry while the Wayuk members also noticed Pamu's sadness (at losing Ryan, which she has not been allowed to talk about yet). During the Unliday broadcast, Divine was asked by Bianca about her closeness with Slater and Tin. Eting finally landed his slot and transferred to the Luxury House after spending five hours teaching Biggel and Seichang to play the ukulele (despite a raft of distractions; Big Brother only gave them three chances to hit the right notes). Big Brother finally revealed the truth about the wire challenges and Carlo's sabotage to the rest of Team Wayuk, who were asked to keep quiet as they returned to assembling the contraptions.
- Day 76: The Luxury housemates watched Unad, Deniesse, Joya, and Naprey participate in a special tell-all challenge to answer questions and dares from Big Brother to reach a special key that would ensure their top 14 entry. The questions ranged from whoever was already irritated at Big Brother to housemates naming the people they ever nominated (despite a rule against revealing the nature of nominations). Unad and Naprey were eliminated early on, but Joya and Deniesse, who were equally closest to the key, declined to do the final dare - smashing Eting's ukulele, leaving the Luxury housemates to vote on whoever will get the slot. All voted for Joya, while Wayuk agreed to pick Unad. Roy skipped the challenge and Big Brother removed him from any further challenges to enter the list because of his comments about landing a slot at the expense of more deserving people. To have another chance to enter the list, Deniesse was tasked to create six out of nine designs using cube puzzle pieces in three hours. All the while, her friends and mother sent audio messages cheering her on. Four members from each team, plus Unad and Joya, participated in a challenge to kneel together on a circular arrangement of medicine balls with one member from the other team with them (Eting with Wayuk and Paco with High-Voltage). Although there were number of mishaps, High-Voltage stayed on the balls the longest at 14 minutes and 31 seconds (against Wayuk's longest at 9:40), earning Joya her spot. Back at the Luxury house, Paco hinted to his teammates that during the challenge, High-Voltage spoke ill words about Wayuk even within his earshot, which prompted him to assure Joya about making his full effort (citing the story of the stranger who helped Jesus carry the cross).
- Day 77: Having landed a slot in the top 14, Joya entered the Luxury house in the middle of the night and cooked breakfast for the housemates. The Luxury housemates finally completed their weekly task after doing their test runs the previous night. Deniesse almost gave up in finishing the sixth puzzle, but Big Brother offered her a chance to enter the top 14 - as a team Wayuk member. She refused (out of team loyalty) and eventually completed the task in ten hours and 35 minutes. Since she already finished past the allotted time, Paco and Slater were tasked to complete their own cube puzzles, which resulted in Paco fetching Deniesse at the tunnel. However, since Paco finished the task ahead of Slater, Deniesse was forcibly included on team Wayuk's roster, thereby completing the top 14. The other housemates marked for eviction were assigned to assault the Luxury house as zombies, carrying off Biggel, Eting, Pamu, and Seichang (whom they named as their ideal Big Four contenders) for a zombie-theme party in another area.

== Week 12 ==
- Day 78: During the eviction broadcast, Naprey and Roy delivered special messages to their respective teams while Big Brother announced that the money that the teams won from the inter-House competitions were divided among the top 14, with Steph, Jerico and Roy handing out the checks. The top 14 housemates had 100-second reunions with their soon-to-be-evicted companions. Big Brother gave them some parting words of advice before being sent on their way back to the outside world. The Industrial house was formally closed down with their departure. Big Brother revealed to the top 14 that Intensity 7 is only the beginning of more game-changing elements called "Aftershocks"; the first of which would be the addition of a second High-Voltage member to team Wayuk (to balance out the numbers). The housemates also had a club party at the Resort, where everybody played I never and did sexually suggestive dares spinning the bottle.
- Day 79: Dermatologist Vicky Belo and her daughter Cristale visited the house and treated everybody to a facial. Team Wayuk identified Eting, Carlo, and Slater as potential additions to their roster. The trio were cloistered in another room while uniformed dummies of them (at 1/4th their actual body weight) were hung by rope over the Resort pool. The rest of High-Voltage underwent an endurance challenge to see who could hold on to them in three hours, with five people holding the rope of one dummy every hour and eventually one person for one dummy in the last hour. As the weight took its toll, Biggel hinted about sacrificing one man, with Carlo and Eting as their choices. However, in the last four minutes, Slater's dummy slipped from Joya's grasp, resulting in him joining Wayuk.
- Day 80: A thief infiltrated the Luxury house in the early morning hours and made off with some specific items (after noticing Carlo wake up while casing the High-Voltage room). Divine, Seichang, Carlo, and Kevin started attending a Tagalog-language class and also talked about the break-in with the other housemates. Big Brother later brought in two agents from the NBI to question the housemates, some of whom hinted at an inside job. They also talked about their own experiences with criminals and also watched news reports of various crimes. The housemates eventually added more security measures to the house. Joya taught an English-language class with Biggel and Eting as her students.
- Day 81: Tin and Wendy of High Voltage and Wayuk's Seichang and Deniesse were asked to identify their housemates who have committed the seven deadly sins since they entered the house. Various names surfaced over the course of the deliberations: Tin (gluttony), Wendy (lust), Kevin (sloth and gluttony), Biggel (greed, wrath, and envy), Paco (wrath, greed and pride), and Pamu (envy). Both teams were informed of their sins by being made to stand and be photographed akin to police lineups. Big Brother later dropped the investigation and returned the housemates' stolen items.
- Day 82: Because Kevin was marked for sloth, he immediately stepped up by cleaning the dishes. Big Brother challenged him to cook and to clean the camera mirrors at the same time. He later cooked fish as the housemates' dinner - but he and Tin were made to eat only crackers as a consequence of their gluttony. A top trial lawyer questioned Paco, Pamu, and Biggel in a mock court about their offenses. Biggel later had a slight cut as Eting tried to cut his left armpit hair. The teams were informed about their latest House Competition and underwent a forensic investigation workshop. Because of her lust offense, Wendy was sent to another room littered with pictures of Carlo to watch previous footage of him, especially those depicting the two's most intimate moments during the club party on Day 78 (which irked Wendy's boyfriend during an interview on the afternoon show). Carlo joined her at the room for an intimate date during which they talked about her relationship problems (with the housemates watching them). They spent the night in the same room.
- Day 83: Wendy and Carlo woke up to hear an audio clip of her boyfriend's rants before they returned to the house. Pamu and Biggel were made to hit the showers at the sound of running water several times during the day as punishment for taking baths beyond the shower call. They could only bathe for 100 seconds each turn, with one housemates counting each other off. The housemates were assigned their weekly task. They went ahead with their investigation; Wendy/Joya and Deniesse/Paco questioned the subjects while the others studied the evidence at the crime scene. Deniesse and Slater, plus the rest of High-Voltage, were visibly displeased with Paco's gloating about a vital clue in the murder case (which Slater figured out) that resulted in their victory. Tin and Kevin were sent to a room stocked with cooked food (one of which was her mother's kare-kare) to test their ability to resist the sight - while Biggel and Eting ate in their presence. The housemates were given their weekly task and started working.
- Day 84: The failure of the task led to Paco making an off-handed comment about Big Brother's ruling - to which Big Brother admonished him at the confession room. The housemates celebrated Toni's birthday inside the house together with her co-hosts and her boyfriend.

== Week 13 ==
- Day 85: In the morning, Slater joined the rest of his former teammates in sharing their feelings about the nomination without discussing their choices. As part of a Chinese New Year theme, the housemates dressed up according to their Chinese zodiac signs. A feng shui expert predicted their fortunes for 2012 as well as cooking misua soup for breakfast and exercising with a tai chi master. They were also asked about their compatibility. Tin, Slater, Joya, Pamu and Divine - who were all identified to be compatible with each other - were tasked to cook handmade noodles and yang chow fried rice. The nominees were identified by picking up fortune cookies with red slips of paper. Big Brother ordered Slater and Tin not to partake of the feast unless they could create the noodle dough properly (after catching them slice the dough earlier); he eventually stopped the task. Paco and Deniesse posed as an old couple doing the compatibility rite of cai shao. The pairings - Kevin/Tin, Carlo/Wendy, and Seichang/Pamu - were sent to another room to watch a seven-episode sneak preview of the latest chapter in the Precious Hearts Romances drama anthology. Deniesse acted as a showbiz reporter interviewing the group after the session. Pamu and Deniesse were warned against bringing the throw pillow outside and were ordered to lean against Biggel and Carlo. They were later made to sleep in the resort along with Seichang and Eting (for moving certain structures).
- Day 86: Jessica broke down and told Slater about being supposedly ganged on by High-Voltage's women. Divine showed disgust at being made to wear a girl's uniform for their Tagalog class and Big Brother punished her by making her wear the uniform with the skirt for the whole day. Later on, all housemates washed their clothes in the traditional Filipino washing methods of using a basin and a small paddle to squeeze out the water, but with a twist: the clothes they are hitting with the paddle would represent the people who tormented them all their lives, with each housemate having their own emotional stories to tell. The housemates started assembling their traps for the challenge using resources provided by Big Brother, with Kevin and Tin in charge of their respective teams. Each team assigned two members to be on lookout for the rats all night, with Jessica and Paco for Wayuk and Biggel/Eting of High-Voltage for the first shift.
- Day 87: At the Tagalog class, the students were assigned to outline their family trees and explain it all. Divine no longer had qualms about wearing skirts. Seichang also cooked Japanese fried rice using some cold rice he and Kevin found on the table. For the weekly task, the nominees were given 24 hours to memorize all the housemates' Chinese names and the accompanying Chinese characters, which are written on white shirts. They were also made to do tasks for certain housemates (such as giving items to the housemate concerned with orders not to do anything with them until Big Brother signals them). At night, the housemates were assigned to do a dance number using the Showtime theme song while the TV showed the traps under watch. Wayuk snared one rat, but the rodent slipped out of the trap, the design of which High-Voltage later copied.
- Day 88: Matteo Guidicelli, Maja Salvador, and Xian Lim visited the Luxury House and dated Deniesse, Biggel, and Pamu. Divine and Slater became their waiters with Eting providing the entertainment. The three actors were in the house for the red-carpet premiere of their movie My Cactus Heart (which the housemates were clued in about when they brought in a set of cacti inside the house; Wendy and Deniesse won a contest to tell the most-heartbreaking love stories, but Wendy gave her slot to Pamu out of respect for her own boyfriend). Paco, Carlo and Jessica pulled off a prank on Guidicelli and Lim by throwing a plastic rat at them. The two also dressed up as temporary housemates, but reiterated their work commitments, prompting them to kiss the female housemates and embrace the men over two minutes before leaving. After hearing a CD message from her mother, Tin had a discussion with Big Brother about living up to her family name.
- Day 89: Paco gathered Team Wayuk to talk about Slater's recent remarks regarding High-Voltage's copying of his design and their feelings about their old comrades. Deniesse later discussed the matter with the rest of High-Voltage, which planned new tactics after a rat slipped from one of their traps during the night. Jessica, who carried a pack of fake rats on her person for days, was tasked to run a series of pranks on her housemates so she could be relieved of them. The four nominees successfully embarked on the second part of their weekly task. Noting the way the housemates were conducting the challenge, Big Brother warned them that their health is also at risk from handling the rats, prompting everybody to step up their trap assembly. During a lull in the surveillance, he also warned the housemates that they only had 24 hours left to finish the competition.
- Day 90: With less than 12 hours left in the countdown, Big Brother hinted to the housemates about two consequences if neither team were able to catch at least one rat - the first of which would be the teams nominating one of their members up front. The teams scrambled to set up one last trap - black sheets filled with food that would be pulled up - but time ran out before one rat could even appear.
- Day 91: Big Brother questioned each housemate over their contributions in the challenge. Tin was criticized over failing to step up as High-Voltage's assigned leader while Paco talked about the nature of Slater's actions.

== Week 14 ==
- Day 92: Biggel underwent a workout at Carlo's hands before Joya administered one last English exam to him and Eting. Jessica told Big Brother that she was feeling lonely in the house and no longer had the motivation to continue staying. The original Wayuk men talked about their feelings towards Slater and Deniesse and the dangers of potential nominations if High-Voltage won the next challenges. Slater and Deniesse also talked about Paco's sense of team politics. The housemates performed a special dance number. During the eviction broadcast, Big Brother gave a sermon about the housemates' lack of dedication during the House Challenge and lamented that none of them deserved to be the season winners.
- Day 93: The housemates held a drawing activity wherein they were made to sketch various events in their lives. Deniesse was allowed a chance to text her family and friends. Jessica was meted a forced eviction for her despair. As a final task, she crossed out the pictures of her and Wendy at their dining room chairs and wrote "I QUIT" on a mirror using a red spray-paint can. Jessica marked Wendy as someone who does not deserve to be part of the Big Four, let alone be the Big Winner. Wendy found out about the purpose of the task when she was summoned to the confession room after Jessica left. Both teams later went separately to the Activity Area, which was lit only with torches, for their nomination night. They nominated by burning pictures of their choice in front of the person, who will be given an X spray mark by a red-suited police officer. All the other members of High-Voltage voted for Wendy, who burned Carlo's picture. The surviving original Wayuk members chose Deniesse, who nominated Seichang, while Slater voted for Paco.
- Day 94: In the early morning hours, Wendy and Deniesse were made to lip read a secret message from Big Brother - which turned out to be a special operation for Tin, Kevin, and Pamu outside the House, called The Big Road Trip. They were tasked to go out of town for a series of assignments which should be completed and the three returning to the House by dusk - or Wendy or Deniesse could be force-evicted. The life sketches they made the day before were turned into their new weekly task, choosing Eting's life story as the subject matter. Biggel, Slater, and Divine were assigned to choose any one of four party packages for Wendy's birthday. They chose a package of food and drinks for all and a loved one as a guest- but they would have to do four secret tasks. The first task was for each individual to get inside a special booth where they should take turns uttering Wendy's catchphrase "Utang na loob!!!" (English lit. debt of gratitude, but uttered as expletive) non-stop for 24 hours.
- Day 95: The task was a failure because Eting left the booth in the early morning hours. Wendy, Deniesse and Eting were assigned to construct a long pathway connecting the two doors at the Activity Area, where Tin, Kevin, and Pamu would pass on the way back. The two female housemates, who wore Filipiniana costumes, also cooked food for the travellers and for themselves (as they could not return to the Luxury House for lunch). They also scooped up PHP5 coins from the pool to serve as the trio's allowance. Big Brother gave Tin, Kevin, and Pamu a cellphone to remain in contact with the House while ordering them not to gather information about the outside world and to scramble back to their vehicle in case anybody discovered them. The trio left early in the morning and made their first stop at Malvar, Batangas for Kevin to pay courtesy calls on his grandmother and to have a 100-second reunion with his mother (which had to be done without anybody in the house knowing about it; Unad and Lordwin assisted in the task). Pamu and Tin entered the Lipa campus of Batangas State University in uniform to take a picture at her old classroom. They later went to buy some food items at the Lipa Bus Terminal to be delivered at Tin's house in Cainta, where she had a 100-second reunion with her mother. However, since Tin and Pamu entered the BSU campus during lunch break, some students actually recognized the two underneath their disguises, plus being identified at the terminal resulting in a 30-minute stopover penalty. Despite being forced to stop for another 15 minutes because Tin waved to the guard at their subdivision, they were able to get back to the House before dusk even if Deniesse and Wendy were half-finished with the pathway. The project was completed in roughly six hours.
- Day 96: Big Brother ruled the Road Trip a failure as the travelers were threatened with one of them being automatically nominated. Wendy and Deniesse explained the whole situation to the housemates. The travelers underwent a special math challenge based on their experiences during the trip. Tin was automatically nominated after failing the last part of the challenge.
- Day 97: Because the booth task was a failure, the housemates were ordered to assemble costumes for a fashion show using various pieces of garbage - but someone else would design Wendy's outfit. The task was declared a success. The third task was for them to pair up and secretly practice singing a Bahasa Indonesia version of the ballad Please Be Careful with my Heart. Since the male housemates outnumber the female housemates, Carlo distracted Wendy. However, the task was again a failure because Kevin and Slater missed some lines during the test run at the confession room. The last task was for the housemates to shed 12 pounds off their collective body weight in just one day - which concerned Tin because she gained at least 20 since entering the House. They eventually shed 45 lbs total. Since they only finished two tasks, they settled on a package of food and drinks for four people only. Wendy, who found out about the tasks for the first time, chose Deniesse, Tin, and Pamu to join her in the feast, where her boyfriend - actually Carlo wearing a mask of the boyfriend's face - appeared.
- Day 98: During the afternoon show, Wendy and Deniesse were sent to the confession room to answer questions from the public and Big Brother, who asked them both who deserved to be the overall season winner. To identify the choices, Wendy hugged Eting and Deniesse embraced Pamu.

== Week 15 ==
- Day 99: The housemates woke up to find the Resort door locked and the air-conditioner too cold, prompting Big Brother to provide them with winter clothing. They were clued in by Big Brother about a supposed Big Swap. During the eviction show, Wendy and Deniesse said goodbye to the housemates before being sent to the pathway they made at the Activity Area. Instead of Toni announcing the name of the evictee, Kevin was asked to give the evictee her luggage - which turned out to be Wendy.
- Day 100: Paco was informed of his automatic nomination at the confession room over his recent conversations with Seichang and Kevin about his fears of nomination if Wayuk lost any future House Competitions. He was also ordered not to inform anybody - even the rest of team Wayuk - of his nomination, lest they suffer a major consequence. Basketball players Anthony and David Semerad entered the house posing as housemates from Big Brother Czech called Antonik and Imerich Novak and were given their marching orders from Big Brother for the House Competition (see below). The housemates gave them a traditional Czech welcome, which included drinking beer and eating sausages. The two chose Divine and Paco as the housemates who would participate in the supposed Swap. After being briefed on their House Competition, Seichang and Eting started their snooping.
- Day 101: Divine and Paco were ordered to pack up and leave the house while those left behind participated in a Philippine-theme beach photo shoot. Seichang's suspicions picked up when the twins refused to take their shirts off (because Antonik had a Philippine sunburst tattoo on his left bicep). Divine and Paco taught themselves some Czech while the other housemates were quizzed on the Czech language and had to teach the twins Tagalog. Deniesse and Pamu showed the housemates pictures of the Novaks' supposed housemates back home and asked the two to describe them. In another version of the Big Road Trip, Big Brother assigned Biggel and Slater to go to Marinduque for another set of tasks, with the reward being two weeks budget - or zero budget for the same period and automatic nomination if they failed. They left within minutes.
- Day 102: As the housemates prepared breakfast, Tin guessed that the two are actually on the island-province (as are Divine and Paco, who did not actually head to the Czech Republic). Since Seichang and Eting learned more about the twins, Big Brother tasked them to find more hard evidence by the end of the day to declare the Competition a success. The twins found Seichang loitering inside the High-Voltage room (where their belongings were) on two occasions, prompting Antonik to tell Carlo that Seichang was checking out his protein shake. Carlo said the twins are now being paranoid with the snooping. Antonik even gestured that Seichang and Eting may be gay lovers since they are often in the same room. Meanwhile, in Marinduque, Slater and Biggel ran into some problems driving their jeep to the town of Boac while Paco and Divine rode a canoe. Both pairings were given five missions to complete in a 14-hour timeframe. Slater and Biggel's tasks included buying their own lunch from the Boac public market and to take a picture with Biggel's pet cattle. They kept in contact by cellphone on the way to Biggel's house in Gasan, where Paco and Divine picked up Biggel's grandparents and brought them to a nearby church for a 100-second reunion with their grandson.
- Day 103: As time ran out in the early hours, Seichang and Eting correctly confirmed to Big Brother that the twins are not official housemates, but have Filipino blood and can speak Tagalog. Seichang landed the clincher: he found the Competition pot money in the twins' belongings. Pamu and Carlo were informed of the truth and were allowed to tell their housemates, Biggel and Slater having returned in the meantime. With the announcement of the results and after the housemates played a prank, the twins finally came clean about their identities before Paco and Divine reappeared.
- Day 104: Anthony and David took the job of coaching Wayuk and High-Voltage, respectively, for their next House Competition, with the training taking place all day long. They also played a standard 3-on-3 match, with High-Voltage winning on a 16-6 score
- Day 105: The last House Competition took place with the housemates playing NBA 2K12 on the PS3, an arcade basketball shooting game (with the housemates wearing goggles in reverse), and underwater basketball in the pool (where the ball has to be put upwards through the hoops). Biggel was ejected over his unruly conduct during the pool game, which included unintentionally elbowing other players in trying to wave them off from the ball. Tin was praised for scoring the most points for High-Voltage.

== Week 16 ==
- Day 106: The housemates paired up and designed special bouquets in line with a Valentine's Day theme for the week (with help from a professional florist). Eting underwent a challenge to uncover messages from his loved ones from four giant cellphones in two minutes. Big Brother declared the teams disbanded with the completion of the House Competitions but not before the teams split the pot money they won in the last four successful games. Carlo and Slater agreed to give part of their winnings to Biggel and Pamu on the condition that they will use it to pay for school. They were also segregated at their bedrooms by gender. Paco went to the confession room, where he was informed of his eviction and also accepted Big Brother's offer to be a House Player. His first task was to set aside Divine, Slater, and Biggel for a round-table discussion about their trip to Marinduque and Big Brother's conditions behind them because they were spotted on the streets (two weeks budget with one automatic nomination or zero budget but the four of them will not be auto-nominated). Slater agreed to be automatically nominated.
- Day 107: The next Head of Household game was held wherein the housemates had to knot a cherry stem in the fastest time. Divine was named the winner - as was Paco, who was also declared as such to help preserve his role as a House Player. Divine, since she was one of the Heads of Household, was tasked to replace a nominee. She chose to replace Deniesse with Biggel while Paco added Eting. The housemates also took care of an elderly couple - single grandmother Bella and her boyfriend Rolando - who were brought into the house. The Marinduque quartet were allowed to get their groceries for the week without the housemates knowing about its origins.
- Day 108: The housemates used their bouquet skills to make more bouquets as part of a charity fund-raising project for a local nursing home. Paco resumed his House Player duties by encouraging Pamu and Kevin, Slater and Divine, and Biggel and Tin to finally express their real feelings towards each other - especially Biggel, who has long proclaimed deeper feelings for Tin despite Tin drawing the line several weeks before. To reward the old couple with a Valentine's Day date and two electric fans, the housemates were ordered to pair up and kiss each other on the lips with a large heart-shaped clear screen separating them non-stop for 24 hours. Since no bouquets have been sold so far, the housemates produced special ads to market their "flower shop." Based on a special request from Eting about sending a bouquet to his wife, Big Brother said the pairings who sold the most of their theme bouquets will be able to send their loved ones a bouquet. Eting stayed up all night long around the Resort peddling the flowers in a video feed carried at the flower shop near the House entrance. Divine was caught by surprise when a bouquet came in from the outside world had her girlfriend's handwriting on it.
- Day 109: In the early morning hours, Biggel mustered his confidence for a serious conversation with Tin, who reiterated that their friendship cannot go to the next level. Slater also won a KFC challenge against Kevin to make improvised gifts for Tin, who had a dream date with the winner. The heart screen was reduced to two smaller linked hearts. With Paco's interpretation, Seichang remarked that Bella looked very much like his own grandmother, leading to a serious conversation about their life stories. Tin and Carlo, who were assigned to make "I Love You" theme bouquets, won a chance to make a bouquet for their loved ones after selling 12. As a final part of the kissing task, the housemates individually kissed Cupid (played by character actor Kuhol) behind a large heart screen. Bella and Rolando's special Valentine's date was cancelled because she felt ill, but the room that was already spruced up for the date would be used by Kevin and Pamu.
- Day 110: The housemates organized a special ceremony for the old couple before they left. Divine was able to talk with her girlfriend for a duration determined by three housemates posing as "batteries." The housemates also cleaned up for a visit by actress Judy Ann Santos, who went to the house for a special feature on a supposed lifestyle show (including interviews with the housemates). Because they have been sleeping, Eting, Deniesse, Pamu, and Seichang were made to carry each other and "fly" whenever the Superman theme song is played. Big Brother asked Pamu to deeply think about her feelings and her boyfriend.
- Day 111: The female housemates shot a special TV commercial for a biscuit brand, with their male partners "turning" into John Lloyd Cruz, who visited the house. Paco resumed his role as a House Player by doing two tasks out of five submitted by the public - to court Deniesse and to act as a gay man who likes one of the male housemates. He admitted his supposed homosexuality to Tin.
- Day 112: Divine informed Slater, Biggel, and Seichang of their nominations and knew for the first time about Eting's nomination. All four were tasked about what they want to do if they had one more day left in the house. Slater cooked for the housemates, Eting built a custom ukulele, Seichang gave away some of his items, and Biggel had an ice-cream date with Tin. Paco made his move on Deniesse, resulting in a serious conversation even as Deniesse suspected that it was another task.

== Week 17 ==
- Day 113: The next Head of Household game was held - Paco was supposed to be the last to play but eventually sat it out as he was ready to go. Divine won with a time of 11 minutes and 11 seconds. She later informed the housemates of a new nomination system. Paco was able to watch who nominated for him and would be tasked to test the nominees' patience all week long. Amidst speculation about the live eviction, Slater, Paco, Divine and Biggel were ordered to start planning their grocery shopping for the week. The eviction broadcast kicked in as the planning went underway. The four nominees were sent to the confession room to be informed of the results. Eting was allowed back inside the house for a 100-second farewell. Paco broke down because of his role in Eting's exit.
- Day 114: Double-Up winner Melisa Cantiveros re-entered the House, with season runner-up Jason Francisco following in a few hours later bringing in the housemates' groceries. They later took in Pamu and Kevin or a new challenge to draft new house rules which they would accomplish in two hours - but not make anything related to nominations and lapel mic use. The girls went to the confession room first to introduce their rules - the first of which was to make the boys hold hands while holding a dumbbell in the free hand. Big Brother gave the girls two points because the female housemates let go of their hands while being out of their sight. The male housemates' first rule was to make the girls act like certain animals at the sound of a clap, earning them four points. For a special bedtime rule, the girls were tied up together at their pants' belt rungs while the male housemates had to strip down to their underwear and sleep in just one bed.
- Day 115: The male housemates were made to belly dance non-stop for two hours upon the girls' signal and wearing costumes. Divine was offered a chance to use her HOH power to save Deniesse from nomination by convincing her and another housemate with no tattoos to have one. She practiced on a slab of skinned pig meat, but declined the task and lost her privilege as well. The male housemates' second rule for the female housemates was to be tied at the ankles, put hands behind their head, and to lock their elbows while walking along the house walls wearing bikinis and say "I love you" in front of a placard stating their task- all in a two-minute run. The ankle ties taken off after an hour. As a House Player, Paco took advantage of the situation by verbally motivating Deniesse and Tin, who indeed lost her cool. The male housemates' last rule was for each female housemate to balance a calamansi on spoons using a mouth and will have to kiss a guy for ten seconds if they lost balance to earn one point. They would also kiss for ten seconds any girl they encounter.
- Day 116: In response for what happened the night before, the women made the men tie themselves to each other and move in a train around the house jumping with their arms raised and on one foot, with corresponding points. Melisa and Deniesse noted that they are concentrating their frustrations on Paco, whose apologies over the events of the previous night went unheeded. The women gradually adjusted the challenge, where Tin used the opportunity to strictly monitor them. Noting that Melisa and Jason have not been warm towards each other since they entered the House, Big Brother showed Deniesse and Slater footage of Jason talking to Big Brother about how their tension started. Big Brother also admonished the women for the recent challenge being geared on punishments. As a special rule, the housemates paired up to hold hands with each other. Jason and Melisa used the moment to talk about the real status of their relationship while Paco explained the rationale for his actions to Seichang. Big Brother tallied the scores of the housemates and judged the women as the winner.
- Day 117: Slater, Divine, Biggel, and Tin underwent a reward challenge to assemble a chain of large balls in only three minutes. The women were rewarded with a special foam party for winning the rules task, with Kevin and Carlo to accompany them. Jason and Melisa left the house a few minutes later while the rest of the housemates frolicked in the party.
- Day 118: Kevin and Pamu were questioned by Big Brother and Paco about their true feelings for each other. Kevin faced Pamu's boyfriend in a basketball game so the visitor could have a chance to talk with her. Pamu was made to watch the two men square off, but skipped the second half. Even if the boyfriend won on a 23–14 score, Kevin acknowledged their relationship to him. Pamu and her boyfriend were able to have a serious conversation after she was advised of distancing from Kevin if she avoided the talk. The two eventually break up. Meanwhile, the show stopped the voting for the current eviction round while the public were asked to vote on Paco's fate as a House Player. The results denoted that Paco should stay.
- Day 119: The housemates watched footage from all of the show's previous season finales, forcing them to think who among them deserved to prevail in the end. Big Brother brought in a special throne reserved for the Big Winner, but only Paco sat on the throne while everybody else hesitated. Deniesse and Slater were told that sitting on the throne was their weekly task, leading Big Brother to admonish them for not having enough willpower to see the season through. Since Paco sat on the throne, he was declared Head of Household by wearing a special king's crown. He was accorded special authority to command his "subjects" (the housemates) and also won rewards such as a steak dinner and foot massage at the confession room.

== Week 18 ==
- Day 120: Paco was informed by Big Brother that a group of House Players, named the M6, will be entering on Day 121 along with a fake power shortage, which Big Brother explained to test the housemates when left unsupervised. He would also oppose their decisions at every turn. Deniesse was meted a forced eviction for whispering to Divine and talking to Melisa about the public perception of her on Day 115. Big Brother informed the housemates about her fate after she left. Carlo, who was with Deniesse at the confession room at the time of the announcement, kept quiet. A box of secret items was also put in the living room, with each housemate ordered to keep watch on it as an hourglass kept track of time.
- Day 121: The M6 - current season evictees Kigoy and Luz, Baron Geisler (Celebrity Edition 2), Beauty Gonzales (Teen Edition Plus), Rica Paras (Double-Up), and Franzen Fajardo (season 1) - were given their marching orders from Big Brother and entered the House via the Resort. However, the Resort doors were chained up to prevent the M6 from entering and would only be unlocked at Big Brother's signal. As power is cut at the Luxury House all afternoon, the housemates bicker among themselves - especially when Paco theorized that the new arrivals aim to bring out their true selves and tried to convince them to open the door. Because of a heated argument with Biggel, Slater, Carlo and Divine, he somehow slips through the door to smoke cigarettes with the M6. They threaten to throw the housemates' hung clothes into the pool unless they are let in and were even sent food by Big Brother (despite the housemates giving what they could after another tense stand-off). Paco partook of the M6's feast to share intelligence information about the housemates, some of whom speculated about his eviction. The door was finally opened at nightfall, but not before the housemates talked about where the box should be hidden - part of a new weekly task (see below). Big Brother later told Slater and Paco that Luz or Kigoy would automatically qualify for the Big Four if the M6 found the box, which the housemates transferred hiding places all night. It also contained a smaller box showing pictures of the week's nominees.
- Day 122: The housemates were made to count the leaves of a small tree brought inside the house with only 1% margin of error, but the M6 struck with their distraction, allowing Beauty and Baron to get some leafy twigs. They also tried en masse to find the box when an opportunity presented itself. A second attempt where the M6 men doused themselves in soy sauce and vinegar to ward off the housemates was also beaten back. Big Brother reprimanded Kigoy for ribbing Pamu about Kevin, telling him that disrespecting the housemates was not part of the M6 assignment.
- Day 123: The housemates were assigned to count the fish in a large aquarium, but the M6 supposedly found ways to get some fish, messing up the housemates' count. The M6 also took the opportunity to discreetly get some of the food. Distraught by the tension upon the M6's report, Big Brother declared a temporary ceasefire, allowing everybody to spend some time together.
- Day 124: The ceasefire allowed both groups to plan their next moves, with Franzen deciding to probe the former Wayuk bedroom to find the box. Big Brother gave the housemates five hours to count the leaves and the fish. After getting the fish count correct (155), they were given another chance to make the right count for the leaves. During a light moment at the male housemates' bedroom, Kigoy was caught snooping around trying to find the box while the ceasefire was in effect but he later got into a short argument with Kevin that resulted in his forced eviction because he threatened him. The ceasefire ended at night and the housemates were given 24 hours to guard their box. The M6 on the other hand, tried to goad the housemates into committing violations of the rule book (such as making off-handed comments about events in the outside world before the M6 entered the house). Baron warned Seichang against provocations after he misinterpreted a gesture by Beauty as an attempt to get the box. Luz got to talk with her former housemates but the conversation got emotionally charged when she brought up the issue about how they treated her as a housemate - especially Divine's comments on her. The now-M5 were assigned to guard a balloon that had a piece of paper where the actual leaf count - 3,943 - was written, with a second balloon as decoy. The housemates were ordered to constantly move the box every two hours. Slater slipped through the cordon and stole the real balloon before bursting it. Tin recovered the paper but not before Beauty hurt her hand in the incident. The housemates' indifference to her injury would cause her to go into a tirade about their behavior, particularly when they did not allow her to go to the comfort room to urinate during the afternoon of Day 121.
- Day 125: Big Brother cut down the duration for keeping the box in one place to only one hour. At daybreak, Seichang even caught Franzen trying to crawl under some of the dining room chairs to get the box. With a little covert help from Paco in the final few minutes, the M5 played a special audiotape message from Eting, who said that the box had a cash prize for him and the M5 wanted to get it for him. After a long discussion, Baron successfully convinced the housemates to surrender the box, which made Pamu cry because she did not vote to give it up for Eting. Baron later admitted that everything was a set-up, causing the housemates to verbally express their frustrations about Eting's plight being subverted with ulterior motives.
- Day 126: Each housemate individually went before the M5 for questioning about their viability to finish the season on top. The questioning led the M5 to formally decide on one automatic nominee.

== Week 19 ==
- Day 127: The hosts confirmed that the season will end on Day 155 (March 31, 2012). The housemates personally made their nominations on each other by stepping on a circle that had their faces printed on. However, Big Brother revealed that the up-front nomination was just to vote who doesn't deserve to be in the Big Four. One of Tin's dogs was sent back inside the House. Big Brother gave the housemates a long sermon on how people can be tricked because of compassion. He also announced that he will be leaving the house to another person before thanking the M5 for their assistance. The housemates finally opened the secret box to find the nominees' pictures.
- Day 128: Kevin and Biggel were distraught because they earned five votes each and got a chance to talk with the other housemates about what happened. Big Utol was revealed to be the substitute for Big Brother. Baron and Beauty came back into the House as a hacienda-owning couple and had the housemates as their servants at the Activity Area, which was remodeled as a plantation. Although Seichang was evicted the night before, he transferred to another room and reemerged as Baron and Beauty's right-hand man, who will keep watch over the servants. The housemates were made to cook their masters' food by gathering whatever is available and start assembling a new thatched hut strong enough to withstand the elements. Tin and Pamu went squeamish about killing a live chicken for the masters' dinner (chicken adobo). Biggel also used his knowledge of farming to help the housemates.
- Day 129: Big Utol treated the housemates to a drink after a long day of assembling the hut's roof. Slater was assigned to lead the housemates in finishing their weekly task, the prize of which include full academic scholarships for Pamu and Biggel.
- Day 130: Slater and Carlo left the house in the early hours and headed to Pampanga to actually work in a rice paddy with help from a real farmer. Baron also came to supervise them. Back at the house, Kevin was assigned to lead the housemates in capturing frogs for their food. They were later tasked their masters to debone bangus correctly with Beauty testing their patience. Beauty, who left because she did not like the food they cooked, came back to the hacienda to find the housemates napping. Baron took pleasure in tearing down the shack.
- Day 131: Kevin and Biggel went to the same rice paddy, with Beauty continually ordering them around. Pamu was given the whole day to refill the Resort pool using only water from a well in the Hacienda. Paco secretly ate some grapes reserved for the masters. The rest of the housemates rebuilt the shack as Baron suspected one of them may be smoking cigarettes. Because they have been talking about various Filipino delicacies, Big Utol decided to treat them to only images of such food, including crushed ice shake and biko rice cakes. They later played a special game of bingo, with the losers' faces rubbed on coal. Tin and Divine were brought back to the Luxury House to do some house chores with express orders from Baron not to touch the food on the table, but Paco secretly stole some of it, leading him to have a slightly physical altercation with Seichang, who was trying to reel him in. Paco eventually relented and brought the stolen food back. At night, the housemates had a verbal showdown with Beauty and Baron, who evidently lost his patience because Pamu was not finished with her task. After the confrontation, Biggel finally took up Tin's dare to strip to his underwear and roll in the mud in exchange for a kiss from her.
- Day 132: The housemates had live crickets for breakfast. Paco was temporarily summoned by Baron and Beauty to clean the toilets with his hand - which was a cover for them to plan their next action. Slater was also assigned to do more chores in the Luxury House all day. The masters brought in a large container full of potatoes and requested that the housemates peel everything all night and make French fries for breakfast. Pamu was also ordered to mash rice husks in a mortar and pestle for failing the pool task with Biggel substituting for her. However, their continued haranguing of the housemates prompts Kevin and Pamu to finally stand up against them, with the two of them formally declaring that they will never work again if the masters did not stop raising their voices. As a result, the weekly task was ruled a failure.
- Day 133: Biggel and Pamu were assigned to plant two magic beans in a small plot of land at the Resort where the housemates would water using a special "magic potion" and "magic fertilizer" created from various body excretions (such as tears and sweat) and to do prayer rites for the beans to "grow" into a tree (in the manner of Jack and the Beanstalk) called "Treenity." They later made wishes before the tree. Biggel and Tin cooked maja blanca for Divine (who doubted that she would not have a birthday inside the house). The housemates were tasked to secretly start planning for Divine's birthday party. Before leaving the House, Baron and Beauty had a serious talk with the housemates about the whole task before preparing a feast of their own. Baron would later comment to Big Utol that he would not have endured the task for long if he joined the current season. The housemates passed the time by doing dares - one of which was for Carlo to have half his mustache shaved off.

== Week 20 ==
- Day 134: In a reward challenge, the housemates played speed Scrabble and the winners were massaged by the losers. With Big Utol's blessing, Paco confessed to Seichang his actual role in the house. The nominees of the week were informed of their status during the eviction broadcast, where Big Brother also announced his return. Kevin and Seichang's departure weighed hard on Paco and Pamu, who are left with the realization of being the only remaining original Team Wayuk members left in the House. Based on earlier interviews with Big Utol, Pamu, Tin, and Biggel were ordered to remain in the Hacienda while the others returned to the Luxury House. The decision excited Biggel; he stated that the Hacienda felt like coming back home to Marinduque and he will have more time with Tin.
- Day 135: Under the cover of a forced eviction, Big Brother removed a cattle named "Tisoy" from the Hacienda, and the Luxury House residents were temporarily made to believe that Tin was force-evicted for health reasons. A goat and chicken were later put in Tisoy's place. Big Brother's Fairy Godmothers made their presence felt before the housemates by lending their voices to certain objects and making them do various tasks - Bea Saw as one of the Luxury House dog statues, Nene Tamayo as the water at the Resort fountain, and Keanna Reeves as the chicken in the Hacienda. The trio later personally introduced themselves to the housemates and later gave them the first part of their weekly task: to quickly pull the sheet from a dinner table without dislodging everything on top (a holdover from Celebrity Edition II).
- Day 136: At the Hacienda, Tin and Pamu were ordered to speak to Biggel at the same time. He later donned a superhero costume as "Captain Biggel" (as part of a reward task to get new sets of underwear). The two women were also treated to a Ventosa massage and marinated inasal chicken. The housemates started practicing the table task individually, with Slater, Biggel and Pamu made to sun dance for dislodging many items off the table. One of Tin's "wishes" became true as all of her dogs were sent inside the Hacienda, while Pamu was able to eat carinderia food along with her sister.
- Day 137: All of the housemates got to meet Tin's dogs after Tin, Biggel, and Pamu were caught giving them a bath in the Resort (a task so the three of them could have a hot shower in the Luxury House). They also held a mock nomination for the canines, five of which left within a few hours. The housemates made their final rehearsals for the table task before suiting up as waiters and waitresses for the real thing. They successfully slid the cloth five times. In the second challenge of the weekly task, the housemates were given three hours to slip past three holes in the center of spiderwebs rigged with alarm bells without touching them (originally made in Season 1). They completed the challenge in roughly an hour after several attempts. Paco was allowed to have Bea as someone to talk to after he expressed to Big Brother his feelings about Kevin and Seichang's evictions and how they affected his communication with the other housemates (given their team affiliations). He was allowed to inform all housemates to look after Bea, who was already pregnant. The Fairy Godmothers were also made to stay in the House, where they took note of various issues.
- Day 138: For successfully completing the tablecloth challenge, the housemates ate their requested food on a large tablecloth with Slater, Biggel, Carlo, and Pamu holding the corners. Because the housemates failed with the Hacienda weekly task - which would have resulted in full scholarships for Pamu and Biggel - the two were assigned the last part of the current weekly task: they would try slipping past an array of bell-linked garters without tripping the alarm (a holdover from Season II) carrying a school bag. The other housemates were ordered not to sit down and sleep all night long.
- Day 139: Noticing the stress, Big Brother challenged the housemates to sit on each other's knees for ten minutes to finally have a chance to sit down. Pamu and Biggel finally solved the challenge at 4:47am. As they returned to the Hacienda, the two talk about returning the money that Carlo and Slater pledged for their education several weeks before and later talked about the issue with Keanna.
- Day 140: Pamu and Biggel gave back Carlo and Slater's money while the rest of Tin's dogs were removed from the House. Before leaving the House, the Fairy Godmothers granted the housemates' remaining wishes, which included Divine reuniting with her girlfriend for one hour (but only talk to for 100 seconds). They also made their own wishes for the housemates, such as Biggel shunning his habit of using his poor man's life story for mileage.

== Week 21 ==
- Day 141: The Hacienda was put into temporary "lockdown" after the housemates noticed the chicken feeling ill, prompting Big Brother to state that it is showing signs of bird flu. Biggel volunteered to bring the chicken to the confession room and be later decontaminated. The housemates underwent several reward challenges, one of which was finding and - for the female housemates - modelling clothes matching those that Lindsay Lohan wore in a new commercial for a clothing brand. Slater was given 24 hours to quiz Tin about one of Paco's secrets (his supposed homosexuality), which would lead to a bigger secret - his House Player role. Paco was finally reconfirmed as an official housemate after a public survey figured mostly in his favor, but he himself did not know about his new status. After Carlo left, the housemates transferred to the Hacienda, where Divine taught Paco how to make rolled tobacco.
- Day 142: The housemates were given their weekly task (after Pamu and Tin were told about it two days before). Paco and Divine ran a cooking show as one of the performances. A drinking game involving pingpong balls being tossed on glasses with ice tea had the loser suffering one of many consequences (such as Pamu holding a live cockroach - her worst fear - for ten minutes). Two masked men with nets came to the Resort to catch housemates who performed the worst in a talent portion and tossed them into the pool. Since Slater failed to crack the secrecy behind Paco's House Player role, Big Brother finally told him everything and challenged him to turn the tables around on Paco, starting with a dance routine between the two of them.
- Day 143: The housemates pushed ahead with the variety show via an improv stand-up comedy routine. A darts challenge had the loser being hit with a soft-boiled egg while a cosplay fashion show later turned into a talk show. Tin suffered the embarrassment of Biggel kissing her on the lips. The masked men came back with creampies during a water-drinking game with the clock running less than 18 hours to go. Biggel was also made to be decked in blue body paint (in the matter of Avatar's Na'vi) while others tried making an ice sculpture.
- Day 144: In the early morning hours, Slater tested Paco's supposed homosexuality by admitting their "mutual affection." Pamu led the housemates in their performances, with only a few hours to go and being almost out of ideas. Pamu and Tin tried impersonating their ex-housemates. Paco spent over 90 minutes teaching Divine how to do the show's signature dance, then upped it to a more flowing dance in the last few minutes before the task was finally declared a success. With the completion of the task, the housemates were allowed to finally rest. Paco lamented about the end of his House Player role (and subsequent exit) with Big Brother and expressed intentions to reconcile with everybody before he left the House by cooking braised beef for them. After the meal and also after having serious talks with all of the housemates, Paco was joined at the confession room by Slater, who told him that he knew about his House Player role. Big Brother informed Paco that he was officially a housemate again. Meanwhile, Biggel distanced himself from everybody else for the rest of the day - even using a nearby bamboo couch as his bed - because he could not stomach Pamu and Tin's teasing, which was mostly over him picking his nose many times and his feelings for Tin.
- Day 145: Biggel still kept himself away from the housemates. Slater taught the housemates how to shoot firearms using air pistols given his experience in practical shooting while Tin used her tennis skills in teaching them the game. A serve by Paco ended up hitting Tin in the head. They also paired off in a match to count the most number of rallies after three rounds - where Tin and Biggel won a special mattress to sleep on.
- Day 146: Big Brother and the housemates reprimanded Biggel over picking his nose, resulting in him being given a set of long fingernails for one hand and a hook on the other to test his handling of food. The tennis training the day before turned out to be part of a new challenge issued at 4pm: to make a continuous set of 6,000 rallies for 12 hours, with a housemate getting a reward for every 1,000 straight rallies - but the count will have to be done all over again if a rally missed.
- Day 147: Because the housemates have not been making headway with the tennis challenge with only four hours to go, Tin, Slater, Divine, and Paco were chosen to carry on before 1am, but the original 1,000 rallies-per-reward goal was limited to 500 instead. They logged a cumulative total of at least 1,500 rallies before Big Brother put Tin in a handicap match against the best and worst players (Slater and Pamu) to gather 572 extra rallies. The total was enough to land rewards for four housemates with Tin in particular receiving a 100-second reunion with her sister plus one of their homemade videos shown at the Hacienda. Because of the searing heat recorded that day, the housemates underwent a three-hour challenge to put yellow and blue balls atop colored bottles laid down on a diagram of the Big Brother House facade. Success in the challenge resulted in the housemates finally returning to the Luxury House. Everybody eventually underwent various grooming treatments after their return.

== Week 22 ==
- Day 148: During the eviction broadcast, Pamu, Tin, and Divine watched the assessment of reading experts who quizzed them several weeks before about their apparent dyslexia, the symptoms of which showed in reading the challenge assignment letters. Pamu also received her academic scholarship from a local computer school. Biggel was visibly distraught after Tin left.
- Day 149: In the early hours, Big Brother ordered the remaining housemates to make their ideal Big Four list (from first to fourth place) for the upcoming Big Night using a podium in the living room. Divine chose Pamu, Paco, Slater, and herself; Biggel selected Pamu, Slater, Divine, and himself; Pamu picked herself, Paco, Divine, and Slater; Slater chose himself, Pamu, Paco, and Divine, and Paco picked himself, Pamu, Divine, and Slater. Since Biggel was not among the lineups other than his own, the selectors said he had still not grown up after a long time. Big Brother asked those who would want to give up his or her slot in the Big Four to remain in the confession room - Slater and Paco stayed. After hearing their concerns, he issued a challenge for a chance to turn the Big Four into the Big Five, called Big Shot for the Big Slot. Late in the afternoon, the housemates underwent the first part of the challenge - to hurdle a five-part wire maze to collect a theoretical total of ten bullets each. The other housemates would know the person slipped up by a small electrical charge passed through electrodes connected to their butts. The varying degrees of success resulted in the housemates earning 18 bullets, which are actually airsoft pistol pellets. They started practicing.
- Day 150: Divine had her 100-second reunion with her sister. The housemates found a group of five colored circular platforms in the living room and suspected it as being part of the challenge for the Big Five. The second part of the challenge involved shooting five complicated targets at a distance of 11 meters with the pellets - in order, the plug of a five-gallon water container, an egg, a light bulb, an electric switch triggering a buzzer and a target on a pendulum. They only have ten seconds between each shot. Divine, Pamu, and Biggel - who had five pellets among them - failed to hit the water container, while Paco hit it and missed the egg. Slater's experience in practical shooting allowed him to have ten rounds, but his part of the challenge was postponed for the following night.
- Day 151: The housemates welcomed talk show host Boy Abunda for an interview segment that aimed to bring out honest answers from all of them - especially Biggel, whose life story's inconsistencies were brought up again. Slater took a few hours to practice for the Big Shot challenge. However, he only hit the egg and spent most of his ammunition trying to hit the lightbulb, even after being given five extra rounds. As a result, only four Housemates would make it to the Big Night, with the public only given until midnight to vote on their choice. Per his reward for the tennis challenge, Slater had a 100-second reunion with his father, who was brought in for moral support. He tearfully lamented to Big Brother that he let everybody down as the red-suited policeman took away one of the circles. They had a feast one more time. Biggel finally received his scholarship from the Philippine College of Criminology.
- Day 152: The Big Four was announced by having them step up on the circles. Divine's girlfriend greeted her on the way out. After Divine left, the quartet were given one last challenge - to safeguard 50 balls each while only remaining atop the platforms for 24 hours. The balls, which they picked up all over the Resort, would represent PHP50,000 (PHP1,000 a ball) for a chosen charity. Each of the quartet went to the confession room, where they called a loved one to express apologies. Paco called up his ex-girlfriend, Slater got in touch with his mother (who reportedly opposed him joining the show), while Biggel's father hung up on him as soon as he identified himself as the caller. Since Pamu could not reach her mother, Big Brother asked her to make a special message she would have said if they indeed talked.
- Day 153: The housemates were forced to give up five balls total after Big Brother saw Biggel's foot touching the floor and one ball also fell. They were also ordered to remain standing because they have been sitting atop the platform. They later headed to the Resort, where a group of masked men started throwing water balloons at them from varying distances for several hours and also tried to grab the balls. As the masked men left, Big Brother took away one of the platforms. With only a couple of hours to spare, Eting, Carlo, Divine, and Tin momentarily reappeared to try throwing the lost balls back to the Big Four, who eventually picked up four of the five balls. Wendy, Deniesse, Seichang, Kevin, and Ryan also returned to provide them with food. The Big Four completed the challenge as they were forced to remain on one platform during the final 30 minutes.
- Day 154: With the success of the last challenge, the Big Four got their PHP50,000 checks for their chosen charities. The housemates were also ordered to pack up their belongings.

== Week 23 ==
- Day 155: The Big Four were transported to the finale show at the Quirino Grandstand aboard a truck wearing Filipiniana clothing. Big Brother gave his congratulatory message to the Big Four, who answered select questions from the public. Biggel and Pamu also found out for the very first time about Paco's House Player role.
