= Nene Tamayo =

Filipina reality television personality

- Born: Jennivev Santillan Tamayo; September 27, 1981 (age 45); Santa Fe, Romblon, Philippines
- Known for: Pinoy Big Brother: Season 1

Jennivev "Nene" Santillan Tamayo (born September 27, 1981) is a Filipina reality television personality known for winning the first season of Pinoy Big Brother.

== Career ==
=== Pinoy Big Brother ===
She's best known as the dancing diva and the 'astig' (tough) housemate because of her past military background as an ROTC officer in University of the East, thus Kumander Nene (Commander Nene) was her popular tagname. Nene is also known as Nenegizer (alluding to Energizer batteries) because of her strong and long-lasting stamina; this was given during the dance marathon challenge of the housemates.

On December 10, 2005, Tamayo, with the most number of text votes, won the show, after spending 111 days inside the Big Brother house.

=== Post-Pinoy Big Brother ===
Nene is having second thoughts on building a career in show business, but she said if she would be given an opportunity, she wants to become a newscaster and be part of ABS-CBN's news program, TV Patrol World and indeed became the host of its segment Citizen Patrol. She is set to be awarded by the ABS-CBN's show Pipol with the "2005 Pipol of the Year" award after defeating the co-nominee Manny Pacquiao under the "Sports and Entertainment" Category.

In 2006, she became a finalist of the ABS-CBN dance show U Can Dance. Tamayo is currently a member of ABS CBN's circle of homegrown talents named Star Magic. She also appears as a regular in UNTV 37's morning program Pilipinas, Gising Ka Na Ba?

Preceded by First	Pinoy Big Brother; Big Winner; 2005	Succeeded by Keanna Reeves (Cebu)
Preceded by First	Pinoy Big Brother Regular Season; Big Winner; 2005	Succeeded by Beatriz Saw
