= Pinoy Big Brother: Season 1 =

Season of television series

Pinoy Big Brother
- Season 1
- Presented by: Toni Gonzaga; Willie Revillame; Mariel Rodriguez
- No. of days: 112
- No. of housemates: 13
- Winner: Nene Tamayo
- Runner-up: Jason Gainza

Release
- Original network: ABS-CBN
- Original release: August 21 – December 10, 2005

Season chronology
- Next → Season 2

The first season of the reality game show Pinoy Big Brother premiered on the ABS-CBN network on August 21, 2005 and ran for 112 days until December 10, 2005.

Nene Tamayo was named the show's first ever Big Winner over Jayson Gainza and two other finalists, Cassandra Ponti and Uma Khouny.

== Development ==
At the time of the launch of the franchise, the local version was the 31st version being broadcast among all the Big Brother franchises in the world. It was the second in Asia after Thailand.

=== Auditions ===
The show's producers stated that the housemates were chosen from 25,000 people who auditioned in Metro Manila, Cebu, and Davao. However, there were allegations that some of them did not audition at all and were chosen by network management.

=== Prizes ===
The winner of this season took home the grand prize worth ₱6,000,000 (approx. $111,000) all-in-all, including the ₱1,000,000 cash prize (about $18,000), a house and lot, a Nissan Frontier, an entertainment component system, a Yamaha motorcycle, and a livelihood showcase.

== Overview ==
=== The House ===
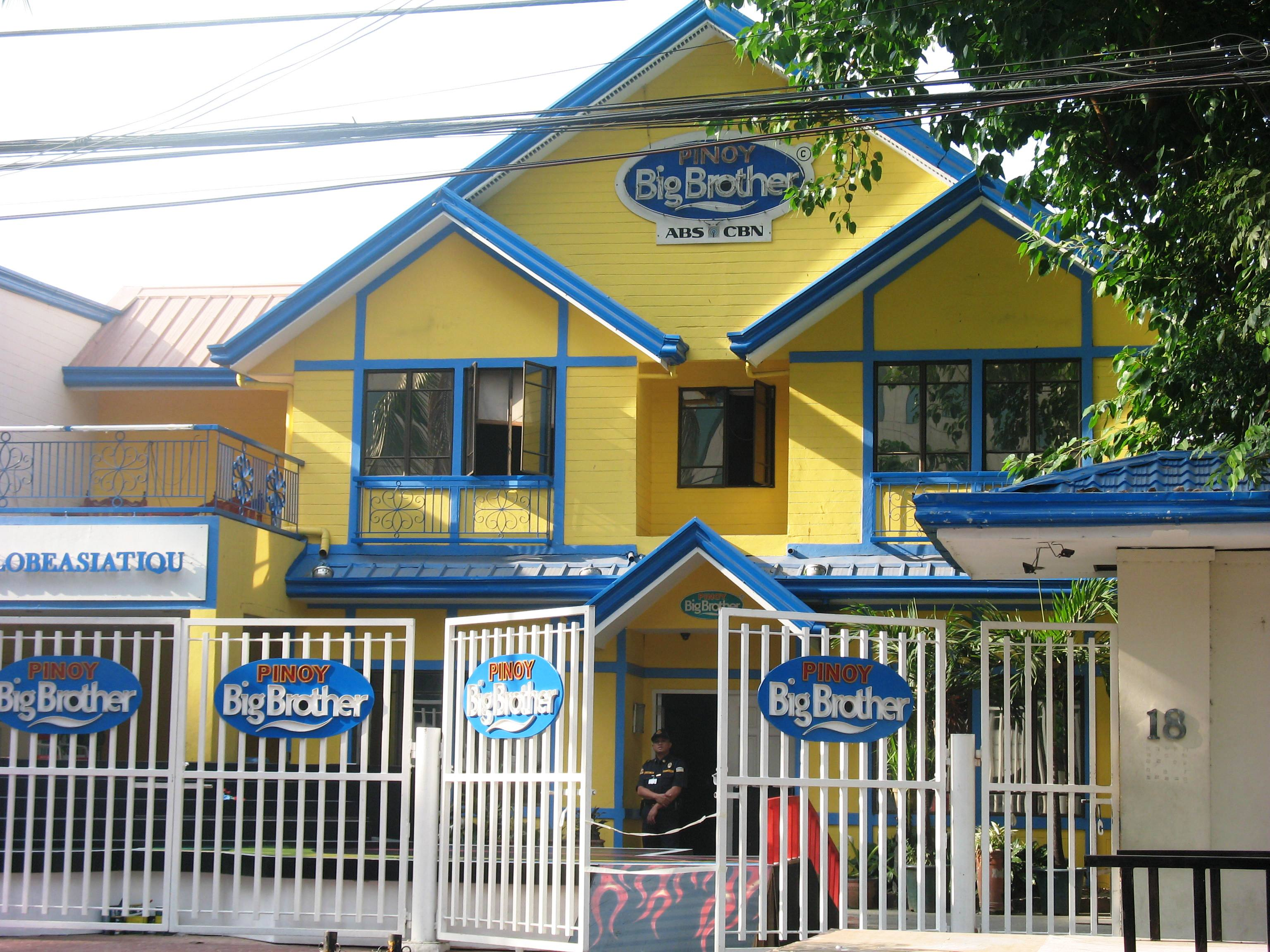
The Pinoy Big Brother House in 2005.

The house is located in front of the ABS-CBN studios in Quezon City.

A car is used to transfer the evicted housemate from the Big Brother house to the ABS-CBN main building.

The Big Brother House is a multi-room studio designed with walls painted with pastel colors. For the housemates security and the essence of being locked away from the outside world, the garden area is covered with a camouflage-type of fabric. It also boasts of a multi-faith altar in one wall of the house (one which has a Bible, a Koran, and twelve rosaries), making the house the only Big Brother house that has a room set aside for religious purposes (although it is said that the Arab Big Brother house had prayer rooms). And although any form of communication from the outside world is banned inside the house, there is a large flat-screen television set in the living room, used for only two purposes:

- Airing videos Big Brother want to show to any or all housemates, especially that of the TV Mass every Sunday, and
- To announce the names of nominees for eviction directly to the housemates and the person evicted from the house.

To complete the set up, 26 surveillance cameras are positioned all over the house to watch the housemates' every move, including the bathroom. For modesty's sake, however, images from the bathroom will be shown if the bathroom is used for any purpose other than bathing (such as gossiping).

== Housemates ==
The show's 12 housemates all entered during a live premiere on August 21, 2005. They were introduced in a special segment during which hosts Toni Gonzaga and Mariel Rodriguez visited their houses and asked the housemates (whose faces were pixelized) to pack up their gear, giving them a special key to signify their entry in the House.

The ages stated below are their ages at time of entry inside the Big Brother House. Origin indicates where the housemates were born or based before joining the program. Thus, August 21, 2005, is stated as Day 1.

List of Pinoy Big Brother: Season 1 Housemates
Name	Age on entry	Hometown	Entered	Exited	Result
Nene Tamayo	23	Romblon	Day 1	Day 112	Winner
Jayson Gainza	25	Batangas City	Day 1	Day 112	Runner-up
Cass Ponti	27	Davao City	Day 1	Day 112	3rd Place
Uma Khouny	23	Israel	Day 1	Day 112	4th Place
Say Alonzo	22	San Juan, Metro Manila	Day 1	Day 105	Evicted
Franzen Fajardo	23	Sampaloc	Day 1	Day 91	Forcibly evicted
Jenny Suico	29	Olongapo	Day 56	Day 84	Evicted
Jenny Suico	29	Olongapo	Day 1	Day 28	Voluntary Exit
Sam Milby	21	Troy, Ohio, U.S.	Day 28	Day 77	Evicted
Chx Alcala	24	Caloocan	Day 1	Day 63	Evicted
Bob dela Cruz	28	Marilao	Day 1	Day 51	Forcibly evicted
Racquel Reyes	31	Tanauan City	Day 1	Day 49	Evicted
JB Magsaysay	25	La Union	Day 1	Day 35	Evicted
Rico Barrera	20	Olongapo	Day 1	Day 21	Evicted

== Nomination history ==
Pinoy Big Brother: Season 1 nomination history
	#1	#2	#3	#4	#5	#6	#7	#8	#9	Big Night	Nominations received
Eviction day and date	Day 21 September 10	Day 35 September 24	Day 49 October 8	Day 56 October 15	Day 63 October 22	Day 77 November 5	Day 84 Nov. 12	Day 91 November 19	Day 105 December 3	Day 112 December 10	Nominations received
Nomination day and date	Day 14; September 4	Day 28; September 17	Day 42; October 1	Day 50; October 9	Day 57; October 16	Day 70; October 29	Day 80; November 8	Day 85; November 13	Day 98; November 26	Day 105; December 3	Nominations received
Nene	Cass; Say	Cass; JB	Say; Cass	No nominations	Uma; Cass	Say; Sam	Cass; Uma	No nominations	Uma; Say	Winner	15
Jason	Nene; Bob	JB; Nene	Uma; Cass	No nominations	Sam; Uma	Sam; Uma	Cass; Say	No nominations	Say; Cass	Runner-up	18
Cass	Franzen; Racquel	Racquel; Bob	Racquel; Jason	No nominations	Jason; Nene	Nene; Jason	Jenny; Jason	No nominations	Nene; Jason	3rd Place	35
Uma	Racquel; Bob	Racquel; Bob	Racquel; Bob	No nominations	Nene; Jason	Franzen; Nene	Jason; Nene	No nominations	Nene; Jason	4th Place	21
Say	Racquel; Bob	Racquel; Jason	Bob; Racquel	No nominations	Jason; Cass	Jason; Jenny	Cass; Jenny	No nominations	Cass; Jason	Evicted (Day 105)	14
Franzen	Racquel; Uma	JB; Uma	Cass; Uma	No nominations	Sam; Cass	Sam; Cass	Cass; Uma	No nominations	Forced Eviction (Day 91)		14 (+2)
Jenny	Franzen; Racquel	Franzen; Racquel	Voluntarily Exited (Day 28)		Exempt	Sam; Franzen	Say; Cass	Evicted (Day 84)			4
Sam	Not in the House		Racquel; Bob	No nominations	Chx; Say	Jason; Say	Evicted (Day 77)				12
Chx	Franzen; JB	Cass; Franzen	Cass; Franzen	No nominations	Cass; Sam	Evicted (Day 63)					2 (+1)
Bob	Uma; Cass	Uma; JB	Uma; Cass	Forced Eviction (Day 50)							12
Racquel	Uma; Franzen	JB; Cass	Cass; Say	Evicted (Day 49)							27
JB	Bob; Racquel	Racquel; Bob	Evicted (Day 35)								10
Rico	Racquel; Nene	Evicted (Day 21)									0 (+1)
Notes	^{See Note 1}	^{See Note 2}	^{None}	^{See Note 3}	^{See Note 4}	^{None}	^{See Note 5}	^{See Note 6}	^{None}	^{See Note 7}	
Up for eviction	Franzen; Racquel; Rico	JB; Racquel	Cass; Racquel	Jenny; JB; Racquel; Rico	Cass; Chx; Franzen; Jason; Sam	Jason; Sam	Cass; Franzen; Jason; Jenny; Say	Cass; Franzen	Cass; Jason; Nene; Say	Open Voting	
Saved from eviction	Franzen; 79.00% Racquel; 11.00%	Racquel; 66.30%	Cass; 53.00%	Jenny; 42.00%	Franzen; 36.00% Cass; 21.00% Jason; 20.00% Sam; 17.00%	Jason; 53.80%	Franzen; 37.90% Cass; 26.70% Jason; 20.80% Say; 10.60%	Cass; Saved by default	Nene; 44.20% Cass; 24.80% Jason; 24.10%	Nene; 48.90%	
Evicted	Rico; 10.00%	JB; 33.70%	Racquel; 47.00%	Rico; 25.00% JB; 21.00% Racquel; 12.00%	Chx; 6.00%	Sam; 46.20%	Jenny; 4.00%	Eviction Cancelled	Say; 6.90%	Jason; 27.50% Cass; 18.90% Uma; 4.70%	
Forced eviction	none		Bob	none				Franzen	none	Jason; 27.50% Cass; 18.90% Uma; 4.70%	
Voluntary exit		Jenny	none							Jason; 27.50% Cass; 18.90% Uma; 4.70%	

Legend
Housemate was given an automatic nomination as a result of a violation or a twist.
Notes

1. Big Brother decided to automatically nominate Rico for eviction after the latter showed unpleasant behavior inside his house.
2. Jenny opted to voluntarily leave the house due to her foster father's deteriorating health. Voting was not affected, however. Sam was her replacement housemate.
3. Bob was forcibly evicted from the house due to his health condition. The previous four housemates who have left the house were put-up for votation by the public to be Bob's replacement housemate.
4. As a newly returned housemate, Jenny was not allowed to be nominated or to nominate. Chx was automatically nominated for asking Jenny a question about the outside world - specifically the crowd who gathered to see the Big Switch twist on Day 56. Franzen was automatically nominated by Big Brother for his numerous violations of house rules and for his “disrespectful behavior” when dealing with Big Brother.
5. Franzen got his second automatic nomination from Big Brother for his rampant violation of house rules the week before including writing a secret letter to his best friend Jason who was then nominated for eviction.
6. The nominations were suspended by Big Brother on account of a grave violation having been committed by Franzen. Given the decision of Endemol, Big Brother called Cass into the confession room to let her know Franzen's. In a very emotional moment, Cassandra offered to voluntarily exit from the House to save him. Big Brother opened a new poll on whether Cass should leave. However, Franzen was forcibly evicted from the house for sharing with Jason that was supposed to be kept only to himself.
7. Open voting was announced after Say's exit for the final four housemates, dubbed the Big 4.

== The Big Night ==
After spending 112 days* inside the house, Nene Tamayo was proclaimed the first Pinoy Big Brother winner in a grand finale on December 10, 2005. The show, dubbed "The Big Night", was held at Clark Expo Amphitheater in Mabalacat, and was broadcast live.

The four remaining housemates (Cass, Nene, Jason, and Uma), wearing blindfolds and headphones, were taken to Clark Expo Amphitheater from the Big Brother house in Quezon City by a private plane. They were then sequestered in a secret location before the actual live final. What was played on their headphones is the song Pinoy Ako by Orange and Lemons. It was played repeatedly until they went out in the secret location. Despite the rains that plagued the day of the final, 30,000 people watched "The Big Night," hosted by Willie Revillame, Toni Gonzaga and Mariel Rodriguez. According to TV ratings agency AGB Philippines, the show averaged a 39% rating and peaked at a 46% rating.

After spending 112 days inside the house, Uma was declared as the Fourth Big Placer in the Big Night finale, garnering just 52,833 votes or 4.7% of the total votes. Soon after, Cass having garnered 214,188 votes, 18.9% of total votes, was awarded the Third Big Placer status in the Big Night finale. The Second Big Placer was then named to be Jason. He garnered 312,258 votes, equal to 27.5% of the total votes.

The finale show lasted almost three hours and ended with fireworks as the Pinoy Big Brother house replica disintegrated to reveal Nene Tamayo as the "Big Winner." She garnered 554,906 votes, or 48.9% of total votes, in the Big Night finale.

This table shows the summary of votes as obtained by each of the Big 4 in the Big Night.

Event	Big 4	Votes		Result
Event	Big 4	Actual Votes	Percentage	Result
Big Night	Cass	214,188	18.90%	3rd Place
Big Night	Jason	312,258	27.50%	Runner-Up
Big Night	Nene	554,906	48.90%	Winner
Big Night	Uma	52,833	4.70%	4th Place
TOTAL VOTES		1,134,185	100%	

* The hosts always stressed on air that the show lasted only 111 days. That is because their day count started on the day of the first episode's airing and not on the day the housemates entered the Big Brother House and an episode aired every night shows what happened the day before, even if there is a live broadcast. In the first two volumes of its DVD set, the day number is correctly tagged with its corresponding calendar date, but the beginning of the third volume pegs Day 92 on November 21, 2005, skipping November 20 from the day count probably to put the Big Night on "Day 111." September 25, 2005, the only day the program was not aired in the entire duration of the season, is also counted.

== Post-season specials ==
After the first season's run ended, a series of specials were aired relating to the program.

- Pinoy Big Brother Revealed

Pinoy Big Brother Revealed was a special documentary series hosted by Boy Abunda. Rather than just a behind-the-scenes look at the show, the series explores the concept, its popularity, the housemates themselves, the program's initially criticized morality, and its impact on Filipino pop culture, especially the rampant use of the show's logo, footage, and music by pirates. The first episode was shown live to accommodate the "Big Four," who were obviously inside the house during the taped interviews for the documentary.

- Pinoy Big Brother: Pamasko ni Kuya

Pamasko ni Kuya (English: Big Brother's Christmas Gift) was a series where the housemates' Christmas wishes are granted by the producers of the show, especially ones that involve charity work.

- Pinoy Big Brother Drama Specials

Pinoy Big Brother Drama Specials was a two-part mini-series showcasing the housemates' acting skills. It aired on December 26, 2005, and January 6, 2006.

- The Final Task

The first seven evicted housemates go on a trip to a deserted resort in Subic, where many surprises await them. Bob finds out from CB radio that the person who invited them, a woman known only as "Mother" (Gloria Diaz), has been abducted by pirates. They have to both escape from the resort and rescue her before the pirates arrive.

- Kay Tagal Kang Hinanap (English: Finding You for So Long)

Big Brother calls on Say and the Big Four to find Franzen in Baguio. Although there is a reward waiting for them upon their return to Manila, the six are not satisfied at this offer and demand Big Brother to reveal himself. It also features a cameo appearance by fortune teller Madam Auring.

== Official soundtrack ==
Pinoy Big Brother (Ang Soundtrack Ng Teleserye Ng Totoong Buhay)

Soundtrack album by Various artists
- Released: November 7, 2005
- Recorded: 2005
- Genres: OPM, Soundtrack
- Length: 21:23
- Languages: Filipino, English
- Label: Star Music
- Producer: ABS-CBN Film Productions, Inc.

Due to the popularity of the housemates, Star Music together with ABS-CBN created an album for Pinoy Big Brother entitled Pinoy Big Brother (Ang Soundtrack Ng Teleserye Ng Totoong Buhay) and was released on November 7, 2005. The album also includes music videos of the included soundtracks.

Pinoy Big Brother (Ang Soundtrack Ng Teleserye Ng Totoong Buhay)
No.	Title	Writer(s)	Artists	Length
1.	"Pinoy Ako Dance Version"	Clem Castro, Jonathan Manalo	PBB Housemates	3:45
2.	"Magmahal Muli"	Samuel Lloyd Milby	Sam Milby, Say Alonzo	4:09
3.	"I've Fallen in Love"	Samuel Lloyd Milby	Sam Milby	2:42
4.	"Pinoy Rap"	Clem Castro, Jonathan Manalo	Jason Gainza, Franzen Fajardo	3:07
5.	"Pinoy Ako (X-mas Remix)"	Clem Castro, Jonathan Manalo	PBB Housemates	3:48
6.	"Pinoy Ako"	Clem Castro, Jonathan Manalo	Orange and Lemons	3:50
Total length:				21:23

New television show	Pinoy Big Brother: Season 1 (August 21 – December 10, 2005)	Succeeded by Celebrity Edition 1
