= KC Concepcion discography =

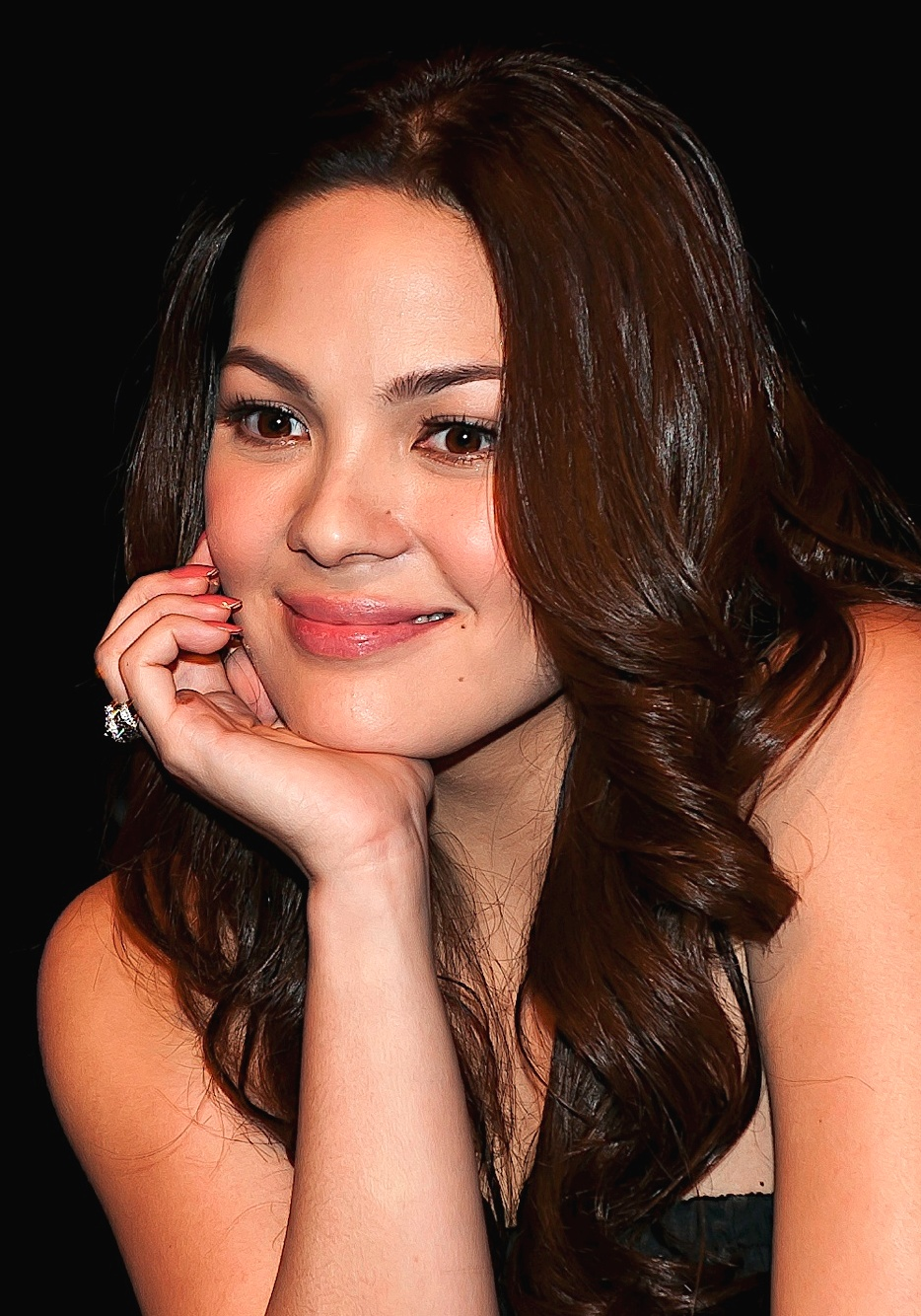
- Concepcion at her US concert press conference, November 2010
- Studio albums: 2
- Soundtrack albums: 3
- Singles: 4
- Music videos: 4

Filipina singer-songwriter KC Concepcion has released two studio albums, 4 singles and 4 music videos. Concepcion has sold more than 7 thousand albums and over a million digital download in the Philippines alone. KC signed a record deal with Star Records and Sony Music in 2008 and released her eponymous debut album in the same year. In the Philippines, "a.k.a Cassandra" peak at number 1 on the iTunes, MyMusicStore, Astrovision and other OPM charts. and was certified platinum by the Philippine Association of the Record Industry (PARI). The album produced two singles, all of which charted within the top twenty in the Pinoy Myx Countdown Philippines. "Imposible" eponymous debut single has made Philippine music history which marked 1 million downloads online.

KC released her second studio album, KC, in 2010. The album peaked at number one on the OPM charts. KC also produced two singles. "Not Like The Movies" (2010), the first single from KC became Concepcion's best-charting song at the time, peaking at number one on OPM charts and radio charts. It was written and produced by Jaye Muller and Ben Patton, as was the song "After the End" on the same album.

Concepcion also appeared on various movie soundtrack for her movies For the First Time, When I Met You and Forever and a Day." Concepcion is currently signed with Star Records and Sony Music for another yet to come unannounced third studio album.

== Albums ==
=== Studio albums ===
List of studio albums, with selected chart positions, sales figures and certifications
Title	Album details	Peak chart positions			Certifications
Title	Album details	MyMusicStore	Astrovision	OPMChart	Certifications
a.k.a Cassandra	Released: 2008; Label: Sony BMG; Formats: CD, digital download	1			PARI: Platinum
KC	Released: 2010; Label: Sony Music Entertainment; Formats: CD, digital download	1	1	3	PARI: Gold

=== Soundtrack ===
Date of release	Label	Title	Format
2008	Star Records	For The First Time Soundtrack	CD, digital download
2009	GMA Records	When i Met You Soundtrack	CD, digital download
2011	Star Records	Forever And A Day Soundtrack	CD, digital download

== Singles ==
List of singles, with selected chart positions, sales figures
Year	Title	Peak chart positions				Sales	Album
Year	Title	Pinoy Myx Countdown	Most Played	Myx Hit Chart	AvEnZ Hit List of 24	Sales	Album
2008	Impossible	13	-			PARI: 1,000,000	a.k.a Cassandra
2010	Not Like The Movies	3	4	18	16		KC
2010	Takipsilim	18	-				KC

== Music videos ==
Year	Title	Album
2008	"Imposible"	a.k.a Cassandra
2008	"For The First Time"	For The First Time Soundtrack
2010	"Not Like The Movies"	KC
2010	"Takipsilim"	KC
