= Perz =

Perz is a surname. Notable people with the surname include:

- Helmuth Perz (born 1923), Austrian long-distance runner
- Mickey Perz (born 1984), Filipino-Swiss dancer
- Rosa Perz, Austrian luger
- Rudolf Perz (born 1972), Austrian footballer
- Sally Perz, American politician
- Bertrand Perz, Austrian academic
