= Lovers in Paris (Philippine TV series) =

- Title card
- Genre: Drama; Romance
- Created by: ABS-CBN Studios; SBS (South Korea)
- Based on: Lovers in Paris (South Korea) by Kim Eun-sook and Shin Woo-chul
- Written by: Shaira Mella; Generiza Reyes; Ricardo Fernando III
- Directed by: FM Reyes
- Starring: KC Concepcion; Piolo Pascual; Zanjoe Marudo
- Opening theme: "Wag Na Wag Mong Sasabihin" by Piolo Pascual and KC Concepcion
- Country of origin: Philippines
- Original language: Filipino
- No. of episodes: 55

Production
- Executive producers: Carlo Katigbak; Cory Vidanes; Laurenti Dyogi; Malou Santos; Ginny Monteagudo-Ocampo
- Producer: Lindsay Anne Dizon
- Production locations: Manila, Philippines; Paris, France
- Editors: Aries Pascual; Sonny de Jesus; Dennis Salgado
- Running time: 30-45 minutes
- Production company: Star Creatives

Original release
- Network: ABS-CBN
- Release: September 28 – December 11, 2009

Lovers in Paris is a 2009 Philippine television drama series broadcast by ABS-CBN. The series is based on the 2004 South Korean drama series of the same title. Directed by FM Reyes, it stars KC Concepcion, Piolo Pascual and Zanjoe Marudo. It aired on the network's Primetime Bida line up and worldwide on TFC from September 28 to December 11, 2009, replacing Tayong Dalawa and was replaced by Habang May Buhay.

== Premise ==
A story of three people will discover the complexities of love. For Vivian, love is the greatest thing to give and to receive. For Carlo, love is but a responsibility. For Martin, love is self-gratification. Despite their different views, these three will learn go through a life-changing experience when their paths cross in Paris.

== Cast and characters ==
=== Main cast ===
- KC Concepcion as Vivian Vizcarra
- Piolo Pascual as Carlo Aranaz
- Zanjoe Marudo as Martin Aranaz Barrameda

=== Supporting cast ===
- Christopher de Leon as George Aranaz
- Mark Gil as John Palma
- Maricar Reyes as Karen Roxas
- Assunta De Rossi as Eunice Gatus
- Rachel Anne Wolfe as Louise Aranaz Barrameda

=== Extended cast ===
- K Brosas as Michelle
- Hyubs Azarcon as Joon
- Ching Arellano as Popoy
- Aaron Junatas as Keon
- Maria Isabel Lopez as Julia Francisco-Gatus
- Matthew Ku Aquino as Alex Gatus
- Savannah Lamsen as Innah Fernandez
- Dionne Monsanto as Jennifer
- Daisy Cariño as Carla
- Manuel Chua as Albert Samaniego
- Zaira dela Peña as Carlene

=== Guest cast ===
- Sophia Baars as young Vivian
- Joshua Dionisio as young Carlo
- Jairus Aquino as young Martin
- Soliman Cruz as McArthur "Mac" Vizcarra
- Melissa Mendez as Rowena Vizcarra
- Alwyn Uytingco as Dennis Mariano
- Dick Israel as Kabab
- Jubail Andres as bartender
- Digna Roosevelt as Bridge
- Kevin Viard as hotel owner
- Marvin Raymundo as bartender
- John Tagle as Mr. Loxen
- Daniel Revilla as Renzo Barrameda
- JC Lourry Navarro as friend of young Carlo

== Production ==
Lovers in Paris is a Korean drama produced by Seoul Broadcasting System in 2004, starring Kim Jung-eun, Park Shin-yang and Lee Dong-gun. ABS-CBN dubbed the series in Filipino and aired it on the network from November 15, 2004 to January 28, 2005.

The Philippine adaptation of Lovers in Paris marked the first primetime television project for Concepcion and her first pairing with Pascual. Principal photography began during the first quarter of 2009 in Paris, France. Filming for the series concluded in the Philippines on December 3, 2009.

=== Pilot week marathon ===
On October 3, 2009, ABS-CBN aired a special encore marathon of the first few episodes of Lovers in Paris due to public demand. Viewers in several areas were unable to watch the premiere week because of electricity outages caused by Typhoon Ondoy.

== See also ==
- List of programs broadcast by ABS-CBN
- List of ABS-CBN Studios original drama series
