= Gee-Ann Abrahan =

Filipino actress (born 1985)

Gee-Ann Abrahan-Perz
- Born: Gianina Maria Sta. Maria Abrahan; November 6, 1985 (age 40)
- Education: Assumption College San Lorenzo
- Occupations: Actress; Model
- Years active: 2007–present
- Agents: Star Magic (2007–2010); Viva Entertainment
- Spouse: Mickey Perz (m. 2016)
- Children: 2

Gianina Maria Sta. Maria Abrahan-Perz (born November 6, 1985), also known as Gee-Ann Abrahan, is a Filipino actress and former reality show contestant. She came to prominence from her stint in the second season of Pinoy Big Brother, hailed as the fourth Big Placer, placing behind Wendy Valdez, Mickey Perz and season winner Beatriz Saw.

== Early life ==
Abrahan was born in Quezon City, Philippines. An alumna of Assumption College in San Lorenzo, Makati, she was part of the school's cheerleading team. She is a collector of voodoo dolls and stuffed toys since the age of six. During her stay in the Pinoy Big Brother House, she brought along the doll she owned the longest, a baby doll called Pamela which had been in her possession for 15 years. On Day 63 of the reality show, she gave Pamela away to an orphaned girl as part of a sacrifice and letting go.

== Career ==
After her Pinoy Big Brother stint, Gee-Ann was cast in a lead role for the romance-fantasy series Love Spell in a multi-episodic story entitled Bumalaka, Bulalakaw, Boom alongside her PBB crushes Bodie Cruz and Mickey Perz. Abrahan became a guest cast of various ABS-CBN television series, including the second installment of the Sineserye Presents: The Susan Roces Cinema Collection, Maligno alongside Kim Chiu and Claudine Barretto. In 2009, she was cast as Tammy Bernal in a supporting role in Habang May Buhay, with the comeback of the Judy Ann Santos-Gladys Reyes tandem. Currently, she is a Viva artist.

== Personal life ==
Abrahan was in a relationship with fellow-PBB Season 2 ex-housemate Mickey Perz from 2009. They married in 2016 and have two children together.

== Filmography ==
=== Television ===
Year	Title	Role
2010	Your Song: "Kim"	Yuri
2010	Precious Hearts Romances: "Kristine"	Ashley (Girl In The Bar)
2010	MMK Episode: "Pass Book"	Shirley
2010	Wansapanataym: "Kokak"	Diwata
2010	Precious Hearts Romances: "Impostor"	Mrs. Benitez (Mother Of Mariz)
2010	MMK Episode "School Building"	Anna
2010	Magkaribal	Elaine
2010	Kung Tayo'y Magkakalayo	Aliya (Guest Artist)
2010	Habang May Buhay	Tammy Bernal
2009	MMK Episode "Lubid"	Mayumi
2009	Pinoy Big Brother: Double Up	Guest Performer
2008	Pinoy Big Brother Teen Edition Plus	Performer
2008	Mars Ravelos: Tiny Tony	Mika
2008	Kung Fu Kids	Kizhia
2008	Sineserye Presents: Maligno	Eliza's Roommate
2007	Love Spell Present: "Bumalaka, Bulalakaw, Boom!"	Nina
2007	Your Song: "Ale"	Guest Artist
2007	Pinoy Big Brother: Season 2	Housemate

=== Films ===
Year	Title	Role
2008	For the First Time	Michelle
2010	I'll Be There	Sheila
2010	My Amnesia Girl	Paula
2010	Ang Tanging Ina Mo (Last na 'To!)	Agnes (Cameo Role)
2010	Shake, Rattle & Roll XII	Sam
2011	Bulong	Chery
2011	The Adventures of Pureza	Leah
2012	A Secret Affair	Katie
2013	It Takes a Man and a Woman	Marie
2014	ABNKKBSNPLAko?!	Dalagita Student

== Awards ==
Awards
PBB Season 2 4th Big Placer

== See also ==
- Pinoy Big Brother: Season 2
- ABS-CBN
- Star Magic
- Viva Entertainment
