= Alexander Suppantschitsch =

Austrian footballer and manager

Personal information
- Date of birth: 14 June 1972 (age 54)
- Place of birth: Austria
- Position: Defender

Youth career
- –1989: Austria Klagenfurt

Senior career*
Years	Team	Apps	(Gls)
1989–1992	Austria Klagenfurt		
1992	SAK Klagenfurt		
1992–1993	WSG Brückl		
1993–1997	Austria Klagenfurt		
1997	SK Treibach		
1997–1999	FC St. Veit		
1999–2000	SC Landskron		
2000–2002	Friesacher AC		
2002–2004	SV Feldkirchen		
2004–2007	Annabichler SV		
2007–2010	HSV Klagenfurt		
2010–2011	Annabichler SV		

Managerial career
- 2008: HSV Klagenfurt
- 2009–2013: Annabichler SV
- 2014: SK Austria Klagenfurt
- 2015–: ASKÖ Wölfnitz
- * Club domestic league appearances and goals

Alexander Suppantschitsch (born 14 June 1972) is a former Austrian footballer and current manager. He currently manages ASKÖ Wölfnitz.
