= Pinoy Big Brother: Season 2 =

Pinoy Big Brother
- Season 2
- Presented by: Toni Gonzaga; Bianca Gonzalez; Mariel Rodriguez; Jason Gainza
- No. of days: 126
- No. of housemates: 18
- Winner: Beatriz Saw
- Runner-up: Mickey Perz

Release
- Original network: ABS-CBN
- Original release: February 25 – June 30, 2007

Season chronology
- ← Previous; Season 1 Next → Double Up

The second season of the reality game show Pinoy Big Brother aired on ABS-CBN for 126 days from February 25 to June 30, 2007.

This season is the second civilian season and fourth season overall to air on the network. This season broke the previous season's record of fourteen days, which was the longest stay of housemates inside the house until it was broken by the next civilian season by only seven days.

The season was won by Beatriz Saw, who garnered over 1.5 million votes, or about 30.29% of total votes cast during the open voting, which started on June 17, 2007. This is also the record-breaking highest total of actual votes in the history of Pinoy Big Brother and other all text-based votes reality programs in the Philippines as of now.

== Overview ==
=== House Concept ===
The concept of the house is a pop-art scheme, with a predominantly lime green living area with pastel colors. It has been equipped with 42 cameras and 42 overhead microphones. The men's bedroom have the beds in a linear pattern, while the women's beds in their bedroom are in a circular pattern. Rocking chairs and other furniture have also been added, as well as gym equipment, a large bathroom with showers and a jacuzzi, separate restrooms for the men and women, a separate prayer room, and a bridge over the swimming pool. The confession (aka diary) room is now tangerine-colored and expanded. Furthermore, the front doors to the house are now located at the garden, leading to the eviction hall next door.

There are two secret areas in the house. The first secret area is separated from the garden by a gate. It is initially filled with sand and had bamboo furniture and an area for urination. The secret housemates occupied this area in their first five days of stay in the house. Afterwards, the location became common knowledge for the housemates and it has been used as an activity area. The other secret area is adjacent to the confession room. It has been previously used by Gee-Ann, Wendy, and Mickey as a "quarantine area" when they caught Robert's "disease" on Week 5.

The interiors of the various rooms were designed by students from the Philippine School of Interior Design. The revamped larger layout of the House could be attributed to the fact that the House was previously used as the academy during the filming of Pinoy Dream Academy. Major renovations had to be done for the second season.

=== Hosts ===
Toni Gonzaga and Mariel Rodriguez reprised their roles as primetime and UpLate hosts respectively, while Celebrity Edition housemate Bianca Gonzalez hosted the Update reports. First season housemate Jason Gainza joined the hosts as the Man-of-the-Street reporter. Meanwhile, Asia Agcaoili again took hosting chores for the show's companion program on Studio 23, along with the puppet Pining. They shared hosting chores with new host Sitti Navarro.

Also for the show's new season, the theme song Pinoy Ako had been rehashed, this time performed by the band Cebalo, composed of Yvan Lambatan, Panky Trinidad, Eman Abatayo, and Davey Langit of Pinoy Dream Academy. The show also used the songs Time In by Yeng Constantino and Arigatou Tomodachi by Jun Hirano, Jay-R Siaboc and Eman Abatayo as part of the background music.

Aside from Gonzalez's Updates aired throughout the day, the morning show Magandang Umaga, Pilipinas and its successor Umagang Kay Ganda also reported updates from inside the House.

=== Edition Twists ===
- Secret Housemates - Aside from the first two batches of housemates, four additional housemates were made to enter an adjacent area where they were to be kept hidden from the rest of the housemates except for two housemates, Zeke, the first housemate to enter, and Dionne, the last housemate to enter. From the four, only two became official housemates after undergoing a public voting.
- Big Red Phone - On Day 23, a large red telephone was placed inside the House. It was announced the day before that the phone would ring in different instances, and each call would inform the housemate who would answer the call of a different reward or punishment.
- Immunity Challenges - Several challenges were held in the house which granted immunity from being nominated to the winner.
- Houseguests: Three houseguests stayed in the House for no more than a specific amount of time without undergoing the nomination and eviction process.
- Big Brother Swap - One Philippine housemate would trade places with another housemate from Big Brother Slovenia.
- Balik-Bahay - Four ex-housemates from the season were brought back in the house and kept hidden in a secret room, whilst the public were voting for two housemates to go back inside the house and once again compete as regular housemates.

== Housemates and houseguests ==
On Day 1, only six housemates entered the house. The next six housemates entered the house on Days 7 to 12. The final four housemates entered the house on Day 14. The number of housemates thus reached 16, although only 14 were promised in the pre-season teasers. This last batch of housemates were put up for public voting. Two of the final four housemates were eventually voted to stay in the house, thus completing the list of 14 housemates. Due to the unprecedented Forced Eviction of Maricris, an additional housemate was scheduled to enter the house. Instead of just one housemate, Big Brother decided to let two mothers enter, deviating from the young group of housemates that were already in the house. By the end of the week, one of the two mothers was chosen by the housemates to stay in the house. Conversely, the other housemate was evicted from the house. All in all, there were 18 housemates for this season, 15 of which were official housemates and 3 sub-official housemates.

Name	Age on entry	Hometown	Entered	Exited	Result
Beatriz Saw	21	Baao	Day 8	Day 126	Winner
Mickey Perz	23	Switzerland	Day 1	Day 126	Runner-up
Wendy Valdez	25	Navotas	Day 78	Day 126	3rd Place
Wendy Valdez	25	Navotas	Day 1	Day 70	Evicted
Gee-Ann Abrahan	21	Quezon City	Day 1	Day 126	4th Place
Bodie Cruz	21	Las Piñas	Day 14	Day 124	Evicted
Bruce Quebral	25	Cainta	Day 11	Day 122	Evicted
Nel Rapiz	25	Iloilo City	Day 1	Day 119	Evicted
Robert Woods II	24	Birmingham, UK	Day 7	Day 112	Evicted
Saicy Aguila	23	Bacolod	Day 1	Day 105	Evicted
Kian Kazemi	21	Makati	Day 78	Day 98	Evicted
Kian Kazemi	21	Makati	Day 9	Day 49	Evicted
Yen Galagnara	35	Quezon City	Day 70	Day 91	Evicted
Ezekiel Dimaguila	21	Australia	Day 1	Day 34	Evicted
Jasmin Engracia	22	Davao City	Day 10	Day 29	Evicted
Dionne Monsanto	21	Cebu City	Day 12	Day 77	Evicted
Geraldine Javier	32	Quezon City	Day 70	Day 77	Evicted
Maricris Dizon	27	Italy	Day 14	Day 65	Forcibly Evicted
Jeremy Hidano	21	Japan	Day 14	Day 22	Evicted
Mikah Dizon	20	Baguio	Day 14	Day 22	Evicted

=== Houseguests ===
Aside from the housemates, three houseguests entered the Big Brother House on this season. The first houseguest is Tina Semolič, as part of the Big Brother Swap with Slovenia. The second houseguest is Hanna Eunice Rodriguez, as the winner of the Globe promotion on being a housemate for a week. The third houseguest is Uma Khouny.

- Tina Semolič – The first houseguest was Tina Semolič, a 22-year-old former beauty queen from Koper, Slovenia. A contestant in the Slovenian version, she was involved in the Big Brother Swap, trading places with Bruce. She was profiled as a fatherless woman who tried her best for mother and siblings. She stayed from Days 56 to 61. She later returned on Day 125 to celebrate with the final four housemates (Gee-Ann, Mickey, Beatriz, and Wendy). (More details on Big Brother Swap section)
- Hanna Eunice Rodriguez – The second houseguest was Hanna Eunice Rodriguez, a 21-year-old college student and single mother from Las Piñas. She has been profiled as a woman with a riches-to-rags story after her father was swindled by a Singaporean man. Despite her current poverty, her family remains united and she remains strong through many hardships. She stayed from Days 85 to 91, and her stay was made possible by a promotion launched by Globe Telecom, giving its subscribers a chance to live inside the House for a week. Hanna was among the twenty subscribers screened for the show, who in turn were selected from those who joined the promotion.
- Uma Khouny – The third houseguest was Uma Khouny, the 25-year-old former first season housemate, who visited the house to train the housemates in scaring people. He stayed from Days 109 to 111. He also had an objective of turning the housemates against each other, but he only managed to stir up the relationship between Bruce and Wendy.

== Weekly tasks ==
Task No.	Date given	Description	Bet	Result
1	February 26, 2007 (Day 02)	Sand by Me; Build a sand castle which replicates a model nearby. It must be done in beach wear and while Pinoy Ako was being played.	50%	Passed^{T1}
2	March 5, 2007 (Day 09)	Room Service; Cook several dishes ordered by Big Brother. They should wear toques while doing the task.	60%	Failed
3	March 12, 2007 (Day 16)	Harry Potter; Make several pieces of pottery using the clay provided.	75%	Failed
4	March 19, 2007 (Day 23)	A-maze-ing Task; Cross a string maze on Day 27 without touching any of the strings or sounding the bells that are attached to the strings. The bells should not be sounded eight or more times.	50%	Failed
5	March 26, 2007 (Day 30)	Watermill or No Mill; Run a water mill using water from the swimming pool. This should be done manually and the mill should run day and night. The mill should not stop for more than 30 seconds.	60%	Passed
6	April 2, 2007 (Day 37)	Egg-specially for Easter; Make 500 Easter eggs each filled with leche flan mixture. They should be dressed as rabbits and should hop around.	60%	Failed
7	April 9, 2007 (Day 44)	Rice to the Occasion; Process several sacks of newly harvested rise using the method of pagbabayo or rice pounding using mortars, pestles, and bilao (woven bamboo platters). They should also wear traditional Filipino clothes.	100%^{T2}	Passed^{T3}
8	April 16, 2007 (Day 51)	100 Treasures; Take on several survival tasks, while dressed as different kinds of people depending on the task. In the process, they would earn gold coins.	Weekly allowance would depend on coins amassed.	Passed^{T4}
9	April 23, 2007 (Day 58)	Big Brother Fiesta; Organize and prepare an original festival to let Slovenian housemate Tina immerse in the colorful Philippine fiestas and the well-known "Filipino hospitality."	85%	Passed
10	April 30, 2007 (Day 65)	School Daze/Summer-yenda ni Kuya; Take part in activities which would enable them to raise no less than P300,000 to be donated to some elementary schoolchildren in Iloilo for their school supplies and the repair of their dilapidated school buildings. First was making summer foodstuffs and desserts to be sold to passers-by outside the House. The second was organizing and staging a puppet show.	Weekly allowance not bet.	Passed^{T5}
11	May 14, 2007 (Day 79)	Ano ang Habi N'yo? Find a way to unwind a large, compacted ball of rope using their hands and teeth and use the rope to make a large welcome mat.	75%	Failed
12	May 21, 2007 (Day 86)	Boat Wisely; Build four boats using the materials provided. Boats would tested (supposedly) on Day 90.^{T6}	50%	Passed
13	May 28, 2007 (Day 93)	Return of the Dominoes; Build a tower/wall of dominoes six feet high. One housemate should be seated inside the domino wall at all times to watch over the rising tower and anyone who wants to be in the center has to enter it carefully through a small portal. The person in the center cannot help in building the tower.	50%	Failed
14	June 4, 2007 (Day 100)	Pang-Sirko Tayo! Perform three circus acts: tightrope walking, juggling four bowling pins, and training the House pet Buddy to jump through hoops.	33% for each act	Failed
15	June 11, 2007 (Day 107)	Big Brother House of Horrors; Organize an attraction wherein the House would become a haunted house where people would visit on Day 110.	Weekly allowance would depend on percentage of people who felt they were scared during the attraction.	Passed^{T7}
16	June 18, 2007 (Day 114)	Pinoy Big Brother Big Dream Wedding; Plan and organize a wedding inside the House, complete with tuxedos, wedding dresses, and wedding cakes. They would also take part in activities that would provide them with various essentials for the wedding.	100%	Passed

^Note T1: Though successful, only 25% was added because the sand castle they made was not the same as the model. PHP1,199 was also deducted from the budget to pay for the vase Gee-Ann accidentally broke during the week. An additional PHP750 was added the next day after the housemates successfully brought down the rest of their luggage without getting any of those bags wet in the pool.
^Note T2: The housemates were supposed to bet 60% of their budget, but Big Brother requested that they bet their entire budget because the rice processed in this task would be donated to charity.
^Note T3: The entire task was stopped after three days and was deemed a success. In exchange, Big Brother would fulfill his promise of donating a sack of rice to a family of each housemate's choice.
^Note T4: Eighty-seven coins were collected, so 87% was added to their weekly budget.
^Note T5: This particular weekly task took two weeks. A total of P325,713.50 was amassed; the two activities alone raised P175,713.50, not including monetary donations from the show's sponsors and donations of shoes and school supplies.
^Note T6: The boats were actually tested on Day 92 because of the rains that plagued the week.
^Note T7: Out of 260 people who entered the House of Horrors, 219 (85%) of them felt fear as opposed to 41 who felt the ride was corny. The budget was therefore increased by 85%.

== The Big Red Phone ==
On Day 23 (March 19, 2007), a large red telephone was placed inside the House. It was announced the day before that the phone would ring in different instances, and each call would inform the housemate who would answer the call of a different reward or punishment. The housemate who would answer each call would receive any of the following news:

- 1st Call (Day 23): Staying in the sun for a day and no baths for two days (received by Ezekiel)
- 2nd Call (Day 23): Haircut, facial massage, and "full body foot massage" (received by Mickey)
- 3rd Call (Day 25): The granting of any one wish, regardless of the result of any task (received by Bodie, who ordered pizza)
- 4th Call (Day 25): A 60-second shopping spree in the Storage Room (received by Dionne)
- 5th Call (Day 26): Being the "pet of the day" (received by Nel)
- 6th Call (Day 27): The power to change the second set of nominees (received by Wendy, who retained the set of nominees as is)
- 7th Call (Day 29): Automatic nomination (received by Beatriz)
- 8th Call (Day 32): A secret date with another housemate (received by Bruce, who chose Wendy to be his date)
- 9th Call (Day 44): Playing Sadako of the Japanese movie Ring and living in a well for a day (received by Kian)
- 10th Call (Day 45): Walking around blindfolded for a day without any help from the others (received by Gee-Ann)
- 11th Call (Day 45): A chance to conquer one's fear (received by Saicy whose fear is snakes)
- 12th Call (Day 62): Shaving one's eyebrow (received by Robert, who had his right eyebrow shaved in exchange for an operation on a hare-lipped child)
- 13th Call (Day 65): A kiss of Judas—i.e. the recipient of the call kisses a housemate, who in turn gains an automatic nomination (received by Mickey, who kissed Saicy; this is supposedly for Maricris, the only one not to receive a call, but since she was evicted forcibly, Big Brother allowed any of the remaining housemates still inside to pick up the phone, even though they already answered it)

== Big Brother Swap ==
A screenshot from the show Pinoy Big Brother (season 2) for the Big Swap between Philippines and Slovenia.

The official website announced on Day 47 that one Philippine housemate would trade places with a housemate from the Slovenian version. Days later, Tina was chosen to swap with Bruce.

Promotion ads for this event likened this to an alien abduction because the Philippine housemates were not be aware that Bruce will trade places with Tina, a foreigner, until Tina entered the Philippine House. On the other hand, the Slovenian housemates already knew of the Swap and prepared for this event, which was expected to be a cultural exchange of sorts for both sides. The swap took place starting Day 56 (April 21) and ended on Day 61 (April 26), when the swapped housemates returned to their respective Houses.

Tina Semolič, a 22-year-old former beauty queen, was chosen by the Philippine version's staff because of her personality "would fit well" with the Filipino housemates, as well as being nice and not too aggressive. On the other hand, Bruce was chosen by the Slovenian staff because of his physique and his "very Filipino" characteristics that would stir up competition among the men there.

To let Filipino viewers know about Bruce's situation in the Slovenian House, some footage from the Slovenian version related to Bruce was also shown, aside from the events inside the Philippine House. English conversations recorded on both Houses were subtitled into Filipino, while any Slovenian conversation and comment was dubbed over by Filipino voice actors to let the Filipino viewers understand better.

Below is a list of activities each swapped housemate did in their respective host country's Houses, aside from introductions and trading of basic phrases:

Tina	Taught the housemates the Slovenian polka.; Cooked a Slovenian desert called a potica.; Learned to properly eat a mango.; Learned from Saicy and Wendy how to sing Pinoy Ako and explain its meaning.; Told by Nel to eat some Filipino street foods, but she refused to eat balut after squirming at the sight of its contents.; Practiced baton twirling together with Beatriz and Saicy.; Acted as Reyna Elena in the House's celebration of the Santacruzan.; Took part in the PBB Fiesta, even finishing the game of palo sebo for her fellow housemates.
Bruce	Cooked adobo for his fellow housemates. The Slovenian housemates thought it was so delicious, even Sonja, the resident vegetarian, ate it, too.; Taught the housemates tinikling. But since the others had a hard time keeping the rhythm in the dance, they later turned one of the two bamboo poles used in the dance into a limbo pole.; Learned the Slovenian version's theme song.; Built a snowman out of artificial snow (together with his fellow housemates). Real snow could not be provided because winter had already passed in Slovenia.; Signed T-shirts for an upcoming auction. Slovenian viewers already knew about his mother's condition and sales from the auction will be used for her benefit.; Participated in a task which required the housemates to disguise themselves as animals using body paint. Bruce played a cow.

While Tina left the Philippines without much incident, Bruce left Slovenia with controversy brewing up behind him. Slovenian housemates Miha and Pero made inappropriate remarks about Bruce — remarks that did not sit well with both Big Brother and the viewers there. Because of that and Pero's "plan" of "stabbing Big Brother," Big Brother removed Pero from the Slovenian House and then added Miha to the list of nominees for eviction, which already included Jasmina and Sonja.

Tina was eventually evicted from the Slovenian House on Day 63 of the Slovenian version, about five weeks after the Swap.

On Day 125 of the Philippine version, Tina returned to the Pinoy Big Brother house to have a celebratory dinner with the Big 4, Bea, Gee-Ann, Mickey and Wendy. She left the house the same night and participated in the Finale, where she danced various Philippine dances and took part in the awarding ceremony for the Big 4.

== Nomination history ==
The housemate first mentioned in each nomination gets two points, while the second gets one point.

Pinoy Big Brother: Season 2 nomination history
	#1	#2	#3	#4	#5	#6		#7	#8	#9	#10	#11	#12	#13	#14	BIG NIGHT	Nominations received
Eviction day and date	Day 22 March 18	Day 29 March 25	Day 34 March 30	Day 49 April 14	Day 70 May 5	Day 77 May 12		Day 84 May 19	Day 91 May 26	Day 98 June 2	Day 105 June 9	Day 112 June 16	Day 119 June 23	Day 122 June 26	Day 124 June 28	Day 126 June 30	Nominations received
Nomination day and date	Day 16; March 12	Day 23; March 19	Day 30; March 26	Day 43; April 8	Day 66; May 1	Day 71; May 6		Day 78; May 13	Day 85; May 20	Day 92; May 27	Day 99; June 3	Day 106; June 10	Day 113; June 17				Nominations received
Beatriz	No nominations	Mickey; Robert	Dionne; Saicy	No nominations	Robert; Bodie	Yen	Dionne; Saicy	No nominations	Bruce; Nel	Mickey; Bodie	Robert; Bruce	Robert; Bruce	No nominations	No nominations	No nominations	Winner	23 (+1)
Mickey	No nominations	Jasmin; Beatriz	Ezekiel; Saicy	No nominations	Dionne; Saicy	Yen	Dionne; Saicy	No nominations	Beatriz; Yen	Kian; Nel	Wendy; Saicy	Nel; Bruce	No nominations	No nominations	No nominations	Runner-Up	25
Wendy	No nominations	Gee-Ann; Jasmin	Gee-Ann; Ezekiel	No nominations	Beatriz; Gee-Ann	Evicted (Day 70)		Re-entered (Day 78)	Exempt	Mickey; Nel	Mickey; Bodie	Mickey; Robert	No nominations	No nominations	No nominations	3rd Place	12 (+1)
Gee-Ann	No nominations	Beatriz; Mickey	Wendy; Ezekiel	No; Nominations	Nel; Robert	Yen	Bruce; Nel	No nominations	Nel; Yen	Nel; Kian	Bruce; Nel	Bruce; Wendy	No nominations	No nominations	No nominations	4th Place	17 (+2)
Bodie	No; Nominations	Exempt	Bruce; Maricris	No; Nominations	Dionne; Beatriz	Yen	Dionne; Nel	No nominations	Robert; Beatriz	Kian; Beatriz	Beatriz; Robert	Robert; Beatriz	No nominations	No nominations	No nominations	Evicted (Day 124)	13 (+2)
Bruce	No nominations	Jasmin; Saicy	Ezekiel; Wendy	No nominations	Exempt	Yen	Dionne; Bodie	No nominations	Yen; Bodie	Mickey; Bodie	Gee-Ann; Saicy	Mickey; Robert	No nominations	No nominations	Evicted (Day 122)		18
Nel	No nominations	Jasmin; Beatriz	Bodie; Dionne	No nominations	Dionne; Saicy	Yen	Dionne; Saicy	No nominations	Robert; Mickey	Robert; Wendy	Saicy; Gee-Ann	Gee-Ann; Bruce	No nominations	Evicted (Day 119)			25
Robert	No nominations	Jasmin; Beatriz	Ezekiel; Bodie	No nominations	Dionne; Beatriz	Yen	Dionne; Nel	No nominations	Yen; Beatriz	Kian; Nel	Beatriz; Nel	Nel; Beatriz	Evicted (Day 112)				23
Saicy	No nominations	Gee-Ann; Jasmin	Gee-Ann; Ezekiel	No nominations	Dionne; Gee-Ann	Yen	Nel; Mickey	No nominations	Nel; Mickey	Mickey; Beatriz	Beatriz; Mickey	Evicted (Day 105)					15 (+2)
Kian	No nominations	Wendy; Mickey	Wendy; Mickey	No; Nominations	Evicted (Day 49)			Re-entered (Day 78)	Exempt	Bodie; Robert	Re-evicted (Day 98)						7 (+2)
Yen	Not in the House					Nominated	Exempt	No nominations	Robert; Bruce	Evicted (Day 91)							6 (+1)
Dionne	No nominations	Jasmin; Robert	Ezekiel; Nel	No; Nominations	Bodie; Saicy	Yen	Mickey; Nel	Evicted (Day 77)									27 (+1)
Geraldine	Not in the House					Nominated	Exempt	Evicted (Day 77)									9 (+1)
Maricris	No; Nominations	Exempt	Ezekiel; Bruce	No nominations	Forced Eviction (Day 65)												1 (+1)
Ezekiel	No nominations	Saicy; Gee-Ann	Dionne; Gee-Ann	Evicted (Day 34)													13
Jasmin	No nominations	Bruce; Wendy	Evicted (Day 29)														12
Jeremy	No; Nominations	Evicted (Day 22)															0 (+1)
Mikah	No; Nominations	Evicted (Day 22)															0 (+1)
Notes	1	2	3	4	5	6		7	8	None		9	10				
Up for eviction	Bodie; Jeremy; Maricris; Mikah	Beatriz; Gee-Ann; Jasmin; Kian	Beatriz; Dionne; Ezekiel; Gee-Ann; Wendy	Bodie; Dionne; Gee-Ann; Kian	Dionne; Saicy; Wendy	Geraldine; Yen	Dionne; Nel	Ezekiel; Jasmin; Kian; Wendy	Gee-Ann; Robert; Saicy; Yen	Kian; Mickey	Beatriz; Saicy	Bruce; Robert	Open Voting				
Saved from eviction	Bodie; 39.33% Maricris; 25.08%	Gee-Ann; 43.37% Kian; 25.19% Beatriz; 20.62%	Gee-Ann; 30.76% Beatriz; 20.15% Wendy; 17.43% Dionne; 15.98%	Gee-Ann; 28.9% Dionne; 26.65% Bodie; 24.90%	Dionne; 40.32% Saicy; 30.09%	Yen; 9 of 9 votes	Nel; 61.27%	Wendy; 54.04% Kian; 17.71%	Gee-Ann; 40.18% Saicy; 30.52% Robert; 24.71%	Mickey; 54.00%	Beatriz; 60.58%	Bruce; 56.01%	Beatriz; Gee-Ann; Mickey; Wendy			Beatriz; 30.29%	
Evicted	Jeremy; 24.13% Mikah; 11.46%	Jasmin; 10.82%	Ezekiel; 15.67%	Kian; 19.55%	Wendy; 29.59%	Geraldine; 0 of 9 votes	Dionne; 38.73%	Jasmin; 15.64% Ezekiel; 12.61%	Yen; 4.59%	Kian; 46.00%	Saicy; 39.32%	Robert; 43.99%	Nel; 3.75%	Bruce; 6.35%	Bodie; 12.46%	Mickey; 24.79% Wendy; 23.32% Gee-Ann; 21.58%	
Forced Eviction	none				Maricris	none										Mickey; 24.79% Wendy; 23.32% Gee-Ann; 21.58%	

Granted Immunity (due to successful execution of "Secret Task", challenge winner, etc.)
Automatic Nomination (due to violation(s) committed, 5-pound Weight gain Rule, "Big Red Telephone" Challenge, etc.)

^Note 1: The four secret housemates were put up for eviction because only two people were needed to complete the official housemate roster of fourteen.
^Note 2: A lottery was held by Big Brother for the six housemates who have violated house rules, where Kian lost (thus slapping him an automatic nomination from Big Brother). The two additional housemates, Bodie and Maricris, were exempted from the nominations process for being newcomers, while Ezekiel and Dionne were immune from eviction for successfully completing their special task of keeping the existence of the secret housemates a secret.
^Note 3: Kian became immune from nomination due to his win in the special games on Day 28 and his escape from eviction the following night. Beatriz answered the seventh call from the big red telephone, instantly giving her automatic nomination. Wendy originally used her power of changing the official list of nominees by replacing her name with that of Maricris. But after much reconsideration and a burst of emotion, she asked Big Brother to reverse her decision. Later that night, Big Brother reinstated the original official list of nominees.
^Note 4: There were no nominations on the day of the announcement of nominees. Big Brother automatically put Gee-Ann, Kian, Bodie, and Dionne up for eviction because of Gee-Ann's breach in the five-pound weight gain rule (see above) and Kian, Bodie, and Dionne's negligence in using their lapel microphones.
^Note 5: Bruce was given an exemption on Day 63 from the next nomination round for his accomplishment in the Big Brother Swap. Mickey was also given immunity for winning a special game back in Day 36. Wendy was put up automatically for eviction because of her accidental misuse of her lapel microphone. On Day 65, even before the fourth nomination round could even take place, Maricris was forced out of the House by Big Brother because of her acts and thoughts of violence against herself and several other housemates. On Day 65, after Maricris left, Mickey gave Saicy the "Kiss of Judas", which gave her an automatic nomination. Because of the number of nominees already up for eviction, only Dionne, the highest earner of nomination votes, was included and not Beatriz, the second highest earner.
^Note 6: Geraldine and Yen had just entered the House on Day 70 so they were exempted from nominations. However, only one of them would remain by the next week, and this choice was determined through votes by the other housemates. Yen was unanimously voted by the housemates to stay.
^Note 7: Wendy and Kian were voted back into the house by public voting. Although Ezekiel and Jasmin were evicted on Day 84, Big Brother allowed them to stay in the main house area for one day to resolve former conflicts with the regular housemates. Ezekiel was in the main house area from Day 84 to 85, while Jasmin was in there from Day 85 to 86.
^Note 8: Saicy was nominated for her breach in the weight rule while Gee-Ann was nominated because she admitted to talking while her lapel microphone was accidentally turned off. Kian and Wendy were not yet in the main house area and the other housemates were not yet supposed to know of their presence, so they were not part of the week's nominations. Although technically evicted, Jasmin was present in the House during the announcement of nominees.
^Note 9: Nominations were held face-to-face with numbered badges attached to each nominated housemate. Their face-to-face nominations must be the same as their private nominations earlier; Mickey inadvertently switched the points he gave to Nel and Bruce, but he corrected it after he was reminded by Big Brother of the former's mistake.
^Note 10: All voting would determine the final four and the eventual winner. The lowest three from the seven remaining housemates would each be evicted in the three eviction nights indicated in the table. During each of the eviction nights, the call-out order of names of those who were saved does not reflect their standing in the tally.

Special Voting: Mommy Elections

Geraldine	Yen
0	9

== The Big Night at The Big Dome ==
On June 30, 2007, the season finale, dubbed "The Big Night at The Big Dome" was held at the Smart Araneta Coliseum, also known as the Big Dome. The housemates were transported by vintage cars on the way to the venue. During the program, the fourteen other housemates, as well as Tina Semolic from the Slovenian version, danced various Philippine dances and even the polka. Also present in the event were previous Pinoy Big Brother winners Nene Plamio (née Tamayo) of the first season, Keanna Reeves of the Celebrity Edition, and Kim Chiu of the Teen Edition, as well as Zanjoe Marudo of the Celebrity Edition, and Sam Milby of the first season.

Aside from the opening number, the only other huge number in the mostly formal and story-driven finale was the "final four housemates," played by Jon Santos as Mickey, Candy Pangilinan as Bea, Giselle Sanchez as Gee-Ann and R. S. Francisco as Wendy, engaging on a debate on who should be the winner.

In the end, Beatriz was declared the winner, garnering 1,571,556 votes or 30.29% of total votes cast. Mickey came in second with 1,286,166 votes (24.79%), Wendy, visibly booed by the audience, came up third with 1,209,978 votes (23.32%), and Gee-Ann ended up last at 1,119,714 votes (21.58%). The total number of votes, which were amassed since the start of the open voting on June 17, 2007, broke all records held by all previous editions. For dramatic effect, Beatriz was brought into the stage in a giant disco ball.

This table shows the summary of votes as obtained by each of the Big 4 in the Big Night.

Event	Big 4	Votes		Result
Event	Big 4	Actual Votes	Percentage	Result
Big Night	Beatriz	1,571,556	30.29%	Winner
Big Night	Gee-Ann	1,119,714	21.58%	4th Place
Big Night	Mickey	1,286,166	24.79%	Runner-Up
Big Night	Wendy	1,209,978	23.32%	3rd Place
TOTAL VOTES		5,187,414 votes	99.98%	—N/a

== Official website ==
- Big Brother Slovenia English homepage (set up for updates on the Swap)
- Beatriz Saw - Pinoy Big Brother Season 2 Big Winner

Preceded by Teen Edition 1	Pinoy Big Brother Season 2 (February 25 – June 30, 2007)	Succeeded by Celebrity Edition 2
