= Walter Schoppitsch =

Austrian footballer and manager

Personal information
- Date of birth: 10 December 1954 (age 71)
- Place of birth: Klagenfurt, Austria
- Height: 1.77 m (5 ft 9 1/2 in)
- Position: Midfielder

Senior career*
Years	Team	Apps	(Gls)
1972–1973	Austria Klagenfurt	1	(1)
1973–1974	FC St. Veit		
1974–1976	Austria Klagenfurt	63	(10)
1976–1978	SK VÖEST Linz	70	(9)
1978–1987	Austria Klagenfurt	112	(20)
1987–1989	Wolfsberger AC		

Managerial career
- 1991–1992: Wolfsberger AC
- 1997: Austria Klagenfurt
- 2005–2008: FC Kärnten II
- 2010–2011: SK Austria Klagenfurt
- * Club domestic league appearances and goals

Walter Schoppitsch (born 10 December 1954) is a former Austrian footballer and manager. He last managed SK Austria Klagenfurt in 2011.

== Personal ==
Schoppitsch is the father of professional footballer Kai Schoppitsch.
