= I'll Be There (2010 film) =

- Theatrical movie poster
- Directed by: Maryo J. de los Reyes
- Screenplay by: Athena Aringo; Melissa Mae Chua; Anj Pessumal
- Story by: Artemio C. Abad Jr.; Athena Aringo; Melissa Mae Chua
- Produced by: Charo Santos-Concio; Malou N. Santos
- Starring: Gabby Concepcion; KC Concepcion; Jericho Rosales
- Cinematography: Gary L. Gardoce
- Edited by: Tara Illenberger
- Music by: Jesse Lucas
- Production company: Star Cinema
- Distributed by: ABS-CBN Film Productions (Philippines); TFC at the Movies; 20th Century Fox (International)
- Release date: June 16, 2010
- Country: Philippines
- Language: Filipino
- Box office: ₱41 million

I'll Be There is a 2010 Filipino drama film directed by Maryo J. Delos Reyes and starring the father-and-daughter Gabby Concepcion and KC Concepcion, and Jericho Rosales. It is Star Cinema's offering for Father's Day and premiered in cinemas nationwide on June 16, 2010.

The film had international screenings in select cities in the United States such as San Francisco, Milpitas, Cerritos, Ontario, San Diego (all in California), Seattle, Washington, Honolulu, Hawaii, Las Vegas, Nevada and Bergenfield, New Jersey.

== Plot ==
The story revolves around Maxi dela Cerna, a young, aspiring New York-based fashion designer who returns to the Philippines shortly after her mother's death to find her father. She had been swindled by her ex-boyfriend and hopes to pay off her debts by selling the piece of provincial land that her parents co-owned. But this means spending time with her father whom she hates for walking out on her and her mother 15 years ago. As the uptight and guarded Maxi struggles to immerse herself in farm life and deal with a father she despises, she crosses paths again with Tommy, her childhood friend, now an architect who is trying to heal from his own mistakes in the past with his 7-year-old son.

== Cast ==
Main cast

- Gabby Concepcion as Poch dela Cerna
- KC Concepcion as Maxi/Mina dela Cerna
- Jericho Rosales as Tommy Santibanez

Supporting cast

- Gee-Ann Abrahan as Sheila
- Celia Rodriguez as Conching Collins
- Luz Valdez as Bebang
- Mickey Ferriols as Teresa
- Cacai Bautista as Honey
- Ikey Canoy as Oscar
- Empress Schuck as Portia
- Bugoy Cariño as Pio
- Sheila Marie Rodriguez as Melissa

== Production ==
Scenes from the film were shot in Liliw, Laguna.

== Reception ==
The film only garnered a total of ₱21.7 million on its first five days in theaters. The film ranked third on its opening weekend in the Philippine box office, behind Toy Story 3 and The Karate Kid.
