= KC (album) =

Studio album by KC Concepcion
- Released: April 11, 2010
- Genre: Pop rock
- Length: 47:21
- Labels: Musiko Records; Sony Music Philippines Inc.

KC Concepcion chronology
a.k.a Cassandra (2008)	KC (2010)

Singles from KC
- 1. "Not Like the Movies" Released: March 28, 2010; 2. "Takipsilim" Released: August 31, 2010; 3. "After the End" Released: 2010

KC is the second and last studio album by Filipina singer-songwriter, KC Concepcion. It was released on April 11, 2010, under Musiko Records and Sony Music Philippines Inc.. Songs like "Tayo Na", "Takipsilim", and "Worth the Wait", are all original compositions by Concepcion.

The album was certified 2× Platinum in the Philippines. The album has twelve tracks, three of which, "Not Like the Movies", "Takipsilim" and "After the End" were released as singles. "Not Like the Movies" and "After the End" were written by Jaye Muller and Ben Patton, "Breathe You" was composed by Jude Gitamondoc, while "Takipsilim", "Worth the Wait", "Magandang Umaga" were written by Concepcion.

== Singles and certification ==
The music video for "Not Like the Movies" was released on July 2, 2010.

Chart (2010–2011)	Peak position
AvEnZ Hit List of 24	8
Pinoy Myx Countdown	3
Myx Hit Chart	18
US Billboard Hot 100	98

The video for "Takipsilim" was released on August 31, 2010.

Region	Certification	Certified units/sales
Philippines PARI	2×Platinum	40,000

== Track listing ==
No.	Title	Writer(s)	Length
1.	"Not Like the Movies"	Jaye Muller and Ben Patton	3:38
2.	"Di Bale Na"	Allan Tongco	4:14
3.	"So Tell Me"	Louie Ocampo and Jingle Buena	2:50
4.	"Magandang Umaga"	KC Concepcion	3:52
5.	"Tayo Na"	Gerry Brandy/Rye Sarmiento	4:00
6.	"After the End"	Jaye Muller and Ben Patton	4:05
7.	"Takipsilim"	KC Concepcion	4:23
8.	"Breathe You"	Jude Gitamondoc	4:39
9.	"Girl Most Likely To"	Nina Ossoff, Dana Calitri, and Kathy Sommer	3:55
10.	"Naaantig Ako Sayo"	Pearlsha "Isha" Abubakar	4:03
11.	"Hulog"	Jimmy Bondoc	4:47
12.	"Worth the Wait"	KC Concepcion	4:55
Total length:			47:21
