= Almir Oda =

Macedonian footballer

Personal information
- Date of birth: 10 January 2004 (age 22)
- Height: 1.81 m (5 ft 11 in)
- Position: Midfielder

Team information
- Current team: Austria Klagenfurt
- Number: 21

Youth career
- 2010–2011: Gersthofer SV
- 2012–2013: Post SV Wien
- 2013–2020: Rapid Wien

Senior career*
| Years | Team | Apps | (Gls) |
| 2020–2024 | Rapid Wien II | 24 | (1) |
| 2024–2025 | Ballkani | 10 | (1) |
| 2025– | Austria Klagenfurt | 25 | (1) |

International career^{‡}
| 2019 | North Macedonia U15 | 4 | (0) |
| 2022– | Austria U19 | 3 | (0) |
- * Club domestic league appearances and goals as of 17 May 2026 ‡ National team caps and goals as of 14:34, 26 June 2025 (UTC)

Almir Oda (born 10 January 2004) is a professional footballer who plays as a midfielder for Austria Klagenfurt.

== Club career ==
In September 2024, Oda transferred to Kosovan side FC Ballkani for a reported fee of €125,000.

== International career ==
Oda has represented North Macedonia and Austria at youth international level.

== Career statistics ==
As of 9 November 2022.

Appearances and goals by club, season and competition
| Club | Season | League | | | Cup | | Other | | Total | |
| Club | Season | Division | Apps | Goals | Apps | Goals | Apps | Goals | Apps | Goals |
|---|---|---|---|---|---|---|---|---|---|---|
| Rapid Wien II | 2020–21 | 2. Liga | 10 | 0 | – | | 0 | 0 | 10 | 0 |
| Rapid Wien II | 2021–22 | 2. Liga | 0 | 0 | – | | 0 | 0 | 0 | 0 |
| Rapid Wien II | 2022–23 | 2. Liga | 25 | 1 | – | | 0 | 0 | 25 | 1 |
| Rapid Wien II | Total | | 35 | 1 | 0 | 0 | 0 | 0 | 35 | 1 |
| FC Ballkani | 2024–25 | Kosovar Superliga | 10 | 1 | 0 | 0 | 0 | 0 | 10 | 1 |
| Career total | | | 45 | 2 | 0 | 0 | 0 | 0 | 45 | 2 |
