= Mickey Perz =

Filipino-Austrian actor and dancer (born 1984)

- Born: Michael Richard Perz (Note: Mickey Perz was born in Austria. Thus, he does not possess his mother's maiden name.); June 1, 1984 (age 41); Vienna, Austria
- Occupations: Actor, Dancer
- Spouse: Gee-Ann Abrahan (m. 2016)
- Children: 2

Michael Richard Perz is a Filipino-Austrian dancer and occasional actor. He is under contract with ABS-CBN and Star Magic.

== Biography ==
Mickey Perz was born in Vienna, Austria, to an Austrian father and a Filipino mother from Alcala, Pangasinan. He completed his degree in business at HVA Didac in Europe and subsequently worked as a computer analyst for Unisys.

Perz auditioned for the second season of Pinoy Big Brother in Milan, Italy, and became one of the initial batch of housemates to enter the Big Brother House. He finished the competition as the runner-up to Beatriz Saw.

Following his time on Pinoy Big Brother, Perz and Saicy Aguila made guest appearances on ASAP. He also secured a lead role in the romance-fantasy series Love Spell, specifically in the multi-episodic story titled "Bumalaka, Bulalakaw, Boom!", where he starred alongside fellow PBB housemates Bodie Cruz and Gee-Ann Abrahan. In 2008, Perz had a minor role in the film When Love Begins.

Perz has been promoted as a regular cast member of ASAP. Since 2018, he has served as one of the choreography coaches for the P-pop group Bini, contributing to their training and development.

== Personal life ==
Perz was in a relationship with fellow-PBB Season 2 ex-housemate Gee-Ann Abrahan from 2009. They married in 2016 and have two children together.

== Filmography ==
=== Film ===
Year	Title	Role	Notes
2008	When Love Begins	Caleb	

=== Television ===
Year	Title	Role	Notes
2007	Pinoy Big Brother (Season 2)	Himself	2nd Big Placer
2007–2009	ASAP	Himself	Dancer/Host
2007	Love Spell Presents: Bumalaka, Bulalalkaw, Boom!	Carlo	
2008	Pinoy Big Brother: Teen Edition Plus	Himself	Choreographer
2011	Shoutout!	Himself	Coach
2018	Pinoy Big Brother: Otso	Himself	Judge, Weekly Task
2021	Pinoy Big Brother: Connect	Himself	Coach, Weekly Task
2023	It's Showtime	Himself	Judge, It's Showdown
2025	Rainbow Rumble	Himself	Contestant
2025	Maalaala Mo Kaya	Himself	Episode: Camera

== Accolades ==
Award	Year	Category	Recipient(s)	Result	Ref.
Aliw Awards	2025	Best Director for a Major Concert	Binified (with Jon R. Moll)	Nominated	
