= SK Austria Klagenfurt (2007) =

Association football club in Austria

Austria Klagenfurt
- Full name: Sportklub Austria Klagenfurt
- Nickname: Die Violetten (The Violets)
- Founded: 1920; 106 years ago
- Ground: Wörthersee Stadion
- Capacity: 32,000
- President: Herbert Matschek
- Manager: Harald Gärtner
- Head coach: Rolf Landerl
- League: Austrian Regionalliga South
- 2025–26: 2. Liga, 12th of 16 (relegated)
- Website: skaustriaklagenfurt.at
Home colours

Sportklub Austria Klagenfurt is an Austrian professional football club based in the Carinthian capital Klagenfurt. The club currently compete in the Austrian Regionalliga, following relegation from the 2. Liga in 2025–26.

== History ==
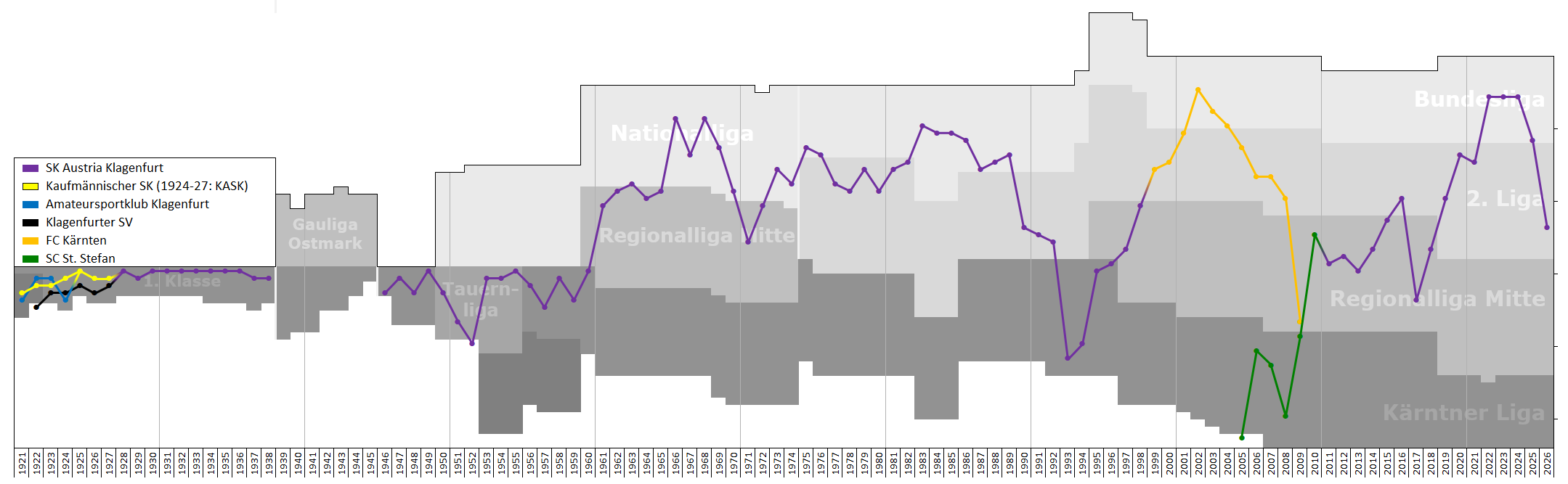
Historical chart of league performance of Austria Klagenfurt and their predecessor clubs

The emergence of the club marked the end of all efforts to establish an all-Carinthian team to play in the Austrian Football Bundesliga, pushed by the state's government under Jörg Haider. Austria Klagenfurt was already founded in 2007 ahead of the formation of the SK Austria Kärnten football club, but did not begin playing before SK Austria was dissolved in 2010 and it had merged with SC St. Stefan. SK Austria Klagenfurt plays its home matches at the Wörthersee Stadion. The club adopts the tradition of the former SK Austria Klagenfurt founded in 1920, renamed FC Kärnten in 1999, which was dissolved in 2009.

In 2020–21, Austria Klagenfurt finished in third place and earned promotion to the Austrian Bundesliga after defeating SKN St. Pölten 5–0 on aggregate in the promotion-relegation play-off. This was the club's first promotion to the top tier since being refounded in 2007.

== Honours ==
=== Domestic ===
==== League ====
- Austrian Regionalliga Central:
  - Winners (1): 2014–15

== Players ==
=== First team squad ===
As of 7 October 2025

Note: Flags indicate national team as defined under FIFA eligibility rules; some limited exceptions apply. Players may hold more than one non-FIFA nationality.

No.	Pos.	Nation	Player
1	GK	AUT	Manuel Kuttin
4	DF	BIH	Adem Mustafić
6	DF	AUT	Matteo Kitz
7	MF	AUT	Florian Jaritz
9	FW	GER	Naldinho
10	MF	SLO	Nik Marinšek
11	MF	AUT	Marc Andre Schmerböck
13	DF	AUT	Alexander Ranacher
14	DF	JPN	Rei Okada
16	MF	AUT	Sebastian Pschernig
17	MF	AUT	Christopher Wölbl
19	DF	AUT	Matthias Dollinger
20	DF	USA	Aidan Liu

No.	Pos.	Nation	Player
21	MF	AUT	Almir Oda
23	FW	BIH	Dino Delić
24	DF	CRO	Mario Matković (on loan from HNK Gorica)
25	GK	BIH	Adnan Kanurić
29	DF	CMR	Dimitrie Deumi-Nappi
33	MF	AUT	Leo Vielgut
37	MF	BIH	Armin Karić
44	MF	AUT	Elias Jandrisevits
57	GK	AUT	Alexander Turkin
77	FW	AUT	Denis Sinanović
99	FW	CRO	Bartol Barišić (on loan from DAC Dunajská Streda)

=== Out on loan ===
Note: Flags indicate national team as defined under FIFA eligibility rules; some limited exceptions apply. Players may hold more than one non-FIFA nationality.

No. / Pos. / Nation / Player	No. / Pos. / Nation / Player

== Head coach history ==
As of 22 June 2025

- (Austria) Walter Schoppitsch (2010–2011)
- (Austria) Rudolf Perz (2011)
- (Austria) Dietmar Thuller (2011–2012)
- (Austria) Günther Gorenzel-Simonitsch (2012)
- (Austria) Bruno Friesenbichler (2012–2013)
- (Austria) Heimo Vorderegger (2013)
- (Slovenia) Jože Prelogar (2013–2014)
- (Austria) Alexander Suppantschitsch (2014)
- (Germany) Manfred Bender (2014–2016)
- (Austria) Gerhard Fellner (2016–2017)
- (Austria) Franz Polanz (2017–2018)
- (Austria) Robert Micheu (2018–2020)
- (Austria) Peter Pacult (2020–2025)
- (Germany) Carsten Jancker (2025) interim
- (Austria) Rolf Landerl (2025–present)
