= Jaye Muller =

German internet entrepreneur and musician (born 1972)

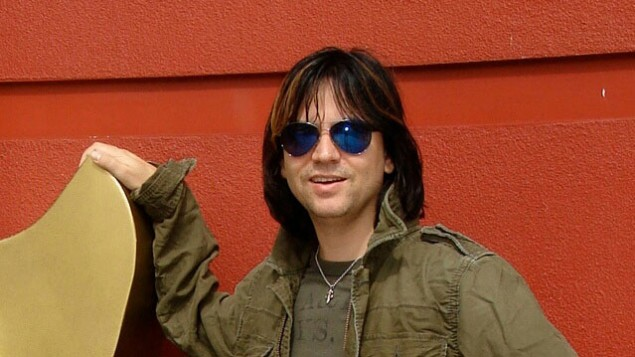
- Muller in LA, 2006

Background information
- Also known as: Jaye Muller, J., Count Jaye
- Born: Jens Müller; 23 December 1967; Berlin, German Democratic Republic
- Genres: Power Pop; Rock; Pop; Rap
- Occupations: Musician, singer-songwriter, record producer, entrepreneur, Co-Founder of j2 Global and Flasher Factory
- Instruments: Drums, guitar, bass, keyboards, vocals
- Years active: 1983–present
- Labels: PolyGram, A&M, PolyEast, Flasher Factory
- Member of: Count Jaye & The Hard Beats; Muller and Patton
- Formerly of: kleinkariert; die anderen; Flat Car Drive a Jet
- Website: countjayeandthehardbeats.bandcamp.com

Jaye Muller (born Jens Müller) is a German musician and Internet entrepreneur who performed under the name J. in the 1990s, and later in a duo named "Muller and Patton" with American musician Ben Patton and since 2015 under the name "Count Jaye". In 1992, he released his second solo album, We Are the Majority, which as of 1996 had sold 350,000 copies worldwide.

The NME once called him "A ludicrously talented maestro". Dave Marsh wrote in PLAYBOY "If there's a cure for Morrissey, this is it". Muller later co-founded, together with ex-Beach Boys Manager and lyricist Jack Rieley, the multi billion dollar internet company JFAX, later renamed to j2 Global (Nasdaq: JCOM), which initially allowed its users to receive fax and voicemail through their email, one of the first unified messaging systems. Muller and Rieley received a Patent for their invention (US6208638B1). Müller is no longer active in the company since 2004, but remained shareholder until 2016.

== Musical career ==
Born in East Berlin, Muller (then Müller) left East Germany for Paris, France in May 1990 after the fall of the Berlin Wall, but prior to German unification. Muller’s mother encouraged Jaye early on to take up music, in the form of classic guitar. She sent him to a local music school. Soon, Muller decided to also take up drums, bass, electric guitar and keyboards. Before leaving East Germany, Muller played as drummer in the East Berlin underground bands kleinkariert and later in the cult band die anderen in the late-1980s. Muller released his first solo album under the name J. just after the fall of the Berlin Wall, still under the East-German state record label AMIGA. In March 1992, he signed a contract with PolyGram in Paris, France.

Later that year, he used some of the money from this contract to start the weekly newsletter Germany Alert, which chronicled neo-Nazi activity and warned of human rights abuses in Germany at the time. Muller was nominated for the Reebok Human Right Award for this work. In 1992, J. was the victim of an armed home invasion and robbery by three thugs in his apartment. The robbers stole everything they could find pertaining to J.'s music, but no valuables. As of January 1993, the identities of the robbers were still unknown, but J. suspected they were neo-Nazis.

In January 1993, he released his second solo album, We Are the Majority, also in the United States on A&M Records. It had previously been released in France in October 1992. We Are the Majority was produced by Jack Rieley and mixed by John Leckie in Paris. In interviews in the early 90s, Muller expressed his views that the German government should somewhat restrict their people's freedom of speech to prevent violent fascism from experiencing a resurgence there, after the German Unification/Annexation of East Germany. He titled his album We Are the Majority to serve as a rallying cry to those who did not want to succumb to right-wing extremists again, but who felt they could do nothing about it. As he told the New York Times,

If you take all these minorities and put them together, we are the majority and can change everything. But we have to use the voice we have. We have to say that we want justice.

Müller released several other solo albums as well as albums in partnership as the duo "Muller and Patton". In 2015, Muller released a rock album named Bandages Cover The Looting under the artist name "Count Jaye & The Hard Beats" co-produced by Müller himself and industry veteran Morris D. Temple. This was followed up with Count Jaye & The Hard Beats' second release in 2019 named Hippo Russian Pickle Giant Blue Disguise. The first single's video of the album for the song "Big TV Star" caused some controversy as it portrayed the mainstream media as "Fake News". The album included collaborations by, among others, Adam Marsland, Roger Joseph Manning Jr. of Jellyfish, Nuno Bettencourt of Extreme, and Jack Rieley of the Beach Boys.

Muller released his third solo album as Count Jaye in late 2022 called You Belong To You on his label Flasher Factory, his fourth album Two States of Mind in April 2025 and his fifth studio album Jet Garbage Can in July 2026.

In 2018, Jaye and his wife, singer Michelle Omba, created the live music venue FLASHER FACTORY in the Philippines, for original music only, with great success. In 2020, the FLASHER FACTORY concept was being expanded into a fully fledged live recording studio in the Philippines.

== Critical reception ==
Fortune magazine wrote "Jaye Muller is a total babe". Steve Hochman of the Los Angeles Times called the music of We Are the Majority "a solid, one-man-band rap-rock collection reminiscent of the Dutch group Urban Dance Squad." In a 4-star (out of 5) review, AllMusic's Roch Parisien called the album "A disc that helps tear down that intimidating wall that separates rap and rock." Billboard wrote that "tracks like "Keep the Promise" and "Born on the Wrong Side of Town" "successfully incorporate elements of rap, rock, funk, and pop." The NME once called him "A ludicrously talented maestro". Dave Marsh wrote in PLAYBOY "If there's a cure for Morrissey, this is it".

Aron Gibson of BandRumors wrote about the first Count Jaye album: "Jaye Muller, the charismatic German songwriter, frontman and accidental tech pioneer who shot to fame in the early 90s with his seminal record We Are The Majority, is back..." "Muller, who had made waves across Europe on shows like MTV Europe and who also made a splash on American TV..." "The rocky but Beatlesque sounding songs are “raw and dirty” indeed but are also well crafted. The lack of autotuned vocals is apparent at times but welcome in today’s world of overproduced pop perfection."

== Business career ==
With his manager and former Beach Boys manager and lyricist, Jack Rieley, he went on to co-found the company JFAX Personal Telecom Inc. (later j2 Global) in 1995. The company allowed users to receive numerous types of media through email, including not only emails, but also faxes and voice messages. It did this by assigning each customer a phone number that received voice messages and faxes, then reroutes them to an email account. He got the idea for the company when he missed his faxes while traveling to different locations on tour. In 2000, Muller was nominated for the "Entrepreneur Of The Year Award". He later chose Richard Ressler to be the CEO of JFAX. Along with Jack Rieley, Muller is recognized as the inventor of the electronic fax and voice mail, later called "Unified Messaging".

== Discography ==
=== Studio albums as Count Jaye & the Hard Beats ===
- Bandages Cover The Looting (2015)
- Hippo Russian Pickle Giant Blue Disguise (2019)
- You Belong To You (2022)
- Two States of Mind (2025)
- Jet Garbage Can (2026)

=== Compilations ===
- Twentieth Century Jaye (2000)

=== With Muller and Patton ===
- Muller and Patton (2005)
- 5.05.05 LIVE (2005)
- Jonathan & Bailey (2006)
- The Jonathan & Bailey Companion (2007)
- Deep Gold (Music From The Motion Picture Deep Gold) (2008)
- The Best Of The Guards (2009)

=== As J. ===
- J. (AMIGA)(1989)
- We Are The Majority (Polygram/A&M)(1992)

=== As Producer and Songwriter ===
- Definition of Cool by Kelsey Adams (PolyEast) (Album) 2010
- Not Like The Movies by KC Concepcion (SONY) (Single) 2010
- After The End by KC Concepcion (SONY) (Single) 2010
- Bunny by Bunny (PolyEast) (Album) 2011
- Morissette at 14 Vol 1 & Vol 2 by Morissette Amon (Album) 2011, 2020, 2021
- Our Walk Is The Dance by Michelle Omba (Album) 2016
- Seasons of Emotions by Michelle Omba (EP) 2020
- Crazy Dreamer by Morefield (Album) 2025 To be released

=== As drummer with "die anderen" ===
- Global Minded (Buschfunk)(1988/2025)
- The Lapu-Lapu Tapes (1989/2025)
