= KC Concepcion (actress) =

Filipina actress & singer (born 1985)

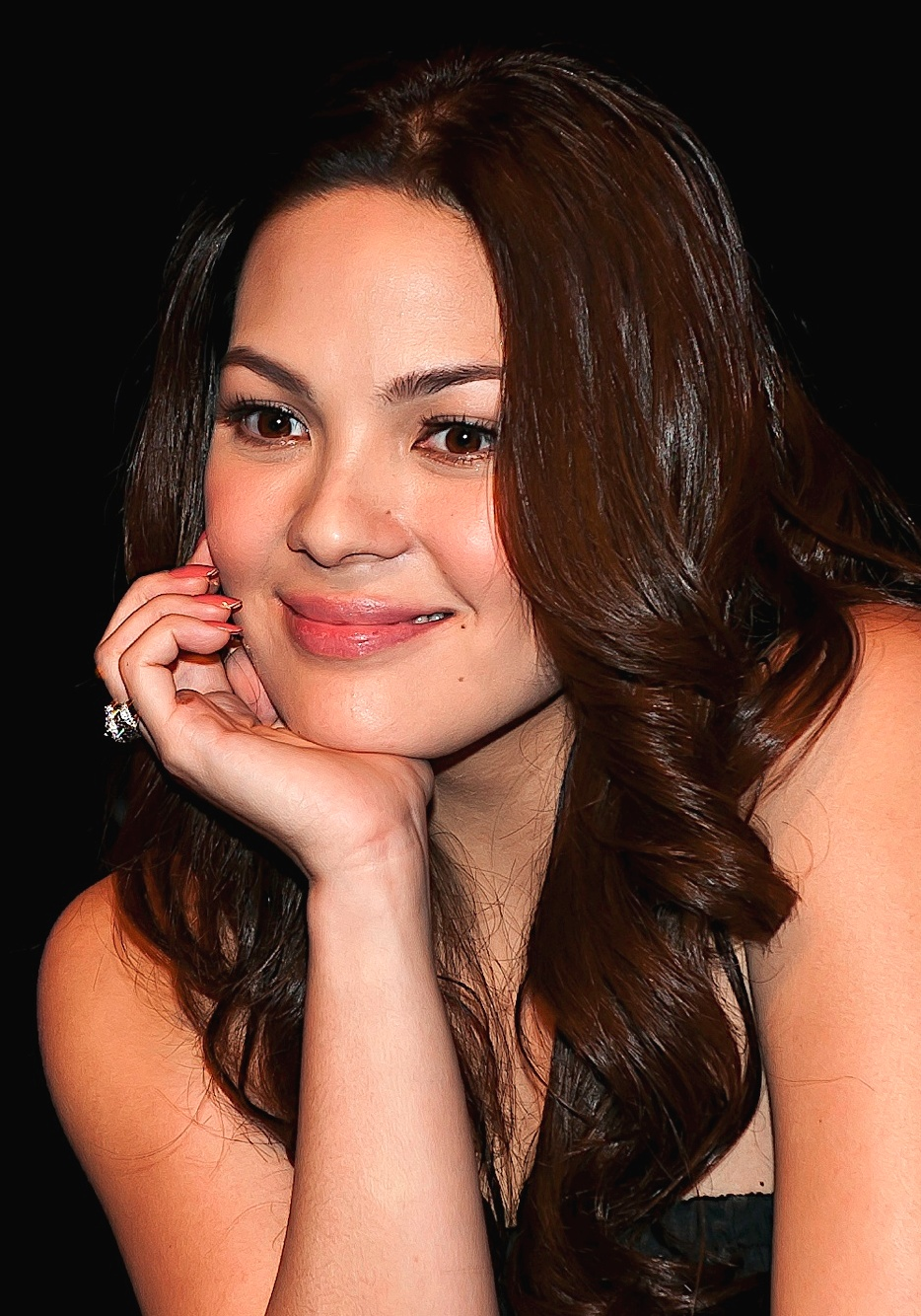
- Concepcion in 2010
- Born: Maria Kristina Cassandra Cuneta Concepcion; April 7, 1985 (age 41); Manila, Philippines
- Education: American University of Paris
- Occupations: Actress; singer; songwriter; model; host; dancer; humanitarian
- Years active: 1999–present
- Agent: Star Magic (2010–2011); Viva Artists Agency (2011–2016); Cornerstone Entertainment (2020–present)
- Works: Discography
- Parents: Gabby Concepcion (father); Sharon Cuneta (mother); Kiko Pangilinan (stepfather)
- Relatives: Pablo Cuneta (grandfather); Kakie (half-sister); Tito Sotto (granduncle); Helen Gamboa (great-aunt); Gian Sotto (uncle); Ciara Sotto (aunt); Lala Sotto (aunt); Gary Valenciano (step-uncle); Paolo Valenciano (step-cousin); Gab Valenciano (step-cousin); Kiana Valenciano (step-cousin); Gab Pangilinan (step-cousin); Donny Pangilinan (step-cousin); Josh Buizon (step-cousin)

Maria Kristina Cassandra "KC" Cuneta Concepcion (Tagalog pronunciation: [kuˈnɛtɐ kɔnsɛpˈʃon]; born April 7, 1985) is a Filipino actress, singer, dancer, television host, entrepreneur, socialite, and humanitarian. She has starred in films For The First Time (2008) and When I Met U (2009), and television series such as Lovers in Paris (2009), Huwag Ka Lang Mawawala (2013), and Ikaw Lamang (2014).

She is often dubbed as the "Mega Daughter", in reference to her mother Sharon Cuneta's honorific as the "Megastar". Concepcion is also known for her humanitarian work; she is the first Filipino Goodwill Ambassador of the United Nations' World Food Programme. She is also the ambassador of World Wide Fund for Nature (WWF) Philippines.

== Early life and education ==
Maria Kristina Cassandra Cuneta Concepcion was born on April 7, 1985, in Manila, Philippines. She is the daughter of singer-actress Sharon Cuneta and actor Gabby Concepcion. She reconnected with her father after thirteen years since her parents' annulment and his immigration to the United States in 1995.

She graduated grade school at Saint Pedro Poveda College in Mandaluyong. In 2003, she graduated high school from the International School Manila, and in 2007, graduated with a bachelor's degree in International Corporate Communications with a minor in Theatre Arts from the American University of Paris.

== Career ==
Concepcion made several guest appearances in her mother's concerts and television shows. In 2003, she became a product endorser both on television and in print ads. She started her career with global franchise MTV as an MTV Asia VJ.

As World Food Programme's Philippine ambassador, she shared the stage with Bill Clinton in 2008 to present the former US leader's foundation its commitment to feed more people in impoverish countries.

In 2009, she starred in the Philippine remake of her first primetime drama series, Lovers in Paris. In 2010, she returned to do a film with Star Cinema with her first movie with her father, Gabby Concepcion, for Father's Day, I'll Be There, directed by Maryo J. de los Reyes. In her 2010 studio album titled KC, she sang "Girl Most Likely To" by Skye Sweetnam from the soundtrack of Mattel's 2006 film The Barbie Diaries. In the same year, she joined Star Magic but after a year, she left and joined Viva Artist Agency, a talent management of Viva Entertainment.

On the April 11, 2010 episode of The Buzz, it was announced that Concepción had been chosen to be the replacement co-host after Ruffa Gutierrez's departure. She was also featured on the cover of Cosmopolitan Mexico. In 2011, she made another film with Star Cinema, a romantic, drama film Forever and a Day. Along with Agnez Mo and Jaclyn Victor, she sang in the 2011 SEA Games opening ceremony in Indonesia.

In 2012, she hosted the first and only season of The X Factor Philippines. She was also featured in USA's Complex Magazine as one of The 25 Sexiest International Actresses.

In 2013, she starred in her first lead antagonist role in Huwag Ka Lang Mawawala. In 2014, she starred a lead role as Natalia in the second season of the period drama series Ikaw Lamang. In 2015, she starred in an episode of ABS-CBN Christmas anthology series Give Love on Christmas. She was named one of GQ India's Hottest Actresses Around the World. In 2016, she returned as the host in Binibining Pilipinas 2016 with actor Xian Lim. She previously hosted the 2011 edition of Binibining Pilipinas five years ago with actor Derek Ramsay. She took a step back from showbiz for a while to focus as being the UN Ambassador of World Food Programme for Hunger and made an online shop website KC's Closet and reached ₱1,000,000 and being donated in Public School in Maguindanao.

In 2019, Concepcion was the first Filipina celebrity to represent global brand Shiseido as an ambassador and endorser.

In February 2020, she signed an exclusive management contract with Cornerstone Entertainment.

== Music ==
=== 2008–2009: a.k.a Cassandra ===
In 2008, Concepción released her first studio album on July 15, 2008, entitled "a.k.a Cassandra", on the Sony BMG Philippines label, which ranked number 1 based on the total album sales in all Odyssey Record Bar branches nationwide. In fact, 1,102 copies of the album were sold in all Odyssey branches alone. KC Concepción made Philippine music history with her lead single "Imposible" during that year. KC has the most number of music downloads in the Philippines in the same year, which marked 1 million downloads online. KC Concepción thought that she would just perform her newest single, "Doo Be Doo", on the noontime TV show Wowowee on ABS-CBN Channel 2 on November 15, 2008. However, she was surprised when she was given a Platinum Record Award for her album "a.k.a. Cassandra".

=== 2010–2011: KC ===
In 2010, Concepcion released her Second Studio Album entitled KC, KC ranked number 3 based on OPM charts, in Astrovision Stores the album KC reached number 1. KC was launched on ASAP XV. KC was released on March 24, 2010, under the Sony Music label. she also set KC Mall Tour to promote KC album.

== Acting ==
=== Theater ===
- 2003, The Little Mermaid
- 2005, Beauty and the Beast
- 2008, Katy, the Musical Concert

== Personal life ==
Concepcion had previously dated Rivermaya frontman Rico Blanco from 2003 to 2005. She also briefly dated director Lino Cayetano in 2007.

Her first highly publicized relationship was with actor Piolo Pascual. The two worked together in the 2009 television series Lovers In Paris. They ended their relationship in 2011.

She also dated actor Paulo Avelino, who confirmed their romance in a 2015 interview, having previously revealed that he had been courting her in 2013. They briefly worked in an episode of ABS-CBN's Christmas anthology series Give Love on Christmas. She also dated Filipino-American footballer Aly Borromeo from 2017 to 2018. The two reunited in October 2024 at one of Borromeo's football games.

Concepcion's last reported relationship is with Swiss businessman Steve Michael Wuethrich.

In May 2024, her mother, veteran actress Sharon Cuneta, publicly admitted that she and Concepcion were estranged, though Concepcion later posted a vlog where she paid tribute to Cuneta on Mother's Day, despite their reported estrangement.

== Filmography ==
=== Film ===
Year	Title	Role	Source
2008	For the First Time	Sophia Carmina Sandoval	
2009	When I Met U	Jenny	
2010	I'll Be There	Maxi/Mina dela Cerna	
2011	Forever and a Day	Raffy	
2013	Boy Golden: Shoot to Kill, the Arturo Porcuna Story	Marla "Marla Dy" De Guzman	
2023	Asian Persuasion	Avery Chua	

=== Television ===
Year	Title	Role
2003–2005	MTV Philippines	VJ
2006–2010	Sharon	Guest Host
2007	KC from Paris to Pinas (Documentary)	Herself
2007–2016	ASAP	Host/Performer
2008	I Am KC	Various Roles
2008	Maalaala Mo Kaya: Mansyon	Darlene
2009	May Bukas Pa	Abigail Lorraine "Abby" Cruz
2009	Lovers In Paris	Vivian Vizcarra
2010–2011	The Buzz	Host
2010	Wowowee	Guest Host
2010	Simply KC	Host
2010	Star Circle Quest: The Search for the Next Kiddie Superstars	Host
2011	Maalaala Mo Kaya: Piyesa	Angeline Quinto
2011	Binibining Pilipinas 2011	Host
2011	100 Days to Heaven	Tagabantay (street sweeper)
2011	Wansapanataym: Christmas Caroline	Caroline
2012	Maalaala Mo Kaya: Liham	Aurora
2012	The X Factor Philippines	Host
2012	28th PMPC Star Awards for Movies	Host
2013	Huwag Ka Lang Mawawala	Alexis Ganzon
2013–2016	Kris TV	Recurring Host
2014	Ikaw Lamang (Book 2)	Natalia Miravelez Hidalgo
2015	Give Love on Christmas: The Exchange Gift	Anna Cabrera
2015	41st Metro Manila Film Festival	Host
2016	Binibining Pilipinas 2016	Host

== Discography ==
=== Studio albums ===
- a.k.a Cassandra (2008)
- KC (2010)

=== Soundtrack ===
- For the First Time (2008)
- When I Met You (2009)
- Forever and a Day (2011)

== Awards and recognitions ==
Year	Award-Giving Body	Category	Work	Result
2008	1st Supreme to the Extreme Awards (Philippine Star)	Collaboration of the year with (Richard Gutierrez) with (Mark Nicdao)	For the First Time	Won
2008	1st Supreme to the Extreme Awards (Philippine Star)	Collaboration of the year with (Richard Gutierrez) with (Mark Nicdao)	—N/a	Nominated
2008	1st Supreme to the Extreme Awards (Philippine Star)	She Supreme Award for (Best Actress)		Won
2008	4th ASAP Pop Viewers' Choice Awards 2008	Pop Love Team with (Richard Gutierrez)	For the First Time	Nominated
2008	4th ASAP Pop Viewers' Choice Awards 2008	Pop Female Performance	For the First Time	Nominated
2008	4th ASAP Pop Viewers' Choice Awards 2008	Pop Movie	For the First Time	Nominated
2008	4th ASAP Pop Viewers' Choice Awards 2008	Pop Movie Theme Song	For the First Time	Nominated
2009	3rd Gawad Genio Awards	Best Film Debut Performer	For the First Time	Won
2009	25th PMPC Star Awards for Movies	New Movie Actress of the Year	For the First Time	Won
2009	6th ENPRESS Golden Screen Awards	Breakthrough Performance by an Actress	For the First Time	Won
2009	40th GMMSF Box-Office Entertainment Awards	Princess of Philippine Movies & TV	For the First Time	Won
2009	40th GMMSF Box-Office Entertainment Awards	Most Promising Female Star of Movies & TV		Won
2009	40th GMMSF Box-Office Entertainment Awards	New Female Recording Artist of the Year (Promising Singer)	A.k.a Cassandra	Won
2009	11th Gawad Pasado Awards	Pasadong Kabataan	—N/a	Won
2009	5th ASAP Pop Viewers' Choice Awards	Pop Female Fashionista	—N/a	Nominated
2011	25th PMPC Star Awards for TV	Best Talent Search Program Host	Star Circle Quest: The Search for the Next Kiddie Superstars	Nominated
2011	25th PMPC Star Awards for TV	Best Celebrity Talk Show Host	Simply KC	Nominated
2011	25th PMPC Star Awards for TV	Female Face of the Night	—N/a	Won
2012	28th PMPC Star Awards for Movies	Female Star of the Night	—N/a	Won
2012	Yahoo! OMG! Awards	Celebrity of the Year	—N/a	Nominated
2012	ASAP Pop Viewers Choice Awards	Pop Female Fashionista	—N/a	Nominated
2012	ASAP Pop Viewers Choice Awards	Pop Cover Girl	—N/a	Nominated
2012	30th Luna Awards	Best Actress	Forever and a Day	Nominated
2012	26th PMPC Star Awards for TV	Best Female TV Host	ASAP 2012	Nominated
2012	26th PMPC Star Awards for TV	Best Female Celebrity Showbiz-Oriented Talk Show Host	The Buzz	Nominated
2012	26th PMPC Star Awards for TV	Fabulous Body of the Night	—N/a	Won
2013	27th PMPC Star Awards for TV	Best Drama Supporting Actress	Huwag Ka Lang Mawawala	Won
2013	27th PMPC Star Awards for TV	Best Talent Search Program Host	The X-Factor Philippines	Nominated
2013	39th Metro Manila Film Festival	Best Festival Actress	Boy Golden: Shoot to Kill, the Arturo Porcuna Story	Nominated
2014	30th PMPC Star Awards for Movies	Movie Actress of the Year	Boy Golden: Shoot to Kill, the Arturo Porcuna Story	Won
2014	30th PMPC Star Awards for Movies	Darling of the Press	—N/a	Nominated
2014	62nd FAMAS Awards	Best Actress	Boy Golden: Shoot to Kill, the Arturo Porcuna Story	Won
2014	62nd FAMAS Awards	Female Star of the Night	—N/a	Won
2014	28th PMPC Star Awards for TV	Best Drama Supporting Actress	Ikaw Lamang	Won
2015	31st PMPC Star Awards for Movies	Darling of the Press	—N/a	Nominated
