= Rudolf Perz =

Austrian footballer and manager

Personal information
- Date of birth: 31 March 1972 (age 54)
- Place of birth: Austria
- Position: Midfielder

Youth career
  - 1989: Austria Klagenfurt

Senior career*
Years	Team	Apps	(Gls)
1989–1997	Austria Klagenfurt		
1997–1999	ASK Klagenfurt		
1999	WSG Wietersdorf		
1999–2000	FC St. Veit		
2000–2001	Friesacher AC		
2001–2003	FC Kärnten II		
2003–2005	SV Feldkirchen		
2005–2006	Annabichler SV		
2006–2007	WSG Wietersdorf		

Managerial career
- 2004–2008: SV Feldkirchen
- 2008–2010: FC Kärnten II
- 2011: SK Austria Klagenfurt
- 2011–: ASKÖ Köttmannsdorf
- * Club domestic league appearances and goals

Rudolf Perz (born 31 May 1972) is a former Austrian footballer and current manager. He currently manages ASKÖ Köttmannsdorf.
