= When I Met U =

2009 film by Joel Lamangan

And It All Began... When I Met U
- Promotional poster
- Directed by: Joel C. Lamangan
- Written by: Aloy Adlawan
- Produced by: Roselle Monteverde-Teo; Jose Mari Abacan
- Starring: Richard Gutierrez; KC Concepcion
- Cinematography: Mo Zee
- Edited by: Marya Ignacio
- Music by: Von de Guzman
- Production companies: Regal Entertainment; Regal Multimedia, Inc.; GMA Films
- Distributed by: Regal Films; GMA Pictures
- Release date: February 11, 2009
- Running time: 134 minutes
- Country: Philippines
- Languages: Filipino; English
- Box office: ₱80,000,000

And It All Began... When I Met U, or simply When I Met U, is a 2009 Filipino romantic comedy film directed by Joel Lamangan and starring Richard Gutierrez and KC Concepcion. The screenplay by Aloy Adlawan was written for Jose Javier Reyes to direct; Reyes later left, citing "creative difference". The title of the film is derived from an OPM song by Filipino musical group Apo Hiking Society called "When I Met You" which is also the film's official soundtrack. The film was produced by GMA Pictures.

The film premiered in the Philippines on February 11, 2009.

== Plot ==
Jenny (KC Concepcion) is an unpretentious mall promodizer searching for true love. A hopeless romantic, her quest leads her to Benjie (Richard Gutierrez), a cargo pilot who offers her the love she truly yearns. An unlikely romance begins when she hitches a ride with Benjie to attend a wedding in Palawan. On board, they openly show their dislike for each other but when the aircraft crashes in an unknown island, the two turn to each other for comfort and eventually resolve their differences.

== Cast ==
- Richard Gutierrez as Benjie
- KC Concepcion as Jenny
- Iya Villania as Tracy
- Alfred Vargas as Albert
- Tonton Gutierrez as Manny
- Cherry Pie Picache as Conching
- Tirso Cruz III as Kardo
- Perla Bautista as Stella / Albert's grandmother
- Chanda Romero as Sylvia
- Bearwin Meily as Tato
- Chariz Solomon as Kim
- Raquel Villavicencio as Beatrice / Tracy's mother
- Paolo Paraiso as Teddy
- Bubbles Paraiso as Bernice
- Ynez Veneracion as Cynthia
- Mav Lozano as Marcus
- Benedict Campos as pilot
- Luciano Son as Teddy's friend
- Patrick Breuder as Bernice's husband
- Tomiola Orebeta as Norman

== Soundtrack ==
When I Met U: Original Motion Picture Soundtrack

Soundtrack album by Various artists
- Released: January 2009
- Genre: Pop
- Label: Sony BMG

An 11-track official soundtrack for the film was released by Sony BMG. Here are the track-listing:

1. "When I Met You" by Apo Hiking Society
2. "Gusto Ko La-mang Sa Buhay" by Itchyworms
3. "BMD (Bring Me Down)" by Cueshé
4. "Gusto Na Kita" by 6 Cycle Mind
5. "Ikaw Pa Rin" by KC Concepcion
6. "Hintay" by Callalily
7. "Di Nakikita" by Roots of Nature
8. "Migraine" by Moonstar88
9. "Letter Day Story" by KC Concepcion
10. "Hanggang Dito Na Lang" by Jimmy Bondoc
11. "When I Met You" by KC Concepcion and Richard Gutierrez

== Release ==
=== Box office ===
The film opened in SM City North EDSA, the country's biggest theater earning an estimated ₱1.3M on the mall's cinema, second biggest opening day income of all the Filipino films shown at SM City North EDSA.

The film reportedly earned ₱10 million on its opening day in the cinemas nationwide and has grossed over ₱25 million on Valentine's Day. By February 27, 2009, the film has already grossed ₱80 million nationwide.

== Critical reception ==
The film received generally positive reviews from critics, obtaining a "B" grade from the Cinema Evaluation Board, although to Bong De Leon of Journal Online, "KC Concepcion and Richard Gutierrez can now heave a sigh of relief after their second movie together, 'When I Met U' made the grade. It deserves more than B." Mario E. Bautista of the People's Journal wrote, "it's way much better than their debut movie, 'For the First Time', thanks mainly to the well-written script of Aloy Adlawan". Bautista continues to rain praises acting, as well, "give winning performances". He concludes, claiming that "Richard has done many Valentine movies and this is certainly one of the best. It's as entertaining as his Valentine flick with Marian Rivera last year", referring to My Bestfriend's Girlfriend.

=== Parodies in Bubble Gang ===
- When I Hit U
- When I Met Woo (sometimes Removes Jacky)
- When I Met Argh

== See also ==
- For the First Time (2008 film)
