= Habang May Buhay =

- Title card
- Genre: Medical drama
- Created by: Enrico Santos
- Written by: Kay Conlu-Brondial; Gilbeys Sardea; Genesis L. Rodriguez; Bridgette Ann M. Rebuca; Obet DJ. Villela
- Directed by: Wenn V. Deramas
- Starring: Judy Ann Santos; Gladys Reyes; Derek Ramsay; Joem Bascon; Will Devaughn; Rio Locsin; Tetchie Agbayani; John Arcilla; Gina Alajar
- Opening theme: "Habang May Buhay" by Sharon Cuneta
- Composer: Wency Cornejo
- Country of origin: Philippines
- Original language: Filipino
- No. of episodes: 73

Production
- Executive producers: Carlo Katigbak; Cory Vidanes; Laurenti Dyogi; Ruel Bayani
- Producer: Grace Ann Bodegon-Casimsiman
- Production locations: Philippines; San Francisco, California, United States
- Production company: RSB Drama Unit (first subsidiary of Dreamscape Entertainment)

Original release
- Network: ABS-CBN
- Release: February 1 – May 14, 2010

Habang May Buhay (transl. While There is Life) is a 2010 Philippine television drama medical series broadcast by ABS-CBN. Directed by Wenn V. Deramas, it stars Judy Ann Santos, Gladys Reyes, Derek Ramsay, Joem Bascon, Will Devaughn, Rio Locsin, Tetchie Agbayani, John Arcilla, and Gina Alajar. It aired on the network's Primetime Bida line up and worldwide on TFC from February 1 to May 14, 2010 replacing Boys Over Flowers: One More Time. This also marks Santos and Reyes' reunion project in 13 years since they were together in Mara Clara.

The main storyline centered on Jane Alcantara-Briones, a strong-willed nurse who underwent family, career, and love challenges in both the Philippines and the United States.

== Plot ==
The series opens with a terrible vehicle accident. Luckily, Nurse Rose Caparas (Gina Alajar) and her young daughter Jane aka Jing-Jing, are there to aid those who are hurt from the terrible wreck. Rose has a secret affair with a general physician, Dr. Manuel Corpuz (John Arcilla); Manuel's wife, Ellen (Tetchie Agbayani), is aware of her husband's infidelity and tries to unravel the identity of her husband's mistress. Jane befriends Sam and his adopted brother Nathan, the two children of Manuel and Ellen. Sam instantly falls for Jane and apparently so does Nathan; the three of them form a bond and promise to be friends forever. However, an unexpected revelation breaks their pact. One fateful day, Nathan sees his father Manuel kissing Rose and catches this moment on film. Sam becomes furious upon seeing the photo of his father's unfaithfulness and quickly jumps to conclusions. Out of rage, Sam and Nathan confront Rose. Rose tries to explain herself but Sam accidentally pushes her off a cliff, setting the story in motion. Upon learning the crime their sons have committed, Ellen convinces Manuel to go abroad for their family's safety. Nathan, however, is unable to travel abroad due to complications with his adoption papers. This causes Nathan and Sam to get separated - with Sam traveling to America with his parents and Nathan running away. Nathan changes his name to Raon, in hopes of forgetting about his past. While in the states, Ellen and Manuel continue to have marital problems, forcing them to get separated. Later on, Ellen marries a rich doctor named Martin Briones and also inherits a stepdaughter, Clarissa Briones. As an act of embracing his new future and letting go of the tragedy of his past, Sam changes his name to David Briones. Meanwhile, Rose's accident leaves her mentally ill, leaving her and Jane no other choice but to live under the care of Rose's bitter cousin and Jane's aunt, Aida (Jobelle Salvador). After Rose attacks Aida, Aida decides to have Rose locked up in a mental institution, much to young Jane's chagrin. While under the care of her cruel aunt, Jane befriends Nonoy, a young boy who hopes to reconcile with his long lost mother. Jane and Nonoy would visit Rose at the mental institution at every chance they get, but another unfortunate event causes Jane's friendship with Nonoy to end abruptly. Jane, therefore, uses all the pain she had endured as her motivation to reach her dreams of becoming a nurse and to one day restore her mother.

Unbeknownst to Jane, her other aunt named Cora (Rio Locsin) is also looking for Jane and her mother in order to help them; as a promise to Jane's father. Cora sends money to Jane and Rose, ignorant of the former and the latter's situation with Aida. Instead of giving the money to Jane, Aida takes it for herself and her daughter, Grace. The all-grown-up Jane (Judy Ann Santos) finishes high school, and luckily she gets a college scholarship for the course she has always dreamed of—nursing. Since her wicked aunt opts to deprive her even with tertiary education, Jane has to work her way to college. Regularly, she still visits her mentally challenged mother in the mental institution. After an altercation with Grace over stolen money, Jane accidentally discovers all the letters her Aunt Cora had sent. Completely raged, Jane finally decides to move out from Aida's care and move in under Cora's wing. Now that everything is starting to fall into its rightful place, tragedy then strikes. On the day they are about to release Rose from the mental institution, the deranged lady runs off. Jane eventually graduates and becomes the nurse that she hoped she would be. As a nurse, Jane is very dedicated, strong-willed, and selfless. However, all of this is challenged when she meets David Briones (Derek Ramsay) - the arrogant and womanizing owner of the hospital Jane works for. Both Jane and David are unaware of each other's true identity. Meanwhile, Raon (Joem Bascon), finds Rose and does everything in his power to try to restore her back to her normal state. Overtime, Jane and David grow close, despite their constant annoyance of one another. Though none are willing to admit it, Jane and David have fallen in love with one another but are still ignorant from the truth. Trouble, however, comes in the form of Clarissa Briones (Gladys Reyes), David's stepsister who also harbors deep romantic feelings for David. In his attempt to heal Rose, Raon runs into his father Manuel at a community hospital but does not reveal his true identity to the doctor. Manuel and Rose are reunited, with Manuel acting as Rose's doctor. Jane and David become an official couple, but Clarissa continues with her constant meddling.

Raon learns that Jane is Rose's daughter and therefore hatches a plan to reunite the mother and daughter who were torn apart by tragedy. Now that two are reunited, Jane finds Manuel at the hospital and tries to talk to him. However, the troubled doctor still does not have the courage to face Jane and does everything he can to hide from her until the time is right. On the other hand, David finally discovers Jane's true identity after he pays a visit to Jane's mother (not knowing that her mother is Rose). Upon seeing David, Rose tells Jane that David is the one that pushed her down the cliff. Jane dismisses the truth by telling her mother that the person responsible is Sam, not David. David, now hurting from what he discovered, tries to find a way to tell Jane his secret: That he is in fact Sam and the one responsible for her mother's accident. Clarissa, on the other hand, is still trying to come up with plans to rid Jane from David's life.

David's mother, Ellen, becomes aware of David's relationship with Jane and opposes this, all thanks to Clarissa. Ellen, therefore, returns to the Philippines to take matters into her own hands. David tells his mother that Jane is Rose's daughter and that she mustn't do anything to jeopardize their relationship because if she does, David will never speak to her again. Clarissa overhears their conversation and later threatens Ellen that she will expose the truth to Jane; Ellen retracts by telling Clarissa that she, too, will expose something from Clarissa's past that will put her in jail if she ever tells Jane the truth. Jane's friend, Nonoy (Will Devaughn), suddenly returns to Jane's life, causing much jealousy within David. Happy to be reunited with her long lost friend, Jane is unaware of the fact that Nonoy is sick. Ellen is also reunited with Manuel, after a run-in with each other at the community hospital. Manuel wants nothing more to do with his ex-wife, but Ellen plans on winning back Manuel. Ellen soon discovers that Rose is still alive after following Manuel on his way to see Rose. To ensure that nothing can get in between her and Manuel, Ellen kidnaps Rose and takes her somewhere far away where Manuel won't be able to reach her.

== Cast and characters ==
=== Main cast ===
- Judy Ann Santos as Jane C. Alcantara-Briones and Adult Mary Jane A. Briones — Jane grew up with only her mother to raise and guide her, and all her life she had but one dream— to be a nurse just like her mom. But fate would test her strength and determination when her mother met an accident due to the people she trusted. Jane then promises herself to search for the truth and hopefully find justice for what happened to her mother and continue her lifelong dream, but along the way Jane will find love instead. But what if the one she truly loves is also the one causing her suffering? How long will she be able to continue to fight for her mother? Can love heal the wounds of a broken heart? In the end, she dies after being shot by Clarissa.
- Gladys Reyes as Dr. Clarissa C. Briones — The stepsister of David and the stepdaughter of Ellen. Dr. Clarissa Briones is a general surgeon and is harboring a secret love for David. As the series goes on, Clarissa has become a murderer and attempts to murder everyone closest to Jane before killing her. Clarissa was sent to jail for her crimes but was later released. Clarissa attempts to finish what she started and kidnaps Jane's daughter to lure Jane to her. In the end, Clarissa attempted to kill Nathan but he pushed her into an electrical cable and was electrocuted to death.
- Derek Ramsay as Samuel David "Sam" Briones / David C. Briones — Because of the tragedy of his past, he was forced to forget where he came from and change his overall identity. On his return, he will meet a woman who will challenge him. What he doesn't know, that this time, he will once again be reunited with his childhood friend who he have wronged before. Can he owe up to his mistakes? Will he do this even if doing this could make him lose the woman he truly loves?

=== Supporting cast ===
- Joem Bascon as Nathaniel "Nathan" Corpuz / Raon — He took responsibility for the mistake of his brother. He will again come across Rose. Nathan will do everything to restore her back to health to make his mistake up to his childhood friend Jane. But what if in the end Jane still won't choose him? How long can he give way for the one he loves?
- Will Devaughn as Patrick "Nonoy" Esteban — The best friend and protector of Jane since they were young but they suddenly got separated. On his return as a patient of Jane, will he be able to finally admit his feelings towards the woman he has loved all these years? He later died due to brain cancer.
- Rio Locsin as Cora Alcantara — The auntie of Jane. Cora is a nurse of principle and courage and a true friend to Jane. She thinks of nothing else but Jane's benefits. How long can she be devoted to Jane? Up to what extent would she be willing to do to protect Jane?
- Tetchie Agbayani as Ellen Corpuz — The mother of Sam and adoptive mother of Nathan. She came from a rich and very influential family. Ellen won't allow anyone or anything to come between her and her husband Manuel. She was later killed by Clarissa when she betrayed her in order to tell the authorities of her evil deeds. Her death was finally avenged when Nathan kills Clarissa
- John Arcilla as Dr. Manuel Corpuz — The father of Sam and adoptive father of Nathan. Dr. Corpuz is a general physician and family man. He chose his ambition and dream to become a successful doctor with his wife over the woman he once really loved. He was later killed by Clarissa when he defended Rose. His death was finally avenged when Nathan kills Clarissa.
- Gina Alajar as Rose Caparas-Alcantara — The widowed mother of Jane. Rose raised Jane by herself alone even with difficulty. She's a nurse whom Jane looks up to and gets her inspiration. She will be thrust into a tragedy all because of love... and mistakes. Will she be able to finally correct the mistakes of the past?
- Dominic Roque as Mark Alcantara - Cora's son and Jane's cousin who is killed by Clarissa by a bomb for the revenge of Jane. His death is finally an advantage when Nathan kills Clarissa.

=== Extended cast ===
- Gee-Ann Abrahan as Tammy
- Jaymee Joaquin as Shaira
- Marc Abaya as King
- Kian Kazemi as Milo

=== Guest cast ===
- Mariel Pamintuan as young Jane Alcantara
- John Manalo as young Sam
- Paul Salas as young Nathan
- Makisig Morales as young Nonoy
- Cheska Billones as young Mary Jane Briones

=== Special participation ===
- Melanie Marquez as Victoria Samaniego
- Martin del Rosario as Justin Esteban
- Lloyd Samartino as Martin Briones
- Shamaine Centenera-Buencamino as Rowena Esteban
- Michael de Mesa as Mayor Antonio Parella
- William Martinez as Ben Alcantara
- DJ Durano as Rod Chiu
- Mickey Ferriols as Dr. Jamarilla Agustin
- Ina Feleo as Fiona Enriquez
- Ejay Falcon as Nenok
- Allan Paule as Caloy
- Danilo Barrios as Lando
- Jobelle Salvador as Aida
- Kathleen Hermosa as Grace
- Sid Lucero as Francis
- Dang Cruz as Norma
- Cai Cortez as Debbie
- Matet de Leon as Yolly
- John Wayne Sace as Yolly's son
- Gerard Pizzaras as Pilo
- Karla Estrada as Bonna
- Bangs Garcia as Mindy Melendez
- Nikki Bacolod as Julie
- Jeffrey Santos as Dr. Richard
- Ana Capri as an inmate
- Minco Fabregas as Clarissa's attorney

== Production ==
The project was announced in mid-2007. Production started January 2008 under the direction of Andoy Ranay, Mark Meily, and John Lazatin. The series had a working title Himala but the management did not want the viewers to think that it was a remake of the Nora Aunor movie Himala. The title was then changed to Humingi Ako Sa Langit. On ABS-CBN's Trade Show, '08 Accelerate!, a trailer of the show was released. It was also announced that the show will be part of ABS-CBN's 2009 new shows line up, but ABS-CBN management then decided to scratch the whole project and start over again. After having seven different directors, new production started middle of 2009 under the direction of Wenn Deramas. In November 2009, ABS-CBN held its trade show for its upcoming programs for 2010 where it was announced that Habang May Buhay will begin airing during the first quarter of 2010.

=== Production crew ===
- Director: Wenn V. Deramas
- Executive in Charge of Production: Enrico Santos
- Executive in Charge of Creative: Ruel S. Bayani
- Production Manager: Rizza Ebriega
- Executive Producer: Grace Ann Casimsiman
- Headwriter: Francis Xavier Pasion, Agnes Gagelonia
- Writers: Shugo Praico, Lobert Villela, Bridgette Rebuca, Genesis Rodriguez, Maribel Ilag

=== Launch ===
Habang May Buhay was launched as one of the ABS-CBN offerings for the 60th celebration of Filipino Soap Opera ("Ika-60 taon ng Pinoy Soap Opera"), together with series such as Rubi, Kung Tayo'y Magkakalayo, Tanging Yaman, Kokey at Ako, Magkano ang Iyong Dangal?, Agua Bendita and a series of Precious Hearts Romances Presents seasonal installments. The shows were launched during the ABS-CBN Trade Launch for the first quarter of 2010, entitled "Bagong Simula" (New Beginning).

== Theme song ==
The show's title was derived from its theme song, "Habang May Buhay" sung by Sharon Cuneta. The song was composed and originally sung by Wency Cornejo, who recorded it with his band Afterimage.

== Trivia ==
- It won 4 Awards
- Became Gladys Reyes and Judy Ann Santos' comeback as a tandem.
- it was originally named Humingi Ako Sa Langit in 2008 when it was shot but decided to fix the program with same plot new cast and new drama because it would open as the 1st Quarter of 2010's 60th Year Of Philippine Drama Campaign.

== See also ==
- List of programs broadcast by ABS-CBN
- List of ABS-CBN Studios original drama series
