= For the First Time (2008 film) =

- Theatrical movie poster
- Directed by: Bb. Joyce Bernal
- Written by: Vanessa R. Valdez
- Produced by: Marizel Samson-Martinez
- Starring: Richard Gutierrez; KC Concepcion
- Cinematography: Shayne Sarte
- Edited by: Marya Ignacio
- Music by: Jessie Lasaten
- Production company: Star Cinema
- Distributed by: ABS-CBN Film Productions
- Release date: August 27, 2008
- Countries: Philippines; Greece
- Languages: Filipino; Greek

For the First Time is a 2008 Philippine romantic comedy-drama film directed by Joyce Bernal from a screenplay by Vanessa R. Valdez. Shot mainly in the Philippines and Santorini, Greece, the film stars Richard Gutierrez and KC Concepcion.

Produced and distributed by ABS-CBN Film Productions, the film was theatrically released on August 27, 2008.

== Plot ==
Seth is a rich, impulsive playboy who runs away from serious relationships and doesn't give much thought to the women he goes out with. Sophia is a prude, ambitious girl who feels responsible for the tragedy she once encountered, and with a scar to constantly remind her of this unfortunate experience.

When the two accidentally meet in Santorini, their differences do not stop them from spending an unforgettable summer together — that is, until Seth runs away again, scared of the unusual feeling that is happening within him.

Seth soon realizes his mistake and comes back to Manila to try his best to regain Pia's affection. Conflicts in land ownership and businesses of their parents are now part of a wall that is growing between them.

== Cast and characters ==
- Richard Gutierrez as Seth Alexander Villaraza
- KC Concepcion as Sophia Carmina Sandoval
- Jake Cuenca as Josh
- Candy Pangilinan as Manang Josie
- Beatriz Saw as Selene
- Carla Humphries as Marianne
- Nor Domingo as Benjo
- Denise Laurel as Billie
- Phillip Salvador as Santiago Sandoval
- Geoff Eigenmann as Tristan
- Eddie Gutierrez as Hector Villaraza
- Pilar Pilapil as Sylvia Villaraza
- TJ Trinidad as Greg Sandoval
- Ana Roces as Abby Villaraza
- Bobby Andrews as Mike Villaraza
- Bruce Quebral as Migs
- Gee-Ann Abrahan as Michelle
- Bubbles Paraiso as Issa Villaraza

== Production ==
Under director Joyce Bernal, Irene Villamor served as assistant director while Antoinette Jadaone served as script continuity supervisor.

== Accolades ==
Year	Award-giving body	Category	Recipient	Result
2009	GMMSF Box-Office Entertainment Awards	Prince of Philippine Movies & TV	Richard Gutierrez	Won
2009	GMMSF Box-Office Entertainment Awards	Princess of Philippine Movies & TV	KC Concepcion	Won

== See also ==
- When I Met U
