= A.k.a Cassandra =

a.k.a Cassandra

Studio album by KC Concepcion
- Released: June 3, 2008
- Recorded: 2008
- Genre: Pop
- Length: 47:21
- Labels: Musiko Records; Sony BMG Music Entertainment (Philippines), Inc.

KC Concepcion chronology
a.k.a Cassandra (2008)	KC (2010)

Singles from a.k.a Cassandra
- 1. "Imposible" Released: July 24, 2008; 2. "Doo Be Doo" Released: November 15, 2008

a.k.a Cassandra is the debut studio album by Filipina singer and actress, KC Concepcion. It was released on June 3, 2008, under Musiko Records and Sony BMG Music Entertainment (Philippines), Inc.. It contains 11 cuts — five are original pieces, five are revivals, and one is an adaptation. The album was certified Platinum in Philippines with 25,000 copies sold in 2008.

== Singles ==
"Imposible" was the first single off the album. "Doo Be Doo" was the second single off of the album. The song is a mix of English and Tagalog.

== Track listing ==
No.	Title	Writer(s)	Length
1.	"I Melt with You"	Modern English	4:24
2.	"Imposible"		4:32
3.	"Doo Be Doo (Gita Gutawa cover)"	Joey De Leon (translated)	3:42
4.	"An Updated Version Of Me"		4:19
5.	"Ngiti Lang"	Ryan Cayabyab	3:38
6.	"Umbrella"		4:31
7.	"I Just Can't Get Enough"	Depeche Mode	4:12
8.	"Imagine"		3:51
9.	"Agila (Haring Ibon)"		4:51
10.	"It Must Have Been Love"		4:24
11.	"Breathe You"	Jason Dawson	4:10
12.	"Sabihin Mo Na Sana (album cut)"		4:34
13.	"For the First Time (album cut)"		4:22
14.	"Breathe (album cut)"	Raymund Marasigan	4:10

== Certifications ==
Country	Provider	Certification	Sales	Odyssey Sales
Philippines	PARI	Platinum	20,000+	1,102+
