= Bea Saw =

Filipino actress

Beatriz Saw-Tan
- Born: Maria Beatriz Imperial Saw; November 17, 1985 (age 40); Baao, Camarines Sur, Philippines
- Education: Ateneo de Naga University
- Occupation: Actress
- Years active: 2007–2017
- Agent: Star Magic (2007–2017)
- Spouse: Rocky Tan (m. 2012)
- Children: 2

Maria Beatriz Imperial Saw-Tan (born November 17, 1985), is a Filipino actress of Taiwanese descent. She won the second season of Pinoy Big Brother.

On June 30, 2007 (day 126) after garnering about 1.5 million votes, or 30.29% of the total number of votes, Saw was proclaimed as the Big Winner of Pinoy Big Brother. Her record erased Kim Chiu's record for the most votes earned by a Big Winner. She received a million pesos, and prizes including a house and lot, a kitchen showcase, a new car, a business franchise and an Asian package tour for two.

== Personal life ==
In January 2012, Saw married her longtime boyfriend Rock Tan. She announced on Pinoy Big Brother: Unlimited that she is pregnant with her first child. She is now a mother of two daughters and one son.

== Filmography ==
=== Film ===
Year	Title	Role
2007	One More Chance	Angeline "Anj" Tan
2008	For the First Time	Selene
2010	My Amnesia Girl	Peachy
2010	Ang Tanging Ina Mo (Last na 'To!)	Cameo/Segment Producer
2012	My Cactus Heart	Arianna
2013	Status: It's Complicated	Julie
2015	A Second Chance	Angeline "Anj" Tan
2017	The Ghost Bride	Achi

=== Television ===
Year	Title	Role
2007	Pinoy Big Brother: Season 2	Herself/Housemate/Big Winner
2007	ASAP	Herself/Guest Performer
2007	The Buzz	Herself/Guest
2007–2008	Pinoy Big Brother: Celebrity Edition 2	Herself/host
2008	Lobo	Mitch
2008	Lipgloss	Mayumi Castro
2009	Ang Lalaking Nagmahal Sa Akin	Helen
2009–2010	My Cheating Heart	Pia
2010	High Five: The Big Five Years of Pinoy Big Brother	Herself
2010	Magkaribal	Kate Delovieres
2010	Maalaala Mo Kaya: Gitara	Dolores
2011	Your Song Presents Kim: If I Gave You My Heart	Elaine
2011	Mana Po	Sugar
2011	Maalaala Mo Kaya: Ice Cream	Jaypee's Wife
2011	Maalaala Mo Kaya: Kape	Monette
2011–2012	My Binondo Girl	Athea Demides
2012	Pinoy Big Brother: Unlimited	Houseguest/Kuya's Fairy Godmother
2013	Toda Max	Herself/Guest
2013–2014	Annaliza	Ms. Fontanilla
2015	Pinoy Big Brother: 737	Herself/Special Guest
2016	We Will Survive	Ana Fe Adlao

Preceded by Kim Chiu	Pinoy Big Brother; Big Winner; 2007	Succeeded by Ruben Gonzaga
Preceded by Nene Tamayo	Pinoy Big Brother Regular Season; Big Winner; 2007	Succeeded by Melai Cantiveros
