= List of A2Z original programming =

A2Z is a free-to-air broadcast television network in the Philippines owned by ZOE Broadcasting Network and ABS-CBN Corporation. The following is a list of all original television programming by A2Z since it began its television operations on October 10, 2020.

== Current original programming ==
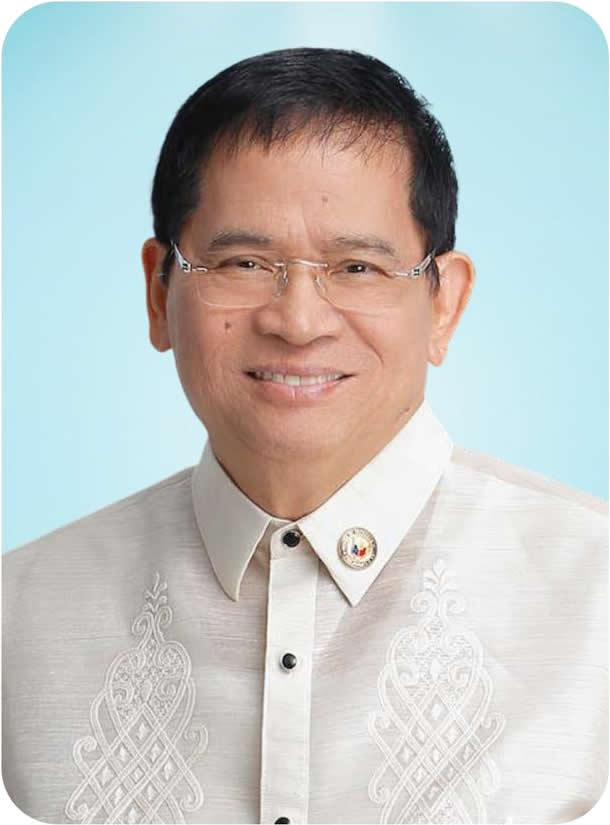
Eddie Villanueva, host of the talk show Diyos at Bayan and the religious shows, Bro. Eddie Villanueva Classics and Jesus the Healer.

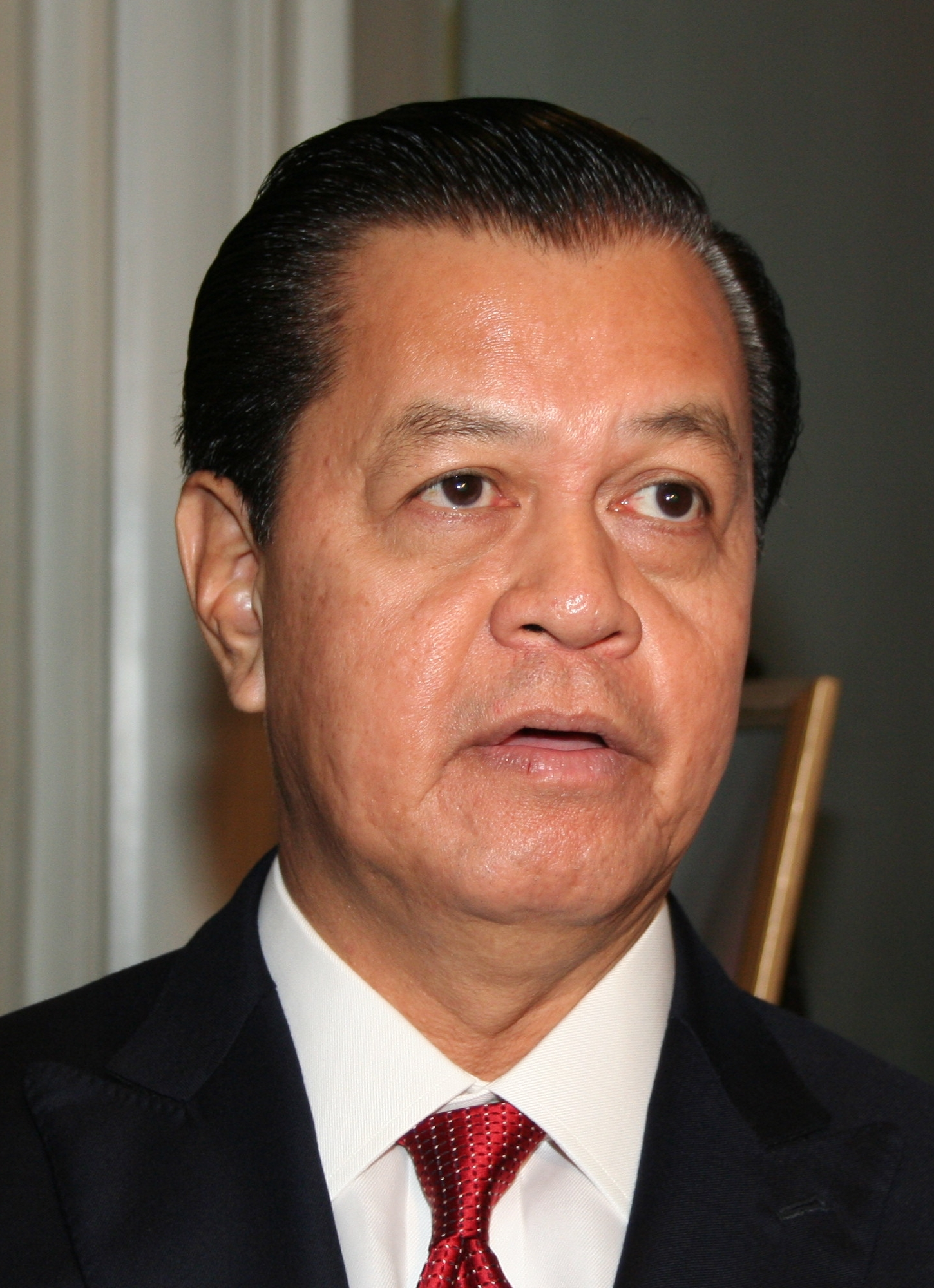
Noli de Castro, anchor of the newscast TV Patrol.

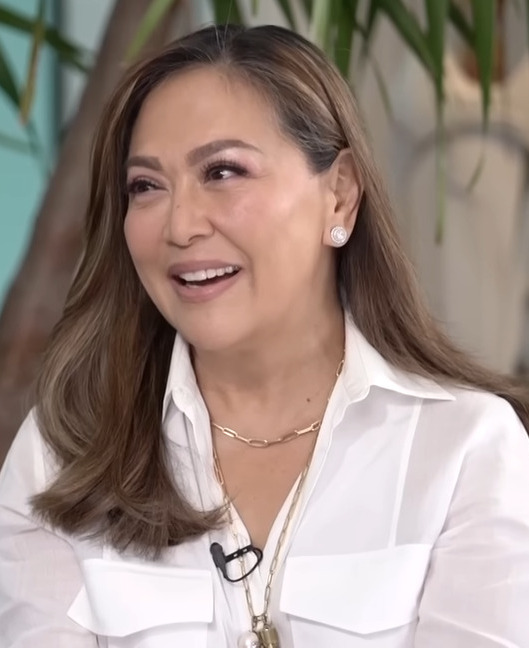
Karen Davila, host of the news magazine show My Puhunan: Kaya Mo! and anchor of the newscast TV Patrol.

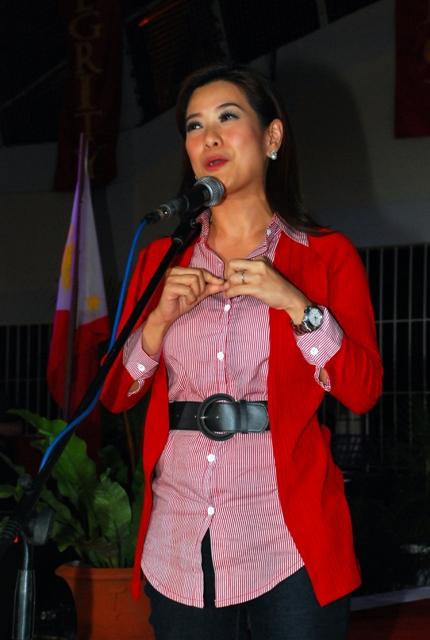
Bernadette Sembrano, host of the news magazine show Tao Po! and anchor of the newscast TV Patrol.

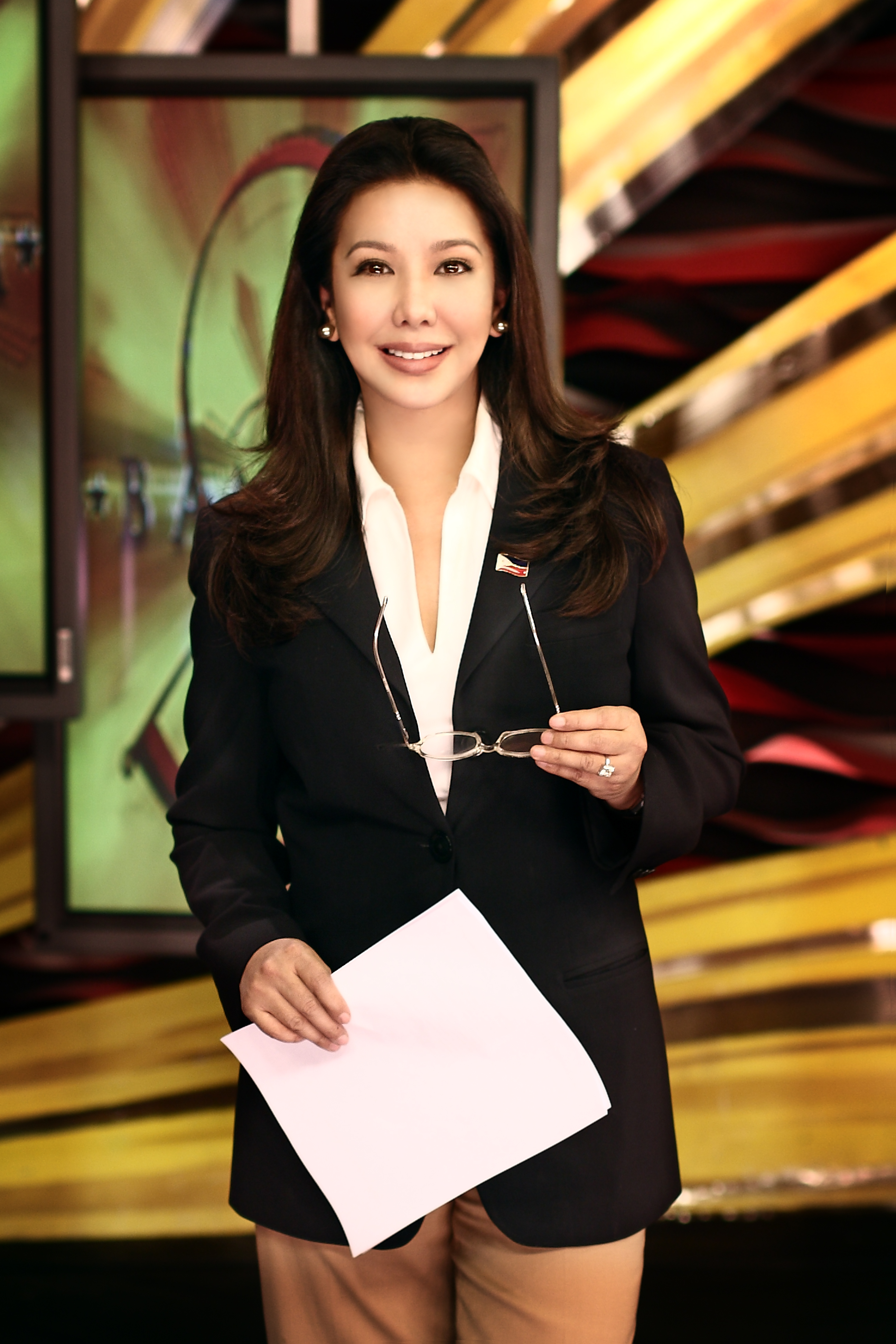
Korina Sanchez, host of the news magazine show Rated Korina.

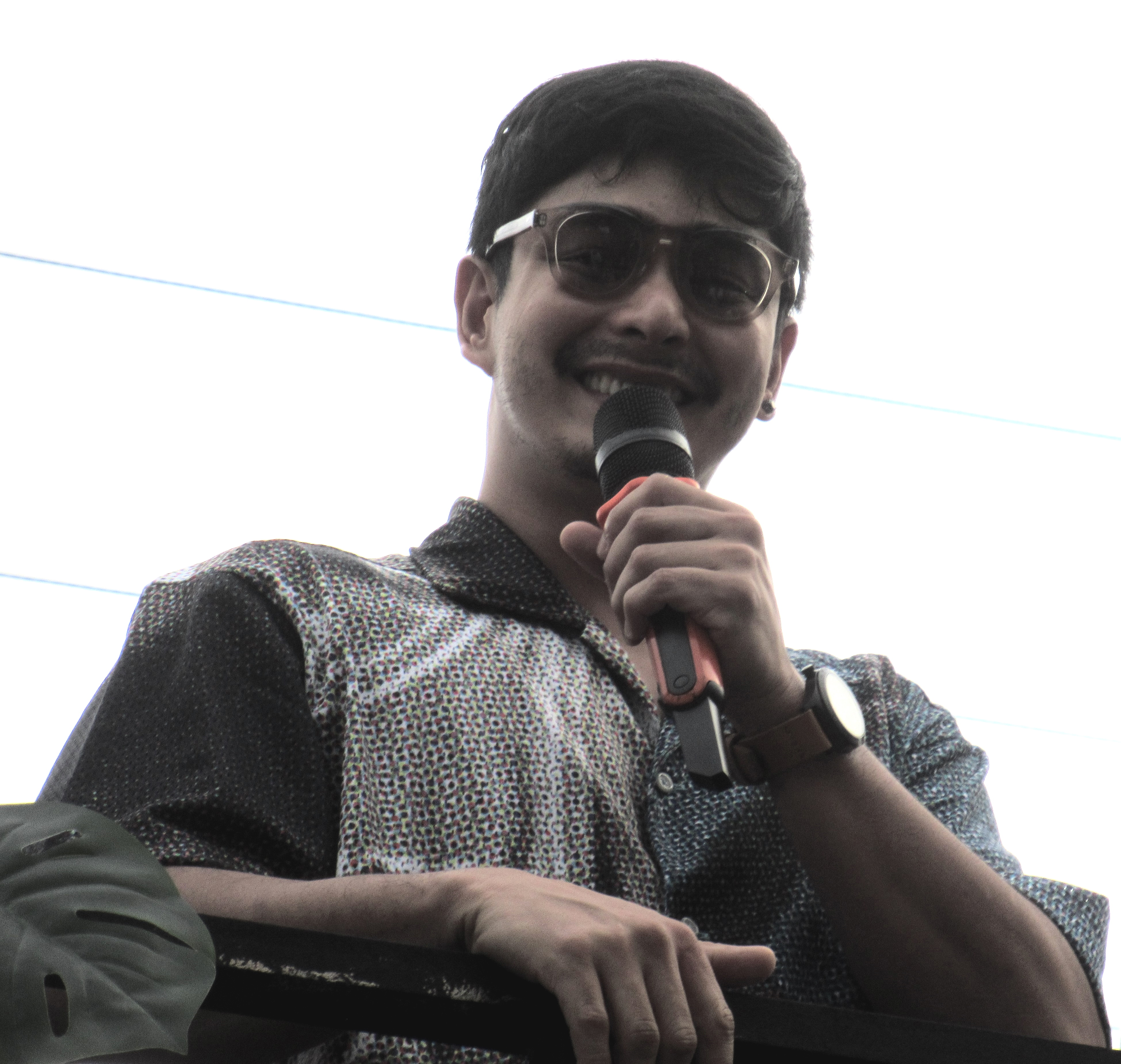
Coco Martin, lead actor of the drama series Coco Martin's Sigabo.

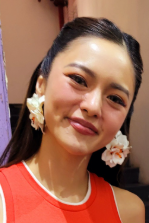
Kim Chiu, hosts of the variety shows It's Showtime and ASAP XP.

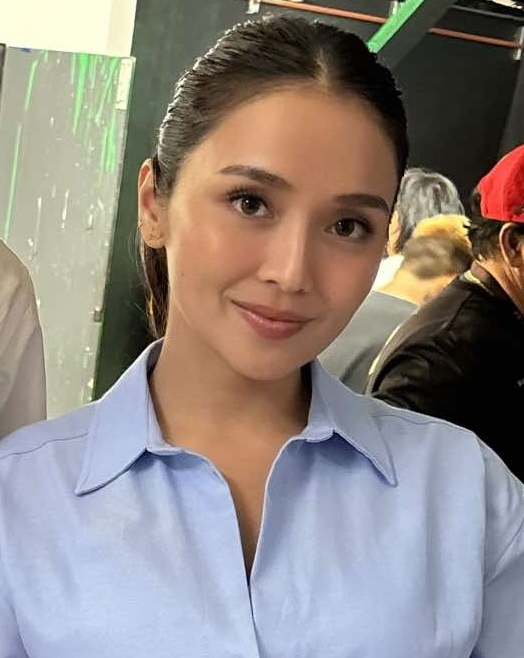
Kathryn Bernardo, lead actress of the drama series Someone, Someday.

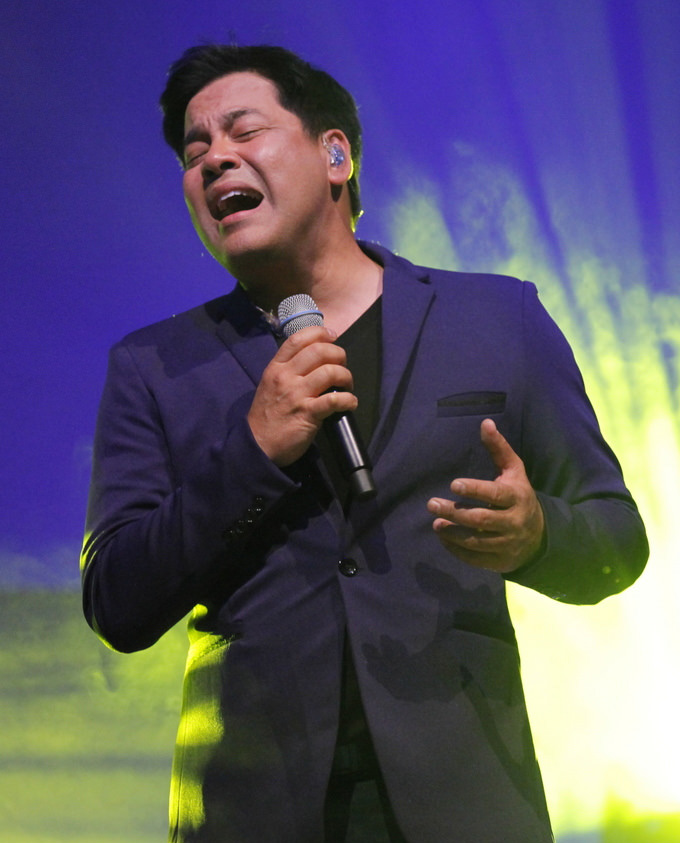
Martin Nievera, hosts of the variety show ASAP XP.

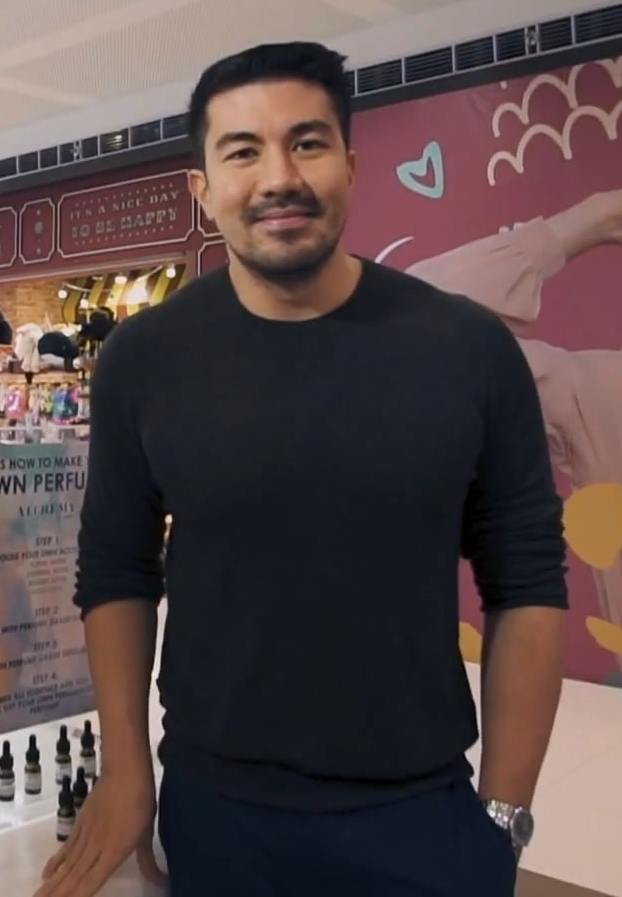
Luis Manzano, host of the game show Kapamilya Deal or No Deal.

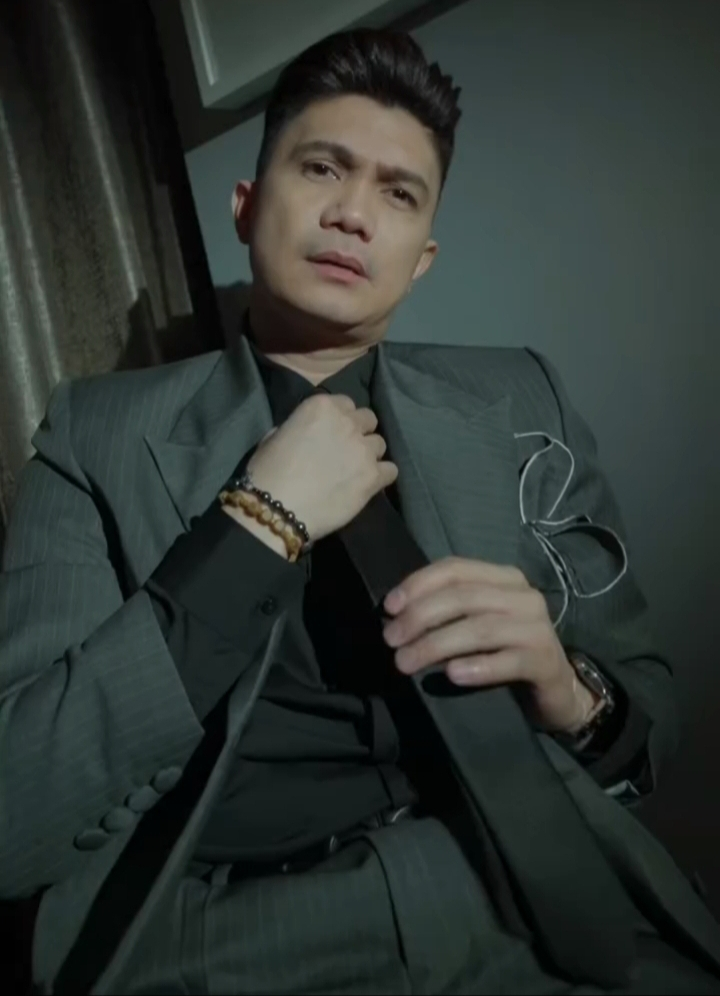
Vhong Navarro, host of the variety show It's Showtime.

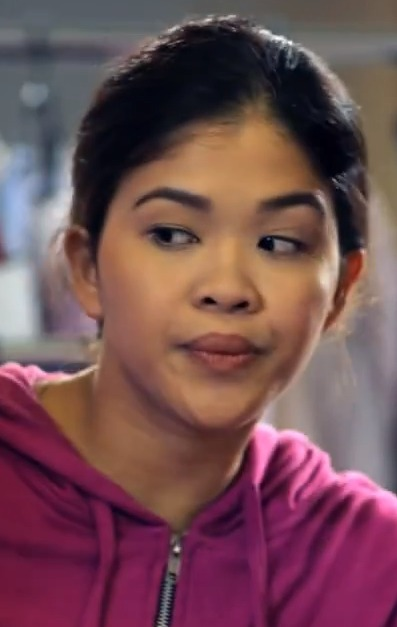
Melai Cantiveros, hosts of the talk shows Kuan on One and Magandang Buhay.

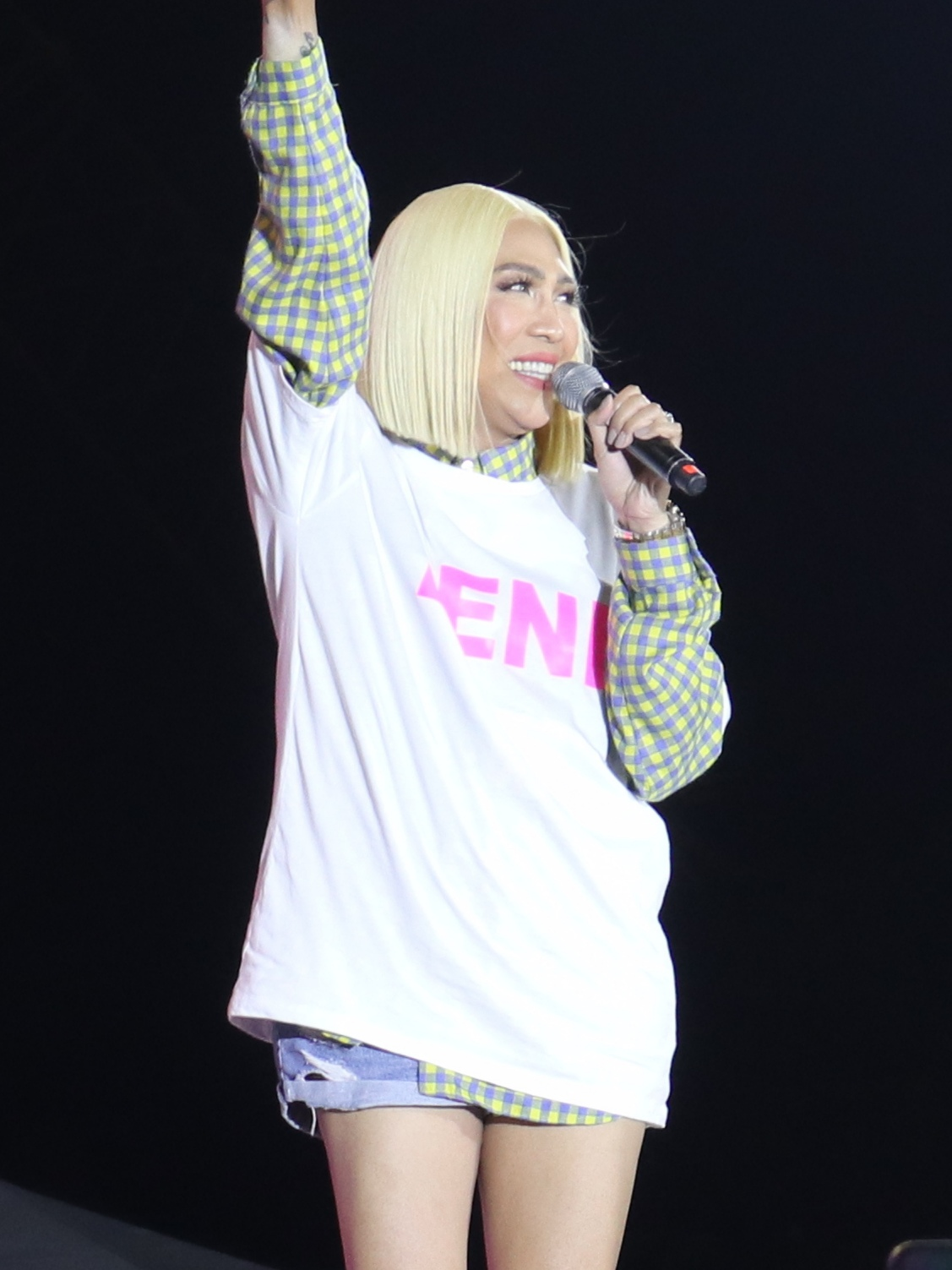
Vice Ganda, host of the variety show It's Showtime and the game show Everybody, Sing!.

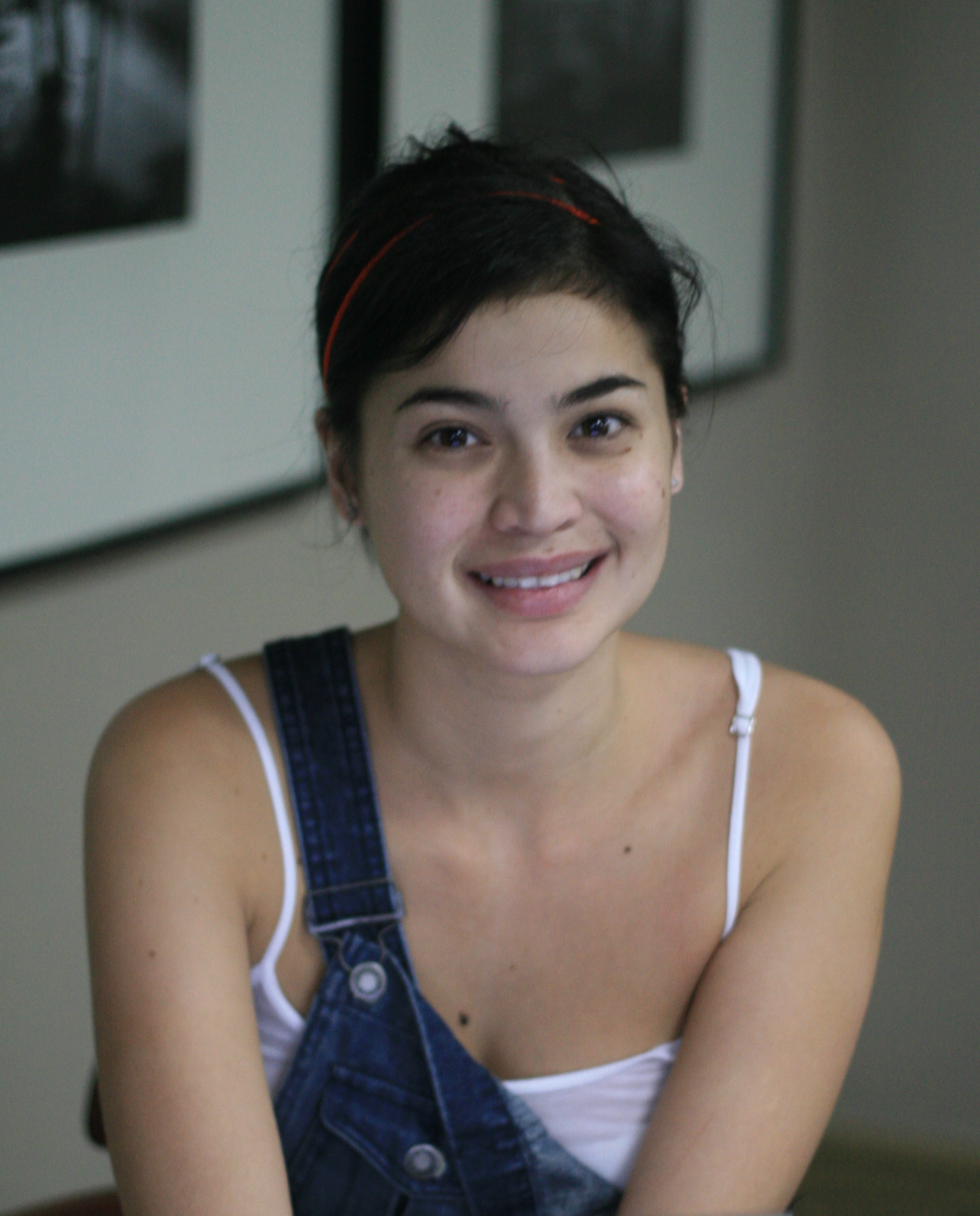
Anne Curtis, Host of the variety show It's Showtime

A2Z is currently broadcasting twenty-four original programs.

=== ABS-CBN-produced programs ===
Drama

Title	Premiere
Sigabo	June 22, 2026
Someone, Someday	July 27, 2026
The Loyalty Game: Level Up	October 5, 2026
Maalaala Mo Kaya	October 24, 2020
Miss Behave	September 5, 2026

Variety

Title	Premiere
It's Showtime	October 10, 2020
ASAP XP	October 11, 2020

Game

Title	Premiere
Kapamilya Deal or No Deal	April 25, 2026

Talk

Title	Premiere
Kuan on One	October 6, 2024
Oh My Gan!	June 29, 2026
Magandang Buhay	October 19, 2020
Matteo G. Primetime	October 10, 2026

News

Title	Premiere
TV Patrol	January 3, 2022
TV Patrol Express	July 1, 2024
TV Patrol Weekend	January 1, 2022

Magazine

Title	Premiere
Rated Korina	June 19, 2021
Tao Po!	June 18, 2023
Ibang Level 'To!	July 25, 2026

Infotainment

Title	Premiere
My Puhunan: Kaya Mo!	July 16, 2023

Documentary

Title	Premiere
Philippines' Most Shocking Stories	September 6, 2026
Philippines' Oddest Jobs	September 5, 2026
S.O.C.O.: Scene of the Crime Operatives	January 17, 2026

=== Light TV-produced programs ===
Title	Premiere
Diyos at Bayan	December 12, 2021

== Former original programming ==
=== Drama ===
- 2 Good 2 Be True (2022)
- A Family Affair (2022)
- Almost Paradise (2021)
- Ang sa Iyo ay Akin (2020–2021)
- Bagong Umaga (2020–2021)
- Bawal Lumabas: The Series (2021)
- Beach Bros (2023)
- Blood vs Duty (2026)
- Bola Bola (2022)
- Can't Buy Me Love (2023–2024)
- Click, Like, Share (2021–2022)
- Dirty Linen (2023)
- Flower of Evil (2022)
- FPJ's Ang Probinsyano (2020–2022)
- FPJ's Batang Quiapo (2023–2026)
- He's Into Her (2021–2022)
- High Street (2024)
- How to Spot a Red Flag (2025)
- Huwag Kang Mangamba (2021)
- Incognito (2025)
- Init sa Magdamag (2021)
- It's Okay to Not Be Okay (2025)
- La Vida Lena (2021–2022)
- Lavender Fields (2024–2025)
- Linlang: The Teleserye Version (2024)
- Love in 40 Days (2022)
- Lyric and Beat (2022)
- Marry Me, Marry You (2020–2022)
- Mars Ravelo's Darna (2022–2023)
- Nag-aapoy na Damdamin (2023–2024, co-production with TV5)
- Pamilya Sagrado (2024)
- Pira-Pirasong Paraiso (2023–2024, co-production with TV5)
- Roja (2025–2026)
- Run to Me (2022)
- Saving Grace: The Untold Story (2025)
- Senior High (2023–2024)
- Sins of the Father (2025)
- Tara, G! (2023)
- The Alibi: Ang Buong Katotohanan (2026)
- The Broken Marriage Vow (2022)
- The Iron Heart (2022–2023)
- Unloving U (2021)
- Viral Scandal (2021–2022)
- Walang Hanggang Paalam (2020–2021)
- What Lies Beneath (2025–2026)
- What's Wrong with Secretary Kim (2024)

=== Animated ===
- Hero City Kids Force (2022–2023)

=== Variety ===
- It's Your Lucky Day (temporary program, 2023)

=== Reality ===
- Idol Kids Philippines (2025)
- Idol Philippines (season 2) (2022)
- Pilipinas Got Talent (season 7) (2025)
- Pinoy Big Brother (2020–25)
  - Connect (2020–2021)
  - Kumunity Season 10 (2021–2022)
  - Gen 11 (2024)
  - Gen 11 Big 4 Ever (2024–2025)
- The Voice Kids (season 5) (2023)
- The Voice Teens (season 3) (2024)
- Time to Dance (2025)
- Your Face Sounds Familiar (2021; 2025–26)

=== Game ===
- I Can See Your Voice (2020–24)
- Rainbow Rumble (2024–26)

=== Comedy ===
- Goin' Bulilit (season 9) (2024, co-production with All TV)
- Hoy, Love You! (2021–2022)
- My Papa Pi (2022)

=== Current affairs ===
- Iba 'Yan! (2020–2021)
- KBYN: Kaagapay ng Bayan (2022–2023)
- Paano Kita Mapasasalamatan? (2020–2021)
- Tao Po! (2023–2026)

=== Informative ===
- Asenso Pinoy (2020–2023)
- Matanglawin (2020–2021)

=== News ===
- TV Patrol Regional (2025–2026)

== See also ==
- List of programs broadcast by ABS-CBN
- List of Kapamilya Channel original programming
- List of All TV original programming
- List of programs broadcast by Jeepney TV
- List of programs broadcast by Metro Channel
- List of ABS-CBN Studios original drama series
- List of programs broadcast by Light TV
- List of Philippine television shows
