= List of Kapamilya Channel original programming =

The following is a list of all original television programming by Kapamilya Channel since it began its television operations on June 13, 2020.

== Current original programming ==
Kapamilya Channel is currently broadcasting twenty-one original programs.

=== Drama ===
- Sigabo (Note: The show also aired on A2Z.) (Note: The show also aired on TV5.)(2026–present)
- Someone, Someday(2026–present)
- The Loyalty Game: Level Up(2026–present)
- Maalaala Mo Kaya (Note: The show also airs on TV5.)(1991–2022, 2025–present)
- Mommy Guard (Note: The show also airs on A2Z.)(2026–present)

=== Variety ===
- It's Showtime (Note: The show also aired on GMA Network.) (2009–present)
- ASAP XP (Note: The show also aired on Jeepney TV.) (1995–present)
- Vibe Plus Playback (Note: The show also airs on TV5.) (2026–present)

=== Game ===
- Kapamilya, Deal or No Deal (season 6) (2006–2016, 2026–present)

=== News ===
- TV Patrol (Note: The show also aired simulcast on A2Z, ANC, DZMM Radyo Patrol 630, DZMM TeleRadyo and PRTV Prime Media.) (1987–present)
- TV Patrol Weekend (Note: The show also aired simulcast on A2Z, ANC, DZMM Radyo Patrol 630, DZMM TeleRadyo and PRTV Prime Media.) (2004–present)
- News Patrol (Note: The show also aired on ANC.) (2005–present)
- The World Tonight (1966–1972, 1986–1999, 2020–present)
- TV Patrol Express (Note: The show also aired simulcast on A2Z.) (2024–present)

=== Documentary ===
- Philippines' Most Haunted (2026–present)
- Philippines' Oddest Jobs (2026–present)
- S.O.C.O.: Scene of the Crime Operatives (2005–2020; 2026–present)

=== Talk ===
- Gandang Mornings with Ate Koring (2026–present)
- Oh My Gan! (2026–present)
- Matteo G. Primetime (Note: The show also airs on TV5.) (2026–present)

=== Magazine ===
- Rated Korina(2004–2020, 2021–present)
- Ibang Level 'To! (2026–present)

=== Informative ===
- My Puhunan: Kaya Mo! (2013–2015, 2015–2020, 2023–present)

=== Religious ===
- The Healing Eucharist (2006–present)
- Kapamilya Daily Mass (2020–present)

== Former original programming ==
=== Drama ===
- 2 Good 2 Be True (2022)
- A Family Affair (2022)
- A Soldier's Heart (2020)
- Almost Paradise (2021)
- Ang sa Iyo ay Akin (2020–2021)
- Bagong Umaga (2020–2021)
- Bawal Lumabas: The Series (2021)
- Beach Bros (2023)
- Bola Bola (2022)
- Blood vs Duty (2026)
- Can't Buy Me Love (2023–2024)
- Click, Like, Share (2021–2022)
- Dirty Linen (2023)
- Drag You & Me (2023)
- Flower of Evil (2022)
- FPJ's Ang Probinsyano (2020–2022)
- FPJ's Batang Quiapo (2023–2026)
- He's Into Her (2021–2022)
- Hello, Heart (2023)
- High Street (2024)
- Hinahanap-Hanap Kita (2020)
- How to Spot a Red Flag (2025)
- Huwag Kang Mangamba (2021)
- Incognito (2025)
- Init sa Magdamag (2021)
- Ipaglaban Mo! (2020–2024)
- It's Okay to Not Be Okay (2025)
- La Vida Lena (2021–2022)
- Lavender Fields (2024–2025)
- Linlang: The Teleserye Version (2024)
- Love in 40 Days (2022)
- Love Thy Woman (2020)
- Lyric and Beat (2022)
- Marry Me, Marry You (2021–2022)
- Mars Ravelo's Darna (2022–2023)
- Misis Piggy (2023)
- My Sunset Girl (2023)
- Miss Behave (2026)
- Nag-aapoy na Damdamin (2023–2024)
- Pamilya Sagrado (2024)
- Pira-Pirasong Paraiso (2023–2024)
- Roja (2025–2026)
- Run to Me (2022)
- Saving Grace: The Untold Story (2025)
- Saying Goodbye (2023)
- Senior High (2023–2024)
- Sins of the Father (2025)
- Tara, G! (2023)
- Teen Clash (2023)
- The Alibi: Ang Buong Katotohanan (2026)
- The Broken Marriage Vow (2022)
- The Goodbye Girl (2023)
- The Iron Heart (2022–2023)
- Unloving U (2021)
- Viral Scandal (2021–2022)
- Walang Hanggang Paalam (2020–2021)
- What Lies Beneath (2025–2026)
- What's Wrong with Secretary Kim (2024)
- Zoomers (2024)

=== Variety ===
- It's Your Lucky Day (temporary program, 2023)

=== Reality ===
- Idol Kids Philippines (2025)
- Idol Philippines (season 2) (2022)
- Pilipinas Got Talent (season 7) (2025)
- Pinoy Big Brother: Connect (2020–2021)
- Pinoy Big Brother: Kumunity Season 10 (2021–2022)
- Pinoy Big Brother: Gen 11 (2024)
- Pinoy Big Brother: Gen 11 Big 4 Ever (2024–2025)
- Star Hunt: The Audition Show (2024)
- The Voice Kids (season 5) (2023)
- The Voice Teens (season 2) (2020)
- The Voice Teens (season 3) (2024)
- Time to Dance (2025)
- Your Face Sounds Familiar (season 3) (2021)
- Your Face Sounds Familiar (season 4) (2025–2026)

=== Game ===
- Everybody, Sing! (season 1) (2021)
- Everybody, Sing! (season 2) (2022–2023)
- Everybody, Sing! (season 3) (2023–2024)
- Everybody, Sing! (season 4) (2026)
- I Can See Your Voice (season 3) (2020–2021)
- I Can See Your Voice (season 4) (2022)
- I Can See Your Voice (season 5) (2023–2024)
- Rainbow Rumble (season 1) (2024–2025)
- Rainbow Rumble (season 2) (2025–2026)
- Tubig to Handle: What the Fun! (2026)

=== Comedy ===
- Goin' Bulilit (season 9) (2024)
- Hoy, Love You! (2021–2022)
- My Papa Pi (2022)

=== Talk ===
- Kuan on One (2024–2026)
- Lucky Tulong (2020–2021)
- Magandang Buhay (2020–2026)
- Real Talk: The Heart of the Matter (2021)
- Sakto (2020–2023)
- We Rise Together (2021–2022)
- Y Speak 2.0 (2026)

=== News ===
- Gising Pilipinas! (2020)
- Radyo Patrol Balita Alas-Siyete (2020)
- TV Patrol Regional (2025–2026)
- TeleBalita (2020)
- TeleRadyo Balita (2020–2023)

=== Current affairs ===
- Iba 'Yan! (2020–2021)
- KBYN: Kaagapay ng Bayan (2022–2023)
- Kabayan (2020–2023)
- Paano Kita Mapasasalamatan? (2020–2021)
- Philippines' Most Shocking Stories (2026)
- Tao Po! (2023–2026)

=== Informative ===
- G Diaries (2020–2024)
- Swak na Swak (2020–2021)
- Team FitFil (2020–2024)

=== Kid-oriented ===
- Team Yey! (season 5) (2020)
- Team Yey! Explains (2023–24)
- Pop Babies (2020)

== See also ==
- List of programs broadcast by ABS-CBN
- List of A2Z original programming
- List of All TV original programming
- List of programs broadcast by Jeepney TV
- List of programs broadcast by Metro Channel
- List of ABS-CBN Studios original drama series
- List of Philippine television shows
