= Anji Salvacion =

Filipina-Ukrainian singer and actress

- Born: Angie Kristine Allen Salvacion Gorbulev; September 24, 2002 (age 24); Siargao, Surigao del Norte, Philippines
- Occupations: Singer, actress
- Years active: 2018–present
- Agent: Star Magic (2018–present)
- Title: PBB Kumunity Season 10; Big Winner
- Predecessor: (Connect) Liofer Pinatacan
- Successor: (Gen 11) Fyang Smith

Angie Kristine Allen Salvacion Gorbulev (born September 24, 2002) better known as Anji Salvacion (Tagalog: [ˈandʒi sɐlbɐˈʃon]), is a Filipino singer, actress and television personality best known for winning the tenth season of Pinoy Big Brother.

Anji Salvacion competed on Idol Philippines in 2019, progressing through the Theatre Rounds. She starred in Unloving U (2021) and Linlang (2023), and sang songs for the soundtracks of Unloving U, Marry Me, Marry You (2021) and My Sunset Girl (2021). Her first extended play (EP) entitled Kasingkasing Dalampasigan was released on April 29, 2022, reaching number 1 on iTunes PH hours after its release.

== Early life ==
Angie Kristine Allen Salvacion Gorbulev was born on September 24, 2002, in Siargao, Surigao del Norte to a Filipino mother and a Jamaican -Russian father. In her teenage years, Anji competed in singing contests and beauty pageants as her mother, Melisa's way of improving her daughter's confidence.

== Career ==
=== 2019–2021: ASAP and Idol Philippines ===
Idol Philippines season 1 performances and results
Episode	Theme	Song	Original artist	Order	Result
Auditions	Contestant's choice	"Jar of Hearts"	Christina Perri	N/A	Advanced
Episode 15	Group's choice	"Best Part" (as part of The Current)	Daniel Caesar ft. H.E.R.	6	Advanced
Episode 17	Do or Die	"Ang Huling El Bimbo" (with Denize Castillo, Zephanie Dimaranan, Diane Vergoza, Elle Ocampo, Jeremaiah Toranyo and Jehramae Trangia)	Eraserheads	6	Eliminated

In 2019, Salvacion auditioned for Idol Philippines as Angie Kristine, performing Christina Perri's "Jar of Hearts". She would then progress through the Theatre Rounds until her elimination in the Do or Die Round. Following her run in the show, Anji took on minor, non-credited background roles on soap operas, as well as serving as a stand-in for actors in commercials.

In 2021, Salvacion landed a starring role in Unloving U in which she played the character named Waltz, a miniseries which aired in February that year. She also recorded songs for the soundtrack for the series, and for the soundtracks of Marry Me, Marry You and My Sunset Girl. In April 2021, she became a mainstay performer on ASAP Natin 'To, along with being a part of the influencer group, The Squad Plus.

=== 2021–present: Pinoy Big Brother and Dalampasigan ===
Later that year, Salvacion competed as a celebrity housemate in Pinoy Big Brother: Kumunity Season 10. After surviving five eviction votes and becoming a Head of Household once, Salvacion would advance to the final phase of the competition after being voted to be part of the Celebrity Top 2, temporarily exiting the competition as other groups of housemates entered to compete in the house.

During her temporary leave from the show, she released her debut single Dalampasigan, a self-penned composition about her love for her dad and also dedicates the song to devastated island in fundraising concert. Salvacion also released her first extended play (EP) entitled Kasingkasing Dalampasigan on April 29, 2022, which peaked number 1 on iTunes Philippines. A day after the release of her EP, she performed in her first digital concert entitled Anji Salvacion: The Feels Concert, which aired on KTX.

Salvacion's stint on the reality show would be resumed on May 15, 2022, wherein she returned to compete against her fellow Biga-10 housemates as part of the Celebrity Top 2. Following her batch's win in the Kumuni-Test competitions, she advanced to the finale along with her fellow celebrity housemates Samantha Bernardo and Brenda Mage. In the season finale which aired on May 29, 2022, she won the season with a landslide victory against adult housemate and then runner-up Isabel Laohoo, among four other finalists, including Bernardo, Blackburn and Mage.

== Personal life ==
During her stint in Pinoy Big Brother: Kumunity Season 10, Salvacion revealed her longing for long-lost father and the questions she has been wanting to ask her mother. Production would later step in and have Melisa, Salvacion's mother, personally address her questions.

== Discography ==
=== Extended plays ===
List of extended plays with details
Title	Album Details	Ref.
Kasingkasing Dalampasigan	Released: April 29, 2022; Label: StarPop; Format: Digital download, Streaming; Track listing: 1. Love You Like Crazy; 2. Happier Without Me; 3. Best Mistake; 4. Hindi Madali; 5. Kung Sabagay; 6. Dalampasigan	

=== Singles ===
List of singles showing year released and album name
Title	Year	Album
"Dalampasigan"	2022	Kasingkasing Dalampasigan

=== Soundtracks ===
Title	Year	Film/TV Show
"Keeps on Coming Back"	2021	Unloving U
"Kaya Pala" (with Loisa Andalio, KD Estrada, Sam Cruz)	2021	Unloving U
"Buo"	2021	Marry Me, Marry You
"Don't Be Afraid" (with KD Estrada)	2021	My Sunset Girl
"Don't Be Afraid" (solo version)	2021	My Sunset Girl

== Filmography ==
=== Television series ===
Year	Title	Role	Network	Ref.
2021	Unloving U	Waltz	iWantTFC	
2023	Linlang	Kate Alcantara	Amazon Prime Video	

=== Web film ===
Year	Title	Role	Ref.
2025	The Four Bad Boys and Me	Candice Gonzales	

== Music video appearances ==
Year	Title	Performed by	Music Video Performers	Produced By	Executive Producer
2021	"Hanggang Dito Lang Tayo"	Six Part Invention	Anji Salvacion and KD Estrada	Rey Cantong	Mother Of Inventions Studio by Rey Cantong
2022	"Dalampasigan"	Anji Salvacion	Anji Salvacion and Jhamvil Villanueva (Guest Artist)	Roxy Liquigan	ABS-CBN Star Music
2022	"Umiibig Parin"	Sam Cruz	Jameson Blake, Anji Salvacion, Noella Martinez and Timothy Recla	Universal Records Philippines	Universal Records (Philippines)
2022	"It's Okay Not to be Okay"	Angela Ken	Anji Salvacion and Eian Rances	Roxy Liquigan	ABS-CBN Star Music
2022	"Sino Na Tayo"	Diego Gutierrez	Anji Salvacion and Diego Gutierrez	Mark J. Feist	Mark Finn, Mark J. Feist, Big Billy Clark for Hitmakers Entertainment, LLC
2022	"Coz of You"	Kyla, Brian McKnight Jr.	Anji Salvacion and Brent Manalo	Brian McKnight Jr., Jonathan Manalo	Tarsier Records

=== Television/digital ===
Year	Title	Role	Note	Ref.
2019	Idol Philippines (season 1)	Contestant	Eliminated in Theater Rounds; Credited as Angie Kristine	
2020–present	ASAP	Herself/Performer	Dance Sirens (2024–present)	
2021	Unloving U	Waltz		
2021–2022	Pinoy Big Brother: Kumunity Season 10	Herself/Contestant	Big Winner	
2022	Magandang Buhay	Herself, Guest		
2022	It's Showtime	Herself, Guest Judge		
2022	Idol Philippines (season 2)	Herself, Guest Performer / Online Main host	Broadcast: 1 episode Online: 3 episodes	
2022–2023	PIE Galingan	Herself, Channel Jock		
2023	Pak na Pak! Palong Follow	Herself, Guest		
2023	Papa ng Masa	Herself, Host		
2023	Linlang	Kate Alcantara		

== See also ==
- List of Pinoy Big Brother Housemates

Preceded by Liofer Pinatacan	Pinoy Big Brother; Big Winner; 2021	Succeeded by Fyang Smith
Preceded by (Brazil) Daniel Matsunaga	Pinoy Big Brother; Celebrity Big Winner; 2021	Succeeded by Incumbent
