= Run to Me (miniseries) =

Philippine streaming television miniseries

- Official release poster
- Genre: Romantic comedy Drama
- Written by: Jeko Aguado; Mark Raywin Tome
- Directed by: Dwein Ruedas Baltazar
- Starring: KD Estrada; Alexa Ilacad
- Music by: Emerzon Texon
- Opening theme: "Misteryo" by Alexa Ilacad and KD Estrada
- Composers: Alexa Ilacad, Eunice Jorge
- Country of origin: Philippines
- Original language: Filipino
- No. of episodes: 6

Production
- Executive producers: Roland Ros; Rexy Dorado; Angelo Mendez; Carlo L. Katigbak; Cory V. Vidanes; Roldeo T. Endrinal; Jamie C. Lopez; Ginny Monteagudo-Ocampo
- Producer: Ronald Dantes Atianzar
- Editor: Marcel Pinol Jr.
- Running time: 30 - 40 minutes
- Production companies: Dreamscape Entertainment; Kumu

Original release
- Network: iWantTFC
- Release: May 21 – June 25, 2022

Run to Me is a Philippine romantic comedy drama streaming television miniseries produced under the collaboration between Dreamscape Entertainment, iWantTFC, and social networking service Kumu, starring KD Estrada and Alexa Ilacad in their first main role as a loveteam. It was directed by Dwein Ruedas Baltazar.

The series premiered from May 20 to June 24, 2022 on Kumu and May 21 to June 25, 2022 on iWantTFC.

== Premise ==
Jewel is introduced as "Ms. Perfect" and Wilson as "Mr. Perfect Son." Jewel is enjoying a successful career online, but craves for the love and affection from her mother; Wilson is struggling to make it in the digital scene for his ailing mother, yet receives all the love from her. The two cross paths in a "not-so-perfect situation" after he tries to rescue her from kidnappers. However, what he doesn't know is that it was a staged kidnap, which she planned herself. As two hearts run into each other, will they be able to find the love that they're longing for?

== Cast and characters ==
=== Main cast ===
- KD Estrada as Wilson
- Alexa Ilacad as Jewel

=== Supporting cast ===
- Nikki Valdez as Mami Bebot†
- Mickey Ferriols as Emerald
- CJ Navato as Dranreb
- Malou Crisologo as Manang Bertha
- Peewee O'Hara as Lola Carol
- Karl Gabriel as Aion
- Ivan Carapiet as Guillermo
- Margaux Montaña as Vanessa
- Henz Villaraiz as Pogi
- Matty Juniosa as Kimba
- Sean Tristan as Diamond
- Haira Palaguitto as Lyn
- Alexa Macanan as Claudine
- Ross Pesigan as Boy Batak
- Jess Mendoza as Kuya Barry
- Madam Inutz as Nanet

== Episodes ==
Kumu shows one episode first in advance before its streaming availability on iWantTFC.

No.	Title	Original release date
1	"Run to Me"	May 21, 2022
The completely opposite lives of Wilson, a cash-strapped musician, and Jewel, a famous online personality, intertwine when a fake kidnapping goes wrong.
2	"On the Run"	May 28, 2022
After successfully foiling her kidnapping activity, Wilson must decide to help Jewel with her fake kidnapping scheme.
3	"Reset"	June 4, 2022
The search for Jewel continues, while she and Wilson arrived at Sitio Singko Star with fanfare from the neighbors and adjusts to rural life in hiding. After overhearing their argument, Jewel has thought of helping Wilson with earning money for Mami Bebot's medical needs.
4	"Finish Lines"	June 11, 2022
After witnessing Jewel with Wilson, Aion unexpectedly reunites with her and stays at Mami Bebot's place overnight. After seeing him being upset at daytime, Mami Bebot chats with Wilson, and Wilson had come to grips with the fact that Mami Bebot would face death rather than continue living. Diamond and Manang Bertha in Emerald's household have learnt of Jewel's location via Aion, and word of her alleged kidnapping has reached the inhabitants of Sitio Singko Star. With this, Wilson must explain the phony kidnapping scheme to Mami Bebot, and Jewel must leave Wilson and Sitio Singko Star and return to Manila.
5	"Running in Circles"	June 18, 2022
Wilson begins life without Mami Bebot; and Jewel, while in Mami Bebot's wake, is forced to leave Sitio Singko Star after being spotted by Emerald. Jewel had an argument with Emerald back home, explaining how she neglected Jewel of her love after her father's passing. Jewel and Wilson reconnected and agreed to meet up again, only for him with Dranreb to arrive at Jewel's house without her, and Jewel to be kidnapped in real life after leaving the house in secret once more.
6	"Run Back to You"	June 25, 2022
Emerald rescues Jewel with the aid of Wilson, Dranreb, Kuya Barry, and Manang Bertha, who phoned the police, after pursuing the same kidnapper who took her. Following the incident, Jewel went live on Kumu to express regret to her audience, thanked everyone she had met, and made up with Emerald. Since then, however, Jewel and Wilson have not spoken to one another. That is, until Jewel herself returns to Sitio Singko Star to surprise and reunite with Wilson with a duet, at which point both of them formally declared their emotions for one another and became a pair.

=== Special ===
No.	Title	Original release date
7	"Run to Me Finale Concert"	June 25, 2022
The breakthrough love team of KD Estrada and Alexa Ilacad captivate hearts with the finale concert of their first-ever web series. With the finalists of Kumu Sing in a Serye, KDLex performs renditions and originals from the series' soundtrack.

== Official soundtrack ==
Run to Me (Original Soundtrack)

Soundtrack album by Alexa Ilacad & KD Estrada
- Released: May 27, 2022
- Recorded: 2022
- Genre: OPM, Indie pop, Soundtrack
- Length: 20:24
- Language: Filipino, English
- Label: Star Music
- Producer: Jonathan Manalo; Eunice Jorge

The official soundtrack for the series was released on May 27, 2022, and consists of tracks mostly composed by Ilacad with contributions from Estrada and Gracenote lead vocalist Eunice Jorge including two earlier released singles "Misteryo" and "When I See You Again". All tracks except for one were composed during the pair's time in Pinoy Big Brother: Kumunity Season 10.

Just after its release, the official soundtrack ranked Number 1 in the iTunes Philippines chart, with all of its tracks placed in the Top 10 songs chart at one point.

Run to Me (Original Soundtrack)
No.	Title	Writer(s)	Artist	Length
1.	"Misteryo"	Alexa Ilacad, Eunice Jorge	Alexa Ilacad, KD Estrada	4:14
2.	"When I See You Again"	Alexa Ilacad, KD Estrada	KD Estrada, Alexa Ilacad	3:55
3.	"Kasi, Kung, Kahit"	Alexa Ilacad	Alexa Ilacad	3:46
4.	"Hiwaga"	Alexa Ilacad	Alexa Ilacad, KD Estrada	4:31
5.	"Palagi"	Alexa Ilacad	Alexa Ilacad, KD Estrada	3:56
Total length:				20:24

== Production ==
=== Background ===
Along with the announcement of Closer: the KDLex Fan Con, a new series was being teased by Dreamscape Entertainment first known as More Than Words in January 2022.

=== Casting ===
This is the first series for Ilacad and Estrada as lead actors and as a loveteam dubbed as "KDLex", where the two were part of the Celebrity Edition of Pinoy Big Brother: Kumunity Season 10 in 2021.

=== Marketing ===
A teaser was released on April 29, 2022 in the official iWantTFC YouTube channel. Its release date have to be announced. While, the full trailer was released on May 6, 2022 in the official iWantTFC YouTube channel. On May 13, 2022 a second trailer was released.

== Release ==
=== Broadcast ===
Episodes are released for viewing through a watch party every Friday at 8:00 PM, with replays every Saturday at 10:00 AM, 1:00 PM, and 4:00 PM on the Dreamscape Entertainment account on Kumu, and be made available for streaming on iWantTFC every Saturday at 8:00 PM.

The series had its Philippine TV Premiere from September 11 to October 2, 2022 on Yes Weekend Sunday primetime on Kapamilya Channel, Kapamilya Online Live and A2Z replacing Bola Bola and was replaced by Lyric and Beat. It also aired international via TFC (The Filipino Channel).

== See also ==
- List of programs broadcast by ABS-CBN
- List of programs distributed by ABS-CBN Entertainment
- List of Kapamilya Channel original programming
- List of A2Z (TV channel) original programming
- List of iWantTFC original programming
- List of ABS-CBN original drama series
