= KD Estrada =

Filipino actor and musician

- Born: Kyle Daiñel Magno Estrada; May 3, 2002 (age 24); Parañaque, Metro Manila, Philippines
- Citizenship: Filipino
- Occupations: Singer; Songwriter; Actor
- Years active: 2019–present
- Agent: Star Magic (2019–present)
- Height: 5 ft 10 in (178 cm)
- Musical career
- Genres: OPM
- Years active: 2019–present
- Label: Star Music (2019–present)
- Website: https://kdestrada.carrd.co

Kyle Daiñel Magno Estrada (born May 3, 2002), better known as KD Estrada is a Filipino actor, singer, songwriter, and composer. He is mostly known for his stint as a celebrity housemate of Pinoy Big Brother: Kumunity Season 10.

== Personal life ==
Estrada was born on May 3, 2002, in Parañaque. Contrary to the belief of some people, he is not related to any of the Estradas in the Philippine entertainment and political scene. (Note: This includes the Ejercito-Estrada family of San Juan (most especially patriarch Joseph and sons Jinggoy, JV and Jake, and their other relatives, including ER); the Leyte-born actress and singer Karla Estrada (whose real name is Carla Ford); and the father-daughter tandem of John and Kaila Estrada, who are also actors under the same management as KD.) He's not dating Alexa Ilacad, singer and actress from ABS-CBN.

== Career ==
=== 2019–2020: Career beginnings ===
In 2019, he started being a Star Magic trainee and eventually released self-written single One of Many under StarPop, a subsidiary of music label Star Music.

In 2020, He appeared as a performer in the Brightlight Productions' show Sunday Noontime Live! which aired in TV5. However, after just three months on air, the show released their final episode due to low ratings and high production costs. Its timeslot was later filled by a simulcast of ASAP.

=== 2021–present: New Projects, New Music, PBB and KDLex ===
In 2021, Estrada along with other new artists were added as the new members of The Squad Plus (now The Squad 2022, formerly known as The Gold Squad, popularized from the hit TV series Kadenang Ginto), joining its original members Andrea Brillantes, Kyle Echarri, Francine Diaz, and Seth Fedelin. The Squad 2022 runs a YouTube channel with over 3.27M subscribers (as of May 2022), where they regularly post challenges, games, and song covers.

Aside from The Squad 2022, Estrada was also a part of ASAP Natin 'To's New Breed of Singers alongside fellow Squadmates Angela Ken, Sam Cruz, Anji Salvacion, and Diego Guttierez.

As a budding actor, Estrada appeared in Loisa Andalio and Ronnie Alonte's original iWantTFC series Unloving U. He also participated in the series' soundtrack. The series' soundtrack features his original composition Saves It which was a duet with the lead actress Loisa Andalio, as well as Kaya Pala which he performed alongside Loisa Andalio, Sam Cruz, and Anji Salvacion.

Estrada also recorded a Chinese version of Mabagal (originally by Moira Dela Torre and Daniel Padilla) with Singaporean artist Haven.

In the same year, Estrada joined Pinoy Big Brother: Kumunity Season 10, the tenth overall season of Pinoy Big Brother as part of the first batch of housemates in the Celebrity Edition, having been evicted on Day 71 alongside fellow housemate and future on-screen partner Alexa Ilacad. His entry inside the PBB House was notable for his musical contributions throughout the season, opening the discussion on mental health inside the house having experienced anxiety and depression; and the eventual closeness between him and Ilacad that grew as they consoled each other from their individual episodes inside the house—even calling the latter as his greatest takeaway from the show.

During his stay inside the house, it was revealed through iWantTFC's blue carpet event Unwrapped that he will be one of Francine Diaz' three leading men for upcoming Web series Bola Bola.

In 2022, After being evicted, he and Ilacad began to appear on a number of shows and interviews together such as IWant ASAP, Kumunity: G sa Gabi with Robi Domingo, KAPAMILYA Journeys of Hope with Father Tito Caluag, and PBB Kumu Big Arrival, where they performed with musical icon Rico Blanco. He also went back to performing in ASAP Natin 'To.

ABS-CBN launched a project for the victims of typhoon Odette—100 days of various fundraising activities starting from the 10-day By Request benefit concert. KDLex—Estrada and Ilacad's love team partnership were part of the first lineup of artists to perform. During their session, they have reached over 100,000 live viewers just from the KUMU stream alone.

Due to rising popularity, in one of the pair's ASAP Natin 'To stints, it was announced that they will headline a FanCon and the upcoming Dreamscape and iWantTFC series Run To Me(originally announced as More Than Words) which will premiere this summer.

Ahead of the KDLex concert, the pair delivered their first single Misteryo under Star Music, as well as the Pinoy Big Brother: Kumunity Season 10 - Adult Edition eviction song, When I See you Again which the pair wrote and composed together during their time in the Big Brother House. In less than 12 hours, the two singles placed at #1 and #2 respectively on the iTunes Philippines Top 100.

Shortly after the announcement, Estrada and Ilacad held the online fan concert event through KTX.ph entitled Closer: The KDLex Fan Con on February 26, in time with the actress' 22nd birthday. First selling of the SVIP and VIP tickets for their concert reportedly became sold-out in just an hour. Due to high demand from fans, KTX.ph added additional tickets for the show. Shortly after, it got sold out again and several times more.

As his first acting project of the year, Estrada, alongside Francine Diaz, BGYO member Akira Morishita, and Ashton Salvador starred in iWantTFC's Web series Bola Bola. This marked the actor's first ever lead role in his career. As part of the series' soundtrack, he released another self-composed song under StarPop, Mahal Ba Kita?

Ahead of the 2022 Presidential Elections in the Philippines, Estrada along with Alexa Ilacad, Angela Ken, Antenorcruz, FANA, iDolls, Janine Berdin, JM Yosures, JMKO, Jona, Anji Salvacion, Lara Maigue, Reiven Umali, and the TNT Boys took part in the release of the reimagined version of Pag-Isipan Mo Ang Boto Mo which was originally composed and recorded by Jamie Rivera.

In celebration of Star Magic's 30th anniversary and after launching SLAY, the agency is set to launch FLEX—its second digital video magazine. It aims to end toxic masculinity by promoting a new idea called modern masculinity. On May 3, in time with the actor's 20th birthday, Estrada announced over Star Magic's Instagram account that he will be the magazine's first ever cover boy.

Prior to their series, Estrada and Ilacad starred as Jamir Xyrus and Janna Gives in Don't Cry Janna, a 4-episode KUMUserye directed by Cathy Garcia-Molina.

In May the same year, KDLex's most-awaited digital series, Run To Me directed by Dwein Baltazar premiered in iWantTFC and KUMU (later in Kapamilya Channel, Kapamilya Online Live, and A2Z). Produced by ABS-CBN Entertainment, Dreamscape Entertainment, iWantTFC, and KUMU, the series also stars Malou Crisologo, CJ Navato, Karl Gabriel, Ivan Carapiet, Margaux Montana, Henz Villariz, Matty Juniosa, and Haira Palaguitto. Together with the series, the pair also dropped their soundtrack album which dominated the local iTunes chart jumping to the #1 spot upon its midnight release. Their official soundtrack album ranked atop the local album list, while five of its tracks placed in the top 10 songs chart, Hiwaga at 1st spot, followed by Palagi at 2nd, Kasi, Kung, Kahit at 3rd, Misteryo at 4th, and When I See You Again at 5th. The single versions of When I See You Again, and Misteryo also placed 6th and 8th respectively. In summation, seven out of the top 10 songs on iTunes Philippines were from the pair.

In August, Star Magic toured in the United States as part of their 30th anniversary celebration. Estrada were among the stars who staged the shows. The artists first performed in the Newport Performing Arts Theater, Resorts World Manila, followed by the US shows in Kings Theater, Brooklyn, The Warfield, San Francisco, and in the Saban Theatre, Beverly Hills.

Through their fan's support, Estrada and Ilacad landed a billboard in South Korea as the pair won the Best International Artist at IdolPick's 82nd Electronic Signboard Event, and again on the next month at its 83rd Electronic Signboard Event. IdolPick is a web service provided by Dong-A Ilbo where you can pick and vote for your favorite idol.

In November, the Philippine Educational Theater Association (PETA) officially welcomed Estrada and Ilacad to its family. They are selected as lead actors in PETA's return to producing original Filipino musicals through musical play Walang Aray, a take on Severino Reyes' 1898 classic zarzuela Walang Sugat. The play opened to the public February 17 and ran until May 14, 2023.

== Filmography ==
=== Film ===
Year	Title	Role	Ref.
2024	Fruitcake	Jolo	
2025	Co-Love	Jarred	
2025	Meet, Greet & Bye	Young Tupe	

=== Television ===
Year	Title	Role	Ref.
2020	Sunday Noontime Live!	Himself / Performer	
2021–present	ASAP Natin 'To	Himself / Performer	
2021	Unloving U	Jam	
2021	Pinoy Big Brother: Kumunity Season 10	Himself / Celebrity Housemate	
2022	Magandang Buhay	Himself / Guest	
2022	I Can See Your Voice	Himself / Guest	
2022	Bola Bola	Julian	
2022	Don't Cry Janna	Jamir Xyrus	
2022	Run to Me	Wilson "Mr. Slapsoil"	
2022	It's Showtime	Himself / Performer	
2022	Pinoy Big Brother: Kumunity Season 10	Himself / Performer	
2023–2024	Pira-Pirasong Paraiso	Elon Sebastian-Lamadrid	
2023–present	Eat Bulaga!	Himself / Performer	
2023–present	It's Showtime	Himself / Performer	
2024	TV Patrol	Himself / Guest Star Patroller	
2026	The Loyalty Game	Harry Valdez	
2026	Sun Chaser	La Bamba (voice)	

=== Concerts ===
==== Offline ====
Year	Title	Tour	Venue	Notes	Ref.
2022	Star Magic 30: Beyond The Stars (Manila Show)	Star Magic 30th Anniversary Tour	Newport Performing Arts Theater, Resorts World Manila	In celebration of Star Magic's 30th anniversary	
2022	Star Magic 30: Beyond The Stars (New York Show)	Star Magic 30th Anniversary Tour	Kings Theater, Brooklyn	In celebration of Star Magic's 30th anniversary	
2022	Star Magic 30: Beyond The Stars (San Francisco Show)	Star Magic 30th Anniversary Tour	The Warfield, San Francisco	In celebration of Star Magic's 30th anniversary	
2022	Star Magic 30: Beyond The Stars (Los Angeles Show)	Star Magic 30th Anniversary Tour	Saban Theatre, Beverly Hills	In celebration of Star Magic's 30th anniversary	

==== Online ====
Year	Title	Notes
2022	By Request: A Benefit Concert	for the victims of typhoon Odette.
2022	Kilig Match with KDLex	for the victims of typhoon Odette.
2022	Closer: The KDLex Fan Con	—N/a
2022	Run To Me Finale Concert	the special last episode of Run To Me series.

=== Musical Plays ===
Year	Title	Role (Performance)	Role (Production)
2021	Takot Ang Pinoy	Guitarist	Assistant Director, musical director, Lyricist, Composer
2023	Walang Aray	Tenyong	—N/a

=== Music Video Appearances ===
Year	Title	Performer(s)	Note/s
2020	Saves It	KD Estrada	—N/a
2021	Sa Puso Mo (Visualizer)	KD Estrada	—N/a
2022	Pag-Isipan Mo Ang Boto Mo	ABS-CBN Music All Stars	2022 Presidential Elections Anthem
2022	Misteryo	KD Estrada, Alexa Ilacad	—N/a
2022	Pabalik Sa'yo	Darren Espanto	—N/a
2022	Tayo Ang Ligaya ng Isa’t Isa	Various	ABS-CBN Christmas Station ID 2022
2023	Days	KD Estrada	—N/a
2023	Pangako Yan	KD Estrada, Alexa Ilacad, with the PETA ensemble (Yeyin dela Cruz, Ayla Garcia, Ada Tayao, Tom Bienvenida, Donn Boco, Csai Habla)	Walang Aray Cast Recording

== Discography ==
=== Singles ===
Year	Title	Label	Ref.
2019	One of Many	StarPop	
2020	Saves It	StarPop	
2021	Sa Puso Mo	StarPop	
2021	幸福该有的美	AOR Global	
2021	Mabagal (Chinese & Acoustic Version)	StarPop	
2021	Holiday Love	StarPop	
2022	Misteryo	StarPop	
2022	When I See You Again	StarPop	
2022	Misteryo (Dancehall Remix)	StarPop	
2022	Days	StarPop	

=== Albums ===
==== Soundtrack/Compilation Albums ====
Year	Album	Song title	Label
2021	Unloving U (Original Soundtrack)	Saves It	Star Music
2021	Unloving U (Original Soundtrack)	Kaya Pala	Star Music
2021	Unloving U (Original Soundtrack)	Keeps on Coming Back	Star Music
2021	Unloving U (Original Soundtrack)	Kaya Pala	Star Music
2021	Marry Me, Marry You (Original Soundtrack)	Marry Me, Marry You	Star Music
2021	Marry Me, Marry You (Original Soundtrack)	Dreams Don't Wait	Star Music
2021	Marry Me, Marry You (Original Soundtrack)	One Day	Star Music
2021	Marry Me, Marry You (Original Soundtrack)	Buo	Star Music
2021	Marry Me, Marry You (Original Soundtrack)	Sila Parin	Star Music
2021	Marry Me, Marry You (Original Soundtrack)	When It's All Over	Star Music
2021	My Sunset Girl (Original Soundtrack)	Don't Be Afraid	Star Music
2021	My Sunset Girl (Original Soundtrack)	Don't Be Afraid	Star Music
2022	Bola Bola (Original Soundtrack)	Mahal Ba Kita?	Star Music
2022	Bola Bola (Original Soundtrack)	Mahal Na Kita	Star Music
2022	Bola Bola (Original Soundtrack)	Mahal Na Kita	Star Music
2022	Run To Me (Original Soundtrack)	Misteryo	StarPop
2022	Run To Me (Original Soundtrack)	When I See You Again	StarPop
2022	Run To Me (Original Soundtrack)	Kasi, Kung, Kahit	StarPop
2022	Run To Me (Original Soundtrack)	Hiwaga	StarPop
2022	Run To Me (Original Soundtrack)	Palagi	StarPop
2022	StarPop - The Remixes	Misteryo - Dancehall Remix	StarPop

=== Appears On ===
==== As a Featured Artist ====
Year	Title	Label	Note
2022	Pag-Isipan Mo Ang Boto Mo	ABS-CBN, Star Music	2022 Presidential Elections Anthem

==== OST ====
Year	Title	Show	Label	Ref.
2021	Saves It	Unloving U	Star Music	
2021	Kaya Pala	Unloving U	Star Music	
2021	Don't Be Afraid	My Sunset Girl	Star Music	
2021	Dreams Don't Wait	Marry Me, Marry You	Star Music	
2022	When I See You Again	Pinoy Big Brother: Kumunity Season 10 - Adult Edition	Star Music	
2022	Mahal Ba Kita?	Bola Bola	Star Music	
2022	Misteryo	Run To Me	StarPop	
2022	When I See You Again	Run To Me	StarPop	
2022	Hiwaga	Run To Me	StarPop	
2022	Palagi	Run To Me	StarPop	

==== Station ID ====
Year	Title	Label
2022	TagumPIE	PIE
2022	Tayo Ang Ligaya ng Isa’t Isa	ABS-CBN, Star Music

=== Composition Credits ===
Year	Title	Performed by	Written and Composed by	Produced by	Credited (on Spotify)	Credited (on YouTube)	Label	Ref.
2019	One of Many	KD Estrada	credited as Kyle Daniel Estrada	Roque "Rox" Santos	Yes	Yes	StarPop	
2020	Saves It	KD Estrada	credited as Kyle Daniel Estrada	Roque "Rox" Santos	Yes	Yes	StarPop	
2021	Sa Puso Mo	KD Estrada	credited as Kyle Daniel Estrada	Roque "Rox" Santos	Yes	Yes	StarPop	
2021	Holiday Love	KD Estrada	KD Estrada	Roque "Rox" Santos	Yes	Yes	StarPop	
2022	When I See You Again	KD Estrada, Alexa Ilacad	KD Estrada, Alexa Ilacad	Jonathan Manalo	Yes	Yes	StarPop	
2022	Mahal Ba Kita?	KD Estrada	KD Estrada	Jonathan Manalo	Yes	Yes	StarPop	
2022	Kasi, Kung, Kahit	Alexa Ilacad	KD Estrada, Alexa Ilacad	Jonathan Manalo	No	Yes	StarPop	
2022	Hiwaga	KD Estrada, Alexa Ilacad	KD Estrada, Alexa Ilacad	Jonathan Manalo	No	Yes	StarPop	
2022	Palagi	KD Estrada, Alexa Ilacad	KD Estrada, Alexa Ilacad	Jonathan Manalo	No	Yes	StarPop	
2022	Days	KD Estrada	KD Estrada	Roque "Rox" Santos	Yes	Yes	StarPop	

== Awards and nominations ==
=== Movies and Television Awards ===
Year	Award Ceremony	Category	Nominated work	Result	Ref.
2022	VP Choice Awards 2021	Male Promising Star of the Year	—N/a	Won	
2022	6th Asia Pacific Luminare Awards	Asia's Most Promising Love Team of the Year (shared with Alexa Ilacad)	—N/a	Won	
2022	Star Magical Christmas	METRO Best Couple (shared with Alexa Ilacad)	—N/a	Won	
2022	Star Magical Christmas	METRO Best in Costume Male	—N/a	Won	
2022	RAWR Awards 2022	Breakthrough Artist of the Year (shared with Alexa Ilacad)	—N/a	Won	
2022	RAWR Awards 2022	Digital Series of the Year	Run To Me	Won	
2022	RAWR Awards 2022	Love Team of the Year (shared with Alexa Ilacad)	—N/a	Won	
2022	RAWR Awards 2022	Fan Club of the Year (shared with Alexa Ilacad)	—N/a	Won	
2022	2022 Tag Awards Chicago	Best Love Team (Bronze) (shared with Alexa Ilacad)	—N/a	Won	
2023	2023 Tag Awards Chicago	Tag 25 Under 25 (Rank #1)	—N/a	Won	
2023	4th VP Choice Awards	Fandom of the Year (shared with Alexa Ilacad)	—N/a	Nominated	
2023	4th VP Choice Awards	Love Team of the Year (shared with Alexa Ilacad)	—N/a	Nominated	
2023	4th VP Choice Awards	Promising Male Star of the Year	—N/a	Won	
2023	8th Push Awards 2022	Push Popular Love Team of the Year (shared with Alexa Ilacad)	—N/a	Won	
2023	Anak TV Awards 2023	Anak TV Net Makabata Star (Male)	—N/a	Won	
2024	16th PMPC Star Awards for Music	Male Pop Artist of the Year	—N/a	Nominated	
2024	37th Awit Awards	Best Inspirational Recording (shared with Jamie Rivera, Jed Madela & Francine Diaz)	—N/a	Nominated	
2024	5th VP Choice Awards	TV Actor of the Year (Afternoon)	—N/a	Won	
2024	Anak TV Awards 2024	Anak TV Net Makabata Star (Male)	—N/a	Won	

=== Music Awards ===
Year	Award Ceremony	Category	Nominated work/s	Result	Ref.
2021	12th PMPC Star Awards for Music	New Male Recording Artist of the Year	One of Many	Nominated	
2022	35th Awit Awards	Best Christmas Recording	Holiday Love	Nominated	
