= Elisse Joson =

Filipino actress (born 1996)

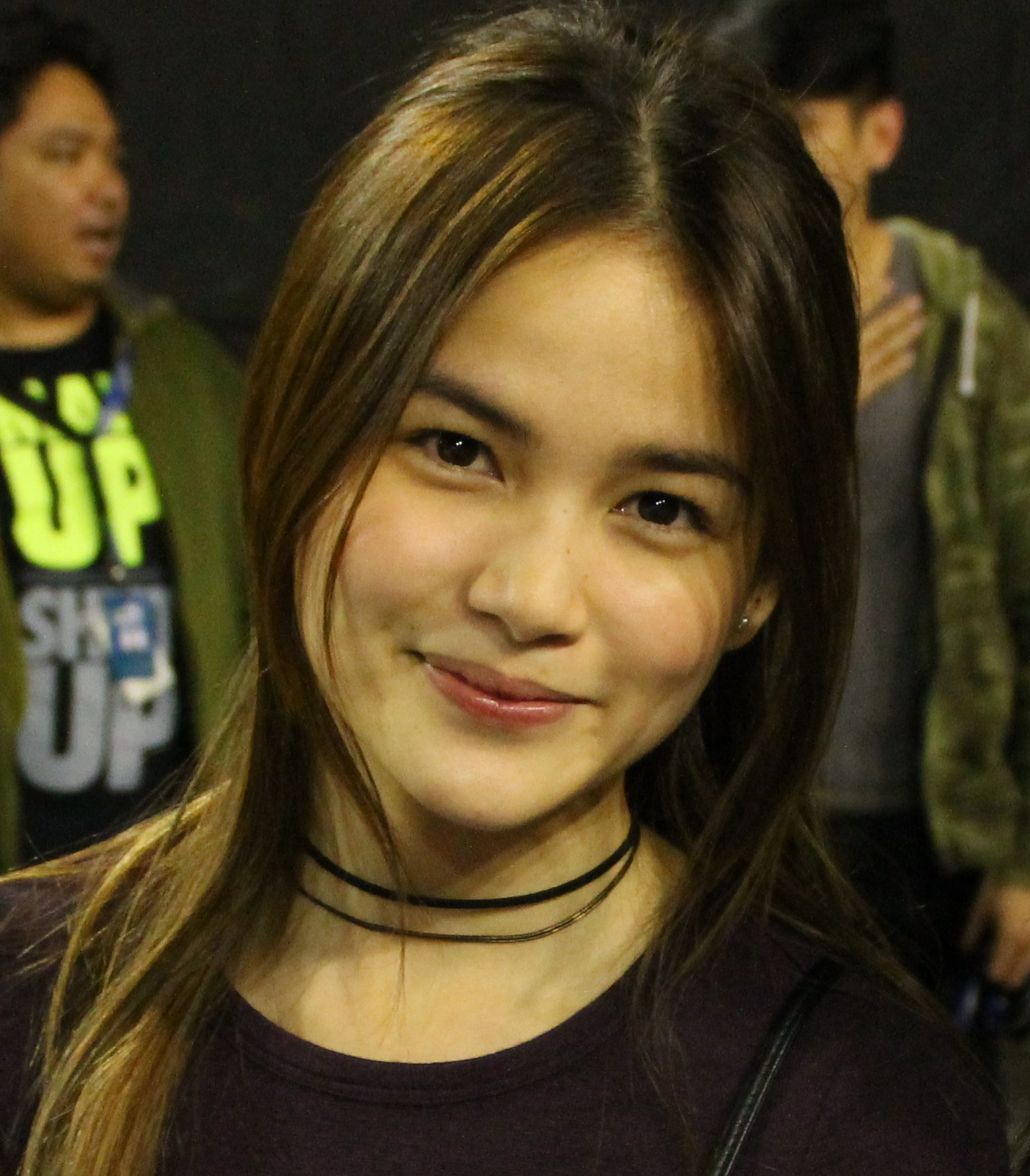
- Born: Maria Chriselle Elisse Joson Diuco; January 6, 1996 (age 30); Balanga, Bataan, Philippines
- Education: De La Salle-College of Saint Benilde
- Occupation: Actress
- Years active: 2012–present
- Agent: Star Magic (2012-present)
- Children: 1

Maria Chriselle Elisse Joson Diuco (Tagalog: [ʔeˈlɪs ˈhosɔn]; born January 6, 1996) is a Filipino actress.

She is known for her roles in ABS-CBN dramas such as FPJ's Ang Probinsyano and The Good Son. She rose to prominence following her appearance on Pinoy Big Brother: Lucky 7.

== Early life and education ==
Maria Chriselle Elisse Joson Diuco was born on January 6, 1996 in Balanga, Bataan. She is the only daughter of an anesthesiologist and single mother, Christine Joson, and an estranged father. She attended Bataan Montessori School during her elementary school years.

At a young age of 7, Joson attended various acting and singing workshops where she was deemed to be shy. Joson's family later migrated from the Philippines to the United States and lived there for a few years. She attended Inderkum High School during her high school years in Sacramento, California. While living there, she experienced bullying for not being able to speak English fluently. This experience, however, allowed her to gain confidence in herself. Upon moving back to Manila, she used this newfound confidence and fully pursued her passion for acting. At 16, she then became one of ABS-CBN's pool of Star Magic artists, and she enrolled in Quezon City Science High School, finishing with honors.

She studied AB Fashion Design and Merchandising at De La Salle-College of Saint Benilde. Her interest for fashion is influenced by the works of Alexander McQueen.

== Career ==
Joson began in the local entertainment industry at the age of 16. In 2012, she was the leading lady of singer Jovit Baldivino, in the music video of the latter's song, "Tell Me". In 2013, she became a familiar face as she appeared in various shows and dramas as a supporting actress, such as Cheska in the daytime television series Be Careful With My Heart. She also starred as Erica in the primetime TV series Sana Bukas pa ang Kahapon starring Bea Alonzo and Paulo Avelino.

In 2014, she starred as one of the 'mean girls' in the teen romantic, comedy-drama film, She's Dating the Gangster starring Kathryn Bernardo and Daniel Padilla.

In 2015, she made her first digital movie (Indie film) Saranghaeyo #Ewankosau with Barbie Forteza and Francis Magundayao. The film recognized her as one of the nominees for the 'New Movie Actress of the Year' category in the 32nd PMPC Star Awards for Movies.

She then became a part of the teen-oriented show Luv U as Divina and the primetime television series You're My Home as Alexis Madrigal.

Her biggest break in the entertainment industry was her McDonald's Philippines TV ad in 2016. The fast food chain's campaign, "Tuloy Pa Rin," promoted the concept of welcoming change and moving forward after a heartbreak to ultimately become a stronger and more independent individual. Due to its relatable "hugot" appeal, the ad went viral worldwide. It currently holds almost 2 million views on YouTube. In the same year, Joson became a part of the "lucky" group of housemates in the reality TV series Pinoy Big Brother: Lucky 7.

She joined the extended cast of FPJ's Ang Probinsyano in 2016, where she played the role of Lorraine, the cousin of SPO2 Jerome Gerona Jr. played by John Prats. In 2017, Joson joined the ensemble cast of the drama series The Good Son. Shortly after, she played Roxanne in the series Ngayon at Kailanman, the childhood friend and love interest of the lead actor and her The Good Son co-star Joshua Garcia.

Joson starred in the TV series Sandugo as Grace Policarpio, the love interest of the characters of Ejay Falcon and Aljur Abrenica.

In 2023, she starred as the antagonist in the TV series Dirty Linen and played the main antagonist in the afternoon drama series Pira-Pirasong Paraiso.

== Personal life ==
Joson has a daughter, Felize McKenzie (born April 10, 2021) with her screen partner McCoy de Leon. They were in a relationship from 2016 to 2018. After reconciling in 2020, they broke up again in 2025.

== Acting credits ==
=== Film ===
Key
†	Denotes films that have not yet been released

Elisse Joson's film credits with year of release, film titles and roles
Year	Title	Role	Ref.
2013	Bakit Hindi Ka Crush Ng Crush Mo?	Isa	
2014	She's Dating the Gangster	Mean Girl	
2015	#Ewankosau Saranghaeyo	The Lovely Princess	
2015	Everyday I Love You	Andrea Alfaro/Ethan's Sister	
2017	Extra Service	Julia	
2017	Ang Panday	Rowena/Flavio's Sister	
2019	Sakaling Maging Tayo	Malaya ''Laya'' Ocampo	
2019	You Have Arrived	Arianne	
2019	Yours Truly, Shirley	Supporting Role	
2019	The Mall, The Merrier	Mola Molina	
2021	Will you Marry?	Sweet	
2021	Izla	Venus	
2022	HabangBuhay	Bea	
2023	Mallari	Felicity	
2025	Best Served Cold	Gwen	

=== Television ===
Key
†	Denotes shows that have not yet been aired

Elise's Joson's television credits with year of release, title(s) and role
Year	Title	Role	Notes	Ref.
2012	Wansapanataym	Lambana	Episode: "The Fairy Garden"	
2012	Maalaala Mo Kaya	Ruby	Episode: "Cards"	
2013	Be Careful With My Heart	Cheska		
2013	Maalaala Mo Kaya	Joan	Episode: "Gown"	
2013	Kahit Konting Pagtingin	Party Guest		
2013	Maynila	Joy	Episode: "Love Thy Neighbor"	
2014	Maalaala Mo Kaya	Donna's friend	Episode: "Cellphone"	
2014	Wansapanataym	Shannon	Episode: "My App #Boyfie"	
2014	Forevermore	Wedding Guest		
2014	Sana Bukas pa ang Kahapon	Erica		
2015	Luv U	Divina		
2015	Maalaala Mo Kaya	Jenny	Episode: "Eye Glasses"	
2015	Maalaala Mo Kaya	Prima's friend	Episode: "Bintana"	
2015	Ipaglaban Mo!	Pam	Episode: "Tinalikurang Pangako"	
2015	Wansapanataym	Brenda	Episode: "Fat Patty"	
2015	You're My Home	Alexis Madrigal		
2016	Pinoy Big Brother: Lucky 7	Herself / Housemate		
2016	FPJ's Ang Probinsyano	Lorraine Pedrosa-Girona		
2017	The Good Son	Sabina De Guzman		
2018	Wansapanataym	Stella Ortiz	Episode: "Ofishially Yours"	
2018	Ipaglaban Mo!	Aliana Flores	Episode: "Ganti"	
2018	Maalaala Mo Kaya	Margielyn Didal	Episode: "Skateboard"	
2018	Ngayon at Kailanman	Roxanne Constantino / Christina Mapendo		
2019	Maalaala Mo Kaya	Ancel	Episode: "Painting"	
2019	Maalaala Mo Kaya	Shareena Paredes-Monzon	Episode: "Hot Choco"	
2019	Sandugo	Grace Policarpio		
2020	Ampalaya Chronicles	Nina		
2020	Beauty and the Boss	Stella		
2021	Love on da Move			
2021	Horroscope	Clarissa		
2022	The Goodbye Girl	Julia		
2022	Maalaala Mo Kaya	Joy	Episode: "Pulseras"	
2023	Dirty Linen	Sophie Madrigales		
2023	Pira-Pirasong Paraiso	Hilary Guinto-Abiog / Katrina "Trina" Ledesma		
2025	Saving Grace	Jessica Valdez		
2025	FPJ's Batang Quiapo	teen Matilde "Tindeng" Asuncion		
2026	The Loyalty Game	Bridgette Tangcoy		

== Accolades ==
Awards and nominations received by Elisse Joson
Award (Note: Awards, festivals, honors and other miscellaneous organizations are listed in alphabetical order.)	Year (Note: Indicates the year of ceremony. Each year is linked to the article about the awards held that year, wherever possible.)	Category	Nominated work	Result	Ref.
2016	32nd PMPC Star Awards for Movies	New Movie Actress of the Year	#Ewankosau Saranghaeyo	Nominated	
2016	3rd Star Cinema Online Awards	Favorite Breakthrough Love Team with McCoy de Leon	—N/a	Won	
2016	ASAP Pop Viewers' Choice Awards	Pop Love Teens with McCoy de Leon	—N/a	Nominated	
2016	The 4th Annual Hello Asia Awards!	Pinoy Artist of the Year with McCoy de Leon	—N/a	Won	
2017	2017 Box Office Entertainment Awards	Most Promising Loveteam of the Year with McCoy de Leon	—N/a	Won	
2017	PEP'sters Choice Awards	Female Breakout Star of the Year	—N/a	Won	
2017	Push Awards	Push Celebrity Fashionista of the Year	—N/a	Won	
2017	Push Awards	Push Newcomer	—N/a	Nominated	
2017	The 4th Annual Star Cinema Awards	Ultimate Team – McLisse (McCoy de Leon and Elisse Joson)	—N/a	Won	

== See also ==
- List of Filipino actresses
- Cinema of the Philippines
- Television in the Philippines
