= Bola Bola (miniseries) =

Philippine teen romantic comedy television miniseries

- Bola Bola Official Poster
- Also known as: Anne Geronga's Bola Bola: Cook, Feed, Love, Repeat
- Genre: Romantic comedy; Teen drama
- Based on: Bola-Bola by Anna Geronga
- Directed by: JP Habac
- Starring: Francine Diaz; Akira Morishita; KD Estrada; Ashton Salvador
- Opening theme: "Mahal Na Kita" by BGYO
- Composers: Akira Morishita, Jonathan Manalo
- Country of origin: Philippines
- Original languages: Filipino; English
- No. of episodes: 6

Production
- Production locations: Tagaytay, Cavite
- Camera setup: Single-camera
- Running time: 35–50 minutes
- Production companies: Dreamscape Entertainment; KreativDen Entertainment

Original release
- Network: iWantTFC
- Release: March 26 – April 10, 2022

Bola Bola is a Philippine teen romantic comedy television miniseries with a tagline "Cook, Feed, Love, Repeat" based on the best selling romance-novel of the same name by Anna Geronga, starring Francine Diaz, together with Akira Morishita of the Filipino boy group BGYO, KD Estrada and Ashton Salvador, directed by JP Habac, who has worked also with the romance films I'm Drunk, I Love You, Sakaling Maging Tayo, Dito At Doon and the hit BL series Gaya sa Pelikula. The series premiered on iWantTFC on March 26, 2022.

== Synopsis ==
What happens when you fall in love with your Kuya's best friend? Thea Balderama, a 220-pound late bloomer, believes that she will never meet her mother's incredibly high standards for beauty. Worse, while Thea deals with her deep-seated insecurities about her weight, she must also study to get into her dream university while keeping up with her boy-crazy best friends. Her life becomes even more complicated when Lucas Benitez, her Kuya's best friend, (and her longtime crush!), returns from the States. As her attraction to Lucas grows, Thea cooks for him, pouring her passion into irresistible merienda, hoping to reach her crush’s heart through his stomach, in the hopes that he will think she's beautiful—fat and all. Though Thea knows nothing is a piece of cake, she has a hopeful heart, and she's hungry for love. Being with Lucas might just be worth the risk.

== Cast and characters ==
All of the cast and characters are adapted from the trailer released by iWantTFC in YouTube, unless otherwise noted.

=== Main cast ===
- Francine Diaz as Thea Balderama
- Akira Morishita as Lucas Benitez
- KD Estrada as Julian Sarmiento
- Ashton Salvador as Josh Beltran

=== Supporting cast ===
- Arlene Muhlach as Anj Balderama
- Vance Larena as Anton Balderama
- Beyoncé as Lara Bowhead (guest)
- Lito Pimentel as Ricardo Balderama
- J-Mee Katanyag as Cely
- Analain Salvador as Issa
- Danica Ontengco as Ivy
- Albie Casiño

== Episodes ==
No.	Title	Original release date
1	"Chocolates Are a Girl's Best Friend"	March 26, 2022
A typical summer break for Thea and her friends gets interesting when her childhood crush Lucas returns home from studying abroad.
2	"Pasta Chronicles Volume 1"	March 27, 2022
Thea pressures Julian to join Lucas' band as road manager for a chance to get closer to him. With much confidence, she asks Lucas to be her date to the summer ball.
3	"Pasta Chronicles Vol. 2"	April 2, 2022
Thea wallows in self-pity after being rejected by Lucas, but she pulls herself together to prepare for the culinary competition that she signed up for. Issa convinces Thea to go to the ball and show their support to Julian.
4	"Don’t Panic, It’s Organic"	April 3, 2022
Anj blames herself for Thea's insecurity. Lucas' rejection opens Thea's eyes and motivates her to lose weight. She signs up in Anton's gym but is faced with the harsh reality that losing weight does not happen overnight.
5	"Zero Calories, Zero Substance"	April 9, 2022
With her new and leaner look, Thea becomes more confident, and this wins her new friends and gains Lucas' attention. Issa encourages Julian to stop suppressing his feelings for Thea.
6	"Love’s Like a Box of Chocolates"	April 10, 2022
Julian opens up to Thea but is left with more questions. Thea reunites with her father, and with this comes realizations about herself, her insecurities, what makes her happy, and about true love and acceptance.

== Production ==
=== Background ===
The project was first announced on December 10, 2021, in a livestream event called as "iWantTFC Unwrapped".

=== Filming ===
In 2022, filming began and wrapped up on the same year.

== Marketing ==
The official teaser was released on February 25, 2022 and the full trailer of the series was released on March 17, 2022, via iWantTFC's social media accounts. The main casts of the series graced Magandang Buhay on March 14, 2022 and the ASAP Natin 'To stage on March 20, 2022, as part of "Bola Bola" promotion.

== Reception ==
Rafael Bautista of Nylon Manila shared in an article saying, "Bola Bola is opening up discussions of how body, weight loss, and what makes you happy isn't a one-dimensional discussion". He also praised the actors behind the series saying, "the show wouldn't impress if it weren't for the good acting from the cast, most especially Francine Diaz".

== Soundtrack ==
Bola Bola (Original Soundtrack)

Soundtrack album by BGYO, KD Estrada, Akira Morishita
- Released: March 25, 2022
- Recorded: 2022
- Studio: EP
- Genre: OPM, Soundtrack
- Length: 11:45
- Language: Filipino
- Label: Star Music
- Producer: Jonathan Manalo

On March 21, 2022 Star Music has revealed the official soundtrack of the series, and was released on March 25 of the same year.

Bola Bola (Original Soundtrack)
No.	Title	Writer(s)	Artist	Length
1.	"Mahal Na Kita"	Akira Morishita; Jonathan Manalo	BGYO	3:26
2.	"Mahal Ba Kita?"	KD Estrada	KD Estrada	4:35
3.	"Mahal Na Kita"	Akira Morishita; Jonathan Manalo	Akira Morishita	3:26
Total length:				11:45

== Release ==
=== Broadcast ===
The series premiered on March 26, 2022, via iWantTFC.

The series had its Philippine TV Premiere beginning August 21 to September 4, 2022, airing on Sunday primetime on Kapamilya Channel and A2Z. It will also airing on ABS-CBN web channel Kapamilya Online Live and international via TFC (The Filipino Channel).

== See also ==
- List of programs broadcast by ABS-CBN
- List of programs distributed by ABS-CBN Entertainment
- List of Kapamilya Channel original programming
- List of A2Z (TV channel) original programming
- List of iWantTFC original programming
- List of ABS-CBN original drama series
