= Loisa Andalio =

Filipino actress, singer and dancer (born 1999)

- Born: Josefina Loisa Francisco Andalio; April 21, 1999 (age 27); Parañaque, Metro Manila, Philippines
- Occupations: Actress; dancer; singer
- Years active: 2014–present
- Agent: Star Magic (2014–present)
- Spouse: Ronnie Alonte (m. 2025)
- Children: 1
- Relatives: Lucas Andalio (nephew)

Josefina Loisa Francisco Andalio-Alonte (Tagalog: [ˈloɪsa anˈdaljɔ]; born April 21, 1999) is a Filipino actress, dancer and singer. She was first seen on Philippine television in April 2014 as a housemate of the fifth regular season of Pinoy Big Brother, Pinoy Big Brother: All In, where she was dubbed as the "Talented Darling ng Parañaque". She starred in television shows such as Past, Present, Perfect? (2019), Unloving U (2021), Love in 40 Days (2022), and Pira-Pirasong Paraiso (2023), as well as films James and Pat and Dave (2020), and Friendly Fire (2024).

== Career ==
Andalio started as a member of a sing and dance girl group called 3G, formed in 2013.

In 2014, Andalio became one of the 18 contestants on Pinoy Big Brother: All In, the fifth regular season and the eleventh overall installment of Pinoy Big Brother. The season featured a combination of celebrities and non-celebrities vying for the title of PBB Big Winner. She was evicted on August 23, 2014, just missing out on a spot in the Big 4.

After leaving the Big Brother house, Andalio appeared in the afternoon soap opera Nasaan Ka Nang Kailangan Kita in 2015, starring alongside fellow ex-housemates Joshua Garcia and Jane Oineza, along with Vina Morales, Denise Laurel, and Christian Vasquez. She made her film debut in a supporting role as Mia in the movie Crazy Beautiful You. She later appeared in the comedy film Gandarrapiddo: The Revenger Squad, starring Vice Ganda, where she portrayed the character Velle.

In 2016, Andalio became a member of the all-female dance group GirlTrends, which frequently performed on the Philippine television show It's Showtime until 2017. She was also part of the group BFF5, along with Maris Racal, Kira Balinger, Ylona Garcia, and Andrea Brillantes, which performed on the Sunday variety program ASAP. Andalio also appeared in the primetime television drama My Dear Heart as Agatha Estanislao, the sibling of Bela Padilla's character.

In honor of Star Magic's 25th anniversary, Andalio, along with Julia Barretto, Liza Soberano, Kathryn Bernardo, Janella Salvador, Maris Racal, Sofia Andres, Sue Ramirez, Alexa Ilacad, Ylona Garcia, Andrea Brillantes, and Kira Balinger, was featured on the cover of the June 2017 issue of Metro Magazine as one of the "twelve hottest" young stars under Star Magic. She later became part of the cast of the primetime series The Good Son in the role of Hazel.

In 2018, Andalio released the single "Sasamahan Kita". Andalio also appeared in supporting roles in Be My Lady and The General's Daughter.

After years in supporting roles, Andalio starred in several web series on iWantTFC, such as Past, Present, Perfect? (2019), Unloving U (2021), and The Goodbye Girl (2022). She also played one of the main characters in her first starring film, James and Pat and Dave (2020), a sequel to Vince and Kath and James (2016).

Andalio signed an exclusive contract with ABS-CBN in February 2022. In 2023, she starred in the afternoon drama series Pira-Pirasong Paraiso, alongside Charlie Dizon, Alexa Ilacad, and Elisse Joson.

== Personal life ==
Loisa Andalio was born April 21, 1999, to her parents, Leonardo Q. Andalio and Sandie F. Andalio.

In November 2025, she married actor and former onscreen partner Ronnie Alonte, having been in a relationship with him since 2016. Their first child was born in 2026.

== Filmography ==
=== Film ===
Year	Title	Role	Notes
2015	Crazy Beautiful You	Mia	Supporting role
2017	Gandarrapiddo: The Revenger Squad	Velle	43rd Metro Manila Film Festival Official Entry
2018	Da One That Ghost Away	young Canturzia Colmenares	Supporting role
2018	Hospicio	Leslie	Main role
2018	Fantastica	Princess Rapunselya	44th Metro Manila Film Festival Official Entry
2020	James and Pat and Dave	Patricia "Pat" Reyes	Main role
2022	My Teacher	Erica	48th Metro Manila Film Festival Official Entry
2024	Friendly Fire	Hazel	Main role
2025	Ex Ex Lovers	SC	Main role
2025	Bilyarista	Aya	Main role
2025	Shake, Rattle & Roll: Evil Origins	Hermana Flor	51st Metro Manila Film Festival Official Entry
2026	3 Words	Beauty	Main role
2026	Midnight Girls	Winona "Wanna" dela Cruz Madlangawa	Main role

=== Television ===
Year	Title	Role	Notes
2014	Pinoy Big Brother: All In	Herself	Housemate
2015	Nasaan Ka Nang Kailangan Kita	Beatriz M. Natividad	Main Role
2015	Home Sweetie Home	Marianne	Guest
2015	Luv U	Cheska	Guest Role
2015	Ipaglaban Mo: Kapalit ng Pag-ibig	Olivia	Main Role
2015–present	ASAP	Herself / BFF5 member	Performer & Co-Host
2016–2017	It's Showtime	Herself / GirlTrends member	Main Cast
2016	Be My Lady	Margaret	Supporting Role
2016	Ipaglaban Mo: Sanib	Lanie	Main Role
2016	Maalaala Mo Kaya: Puno	Jona	Main Role
2016	Wansapanataym: Candy's Crush	Candy Balane	Lead Role
2016	Till I Met You	Kara	
2016	Maalaala Mo Kaya: Karnabal	Annie	Main Role
2017	Wansapanataym: My Hair Lady	Anna "Goldie" Agustin	Lead Role
2017	My Dear Heart	Agatha Estanislao	Supporting Role
2017	The Good Son	Hazel Castillo	Supporting Role
2018	Wansapanataym: Gelli In A Bottle	Gelli Alcantara	Lead Role
2018	Ipaglaban Mo: Katiwala	Libay	Lead Role
2018	Maalaala Mo Kaya: Sementeryo	Kikay	Main Role
2019	Maalaala Mo Kaya: Jersey	Agatha Uvero	Episode Guest
2019	The General's Daughter	Claire del Fierro	Supporting Role
2019	Past, Present, Perfect?	Young Shantal	Lead Role
2021	Unloving U	Fiona Acosta	Lead Role
2022	The Goodbye Girl	Mara	Lead Role
2022	Love in 40 Days	Jane Marasigan	Lead Role
2023–2024	Pira-Pirasong Paraiso	Baby Girl Guinto-Abiog / Maria Amanda "Amy" Barrameda-Paraiso	Lead Role

== Discography ==
=== Singles ===
Year	Track/Song Title	Album
2015	"Pag-Ibig" (with Jane Oineza)	Nasaan Ka Nang Kailangan Kita (Songs from the Heart)
2015	"Walang Iba" (with Jerome Ponce, Jane Oineza and Joshua Garcia)	Nasaan Ka Nang Kailangan Kita (Songs from the Heart)
2018	"Sasamahan Kita"	Loisa

== Awards and nominations ==
Year	Award giving body	Notable Work/s	Category	Result
2015	PMPC Star Awards for Television	N/A	PMPC Star Awards for TV Best New Female TV Personality	Nominated
2015	Push Awards 2015	N/A	Most Loved Group or Tandem (with Joshua Garcia)	Nominated
2015	Push Awards 2015	N/A	PushTweet Favourite New Comer	Nominated
2015	LionhearTV #RAWRAwards	N/A	Breakthrough Actress of the Year	Nominated
2016	MYX Music Awards	Ako'y Tinamaan Music Video	Favorite Guest Appearance in a Music Video (with Joshua Garcia)	Nominated
2016	ASAP Pop Teen Choice Awards 2016	N/A	Pop Sweetheart	Nominated
2016	29th Global Excellence Awards	GirlTrends	People's Choice for Female Dance Group (shared with fellow GirlTrend Members)	Won
2017	Push Awards 2017	N/A	Celebrity Fashionista of the Year	Nominated
2017	Yes! Magazine's Most Beautiful Stars	Herself	Top 100 Most Beautiful Stars	Included
2017	The 8th TV Series Craze Awards 2017	N/A	Most Promising Actresses of the Year (shared with Maris Racal)	Won
2017	International Emmy Kids Awards 2017	Wansapanataym: Candy's Crush	Kids: TV Movie/Mini-Series	Nominated
2018	Kids' Choice Awards	N/A	Favorite Pinoy Newbie	Won
2018	C1 Original Festival 2018	Hospicio	Best Actress Award	Nominated
2018	PMPC Star Awards for Television	Wansapanataym: Gelli in a Bottle	Best Horror/Fantasy Program	Won
2018	100 Most Beautiful Women 2018	Herself	Most Beautiful Women 2018	Included
2019	MOR Pinoy Music Awards	Sasamahan Kita	LSS Hit of the Year	Nominated
