= Unloving U =

2021 Philippine television romantic comedy series

- Genre: Romantic comedy Drama
- Written by: Kay Brondial
- Directed by: Easy Ferrer
- Starring: Loisa Andalio; Ronnie Alonte
- Music by: Emerzon Texon
- Country of origin: Philippines
- Original languages: Filipino; English
- No. of episodes: 6

Production
- Executive producers: Carlo Katigbak; Cory Vidanes; Roldeo Endrinal; Jamie Lopez; Ginny Monteagudo-Ocampo
- Producers: Ethel Manaloto-Espiritu; Kate Valenzuela
- Editor: Augie Balignasay
- Camera setup: Single-camera
- Production companies: Dreamscape Entertainment; KreativDen

Original release
- Network: iWantTFC
- Release: February 8 – February 13, 2021

Unloving U is a Philippine romantic comedy television miniseries starring Loisa Andalio and Ronnie Alonte. Directed by Easy Ferrer, the series premiered on iWantTFC on February 8, 2021 to February 13, 2021.

== Plot ==
Fiona’s true feelings towards her stepbrother Alfie is her most guarded secret. Her love remains undeclared even after their parents separated. Meeting again after three years, she discovers that her feelings towards him never waned and are stronger than ever. However, it gets more complicated with their feuding parents, a girlfriend, and band problems that are getting into the mix of emotions that is about to explode into a sweet symphony of love.

== Cast and characters ==
=== Main ===
- Loisa Andalio as Fiona Acosta
- Ronnie Alonte as Alfie Almeida

=== Supporting ===
- Gelli de Belen as Darlene Almeida
- Ariel Rivera as Henry Acosta
- KD Estrada as Jam
- Anji Salvacion as Waltz
- Sam Cruz as Jacklyn
- Ayeesha Cervantes as Lily
- Miko Gallardo as Juan
- Kate Yalung as Betty
- Ron Angeles as Mack
- Ji-An Lachica as Salve

== Episodes ==
No.	Title	Original release date
1	"Endings are Beginnings"	February 8, 2021
Fiona finally gets what she has always wished for - a complete, loving, and happy family. However, complications arise when she discovers that her feelings for her step brother Alfie is more than just brotherly love.
2	"A Girl in Trouble is a Temporary Thing"	February 9, 2021
Three years after their separation, Fiona and Alfie meet again, but with their reunion comes some major 'house' issues that they need to face.
3	"It's All Coming Back"	February 10, 2021
Free from the burdens of their past familial relationship, Fiona is hopeful that her romantic feelings towards Alfie will finally be noticed and reciprocated. The return of Alfie's mother, however, complicates things anew as she brings along the beautiful and accomplished girlfriend of Alfie.
4	"Don’t Stand So Close to Me"	February 11, 2021
Fiona decides to stop herself from falling further in love with Alfie, but their shared love for music pushes them even closer. As she struggles with her intensifying feelings, Fiona and Alfie's living condition catches Darlene's attention.
5	"Bizarre Love Triangle"	February 12, 2021
After Henry suffers a minor heart attack, Alfie convinces Darlene to let Henry and Fiona stay at his house. Fiona tries to keep her feelings in check but an unexpected mishap changes everything in her and Alfie's life.
6	"Kaya Pala" "The Reason Why"	February 13, 2021
Fiona chooses a less complicated new life, while Alfie goes soul searching to find out what is truly important in his. As they both move on with their lives, music finds its way to open and heal their hearts.

== Official soundtrack ==
Unloving U (Original Soundtrack)

Soundtrack album by various artists
- Released: January 22, 2021
- Recorded: 2020
- Genre: OPM, Indie pop, Soundtrack
- Length: 11:53
- Language: Filipino, English
- Label: StarPop
- Producer: Roque "Rox" Santos

Unloving U (Original Soundtrack)
No.	Title	Writer(s)	Artist	Length
1.	"Kaya Pala"	Trisha Denise Campañer	Loisa Andalio, KD Estrada, Sam Cruz, Anji Salvacion	2:53
2.	"Saves It"	KD Estrada	KD Estrada, Loisa Andalio	2:40
3.	"Keeps on Coming Back"	Acel Bisa van Ommen	Anji Salvacion	3:26
4.	"Kaya Pala"	Trisha Denise Campañer	Loisa Andalio	2:53
Total length:				11:53

== Production and release ==
The production is in lock-in taping due to the pandemic. The series was announced on the official YouTube channel of ABS-CBN.

== See also ==
- List of iWant TFC original programming
