= Marry Me, Marry You =

2021–22 Philippine television romantic comedy drama series

- Title card
- Genre: Family drama; Romantic comedy
- Written by: Genesis Rodriguez; Abi Lam Parayno; Camille de la Cruz; Wilbert Christian Tan
- Directed by: Dwein Baltazar; Jojo Saguin
- Starring: Paulo Avelino; Janine Gutierrez
- Music by: Cesar Francis Concio
- Composer: Jonathan Manalo
- Country of origin: Philippines
- Original language: Filipino
- No. of seasons: 2
- No. of episodes: 95 (list of episodes)

Production
- Executive producers: Carlo Katigbak; Cory Vidanes; Laurenti Dyogi; Roldeo Endrinal
- Producers: Erick Castillo Salud; Rondel Lindayag; Rafael Mercado; Jemila Jimenez
- Production locations: Diliman, Quezon City; Tagaytay, Cavite; Manila
- Editors: Aries Pascual; Godwin Lucena; Kathleen Chavez; Maria Ceazara Terrado-Vidallo
- Camera setup: Single-camera; Multi-camera
- Production company: Dreamscape Entertainment

Original release
- Network: Kapamilya Channel (Note: The series was also broadcast on Jeepney TV, A2Z, TV5 and TFC. It was also available on-demand via iWantTFC.)
- Release: September 13, 2021 – January 21, 2022

Marry Me, Marry You is a Philippine television drama romantic comedy series broadcast by Kapamilya Channel. Directed by Dwein Baltazar and Jojo Saguin, it stars Paulo Avelino and Janine Gutierrez. It premiered on the network's Primetime Bida line up on September 13, 2021. The series concluded on January 21, 2022, with a total of 2 seasons and 95 episodes.

== Premise ==
The story is about a couple who navigates the traditional expectations attached to marriage that extends beyond one's partner including their family and friends.

== Cast and characters ==
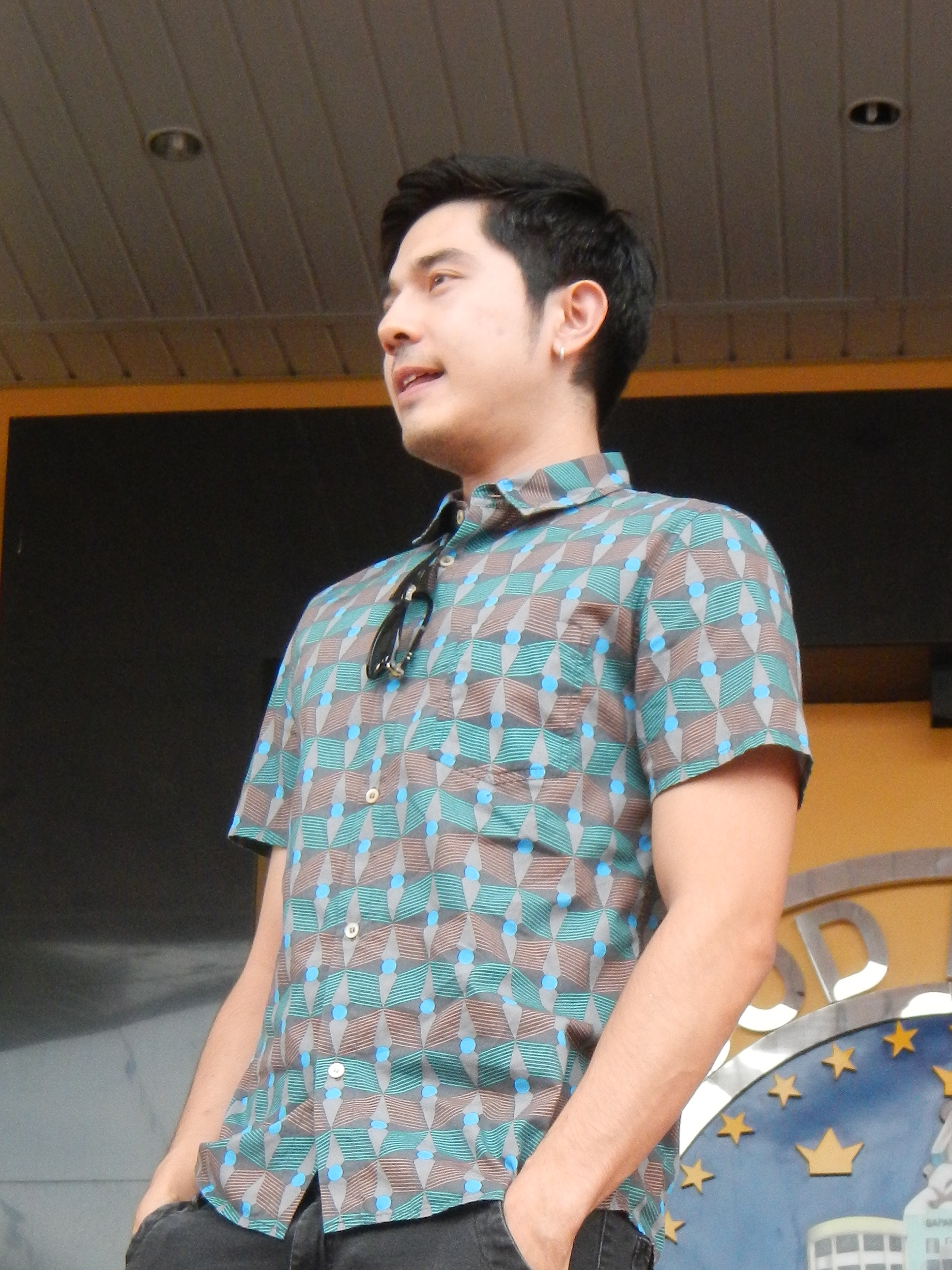
Paulo Avelino

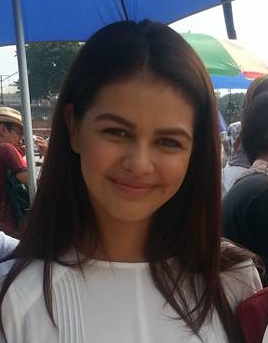
Janine Gutierrez

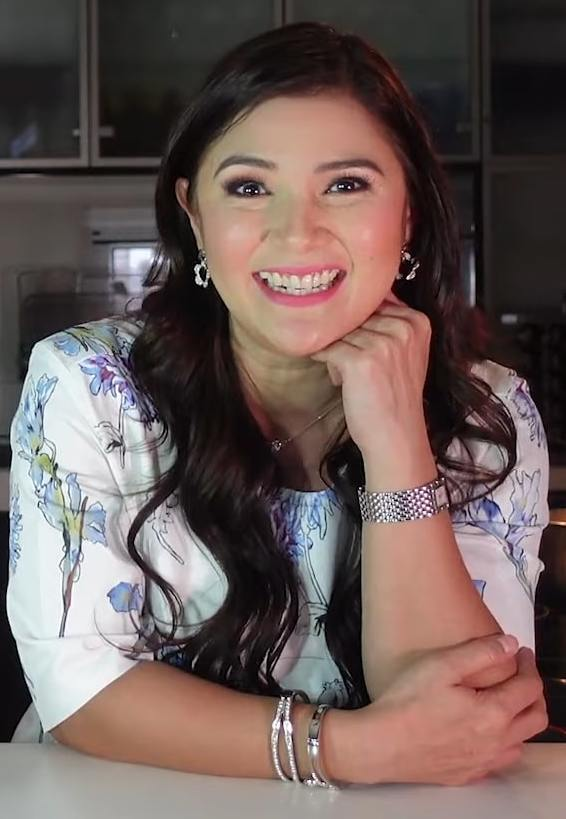
Vina Morales

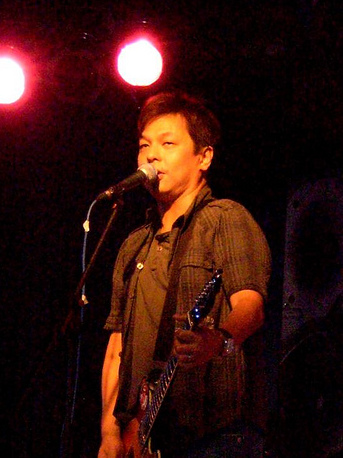
Jett Pangan

=== Main cast ===
- Paulo Avelino as Andrei P. Legaspi / Andrei M. Legaspi
- Janine Gutierrez as Camille Miraflor-Legaspi

=== Supporting cast ===
- Cherry Pie Picache as Elvira "Elvie" T. Manansala-Zamora
- Vina Morales as Marvi de Luna-Jacinto
- Sunshine Dizon as Maria Pauleene "Paula" Justiniano
- Edu Manzano as Emilio V. Legaspi
- Jake Ejercito as Cedric Banez
- Teresa Loyzaga as Laviña B. Cruz / Laviña O. Madrigal
- Lito Pimentel as Victor Zamora
- Joko Diaz as Aljo Nikolas Justiniano
- Jett Pangan as Michael "Myke" Jacinto
- Iana Bernardez as Patricia Francisco
- Adrian Lindayag as Kelvin M. Zamora

=== Recurring cast ===
- EJ Jallorina as Dexie Salazar
- Fino Herrera as Luke Dionisio
- Keann Johnson as Xavier C. Legaspi
- Meann Espinosa as Toni Lim
- Mariella Laurel as Bella Justiano
- Luis Vera Perez as Jomer D. Jacinto
- Angelica Lao as Jamie D. Jacinto
- Analain Salvador as Koleene Justiniano
- Joel Saracho as Martin Mercado
- Pontri Bernardo as Ben Francisco

=== Special participation ===
- Lotlot de Leon as Judith Miraflor

=== Guest cast ===
- Ana Abad Santos as Luisa Banez
- Arabella del Rosario as Nicki Banez
- Franco Daza as Atty. Ricardo Asunción
- Lao Rodriguez as Jason Arcadio
- Jenny Miller as Grace Dionisio
- Criza Taa as Erika Dionisio
- Darren Espanto as Wedding singer

== Production ==
Filming for the drama started in May 2021 with a lock-in taping set-up.

== Original soundtrack ==
Marry Me, Marry You (Original Soundtrack)

Soundtrack album by Various artists
- Released: August 27, 2021
- Recorded: 2021
- Genre: Soundtrack
- Length: 23:12
- Languages: Filipino; English
- Label: Star Music
- Producer: Jonathan Manalo

Marry Me, Marry You (Original Soundtrack)
No.	Title	Writer(s)	Artist	Length
1.	"Marry Me, Marry You"	Jonathan Manalo	Darren Espanto	2:48
2.	"Dreams Don't Wait"	Jonathan Manalo; Sabine Cerrado	KD Estrada	3:09
3.	"One Day"	Agatha Obar Morallos	Zephanie	4:50
4.	"Buo"	Trisha Denise Campañer	Anji Salvacion	3:27
5.	"Sila Pa Rin"	Angela Ken Rojas	Angela Ken	4:43
6.	"When It's All Over"	Sabine Cerrado	SAB	4:15
Total length:				23:12

== Timeslot change ==
The show originally aired weeknights at 9:30 PM PST. However, on November 15, 2021, after Huwag Kang Mangamba ended along with the premiere of Season 2, the show's timeslot was changed to 8:45 PM, with Viral Scandal taking over the show's previous timeslot.

This was the first television show starred by former GMA's actors Sunshine Dizon and Janine Gutierrez. The series also received low ratings according to AGB Nielsen Philippines.
