= Pira-Pirasong Paraiso =

2023–24 Philippine television drama series

- Season 1 title card
- Genre: Family; Romantic drama Crime
- Written by: Nathan Arciaga; John Joseph Tuason; Allan Cuadra; Airic Diestro
- Directed by: Raymund B. Ocampo; Roderick P. Lindayag
- Starring: Loisa Andalio; Charlie Dizon; Alexa Ilacad; Elisse Joson; Ronnie Alonte; Joseph Marco; KD Estrada
- Music by: Jessie Lasaten
- Opening theme: "Lipad ng Pangarap" by Regine Velasquez (Season 1)
- Ending theme: "Lipad ng Pangarap" by Regine Velasquez (Season 2-3)
- Composer: Arnel de Pano
- Country of origin: Philippines
- Original language: Filipino
- No. of seasons: 3
- No. of episodes: 161 (list of episodes)

Production
- Executive producers: Jane J. Basas; Guido R. Zaballero; Carlo L. Katigbak; Cory V. Vidanes; Laurenti M. Dyogi; Roldeo T. Endrinal
- Producers: Sienna G. Olaso; Hazel Bolisay-Parfan; Ronald D. Atianzar
- Editor: Froilan Francia
- Production company: Dreamscape Entertainment

Original release
- Network: Kapamilya Channel (Note: The series also aired on A2Z, Kapamilya Online Live, and on-demand via iWantTFC.); TV5
- Release: July 25, 2023 – January 27, 2024

Pira-Pirasong Paraiso (transl. Pieces of Paradise / International Title: Broken Paradise) is a Philippine romantic drama television series broadcast by Kapamilya Channel and TV5. Directed by Raymund B. Ocampo and Roderick P. Lindayag, it stars Loisa Andalio, Charlie Dizon, Alexa Ilacad and Elisse Joson. The series aired on Kapamilya Channel's Kapamilya Gold, Yes, Weekend! Saturday afternoon block and TV5's Hapon Champion and Weekend Trip Saturday afternoon block from July 25, 2023, to January 27, 2024.

== Plot ==
A con artist is hired to impersonate one of the long-lost sisters of a wealthy young woman. Drawn into a world of deception and conflicting motives, she is forced to confront questions of loyalty, identity, and what she is willing to ask.

== Cast and characters ==
Cast

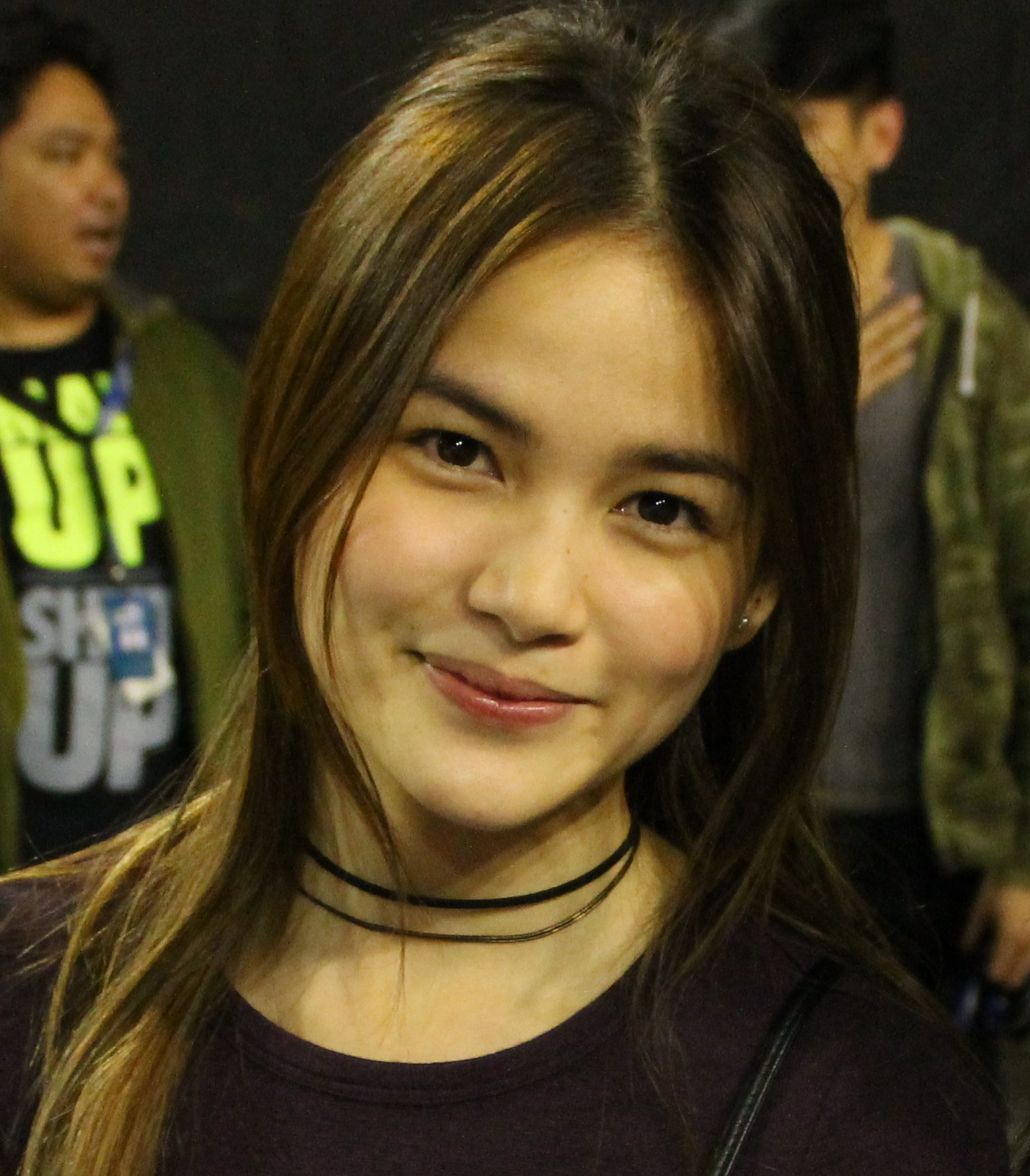
Elisse Joson

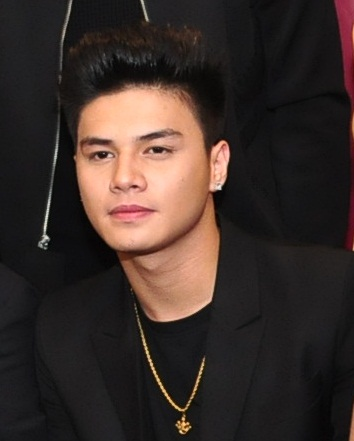
Ronnie Alonte

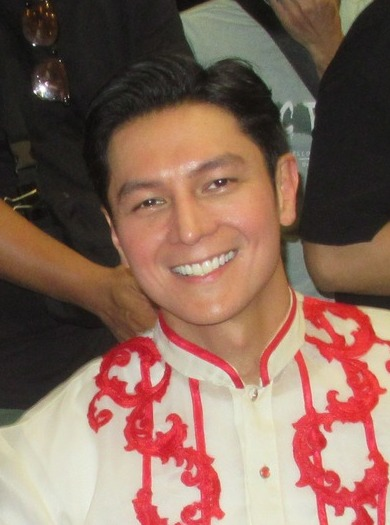
Joseph Marco

Lead cast

- Loisa Andalio as Baby Girl G. Abiog / Maria Amanda "Amy" B. Paraiso
- Charlie Dizon as Diana B. Paraiso-Lamadrid
  - Althea Ruedas as young Diana
- Alexa Ilacad as Angela Medina / Elizabeth Marie "Beth" B. Paraiso
  - Vrindarani Singh as young Beth/Angela
- Elisse Joson as Hilary G. Abiog / Rina
- Ronnie Alonte as PCMS Jonathan "Jonaf" Salvador (Note: Stepped down from the rank of PCMS at the police force, but was actually revealed to be an undercover mission against the syndicate.) (Note: Their ranks are shown accordingly to their uniforms, but were introduced by the rank of PSMS during an awarding ceremony, resulting in a continuity error.)
- Joseph Marco as Vladimir "Vlad" S. Lamadrid†
- KD Estrada as Elon S. Lamadrid

Supporting cast

- Maricel Soriano as Amanda S. Mendez-Barrameda†
- Snooky Serna as Jacinda Sebastian (Note: Removed from her judge position since Season 2.)
- Epy Quizon as Ambrosio Inarez "Badong" Abiog
- Sunshine Dizon as Rosalinda "Osang" Guinto-Abiog†
- Markus Paterson as Boy "Kano" G. Abiog / Michael†
- Rosanna Roces as Criselda "Bossing" Vizcarra†
  - Abi Kassem as young Criselda
- Art Acuña as Julius Lamadrid†
- Nikki Valdez as Carlota M. Barrameda
- Rafa Siguion-Reyna as Atty. Raffy Manalo
- Liza Diño as Elvira Cabrida
- Kate Alejandrino as Vera Alonzo
- Argel Saycon as PCMS Brian "Brix" Tolentino
- Archi Adamos as PLTCOL Alfredo Regalado
- Kobe Medalla as PCpl Rusty Meneses
- Lui Manansala as Almeda "Lola Miding" Salvador
- Hasna Cabral as Roxanne
- Marvin Yap as Remo "Emong" Calavera (Note: His name was originally Elmo according to the English subtitles, but was changed to Emong in the following episodes.)

Guest cast

- William Lorenzo as Emmanuel "Emman" Salvador†
- Sandy Aloba as Magdalena "Magda" Garrido†
- Gardo Versoza as Daniel Paraiso
  - Jao Mapa as young Daniel
- Maika Rivera as Elizabeth M. Barrameda-Paraiso†

== Promotion ==
To promote the series, the casts held a back-to-back caravan at Vista Mall in Bataan along with the cast of Nag-aapoy na Damdamin. The official full trailer of the series was released on July 10, 2023.

The show is co-produced respectively by ABS-CBN and TV5, but the latter discontinued their block time simulcast agreement with It's Showtime on June 30, 2023, which is also the date the agreement expired; along with the disagreements between the Eat Bulaga! hosts, which were led by the TVJ (Tito Sotto, Vic Sotto and Joey de Leon) and the production crew, and the new management of TAPE Inc. (which led to the former's TV5 transfer after their departure from it on May 31, 2023) and was eventually moved to GMA Network's sister channel GTV a day later, before expanding its simulcast to AMBS' All TV and GMA Network's main channel nearly a year later. Due to these moves, the cast of the new show was not allowed to promote it. As a result, they instead promoted both of these new afternoon teleseryes on Eat Bulaga! (then known by its interim title E.A.T.), TV5's new noontime show, which, ironically, had previously aired on ABS-CBN from 1989 to 1995.

== Accolades ==
Accolades received by Pira-Pirasong Paraiso
| Year | Awards ceremony | Title | Recipient | Result | Ref. |
|---|---|---|---|---|---|
| 2024 | VP Choice Awards | TV Series of the Year (Afternoon) | Pira-Pirasong Paraiso | Nominated | |
| 2024 | VP Choice Awards | TV Actress of the Year (Afternoon) | Loisa Andalio | Nominated | |
| 2024 | VP Choice Awards | TV Actress of the Year (Afternoon) | Alexa Ilacad | Won | |
| 2024 | VP Choice Awards | TV Actor of the Year (Afternoon) | KD Estrada | Won | |
| 2024 | VP Choice Awards | TV Actor of the Year (Afternoon) | Ronnie Alonte | Nominated | |
| 2024 | VP Choice Awards | Loveteam of the Year | Alexa Ilacad and KD Estrada | Nominated | |
