= List of iWant original programming =

iWant (briefly known as iWantTFC) is a Philippine over-the-top content streaming video on demand service owned and operated by ABS-CBN Corporation. It offers original series and movies, exclusive on-demand content based on ABS-CBN's entertainment productions, content from ABS-CBN's library, and live streams of ABS-CBN's broadcast properties.

== Original programming ==
=== Drama ===
Title	Genre	Premiere	Seasons	Runtime	Status
Spirits: Reawaken	Science fiction adventure	November 17, 2018	14 episodes	30–40 min	Miniseries
The End	Anthology	December 21, 2018	5 episodes	30–40 min	Miniseries
HIGH	Suspense drama	January 5, 2019	8 episodes	30–40 min	Miniseries
HUSH	Erotic anthology	January 23, 2019	1 season, 7 episodes	30–40 min	Pending
Project Feb 14	Romantic drama	February 16, 2019	6 episodes	20–30 min	Miniseries
Touch Screen	Anthology	March 6, 2019	3 episodes	20–30 min	Miniseries
Bagman	Crime thriller	March 20, 2019	2 seasons, 20 episodes	30–40 min	Ended
Mea Culpa: The Hidden Files	Mystery crime thriller	May 18, 2019	1 season, 30 episodes	30–40 min	Ended
Mga Batang Poz	Teen drama	July 26, 2019	1 season, 6 episodes	15–20 min	Renewed
Hinahanap-Hanap Kita	Romantic drama	October 5, 2019	8 episodes	20–30 min	Miniseries
Kargo	Crime drama	October 11, 2019	5 episodes	TBA	Miniseries
Uncoupling	Romantic drama	December 20, 2019	6 episodes	20–30 min	Miniseries
Story of My Life	Comedy drama	December 27, 2019	4 episodes	20–30 min	Miniseries
I Am U	Romantic thriller	February 21, 2020	7 episodes	TBA	Miniseries
The Tapes	Mystery crime drama	March 18, 2020	6 episodes	TBA	Miniseries
Beauty Queens	Family drama	July 15, 2020	6 episodes	TBA	Miniseries
La Vida Lena	Drama	November 14, 2020	10 episodes	30–50 min	Miniseries
Loving Emily	Romantic drama	November 18, 2020	7 episodes	TBA	Miniseries
Horrorscope	Horror drama anthology	January 13, 2021	1 season, 4 episodes	26–32 min	Pending
Click, Like, Share	Teen drama anthology	June 5, 2021	3 seasons, 12 episodes	26–46 min	Pending
My Sunset Girl	Romantic drama	July 14, 2021	6 episodes	TBA	Miniseries
Love Beneath the Stars	Coming of age / romantic drama	August 16, 2021	6 Episodes	TBA	Miniseries
Misis Piggy	Drama	April 25, 2022	6 episodes	22–35 min	Miniseries
Sleep with Me	Girls' love / romantic drama	August 15, 2022	6 episodes	21–26 min	Miniseries
Senior High	Coming of age / mystery / thriller drama	August 28, 2023	2 season, 55 episodes	23–39 min	Ended
Fractured	Thriller drama	September 15, 2023	8 episodes	TBA	Miniseries
Maalaala Mo Kaya	Anthology	April 24, 2025	13 episodes	47–71 min	Ended
True Manila Encounters	Horror / anthology	October 29, 2026	6 episodes	TBA	Ongoing

=== Comedy ===
Title	Genre	Premiere	Seasons	Runtime	Status
Alamat ng Ano	Fantasy comedy anthology	November 16, 2018	10 episodes	15–20 min	Miniseries
ZEKElingMagingSHEILA: The Zeke and Sheila's Almost Love Story	Romantic comedy	February 15, 2019	3 episodes	30–40 min	Miniseries
Jhon en Martian	Science fiction / romantic comedy	April 14, 2019	5 episodes	20–30 min	Miniseries
Past, Present, Perfect?	Coming of age / romantic comedy	May 31, 2019	1 season, 7 episodes	20–30 min	Renewed
Ang Babae sa Septic Tank 3: The Real Untold Story of Josephine Bracken	Comedy	July 17, 2019	7 episodes	20–30 min	Miniseries
Call Me Tita	Comedy drama	August 18, 2019	1 season, 8 episodes	20–30 min	Renewed
Taiwan That You Love	Romantic comedy	September 25, 2019	6 episodes	20–30 min	Miniseries
Manilennials	Comedy	December 16, 2019	12 episodes	20–30 min	Miniseries
Ampalaya Chronicles	Romantic comedy anthology	January 17, 2020	1 season, 3 episodes	1 h 30 min	Ended
My Single Lady	Romantic comedy	January 22, 2020	6 episodes	TBA	Miniseries
Fluid	Romantic comedy	March 13, 2020	4 episodes	TBA	Miniseries
Oh, Mando!	Romantic comedy	November 5, 2020	6 episodes	TBA	Miniseries
Bawal Lumabas: The Series	Comedy drama	December 14, 2020	6 episodes	TBA	Miniseries
Hoy, Love You!	Romantic comedy	January 18, 2021	3 seasons, 17 episodes	26–43 min	Pending
Unloving U	Romantic comedy	February 8, 2021	6 episodes	TBA	Miniseries
He's Into Her	Coming of age / romantic comedy	May 28, 2021	2 seasons, 26 episodes	40–87 min	Ended
The Goodbye Girl	Romantic comedy	February 14, 2022	6 episodes	TBA	Miniseries
Bola Bola	Romantic comedy	March 26, 2022	6 episodes	35–50 min	Miniseries
Run to Me	Romantic comedy	May 21, 2022	6 episodes, 1 special	30–40 min	Miniseries
Beach Bros	Coming of age / romantic comedy	July 16, 2022	6 episodes	30 min	Miniseries
Lyric and Beat	Musical, romantic comedy	August 10, 2022	8 episodes	50 min	Ended
Tara, G!	Coming of age / romantic comedy	October 7, 2022	10 episodes	50 min	Ended
Teen Clash	Coming of age / romantic comedy	March 17, 2023	10 episodes	45–50 min	Ended
Drag You & Me	Comedy drama	June 2, 2023	8 episodes	32–44 min	Ended
Love at First Spike	Coming of age sports romantic comedy drama	June 20, 2025	8 episodes	45–109 min	Ended
Ghosting	Fantasy romantic comedy	July 19, 2025	1 season, 16 episodes	21–29 min	Part 2 of season 1 Ended
Miss Behave	Coming of age / comedy drama	June 3, 2026	10 episodes	40–84 min	Ended
Nurse the Dead	Supernatural / comedy drama	June 12, 2026	8 episodes	22–36 min	Pending

=== Unscripted ===
==== Docuseries ====
Title	Premiere	Seasons	Runtime	Status
UAAP G.O.A.T. (Greatest Of All Teams)	December 5, 2018	3 episodes	10 min	Miniseries
iWant Retrospektib: The Making of Da King	December 14, 2018	6 episodes	15–20 min	Miniseries
TNT Boys: Journey to the World Stage	August 14, 2019	4 episodes	20–30 min	Miniseries
Unlisted	October 23, 2019	4 episodes	15-20 min	Miniseries
Dayories	November 19, 2019	3 episodes	18 min	Miniseries
The Last Manilaners: A Quezon's Game Documentary	January 27, 2020	4 episodes	25–31 min	Miniseries
Wreck Hunters	May 9, 2020	5 episodes	16–23 min	Miniseries
Trip to Quiapo	October 21, 2020	5 episodes	16–20 min	Miniseries
BINI Chapter 1: Born to Win	September 26, 2024	1 episode	1 h 29 min	Miniseries
BINI Chapter 2: Here With You	November 8, 2024	1 episode	1 h 2 min	Miniseries
BINI Chapter 3: Hanggang Dulo	June 12, 2025	1 episode	1 h 23 min	Miniseries
BINI World Tour Stories	September 23, 2025	6 episodes	29–47 min	Ended
Gamechangers	March 25, 2026	2 episodes	23–30 min	Ended

==== Reality ====
Title	Genre	Premiere	Seasons	Runtime	Status
Laureen on a Budget	Reality	November 17, 2018	1 season, 10 episodes	20 min	Ended
Find the Wasabi in Nagoya	Reality	December 8, 2018	5 episodes	20–25 min	Miniseries
Knorr Christmas Kitchen	Cooking show	October 28, 2020	6 episodes	21–33 min	Ended
Happy Place	Reality	October 30, 2021	13 episodes	22–26 min	Ended
Gandara The Beksplorer Season 2	Reality	December 15, 2023	TBA	TBA	Ended
Benta Nights	Stand-up comedy	November 19, 2025	6 episodes	28–32 min	Ended
AFAM Wives Club	Reality	November 11, 2025	8 episodes	32–55 min	Ended
BINIverse and Chorus	Reality/music	May 21, 2026	10 episodes	24–59 min	Ongoing
The Angeline Quinto Show	Talk show	August 27, 2026	TBA	TBA	Ongoing
Sparks Camp	Reality	September 16, 2026	TBA	TBA	Ongoing
Manila Martriarchs	Reality	November 10, 2026	8 episodes	TBA	Ongoing

=== Animation ===
Title	Genre	Premiere	Seasons	Runtime	Status
Jet and the Pet Rangers	Fantasy	April 3, 2020	7 episodes	TBA	Ended
Hero City Kids Force	Fantasy	November 6, 2021	13 episodes	3–4 minutes	Ended

=== Microdramas ===
Title	Genre	Premiere	Episodes	Runtime	Status
The Chambermaid's Daughter	Romantic comedy	April 30, 2026	2 season, 30 episodes	2–3 minutes	Ended
Twist of Fate	Romantic drama	May 30, 2026	28 episodes	2–3 minutes	Miniseries
Will You Fake Marry Me?	Romantic comedy	June 30, 2026	1 season, 30 episodes	2–3 minutes	Renewed
A Cake to Remember	Romantic comedy	August 28, 2026	1 season 30 episodes	2–3 minutes	Ended
Half Sisters	Comedy horror	September	30 episodes	2–3 minutes	Miniseries
The Perfect Wife	Drama	October 30, 2026	30 episodes	2–3 minutes	Miniseries
Dead Girl Walking	Romantic thriller	November 6, 2026	30 episodes	2–3 minutes	Miniseries
Coach Me Maybe	Romance/ Sports	November 25, 2026	30 episodes	2–3 minutes	Miniseries

== Upcoming original programming ==
=== Comedy ===
Title	Genre	Premiere	Seasons	Runtime	Status
Juan and Lily Run for SK	Romantic comedy	TBA	TBA	TBA	Pending

=== Drama ===
Title	Genre	Premiere	Seasons	Runtime	Status
Kahit Isang Saglit	Romantic drama	TBA	TBA	TBA	Pending
Ten Year Gap	Romantic drama	TBA	TBA	TBA	Pending
Boys Don't Cry	Crime thriller	TBA	TBA	TBA	Pending
Hotel 6	TBA	TBA	TBA	TBA	Pending
Besa	Crime thriller	TBA	TBA	TBA	Pending
Habitat	Science fiction / adventure drama	TBA	TBA	TBA	Pending

== Original films ==
=== Feature films ===
Title	Genre	Premiere	Runtime	Language
Must Date the Playboy	Romantic comedy	August 1, 2015	2 h	Filipino
Glorious	Romantic drama	November 17, 2018	1 h 47 min	Filipino
Ma	Horror	November 17, 2018	1 h 12 min	Filipino
Everybody Loves Baby Wendy	Comedy	December 5, 2018	1 h 17 min	Filipino
The Gift	Romance	January 11, 2019	1 h 26 min	Filipino
Spark	Romance	January 11, 2019	1 h 58 min	Filipino
Allergy in Love	Romantic comedy	January 25, 2019	1 h 29 min	Filipino
Apple of My Eye	Romantic drama	February 14, 2019	1 h 21 min	Filipino
MOMOL Nights	Romantic comedy	June 29, 2019	1 h 26 min	Filipino
Abandoned	Psychological horror	August 28, 2019	1 h 16 min	Filipino
Mga Mata sa Dilim	Action thriller	September 13, 2019	1 h 31 min	Filipino
You Have Arrived	Thriller	October 25, 2019	1 h 21 min	Filipino
Barbara Reimagined	Horror	November 8, 2019	1 h 5 min	Filipino
Silly Red Shoes	Romantic comedy	November 23, 2019	1 h 27 min	Filipino
Wild Little Love	Romantic comedy	November 27, 2019	1 h 33 min	Filipino
Ang Babae sa Septic Tank 3: The Real Untold Story of Josephine Bracken Movie Cut	Comedy	January 8, 2020	1 h 50 min	Filipino
Sunday Night Fever	Romantic drama	February 19, 2020	1 h 17 min	Filipino
Love Lockdown	Romantic thriller	May 15, 2020	1 h 10 min	Filipino
Belle Douleur	Romantic drama	May 20, 2020	1 h 38 min	Filipino
Ranger G	Documentary	May 23, 2020	1 h 22 min	English
Malaya	Romantic drama	May 28, 2020	1 h 47 min	Filipino
Sitsit	Horror thriller	October 31, 2020	1 h 43 min	Filipino
Quezon's Game (Note: This is considered an iWant original since they were part of the film production team in 2019.)	Biopic	January 27, 2021	2 h 5 min	Filipino
Tenement 66	Thriller	July 23, 2021	1 h 15 min	Filipino
He's Into Her: The Movie Cut	Coming-of-age romantic comedy	November 22, 2021	3 h 19 min (Note: Split in 2 parts)	Filipino/English
Whether the Weather Is Fine	Fantasy drama	February 9, 2022	1 h 44 min	Filipino
The Gatekeeper	Horror thriller	October 19, 2024	1 h 37 min	Filipino
Kontrabida	Action comedy	August 19, 2025	1 h 21 min	Filipino
Romance Reboot	Romantic drama	October 17, 2025	1 h 24 min	Filipino
The Last Resort	Romantic thriller	December 8, 2025	1 h 21 min	Filipino
Baka Doon sa Buwan	Comedy drama	December 28, 2025	1 h 19 min	Filipino
Young Blood	Fantasy comedy	April 28, 2026	1 h 32 min	Filipino

== Upcoming original films ==
=== Feature films ===
Title	Release date	Genre	Runtime	Notes
Glorious 2	TBA	Romantic drama	TBA	
Death Card	TBA	Action thriller	TBA	
Love Without Limits	TBA	Romance	TBA	
ATTY	TBA	Drama	TBA	
Commuters	TBA	Drama	TBA	
Feng Shui: Curse Reborn	TBA	Horror	TBA	

== Upcoming original microdramas ==
Title	Genre	Release date	Runtime
Conspiracy of Love	TBA	TBA	TBA
The CEO's Boy Toy	TBA	TBA	TBA
Bring Me	TBA	TBA	TBA
My Stepdaughter	TBA	TBA	TBA
Signed In Love	TBA	TBA	TBA
Bitter Wine	TBA	TBA	TBA
He Owns My Tomorrow	TBA	TBA	TBA
Blood Stained Promises	TBA	TBA	TBA
Her Mother's Silence	TBA	TBA	TBA
Block, Unblock, Repeat	TBA	TBA	TBA
The Heiress Switch	TBA	TBA	TBA
Picture Perfect Lies	TBA	TBA	TBA
Chasing Midnight	TBA	TBA	TBA
Born Into Secrets	TBA	TBA	TBA
Who Wore Black	TBA	TBA	TBA

== Live programming ==
=== Channels ===
==== Current ====
- ABC Australia (Note: Available both in the Philippines and globally.)
- A8 ESports
- ABS-CBN News Channel
- Black Belt TV
- Cine Mo! (Note: Available globally.)
- Cinema One
- CNA (Note: Available exclusively in the Philippines.) (2026–present)
- DZMM TeleRadyo (2010–2020, 2025–present)
- Euronews (2026–present)
- FashionTV
- GMA Life TV (Note: Available only outside of the Philippines.) (2023–present)
- GMA News TV (2023–present)
- GMA Pinoy TV (2023–present)
- Kapamilya Channel (2020–present)
- Knowledge Channel
- MOR Entertainment
- Myx America (Note: Available exclusively in North America.)
- Myx Philippines
- Scream Flix
- The Filipino Channel
- Toro TV
- TV Azteca
- UAAP Varsity Channel (2022–present)
- Univision

==== Former ====
- ABS-CBN (Note: Available until May 5, 2020 due to cease-and-desist order from the NTC after its legislative franchise expired on May 4.) (2010–2020)
- ABS-CBN Regional Channel (2016–2018)
- S+A (2014–2020)
- O Shopping (2013–2018)
- TeleRadyo (2020–2023)
- TeleRadyo Serbisyo (2023–2025)

===== Available only on iWant TV (2010–2018) =====
- Al Jazeera
- Asian Food Channel
- AXN
- Basketball TV
- Bloomberg Television
- Cartoon Network (2011–2018)
- CNN
- Colours (2012–2018)
- E!
- Food Network
- FYI
- History
- Hits (2013–2018)
- Jack TV
- Kix
- Lifetime
- Living Asia Channel
- MOR 101.9 Manila
- National Geographic
- Nickelodeon
- RTL CBS Entertainment
- Solar Sports
- Thrill
- Toonami (2013–2018)
- Travel Channel
- WarnerTV

=== Shows ===
Title	Genre	Premiere	Length	Status
Kabayani Talks Live	Talk show	2018	1 h	Ongoing
IKR (I Know Right?!)	Talk show	September 28, 2018	1 h	Ended
iWant ASAP	Musical variety show	December 2, 2018	2 hours	Ongoing
All Music: Artists at Home Sessions	Music	April 1, 2020	30–60 minutes	Ended
Tawa-tawa Together	Comedy	April 17, 2020	30 minutes	Ended
John Denver Trending Know	Talk	April 25, 2020	60 minutes	Ended
I Feel U	Talk show	May 10, 2020	54–56 min	Ended
We Rise Together!	Talk show	November 2, 2020	24–31 min	Ongoing

=== Specials ===
Title	Genre	Premiere	Length	Status
Pinoy Big Brother: Otso Livestream	Reality show	November 10, 2018	45 minutes	Ended
Camp Star Hunt Livestream	Reality show	November 10, 2018	30 minutes	Ended
UAAP Season 81	Sports	February 16, 2019	2 hours	Ended
ONE Championship	Sports	February 16, 2019	3 hours	Ongoing
Premier Volleyball League Reinforced Conference	Sports	May 26, 2019	2 hours	Ended
Maharlika Pilipinas Basketball League Lakan Season	Sports	June 12, 2019	7 hours	Ongoing
NCAA Season 95	Sports	July 7, 2019	6 hours	Ended
Premier Volleyball League Open Conference	Sports	August 11, 2019	6 hours	Ended
Premier Volleyball League Collegiate Conference	Sports	August 17, 2019	6 hours	Ended
UAAP Season 82	Sports	September 1, 2019	7 hours, 30 minutes	Ended
ASEAN Basketball League Season 10	Sports	November 16, 2019	2 Hours	Ended
2019 Southeast Asian Games	Sports	November 30, 2019	TBA	Ended
Pantawid ng Pag-ibig: At Home Together Concert (Note: Simulcast together with ABS-CBN, S+A, ANC, DZMM TeleRadyo, Jeepney TV, Myx, Metro Channel, Asianovela Channel, DZMM Radyo Patrol 630, MOR Philippines, and The Filipino Channel.)	Benefit concert	March 22, 2020	6 hours	Ended
Gorgeous Confident Queens	Beauty pageant	June 30, 2020	59 minutes	Ended
Ikaw ang Liwanag at Ligaya: The ABS-CBN Christmas Special 2020 (Note: Simulcast together with Kapamilya Channel, Kapamilya Online Live, A2Z, Kumu, KTX.ph, and The Filipino Channel.)	Christmas special	December 20, 2020	3 hours	Ended
UAAP Season 84	Sports	May 4, 2022 (Note: Only available in International territories)	2 hours	Ended
