= BGYO videography =

BGYO video discography
- Music videos: 21
- Digital videos: 1
- Films: 1
- Series: 3
- Television: 90
- Online shows: 10

Filipino boy band BGYO (formerly Star Hunt Academy Boys or SHA Boys) debuted on the music scene in January 2021. They have since released or featured 21 high quality music videos notable for synchronized dance moves and undeniable aesthetics. The group have appeared also in several commercials or advertisements for brands such as H&M, Sprite, Xiaomi, TNT, Mentos and Chowking, among others.

BGYO promoted their debut single "The Light" (2021) with a music video which garnered more than a million YouTube views, 6 days after its release, and its the fastest debut music video by a P-pop group to reach 1 Million views in YouTube. It also broke the record for being the "Most Liked Music Video in a Debut Song" by a P-pop group of all time.

== Music videos ==
=== 2020s ===
Music Video	Year	Other performer(s) credited	Director(s)	Description	Ref.
"The Light"	2021	None	Kring Kim		
"He's Into Her"	2021	None	Amiel Kirby Balagtas	Part of the original soundtrack for the series He's Into Her (Season 1).	
"Feel Good Pilipinas"	2021	KZ Tandingan	Edsel Misenas	Part of the ABS CBN Special Summer ID 2021.	
"While We Are Young"	2021	None	Unknown	Part of the Coke Studio Philippines (Season 4).	
"Runnin'"	2021	Keiko Necesario	Unknown	Part of the Coke Studio Philippines (Season 4).	
"The Baddest"	2021	Liza Soberano	Amiel Kirby Balagtas		
"When I'm with You"	2021	None	Amiel Kirby Balagtas		
"Kundiman"	2021	None	Amiel Kirby Balagtas		
"Up!"	2022	BINI	Mickey Perz, BINI, BGYO	Part of the original soundtrack for the docufilm BINI & BGYO Dubai Adventures: A Docufilm.	
"Best Time"	2022	None	Amiel Kirby Balagtas	Part of the original soundtrack for the series He's Into Her (Season 2).	
"Tumitigil Ang Mundo"	2022	None	Karlo Calingao	Part of the original soundtrack for the movie An Inconvenient Love.	
"Patuloy Lang Ang Lipad" (In Studio)	2022	None	Unknown	Part of the original soundtrack of the Darna (2022 TV series).	
"Magnet"	2022	None	Karlo Calingao		
"PNGNP"	2022	None	Amiel Kirby Balagtas		
"Patintero"	2024	None	Ken Tan		
"Gigil"	2024	None	Jonathan Tal Placido		
"Trash”	2024	Lou Yanong; Rina Maier	Kashka Gaddi		
"Divine"	2025				
"All These Ladies"	2025				
"Dance With Me"	2025				
"Fresh"	2026				

== Digital videos ==
Title	Year	Length	Digital Platform	Ref.
Be The Light: The BGYO Media Launch	2021	1 hour and 51 minutes	iWantTFC	

== Filmography ==
=== Film ===
Year	Title	Role	Notes	Ref.
2022	BINI & BGYO Dubai Adventures: A Docufilm	Themselves	Live premiere in Dolphy Theatre, Quezon City and simulcast via live streaming through KTX.ph	

=== Series ===
Year	Title	Role	Notes	Ref.
2021	ONE DREAM: The Bini - BGYO Journey	Themselves	9 episodes telecast worldwide via MYX Global's Myx TV and aired online via iWantTFC	
2022	Alas Netflix	Themselves	pilot episode and 2 succeeding instalment aired via Netflix Philippines YouTube Channel	
2022	He's Into Her Season 2	Themselves	BGYO have appeared on the finale episode as special guest on "The Benison Ball" and performed the original soundtrack of the season 2 "Best Time".	

=== Television ===
Year	Date	Title	Performed song(s)	Country	Ref.
2019	August 3	Pinoy Big Brother: Otso	"Bituin" (Maymay Entrata)	Philippines	
2020	October 18	ASAP Natin 'To	"On" (BTS)	Philippines	
2020	October 25	ASAP Natin 'To	"Phone Down" (Sam Concepcion)	Philippines	
2020	November 8	ASAP Natin 'To	"WIWU" (Markus Paterson and Moophs)	Philippines	
2020	November 22	ASAP Natin 'To	(Sarah Geronimo Hit Songs) "Tala" "Kilometro"	Philippines	
2020	November 29	ASAP Natin 'To	"Raise Your Flag" (KZ Tandingan and Kritiko)	Philippines	
2020	November 30	Magandang Buhay	"Phone Down" (Sam Concepcion)	Philippines	
2020	December 6	Pinoy Big Brother: Connect	"Pinoy Ako" (Orange and Lemons)	Philippines	
2020	December 12	It's Showtime	(Sarah Geronimo Hit Songs) "Tala" "Kilometro"	Philippines	
2020	December 13	ASAP Natin 'To	"Christmas Party"	Philippines	
2020	December 20	ABS-CBN Christmas Special 2020	Pre-show: "Raise Your Flag" (KZ Tandingan and Kritiko) "Christmas Party" "Sasamahan Kita" (Loisa Andalio) "Liwanag at Ligaya" Main Show: "Jingle Bell Rock" "Hataw Na" (Gary Valenciano)	Philippines	
2021	January 31	ASAP Natin 'To	"The Light"	Philippines	
2021	February 5	It's Showtime	"The Light"	Philippines	
2021	February 7	Be The Light: The BGYO Launch (Philippines Re-broadcast)	"Full Moon Youth" (Yuzon) "Bagong Simula" (Jem Macatuno) "Only Gonna Love You" (Kyla) "Paubaya" (Moira Dela Torre) "Go Higher" (Mikki Claver)	Philippines	
2021	February 13	Be The Light: The BGYO Launch (Worldwide Re-broadcast)	"Full Moon Youth" (Yuzon) "Bagong Simula" (Jem Macatuno) "Only Gonna Love You" (Kyla) "Paubaya" (Moira Dela Torre) "Go Higher" (Mikki Claver)	Philippines	
2021	February 25	Pinoy Big Brother: Connect	"The Light"	Philippines	
2021	February 26	Pinoy Big Brother: Connect	"The Light"	Philippines	
2021	March 7	ASAP Natin 'To	"The Light"	Philippines	
2021	March 8	We Rise Together	"The Light"	Philippines	
2021	March 9	Teleradyo - Sakto	"The Light"	Philippines	
2021	March 12	MYX Philippines - MYXclusive	"The Light"	Philippines	
2021	March 14	I Feel U	"The Light"	Philippines	
2021	March 14	ASAP Natin 'To	"Kulay" (Young JV)	Philippines	
2021	March 14	Pinoy Big Brother: Connect @ The Big Night	"The Light" - Rock Version	Philippines	
2021	March 21	ASAP Natin 'To	"Sasamahan Kita" (Loisa Andalio)	Philippines	
2021	March 22	Magandang Buhay (Re-broadcast)	"Phone Down" (Sam Concepcion)	Philippines	
2021	April 4	ASAP Natin 'To (Re-broadcast)	"Sasamahan Kita" (Loisa Andalio)	Philippines	
2021	April 9	K World: Better Together!	—N/a	Philippines	
2021	April 16	Cinema News	—N/a	Philippines	
2021	April 18	ASAP Natin 'To	"Drag Me Down" (One Direction)	Philippines	
2021	April 25	ASAP Natin 'To	"He's Into Her"	Philippines	
2021	May 16	ASAP Natin 'To	"Fly Away"	Philippines	
2021	May 17	Magandang Buhay	Feel Good Pilipinas	Philippines	
2021	May 23	ASAP Natin 'To	"Di Maiwasan" (#Hashtags)	Philippines	
2021	May 29	It's Showtime	"He's Into Her"	Philippines	
2021	May 30	ASAP Natin 'To	"He's Into Her"	Philippines	
2021	June 6	ASAP Natin 'To	—N/a	Philippines	
2021	June 6	TV5's - Idols of Pop: Manila Sound to KPop	—N/a	Philippines	
2021	June 20	ASAP Natin 'To	"Bitaw" (Rayver Cruz)	Philippines	
2021	June 21	BINI: The Launch - THE SHOWCASE (TV Premiere)	—N/a	Philippines	
2021	June 27	ALL FOR ONE (Canadian Multiculturalism Day)	"He's Into Her"	Philippines	
2021	July 4	ASAP Natin 'To	—N/a	Philippines	
2021	July 18	ASAP Natin 'To	"Isigaw Mo"	Philippines	
2021	August 1	ASAP Natin 'To	—N/a	Philippines	
2021	September 5	ASAP Natin 'To	"The Baddest"	Philippines	
2021	September 18	It's Showtime	"The Baddest"	Philippines	
2021	September 19	ASAP Natin 'To	"The Light"	Philippines	
2021	October 1	It's Showtime	"Kulay"	Philippines	
2021	October 10	ASAP Natin 'To	"When I'm with You"	Philippines	
2021	October 31	ASAP Natin 'To	—N/a	Philippines	
2021	December 12	ASAP Natin 'To	—N/a	Philippines	
2021	December 19	ASAP Natin 'To	"Kundiman"	Philippines	
2021	December 26	ASAP Natin 'To	—N/a	Philippines	
2022	January 16	ASAP Natin 'To	"Sasamahan Kita" (Loisa Andalio)	Philippines	
2022	March 6	ASAP Natin 'To	"Sabay"	Philippines	
2022	March 10	Magandang Buhay	"Sabay"	Philippines	
2022	March 13	ASAP Natin 'To	"Kulay"	Philippines	
2022	March 14	Magandang Buhay (Cameo)	—N/a	Philippines	
2022	March 27	I Can See Your Voice (Philippine season 4)	"Kundiman"	Philippines	
2022	April 2	It's Showtime	"Boom Panes" (Vice Ganda)	Philippines	
2022	April 2	Rated Korina	—N/a	Philippines	
2022	April 10	ASAP Natin 'To	—N/a	Philippines	
2022	May 2	Simply K-Pop	"The Light" "Best Time"	Philippines	
2022	May 9	Magandang Buhay (Re-broadcast)	—N/a	Philippines	
2022	May 15	ASAP Natin 'To	—N/a	Philippines	
2022	May 29	ASAP Natin 'To	"Fly Away"	Philippines	
2022	May 29	Pinoy Big Brother: Kumunity Season 10	(PBB Theme Songs Medley) "Kabataang Pinoy" "Pinoy Ako" "Sikat Ang Pinoy"	Philippines	
2022	June 5	ASAP Natin 'To	"Best Time"	Philippines	
2022	June 12	ASAP Natin 'To	"Up!"	Philippines	
2022	June 16	News5 Frontline sa Umaga	"Best Time"	Philippines	
2022	June 26	ASAP Natin 'To	—N/a	Philippines	
2022	July 3	ASAP Natin 'To	(BTS Hit Songs) "Butter" "Dynamite" "Permission to Dance"	Philippines	
2022	July 10	ASAP Natin 'To	"Pasa Diyos" (Young JV and Vice Ganda)	Philippines	
2022	July 14	Magandang Buhay (Re-broadcast)	"Sabay"	Philippines	
2022	July 17	ASAP Natin 'To	"Fly Away"	Philippines	
2022	July 24	ASAP Natin 'To	"Tumitigil Ang Mundo"	Philippines	
2022	July 31	ASAP Natin 'To	"Mahal Na Kita"	Philippines	
2022	August 3	He's Into Her Season 2 - Finale Episode	"Best Time"	Philippines	
2022	August 14	ASAP Natin 'To	"Patuloy Lang Ang Lipad"	Philippines	
2022	September 4	ASAP Natin 'To	"Patuloy Lang Ang Lipad"	Philippines	
2022	September 13	It's Showtime	"Tumitigil Ang Mundo"	Philippines	
2022	October 23	ASAP Natin 'To	"Tumitigil Ang Mundo"	Philippines	
2022	October 26	Magandang Buhay	"Patuloy Lang Ang Lipad"	Philippines	
2022	November 6	ASAP Natin 'To	"Mahal Na Kita" with Regine Velasquez	Philippines	
2022	November 13	ASAP Natin 'To	"Magnet"	Philippines	
2022	November 20	ASAP Natin 'To	"Shut Up" (Black Eyed Peas) with BINI	Philippines	
2022	December 17–18	ABS-CBN Christmas Special 2022	"Magnet" "Up!"	Philippines	
2023	January 29	ASAP Natin 'To	—N/a	Philippines	
2023	February 5	ASAP Natin 'To	"Be Us"	Philippines	
2023	February 12	ASAP Natin 'To	"Tumitigil Ang Mundo" with AC Bonifacio, Sheena Belarmino and Krystal Brimmer	Philippines	
2024	December 2	It's Showtime	"Andito Lang"	Philippines	
2025	February 17	It's Showtime	—N/a	Philippines	
2025–2026	December 14	Your Face Sounds Familiar (season 4)	"Last Christmas" by Backstreet Boys		

=== Online shows ===
Year	Title	Network	Note(s)	Ref.
2020	BGYO on Kumu Live (as SHA Boys)	Kumu	3 episodes per week	
2021	BGYO on Kumu Live	Kumu	3 episodes per week	
2021	MYX Spotlight Artist for April	MYX Philippines	5 episodes	
2021	Coke Studio Itodo Mo Beat Mo with BGYO and Keiko Necesario - Part 1	Coke Studio Philippines	7 episodes	
2021	Coke Studio Itodo Mo Beat Mo with BGYO and Keiko Necesario - Part 2	Coke Studio Philippines	3 episodes	
2021	ONE DREAM: Virtual Hangout	iWantTFC YouTube Channel	9 episodes	
2021	MTV Asia Spotlight Artist for October and November	MTV Asia	9 episodes	
2021	Annyeong Korea Trivia: #KoreaTayoSoon	KTO Manila YouTube Channel	10 episodes	
2022	BGYO on the Go	ABS-CBN, YouTube	11 episodes	
2022	MYX Hits Different	MYX Global	1 episode	
2023	BINI & BGYO USA Adventures	ABS-CBN, YouTube	20 episodes	
