= Gelo Rivera =

Filipino singer-songwriter (born 2001)

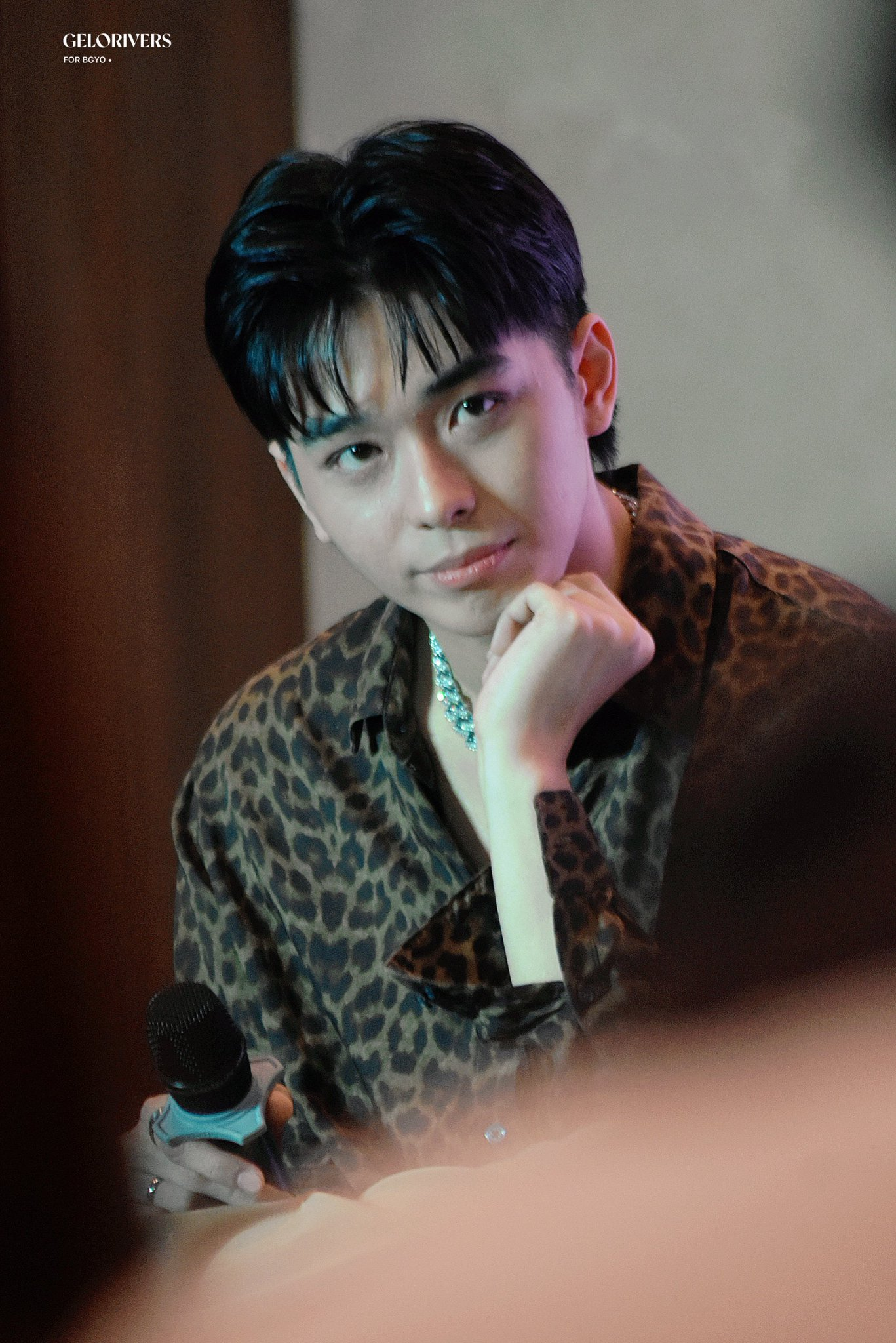
- Rivera in January 2023
- Born: Angelo Troy Rivera; 18 April 2001 (age 25); Pasay, Philippines
- Occupations: rapper; singer; songwriter; actor
- Years active: 2018–present
- Agent(s): Star Hunt (2018–2020); Star Magic (2020–present)
- Known for: Leader of BGYO; The Four Bad Boys and Me; The Chambermaid's Daughter
- Musical career
- Genre: P-pop
- Instrument: Vocals
- Labels: Star Music; Old School Records

Angelo Troy Rivera (born April 18, 2001) is a Filipino singer-songwriter, rapper, actor, and dancer. He is the leader of the Filipino boy group BGYO, under Star Music.

Prior to his music career, Rivera was a part of the Philippines hip-hop dance crew named A-Team, competing locally and internationally.

Born in Pasay, Rivera began his acting career in 2025 when he became part of the film adaptation of the Wattpad story, The Four Bad Boys and Me, and in 2026, on ABS-CBN Studios' first vertical drama series, The Chambermaid's Daughter. Rivera has also been active in fashion, making his runway debut in 2023 at .ARCHIVES' ARC 02: Digital Oasis fashion show and later appearing in fashion publications and events.

== Early life ==
Angelo Troy Rivera was born on the 18th of April 2001, in Pasay City, Philippines. He grew up listening to Ne-Yo, Usher and Chris Brown. While studying, Rivera trained in hip-hop and dance sport, and later became part of the A-Team. He initially thought Star Hunt Academy (SHA) was a dance-related project, but accepted the opportunity after learning more about its concept.

== Career ==
=== 2018–2022: Career Beginnings, Star Hunt Academy and debut with BGYO ===
In 2018, Rivera was preparing to travel to Arizona, United States for a hip hop dance competition when he was scouted by a Star Hunt Academy coach and invited to audition for the program alongside JL Toreliza. He later became part of the "SHA Boys". Rivera and his four future BGYO members trained for two years under Filipino and South Korean mentors from MU Doctor Academy, as well as vocal coach Kitchy Molina and dance coach Mickey Perz. In an interview with Koukyouzen, Gelo said he developed his rap skills during the training period. The trainees were introduced during the pre-show of the PBB Otso Big Night on August 3, 2019. Gelo debuted as a member of BGYO on January 29, 2021.

=== 2023–Present: Music Collaborations and acting career ===
In 2023, Rivera collaborated to Janine Berdin and Maris Racal where he played the leading man in the music video of "Bagay Nga Tayo Pero" and "Carelessly", respectively.

The following year, Rivera contributed to the High Street (Original Soundtrack), performing "Kalma Kahit Magulo - Reprise" alongside Maymay Entrata and fellow BGYO member Mikki Claver.

Rivera made his acting debut in the 2025 digital film adaptation of the Wattpad story The Four Bad Boys and Me, portraying Jeydon Lopez opposite Anji Salvacion. In 2026, he starred opposite Alexa Ilacad in the Filipino vertical microdrama series The Chambermaid's Daughter, portraying Daniel Jeon. Their on-screen pairing became known as GeLex. The pair later reprised their roles in the series' second season, establishing Rivera and Ilacad as an emerging on-screen partnership.

Also in 2026, Rivera released the collaboration single Zealous (Gã Săn Mồi) with Vietnamese singer Vũ Thảo My.

== Other ventures ==
=== Fashion ===
In 2022, Rivera and his fellow BGYO members modelled for the collaboration between H&M and Filipino streetwear label "Don't Blame the Kids (DBTK)". In 2023, he made his runway debut at .ARCHIVES' ARC 02: Digital Oasis fashion show.

Rivera has also appeared in fashion-related publications and events. In a 2022 interview with Teen Vogue, he described his approach to fashion as experimental and cited Korean drama actors, old Western films and NCT's Taeyong among his styles influences. In November 2023, he attended a Tommy Hilfiger event in Bangkok celebrating the brand's Fall 2023 collection and discussed his personal style with Esquire Philippines. In June 2024, Rivera and the other members of BGYO walked the runway for Filipino designer Bang Pineda's State of Bang fashion show. Later that year, he appeared with BGYO at Los Angeles Fashion Week, where the group performed. In December 2025, he was featured on the cover of VMAN Southeast Asia in a fashion editorial incorporating archival looks.

=== Journalism ===
In 2024, Gelo appeared as a guest entertainment anchor on ABS-CBN's flagship news program, TV Patrol.

== Artistry ==
Rivera have cited BTS, Exo, GOT7, Wanna One, Seventeen, NCT, Twice, WayV, Stray Kids, TXT, Treasure, and Big Bang as musical inspirations. In an interview with Myx Global, Rivera have also cited Jabbawockeez as an influence.

Rivera has co-written several songs released by BGYO: "The Light" (2021), "Runnin'" (2021) (Note: "The track was part of the 4th Season of Coke Studio Philippines' Itodo Mo Beat Mo.") and "The Baddest" (2021). He has said that, as a BGYO member, he hopes to inspire younger listeners through the group's music.

== Impact and influence ==
As the oldest member of BGYO, Rivera has been referred to as the group's "kuya", a Filipino term meaning older brother.

The 2×2 identification photograph of Rivera that attracted widespread attention on social media in February 2023.

In February 2023, a 2x2 identification photograph of Rivera attracted widespread attention on social media. The image, showing him against a white background in a black suit and tie, resurfaced on Twitter on February 26 after a user asked whether Rivera was the person pictured. By March 1, the post had received more than 1.8 million views. PEP.ph similarly reported that the photograph had gone viral, recording more than 1.6 million views earlier that day.

Rivera later explained that the viral 2x2 photograph had originally been taken for the group's United States visa application. He said that the members became aware of its popularity after they began receiving numerous tags on social media, and expressed appreciation that the photographs had also attracted attention from people outside BGYO's established fan base. As the photograph circulated, Star Music released identification photographs of the other BGYO members, while members of Bini also joined the online trend.

The photograph continued to receive media attention following its initial virality. In April 2023, NYLON Manila included Rivera among celebrities recognised for their identification photographs, describing his image as the "2×2 pic that shook social media".

== Personal life ==
Gelo has cited R&B and K-pop among his musical influences, and has named Taeyong of NCT and Jungkook of BTS as artists he admires. He has expressed interest in collaborating with choreographers and local artists, including Keone Madrid, Sienna Lalau, Parris Goebel. Aside from dancing, he has expressed interest in theatre, visual art, cooking, badminton and volleyball. He later joined the badminton team at the Star Magic All-Star Games.

== Discography ==
=== Collaborations ===
List of official collaboration singles showing year released and album name
Title	Year	Album	Ref.
"Gã Săn Mồi (Zealous) - Vietnamese Version" (with Vũ Thảo My)	2026	Zealous (Gã Săn Mồi) - Single	
"Zealous (Gã Săn Mồi) - English Version" (with Vũ Thảo My)	2026	Zealous (Gã Săn Mồi) - Single	

=== Soundtracks ===
List of official soundtrack singles showing year released and album name
Title	Year	Album	Ref.
"Kalma Kahit Magulo - Reprise" (with Mikki Claver & Maymay Entrata)"	2024	High Street (Original Soundtrack)	

=== Songwriting and Production credits ===
All song credits are adapted from the Tidal, unless otherwise noted.

Rivera's Songwriting and Production Credits
Year	Artist(s)	Song	Album	Lyricist		Composer		Ref.
Year	Artist(s)	Song	Album	Credited	With	Credited	With	Ref.
2021	BGYO	"The Light"	The Light - Single; The Light	Yes	Rogan; Ddank; Gelo Rivera; Akira Morishita; JL Toreliza; Mikki Claver; Nate Porcalla	No	Rogan; Ddank	
2021	BGYO; Keiko Necesario	"Runnin'"	Runnin' - Single	No	Keiko Necesario	Yes	Gelo Rivera; Akira Morishita; JL Toreliza; Mikki Claver; Nate Porcalla; Keiko Necesario	
2021	BGYO	"The Baddest"	The Baddest - Single; The Light	Yes	Angelo Troy Rivera (Gelo); Akira Morishita; Jonathan Manalo; TC Mack; Tha Aristocratz	Yes	Angelo Troy Rivera (Gelo); Akira Morishita; Jonathan Manalo; TC Mack; Tha Aristocratz	

== Filmography ==
=== Film ===
Year	Title	Role	Notes	Ref.
2025	The Four Bad Boys and Me	Jeydon Lopez		

=== Series ===
Year	Title	Role	Notes	Ref.
2021	ONE DREAM: The Bini - BGYO Journey	Himself	9 episodes telecast worldwide via MYX Global's Myx TV and on-demand via iWantTFC	
2026	The Chambermaid's Daughter	Daniel Jeon / Kpaps	30 episodes available on-demand via iWantTFC	
2026	The Chambermaid's Daughter - Part 2	Daniel Jeon / Kpaps	30 episodes available on-demand via iWantTFC	

=== Television ===
Year	Title	Role	Notes	Ref.
2020-present	ASAP	Himself	Performer	
2025	Your Face Sounds Familiar (season 4)	Performer as Kevin Richardson of the Backstreet Boys	Round 6 guest appearance during Akira Morishita's performance as Nick Carter	
2026	Born To Shine	Himself	Guest cast	

=== Music video appearances ===
Year	Title	Performer	Director	Ref.
2023	Bagay Nga Tayo Pero	Janine Berdin	Ken Tan	
2023	Carelessly	Maris Racal	Amiel Kirby Balagtas	

=== Webcast ===
Year	Title	Role	Network	Note(s)	Ref.
2020	SHA Trainees on Kumu Live	Himself	Kumu	3 episodes per week	
2021	ONE DREAM: Virtual Hangout	Himself	iWantTFC YouTube Channel	9 episodes	
2022	BGYO Gelo on Kumu Live	Himself	Kumu	3 episodes per week	
