= Akira Morishita =

Filipino actor and singer-songwriter (born 2001)

- 森下 晃
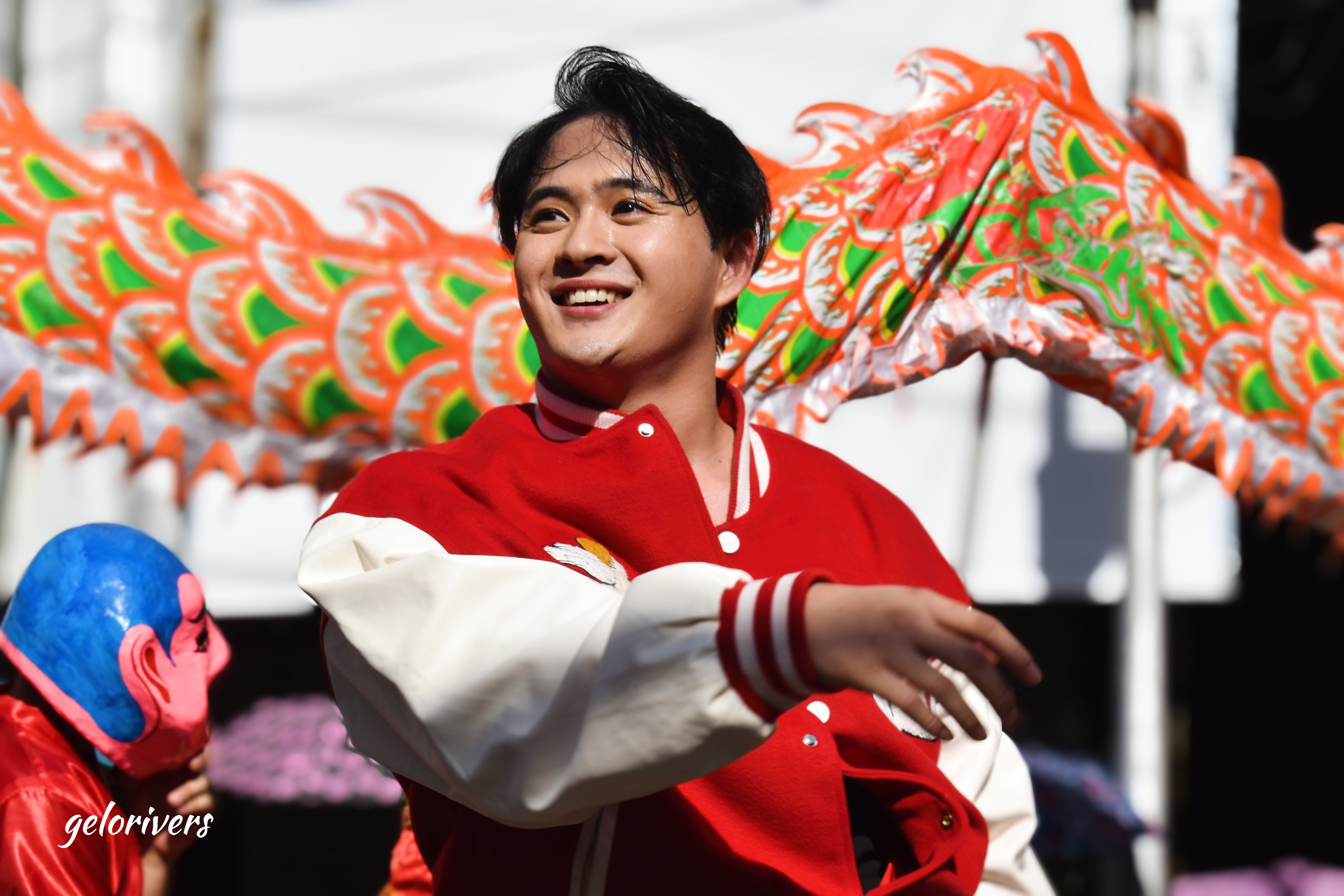
- Akira in January 2023
- Born: Akira Morishita; April 27, 2001 (age 25); Bulacan, Philippines
- Other name: Aki
- Education: Enderun Colleges
- Occupations: Actor; singer; songwriter; composer
- Years active: 2014–present
- Agents: Star Hunt (2018–2020); Star Magic (2020–present)
- Known for: All of Me; Member of BGYO
- Musical career
- Genre: P-pop
- Instrument: Vocals
- Labels: Star Music; Old School Records

Akira Morishita (森下 晃, Morishita Akira; born April 27, 2001), is a Filipino actor, singer, and songwriter known for being a member and lead vocalist of the Filipino boy group BGYO. Morishita has co-written several tracks released by BGYO: "The Light" (2021), "Runnin'" (2021), (Note: "The track was part of the 4th Season of Coke Studio Philippines' Itodo Mo Beat Mo.") "The Baddest" (2021), "Kundiman" (2021), "Fly Away" (2021) and an original soundtrack for a series Bola Bola titled "Mahal Na Kita" (2022), of which he released a solo version of the song.

Prior to his music career, Morishita started as an actor known for four movies: Sundalong Kanin (Rice Soldiers) (2014), Alienasyon (2014), Kalel, 15 (2019), 'Tol (2019); a television series All of Me (2015) and have appeared on several television commercials aired in the Philippines: Jollibee, Cherifer and Royal.

In March 2022, he became part of iWantTFC's original miniseries Bola Bola. In 2023, Morishita made a stage debut in Tabing Ilog: The Musical as "Rovic".

== Early life ==
Akira Morishita was born on April 27, 2001, to a Japanese father and a Filipino mother; both of them worked as musicians in Japan. At a young age, he aspired to become part of the military or the airforce but these were put aside when their family needed financial support by auditioning him for television and print ads. He grew up in Bulacan, Philippines and has visited Japan only once.

== Career ==
=== Television and film career ===
His career in the entertainment industry began in 2014 when he played the role of Carding in the indie film Sundalong Kanin, a Cinemalaya film entry by Janice O'Hara that served as his first film appearance. He also appeared in other independent films including Alienasyon, also in 2014 and Kalel, 15 in 2019. In 2015, he made his first television appearance in ABS-CBN's afternoon drama series All of Me, playing the role of Ringo Dimaculangan.

In 2022, while being a member of BGYO, he returned to acting through a main role in iWantTFC's teen romantic comedy series Bola Bola, starring Francine Diaz, KD Estrada, and Ashton Salvador. He plays Lucas Benitez, the long-time crush of Diaz's character Thea Balderama. He and his co-members from BGYO served as the performers of the show's theme song "Mahal Na Kita".

In 2025-2026, Morishita is one of the contestants of the fourth season of Your Face Sounds Familiar and ended up as the fourth placer.

=== Musical career ===
He joined the Star Hunt Academy (SHA) after he met and was recommended by Laurenti M. Dyogi, ABS-CBN's resident director and head of its entertainment division. Morishita was part of the original trainees of the Star Hunt Academy program, alongside Nate Porcalla, in 2018 and became part of "SHA Boys". He and his four co-members were trained for two years under Filipino and South Korean mentors from MU Doctor Academy; vocal coach Kitchy Molina; and dance coach Mickey Perz. They were officially announced in the pre-show of PBB Otso Big Night as Star Hunt trainees on August 3, 2019.

== Artistry ==
Morishita have cited Ed Sheeran and Shawn Mendes as musical inspirations.

== Personal life ==
He was raised in Bulacan with his three sisters and one brother. His hobbies are drawing and painting, and playing various sports including basketball where he was a varsity player in high school, and eventually, he became part of the Star Magic All-Star Games; tennis; and badminton. A fan of anime, he cites Demon Slayer: Kimetsu no Yaiba and its main character Tanjiro Kamado as his favorite anime and character, respectively.

== Discography ==
=== Collaborations ===
List of official collaboration singles showing year released and album name
Title	Year	Album	Ref.
"Be Mine" (with JL Toreliza)	2023	Be Mine - Single	

=== Soundtracks ===
List of official soundtrack singles showing year released and album name
Title	Year	Album	Ref.
"Mahal Na Kita"	2022	Bola Bola Original Soundtrack	

=== Production credits ===
All song credits are adapted from the Tidal, unless otherwise noted.

Morishita's Production Credits
Year	Artist(s)	Song	Album	Lyricist		Composer		Ref.
Year	Artist(s)	Song	Album	Credited	With	Credited	With	Ref.
2021	BGYO	"The Light"	The Light - Single; The Light	Yes	Rogan; Ddank; Gelo Rivera; Akira Morishita; JL Toreliza; Mikki Claver; Nate Porcalla	No	Rogan; Ddank	
2021	BGYO; Keiko Necesario	"Runnin'"	Runnin' - Single	No	Keiko Necesario	Yes	Gelo Rivera; Akira Morishita; JL Toreliza; Mikki Claver; Nate Porcalla; Keiko Necesario	
2021	BGYO	"The Baddest"	The Baddest - Single; The Light	Yes	Angelo Troy Rivera (Gelo); Akira Morishita; Jonathan Manalo; TC Mack; Tha Aristocratz	Yes	Angelo Troy Rivera (Gelo); Akira Morishita; Jonathan Manalo; TC Mack; Tha Aristocratz	
2021	BGYO	"Kundiman"	The Light	Yes	Akira Morishita; Jerwin Nicomedes	Yes	Akira Morishita; Jerwin Nicomedes	
2021	BGYO	"Fly Away"	The Light	Yes	Akira Morishita	Yes	Akira Morishita	
2022	BGYO	"Mahal Na Kita"	Bola Bola Original Soundtrack	Yes	Akira Morishita; Jonathan Manalo	Yes	Akira Morishita; Jonathan Manalo	
2022	Akira Morishita	"Mahal Na Kita"	Bola Bola Original Soundtrack	Yes	Akira Morishita; Jonathan Manalo	Yes	Akira Morishita; Jonathan Manalo	

== Filmography ==
=== Film ===
Year	Title	Role	Note(s)
2019	Kalel, 15	Balmaceda	
2019	'Tol	High School Dimitri	
2014	Sundalong Kanin	Carding	
2014	Alienasyon		

=== Television (linear and digital) ===
Year	Title	Network	Role	Reference(s)
2015	All of Me	ABS-CBN	Ringo Dimaculangan	
2020–present	ASAP	ABS-CBN; Kapamilya Channel; A2Z; ALLTV; TV5	Himself/Performer	
2022	Bola Bola	iWantTFC	Lucas Benitez	
2024–present	It's Showtime	Kapamilya Channel; A2Z; ALLTV; GMA Network; GTV	Himself/Performer	
2025–present	All-Out Sundays	GMA Network	Himself/Performer	
2025–present	Eat Bulaga!	TV5; RPTV	Himself/Performer	
2025–2026	Your Face Sounds Familiar season 4	Kapamilya Channel; A2Z; ALLTV; TV5	Himself/Contestant	
2026	Miss Behave	iWant	Warren	

=== Theater ===
Year	Title	Role	Note(s)	Ref.
2023	Tabing Ilog: The Musical 2023	Rolando Victor "Rovic" Mercado	Morishita played as "Rovic" in 12 out of 29 shows.	

=== Series ===
Year	Title	Role	Notes	Ref.
2021	ONE DREAM: The Bini - BGYO Journey	Himself	9 episodes telecast worldwide via MYX Global's Myx TV and on-demand via iWantTFC	

=== Webcast ===
Year	Title	Role	Note(s)	Ref.
2020	SHA Trainees on Kumu Live	Himself	3 episodes per week	
2021	ONE DREAM: Virtual Hangout	Himself	9 episodes	
2022	BGYO Akira on Kumu Live	Himself	3 episodes per week	

== Awards and nominations ==
Year	Award ceremony	Category	Nominated work	Result	Ref.
2015	Inding-Indie Gawad Parangal Asian Excellence Award 2015	Inding-Indie Gawad Parangal Most Promising Actor of Indie Films	Sundalong Kanin (for the role of Carding)	won	
