= While We Are Young (song) =

2017 single by Keiko Necesario

Single by Keiko Necesario featuring Quest

from the album Escape (2017), Ang Babaeng Allergic Sa Wifi (Official Motion Picture Soundtrack) (2018)
- Language: English
- Released: 30 June 2017
- Recorded: 2017
- Genre: pop, electro-folk
- Length: 3:51
- Label: Stages Sessions
- Songwriter: Keiko Necesario
- Producer: Nick Lazaro (la balls Studio)

Keiko Necesario singles chronology
"Highway" (2017)	"While We Are Young" (2017)	"Escape" (2017)

Quest singles chronology
"Win The Moment" (2017)	"While We Are Young" (2017)	"Unang Hakbang" (2017)

Official audio
- "While We Are Young" on YouTube

"While We Are Young" is a collaboration single of Filipino singer-songwriter Keiko Necesario and Filipino rapper Quest. The track was originally released on 30 June 2017 as part of Keiko Necesario's sophomore album Escape and has surpassed 800,000 streams on Spotify from the day of its release. It was re-released on 1 August 2018 by Stages Sessions, as part of the official motion picture soundtrack of the film Ang Babaeng Allergic Sa Wifi.

== Composition and lyrics ==
"While We Are Young" runs for a total of three minutes and fifty-one seconds. The song is set in common time with a tempo of 116 beats per minute and written in the key of D major. The lyrics were written in English by Keiko Necesario and the rap parts by Quest.

Wish 107.5 described "While We Are Young" as "an electro-folk pop track [that] is an ode to taking chances, rising above frustrations, and chasing after one’s biggest dreams".

== Reception ==
Wish 107.5 expressed that "While We Are Young [as] glowing with perkiness and vigor [that] should definitely sit on the top your summer playlist".

== Promotion ==
=== Live performances ===
On 29 July 2018, Keiko performed "While We Are Young" on Penshoppe Fancon Crowd.

=== Radio ===
On 18 August 2017, Keiko and Quest performed the song on Wish 107.5 Bus.

== Credits and personnel ==
Credits adapted from YouTube:

- Lyrics by: Keiko Necesario
- RAP by: Quest
- Photo by: Michael Gonzales of Mayad.
- Song produced by: Nick Lazaro (la balls Studio)
- LOGO by: Sid Bunye

== BGYO version ==
"While We Are Young"

Single by BGYO
- Language: English
- Released: 18 June 2021
- Recorded: 2021
- Genre: Soul; Funk; R&B; Boogie; Post-disco; Big band
- Length: 4:00
- Label: Star Music (ABS-CBN)
- Songwriter: Keiko Necesario

BGYO singles chronology
"Runnin'" (2021)	"While We Are Young" (2021)	"The Baddest" (2021)

Lyric video
- "While We Are Young" on YouTube

"While We Are Young" is the first revival single by the Filipino boy group BGYO. The official track was released on 18 June 2021 as a Digital Single by Star Music. It was produced as part of the 4th Season of Coke Studio Philippines' Itodo Mo Beat Mo.

=== Composition ===
BGYO's version of "While We Are Young" runs for a total of four minutes. The song is set in common time with a tempo of 120 beats per minute and written in the key of F♯/G♭ minor.

=== Background and release ===
BGYO's version of "While We Are Young" was first revealed in the first episode of Coke Studio Philippines' Itodo Mo Beat Mo on 17 May 2021. On 18 June 2021, the track was officially released as a single via digital download accompanied by a lyric video uploaded by Star Music on YouTube.

=== Reception ===
Arambulo Live shared "BGYO made sure to put their own spin on the cover by speeding up the track a bit and including awesome dance moves!"

== In popular culture ==
- On 26 July 2018, Filipina actress Sue Ramirez covers the song on Wish 107.5 Bus. She also performed the song on the virtual launch of Kawaii Whitening Soap, on 10 June 2021.

== See also ==
- BGYO discography
- List of BGYO live performances
