= BGYO discography =

- Studio albums: 2
- EPs: 3
- Single packs: 1
- Singles (as lead artist): 46
- Promotional singles: 3
- Collaborations: 5
- Remixes: 2

Filipino boy band BGYO (formerly Star Hunt Academy Boys or SHA Boys) has released two studio albums, three EPs, one single pack, forty-six singles (as lead artist), three promotional singles, five collaborations, and two remix singles.

The group debuted in the Philippines on January 29, 2021, with the single "The Light". That same year, they released the original soundtrack "He's Into Her" for the series He's Into Her. Following its release, BGYO became the fifth Filipino act to appear on Billboard's weekly Next Big Sound chart, debuting at number two. The group also took part in the network's summer station ID "Feel Good Pilipinas". They later released two promotional singles, "Runnin'" and "While We Are Young", as part of Coke Studio Philippines' Itodo Mo Beat Mo. In August 2021, BGYO released "The Baddest"; following its release, the group subsequently reached number one on the weekly Next Big Sound chart, becoming the first Filipino act to top the chart. "Kulay" was released on September 23, 2021, as the theme song of the Miss Universe Philippines 2021 National Costume Competition. In October 2021, the group released their debut studio album, The Light, which includes "The Light", "The Baddest", "He's Into Her", five new songs—"When I'm with You", "Kundiman", "Sabay", "Fly Away" and "Rocketman"—and Bahasa Indonesia, Japanese, Spanish and Thai versions of "The Light". In November 2021, the group also participated in the ABS-CBN Christmas station ID theme song "Andito Tayo Para sa Isa't Isa".

In the first quarter of 2022, BGYO released the original soundtrack recordings "Mahal Na Kita", "Up!" and "Best Time". In June 2022, three of their songs—"Kundiman", "He's Into Her" and "The Baddest"—were selected for The Lunar Codex's Polaris Collection time capsule. The group subsequently released "Tumitigil Ang Mundo". In August, they released "Patuloy Lang Ang Lipad", the theme song for the television series Darna. To support their second studio album, Be Us, the group released "Magnet" and "PNGNP". The album was released on November 3, 2022. Later that month, "Tumitigil Ang Mundo" was included on the An Inconvenient Love original soundtrack.

In 2023, BGYO released the standalone single "Bulalakaw". Their releases in 2024 included "Patintero", "Uuwian (Reprise)", "Gigil" and "Trash". "Trash" was also issued as the group's first single pack, which included sped-up and slowed-down and reverb versions of the track.

In 2025, the group released two EPs. Their self-titled EP, BGYO, was released on March 13 and included "Trash", "Andito Lang", "Divine", "Light My Fire" and "Heartstrings". Their second EP of the year, Headlines, followed on September 25 and included "All These Ladies", "Headlines", "Dance With Me" and "Aloe Vera".

In 2026, BGYO released "Fresh" ahead of their third EP, On Demand, which was released on June 4.

== Studio albums ==
List of studio albums
Title	Album details	Ref.
The Light	Released: October 7, 2021; Label: Star Music; Formats: digital download, streaming	
Be Us	Released: November 3, 2022; Label: Star Music; Formats: digital download, streaming	

== Extended plays ==
List of extended plays, with sales figures, and certifications
Title	EP details	Ref.
BGYO	Released: March 13, 2025; Label: Star Music; Formats: CD, digital download, streaming	
Headlines	Released: September 25, 2025; Label: Star Music; Formats: digital download, streaming	
On Demand	Released: June 4, 2026; Label: Star Music; Formats: digital download, streaming	

== Single packs ==
List of single packs
Title	Single pack details	Ref.
Trash	Released: September 13, 2024; Label: Star Music; Formats: digital download, streaming	

== Singles ==
=== As lead artist ===
List of singles showing year released and album name
Title	Year	Album	Ref.
"The Light"	2021	The Light	
"He's Into Her" (Note: "Before it was included on BGYO's debut album The Light, it was first released as an original soundtrack of the series He's Into Her (Season 1)".)	2021	The Light	
"The Baddest"	2021	The Light	
"When I'm with You"	2021	The Light	
"Kundiman"	2021	The Light	
"Sabay"	2021	The Light	
"Fly Away"	2021	The Light	
"Rocketman"	2021	The Light	
"The Light - Bahasa Indonesia Version"	2021	The Light	
"The Light - Japanese Version"	2021	The Light	
"The Light - Spanish Version"	2021	The Light	
"The Light - Thai Version"	2021	The Light	
"Kulay (Miss Universe Philippines 2021)" (Note: "The track was released as an official theme song of Miss Universe Philippines 2021 (Official National Costume Song)".)	2021	Kulay (Miss Universe Philippines 2021) - Single	
"Mahal Na Kita"	2022	Bola Bola Original Soundtrack	
"Best Time" (Note: "The track was released as the original soundtrack of He's Into Her (Season 2).")	2022	Best Time - Single	
"Patuloy Lang Ang Lipad" (Note: "It was announced in July 28, 2022 that BGYO will sing the soundtrack of Mars Ravelo's Darna TV series.")	2022	Patuloy Lang Ang Lipad (Theme of "Darna") - Single	
"Game On"	2022	Be Us	
"Magnet"	2022	Be Us	
"Be Us"	2022	Be Us	
"Tumitigil Ang Mundo"	2022	Be Us	
"Panahon"	2022	Be Us	
"PNGNP"	2022	Be Us	
"Laro"	2022	Be Us	
"Extraordinary"	2022	Be Us	
"Bulalakaw"	2023	Bulalakaw - Single	
"Patintero"	2024	Patintero - Single	
"Uuwian (Reprise)"	2024	What's Wrong with Secretary Kim? Original Soundtrack	
"Gigil"	2024	Non-album single	
"Trash (Sped Up)"	2024	Trash	
"Trash (Slowed Down + Reverb)"	2024	Trash	
"Trash"	2024	BGYO	
"Andito Lang"	2024	BGYO	
"Divine"	2025	BGYO	
"Light My Fire"	2025	BGYO	
"Heartstrings"	2025	BGYO	
"All These Ladies"	2025	Headlines	
"Headlines"	2025	Headlines	
"Dance With Me"	2025	Headlines	
"Aloe Vera"	2025	Headlines	
"Fresh"	2026	On Demand	
"Forever Tonight"	2026	On Demand	
"Life's Too Short"	2026	On Demand	
"Mean Girl"	2026	On Demand	
"Raindrop"	2026	On Demand	
"Trono"	2026	On Demand	
"Sinta"	2026	On Demand	
"Candlelit"	2026		
"Candlelit (English Version)"	2026		

=== Promotional singles ===
List of promotional singles showing year released and album name
Title	Year	Album	Ref.
"Runnin'" (with Keiko Necesario)	2021	Coke Studio PH Season 5	
"While We Are Young" (with Keiko Necesario and Quest)	2021	Coke Studio PH Season 5	
"Live Vivid"	2023	Live Vivid Single (Note: "The track was released as a theme song of Xiaomi's "Live Vivid Campaign".)	

=== Collaborations ===
List of collaboration singles showing year released and album name
Title	Year	Album	Ref.
"Feel Good Pilipinas" (with KZ Tandingan) (Note: "The track was released as a theme song of ABS CBN Special Summer ID 2021".)	2021	Feel Good Pilipinas - Single	
"Andito Tayo Para sa Isa't Isa" with Kapamilya artists Sharon Cuneta, Piolo Pascual, Ogie Alcasid, Regine Velasquez, Kathryn Bernardo, Daniel Padilla, Gary Valenciano, Martin Nievera, Zsa Zsa Padilla, Sarah Geronimo, Vice Ganda, Erik Santos, KZ Tandingan, Darren Espanto, Iñigo Pascual, Donny Pangilinan, Belle Mariano, Seth Fedelin, Andrea Brillantes) (Note: "The track was released as a theme song of ABS CBN's Christmas ID 2021".)	2021	Andito Tayo Para sa Isa't Isa - Single	
"Up!" (with BINI) (Note: "The song was released as an original soundtrack of BINI & BGYO Dubai Adventures: A Docufilm".)	2022	Up! - Single	
"Kabataang Pinoy" (with Cloud 7)	2025	Pinoy Big Brother Celebrity Collab Edition 2.0 Original Soundtrack	
"Love, Joy, Hope (with various artists)	2025		

=== Remixes ===
List of remix singles showing year released and album name
Title	Year	Album	Ref.
"Feel Good Pilipinas (Extended Remix)" (with KZ Tandingan, remixed by DJ DLS)	2021	Feel Good Pilipinas (Extended Remix) - Single	
"He's Into Her (Remix)"	2022	He's Into Her Season 2 Original Soundtrack	

== See also ==
- Star Music discography
- 2021 in Philippine music
- 2022 in Philippine music
