= Kulay (song) =

2021 single by BGYO

"Kulay (Miss Universe Philippines 2021)"

Single by BGYO
- Language: Filipino
- Released: 1 October 2021
- Recorded: 2021
- Genre: Pinoy pop
- Length: 4:10
- Label: Star Music (ABS-CBN) on behalf of "Old School Records"
- Songwriters: Kiko KIKX Salazar; Nhiko Sabiniano
- Producer: Jonas Gaffud

BGYO singles chronology
"The Baddest" (2021)	"Kulay (Miss Universe Philippines 2021)" (2021)	"When I'm with You" (2021)

Music video
- "Kulay" on YouTube

"Kulay" (transl. Color) is a song recorded by the Filipino boy band BGYO. It was released on 1 October 2021 as a digital single by Star Music on behalf of "Old School Records". The song was written and composed by Kiko KIKX Salazar and Nhiko Sabiniano for the official soundtrack of the Miss Universe Philippines 2021 National Costume Competition.

The track became an instant favorite upon the release of the music video.

== Composition and lyrics ==
"Kulay" runs for a total of four minutes and ten seconds, set in common time with a tempo of 125 beats per minute and written in the key of D♯/E♭ major. The track becomes the first full-length BGYO song written in Filipino, that speaks about being consumed by attraction to someone.

"Kulay",[a song about] paying homage to the people who made a change in the lives of its group and its listeners.

— Lion's Den, Lionheartv

== Background and release ==
On 22 September 2021, the Miss Universe Philippines organization announced in their social media platforms, the participation of BGYO in the preliminaries of the pageant. "Kulay" was first heard through the music video released on 23 September 2021 by Empire Philippines and was officially released as a single on 1 October 2021 along with the lyric video released by Star Music.

== Promotion ==
=== Television ===
On 1 October 2021, the group performed the acapella version of the song live on It's Showtime as part of their guesting in the TV show's segment "Madlang Pi-Poll".

=== Virtual ===
On 1 October 2021, BGYO appeared in an interview with Myx Global as part of the "BGYO Fan Q&A" and "Kulay" promotion. On 21 October 2021, the group performed the song on It's Showtime's subsidiary online show, "It's Showtime - All Access" hosted by Jackie Gonzaga.

== Music video ==
The music video for "Kulay" features the 28 candidates of Miss Universe Philippines 2021 on their National Costume—a variety of Maria Clara gown with a glimpse of BGYO's recording session.

== Credits and personnel ==
Credits adapted from the description of BGYO's "Kulay" lyric video, unless otherwise stated.

- Performed by BGYO
- Music/Lyrics: Kiko KIKX Salazar/Nhiko Sabiniano
- Arrangement: Nhiko Sabiniano
- Mix/Master: KIKX
- Music Production: KIKX
- Executive Producer: Jonas Gaffud

== See also ==
- BGYO discography
- List of BGYO live performances
