= Nate Porcalla =

Filipino-American singer-songwriter (born 2003)

Nate
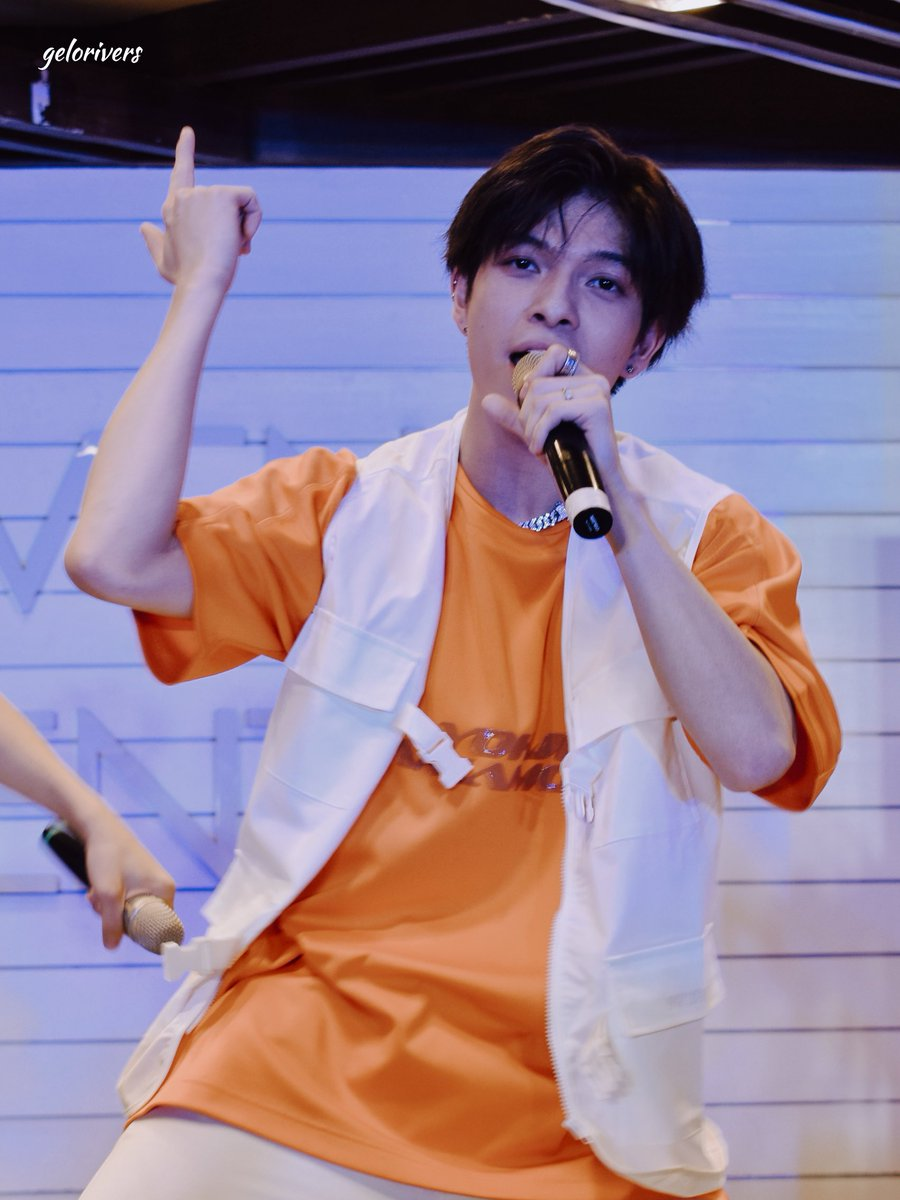
- Nate in January 2023
- Born: Nathaniel Porcalla; 26 June 2003 (age 23); Chicago, Illinois, U.S.
- Other name: Nate
- Occupations: rapper; singer; dancer; songwriter
- Years active: 2015–present
- Agents: Star Hunt (2018–2020); Star Magic (2020–present)
- Known for: Dance Kids Philippines; World of Dance Philippines; Member of BGYO
- Musical career
- Genre: P-pop
- Instrument: Vocals
- Labels: Star Music; Old School Records

Nathaniel Porcalla (born June 26, 2003), known professionally as Nate Porcalla or simply Nate, is a Filipino-American singer, rapper, dancer and songwriter. He is a member of the Filipino boy group BGYO. Before the group's debut, he competed in the Philippine dance programs Dance Kids in 2015 and World of Dance Philippines in 2019. In 2016, he was selected through an audition to perform during the Rosemont, Illinois, stop of Justin Bieber's Purpose World Tour.

Porcalla has received songwriting credits on several BGYO releases, including "The Light", "Runnin'" (Note: "The track was part of the 4th Season of Coke Studio Philippines' Itodo Mo Beat Mo.") and "Rocketman".

== Early life ==
Porcalla was born in Chicago, Illinois, and spent most of his childhood in the United States. He began dancing at the age of six and trained at Xtreme Dance Center in Naperville, Illinois. By 2022, he had completed high school.

== Career ==
=== 2015–2017: Dance competitions and early performances ===
In 2015, Porcalla travelled between the United States and Manila to compete in Dance Kids.

On April 22, 2016, while a seventh-grade student at Cowherd Middle School in Aurora, Illinois, he was one of the young dancers selected through an audition to perform during Bieber's concert at Allstate Arena. In October of the same year, he was one of four dance-audition winners who performed to Z and Fetty Wap's "Nobody's Better" during Darren Espanto's digital concert The Other Side of Darren.

=== 2018–present: Star Hunt Academy, World of Dance Philippines and BGYO ===
Porcalla joined the Star Hunt Academy (SHA) training program in 2018 and became part of its male trainee group, later known as SHA Boys. In 2019, while still a trainee, he competed in the first season of World of Dance Philippines.

The trainees underwent two years of vocal and dance training under Filipino and South Korean mentors, including MU Doctor Academy, vocal coach Kitchy Molina and dance coach Mickey Perz. Porcalla said that he developed his rapping skills while in the training camp. The trainees were publicly introduced during the pre-show of the Pinoy Big Brother: Otso Big Night on August 3, 2019. Porcalla debuted as a member of BGYO on January 29, 2021.

== Artistry ==
Porcalla has cited BTS, EXO, GOT7, Wanna One, Seventeen, NCT, WayV, Stray Kids, TXT, Treasure and BigBang as musical influences.

In interviews with MYX Global, he also named the Jabbawockeez as an influence on his dancing and interest in music.

== Public image and interests ==
NYLON Manila described Porcalla as one of BGYO's more experienced dancers and referred to him as the group's "dance machine". He has said that his mother influenced his interest in music and his decision to pursue a career as an idol. His fashion interests include Rick Owens, Playboi Carti, Air Jordan shoes and thrift-store clothing.

== Discography ==
=== Songwriting and production credits ===
All song credits are adapted from the Tidal, unless otherwise noted.

Porcalla's Songwriting and Production Credits
Year	Artist(s)	Song	Album	Lyricist		Composer		Ref.
Year	Artist(s)	Song	Album	Credited	With	Credited	With	Ref.
2021	BGYO	"The Light"	The Light - Single; The Light	Yes	Rogan; Ddank; Gelo Rivera; Akira Morishita; JL Toreliza; Mikki Claver; Nate Porcalla	No	Rogan; Ddank	
2021	BGYO; Keiko Necesario	"Runnin'"	Runnin' - Single	No	Keiko Necesario	Yes	Gelo Rivera; Akira Morishita; JL Toreliza; Mikki Claver; Nate Porcalla; Keiko Necesario	
2021	BGYO	"Rocketman"	The Light	Yes	Athena Antiporda; Jonathan Manalo; Lian Kyla; Nathaniel Porcalla (Nate)	No	Athena Antiporda; Jonathan Manalo; Lian Kyla	

== Concerts ==
=== Special performances ===
Year	Title	Details	Notes	Ref.
2016	Purpose World Tour	Date: April 22; Venue: Allstate Arena, Rosemont, United States of America	Selected dancer for the concert's "Children" segment	
2016	One Music Digital Concert Series Presents: The Other Side of DARREN	Date: October 30, Sunday; Venue: ABS-CBN Compound, Quezon City, Philippines; Produced by: One Music PH	Dance-audition winner and performer	

== Filmography ==
=== Documentary Series ===
Year	Title	Role	Notes	Ref.
2021	ONE DREAM: The Bini - BGYO Journey	Himself	9 episodes telecast worldwide via MYX Global's Myx TV and on-demand via iWantTFC	

=== Television ===
Year	Title	Role	Note(s)	Ref.
2015	Dance Kids	Himself	Contestant	
2019	World of Dance Philippines	Himself	Junior Division contestant, season 1	
2020–present	ASAP	Himself	Regular performer as part of the Star Hunt Academy Boys, later appearing with BGYO and in ensemble production numbers	
2020	It's Showtime	Himself	Performed with the Star Hunt Academy Boys	
2021	It's Showtime	Himself	Performed with BGYO	
2025	Your Face Sounds Familiar	Himself	Guest appearance during Akira Morishita's performance as Nick Carter; Porcalla appeared as Brian Littrell	
2026	Born To Shine	Himself	Guest cast	

=== Webcast ===
Year	Title	Role	Note(s)	Ref.
2020	SHA Trainees on Kumu Live	Himself	Kumu	3 episodes per week
2021	ONE DREAM: Virtual Hangout	Himself	iWantTFC YouTube Channel	9 episodes
2022	BGYO Nate on Kumu Live	Himself	Kumu	3 episodes per week
