= Forever Tonight =

Forever Tonight may refer to:

- “Tonight is Forever” By Pet Shop Boys
- "Forever Tonight" by BGYO, from the 2026 EP On Demand
- "Forever Tonight" by Galantis, from the album Pharmacy
- "Forever Tonight" by Jan Hammer
- "Forever Tonight" by Pantera, from the album I Am the Night
- "(I Wanna Take) Forever Tonight" by Peter Cetera, from the album One Clear Voice
