= Patintero (song) =

2024 single by BGYO

Single by BGYO
- Language: Filipino; English
- Released: February 9, 2024
- Genre: Pop
- Label: Star Music
- Songwriters: Julius James "Jumbo" De Belen; John Michael Conchada
- Producer: Bojam

BGYO singles chronology
"Bulalakaw" (2023)	"Patintero" (2024)	"Uuwian (Reprise)" (2024)

Music video
- "Patintero" on YouTube

"Patintero" is a song by Filipino boy band BGYO, released on February 9, 2024 through Star Music. Written by Julius James "Jumbo" De Belen and John Michael Conchada and produced by Bojam of FlipMusic, the pop song takes its title and central metaphor from patintero, a traditional Filipino street game.

The song received international recognition when it won Song by New International Artist at the BreakTudo Awards in Brazil. Its music video was nominated for Pop Video of the Year at the 2024 MYX Music Awards, while the song also received a nomination for Choreography in a Live Performance at the 2024 PPOP Music Awards.

Commercially, "Patintero" reached the top 20 of Spotify Philippines' Viral Chart in 2024. In Spotify's year-end data for the Philippines, it was also identified as the top song of 2024 on the platform's P-Pop On The Rise playlist.

== Background and release ==
BGYO introduced "Patintero" in late January 2024 as the first single from a planned third studio album. The group described the then-upcoming project as more hands-on, with the members contributing more directly to its lyrics and musical ideas. The cover art was revealed on a billboard on January 26, 2024. "Patintero" was released to digital and streaming platforms on February 9, 2024.

== Composition and lyrics ==
"Patintero" is a pop song written by Julius James "Jumbo" De Belen and John Michael Conchada and produced by Bojam of FlipMusic. The Freeman described the track as "old-school-inspired".

"Patintero"
A 20.5-second sample illustrating the song's old-school-inspired pop sound

The song uses the traditional Filipino street game patintero as a metaphor for navigating obstacles, competition and choices in life. The song presents winning and losing as secondary to enjoying the process, maintaining a positive outlook and avoiding harm to others.

The lyrics are primarily in Filipino with some English phrases.

== Music video ==
The music video for "Patintero" was released through BGYO's official YouTube channel on February 9, 2024. It was directed by Karlo Calingao and produced by Chapters PH. The video's choreography was credited to Lean Mangrobang, Reden Blanquera, Adam Alonzo and Mickey Perz.

Calingao's direction later received a nomination for Pop Video of the Year at the 2024 MYX Music Awards.

== Live performances ==
BGYO performed "Patintero" on the Wish 107.5 Bus; the performance was published on April 10, 2024.

The group also performed the song during Chowking's Halo-Halo Land event at SM Seaside Cebu in March 2024, alongside "Sabay".

== Critical reception ==
Hans Carbonilla of Inquirer.net described it as an "upbeat and refreshing track", describing it as a "comeback single".

== Commercial performance ==
"Patintero" reached the top 20 of Spotify Philippines' Viral Chart in March 2024. By April 2024, "Patintero" had surpassed 1.2 million streams on Spotify. By June, The Freeman reported that the song had reached 1.8 million Spotify streams.

In Spotify's 2024 year-end data for the Philippines, "Patintero" was identified as the top song in the platform's P-Pop On The Rise playlist for the year.

== Accolades ==
Year	Organization	Award	Result	Ref.
2024	BreakTudo Awards	Song by New International Artist	Won	
2024	MYX Music Awards	Pop Video of the Year	Nominated	
2024	PPOP Music Awards	Choreography in a Live Performance	Nominated	

== Credits and personnel ==
Credits are adapted from Shazam and the official music video.

- BGYO – vocals
- Julius James "Jumbo" De Belen – songwriter, arranger, vocal arranger
- John Michael Conchada – songwriter, vocal arranger
- Bojam – producer
- Rap Sanchez – mixing, mastering, recording
- Jeremy Glinoga – recording
- Jerwin Nicomedez – vocal coach
- Lean Mangrobang – choreography
- Reden Blanquera – choreography
- Adam Alonzo – choreography
- Mickey Perz – choreography

== Release history ==
Release dates and formats for "Patintero"
Country	Date	Format	Label
Various	February 9, 2024	Digital download; streaming	Star Music

== See also ==
- BGYO discography
- List of BGYO live performances
