= Magnet (BGYO song) =

2022 single by BGYO

Single by BGYO

from the album Be Us
- Language: English; Filipino
- Released: October 20, 2022
- Recorded: 2022
- Studio: The Purple Room, Quezon City
- Genre: Pop, dance-pop, techno
- Length: 3:35
- Label: Star Music
- Songwriters: John Michael Conchada of Flipmusic; Julius James "Jumbo" De Belen of Flipmusic
- Producer: Bojam of Flipmusic

BGYO singles chronology
"Patuloy Lang Ang Lipad" (2022)	"Magnet" (2022)	"PNGNP" (2022)

Music video
- "Magnet" on YouTube

"Magnet" is a song recorded by Filipino boy band BGYO, released on 20 October 2022 as the lead single of their second album BE:US. It was written and composed by John Michael Conchada and Julius James "Jumbo" De Belen of FlipMusic Productions, who has also worked with the group's Tumitigil Ang Mundo. The track charted on iTunes Singles Chart in United Arab Emirates and Hong Kong; and peaked at number 1 in 3 countries—Philippines, Singapore and Saudi Arabia.

== Composition and lyrics ==
"Magnet" runs for a total of three minutes and thirty-five seconds, set in common time with a tempo of 96 beats per minute and written in the key of C♯/D♭ major, produced by Bojam of Flipmusic. Most of its lyrics were written in Filipino, except with Nate's rap parts and the phrase "your love is my magnet", as it was written in English that speaks about someone's love story taking reference to a magnet—that no matter how many obstacles for the love on that person would be, love will always be the gravitating force to get back to that person—and was being compared to Bonnie & Clyde. As reported by ppopwave.com, Conchada explained that the idea behind "Magnet", started upon seeing his mother's magnet collection on the fridge, and eventually relates it to a song of emotion—to attract. On a separate article posted by vman.com, BGYO shared that "[Magnet] talks about fate...a magnetic connection that's hard to resist or control, if you are meant to be together, love will always find its way back, just like a magnet".

== Background and release ==
"Magnet" was first unveiled on 10 October 2022 with a snippet on the instrumental of the track, and was announced as the lead single of BGYO's sophomore album "BE:US". On 19 October 2022, the music video teaser was revealed alongside its lyric sheet and was officially released on 20 October 2022. A separate performance video was released on 26 October 2022.

== Reception ==
According to Nicholson Baird of VMan, "Magnet is a punchy pop song, showing off suave vocals which are backed by strong synths" and describing it as a "modernized dancefloor bangers of 90's boy bands". Rafael Bautista of Nylon Manila praised "Magnet" in an article saying "the P-pop boy group's sensual swag mixed with the funky production all help make "Magnet" a bop from start to finish" and emphasized the parts of Gelo and Mikki as "the highlight of the track". JE CC of lionheartv expressed in an article saying "Magnet bursts with visual flair, which never been in their previous works" and categorized it as a "certified P-POP banger".

== Promotion ==
=== Live performances ===
The group's first live performance of "Magnet" came true on the first ever K-pop Halloween Concert in the Philippines—Hallyuween 2022. The group showcased it from the Orleans Arena during the ASAP Natin 'To Las Vegas in matching black and silver outfits. BGYO performed "Magnet" at the Wish USA Bus on 11 November 2022, as part of the group's US Press Tour.

== Music video ==
The music video of "Magnet" flare-up into vivid and dimly-toned colors produced by Chapters PH, directed by Karlo Calingao. The opening sequences presented in a fast phase, flashing snippets of each BGYO members solo routines. As the song video goes on, cryptic imagery were shown which features the members—Nate, Gelo, JL, Akira and Mikki—in an enclosed space interspersed with sleek and sophisticated dance choreography (by Brian Puspos) showcased in between verses and pre-chorus.

== Credits and personnel ==
All song credits are adapted from the official music video of "Magnet" via BGYO's YouTube channel, unless otherwise noted.

- Composed by John Michael Conchada and Julius James "Jumbo" De Belen of FlipMusic
- Arranged by Jumbo De Belen of FlipMusic
- Vocal Arrangement by John Michael Conchada and Jumbo De Belen of FlipMusic
- Vocal Coaching by Jerwin Nicomedez
- Guitars by Jumbo De Belen of FlipMusic
- Additional Production by Mat Olavides of FlipMusic
- Mixed & Mastered by Mat Olavides and Jumbo De Belen of FlipMusic
- Produced by Bojam of FlipMusic
- Supervising Producer: Jonathan Manalo

== Release history ==
Country	Date	Format	Version	Label
Various	20 October 2022	Airplay, Digital download, streaming, video streaming	Single	Star Music
Various	3 November 2022	Airplay, Digital download, streaming, video streaming	BE:US Album	Star Music

== See also ==
- BGYO discography
- List of BGYO live performances
