= Patuloy Lang ang Lipad =

2022 Single by BGYO

"Patuloy Lang Ang Lipad"

Single by BGYO
- Language: Filipino
- Released: August 14, 2022
- Recorded: 2022
- Studio: The Purple Room, Quezon City
- Genre: Pop rock, P-Pop
- Length: 3:37
- Label: Star Music
- Songwriters: Angela Ken; Sabine Cerrado; Lian Kyla; Trisha Denise; Jonathan Manalo
- Composer: Jonathan Manalo
- Producer: Jonathan Manalo

BGYO singles chronology
| "Tumitigil Ang Mundo" (2022) | "Patuloy Lang Ang Lipad" (2022) | "Magnet" (2022) |

Lyric video
- "Patuloy Lang Ang Lipad" on YouTube

"Patuloy Lang Ang Lipad" (transl. Just Keep Flying) is a song recorded by Filipino boy band BGYO released on 14 August 2022, written by singer-songwriters Angela Ken, Sabine Cerrado (known mononymously as SAB), Lian Kyla, Trisha Denise together with the composer-producer Jonathan Manalo. The track was produced as the original soundtrack of the 2022 television adaptation of Mars Ravelo's Filipino superheroine Darna and peaks at number 1 on iTunes Singles Chart in 4 countries—Philippines, Singapore, United Arab Emirates and Saudi Arabia.

== Use in Darna (2022 TV series) ==
In the series Darna (2022 TV series), "Patuloy Lang Ang Lipad" was first heard on its pilot episode, where "Narda" came to help "Brian Robles". It was also used as the promotional track and the opening theme of the series, that sets the mood for the coming episode.

== Composition and lyrics ==
"Patuloy Lang Ang Lipad" is an upbeat track that runs for a total of three minutes and thirty-seven seconds. The song is set in common time with a tempo of 170 beats per minute and written in the key of A♯/B♭ major. The lyrics were written in Tagalog by several singer-songwriters of Star Music, who has worked also with the group's collaboration single with BINI Up!, that tackles about the confidence and heroism of the series' protagonist "Darna".

== Background and release ==
"Patuloy Lang Ang Lipad" is the fourth original song of BGYO released in 2022 that is a part of the original soundtrack. On 28 July 2022, BGYO were announced to sing the original soundtrack of Darna (2022 TV series). The snippet and the title of the track was first heard and revealed on 8 August 2022 at the "Darna Grand Media Conference". The official track was released on 14 August 2022, accompanied by the lyric video on YouTube.

== Reception ==
Renzneil Robles of the "Village Pipol" shared in an article "BGYO gives Darna 2022 a modern tune,...will surely be emblematic like the ones it succeeded".

== Promotion ==
=== Television ===
On 14 August 2022, BGYO performed the first television live performance of "Patuloy Lang Ang Lipad" on ASAP Natin 'To stage with the appearances from the casts of the TV series and a solo performance of the track on 4 September 2022.

== Release history ==
| Country | Date | Format | Version | Label |
|---|---|---|---|---|
| Various | August 14, 2022 | Airplay, Digital download, streaming, video streaming | Single | Star Music |

== See also ==
- BGYO discography
- List of BGYO live performances
