= Mahal Na Kita =

2022 Single by BGYO

Single by BGYO

from the EP Bola Bola Original Soundtrack
- Language: Filipino
- Released: March 25, 2022
- Recorded: 2022
- Studio: The Purple Room, Quezon City
- Genre: Pop
- Length: 3:26
- Label: Star Music
- Songwriters: Akira Morishita; Jonathan Manalo
- Producer: Manalo

BGYO singles chronology
| "Kundiman" (2021) | "Mahal Na Kita" (2022) | "Up!" (2022) |

Akira Morishita singles chronology
| "Mahal Na Kita" (2022) |

Music video
- "Mahal Na Kita" on YouTube

"Mahal Na Kita" (transl. I'm in Love with You) is a song recorded by Filipino boy band BGYO released on March 25, 2022, as the official soundtrack of iWantTFC's digital Philippine teen romantic comedy miniseries Bola Bola. The song was written and composed by BGYO member Akira Morishita and Jonathan Manalo. The song became part of Spotify's "Tatak Pinoy" playlist.

== Composition and lyrics ==
"Mahal Na Kita" is a love ballad that runs for a total of three minutes and twenty-six seconds. The song is set in common time with a tempo of 92 beats per minute and written in the key of A♯/B♭ major. The lyrics were written in Filipino about falling in love with someone that we consider beautiful inside and out.

== Background and release ==
The audio teaser of "Mahal Na Kita" was first heard on 21 March 2022 released by Star Music on different social media platforms. On 25 March 2022 the track was released, accompanied by the lyric video uploaded on YouTube.

== Reception ==
Rafael Baustista of Nylon Manila shared in an article "BGYO in a whole new sound. The boys sound so good on the song and the vibe really suits them well". Astig.PH mentioned in an article "the boys of BGYO, are proving that the "Pinoy harana" is alive and well, with a modern spin, in "Mahal Na Kita".

== Promotion ==
=== Television ===
On 31 July 2022, "Mahal Na Kita" officially debuts on television through the Philippines musical variety show ASAP Natin 'To stage.

== Other versions ==
"Mahal Na Kita" marks the debut single of Akira Morishita as he also released a solo version of the track that is also included in the Bola Bola Original Soundtrack.

== Release history ==
| Country | Date | Format | Label |
|---|---|---|---|
| Various | March 25, 2022 | Digital download, streaming | Star Music |

== See also ==
- BGYO discography
- List of BGYO live performances
