= He's Into Her (song) =

2021 single by BGYO

Single by BGYO

from the album: The Light (original); He's Into Her Season 2 Original Soundtrack (remix)
- Released: April 23, 2021 (original); May 27, 2022 (remix)
- Recorded: 2021
- Studio: The Purple Room, Quezon City
- Genre: Synth-pop; EDM; Pinoy pop; pop-punk; teen pop; bubblegum pop
- Length: 4:02
- Label: Star
- Songwriters: Jonathan Manalo; Gabriel Tagadtad
- Producer: Manalo

BGYO singles chronology
"The Light" (2021)	"He's Into Her" (2021)	"Feel Good Pilipinas" (2021)

Music video
- "He's Into Her" on YouTube

"He's Into Her" is a song recorded by Filipino boy band BGYO, after their debut single "The Light" (2021). The song was released on April 23, 2021, as the official soundtrack of iWantTFC's digital Philippine romance comedy series He's Into Her. The song was written and composed by Jonathan Manalo and Gabriel Tagadtad; and was one of the BGYO songs—"Kundiman", "He's Into Her", "The Baddest"—chosen to be part of The Lunar Codex's "Polaris Collection" time capsules bound to the Moon in 2023.

"He's Into Her" debuted on iTunes Philippines at number one, hours before its official release and it marked as BGYO's second single to reach this spot, after "The Light". The accompanying song's lyric distribution video and the visualizer video also trended in YouTube Philippines, consecutively.

== Composition and lyrics ==
"He's Into Her" is a Synth-pop genre-bending Original Pilipino Music or P-Pop infuses with Electronic music elements. It runs for a total of four minutes and two seconds. The song is set in common time with a tempo of 126 beats per minute and written in the key of A major. The lyrics were written in English by Jonathan Manalo and Gabriel Tagadtad, arranged and mixed by Theo Martel and mastered by Jett Galindo.

Rafael Bautista of Nylon Manila cited in his article "this upbeat song is about the boys being head over heels over a girl". JE CC of lionhearttv.net cited in his review "He's Into Her is a frisky, electropop ballad, that narrates that magical moment when stars seemingly get aligned, and the time becomes right for the romance to bloom".

The song will make listeners fall in love again.

— Gelo, Manila Bulletin

== Background and release ==
Prior to the official announcement of the song "He's Into Her", series of teasers of the audio track were posted on different social media platforms.

"He's Into Her" premiered on Star Music YouTube channel as a song's lyric distribution video and its official track was released worldwide via digital download. On the same day, a visualizer video was released.

The official music video of "He's Into Her" was released on May 4, 2021.

== Reception ==
International fans considered "He's Into Her" as the newest pop anthem perfect for summer. JE CC of lionhearttv.net shared in his review "BGYO's latest single reminds us of a summer romance and that takes its listener somewhere in time—90s". Queenie Lasta of villagepipol.com cited in her article "He's Into Her offers that kilig and romance Pinoys definitely love".

== Promotion ==
=== Online show ===
On April 9, 2021, BGYO officially performed the teasers of the song "He's Into Her" live, for the first time, on Kumu. On May 29, 2021, the group also took part on the virtual red carpet premiere of the series "He's Into Her". On June 6, 2021, BGYO performed the song during the "BGYO Live Zoom Party", a virtual international fan meet, held via Zoom. The group also attended the virtual thanksgiving party of He's Into Her on June 10, 2021.

=== Radio ===
The group got the chance to be interviewed on SBS PopAsia on June 10, 2021, as part of the "He's Into Her" release.

=== Television ===
On April 25, 2021, BGYO performed the full track of "He's Into Her" live, for the first time, on ASAP Natin 'To. The live performance showcased BGYO's new dance choreography in high school uniform outfits. On May 29, 2021, the group performed the song live on It's Showtime. The day after, BGYO performed it on ASAP Natin 'To along with the casts of the series He's Into Her. On August 7, 2021, BGYO performed "He's Into Her" on MYX Music Awards 2021 stage for the first time.

== Music video ==
Prior to the official release of "He's Into Her" music video, teasers were posted throughout the social media by Star Music.

The music video for "He's Into Her" was produced by YouMeUs MNL, directed by Amiel Kirby Balagtas and written by Edgar Dale Reciña. The music video was presented inside a campus wherein Gelo, Akira, JL, Mikki, and Nate portray students as they found a journal about young love. The opening scene features a school hallway accompanied by a strong harmonies of the track, then leads to the magical narration of the typical student's activities in the classroom, interspersed with the sleek choreography and dance breaks along with a book.

"He's Into Her" official music video surpassed 100,000 YouTube Views 5 hours after its release.

== Credits and personnel ==
Credits adapted from the description of BGYO's "He's Into Her" music video.

- Words & Music by Jonathan Manalo, Gabriel Tagadtad
- Arranged & Mixed by Theo Martel
- All Vocals Arranged & Recorded by Jonathan Manalo at The Purple Room Studios
- Mastered by Jett Galindo at The Bakery USA
- Over-all Production by Jonathan Manalo

== Other versions ==
- On June 25, 2021, Filipina musician SAB released the revival of the song as a Digital Single. SAB's version runs for a total of two minutes and forty seconds. The song is set in common time with a tempo of 126 beats per minute and written in the key of C major.
- On August 6, 2021, Filipino actor Donny Pangilinan released the slow and more romantic version of the song as a Digital Single. Donny's version runs for a total of four minutes and eight seconds. The song is set in common time with a tempo of 95 beats per minute and written in the key of E major.

== In popular culture ==
- "He's Into Her" is used as the promotional track in the teaser trailer released on April 24, 2021, and the official trailer released on May 1, 2021, by iWantTFC for the teen romance digital series He's Into Her
- On April 30, 2021, BGYO introduced a dance challenge via TikTok with the hashtag #HIHDanceChallenge.
- On December 11, 2022, the track was used as the challenge in the Philippine television talent search Dream Maker.

== Awards and nominations ==
=== Asian Academy Creative Awards ===
Year	Award	Results	Host country
2021	Best Theme Song or Title Theme (Philippines)	Won	Singapore

== See also ==
- BGYO discography
- List of BGYO live performances
