= Feel Good Pilipinas =

2021 single by BGYO and KZ Tandingan

Song by KZ Tandingan and BGYO
- Language: English; Filipino
- Released: May 21, 2021 (original); June 4, 2021 (extended remix)
- Recorded: 2021
- Genre: Pinoy pop
- Length: 3:55 (original); 4:24 (extended remix)
- Label: Star
- Songwriter(s): Lawrence Arvin Sibug; Robert Labayen
- Producer(s): Thyro Alfaro; Francis Salazar

ABS-CBN Summer Station ID chronology
"Summer is Love" (2019)	"Feel Good Pilipinas" (2021)

BGYO singles chronology
"He's Into Her" (2021)	"Feel Good Pilipinas" (2021)	"Runnin'" (2021)

KZ Tandingan singles chronology
"Bagong Umaga" (2021)	"Feel Good Pilipinas" (2021)	"Dodong" (2021)

Music video
- "Feel Good Pilipinas" on YouTube

"Feel Good Pilipinas" is a song recorded by KZ Tandingan and BGYO. The official track was released on 21 May 2021 by Star Music and it surpassed 100,000 streams on Spotify three weeks after of its release. It was produced for ABS-CBN's Summer Special ID 2021.

== Composition and lyrics ==
"Feel Good Pilipinas" is an upbeat song that runs for a total of three minutes and fifty-five seconds. The song is set in common time with a tempo of 130 beats per minute and written in the key of B minor. The lyrics were written in English and Filipino by Lawrence Arvin Sibug and Robert Labayen, composed by Thyro Alfaro and Francis Salazar and translated to full English by Maria Lourdes Parawan.

== Background and release ==
"Feel Good Pilipinas" was first revealed on different social media platforms on 7 May 2021. A week after, the official dance video was released, accompanied by a dance challenge choreographed by Mickey Perz. The lyric video was released on 20 May 2021, via YouTube. On 4 June 2021, an extended remix version of the track was released via digital download, accompanied by a lyric video uploaded on YouTube, remixed by DJ DLS and it runs for a total of four minutes and twenty-four seconds.

== Reception ==
Justin Alexandra Convento of metro.style cited in her article "Feel Good Pilipinas is the summer-themed anthem that will lift your spirits". Take Off Philippines also cited "this might be one of the great ways to reconnect with family and friends while sharing light and joy during such a tough time" Rafael Bautista of Nylon Manila have cited on his article "the song is a summer bop that makes us feel like we can go outside and have fun in the sun".

== Promotion ==
=== Television ===
"Feel Good Pilipinas" debuted on ASAP Natin 'To stage on 16 May 2021, KZ Tandingan and BGYO performed it live together with several Kapamilya artists. The day after, BGYO performed the dance challenge on Magandang Buhay.

== Music video ==
The music video of "Feel Good Pilipinas" was officially released on 30 May 2021, where it featured various Kapamilya artists and Filipinos all over the world. A week after of its release, it surpassed a million YouTube views.

== Credits and personnel ==
Credits adapted from YouTube.

- Lyrics by Robert Labayen, Lawrence Arvin Sibug
- English Translation by Maria Lourdes Parawan
- Composers: Thyro Alfaro, Francis Salazar
- Remixed by DJ DLS
- Star Music Digital Production Team
  - Digital Content Producer: Jaliza Baluyut
  - Graphics and Cover Art: Andrew Castillo
  - Digital Support Specialist: Ice Almazan
  - Head, Digital Content Production: William Garcia
- ADProm Team
  - Head: Jeff Victoria
  - Specialist: Franz Garcia
  - Social Media Specialist: Naomi Enriquez
- Music Marketing and Promo Head: Jeff Victoria
- Digital Music Marketing Team Leader: Naomi Enriquez
- Published by Star Songs
  - Head, Star Songs and New Media: Atty Marivic Benedicto
  - Officer, Music Publishing: Beth Faustino
  - Specialist, Music Publishing: Ma. Luisa Ponceca
  - Digital Publisher: Jam Esquillo
- Label Head: Mela Ballano
- Creative Director: Jonathan Manalo
- Executive Producer: Roxy Liquigan

== In popular culture ==
- On 16 May 2021, a dance challenge was introduced on ASAP Natin 'To, accepted by the Your Face Sounds Familiar Season 3 family and on social media with the hashtag #FeelGoodPilipinas and #FeelGoodPilipinasDance.
- On 11 June 2021, The Filipino Channel announced the "Feel Good Pilipinas Global Independence Day Caravan" to be participated by BGYO, Arci Muñoz, Morissette Amon, Jayda, Martin Nievera and Jed Madela.
- In 2022, the song is also used as its closing song for the general commentary program, Kabayan (hosted by Noli de Castro), as its permanent replacement to What a Wonderful World. The latter song was actually sung by Louis Armstrong and Kenny G.

== See also ==
- BGYO discography
- List of BGYO live performances
