= Runnin' (BGYO and Keiko Necesario song) =

2021 single by BGYO and Keiko Necesario

Single by BGYO and Keiko Necesario
- Language: English; Filipino
- Released: 18 June 2021
- Recorded: 2021
- Genre: Pop
- Length: 3:28
- Label: Star Music
- Songwriters: Keiko Necesario; BGYO; Akira Morishita; Gelo Rivera; JL Toreliza; Mikki Claver; Nate Porcalla

BGYO singles chronology
"Feel Good Pilipinas" (2021)	"Runnin'" (2021)	"While We Are Young" (2021)

Keiko Necesario singles chronology
"Paos" (2020)	"Runnin'" (2021)	"The Light" (2021)

Lyric video
- "Runnin'" on YouTube

"Runnin'" is a collaboration single of the Filipino boy group BGYO and Filipino singer-songwriter Keiko Necesario. The official track was released on 18 June 2021 as a Digital Single by Star Music. It was BGYO's second single to co-write after The Light and the second collaboration track after Feel Good Pilipinas with KZ Tandingan. It was produced virtually as part of the 4th Season of Coke Studio: Itodo Mo Beat Mo.

"Runnin'" surpassed 20,000 streams on Spotify a week after of its release.

== Composition and lyrics ==
"Runnin'" is a moody song that runs for a total of three minutes and twenty-eight seconds. The song is set in common time with a tempo of 98 beats per minute and written in the key of B major. Most of its lyrics were written in Filipino, except with the Hook and Bridge part as it was written in English, composed by Keiko Necesario and BGYO (Akira Morishita, Gelo Rivera, JL Toreliza, Mikki Claver, Nate Porcalla).

Underoneceiling.com labeled "Runnin'" as "a contemporary pop ballad that contains elements of R&B".

"Minsan nililimitahan natin ang sarili natin dahil sa mga nangyayari sa buhay natin, pero dapat nating ma-remind din at ma-encourage doon sa katotohanan na nagbabago ang takbo ng panahon".

— Keiko Necesario, ABS-CBN News

"we hope this song will help people breathe muna, magpahinga muna sa mga problems".

— Mikki, ABS-CBN News

Let’s keep running through our lives, let’s keep pushing forward, let’s keep reaching our goals.

— Akira, ABS-CBN News

== Background and release ==
"Runnin'" was first revealed on the fourth episode of Coke Studio: Itodo Mo Beat Mo on 20 May 2021. The official lyric video was first uploaded on YouTube by Coke Studio Philippines, on 21 May 2021.

On 18 June 2021, the track was officially released as a single via digital download accompanied by a new lyric video uploaded by Star Music on YouTube.

The official music video was premiered on Coke Studio Philippines' YouTube channel on 13 July 2021.

== Reception ==
JE C.C. of Dailypedia considered the single as "the perfect mental health awareness campaign song, [that] recounts our gloomy and depressing moments first, reminding us that happiness is a choice and that we can easily shrug off our bad moments by deciding to move forward". The Filipino News described the track as "a song, about pushing on, despite challenges". Underoneceiling.com called the song "the first non-upbeat track of BGYO with smooth vocals". Star Cinema have cited "major LSS with BGYO and Keiko Necesario's new song Runnin'".

== Music video ==
The music video of "Runnin'" was produced by Coke Studio Philippines as part of the 57th episode of the 4th Season of Coke Studio: Itodo Mo Beat Mo and was presented in an amusement park wherein BGYO (Gelo, Akira, JL, Mikki, Nate) and Keiko Necesario having fun and enjoying their time, with photographs flashing throughout the song.

== See also ==
- BGYO discography
- List of BGYO live performances
