= On Demand (EP) =

EP by BGYO
- Released: June 4, 2026
- Genres: Pop; R&B; hip-hop
- Length: 19:44
- Languages: English; Tagalog
- Label: Star
- Producers: Darren Cashwell; Aaron Paris; Pontus "Oneye" Kalm; William Leong; Lindgren; Samuel Yun; Mart Sam Emmanuel Olavides; Bojam; Tommy Brown

BGYO chronology
| Headlines (2025) | On Demand (2026) |

Singles from On Demand
- 1. "Fresh" Released: February 19, 2026

On Demand is the third extended play (EP) by Filipino boy band BGYO. It was released on June 4, 2026, through Star Music. It consists of seven tracks with "Fresh" released as a single. It was produced by Darren Cashwell, Aaron Paris, Pontus "Oneye" Kalm, William Leong, Lindgren, Samuel Yun, Mart Sam Emmanuel Olavides, Bojam, Tommy Brown.

== Background and release ==
On February 19, 2026, BGYO released a single, titled "Fresh", through Star Music. The group announced their upcoming EP, with "Fresh" as the lead single. It was released on June 4, 2026. The group also announced the launch at SM Mall of Asia Music Hall, in support of the EP.

== Composition ==
The EP blends pop, R&B, and hip-hop influences. "Fresh" was written by BGYO member Mikki, and combines hip-hop influences with confidence, resulting in the group's smoothest empowerment song, emphasizing the importance of being oneself. "Forever Tonight" is a heartfelt track about the desire to make a fleeting moment last forever. "Life's Too Short" is described as a groovy serenade track. "Mean Girl" and "Trono" are identified as energetic dance-pop tracks. "Raindrop" is described as a heartfelt R&B song. "Sinta" combines pop melodies with Latin-inspired rhythms.

== Track listing ==
On Demand track listing
| No. | Title | Writer(s) | Producer(s) | Length |
|---|---|---|---|---|
| 1. | "Fresh" | Michael Claver Jr. | Michael Claver Jr. (Note: denotes a vocal producer); Darren Cashwell | 2:24 |
| 2. | "Forever Tonight" | Aaron Paris; Dan Henig; Gaby Ramirez; Michael Claver Jr.; Nathaniel Porcalla; Pontus Kalm | Aaron Paris; Pontus "Oneye" Kalm; Greg Shiling | 2:47 |
| 3. | "Life's Too Short" | William Leong; Rosemarie Tan; William "Will Jay" Behlendorf; Shan Poovriyakul | William Leong; Jerwin Nicomedez | 3:22 |
| 4. | "Mean Girl" | Lindgren; Aaron Paris; Dan Henig; Alma Goodman; Trisha Denise; Michael Claver Jr.; Nathaniel Porcalla | Lindgren; Aaron Paris; Greg Shiling | 3:07 |
| 5. | "Raindrop" | Samuel Yun; Rosemarie Tan; Julian Bell; Michael Claver Jr. | Samuel Yun; Rosemarie Tan | 2:57 |
| 6. | "Trono" | John Michael Conchada; Mart Sam Emmanuel Olavides | Mart Sam Emmanuel Olavides; Bojam; Jerwin Nicomedez | 3:15 |
| 7. | "Sinta" | Aaron Paris; Tommy Brown; Jonathan Bach; Courtlin Jabrae Edwards; Khimo Gumatay; Michael Claver Jr.; Nathaniel Porcalla | Aaron Paris; Tommy Brown; Greg Shiling | 1:58 |
| Total length: | | | | 19:44 |
