= Tumitigil ang Mundo =

2022 Single by BGYO

"Tumitigil Ang Mundo"

Single by BGYO

from the album Be Us
- Language: Filipino
- Released: July 13, 2022
- Recorded: 2022
- Studio: AORG Studio
- Genre: Electro-pop; Techno; Dance Pop
- Length: 4:07
- Label: Star Music
- Songwriters: FlipMusic's Marcial Domingo Antonio; Frederico Miguel Claveria; Julius James De Belen
- Producer: Julius James De Belen of FlipMusic

BGYO singles chronology
"Best Time" (2022)	"Tumitigil Ang Mundo" (2022)	"Patuloy Lang Ang Lipad" (2022)

Music video
- "Tumitigil Ang Mundo" on YouTube

"Tumitigil Ang Mundo" (transl. The World Stops) is a song recorded by Filipino boy band BGYO released on 13 July 2022. The track is the first single of their upcoming sophomore album, written and composed by Marcial Domingo Antonio, Frederico Miguel Claveria, and Julius James De Belen of FlipMusic Productions, who has also worked with Sarah Geronimo's hit song "Tala".

== Composition and lyrics ==
"Tumitigil Ang Mundo" is a giddy track that runs for a total of four minutes and seven seconds. The song is set in common time with a tempo of 126 beats per minute and written in the key of C♯/D♭ major. The lyrics were written in Filipino, arranged, mixed and mastered by several musicians and producers from the local sound production house FlipMusic, that tackles about young love and the feeling of how someone's surrounding would crawl slowly and be magical whenever that character sees the person he/she love.

"Tumitigil Ang Mundo" is one of BGYO's brightest song to date...the electric energy of the song is enhanced by a dancey pop beat with slight hints of techno in the opening and chorus that breaks down for Mikki and Gelo's rap verses.

— RAFAEL BAUTISTA, Nylon Manila

== Background and release ==
"Tumitigil Ang Mundo" is the first original song of BGYO released over the last nine months that is not part of the original soundtrack. The snippet of the track was first heard weeks before the actual date of release via Star Music's social media platforms. It trended on Twitter as the ACEs anticipated the official release. The track and its music video was released on 13 July 2022.

== Reception ==
Rafael Bautista of Nylon Manila shared in an article "Even though summer may be over, "Tumitigil Ang Mundo" feels like a great summer jam to move to". JE CC of the Lionheartv.net describe the song as "the fusion of disco and pop vibes turns the new track into a certified P-POP throbber, that is hard to resist jiving along once the play button is pressed". In their performance of the track on 13 September 2022 in the Philippines' noontime show It's Showtime, the hosts praised "Tumitigil Ang Mundo" with Vice Ganda saying "Para tayong dinalaw ng bagyo rito diba! Ang lakas ng datingan ng sayawan at kantahan. Ang ganda-ganda ng kanta niyo. (transl. It feels like a typhoon visited us here, right! What a powerful performance. Your song is beautiful.)"

== Promotion ==
=== Live performances ===
BGYO's first ever live performance of "Tumitigil Ang Mundo" happened at the Mall of Asia via "Tugatog Music Festival", on 15 July 2022 and on the "BE YOU: The World will Adjust Benefit Concert", on 22 July 2022. In July 23, they also performed "Tumitigil Ang Mundo" at the Resorts World Manila as a part of the Star Magic's kick-off for the "Beyond The Stars Concert Tour".

=== Television ===
On 24 July 2022, "Tumitigil Ang Mundo" debuts on ASAP Natin 'To stage. On 13 September 2022, BGYO performed the track on It's Showtime. On 23 October 2022, BGYO performed the track on ASAP Natin 'To.

=== Virtual ===
On 8 September 2022, the group performed the track on the Lazada 9.9 Megasale Super Show. (Note: "The debut of the group in the show, with their opening and closing performances.")

== Music video ==
The music video for "Tumitigil Ang Mundo" was produced by Chapters PH, directed by Karlo Calingao. It was presented inside a theme park in the Philippines named Enchanted Kingdom. The opening scene was set in a photo studio wherein Gelo, Akira, JL, Mikki, and Nate mesmerized on a girl, Aiyanna Waggoner, that passed by on them while having a photoshoot. As the instrumental goes on, the boys follow the girl in a magical portal that leads them into the theme park. The boys of BGYO dressed up in a cool, comfortable and summery outfits chasing after a girl around the amusement park interspersed with sleek, electrifying and bubbly choreography. The music video ends up inside the photo studio with the boys staring on each other thinking of what had happened.

== Credits and personnel ==
All song credits are adapted from the official music video of "Tumitigil Ang Mundo" via BGYO's YouTube channel, unless otherwise noted.

- Composer: Marcial Domingo Antonio, Frederico Miguel Claveria & Julius James De Belen of FlipMusic.
- Arranger: Jumbo De Belen of FlipMusic
- Vocal Arranger: Jumbo De Belen, Marcial Domingo Antonio & Frederico Miguel Claveria of FlipMusic
- BGYO Vocal Coach: Jerwin Nicomedez
- Recording Engineer: Jeremy Glinoga at the AORG Studio
- Producer: Bojam of FlipMusic
- Mixed & Mastered: Mat Olavides of FlipMusic
- Over-all Album/Project Supervising Producer: Jonathan Manalo

== In popular culture ==
- On 23 July 2022, "Tumitigil Ang Mundo" was used in the pasarela challenge of the segment "Showtime's Sexy Babe Grand Finals" on It's Showtime.
- "Tumitigil Ang Mundo" was used as the "Wildcard Song" in the Philippine pinoy pop idol group search "Top Class".

== Release history ==
Country	Date	Format	Version	Label
Various	July 13, 2022	Airplay, Digital download, streaming, video streaming	Single	Star Music
Various	November 3, 2022	Airplay, Digital download, streaming, video streaming	Be Us Album	Star Music
Various	November 25, 2022	Airplay, Digital download, streaming, video streaming	An Inconvenient Love Original Soundtrack - EP	Star Music

== See also ==
- BGYO discography
- List of BGYO live performances
