= Kulay =

Filipino musical band

- Origin: Philippines
- Years active: 1991-2000
- Past members: Boom Dayupay; Radha Cuadrado; Jeannie Oakman; Angel Jones

Kulay were a band from the Philippines comprising Boom Dayupay and some combination of his then-girlfriend Jeannie Oakman, cousin Radha Cuadrado, and future wife Angel Jones. They released the albums 100,000 Pesos Worth of Karma, Flavour of da Moment, Vibestation, and Chapter What?! between 1995 and 1999 as well as the UK singles chart entries "Delicious" and "Burn". In addition, a music video for their cover of The Isley Brothers' "Shout" was nominated for 1998's International Viewer's Choice Award at the 1998 MTV Video Music Awards.

== Biography ==
Kulay was founded in 1991 by Boom Dayupay, a Filipino whose family had moved to Vancouver in 1977, and his girlfriend Jeannie Oakman, a white Canadian with whom Dayupay had moved to the Philippines for the occasion. The pair were later joined by Dayupay's then-15-year-old cousin Radha Cuadrado, an Indian who had previously been in Ryan Cayabyab's K-14 group. Dayupay named the group Kulay after the Filipino word for 'colour' due to the band's wide range of ethnicities.

Their 1995 debut album 100,000 Pesos Worth of Karma took its name from the cost of settling a dispute with a former manager and their 1996 sophomore Flavour of da Moment featured songs that won a Katha Award and an Awit Award. The former was written entirely by Dayupay but for a take on George Gershwin's "Summertime" and contained multiple types of rhythm and blues including rap, soul, and old-school R&B, while the latter diversified into large amounts of rap and funk. Neither were particularly successful, although tracks from both albums later formed Kulay: OPM Timeless Collection Gold Series 4, which also featured a take on The Clash's "Should I Stay or Should I Go".

The band released a further album, August 1997's Vibestation, on Sony Music Philippines. Two weeks after the band signed a contract with Dance Pool, Oakman died from an epileptic seizure aged 26, following which its surviving members took six months off before touring with Angel Jones, the mother of Tony Labrusca. Vibestation featured the UK singles chart entries "Delicious" and "Burn" and a cover of the The Isley Brothers's "Shout"; "Delicious" was performed by Kulay for the film Virtual Sexuality and peaked at No. 73 in the UK, "Burn" was remixed by Fatboy Slim and Judge Jules, and "Shout" was nominated for 1998's International Viewer's Choice Award at the 1998 MTV Video Music Awards. The album gave its name to a 1999 TV5 series featuring the band interviewing people from that country.

The band subsequently signed to Columbia Records and released the albums Remixes and Chapter What?!. Remixes comprised "Delicious", "Burn", five remixes of the former, and remixes of "Burn" by Fatboy Slim and Judge Jules, while Chapter What?! featured the singles "Ask for More" and "Get Down", which were subsequently used in commercials for Pepsi and Epson. The band disbanded in 2000 after Cuadrado left, with Jones and Dayupay subsequently marrying.

== Selected discography ==
=== Albums ===
- 100,000 Pesos Worth of Karma (1995)
- Flavour of da Moment (1996)
- Vibestation (1997)
- Remixes (1999)
- Chapter What?! (1999)

=== Singles ===
- "Delicious" – UK #73
- "Burn" – UK #98
- "Ask for More"
- "Get Down"
