= The Light (BGYO song) =

2021 single by BGYO

- Official standard cover art

Single by BGYO

from the album The Light
- Language: English; Filipino
- Released: 29 January 2021
- Recorded: 2021
- Length: 3:12
- Label: Star Music (ABS-CBN)
- Songwriters: Distract; BGYO (Gelo, Akira, JL, Mikki and Nate)
- Composers: Rogan; Ddank
- Producers: Rogan; Ddank

BGYO singles chronology
"The Light" (2021)	"He's Into Her" (2021)

Music video
- "The Light" on YouTube

"The Light" is the debut single of the Filipino boy group BGYO. It was released on 29 January 2021 as a Digital Single by Star Music. Written by the band members Gelo, Nate, Akira, Mikki and JL along with Distract, who has worked with SISTAR, NCT and GOT7; composed and arranged by Rogan and Ddank; mixing, mastering, and digital editing were done by Jang Tae In at Seoul Archive.

"The Light" surpassed 100,000 streams on Spotify in less than two weeks after its release and fifty-three days after, the song became part of Spotify's "RADAR Philippines 2021 Roster".

The music video of "The Light" has received more than a million YouTube views, 6 days after its release, and its the fastest debut music video by a P-pop group to reach 1 Million views in YouTube. It also broke the record for being the "Most Liked Music Video in a Debut Song" by a P-pop group of all time.

== Composition and lyrics ==
"The Light" is a powerful genre-bending Original Pilipino Music or P-Pop infused with R&B, progressive Hip hop and Electronic music elements. It runs for a total of three minutes and twelve seconds. The song is set in common time with a tempo of 90 beats per minute and written in the key of A♯/B♭ minor. Most of its lyrics were written in English, except with the Pre-chorus and Bridge part as it was written in Filipino by BGYO to reflect their own story in the song.

The song is a power anthem with an uplifting message that "speaks about empowerment, hope, and self-love".

Angelo De Cartagena of Nylon Manila cited in his article, "The Light, is a single that mixes elements of ear-friendly pop and infectious electro-dance, the drops of the beats and bass is more than enough to get you up and at it yourself". JE C.C. of Dailypedia praised the single, stating that "This track may be upbeat and filled with electropop elements, but its lyrics don't just empower your moves; they energize your soul too".

== Background and release ==
"The Light" premiered on Star Music YouTube channel late night of 28 January 2021 in the Philippines as a lyric video and on 29 January 2021, it was officially released worldwide via digital download.

The official music video of "The Light" has been released on BGYO's official YouTube channel right after the international "Filomenon" fan con event as part of "Be The Light: The BGYO Launch".

On 19 February 2021, three weeks after the worldwide debut of "The Light", BGYO released the performance video of the track. In contrast to the official music video, the performance video focused on the choreography of "The Light," which was created by South Korea's LAY BACK. The new visuals in various settings were also presented in the performance video. A fresh location is added this time where Gelo, Akira, JL, Nate, and Mikki is dancing an open field, with a drone camera capturing their performance.

On 26 February 2021, a week after the release of the performance video, BGYO released the dance rehearsal video of the track. Similar with the performance video, the dance rehearsal video focused on the choreography but the setting is by far different, as it was purely taken outdoors and in just one frame; no special effects; no frame transitions; no change outfits, it only showcased the dance skills and synchronization as a whole.

== Critical reception ==
Sherilyn Ramon of The Philippine Times shared in her article "I quickly became a fan after seeing their performances online. They are deserving of our support, not only because they're our kababayan but also because they really are worthy of it."

John Bueno of kumagcow.com noted that "I'm telling you, they definitely have good reason to put these guys together, and if they go international, I wouldn't be surprised if a lot of girls would go gaga over them."

Angelo De Cartagena of Nylon Manila cited "At first listen, the vocals and harmonies could easily be mistaken as something from their K-pop contemporaries, but with lashing of distinctly Filipino elements, including a melody that eases into the bridge, you immediately get a sense that BGYO belongs in the same league that pervades our listening habits".

== Promotion ==
=== Live performances ===
On 29 October 2022, the group performed "The Light" on the first ever K-pop Halloween Concert in the Philippines—Hallyuween 2022.

=== Online show ===
As part of the online concert, "Be The Light: The BGYO Launch", the fans were delighted with the sneak live performance of The Light before the official release of the music video. The full length of the online concert also aired and re-broadcast in the Philippines via A2Z Channel 11, Kapamilya Channel, Kapamilya Online Live and iWantTFC on 7 February 2021, while in the United States of America, in Europe, in the Middle East and in Guam by Myx TV on 13 February 2021.

The day after the BGYO launch, the band appeared on PopCinema hosted by MJ Felipe and Bianca Gonzales.

On 8 March 2021, the band promoted the single on We Rise Together via Rise Artists Studio official YouTube channel. It was simulcast via Rise Artists Studio and Star Cinema Facebook pages and on iWant TFC. Six days after, the band appeared on I Feel U hosted by Toni Gonzaga wherein, three lucky fans were given the chance to interact with BGYO virtually.

On 19 March 2021, the band performed "The Light" in a collaborative virtual show along with other "Kapamilya Stars" from the different talent management arms of ABS-CBN entitled "Big 4 Hours" through the official channel of Star Magic in Kumu and simulcast via Facebook.

On 22 May 2021, BGYO performed the remix version of "The Light" on "Eleksyon 2022 Koalisyon's" "#RegiToVote Campaign" through "Love Kita Pinas", a virtual campaign that hopes to mobilize and encourage Filipino citizens to register and vote.

On 6 June 2021, BGYO performed the song during the "BGYO Live Zoom Party", a virtual international fan meet, held via Zoom.

=== Radio ===
On April 21, 2021, BGYO officially debuted on the popular Wish 107.5 Bus and performed their smash hit "The Light".

=== Television ===
BGYO performed the full length of "The Light" for the first time live on ASAP Natin 'To on 31 January 2021.

On 5 February 2021, BGYO grace the It's Showtime stage as they perform "The Light" live.

In the 82nd episode of Pinoy Big Brother: Connect aired on 25 February 2021, BGYO performed the dance choreography of "The Light", during their Big Brother house visit, as requested by Big Brother to motivate the housemates for their P-POP weekly task.

On 7 March 2021, BGYO opened the Sunday noontime concert program ASAP Natin 'To, singing and dancing to "The Light" with Philippines "Mr. Pure Energy" Gary Valenciano. The performance also marked as their come back in the show and it had a social media abuzz, with the phrase BGYO ASAPComeback among the list of top Philippines and Worldwide trends on Twitter, generating over 66,000 tweets.

BGYO appeared also in the morning news show of Teleradyo called "Sakto" on 9 March 2021 hosted by Amy Perez, Jeff Canoy and Johnson Manabat. It was simulcast online via ABS-CBN News YouTube channel and Teleradyo's Facebook live and it had a social media abuzz, with a hashtag #BGYOonSakto and a phrase BGYO SaktoOnStage peaked in the Philippines trends on Twitter at number 3 and 4, respectively.

They also performed the electrifying rock version of "The Light" in the Pinoy Big Brother: Connect @ The Big Night on 14 March 2021. The video clip of this performance was also uploaded in the YouTube channel of Pinoy Big Brother, with more than 100,000 views in less than 24 hours.

On 19 September 2021, BGYO teamed up with BINI on a ASAP Natin 'To performance with "The Light" and Born to Win.

On 2 May 2022, BGYO performed the short a cappella version of "The Light" on Arirang's TV show Simply K-Pop Con-Tour simulcast via online.

== Music video ==
Fifteen days before the music video was uploaded, video clips and photo teasers were posted on BGYO's official accounts in Facebook, Instagram, Twitter and YouTube.

The video for "The Light" was directed by Kring Kim. The opening scene features a quote "Within you lies immense power. Your light can change the world.", then leads to the narrative transitions of flash-forward scenes of the music video showcasing the members' portrayal of the youths' common problems today like mental health (Akira's scenes), violence and bullying (Nate's scenes), identity crisis (Gelo's scenes), academic pressure (Mikki's scenes) and social media addiction (JL's scenes), interspersed with an upbeat dance sequences strategized by seasoned Korean choreographers from LAY BACK who worked with k-pop acts like SuperM, Hyolyn, and Zico.

The music video garnered 52,000 YouTube views 5 hours after its release.

On 4 March 2021, the music video surpassed 2 Million views in a span of 34 days after the release, and it also marked as the "Fastest Music Video in a Debut Song" by a P-pop group to reach this milestone.

== Credits and personnel ==
Credits adapted from the description of BGYO's "The Light" music video:

- Lyrics by: Distract and BGYO (Gelo, Mikki, Akira, JL, Nate)
- Composed and Arranged by: Rogan and Ddank
- Chorus by: Distract
- Digital Editing by: Jang Tae In
- Mixing & Mastering by: Jang Tae In at SEOUL ARCHIVE
- Choreography by: LAY BACK (Lee Kwang Taek, Lee Ji Woong, Jeong Woo Ryun, Yun Jong In)
- Production: Key Elements Creative Media
- Director/Producer: Kring Kim
- Visual Director: Danyl Geneciran
- Visual Effects: Edriel Garcia
- Production Manager: Mary Antonette Perez
- Asst. Production Manager: Dyrus Azekiel Almirol
- Production Coordinator: Stephanie Bendero
- Director of Photography: Ian Alexander Guevara
- Camera Asst.: Paolo Gabriel Sancon
- Gaffer: Lonidas Caspe III
- Focus Puller: Ritchie De Padua
- Production Designer: Katrish Aristoki
- Art Dept.: Larry Labrador
- Offline/Online Editor: Martt Nicko Flores
- Colorist: Marilen Magsaysay of Media East Productions
- DIT: Kianne Nicolas
- Production Assistants: John Peter Amoyo, Lance Leo Clemente
- Hair and Make-up: Jaime Sy
- ABS-CBN
  - Ms. Joanna Gomez-Santos – Head, TV Production Operations
  - Tantan Dimapilis – Head, Studio/Remote Operations
  - Louella Ros Tiongson – Technical Services Head
  - Apol Niepes – Head, RPG
  - Jon Raymond Moll - Director
  - Zoilo Gonzales – Technical Director
  - Joey Mallari – Lighting Director

== Keiko Necesario version ==
"The Light"

Single by Keiko Necesario
- Language: English; Filipino
- Released: 2 July 2021
- Recorded: 2021
- Genre: Folk; Indie-pop
- Length: 4:26
- Label: Coke Studio Philippines
- Songwriters: Distract; BGYO (Gelo, Akira, JL, Mikki and Nate)
- Composers: Rogan; Ddank
- Producers: The Coca-Cola Company Far East Limited; UXS, Inc.

Keiko Necesario singles chronology
"Runnin'" (2021)	"The Light" (2021)

Official audio
- "The Light" on YouTube

"The Light" is a revival single of Filipino singer-songwriter Keiko Necesario. The official track was released on 2 July 2021 as a Digital Single by Coke Studio Philippines. It was produced as part of the 4th Season of Coke Studio Philippines' Itodo Mo Beat Mo.

=== Composition ===
Keiko Necesario's version runs for a total of four minutes and twenty-six seconds. The song is set in common time with a tempo of 134 beats per minute and written in the key of F major.

=== Background and release ===
Keiko Necesario's version of "The Light" was first revealed on the second episode of Coke Studio Philippines' Itodo Mo Beat Mo on 18 May 2021. On 2 July 2021, the track was officially released as a single via digital download accompanied by a video provided by Warner Music Philippines on YouTube.

== Other versions ==
- The song was covered for the Philippines reality show Pinoy Big Brother: Connect by the housemates as part of their P-Pop weekly task. It was aired on 28 February 2021, and its the 85th day of the ninth season of Pinoy Big Brother. The housemates namely Ella, Ralph, Liofer, Kobie, Jie-Ann, Chico, Andrea and Amanda, covered the song in the episode, performing a choreographed dance routine to it.

== In popular culture ==
- On 1 February 2021, "The Light" is used as the new wake up call in Pinoy Big Brother: Connect.
- On 7 February 2021, BGYO and Star Music introduced a dance challenge via TikTok with the hashtag #TheLightDanceChallenge.
- On 22 February 2021, the official music video of "The Light" have been played and introduced for the first time to the housemates of Pinoy Big Brother: Connect, as part of Big Brother's weekly task called "PBB Connect's" P-POP. The song have been played throughout the week and in the three episodes of that weekly task, the housemates danced to the tune along with the BGYO and BINI.
- On 6 June 2021, "The Light" is used as one of the Jackpot Round songs in the Philippines community game show Everybody, Sing!.
- "The Light" played on Nickelodeon alongside BTS' "Butter".

== See also ==
- BGYO discography
- List of BGYO live performances
