= Keiko Necesario =

Filipino indie singer-songwriter

- Born: Keiko Necesario; August 10, 1992 (age 33)
- Occupation: Singer-songwriter
- Years active: 2012–present
- Known for: Indie folk-pop releases; album Ready, Let Go; cover of "Both Sides Now" featured in Ackley Bridge

Keiko Necesario (born August 10, 1992) is a Filipino indie singer-songwriter. Her cover of "Both Sides Now" was featured in the British TV drama Ackley Bridge, and she later released her album Ready, Let Go under Warner Music Philippines.

== Early life and background ==
Necesario began writing songs in grade school, encouraged by her parents’ musical influence, and learned guitar in her early teens. She emerged in the indie scene around 2012, participating in songwriting competitions and performing in intimate venues and campus circuits.

== Career ==
Necesario released early singles and EPs independently, building a following through live sets and online performances. In 2020, her folk-driven single "Dangerous" teased a new album cycle.

In 2019, her cover of "Both Sides Now" gained international attention after being featured in Ackley Bridge. She has performed live on radio and digital platforms, including Monster RX93.1 and Wish 107.5.

In 2020, Necesario signed with Warner Music Philippines and released Ready, Let Go, featuring singles like "Ready, Let Go" and "Away From The Current". She discussed the album's themes and the role of art during challenging times in interviews.

In 2024, Necesario released "Kahit Pa Anong Mangyari", described by One Music PH as "pop-rock confessional" about overcoming challenges in married life, faith, and resilience.

== Personal life ==
Necesario announced her engagement to singer Jem Cubil in 2019.

== Discography ==
=== Albums ===
Year	Title	Label	Notes
2020	Ready, Let Go	Warner Music Philippines	Studio album

=== Selected singles ===
Year	Title	Notes
2018	While We Are Young	Live session release
2019	Away From The Current	Live performance at Stages Sessions
2020	Ready, Let Go	Lead single under Warner
2020	Dangerous	Album teaser single
2024	Kahit Pa Anong Mangyari	One Music PH feature

=== Notable covers and placements ===
Year	Track	Placement/Platform
2019	Both Sides Now (cover)	Featured in Ackley Bridge

== Live performances ==
Necesario has performed in various venues, radio concerts, and digital showcases, including Stages Sessions and Route 196. She has also appeared on Monster RX93.1's Concert Series and Wish 107.5 Bus.

== Recognition ==
Necesario's work has been profiled by local and international outlets.

== Awards and nominations ==
Name of the award ceremony, year presented, category, nominee of the award, and the result of the nomination
Award ceremony	Year	Category	Nominee / Work	Result	Ref.
PMPC Star Awards for Music	2017	Female Acoustic Artist of the Year	"Panaginip"	Nominated	
Wish 107.5 Music Awards	2022	Wishclusive Collaboration of the Year	"Balang Araw" (with EJ de Perio)	Nominated	
PMPC Star Awards for Music	2026	Female Acoustic Artist of the Year	"Inay"	Nominated	
PMPC Star Awards for Music	2026	Inspirational Song of the Year	"Inay"	Nominated	
