= The Baddest (BGYO song) =

2021 single by BGYO

Single by BGYO

from the album The Light
- Language: English; Filipino
- Released: August 20, 2021
- Recorded: 2021
- Length: 3:16
- Label: Star
- Songwriters: Tiyon Mack; The Aristocratz; Jonathan Manalo; Angelo Troy Rivera; Akira Morishita
- Composers: Mack; The Aristocratz; Manalo; Rivera; Morishita
- Producer: MU Doctor (뮤닥터)

BGYO singles chronology
"While We Are Young" (2021)	"The Baddest" (2021)	"Kulay (Miss Universe Philippines 2021)" (2021)

Music video
- "The Baddest" on YouTube

"The Baddest" is a song recorded by Filipino boy band BGYO, released on August 20, 2021 as a fifth single of their debut album The Light. It was written and composed by Tha Aristocratz and TC Mack, along with Jonathan Manalo and BGYO's Angelo Troy Rivera and Akira Morishita. The track was one of the BGYO songs—"Kundiman", "He's Into Her", "The Baddest"—chosen to be part of The Lunar Codex's "Polaris Collection" time capsules bound to the Moon in 2023.

"The Baddest" was featured on Spotify's Radar Philippines and New Music Friday Philippines playlists upon its release. Ten days after, it surpassed 200,000 streams on Spotify, the fastest among BGYO songs to hit this benchmark.

The accompanying music video of "The Baddest" has received numerous validation from the netizens, as it trended on YouTube and peaked at number 6 upon its release. Seven days after, its official music video surpassed 1 million views on YouTube, the second fastest music video of the group after, "The Light" and also among the fastest P-pop tracks to hit this milestone.

== Composition and lyrics ==
"The Baddest" runs for a total of three minutes and sixteen seconds, set in common time with a tempo of 93 beats per minute and written in the key of C♯/D♭ major. Most of its lyrics were written in English, except with the rap parts as it was written in Filipino by BGYO's Gelo and Akira that speaks about an absolute appreciation of someone.

The track alone is a revolutionary work for exploring the boys' individual vocal versatility, [that has] earworm chorus which describes a girl as "the baddest of them all" is one that would live rent-free in ACEs heads; the hooks of the track are well-distributed throughout its nearly-200 second runtime.

— JE CC, Lionheartv.net

"The Baddest", captures the group's ideals of a modern dream girl – a captivating mind, confidence, and personality beyond her beauty.

— Lion's Den, Lionheartv.net

BGYO sheds their boy-next-door image with the release of their comeback single, "The Baddest". The gritty yet smooth pop track sees the boys sing about being attracted to a special someone, the aforementioned baddest.

— Rafael Bautista, Nylon Manila

While other songs showed uplifting themes and sweet images, "The Baddest" was more fierce and gruff, but not to the point of aggressive.

— Marielle Filoteo, PARCINQ Magazine

== Background and release ==
Prior to the official release, cryptic video teasers and concept photos circulated in the social media that fuels ACEs (the fans) with theories stemming the involvement of the Filipina actress Liza Soberano on the comeback. The official track of "The Baddest" was released earlier than its official music video on 20 August 2021. Eight days after, the lyric video of "The Baddest" was released.

== Promotion ==
=== Live performances ===
On 29 October 2022, the group performed "The Baddest" on the first ever K-pop Halloween Concert in the Philippines—Hallyuween 2022.

=== Television ===
On 5 September 2021, "The Baddest" debuted on television through ASAP Natin 'To. On 18 September 2021, the group performed it live on It's Showtime.

=== Virtual ===
On 29 August 2021, the group performed "The Baddest" on "Happy Hallyu Day 5: A Virtual Fest". The group also appeared on "Push Bets Live" on 1 September 2021. On 8 September 2022, the group opened the Lazada 9.9 Megasale Super Show with their performance of "The Baddest". (Note: "The debut of the group in the show, with their opening and closing performances.")

== Music video ==
The music video for "The Baddest" was produced by YouMeUs MNL, directed by Amiel Kirby Balagtas and written by Edgar Dale Reciña, who also worked with the group's music video of "He's Into Her". It was presented in a sci-fi action concept wherein Gelo, Akira, JL, Mikki, and Nate played spies of the "ACEs Elite Secret Service" along with the head agent portrayed by Liza Soberano as "Binibining Haliya", taking revenge to Bakunawa - a great and frightening serpent-like dragon in Philippine mythology.

If you've ever had a Liza Soberano-starring, gender-bent "Charlie's Angels"-slash-"Bad Blood" concept in your P-pop bucket list, then thank BGYO's members because, boy, do they have you covered.

— Katrina Maisie Cabral, scoutmag.ph

We are left with a cliffhanger as the boys face their first mission. That growl at the end from the creature or thing in front of them left us wanting more. One thing is for sure, we know BGYO will be coming out on top! Let the mission begin!

— Nino Llanera, MYX

5 of the best moments on BGYO’s "The Baddest" MV that had us on edge until the very end: their new moves, spitting bars in Filipino, when they flexed their Barongs, Liza Soberano's cameo and the post-apocalyptic CGI and cliffhanger.

— Lyn Alumno, Nylon Manila

"The Baddest" is impressive in itself, but what makes it great is the multi-faceted concept it brings to the table. From the visuals and storyline down to song and dance performance, "The Baddest" sees BGYO at their best—their baddest.

— Marielle Filoteo, PARCINQ Magazine

== Use in popular culture ==
- On 8 October 2021, American hip-hop dance crew Jabbawockeez posted a short dance cover of "The Baddest" in different social media platforms and went viral.

== See also ==
- BGYO discography
- List of BGYO live performances
