= List of BGYO live performances =

BGYO live performances
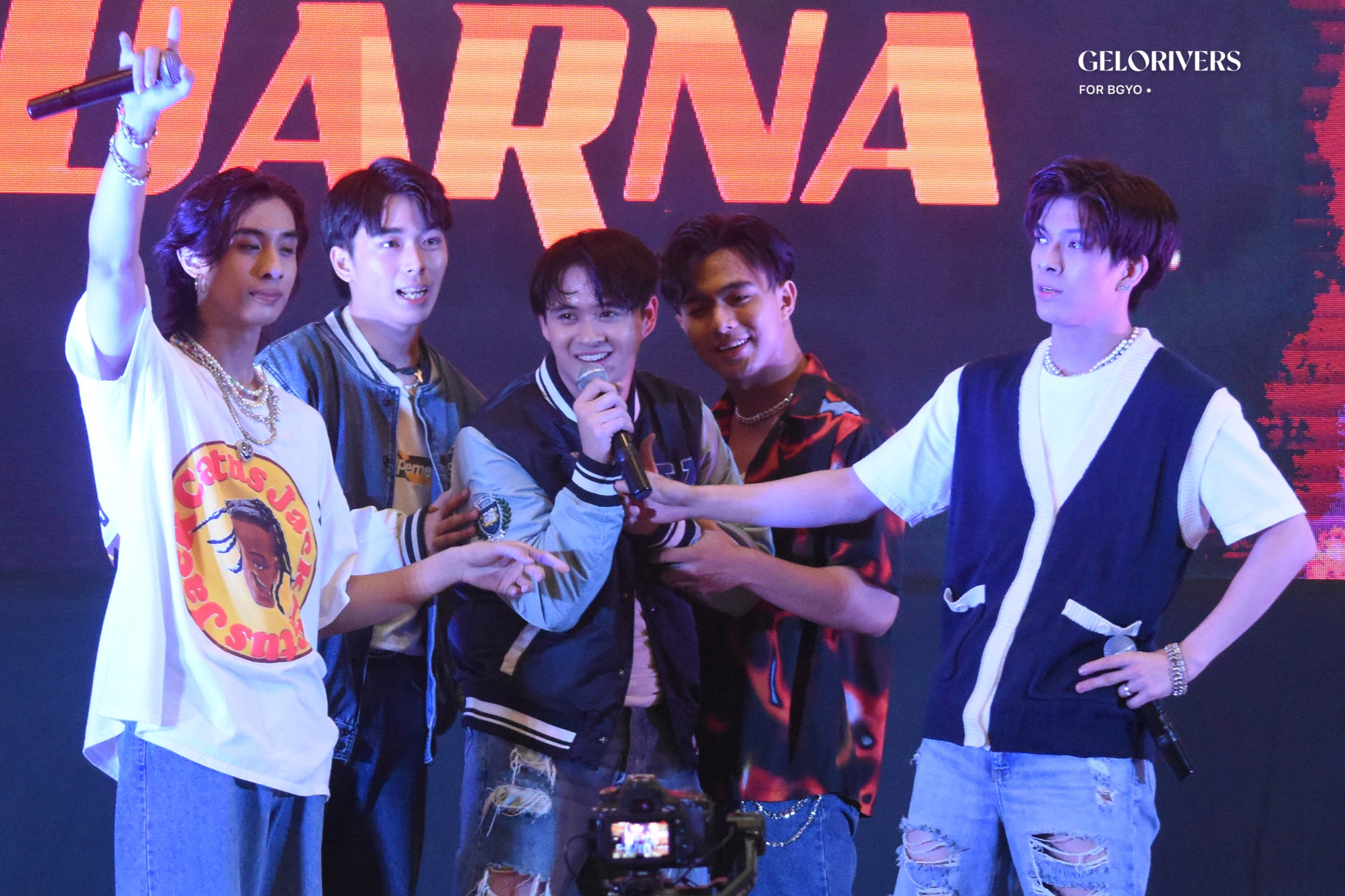
- BGYO performing during the Darna Caravan in 2023
- Concert tours: 1
- Concerts: 4
- Fan meeting tours: 3
- Showcases: 3
- Joint tours: 22
- Award shows and specials: 26

The Filipino boy band BGYO (formerly Star Hunt Academy Boys or SHA Boys) has performed in one concert tours, three fan meeting tours, twenty-two joint tours and concerts, twenty-six performances on award shows and specials, three showcases, and four concerts since their debut in 2021.

In the third quarter of 2022, BGYO embarked on their first ever mall tour—Best Time with BGYO Mall Tour. The band became the only Filipino act, alongside other 6 K-pop idols, to headline the first ever K-pop Halloween Concert in the Philippines—Hallyuween 2022 and made a history to be the first Filipino act to have a concert in the Metaverse—BGYO Celestial Spaces: H&M Concert from the Virtual Universe. As part of their second album Be Us campaign, the group embarked on a US Press promo tour, which includes their visit at the TikTok Headquarters in Los Angeles, their performance on the Wish USA Bus and a street performances at the Time Square and Union Square in New York City.

== Tours ==
Title	Dates	Venue(s)	Associated single(s)/album(s)	Country/Continent(s)	Shows	Gross	Attendance	Ref.
Best Time with BGYO Mall Tour	July 9, 2022; July 17, 2022; August 6, 2022 (Note: "Rescheduled on August 21, 2022")	Ayala Malls Cloverleaf; Ayala Malls Circuit; Market! Market!	Best Time	Manila, Philippines	3	—N/a	—N/a	

== Concerts ==
Year	Date	Title	City	Country	Venue	Attendance	Ref.
2020	January 29	Be The Light: The BGYO Launch	Quezon City	Philippines	ABS-CBN	—N/a	
2022	September 5	TNT Saya Fest sa Tuna Festival (Note: "The event was part of a month-long celebration of General Santos' 24th Tuna Festival and marks as BGYO's first-ever Mindanao show.")	General Santos	Philippines	General Santos City Oval Plaza	—N/a	
2022	September 24–25	BGYO Celestial Spaces: H&M Concert from the Virtual Universe (Note: "The Philippines' first ever concert held in a digital universe and where music meets fashion and style.")	H&M Virtual Universe	Philippines	H&M Virtual Universe	—N/a	
2022	October 11	TNT Saya Fest sa Zamboanga Hermosa	Zamboanga City	Philippines	Zamboanga Grandstand	—N/a	
2025	October 4	BGYO: First Solo Concert	Quezon City	Philippines	New Frontier Theater	TBA	

== Fanmeeting tours ==
Year	Date	Title	City	Country	Venue	Attendance	Ref.
2021	June 6	BGYO Zoom Live Party (Note: "BGYO Zoom Live Party is a virtual international fan meet, held via Zoom".)	Quezon City	Philippines	ABS-CBN	—N/a	
2021	November 21	Global Party Asia Tour (Note: "Global Party Asia Tour is a joint virtual fan meet with BGYO's sibling group BINI for their Indonesian and Thai fans".)	Quezon City	Philippines	ABS-CBN	—N/a	
2022	May 1	Xiaomi Fan Festival 2022	Pasay City	Philippines	SM Mall of Asia Fashion & Music Hall	767	

== Joint tours and concerts ==
Year	Date	Title	City	Country	Venue	Ref.
2020	November 28	#TikTokTogetherPH: A virtual fundraising concert (Note: "A virtual fundraising concert hosted by TikTok Philippines for the benefit of those affected by typhoons which was participated with other artists and vloggers in the Philippines.")	Manila	Philippines	Virtual	
2021	June 11	Feel Good Pilipinas Global Independence Day Caravan (Note: "with Arci Muñoz, Morissette, Jayda, Martin Nievera and Jed Madela")	Dubai	United Arab Emirates	Virtual	
2021	June 12	Feel Good Pilipinas Global Independence Day Caravan		Hong Kong	Virtual	
2021	June 12	Feel Good Pilipinas Global Independence Day Caravan		Malaysia	Virtual	
2021	June 13	Feel Good Pilipinas Global Independence Day Caravan		South Korea	Virtual	
2021	June 20	Feel Good Pilipinas Global Independence Day Caravan		Singapore	Virtual	
2021	June 26	Feel Good Pilipinas Global Independence Day Caravan		United States of America	Virtual	
2021	June 26	ALL FOR ONE (Canadian Multiculturalism Day): Celebrating Unity in Diversity (Note: "with AC Bonifacio, BINI, Darren Espanto, Glisha, Kayla Rivera, rIVerse, and Southeast Cartel")		Canada	Virtual	
2021	August 6	He's Into Her : The Benison Ball (Note: "with He's Into Her casts, Jayda, JC Alcantara, Sab and Gigi De Lana with Gigi Vibes")		Philippines	Aired via live streaming through KTX.ph	
2021	November 6–7	ONE DREAM: The Bini and BGYO Concert (Note: "with Special performances from AC Bonifacio, KZ Tandingan and Kritiko")		Philippines	Aired via live streaming through KTX.ph	
2021	December 3	1MX Dubai 2021 (Filipino Music Festival) (Note: "with Ez Mil, Bamboo, Moira, BINI and Gigi De Lana")	Dubai	United Arab Emirates	Dubai World Trade Centre	
2022	February 12–13	ONE DREAM: The Bini and BGYO Concert Version 2022			Aired via live streaming through KTX.ph	
2022	April 9–10	2022 PPOPCON: The Ultimate P-pop Fan Gathering (Convention and Concert)		Philippines	Convention: New Frontier Theater, Concert: Araneta Coliseum and simulcast via live streaming through KTX.ph	
2022	May 25	A Light of Hope Virtual Concert: for the Youth, their Moms and Educators (Note: "with BINI, John Arcilla, Ebe Dancel, Kiana Valenciano, Ice Seguerra and Ballet Philippines")		Philippines	Aired via live streaming through Zoom, Facebook and YouTube	
2022	July 15	TUGATOG: The Filipino Music Festival 2022	Pasay	Philippines	Mall of Asia Arena and simulcast via live streaming	
2022	July 22	BE YOU: The World will Adjust Benefit Concert (Note: "with Red Velvet, BINI and Lady Pipay")	Pasay	Philippines	Mall of Asia Arena	
2022	July 23	Star Magic 30th Anniversary Tour: Beyond The Stars (Note: "with other Star Magic Artists, BGYO and Shanaia Gomez weren't able to join the US leg of the tour")	Pasay	Philippines	Newport Performing Arts Theater in Resorts World Manila	
2022	August 12	Star Magic 30th Anniversary Tour: Beyond The Stars	San Francisco, California	United States of America	The Warfield Theatre	
2022	August 14	Star Magic 30th Anniversary Tour: Beyond The Stars	Los Angeles, California	United States of America	The Saban Theatre	
2022	August 27	HIH All Access: The He's Into Her Grand Finale Concert (Note: "with He's Into Her All Casts and other guests performers BINI, Sab, Trisha Denise, Jon Guelas, Zion Aguirre and The Nameless Kids")	Quezon City	Philippines	Smart Araneta Coliseum	
2022	September 2	Kumu is 4 U: A Birthday Concert (Note: "Alongside other P-pop groups and Kumu Streamers.")	Taguig	Philippines	Samsung Hall – SM Aura Premier	
2022	October 9	EK’s 27th Pre-Anniversary Concert:P-pop Day (Note: "Alongside other P-pop groups-Alamat, 1st.One, Dione and SMS")	Laguna	Philippines	Spaceport, Enchanted Kingdom	
2022	October 15	Mr. Music: The Hits of Jonathan Manalo (Note: "The concert is the 20th anniversary of Jonathan Manalo in the Philippine music industry with over 30 artists performing.")	Pasay	Philippines	Newport Performing Arts Theater	
2022	October 29	HALLYUWEEN 2022 (Note: "Philippines' first ever K-pop Halloween Party concert alongside 6 K-Pop artists—CL, Epik High, KARD, Pentagon, Gaho x KAVE and DJ Soda.") (Note: "The group performed The Light, The Baddest, Kundiman and Magnet in the event.")	Pasay	Philippines	Mall of Asia Arena	
2022	November 5	ASAP Natin 'To Las Vegas (Note: "with ASAP Natin 'To artists: Gary Valenciano, Martin Nievera, Ogie Alcasid, Zsa Zsa Padilla, Regine Velasquez-Alcasid, KZ Tandingan, Kim Chiu, Darren Espanto, Iñigo Pascual, BINI, AC Bonifacio, Kyle Echarri, Donny Pangilinan, Belle Mariano, Bamboo, Ez Mil, Lovi Poe, Jane De Leon, Janella Salvador, Vaughn Mugol, Jessica Sanchez, Francisco Martin, Cheesa Laureta, Elha Nympha, Dessa, Rizza Navales, Brian Puspos and Bailey May.")	Las Vegas, Nevada	United States of America	Orleans Arena	
2022	November 30	Wish Upon A Sun (Note: "A free concert presented by Sun Life Philippines in partnership with Wish 107.5 for the campaign "Sun Life's Partner for Life" with Johnoy Danao and Janine Teñoso.")	Quezon City	Philippines	Eton Centris Open Grounds	
2022	December 2	Kapaskuhan sa Makabagong San Juan: Free Concert (Note: "A free concert with Juan Karlos Labajo, 8Track, Dustine Mayores, and Amanda Zamora.")	San Juan City	Philippines	Pinaglabanan Shrine open parking grounds	
2022	December 10	Xiaomi Pop PH 2022: A Merry Xiaomi Christmas! (Note: "A free concert presented by Xiaomi Philippines with Darren Espanto and Moira Dela Torre.")	Taguig City (Across the Bonifacio High Street Xiaomi Store)	Philippines	Xiaomi Pop Venue BHS Amphitheater, Bonifacio Global City	
2022	December 11	Spotify Wrapped 2022: Playground (Note: "A two-part concert presented by Spotify Philippines with BINI on 10th of December.")	Pasay City	Philippines	SM Mall Of Asia Music Hall	

== Showcases ==
Year	Date	Title	Performed song(s)	City	Country	Venue	Ref.
2020	August 22 & 29	Happy Hallyu Day 4	"Let Me Hear You Say" (Seventeen) "Tempo" (Exo) "On" (BTS) "Raise Your Flag" (KZ Tandingan and Kritiko)	Manila	Philippines	Virtual	
2020	October 31	2020 Philippines-Korea Cultural Exchange Festival	"Cherry Bomb" (NCT 127) "Mic Drop" (BTS) "Sing For You" (Exo)	Manila	Philippines	Virtual	
2021	August 28–29	Happy Hallyu Day 5: A Virtual Fest	"My House" (2PM) "Hard Carry" (GOT7) "Boy" (Treasure) "The Baddest"	Manila	Philippines	Virtual	

== Street performances ==
Year	Date	Title	Performed song(s)	City	Country	Venue	Ref.
2022	November 19	BGYO and Bini Busking in New York City	"Magnet" "PNGNP" "Be Us"	New York City	United States of America	Time Square and Union Square	

== Performances on award shows and specials ==
Year	Date	Title	Performed song(s)	Country	Ref.
2019	August 3	Pinoy Big Brother: Otso	"Bituin" (Maymay Entrata)	Philippines	
2019	—N/a	"2019 Southeast Asian Games Thanksgiving Celebration"	—N/a	Philippines	
2019	November 16	"FitFil Youth Against Drugs and Obesity"	—N/a	Philippines	
2020	December 20	ABS-CBN Christmas Special 2020	Pre-show: "Raise Your Flag" (KZ Tandingan and Kritiko) "Christmas Party" "Sasamahan Kita" (Loisa Andalio) "Liwanag at Ligaya" Main Show: "Jingle Bell Rock" "Hataw Na" (Gary Valenciano)	Philippines	
2021	April 21	Wish 107.5 Bus	"The Light"	Philippines	
2021	March 14	Pinoy Big Brother: Connect @ The Big Night	"The Light" - Rock Version	Philippines	
2021	May 29	"Love Kita Pinas"	"The Light (Rock Version)"	Philippines	
2021	August 7	MYX Music Awards 2021	"He's Into Her"	Philippines	
2021	November 29	34th Awit Awards	"The Baddest"	Philippines	
2021	December 3	2021 Asian Academy Creative Awards	"He's Into Her"	Singapore	
2022	February 27	"Uplive WorldStage - Grand Finals"	"The Baddest"	United States of America	
2022	March 19	"Saludo Excellence Awards 2021"	"The Baddest"	Philippines	
2022	March 22	"Star Magic's 'Beyond the Stars' Trade Event"	"When I'm with You" "Galing Natin Ito"	Philippines	
2022	April 10	ABS-CBN and PACE Media Congress Digital Caravan	"He's Into Her"	Philippines	
2022	May 2	Simply K-Pop Con-Tour	"The Light" "Best Time"	Philippines	
2022	May 25	4th Herons Heroes Awards - University of Makati	"Best Time"	Philippines	
2022	May 28	Tarlac 149th Founding Anniversary	"He's Into Her" "Kundiman" "Best Time"	Philippines	
2022	May 29	Pinoy Big Brother: Kumunity Season 10	(PBB Theme Songs Medley) "Kabataang Pinoy" "Pinoy Ako" "Sikat Ang Pinoy"	Philippines	
2022	June 5	PBA 47th Season - Opening	"The Light"	Philippines	
2022	July 12	St. Joseph Homes for Special Children - Tarlac City (Note: "Subsidiary event of BE YOU: The World will Adjust Benefit Concert.")	"Sabay"	Philippines	
2022	September 8	Lazada 9.9 Megasale Super Show (Note: "The debut of the group in the show, with their opening and closing performances.")	"The Baddest" "Tumitigil Ang Mundo"	Philippines	
2022	September 23	PARI presents Awit Awards 2022 curated by MYX Nominee Fest (Note: "The event also features the performances from Kanishia, Nameless Kids, Ace Banzuelo and Morissette at the Venice Piazza at McKinley Hill, Taguig.")	"Best Time" "Tumitigil Ang Mundo"	Philippines	
2022	September 27	2nd Diamond Excellence Awards	"Tumitigil Ang Mundo"	Philippines	
2022	November 11	Wish USA Bus	"Be Us" "PNGNP" "Magnet"	United States of America	
2022	November 19	MYX Hits Different	"Kundiman" "Tumitigil Ang Mundo"	Philippines	
2022	December 17–18	ABS-CBN Christmas Special 2022	"Magnet" "Up!"	Philippines	

== See also ==
- 2021 in Philippine music
- 2022 in Philippine music
