= Kumu (social network) =

Filipino social network

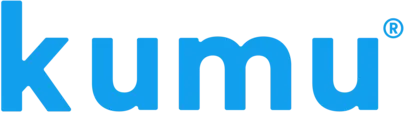
- Wordmark
- Developers: Kumumedia Technologies, Inc.
- Release: January 9, 2018; 8 years ago
- Stable release: 8.35.0 / December 14, 2022
- Operating system: iOS, Android
- Size: 177.4 MB (iOS); 62 MB (Android)
- Available in: English, Taglish
- Type: Social networking Video sharing E-commerce
- License: Proprietary software with Terms of Use
- Website: www.kumu.ph

Kumu (stylized in lowercase) is a Filipino video sharing and e-commerce social networking service owned and developed by Kumumedia Technologies, Inc. The social media platform is used to livestream curated programs created by app users and partner brands and as an e-commerce platform for app users and partner brands who want to sell their merchandise online. It was founded in 2017 and launched on Android and iOS devices in February 2018. Kumu caters mainly to the Philippine market and the Filipino diaspora. In October 2020, the app topped the download charts of both the Apple App Store and Google Play in the free apps category. The app aims to become a "super app" that combines the functionalities of other apps like YouTube, TikTok, Shopee, Instagram and Facebook Messenger into one. Kumu is considering adding offline events to its platform, such as fan meetings with popular livestreamers and a convention inspired by Comic-Con called Kumu-Con, and expand beyond livestreaming to e-commerce and payments.

== History ==
Kumu was developed in 2017 then launched in February 2018 by Roland Ros, Rexy Dorado, Andrew Pineda, and Clare Ros, who are Filipino entrepreneurs that were based in the United States and have worked in technology and social enterprises. It was initially developed as a messaging app with a livestreaming feature targeted toward millennial and Generation Z Filipino users. The app's name was derived from the Filipino word "kumusta", meaning "How are you?", which is a common greeting among Filipinos.

Kumu's livestreaming feature proved to be more popular among its users and the developers eventually shifted their focus towards this functionality and introduced other features. Registered users can also earn through brand sponsorships in their livestreams, similar to revenues that YouTube users can earn from ads on their videos. Kumu content creators can earn at least ₱20,000 (or about US$400) through livestreaming. With over 25,000 livestream broadcasts each day, Kumu has 3 million registered users each clocking an hour of daily average usage.

Aside from user created livestreams, Kumu also livestreams its own curated shows, mainly game shows such as Game Ka Na Ba? and Quiz Mo Ko. It has also partnered with various celebrities and brands to promote products through livestreaming. These include former actor and Manila Mayor Isko Moreno, journalist Ces Drilon, TV host Boy Abunda, TV executive and actress Charo Santos, Sydney Crespo, Ruby Ibarra, Mica Javier, Apple Chiu, Brent Manalo, as well as Star Magic Philippines, Cornerstone Entertainment Group, and MOR Philippines.

In December 2018, Kumu announced that it had secured around $1.2 million in seed funding, led by Summit Media, Foxmont Capital Partners, and Two Culture Capital.

With the sudden popularity of podcasting amid the COVID-19 pandemic, Kumu added a podcasting feature in February 2020 to attract more users and content creators to use to app. The feature allows audio streamers to accommodate guests and co-hosts in ‘public’ and ‘friends only’ options; as well as ‘mute’, ‘kick’ or ‘block’ listeners.

In April 2020, Kumu announced that it had secured around $5 million in Series A funding. Openspace Ventures, an early investor in Indonesian unicorn start-up Gojek, along with Kickstart Ventures, ABS-CBN, Gobi-Core Philippine Fund, and returning investors Summit Media and Foxmont Capital Partners all participated in the funding round.

In October 2020, Kumu partnered with Philippine media conglomerate ABS-CBN to launch the ninth season of reality TV show Pinoy Big Brother: Connect amid the COVID-19 pandemic. The app hosted online auditions for the reality show, which attracted over 100,000 new users, and it also livestreamed activities inside the Big Brother House during the show's run.

In June 2021, Kumu announced that it had secured an undisclosed amount in Series B funding. Gentree Fund, Endeavor Catalyst Fund, alongside returning investors Summit Media, Kickstart Ventures, Foxmont Capital Partners, and Gobi-Core Philippine Fund all participated in the funding round.

In July 2021, Kumu announced a partnership with Wattpad to bring their stories into the Kumu app via live streaming, audio streaming, and social commerce.

In August 2021, Kumu partnered again with ABS-CBN to launch the tenth season of reality TV show Pinoy Big Brother: Kumunity Season 10. The tenth season will feature adult, teen, and celebrity editions.

In October 2021, Kumu announced that it had secured an undisclosed amount in Series C funding, led by General Atlantic with the participation of Openspace Ventures and SIG. This brought Kumu's total funding to over $100 million.

In November 2021, Kumu partnered with Eat Bulaga! to launch Bida First: Isang Tawag Ka Lang!, a segment within the Eat Bulaga! program where viewers can win cash prizes by calling a phone number, in the app.

In March 2022, Kumu partnered with TV5 to launch Top Class, a talent search reality TV show focused on looking for the next Pinoy pop idol. In the same month, Kumu partnered with the Premier Volleyball League to stream their games on the Kumu app.

In September 2023, Kumu announced a partnership with Ikon Solutions to provide job opportunities for Overseas Filipino Workers.

== Features ==
- Pinoy Tambayan – An online community powered by artists, educators, and everyday Filipinos, where people from around the world can share their stories through their own livestream channels.
- Live Pinoy Games – Authentic, positive, inspirational, and fun live games that also give users a chance to win some cash and cool prizes.
- Kumunity - An online community of Filipino users where they have the freedom to talk about anything under the sun by posting on their profile or using the messenger functions, as well as share posts and videos to Facebook, Messenger, WhatsApp, Instagram, Twitter, and SMS.
- Live Commerce - The app's e-commerce feature. Kumu has partnered with various brands and Filipino talents to show off products on livestreams. The app also offers weekly discount coupons and free delivery all throughout the Philippines.
- Messenger - The app's messaging function. Users can chat with celebrities and users and create group chats.

== See also ==
- Pinoy Big Brother: Connect
- Pinoy Big Brother: Kumunity Season 10
