= Coke Studio Philippines =

- Logo of Coke Studio Philippines
- Country of origin: Philippines
- No. of seasons: 10 (list of seasons)

Production
- Production locations: Manila, Philippines
- Running time: 30 minutes (no commercial breaks)
- Production company: Coca-Cola Beverages Philippines

Original release
- Network: TV5 (Season 1); ABS-CBN (Season 2–3); Coke Studio PH Youtube Channel (Season 4–7)
- Release: July 29, 2017 – present

Coke Studio Philippines is a music franchise and live concert series in the Philippines produced by Coca-Cola Beverages Philippines. Based on the Pakistani music franchise of the same name, it debuted on July 29, 2017. Originally broadcast as a television variety show on TV5 and ABS-CBN, the franchise shifted primarily to digital content and large-scale live concert activations starting with Season 8 in 2024.

== History ==
Created by The Coca-Cola Company, the show has earlier editions in other countries in Asia like Pakistan and India. Starting with Season 8 in 2024, Coke Studio Philippines pivoted from pre-recorded studio specials to live arena experiences and interactive fan events.

== Seasons overview ==
Year	Date	Theme	Venue	Host(s)	Lineup
2017	July 29 – October	Coke Studio Taste the Feeling	TV5	Raimund Marasigan & Buddy Zabala	Noel Cabangon x Curtismith, Gabby Alipe & John Dinopol x The Ransom Collective, Ebe Dancel x Autotelic, Moonstar88 x Jensen and The Flips, Sandwich x BP Valenzuela, Abra x Gracenote, Franco x Reese Lansangan
2018	September 16 – December	Coke Studio Homecoming	ABS-CBN	Saab Magalona	IV of Spades x Shanti Dope, Quest x Juan Miguel Severo, Kriesha Chu x DJ Patty Tiu, Sam Concepcion x Ben&Ben, Moira Dela Torre x AJ Rafael, Khalil Ramos x December Avenue, apl.de.ap x KZ Tandingan
2019	September 14 – November	Coke Studio Season 3	ABS-CBN	Ylona Garcia	Iñigo Pascual x Ron Henley, Brisom x Silent Sanctuary, Morissette x St. Wolf, Clara Benin x Janine Teñoso x Bea Lorenzo, Just Hush x UDD, Lola Amour x Al James, This Band x Sarah Geronimo
2020	October – December	Coke Studio Peel Mo Ang Panalo	Coke Studio PH YouTube Channel	Sam Concepcion	Unique, December Avenue, Moira Dela Torre, Shanti Dope, KZ Tandingan, Sarah Geronimo
2021	May – August	Coke Studio Breakada	Coke Studio PH YouTube Channel	Sam Concepcion	BGYO x Keiko Necesario, Janine Teñoso x Mc Einstein, ALLMO$T x Rob Deniel, Iñigo Pascual x ALAMAT, Angela Ken x CLR, Bandang Lapis x Syd Hartha, Skusta Clee x Magnus Haven, Moira Dela Torre x The Juans
2022	July – October	Coke Studio Fan-Fusion	Coke Studio PH YouTube Channel	Ai dela Cruz	Shanti Dope x Aaron Alcoran, Arthur Nery x Sam Benwick, BINI x Ciena Operanio, Adie x Chrstn, The Juans x Claire Brent Enriquez, KZ Tandingan x Pau Dimaranan
2023	October – November	Borderless Collisions	Coke Studio PH YouTube Channel	Ai dela Cruz	Bini x Playertwo, Dilaw x Janine Berdin, Alamat x Dwta
2024	September 5	The Ultimate Fandom Concert	SM Mall of Asia Arena	AC Bonifacio & Jeremy G	NewJeans, ALAMAT x Nik Makino x Kyle Echarri x Illest Morena x Zack Tabudlo
2025	September 5	Coke Studio: Live at the Big Dome	Smart Araneta Coliseum	Cholo Dela Cruz & Candy Gamos	Lauv, Bini x Orchestra of the Filipino Youth, ALAMAT × mrld, Over October × ena mori, Dionela × Alex Bruce
2026	November 7	Dinig Ang Pinas: Sumabay Ka	SM Mall of Asia Arena	Cholo Dela Cruz & Candy Gamos	KZ Tandingan x Ben&Ben x Al James, BINI, Earl Agustin, G22
