= Jonathan Manalo production discography =

This is the original production discography of Filipino songwriter, musical arranger and record producer Jonathan Manalo.

== 2000s ==
| Year | Artist | Album | Song | Co-produced / written with | Ref |
|---|---|---|---|---|---|
| 2003 | Kyla | I Will Be There | "Always on Time" | – | |
| 2003 | Kyla | Not Your Ordinary Girl | "Buti Na Lang" | – | |
| 2003 | King | Solo | "Never Let You Go" (feat. Nina, Gloc-9, and Jonathan Manalo) | – | |
| 2004 | King | The Reason I Exist | "Muli Mong Mamahalin" | Jonathan Florido | |
| 2004 | King | The Reason I Exist | "Bakit Hanggang Ngayon" | – | |
| 2004 | Erik Santos | This Is the Moment | "Pagbigyang Muli" | – | |
| 2004 | Sheryn Regis | Come In Out of the Rain | "Shoo Bee Doo Wop" | – | |
| 2004 | Dianne dela Fuente | Krystala (Original TV Soundtrack) | "Yakap Mo" | Andrei Dionisio | |
| 2004 | Sandara Park | Sandara | "Mapapasagot Mo Kaya?" | – | |
| 2004 | Josh Santana | Josh Santana | "Nasaan Ka?" | – | |
| 2005 | Orange & Lemons | Pinoy Big Brother (Ang Soundtrack Ng Teleserye Ng Totoong Buhay) EP | "Pinoy Ako" | Clemen Castro | |
| 2006 | Kyla | Beautiful Days | "Beautiful Days" | Melanie Calumpad | |
| 2006 | Sheryn Regis | 60 Taon ng Musika at Soap Opera | "Maria Flordeluna" | Arden Cruz | |
| 2007 | Regine Velasquez | Paano Kita Iibigin (Original Motion Picture Soundtrack) | "Muling Magmahal" (with Piolo Pascual) | Cynthia Roque | |
| 2007 | Toni Gonzaga | Falling In Love | "Power of the Dream" | – | |
| 2007 | Piolo Pascual | Timeless | "Ikaw Na Nga" | – | |
| 2007 | Piolo Pascual | Timeless | "Why Can't We Be Together" | Piolo Pascual | |
| 2007 | Piolo Pascual | Timeless | "There For Me" | – | |
| 2008 | Bea Alonzo | The Real Me | "Kagandahan (Betty La Fea Theme)" | – | |
| 2008 | Various artists | Musika sa Bahay ni Kuya | "Sikat ang Pinoy" (with Toni Gonzaga and Sam Milby) | – | |
| 2008 | Various artists | Musika sa Bahay ni Kuya | "Kabataang Pinoy" (with The Itchyworms) | Jazz Nicolas | |
| 2008 | Bugoy Drilon | Paano Na Kaya? | "Bakit Ba?" | – | |
| 2009 | Jake Zyrus | My Inspiration | "Always You" | – | |
| 2009 | Erik Santos | Non-album single | "Bagong Umaga" (with Toni Gonzaga and Yeng Constantino) | – | |
| 2009 | Juris | May Bukas Pa (Conversations Of Bro & Santino) | "Nariyan Ka" | – | |

== 2010s ==
| Year | Artist | Album | Song | Co-produced / written with | Ref |
|---|---|---|---|---|---|
| 2010 | Juris | Now Playing | "Nariyan Ka" | – | |
| 2010 | Toni Gonzaga | All Me | "I Love You So" | – | |
| 2010 | Toni Gonzaga | All Me | "You Make Me Feel" | – | |
| 2010 | Toni Gonzaga | All Me | "All Me" | – | |
| 2011 | Angeline Quinto | Angeline Quinto | "Patuloy ang Pangarap" | – | |
| 2011 | Juris | Forevermore | "Kahit Di Mo Sabihin" | – | |
| 2011 | Erik Santos | Awit Para Sa'yo | "Bakit Mahal Pa Rin Kita" | – | |
| 2011 | Erik Santos | Awit Para Sa'yo | "Langit" | – | |
| 2011 | Sam Milby | Be Mine | "Hindi Kita Iiwan" | – | |
| 2013 | KZ Tandingan | KZ Tandingan | "Darating Din" | Yosha Honasan | |
| 2013 | KZ Tandingan | KZ Tandingan | "Bakit Lumuluha" | Paula Alcasid | |
| 2013 | KZ Tandingan | KZ Tandingan | "Un-Love You" | – | |
| 2013 | Jed Madela | All Original | "Wish" | Garlic Garcia | |
| 2013 | Jed Madela | All Original | "Tanging Ikaw" | Roque Santos | |
| 2013 | Vice Ganda | Vice Ganda | "Boom Panes" | Vice Ganda, Roque Santos | |
| 2014 | Toni Gonzaga | Celestine | "This Love Is Like" | Toni Gonzaga | |
| 2014 | Toni Gonzaga | Celestine | "Sweetest Song" | Christian Martinez | |
| 2014 | Gimme 5 | Gimme 5 | "Ikaw Na Na Na Na" | – | |
| 2014 | Yeng Constantino | All About Love | "So Beautiful" | – | |
| 2015 | Alex Gonzaga | I am Alex G. | "Panaginip Lang" | Michael Gabriel Tagadtad | |
| 2015 | Piolo Pascual | The Breakup Playlist | "Paano Ba ang Magmahal" (with Sarah Geronimo) | Josephine Constantino | |
| 2015 | Erik Santos | Champion Reborn | "Don't Tell Me Don't" (feat. Kyla) | – | |
| 2015 | Vice Ganda | Non-album single | "Wag Kang Pabebe" | Vice Ganda, Roque Santos | |
| 2015 | Various artists | Dreamscape Televisions of Love (Volume 1) | "Ikaw ay Ako" (with Klarisse and Morissette) | – | |
| 2015 | Kyla | My Very Best | "Tara Tena" (with Kaya and V3) (Note: Kyla, Kaya and V3 recorded "Tara Tena" as an entry for the 2001 Himig Handog sa Makabagong Kabataan songwriting competition.) | – | |
| 2016 | Ylona Garcia | My Name Is Ylona Garcia | "Stop the Bully" | Mary Jane Cruz-Mendoza, Roque Santos | |
| 2016 | Migz & Maya | Migz & Maya | "Paano Ba Ang Magmahal" | Josephine Constantino | |
| 2016 | Migz & Maya | Migz & Maya | "Para Lang Sa'yo" | – | |
| 2016 | Migz & Maya | Migz & Maya | "Baby I Do" | Rox Santos | |
| 2016 | Vina Morales | Vina Morales | "Maghihintay Kailanman" | Chie Floresca | |
| 2016 | Iñigo Pascual | Inigo Pascual | "That Hero" (feat. Kidwolf and Theo Mertel) | – | |
| 2016 | Vice Ganda | Non-album single | "Ang Kulit" | Christian Martinez | |
| 2017 | Angeline Quinto | @LoveAngelineQuinto | "Para Bang, Para Lang" | Angeline Quinto | |
| 2017 | Angeline Quinto | @LoveAngelineQuinto | "At Ang Hirap" | – | |
| 2017 | Angeline Quinto | @LoveAngelineQuinto | "Paano Ba Ang Huwag Kang Mahalin" | Darla Sauler | |
| 2017 | KZ Tandingan | Soul Supremacy | "Sa'yo" | Nur Ashriqin, Samuel Simpson | |
| 2018 | Gary Valenciano | FPJ's Ang Probinsyano: The Official Soundtrack | "Ililigtas Ka Niya" | – | |
| 2018 | Jessa Zaragoza | 20/30 | "Sa Ngalan ng Pag-ibig" | Kiko Salazar, Jerry Gracio | |
| 2018 | Kyla | The Queen of R&B | "Only Gonna Love You" (feat. REQ) | – | |
| 2018 | Kyla | The Queen of R&B | "Talk About Us" (feat. Iñigo Pascual) | Marion Aunor | |
| 2018 | Kyla | The Queen of R&B | "Fix You and Me" | Zadon | |
| 2018 | Princess Sevillena | Non-album single | "Pangarap Kong Bituin" | – | |
| 2018 | Erik Santos | 15 | "Pagbigyang Muli" (feat. Regine Velasquez) | – | |
| 2018 | Erik Santos | Non-album single | "I Will Never Leave You" (with Lani Misalucha) | – | |
| 2018 | Jericho Rosales | Non-album single | "Hardin" | Jericho Rosales | |
| 2019 | Jaya | Queen of Soul | "Hanggang Dito Na Lang" | Kiko Salazar | |
| 2019 | Jaya | Queen of Soul | "Sinking My Heart" | – | |
| 2019 | Jaya | Queen of Soul | "Won't Cry" (feat. Gloc-9) | Aristotle Pollisco, Kiko Salazar | |
| 2019 | Jaya | Queen of Soul | "You're a Liar" | – | |
| 2019 | Jaya | Queen of Soul | "Kasalanan Ko Ba" | – | |
| 2019 | Jaya | Queen of Soul | "Tanggap Ko Na" | – | |
| 2019 | Jaya | Queen of Soul | "Miracle Child" | – | |
| 2019 | Wengie | Collabs Vol. 1 (Int'l Ver.) | "Mr. Nice Guy" | Wendy Ayche, Jackie Miskanic, Klara Eliasdottir, Melanie Fontana, Michel Schulz | |
| 2019 | JM de Guzman | Non-album single | "Huling Liham" | Kiko Salazar | |
| 2019 | Zephanie Dimaranan | Idol Philippines (Originals) | "Pangarap Kong Pangarap Mo" | – | |
| 2019 | Zephanie Dimaranan | Non-album single | "Bawat Daan" (Note: Official soundtrack for the TV series The Killer Bride) | – | |
| 2019 | TNT All-Stars | Non-album single | "Pabuhat" | Tito Cayamanda, Yael Yuzon, Yumi Lacsamana | |
| 2019 | Moira Dela Torre | Non-album single | "Unbreakable" (with Regine Velasquez) | Trisha Denise Campañer | |
| 2019 | Vice Ganda | The Mall, The Merrier Official Soundtrack | "Kay Sayang Pasko Na Naman" (with Anne Curtis and Kritiko) | – | |

== 2020s ==
| Year | Artist | Album | Song | Co-produced / written with | Ref |
|---|---|---|---|---|---|
| 2020 | Various artists | Non-album single | "Ililigtas Ka Niya" | – | |
| 2020 | Lesha | Non-album single | "Ciao, Bella" | Lesha | |
| 2020 | Kim Chiu | Non-album single | "Bawal Lumabas (The Classroom Song)" | Kim Chiu, Squammy Beats, Adrian Crisanto | |
| 2020 | Aegis | Non-album single | "Ang Sa Iyo Ay Akin" | Bernadette Sembrano | |
| 2020 | Anthony Rosaldo | Non-album single | "Pwedeng Tayo" | Davey Langit, Edwin Marollano, Albert Tamayo and Vehnee Saturno | |
| 2020 | Ja Mill | Non-album single | "Tayo Hanggang Dulo" | Michael "Cursebox" Negapatan, Perry Lansingan | |
| 2020 | Zephanie Dimaranan | Non-album single | "Sabihin Mo Na Lang Kasi" | – | |
| 2020 | Jake Zyrus | Non-album single | "Missing You in the Moonlight" | – | |
| 2020 | Moira Dela Torre | Patawad (Deluxe Edition) | "Ikaw Pa Rin" | Moira Dela Torre | |
| 2020 | Moira Dela Torre | Patawad (Deluxe Edition) | "Patawad, Paalam" (with I Belong to the Zoo) | Moira Dela Torre | |
| 2020 | Moira Dela Torre | Patawad (Deluxe Edition) | "Patawad" | – | |
| 2020 | Moira Dela Torre | Patawad (Deluxe Edition) | "Hanggang Sa Huli (from "24/7")" | Trisha Denise Campañer | |
| 2020 | Moira Dela Torre | Patawad (Deluxe Edition) | "Paubaya" | James Narvaez, Chris Ian Rosales, Luke Sigua | |
| 2020 | Various artists | Non-album single | "Heal" | Alex Godinez, Christopher James Moore Lopez | |
| 2020 | Agsunta | Non-album single | "Kahit Kunwari Man Lang" (with Moira Dela Torre) | – | |
| 2020 | Bernadette Sembrano | Non-album single | "Yakapin Ang Pasko" | – | |
| 2021 | Regine Velasquez | Non-album single | "Hoy, Love You" (with Ogie Alcasid) | Ogie Alcasid | |
| 2021 | Alex Gonzaga | Non-album single | WKT (feat. Arvey) | Alex Gonzaga, Arvey, Michael "Cursebox" Negapatan | |
| 2021 | Jayda Avanzado | Non-album single | "Paano Kung Naging Tayo" | Jayda Avanzado | |
| 2021 | Jona | Non-album single | "Init sa Magdamag" | – | |
| 2021 | Dan Ombao | Non-album single | "Saranggola" | Dan Ombao | |
| 2021 | Bernadette Sembrano | Non-album single | "Yakap" | – | |
| 2021 | Various artists | OPM Fresh: Songwriters Series, Vol. 1 - EP | "Mahiwaga" | – | |
| 2021 | Various artists | OPM Fresh: Songwriters Series, Vol. 1 - EP | "Kaya Pala" | – | |
| 2021 | Various artists | OPM Fresh: Songwriters Series, Vol. 1 - EP | "Sleep Tonight" | – | |
| 2021 | Various artists | OPM Fresh: Songwriters Series, Vol. 1 - EP | "Ikaw Na Lang Ang Kulang" | – | |
| 2021 | Various artists | OPM Fresh: Songwriters Series, Vol. 1 - EP | "Stop Missing You" | – | |
| 2021 | Trisha Denise | Piece of the Puzzle | "Mahalin" | – | |
| 2021 | Trisha Denise | Piece of the Puzzle | "Puwede Ba?" (feat. Arvey) | – | |
| 2021 | Trisha Denise | Piece of the Puzzle | "Miss na Miss" (feat. Dan Ombao) | – | |
| 2021 | Trisha Denise | Piece of the Puzzle | "Bakit Ba" | – | |
| 2021 | Trisha Denise | Piece of the Puzzle | "Alalahaning Kalimutan" | – | |
| 2021 | Trisha Denise | Piece of the Puzzle | "Strangers" | – | |
| 2021 | Trisha Denise | Piece of the Puzzle | "Ang Totoo" | – | |
| 2021 | Trisha Denise | Piece of the Puzzle | "Piece of the Puzzle" | – | |
| 2021 | Yeng Constantino | Non-album single | "Kumapit" | – | |
| 2021 | Kyle Echarri | New Views | "Panaginip" | Kyle Echarri, Rox Santos | |
| 2021 | Ron Solis | Ron Solis | "Last Love Song" | – | |
| 2021 | Ron Solis | Ron Solis | "Huwag Ka Nang Umiyak" | – | |
| 2021 | Ron Solis | Ron Solis | "Sana Naman" | – | |
| 2021 | Ron Solis | Ron Solis | "Laging Ikaw" | Rox Santos | |
| 2021 | Ron Solis | Ron Solis | "Ngayong Nandito Ka Na" | – | |
| 2021 | SAB | Sunsets and Heaven | "She" | – | |
| 2021 | SAB | Sunsets and Heaven | "Dancing in the Dark" | – | |
| 2021 | SAB | Sunsets and Heaven | "2am | – | |
| 2021 | SAB | Sunsets and Heaven | "Soft Hearts" | – | |
| 2021 | SAB | Sunsets and Heaven | "Sunsets and Heaven" | – | |
| 2021 | SAB | Sunsets and Heaven | "Always Stay the Same" | – | |
| 2021 | BGYO | He's Into Her: Original Soundtrack | "He's Into Her" | Gabriel Tagadtad | |
| 2021 | Sheryn Regis | She EP | "Gusto Ko Nang Bumitaw" | Michiko Unso, Sheryn Regis | |
| 2021 | Sheryn Regis | She EP | "Kung Puwede Lang" | – | |
| 2021 | Sheryn Regis | She EP | "Sabi Mo" | – | |
| 2021 | Sheryn Regis | She EP | "Simula ng Dulo" | – | |
| 2021 | Nameless Kids | Shoes Out the Door! EP | "Outlaws" | Nameless Kids | |
| 2021 | Nameless Kids | Shoes Out the Door! EP | "Wanna Know Me" | Nameless Kids | |
| 2021 | Nameless Kids | Shoes Out the Door! EP | "Midsummer High" | Nameless Kids | |
| 2021 | Nameless Kids | Shoes Out the Door! EP | "Habits" | Nameless Kids | |
| 2021 | Nameless Kids | Shoes Out the Door! EP | "Til Love Means Love" | Nameless Kids | |
| 2021 | Nameless Kids | Shoes Out the Door! EP | "Faded" | Nameless Kids | |
| 2021 | Lian Kyla | Non-album single | "Saya" | – | |
| 2021 | BGYO | The Light | "When I'm With You" | – | |
| 2021 | BGYO | The Light | "Fly Away" | – | |
| 2021 | BGYO | The Light | "Rocketman" | Lian Kyle, Ainna Antiporda | |
| 2021 | BGYO | The Light | "Sabay" | – | |
| 2021 | BGYO | The Light | "Kundiman" | – | |
| 2021 | BINI | Born to Win | "Born to Win" | – | |
| 2021 | BINI | Born to Win | "Golden Arrow" | Sabine Cerrado, Maraiah Queen Arceta, Mikhaela Janna Lim, Stacey Aubrey Sevilleja, Ma. Nicolette Vergara | |
| 2021 | BINI | Born to Win | "B Hu U R" (featuring Kritiko) | Herbs Samonte, Kritiko | |
| 2021 | BINI | Born to Win | "Kinikilig" | Rox Santos, Rico Gonzales, Trisha Denise, Nicolette Vergara, Mary Loi Yves Ricalde | |
| 2021 | BINI | Born to Win | "Kapit Lang" | Maraiah Queen Arceta, Mikhaela Janna Lim, Stacey Aubrey Sevilleja, Ma. Nicolette Vergara, Mary Loi Yves Ricalde | |
| 2021 | Tim Pavino | Non-album single | "We Were 16" | Tim Pavino | |
| 2021 | Antenorcruz | Non-album single | "Pagbigyang Muli" | – | |
| 2021 | Anji Salvacion | My Sunset Girl (Original Soundtrack) | "Don't Be Afraid" | Angela Ken Rojas | |
| 2021 | Claudine Co | Non-album single | "Patay Sindi" | – | |
| 2021 | FANA | Non-album single | "Yakapin ang Pag-asa ng Pasko" (with Jeremy G) | – | |
| 2021 | Alyssa Quijano | Non-album single | "Maari B" | – | |
| 2022 | Zephanie Dimaranan | Zephanie | "Pag-Ibig Na Kaya" (with Jeremy G) | – | |
| 2022 | Markus Paterson | Non-album single | "Speed of Love" (with Gigi de Lana & Kaori Oinuma) | Trisha Denise | |
| 2022 | The CompanY | Non-album single | "Sa May Bintana" | Moy Ortiz | |
| 2022 | Lian Kyla | Unang Hakbang | "Saya" | – | |
| 2022 | Lian Kyla | Unang Hakbang | "Waiting" | – | |
| 2022 | Lian Kyla | Unang Hakbang | "Verified" | – | |
| 2022 | Lian Kyla | Unang Hakbang | "Unang Hakbang" | – | |
| 2022 | Lian Kyla | Unang Hakbang | "Yun Ka" | – | |
| 2022 | Lian Kyla | Unang Hakbang | "Walang Hanggang Paalam" | – | |
| 2022 | SB19 | Non-album single | "Kabataang Pinoy" (with BINI) | Jazz Nicolas | |
| 2022 | BINI | Non-album single | "Up!" | Angela Ken Rojas, Sabine Cerrado, Lian Kyla, Trisha Denise | |
| 2022 | KZ Tandingan | Non-album single | "Winning" | Chris "Flict" Aparri, Phillip Fender | |
| 2022 | Various artists | How to Move On In 30 Days (Original Soundtrack) | "Your Everything" | – | |
| 2022 | Various artists | How to Move On In 30 Days (Original Soundtrack) | "Hanggang Sa Muli" | – | |
| 2022 | Klarisse | Non-album single | "Thank You" | – | |
| 2022 | Angeline Quinto | Non-album single | "Nag-iisa Lang" | Robert Labayen | |
| 2022 | Janine Berdin | WTF I Actually Wrote These Songs - EP | "The Side Character" | Raven Carlisle Tabanera | |
| 2022 | Janine Berdin | WTF I Actually Wrote These Songs - EP | "Araw-araw, ikaw" | – | |
| 2022 | Janine Berdin | WTF I Actually Wrote These Songs - EP | "I'm Not Her" | Janine Berdin | |
| 2022 | Janine Berdin | WTF I Actually Wrote These Songs - EP | "Pagod Na Ako" | JKL | |
| 2022 | Janine Berdin | WTF I Actually Wrote These Songs - EP | "Padayon Lang" | Janine Berdin | |
| 2022 | Janine Berdin | WTF I Actually Wrote These Songs - EP | "She Was Only 16" | – | |
| 2022 | Moira Dela Torre | Non-album single | "Dito Ka Lang (In My Heart Filipino Version)" | Trisha Denise Campañer | |
| 2022 | BGYO | Non-album single | "Patuloy Lang ang Lipad" | Angela Ken Rojas, Sabine Cerrado, Lian Kyla, Trisha Denise | |
| 2022 | BINI | Feel Good | "Lagi" | Theo Mertel, Jeremy Glinoga | |
| 2022 | BINI | Feel Good | "Huwag Muna Tayong Umuwi" | Nica del Rosario, FlipMusic | |
| 2022 | BINI | Feel Good | "Strings" | Bini, Robert Pereña, Anna Graham, Theo Mertel, Jeremy Glinoga | |
| 2022 | Various artists | Idol Philippines Season 2 Originals | "My Time" (with Khimo) | – | |
| 2022 | Various artists | Idol Philippines Season 2 Originals | "Sa Wakas" (with Bryan Chong) | – | |
| 2022 | Various artists | Idol Philippines Season 2 Originals | "Totoo 'Na To" (with Ryssi Avila) | – | |
| 2022 | Various artists | Idol Philippines Season 2 Originals | "Ang Pinakaiibigin" (with Delly Cuales) | – | |
| 2022 | Various artists | Idol Philippines Season 2 Originals | "Angels" (with Kice) | – | |
| 2022 | Various artists | Idol Philippines Season 2 Originals | "The Power" (with Ann Raniel) | – | |
| 2022 | Trisha Denise | Non-album single | "Cracks" | Trisha Denise, Dennis Campañer | |
| 2022 | The Juans | Non-album single | "Tara, G!" | The Juans | |
| 2022 | Kyla | Non-album single | "COY (Coz of You)" (with Brian McKnight Jr.) | Brian McKnight Jr., Theo Martel | |
| 2022 | BGYO | Be Us | "Game On" | – | |
| 2022 | Angela Ken | Angela Ken | "Ako Naman Muna" | – | |
| 2022 | Angela Ken | Angela Ken | "Dagdag na Alaala" | Angela Ken Rojas | |
| 2022 | Angela Ken | Angela Ken | "It's Okay Not to Be Okay" | Angela Ken Rojas, Boy Abunda | |
| 2022 | Angela Ken | Angela Ken | "Kontrol" | – | |
| 2022 | Angela Ken | Angela Ken | "Akala Maling Akala" | – | |
| 2022 | Angela Ken | Angela Ken | "Buti Pa Noon" | – | |
| 2022 | Angela Ken | Angela Ken | "Payapa Lang" | – | |
| 2022 | Angela Ken | Angela Ken | "Sila Pa Rin" | – | |
| 2022 | ABS-CBN Music All-Stars | Non-album single | "Tayo ang Ligaya ng Isa't Isa" | Robert Labayen | |
| 2022 | Khimo Gumatay | Non-album single | "Sino Ka Ba?" | Rox Santos, Jeremy Glinoga | |
| 2022 | Ogie Alcasid | Non-album single | "Maligaya ang Pasko" | Ogie Alcasid | |
| 2023 | Maymay Entrata | Non-album single | "AUTODEADMA" | EJ Bolano, Loriebelle Aira Darunday, Justin Catalan, Rox Santos, WOOSEOK | |
| 2023 | Vice Ganda | Non-album single | "Rampa" | Vice Ganda, EJ Bolano, Loriebelle Aira Darunday, Justin Catalan, Rox Santos | |
| 2023 | Angeline Quinto | Non-album single | "Miss Manila" | EJ Bolano, Loriebelle Aira Darunday, Justin Catalan, Rox Santos | |
| 2023 | Angela Ken | Non-album single | "Dambana" | – | |
| 2023 | Moira Dela Torre | Non-album single | "Hilom" (Note: Official soundtrack for the TV series Unbreak My Heart) | Moira Dela Torre, Jeremy Glinoga, Rox Santos, Trisha Denise | |
| 2023 | Lyka Estrella | Non-album single | "Hawak Mo" | – | |
| 2023 | Kim Chiu | Fit Check: Confessions of an Ukay Queen | "Ms. Ukay" | Jeremy Glinoga, Rox Santos | |
| 2023 | Erik Santos | Non-album single | "Kasunod" | – | |
| 2023 | Jed Madela | Non-album single | "Simulan" | Edmund Perlas, Rox Santos | |
| 2023 | Angeline Quinto | Non-album single | "Kumikinang" | Rox Santos, Kiko Salazar | |
| 2023 | Jeremy Glinoga | Late Night Madness | "Dance Baby" | Jeremy Glinoga, Rox Santos | |
| 2023 | Jeremy Glinoga | Late Night Madness | "BINI" | Jeremy Glinoga, Rox Santos | |
| 2023 | Jeremy Glinoga | Late Night Madness | "OCD" (feat. day one) | Nhiko Sabiniano, Kiko Salazar | |
| 2023 | Jeremy Glinoga | Late Night Madness | "Pabalik" | – | |
| 2023 | Jeremy Glinoga | Late Night Madness | "Di Na Tayo Ganun" | – | |
| 2023 | Jeremy Glinoga | Late Night Madness | "Wag Mong Sabihin" | Jeremy Glinoga | |
| 2023 | Jeremy Glinoga | Late Night Madness | "Sinayang Mo" | Jeremy Glinoga, Rox Santos | |
| 2023 | Akira Morishita | Be Mine - Single | "Be Mine" (with JL Toreliza) | Jeremy Glinoga | |
| 2023 | LA Santos | Non-album single | "Patawad Inay" | FM Reyes, LA Santos | |
| 2023 | Janah Zaplan | Non-album single | "Pasko'y Nagbabalik" | – | |
| 2023 | ABS-CBN Music All Stars | Non-album single | "Pasko ang Pinakamagandang Kwento" | Robert Labayen, Kiko Salazar | |
| 2024 | Belle Mariano | And Solemn - EP | "Autumn" (with Ben&Ben) | Paolo Guico, Miguel Guico, Jean-Paul Verona | |
| 2024 | Ronnie Liang | Non-album single | "Para Lang Sa'yo" | – | |
| 2024 | Angeline Quinto | Non-album single | "Salamat Ika'y Dumating" | Angeline Quinto | |
| 2024 | Claudine Co | Non-album single | "Paano Kung Tayo" | – | |
| 2024 | Erik Santos | Non-album single | "Sagot Sa Aking Dasal" | – | |
| 2024 | Vice Ganda | Non-album single | "Bwak, Bwak, Bwak!" | Michael "Cursebox" Negapatan, Rox Santos | |
| 2024 | Regine Velasquez | Non-album single | "Ulit-Ulit" | – | |
| 2024 | Various artists | High Street (Original Soundtrack | "Kalma Kahit Magulo" | Icidor Kobe So, Rob Blackburn, Rox Santos | |
| 2024 | Various artists | High Street (Original Soundtrack | "Aking Anghel" | Jeremy Glinoga, Zephanie Dimaranan, Rox Santos | |
| 2024 | Wrive | Non-album single | "Color Clash" | – | |
| 2024 | BINI | Non-album single | "Blooming" | Robert Pereña | |
| 2024 | Ice Seguerra | Non-album single | "ATM" | – | |
| 2024 | Jolianne | Non-album single | "Dili na Lang" | Luke April | |
| 2024 | Maki | Non-album single | "Kurba" | Nhiko Sabiniano, Alvin Serito | |
| 2024 | Moira Dela Torre | Non-album single | "Papahiram" (feat. Johnoy Danao) | – | |
| 2024 | Alexa Ilacad | Non-album single | "Kung Naging Tayo" | – | |
| 2024 | Erik Santos | Non-album single | "The Heaven" | S.J. Gandia | |
| 2024 | Jeremy Glinoga | Late Night (More) Madness | "Moonlight Kisses" (ft. Regine Velasquez) | Jeremy Glinoga, Kiko Salazar | |
| 2024 | KZ Tandingan | Non-album single | "Toyo" | KZ Tandingan | |
| 2024 | Moira Dela Torre | I'm Okay | "Dinggin" | Casey Lagos, Migz Haleco, Jess Fermino, Elisn Idioma, Rondinelli Antimony Mazan | |
| 2025 | Nico Crisostomo | Non-album single | "Dahan-dahan" | Dan Simon | |
| 2025 | Jarren | JARREN | "Gimme, Gimme, Gimme" | Rox Santos | |
| 2025 | Lyka Estrella | Non-album single | "Hayy Langga" | Lyka Estrella | |
| 2025 | Michelle Dee | Non-album single | "REYNA" | Rox Santos | |
| 2025 | Ogie Alcasid | Non-album single | "Hanggang Dito Na Lang Ba Tayo?" | Ogie Alcasid | |
| 2025 | Zsa Zsa Padilla | 'Pag Tinadhana | "'Pag Tinadhana" | – | |
| 2025 | Zsa Zsa Padilla | 'Pag Tinadhana | "Kabiyak" | – | |
| 2025 | Zsa Zsa Padilla | 'Pag Tinadhana | "Never Be Alone" (ft. Zia Quizon) | – | |
| 2025 | Zsa Zsa Padilla | 'Pag Tinadhana | "Hinihiling" | – | |
| 2025 | Zsa Zsa Padilla | 'Pag Tinadhana | "Memoryado" | – | |
| 2025 | Zsa Zsa Padilla | 'Pag Tinadhana | "Bakit Ba" | – | |
| 2025 | Zsa Zsa Padilla | 'Pag Tinadhana | "Ingat Ka, Mahal Kita" | Rox Santos | |
| 2025 | Darren Espanto | Ikaw Pa Rin | "Bibitaw Na" | – | |
| 2025 | Darren Espanto | Ikaw Pa Rin | "Hanggang Kailan" | – | |
| 2025 | Darren Espanto | Ikaw Pa Rin | "Paano Kung Tayo Na Lang?" | – | |
| 2025 | Darren Espanto | Ikaw Pa Rin | "Dati" (feat. Belle Mariano) | – | |
| 2025 | Darren Espanto | Ikaw Pa Rin | "Ilang Beses" | – | |
| 2025 | Darren Espanto | Ikaw Pa Rin | "Iyo" | – | |
| 2025 | Darren Espanto | Ikaw Pa Rin | "Miss" | – | |
| 2025 | Darren Espanto | Ikaw Pa Rin | "Paalam Muna Sandali" | – | |
| 2025 | Christophe Sommereux | Christophe Sommereux | "Sira" | Rox Santos | |
| 2025 | Christophe Sommereux | Christophe Sommereux | "Take Care" | Rox Santos | |
| 2025 | Marko Rudio | Non-album single | "Pag-asa Kada Bukas" | – | |
| 2025 | Khimo Gumatay | Non-album single | "Ghostwriter" | Kiko Salazar | |
| 2025 | David Young | Non-album single | "Tender Lady" | David Young | |
| 2025 | Kapamilya All-Stars | Non-album single | "Kapamilya Forever" | – | |
| 2025 | Erik Santos | Non-album single | "Ipinangako" | – | |
| 2025 | Ice Seguerra | Being Ice | "Shelter of the Broken" | Ice Seguerra, Liza Diño-Seguerra, Mike Villegas | |
| 2025 | Ice Seguerra | Being Ice | "'Wag Na Lang Pala" | Ice Seguerra, Liza Diño-Seguerra, Mike Villegas | |
| 2025 | Ice Seguerra | Being Ice | "Ikaw Lang" | Ice Seguerra, Liza Diño-Seguerra, Mike Villegas | |
| 2025 | Ice Seguerra | Being Ice | "Nandiyan Ka" | Ice Seguerra, Liza Diño-Seguerra, Mike Villegas | |
| 2025 | Ice Seguerra | Being Ice | "Anino" | Ice Seguerra, Liza Diño-Seguerra, Mike Villegas | |
| 2025 | Ice Seguerra | Being Ice | "Lost in Time" | Ice Seguerra, Liza Diño-Seguerra, Mike Villegas | |
| 2025 | Ice Seguerra | Being Ice | "Natapos ang Lahat" | Ice Seguerra, Liza Diño-Seguerra, Mike Villegas | |
| 2025 | Ice Seguerra | Being Ice | "Ikaw Pala 'Yon" | Ice Seguerra, Liza Diño-Seguerra, Mike Villegas | |
| 2025 | Mika Salamanca | Non-album single | "Sino Nga Ba Siya?" | – | |
| 2025 | Ogie Alcasid | Non-album single | "IN LAB" | Ogie Alcasid | |
| 2025 | Klarisse de Guzman | Non-album single | "Dito Ka Lang, Wag Kang Lalayo" | – | |
| 2025 | FANA | Non-album single | "Meron Pero Wala" (feat. ACE$) | Kiko Salazar, Ismael "ACE$" Alshdefat | |
| 2025 | Mika Salamanca | Non-album single | "What If Tayo" (with Brent Manalo) | – | |
| 2025 | Kyla | Next Episode | "Stand Up" | Jeremy Glinoga, Rox Santos, Khimo Gumatay | |
| 2025 | Kyla | Next Episode | "Bring Your Jacket" | – | |
| 2025 | Kyla | Next Episode | "Kaya Ko Yan" (feat. ACE$) | – | |
| 2025 | Kyla | Next Episode | "SANDAANDALI" | – | |
| 2025 | Kyla | Next Episode | "Totoo Na" | – | |
| 2025 | Kyla | Next Episode | "Konti Na Lang" | – | |
| 2025 | Kyla | Next Episode | "Trust Issues" | – | |
| 2025 | Kyla | Next Episode | "Litong-lito" | – | |
| 2025 | Kyla | Next Episode | "Next Episode" | – | |
| 2025 | Kyla | Next Episode | "Back to Bliss" | Kyla | |
| 2025 | Bini | Flames | "Paru-Paro" | Danna Balagtas, Jhoanna Robles, Mikha Lim, Stacey Sevilleja | |
| 2025 | Maki | Love You So Bad (Original Soundtrack) | "Sikulo" (with Angela Ken & Nhiko) | Angela Ken Rojas, Ralph William Datoon, Nhiko Sabiniano | |
