= Bini discography =

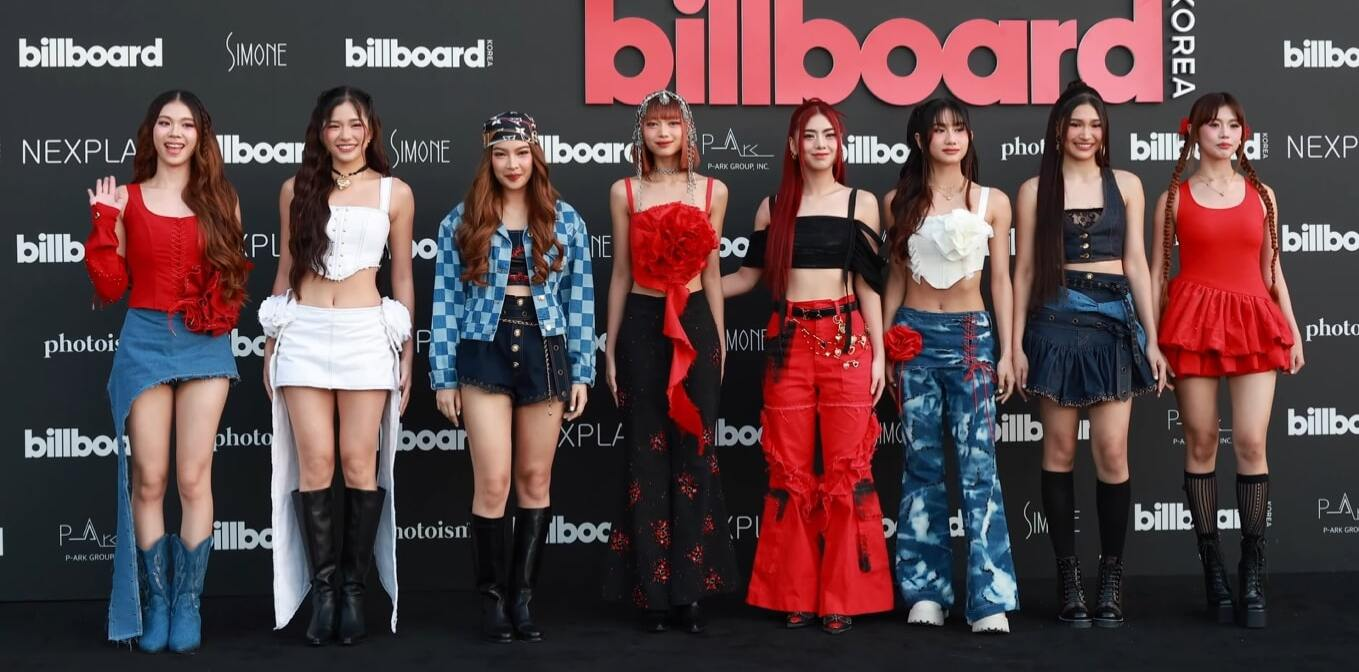
- Bini at Billboard K-Power 100 2024
- Studio albums: 3
- EPs: 3
- Singles: 25
- Promotional singles: 9
- Soundtrack appearances: 6

The Filipino girl group Bini has released three studio albums, three extended plays (EP), twenty five singles, and nine promotional singles, with six of their songs appeared on soundtracks. With over 100 million streams of their song "Pantropiko" and over six million monthly listeners on Spotify, Bini became the most streamed female OPM artist and P-pop group on the platform.

Bini was formed through the Star Hunt Academy (Note: Star Hunt Academy is a training program established by ABS-CBN in 2019 to develop young performers for the entertainment industry. It provided training for skills such as singing and dancing.) program in 2018, where its members were selected from a pool of auditionees who underwent intensive training from 2019 to 2020. Their career began with the release of their pre-debut single, "Da Coconut Nut", on November 4, 2020, an electropop remake of the same song by Ryan Cayabyab. It was met with positive reception after the group performed the song on the noontime variety show It's Showtime. On December 4, 2020, the group signed a contract with ABS-CBN's talent agency, Star Magic, and music label, Star Music.

Bini officially debuted in June 2021 the release of their debut single, "Born to Win", with their debut album of the same name released on October 15, 2021. On July 22, 2022, Bini collaborated with Coca-Cola for the sixth season of Coke Studio Philippines. The group co-wrote the single "Love Yourself" with a fan, which was released on September 7. In September 2022, the group released their comeback second album, Feel Good. The album marked the beginning of their bubblegum pop sound, which they pursued in their later releases.

In late 2023, Bini released the singles "Karera" (lit. 'Race') and "Pantropiko" (lit. 'Tropical') as promotional songs for their EP, Talaarawan (lit. 'Diary'). The songs became hits in 2024, with "Karera" becoming popular among school graduation ceremonies, and "Pantropiko" leading to dance challenges participated in by 100 million users on the social platform, TikTok. The group also collaborated with the hip-hop group PlayerTwo in October 2023 for the seventh season of Coke Studio Philippines. They performed together a reimagined rendition of the song "Bata, Kaya Mo!" (lit. 'You Can Do It, Kid!'). It was later released as a single on January 26, 2024.

On March 8, 2024, the group released its debut EP along with its lead single, "Salamin, Salamin" (lit. 'Mirror, Mirror'). The lead single, along with the previous single "Pantropiko" topped the Billboard Philippines charts in April 2024, making them the first P-pop group to top the magazine's chart. Following the EP's release, Bini released their single, "Cherry on Top", on July 11, 2024. It was produced during a writer's camp in 2023 with Shintaro Yasuda, Skylar Mones, Boy Matthews, Gaby Ramirez, and Bini members Colet and Maloi. A remix version of the song was released on October 3, 2024, as a collaboration between the group and Indonesian singer Agnez Mo. On October 31, 2024, Backspacer Records announced that Bini's albums Born to Win and Feel Good and their debut EP, Talaarawan, would be released as vinyl records in December 2024 as part of their collaboration with Star Music. In February 2025, the group released their single "Blink Twice" and teased their second EP Biniverse, which was released on February 27.

== Studio albums ==
List of studio albums, with sales figures, and certifications
Title	Album details	Sales	Certifications	Ref.
Born to Win	Released: October 14, 2021; Label: Star Music; Formats: 12" single, CD, digital download, streaming	—	—	
Feel Good	Released: September 29, 2022; Label: Star Music; Formats: 12" single, CD, digital download, streaming	PHL: 7,500 (Note: Album sales are based on PARI certification and equivalent units.)	PARI: Gold	
Flames	Released: November 20, 2025; Label: Star Music; Formats: 12" single, CD, digital download, streaming			

== Extended plays ==
List of extended plays, with sales figures, and certifications
Title	Details	Peak chart positions	Sales	Certifications	Ref.
Title	Details	UK Dig.	Sales	Certifications	Ref.
Talaarawan	Released: March 8, 2024; Label: Star Music; Formats: 12" single, CD, digital download, streaming	—	PHL: 15,000	PARI: Platinum	
Biniverse	Released: February 27, 2025; Label: Star Music; Formats: CD, digital download, streaming	20	—	—	
Signals	Released: April 9, 2026; Label: Star Music; Formats: Digital download, streaming	—	—	—	

== Singles ==
=== As lead artist ===
List of singles, showing selected chart positions, and associated albums
Title	Year	Peak chart positions					Album	Ref.
Title	Year	IFPI PHL	BB PHL	PHL Top (Note: The Billboard Philippines Top Philippine Songs chart was first introduced in July 2024 as a replacement for the discontinued Philippines Songs chart by Billboard.)	NZ Hot	UK Sales	Album	Ref.
"Da Coconut Nut"	2020	x	—	—	—	—	Non-album single	
"Born to Win"	2021	x	—	—	—	—	Born to Win	
"Kapit Lang"	2021	x	—	—	—	—	Born to Win	
"Golden Arrow"	2021	x	—	—	—	—	Born to Win	
"Na Na Na"	2021	x	17	11	—	—	Born to Win	
"Pit a Pat"	2022	x	—	—	—	—	Non-album singles	
"Love Yourself"	2022	x	—	—	—	—	Non-album singles	
"Lagi"	2022	x	9	5	—	—	Feel Good	
"I Feel Good"	2022	x	63	—	—	—	Feel Good	
"Karera"	2023	x	7	4	—	—	Talaarawan	
"Pantropiko"	2023	x	4	3	—	—	Talaarawan	
"Bata, Kaya Mo!" (with PlayerTwo)	2023	x	—	—	—	—	Non-album single	
"Salamin, Salamin"	2024	x	2	2	—	—	Talaarawan	
"Cherry on Top" (original or remix with Agnez Mo)	2024	x	6	4	—	—	Biniverse	
"Blooming"	2024	x	—	—	—	—	Non-album singles	
"Joy to the World"	2024	x	—	—	—	—	Non-album singles	
"Our Stories Shine This Christmas"	2024	x	—	—	—	—	Non-album singles	
"Blink Twice" (original, remix with Belinda, or the Taglish version)	2025	7	7	4	24	31	Biniverse	
"Oxygen" (with Orchestra of the Filipino Youth)	2025	—	—	—	—	—	Non-album single	
"Shagidi"	2025	—	—	—	—	73	Flames	
"First Luv"	2025	—	73	—	—	—	Flames	
"Paruparo"	2025	—	—	—	—	—	Flames	
"Sweet Tooth"	2025	—	—	—	—	—	Flames	
"Unang Kilig / Honey Honey"	2026	—	—	—	—	—	Signals	
"Blush"	2026	—	—	85	—	—	Signals	
"Dahil Sa'yo"	2026	—	—	—	—	—	Non-album single	
"A Parallel World"	2026	—	—	—	—	—	Forgotten Island OST	
"—" denotes a single that did not chart. "x" denotes that a chart did not exist at the time of a single's release.

=== Promotional singles ===
List of promotional singles, showing associated albums
Title	Year	Album	Ref.
"Made for All"	2022	Non-album singles	
"Super Crush"	2023	Non-album singles	
"Gandang Vitakeratin"	2024	Non-album singles	
"Hairkada, Ilugay Mo!"	2024	Non-album singles	
"Icon"	2024	Non-album singles	
"Laging Fudgee, Fudgee Lagi!"	2024	Non-album singles	
"Top"	2025	Non-album singles	
"Sama-Sama Tayo"	2026		

=== Other charted songs ===
List of other charted songs, showing selected chart positions, and associated albums
Title	Year	Peak chart positions		Album	Ref.
Title	Year	PHL	PHL Top	Album	Ref.
"Huwag Muna Tayong Umuwi"	2022	16	10	Feel Good	

=== Collaborations ===
List of collaboration singles, showing associated albums
Title	Year	Album/EP	Ref.
"B HU U R" (with Kritiko)	2021	Born to Win	
"Kabataang Pinoy" (with SB19)	2022	Non-album singles	
"Up!" (with BGYO)	2022	Non-album singles	
"Bata, Kaya Mo!" (with PlayerTwo)	2023	Non-album singles	
"Cherry on Top" (remix with Agnez Mo)	2024	Biniverse	
"Our Stories Shine This Christmas" (with various artists)	2024	Non-album single	
"Blink Twice" (remix with Belinda)	2025	Biniverse	
"Oxygen" (with Orchestra of the Filipino Youth)	2025	Non-album single	
"Love, Joy, Hope" (with various artists)	2025	Non-album single	

== Soundtrack appearances ==
List of media in which Bini's songs have been used
Year	Film/series/program	Song(s)	Ref.
2022	Pinoy Big Brother: Kumunity Season 10 – Teen Edition	"Kabataang Pinoy" (with SB19)	
2022	Labyu with an Accent	"Na Na Na"	
2022	Bini & BGYO Dubai Adventures: A Docufilm	"Up!" (with BGYO)	
2022	An Inconvenient Love	"Huwag Muna Tayong Umuwi" "Lagi"	
2023	What's Wrong with Secretary Kim	"Lagi" "Here With You" (with Gwen Apuli and Maloi Ricalde)	
2026	Forgotten Island	"A Parallel World"	
