= Moophs =

Filipino and American record producer, songwriter and DJ

- Born: Christopher Lopez; San Mateo, California
- Genres: EDM, Tropical bass, R&B, pop
- Occupations: Record producer, songwriter, DJ
- Years active: 2013–present
- Label: Tarsier

Christopher Moore Lopez, professionally known as Moophs, is a Filipino and American record producer, songwriter and DJ based in the Philippines. He founded Tarsier Records in 2017, an imprint of Star Music launched with the purpose of developing original music for international audiences.

Moophs' 2017 single "Phone Down", which featured Sam Concepcion, won Best Dance Recording at the 2018 Awit Awards. Throughout his career, he has worked with artists including Iñigo Pascual, Leila Alcasid, Marina Summers, BGYO, Bini and 1621 as a producer, songwriter or collaborator. He was part of the Recording Academy's Class of 2021.

== Background and education ==
Lopez grew up in San Mateo, California. He studied classical guitar at the San Francisco Conservatory of Music while attending high school. He went on to earn a bachelor's degree in music at the University of Southern California, where he studied classical guitar performance under Scott Tennant.

After completing his degree, Lopez worked as a bartender and as an inventory manager while performing and recording with a band. He spent a year working as a beat maker under producer Mark Feist and took on various freelance production projects before accepting an offer to work at ABS-CBN in the Philippines. He moved to Manila in 2013.

== Career ==
=== Electronic music and Tarsier Records ===
After his band in California broke up, Lopez began experimenting with electronic music. By 2017, he was Star Music's international music content officer and one of the key figures behind the newly launched Tarsier Records. The imprint focused on original music, particularly electronic music, with the aim of reaching listeners outside the Philippines. His early projects as Moophs included a remix of Sweater Beats' "Glory Days".

=== Collaborations and recording projects ===
Following their 2019 collaboration "Catching Feelings", Moophs produced Iñigo Pascual's track "Lost" in 2020. The pair wrote the song during Pascual's promotional tour in Los Angeles in 2019. Also in 2020, his collaboration with Leila Alcasid, "Clouds", appeared on Semilucent, the debut mixtape from Paradise Rising, a label established by 88rising and Globe Telecom.

In 2021, Moophs collaborated with Bugoy Drilon on "Tied", a reggae song released on January 8. He also worked with the sister duo Gibbs on "Angel Baby".

Pascual's album Options, released on June 25, 2021, included their collaborations "Lost", "Catching Feelings", "Always" and a stripped-down version of "OMW". The pair released "Araw Mo", their first Filipino-language collaboration, on July 23. Moophs also worked with Russell Reyes on his debut solo single, "Afraid".

Moophs was part of the Recording Academy's Class of 2021.

=== Production and songwriting ===
In 2022, Moophs co-wrote and produced "I'd Like To" with singer-songwriter Sabine Cerrado, known as SAB, for her first release under Tarsier Records. He produced "Hotel Room", a collaboration with Markus Paterson and Kyle Echarri. He built the instrumental around a voice recording sent by Paterson, and Echarri added a second verse. For "Ikaw Ang", a collaboration with Sam Concepcion, Yuridope and Yeng Constantino, he sampled Constantino's "Ikaw".

Later that year, Moophs produced "Create New Paths", an original song performed by Denise Julia and Kritiko for the Philippine launch of Adidas Originals' NMD_V3. The accompanying music video was unveiled at a launch event in Makati on September 30.

That year, he also produced "Pop Off Ate" for Drag Race Philippines and "Divine" by Marina Summers. Released on November 4, "Divine" was written by Summers and marked her first release under Tarsier Records.

Also in 2022, BGYO released "Be Us", the title track of its second album Be Us, as a collaboration single with Moophs.

In 2024, he worked with vocal coach Anna Achacoso-Graham on Bini's adaptation of "Joy to the World". He also co-wrote BGYO's "Andito Lang" with group member Mikki Claver. Released on December 5, 2024, the song drew on the members' experiences of being away from their families and their relationships with one another.

For Bini's 2026 EP Signals, Moophs co-wrote "Blush" and "Step Back" with Cristiana Aleyna Kocher, Vincent Nantes and Antonio Cuna, professionally known as Sweater Beats. He also co-produced "Step Back" with Sweater Beats and mixed the track.

In 2026, Moophs contributed to the production of 1621's "Oh Ano?", the key track from the group's EP 1621: BEGIN, alongside Kice and Bailey May.

== Artistry ==
Gabbie Tatad of The Philippine Star described Moophs' sound as tropical bass. His classical-guitar background has also informed some of his production work. On Russell Reyes' "Afraid", he incorporated classical guitar, Brazilian percussion and hip-hop elements, drawing on samba and bossa nova guitar playing he had learned from his father. For Gibbs' "Angel Baby", he drew on references to 1980s rock and the music of the James Bond films. The production of Iñigo Pascual's "Lost" combined guitar and synthesizers.

== Discography ==
=== Singles and other songs ===
Selected songs released as a lead, joint or featured artist
Year	Title	Artist billing	Ref.
2015	"Monolith"	Moophs	
2017	"Paralyzed"	Guji featuring Moophs	
2017	"Afterglow"	Skyze and Moophs	
2017	"Phone Down"	Moophs featuring Sam Concepcion	
2017	"Comata Silva"	Moophs featuring Xela	
2017	"Wiwu"	Markus and Moophs	
2018	"Grey"	Kiana V featuring Moophs	
2018	"So Lost"	Kyler and Moophs	
2018	"Follow"	Curtismith and Moophs	
2018	"Steel"	Marlisa and Moophs	
2019	"33Firefly"	Kiana V and Moophs	
2019	"K Bye"	Kiana V and Moophs featuring Sofia	
2019	"Beautiful"	Markus, Iñigo Pascual and Moophs featuring Kyler	
2019	"Catching Feelings"	Iñigo Pascual and Moophs	
2020	"Lost"	Iñigo Pascual and Moophs	
2020	"Rise"	Iñigo Pascual, Sam Concepcion and Eric Bellinger, featuring Vince Nantes, Zee Avi and Moophs	
2021	"Tied"	Bugoy Drilon and Moophs	
2021	"All Out of Love"	Iñigo Pascual and Moophs	
2021	"Angel Baby"	Gibbs and Moophs	
2021	"Araw Mo"	Iñigo Pascual and Moophs	
2021	"Afraid"	Russell Reyes and Moophs	
2021	"Real"	Markus and Moophs	
2022	"I'd Like To"	SAB and Moophs	
2022	"Hotel Room"	Markus, Kyle Echarri and Moophs	
2022	"Ikaw Ang"	Sam Concepcion, Yuridope and Moophs, featuring Yeng Constantino	
2022	"Be Us"	BGYO and Moophs	
2025	"Back Again"	Angia featuring Moophs	

=== Songwriting and production credits ===
Selected songwriting and production credits
Year	Title	Artist	Album or EP	Songwriter	Producer	Ref.
2020	"Lost"	Iñigo Pascual and Moophs	Options	check	check	
2020	"Clouds"	Leila Alcasid and Moophs	Semilucent	—	check	
2020	"Rise"	Iñigo Pascual, Sam Concepcion and Eric Bellinger, featuring Vince Nantes, Zee Avi and Moophs	—	—	check	
2022	"I'd Like To"	SAB and Moophs	—	check	check	
2022	"Hotel Room"	Markus, Kyle Echarri and Moophs	—	—	check	
2022	"Create New Paths"	Denise Julia and Kritiko	—	—	check	
2022	"Be Us"	BGYO	Be Us	check	check	
2022	"Divine"	Marina Summers	—	—	check	
2024	"Andito Lang"	BGYO	BGYO	check	—	
2025	"Heartstrings"	BGYO	BGYO	check	check	
2026	"Blush"	Bini	Signals	check	—	
2026	"Step Back"	Bini	Signals	check	check	
2026	"Oh Ano?"	1621	1621: BEGIN	check	check	

A check mark indicates a songwriting or production credit, including a shared credit. A dash indicates that the cited sources do not specify the album or credit.

== Videography ==
=== Music videos ===
Year	Title	Artist	Ref.
2020	"Lost"	Iñigo Pascual and Moophs	
2022	"Create New Paths"	Denise Julia, Kritiko and Moophs	
2025	"Back Again"	Angia featuring Moophs	

== Awards and nominations ==
Year	Award or competition	Category	Work	Result	Ref.
2018	Awit Awards	Best Dance Recording	"Phone Down" (featuring Sam Concepcion)	Won	
2018	International Songwriting Competition	—	"Phone Down" (featuring Sam Concepcion)	Finalist	
