= Be Us =

Second studio album by BGYO

BE:US

Studio album by BGYO
- Released: 3 November 2022
- Recorded: 2022
- Genre: Pop
- Length: 31:21
- Languages: Filipino; English
- Label: Star Music

BGYO chronology
The Light (2021)	BE:US (2022)	BGYO (2025)

Singles from BE:US
- 1. "Tumitigil Ang Mundo" Released: 13 July 2022; 2. "Magnet" Released: 20 October 2022; 3. "PNGNP" Released: 3 November 2022

Be Us (stylized as BE:US) is the second studio album of Filipino boy band BGYO. It was released on 3 November 2022, through Star Music, a year after its predecessor, The Light (2021). The album's lyrical content was inspired from BGYO's Filipino roots and conferred tribute to the Original Pilipino Music which conveyed a modern-day concept of love and way of courting. Be Us is primarily a pop record, encompassing hip hop, EDM, and disco genres with elements of synth-pop, funk, and R&B which contains eight original tracks including the pre-album release single Tumitigil Ang Mundo, the lead single Magnet, the key track "PNGNP", the song written and composed by BGYO member Mikki entitled "Laro" and four more songs—"Game On", "Be Us", "Panahon", "Extraordinary".

The album debuted and peaked at number 1 on iTunes Albums Chart in 5 countries—Philippines, Hong Kong, Singapore, United Arab Emirates, Saudi Arabia—and also charted in other 10 territories—Vietnam, Australia, Turkey, Kuwait, Oman, Norway, Sweden, New Zealand, Canada and US. Following the release of the album, BGYO delivered a rare feat of having 2 albums and 32 tracks on iTunes Philippines Charts at the same time, the first Filipino act to do so.

== Background ==
The release of Tumitigil Ang Mundo on 13 July 2022, marked the new chapter on BGYO's music career. The track was announced as the first single from their sophomore album. During the group's guest appearance on the Philippines television show It's Showtime, group leader Gelo made a confirmation that BGYO were working on a new album. Speaking about the album in an interview with Miguel Dumaual, BGYO excitedly described the record as an "extraordinary, the best, kakaiba (unique), untouchable and exciting". On a separate interview with NextShark, Mikki revealed that the group really experimented their sound on the new album.

== Music and lyrics ==
The album's lyrical content transcends to the group's Filipino roots by paying homage to the Original Pilipino Music which conveyed a modern-day concept of love and way of courting.

=== Songs ===
The album opens with a glitchy and confrontational, "Game On". Nicholson Baird of VMan labeled the second track, "Magnet", "a punchy pop song, showing off suave vocals which are backed by strong synths" and describing it as a "modernized dancefloor bangers of 90s boy bands". BGYO shared that "[Magnet] talks about fate...a magnetic connection that's hard to resist or control, if you are meant to be together, love will always find its way back, just like a magnet". Dryedmangoez.com classified the title track "Be Us", as "a sweet and romantic summery pop track, with a more laid-back vibe". JE CC of the Lionheartv.net described the fourth track "Tumitigil Ang Mundo", as "the fusion of disco and pop vibes turns the new track into a certified P-POP throbber, that is hard to resist jiving along once the play button is pressed". Michael Major of Broadway World characterized the fifth track "Panahon" as a "bona fide ballad", expressing "as emotive drums enter behind the group harmonizing, you can feel the depth of the emotions on display, as they reach ever further towards their goal of romance personified. He also compared the sixth and the key track "PNGNP", under Drake era saying "driven by a vocal sample, dewy synths, and an energy that's both palpably sexual and fully human". Dryedmangoez.com categorized the seventh track "Laro" as "a good example of how fun it is to hear Filipino lyrics and distinct Filipino cultural traits or aspects in a modern pop song" and emphasized the eighth track "Extraordinary", saying "closes out the album very well..that [has] confident and defiant swagger..leaves a lasting impression on you as you wrap up the album".

== Release and promotion ==
On 10 October 2022, the group's official social media account uploaded a video teaser with the album's name, the lead single and the key track; also announcing the release date. Ten days later, the lead single "Magnet" was officially released. A year after The Light, Be Us was released worldwide on 3 November 2022, in conjunction with a music video of "PNGNP". As part of the album campaign, the group embarked on a US promo tour.

=== Live performances ===
BGYO's first ever live performance of "Tumitigil Ang Mundo" happened at the Mall of Asia via "Tugatog Music Festival", on 15 July 2022 and on the "BE YOU: The World will Adjust Benefit Concert", on 22 July 2022. In 23 July, they also performed "Tumitigil Ang Mundo" at the Resorts World Manila as a part of the Star Magic's kick-off for the "Beyond The Stars Concert Tour". On 29 October 2022, BGYO performed "Magnet" for the first time at the Hallyuween 2022. The group showcased it from the Orleans Arena during the ASAP Natin 'To Las Vegas Concert in matching black and silver outfits. BGYO made their Wish USA Bus debut on 11 November 2022 with a three-song setlist consisting of tracks from the album—"Be Us", "PNGNP" and "Magnet"—as part of the group's US Press Tour. The group also showcased the setlist at the Time Square and Union Square in New York City. On 19 November, the group was featured on MYX Hits Different.

== Reception ==
Francesca Verceles-Zara of andasian.com shared in an article saying, "I really loved the album and it definitely felt like you're [BGYO] settling into your [BGYO] own sound". Dryedmangoez.com expressed in an article saying, "I definitely enjoy this album a little more than their debut..I can see how much they've grown and developed".

== Track listing ==
All song credits are adapted from Tidal, unless otherwise noted.

No.	Title	Writer(s)	Producer(s)	Length
1.	"Game On"	Geca Morales	Jonathan Manalo	4:02
2.	"Magnet"	John Michael Conchada of FlipMusic; Julius James "Jumbo" De Belen of FlipMusic	Bojam of FlipMusic	3:35
3.	"Be Us"	Christopher James Moore Lopez; Nhiko Sabiniano	Moophs; Nhiko Sabiniano	3:56
4.	"Tumitigil Ang Mundo"	Frederico Miguel Claveria (Hiphop Uncles) of Flipmusic; Marcial Domingo Antonio (Hiphop Uncles) of Flipmusic; Julius James "Jumbo" De Belen of FlipMusic	Bojam of FlipMusic	4:08
5.	"Panahon"	Matthew Rey Chang of FlipMusic; Julius James "Jumbo" De Belen of FlipMusic	Bojam of FlipMusic	4:10
6.	"PNGNP"	Brian Barboso; Theo Martel	Kidwolf	3:45
7.	"Laro"	Mikki Claver	Jonathan Manalo	3:58
8.	"Extraordinary"	Frederico Miguel Claveria (Hiphop Uncles) of Flipmusic; Marcial Domingo Antonio (Hiphop Uncles) of Flipmusic; Julius James "Jumbo" De Belen of FlipMusic	Bojam of FlipMusic	3:47
Total length:				31:21

== Release history ==
Country	Date	Format	Label
Various	3 November 2022	Airplay, Digital download, streaming, video streaming	Star Music

== See also ==
- BGYO discography
- List of BGYO live performances
