= Best Time (BGYO song) =

2022 Single by BGYO

Single by BGYO

from the album He's Into Her Season 2 Original Soundtrack
- Released: April 22, 2022
- Recorded: 2022
- Studio: The Purple Room, Quezon City
- Genre: Synth-pop; EDM; Pop
- Length: 3:35
- Label: Star Music
- Songwriters: Jonathan Manalo; Gabriel Tagadtad
- Producer: Manalo

BGYO singles chronology
"Up!" (2022)	"Best Time" (2022)	"Tumitigil Ang Mundo" (2022)

Music video
- "Best Time" on YouTube

"Best Time" is a song recorded by Filipino boy band BGYO released on 22 April 2022, as the official soundtrack for the sequel of iWantTFC's digital Philippine romance comedy series He's Into Her. The song was written and composed by Jonathan Manalo and Gabriel Tagadtad, who also worked with the group's award-winning song He's Into Her.

== Use in He's Into Her Season 2 ==
In the series, the track is used as the opening theme coincide with the first season's original soundtrack "He's Into Her". BGYO performed "Best Time" in the finale episode of the series as a guest performer in "The Benison Ball".

== Composition and lyrics ==
"Best Time" runs for a total of three minutes and thirty-five seconds. The song is set in common time with a tempo of 128 beats per minute and written in the key of D major. The lyrics were written in English by Jonathan Manalo and Gabriel Tagadtad that tackles about celebrating the time spent with a special person; arranged, mixed and mastered by Theo Martel.

== Background and release ==
The snippet of "Best Time" was first heard on 19 March 2022, through an audio sampler released by Star Music on different social media platforms. The official music video of "Best Time" was released on 12 April 2022 and the track's performance video on 14 May 2022, showcasing the group's sharp movements and sleek choreography.

== Reception ==
JE CC of lionhearttv.net shared in his review "Best Time is an earworm with its unique allure, one that perfectly turns it into a compelling teenage love and high school anthem crossover", and even describe it as "a sweet and breezy nostalgia".

== Promotion ==
=== Live performances ===
On 1 May 2022, BGYO performed "Best Time" in front of the live audience on SM Mall of Asia Fashion & Music Hall during the Xiaomi Fan Festival 2022.

=== Television ===
On 2 May 2022, BGYO performed the short A cappella version of "Best Time" on Arirang's TV show Simply K-Pop Con-Tour simulcast via online.

== Music video ==
The music video for "Best Time" was produced by YouMeUs MNL, directed by Amiel Kirby Balagtas and written by Edgar Dale Reciña. Same with "He's Into Her" music video, it was presented inside the school campus of the characters' previous Alma Mater; wherein Gelo, Akira, JL, Mikki, and Nate tiptoeing and reliving their memories as students. The opening scene was set in night time, as the instrumental goes on the boys shows off one by one in the frame, giggling, shouting and happily come together in the meeting spot; then, leads to the magical time travel, directing to the narration of their memories and younger self as students, interspersed with the sleek choreography and ends with escaping the school security guard with Gelo stumbled on the ground as the boys stampede going out in the school premises.

== Credits and personnel ==
All song credits are adapted from the official music video of "Best Time" released by BGYO's label Star Music in YouTube, unless otherwise noted.

- Words & Music by Jonathan Manalo, Gabriel Tagadtad
- Arranged by Theo Martel and Jonathan Manalo
- Mixed and Mastered by Theo Martel
- Guitars by Gabriel Tagadtad
- Vocal arrangement by Jonathan Manalo
- Back-up vocals by BGYO
- Vocal coaching by Jerwin Nicomedez
- Recorded at The Purple Room
- Over-all Produced by Jonathan Manalo

== In popular culture ==
- "Best Time" is used as the key track to support the "Best Time with BGYO Mall Tour".

== Release history ==
Country	Date	Format	Version	Label
Various	April 22, 2022	Airplay, Digital download, streaming, video streaming	Single	Star Music
Various	May 27, 2022	Airplay, Digital download, streaming, video streaming	He's Into Her Season 2 Original Soundtrack	Star Music

== See also ==
- BGYO discography
- List of BGYO live performances
