= Paraiso (Smokey Mountain album) =

Studio album by Smokey Mountain
- Released: 1991
- Recorded: 1991
- Genre: Pop
- Language: English, Filipino
- Label: Musiko Records & BMG Records (Pilipinas), Inc.
- Producer: Judd Berlin

Smokey Mountain chronology
Smokey Mountain (1989)	Paraiso (1991)	Know You Will (1993)

Singles from Paraiso
- 1. "Da Coconut Nut"; 2. "Hideaway"; 3. "Kahit Habang Buhay"; 4. "Kailan (Boy version)" 5. "Nahan Ka?"; 6. "Paraiso"

Paraiso is the second studio album by young Filipino singing group Smokey Mountain. It was released in the Philippines in 1991 by Sony BMG Music. The album slightly surpassed the commercial success of the group's self-titled debut album, also certifying 8× Platinum by the Philippine Association of the Record Industry (PARI) and selling over 253,800 units in the country. It is considered to be one of the biggest-selling albums in the Philippines, overtaking Smokey Mountain (the album) in terms of sales. The album was released in Japan in 1992 with a different track listing.

== Background ==
Having to choose between formal schooling and a "two-year, two album" contract for release in Europe and the United States, original band members Tony Lambino and Jeffrey Hidalgo left the group, while Geneva Cruz pursued a solo career and released her first solo album "I Like You". The popularity of the group already reached its peak at the time of the departure of the group's three members. Because of this, Ryan Cayabyab—who formed, directed and conducted the group—held auditions to find new members to fill in the void of the three founding members who left the group. Cayabyab, then, reformed the group with remaining original member James Coronel, and three new members Shar Santos, Chedi Vergara, and Jayson Angangan. The second batch of the group were the ones who recorded the second album.

== Composition ==
"Da Coconut Nut" is described as a novelty song with a "tropical" mood that Cayabyab wrote for Smokey Mountain, where he allowed himself to have fun, writing the song. The song talks about the benefits of the coconut tree. The title track "Paraiso" is, ironic to its title, about a degrading environment filled with garbage and smog. Because of the commercial and critical success of the first batch's single "Kailan" which was led by Cruz, the second batch recorded a Boy's version of the song and released it as a single.

== Track listing ==
All songs were written and arranged by Ryan Cayabyab.

=== Standard edition ===
1. "King Philip"
2. "Nahan Ka?" [English: Where Are You?]
3. "Da Coconut Nut"
4. "Paraiso" [English: Paradise]
5. "Sama na Kayo" [English: Join Us]
6. "Wanna Say No"
7. "Kahit Habang Buhay" [English: Even for Life]
8. "Hideaway"
9. "Best Friend"
10. "Kailan" (Boy version) [English: When]
11. "Freedom"

=== Japan edition ===
1. "King Philip"
2. "Paraiso"
3. "Tayo Na" [English: Come On]
4. "Nahan Ka?"
5. "Sama na Kayo"
6. "Wanna Say No"
7. "Kahit Habang Buhay"
8. "Da Coconut Nut"
9. "Hideaway"
10. "Best Friend"
11. "Kailan" (Boy version)
12. "Freedom"

== Personnel ==
Credits were taken from Titik Pilipino.

- Jayson Angangan - vocals
- Judd Berlin - executive producer
- Ryan Cayabyab - arranger
- James Coronel - vocals
- Albert Godinez - mixing engineer
- Mario Joson - cover design
- Franklin Oria - recording engineer
- Neil Oshima - photography
- Jun Reyes - recording engineer
- Shar Santos - vocals
- Chedi Vergara - vocals
- Lemenary singer
  - Recorded and mixed at Audio Captain

== Certifications ==
Country	Provider	Certification	Sales
Philippines	PARI	8× Platinum	253,800+

== Release history ==
Country	Released date	Label
Philippines	1991	Sony BMG
Japan	1992	Sony BMG

== See also ==
- List of best-selling albums in the Philippines
