= Na Na Na (Bini song) =

- Promotional image for the Performance Video

Single by Bini

from the album Born to Win
- Language: Tagalog
- Released: June 7, 2022
- Genre: Bubblegum pop; Pop
- Length: 4:11
- Label: Star
- Songwriter: Nica del Rosario
- Producer: Jumbo de Belen

Bini singles chronology
"Up!" (2022)	"Na Na Na" (2022)	"Pit a Pat" (2022)

Music video
- "Na Na Na" on YouTube

"Na Na Na" is a song by the Filipino girl group Bini from their debut album Born to Win (2021). It was released on June 7, 2022, as a single by Star Music. It was written by Nica del Rosario and produced by Jumbo de Belen. "Na Na Na" is a bubblegum pop and pop song that depicts the feeling of a serotonin boost personified, portraying the thrill of an innocent crush that evokes carefree high school days.

== Composition ==
"Na Na Na" is a pop and bubblegum song and it blends kitsch, camp, and the concept of collective girlhood into a technicolor pop framework. was written by Nica del Rosario and produced by Jumbo de Belen, The song was released as a single on June 7, 2022, and is one of eight original songs on the debut album Born to Win (2021), alongside four foreign language versions of the track. The song depicts the feeling of a serotonin boost personified, portraying the thrill of an innocent crush that evokes carefree high school days.

== Reception ==
Julienne Loreto of &Asian ranked the song number four on "Ranking Every Bini Song So Far". They described Maloi's vocal runs and belts, reflects the heightened emotions of falling for another person. Andrea Posadas of When in Manila stated that the song deserves a place in Bini's Coachella setlist.

== Charts ==
Chart performance for "Na Na Na"
Chart (2024)	Peak position
Philippines Hot 100 (Billboard Philippines)	17
Philippines Top Songs (Billboard Philippines)	11
