= Born to Win (album) =

Studio album by Bini
- Released: October 14, 2021
- Recorded: 2021
- Genres: Pop; EDM; hip hop; R&B; disco
- Length: 39:41
- Languages: English; Tagalog; Indonesian; Japanese; Spanish; Thai
- Label: Star
- Producers: Bojam; Jonathan Manalo; Mu Doctor

Bini chronology
Born to Win (2021)	Feel Good (2022)

Singles from Born to Win
- 1. "Born to Win" Released: June 4, 2021; 2. "Kapit Lang" Released: September 10, 2021; 3. "Golden Arrow" Released: October 14, 2021

Born to Win is the debut studio album of Filipino girl group Bini. It was released by Star Music on October 14, 2021. The album contains twelve tracks, with "Golden Arrow" as its carrier single, five other new tracks "B HU U R" featuring Kritiko, "Na Na Na", "Kinikilig", "8" and "Here with You", four international versions of the group's debut single in Indonesian, Japanese, Spanish and Thai, along with their preceded singles "Born to Win" and "Kapit Lang". The album's lyrical content celebrates love, positivity and empowerment.

The album debuted and peaked at number one on the iTunes Albums Chart in the Philippines. It also charted in Thailand and Hong Kong.

== Background and release ==
It was during the official debut of the group on June 11, 2021, when ABS-CBN Entertainment head Laurenti Dyogi made a statement on the upcoming projects of Bini and its labelmate BGYO—full-length albums, merch and the One Dream: The Bini x BGYO Concert. On September 28, 2021, the group's official social media account announced the schedules and the release of the debut album. Track list of the album was revealed on October 3, 2021 and audio sampler on October 12, 2021.

In 2023, two of the album's component singles, "Kapit Lang" and "Golden Arrow", were sent to the Moon as part of the Lunar Codex archive by NASA.

By October 2024, the album had reached more than 100 million streams on Spotify. On October 31, 2024, Backspacer Records announced that Born to Win, along with Bini's other releases, Feel Good, and Talaarawan, was released as vinyl records in December 2024 as part of their collaboration with Star Music. In 2025, the vinyl records were reissued for sale in response to demand, with a limited pre-sale beginning on May 1, 2025.

== Reception ==
We hope they'll [listeners] be inspired listening to the songs. We hope they'll [listeners] be able to feel their journey and not just hear or see their journey.

— Lian Kyla, songwriter—"Kapit Lang" and "Here With You", Bandwagon Asia

P-Pop group BINI flexes vocal complexity, thematic maturity, and moving sentiments with their debut studio album, Born to Win. [It] is a well-crafted and well-intended debut album that may just have served BINI a more proper and stronger take-off into reaching a higher level in their fast-developing career. Their feathery and flexible vocals are already truly magical assets that make this entire 12-track album noteworthy, but what their songs impart is an even more relevant goldmine.

— JE CC, Lionheartv.net

True to its name, BINI's Born to Win debut album wants to make the listener feel like they can take on any challenge in life. It’s a well-produced album. The group's exploration into the funk and disco sound really suited them well and the group's vocals are stunning, as in they served in that department.

— Rafael Bautista, Nylon Manila

=== Listicles ===
Name of publisher, year listed, name of listicle, and placement
Publisher	Year	Listicle	Placement	Ref.
Billboard Philippines	2024	This Year's Must Have Records	Placed	

== Singles ==
Born to Win yielded three singles. The debut single, "Born to Win", was released in June 2021. The music video of "Born to Win" has received more than 200,000 YouTube views on its first 24 hours of release, making it the fastest among the debut music videos of any P-pop group. In July 2021, a Maxi single of the track was released which features the instrumental, Latin, EDM, string quartet and acapella versions. In September 2021, the song was played in the preliminary competition and performed in the coronation of the Miss Universe Philippines 2021. "Kapit Lang" was released in September 2021 as the group's third single. "Golden Arrow" was released in October 2021 as the album's second single and key track.

== Track listing ==
All tracks are produced by Jonathan Manalo, except where noted.

Born to Win track listing
No.	Title	Writer(s)	Producer(s)	Length
1.	"Born to Win"	Eva Louhivuori; Ryvng; Maynine; Sophia Pae	Mu Doctor; Jonathan Manalo	2:53
2.	"Golden Arrow"	Sabine Cerrado; Maraiah Queen Arceta; Mikhaela Janna Lim; Stacey Aubrey Sevilleja; Ma. Nicolette Vergara		3:47
3.	"B Hu U R" (featuring Kritiko)	Herbs Samonte; Manalo; Kritiko		3:31
4.	"Na Na Na"	Nica Del Rosario	Bojam	4:11
5.	"Kinikilig"	Rox Santos; Rico Gonzales; Trisha Denise; Vergara; Mary Loi Yves Ricalde		3:35
6.	"Kapit Lang"	Lian Kyla; Arceta		2:49
7.	"8"	Vergara		3:46
8.	"Here with You"	Kyla; Athena Antiporda		3:32
9.	"Born to Win" (Bahasa Indonesia version)	Louhivuori; Ryvng; Maynine; Pae; Irwan Simanjuntak		2:53
10.	"Born to Win" (Japanese version)	Louhivuori; Ryvng; Maynine; Pae; Ai Eco Ina		2:53
11.	"Born to Win" (Thai version)	Louhivuori; Ryvng; Maynine; Pae; Tan Onwimon		2:53
12.	"Born to Win" (Spanish version)	Louhivuori; Ryvng; Maynine; Pae; Juan Munoz-Florez		2:53
Total length:				39:41

== Release history ==
Release dates and formats for Born to Win
Region	Date	Format	Label
Various	October 14, 2021	Digital download; streaming	Star Music
Philippines	July 3, 2024	CD	Star Music
Philippines	December 7, 2024	Vinyl	Star Music
