= The Light (BGYO album) =

BGYO's debut studio album

Studio album by BGYO
- Released: 7 October 2021
- Recorded: 2021
- Genre: Hip hop; R&B; pop; EDM; Synth-pop
- Length: 40:25
- Language: Filipino; English; Japanese; Indonesian; Spanish; Thai
- Label: Star Music

BGYO chronology
The Light (2021)	BE:US (2022)

Singles from The Light
- 1. "The Light" Released: January 29, 2021; 2. "He's Into Her" Released: April 23, 2021; 3. "The Baddest" Released: August 20, 2021; 4. "When I'm with You" Released: October 7, 2021; 5. "Kundiman" Released: November 26, 2021

The Light is the debut studio album of Filipino boy band BGYO. It was released by Star Music on 7 October 2021. The album contains twelve tracks, with "When I'm With You" as its key single, four new tracks "Kundiman," "Fly Away," "Sabay," and "Rocketman", which BGYO co-written, four versions of the band's debut single in Bahasa, Japanese, Spanish and Thai, along with the group's signature hits The Light, He's Into Her and The Baddest. The album's lyrical content transcends the spirit of resilience, empathy, and love.

The album debuts and peaks at number 1 on iTunes Albums Chart in 5 countries—Philippines, Hong Kong, Singapore, United Arab Emirates and Saudi Arabia. It also charted in Canada, Thailand, Qatar, Australia, Norway, Malaysia and Mexico; and has achieved the coveted feat of being the longest consecutive charting album by a Filipino act to stay at number one on iTunes Philippines of all time.

The album surpassed 5 million Spotify streams, 2 weeks since its release.

== Background and release ==
On 11 June 2021, ABS-CBN Entertainment head Laurenti Dyogi made a statement during the official debut of BGYO's sister group Bini on the upcoming projects of the sibling groups—full-length albums, merch and the "One Dream: The BINI x BGYO Concert". On 28 September 2021, the group's official social media account announced the schedules and the release of the debut album. Tracklist of the album was revealed on 29 September 2021 and audio sampler on 6 October 2021.

== Composition ==
We hope they'll [listeners] be inspired listening to the songs. We hope they'll [listeners] be able to feel their journey and not just hear or see their journey.

— Lian Kyla, one of the songwriters of "Rocketman", Bandwagon Asia

The Light embodies [BGYO's] journey, and it’s powerful, moving, and anthemic. The Bahasa, Thai, Japanese, and Spanish versions of the group’s debut single (also called "The Light"), feels like it needs to impart a good lesson [that] can be very well used as a campaign song for change. "Fly Away", [is] an extremely relatable track [with] compelling encouragement [to deal with struggles in life]. "Sabay" seemingly echoes that sentiment [too] but uses more danceable beats. On the other hand, "Rocketman" is a proud anthem for Filipinos, our resilience, and our undying spirit to move forward. Radiating around matters of romance are "Kundiman", "He's Into Her", "The Baddest", and "When I’m With You".

— JE CC, Lionheartv.net

The Light is a reflection of the group’s past, present, and possible future. Naming the 12-track album after their debut single "The Light", is a way to symbolize the album’s message [and] it's clear that for their first album, the group wanted to give the feeling of resilience, love, and inspiration.

— Rafael Bautista, Nylon Manila

== Singles ==
The Light yielded four singles. The debut single, "The Light", was released in January 2021. The music video of "The Light" has received more than a million YouTube views, 6 days after its release, and its the fastest debut music video by a P-pop group to reach 1 Million views in YouTube. It also broke the record for being the "Most Liked Music Video in a Debut Song" by a P-pop group of all time. The album's second single "He's Into Her" was released in April 2021 and became the official soundtrack of the original iWantTFC series He's Into Her. "The Baddest" was released in August 2021 as the group's sophomore single and released as the album's fifth single. American hip-hop dance crew Jabbawockeez posted a dance cover of the track in social media and went viral in October 2021. "When I'm with You" was released in October 2021 as the album's third single and key track.

"The Baddest", [is] the song that arguably helped put BGYO on the map internationally.

— Rafael Bautista, Nylon Manila

== Track listing ==
All song credits are adapted from the album sampler released by BGYO's label Star Music in YouTube, unless otherwise noted.

No.	Title	Writer(s)	Producer(s)	Length
1.	"The Light"	Distract; MU Doctor (뮤닥터); Angelo "Gelo" Troy Rivera; Akira "Aki" Morishita; John Lloyd "JL" Toreliza; Michael "Mikki" Claver Jr.; Nathaniel "Nate" Porcalla	Rogan; Ddank	3:12
2.	"He's Into Her"	Jonathan Manalo; Gabriel Tagadtad	Jonathan Manalo	4:01
3.	"When I'm with You"	Kidwolf	Jonathan Manalo	3:52
4.	"Fly Away"	Akira "Aki" Morishita	Jonathan Manalo	3:31
5.	"The Baddest"	Tha Aristocratz; Tiyon "TC" Mack (Tagalog rap lyrics by Angelo "Gelo" Troy Rivera and Akira "Aki" Morishita)	MU Doctor (뮤닥터)	3:16
6.	"Rocketman"	Lian Kyla; Athena Antiporda (additional lyrics by Jonathan Manalo and rap lyrics by Nathaniel "Nate" Porcalla)	Jonathan Manalo	3:25
7.	"Sabay"	Michael "Mikki" Claver Jr.	Jonathan Manalo	2:50
8.	"Kundiman"	Akira "Aki" Morishita (additional lyrics by Jerwin Nicomedez)	Jonathan Manalo	3:27
9.	"The Light - Bahasa Indonesia Version"	Rogan; Ddank (translated by Irwan Simanjuntak)	Jonathan Manalo	3:11
10.	"The Light - Japanese Version"	Rogan; Ddank (translated by Ai Eco Ina)	Jonathan Manalo	3:12
11.	"The Light - Spanish Version"	Rogan; Ddank (translated by Eric Garcia)	Jonathan Manalo	3:11
12.	"The Light - Thai Version"	Rogan; Ddank (translated by Tan Onwimon)	Jonathan Manalo	3:11
Total length:				40:25

== Awards and nominations ==
Award ceremony	Year	Category	Nominated work	Result	Ref.
Asian Academy Creative Awards	2021	Best Theme Song or Title Theme (Philippines)	He's Into Her	Won	
Asian Academy Creative Awards	2021	Best Theme Song or Title Theme (Asia)	He's Into Her	Finalist	
RAWR Awards	2021	Song of the Year	The Light	Nominated	
7th Wish Music Awards	2021	Wishclusive Pop Performance of the Year	The Light	Nominated	

== Release history ==
Country	Date	Format	Label
Various	October 7, 2021	Airplay, Digital download, streaming, video streaming	Star Music

== See also ==
- BGYO discography
- List of BGYO live performances
