= King Girado =

Filipino singer, musician, model and actor

King
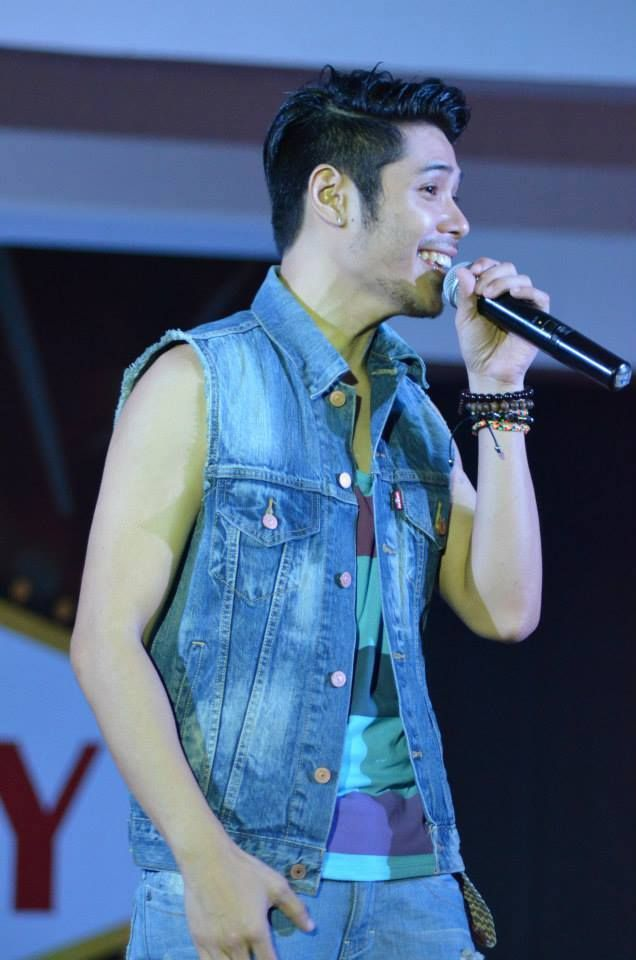
- King in 2015

Background information
- Born: Filbert Barinos Girado, Jr. Pasay, Metro Manila, Philippines
- Education: Far Eastern University
- Genres: Pop, R&B, acoustic
- Occupations: Singer, model, actor, television personality
- Years active: 2004–present
- Label: Star Music (since 2004)

Filbert Barinos Girado Jr., better known by his stage name King, is a Filipino singer, musician, model and actor. He graduated with a degree of Bachelor of Science in Medical Technology from Far Eastern University. He is known for his hit songs such as "Maybe", "Bat 'di Mo Pagbigyan", and "Will You Wait for Me" from his albums Solo and The Reason I Exist under Star Music.

== Biography ==
During his childhood, King was not interested in singing. However, he grew up in a music-filled environment. He is the second child of four by Filbert Girado Sr., a businessman and former member of The Bayanihan Vocal Group, and Daulet Girado, a nurse who is also musically inclined. He is also the brother of Asia's Diamond Soul Siren Nina. His mom paid for him to learn the piano, but King told his younger sister Nina to go in his place. While he did show talent, King did not entertain the idea of being a singer. It was during his teen years when he discovered New Kids On The Block. He was fascinated by the high-pitched falsetto of Jordan Knight and wanted to be like him.

The love of music in the entertainment industry is too good to be resisted and King finally decided to try his luck in the music industry. King just respected the call to become a singer and joined his sister Nina as the frontman of the band MYMP. He also joined the boyband IdolZone 2 and formed his own group Domain when the band did not work out.

The last band he joined was Spunk. And when it fell apart, Star Records offered him an opportunity. Star Records at that time was planning to establish a local boy group, equivalent to international bands such as 'NSYNC and Backstreet Boys. King immediately grabbed the chance and auditioned. He was accepted but told to wait for they were lacking some more members.

Eventually, the plan of putting up a local boy band was set aside and he was chosen to be a part of the ”Solo” album project, a three-in-one album, performing with two other artists. The three was launched to stardom as solo performer through Solo. King's first single “Maybe” hit the #1 spot in radio stations and established King as a recording artist. The album was awarded certified Gold status during King's Birthday celebration in ASAP.

In 2004, King launched his own album entitled The reason I exist at the Hardrock cafe together with the launch of his new music video "Ba't di mo pagbigyan".

He sang the Tagalog theme song Ikaw ang buhay Ko, an adaptation form the Taiwanese song Cun Zai for the 5566 Taiwanese Idol drama TV series Westside Story in ABS-CBN.

The Center for Pop Music Philippines awarded King as 2005 Singing Ambassador, a year after his sister Nina.

King represented the Philippines in the 2008 World Championships of Performing Arts and brought home medals in four categories in the male vocalist division.

He has held live concerts in other countries such as in the US, Saipan, Dubai, Japan and Papua New Guinea.

== Media appearances ==
Before King entered showbusiness, he had done television commercials such as Talk N' Txt, Nescafe and Lotus ballpen. In 2005, he did a Mexicorn TV commercial with actress Pauleen Luna.

He has become part of the Sunday variety show ASAP of ABS CBN after performing at the Happy 50TV concert with F4, Barbie Hsu and other Local artists.

He was chosen by MTV Philippines as their Rising Star of the Month of April 2004.

King appeared in an episode in Buttercup (TV series) of ABS CBN as a bar performer singing his song Muli mong mahalin.

He interpreted the song Huwag Ka Nang umiyak during the finals competition night of the 2004 Himig Handog Love songs which was recorded by True faith for the soundtrack.

King joined his fellow Star Music and ABS CBN artists in 2005 recording and doing a music video for the Philippine Tourism Authority entitled "Pilipino sa Turismo’y Aktibo" featuring the Philippines' sights, destinations and cultural heritage.

King Appeared in a couple of his sister Nina's music video and also helped her conceptualize her latest 2011 album "Stay Alive".

== Discography ==
=== Studio albums ===
- 2003: Solo/Josh, Divo, King (King, Divo Bayer, Josh Santana) - received gold record award in 2004
- 2004: The Reason I Exist

=== Other albums ===
- 2003: The Brightest Stars of Christmas Star Music
- 2004: My first Romance (Movie Soundtrack) Star Music
- 2004: Weekend Love (Movie Soundtrack) Star Music
- 2005: Krystala (Original Soundtrack) Star Music
- 2011: Baby & Just the way You are Non-stop Christmas Medley with Beatphonics Warner Music Philippines

== Awards ==
- 1997: Grand champion Heartthrobs 911 sing and lookalike contest (Sang Linggo NAPO Sila, ABS CBN)
- 2005: Gold record award for Solo Album (Star Music)
- 2005: Gold record award for King The reason I exist (Star Music)
- 2005: Center for Pop Music Philippines Ambassador
- 2006: Best Male Performer (National Consumers Quality Awards)
- 2008: Gold Medal (Rock Category) World Championships of the Performing Arts
- 2008: Silver Medal (Contemporary Category) World Championships of the Performing Arts
- 2008: Silver Medal (Broadway Category) World Championships of the Performing Arts
- 2008: Bronze Medal (Gospel Category) World Championships of the Performing Arts

== Nominations ==
- 2004: Best Male performer (Maybe), The Awit Awards
- 2004: Best New Male performer (Maybe), The Awit Awards
- 2005: Best Male performer for Hotels, bars and Lounges, The Aliw Awards
- 2006: Best Male performer for Hotels, bars and Lounges, The Aliw Awards
