= Da Coconut Nut =

1991 song by Ryan Cayabyab

Song by Smokey Mountain

from the album Paraiso
- Genre: Novelty
- Length: 3:37
- Label: BMG, Musiko
- Songwriter: Ryan Cayabyab
- Producer: Ryan Cayabyab

"Da Coconut Nut" is a song composed by Filipino national artist Ryan Cayabyab for the band Smokey Mountain in 1991.

== Composition ==
The song's lyrics describe the uses of the different parts of a coconut tree. Cayabyab, in an interview with ABS-CBN, said that the song was composed in the novelty style popularized by Yoyoy Villame, whom at times the song was incorrectly attributed to. The song borrows some melodies from Guy Lombardo's 1944 recording of "It's Love-Love-Love".

== Performance ==
The song became part of the concert programs of choirs in the United States after a deal in July 2008 allowed its publication in the choral arrangement in Randy Stenson's Santa Barbara Music Publishing of California catalogue and performed in the American Choral Directors National Convention. Stenson first heard the song performed by a Hawaiian choir. Cayabyab claimed that the song became popular among American choirs ever since.

In July 2017, when a video of the Baylor University School of Music Men's Choir performing the song before crew and passengers in an Emirates plane cabin became popular, the choir stated that it had been singing the song since 2010.

The song has been licensed for use for promotions featuring the coconut-based Malibu rum.

== Reception ==
Khmer Times described the song as a "whimsical Filipino piece." Philippine Daily Inquirer editor Rito Asilo characterized the song as a "wackily irreverent novelty hit". When the song was performed during Barack Obama's visit to the Philippines, Rappler described the song as a "classic ditty".

== Bini version ==
"Da Coconut Nut"

Single by Bini
- Released: November 20, 2020
- Genre: EDM; Pinoy pop; electropop
- Length: 3:32
- Label: Star
- Songwriter: Ryan Cayabyab

Bini singles chronology
| "Da Coconut Nut" (2020) | "Born to Win" (2021) |

Music video
- "Da Coconut Nut" on YouTube

"Da Coconut Nut" was covered by Filipino girl group Bini as their pre-debut single. It was released on November 20, 2020 as a digital single by Star Music. The single was intended to pay homage to Ryan Cayabyab.
