= Kundiman (BGYO song) =

2021 single by BGYO

Single by BGYO

from the album The Light
- Language: Filipino
- Released: 7 October 2021
- Recorded: 2021
- Studio: The Purple Room, Quezon City
- Genre: R&B; Soul Ballad
- Length: 3:28
- Label: Star Music
- Composer: Akira Morishita
- Lyricists: Akira Morishita (additional lyrics by Jerwin Nicomedez)
- Producer: Jonathan Manalo

BGYO singles chronology
"When I'm with You" (2021)	"Kundiman" (2021)	"Mahal Na Kita" (2022)

Music video
- "Kundiman" on YouTube

"Kundiman" is a song recorded by the Filipino boy band BGYO. It was released on 7 October 2021 as the eighth single of their debut album The Light. It was written and composed by Akira Morishita with additional lyrics from Jerwin Nicomedez. The track was one of the BGYO songs—"Kundiman", "He's Into Her", "The Baddest"—chosen to be part of The Lunar Codex's "Polaris Collection" time capsules bound to the Moon in 2023. The track peaked at number 1 on Deezer Charts 100 in United Arab Emirates.

== Composition and lyrics ==
"Kundiman" runs for a total of three minutes and twenty-eight seconds, set in common time with a tempo of 78 beats per minute and written in the key of D♯/E♭ major. The lyrics were written in Filipino that tackles about a romantic love but given a modern twist. In the song, the word "Kundiman" was described in two different meanings—"Kundiman", as a genre of traditional Filipino love songs and "Kundiman", as a contraction of the Tagalog phrase "kung hindi man" (transl. if it is not so).

== Background and release ==
As the eighth single of The Light album, the snippet of "Kundiman" was first heard in the audio sampler released by Star Music on 29 September 2021 and was officially released on 7 October 2021. Forty-five days after, the announcement for the release of the track's music video was unveiled through a social media post on 21 November 2021, while photo teasers of the BGYO members was released on 24 November 2021 as individual art series which eventually taken from the official music video and was released on 26 November 2021. It was the fifth music video of the group to release since their debut.

== Reception ==
Nino Llanera of MYX Global shared in an article saying, "We can all agree that the "Kundiman" music video brought all the right vibes,..the video was spot on and really captured the romantic and suave lyrics and melodies of this BGYO track". JE CC of Lionhearttv.net expressed in an article saying, "Kundiman is a beautiful surprise as it featured the group's layered vocals". Rafael Bautista of Nylon Manila described the song as "an excellent showcase of the group's vocals... their best performance on The Light album and proof that they are more than just pretty faces".

Due to the public demand, reactors and fans, on BGYO's choreography with their song "Kundiman"; a performance video was released on 17 December 2021.

== Promotion ==
=== Live performances ===
On 29 October 2022, the group performed "Kundiman" on the first ever K-pop Halloween Concert in the Philippines—Hallyuween 2022.

=== Television ===
On 19 December 2021, "Kundiman" debuts on ASAP Natin 'To stage, as BGYO performed it live.

== Music video ==
The music video for "Kundiman" was produced by YouMeUs MNL, directed by Amiel Kirby Balagtas and written by Edgar Dale Reciña. It was presented in a picturesque with an opening scene in a picnic setup with Akira walking through it, as the instrumental goes on the other boys of BGYO shows off in the frame; Gelo was in the garden while JL, Mikki and Nate were inside the mansion; wearing fashionable outfits taking reference with the Ilustrados with BGYO's visual director—Danyl Geneciran—emphasized in an interview saying "the music video is a trip to the '70s while also drawing inspiration from French pompadours and Hollywood legends". The solo scenes were shown along the verses while having a magical transition from the reality into art, interspersed with the smooth and sleek choreography showcased in between chorus and mini-dance breaks.

== Credits and personnel ==
All song credits are adapted from the official music video of "Kundiman" released by BGYO's label Star Music in YouTube, unless otherwise noted.

- Words & Music by Akira Morishita
- Additional Music and Lyrics by Jerwin Nicomedez
- Arranged by Tommy Katigbak
- Mixed by Tim Recla
- All Vocals Recorded by Jonathan Manalo at The Purple Room Studios
- Vocal Arrangement by Jonathan Manalo and Jerwin Nicomedez
- Mastered by Jett Galindo at The Bakery USA
- Over-all Production by Jonathan Manalo

== Awards and nominations ==
Year	Award ceremony	Category	Nominated work	Result	Ref.
2022	35th AWIT Awards	Best Performance by Group Recording Artist	Kundiman	Pending	

== Release history ==
Country	Date	Format	Label
Various	7 October 2021	Airplay, Digital download, streaming	Star Music
Various	26 November 2021	video streaming	Star Music

== See also ==
- BGYO discography
- List of BGYO live performances
