= When I'm with You (BGYO song) =

2021 single by BGYO

Single by BGYO

from the album The Light
- Language: English
- Released: 7 October 2021
- Recorded: 2021
- Studio: The Purple Room, Quezon City
- Genre: EDM-Pop
- Length: 3:52
- Label: Star Music
- Songwriter(s): Kidwolf
- Producer(s): Jonathan Manalo

BGYO singles chronology
"Kulay (Miss Universe Philippines 2021)" (2021)	"When I'm with You" (2021)	"Kundiman" (2021)

Music video
- "When I'm with You" on YouTube

"When I'm with You" is a song recorded by the Filipino boy band BGYO. It was released on 7 October 2021 as a key track and the third single of their debut album The Light. It was written and composed by Kidwolf. The song has been selected to be part of Spotify's "Radar Philippines", since March 2022. The track peaked at number 1 on Deezer Charts 100 in Saudi Arabia and United Arab Emirates.

== Composition and lyrics ==
"When I'm with You" runs for a total of three minutes and fifty-two seconds, set in common time with a tempo of 100 beats per minute and written in the key of D major. The lyrics were written in English with a heavy use of metaphors that tackles about someone's expression of love taking reference to superheroes—Batman, Superman, Colossus, Goliath, Hulk, Iron Man, James Bond, James Dean, Darna, Wonder Woman; feeling safe and being secured to that one person they desire. It was also describe as a gratitude song dedicated to their fans, the ACEs.

== Background and release ==
As the carrier single of The Light album, the snippet of "When I'm with You" was first heard in the audio sampler released by Star Music on 29 September 2021. On 6 October 2021, the music video teaser was revealed and was officially released on 7 October 2021.

== Reception ==
JE CC of lionhearttv.net shared in his review "When I'm with You sounds like a tender summer anthem, but it can be very well played as anybody's addictive earworm, all year round" and even describe it as "a perfect road trip song".

== Promotion ==
=== Live performances ===
On 22 March 2022, the group performed the track on the Star Magic's 'Beyond the Stars' Trade Event.

=== Television ===
On 10 October 2022, "When I'm with You" debuts on ASAP Natin 'To stage. A special performance video was also disclosed through MTV Asia as a part of being the channel's "Spotlight Artist" for the month of October and November 2021.

== Music video ==
The music video for "When I'm with You" was produced by YouMeUs MNL, directed by Amiel Kirby Balagtas and written by Edgar Dale Reciña and was set in Tagaytay, Philippines. The opening scene was set in day time with Nate playing the acoustic piano, as the instrumental goes on the boys of BGYO—Gelo, Akira, JL, Mikki and Nate shows off in the frame and were in a road trip; wearing cool and casual outfits. The lyrics were shown in the screen during the chorus, interspersed with solo scenes in the verses; that symbolizes each members strengths and weaknesses and sleek choreography during the dance breaks.

== Credits and personnel ==
All song credits are adapted from the official album sampler of The Light released by BGYO's label Star Music in YouTube, unless otherwise noted.

- Words & Music by Kidwolf
- Additional vocal arrangements and melody and bridge by: Brian Ronald Barbaso
- Arranged & Mixed by Theo Martel
- All Vocals Recorded by Jonathan Manalo at The Purple Room Studios
- Vocal Arrangement by Jonathan Manalo and Jerwin Nicomedes
- Mastered by Jett Galindo at The Bakery USA
- Over-all Production by Jonathan Manalo
- Choreography by : Michael Perz, Reden Blanquera and Adam Alonzo

== Release history ==
Country	Date	Format	Label
Various	7 October 2021	Airplay, Digital download, streaming, video streaming	Star Music

== See also ==
- BGYO discography
- List of BGYO live performances
