= The Reason I Exist =

Studio album by King Girado
- Released: April 14, 2004
- Genre: Pop
- Length: 43:51
- Languages: English; Tagalog
- Label: Star
- Producers: Anabelle M. Regalado (executive); Enrico C. Santos (executive); Charo Santos-Concio (executive); Jonathan Manalo

King Girado chronology
Solo (2003)	The Reason I Exist (2004)

Singles from The Reason I Exist
- 1. "Maybe" Released: 2004; 2. "Ba't 'Di Mo Pagbigyan" Released: 2004; 3. "Will You Wait for Me" Released: 2004

The Reason I Exist is the second studio album by Filipino singer King Girado, released in the Philippines in April 2004 by Star Records. King did the media launch for the album during his birthday together with the launch of his new music video of the carrier single, "Ba't 'Di Mo Pagbigyan", and his own website, kingedgeofrnb.com, followed by a birthday show at the Hard Rock Cafe in Manila for his fans.

The album consists of ten tracks, including the song "Never Let You Go" with rapper Gloc-9, and her sister, Nina. Two of the songs from the album were included in ABS CBN TV series soundtrack - "Maybe" for Sana'y Wala Nang Wakas and "Ikaw ang Buhay Ko" for the Taiwanese Idol Dramas TV series, Westside Story in ABS-CBN. King did a duet version of "Ba't 'Di Mo Pagbigyan" with Maoi David for the Krystala soundtrack. "Will You Wait for Me" was the last song released from this album. It has reached Gold status by the Philippine Association of the Record Industry, selling over 15,000 units in the country.

== Track listing ==
All tracks were produced by Jonathan Manalo except track 3.

No.	Title	Writer(s)	Arranger(s)	Length
1.	"Maybe"	Jimmy Antiporda, Jamie Rivera	Jimmy Antiporda	4:29
2.	"Will You Wait for Me"	Watkins, Wilson, Kavana	Jimmy Antiporda	3:44
3.	"Ba't 'Di Mo Pagbigyan"	Jimmy Antiporda	Jimmy Antiporda	3:48
4.	"Ikaw ang Buhay Ko"	Chuan-Xiong Zou, Zi-Yun Wu, Xin-Rang Chen / Jonathan Manalao	Paolo Zarate	4:58
5.	"Muli Mong Mahalin"	Jonathan Manalo, Jonathan Florido	Ferdie Marquez	4:35
6.	"Never Let You Go"	Jonathan Manalo	Francis Guevarra	3:53
7.	"Hindi Mo Na Ba Minamahal"	aaron paul del Rosario	Paolo Zarate	4:41
8.	"Sana ay Malaman Mo"	Odette Quesada, Bodjie Dasig	Arnold Jallores	5:07
9.	"Bakit Hanggang Ngayon"	Jonathan Manalo	Paolo Zarate	4:19
10.	"Tuloy Parin/Iyong-Iyo"	Ito Rapadas, David Mark Lava	Gino "Booze" Cruz	4:17

== Personnel ==
- Ian G. Castanares - cover layout and design
- Beth Faustino - A & R coordination
- Nina - lead vocals (track 6)
- Ronnie Salvacion - photography
- Jonathan Manalo - album producer
- Monina B. Quejano - A & R coordination
- Anabelle M. Regalado - executive producer
- Jonathan Manalo- vocal arrangement
- Henrich Ngo - cover concept
- Charo Santos-Concio - executive producer
- Enrico C. Santos - executive producer
- King Girado - vocals
- Nixon Sy - cover concept
- Arnold Jallores - mastering
- Nathan de Leon, Nixon Sy - stylist
- Gloc-9 - lead vocals (track 6)

== Certifications ==
Country	Provider	Certification	Sales
Philippines	PARI	Gold	15,000+
