= Born to Win (song) =

2021 single by BINI

- Official Single Cover

Single by BINI

from the album Born to Win
- Released: 4 June 2021
- Recorded: 2021
- Genre: Electropop
- Length: 2:53
- Label: Star
- Composers: RYVNG(StupidSquad); Maynine(StupidSquad)
- Lyricists: RYVNG(StupidSquad); Maynine(StupidSquad); Eva Louhivuori

BINI singles chronology
"Da Coconut Nut" (2020)	"Born to Win" (2021)	"Kapit Lang" (2021)

Music video
- "Born to Win" on YouTube

"Born to Win" is the debut single of the Filipino girl group Bini. It was released on 4 June 2021 as a digital single by Star Music. MU Doctor Studio collaborated with Helsinki-based artist/composer Eva Louhivuori, who has worked also with Gugudan and Mirei Toyama; and RYVNG and Maynine of StupidSquad for the composition and arrangement of the song; mixing, mastering, and digital editing were done by Jang Tae In at Seoul Archive, who has worked also with BGYO's "The Light".

The official track surpassed 100,000 streams on Spotify, 17 days after its release. The music video of "Born to Win" has received more than 200,000 YouTube views on its first 24 hours of release, making it the fastest among the debut music videos of any P-pop group.

== Background and release ==
"Born to Win" premiered on Star Music's YouTube channel late night of 3 June 2021 in the Philippines as a lyric video and on 4 June 2021, it was officially released worldwide via digital download.

Shooting for the official music video was partly held in the mountains of Rizal. The video was released on 11 June 2021 through BINI's official YouTube channel.

== Composition and lyrics ==
"Born to Win" is a full-length English song that runs for a total of two minutes and fifty-three seconds. The song is set in common time with a tempo of 108 beats per minute and written in the key of A minor. The lyrics were written by Eva Louhivuori, RYVNG and Maynine of StupidSquad. The chorus was contributed by Sophia Pae.

The Manila Standard called "Born to Win" "an elegant, yet fierce electronic-pop track with strong melodic hooks, while showing off the group’s crisp vocals that speaks about courage, strength, and determination". Lionheartv.net described the track as "an electronic-pop tune where BINI sings about seizing the moment and rising above challenges".

== Promotion ==
=== Virtual event ===
As part of the online concert, "BINI: The Launch", viewers were delighted with the sneak live performance of "Born to Win" before the official release of the music video. On 29 August 2021, the group performed "Born to Win" on "Happy Hallyu Day 5: A Virtual Fest".

=== Television ===
Bini performed the full length of "Born to Win" for the first time live on ASAP Natin 'To on 13 June 2021. On 3 July 2021, the group performed the song on It's Showtime for the first time.

On 19 September 2021, Bini teamed up with BGYO on a ASAP Natin 'To performance with The Light and "Born to Win". On 26 September 2021, the group performed the song in the coronation of the Miss Universe Philippines 2021.

== Music video ==
Prior to the release of "Born to Win" official music video, teasers were posted throughout social media platforms.

The music video was presented in an electrifying sequences and various futuristic settings. It was produced by YouMeUs MNL, directed by Amiel Kirby Balagtas and written by Edgar Dale Reciña, who worked also with BGYO's He's Into Her. The opening scene features a solar eclipse with a narrative flash-forward scenes of Jhoanna, Maloi, Aiah, Gwen, Stacey, Colet, Mikha and Sheena then leads to a luminous cube-shaped vessel, carrying the group, descending onto a rock formation interspersed with dance sequences choreographed by Star System of Cube Entertainment headed by Kim Hyunjin, who worked with K-Pop acts such as Hyuna, 4Minute, CLC, and (G)I-dle.

It was a well-received music video as it trended on YouTube on the day of its release.

== Credits and personnel ==
Credits adapted from the description of Bini's "Born to Win" music video, unless otherwise stated.

- Eva Louhivuori - lyrics; composition
- RYVNG(StupidSquad) - composition; arrangement
- Maynine(StupidSquad) - composition; arrangement
- Colet Vergara - vocal arrangement
- Sophia Pae - lyrics
- Jang Tae In - mixing and mastering

== In popular culture ==
- On 18 June 2021, Bini introduced a "Born to Win" dance challenge via TikTok.
- On 23 September 2021, the song played in the preliminaries of the Miss Universe Philippines 2021.

== Accolades ==
Awards and nominations received by Bini
Award	Year (Note: Indicates the year of ceremony. Each year is linked to the article about the awards held that year, wherever possible.)	Category	Result	Ref.
Awit Awards	2022	Best Music Video	Nominated	
Awit Awards	2022	Best Performance by a New Group Recording Artist	Nominated	
Rawr Awards	2021	Song of the Year	Nominated	
Wish Music Awards	2021	Wish Pop Song of the Year	Nominated	

=== Listicles ===
Publisher	Year	Listicle	Placement	Ref.
Billboard Philippines	2025	8 Underrated Bini Songs You Should Listen to Right Now	Placed	
