= Denise Julia =

Filipino singer (born 2002)

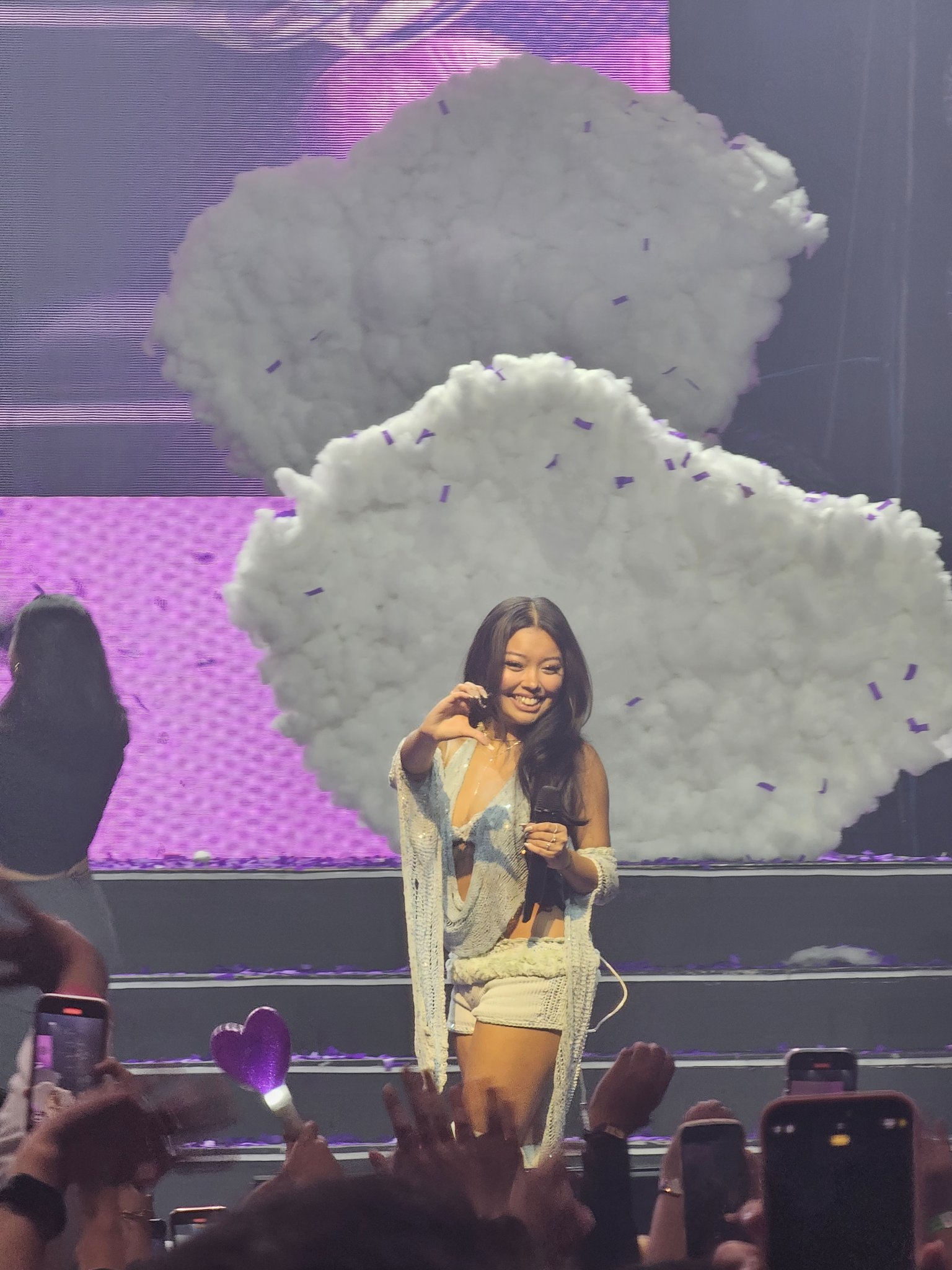
- Julia in 2024
- Born: Julia Denise Lee; February 24, 2002 (age 24); Manila, Philippines
- Occupations: Singer; songwriter; record producer; model; content creator; actress
- Years active: 2020–present
- Agents: The Team (until 2026); United Talent Agency (2026–present)
- Musical career
- Genres: R&B; pop; OPM
- Labels: Sony Music (2022–2025); 2nd Floor Entertainment; Empire; (2026 – Present)
- Website: denisejulia.com

Julia Denise Lee (born February 24, 2002), better known by her stage name Denise Julia, is a Filipina singer-songwriter, record producer, and model. She signed with Sony Music Philippines. In 2026, she moved to Empire Distribution, a record label in the United States. Numerous media outlets have recognized Julia as a leading figure in the new wave of Filipino R&B.

Julia later released her first official song, "High on Me", on August 31. She earned widespread recognition when her song "Nvmd" (Note: Stylized in all caps and pronounced as "never mind".) went viral on TikTok in 2022.

She released her debut mini-album, Sweet Nothings (Chapter 1), on November 17, 2023. In March 2024, the Philippine digital news organization Republic Asia awarded Julia with their inaugural "Artist of the Month" title from the newly launched RA Spotlight, a Gen Z-oriented platform dedicated to rising young artists in the country.

== Early life and education ==
Julia Denise Lee was born on February 24, 2002, in Tondo, Manila. Julia's childhood dream was to be an actress, but decided to pursue music instead when she discovered her own musical talents. She began writing songs at the age of 13 and downloaded digital audio workstations to learn song production.

She transferred to De La Salle University (DLSU) in her final years of high school, where the new environment compelled her to become more socially confident. At DLSU, she became the president of a singing organization and met various producers. Julia later studied international relations with a minor in Japanese studies at the Ateneo de Manila University, where she was also a member of the Ateneo Musicians' Pool.

== Career ==
=== 2020–2022: Beginnings and rise ===
In June 2020, Julia was an extra in the music video for the hit Pinoy pop song "Marikit" by Juan Caoile and Kyle Caplis. She said that her appearance on the music video inspired her to work on her own songs. On August 31, Julia released her first official song, "High on Me".

On February 4, 2022, Julia released the song "Nvmd", which sampled the song "Vintage" by the Indonesian R&B-pop artist Niki.

=== 2023–present: Further recognition ===
Julia released her debut mini-album, Sweet Nothings (Chapter 1), on November 17, 2023.

On January 19, 2024, Julia revealed that she recently filmed a music video for the track "Sugar n' Spice" and teased that it was directed by a woman. Many fans believed that the award-winning filmmaker Samantha Lee, who is widely known for her sapphic films such as Billie and Emma (2018) and Rookie (2023), directed the music video. Julia described the video as a tribute to "the beautiful experience of falling for a woman". The director was later confirmed to be Lee. The music video was released in early February. It incorporated various references to the 2000s and 2010s media and starred Julia and Rookie cast member Angela Cepeda. The two women portrayed lovers simply enjoying an afternoon in each other's company, with sweet scenes such as Cepeda jokingly proposing to Julia with a cheese ring. The "light, positive, and love-filled" track and video received positive reviews from local and international fans alike. Shortly after, Julia uploaded an episode of her Baddie-Bot vlog series, with Mikha of the girl group Bini as a guest.

In March, Republic Asia awarded Julia with their inaugural "Artist of the Month" title from the newly launched RA Spotlight, a Gen Z-oriented platform dedicated to rising young artists in the country. The publication praised Julia's ability to blend "charm, fire, and raw power" on stage and declared her a "sensation" and an "icon" in their announcement of her win. In July, she performed a duet with Belle Mariano at the latter's birthday concert, Believe, which took place at the Theatre at Solaire in Pasay. On November 11, Julia released her second EP, Sweet Nothings (Chapter 2). In an article about the new release, One Music PHilippines described Julia as "one of the most important and significant voices in Filipino R&B". Julia held her first solo concert, Sweet Nothings: The Denise Julia Experience, at the New Frontier Theater in Quezon City on December 14. Tickets for the concert were sold out. Julia shared that a week before the concert, she suffered from gastroesophageal complications, an episode of post-traumatic stress disorder (PTSD), and panic attacks. "I felt as though my dream was slipping through my fingers", Julia said of her health problems. She called the concert her "saving grace" and expressed her gratitude towards everyone who made it happen.

In May 2026, Julia announced that she had signed with American record label Empire. She also moved from The Team to United Talent Agency.

== Artistry ==
"Sugar n' Spice"
A 27-second sample of Denise Julia's voice from her song "Sugar n' Spice". Publications have described her vocals as "airy", "silky", and "soulful".

Writing for L'Officiel Philippines, Tin Dabbay described Julia's voice as "silky". Januar Junior Aguja of The Freeman called Julia a "quadruple threat", praising her "great" singing voice, stage presence, candid lyrics about dating both men and women, and production work on her own songs. Julia has said that she considers Denise Julia to be her alter ego, as a coping mechanism for the pressures of being in the public eye. According to Julia, she is sweeter and less confident when she's not "portraying" Denise Julia.

In June 2022, Julia stated that she was still refining her skills in song production. At the time, she had only one song that featured her own production. Julia now produces her own songs, as well as other artists'. She says that writing lyrics used to be her favorite aspect of creating a song, but it is now production. According to Julia, she sometimes adds up to 200 vocal layers in a single song. Julia cites 1990s R&B artists such as Beyoncé, Aaliyah, Mariah Carey, and Tamia as inspirations, as well as newer acts like Ariana Grande, Summer Walker, and SZA.

== Personal life ==
Julia is openly pansexual. In a Pride Month interview with Billboard Philippines, she admitted that she has felt the pressure to come out "again and again". She said that she hopes to normalize "girly" and "femme" representation among queer women. In her interview with Mega’s Gianna Sibal, Julia highlighted how uncommon it still is in the industry for a queer woman to embrace a style that is overtly feminine, girly, and sexy. She explained that, through both her fashion and presentation, she wants to affirm that queer women can look and dress this way, and still create music that represents and resonates with their community. In November 2023, Julia underwent an operation to remove her tonsils due to chronic tonsillitis, a condition that otolaryngologist Anthony Jahn links to stress. In 2024, she was diagnosed with severe anxiety, specifically a panic disorder, and reportedly experienced an episode of PTSD.

In December 2024, celebrity photographer BJ Pascual named Julia as the "worst" person he had ever worked for. On a since-deleted viral episode of influencer Killa Kush's podcast, Pascual claimed that he had spent a hefty sum to prepare a photoshoot and music video shoot for Julia, but had to cancel the shoots at the last minute due to Julia and her team's alleged unprofessionalism. Julia, Pascual, and Kush each released various statements about the issue on social media, with Julia firmly denying the accusations of unprofessional behavior. On December 26, Julia announced that she was planning to file lawsuits against Pascual and Kush, including a defamation suit against Pascual.

In November 2025, Julia relocated to New York to pursue a career in the United States.
