= Kapit Lang =

2021 single by Bini

Single by Bini

from the album Born to Win
- Language: Tagalog; English
- Released: September 10, 2021
- Recorded: May 2021
- Genre: Electropop; dance-pop
- Length: 2:50
- Label: Star
- Songwriters: Lian Kyla; Maraiah Queen Arceta
- Producer: Jonathan Manalo

Bini singles chronology
"Born to Win" (2021)	"Kapit Lang" (2021)	"Golden Arrow" (2021)

Music video
- "Kapit Lang" on YouTube

"Kapit Lang" (transl. Hold on) is a song recorded by Filipino girl group Bini, released on September 10, 2021, as the second single for their debut album Born to Win. It was written and composed by Lian Kyla and Bini's Maraiah Queen Arceta and produced by Jonathan Manalo.

The official track debuted at number five on Spotify's New Music Friday Philippines and at number three on iTunes Philippines, since its release.

== Background and release ==
The song "Kapit Lang" was initially developed from a suggestion by Jonathan Manalo for singer-songwriter Lian Kyla to create music that resonated with the challenges of 2020. According to Kyla, the track was not originally intended for Bini but was later adapted for the group. The official track was subsequently released on September 10, 2021, along with its music video.

In 2023, a copy of "Kapit Lang", along with the Bini single "Golden Arrow" was sent to the Moon as part of the Lunar Codex archive by NASA.

== Composition ==
"Kapit Lang" runs for two minutes and fifty seconds. It is set in common time with a tempo of 130 beats per minute and written in the key of C♯/D♭ major. Songwriter Lian Kyla shared that the title "Kapit Lang" was inspired by everyday conversations among friends offering support. She intended the song to reflect her experiences of frustration and sadness during the global pandemic, channeling a message of hope and encouragement. Musically, the track features bright synths, trap-influenced percussion, and a deep bass line, giving it an upbeat, danceable pop sound.

== Promotion ==
=== Television ===
On September 12, 2021, "Kapit Lang" debuted on television through ASAP Natin 'To.

== Music video ==
The music video for "Kapit Lang" was produced by YouMeUs MNL, directed by Amiel Kirby Balagtas, and written by Edgar Dale Reciña, who previously collaborated with the group on the music video for "Born to Win". The video features a bright, pastel color palette and highlights various vacation spots alongside choreographed dance sequences.
