= Up! (Bini and BGYO song) =

2022 song by Bini and BGYO

Single by Bini and BGYO
- Language: English; Filipino
- Released: April 1, 2022
- Recorded: 2022
- Studio: The Purple Room, Quezon City
- Genre: Pop; Disco; Funk
- Length: 3:52
- Label: Star
- Songwriters: Angela Ken; Sabine Cerrado; Lian Kyla; Trisha Denise; Jonathan Manalo
- Producer: Jonathan Manalo

Bini singles chronology
"Kabataang Pinoy" (2022)	"Up!" (2022)	"Pit A Pat" (2022)

BGYO singles chronology
"Mahal Na Kita" (2022)	"Up!" (2022)	"Best Time" (2022)

Music video
- "Up!" on YouTube

"Up!" is a song recorded by the Filipino sibling groups Bini and BGYO released on 1 April 2022, as the tie-in with their documentary film "Bini and BGYO Dubai Adventures". The track is the first collaboration single of the sibling groups, composed by singer-songwriters Angela Ken, Sabine Cerrado (known mononymously as SAB), Lian Kyla and Trisha Denise along with the producer Jonathan Manalo.

== Background and release ==
"Up!" was first heard and announced on March 22, 2022, through an audio sampler released by Star Music on different social media platforms. "Up!" official track was released on April 1, 2022, accompanied by its lyric and music video uploaded on YouTube by Star Music.

== Composition and lyrics ==
"Up!" is a groovy song that runs for a total of three minutes and fifty-two seconds. The song is set in common time with a tempo of 120 beats per minute and written in the key of G minor. The lyrics were written in English and Filipino that tackles about never giving up on achieving one's dreams; arranged by Theo Martel and Jonathan Manalo.

== Reception ==
Philippine Daily Inquirer mentioned in an article, ""Up!" tells the group's struggle to achieve greater heights and make their respective marks in the P-pop industry and on the international music scene". Danielle Domingo of MYX Global explained "the catchy Tagalog-English track inspires listeners to go for one's dream and that hard work does pay off".

== Promotion ==
=== Television ===
On June 12, 2022, the sibling groups performed "Up!" on the Philippines musical variety show ASAP Natin 'To, along with the composers of the track Angela Ken, Sabine Cerrado and Trisha Denise.

== Music video ==
The music video of "Up!" is a compilation of video clips integrated with dance performance of Bini and BGYO, directed by Michael Perz. It was presented and set in Dubai, United Arab Emirates that features the Dubai itineraries of the sibling groups, interspersed with the dance choreography.

== Credits and personnel ==
All song credits are adapted from the official music video of "Up!" released by Star Music in YouTube, unless otherwise noted.

- Words & Music by Angela Ken, Sabine Cerrado, Lian Kyla, Trisha Denise & Jonathan Manalo
- Arranged by Theo Martel & Jonathan Manalo
- Bass by Karel Honasan
- Guitars by Janno Queyquep
- Strings Programmed by Arnold Buena
- Vocal Production & Arrangement by Jonathan Manalo
- BINI vocal coaching/arrangement: Anna Graham
- BGYO vocal coaching/arrangement: Jerwin Nicomedez
- Mix & Mastered by Tim Recla at The Purple Room
- Over-all produced by Jonathan Manalo
- Performance Director / UP MV Videographer & Director - Michael Perz

== Release history ==
Country	Date	Format	Label
Various	April 1, 2022	Digital download, streaming	Star Music

== See also ==
- BGYO discography
- List of BGYO live performances
