= BGYO =

Filipino boy band

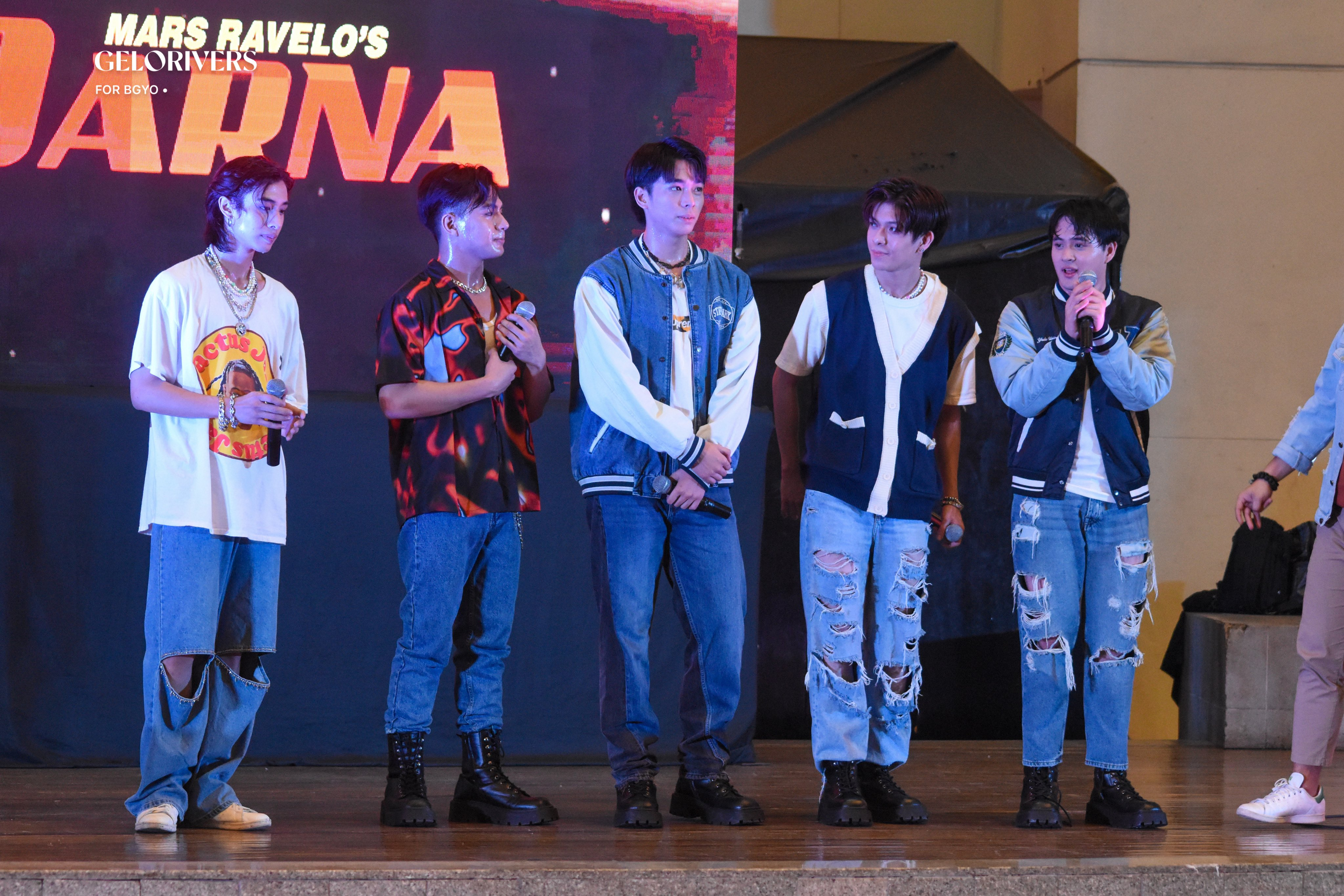
- BGYO in February 2023. From left to right: Mikki, JL, Gelo, Nate, and Akira

Background information
- Also known as: SHA Boys (formerly)
- Origin: Manila, Philippines
- Genres: P-pop; Electronic dance music; R&B; Soul Ballad; Pop rock; dance pop
- Works: Discography; videography; live performances
- Years active: 2021–present
- Label: Star Music
- Members: Gelo; Akira; JL; Mikki; Nate
- Website: bgyo.abs-cbn.com

BGYO (formerly Star Hunt Academy Boys or SHA Boys) is a Filipino boy band formed in 2018 through ABS-CBN's Star Hunt Academy (SHA). The group is composed of Gelo (leader), Akira, JL, Mikki, and Nate.

BGYO debuted on January 29, 2021 with their single "The Light". The group released their second single, "He's Into Her", as part of the official soundtrack of the Philippine romantic comedy series of the same name. The song led to the group earning the "Best Theme Song" award at the 2021 Asian Academy Creative Awards. Their debut album, The Light topped iTunes Philippines' Top 100 albums chart for twelve consecutive days, making it the longest chart topping album by a Filipino act on the platform. The group also featured in the Grammy's "The Many Sounds of Asian Pop" listicle in 2023.

== Name ==
The name BGYO is an acronym for "Becoming the change, Going further, You and I, Originally Filipino". Contrary to popular belief the group's name is not a shortened form of the Filipino word bagyo , meaning "storm" or "tropical cyclone."

== History ==
=== Formation and debut (2018–2020) ===
ABS-CBN launched the SHA program in 2018 for the purpose of introducing Filipino talent into the international market. The first set of male trainees were selected from 250 auditionees from different places in the Philippines and ranged in age from 16 to 19. The initially-envisioned seven-member group was reduced to five, with the final line-up consisting of Gelo (leader), Akira, JL, Mikki, and Nate. The group were trained for two years under Filipino and South Korean mentors from MU Doctor Academy, with vocal coach Kitchy Molina and Austrian-born dance coach Mickey Perz among the Filipino mentors. On August 3, 2019 the five members were officially introduced as the SHA trainees, performing in the online pre-show of the Big Night of Pinoy Big Brother: Otso.

During 2020 the trainees released a number of videos and vlogs showing their training progress and were invited to perform on Happy Hallyu Day 4, the ASAP Natin 'To, and at the 2020 Philippines-Korea Cultural Exchange Festival. On December 4 the group's members signed contracts with Star Magic and record label Star Music. On December 6 they performed on the opening of Pinoy Big Brother: Connect, followed by an appearance on December 12 on It's Showtime, with their performances of Sarah Geronimo's hit songs "Tala" and "Kilometro" going viral. On January 13, 2021 SHA revealed the group's official name and logo.

=== The Light (2021–2022) ===
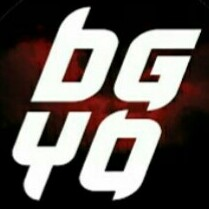
BGYO's wordmark logo

MU Doctor collaborated with South Korean producers Rogan & Ddank for BGYO's debut single "The Light", released on January 29, 2021. The English lyrics were written by Korean-American composer and songwriter Distract, with the Tagalog lyrics written by the members themselves to "reflect their own story in the song". The single was choreographed by Lay Back, who had worked with SuperM, Hyolyn, and Zico.

On April 9, 2021 it was revealed that BGYO would record the official soundtrack of iWantTFC's digital Philippine romance comedy series He's Into Her, and on April 23 their second single, "He's Into Her", was released. On the same day BGYO was added to the roster of Spotify RADAR program. On May 17 BGYO performed a choreographed rendition of Keiko Necesario's "While We Are Young", and three days later an original composition of BGYO and Necesario titled "Runnin'" was announced. On May 21 the group released its first collaboration single, "Feel Good Pilipinas" with KZ Tandingan.

In June 2021 a virtual international fan meet called "BGYO Live Zoom Party" took place, where the group performed "The Light", "He's Into Her", and a cover of "Un Año" by Colombian singer-songwriter Sebastián Yatra and Mexican pop rock band Reik. The group also made an appearance at the official debut of their sister group Bini on June 11, before embarking on their first global caravan – the "Feel Good Pilipinas Global Independence Day Caravan" – which lasted from June 11 to 20. (Note: With Arci Muñoz, Morissette, Jayda, Martin Nievera, and Jed Madela.)

On August 20, 2021 BGYO released their second single, "The Baddest", with Liza Soberano on the music video, and on September 23 "Kulay" was released as a theme song for the Miss Universe Philippines 2021 National Costume Competition. In October of that year the group released their debut album The Light, which includes "The Light", "The Baddest", and "He's Into Her" as well as five new songs – "When I'm with You", "Kundiman", "Sabay", "Fly Away", and "Rocketman" – and four international versions of "The Light" in Bahasa Indonesia, Thai, Spanish, and Japanese. On November 12 the group took part in the official Christmas theme song of ABS-CBN's Christmas Station ID, (Note: The track was released as a theme song of ABS CBN's Christmas ID 2021 alongside Sharon Cuneta, Piolo Pascual, Ogie Alcasid, Regine Velasquez, Kathryn Bernardo, Daniel Padilla, Gary Valenciano, Martin Nievera, Zsa Zsa Padilla, Sarah Geronimo, Vice Ganda, Erik Santos, KZ Tandingan, Darren Espanto, Iñigo Pascual, Donny Pangilinan, Belle Mariano, Seth Fedelin, and Andrea Brillantes.) entitled "Andito Tayo Para sa Isa't Isa".

In December 2021 BGYO appeared and performed on their first international award show at the 2021 Asian Academy Creative Awards, where they were also finalists in the "Best Theme Song" category for "He's Into Her". And on December 3 the group performed in their first international concert, "1MX Dubai 2021 (Filipino Music Festival)" (Note: 1MX Dubai 2021 marked the group's first live performance in front of a live audience with Ez Mil, Bamboo, Moira, BINI, and Gigi De Lana.) in the Dubai World Trade Centre, United Arab Emirates.

In February 2022 "ONE DREAM: The Bini and BGYO Concert Version 2022" was re-broadcast, and on February 27 the group performed in the grand finals of "Uplive World Stage". On March 25 the group released its first original soundtrack for 2022, "Mahal Na Kita", (Note: The track was released as a theme song for the miniseries Bola Bola, in which Akira was one of the lead actors, and was on the EP Bola Bola Original Soundtrack.) and on April 1 the group's first collaboration single with their sister group Bini, "Up!", (Note: The song was released as an original soundtrack of BINI & BGYO Dubai Adventures: A Docufilm.) was released. On April 22, "Best Time" (Note: The track was released as the original soundtrack for He's Into Her (Season 2).) was released.

During May and June 2022 the group performed at the Araneta Coliseum for "2022 PPOPCON: The Ultimate P-pop Fan Gathering"; appeared on the "ABS-CBN and PACE Media Congress Digital Caravan"; participated in Xiaomi Fan Festival 2022 and on the Simply K-Pop Con-Tour; performed at the "4th Herons Heroes Awards – University of Makati" and "A Light of Hope Virtual Concert: for the Youth, their Moms and Educators"; took part in the "Tarlac 149th Founding Anniversary"; and performed on the PBA 47th Season – Opening. On June 6 they were recognized as having been "Best International Artist" on the Korean star voting web application Dong-A.com's "Idolpick (아이돌픽)" for seven consecutive weeks and hailed as the "Best Idol for the month of June", which gave them the opportunity to appear on several digital billboards in Seoul, South Korea. On June 14, Netflix Philippines premiered its first variety show, Alas Netflix, featuring BGYO in its first 3 episodes.

=== Be:Us (2022–2024) ===
The release on July 13, 2022 of "Tumitigil ang Mundo", the first single from their second album Be:Us, marked a new chapter in BGYO's music career. Over the next three months the group embarked on their first mall tour, "Best Time with BGYO Mall Tour"; took part in "TUGATOG: The Filipino Music Festival 2022"; participated in Nickelodeon's Bikini Bottom Bash as well as in the benefit concert "BE YOU: The World will Adjust"; appeared at Kumu is 4 U: A Birthday Concert; (Note: Alongside other P-pop groups and Kumu Streamers.) staged their first-ever Mindanao show, TNT Saya Fest sa Tuna Festival; (Note: The event was part of a month-long celebration of General Santos' 24th Tuna Festival.) took part in the Lazada 9.9 Megasale Super Show; (Note: The debut of the group in the show, with their opening and closing performances.) and performed "Tumitigil ang Mundo" on It's Showtime. On August 14 "Patuloy Lang ang Lipad" was released, followed the next day by the release of BGYO's official light stick, named "The Light".

In October, 2022 BGYO unveiled their second album Be:Us, with "Magnet" released on October 20 as the lead single and the album's key track being "PNGNP". Following these releases, the group participated in "EK's 27th Pre-Anniversary Concert: P-pop Day"; (Note: Alongside other P-pop groups Alamat, 1st.One, Dione, and SMS.) "TNT Saya Fest sa Zamboanga Hermosa"; "Mr. Music: The Hits of Jonathan Manalo"; (Note: The concert was the 20th anniversary of Jonathan Manalo in the Philippine music industry with over 30 artists performing.) and on "Hallyuween 2022", where they performed The Light, The Baddest, Kundiman, and Magnet. As part of their Be:Us campaign, the group embarked on a US promotional tour, which included a visit to TikTok Headquarters in Los Angeles, a performance on the Wish USA Bus, and a street performance at both Times Square and Union Square in New York City. On November 19 the group was featured on Myx Hits Different, and on November 25 "Tumitigil ang Mundo" was released as part of the An Inconvenient Love Original Soundtrack.

=== Further releases (2025–2026) ===
The group's self-titled album BGYO was released on March 13, 2025, featuring the single "Divine", and their Headlines EP was released on September 25, featuring the singles "All These Ladies" and the title track.

On June 4, 2026 the group released the EP On Demand, featuring the lead single "Fresh", which had been previously released on February 19, 2026.

BGYO performed their first solo concert on October 4, 2025 in the New Frontier Theater.

== Artistry ==
BGYO has cited K-pop groups such as BTS, Exo, Got7, and Wanna One as well as artists such as Shawn Mendes, Gary Valenciano, Erik Santos, and Regine Velasquez as their musical inspirations. In an interview with Myx Global, the group also cited Jabbawockeez as an influence, with Nate saying, "Jabbawockeez inspired me to get into music, and I would even copy how they would dance". Although inspired by such K-pop groups, BGYO emphasize the strength of their Filipino identity, as evident in their music, songwriting, and style.

BGYO's debut song "The Light" was genre-bending as it contained urban, electronic, and R&B elements, becoming popular among the younger generation for speaking about empowerment, hope, and self-love.

== Endorsements ==
BGYO have obtained several endorsement deals in various industries over their career, including becoming brand ambassadors for the Xiaomi Redmi Note 11 series and H&M. They were the first Filipino artists to be featured in H&M's "Music x ME" campaign, which aimed to promote up and coming OPM artists, and took part in the first-ever collaboration by H&M with the Filipino streetwear company "Don't Blame the Kids (DBTK)". (Note: The collection is part of the brands' collaboration campaign, "The World is My Home".) The group has also been introduced as the fresh faces of Mentos, voicing the brand's campaign jingle, and have also served as brand ambassadors for TNT, Chowking, and Sprite, with their voices in the campaign "Cool Ka Lang".

BGYO partnered with Viber to give fans an exclusive chance to connect with the group online through the "Backstage Pass Channel", and on March 19, 2021 the group signed with live-streaming platform Kumu to promote campaigns.

== Legal action ==
On June 19, 2024 BGYO filed cyberlibel and unjust vexation complaints against netizens who had been spreading false information in order to attack the group.

== Awards and nominations ==
=== International ===
Year	Award ceremony	Host country	Category	Nominated work	Result	Ref.
2021	Asian Academy Creative Awards	Singapore	Best Theme Song or Title Theme	He's Into Her	Finalist	

=== Local ===
Year	Award ceremony	Category	Nominated work	Result	Ref.
2020	6th PUSH Awards 2020	Push Music Personality of the Year	BGYO	Nominated	
2021	Asian Academy Creative Awards	Best Theme Song or Title Theme (Philippines)	He's Into Her	Won	
2021	34th AWIT Awards	People's Voice Favorite Group Artist	BGYO	Won	
2021	6th P-Pop Awards	P-Pop Boy Group of the Year	BGYO	Won	
2021	RAWR Awards 2021	Song of the Year	The Light	Nominated	
2021	RAWR Awards 2021	Favorite Group	BGYO	Nominated	
2021	RAWR Awards 2021	Favorite Performer	BGYO	Nominated	
2021	RAWR Awards 2021	Fan Club of the Year	ACEs	Nominated	
2021	7th Wish Music Awards	Wish Breakthrough Artist of the Year	BGYO	Nominated	
2021	7th Wish Music Awards	Wishclusive Pop Performance of the Year	The Light	Nominated	
2021	7th PUSH Awards 2021	Push Music Personality of the Year	BGYO	Won	
2021	Saludo Excellence Awards 2021	Best Male Group	BGYO	Won	
2022	Preview Creative 25: 2022	Most Promising Talent in Musician's Category	BGYO	Honoree	
2022	7th P-Pop Awards	P-Pop Boy Group of the Year	BGYO	Nominated	
2022	TikTok Awards Philippines 2022	P-Pop Group of the Year	BGYO	Won	
2022	35th AWIT Awards	Best Performance by a Group Recording Artist	Kundiman	Nominated	
2022	35th AWIT Awards	Best Performance by a New Group Recording Artist	The Light	Nominated	
2022	35th AWIT Awards	People's Voice Favorite Group Artist	BGYO	Won	
2022	35th AWIT Awards	People's Voice Breakthrough Artist	BGYO	Nominated	
2022	35th AWIT Awards	People's Voice Favorite Song	He's Into Her	Nominated	
2022	2nd Diamond Excellence Awards	Outstanding Boy Group of the Year	BGYO	Won	
2022	RAWR Awards 2022	Song of the Year	Tumitigil Ang Mundo	Nominated	
2022	RAWR Awards 2022	Favorite Group	BGYO	Nominated	
2022	RAWR Awards 2022	Favorite Performer	BGYO	Nominated	
2022	RAWR Awards 2022	Fan Club of the Year	ACEs	Nominated	
2022	8th Wish Music Awards	Wish Pop Song of the Year	Tumitigil Ang Mundo	Nominated	
2022	Spotify Wrapped 2022	Top RADAR Philippines Artists 2022	BGYO	Honoree	

=== Listicles ===
Name of publisher, name of listicle, year listed, and placement result
Publisher	Listicle	Year	Result	Ref.
Billboard Philippines	P-pop Rising Class	2025	Placed	

== See also ==
- BGYO discography
- BGYO videography
- List of BGYO live performances
- 2021 in Philippine music
- 2022 in Philippine music
- 2023 in Philippine music
