= One Life =

One Life may refer to:

== Films and television ==
- One Life (1958 film), French drama about an unhappy marriage in the 19th century, based on the Maupassant story
- One Life (2011 film), BBC wildlife documentary by Michael Gunton and Martha Holmes
- One Life (2016 film), Franco-Belgian drama about a woman's unhappy marriage, based on the Maupassant story
- One Life (2023 film), a British biographical film about Sir Nicholas Winton

== Music ==
=== Albums ===
- One Life (33Miles album), 2008
- One Life (Johnny Clegg album), 2006
- One Life (Mai Kuraki album), 2008
- One Life (Elena Paparizou album), 2014

=== Songs ===
- "1 Life" (Xandee song), the Belgian entry in the Eurovision Song Contest 2004 performed by Xandee
- "One Life" (Glen Vella song), the Maltese entrant of the Eurovision Song Contest 2011
- "One Life" (Hedley song), a 2012 single by Hedley
- "One Life" (Madcon song), a 2013 single by Norwegian hip hop duo Madcon
- "One Life" (No Angels song), a 2009 single by German pop band No Angels
- "One Life" (The Pillows song), a 1997 single by The Pillows
- "One Life", song by Christine Campbell 1963
- "One Life", song by Glen Goldsmith 1989
- "One Life", song by James Morrison from his album The Awakening, 2011
- "One Life", song by Justin Bieber from his album Journals, 2013
- "One Life", song by Laid Back 1985
- "One Life", song by Robert Goulet 1961
- "One Life", song on Alter Bridge's 2019 album Walk the Sky
- "One Life", song by Ed Sheeran in the tour edition of his 2021 album = (and the 2019 film Yesterday)
