= Be The Light: The BGYO Launch =

Online concert for BGYO

- Concert by BGYO
- Promotional poster
- Start date: January 29, 2021
- End date: January 29, 2021

BGYO concert chronology
- Be The Light: The BGYO Launch (2021); One Dream: The Bini and BGYO Concert (2021)

Be The Light: The BGYO Launch was the official media launch by the P-Pop boy group, BGYO presented by Star Magic and "Star Hunt Academy". It was supported by the world premiere of the band's most anticipated debut single The Light. The event was held online on 29 January 2021, streamed via KTX and was virtually attended by their respective families, Star Hunt Academy management and team, Filipino and Korean coaches, MU Doctor(뮤닥터) heads, ABS-CBN heads, fans (the SHAmily as they called it before the official fandom name reveal held on 9 April 2021, as ACEs) and some members of the press and bloggers.

== Background ==
The online concert runs for a total of one hour and fifty-one minutes, representing their mission to empower and motivate youths across the world while simultaneously lifting up the world of P-pop, BGYO stands for "Becoming The Change, Going Further, You and I showing the world what it means to be, Originally Filipino".

The event started with Akira Morishita (Akira), JL Toreliza (JL), Mikki Claver Jr.(Mikki), Nathaniel Porcalla (Nate), and Angelo Troy Rivera (Gelo) introducing themselves through snippets of their childhoods, their days as Star Hunt Academy trainees, and the lessons they have learned, then coming out to the stage one-by-one.

It was hosted by AI Dela Cruz and MJ Felipe. BGYO's Filipino and Korean mentors virtually relay their congratulatory greetings as they finally had their debut, as follows: vocal coach Kitchy Molina, Teacher Iron, Teacher Jun, Teacher Chan, Teacher Yong, Mr. Yoon, and Ms. Stella.

Some of the Kapamilya stars extended their welcome and wishes to BGYO, namely: Vice Ganda, Vhong Navarro, Kim Chiu, Inigo Pascual, Gary Valenciano and P-pop girl group BINI.

BGYO fans were also delighted with the band members solo performances, the behind the scenes of the music video and a sneak live performance of their debut single "The Light". A mini press conference were facilitated as well, along with the members of the press locally and overseas, right after the interaction with the virtual fans.

== Setlist ==
1. Band Members Introduction
2. Introductory Message from the event hosts MJ Felipe and AI Dela Cruz
3. Reliving the BGYO's journey as trainees in Star Hunt Academy
4. Catching Up Interview with BGYO and Congratulatory Messages from Filipino and Korean Mentors, MU Doctor(뮤닥터) heads and some of the Kapamilya Stars
5. Individual Performances:
  1. Nate performed the dance choreography of the song "Full Moon Youth" by Moophs artist Yuzon
  2. Akira showed his vocal range and unique style on his performance, as he serenade the viewers of the Pinoy Big Brother: Connect's theme song “Bagong Simula” by Jem Macatuno
  3. Gelo surprised the viewers with his dancing and rapping skills, as he performed “Only Gonna Love You” by Kyla and REQ
  4. JL once again proved that he is a Mapanakit (as the fans called him) in his cover of Moira Dela Torre’s “Paubaya”
  5. Mikki showcased his rapping skills as he performed his original composition “Go Higher” which Epidemic Music provided the beats
6. Mini press conference with the members of the press from local and overseas
7. Fan Interaction
8. The Light music video - Behind The Scenes
9. Debut Single Sneak Performance:
  1. The Light
10. Message and words of gratitude from the Head of ABS CBN Entertainment Production and Star Magic, Laurenti Dyogi
11. The world premiere of The Light's music video and the track.
12. BGYO's Words of Gratitude to all the people behind their journey
13. Fan Project from SHAmily, chronicling the BGYO's journey accompanied by the song of 33Miles entitled "Worth The Wait".
14. Words of Gratitude for the event partners and closing remarks.

== Critical reception ==
Sherilyn Ramon of The Philippine Times shared in her article "I quickly became a fan after seeing their performances online. They are deserving of our support, not only because they’re our kababayan but also because they really are worthy of it."

John Bueno of kumagcow.com noted that "I'm telling you, they definitely have good reason to put these guys together, and if they go international, I wouldn't be surprised if a lot of girls would go gaga over them."

== Online, cable and free TV release ==
On 7 February 2021, "Be The Light: The BGYO Launch" aired in the Philippines via A2Z Channel 11, Kapamilya Channel, Kapamilya Online Live and premiered worldwide via iWantTFC.

On 13 February 2021, "Be The Light: The BGYO Launch" re-broadcast in the United States of America, in Europe, in the Middle East and in Guam by Myx TV.
