= John D. Olivas =

American astronaut and engineer (born 1966)

John Olivas
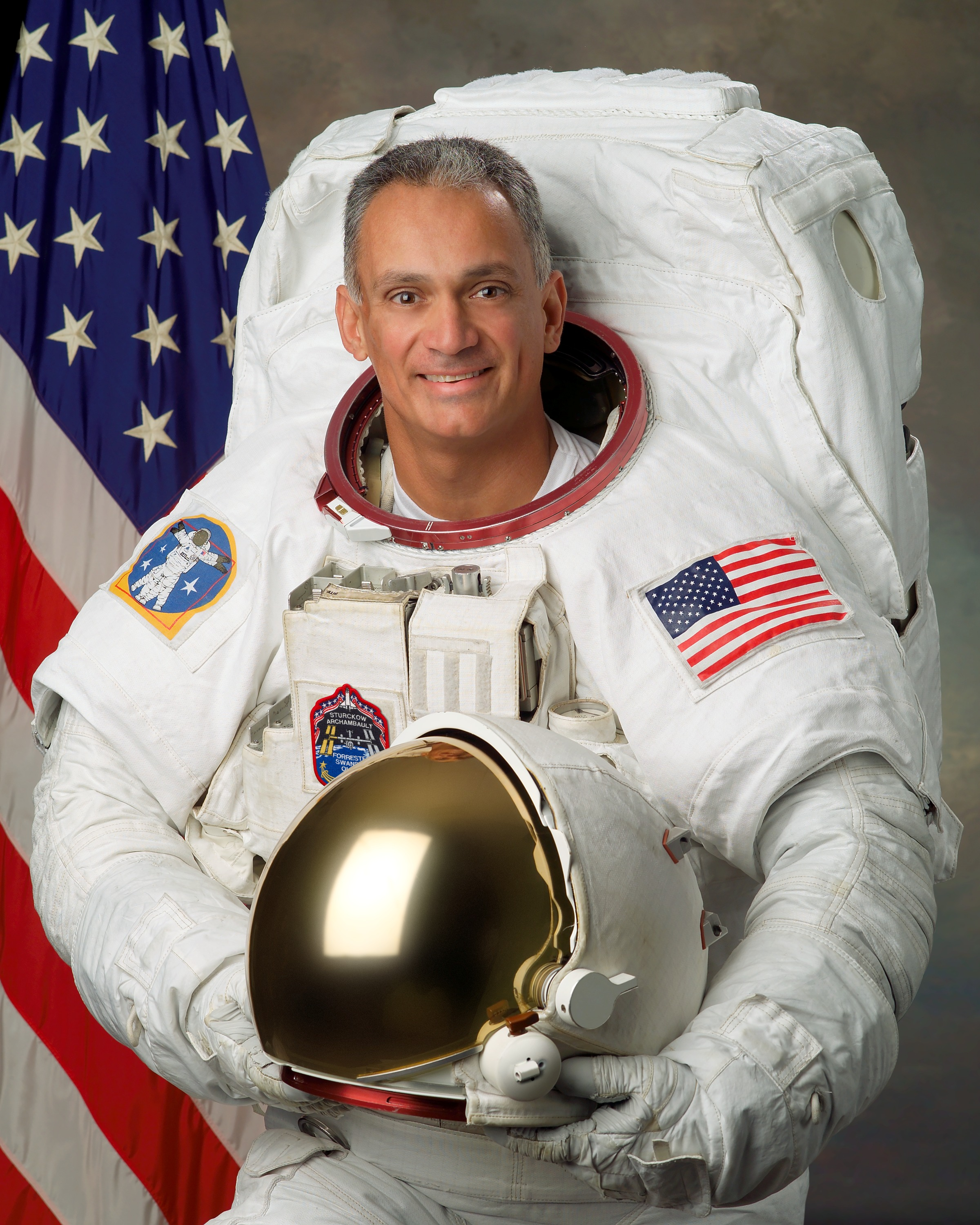
- Born: John Daniel Olivas; May 25, 1966 (age 60); Los Angeles, California, U.S.
- Education: University of Texas at El Paso (BS); University of Houston (MS); Rice University (PhD)
- Space career

NASA astronaut
- Time in space: 27d 17h 5m
- Selection: NASA Group 17 (1998)
- Total EVAs: 5
- Total EVA time: 34h, 28m
- Mission: STS-117; STS-128
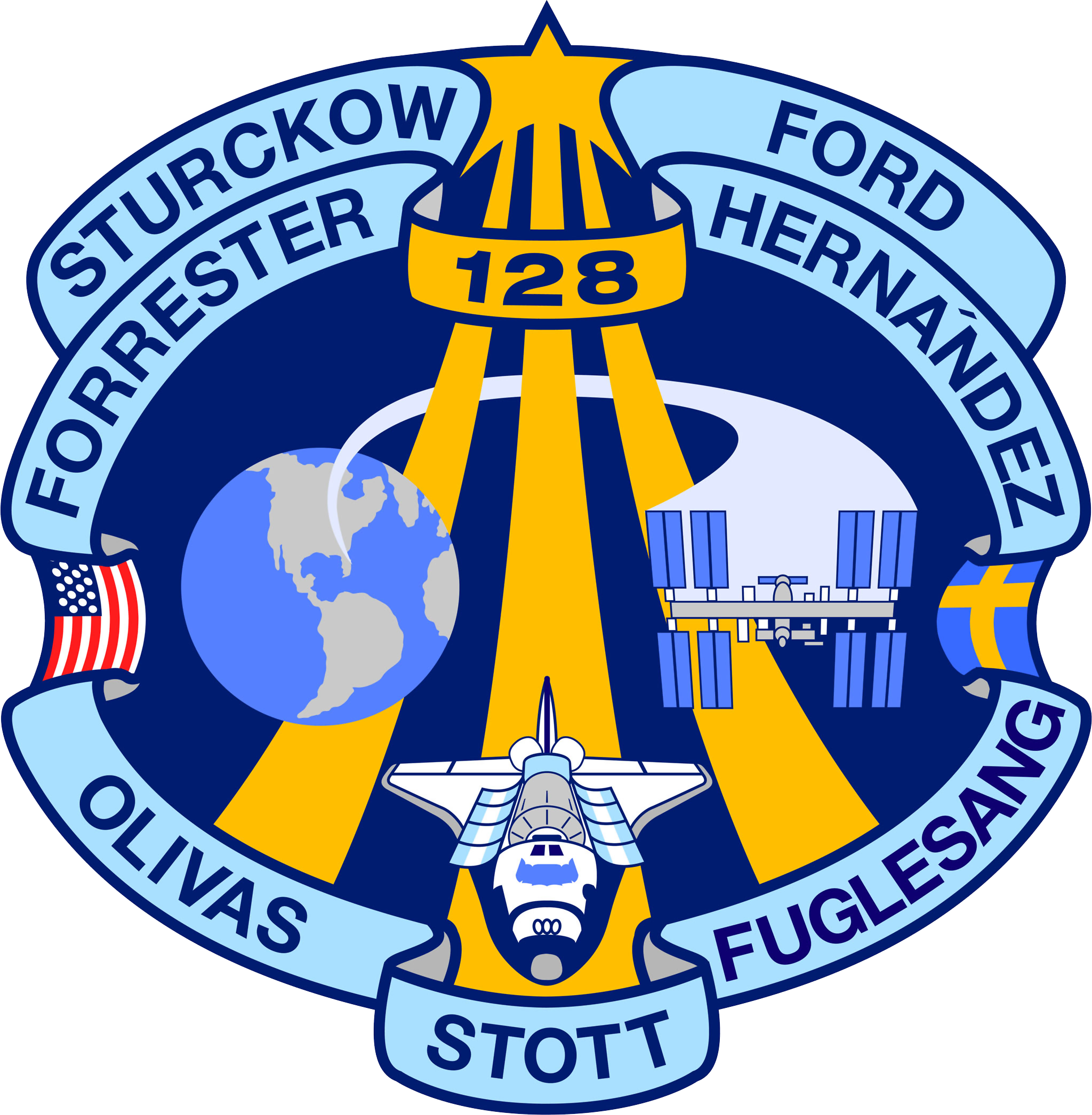
- Mission insignia
- Scientific career
- Fields: Materials science
- Thesis: Surface Study of Process Contamination of Plasma Spray Metal Deposition Process (1996)
- Doctoral advisor: Enrique Barrera

John Daniel "Danny" Olivas (born May 25, 1966 in North Hollywood, California) is an American engineer and a former NASA astronaut. Olivas has flown on two space shuttle missions, STS-117 and STS-128, received two NASA Space Flight Medals, and has been in over 5 spacewalks throughout his career. He performed EVAs on both missions, totaling 34hrs 28min.

In 2013, Olivas joined the University of Texas at El Paso as Director of the Center for the Advancement of Space Safety and Mission Assurance Research and will oversee space initiatives on campus.

Olivas and his wife, Marie, launched the Space for Everyone Foundation in 2020 to help immigrant families with their health and well-being.

== Personal life ==
Born in North Hollywood, California, raised in El Paso, Texas, received a Bachelor of Science degree in mechanical engineering from the University of Texas at El Paso in 1989, a Master of Science degree in mechanical engineering from the University of Houston in 1993, and a Ph.D. in mechanical engineering and materials science from Rice University in 1996. Olivas is a descendant of immigrants from the state of Chihuahua in Mexico. In 2006, Olivas was given the highest honor an alumni can receive by being named UTEP's Distinguished Alumni. In 2013 Olivas joined the University of Texas at El Paso as Director of the Center for the Advancement of Space Safety and Mission Assurance Research and will oversee space initiatives on campus. In 2019, he appeared as a contestant on Nickelodeon's revival of Are You Smarter than a 5th Grader?.

== NASA career ==
NASA selected Olivas as an astronaut candidate in 1998. His astronaut training included orientation briefings and tours, numerous scientific and technical briefings, intensive instruction in Shuttle and International Space Station systems, physiological training and ground school to prepare for T-38 flight training, as well as learning water and wilderness survival techniques. From 1999 to 2002, he was assigned technical responsibilities within the Robotics Branch as lead for the Special Purpose Dexterous Manipulator Robot and the Mobile Transporter. From 2002 to 2005 he was assigned to the EVA Branch and supported the research effort focused on developing materials, tools and techniques to perform on-orbit shuttle repair. In July 2002, Olivas served as an aquanaut during the NEEMO 3 mission aboard the Aquarius underwater laboratory. In April 2005, he was a crew member on the NEEMO 8 mission. In 2006, Olivas served as lead of the Hardware Integration Section of the Space Station Branch, responsible for ensuring proper configuration and integration of future station modules and visiting vehicles.

== Spaceflight experience ==
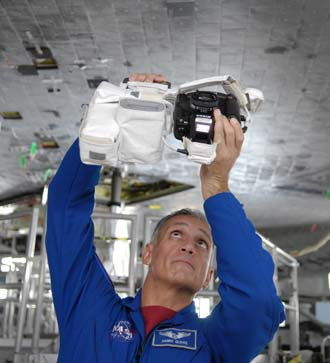
John D. Olivas checking equipment during crew equipment interface test for STS-117

=== STS-117 ===
STS-117 Atlantis (June 8–22, 2007) was the 118th Shuttle mission and the 21st mission to visit the International Space Station, delivering the second starboard truss segment, the third set of U.S. solar arrays, batteries and associated equipment. The mission also entailed the first ever on-orbit EVA repair to the Space Shuttle, Atlantis. During two spacewalks, Olivas accumulated 14 hours and 13 mins of EVA experience. The mission also delivered and returned with an ISS expedition crew member. STS-117 returned to land at Edwards Air Force Base, California, having traveled more than 5.8 million miles in 13 days, 20 hours and 20 minutes.

=== STS-128 ===
Olivas served as a mission specialist on space shuttle Discovery on the STS-128 mission, which launched on August 28, 2009. Discovery carried the Multi-Purpose Logistics Module filled with science and storage racks to the ISS. The mission included three spacewalks to remove and replace a materials processing experiment outside ESA's Columbus module and return an empty ammonia tank assembly.

== See also ==
- List of Hispanic astronauts
