= 33Miles (album) =

Studio album by 33Miles
- Released: April 10, 2007
- Genre: Christian rock; Pop
- Length: 43:27
- Label: INO
- Producer: Nathan Nockels; Sam Mizell

33Miles chronology
33Miles (2007)	One Life (2008)

Professional ratings
Review scores
Source	Rating
Jesus Freak Hideout	3/5 stars

33Miles is the self-titled debut studio album from Christian rock band 33Miles. It was released on April 10, 2007 on INO Records.

== Track listing ==
No.	Title	Writer(s)	Length
1.	"What Could Be Better"	Jason Barton, Scott Davis, Sam Mizell	4:05
2.	"Come With Me"	Mizell	3:07
3.	"Stand Amazed"	Mizell	3:54
4.	"There Is A God"	Mizell, Tony Wood	4:01
5.	"Hold On"	Jess Cates, Wendy Wills	4:15
6.	"Thank You"	Barton, Mizell, Matthew West	3:41
7.	"I Can't Deny"	Barton, Chris Lockwood, Mizell, Collin Stoddard	3:59
8.	"Salvation Has a Name"	Jim Bryson, Nathan Cochran, Barry Graul, Bart Millard, Mizell, Mike Scheuchzer, Robby Shaffer	4:17
9.	"This Is Now"	Mizell, Mike Payne	3:48
10.	"The Best Man"	Barton, Jeremy Bose, Lockwood, Mizell	4:28
11.	"When I Get Where I'm Going"	Rivers Rutherford, George Teren	3:48
Total length:			43:23

A bonus disc was available for anyone who bought the album in advance.

Bonus Disc tracks
No.	Title	Length
1.	"There Is a God" (Live)
2.	"What Could Be Better" (Acoustic)
3.	"Stand Amazed" (Acoustic)
4.	"Christmas Medley"	3:24

== Chart positions ==
The album reached No. 16 on the Top Christian Albums chart, and No. 8 on the Top Heatseekers chart.
