= STS-128 =

2009 American crewed spaceflight to the ISS

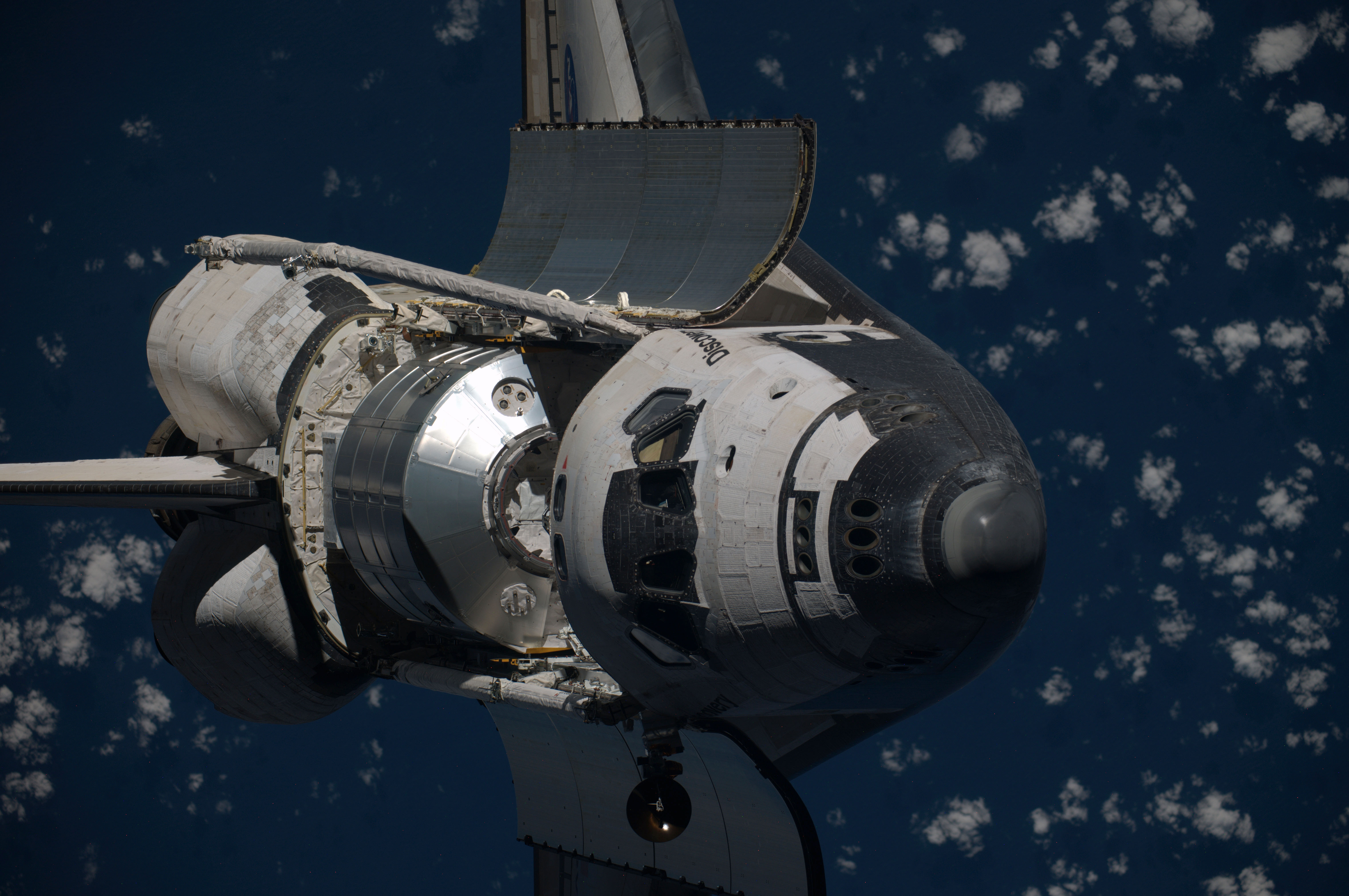
- Discovery approaches the ISS with Leonardo in its payload bay
- Names: Space Transportation System-128
- Mission type: ISS assembly
- Operator: NASA
- COSPAR ID: 2009-045A
- SATCAT no.: 35811
- Mission duration: 13 days, 20 hours, 54 minutes, 55 seconds
- Distance travelled: 9,262,217 kilometres (5,755,275 mi)
- Orbits completed: 219

Spacecraft properties
- Spacecraft: Space Shuttle Discovery
- Launch mass: 121,422 kilograms (267,689 lb)

Crew
- Crew size: 7
- Members: Frederick W. Sturckow; Kevin A. Ford; Patrick G. Forrester; José M. Hernández; John D. Olivas; Christer Fuglesang
- Launching: Nicole Stott
- Landing: Timothy Kopra

Start of mission
- Launch date: August 29, 2009, 03:59 UTC
- Launch site: Kennedy, LC-39A

End of mission
- Landing date: September 12, 2009, 00:53 UTC
- Landing site: Edwards, Runway 22

Orbital parameters
- Reference system: Geocentric
- Regime: Low Earth
- Perigee altitude: 219 kilometres (136 mi)
- Apogee altitude: 264 kilometres (164 mi)
- Inclination: 51.6 degrees
- Period: 89.33 minutes
- Epoch: August 29, 2009

Docking with ISS
- Docking port: PMA-2 (Harmony forward)
- Docking date: August 31, 2009 00:54 UTC
- Undocking date: September 8, 2009 19:26 UTC
- Time docked: 8 days, 18 hours, 32 minutes
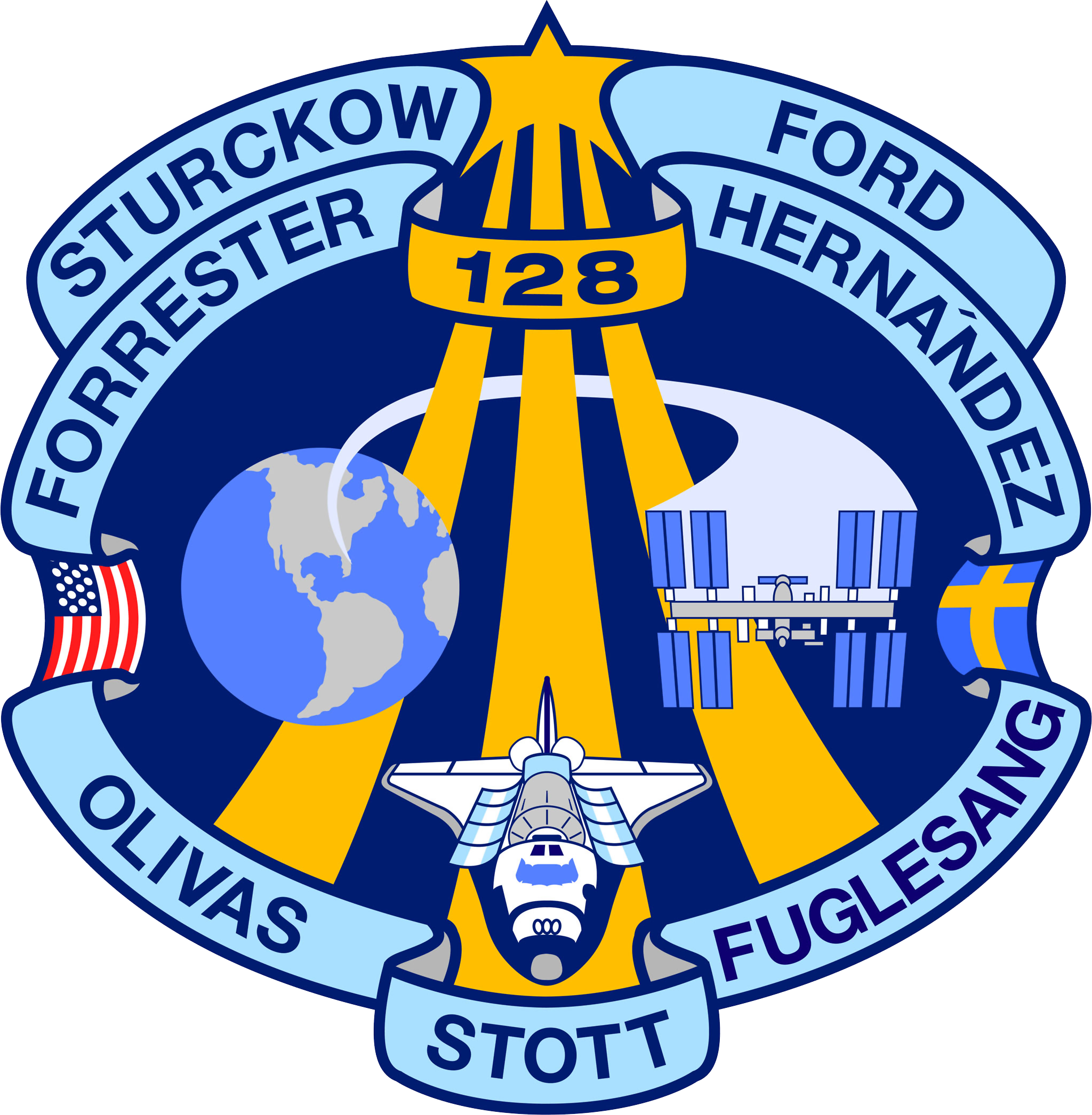
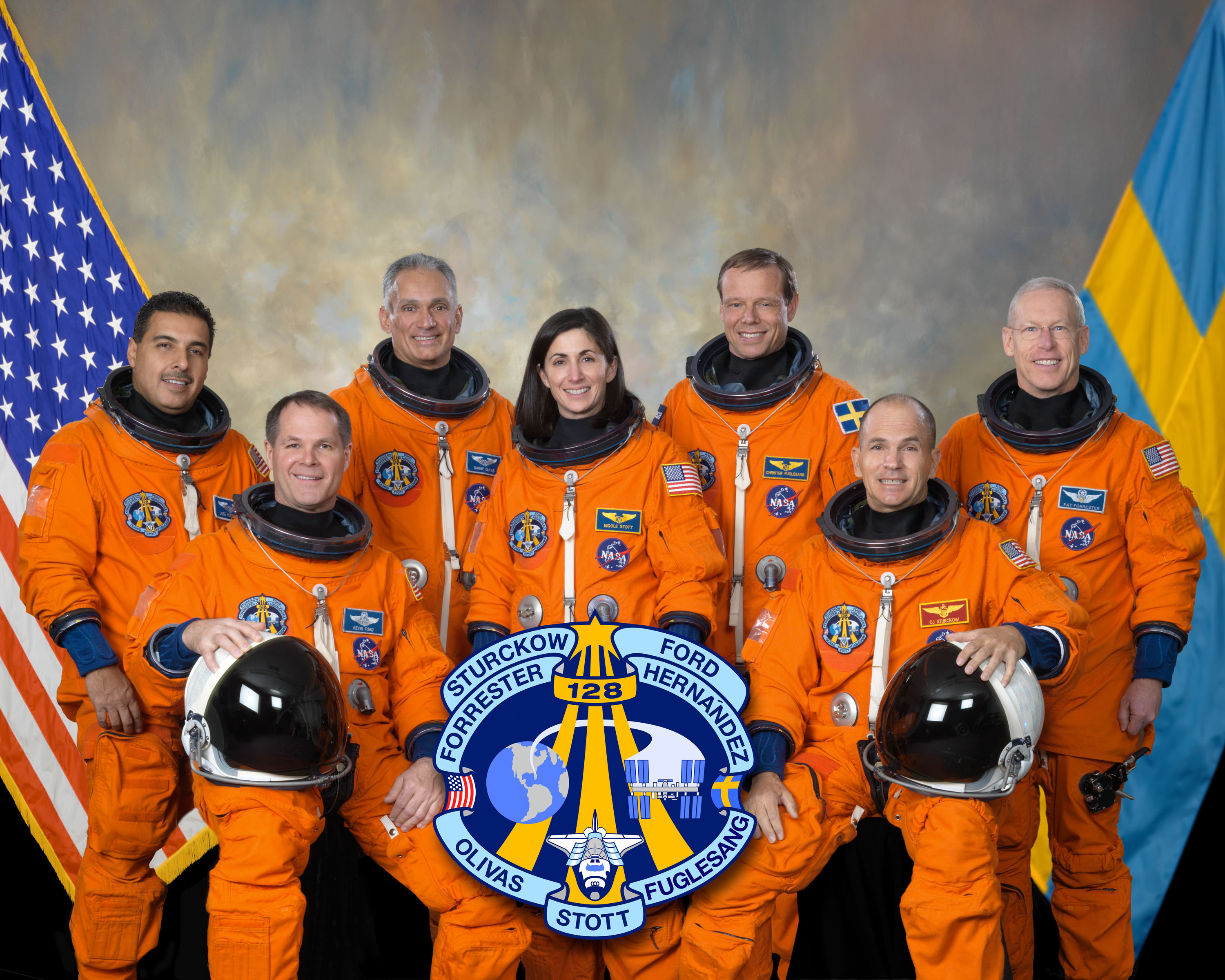
- Seated (l–r) Ford and Sturckow. Standing (l–r) are Hernández, Olivas, Stott, Fuglesang and Forrester. Space Shuttle program

STS-128 (ISS assembly flight 17A) was a NASA Space Shuttle mission to the International Space Station (ISS) that launched on August 28, 2009. Space Shuttle Discovery carried the Multi-Purpose Logistics Module Leonardo as its primary payload. It was Discovery's 37th flight. Leonardo contained a collection of experiments for studying the physics and chemistry of microgravity. Three spacewalks were carried out during the mission, which removed and replaced a materials processing experiment outside ESA's Columbus module, and returned an empty ammonia tank assembly.

The mission's first launch attempt was delayed due to weather concerns, including multiple weather violations in NASA's launch rules, beginning over two hours before the scheduled launch. The second launch attempt, scheduled for August 26, 2009, at 01:10:22 EDT, was called off the previous evening due to an anomaly in one of the orbiter's fuel valves. The launch finally took place on August 28, 2009, at 23:59 EDT. Discovery landed on September 11, 2009, at Edwards Air Force Base, which was the last landing of a shuttle to occur at the California site.

== Crew ==
Position	Launching astronaut	Landing astronaut
Commander	(United States) Frederick W. Sturckow; Fourth (last NASA) spaceflight	
Pilot	(United States) Kevin A. Ford; First spaceflight	
Mission Specialist 1	(United States) Patrick G. Forrester; Third and last spaceflight	
Mission Specialist 2 Flight Engineer	(United States) José M. Hernández; Only spaceflight	
Mission Specialist 3	(United States) John D. Olivas; Second and last spaceflight	
Mission Specialist 4	(Sweden) Christer Fuglesang, ESA; Second and last spaceflight	
Mission Specialist 5	(United States) Nicole Stott; Expedition 20; First spaceflight	(United States) Timothy Kopra; Expedition 20; First spaceflight
Crew notes Nicole Stott was originally scheduled to return aboard Soyuz TMA-15, but a change in the flight plan was made due to the possible flight delays in future shuttle missions, which could have extended Canadian astronaut Robert Thirsk's mission beyond the six-month duration preferred for station crew members. STS-128 was the final Space Shuttle flight used for ISS crew rotation, with Nicole Stott replacing Tim Kopra. Stott returned on STS-129, but that flight did not bring her replacement. The mission of Christer Fuglesang was named Alissé by the European Space Agency. The name was proposed by Jürgen Modlich from Baierbrunn, Germany. The name refers to the 15th-century explorers who used the trade winds to follow Christopher Columbus across the oceans to the New World. STS-128 also marked the first time two Hispanic Americans were on the same crew. John "Danny" Olivas of El Paso, Texas, made his second trip into space, and José M. Hernández of Stockton, California, made his first. Both are of Mexican heritage.

=== Crew seat assignments ===
Seat	Launch	Landing	Seats 1–4 are on the flight deck. Seats 5–7 are on the mid-deck.
1	Sturckow		Seats 1–4 are on the flight deck. Seats 5–7 are on the mid-deck.
2	Ford		Seats 1–4 are on the flight deck. Seats 5–7 are on the mid-deck.
3	Forrester		Seats 1–4 are on the flight deck. Seats 5–7 are on the mid-deck.
4	Hernandez		Seats 1–4 are on the flight deck. Seats 5–7 are on the mid-deck.
5	Olivas		Seats 1–4 are on the flight deck. Seats 5–7 are on the mid-deck.
6	Fuglesang		Seats 1–4 are on the flight deck. Seats 5–7 are on the mid-deck.
7	Stott	Kopra	Seats 1–4 are on the flight deck. Seats 5–7 are on the mid-deck.

== Mission payload ==
Location	Cargo	Mass
Bays 1–2	Orbiter Docking System; EMU 3009 / EMU 3015	1,800 kilograms (4,000 lb); ~260 kilograms (570 lb)
Bay 3P	Shuttle Power; Distribution Unit (SPDU)	~17 kilograms (37 lb)
Bay 4P	APC/MISSE Carrier	57 kilograms (126 lb)
Bay 5P	APC/MISSE Carrier	57 kilograms (126 lb)
Bay 7S	ROEU umbilical	~79 kilograms (174 lb)
Bays 7–12	Leonardo (MPLM FM-1)	12,131 kilograms (26,744 lb)
Bay 13	Lightweight MPESS Carrier (LMC)	1,780 kilograms (3,920 lb)
Starboard Sill	Orbiter Boom Sensor System	~382 kilograms (842 lb)
Port Sill	Canadarm	410 kilograms (900 lb)
	Total:	16,973 kilograms (37,419 lb)

=== Multi-Purpose Logistics Module (MPLM) Leonardo ===
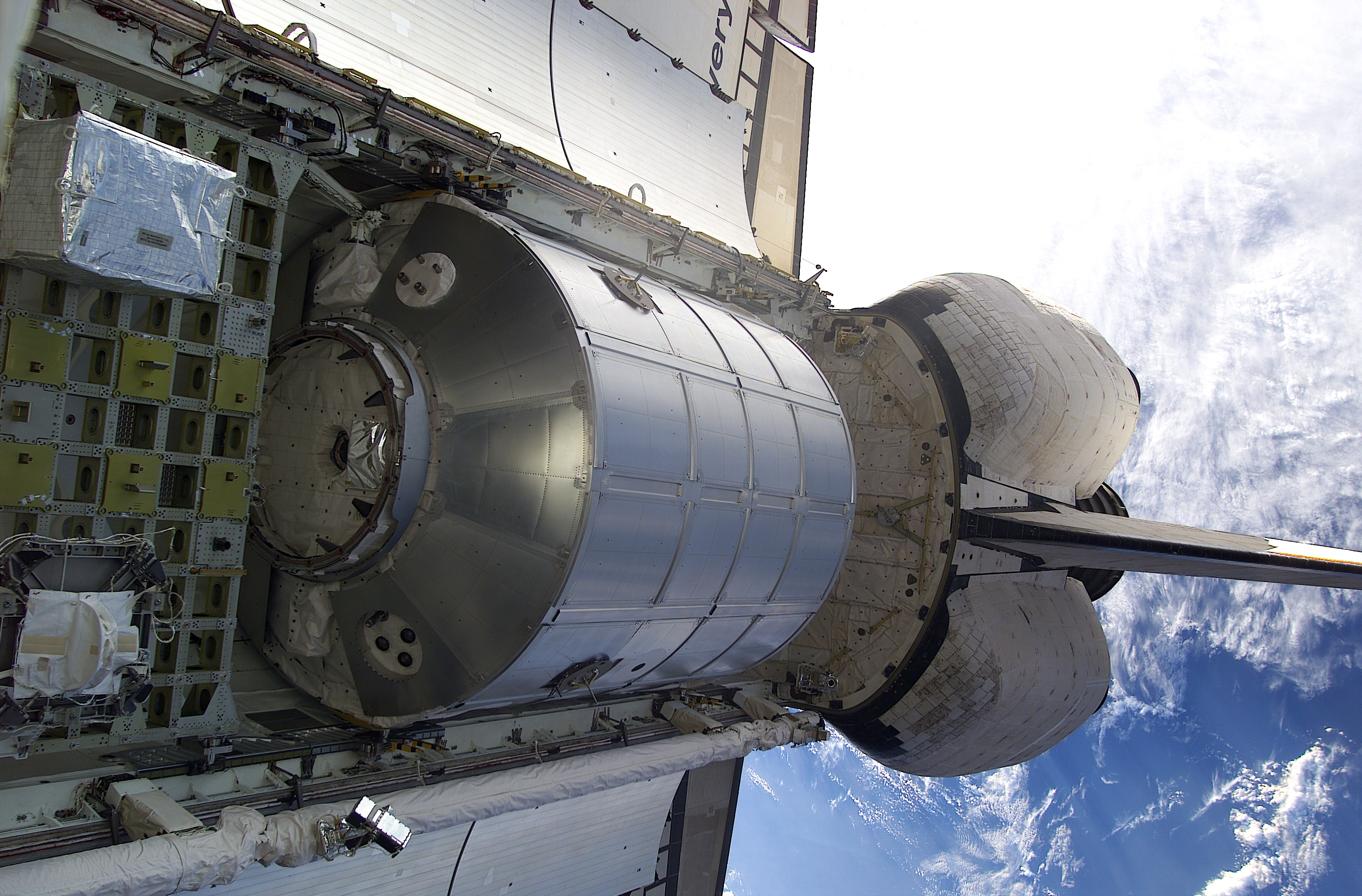
Leonardo, as flown on STS-102

The primary payload of STS-128 was the Multi-Purpose Logistics Module Leonardo to assist with establishing a six-man crew capacity by bringing extra supplies and equipment to the station. The Multi-Purpose Logistics Module contained three racks for life support, a crew quarter to be installed in Kibo, a new treadmill (COLBERT) that will temporarily be placed in Node 2 and later in Node 3, and an Air Revitalization System (ARS) that will temporarily be placed in Kibo and later in Node 3.

Leonardo Specifications

- Length: 21 feet (6.4 m)
- Diameter: 15 feet (4.6 m)
- Payload Mass (launch): 27,510 pounds (12,480 kg)
- Payload Mass (return): 16,268 pounds (7,379 kg)
- Empty Weight: 9,810 pounds (4,450 kg)

=== Lightweight Multi-Purpose Carrier (LMC) ===
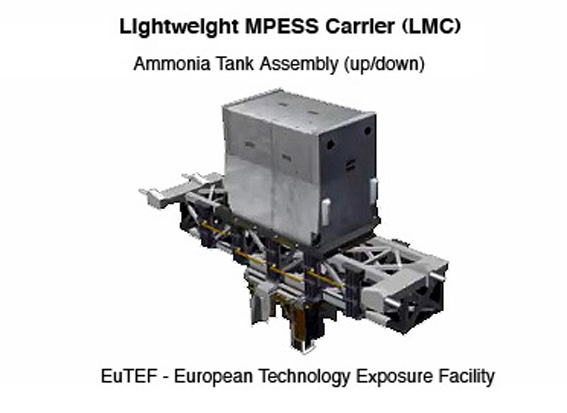
LMC with ATA and EuTEF STS-128

The shuttle carried a Lightweight Multi-Purpose Experiment Support Structure Carrier (LMC) with Ammonia Tank Assembly (ATA). The new ammonia tank replaced an empty tank during an EVA.

=== TriDAR ===
The shuttle flew the first test flight of the TriDAR, a 3D dual-sensing laser camera, intended for potential use as an autonomous rendezvous and docking sensor. The TriDAR successfully tracked the ISS position and orientation from the shuttle during docking operations.

=== Other science packages ===
It also contained three racks dedicated to science, FIR (Fluids Integrated Rack) and the first Materials Science Research Rack (MSRR-1) to be placed in Destiny and MELFI-2 (Minus Eighty Laboratory Freezer for ISS) to be placed in Kibo. The FIR enabled detailed study of how liquids behave in microgravity, a crucial detail for many chemical reactions. One experiment, for instance, examined how mixtures known as colloids behave without being stirred by sedimentation and convection. Another using the Light Microscopy Module (LMM) will examine how an ideal heat pipe works without the distortions of gravity.

== Mission experiments ==
The STS-128 mission (as did STS-125 and STS-127) took part in crew seat vibration tests designed to help engineers on the ground understand how astronauts experience launch. They will use the information to help design the crew seats that will be used in future NASA spacecraft.

STS-128 repeated the Boundary Layer Transition (BLT) Detailed Test Objective (DTO) experiment that was done by the same shuttle during STS-119. In this experiment, one of the thermal protection systems was raised to create a boundary layer transition in which the air flow becomes turbulent beyond a certain speed. During STS-119 the tile was raised 0.25 inches (6.4 mm) above the others, tripping the flow at Mach 15 during reentry. In the modification being done, the tile has been raised 0.35 inches (8.9 mm) to trip at Mach 18 producing more heat.

Discovery undertook the testing of a catalytic coating which was meant to be used by the Orion spacecraft. Two TPS tiles located in the protuberance downstream from the BLT tile had been fully coated with the catalytic material in order to understand the entry heating performance. The tiles were instrumented to collect a wide variety of data.

== Mission milestones ==
The mission marked:

- 159th NASA crewed space flight
- 128th Space Shuttle mission since STS-1
- 37th flight of Discovery
- 30th shuttle mission to the ISS
- 103rd post-Challenger mission
- 15th post-Columbia mission
- 32nd shuttle night launch
- NASA's first Space Shuttle launch to take place during two calendar days
- 25th anniversary of Discovery's first flight, STS-41-D (August 30, 1984)

== Shuttle processing ==
Discovery rolled out from the Orbiter Processing Facility to the Vehicle Assembly Building after the external tank was cleared for use and was mated with it. The foam insulation on the tank underwent stringent pull tests after the foam liberated and hit the orbiter during STS-127. The STS-128's tank initially exhibited no concerns while the STS-127 case was determined to be a one-off case due to surface contamination prior to foam application.

The main change from previous missions is the change of the Ground Umbilical Carrier Plate (GUCP) vent housing. The quick release vents exhibited leaks during STS-119 and STS-127, which were determined to be due to a misalignment in the vent. This led to the one part rigid seal in the external tank being replaced with a two part flexible seal.

Discovery later rolled out from the VAB to Launch Complex 39A on August 4, 2009, in a slow drive on the top of the Crawler-transporter. The 3.4-mile (5.5 km) rollout began at 02:07 EDT, and ended with the launch platform secured in place at about 13:50 EDT. The move took longer than expected due to adverse weather conditions, which included lightning warnings. The crawler also had to pause occasionally so mud could be removed from its treads and bearings. Technicians then quickly prepared the shuttle to host the crew's countdown dress rehearsal known as the Terminal Countdown Demonstration Test (TCDT). Discovery's seven astronauts flew to Kennedy on August 5, 2009, for the training activity which concludes later in the week with a complete practice countdown, minus liftoff, involving the crew and the launch team. Meanwhile, in an unprecedented operation, modifications were made to the left Solid rocket booster on the pad. The modifications involved replacement of a check valve filter assembly in the booster which was found to have broken. In a potentially delaying factor, in depth testing of the external tank with X-ray revealed voids in the foam which might have formed during the injection molding of the foam. This has also been decided as a suspect factor in the foam shedding during STS-127. The air in the voids could have expanded due to the high temperatures generated during ascent thus breaking the foam. The reviews considered a rollback as an option since the defect could not be set right in the pad. Later, the tank was cleared for launch as is without any additional inspections.

=== Launch attempts ===
The first launch attempt was delayed by 24 hours due to weather concerns, including multiple weather violations in NASA's launch rules beginning over 2 hours before the scheduled launch. During the second attempt on Wednesday morning, a problem with a LH2 fill-and-drain fuel valve inside Discovery's aft compartment led to another scrubbing. The problem arose when sensors did not detect the closure of the valve when commanded to do so. The issue was thought to be with the sensors rather than the valve itself. After inerting the orbiter's tank, which involved draining it, tests were conducted on the valves. Despite the valves working normally, another delay was called for to have more confidence in the system, and to give the console operators who performed the test some rest. The launch team evaluated the issue, passing on a possible launch window on August 27, 2009, at 01:10 EDT. The launch was delayed until 23:59 EDT, August 28, 2009, to allow the engineers to be fully satisfied with the vehicle. Later the mission was cleared for launch which involved a flight rule waiver for cycling the valve and a discussion to analyze the test failure of an Ares-1 booster that was similar to the SRBs used for the mission. NASA feared another delay when storms formed near the Kennedy Space Center on August 28, 2009, but the weather cleared in time for a successful launch of Discovery at 23:59 EDT.

Attempt	Planned	Result	Turnaround	Reason	Decision point	Weather go (%)	Notes
1	25 Aug 2009, 1:36:05 am	Scrubbed	—	Weather	25 Aug 2009, 1:25 am (T−9:00 hold)	80%	Precipitation and lightning in launch and landing area
2	26 Aug 2009, 1:10:01 am	Scrubbed	0 days 23 hours 34 minutes	Technical	25 Aug 2009, 5:52 pm	70%	Failure indicator on LH2 inboard fill and drain valve.
3	28 Aug 2009, 12:22:09 am	Scrubbed	1 day 23 hours 12 minutes		27 Aug 2009, 12:15 pm		Additional time needed for engineers to analyze the LH2 inboard fill and drain valve.
4	28 Aug 2009, 11:59:37 pm	Success	0 days 23 hours 37 minutes			60%; later 80%	

== Mission timeline ==
=== August 28 (Flight Day 1 – Launch) ===
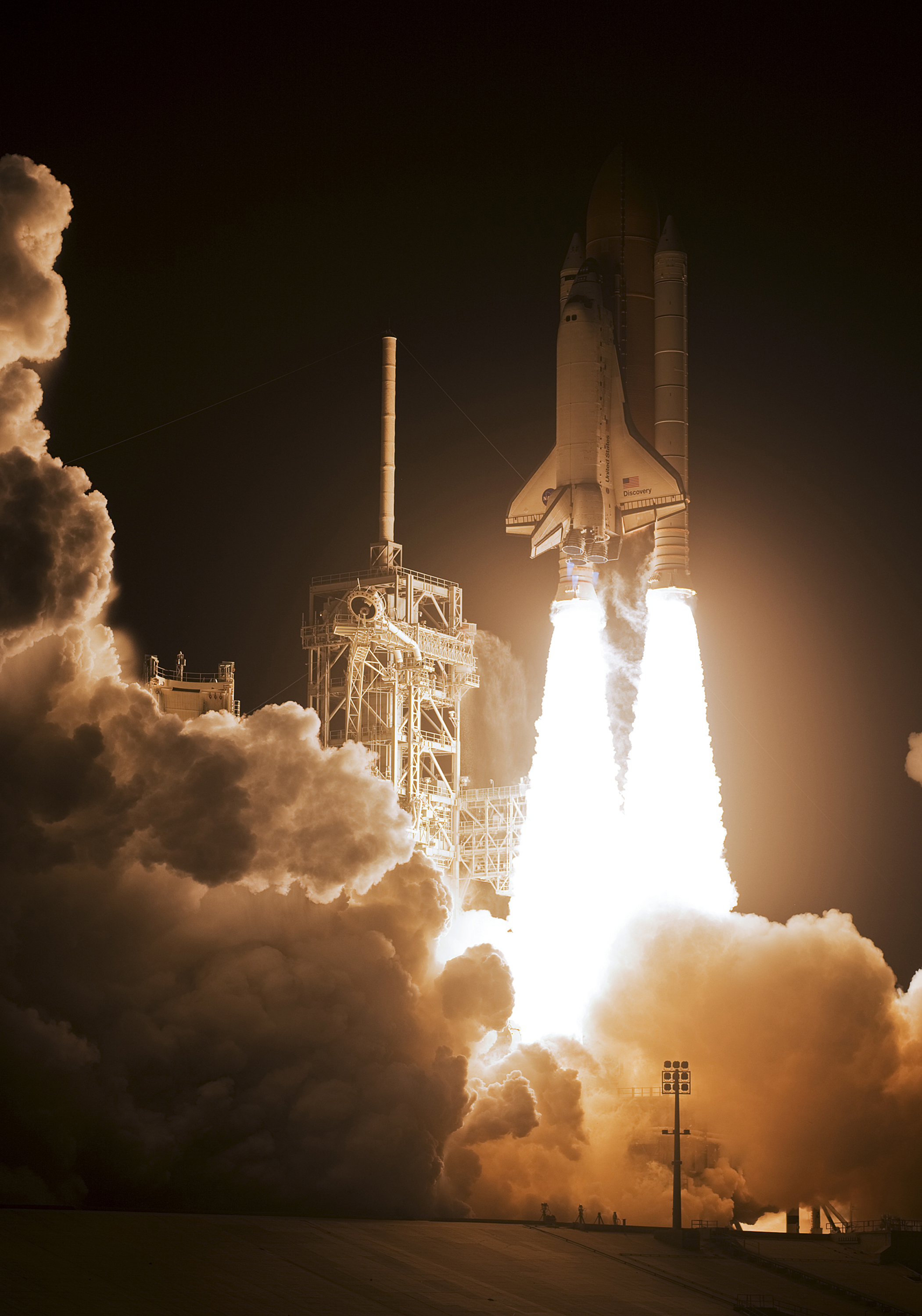
Space Shuttle Discovery launches from Kennedy Space Center, August 28, 2009

After launch at 23:59 EDT, Discovery opened her payload bay doors. Once the doors were opened the crew deployed the Ku-band antenna and activated the Shuttle Remote Manipulator System (SRMS). Once the Ku-band antenna was deployed and activated, the crew then down-linked photos from the External Tank Umbilical Well Camera system, so controllers on the ground could see how the tank performed and how much if any foam was shed during ascent.

=== August 29 (Flight Day 2 – TPS survey) ===
During Discovery's first full day on orbit, the crew used the SRMS to grapple the Orbiter Boom Sensor System (OBSS) and survey the wing leading edges, nose and other parts of the Thermal Protection System (TPS), as well as the Orbital Maneuvering System (OMS) Pods. During this time some of the crew were preparing the space suits that will be used during the 3 Extra-vehicular activities (EVA) and setting up the tools that will be used during the docking. This includes installing the Centerline Camera and extending the Orbiter Docking system Ring Extension.

=== August 30 (Flight Day 3 – Docking) ===
Discovery docked with the Pressurized Mating Adapter (PMA) 2 on the front of the Harmony connecting module. Before the shuttle docked, Commander Rick Sturckow performed what is known as the Rendezvous Pitch Maneuver while Expedition 20 Commander Gennady Padalka and Flight Engineer Michael Barratt took photos of the shuttle's belly. The photos were down-linked to mission control for review. After docking, Nicole Stott and Tim Kopra switched Soyuz seat liners, making Stott an Expedition 20 Flight Engineer and Tim Kopra an STS-128 Mission Specialist. The joint crews also performed some transfers from the shuttle mid-deck and checked on the pressure in the MPLM Leonardo.

=== August 31 (Flight Day 4 – MPLM berthing) ===
During flight day 4, the MPLM Leonardo was berthed to the Nadir (the Earth-facing port on Harmony) using the Space Station Remote Manipulator System (SSRMS). Once it was berthed, the crews activated it and opened the hatch for ingress. Some more items were transferred from the shuttle mid-deck, including the MDS experiment and the space suits Danny Olivas and Nicole Stott would use during EVA 1. The pair also prepared all the tools that would be used during the EVA with some help from Tim Kopra. Later, during the night, when the crews were asleep, the team of ground controllers vented the Port 1 (P1) Ammonia Tank Assembly (ATA) Nitrogen Vent lines in preparation for the ATA to be removed during EVA 1.

=== September 1 (Flight Day 5 – EVA 1) ===
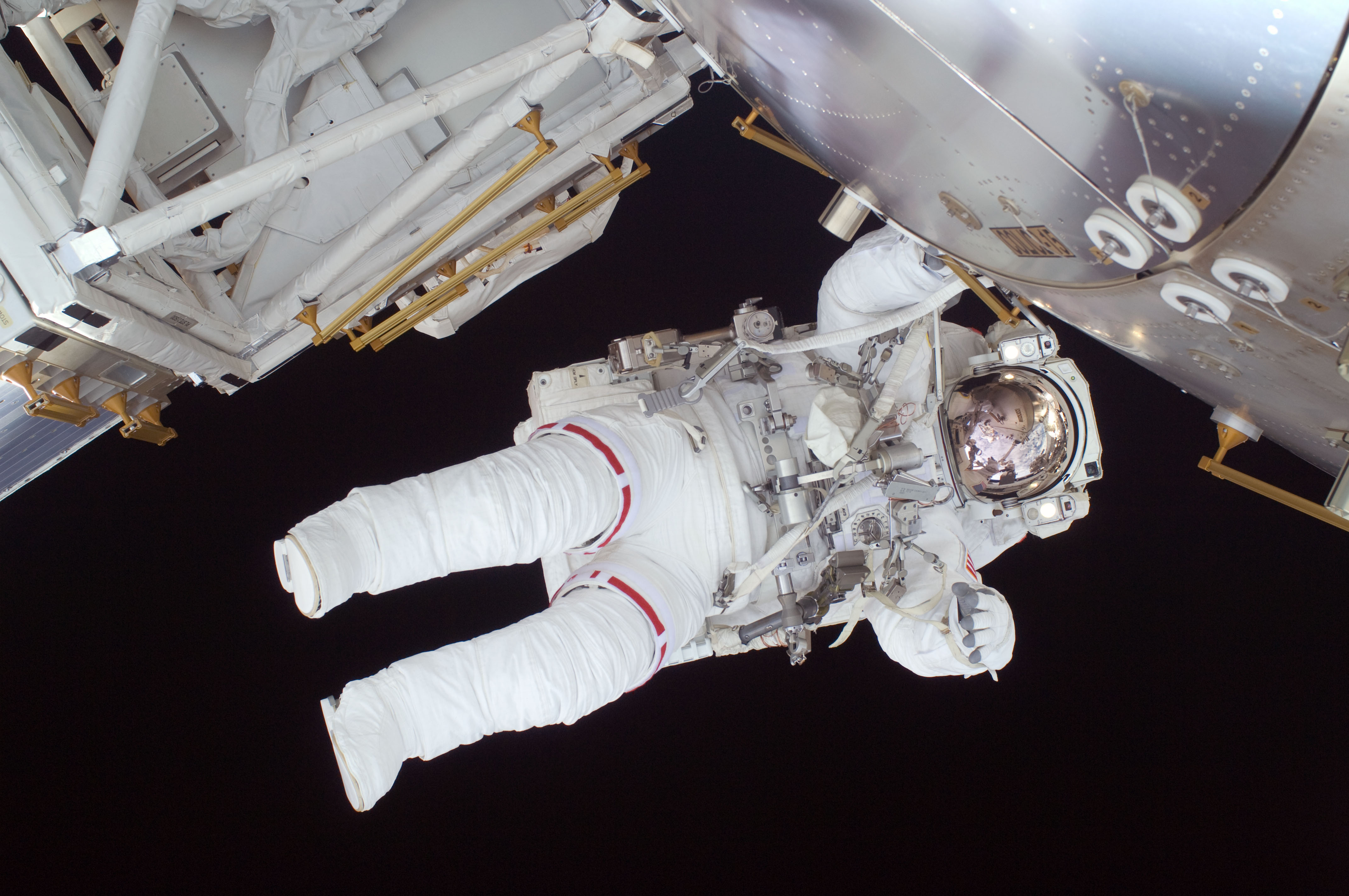
Nicole Stott during the STS-128 mission's first space-walk

EVA 1 was performed, and saw the removal of the empty Ammonia Tank Assembly, and the removal and stowage of the EuTef and MISSE 6 experiments. While the spacewalk was going on crew members inside were transferring the Crew Quarters, C.O.L.B.E.R.T treadmill and the Node 3 Air Revitalization System rack (ARS). The treadmill and ARS were temporarily stowed, while the crew Quarters was installed in the Kibo Module where setup and activation was begun.

=== September 2 (Flight Day 6) ===
During flight day 6, the joint crews continued the activation of the new crew quarters. The last of the major transfer items, the Fluids Integrated Rack (FIR), Materials Science Research Rack, and the Minus Eighty Laboratory Freezer ISS 2 (MELFI-2), were transferred from the Multi-Purpose Logistics Module (MPLM) Leonardo. Astronauts Danny Olivas and José M. Hernández answered some questions submitted on YouTube and Twitter. Olivas and Christer Fuglesang also prepared for the second EVA and "camped out" in the air lock at a lower pressure to help get ready for EVA 2 on flight day 7.

=== September 3 (Flight Day 7 – EVA 2) ===
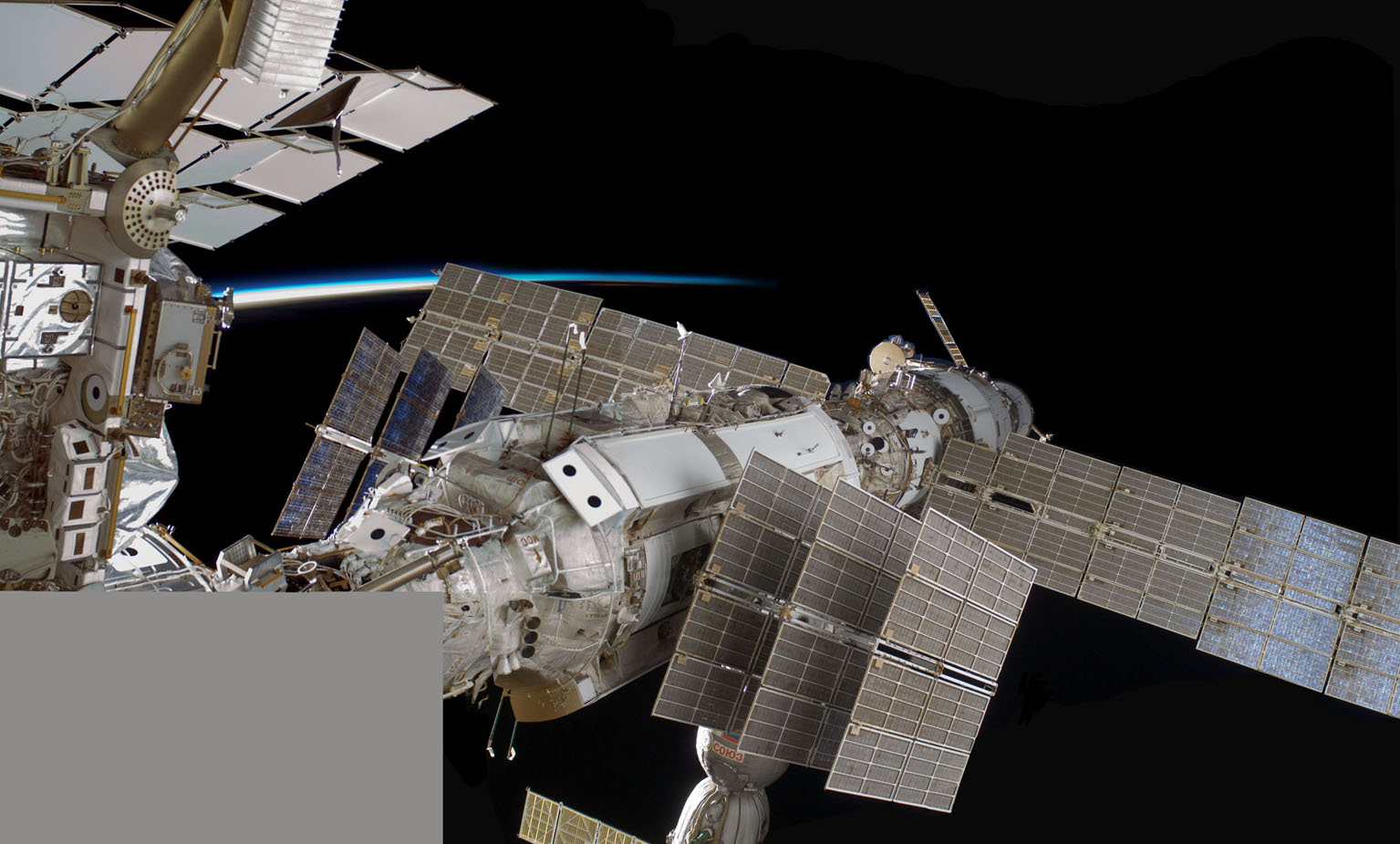
Composite of images showing the Russian Segment during the EVA

On flight day 7, Danny Olivas and Christer Fuglesang performed the second spacewalk of the STS-128 mission. Olivas and Fuglesang installed and connected the new Ammonia Tank Assembly (ATA), and also performed two get aheads. The get ahead tasks included installing protective lens covers on the Space Station Remote Manipulator System (SSRMS) End B cameras . Once the ATA was installed, the tank was integrated into the cooling loop. While Olivas and Fuglesang were outside, the rest of the crew continued on transferring items to and from both the shuttle mid-deck and MPLM.

=== September 4 (Flight Day 8) ===
The first part of the crew day was spent off duty. The crews enjoyed a meal, took a crew photo and took part in a PAO event. More transfer was completed by both crews. The space station crew calibrated the Oxygen Generation System (OGS) H2 sensor. Timothy Kopra and Nicole Stott continued their hand over activities, helping Stott who is taking over from Kopra. Danny Olivas and Christer Fuglesang got their space suits ready for the third and final space walk. The pair spent the night in the Quest Joint Airlock, at a lower pressure of 10.2 psi instead of 14.7 psi.

=== September 5 (Flight Day 9 – EVA 3) ===
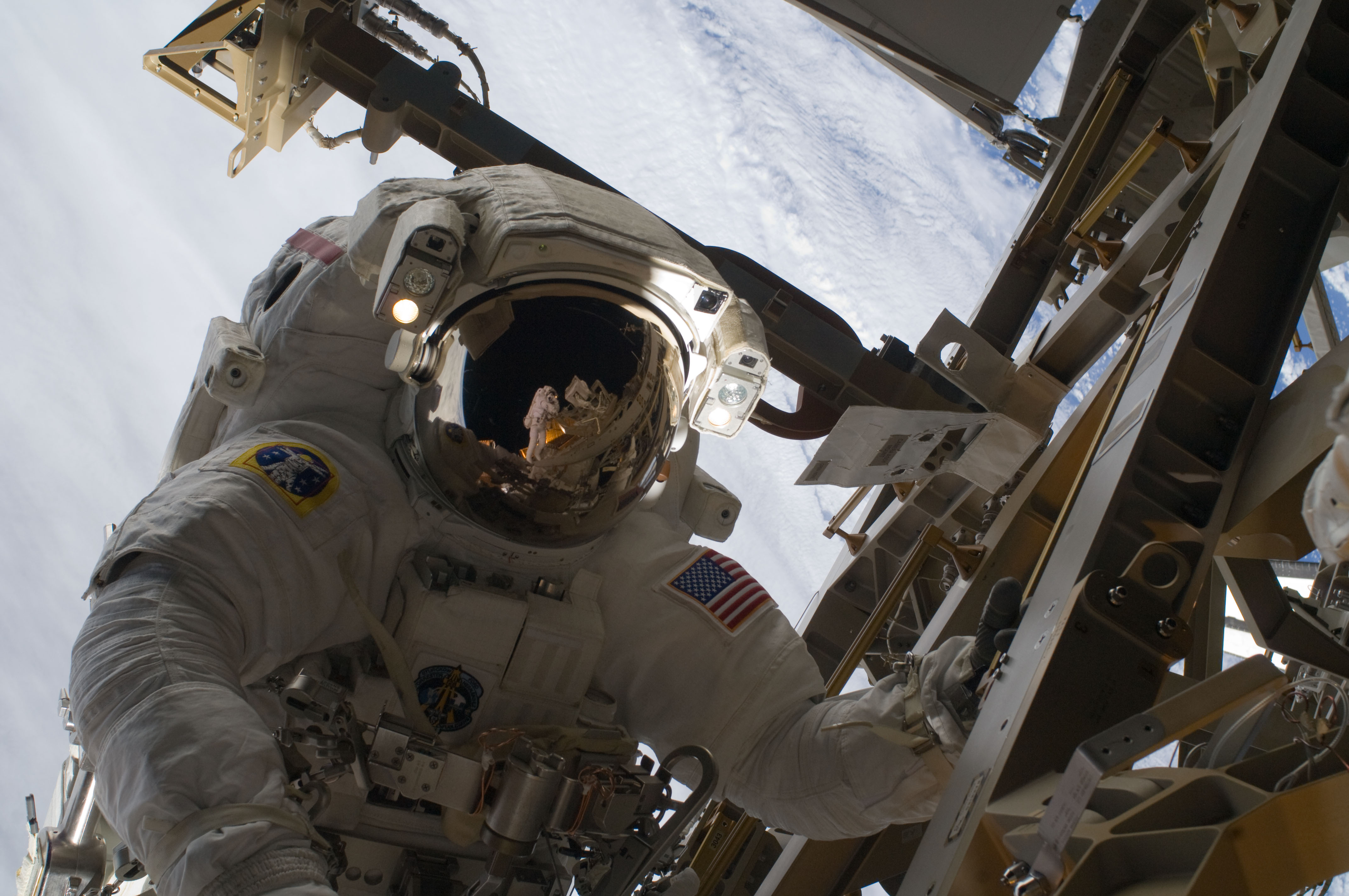
Danny Olivas during EVA 3

Highlights from the third spacewalk (2 min 21 secs)

During flight day 9, Danny Olivas and Christer Fuglesang performed EVA 3. The pair completed all tasks that were to be done, including installing two GPS antennas and deploying the Starboard 3 (S3) Payload Attach System (PAS), a new Rate Gyro Assembly (RGA) 2, and routing of Node 3 Avionics cables. The joint crew also completed more transfer, mostly transfer for return to Earth in the MPLM and Space Shuttle mid-deck. The ISS crew also replaced a bolt on the Common Berthing Mechanism (CBM) so that the MPLM won't get stuck, and also to ensure correct capture of the HTV.

=== September 6 (Flight Day 10 – Off duty) ===
Flight day 10 saw the joint crews transfer samples from the space station to the shuttle freezer known as Glacier. The samples will be returned to Earth for examination by scientists who will develop ways to prevent bone and muscle loss in space as well as cures for other illnesses on Earth. The crews also completed some close outs of the Multi-Purpose Logistics Module Leonardo. The last portion of the crew day was spent off duty.

=== September 7 (Flight Day 11 – Hatch closure) ===
On flight day 11, the joint ISS/shuttle crews completed transfers and closed the hatches with the MPLM. Once the hatches were closed, the MPLM was deactivated, demated and berthed back in the payload bay of the space shuttle. During this process, José M. Hernández and Nicole Stott took part in a PAO event. The end of the crews work days saw the two crews say goodbye in a farewell ceremony and close the hatches between the shuttle and ISS. Once the hatches were closed, the Pressurized Mating Adapter 2 was depressurized, in advance of undocking. The shuttle crew setup and checked out the rendezvous tools before going to bed.

=== September 8 (Flight Day 12 – Undocking) ===
On flight day 12, Space Shuttle Discovery successfully undocked from the International Space Station at 19:26 UTC. After undocking, the shuttle backed out and performed a fly around of the ISS. The Space Shuttle then performed two separation burns using its thrusters. After the separation burns, astronauts Kevin Ford, José M. Hernández, and Christer Fuglesang used the Orbiter Boom Sensor System (OBSS) to inspect the shuttle's Thermal Protection System (TPS). When they completed that task, the OBSS was berthed on the starboard sill of the payload bay and the Shuttle Remote Manipulator System (SRMS) was powered down.

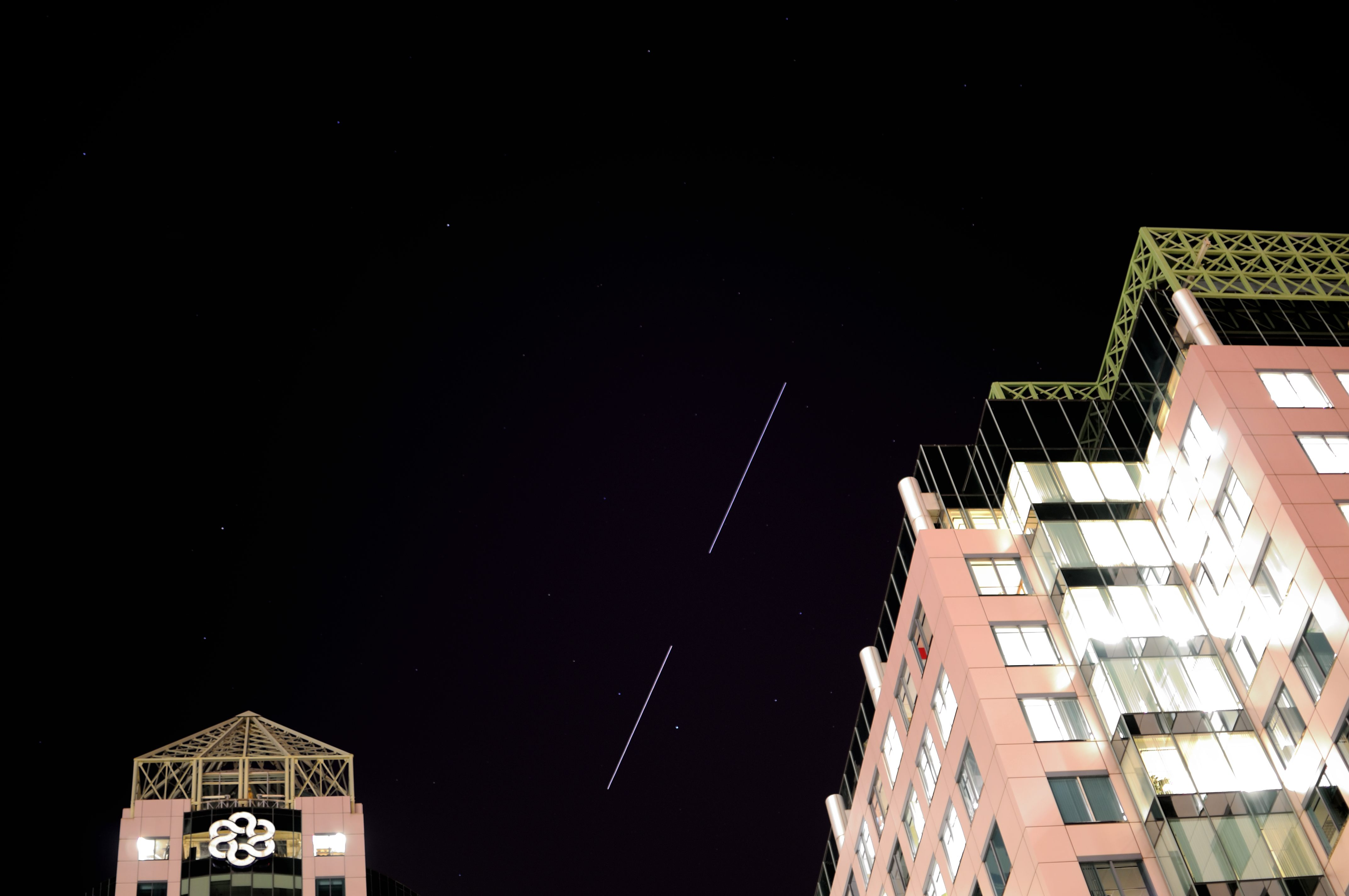
Space Shuttle Discovery and International Space Station on September 8, 2009, after undocking

=== September 9 (Flight Day 13 – End of mission prep) ===
On flight day 13, the Space Shuttle crew began stowing items for landing. During the course of the day, commander Frederick W. Sturckow and pilot Kevin A. Ford performed standard checks of the Flight Control Systems (FCS), Reaction Control System (RCS) jets, and communications with the ground. The crew also deactivated the Wing Leading Edge System (WLES), stowed the Ku-band antenna, and reviewed landing procedures.

=== September 10 (Flight Day 14 – Landing postponed) ===
On flight day 14, Discovery was scheduled to land at Kennedy Space Center at 19:04 EDT (23:04 UTC). The landing was postponed due to weather conditions, and the second opportunity at 20:40 EDT (00:40 UTC) was also postponed due to weather conditions.

=== September 11 (Flight Day 15 – Landing) ===
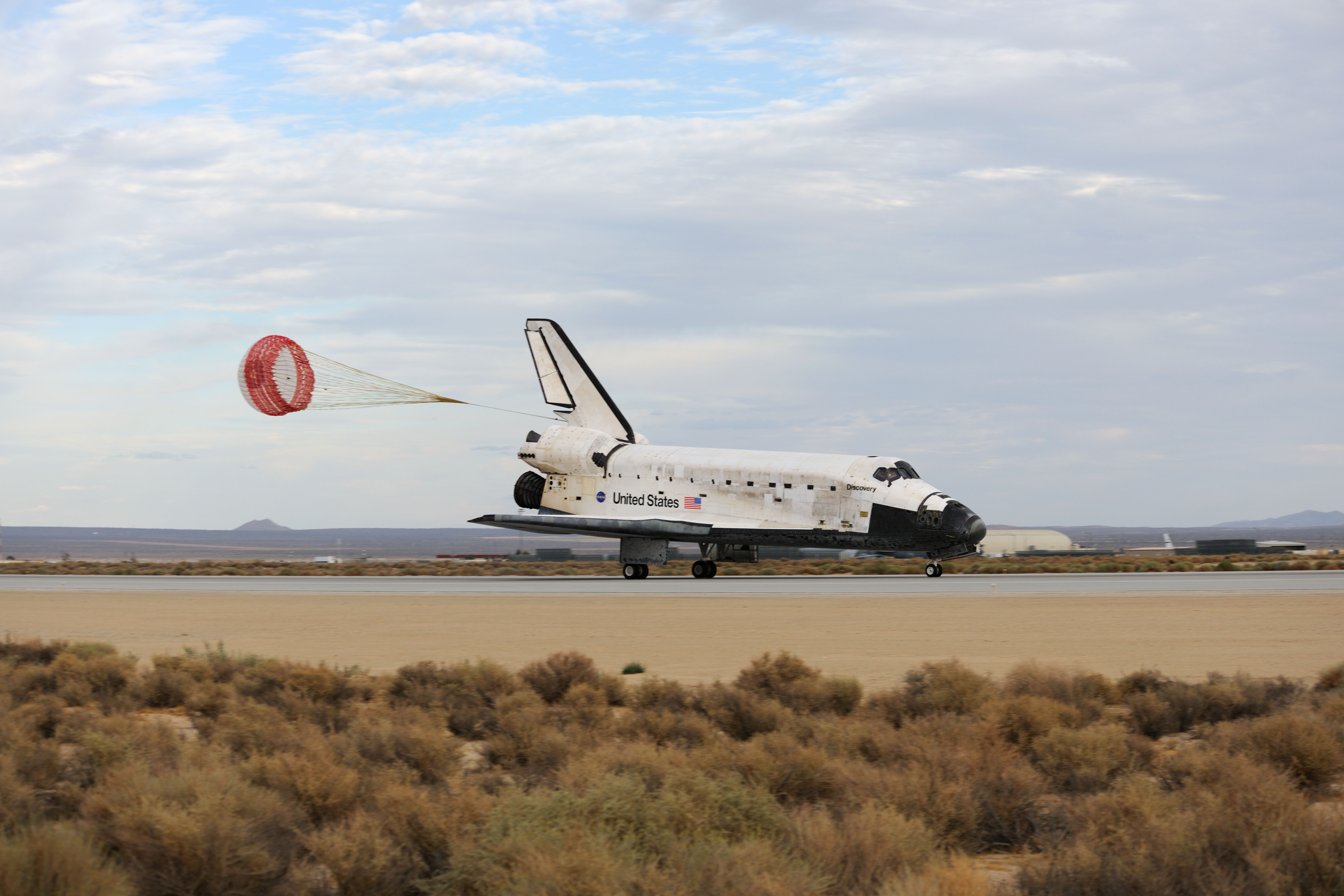
After weather delayed two landing opportunities at Kennedy Space Center, Discovery lands at Edwards Air Force Base, California.

On flight day 15, at 19:47 EDT (23:47 UTC), Discovery started the de-orbit burn for landing at Edwards Air Force Base after its two landing attempts at Kennedy Space Center the previous day were waved off. Discovery touched down safely at 20:53 EDT (17:53 PDT/00:53 UTC).

The landing marked the final time a Space Shuttle mission concluded at Edwards Air Force Base, as well as the last time a ferry flight would be needed for an operational orbiter. Discovery returned to KSC on Monday, September 21, 2009, after refueling stops at Amarillo International Airport, Fort Worth Naval Station, and Barksdale Air Force Base on September 20. The last seven missions of the shuttle all touched down at Kennedy Space Center.

== Spacewalks ==
Each spacewalk was planned to last approximately 6.5 hours.

EVA	Spacewalkers	Start (UTC)	End (UTC)	Duration
EVA 1	John D. Olivas; Nicole Stott	September 1, 2009; 21:49 UTC	September 2, 2009; 04:24 UTC	6 hours, 35 minutes
EVA 1	Prepared for the replacement of an empty ammonia tank on the station's port truss by releasing its bolts. Retrieved the Materials International Space Station Experiment and European Technology Exposure Facility mounted outside the Columbus laboratory, and stowed them in Discovery's cargo bay for their return to Earth. Robotic Arm Operators: Ford and Thirsk			
EVA 2	John D. Olivas; Christer Fuglesang	September 3, 2009; 22:13 UTC	September 4, 2009; 04:51UTC	6 hours, 39 minutes
EVA 2	Removed the new ammonia tank from the shuttle's payload bay and replaced it with the used tank from the station. The new tank, weighing about 1,800 pounds (820 kg), was the most mass ever moved by spacewalking astronauts. With this spacewalk, ESA astronaut Fuglesang became the first person, who is not from either an American or Russian space program, to have participated in four or more spacewalks. Robotic Arm Operators: Ford and Stott			
EVA 3	John D. Olivas; Christer Fuglesang	September 5, 2009; 20:39 UTC	September 6, 2009; 03:40 UTC	7 hours, 01 minutes
EVA 3	Preparations for the arrival of the Tranquility node by attaching cables between the starboard truss and the Unity node, the area where Tranquility will be installed. Tranquility is targeted to arrive on STS-130 in February 2010. The spacewalkers also replaced a communications sensor device, installed two new GPS antennas, and replaced a circuit breaker.			

== Wake-up calls ==
NASA began a tradition of playing music to astronauts during the Gemini program, which was first used to wake up a flight crew during Apollo 15. Each track is specially chosen, often by their families, and usually has a special meaning to an individual member of the crew, or is applicable to their daily activities.

Flight Day	Song	Artist	Played for
Day 2	"Back In The Saddle Again"	Gene Autry	Frederick W. Sturckow
Day 3	"Made to Love"	TobyMac	Nicole Stott
Day 4	"Mi Tierra"	Gloria Estefan	José M. Hernández
Day 5	"Indiana, Our Indiana"	Indiana University Band	Kevin A. Ford
Day 6	"What a Wonderful World"	Louis Armstrong	Christer Fuglesang
Day 7	"There is a God"	33Miles	Patrick G. Forrester
Day 8	"What a Wonderful World"	Louis Armstrong	Danny Olivas
Day 9	"El Hijo del Pueblo"	José Alfredo Jiménez	José M. Hernández
Day 10	"Rocket"	Andrew Peterson	Patrick G. Forrester
Day 11	"Only One"	Jeremy Kay	John D. Olivas
Day 12	"Beautiful Day"	U2	Timothy Kopra
Day 13	"Sailing"	Rod Stewart	Christer Fuglesang
Day 14	"Good Day Sunshine"	The Beatles	Kevin A. Ford
Day 15	"Big Boy Toys"	Aaron Tippin	Frederick W. Sturckow

== Media ==
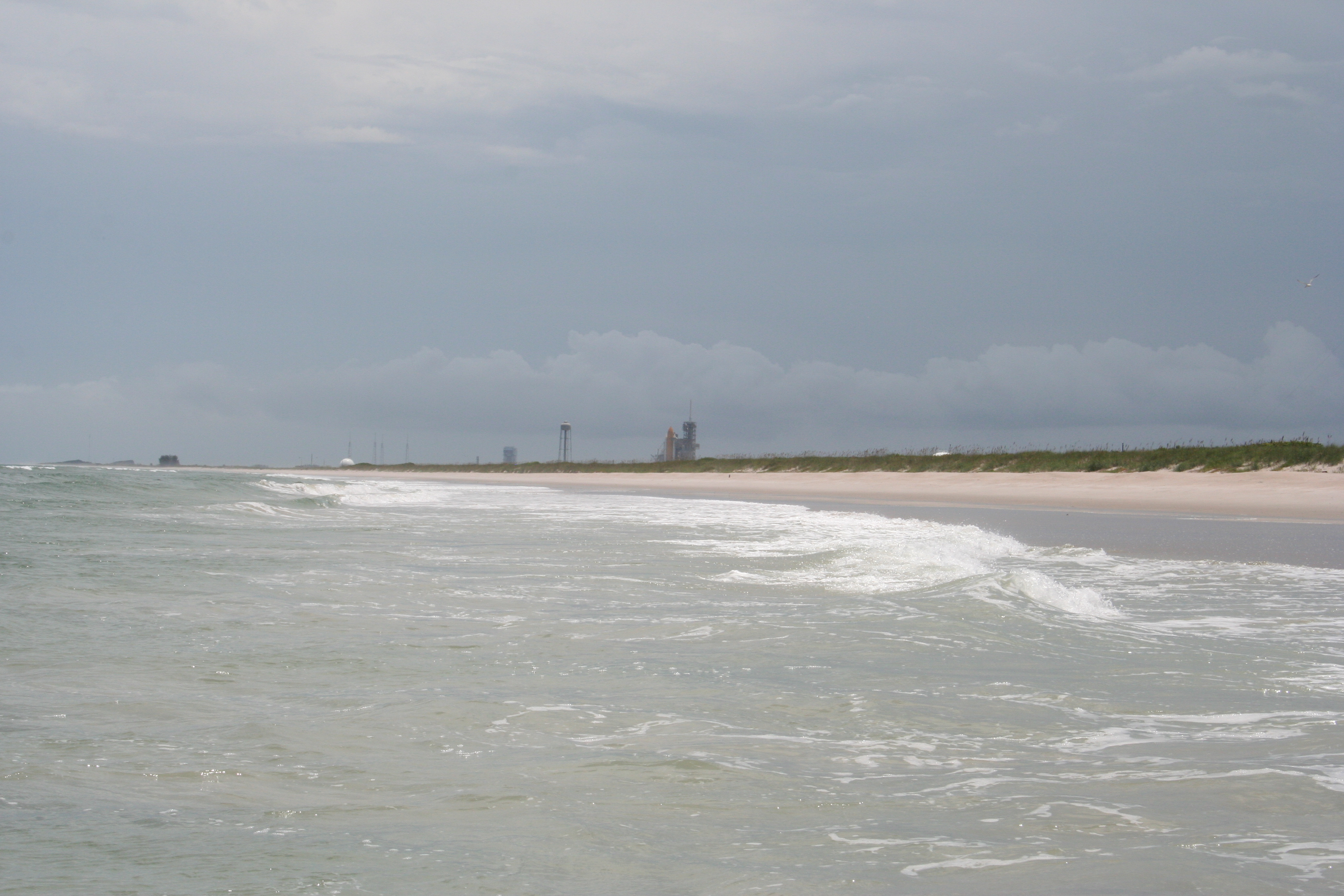
Discovery on the pad 6 August 2009

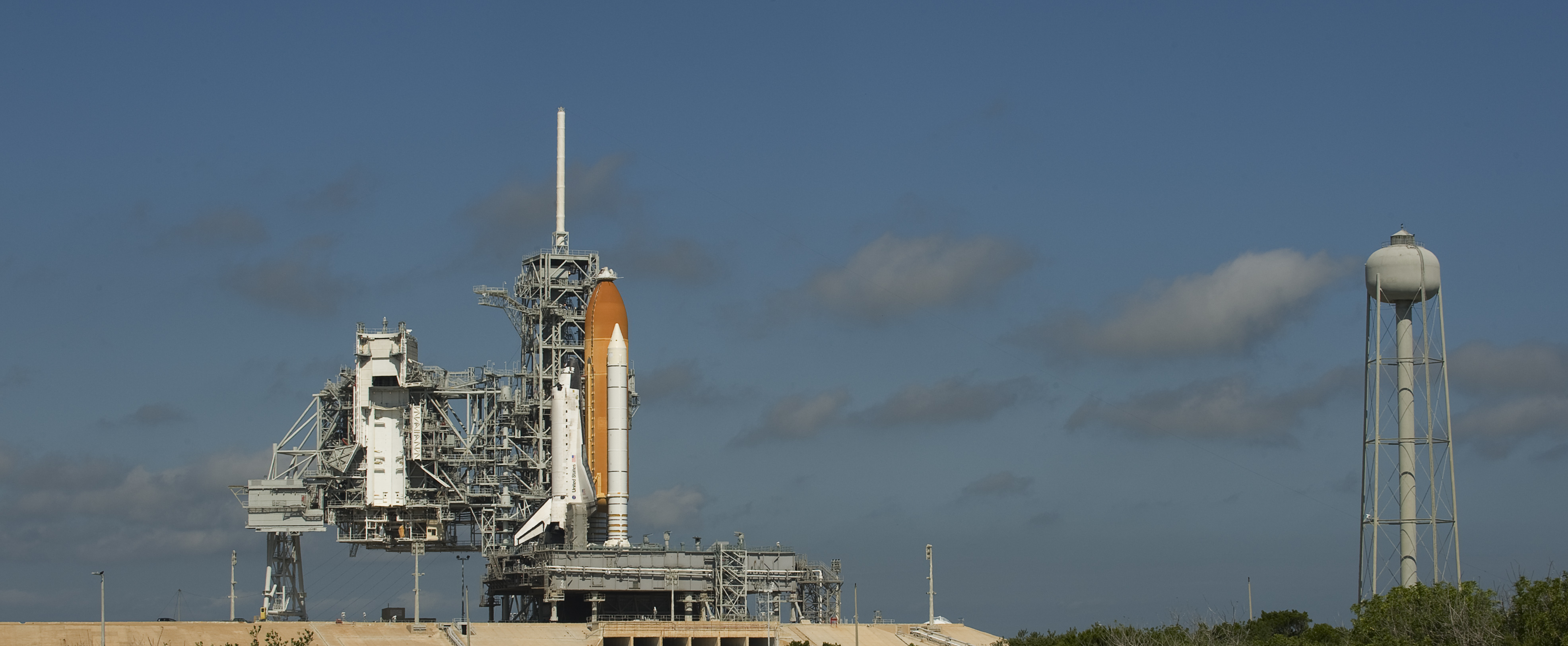
Discovery poised for lift-off

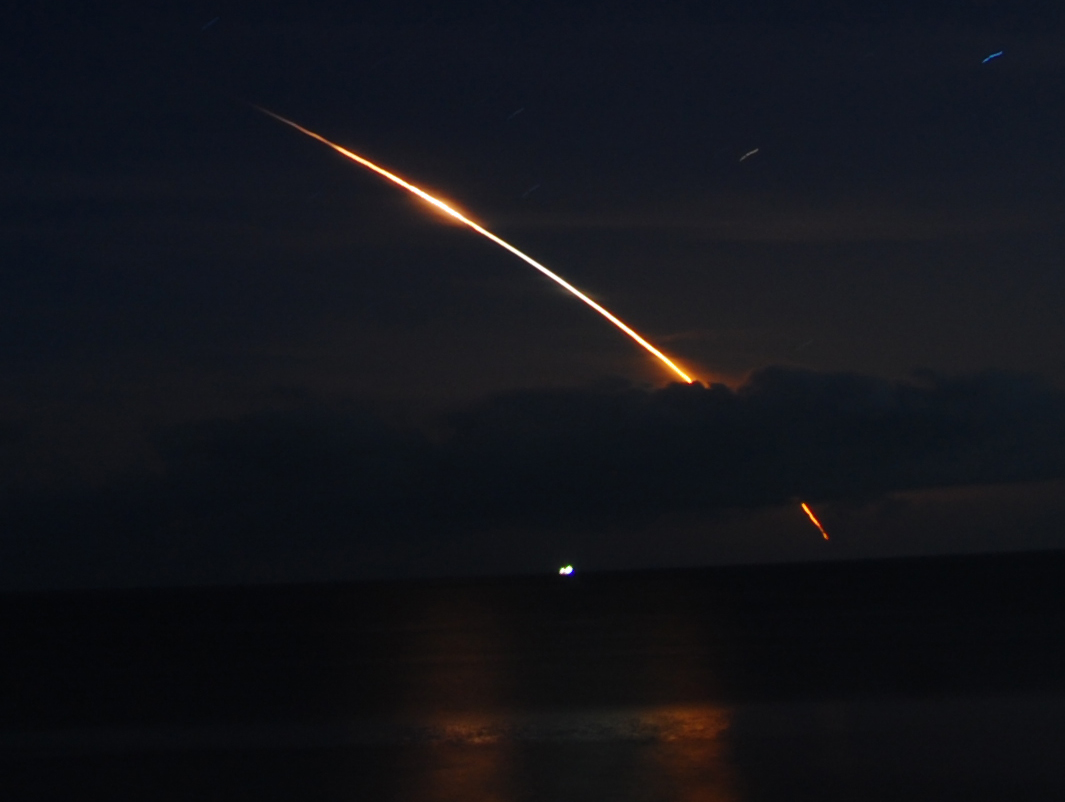
Launch from 180 miles away (long exposure)

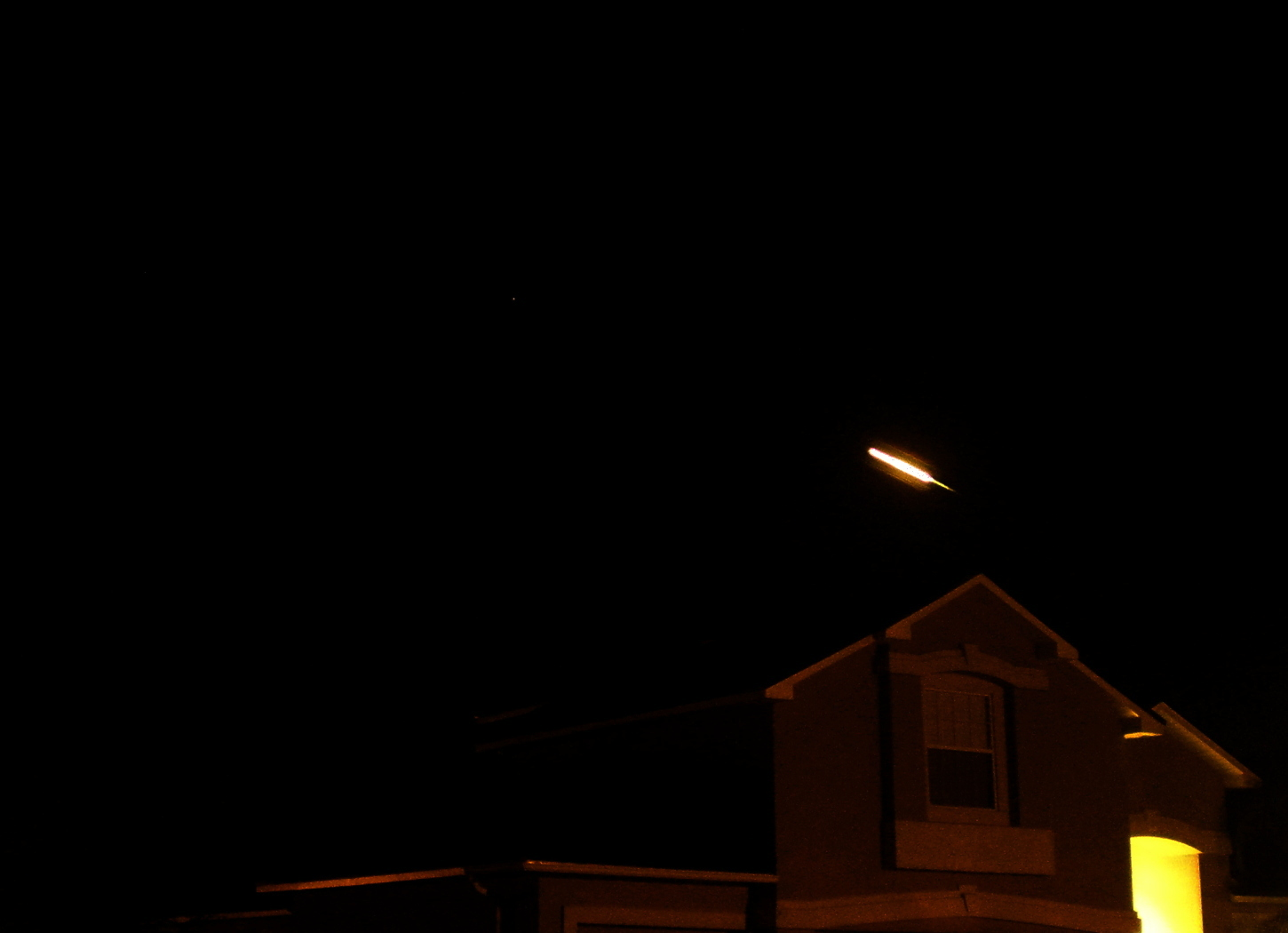
STS-128 as seen from Bartram Springs in Jacksonville, FL

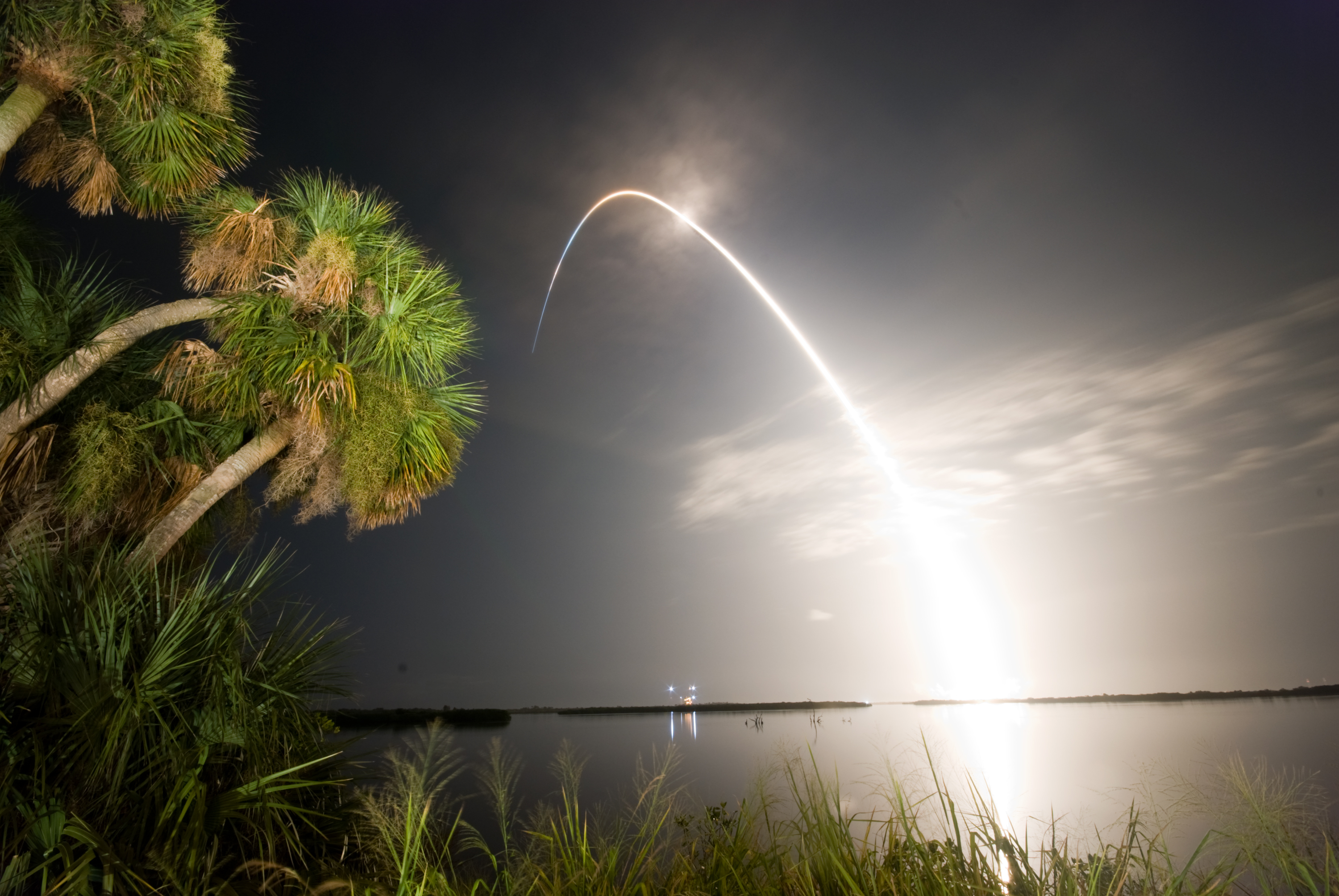
Long exposure picture of STS-128 launching

Video of launch

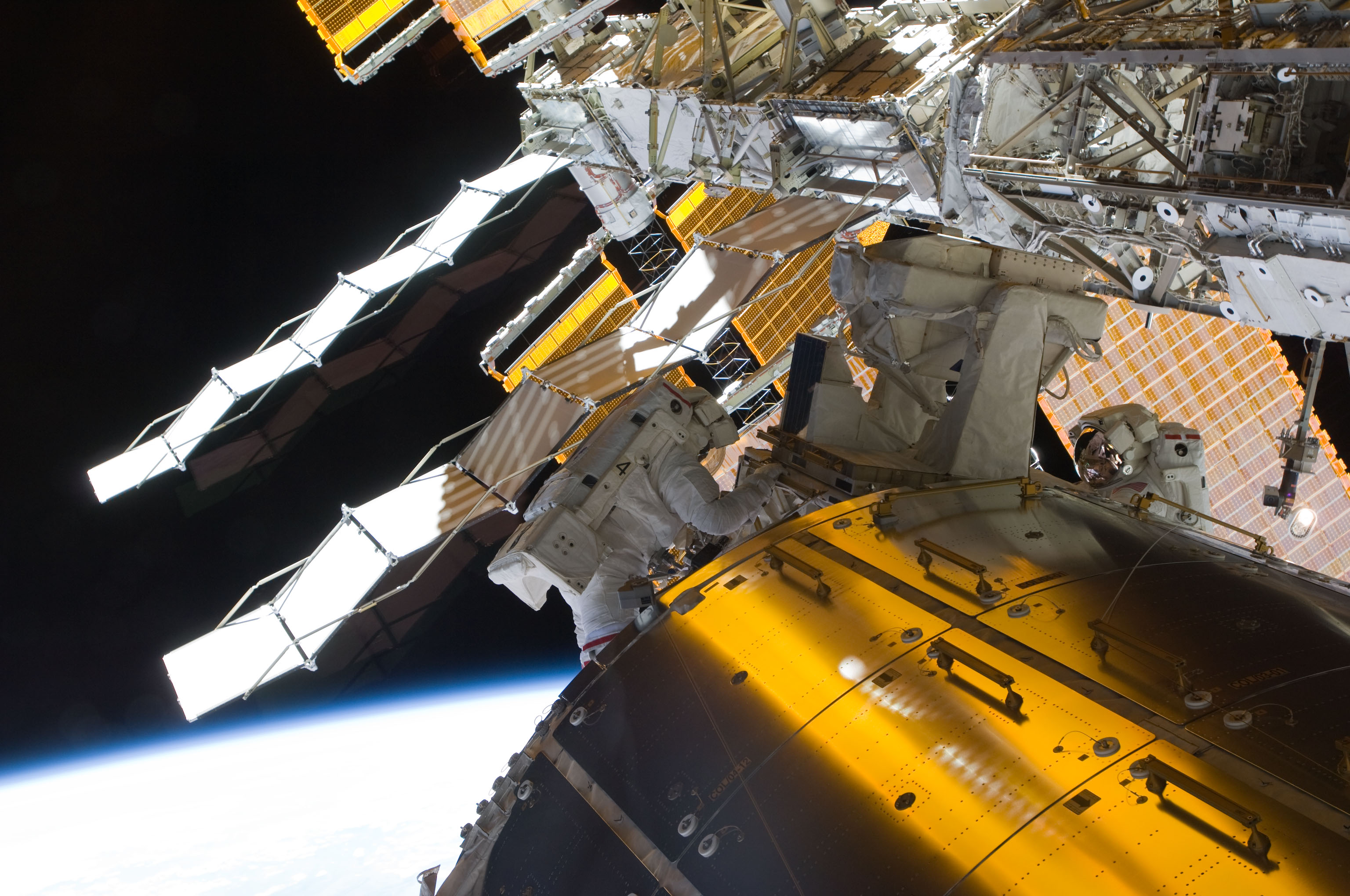
Olivas(left) and Stott (right) during EVA 1.

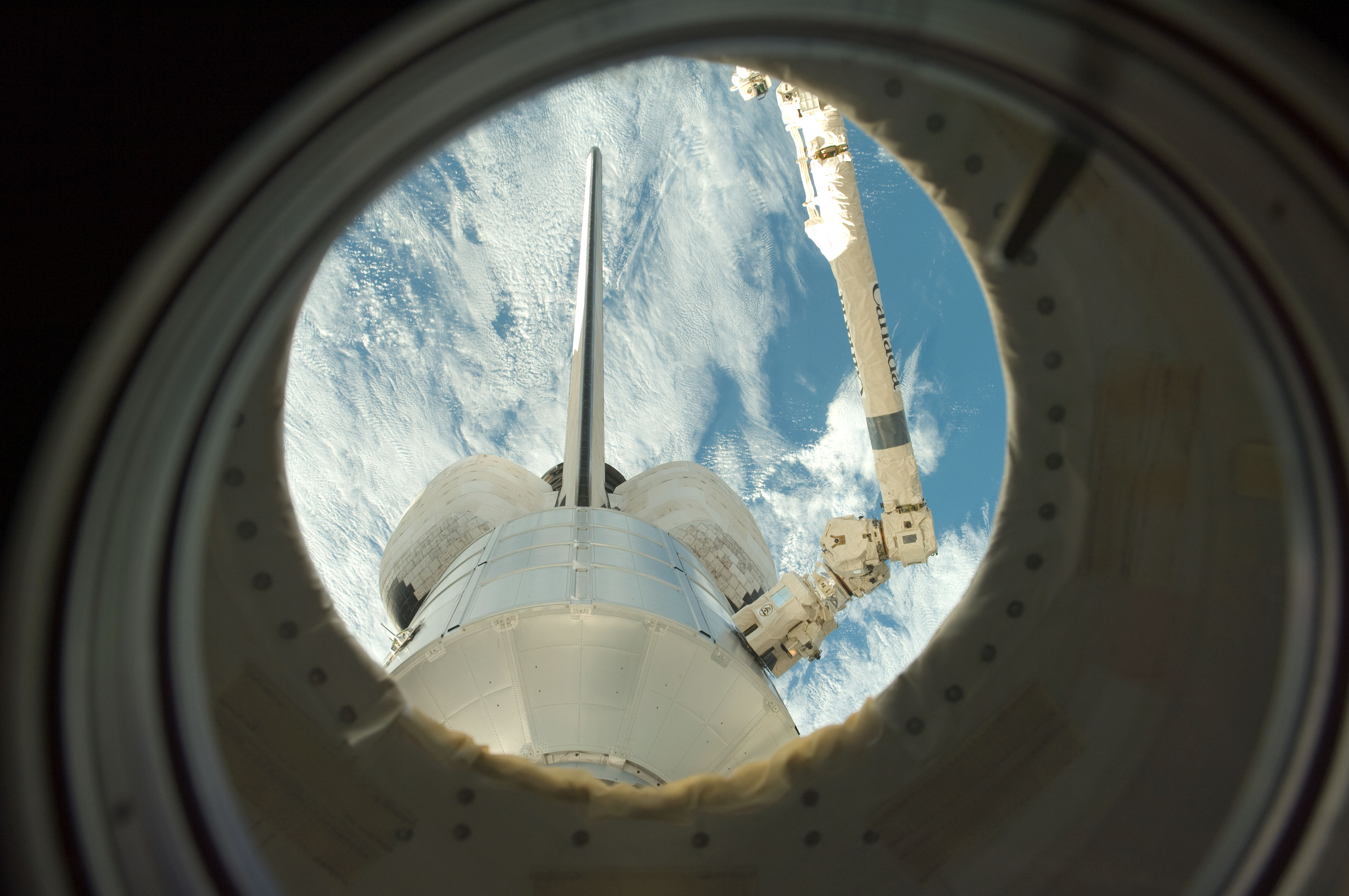
Leonardo is placed back in Discovery's payload bay.

== See also ==
- 2009 in spaceflight
- List of human spaceflights
- List of International Space Station spacewalks
- List of Space Shuttle missions
- List of spacewalks 2000–2014
