= Patrick G. Forrester =

American astronaut, engineer and US Army officer (born 1957)

Patrick Forrester
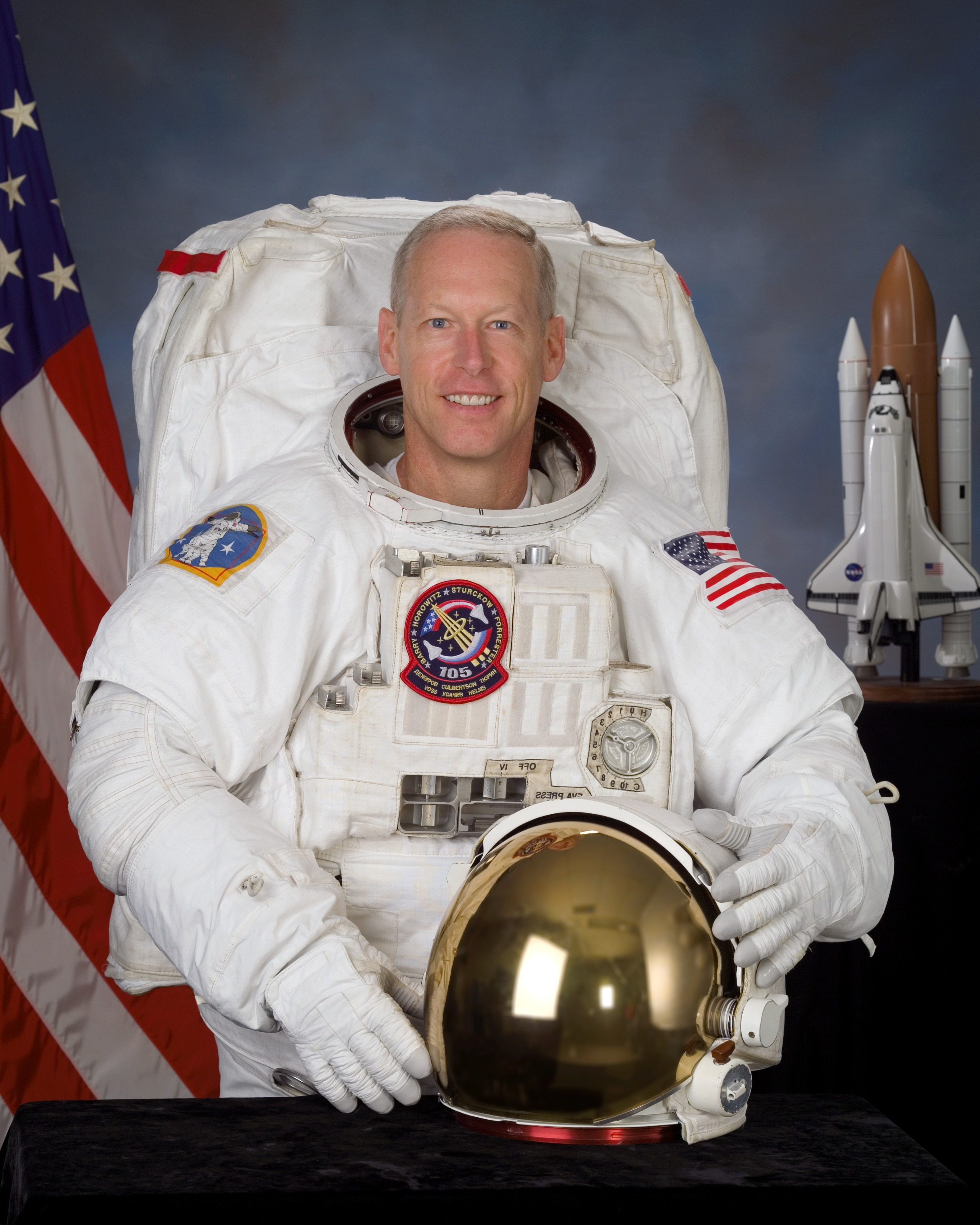
- Born: Patrick Graham Forrester; March 31, 1957 (age 69); El Paso, Texas, U.S.
- Education: United States Military Academy (BS); University of Virginia (MS)
- Space career

NASA astronaut
- Rank: Colonel, USA (ret.)
- Time in space: 39d 14h 18m
- Selection: NASA Group 16 (1996)
- Total EVAs: 4
- Total EVA time: 25h 22m
- Missions: STS-105; STS-117; STS-128
- Mission insignia

Patrick Graham Forrester (born March 31, 1957) is a NASA astronaut, engineer, and former Chief of the Astronaut Office. He is a retired United States Army colonel and Army aviator. He is married and has two children.

Forrester flew on three Space Shuttle missions: STS-105, STS-117, and STS-128.

== Personal ==
Born March 31, 1957, in El Paso, Texas, he is an Eagle Scout in the Boy Scouts of America. Forrester is married to the former Diana Lynn Morris of Springfield, Virginia. They have two sons, Patrick Forrester Jr. and Andrew. His father, Colonel (ret.) Redmond V. Forrester, is deceased; his mother, Patsy L. Forrester, is deceased.

== Education ==
- 1975: Graduated from West Springfield High School in Springfield, Virginia
- 1979: Received a Bachelor of Science degree in applied sciences and engineering from the United States Military Academy in West Point, New York
- 1989: Received a Master of Science degree in mechanical and aerospace engineering from the University of Virginia in Charlottesville, Virginia

== Organizations ==
- Society of Experimental Test Pilots
- Army Aviation Association of America
- American Helicopter Society

== Awards and honors ==
- U.S. Army Aviation Hall of Fame (2011)
- NASA Outstanding Leadership Medal (2017)
- NASA Exceptional Service Medal (2008, 2010)
- NASA Space Flight Medal (2001, 2007, 2009)
- The Jack Northrop Award for most outstanding presentation at the 26th Annual Society of Experimental Test Pilots Symposium (1996)
- The Order of St. Michael (Bronze 2001, Silver 2007)
- Defense Superior Service Medal
- Legion of Merit
- Meritorious Service Medal (2nd Oak leaf cluster)
- Army Commendation Medal
- Army Achievement Medal
- National Defense Service Medal
- Expert Infantryman Badge
- The Lyndon B. Johnson Space Center Certificate of Commendation (1995)

== Military career ==
Forrester graduated from West Point in June 1979 and was commissioned as a second lieutenant in the U.S. Army. He entered the U.S. Army Aviation School in 1979 and was designated an Army Aviator in September 1980. He was subsequently assigned as an instructor pilot at the Aviation School, and as the aide-de-camp to the Deputy Commanding General of the U.S. Army Aviation Center. In 1984, he was assigned to the 25th Infantry Division (Light), Schofield Barracks, Hawaii, where he was a platoon leader, aviation company operations officer, and an assault helicopter battalion operations officer. After completing a Master of Science degree at the University of Virginia in 1989, he was assigned as a flight test engineer and as the research and development coordinator with the Army Aviation Engineering Flight Activity at Edwards Air Force Base, California. In June 1992, he graduated from the U.S. Naval Test Pilot School and was designated an experimental test pilot. In 1992, he was assigned as an engineering test pilot at the U.S. Army Aviation Technical Test Center, Fort Rucker, Alabama. Other military schools include the Army Parachutist Course, U.S. Army Ranger School, the Combined Arms Services Staff School, and the Command and General Staff College.

A Master Army Aviator, Forrester has logged over 5,500 hours in over 50 different aircraft.

Forrester retired from the Army in October 2005.

== NASA career ==
Forrester was assigned to NASA at the Johnson Space Center as an aerospace engineer in July 1993. His technical assignments within the Astronaut Office Operations Development Branch have included: flight software testing with the Shuttle Avionics Integration Laboratory (SAIL); Astronaut Office representative for Landing/Rollout issues, Multi-function Electronic Display System (MEDS) upgrade of the Orbiter fleet, and the Portable In-flight Landing Operations Trainer (PILOT). He has also was the crew representative for robotics development for the International Space Station.

Forrester was selected as an astronaut candidate by NASA in May 1996. Having completed two years of training and evaluation, he is qualified for flight assignment as a mission specialist. Initially, Forrester was assigned to duties at the Kennedy Space Center as a member of the astronaut support team, responsible for Shuttle prelaunch vehicle checkout, crew ingress and strap-in, and crew egress after landing. He next was the technical assistant to the Director, Flight Crew Operations. Following that, Forrester was the Shuttle training and on-board crew procedures representative. Forrester flew on STS-105 in 2001, with the crew of STS-117 in 2007, and as a mission specialist on the STS-128 mission in 2009. He has logged over 950 hours in space, including four spacewalks totaling 25 hours and 22 minutes of EVA time.

=== Chief of the Astronaut Office ===
He was announced as Chief of the Astronaut Office on June 2, 2017. He is the first Army officer to hold this position. He replaced Chris Cassidy who returned to normal flight status. He was in this position until December 20, 2020, when Gregory R. Wiseman was selected.

=== STS-105 ===
Discovery (August 10–22, 2001) was the 11th mission to the International Space Station (ISS). While at the orbital outpost, the STS-105 crew delivered the Expedition 3 crew, attached the Leonardo Multi-Purpose Logistics Module (MPLM), and transferred over 2.7 metric tons of supplies and equipment to the station. During the mission, Forrester and Dan Barry performed two spacewalks totaling 11 hours and 45 minutes of EVA time. Forrester was the prime robotics operator to install the MPLM. STS-105 also brought home the Expedition 2 crew. The STS-105 mission was accomplished in 186 orbits of the Earth, traveling over 4.9 million miles in 285 hours and 13 minutes.

=== STS-117 ===
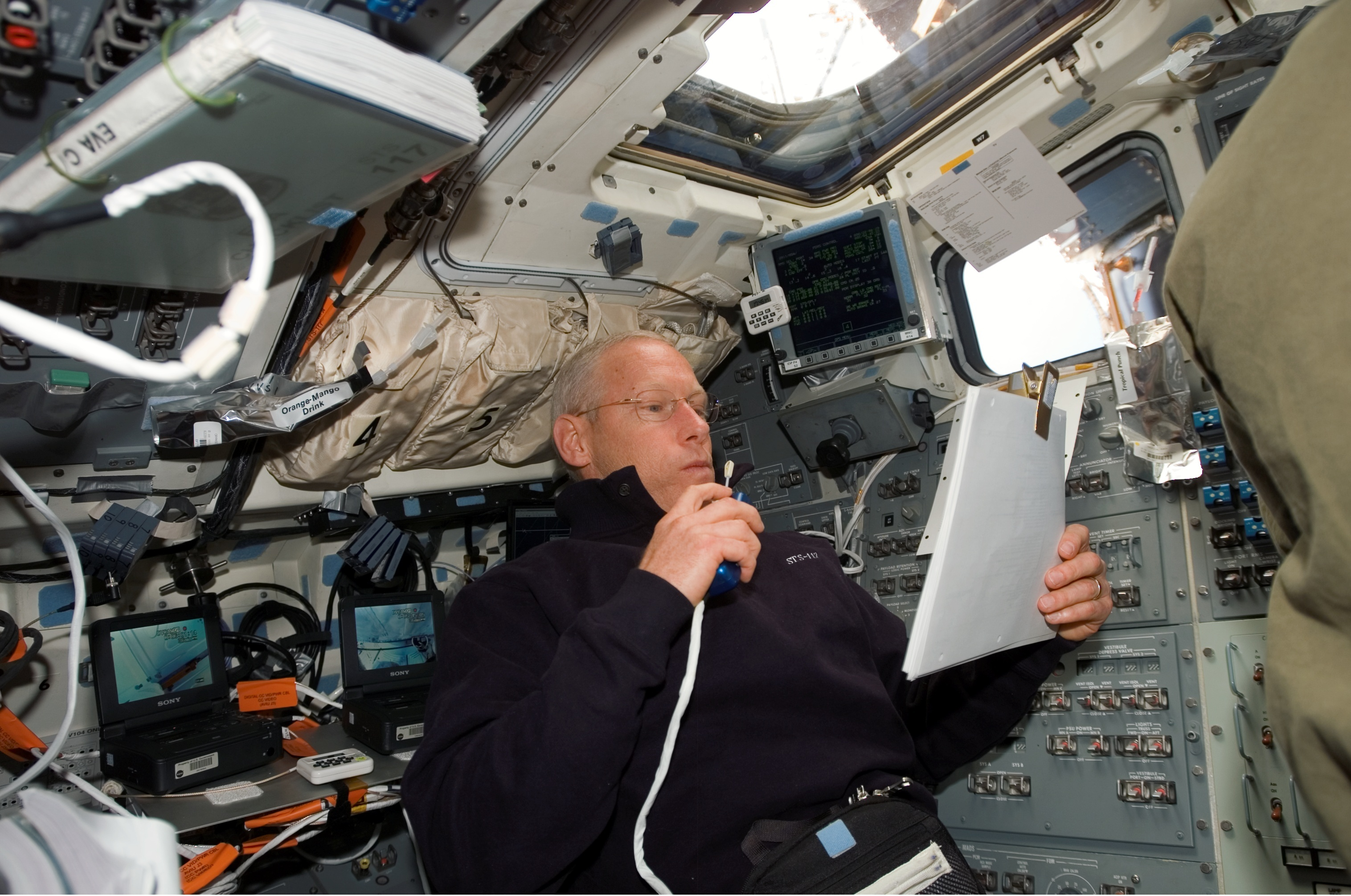
Forrester pictured during STS-117

Atlantis (June 8–22, 2007) was the 118th Shuttle mission and the 21st mission to visit the ISS, delivering the second starboard truss segment, the third set of U.S. solar arrays and batteries and associated equipment. The successful construction and repair mission involved four spacewalks by two teams. Forrester accumulated 13 hours and 37 minutes of EVA time in two spacewalks. The mission also delivered crewmember Clayton Anderson, and returned with Sunita Williams from the Expedition 15 crew. STS-117 returned to land at Edwards Air Force Base, California, having traveled 5.8 million miles in 14 days.

=== STS-128 ===
Discovery (August 28-September 11, 2009) was the 128th Shuttle mission and the 30th mission to the ISS. While at the orbital outpost, the STS-128 crew rotated Nicole Stott for crewmember Timothy Kopra on Expedition 20, attached the Leonardo MPLM and transferred more than 18,000 pounds of supplies and equipment to the ISS. The STS-128 crew conducted three spacewalks. Forrester was the prime robotics operator for Discovery. The STS-128 mission was accomplished in 217 orbits of the Earth, traveling more than 5.7 million miles in 332 hours and 53 minutes and returned to land at Edwards Air Force Base, California.

Forrester is the Chief Operating Officer for 9Marks, where he oversees the day-to-day operations of the ministry, and its development efforts.

== See also ==
| Preceded by Christopher Cassidy | Chief of the Astronaut Office; 2017–2020 | Succeeded by Reid Wiseman |
