= One Life (Johnny Clegg album) =

Studio album by Johnny Clegg
- Released: 2006
- Recorded: 2006
- Genre: World Music, Rock
- Length: 57:46
- Label: Rhythm Dog Music
- Producer: Johnny Clegg, Renaud, Claude Six

Johnny Clegg chronology
Heart of the Dancer (2006)	One Life (2006)

One Life is a studio album by South African artist Johnny Clegg, released in 2006. Johnny Clegg, Renaud and Claude Six are listed as the executive producers in the liner notes. The CD and liner notes - with numerous typos - were produced by Marabi Productions.

== Track listing ==
1. "Daughter of Eden"
2. "Jongosi"
3. "Makhabeleni"
4. "Thamela-Die Son Trek Water"
5. "The Revolution Will Eat Its Children (anthem for Uncle Bob)"
6. "Utshani Obulele"
7. "Faut Pas Baisser Les Bras"
8. "Devana"
9. "Bull Heart"
10. "Day in the Life"
11. "Boy Soldier"
12. "Touch the Sun"
13. "4 Box Square"
14. "I Don't Want to Be Away"
15. "Locked and Loaded"
16. "Utshani Obulele (Zulu version)"
17. "Asilazi"

All songs, music and lyrics by Johnny Clegg, except "Faut Pas Baisser les Bras", lyrics by Claude Six and Johnny Clegg, and vocal intro to "Thamela", traditional.

== Reception ==
Professional ratings
Review scores
Source	Rating
The Guardian	3/5 stars
AllMusic	4/5 stars

The album won SAMA 13's Best Adult Contemporary Album Award in the English category and received positive reviews by The Guardian and AllMusic.
