= One Life (33Miles album) =

Studio album by 33Miles
- Released: September 16, 2008
- Length: 39:39
- Label: INO

33Miles chronology
33Miles (2007)	One Life (2008)	Believe (2009)

Professional ratings
Review scores
Source	Rating
AllMusic	4/5 stars
Jesus Freak Hideout	3.5/5 stars
The Trades	5/5 stars

One Life is the second studio album from contemporary Christian band, 33Miles, released on September 16, 2008 through Columbia Records. In October, the album peaked at No. 161 on the Billboard 200 and No. 4 on Billboard's Top Christian Albums chart.

== Track listing ==
1. "Gone" - 3:39
2. "Jesus Calling" - 4:45
3. "One Life to Love" - 3:59
4. "Something Different" - 3:40
5. "Apologize" - 4:19
6. "Just One of Those Days" - 4:05
7. "When It All Comes Down" - 3:11
8. "I Loved You Then" - 3:53
9. "My Offering" - 4:25
10. "Little Bit of Love" - 3:47

== Radio singles ==
- "One Life to Love" :No. 10 Hot Christian Songs
- "Jesus Calling" No. 26 Hot Christian Songs
