= 33Miles =

Christian band

- Origin: Franklin, Tennessee, US
- Genre: Contemporary Christian music
- Years active: 2005–present
- Label: INO
- Members: Jason Barton
- Past members: Collin Stoddard; Chris Lockwood
- Website: facebook.com/33miles

33Miles is a contemporary Christian band with country music influences from Franklin, Tennessee.

== Background ==
The band began playing in Nashville and signed to INO Records, who released the band's debut album, 33Miles, in 2007. The album peaked at No. 8 on Billboard's Top Heatseekers albums chart and No. 16 on its Top Christian Albums chart. In 2008, their next album, One Life charted at No. 161 the Billboard 200 and No. 4 on Billboard Top Christian Albums chart. In 2009, they released their Christmas album, Believe. Their 2007 song, "There is a God", was played as the wake-up call music for the Space Shuttle astronauts on their STS-128 mission on September 3, 2009. Pianist Collin Stoddard left the group in 2009 to become a pastor. In 2010, Barton and Lockwood continued on and released Today. In 2014, Lockwood left the band.

== Members ==
Current

- Jason Barton – lead vocals (formerly of True Vibe)

Former

- Collin Stoddard – piano, backing vocals (2005–2009)
- Chris Lockwood – guitar, backing vocals (2005–2014)

== Albums ==
- 33Miles (INO Records, 2007)
- One Life (INO Records, 2008) U.S. No. 161
- Believe (Christmas release, INO Records, 2009)
- Today (INO Records, 2010)
- Acoustic Sessions Vol. 1 (EP, self-produced/released, 2011)
- Let It Be Glory (Milestone Records, 2013)

=== Singles ===
| Year | Single | Album | Hot Christian Songs Peak |
|---|---|---|---|
| 2007 | "What Could Be Better" | 33Miles | 11 |
| 2007 | "There Is a God" | 33Miles | 25 |
| 2008 | "Thank You" | 33Miles | 12 |
| 2008 | "One Life to Love" | One Life | 10 |
| 2009 | "Jesus Calling" | One Life | 26 |
| 2009 | "Joy to the World" | Believe | 17 |
| 2009 | "Finally Christmas" | Believe | 22 |
| 2010 | "Where I Wanna Go" | Today | 46 |
| 2010 | "Arms That Hold the Universe" | Today | |
| 2010 | "What Grace Looks Like" | Today | |
| 2013 | "Let It Be Glory" | Let It Be Glory | |
| 2019 | "Angels We Have Heard on High" | non-album single | |

== Honors ==
- Nominated for Best New Artist for 2009 Visionary Awards by the Christian Music Hall of Fame
- Nominated for New Artist of the Year Dove Award at the 39th GMA Dove Awards.
