= List of Filipino male actors =

This is a list of Filipino male actors in stage, film, and television.

== A ==
- Aaron Agassi (born March 29, 1988)
- Abel Estanislao (born May 9, 1995)
- Abra (born December 9, 1990)
- Ace Vergel (November 20, 1954–December 15, 2007)
- Adrian Alandy (born February 7, 1980)
- Adrian Lindayag (born May 8, 1995)
- Aga Muhlach (born August 12, 1969)
- Ahron Villena (born March 10, 1987)
- AJ Dee (born July 27, 1982)
- AJ Muhlach (born May 20, 1992)
- AJ Perez (February 17, 1993–April 17, 2011)
- Akira Morishita (born April 27, 2001)
- Al Tantay (born March 15, 1956)
- Alas Alvarez (born March 28, 2001)
- Albert Martinez (born April 19, 1961)
- Albie Casiño (born May 14, 1993)
- Alden Richards (born January 2, 1992)
- Alex Castro (born September 27, 1985)
- Alex Diaz (born July 21, 1993)
- Alex Medina (born May 26, 1986)
- Alfie Anido (December 30, 1959–December 30, 1981)
- Alfonso Martinez (born May 19, 1988)
- Alfred Labatos (born June 30, 1992)
- Alfred Vargas (born October 24, 1981)
- Aljon Mendoza (born July 16, 2001)
- Aljur Abrenica (born March 24, 1990)
- Allan K. (born December 13, 1958)
- Allan Paule (born December 24, 1963)
- Allen Ansay (born November 23, 2003)
- Allen Dizon (born October 3, 1977)
- Alonzo Muhlach (born February 19, 2010)
- Alvin Anson (born October 20, 1962)
- Alvin Aragon (born October 28, 1989)
- Alwyn Uytingco (born February 11, 1988)
- Amado Cortez (December 14, 1927–March 22, 2003)
- Ambet Nabus (born February 12, 1970)
- Andoy Balunbalunan (January 18, 1909–September 8, 1999)
- Andre Garcia (born October 23, 1999)
- Andre Paras (born November 1, 1995)
- Andrei Felix (born May 22, 1983)
- Andres Centenera (March 15, 1914–July 7, 1984)
- Andres Muhlach (born November 5, 2001)
- Andrew E. (born July 30, 1967)
- Andy Poe (May 14, 1943–September 5, 1995)
- Angelo de Castro, Jr. (March 6, 1945–April 5, 2012)
- Anjo Damiles (born May 10, 1996)
- Anjo Yllana (born April 24, 1968)
- Anthony Alonzo (April 2, 1948–October 9, 1998)
- Anthony Constantino (born May 30, 2002)
- Anthony Rosaldo (born February 1, 1994)
- Antonio Aquitania (born January 16, 1977)
- Apeng Daldal (October 12, 1928–February 9, 1992)
- April Boy Regino (April 9, 1961–November 29, 2020)
- Archie Alemania (born March 6, 1978)
- Ariel Rivera (born September 1, 1966)
- Ariel Ureta (born November 5, 1946)
- Arjo Atayde (born November 5, 1990)
- Arman Salon (unknown born)
- Armando Goyena (December 7, 1922–March 9, 2011)
- Arnel Ignacio (born March 14, 1964)
- Arno Morales (born June 18, 1993)
- Arron Villaflor (born July 5, 1990)
- Arsenio Bautista (May 9, 1923–September 5, 2019)
- Arthur Solinap (born January 19, 1980)
- Ate Gay (born August 12, 1971)
- Atom Araullo (born October 19, 1982)
- Atoy Co (born October 15, 1951)
- Aurelio Umali (born January 25, 1966)
- Avery Paraiso (born September 22, 1994)
- Awra Briguela (born March 26, 2004)

== B ==
- Babalu (June 29, 1942–August 27, 1998)
- Bailey May (born August 6, 2002)
- Balang (born November 7, 2008)
- Baldo Marro (January 1, 1948–October 22, 2017)
- Balot (March 22, 1926–November 27, 1996)
- Bangkay (May 4, 1947–November 6, 2018)
- Baron Geisler (born June 5, 1982)
- Bassilyo (born December 11, 1977)
- Baste (born August 22, 2012)
- Bayani Agbayani (born January 3, 1969)
- Bayani Casimiro, Jr. (August 15, 1967—July 25, 2025)
- Bayani Casimiro, Sr. (July 16, 1918–February 27, 1989)
- Bearwin Meily (born April 4, 1977)
- Bembol Roco (born November 20, 1953)
- Benedict Campos (born January 2, 1989)
- Benj Manalo (born July 30, 1995)
- Benjamin Alves (born March 31, 1989)
- Benjamin Besa (born June 12, 1989)
- Benjie Paras (born October 2, 1968)
- Bentong (January 12, 1964–February 9, 2019)
- Bentot (July 13, 1920–June 19, 1986)
- Bernard Bonnin (September 8, 1938–November 21, 2009)
- Bernard Palanca (born December 3, 1976)
- Bernardo Bernardo (January 28, 1945–March 8, 2018)
- Bert "Tawa" Marcelo (October 17, 1936–March 27, 2018)
- Berting Labra (April 17, 1933–February 10, 2009)
- Betong Sumaya (born November 21, 1972)
- Biboy Ramirez (born July 20, 1981)
- Billy Crawford (born May 16, 1982)
- Bimby Aquino Yap (born April 19, 2007)
- Bing Davao (1959/1960–December 20, 2025)
- Bing Leonardia (born July 10, 1952)
- BJ Forbes (born March 27, 1998)
- Blakdyak (July 25, 1969–November 21, 2016)
- Bob dela Cruz (born August 10, 1977)
- Bob Jbeili (unknown born)
- Bobby Andrews (born November 30, 1976)
- Boboy Garovillo (born October 10, 1951)
- Bodjie Pascua (born March 2, 1955)
- Bomber Moran (October 18, 1944–August 14, 2004)
- Bonel Balingit (born November 30, 1967)
- Bong Revilla (born September 25, 1966)
- Boobay (born November 7, 1986)
- Boom Labrusca (born December 2, 1976)
- Boy Abunda (born October 29, 1955)
- Boy Alano (March 20, 1941–July 23, 2022)
- Boy Logro (born June 29, 1954)
- Brace Arquiza (born December 12, 2000)
- Brad Turvey (born March 10, 1978)
- Brenan Espartinez (born February 18, 1986)
- Brent Manalo (born December 6, 1997)
- Brod Pete (born May 21, 1958)
- Bruce Roeland (born November 3, 2004)
- Bryan Benedict (born September 27, 1993)
- Buboy Villar (born March 21, 1998)
- Bugoy Cariño (born September 3, 2002)
- Butz Aquino (May 20, 1939 l–August 17, 2015)
- Byron Ortile (born August 24, 2002)

== C ==
- Cachupoy (July 12, 1932–January 1, 2008)
- Carding Castro (July 13, 1935–November 14, 2003)
- Carl John Barrameda (born October 12, 1993)
- Carl Cervantes (born November 27, 1994)
- Carl Guevara (born September 9, 1988)
- Carlo Aquino (born September 3, 1985)
- Carlo Gonzales (born August 14, 1983)
- Carlo Muñoz (born February 24, 1978)
- Carlos Agassi (born December 12, 1979)
- Carlos Padilla Jr. (born April 19, 1934)
- Carlos Padilla Sr. (September 6, 1909–March 8, 1964)
- Carlos Salazar (October 26, 1931–April 7, 2022)
- Cedrick Juan (born June 26, 1990)
- Cesar Montano (born August 1, 1962)
- César Ramírez (July 9, 1925–July 18, 2003)
- Chad Kinis (born April 22, 1986)
- Charles Gemora (June 15, 1903 – August 19, 1961)
- Charlie Davao (October 7, 1934–August 8, 2010)
- Chesster Chay (born August 21, 1989)
- Chiquito (March 12, 1932–July 2, 1997)
- Chito Miranda (born February 7, 1976)
- Chokoleit (June 25, 1970–March 9, 2019)
- Chris Cayzer (born December 29, 1986)
- Chris Gutierrez (born May 9, 1992)
- Christian Bables (born December 6, 1992)
- Christian Bautista (born October 19, 1981)
- Christian Vasquez (born February 7, 1977)
- Christopher de Leon (born October 31, 1956)
- Chuck Allie (born June 2, 1988)
- Chuckie Dreyfus (born August 7, 1974)
- CJ Muere (born February 18, 1988)
- CJ Navato (born September 13, 1996)
- CJ Ramos (born March 30 1987)
- Clarence Delgado (born December 15, 2004)
- Clifford Gaw (born July 7, 2006)
- Coco Martin (born November 1, 1981)
- Cocoy Laurel (March 2, 1953 – June 14, 2025)
- Cogie Domingo (born August 15, 1985)
- Conrado Conde (November 25, 1911–March 6, 1992)
- Cris Daluz (August 15, 1934–February 12, 2009)
- Cris de Vera (March 13, 1924–July 17, 1975)
- Cris Villanueva (born May 23, 1971)
- CX Navarro (born June 23, 2006)

== D ==
- Dagul (born October 5, 1958)
- Dale Baldillo (born October 6, 2000)
- Dan Alvaro (born October 7, 1957)
- Daniel Fernando (born May 12, 1962)
- Daniel Matsunaga (born November 28, 1988)
- Daniel Padilla (born April 26, 1995)
- Danilo Fernandez (born January 14, 1966)
- Danny Javier (August 6, 1947—October 31, 2022)
- Dante Rivero (born August 5, 1946)
- Dante Varona (born September 6, 1953)
- Dar Bernardo (born April 14, 1992)
- Darren Espanto (born May 24, 2001)
- Daryl Ong (born March 24, 1987)
- Dave Bornea (born February 23, 1995)
- David Licauco (born June 15, 1994)
- Dencio Padilla (September 2, 1928–October 10, 1997)
- Dennis Padilla (born February 9, 1962)
- Dennis Trillo (born May 12, 1981)
- Dentrix Ponce (unknown born)
- Derek Ramsay (born December 7, 1976)
- Derrick Monasterio (born August 1, 1995)
- Dick Israel (December 10, 1947–October 11, 2016)
- Diego Castro III (born November 30, 1975)
- Diego Gutierrez (born November 11, 1996)
- Diego Llorico (born July 20, 1971)
- Diego Loyzaga (born May 21, 1995)
- Diether Ocampo (born July 19, 1974)
- Dingdong Avanzado (born July 7, 1968)
- Dingdong Dantes (born August 2, 1980)
- Dino Imperial (born April 9, 1988)
- Diomedes Maturan (August 16, 1940–April 7, 2002)
- Dion Ignacio (born March 28, 1986)
- DJ Durano (born August 17, 1974)
- DM Sevilla (born January 29, 1987)
- Dolphy (July 25, 1928–July 10, 2012)
- Dominic Ochoa (born August 4, 1974)
- Dominic Roco (born April 12, 1989)
- Dominic Roque (born July 20, 1990)
- Don Pepot (born November 6, 1933–January 18, 2022)
- Dong Puno (January 20, 1946–February 15, 2022)
- Donny Pangilinan (born February 10, 1998)
- Doug Kramer (born July 10, 1983)
- Drew Arellano (born January 16, 1980)
- Dustin Yu (born May 13, 2002)

== E ==
- Eddie Arenas (July 7, 1935–March 31, 2003)
- Eddie del Mar (October 13, 1919–November 8, 1986)
- Eddie Garcia (May 2, 1929–June 20, 2019)
- Eddie Gutierrez (born January 6, 1942)
- Eddie Mercado (August 20, 1938–September 18, 2006)
- Eddie Mesa (born February 18, 1940)
- Eddie Rodriguez (August 23, 1932–October 12, 2001)
- Edgar Allan Guzman (born April 16, 1984)
- Edgar Mortiz (born August 30, 1954)
- Edu Manzano (born September 14, 1955)
- Edward Barber (born July 15, 2000)
- Edwin San Juan (born February 24, 1969)
- Efren "Bata" Reyes (born August 26, 1954)
- Efren Reyes Jr. (born June 25, 1961)
- Efren Reyes Sr. (June 18, 1924–February 11, 1968)
- EJ Jallorina (born November 12, 1993)
- Ejay Falcon (born November 18, 1989)
- Elijah Canlas (born August 16, 2000)
- Elmo Magalona (born April 27, 1994)
- Ely Buendia (born November 2, 1970)
- Emilio Daez (born March 10, 2000)
- Emman Abeleda (born September 17, 1989)
- Emman Nimedez (April 3, 1998–August 16, 2020)
- Empoy Marquez (born July 3, 1981)
- Enchong Dee (born November 5, 1988)
- Enrico Cuenca (born December 7, 1991)
- Enrique Gil (born March 30, 1992)
- Enzo Osorio (born June 26, 2009)
- Enzo Pelojero (unknown born)
- Enzo Pineda (born August 12, 1990)
- Epy Quizon (born January 23, 1973)
- ER Ejercito (born October 5, 1963)
- Eric dela Cruz (born November 20, 1981)
- Eric Fructuoso (born March 31, 1976)
- Eric Nicolas (unknown born)
- Eric Quizon (born January 20, 1967)
- Erik Santos (born October 10, 1982)
- Ervic Vijandre (born January 26, 1986)
- Esnyr Ranollo (born December 15, 2001)
- Euwenn Mikaell (born January 14, 2013)

== F ==
- Felix Roco (born April 12, 1989)
- Fernando Poe Jr. (August 20, 1939–December 14, 2004)
- Fernando Poe Sr. (November 27, 1916–October 23, 1951)
- Fonz Nartia (unknown born)
- Francis M. (October 4, 1964–March 6, 2009)
- Francis Magundayao (born May 14, 1999)
- Franco Hernandez (April 1, 1991–November 11, 2017)
- Frank Magalona (born December 19, 1987)
- Frank G. Rivera (born February 29, 1948)
- Franzen Fajardo (born April 18, 1982)
- Fred Cortes (December 4, 1921–May 23, 1964)
- Fred Panopio (February 2, 1939–April 22, 2010)
- Fred Payawan (born March 12, 1989)
- Freddie Webb (born November 24, 1942)

== G ==
- Gab Valenciano (born June 11, 1988)
- Gabby Concepcion (born November 5, 1964)
- Gabby Eigenmann (born March 2, 1978)
- Gardo Versoza (born July 8, 1969)
- Garth Garcia (unknown born)
- Gary Estrada (born May 16, 1971)
- Gary Valenciano (born August 6, 1964)
- Gelo Rivera (born April 18, 2001)
- Geoff Eigenmann (born March 23, 1985)
- Geoff Taylor (born May 26, 1986)
- George Estregan (July 10, 1939– August 8, 1988)
- Gerald Anderson (born March 7, 1989)
- Gerald Santos (born May 15, 1991)
- Gerardo de León (September 12, 1913–July 25, 1981)
- German Moreno (October 4, 1933–January 8, 2016)
- Gian Magdangal (born November 18, 1981)
- Gian Sotto (born March 18, 1978)
- Gil Cuerva (born August 21, 1995)
- Gil de León (February 11, 1916–October 15, 1991)
- Gino Antonio (unknown born)
- Gino Padilla (born March 1, 1964)
- Gio Alvarez (born November 18, 1976)
- Gloc-9 (born October 19, 1977)
- Grae Fernandez (born November 7, 2001)
- Greggy Liwag (unknown born)
- Guji Lorenzana (born May 11, 1980)

== H ==
- Hajji Alejandro (December 26, 1954–April 21, 2025)
- Harvey Bautista (born August 16, 2003)
- Hayden Kho (born May 20, 1980)
- Heath Jornales (born May 5, 2009)
- Herbert Bautista (born May 12, 1968)
- Hermes Bautista (born February 7, 1986)
- Herminio Bautista (May 20, 1934 – February 12, 2017)
- Hero Angeles (born December 8, 1984)
- Hiro Peralta (born November 7, 1994)

== I ==
- Ian Pangilinan (born September 9, 1997)
- Ian Veneracion (born February 7, 1975)
- IC Mendoza (born January 14, 1988)
- Ice Seguerra (born September 17, 1983)
- Igi Boy Flores (born July 31, 1995)
- Ike Lozada (July 5, 1943–March 8, 1995)
- Iñigo Pascual (born September 14, 1997)
- Ion Perez (born November 27, 1990)
- Ishmael Bernal (September 30, 1938–June 2, 1996)
- Isko Moreno (born October 24, 1974)
- Ivan Dorschner (born September 21, 1990)
- Izzy Canillo (born March 3, 2004)

== J ==
- Jace Flores (born November 15, 1988)
- Jacob Benedicto (born April 29, 1992)
- Jaime dela Rosa (September 18, 1921 – December 2, 1992)
- Jaime Fabregas (born February 28, 1950)
- Jairus Aquino (born April 1, 1999)
- Jak Roberto (born December 2, 1993)
- Jake Cuenca (born December 30, 1987)
- Jake Ejercito (born March 27, 1990)
- Jake Roxas (born July 13, 1977)
- Jake Vargas (born July 9, 1992)
- Jake Zyrus (born May 10, 1992)
- James Blanco (born June 15, 1981)
- James Graham (born August 5, 2006)
- James Reid (born May 11, 1993)
- James Sagarino (unknown born)
- James Teng (born February 3, 1998)
- James Wright (born 1992)
- Jameson Blake (born June 17, 1997)
- Jan Manual (born January 13, 1986)
- Jan Nieto (born June 13, 1981)
- Janno Gibbs (born September 16, 1969)
- Janus del Prado (born November 19, 1984)
- Jao Canlas (born December 26, 2002)
- Jao Mapa (born February 11, 1976)
- Japoy Lizardo (born June 8, 1986)
- Jason Abalos (born January 14, 1985)
- Jason Dy (born June 19, 1990)
- Jason Francisco (born October 11, 1987)
- Jay Arcilla (born May 21, 1996)
- Jay Durias (born August 26, 1975)
- Jay Gonzaga (born October 23, 1988)
- Jay Ilagan (January 20, 1955–February 4, 1992)
- Jay Manalo (born January 30, 1973)
- Jay Ortega (born January 8, 2002)
- Jaypee de Guzman (born April 20, 1978)
- Jay-R Siaboc (born January 21, 1987)
- Jay-R Sillona (born February 1, 1981)
- Jayson Gainza (born April 27, 1980)
- JB Magsaysay (born July 6, 1980)
- JC Alcantara (born January 23, 2000)
- JC Bonnin (born February 2, 1968)
- JC de Vera (born March 10, 1986)
- JC Santos (born November 19, 1988)
- JC Tiuseco (born April 16, 1985)
- Jeff Moses (born April 1, 2000)
- Jerald Napoles (born March 2, 1983)
- Jeremiah Lisbo (born November 27, 1997)
- Jeremy Glinoga (born September 14, 1999)
- Jeric Gonzales (born August 7, 1992)
- Jeric Raval (born 1961)
- Jeric Teng (born March 18, 1991)
- Jericho Rosales (born September 22, 1979)
- Jerome Ponce (born June 4, 1995)
- Jeron Teng (born March 21, 1994)
- Jess Lapid, Jr. (born March 22, 1962)
- Jess Lapid, Sr. (October 5, 1933–July 13, 1968)
- Jestoni Alarcon (born January 10, 1964)
- Jett Pangan (born June 21, 1968)
- Jeyrick Sigmaton (born February 15, 1994)
- Jhong Hilario (born August 11, 1976)
- Jim Paredes (born August 30, 1951)
- Jim Pebanco (unknown born)
- Jimboy Martin (born October 12, 1997)
- Jimmy Santos (born October 8, 1951)
- Jin Macapagal (born July 29, 1995)
- Jinggoy Estrada (born February 17, 1963)
- Jiro Manio (born May 8, 1992)
- JK Labajo (born February 5, 2001)
- JM de Guzman (born September 9, 1988)
- Joao Constancia (born December 22, 1996)
- Joaquin Domagoso (born October 24, 2001)
- Joel Torre (born June 19, 1961)
- Joem Bascon (born August 29, 1986)
- Joey de Leon (born October 14, 1946)
- Joey Marquez (born October 7, 1957)
- Joey Paras (February 7, 1978–October 29, 2023)
- Johan Santos (born June 1, 1987)
- John Apacible (January 22, 1973–March 20, 2011)
- John Arcilla (born June 24, 1966)
- John Vic De Guzman (born September 23, 1993)
- John Estrada (born June 13, 1973)
- John Feir (born December 26, 1968)
- John James Uy (born September 13, 1987)
- John Lapus (born July 7, 1973)
- John Lloyd Cruz (born June 24, 1983)
- John Manalo (born September 6, 1995)
- John Medina (born September 5, 1985)
- John Prats (born February 14, 1984)
- John Regala (September 12, 1967 – June 3, 2023)
- John Wayne Sace (born May 9, 1989)
- Johnny Delgado (February 28, 1948–November 19, 2009)
- Johnny Manahan (born February 11, 1947)
- Jojo Alejar (born June 19, 1966)
- Joko Diaz (born April 26, 1976)
- Jolo Revilla (born March 15, 1988)
- Jomari Yllana (born August 16, 1976)
- Jon Avila (born September 1, 1985)
- Jon Gutierrez (born October 6, 1995)
- Jon Hernandez (October 9, 1969–November 11, 2007)
- Jon Lucas (born August 18, 1995)
- Jon Timmons (born February 21, 1991)
- Joonee Gamboa (born August 7, 1936)
- Joross Gamboa (born November 28, 1984)
- Jose de Villa (c. 1922–July 25, 1997)
- Jose Mari Gonzales (July 26, 1938 – April 16, 2019)
- Jose Manalo (born February 12, 1966)
- Jose Padilla Jr. (July 16, 1911–June 18, 1979)
- Jose Javier Reyes (born October 21, 1954)
- Josef Elizalde (born May 28, 1990)
- Joseph Bitangcol (born March 28, 1984)
- Joseph Ejercito Estrada (born April 19, 1937)
- Joseph Marco (born October 4, 1988)
- Josh Ford (born March 12, 2005)
- Josh Santana (born June 18, 1983)
- Joshua Colet (born January 4, 1995)
- Joshua Dionisio (born December 14, 1994)
- Joshua Garcia (born October 7, 1997)
- Jovit Baldivino (October 16, 1993–December 9, 2022)
- JR Valentin (born February 9, 1982)
- Juan Rodrigo (born January 9, 1961)
- Juancho Trivino (born April 13, 1993)
- Julian Alturas (born October 13, 2001)
- Julian Estrada (born January 15, 1996)
- Julian Trono (born October 2, 1944)
- Julio Diaz (born November 18, 1958)
- Jun Aristorenas (May 7, 1933–July 18, 2000)
- Jun Sabayton (born November 23, 1973)
- Júnior (September 10, 1943–April 15, 2014)
- Junix Inocian (March 17, 1951–June 13, 2015)
- Justin Cuyugan (born October 11, 1980)
- Justin de Dios (born July 7, 1998)
- Justine Luzares (unknown born)
- JV Kapunan (born July 23, 1990)
- Jhanz Audley Narit (born September 29, 2008)

== K ==
- KC Montero (born June 17, 1978)
- KD Estrada (born May 3, 2002)
- Kean Cipriano (born June 11, 1987)
- Keempee de Leon (born January 8, 1973)
- Kelvin Miranda (born January 8, 1999)
- Ken Alfonso (born February 20, 1990)
- Ken Chan (born January 17, 1993)
- Kenneth Medrano (born May 9, 1991)
- Ketchup Eusebio (born September 9, 1985)
- Kevin Santos (born June 15, 1988)
- Kevin Vernal (born 1981)
- Khalil Ramos (born January 22, 1996)
- Khryss Adalia (October 2, 1946 – October 13, 2008)
- Kian Kazemi (born January 26, 1986)
- Kidlat Tahimik (born October 3, 1942)
- Kier Legaspi (born January 1, 1973)
- Kiko Estrada (born June 4, 1994)
- Kiko Matos (born September 22, 1990)
- Kim Atienza (born January 24, 1967)
- Kim Last (born January 20, 1997)
- King Girado (born April 13, 1985)
- Kit Thompson (born February 15, 1997)
- Kobie Brown (born October 12 2003)
- Koko Trinidad (October 10, 1915–January 21, 2001)
- Kokoy de Santos (born May 15, 1998)
- Kris Lawrence (born September 1, 1985)
- Kristoffer Martin (born November 20, 1994)
- Kurt Perez (born December 1, 1997)
- Kyle Alandy Amor (unknown born)
- Kyle Echarri (born June 20, 2003)

== L ==
- LA Lopez (born June 1, 1985)
- LA Santos (born January 27, 2000)
- Lance Busa (born December 16, 1994)
- Lance Carr (born October 22, 2000)
- Lance Lucido (born February 27, 2007)
- Lance Serrano (born May 22, 1990)
- Larry Silva (October 21, 1937–April 27, 2004)
- Lassy Marquez (born October 31, 1976)
- Lauro Delgado (December 10, 1932–January 15, 1978)
- Lav Diaz (born December 30, 1958)
- Leandro Muñoz (born March 25, 1976)
- Leo Consul (born August 27, 1987)
- Leo Martinez (born March 7, 1945)
- Leon Miguel (born December 17, 1968)
- Leopoldo Salcedo (March 12, 1912–June 11, 1998)
- Lester Llansang (born July 3, 1985)
- Lito Calzado (January 20, 1946–November 11, 2011)
- Lito Camo (born March 12, 1972)
- Lito Lapid (born October 25, 1955)
- Lito Legaspi (September 10, 1941–September 8, 2019)
- Lito Pimentel (born May 27, 1963)
- Lloyd Samartino (born February 2, 1963)
- Lloyd Zaragoza (born November 1, 1982)
- Long Mejia (born in 1962)
- Lou Salvador (July 7, 1905–March 1, 1973)
- Lou Salvador Jr. (December 4, 1940–April 19, 2008)
- Lou Veloso (born January 7, 1948)
- Louise Abuel (born December 27, 2003)
- Lucas Andalio (born July 4, 2018)
- Lucho Ayala (born March 28, 1992)
- Lui Villaruz (born December 10, 1979)
- Luis Gonzales (June 21, 1928–March 15, 2012)
- Luis Manzano (born April 21, 1981)

== M ==
- Manny Castañeda (1948–June 30, 2024)
- Manny Pacquiao (born December 17, 1978)
- Manolo Pedrosa (born October 20, 1997)
- Manuel Barbeyto (March 20, 1902–July 24, 1994)
- Manuel Chua (born October 29, 1980)
- Marc Abaya (born November 6, 1979)
- Marc Justine Alvarez (born March 18, 2005)
- Marco Alcaraz (born July 12, 1983)
- Marco Gallo (born January 3, 2001)
- Marco Gumabao (born August 14, 1994)
- Marco Masa (born August 1, 2007)
- Marco Morales (born July 16, 1982)
- Marco Sison (born July 10, 1957)
- Marcus Cabais (born August 31, 2009)
- Mari Kaimo (born January 21, 1960)
- Mario Barri (born September 17, 1928–November 25, 1971)
- Mario Montenegro (July 25, 1928–August 27, 1988)
- Mark Bautista (born August 10, 1983)
- Mark Anthony Fernandez (born January 18, 1979)
- Mark Gil (September 25, 1961–September 1, 2014)
- Mark Herras (born December 14, 1986)
- Mark Lapid (born February 16, 1980)
- Mark Luz (born February 8, 1988)
- Markki Stroem (born March 21, 1987)
- Markus Paterson (born June 30, 1998)
- Marky Cielo (May 12, 1988–December 7, 2008)
- Marlo Mortel (born January 4, 1993)
- Martin Escudero (born April 11, 1990)
- Martin del Rosario (born August 21, 1992)
- Martin Nievera (born February 5, 1963)
- Marvin Agustin (born January 29, 1979)
- Marx Topacio
- Mat Ranillo III (born October 5, 1956)
- Matt Daclan (Unknown born)
- Matt Evans (born October 22, 1988)
- Matteo Guidicelli (born March 26, 1990)
- Mavy Legaspi (born January 6, 2001)
- Max Alvarado (February 19, 1929–April 6, 1997)
- Maxie Andreison (born October 15, 1998)
- McCoy de Leon (born February 20, 1995)
- Mcoy Fundales (born November 3, 1977)
- Mel Martinez (born November 13, 1974)
- Menggie Cobarrubias (August 10, 1953–March 26, 2020)
- Miah Tiangco (born August 5, 1997)
- Michael de Mesa (born May 24, 1960)
- Michael Roy Jornales (born March 16, 1984)
- Michael Pangilinan (born November 27, 1995)
- Michael Sager (born February 5, 2003)
- Michael V. (born December 17, 1969)
- Mickey Perz (born June 1, 1984)
- Mico Aytona (born June 22, 1988)
- Mig Macario (born March 16, 1970)
- Miggs Cuaderno (born August 8, 2004)
- Miggy Jimenez (born January 23, 1999)
- Miggy Tolentino (born April 20, 1996)
- Migo Adecer (born December 20, 1999)
- Miguel Odron (unknown born)
- Miguel Rodriguez (November 5, 1954 – February 14, 2005)
- Miguel Tanfelix (born September 21, 1998)
- Miguel Vergara (born August 26, 2007)
- Mikael Daez (born January 6, 1988)
- Mike de Leon (May 24, 1947–August 28, 2025)
- Mike Tan (born December 31, 1986)
- Mikee Lee (born January 19, 1990)
- Mikel Campos (born July 29, 1986)
- Mikey Bustos (born June 23, 1981)
- Miko Palanca (February 3, 1978–December 9, 2019)
- Miko Sotto (May 10, 1982–December 29, 2010)
- Mikoy Morales (born December 11, 1993)
- Minggoy Lopez (August 12, 1912 – January 20, 1981)
- Minióng Álvarez (October 15, 1917–June 23, 1983)
- Mitoy Yonting (born January 5, 1970)
- Mo Mitchell (born January 30, 2002)
- Mo Twister (born October 19, 1977)
- Mon Confiado (born March 19, 1968)
- Monsour del Rosario (born May 11, 1965)
- Mura (born March 26, 1969)

== N ==
- Nar Cabico (born September 16, 1990)
- Narding Anzures (November 10, 1928–March 14, 1989)
- Nash Aguas (born October 10, 1998)
- Nash Ang
- Nathan Lopez (born August 19, 1991)
- Nathaniel Britt (born August 11, 2000)
- Negi (born December 5, 1979)
- Neil Coleta (born August 4, 1991)
- Neil Perez (born July 26, 1985)
- Neil Ryan Sese (born April 26, 1979)
- Nemesio E. Caravana (April 10, 1901–September 29, 1982)
- Nestor de Villa (July 6, 1928–February 21, 2004)
- Ney Dimaculangan (born December 15, 1981)
- Nico Antonio (born May 25, 1983)
- Nigel Paul Villarete (born September 18, 1962)
- Nikko Natividad (born February 13, 1993)
- Nino Alejandro (born July 22, 1976)
- Niño Muhlach (born October 27, 1971)
- Noel Cabangon (born December 25, 1963)
- Noel Comia Jr. (born May 29, 2004)
- Noel Rosal (born January 2, 1964)
- Noel Trinidad (born 1940)
- Nonie Buencamino (born November 28, 1966)
- Nonong Ballinan (born March 3, 1987)
- Nonoy Zuñiga (born May 4, 1953)
- Nyoy Volante (born January 25, 1978)

== O ==
- Ogie Alcasid (born August 27, 1967)
- Ogie Diaz (born January 2, 1970)
- OJ Mariano (born February 20, 1981)
- Oliver Aquino (born April 26, 1989)
- Onemig Bondoc (born May 12, 1977)
- Onyok Pineda (born October 1, 2010)
- Onyok Velasco (born January 10, 1974)
- Orestes Ojeda (January 3, 1956−July 27, 2021)
- Orlando Nadres (November 6, 1938–July 14, 1991)
- Orlando Sol (born December 10, 1987)
- Oscar Obligacion (January 21, 1924–February 2, 2010)
- Oyo Boy Sotto (born January 12, 1984)

== P ==
- Palito (September 4, 1933–April 12, 2010)
- Panchito Alba (February 5, 1925–December 18, 1995)
- Pancho Magalona (January 22, 1922–April 7, 1998)
- Pancho Magno (born October 2, 1986)
- Paolo Ballesteros (born November 29, 1982)
- Paolo Bediones (born March 17, 1974)
- Paolo Contis (born March 14, 1984)
- Paolo Montalban (born May 21, 1973)
- Paolo Onesa (born October 12, 1993)
- Paolo Serrano (born August 17, 1987)
- Paquito Diaz (May 28, 1937–March 3, 2011)
- Patrick Garcia (born September 14, 1981)
- Paul Artadi (born May 5, 1981)
- Paul Salas (born April 16, 1998)
- Paulo Angeles (born October 27, 1997)
- Paulo Avelino (born May 13, 1988)
- Pekto (born June 14, 1973)
- Pen Medina (born August 27, 1950)
- Pepe Diokno (born August 13, 1987)
- Pepe Herrera (born April 21, 1987)
- Pepe Pimentel (April 30, 1929–January 25, 2013)
- Pepito Rodriguez (October 18, 1942 – February 26, 2026)
- Peque Gallaga (August 25, 1943–May 7, 2020)
- Petite (born May 26, 1976)
- Philip Joper Escueta (born August 23, 1993)
- Philip Salvador (born August 22, 1953)
- Philip Supnet (May 26, 1959–December 22, 2025)
- Phytos Ramirez (born July 18, 1995)
- Pidi Barzaga (March 25, 1950–April 27, 2024)
- Ping Medina (born July 23, 1983)
- Pío del Pilar (July 11, 1860–June 21, 1931)
- Piolo Pascual (born January 12, 1977)
- Polo Ravales (born June 27, 1982)
- Pooh (born December 15, 1974)
- Prince Stefan (born February 13, 1989)
- Prince Villanueva (born August 21, 1998)
- Prospero Luna (April 20, 1934–July 23, 2010)
- Pugo (July 12, 1910–December 12, 1978)

== R ==
- R-Ji Lim (born November 8, 1999)
- Rabin Angeles (born November 14, 2004)
- Race Matias (born June 21, 1997)
- Rafael Rosell (born November 10, 1982)
- Raikko Mateo (born July 31, 2008)
- Raimund Marasigan (born May 22, 1971)
- Rainier Castillo (born October 21, 1985)
- Ralph de Leon (born August 30, 2000)
- Ram Chaves (born December 16, 1983)
- Ram Revilla (February 12, 1988–October 29, 2011)
- Ramil Hernandez (born July 26, 1972)
- Ramil Rodriguez (August 22, 1944–April 29, 2014)
- Ramon Aquino (August 31, 1917–March 31, 1993)
- Ramon Bagatsing (August 19, 1916–February 14, 2006)
- Ramon Bagatsing, Jr. (born January 25, 1950)
- Ramon Barba (August 31, 1939–October 10, 2021)
- Ramon Bautista (born May 20, 1985)
- Ramon d'Salva (October 18, 1921–March 1, 2015)
- Ramon Jacinto (born June 3, 1945)
- Ramon Obusan (June 16, 1938–December 21, 2006)
- Ramon Revilla, Sr. (June 16, 1938–December 21, 2006)
- Ramon Zamora (June 27, 1935–August 26, 2007)
- Randy Santiago (born November 26, 1960)
- Raneo Abu (born October 28, 1970)
- Ranz Kyle (born May 6, 1997)
- Raoul Aragon (unknown born)
- Raven Rigor (born January 30, 2003)
- Ray Ventura (January 3, 1944–October 24, 2001)
- Raymart Santiago (born July 20, 1973)
- Raymond Bagatsing (born September 15, 1967)
- Raymond Gutierrez (born January 21, 1984)
- Raymond Lauchengco (born November 29, 1964)
- Rayver Cruz (born July 20, 1989)
- Red Sternberg (May 30, 1974 – May 27, 2025)
- Redford White (December 5, 1955–July 25, 2010)
- Renato de Villa (born July 20, 1935)
- Renato del Prado (March 17, 1940–November 1, 2013)
- Rendon Labador (unknown born)
- Rene Hawkins (March 28, 1944–May 10, 2014)
- Rene Requiestas (January 23, 1957–July 24, 1993)
- Renz Fernandez (born September 8, 1985)
- Renz Valerio (born November 10, 1998)
- Renzo Cruz (unknown born)
- Rey "PJ" Abellana (born September 2, 1962)
- Rey Malonzo (born May 17, 1952)
- Rey Nambatac (born January 27, 1994)
- Rey Valera (born May 4, 1954)
- Reynaldo Dante (March 13, 1912–February 10, 1985)
- Rez Cortez (born January 4, 1956)
- Rhap Salazar (born February 3, 1997)
- Rhene Imperial (born February 15, 1950)
- Ric Bustamante (January 26, 1923–May 29, 1995)
- Ric Segreto (September 27, 1952–September 6, 1998)
- Ricardo Brillantes (March 28, 1912–November 12, 1961)
- Ricardo Mirasol (July 15, 1923–May 1, 2001)
- Ricci Rivero (born May 25, 1998)
- Richard Gomez (born April 7, 1966)
- Richard Gutierrez (born January 22, 1984)
- Richard Juan (born August 2, 1992)
- Richard Quan (born June 11, 1970)
- Richard Reynoso (born October 16, 1969)
- Richard Yap (born May 18, 1967)
- Ricky Belmonte (December 24, 1947–October 3, 2001)
- Ricky Carandang (born September 2, 1967)
- Ricky Davao (March 23, 1961 – May 1, 2025)
- Ricky Lee (born March 19, 1948)
- Ricky Lo (April 21, 1946–May 4, 2021)
- Ricky Reyes (born April 12, 1950)
- Rico Barrera (born December 29, 1984)
- Rico Blanco (born March 17, 1973)
- Rico J. Puno (February 13, 1953–October 30, 2018)
- Rico Robles (unknown born)
- Rico Yan (March 14, 1974–March 29, 2002)
- Ritche Lago Bautista (born June 14, 1977)
- River Joseph (born January 3, 1999)
- RJ Jimenez (born September 17, 1983)
- RJ Nieto (born January 26, 1985)
- RJ Padilla (born January 22, 1989)
- RJ Rosales (March 4, 1974–December 4, 2011)
- RK Bagatsing (born May 9, 1988)
- Rob Gomez (born March 23, 1998)
- Robby Navarro (born September 17, 1979)
- Robert Arevalo (May 6, 1938–August 10, 2023)
- Robert Bolick (born September 13, 1995)
- Robert Campos (February 18, 1940–July 8, 2015)
- Robert Jaworski (born March 8, 1946)
- Roberto Pagdanganan (born July 19, 1946)
- Robi Domingo (born September 27, 1989)
- Robin Aristorenas (born April 11, 1964)
- Robin Padilla (born November 23, 1969)
- Rocco Nacino (born March 23, 1987)
- Rod Navarro (March 10, 1930 – April 13, 2005)
- Rodel Batocabe (April 25, 1966–December 22, 2018)
- Rodel Naval (February 16, 1953–June 11, 1995)
- Rodel Tapaya (born July 10, 1980)
- Roderick Paulate (born April 4, 1960)
- Rodil Zalameda (born August 2, 1963)
- Rodjun Cruz (born October 10, 1987)
- Roel Cortez (July 30, 1967–April 1, 2015)
- Rogelio dela Rosa (November 12, 1916–November 26, 1986)
- Roger Pogoy (born June 16, 1992)
- Roi Vinzon (born September 20, 1953)
- Roland Dantes (June 15, 1940–March 16, 2009)
- Rolando Tinio (March 5, 1937 – July 7, 1997)
- Rolando Uy (born July 5, 1954)
- Roldan Aquino (May 2, 1942–March 10, 2014)
- Roman Romulo (born February 28, 1967)
- Romeo Vasquez (April 9, 1939–May 2, 2017)
- Rommel Padilla (born January 5, 1965)
- Romnick Sarmenta (born April 28, 1972)
- Romy Diaz (November 28, 1940–May 10, 2005)
- Ron Henley (born May 20, 1987)
- Ron Josol (born August 2, 1974)
- Ron Macapagal (born April 27, 1998)
- Ronald Corveau (unknown born)
- Ronald Humarang (born December 15, 1994)
- Ronaldo Aquino (December 5, 1961– March 8, 2021)
- Ronaldo Valdez (November 27, 1947 – December 17, 2023)
- Ronnel Rivera (born September 1, 1971)
- Ronnie Alonte (born October 26, 1996)
- Ronnie Henares (born February 8, 1955)
- Ronnie Lazaro (born November 14, 1957)
- Ronnie Liang (born January 31, 1985)
- Ronnie Ricketts (born May 26, 1965)
- Ronwaldo Martin (born July 14, 1997)
- Ross Rival (October 7, 1945–November 16, 2007)
- Rowell Santiago (born November 11, 1963)
- Roy Alvarez (March 23, 1950 – February 11, 2014)
- Roy Padilla Sr. (March 4, 1926 – January 17, 1988)
- Royce Cabrera (born September 6, 1996)
- RR Herrera (unknown born)
- Ruben Gonzaga (born March 16, 1982)
- Ruben Padilla (born January 5, 2001)
- Ruben Rustia (July 25, 1923–April 7, 1994)
- Ruben Maria Soriquez (born August 2, 1971)
- Ruben Tagalog (October 18, 1922–March 5, 1985)
- Rudy Concepcion (January 29, 1912–September 19, 1960)
- Rudy "Daboy" Fernandez (March 3, 1952–June 7, 2008)
- Rudy Hatfield (born September 13, 1977)
- Rudy Robles (April 29, 1910–August 11, 1970)
- Ruel Vernal (born September 8, 1946)
- Ruru Madrid (born December 4, 1997)
- Ryan Agoncillo (born April 10, 1979)
- Ryan Bang (born June 16, 1991)
- Ryan Cayabyab (born May 4, 1946)
- Ryan Eigenmann (born October 3, 1978)
- Ryan Ramos (born November 5, 1985)
- Ryan Rems (born November 3, 1978)

== S ==
- Sam Concepcion (born October 17, 1992)
- Sam Milby (born May 23, 1984)
- Sancho delas Alas (born January 30, 1991)
- Sandino Martin (born October 12, 1991)
- Sandro Muhlach (born June 14, 2001)
- Sef Cadayona (born March 3, 1989)
- Sergio Garcia (born April 10, 1990)
- Seth Fedelin (born July 9, 2002)
- Sid Lucero (born March 12, 1981)
- Simon Ibarra (born January 24, 1968)
- Sky Quizon (born October 5, 1997)
- Slater Young (born December 19, 1987)
- Smokey Manaloto (born April 24, 1971)
- Sol Eugenio (born March 11, 1972)
- Soliman Cruz (unknown born)
- Sonny Parsons (August 22, 1958–May 10, 2020)
- Soxie Topacio (June 19, 1952–July 21, 2017)
- Spanky Manikan (March 22, 1942–January 14, 2018)
- Stefano Mori (born January 16, 1985)
- Steven Silva (born November 27, 1986)
- Subas Herrero (April 3, 1943–March 14, 2013)
- Super Tekla (born January 13, 1982)

== T ==
- Tado Jimenez (March 24, 1974–February 7, 2014)
- Taneo Sebastian (born May 31, 2000)
- Ted Failon (born March 29, 1962)
- Teddy Benavídez (unknown born)
- Teddy Corpuz (born December 4, 1978)
- Teejay Marquez (born September 29, 1993)
- Teody Belarmino (May 18, 1922–January 22, 1984)
- Terence Baylon (born April 26, 1984)
- Thou Reyes (born March 28, 1985)
- Tim Yap (born January 17, 1977)
- Timmy Chipeco (born April 6, 1975)
- Tino de Lara (August 1, 1917–September 30, 1998)
- Tirso Cruz III (born April 1, 1952)
- Tito Arevalo (March 29, 1911–December 4, 2000)
- Tito Sotto (born August 24, 1948)
- TJ Trinidad (born January 22, 1976)
- Togo (November 30, 1905–November 3, 1952)
- Tom Olivar (born April 26, 1963)
- Tom Rodriguez (born October 1, 1987)
- Tommy Abuel (born September 16, 1942)
- Tommy Alejandrino (born August 24, 2001)
- Tommy Esguerra (born June 5, 1994)
- Tonton Gutierrez (born September 11, 1964)
- Tony Ferrer (June 12, 1934–January 23, 2021)
- Tony Labrusca (born August 7, 1995)
- Tony Meloto (born January 17, 1950)
- Tony Santos, Sr. (April 10, 1920—February 7, 1988)
- Topel Lee (unknown born)
- Tristan Ramirez (born January 19, 1993)
- Troy Montero (born July 30, 1977)
- Tyron Perez (September 14, 1985–December 29, 2011)

== V ==
- Val Sotto (born March 23, 1945)
- Van Roxas (born November 8, 1989)
- Vandolph Quizon (born May 8, 1984)
- Vhong Navarro (born January 4, 1977)
- Vic Diaz (July 29, 1932–September 15, 2006)
- Vic Silayan (January 31, 1929–August 30, 1987)
- Vic Sotto (born April 28, 1954)
- Vic Vargas (March 28, 1939–July 19, 2003)
- Vice Ganda (born March 31, 1976)
- Victor Basa (born June 6, 1985)
- Victor Neri (born February 19, 1976)
- Victor Silayan (born August 6, 1992)
- Victor Wood (February 1, 1946–April 23, 2021)
- Vin Abrenica (born May 27, 1991)
- Vince Gamad (born January 15, 1994)
- Vince Maristela (born March 7, 2000)
- Vincent Magbanua (born April 7, 2000)

== W ==
- Wally Bayola (born May 3, 1972)
- Wendell Ramos (born August 18, 1978)
- Weng Weng (September 7, 1957–August 29, 1994)
- Wil Dasovich (born August 26, 1991)
- Wilbert Ross (born June 17, 1997)
- Will Ashley (born September 17, 2002)
- Will Devaughn (born February 27, 1982)
- William Martinez (born May 31, 1966)
- Willie Revillame (born January 27, 1961)
- Wincy Aquino Ong (born February 4, 1982)
- Wowie de Guzman (born September 22, 1976)

== X ==
- Xian Lim (born July 12, 1989)

== Y ==
- Yamyam Gucong (born December 8, 1993)
- Yasser Marta (born July 28, 1996)
- Yong Gopez (born October 24, 1992)
- Young JV (born July 23, 1990)
- Yoyoy Villame (November 18, 1932–May 18, 2007)
- Yuan Francisco (born February 11, 2010)
- Yul Servo (born February 21, 1978)
- Yves Flores (born November 26, 1994)

== Z ==
- Zaijian Jaranilla (born August 23, 2001)
- Zaldy Zshornack (December 30, 1937–November 18, 2002)
- Zanjoe Marudo (born July 23, 1982)
- Zoren Legaspi (born January 31, 1972)
- Zymic Jaranilla (born May 20, 2004)

== See also ==
- List of Filipino current child actors
- List of Filipino former child actors
