= Good Vibes (Philippine TV series) =

2011 Philippine television drama series

- Title card
- Genre: Teen drama
- Created by: ABS-CBN Studios
- Directed by: Theodore Boborol; Laurenti M. Dyogi; Nico Hernandez
- Starring: Sam Concepcion; Enrique Gil
- Opening theme: "All I Need Is Love" by Bret Jackson
- Ending theme: "Good Vibes" by Vice Ganda
- Country of origin: Philippines
- Original language: Filipino
- No. of episodes: 22

Production
- Production location: Philippines
- Running time: 60 minutes

Original release
- Network: ABS-CBN
- Release: April 3 – August 28, 2011

Good Vibes is a 2011 Philippine television drama teen dance musical anthology series broadcast by ABS-CBN. Directed by Theodore Boborol, Laurenti M. Dyogi and Nico Hernandez, it stars Sam Concepcion and Enrique Gil. It premiered on April 3, 2011 on the network's Yes Weekend line up. The show concluded on August 28, 2011, with a total of 22 episodes.

== Synopsis ==
Good Vibes follows half-brothers Marc Pedroza and Troy Cabrera, whose lives are brought together after Marc discovers that his father, Nestor, has a son from another relationship who has been orphaned.

Marc is a high-achieving student who is expected to become his class valedictorian and serves as president of his school's dance troupe. His life changes when Troy moves into their home, forcing the two half-brothers to adjust to living together.

Their relationship becomes strained when Troy is blamed for the dance troupe's disqualification from an interschool competition, while Marc chooses not to defend him. Despite their differences, the two must find a way to work together as they pursue their shared passion for dancing.

== Cast and characters ==
Cast

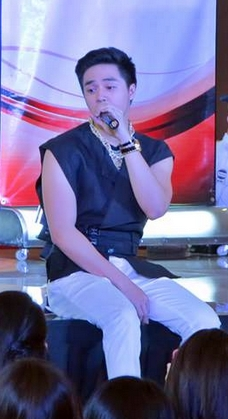
Sam Concepcion

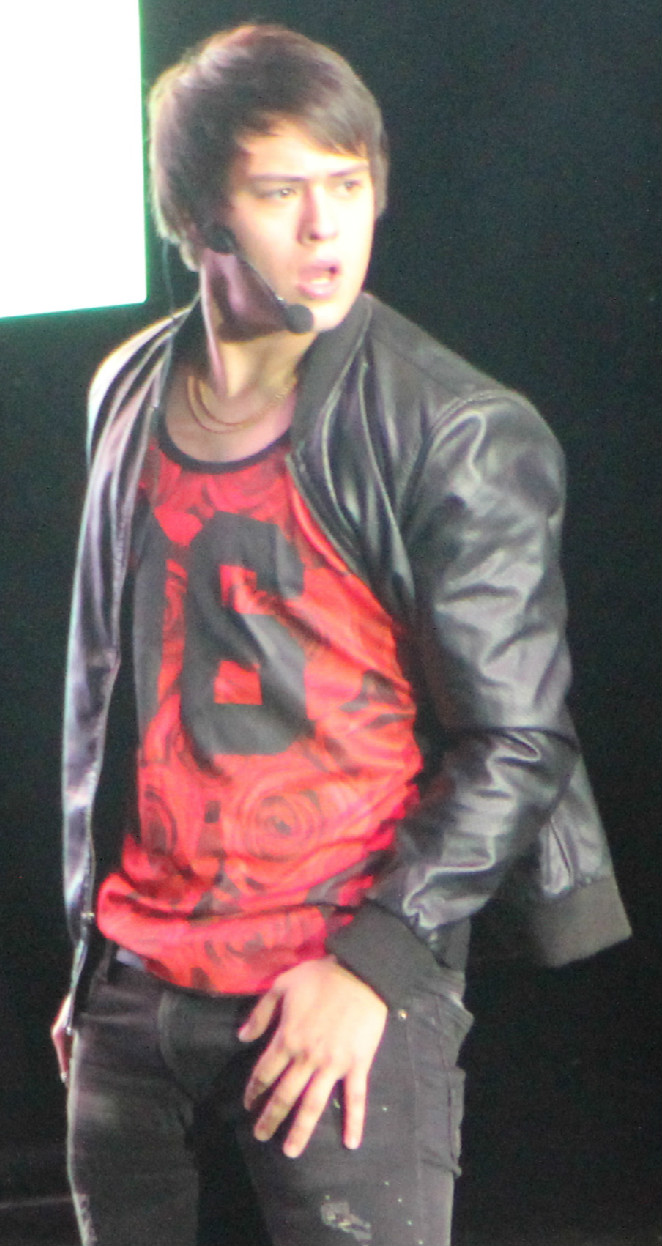
Enrique Gil

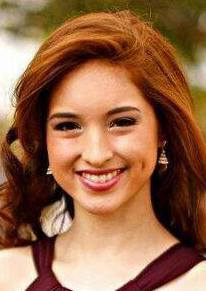
Coleen Garcia

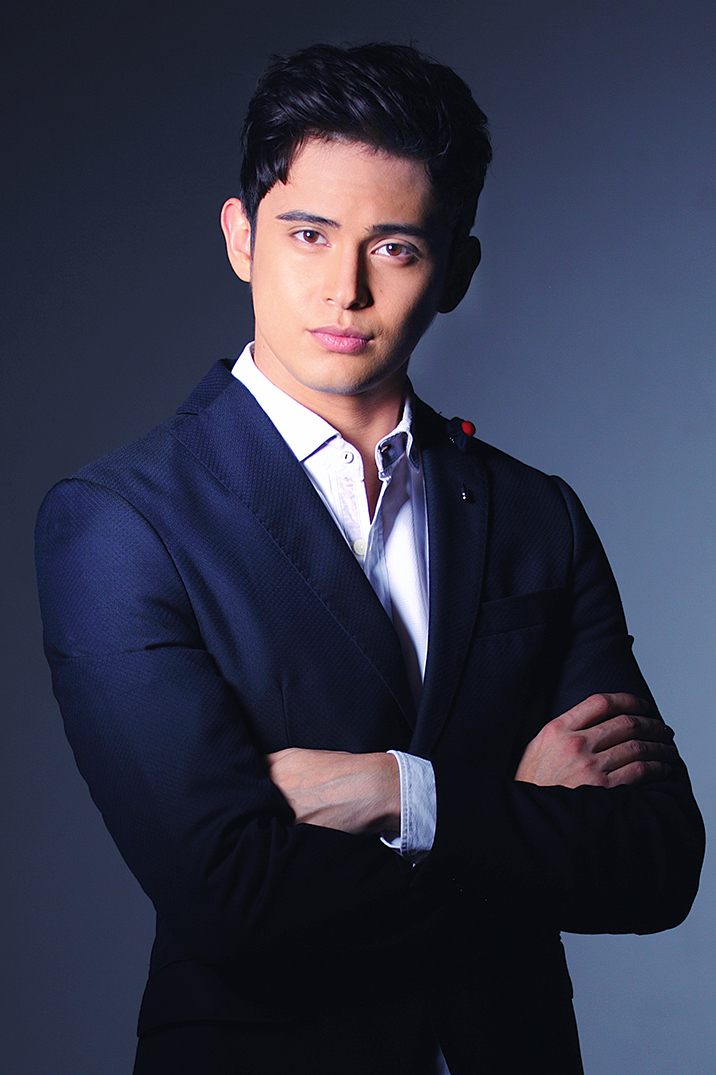
James Reid

Lead cast

- Sam Concepcion as Marc Pedroza
- Enrique Gil as Troy Cabrera

Main cast

- Arron Villaflor as Franco Mendoza/Marc
- Coleen Garcia as Monique Castillejo
- Yen Santos as Dayanara "Ara" Gonzales
- James Reid as Spencer Ziff
- Devon Seron as Maribeth Tamayo
- Linn Oeymo as Geleen Weiss
- Ivan Dorschner as Gabriel Weiss
- Kazel Kinouchi as Lea Carlos
- Heide Reigo as Jamie Sarmiento
- Chikara Nawa as Wowie Ogiya

Supporting cast

- Dominic Ochoa as Nestor Pedroza
- Yayo Aguila as Amanda Pedroza
- Kristel Moreno as Carmi Pedroza
- Maribeth Bichara as Alexandra Torres
- Sandy Aloba as Ms. Moreno
- April Sun as Annie
- Joe Vargas as Danilo
- Eslove Briones as Jhong
- Nel Gomez as Ralion
- Justin Gonzales as Rob
- Arnold Reyes as Melchor Tamayo
- Kalila Aguilos as Anna
- Che Ramos as Charlene Weiss
- Kyra Custodio as Saicy
- RR Enriquez as Gracia
- Patrick Sugui as Dino
- I.A. Dela Cruz as Ayie

Guest cast

- Farrah Florer as Troy Cabrera's mother
- Ann Li as Lucy Ledesma
- Javy Gil as himself

== Ratings ==
According to Kantar Media, the pilot episode of Good Vibes, received a 9.7% rating.
