= Shoutout! =

Philippine television variety show

- Title card
- Genre: Teen idol Variety show
- Directed by: Johnny Manahan
- Presented by: Erich Gonzales; Enchong Dee; Robi Domingo; Sam Concepcion; Empress Schuck
- Opening theme: "Shoutout!"
- Country of origin: Philippines
- Original language: Tagalog
- No. of seasons: 2
- No. of episodes: 55

Production
- Production locations: Quezon City, Philippines
- Running time: 30 minutes

Original release
- Network: ABS-CBN
- Release: November 29, 2010 – February 11, 2011

Shoutout! is a Philippine television teen variety show broadcast by ABS-CBN. Hosted by Erich Gonzales, Enchong Dee, Robi Domingo, Sam Concepcion, Arron Villaflor, and Empress Schuck, it premiered on November 29, 2010. The show concluded on February 11, 2011, with a total of 55 episodes.

== Hosts ==
Hosts

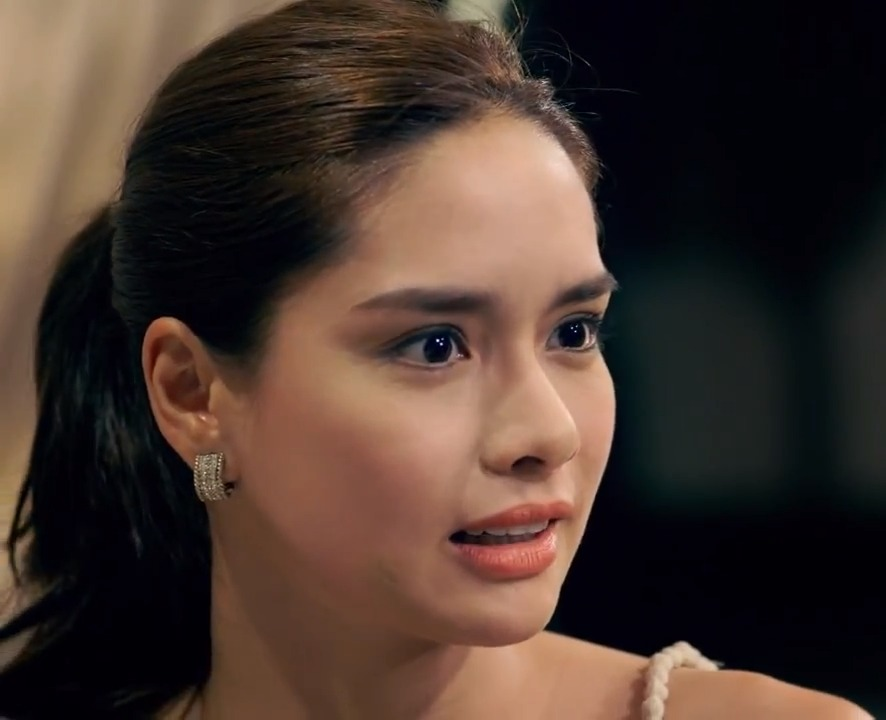
Erich Gonzales

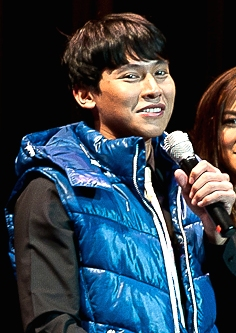
Enchong Dee

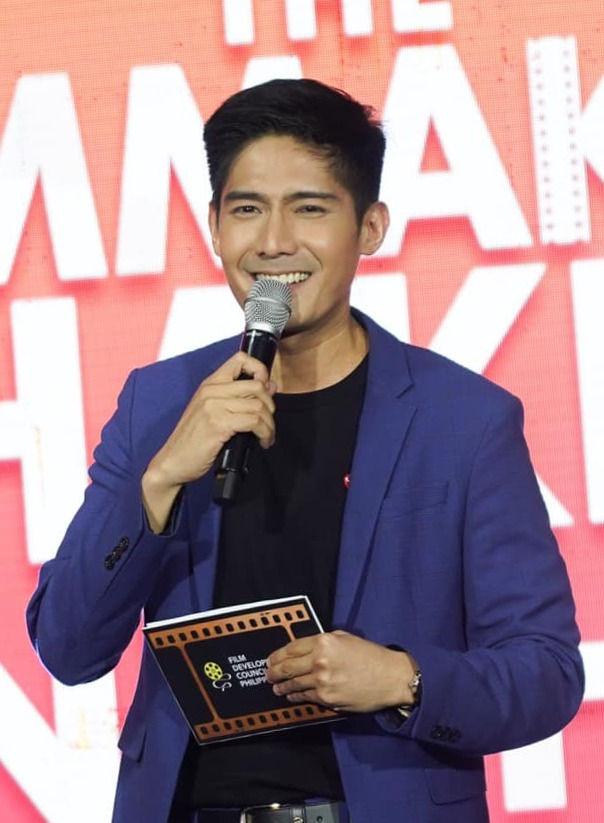
Robi Domingo

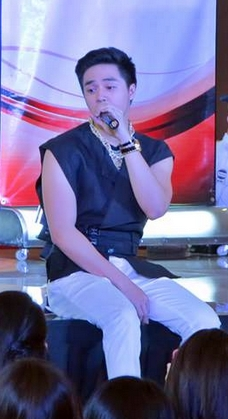
Sam Concepcion

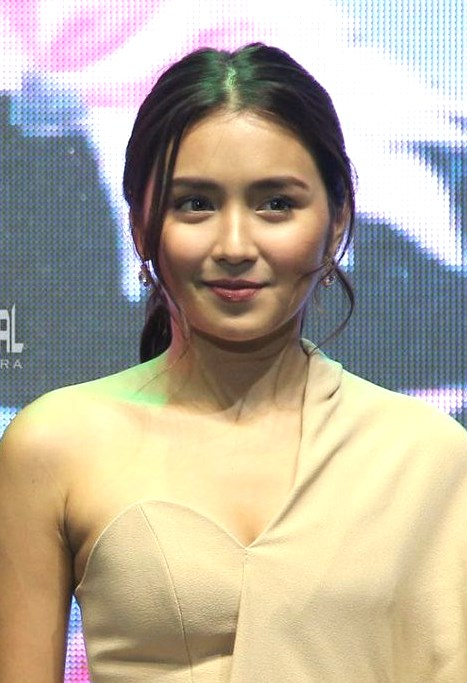
Kathryn Bernardo

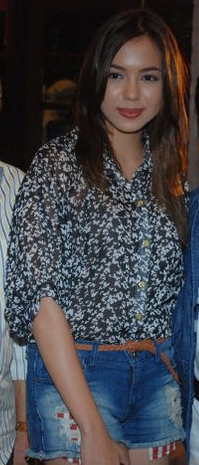
Julia Montes

- Erich Gonzales
- Enchong Dee
- Robi Domingo
- Sam Concepcion
- Empress Schuck
- Arron Villaflor
- Enrique Gil (Season 1)

Mondeerrifics

- Ryan Bang
- Jenny Kim
- Julia Montes
- Makisig Morales
- Rhap Salazar
- Ann Li
- Tippy Dos Santos
- Aria Clemente
- Patrick Sugui
- Mica Roy Torre

Tuesdelicious

- James Reid
- Joe Vargas
- Devon Seron
- James Torres
- Kyle Alandy Amor
- Mica Caldito
- Auriette Divina
- Emmanuelle Vera
- Inno Martin
- Piero Vergara

Miyerkulitz

- Kathryn Bernardo
- Jane Oineza
- Miles Ocampo
- Mikylla Ramirez
- John Manalo
- Paul Salas
- Sue Ramirez

Friends-Thurs

- Ivan Dorschner
- Nel Gomez
- Tricia Santos
- JV Kapunan
- Jaco Benin
- Thara Jordana
- Yen Santos
- Benjamin de Guzman
- Bianca Casado
- Linn Oeymo
- Hannah Flores

Guest casts

- Neil Coleta

== Reformat ==
In January 2011, Shoutout! underwent a major reformat following concerns about the program's performance. In a taped episode aired on January 21, ABS-CBN Senior Vice President for TV Entertainment Linggit Tan gave the cast a month to improve the program before its possible cancellation.

The program subsequently adopted a more reality television-oriented format and was renamed Shoutout Level Up. The previous teen groups—Monderrifics, Tuesdelicious, Miyerkulitz, and Friends-Thurs—were discontinued and replaced by three new teams: Team For The Win, Team Overload, and Team Up. Enrique Gil, who had previously served as one of the main hosts, was reassigned as a regular teenmate.

Under the new format, members of each team auditioned for the production number assigned to their respective day. Those who passed the auditions were given the opportunity to perform with their team. Team For The Win performed on Mondays, Team Overload on Tuesdays, and Team Up on Wednesdays. During the following two weeks, individual and group performances were presented on separate days. In the final week, the Wednesday and Thursday episodes focused on teenmates who had received little or no opportunity to perform.

=== Team For The Win (FTW) ===
The team was originally known as Team Coolelats before being renamed Team For The Win.

- Kathryn Bernardo
- Makisig Morales
- Inno Martin
- Hannah Flores
- Auriette Divina
- Jaco Benin
- Mikylla Ramirez
- Julia Montes
- John Manalo
- Bret Jackson
- Enrique Gil
- Kyle Alandy Amor

Kathryn Bernardo, John Manalo, and Julia Montes left the program during the second week of the reformat because of conflicts with their Mara Clara tapings.

=== Team Overload ===
- Nel Gomez
- Mica Caldito
- Devon Seron
- James Reid
- Tippy Dos Santos
- Miles Ocampo
- Paul Salas
- Sue Anna Ramirez
- Aria Clemente
- Linn Oeymo
- Joe Vargas
- Ann Li

Joe Vargas left the program during the second week of the reformat because of taping conflicts with Mutya.

=== Team Up ===
- Rhap Salazar
- Emman Vera
- Piero Vergara
- Benjamin de Guzman
- Jane Oineza
- Thara Jordana
- Ryan Bang
- Jenny Kim
- Young JV
- Bianca Casado
- Ivan Dorschner
- Patrick Sugui
- Yen Santos
- James Torres

Yen Santos and Piero Vergara left the program during the second week of the reformat because of taping conflicts with Mutya. Ryan Bang subsequently left because of his other television commitments, while Jenny Kim left to focus on her studies.

== Cancellation ==
Shoutout! was cancelled earlier than originally expected to make way for new programming, including The Price Is Right.

== Ratings ==
According to Kantar Media/TNS, the pilot episode of Shoutout earned a 15.4% rating. The final episode of the program as Shoutout Level Up received an 8.5% rating.

== Accolades ==
Accolades received by Shoutout!
Year	Award	Category	Recipient	Result	Ref.
2011	PMPC Star Awards for Television	Best Variety Show	Shoutout!	Nominated	
