= Ann Li (businesswoman) =

Filipino -Taiwanese businesswoman and fashion influencer

- 李怜宜 (Li Lyn Yee)
- Born: Ann Louie; January 17, 1995 (age 31); Bangkok, Thailand
- Other names: Ann Louie Li; Li Yi-Shuan
- Occupations: Businesswoman; editor; television personality; photographer; fashion designer; actress
- Website: annlouieli.com

Ann Louie Li (born January 17, 1995, in Bangkok, Thailand), popularly known as Ann Li, is a Filipino–Taiwanese businesswoman, fashion influencer, former actress, model, photographer, and television personality. She splits her time between Manila, Taipei, and Paris. Her accolades include being the first recipient of the Shorty Award for best in fashion on social media and being the youngest (at 22) to be featured on Forbes 30 Under 30 Asia list for the arts. Often dubbed by publications such as Vogue, L'Officiel, Preview and more as an It girl and a Multi-Hyphenate.

In 2012, Li started a photography blog called AnnSnaps that turned into a lifestyle platform Ann Louie Li in 2016. Its website functioned as a webzine. Vogue Taiwan announced her as an official Insider on July 15, 2017, for the publication. She debuted AnnSpeaks on Vogue, the spin-off to AnnSnaps where instead of focusing on just photography, she speaks about her personal life. She is also a contributor for Vogue Beauty Taiwan where her blog was launched and is currently the first and only bilingual blog on Vogue.

In 2017, she founded Chrysogem, a wholesale distribution company selling high quality chrysocolla to high jewellery brands.

== Early life ==
Li was born in Bangkok, Thailand to a Taiwanese businesswoman and former singer mother and a Filipino-Chinese businessman and engineer father. She grew up in the Philippines and later moved to Paris, France after receiving a full scholarship to attend IFA Paris. She uses her mother's last name (Li) and her father's last name (Louie) as her middle name for personal reasons. As a child, she attended the Southville International School and Colleges in the Philippines until the age of 14 where she decided she wanted to be homeschooled and pursue figure skating. She graduated high school (secondary school) at the age of only 15.

== Career in television and acting ==
=== Television ===
Li was a Teenternational Housemates of a Pinoy reality show in ABS-CBN Pinoy Big Brother: Teen Clash 2010 as the Diligent Daughter of Taiwan. She entered the Pinoy Big Brother house on Day 22 as one of the "Teenternational" housemates. After the first set of housemates was merged into one group in one half of the house, Big Brother picked another set of teenagers to live in the other half. Li was part of that set, composed of teenagers who weren't pure Filipinos. Li was evicted from the Pinoy Big Brother house on Day 75, being the last housemate to get evicted on the show. One of the things that caught viewers' attention during Li's run on the show was her friendship with James Reid. She and Reid have a very devoted fanbase called the JamLi Poppers, who would throw lavish parties in their idols' honor. In 2010, James Reid's first interview on The Buzz, he was asked by Boy Abunda, Kris Aquino and KC Conception who he wanted to be paired with for his future projects. He answered "Honestly, Ann" which became a popular phrase among the Jamli Poppers. A few fan books inspired by the pair were released, including the Fan Fiction "Honestly, Ann". The most famous one called "To the Beach" by Anna Ida.

She was a part of Mondeerrifics group on Shoutout!, and later called Shoutout: Level Up! (teen variety show) on ABS-CBN.

She had a special participation role on GoodVibes series in 2011. Playing the role of Lucy Ledesma, the famous celebrity who was linked to Spender Ziff.

She also starred in 2 episodes of Maynila, a Filipino drama anthology that has been broadcast on Philippine television since 1999 in GMA Network. Maynila: Queen's Secret', where she played the role of Queen Bee, Reina Gil along with Ivan Dorschner and Tricia Santos. "Maynila: Bored to Love" where she played the role of Jenna, a college student who was never contented with her boyfriend's efforts. Her boyfriend was played by Bret Jackson.

On July 24, 2011, Li together with Fretzie Bercede were featured in James Reid and Bret Jackson's original song "Can't Dance" released under Star Records. They launched their first digital album entitled We Are Whatever on ASAP Rocks.

=== Stage play ===
Li starred in a stage play with Patrick Sugui. She plays the role of Alicia, the leading lady who is about to be married to her longtime boyfriend, Pepito. Basketball Fight is the title and it is directed by Mel Magno. November 19, 2011, the first showing date of the play at SM Sta. Mesa.

== Career in fashion ==
At the age of 14, she started to design her own costumes for her figure skating competition but it wasn't until Pinoy Big Brother Teen Clash 2010 that she really got to express and share her passion for designing. One of the tasks that the housemates were given was to deconstruct Von Dutch's ready-to-wear collection where Li did all the styling and directed the runway show that was aired on ABS-CBN, where their team (Teenternationals) were given 2 extra slots for the Big Night instead of having only 4 winners, their season had 6. Li led them to winning the task which made history in Big Brother. The same year, she walked for the Jelly Bean show in Philippines Fashion Week and started her clothing line called DNA.

She debuted in a cotillion dance as a Teen Artist of Star Magic Batch 2010. Arriving at the Star Magic Ball, accompanied by her date Ivan Dorschner, she wore a designer gown and later changed to one of her own designs for the after party. She attended the 2011 Star Magic Ball in her own design with her date, her good friend, Jenny Kim. She's been attending the annual ball in her own designs since then.

Li walked in the Candie's show at Philippine Fashion Week in 2011.

In 2011, she worked as a fashion intern for Bang Pineda while taking a short course in fashion design at a local fashion institute. During Li's weekends, she helped the crew style the celebrity guests for the variety show ASAP. At times when she is invited as a guest herself, she would be working as a stylist and as a performer for the show. During her internship she also went to New York City and Seattle with the crew for International Fashion Tour. She was also a finalist for TeenVogue's Rouge Coco Shine Hydrating Sheer Lipshine video competition for Chanel.

In 2012, she started her blog to document her fashion endeavors.

In 2013, Li was chosen and photographed by Leslie Kee for his 15th Anniversary photo book called "Super Love" as one of the 500 well-known artists, dancers, creators, actors, models and other personalities dressed in a single scarf, drawn from the exclusive "Comme des Carrés" collaborative collection jointly produced by Hermès and Comme des Garçons' Rei Kawakubo. She also worked for Roberto Cavalli, Imane Ayisi and Emanual Ungaro as an intern during Paris Fashion Week while on other days she'd be seen on front rows at shows like Elie Saab, Ralph and Russo, and Issey Miyake. Since then she has done editorial shoots and collaborated with brands such as Calvin Klein, Marimekko, and Kenzo.

In 2015, the Grand Hyatt, Singapore, invited Li to show her perspective of "Living Grand", where she attended the Chinese New Year event wearing a modern QiPao look that she deconstructed.

== Achievements ==
The Shorty Awards, hailed as the Oscars of Twitter by The New York Times, announced the winners in 36 categories March 28, 2011, in New York City. Li took home the award for fashion, presented by Aasif Mandvi, emerging as the winner with the most votes out of 1,861 nominees, which include One Direction member, Harry Styles, Demi Lovato, Selena Gomez, Taylor Swift and other Hollywood celebrities. Li was nominated again for the same category "Fashion" on the 4th annual Shorty Awards in 2013.

On October 1, 2011, Li won the title "Ultimate Female Teen Fashionista" in a poll site "Piece of Speaks" a blog confirms a straight to the point topics about Philippines favorite actors and actresses which Li earn 2,548 votes. Li beats 5 contenders for the Ultimate Teen Fashionista. It is quoted on the blog that Li won because she has her own style with an aura of a princess and most of her outfits and dresses are unique in her own ways.

After winning as Piece of Speak's Ultimate Female Teen Fashionista. On October 4, 2011, Li also won the title "Most Popular Teen Star of 2011" with 181,325 total points out from poll votes, Facebook likes and comment posting by "EnteRvrexWorld", an Ultimate Philippines entertainment poll site.

Li became part of the list of Top 100 Philippine Artists of 2011. The result of voting was revealed in the day of January 4, 2012. She made it to top 96 in the site "EnteRvrexWorld".

Li was featured in the June 2016 issue of Vogue Taiwan, where she is hailed as the "It girl" of the season. She was introduced as the 21-year-old who is part of Facebook's million fan club.

L'Officiel Manila included her in the list of 'From East to West: 9 Filipinas Taking The Fashion World By Storm' and wrote 'we dare to ask: what else is this 21-year old capable of?' because of her achievements in the Fashion Industry. She relaunched her website as a webzine on June 19, 2016.

In 2017, Forbes magazine listed Li on their "30 Under 30" Asia List under "The Arts" and is the youngest on the list at 22. She is also among the youngest in the category "Celebrities" alongside Lorde, Margot Robbie, Kris Wu, etc. On July 17, 2017, it was announced by Forbes on and share by Li that she would be attending the Summit in Manila, Philippines. She was invited by Forbes as a notable participant and panelist during the Under 30 Summit where she spoke about "Art as a Medium for Change". She was appointed as a judge for Miss World Philippines 2017 which aired on GMA Network on September 3, 2017. She also presented the award for Multimedia where she awarded Laura Lehmann who won the title and proceeded to be crowned Miss World Philippines 2017.

== Television ==
| Year | Title | Role | Notes |
|---|---|---|---|
| 2011 | Maynila: Queen's Secret | Reina Gil | Lead Role |
| 2011 | Good Vibes | Lucy Ledesma | Special Participation |
| 2011 | Maynila: Bored to Love | Jenna Villafuerteh | Lead Role |
| 2011 | ASAPXV | Herself | Guest Performer |
| 2011 | Happy Yipee Yehey! | Herself | Contestant |
| 2011 | Showtime (TV series) | Herself | Guest |
| 2011 | Myx: Star Myx | Herself | Guest Myx VJ |
| 2011 | Shoutout!: Level Up | Herself | Regular Teen Performer/ Co-Host |
| 2010 | Shoutout! | Herself | Regular Teen Performer/ Co-Host |
| 2010 | ASAP | Herself | Guest Performer |
| 2010 | Simply KC | Herself | Guest |
| 2010 | Pinoy Big Brother: Unite at the Big Night | Herself | Guest/ Co-Host |
| 2010 | Pinoy Big Brother: Teen Clash 2010 | Herself | Contestant |

== Honors, Awards and Nominations ==
| Year | Association | Category | Result | Ref |
|---|---|---|---|---|
| 2012 | Shorty Awards 'Twitter Oscars' | Best Fashion on Social Media | Nominated | |
| 2011 | Shorty Awards 'Twitter Oscars' | Best Fashion on Social Media | Won | |
| 2010 | ASAP XV Pop Viewers Choice Awards | Tween Popsies (Shared with James Reid) | Won | |

• 2017 Forbes 30 Under 30 Asia List 'The Arts'

• 2017 Forbes 30 Under 30 Asia List 'Celebrities'

== Charity ==
Li set up a Facebook page in 2010 and made an online auction of her famous "yellow bunny hoodie". The money out of these will be given to Lola Vita and Lola Lourdes, the two elderly people from Hospicio de San Jose who visited the Pinoy Big Brother house. In January 2011, Li visited Lola Vita and Lola Lourdes at the Hospicio de San Jose and celebrated a pre 16th birthday party with her fans. Li's clothing brand (DNA) then sponsored a charity foundation (Future Faces Manila) during their runway event where she styled the models wearing her clothing brand and walked on the runway herself.

Li is named the founding ambassador of IMPCT, where she held an online contest to let her followers take part in spreading the importance of education by taking a creative photograph and posting it on their social handles. IMPCT won the 2015 Hult Prize awarded by former President of the United States, Bill Clinton.

== See also ==
- Taiwanese art
