= Ramil Rodriguez =

Filipino actor

- Born: Rene Emilio Moreno Rodriguez; August 22, 1940; San Fernando, Pampanga, Commonwealth of the Philippines
- Died: April 30, 2014 (aged 73); Makati, Metro Manila, Philippines
- Occupation: Actor
- Years active: 1960–2010
- Spouse: Lettie
- Relatives: Pepito (brother)

Rene Emilio Moreno Rodriguez (August 22, 1940 – April 29, 2014), better known as Ramil Rodriguez, was a veteran actor in the Philippines. He was a matinee idol in 1960s and one of the famous Sampaguita Pictures Stars '66.

In 1966, he was proclaimed the Prince of Philippine Movies (sponsored by Bulaklak Magazine).

== Career ==
Ramil Rodriguez along with his brother Pepito became contract actors for Sampaguita Pictures through their connection with Pepito Vera Perez kaya, the son of studio head Jose Perez. The brothers were given screen tests.

He was introduced in Leron, Leron Sinta (1964) starring Susan Roces, Eddie Gutierrez and Liberty Ilagan. Shirley Moreno and Ramil appeared together in Bye-Bye Na Sa Daddy (1965), Gintong Recuerdo (1965), and Ang Lagay 'Adre... Ay Under-istanding! (1966).

Sampaguita Pictures, launched 10 new faces packaged as Stars '66. The Stars '66 were composed of Dindo Fernando, Bert Leroy, Jr., Pepito Rodriguez, Edgar Salcedo, Rosemarie Sonora, Gina Pareño, Loretta Marquez, Shirley Moreno and Blanca Gomez. The Stars 66 did movies Maraming Kulay ang Pag-ibig (1966) and Jamboree '66 (1966).

He became a full-fledged actor in Kulay Rosas Ang Pag-ibig (1968) opposite Susan Roces.

As veteran actor, he performed more than 110 movies and television shows from 1960.

== Personal life ==
Ramil Rodriguez was the eldest among six children. His oldest younger brother Pepito was also an actor.

== Death ==
Rodriguez died on April 29, 2014 due to lung cancer.

== Filmography ==
Film

- Palanca (1960)
- Libis ng Baryo (1964)
- Paano Kita Lilimutin? (1965)
- Mama! (1966)
- Sitting in the Park (1967)
- Kulay Rosas ang Pag-ibig (1968)
- Paula (1969)
- Ako'y Tao, May Dugo at Laman! (1970)
- Innamorata (1973)
- Isang Gabi... Tatlong Babae! (1974)
- Postcards from China (1975)
- Apat ang Naging Mister Ko (1976)
- Tutol ang Lupa sa Patak ng Ulan (1977)
- Blood Run (1978)
- Kape't Gatas (1980)
- Rosa ng Candaba (1981)
- Puppy Love (1982)
- Sinasamba Kita (1982)
- Summer Holiday (1983)
- Kaya Kong Abutin ang Langit (1984)
- Inday Bote (1985)
- Inday Inday sa Balitaw (1986)
- Alabok sa Ulap (1987)
- Nakausap Ko ang Birhen (1988)
- Boy Negro (1988)
- Tamis ng Unang Halik (1989)
- Kung Sino Pa ang Minahal (1991)
- First Time... Like a Virgin! (1992)
- Aguinaldo (1993)
- May Minamahal (1993)
- Muntik Na Kitang Minahal (1994)
- Pare Ko (1995)
- Ikaw Naman ang Iiyak (1996)
- DoReMi (1996)
- Wala Nang Iibigin Pang Iba (1997)
- Hamog sa Magdamag (1998)
- Mula sa Puso: The Movie (1999)
- Higit Pa sa Buhay Ko (1999)
- Mahal Kita, Walang Iwanan (2000)
- Ooops, Teka Lang... Diskarte Ko 'To! (2001)
- You and Me Against the World (2003)

Television

- Florinda (1977)
- Mansyon (1986)
- Mula sa Puso (1997)
- Love to Love - "Sweet Exchange" (2004)
- Magpakailanman - "The Jose & Perlita Claro Story" (2005)
- Duyan (2006)
- Bakekang (2006)
- I'll Take Care of You (2008)
- May Bukas Pa (2009–2010)
- Love Me Again (2010)
