= Marrion Gopez =

Filipino musician

Yong Gopez
- Born: Marrion Pineda Gopez; October 24, 1992 (age 33); Porac, Pampanga Province (Luzon, Philippines)
- Other name: Yong Gopez
- Occupations: Actor; model; singer
- Years active: 2010–2015, 2026–present
- Agent: Star Magic (2010–2012)
- Known for: Pinoy Big Brother: Teen Clash of 2010 Mara Clara and MMK Signs of Love Story Owner

Marrion "Yong" Gopez (born October 24, 1992) is a former Filipino television personality, dancer, singer, model and a reality show contestant in the Philippines when he joined Pinoy Big Brother: Teen Clash of 2010.

== Television ==
Date	Title	Role	Notes
2015	Maalaala Mo Kaya	Story Owner	Episode Title: Stuffed Toy (February 14, 2015 Re-air: November 7, 2015)
2011	Maynila	Pete	
2011	Reel Love Presents: Tween Hearts	Roy	
2011	Pinoy Samurai	Himself	
2010–2011	Mara Clara	Jimbo Torres	
2010	ASAP	Guest	
2010	Pinoy Big Brother: Teen Clash of 2010	Himself	19th place

== Career ==
=== PBB career ===
Yong's career started on April 10, 2010, when he got included in the Pinoy Big Brother: Teen Clash of 2010 housemates. He was given the title "Boy Bread Winner of Pampanga." He is the youngest of three siblings. He is a son of an unemployed man and a housewife, and enjoys living a simple life. Yong was evicted (19th place) on Day 36.
