= Kyle Alandy Amor =

American visual artist, commercial model, singer, and actor of Filipino descent

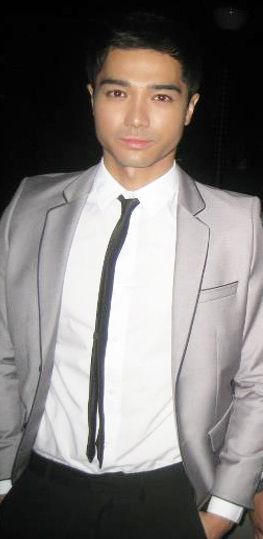
- Kyle Amor at the 2011 5th Annual Star Magic Ball at The Peninsula, Makati.
- Born: Los Angeles, California
- Other name: Kyle Amor
- Occupations: Visual artist, commercial model, singer, actor
- Years active: 2009–2011
- Agents: Star Magic (2009–2011); Cornerstone Talents (2011–2012)
- Height: 5'11

Kyle Alandy Amor (also known as Kyle Amor), is an American visual artist, commercial model, singer, and actor of Filipino descent. He first appeared on 1DOL, a musical teleserye on ABS-CBN as one of the band members of Da Vince Code alongside Sam Milby. He was also cast as one of the talents on the teen musical variety show, Shoutout! on ABS-CBN.

Kyle is co-managed by Cornerstone Talents and Star Magic.

== Music ==
On Music Uplate Live in 2010 with hosts Yeng Constantino & Tutti Caringal.

Kyle has a self-titled album out in the Philippines with the band 3AM under Star Records and has performed and appeared several times on ABS-CBN's late night music show, Music Uplate Live (MUL Live) hosted by Yeng Constantino. 3AM has also been nominated twice for their self-titled debut album at the 3rd PMPC Star Awards for Music for Best Duo/Group Artist and Alternative Album of the Year.

== Modeling ==
Kyle, apart from 3:00 am, is a sought-after print and TV commercial model having appeared in several billboards, commercials, and print magazines in the Philippines. He has modelled for Loalde clothing, endorsed Nescafe's 3in1, and has had several printads and a television commercial for Century Tuna.

In 2011, Kyle was named one of Chalk Magazine's 50 Hottest and was also listed in Meg magazine as one of their Hotties of Summer.

== Visual Arts Background ==
Aside from modeling, music and television, Kyle is also a visual/graphics artist who is fond of drawing and painting. He has designed for clients in both America and the Philippines.

== Filmography ==
=== TV shows ===
Shows
Year	Title	Role	Network
2010	1DOL	Bandmate of Da Vince Code	ABS-CBN
2010–2011	Shoutout! / Shoutout! – Level Up	Himself / Tuesdelicious-FTW group	ABS-CBN

=== Movies ===
Movies
Year	Title	Role	Notes
2012	My Cactus Heart	Bandmate of Carlo	Star Cinema
2012	Kimmy Dora and the Temple of Kiyeme	Cameo (waiter)	Star Cinema

=== TV appearances ===
Appearances
Year	Title	Role	Network
2009	Ka-Blog!	Guest (Art-related / Light-writing)	GMA
2009	Kuwentong Talentado	Guest (Art-related / Light-writing)	TV5
2009	POPKORN	Guest (Art-related / Light-writing)	Channel V
2010	Gimik 2010	Appearance on last episode (Jetski scene)	ABS-CBN
2010	Umagang Kay Ganda	Performer (1DOL Promotion)	ABS-CBN
2010	Us Girls	Himself (Chalk's 50 Hottest)	Studio 23
2010–2011	Music Uplate Live	Himself / Performer	ABS-CBN
2010–2011	ASAP	Himself / Performer	ABS-CBN
2011	LUV Crazy	Appearance with 3 am	TV5
2011	Myx Music Awards	Himself / Presenter	MYX
2011	Star MYX – Top 5 Picks	Himself / Featured Artist – 3AM	MYX

=== TV commercials ===
Commercials
Year	Title	Role
2009	Nescafe 3in1	Light-writing artist
2009	ABS-CBN's Unlimitalk (TFC)	Boyfriend overseas
2011	Century Tuna Healthylicious Hotdog	Yuppie having breakfast

=== Music videos ===
Music Videos
Year	Title	Artist	Role
2009	Up Up Down Down	Krissy & Ericka	Boy interest
2010	Back To Love	Quest	Appearance
2011	Hindi Mo Lang Alam	3AM	Himself

== Albums ==
- 3AM (2011, Star Records)
