= Pepito Rodriguez =

Filipino actor (1942–2026)

- Born: Jose Maria Moreno Rodriguez; October 18, 1942
- Died: February 26, 2026 (aged 83)
- Occupation: Actor
- Years active: 1962–2002
- Relatives: Ramil (brother)

Jose Maria "Pepito" Moreno Rodriguez (October 18, 1942 – February 26, 2026) was a Filipino actor.

== Background ==
Rodriguez was the second of six children. His older brother Ramil Rodriguez was also an actor. Rodriguez never married. He however allowed Tony Jamandre, his wife and their three children to live under his household. Jamandre was Rodriguez's driver from 1982. Rodriguez had a girlfriend at 60 years old but broke up with her after not agreeing to her request to expel the Jamandres.

== Career ==
Rodriguez started his acting career in 1962 and was contracted under Sampaguita Pictures. He along with his brother Ramil got into Sampaguita through their connection with Pepito Vera Perez kaya, the son of studio head Jose Perez. The brothers were given screen tests.

His first film was Siyam na Langit which premiered in 1962. Rodriguez was introduced as a full-fledged actor in the 1963 film Abarinding and appeared in the 1964 film Mga Batang Iskuwater. He was part of the "Stars of '66" launched in 1965. He was part of a love team with fellow Stars of '66 member Rosemarie Sonora. Among the works he featured in with Sonara are Juanita Banana and Life Everlasting.

His first lead role was in Ang Danny Boy of 1969 where he portrayed the titular character. He was named as best supporting actor at the 4th Manila Film Festival in 1969 for his role in Stop Look Listen.

Rodriguez appeared in the Bata film series which includes Mga Batang Bakasyonista which had German Moreno, Gina Pareño, and Sonora as part of its cast. He also acted with Susan Roces in Sa Bilis, Walang Kaparis. His last film was Mga Batang Lansangan Ngayon which premiered in 2002.

== Later life and death ==
After retirement, Rodriguez focused on his medical equipment business. By 2019, he was living in Antipolo, Rizal along with his driver and househelps who he considers part of his family.

Rodriguez died on February 26, 2026, at the age of 83, whilst hospitalised for pneumonia.

== Honors and recognition ==
At the 2024 FAMAS Awards, Rodriguez was named the Iconic Movie Actor of the Philippine Cinema.
