= Ritche Lago Bautista =

Filipino actor

Ritchie Lago Bautista
- Born: June 14, 1977 (age 48); Metro Manila, Philippines
- Occupations: Actor, Presenter

Ritche Lago Bautista (born June 14, 1977 in Manila, Philippines) is a Filipino American actor, best known as a principal actor in The Learning Channel television show Untold Stories of the E.R. in a 2005 episode called "Prepare for the Worst" in which he plays a muscular gangster banging on a hospital window.

== Filmography ==
- Epic Movie (2007)
- Daft Punk's Electroma (2006)
- Jimmy Kimmel Live! (2006) (TV)
- Entourage (2005) TV Series
- Herbie: Fully Loaded (2005)
- Jarhead (2005)
- Las Vegas (2005) TV Series
- Medium (2005) TV Series
- Untold Stories of the E.R. (2005) TV Series
- R-Generation (2004)

== Other works ==
- Commercial for Mitsubishi
- Music Video for Avenged Sevenfold
- Music Video for Seether
