= Pinoy Big Brother: Teen Clash 2010 =

Season of television series

- Season 3
- Presented by: Toni Gonzaga; Bianca Gonzalez; Mariel Rodriguez
- No. of days: 78
- No. of housemates: 27
- Winner: James Reid
- Runner-up: Ryan Bang

Release
- Original network: ABS-CBN
- Original release: April 10 – June 26, 2010

Season chronology
- ← Previous; Teen Edition Plus Next → Teen Edition 4

The third season of the reality game show Pinoy Big Brother: Teen Edition, subtitled Teen Clash 2010 (pronounced as Teen Clash of 2010) aired on ABS-CBN for 78 days from April 10 to June 26, 2010.

This is the first Teen Edition to be held after a regular season instead of a celebrity. This pattern would also be followed by Unlimited and Teen Edition 4. This edition surpassed the previous edition's record for the longest edition by only one day but would later be broken by the next edition by 13 days.

This is the first edition to feature mass evictions; meaning that four or more housemates were evicted on the same night. It is also the second consecutive season to feature more than four finalists. This is also the teen season with the most number of forced evictions, with five.

James Reid of Australia emerged as the winner of the season. Ryan Bang was the runner-up, while Fretzie Bercede, Devon Seron, Ivan Dorschner, and Bret Jackson II were the finalists.

== Development ==
=== Auditions ===
There were two sets of auditions for this edition. The first was held simultaneously with those of the third regular season from March to May 2009. As these auditions were held a year in advance, the age limit was lowered to 14–17. A second set of auditions was held in March 2010, this time with an advanced registration through SMS, the age limit for auditioning was 15–18. A total of around 50,000 auditioned, from which 16 were chosen to enter the house on Day 1. A total of 27 housemates have entered the House, including the replacement housemate that entered on Day 20 and 10 foreign teens that entered on Day 22.

== Overview ==
=== House theme ===
Like the previous edition, Double Up, Teen Clash 2010 uses two houses, both summer vacation-themed with beach murals, hammocks, and other amenities. House A is called the Villa, to be inhabited by housemates who have simple backgrounds. In contrast, those who are well-to-do would live in House B, dubbed the Apartment. The Villa and the Apartment have similar amenities. The difference is that the Villa has the swimming and separate bedrooms, complete with furnished beds. The Apartment only has a Jacuzzi and terrace and includes a large communal sleeping area without any beds, hence the use of the banig (see Chronology section).

=== Hosts ===
Toni Gonzaga, Bianca Gonzalez and Mariel Rodriguez reprised their roles as hosts of the show.

== Format ==
Every week, two sets of teen housemates, the Filipino and Teenternational housemates, will compete for prizes and a spot in the finale while living in separate houses.

=== Twists ===
- Teen Clash: A variant of the "Double Up" twist featured on the season of the same name, as the two houses merged into one, a few days later, foreign teen housemates residing in the Philippines entered the Apartment and were then called the Teenternational Housemates. For three weeks, these housemates participated in tasks against the Pinoy housemates with slots for the Big Night up for grabs in each week. This resulted to the Pinoy Housemates getting one slot and the Teenternational housemates getting three slots to the Big Night.
  - Big 4 to Big 6: Big Brother once again opened up the Big 5 Twist after being used during the previous civilian season. Series of tasks were done by the two houses which then the Teenternational got most of the slots, gaining three of the original four slots. A task for additional slots via the Big Jump to the Big Night was held as a competition between the Philippine housemates and the Teenternational housemates, which the Philippine housemates won, giving them a second spot for the final. A sixth spot for the Philippine housemates was later opened through a task which all housemates accomplished, thus giving bothTeenternationals and three Filipino housemates three spots in the final.
- Mass Evictions: Every week, a triple or mass eviction would take place, while a quadruple eviction would involve the eviction of two housemates from each of the two groups in the same week. Technically, each week may include a mass eviction, which means that four or more housemates were evicted simultaneously.
- House Swaps: Housemates were made to swap houses and group members as instructed by Big Brother.
- Save-Evict Voting System: The public votes to save a housemate, and at the same time, evict a housemate. The housemate with the lowest net votes of both save and evict votes will be evicted.
- Madame X's Abduction: After Fretzie Bercede answered and followed Madame X to the Apartment, as per Big Brother's notice, to give her the two boxes of cash Big Brother entrusted to some housemates the day before, an unknown lady named Madame X kidnapped her and Jenny Kim. However, it was an adbuction plot, and the rest of the house was forced to obey Madame X's orders (which were actually violations of the Big Brother Rule Book) in order to be released. Because of the constant violations, Big Brother issued a forced eviction warning to any of the housemates. This twist tested the housemates' trust in strangers.

== Housemates ==
Name	Age on entry	Hometown	Entered	Exited	Result
James Reid	17	Australia	Day 22	Day 78	Winner
Ryan Bang	18	South Korea	Day 22	Day 78	Runner-up
Fretzie Bercede	16	Cebu City	Day 1	Day 78	3rd Place
Devon Seron	16	Cebu City	Day 1	Day 78	4th Place
Ivan Dorschner	19	Rizal	Day 1	Day 78	5th Place
Bret Jackson II	19	United States	Day 22	Day 78	6th Place
Ann Li	15	Taiwan	Day 22	Day 75	Evicted
Jenny Kim	16	South Korea	Day 22	Day 71	Forced eviction
Tricia Santos	14	Davao City	Day 1	Day 63	Evicted
Angelo Pasco	18	Antique	Day 1	Day 54	Forced eviction
Patrick Sugui	17	Mandaluyong	Day 1	Day 50	Evicted
Joe Vargas	17	Quezon City	Day 1	Day 50	Evicted
Sophia Ko	14	South Korea	Day 22	Day 50	Evicted
Jack Yoon	19	Cebu City	Day 22	Day 50	Evicted
Yen Santos	17	Nueva Ecija	Day 1	Day 43	Evicted
Kazel Kinouchi	18	Parañaque	Day 1	Day 43	Evicted
Richard Na	17	South Korea	Day 22	Day 43	Evicted
Carson Vince	16	Canada	Day 22	Day 43	Evicted
Marrion "Yong" Gopez	16	Porac	Day 1	Day 36	Evicted
Jovic Susim	17	Albay	Day 20	Day 36	Evicted
April Sun	18	Hong Kong	Day 22	Day 36	Evicted
Kyra Custodio	15	Batangas City	Day 1	Day 29	Evicted
Shey Bustamante	17	Mindoro	Day 1	Day 24	Forced eviction
Rebecca Chiongbian	14	Cebu	Day 1	Day 22	Evicted
Eslove Briones	17	Tawi-Tawi	Day 1	Day 19	Forced eviction
Romeo "Potz" Jalosjos	19	Dipolog	Day 1	Day 15	Evicted
Maichel Fideles	19	Samar	Day 2	Day 15	Forced eviction

=== Stay history ===
First Batch

Teen Housemates
Name	Initial House	Week 2	Week 4		Week 11		
Fretzie	Apartment		Villa	Apartment	Villa		
Devon	Villa						
Ivan	Apartment		Villa				
Tricia	Apartment	Villa			Out		
Angelo	Villa				Out		
Patrick	Apartment		Villa		Out		
Joe	Villa	Apartment	Villa		Out	Apartment (Re-entered)	Out
Yen	Apartment		Villa		Out		
Kazel	Apartment		Villa		Out		
Yong	Villa				Out		
Jovic	Not in House		Villa		Out	Apartment (Re-entered)	Out
Kyra	Villa			Out		Apartment (Re-entered)	Out
Shey	Villa			Out		Apartment (Re-entered)	Out
Rebecca	Apartment		Villa	Out			
Eslove	Villa			Out		Apartment (Re-entered)	Out
Potz	Apartment		Out		Apartment (Re-entered)		Out
Maichel	Villa		Out				

Teenternational Housemates

Teenternational Housemates
Name	Initial House	Week 4		Week 6	Week 11		
James	Apartment			Villa			
Ryan	Apartment	Villa	Apartment	Villa			
Bret	Apartment			Villa			
Ann	Apartment			Villa	Out	Apartment (Re-entered)	Out
Jenny	Apartment			Villa	Out		
Sophia	Apartment			Villa	Out		
Jack	Apartment			Villa	Out		
Richard	Apartment			Villa	Out		
Carson	Apartment			Villa	Out	Apartment (Re-entered)	Out

== Chronology of notable events ==
Below is a chronology of events, not including nomination and eviction nights. This section also lists voluntary and temporary exits, entrances of houseguests, visitors, new housemates, and other events that affected the housemates' lives inside the House. This case, April 10, 2010, is considered Day 1.

=== Week 1 ===
- Day 1: Fifteen teen housemates entered either Houses A or B similar to the Double Up season. Joe, Devon, Eslove, Shey, Angelo, Kyra, and Yong entered the Villa (House A). Potz, Rebecca, Yen, Patrick, Tricia, Kazel, Ivan, and Fretzie entered the Apartment (House B). They were informed of a special task of getting to know the housemates of the opposing House. Any incorrect answer in the test at the end of the week would mean eviction for one housemate. This would apply to both Houses.
- Day 2: Each housemates of each house were introduced to their goats, which would be involved in their weekly tasks. Later at night, Maichel finally entered the Villa with a task to be totally mute and convince his fellow housemates to correctly guess and spell his name. Maichel immediately failed his task when he greeted his fellow housemates and introduced himself.
- Day 4: To help learn Filipino further, Ivan was instructed to talk the Apartment's pet goat in Filipino. He was further helped by Potz, who acted as the goat's "voice." Ivan, together with Kazel and Potz, also successfully learned a full Filipino song, thus giving the Apartment's housemates access to the pool in the Villa. Their use of the pool also gave the housemates of both houses a glimpse of each other.
- Day 5: As a last task of getting to know the opposing house, the housemates of both houses found out who correctly matched each housemate to their baby pictures. After some interviews and tweaking, the Apartment housemates managed to ace their task by identifying all eight of the Villa housemates. The Villa housemates on the other hand only matched three, thus an elimination was already looming for one of them, to be decided by the Apartment housemates. To help them in their decision, the Apartment housemates, with Big Brother consent, deliberately made their abode a mess. The Villa housemates were then tasked to clean the Apartment up while they were being observed their Apartment counterparts in the confession room.
- Day 6: Based on their observations from the cleanup task the day before, the Apartment housemates decided to eliminate Shey. Shey's fellow Villa housemates appealed not to boot her out. So after an exchange of ideas to settle the issue, a water volleyball match was held wherein at stake were Shey's continued stay in the Villa and some beds for the Apartment housemates. The Villa won over the Apartment and thus, Shey was saved.

=== Week 2 ===
- Day 8: Maichel was automatically put up for eviction due to violations he committed such as introducing himself when he was supposed to do a task as well as improper use of the lapel microphone and shower times. Later after the nominations, Joe left a pillow in the confession room to be given to Tricia, to whom he has a crush on, and was sent to the common storage room. Tricia was then called and was told that she would stay in the Villa from that moment while Joe would be living in the Apartment.
- Day 9: The housemates on both houses saw a P10,000 check. As instructed by Big Brother, the housemates discussed on who would receive the check. The Villa housemates decided to give the check to Angelo while those in the Apartment had Fretzie's neighbor as the recipient of the check. The Teentramurals were also announced wherein the House that won at least three out of the five games would also win the P10,000 check. In the first Teentramurals event, which involves standing inside large water balls, the Villa housemates won and scored ten points.
- Day 10: The second weekly task was announced. Potz had an idea of making a voluntary exit, thinking his jester role was taken over by Joe and he had been ignored since then. On the other hand, Joe himself divulged that he had a hard time adjusting to Apartment life. At the Villa, Yong was tasked to be Tricia's personal guardian angel to help her fit in with everyone else. The assignment would help expose the other girls' feelings against Tricia, resulting in the girls straightening out their differences. The Housemates faced off in the second Teentramurals game, played with a small ping-pong table and equally small rackets. The Villa housemates won, 66–57.
- Day 11: The third Teentramurals games involved a literal spelling bee, with the housemates dressed with bee wings and antennae and buzzers resembling flowers. The Villa won their third straight game, 14–10, winning P10,000 for Angelo's family.
- Day 12: The fourth Teentramurals game had the housemates play sepak takraw which used balloons as balls. The Apartment housemates lost again and were later tasked to become the Villa's "service crew" (i.e. cooks, maids, and helpers) due to a number of minor violations. They were also told not to speak with any Villa housemate. Maichel was marked for forced eviction after being caught sleeping at the wrong time and talking without his lapel mike on.
- Day 13: Maichel was finally informed of his forced eviction, but was allowed to stay further and was told he would exit together with whoever obtained the lowest number of votes in the public voting.
- Day 14: Performance day for the weekly task was held with Jeffrey Quizon, Gladys Reyes, and Vice Ganda as judges. After the performances, Vice Ganda visited the Apartment housemates. Later, the housemates discussed their relation to controversial news stories concerning the Filipino youth.

=== Week 3 ===
- Day 15: The results of the weekly task were announced. The judges favored the Villa 28-24 while the public poll results also showed preference to the Villa performance giving the Villa housemates their second straight weekly task win. Afterwards, Maichel bade goodbye to his companions.
- Day 16: Ivan took tests in Filipino speaking, comprehension, and vocabulary to prove that his fellow Apartment housemates taught him the language well in 48 hours. Ivan passed the tests and the Apartment housements were told that the beds they won were in the Villa, therefore signalling the merge of the two houses and all housemates would live in the Villa.
- Day 17: The third weekly task was announced. For this, the housemates decided to design and produce T-shirts to be sold to people outside the House.
- Day 18: Joe was shown a video of Eslove handling a knife and unintentionally pantomimed a stabbing action at several female housemates (Actually, Tricia was the victim in the said video). Joe then found out from Big Brother that Eslove would be given a forced eviction at a later time because of this threat of violence (NOTE: Big Brother told Joe that only the latter should know and not to tell the other housemates about the conversation as well as the forced eviction). Yong, Devon, Kyra, Angelo and Shey also found out about Eslove's forced eviction. It was through the video that Joe found out that Eslove's "joke" was half-meant and the latter was frustrated since the use of a knife is a very serious matter.
- Day 19: The housemates celebrated a double birthday party for Rebecca and Eslove. Afterwards, Eslove was told of his forced eviction. He made his exit soon afterwards. The former Apartment housemates also tasked to become the Villa housemates' personal caretakers.
- Day 20: New housemate Jovic entered the house with a new task: slip into the boys' bedroom and lie in bed unnoticed. Big Brother left a note to the housemates that he would be gone for several days for an important errand, leaving Jovic a so-told (actually not real) power to nominate three housemates. Later, Big Utol, Big Brother's younger brother, finally introduced himself to the housemates and telling them he would take over his older brother's duties. Unknown to the housemates, Big Brother's errand was for new bedspacers for the Apartment (see Teenternational Housemates above).
- Day 21: Jovic was instructed by Big Brother that he had to choose the nominees for the upcoming nomination night, which was revealed to be fake and was only done to test the housemates' reaction, whether they would try to suck up or stay the same.

=== Week 4 ===
- Day 22: The housemates in the Villa found out that their T-shirts earned them P25,900, resulting in their first weekly task win as a merged group. Meanwhile, the Teenternational Housemates began to populate the Apartment. The Philippine housemates in the Villa were then informed that the Apartment was once again inhabited, knowing nothing about their neighbors' foreign origins.
- Day 23: Big Utol gave the Caucasian housemates (Bret, Carson, and James) their first task: enter the Villa dressed as backpackers coming from a long arduous trip and interact with the female Philippine housemates there in English without even hinting that they could at least understand the Filipino language. Later, after Jovic did his "nomination duty" of naming three housemates, Big Brother decided to return and nullify Jovic's decision after he got wind of violations several housemates committed. He gave Shey a forced eviction and Joe, Patrick, Devon, and Kyra automatic nominations all for conversing about the nomination process in three separate instances (in which Shey participated in all of them). Big Brother further reminded that the punishments he meted would serve as a final warning to everyone for their blatant rule violations (Big Brother in fact, warned the housemates even the day Maichel was forcibly evicted due to violations. He also suggested that they should frequently read the Rulebook especially for violations. He warned the housemates that if one housemate violated, everyone is liable and shall be punished (Ang pagkakamali ng isa, ay pagkakamali ng lahat). It was also through the videos that Tricia found out that she was still being targeted by the others despite her peace offerings. Meanwhile, in the Apartment, Ryan was tasked to teach Pinoy Ako to his fellow Teenternational housemates after being heard singing the said song.
- Day 24: In the Apartment, James, Carson, and Bret were told to choose a fellow housemate to act as human souvenir after the three did not completely accomplish their task. The three chose Jack, who was then dressed as a kangaroo and told to hop like one and have either one of three inside the costume's pouch (simulating a joey). In the Villa, Shey performed several dances in front of the other housemates as her final task before making her obligatory exit. Later, the Villa housemates regained their possessions confiscated from them by Big Utol after rearranging a simulated mess in their bedrooms. In the Apartment, Jack was relieved of his punishment after Ryan gave a satisfactory albeit misheard and off-key version of Pinoy Ako. The male Philippine housemates then learned phrases either in Mandarin Chinese or Korean from the female foreign housemates. In the test that followed, only Patrick passed, leading him to receive a letter from his girlfriend.
- Day 25: Meanwhile, the Korean male housemates posed themselves as a K-Pop group called R2J. A video of them lip-synching to One Way's "Magic" was shown to both houses. R2J then visited the Villa and mingled with the housemates there for several minutes before leaving. Afterwards, Big Brother formally met the housemates in the two houses and then announced the Philippines vs. World Clash wherein in the next three tasks, the winning house would gain one of three spots in the Big Four. Patrick and James were assigned as team captains.
- Day 26: The two houses battled in their first Clash game, which involved jogging on top of a non-Newtonian liquid and sinking would give the other house a point. The Pinoy housemates prevailed in the said game. As a consequence, a Teenternational housemate would be imprisoned in a jail in the Villa, which was later to be revealed as Ryan. The prisoners must stay and eat in a cage with a ball and chain attached in their feet, in exception of confession room conversations and bathroom breaks.
- Day 27: The housemates battled once again for the second Clash game. The task involved a jumping ring in which the housemates have to pass through without making any contact. The Teenternational housemates won the game, which means a Pinoy housemate will be imprisoned at the Apartment, which was later to be revealed as Fretzie. Later that night, Big Brother gave the prisoners a chance to escape free from the cages, by allowing them to guess the combination for the locks by getting clues from the opposite housemates' biographies.
- Day 28: Ryan participated in a task to free him by having his fellow Teen-ternational housemates answer questions relating to the Philippines; Ryan was given a shock for every wrong answer his fellow housemates gave. He was subsequently freed after six correct answers were given by the Teen-ternational housemates. Fretzie was presumably given this same task the next day.

=== Week 5 ===
- Day 29: The results of the weekly task were announced in which the Teenternationals won in the public vote 75.9%-24.1%. This also indicated the first ever loss for the Philippine housemates who lived in the Villa since the start of the edition.
- Day 31: Devon and Angelo's mothers entered the Villa as house helpers for both houses with the condition that they would not reveal themselves to their children nor to the other Villa housemates. This was done in exchange for full scholarships for Devon and Angelo.
- Day 32: The Teenternational housemates prepared a surprise birthday party for James at the Villa. They also decided to "invite" Patrick, Tricia, Fretzie for the party with Ryan and Jenny acting as a singing telegram to send the message. Later in the evening after the party, Devon and Angelo were tasked to leave whatever laundry they wanted washed at the glass door at the Apartment without talking to anyone. It was then that the two emotionally discovered that their mothers were the ones doing the laundry. Angelo and Devon were then told not tell their discovery to their fellow housemates.
- Day 33: Due to hypertension, Devon's mother was sent to the hospital, induced after seeing her daughter and falling off while hanging the laundry. Devon was finally informed of what happened.
- Day 34: At the request of the Philippine housemates, the official hula hoop competition for their weekly task was held a day early. Both houses failed in their initial attempts before the housemates were moved to the activity area. There, the Philippine housemates achieved the objective of passing the hula hoops first, winning the weekly task in the process. Later, the male Villa housemates were guessed correctly that one of the helpers was Angelo's mother, which they knew all along, but voided the mothers' task in the process. To salvage Angelo, Devon, and their mothers' efforts, the boys from both Houses (except Angelo) agreed on a sacrifice by twirling hula hoops for 24 hours. In the evening, Empress Schuck entered the Apartment dressed as the hunchback Rosa from the upcoming show Rosalka to act as a guide to a beauty debate wherein Ryan acted as judge. Meanwhile, Maja Salvador and Double Up winner Melisa Cantiveros entered the Villa disguised as imposter house helps (a reference to another upcoming show Impostor). The two eventually revealed themselves after the Villa housemates found them out.

=== Week 6 ===
- Day 36: In the wee hours, the boys from both Houses completed their sacrifice for Angelo's mother. As a result, she received Angelo's college scholarship aside from the P10,000 wage for being a house help. Big Brother had the Villa's housemates' limbs braced and the Apartment's housemates wear opaque goggles for several violations several housemates in both housemates committed (such as sleeping at the wrong time, mishandling the lapel microphone, and taking a bath outside shower time). The punishments were relieved after the Philippine housemates brought in April, Ann, and Carson's luggage to their bedrooms and the Teenternational housemates brought in pillows from their designated areas. After the eviction proceedings, Angelo and his mother had a 100-second reunion, the first time they saw each other in two years. Afterwards, he was informed of his mother's task and the sacrifice the other boys made to make up for the Villa boys' suspicion of his mother. This resulted in Angelo finally having his scholarship.
- Day 37: The weekly task games started with the first game involving shooting basketballs while running on a treadmill. The Philippine housemates won this game.
- Day 38: The second weekly task game involved making the housemates from the opposing house laugh by spilling liquid from their mouths. The Philippine housemates won this game by keeping more liquid that the Teenternationals, much to Bret's further disappointment.
- Day 39: The housemates competed in the third weekly task game of arm wrestling inside glass cases with rats, frogs, worms, cockroaches, and a combination of them. During the tie-breaker round, Angelo hurt his arm and had to be sent to the hospital for a short while. Because of this, Big Brother ruled the contest a draw. Later, the Teenternationals were told to pack up their things and move to the Villa to live with the Philippine housemates.
- Day 40: Big Brother decided to hold separate birthday parties for Tricia and Devon and the other housemates were made to decide which party they would attend. Bret, Carson, Sophia, Ryan, and the Philippine housemates joined Devon while Tricia was greeted by the other Teenternationals. Meanwhile, Devon's mother returned to the House, received her wage of P10,000 for being a house help and then personally handed the scholarship that she earned to her daughter, again as the product of the boys' hula hoop sacrifice. Tricia was later shown a video of birthday wishes from her parents and her friends from the outside world.
- Day 42: Complaining of chest pains, discoloration, and shortness of breath, James was sent to the hospital for several hours to be checked. Meanwhile, the singing competition part of the weekly task took place wherein the Philippine housemates sang Yeng Constantino's "Parangap Lang" and the Teenternationals did Never Shout Never's "Can't Stand It." The two groups were judged by Marc Abaya and Magic 89.9's DJ Mojo Jojo, who deemed the Teenternationals the better band.

=== Week 7 ===
- Day 43: The final competition of the weekly task, the modelling competition took place wherein first Celebrity Edition housemate Mich Dulce and fashion designer Robbie Carmona were the judges.
- Day 44: Big Brother announced the overall results of the weekly task, showing Robbie and Mich's assessment of the groups. Based on the 30 points up for grabs on the fashion competition, the Teenternational housemates came from behind 57.5-44.5 to win the weekly task and snatch another two slots for the finale.
- Day 45: With the Teenternatinals having three spots in the finale, the Philippine housemates, as approved by Big Brother, issued a challenge for a rematch for one of the three spots the Teenternationals earned. But the challenge, which was in a form of a rap that contained taunts, did not sit well with the Teenternationals, causing tensions between the two groups. While reconciliation did occur with some small talk and peace offerings, minor issues remained as the Teenternationals were left to decide whether or not to accept the Philippine housemates' challenge.
- Day 46: Ivan and Joe discussed with Ann and Jack about the challenge and other details in the confession room. Eventually, the Teenternationals refused the challenge, due largely to the taunts from the night before. In the evening, Big Brother announced the Big Jump to the Big Night wherein the housemates would compete in a series of competitions to automatically determine who would get a fifth spot in the finale. The first competition, which would determine the group that would get the spot, involved sitting on a chair of dominoes for an hour with the proviso that it should be in the same condition as it was in the beginning even when the chair had some unravelling along the way.
- Day 47: The Philippine housemates won the domino chair competition by becoming the first to have all seven members each sit in the chair for an hour. This gave them a second spot in the finale to add the only original Big 4 spot that they won in the previous weekly task.
- Day 48: Sophia was given a surprise party for her birthday. Joe, Patrick, Jack, and James crossdressed themselves and performed "Fire" by 2NE1, while Ivan, together with Jenny and Bret, performed a Korean song for her. A video message from her sisters was also shown to her.
- Day 49: Devon was tasked to guide and prepare her fellow housemates for the weekly task wushu performance. The performance took place in the afternoon under the watchful eyes of several wushu experts. The gong was struck three times, signifying the success of the housemates' first task together.

=== Week 8 ===
- Day 50: Big Brother tasked Ryan to teach the other housemates how to play soccer. Later that day, Big Brother brought guests whom the housemates competed with on soccer. It was later revealed that these guests were actually the Philippine Team for the Homeless World Cup 2010, who has something to do with their concert weekly task.
- Day 51: The "auditions" for the upcoming concert were held for the housemates. The housemates were divided depending on their skills such as dancing and singing, as decided by the jurors/instructors. The jurors included Jhong Hilario of the dance group Streetboys for dancing and Sweet Plantado of the singing group The company for singing.
- Day 52: The Singing Bee musical director Mel Villena further mentored the housemates for music for their concert. In the process, Bret managed to compose an original song with Fretzie in just one afternoon.
- Day 53: Angelo and James were brought to and were confined at the hospital due to concerns about their health through their x-rays. With the possibility of either or both of them not coming back into the House before the lapsing of the 24-hour deadline, voting had to be temporarily suspended. For the meantime, the other housemates were moved to the Apartment while the Villa was being cleaned and disinfected.
- Day 54: Angelo was denied clearance by the doctors to come back to the House, thus receiving a forced eviction. To signify this, the other housemates helplessly watched as one of two red balloons was being popped. The other balloon, which symbolized James, was eventually also popped a few hours later to show that he had returned. Meanwhile, Tricia told Big Brother about the idea of a voluntary exit; he recommended her to go to sleep first due to activities ahead.
- Day 55: Big Brother announced to the housemates that their concert would be postponed to the next week due to unexpected circumstances like Angelo's exit and James' illness and to give more time for them to practice.
- Day 56: For winning a game the previous day, the Teenternationals had the opportunity to watch some ABS-CBN shows in the Apartment. Big Brother signalled the end of a task of not interacting with Tricia for several days to let her discover herself more. The other housemates promptly apologized to her for not talking to her, causing her to have dramatic situations to herself.

=== Week 9 ===
- Day 57: Big Brother extended his message of the postponement of the concert by telling the housemates that there would not be an eviction night on that day, a fact already known to viewers upon the announcement of Angelo's forced eviction.
- Day 58: After a discussion amongst the housemates about their grandparents, especially those suffering from Alzheimer's disease, they were tasked to make two old women remember the housemates' names. The women in question were brought in the Hospicio de San Jose and both have regressive memories. An afternoon of exchanging stories, anecdotes, and entertainment ensued. But despite housemates' efforts, they failed their task as neither woman were able to recall any names.
- Day 60: James was finally told to take off the oxygen tube from his nose. He was wearing the tube connected to an oxygen task since his return from the hospital six days before.
- Day 62: The housemates' concert, dubbed "The Big Goal Concert," was held in the Apartment in front of a live audience, as well as being televised to viewers, which included members of the Homeless World Cup Philippine team. Both Big Brother and housemates themselves regarded the concert a success.

=== Week 10 ===
- Day 64: Jenny and Ivan were each given a brick of P1,000 bills worth P100,000 (both part of the proceeds from the Big Goal Concert) and were tasked to handle the bricks for safekeeping. Unknown to them, this would be the beginning of a series of scenarios that would test the housemates.
- Day 65: A cellphone was left among the comforters and the housemates were hesitant to answering it (in fear of rule violations). When they were told to answer, Fretzie conversed with a certain Madam X who told her of a task she claimed Big Brother told Fretzie and Jenny were to perform. After taking Ivan's brick without everyone else's knowledge, Fretzie and Jenny presented themselves to Madam X at the Apartment and after being blindfolded, were unknowingly abducted as part of Madam X's plot to keep the P200,000 to herself and hold the duo at ransom. Conversations between Madam X and the other housemates ensued, but still caused more tension with the housemates who were left behind as Fretzie and Jenny's time under Madam X's custody wore on. In the process, the housemates gave up their possessions and the furniture to secure their release. Eventually, Fretzie was released after the negotiations.
- Day 66: The housemates were informed that Fretzie and Jenny's abduction by Madam X and how the others handled the negotiations was indeed a test of trust by Big Brother which they failed especially that violations were committed, including communicating to someone from the outside, moving the furniture, and not following his directions. Big Brother imposed a forced eviction to any one of them because of this. To determine which, the housemates were split into groups and were made to decide unanimously by pressing buzzers in front of them. A buzz from the Filipinos would mean a departure for one of the four Teenternationals still in the House while a Teenternational buzz would signify a Filipino place in the final six forfeited. If neither buzzer was touched within 30 minutes, Jenny, who was not released by Madam X by the end of the task, would be the one evicted. The third condition was the one that occurred. Jenny was returned to other housemates without being told of her fate.
- Day 67: Seeing that Fretzie and Bret were hanging out with each other often, they were strapped together with Ann between them. In preparation for the weekly task, the housemates saw the confession room festooned with clocks showing different times. In a first of several tasks to eliminate the clocks with incorrect times, the housemates did a live spot-the-differences game which involved people who were each related to the housemates in some way. They were able to spot four differences, resulting in 20 clocks being removed as well as Devon having dinner with her sister and Fretzie with her mother. Jenny was informed of her forced eviction due to her fellow housemates' indecisiveness and she would exit in a later time. She was further told not to divulge to the others about it.
- Day 68: Ryan's birthday was celebrated in the House. Before the parties, the housemates played large scale mate-in-three chess problems wherein Ryan was the Black King, the other housemates were dressed as the other black pieces, and Big Brother played as White. The housemates solved three problems and 15 clocks were removed as a result. The first part of the party was held with Ryan visibly left out as a surprise. Because the housemates were preoccupied with attending to a few celebrity visitors (including Enchong Dee), the time Ryan actually spent in the party was abruptly cut short by Big Brother. He only let the party continue for a short while after James, Bret, Devon, and Fretzie lifted Ryan by party levitation. Ryan later had dinner with Tippy, an acquaintance on whom he had a crush.
- Day 69: When it was known to Big Brother that Ivan was a scout leader, Ivan was told to don his American Boy Scout uniform and teach his fellow housemates many skills taught and required in scouting. Later, host Mariel Rodriguez (as tasked by Big Brother) pretended to drown at the pool and was eventually saved by Ivan. The former then became a guinea pig for Ivan's first aid lessons. The housemates battled against local Boy and Girl Scouts in performing scouting skills. The housemates garnered two points and eliminated ten clocks for the weekly task. In the evening, Ivan was challenged to light a fire using bamboo so he could see in entirety a video message from his mother.
- Day 70: Big Brother gave Ivan the chance to continue his attempts to light a fire using bamboo, to which he ended up failing to do so. For his efforts, Ivan was allowed to watch the video, but with the audio off. Myx VJs Bianca Roque and Chino Liu-Po oversaw a task wherein the housemates tried themselves out as VJs. Bret, Fretzie, Ivan, and Ryan proceeded to the second round wherein they each interviewed one of four finalists in MYX's VJ Search. In the evening, Big Brother finally announced Jenny's eventual forced eviction to the other housemates. In the confession room, Jenny was able to communicate with her father through telephone.

=== Week 11 ===
- Day 71: Gabby Concepcion and daughter KC visited the House to talk with the housemates about fathers. The housemates then competed in the clock removal game by matching the time on their chosen wristwatch with any of the marked clocks in the confession room wall. This game brought the overall number of eliminated clocks to 75. In the evening, the results of the Myx VJ task were announced wherein Chino and Bianca adjudged Bret as the winner and would be part of the channel's VJ roster for three months upon his exit. Jenny made her exit afterwards. The housemates then tried to finally deduce the clock with the correct time. The entire weekly task was then deemed a failure when they chose the clock held by Fretzie when in fact the clock Ryan held was the one with the correct time.
- Day 72: All activities that happened on this day were related to Father's Day. In the wee hours, Ryan single-handedly washed all 10 taxi cabs so he could send a pair of shoes to his father. In the morning, the male housemates took care of baby dolls to experience fatherhood. This eventually progressed to babysitting four male toddlers and later four very young boys, three five-year-olds and an eight-year-old. In the evening, James was able to speak to his father through telephone.
- Day 74: The housemates gave each other gold, silver, and bronze medals to show which they think most deserved to win the season. In this process, Fretzie and Devon regarded themselves as potential Big Winners
- Day 75: After Ann was evicted, she reentered the Apartment, where she was joined by April, Carson, Joe, Jovic, Kyra, Potz and Shey, all of whom would perform special tasks with her. Fretzie and Devon were tasked to pack things good for a few days' adventure, for their special task.
- Day 76: Fretzie and Devon were placed in the Villa's garden/pool area, which was littered with trash. They were locked out of the house and were therefore exposed to the elements. Meanwhile, the boys were given a dilemma of their own when food and drinks were left for them. After appealing to Big Brother on what he just saw and wanting to prove himself as well, Ivan joined the girls in the garden. James did the same thing and in the evening, he too joined the Philippine housemates in their survival test, later to be joined by Ryan. Eventually Bret, the last one inside the Villa's interior, was tasked and became successful in opening the lock to the Villa doors and rescuing his fellow housemates outside.

== Weekly tasks ==
For winning a weekly task, the winning house gets a weekly budget for the following week, with the losing house getting only their daily supplies. For the fourth, fifth and sixth weekly tasks, the Pinoy Teen housemates would face off with the Teenternational housemates. Aside from the weekly budget, the winner will get a sure slot in the Big Four.

Task No.	Date given	Description	Villa Result	Apartment Result
1	April 11, 2010 (Day 02)	Oh My Goat; Each house would be given a goat from which they would extract milk. The team with the most milk collected wins.	Passed	Failed
2	April 19, 2010 (Day 10)	Teentertainment; Each house would each perform a dance presentation, which would be judged by a panel from the show Showtime and from a public poll.	Passed	Failed
			Housemates' Result	
3	April 26, 2010 (Day 17)	NegosyanTeens; The housemates would run a business of their choice, including the promotion and selling of the items. They must earn at least P15,000 to win the task.	Passed	
			Pinoy Result	Teenternational Result
4	May 4, 2010 (Day 25)	Interpreteens; The housemates would try to interpret songs that would be assigned to them. The Philippine housemates were assigned the song "Magic" by One Way while the foreigners were given "Butse Kik" by Yoyoy Villame. The winning House would be given an automatic slot for the finale and it would be determined by a viewer poll.	Failed	Passed
5	May 9, 2010 (Day 30)	HuLaban-Hoop; The housemates from both houses would take part in a hula hoop twirling contest, wherein they must twirl the hula hoops for several times and pass them to the other housemates. The performance should last the entire duration of "Kabataang Pinoy." The House should call Big Brother to check on their performance. The first House to flawlessly finish their performance wins. Since there is one extra Philippine housemate, that housemate had to pass on this task.	Passed	Failed
6	May 17, 2010 (Day 37)	Challenge Me; The housemates will battle in a series of competitions based on their area of expertise which involves basketball, stand-up comedy, modelling, arm wrestling and singing. The winning team in each competition will get certain points, which will then be added up to determine the winning house. This task will give 2 automatic slots for the Big Night.	Failed	Passed
			Housemates' Result	
7	May 23, 2010 (Day 44)	Wushu; Perform a wushu exhibition using fans to the satisfaction of a panel of experts. The number of times a gong is struck determines the success or failure of the task: two times for failure and three times for success. They had six hours everyday to practice for the performance.	Passed	
8	May 29, 2010 (Day 50)	The Big Goal Concert; Hold a concert in which the earned money will be given to the soccer/football team of the Philippines in order to enter for the Homeless World Cup being held in Brazil. Other than the concert, the housemates will also sell valuable items such as T-shirts, DVD of the concert and autographed pictures of themselves.	Passed	
9	June 16, 2010 (Day 67)	Tick Tock; Guess from around 100 clocks the one which shows the correct time. Several of those showing the wrong times could be eliminated by winning several games.	Failed	

== Nomination history ==
The housemate first mentioned in each nomination gets two points, while the second gets one point. The percentage of votes shown is the percentage of votes to save unless otherwise stated. Each house would field at least the highest two point gatherers to the list of nominees. For the first three evictions, the two nominees who gathered the fewest save votes, no matter which house each belongs, are evicted from the houses, hence it a double eviction.

The two-House concept only lasted 15 days. On Day 16, all Housemates were merged into one house, the Villa. However, with the introduction of the Teenternational Housemates, the house was once again divided into two, with the Teenternational Housemates residing in Apartment. Nomination and evictions rules were also changed with a number of Filipino and Teenternational housemates to be evicted at the end of the voting period; evictions and voting for each group are independent of each other. The housemates with the top three nominations scores, including ties, are included in the set of nominees.

On Day 39, the two groups were told to live in one house but they still nominated within each group separately.

On Day 44 nominations, the housemates were told to nominate the housemates from the opposing group. The Pinoy housemates nominated the Teenternational housemates and the Teenternational housemates nominated the Pinoy housemates.

On Day 51, the top ten housemates were given the freedom to nominate any housemate from both groups, but the top two point gatherers from each group were then fielded as the week's nominees. The Vote-to-Save and Vote-to-Evict scheme was also adapted for the week.

Pinoy Big Brother: Teen Clash 2010 nomination history
	#1	#2	#3	#4		#5		#6		#7	#8	#9	#10	BIG NIGHT	Nominations received
Eviction day and date	Day 15 April 24	Day 22 May 1	Day 29 May 8	Day 36 May 15		Day 43 May 22		Day 50 May 29		Day 57 June 4	Day 63 June 11	Day 71 June 19	Day 75 June 23	Day 78 June 26	Nominations received
Nomination day and date	Day 8 April 17	Day 16; April 25	Day 23; May 2	Day 30; May 9		Day 37; May 16		Day 44 & 45; May 23 & 24		Day 51; May 30		Day 63; June 11			Nominations received
James	Not in the House		Exempt	Carson; April		Carson; Sophia		Joe; Fretzie		Tricia; Fretzie		No nominations		Winner	4 + 4 + 2
Ryan	Not in the House		Exempt	Richard; Sophia		Sophia; Richard		Tricia; Angelo		Tricia; Angelo		No nominations		Runner-up	3 + 2 + 1
Fretzie	Tricia; Yen	Yen; Kazel	No nominations	Yen; Tricia		Tricia; Angelo		Ryan; Jack		Jenny; James		Finalist		3rd Place	1 + 1
Devon	Angelo; Maichel	Tricia; Eslove	No nominations	Angelo; Tricia		Tricia; Angelo		Jack; Sophia		Jenny; Ann		Finalist		4th Place	3 + 2 + 2 (+1)
Ivan	Tricia; Yen	Rebecca; Yen	No nominations	Angelo; Yen		Tricia; Yen		Bret; Jack		Tricia; Bret		Finalist		5th Place	2 + 7 + 1
Bret	Not in the House		Exempt	Carson; Sophia		Carson; Sophia		Tricia; Ivan		Tricia; Ann		No nominations		6th Place	2 + 2 + 3
Ann	Not in the House		Exempt	April; Carson		Carson; Ryan		Tricia; Angelo		Tricia; Bret		No nominations		Evicted (Day 75)	6 + 2
Jenny	Not in the House		Exempt	April; Carson		Carson; Sophia		Tricia; Joe		Tricia; Bret		No nominations	Forced Eviction (Day 71)		1 + 3 + 4
Tricia	Patrick; Potz	Eslove; Angelo	No nominations	Angelo; Yong		Angelo; Kazel		Jack; Jenny		Devon; James		Evicted (Day 63)			14 + 10 + 24 + 11 + 14
Angelo	Eslove; Joe	Tricia; Eslove	No nominations	Devon; Tricia		Tricia; Ivan		James; Sophia		Tricia; Ryan	Forced Eviction (Day 54)				8 + 16 + 3 + 1
Patrick	Tricia; Potz	Rebecca; Yen	No nominations	Angelo; Jovic		Tricia; Ivan		Jenny; Sophia		Evicted (Day 50)					4 + 2 (+1)
Joe	Angelo; Yong	Ivan; Rebecca	No nominations	Tricia; Angelo		Angelo; Ivan		James; Jack		Evicted (Day 50)					2 + 2 + 3 (+1)
Sophia	Not in the House		Exempt	Carson; Ann		Carson; Ryan		Tricia; Angelo		Evicted (Day 50)					8 + 3
Jack	Not in the House		Exempt	James; Ryan		Richard; Carson		Patrick; Tricia		Evicted (Day 50)					2 + 7
Yen	Tricia; Rebecca	Joe; Rebecca	No nominations	Tricia; Yong		Ivan; Tricia		Evicted (Day 43)							8 + 4
Kazel	Tricia; Potz	Rebecca; Patrick	No nominations	Tricia; Jovic		Ivan; Angelo		Evicted (Day 43)							3 + 1
Richard	Not in the House		Exempt	Ann; James		Ann; James		Evicted (Day 43)							5
Carson	Not in the House		Exempt	Bret; Jenny		Jack; Sophia		Evicted (Day 43)							21
Yong	Eslove; Shey	Devon; Tricia	No nominations	Tricia; Jovic		Evicted (Day 36)									4 + 3
Jovic	Not in the House		~~Patrick~~; ~~Tricia~~; ~~Yong~~	Tricia; Yong		Evicted (Day 36)									3
April	Not in the House		Exempt	Carson; Ann		Evicted (Day 36)									5
Kyra	Angelo; Joe	Eslove; Tricia	No nominations	Evicted (Day 29)											3 (+1)
Shey	Yong; Eslove	Tricia; Kyra	No nominations	Forced Eviction (Day 24)											3 (+1)
Rebecca	Tricia; Patrick	Yen; Kazel	Evicted (Day 22)												9
Eslove	Kyra; Devon	Tricia; Yong	Forced Eviction (Day 19)												11
Potz	Tricia; Kazel	Evicted (Day 15)													3
Maichel	Shey; Angelo	Forced Eviction (Day 15)													1 (+1)
Notes	See note 1	See note 2	See note 3	See note 4		See note 5		See note 6		See note 7		See note 8			
Up for eviction	Angelo; Eslove; Maichel; Patrick; Potz; Tricia	Eslove; Rebecca; Tricia; Yen	Devon; Joe; Kyra; Patrick; Shey	Ann; April; Carson	Angelo; Jovic; Tricia; Yen; Yong	Carson; Richard; Sophia	Angelo; Ivan; Kazel; Tricia; Yen	Jack; James; Jenny; Sophia	Angelo; Joe; Patrick; Tricia	Bret; Devon; Jenny; Tricia		Ann; Bret; James; Jenny; Ryan	Ann; Bret; James; Ryan	Open Voting	
Saved from eviction	Tricia; 41.48% Eslove; 21.20% Patrick; 16.63% Angelo; 15.16%	Tricia; 57.27% Yen; 33.87%	Patrick; 42.49% Joe; 22.75% Devon; 19.97%	Ann; 52.54% Carson; 24.13%	Tricia; 42.49% Angelo; 20.25% Yen; 17.05%	Sophia; 43.76%	Tricia; 43.33% Ivan; 18.43% Angelo; 16.80%	James; 68.86% Jenny; 14.59%	Tricia; 53.28% Angelo; 23.79%	Bret; Devon; Jenny; Tricia	Bret; 9.12% Jenny; 2.62% Devon -3.50%	Ann; Bret; James; Ryan	Housemate D 17.64% Housemate G 17.01% Housemate B 16.11% Housemate C 13.78% Housemate A 12.05% Housemate F 8.78%	James; 19.75%	
Evicted	Potz; 5.53%	Rebecca; 8.86%	Kyra; 14.79%	April; 23.33%	Yong; 11.67% Jovic; 8.54%	Richard; 34.06% Carson; 22.18%	Yen; 15.29% Kazel; 6.15%	Sophia; 12.24% Jack; 4.31%	Patrick; 17.33% Joe; 5.60%	No; Eviction	Tricia -5.76%	No; Eviction	Ann; 14.63%	Ryan; 18.70% Fretzie; 15.99% Devon; 15.74% Ivan; 15.14% Bret; 14.68%	
Forced Eviction	Maichel	Eslove	Shey	none						Angelo	none	Jenny	none	Ryan; 18.70% Fretzie; 15.99% Devon; 15.74% Ivan; 15.14% Bret; 14.68%	

Legend

Bold Italicized name Indicates that the housemate was saved from the final nomination round and eviction nights because he/she already filled one of the last three slots in the group. It happened that the group was Pinoy and since Tricia left the house, which enabled Devon, Fretzie and Ivan to complete the last three slots of Pinoy in the Big Night. However the names of final 3 Pinoy housemates were not revealed during the final eviction of the Teenternational housemate, which happened to be Ann's.
– Housemates from Group A
– Housemates from Group B
– Pinoy Housemates
– Teenternational Housemates
- Automatic Nomination (due to violation(s) committed, as a reward for the winning house)

^Note 1: Maichel was given an automatic nomination for various rule violations. After the nominations, Joe and Tricia switched houses. Four days after nominations, Maichel committed more violations by sleeping at the wrong time and talking without the lapel microphone on, causing his forced eviction.
^Note 2: After the announcement of nominations on Day 16, the two sets of housemates would merge into one House, the Villa. On Day 19, Eslove was given a forced eviction due to violent threats against several housemates. He exited shortly after he was told of the eviction and was replaced later by Jovic.
^Note 3: Jovic nominated Patrick, Tricia, and Yong as part of his so-told nomination duty. However, Big Brother nullified his nomination and instead gave Shey the forced eviction for discussing the nomination process three separate times (a clear violation of House rules) and meted automatic nominations to Joe, Patrick, Devon, and Kyra for participating in those conversations.
^Note 4: Akin to actual voting in the Philippine elections the next day, the housemates nominated their choices using ballots and different colored ink markers; red-shaded ovals are valued at two points each and a point per black-shaded ones. All voting was for the eviction of one Teenternational and two Philippine housemates.
^Note 5: Voting was for the eviction of two housemates each from the Teenternationals and the Philippine housemates.
^Note 6: Like the week before, voting was for the eviction of two housemates each from the Teenternationals and the Philippine housemates. But nominations would come from the opposite group (i.e. the Philippine housemates nominated the Teenternationals and vice versa). Announcement of nominations were supposed to take place on Day 44, but was postponed to the next day due to time constraints.
^Note 7: For this week, the vote-to-save and vote-to-evict system was adapted, with only one among the four nominees evicted at the end of the week. The housemates freely nominated from both Pinoy and Teenternational housemates. The top two point gatherers from each group were then nominated. Angelo was given forced eviction due to medical reasons. The voting was stopped during Day 53 as Angelo and James were brought to the hospital for a series of medical examinations. While voting eventually resumed, the eviction that was supposed to take place on Day 57 was postponed to Day 63 due to Angelo's forced eviction on Day 54.
^Note 8: For the final weeks of the edition, all voting was for the winner. But with the three Filipino members of the Big 6 already determined by Tricia's ouster, the last evictions would determine the three Teenternationals in the final group with the two lowest ranked Teenternationals among all eight housemates would be evicted. On Day 67, Jenny was informed of her Forced Eviction, after the Teenternational Housemates and the Pinoy Housemates were not able to separately make a unanimous decision by group on whom to evict from the other group. Jenny was given special tasks before making her exit on Day 71. Partial results of voting as of 9PM of Day 71 was revealed to the public, with Ann taking the first spot, Bret the 3rd spot and Ivan taking the 5th spot. The voting was however kept on-going. Since Ann, the lowest ranked Teenternational, was also voted fourth overall at the time of eviction, it could be deduced that the Philippine housemates composed the bottom three.

=== S–E voting system result ===
Below is the eviction voting result from the eight eviction round.

Eviction No.	Nominated Housemate	Votes			Result
Eviction No.	Nominated Housemate	To-Save	To-Evict	Net	Result
8	Bret	11.22%	-2.10%	9.12%	Saved
8	Devon	10.45%	-13.95%	-3.50%	Saved
8	Jenny	3.44%	-0.83%	2.62%	Saved
8	Tricia	26.12%	-31.89%	-5.76%	Evicted

== Unite at The Big Night ==
Unite at the Big Night logo.

The Big Night Finale of this edition, dubbed as Unite at the Big Night, was held on June 26, 2010, at Ynares Center located in Antipolo, Rizal. Like the previous Teen Edition's finale, the show had a sci-fi theme with the emphasis on robots. Tying with theme, the House was seemingly transformed into a giant robot that brought the housemates into the venue. In fact, the room where the housemates were held before they were each brought out resembled a pilot's cockpit.

The ex-housemates joined Sam Concepcion and Miles in their rendition of "Pyramid". Guests also included Double Up winner Melisa Cantiveros, first Teen Edition housemate Matt Evans, Pilipinas Got Talent finalists Keith Clark Delleva, the Velasco Brothers, and Jovit Baldivino, and the Homeless World Cup Philippine team.

First to leave the cockpit-inspired makeshift confession room was the 6th Big Placer Bret garnering 133,239 votes or 14.68% and received ₱100,000. Ivan soon followed as the 5th Big Placer amassing 137,402 votes translating to 15.14% of the total votes and received also ₱100,000. Following Ivan was 4th Big Placer Devon with a total votes of 142,876 or 15.74% and granted ₱200,000 in cash prize. The 3rd Big Placer was Fretzie with a total of 145,176 or 15.99% of the total votes and won ₱300,000. The runner-up for this edition was Ryan who had 169,797 votes or 18.7% and took home ₱500,000.

James Reid was proclaimed the winner of the Edition, earning 179,294 votes or 19.75% of all votes cast. James won ₱1,000,000 (plus the same amount to a chosen charity), a laptop computer, a 42-inch flat screen TV, an Asian tour package, a bottled water business, and a condominium unit.

This table shows the summary of votes as obtained by each of the Big 6 in the Big Night.

Event	Big 6	Votes		Result
Event	Big 6	Actual Votes	Percentage	Result
Big Night	Bret	133,239	14.68%	6th Place
Big Night	Devon	142,876	15.74%	4th Place
Big Night	Fretzie	145,176	15.99%	3rd Place
Big Night	Ivan	137,402	15.14%	5th Place
Big Night	James	179,294	19.75%	Winner
Big Night	Ryan	169,797	18.70%	Runner-Up
TOTAL VOTES		907,784 votes	100%	—N/a

== Notable people ==
Alden Richards and Nadine Lustre both auditioned for Pinoy Big Brother: Teen Clash 2010 but failed to make it to the final line-up.

Preceded by Double Up	Pinoy Big Brother Teen Clash 2010 (April 4 – June 26, 2010)	Succeeded by Unlimited
