= Dar Bernardo =

Filipino actor, comedian and politician

- Born: Darylle Francis Bernardo Salvador; April 14, 1992 (age 34); Malolos, Bulacan, Philippines
- Other name: Darylle
- Occupations: Model, actor
- Years active: 2011–2015
- Height: 5 ft 7 in (1.70 m)
- Partner: Gemma Magdales (2015)
- Children: 1

Darylle Francis Bernardo Salvador (born April 14, 1992) is a Filipino television actor, model and singer. He started as a commercial model until his debut as an actor in a primetime series under ABS-CBN, Ina, Kapatid, Anak in 2013.

== Life and career ==
=== 1992–2012: Early life and discovery ===
Bernardo started joining male beauty pageants and won a number of titles. He also started as model for various clothing lines in the Philippines such as Natasha and RUSS. In 2009, he enrolled at Bulacan State University in Malolos, Bulacan under the General Engineering course. In 2010, he became a model and print ad endorser of 3D Fitness Studio and later became one of the "Cosmopolitan 69 Bachelors" of Cosmo Magazine. In 2012, he joined the Mr. Reflector pageant sponsored by the province's newspaper, The Reflector wherein he ended up 2nd place. In the same year, he was the representative of Central Luzon for the Mr. and Ms. State Colleges and Universities Athletic Association (SCUAA) National Olympics held at the Cultural Center of the West Visayas State University in La Paz, Iloilo City wherein he was declared as "Mr. National SCUAA Olympics 2012". Aside from winning the title role, he also garnered 3 miscellaneous awards: "Best in Festival Costume", "Best in Swimwear" and "Best in Barong Tagalog".

=== 2013–present: Career beginnings ===
Bernardo also joined various reality search programs under his name, Darylle Salvador. He attended singing and dancing workshops when he changed his manager, and was eventually launched as a member of an all-male singing group, The 5ive along with Bryan Olano, Leon Eustaquio, Mykel Ong and Tres Gonzales in March 2013. He began as a television actor through Ina, Kapatid, Anak, a drama series produced by ABS-CBN. In 2013, he appeared in various commercials, one of them for Solaire, the newest entertainment casino in Manila, Philippines. He also appeared in several advertisements of PLDT, Smart Communications and Canon. Bernardo also appeared in political advertisements by former San Juan City mayor, JV Ejercito who ran for Senator in the Philippines in the 2013 midterm elections.

== Filmography ==
=== Television ===
Year	Title	Role
2014	It's Showtime	Gandang Lalake Contestant
2013	Ina, Kapatid, Anak	Diego Media
