= Ron Macapagal =

Filipino singer and actor (born 1997)

- Birth name: Johnron Ramos Macapagal
- Born: April 27, 1998 (age 27)
- Occupations: Singer; actor
- Years active: 2019–Present
- Labels: PolyEast Record

Johnron Ramos Macapagal (born April 27, 1998), also known as Ron Macapagal or Bidaman Ron, is a Filipino actor and singer. He became well known as a top 6 grand finalist of BidaMan, a search for the next leading man and a segment of ABS-CBN noontime show, “It’s Showtime.” He has appeared in several TV dramas and films. In late 2020, he signed with PolyEast Records to release his debut single “Bakit Di Pagbigyan”.

== Discography ==
Singles
Year	Title	Album	Label	ref
2021	Bakit 'Di Pagbigyan	Non-album singles	PolyEast Record	
2021	Lilim	Non-album singles	PolyEast Record	
2022	Bakit Bawal Kitang Mahalin	Non-album singles	PolyEast Record	

== Filmography ==
=== Television ===
Year	Month/Date	Program	Note(s)	Ref.
2019	Jan - Dec	It's Showtime		

=== Film ===
Year	Title	Role	Notes	Ref.
2018	Wild and Free	Jay-R Ramos	Jake's Friend	
2019	Time & Again	Troy		
2020–2021	Pearl Next Door	Gino		

== Awards and nominations ==
Name of the award ceremony, year presented, award category, nominee(s) of the award, and the result of the nomination
Award ceremony	Year	Category	Recipient(s) and nominee(s)	Result	Ref.
Pelikulang Juan Film	2020	Best Actor	Ron Macapagal (Ama ka ng Anak mo)	Won	
Druk international film festival bhutan	2020	Best Actor	Ron Macapagal (Covered Candor)	Won	
Urubatti international film festival	2020	Best Actor	Ron Macapagal (Love Child)	Won	
6th urduha Film festival	2020	Best Actor	Ron Macapagal	Won	
Entertainment Philippines	2019	Outstanding Man of the year 2019	Ron Macapagal	Won	
3RD LAGUNA EXCELLENCE AWARDS.	2021	Outstanding New Male Recording Artist of the Year	Ron Macapagal (Bakit 'Di Pagbigyan)		
PMPC 34th Star awards for TV	2021	BEST NEW MALE TV PERSONALITY	Ron Macapagal	Nominated	
