= Slater Young =

Filipino actor, businessman and engineer (born 1987)

- Born: Jan Slater Lee Young; December 19, 1987 (age 38)
- Education: University of San Carlos (BS)
- Occupations: Engineer, actor, television personality, model
- Years active: 2011–2014; 2021–present
- Agent: Star Magic (2012–2014)
- Known for: Pinoy Big Brother: Unlimited
- Height: 1.78 m (5 ft 10 in)
- Spouse: Kryz Uy (m. 2019)
- Children: 3

Jan Slater Lee Young (born December 19, 1987) is a Filipino engineer, businessman, actor, model and television personality from Cebu. Young is best known for winning Pinoy Big Brother: Unlimited in 2012.

== Early life and education ==
Young was born on December 19, 1987 to a Chinese-Filipino family. He is the eldest among four children – having a brother and two sisters. His father, John Young was involved in a steel building manufacturing company based in Mandaue.

Young attended the Sacred Heart School-Jesuit (now Ateneo de Cebu) for his elementary and high school studies. He graduated from the University of San Carlos in Talamban, Cebu City where he obtained his degree in civil engineering.

== Entertainment career ==
=== Pinoy Big Brother: Unlimited ===
Slater Young who has been accompanying his father working in the construction industry considered starting a career in showbusiness. Young signed with Cornerstone Talent Management Center and underwent an workshop witn Pen Medina for six weeks. Cornerstone manager Erickson Raymundo encouraged Young to try to get selected as a housemate for Pinoy Big Brother: Unlimited

Young was eventually selected and entered the reality show as part of the first batch that entered the house. He became known as "The Hotshot Engineer of Cebu". On Day 155 – the Big Night at the Grandstand (March 31, 2012), he was proclaimed as the show's first male Big Winner of a Pinoy Big Brother regular season. He garnered a total of 40.02% of votes with 18.58% lead from 2nd Big Placer, Pamu Pamorada.

=== Post-Big Brother ===
Weeks after his winning, Young made several guest appearances in the network and with the premier of the new season of Pinoy Big Brother only a week after his victory, speculations rose that he is pressured of debuting quickly to the entertainment industry. On April 13, Young played his first acting role as a guest star in the series finale of E-Boy opposite Jessy Mendiola. On April 28, Young continued his acting stint via the drama anthology Maalaala Mo Kaya as Andrei with veteran actress, Dimples Romana, and PBB: Unlimited's 4th Big Placer, Paco Evangelista.

Young has since retired from showbiz and decided to focus on his own business, manufacturing lightweight concrete called LiteBlock.

== Engineering career ==
Young was involved in the designing of the mountainside condominum The Rise at Monterrazas in Cebu City a project that raised concerns of flooding by environmental groups. The project also won the Architizer A+ jury award in 2024.

== Personal life ==
On February 28, 2018, Young became engaged to his girlfriend, author and blogger Kryz Uy. The couple married nearly a year later, on February 17, 2019, during a luxurious but intimate ceremony at Shangri-La's Mactan Resort & Spa in Cebu. On December 1, 2019, they announced on social media that they were expecting their first child. Scott Knoa was born on June 2, 2020, Sevi was born on May 25, 2022 and underwent inguinal hernia surgery. Saxon Kent was born on June 23, 2024.

== Filmography ==
=== Film ===
Year	Title	Role
2012	Kimmy Dora and the Temple of Kiyeme	Cameo Role
2012	The Reunion	Bryan

=== Television ===
Year	Title	Role
2011–2012	Pinoy Big Brother: Unlimited	Housemate/Big Winner
2012	E-Boy	Miyo (adult)
2012	Pinoy Big Brother: Uber 2012	Regular Guest
2012	Maalaala Mo Kaya: Kape	Andrei
2012	Matanglawin	Guest host
2012	Sarah G. Live	Guest host
2012	Gandang Gabi, Vice!	Guest
2012	Wansapanataym: Magic Shoes	Announcer
2012	A Beautiful Affair	Harry Reyes
2012–2013	Ina, Kapatid, Anak	Antonio Lagdameo Jr.
2013–2014	Umagang Kay Ganda	Guest host
2013–2014	Maalaala Mo Kaya: Walis	Pinky's husband
2013–2014	Juan dela Cruz	Tony
2013–2014	ASAP	Himself / Co-host / Performer
2013–2014	Pinoy Big Brother: All In: Ubertime Online	Host
2021	Pinoy Big Brother: Connect	Mentor

== Awards and nominations ==
Year	Organization	Category	Work	Results	Ref.
2011		Big Winner	Pinoy Big Brother: Unlimited	Won	
2012	26th PMPC Star Awards for Television	Best New Male TV Personality	Wansapanataym: Magic Shoes	Nominated	

Preceded by James Reid	Pinoy Big Brother; Big Winner; 2011	Succeeded by Myrtle Sarrosa
Preceded by Melisa Cantiveros	Pinoy Big Brother Regular Season; Big Winner; 2011	Succeeded by Daniel Matsunaga
