= Pinoy Big Brother: All In =

Coordinates: 14°38′20″N 121°02′05″E

- Season 5
- Presented by: Toni Gonzaga; Bianca Gonzalez; Robi Domingo; John Prats; Alex Gonzaga; Slater Young; Joj & Jai Agpangan
- No. of days: 120
- No. of housemates: 19
- Winner: (Brazil) Daniel Matsunaga
- Runner-up: Maris Racal

Release
- Original network: ABS-CBN
- Original release: April 27 – August 24, 2014

Season chronology
- ← Previous; Unlimited Next → 737

The fifth season of the reality game show Pinoy Big Brother, subtitled All In aired on ABS-CBN for 120 days from April 27 to August 24, 2014.

This season marked a Big Brother first worldwide: adult civilians, teenagers and celebrities lived in one house and competed altogether for the prize. Due to the mixed contestant types, this season is referred to as a "special edition". Later seasons of the show would follow suit, albeit with different formats and twists. The season's number continues with the numbering of the previous seasons. (Note: The reason why this season is numbered five is because the show had produced four civilian and teen seasons, and two celebrity seasons as of this season in 2014 (which are assigned on the first and second season eras, respectively). The "first season" era consists of Season 1, Celebrity 1, and Teen 1, while the "second season" era consists of Season 2, Celebrity 2, and Teen Edition Plus, the "third season" era consists of Double Up and Teen Clash 2010, and the "fourth season" era consists of Unlimited and Teen Edition 4. That is why, when the show's producers decided to combine all of the editions into a single season, this season's number was assigned to five rather than one to continue the numerology.) This numbering would be followed by the next seasons produced by the show.

Brazilian model, actor, and footballer Daniel Matsunaga emerged as the season's winner, becoming the third celebrity to win in the franchise after Ruben Gonzaga won Pinoy Big Brother: Celebrity Edition 2 in 2008. Teen housemate Maris Racal was the runner-up, while celebrity housemate Jane Oineza and civilian housemate Vickie Rushton were the third and fourth placers, respectively.

== Development ==
Lauren Dyogi, the Director and Business Unit Head of the show, confirmed the show was renewed for a fifth season and audition schedules were soon to be announced. The network officially announced the auditions on September 15, 2013, during an episode in The Voice of the Philippines. The official air date was not revealed in the announcement.

=== Auditions ===
Cities in the Philippines where the auditions for the Pinoy Big Brother: All In were held.

Initially the auditions for the fifth season were to be held on October 6, 2013, at the Quezon Memorial Circle in Quezon City as part of the network's 60th anniversary celebration. However, the said auditions venue was postponed due to security and logistical issues. On November 30, 2013, it was announced that, for the first time in the franchise, there would be online auditions through one-minute video submissions. Online auditions ran from December 1, 2013, until January 15, 2014. On March 27, Dyogi announced that 33,064 people auditioned, of which 11,265 were online auditions. Due to casting problems, a special audition was held in Smart Araneta Coliseum on April 15, 2014, where 11,000 people auditioned. A special online audition was opened on the same day and ended by midnight. Overall, a total of more than 44 thousand people auditioned for this season.

The following were the audition schedules of Pinoy Big Brother: All In:

Date	Location	Venue	Source
Adults (open to 18 to 35 years old)
October 27, 2013	Davao City	Abreeza	
November 22, 2013	Mandaue City, Cebu	Pacific Mall	
January 18, 2014	Quezon City	Pinoy Big Brother Hall	
Teens (open to 15 to 17 years old)
October 26, 2013	Davao City	Abreeza	
November 24, 2013	Mandaue City, Cebu	Pacific Mall	
February 1, 2014	Marikina	Marikina Sports Complex	
Adults and teens (open to 15 to 30 years old)
April 15, 2014	Quezon City	Smart Araneta Coliseum	

=== Promotion ===
In April 2014, promotional teasers were aired. The first teaser was an audition video of Kim Chiu, the franchise's first teen winner. Another teaser was aired about the love story of Melai Cantiveros and Jason Francisco who became lovers inside the show and were now married. A grand mini reunion, attended by some of the former housemates of the Regular, Celebrity and Teen Seasons and hosts of the show, was also held at ASAP 19 on April 20.

=== Scheduling ===
In an interview aired February 10, 2014, on Banana Nite, Toni Gonzaga confirmed that the show will return in March 2014. It was later moved on April 27, 2014. The show will occupy the vacated timeslot of The Biggest Loser Pinoy Edition: Doubles. The show's companion show, Pinoy Big Brother: All In Über, was aired weekdays as part of the Kapamilya Gold block.

As part of the franchise, this season introduced an online companion show. An online discussion called "Twitter Hangout" on Twitter every Thursdays, starting on March 27, 2014, was also introduced. Every Thursday night in the online Twitter discussion, Business Unit head of the franchise Lauren Dyogi, the hosts, and former housemates will answer the questions of the netizens.

The show aired at 10:15 p.m. (PST) every Mondays to Fridays; 9:30 p.m. (PST) every Saturdays; and 9:45 p.m. (PST) every Sundays.

=== Kick-off ===
On April 27, 2014, the show introduced two housemates in ASAP 19 and three housemates in Buzz ng Bayan, which were both ahead of Pinoy Big Brother's timeslot. The rest of the housemates were introduced in the show itself later that night.

== Overview ==
=== House ===
The house layout for this season remained unchanged since Pinoy Big Brother: Teen Edition 4, except for the decors which was inspired by the Amaia Land brand of Ayala Land. It is decorated with neo-modern style with light pastel colors. The season also retained the house's pool. On Day 14, Big Brother revealed the picnic area, the refurbished activity area used in the previous seasons. This is the second consecutive season not to use a second house.

=== Hosts ===
On November 6, 2013, Toni Gonzaga was officially confirmed to return as the main host of the show. Also, according to Lauren Dyogi, both Bianca Gonzalez and Robi Domingo were expected to return to co-host the show.

In late March 2014, John Prats was confirmed to return and reprise his previous hosting duties. In the season's grand press conference held on April 23, it was announced that Gonzaga will reprise her hosting stints just like in the previous seasons. On the other hand, Domingo will be the segment host of Pinoy Big Brother Update, which will air every afternoons and evenings, and will be joining Prats, and Gonzalez on Pinoy Big Brother: All In Über. Gonzalez, Domingo, and Prats will also join Gonzaga during eviction nights. Alex Gonzaga was also confirmed to join the show as one of the new hosts. Aside from the main hosts, Slater Young, together with Joj and Jai will take the helm of Pinoy Big Brother: All In Übertime, an online late-night show.

Mariel Rodriguez was also rumored to return as host, after being absent for two consecutive seasons. This was later debunked by the hosts during the grand press conference.

=== Prizes ===
The Big Winner received an Asian tour for two, a brand new 30 square-meter condominium unit at the Amaia Steps Novaliches in Brgy. Novaliches, Quezon City, two business franchises and ₱1,000,000. The second, third and fourth placers will receive ₱500,000, ₱300,000 and ₱200,000, respectively. All finalists also received an entertainment package from Sony.

=== Twists ===
- All In: As part of the season's twist, the show will have a mix of teen, adult, and celebrity housemates; a first in the show and in the entire Big Brother franchise.
- Vote to Nominate (BBN): The public is given a chance to nominate a housemate for eviction. This was implemented in the first two nomination nights.
- Immunity Challenges: Several challenges were held in the house which granted immunity from being nominated to the winner. This was only held during the third nomination night.
- Insta Save: All nominated housemates will have the chance to remove themselves from being nominated if ever they have finished a task or won a challenge the fastest. This was only held during the 4th, 6th and 10th Nomination Nights.
- Various Nominations: Various nomination processes were implemented as per Big Brother. See Nomination history for details.
- Nomination Challenges: Nominations are solely based on various series of challenges. The list of nominees will consist of housemates who failed various series of challenges.
- Overnight Voting: In some eviction nights, people will only be given 24 hours to vote for their favorite housemate.
- SE Voting System: Carried over from previous seasons, the public is given the chance to vote to save or evict a housemate. The housemate with the lowest net votes, Save and Evict votes combined, is evicted. This system was implemented for the last the two weeks leading to the Big Night.
- Power of One: For the Big Night, the public may only vote once per day per mobile phone number.

== Housemates ==
The cast of Pinoy Big Brother: All In (L–R): Chevin, Aina, Manolo, Axel, Cess, Daniel, Vickie, Fourth, Ranty, Jane, Cheridel, Nichole, Loisa, Joshua, Jayme, Jacob, Fifth, Michele, Maris, and Alex (houseguest)

A total of 229 individuals were shortlisted for this season, of which 22 were presented to the management of the show for the final casting. From the 229 shortlisted, 11 came from the Davao auditions, 22 from the Cebu auditions, 138 from the Manila auditions, 22 from online auditions, and 3 were referrals. Due to casting problems, a special audition was held in Smart Araneta Coliseum on April 15, 2014, where 11,000 people auditioned. A special online audition was also opened on the same day and ended by midnight. Overall, a total of more than 44 thousand people auditioned for this season.

On April 25, Dyogi shared that there will be 18 housemates for this season. Two housemates were first revealed on ASAP 19, while three housemates were revealed on Buzz ng Bayan. The remaining 12 housemates were revealed during the kick-off, plus the surprise inclusion of actress Alex Gonzaga.

Name	Age on entry	Type	Hometown	Entered	Exited	Result	Refs.
Daniel Matsunaga	25	Celebrity	Makati	Day 21	Day 120	Winner	
Maris Racal	16	Teen	Davao	Day 1	Day 120	Runner-up	
Jane Oineza	17	Celebrity	Pasig	Day 1	Day 120	3rd Place	
Vickie Rushton	21	Regular	Bacolod	Day 1	Day 120	4th Place	
Loisa Andalio	15	Teen	Parañaque	Day 1	Day 119	Evicted	
Joshua Garcia	16	Teen	Batangas	Day 1	Day 113	Evicted	
Manolo Pedrosa	16	Teen	Quezon City	Day 1	Day 106	Evicted	
Fifth Pagotan	22	Regular	Pasay	Day 1	Day 99	Evicted	
Fourth Pagotan	22	Regular	Pasay	Day 1	Day 85	Evicted	
Cheridel Alejandrino^{1}	26	Celebrity	Olongapo City	Day 49	Day 78	Evicted	
Nichole Baranda	15	Teen	Makati	Day 1	Day 64	Evicted	
Michele Gumabao	21	Celebrity	Quezon City	Day 1	Day 57	Evicted	
Jayme Jalandoni	23	Regular	Las Piñas	Day 1	Day 57	Evicted	
Ranty Portento	26	Regular	Quezon	Day 1	Day 56	Evicted	
Alex Gonzaga	26	Celebrity Houseguest	Rizal	Day 1	Day 49	Exited	
Aina Solano	21	Regular	Boracay	Day 1	Day 42	Evicted	
Jacob Benedicto	21	Regular	Parañaque	Day 1	Day 35	Evicted	
Axel Torres	19	Regular	Taguig	Day 1	Day 28	Evicted	
Cess Visitacion	19	Regular	Valenzuela	Day 1	Day 21	Forced eviction	
Chevin Cecilio	22	Regular	Camarines Sur	Day 1	Day 21	Evicted	

Note

1. ^1 On Day 49, Cheridel Alejandrino entered the house and her status was not yet known. She was declared as an official housemate on Day 69.

=== Houseguests ===
Similar to the franchise's previous seasons, Big Brother invited guests to his house for special purposes. One notable was Alex Gonzaga who was first introduced as a housemate. Her true status was revealed on Day 7 when Big Brother confirmed that she was only a houseguest. She is by far the second longest tenured houseguest, behind Mariel Rodriguez whose tenure inside the house lasted for 73 days. She exited on Day 49. Nineteenth housemate, Cheridel Alejandrino, was introduced as a houseguest after the departure of Alex Gonzaga during day 49 until day 69.

Other houseguests were Bea Alonzo and Paulo Avelino, Daniel Padilla and Kathryn Bernardo, John Prats and Robi Domingo, Pokwang and Zanjoe Marudo, Sandara Park, Vice Ganda, Piolo Pascual, Jason Abalos, Jeron Teng, Enchong Dee, Erich Gonzales, Jason Gainza, Cathy Garcia-Molina, Judy Ann Santos, Tirso Cruz III, Gerald Anderson, Angelica Panganiban, Bianca Gonzalez, Herbert Bautista, Kris Aquino and Korina Sanchez. Previous winners of the franchise also visited the house: Kim Chiu, Keanna Reeves, Slater Young, Myrtle Sarrosa, and James Reid.

== Chronology of events ==
This is a summary of events that happened inside the House, including the housemates' tasks, nominations, evictions, and other important events. in this case, April 27, 2014, is designated as Day 1.

=== Week 1 ===
The first eighteen housemates were introduced in three different programs. Axel and Jane were introduced during ASAP 19, while Cess, Nichole, and Chevin were introduced in Buzz ng Bayan. The remaining thirteen housemates were introduced in the pilot show, including the unexpected eighteenth housemate, Alex. All housemates were welcomed through a pool party, after which, they were allowed to tour the house. They got their luggages at the storage room. Alex's luggage contained only a pair of underwear inside. The following day, Big Brother gave them their first weekly task, "Hating Kapatid", wherein they have to divide among themselves equally the household chores, the food, and the shower time, among other things. They were only given five mistakes to do the task. Hours after Big Brother gave the weekly task, the housemates had already made two mistakes: one for not equally sharing their lunch and another for the chips they ate.

The following evening, Big Brother tasked Jacob to look for one housemate whom he thinks needs singing lessons. He picked Manolo. If Jacob can teach Manolo sing, he and the other housemates will share Japanese food for lunch in his upcoming birthday. He was also instructed to sing a song with Manolo. They sang Sunday Morning in the morning of Day 4 as a wake-up call. Fourth and Fifth updated Big Brother the next day on their secret task. In the evening, the housemates were called to the living room to unlock a padlocked chest. Inside it are pictures and gifts from their respective siblings. They later shared who their siblings are and how important they are to them. Afterwards, Fourth and Fifth continued their investigation.

On Day 5, Big Brother gave Fourth, Jayme, and Ranty a special task that is related to Labor Day. Each of them had to teach one housemate some skills from their respective professions. Afterwards, as part of the Hating Kapatid weekly task, each housemate has to hold a tray of 18 glasses for ten minutes. They were only given three times to make mistakes. Maris, Loisa, and Cess all failed this task, therefore a pie was removed from the screen. Big Brother told all the housemates in the confession room the next day that the remaining two pies will be removed from the screen in order for them to watch out for the mistakes they will incur. Later that day, Aina was tasked to choreograph a new dance routine using the modified "Pinoy Ako" theme song. The dance routine, which was part of the weekly task, was performed in the evening of Day 7 during the live show. Big Brother announced that only one piece of pie was left and that for the first part of their weekly task, they were successful. However, he announced that the second part of the weekly task was actually Fourth and Fifth's special task. The twins said in front of the other housemates that they suspect Jayme and Maris as siblings. Big Brother announced that other than the twins, there are no other siblings inside the house. Therefore, he declared the whole task as a failure. Afterwards, Big Brother called Alex to the confession room and told her that she is not an official housemate but only a houseguest.

=== Week 2 ===
The housemates receive their second weekly task, #SELFIEMATES, where their goal is to take 3,000 selfies of themselves under rules set by Big Brother. All selfies shall be taken by using a big hand that can hold a smartphone. The roulette shall determine how many housemates or who among them shall be included in the selfie. All selfies should only be taken on the stage and with the hand, but Michele initially disregarded this rule saying that it is easier to make selfies with few people without using the hand. However, since all selfies should be taken by using the hand, all selfies taken without it will not be counted.

During lunch on Day 9, Axel, along with other male housemates were about to prepare some chips to be included in the meals due to the whole group's lack of food situation. However, Michele reprimanded Axel's group not to eat those chips in order to save food; Alex seconded Michele's idea. When Axel was about to stand up from the dining table, Alex began asking others to eat the chips, which made err of Axel of being left out and stopped of his cravings. Axel immediately walked out while Alex and others continued eating the chips. Later at the pool, Axel shared his emotions to other housemates. A series of talks with Big Brother followed leading to confrontations of Axel and Alex, and of Axel and Michele. Both female housemates later asked their apologies to Axel. Meanwhile, Alex picked Fifth to become her co-host in her talk show. In relation to the talk show, Alex asked Fifth on what topic they should make as headline. Fifth responded that they should talk about the issue about the chips. Alex asked details on who were involved in the said issue and asked for clarifications if she was involved. Fifth suggested that she should ask the other housemates instead. On Day 10, Alex and Fifth started their talk show. Nichole, the first housemate they interviewed, shared how close she was to her mother, Phoemela Baranda. Later that day, Alex and Michele were told of Nichole's picture showing her middle finger, and talked to her about it. Big Brother let her realize that she should not take photos of herself that may be offensive to others.

Big Brother introduced two twists in taking selfies. On Day 11, a dice will be tossed after spinning the roulette. The face on top will determine what the housemates will wear for the selfie; a "Free" face allows them to wear anything. Big Brother called Nichole, Aina, Axel, Alex, and Chevin to the confession room for lapel violations and sleeping after the wake-up call. As punishment, he declared all selfies taken before his announcement will not be counted, and the five housemates will only be the ones to continue their weekly task for that day. If one of them steps down from the platform, all selfies taken for the day will not be counted. on Day 12, the roulette was removed since all housemates will be included in the selfies from this day. A colored ball to be drawn from a box will indicate the platform that all housemates will stand on when taking selfies. Later that day, Big Brother declared their weekly task a success after validating 3,357 of their selfies. Big Brother informed them on Day 13 that they will participate in their first nomination later that day. Alex was also able to nominate, but nominations given to her were not included in the final tally since she was only a houseguest. Chevin and Maris were declared the two nominees that were nominated by the housemates the next evening. Loisa was the third nominee; she got the highest percentage of public votes.

=== Week 3 ===
In the morning of Day 15, Big Brother welcomed Gi, Fe and Teresa, the mothers of Manolo, Joshua and Vickie respectively. They were tasked first to clean the rooms of the housemates. Only the three nominees shall see the mothers and help them in their tasks. When these tasks succeed, Manolo, Joshua, and Vickie will have a chance to talk with their mothers and 50 percent of their weekly budget shall be given to them. In the evening, Big Brother informed Loisa that she will be helping Joshua's mother, who does not know how to cook, in cooking Joshua's breakfast. The following evening, Maris and Loisa were tasked by Big Brother to bring Joshua in the picnic area without being noticed by the other housemates. Unknown to Joshua, his mother was hiding behind the camera mirrors of the picnic area. At the picnic area, Big Brother asked Joshua to dance Pandango sa Ilaw. After his dance, he met his mother. Meanwhile, Manolo's and Vickie's mothers were tasked to cook the housemates' dinner for the following evening while the housemates are shooting for their webisodes in the picnic area. Chevin instructed Maris to tell the other housemates that he was in the confession room and that they are not allowed to leave the picnic area without Big Brother's instruction. Later that evening, a series of pranks was made by the boys and the girls to each other until the following day, which led to some confrontations. The next day, Big Brother talked to all the housemates in the confession room and reminded them of the law in the rulebook about cleanliness. He also told them that the teen housemates should not be following the older housemates and that all forms of jokes should have limitations.

Sandara Park entered the Big Brother house on Day 19 as a celebrity houseguest during Über. Prior to this, Big Brother made unexpected changes for their weekly task. The setting of the housemates' third webisode was changed to a Koreanovela. Park, who was also a houseguest in the first Celebrity season, was amazed at the changes made to the house since then. Later, the housemates told her role in the third webisode. Park left the house the same day.

The first, second, and third webisodes were uploaded on Days 17, 18, and 20 respectively. Before the eviction night on Day 21, Big brother declared that the videos accumulated 1,400,305 views, resulting in the success of their weekly task. Chevin was later evicted. Axel and Manolo were given automatic nomination after violating a rule concerning contact with the outside world during Gi's visit. Cess was also involved in the violation, but since she committed other violations, like writing secret messages, whispering, moving furniture and not wearing her lapel, hence, Big Brother forcibly evicted her from the House. Alex, who also had the same violation as Manolo and Axel's, will receive a punishment, since she is only a houseguest. Daniel Matsunaga entered the House as the third celebrity housemate and the eighteenth official housemate.

=== Week 4 ===
The housemates faced the second nomination round. Later that night, Aina, the publicly nominated housemate, and Michele, who topped the nomination from the housemates, completed the list of nominees. Daniel was tasked to lay on the bed floating at the center of the pool that morning and he can only stand up if the housemates were able to guess how to wake him up: all adult housemates together should kiss him. Big Brother told Daniel that he will meet every housemate one by one at the "Magic Corridor." He will give each housemate a ball with a clue to the event they will participate later that evening, which was a pool party. Big Brother announced to the teen housemates that evening that they will have a pool party, with unlimited food and dancing for all and unlimited drinks for adults only. However, the teen housemates were given a curfew. After the curfew, the adult housemates started to drink. The housemates were given a new weekly task the next day, which was similar to the one given in the second season. Except for Daniel, Big Brother asked all housemates to stand first beside the weighing scale to see their initial weight upon entering the house. They will later sit down in it to know their current weight. Jacob was proclaimed as the heaviest housemate at 166 pounds. The eight housemates who weighed heavier than when they entered their house shall lose weight with the help of Daniel. At the end of the week, their weight should be at most their initial weight prior to their entry into the house. Big Brother told the eight housemates who got heavier that they shall lose at least 42 pounds. He also instructed them not to do crash diets.

Big Brother announced on Day 24 that only the two housemates who lost the least weight will continue their weekly task. The process for the third nomination will also be affected. Only Loisa, whose weight did not change, and Nichole, whose weight lowered by only one pound, will continue the weekly task. The housemates will choose to support either Loisa or Nichole in their task. At the end of the week, the housemate who loses less weight and her supporters will be the only housemates to be nominated for the third nomination. Fourth, Joshua, Aina, Jayme, Axel, Vickie, Ranty, and Alex chose Loisa, while Manolo, Jacob, Vickie, Fifth, Jane, Michele, Daniel, and Maris chose Nichole. The following evening, Big Brother gave the housemates a last chance to change their teams, but none changed their teams. At the weigh-in, Nichole weighed 125.6 pounds, a loss of 1.8 percent. Loisa weighed 110.6 pounds, a loss of 2.1 percent. The following day, Big Brother declared their weekly task a success because both Nichole and Loisa lost at least 2 percent of their weight. Loisa weighed 107 pounds, a loss of 5.3 percent from 113 pounds. Nichole weighed 122.8 pounds, a loss of 4 percent from 129 pounds. Loisa's team was safe from the third nomination round. The nominated housemates, including Alex, had an open forum regarding the things they don't like about each other. At the live eviction night on Day 28, Axel was evicted.

=== Week 5 ===
Big Brother tasked the regular, teen, and celebrity housemates to rank another group from the most important to the least important housemate. The celebrities ranked the regulars; the teens ranked the celebrities; and the regulars ranked the teens. After the nomination night, Fourth, Michele, and Maris decided after a debate by Vickie, Manolo, and Jane that the teens were the least important group of housemates; due to this Big Brother made the teens serve as servants to the regular and celebrity housemates. They will also be the only ones to do the household chores. The BBN nomination system was no longer used from the third nomination night onward. In the live nomination night, Jacob, Jane and Maris were declared nominees for eviction. The teens immediately started with their chores on Day 30. Vickie, Jayme, Jacob, Michele, Alex, and Aina, who committed lapel violations, were not allowed to lie down on any furniture or on the floor for 24 hours.

Manolo, Vickie, and Jane were appointed leaders of the new weekly task, Lapislide, with a goal of making towers out of 15,000 sharpened pencils and rolling a ball into it so that it shoots into a small ring. Vickie decided that the teen housemates will be the first to do the task. Big Brother prohibited the housemates from using the couch after Fifth was made by Daniel to exercise on it. Jayme was prohibited from entering in the activity area that day because she wrote using one of the pencils. Fourth and Aina, who were late in entering the activity area, returned to the house; but since they sat on the couch, all housemates were not allowed to sit except for the teens. The six lapel violators were each given a wooden chair on Day 31. They can sit only on this chair and this should not be separated from their body. This punishment was later revoked. Daniel was allowed earlier by Big Brother to become a servant in order to help the teens.

The sharpener was repaired as the weekly task was resumed for the regular housemates, including Ranty, who broke the handle the previous day. The celebrities took over later; then were followed by the teens. The three leaders were later given three hours to sharpen 3,000 pencils at night in order to earn more sharpeners; for accepting the task, they will also carry the responsibility to the task and only the three of them will work on it. Maris was tasked by Big Brother the following morning to count how many pencils Manolo, Vickie, and Jane had sharpened. Only less than 2,200 pencils were sharpened; thus, their task was considered a failure. However, due to the three's hardwork, Big Brother still gave them extra sharpeners. They were asked by Big Brother to whom they will pass the weekly task; they decided not to pass it to anyone and keep the responsibility to themselves.

Big Brother told the teens on Day 33 that he will lift their task as servants if they will clean the picnic area within the duration of the show's theme song. The teens finished the last task and was freed their task as servants. As a reward to their hardship, Nichole received two cup noodles; while Maris and Joshua received guitars from Yeng Constantino. Instructed by Big Brother, Fifth played as Daniel Padilla visiting the house; this served as Loisa's reward. With the approval of Big Brother, Ranty, Michele, and Daniel volunteered to help Manolo, Vickie, and Jane in sharpening the pencils. The next morning, Manolo received a visit of his dog as a reward.

Confrontations arose as the housemates had little time to finish the task. Five hours before the deadline on Day 34, Big Brother told the housemates that everybody can now help with the task. After the 5 remaining hours, the housemates failed to finish the weekly task. However, Big Brother gave the housemates a chance to receive 50% of the weekly budget if they will be able to shoot a ball using the towers they built; they were successful.

The housemates were again tasked to do a debate, but this time through a rap battle. At the live eviction night on Day 35, Jacob, Jane, and Maris sang "Leaving on a Jet Plane", a song they dedicated to themselves. Jacob was later evicted.

=== Week 6 ===
Aina, Ranty, and Joshua were nominated by the housemates on Day 36. However, in a twist called Insta Save, Big Brother gave them a chance to remove themselves from the list of nominees. At the picnic area, they have to reach for a key that will unlock their prison cell while they are locked inside it. To reach the key, they need to use only the items inside each of their cells. Whoever unlocks them first will be instantly removed from the list of nominees. They were also given the chance to ask for help to the other housemates; Aina picked Alex, Joshua picked Loisa, and Ranty picked Jane. Ranty was the first to get the key, but he did not open his cell and gave way to Joshua to gain the Insta Save. Joshua was then removed from the list of nominees.

On Day 37, Big Brother gave them their weekly task, Yes All We Can. The housemates should accept all challenges given to them by Big Brother and they can say "No" only for a maximum of three times. As part of the weekly task, Jane, Loisa, and Vickie allowed themselves to be tanned, which will lead into a beauty pageant later that day. It was judged by Joshua, who was also tanned by the girls. After noticing what Joshua, Jane, and Loisa were doing, Ranty and Aina were tasked to compose a song about teen love, which the regular and celebrity housemates sang.

Nichole, Fourth, Maris, Jayme, and Ranty were offered a "special breakfast" on Day 38, which were actually fried frogs and silkworms. Nichole was the only one of them to say "No". Ranty later brought out of the storage room the silkworms, which everyone had eaten. Jayme was later asked if she wanted to pose as a model for a nude painting. She initially said "Yes", and chose Ranty, Michele, and Daniel to join her. But after Jayme heard her father's opinion and shared it to the other three, they all said "No". Big Brother earlier allowed the housemates to sharpen pencils, which were donated to two public schools in Quezon City.

A problem arose with the cheese in the House on Day 39. As the supply of cheese was about to disappear, someone opened another bottle of cheese. Some arguments occurred regarding this. All housemates talked in the living room the next day about two issues; resolving the cheese problem and cleanliness of the windows and the bathroom. The latter sparked an argument between Aina and Fifth after the latter became irritated by how Aina told her opinion. Alex, Fifth, and Manolo later, opened up an investigation, after which they deduced the suspects to be Jayme, Michele, and Aina. Fourth and Fifth accepted to have a time to bond with each other in the storage room; this allowed them to share their thoughts with one another. However, this caused them to get drunk.

The housemates decided on Day 41 if they want Alex to exit the house. Alex herself wanted to stay inside the House, and she felt that the housemates will want her to stay. But the housemates' decision was part of the weekly task. The teens and the elderly housemates decided not to evict Alex from the house. Alex will remain in the house, but their weekly task failed. In the live eviction night on Day 42, Aina was evicted after garnering 32.47% of votes, which was less than the 67.53% of votes for Ranty.

=== Week 7 ===
On Day 44, each of the housemates were called in the confession room and were asked by Big Brother in who was their best friend in the house. They were given 10 seconds to bring his or her chosen housemate to the confession room. Once they are inside the confession room, they are required to wear a friendship bracelet. The bracelets were removed after all of them, except for Loisa who was sick, have removed thousands of domino bricks in the pool for 20 minutes. In the afternoon, Big Brother gave the weekly task wherein they need to create an artwork that depicts the Philippine flag and the word "Philippines" using the dominoes they collected from the "best friend task". Aired live that night, Big Brother announced the All Out twist wherein they will participate in several challenges in order to save themselves from receiving an automatic nomination. They faced their first challenge after the announcement. As advised by the show's medical team, Loisa was again not allowed to participate in the challenge due to fever. The first challenge was won by Nichole, earning her an immunity for that week. On Day 45, Loisa was cleared of her sickness and joined the second All Out challenge. Nichole and Alex did not take part in it. In this second challenge, each team has to make the longest possible vertical line in the picnic area. Maris, Vickie, and Daniel won the challenge, with their tower measuring 212.4 feet, and gained immunity.

Alex was given by Big Brother a special All Out task on Day 46; she needs to act out a given scene every time the living room monitor will be turned on. At stake on her special task is a ₱100,000 cash prize for a chosen charity. Middle of Alex's task, Zanjoe Marudo and Pokwang visited the housemates. Meanwhile, the remaining non-immune housemates faced their third and last challenge. They were tasked to pass a pingpong ball through an obstacle course. The first to do it were Fifth, Fourth, and Manolo finishing the challenge within 2 minutes and 38 seconds. Jane, Jayme, and Joshua were the second group to do the challenge; they failed to beat the time of the first group. They were also the first three housemates to be automatically nominated. The last group, composed of Loisa, Michele, and Ranty, followed. They were also unable to beat the first group's time indicating that they were the last three housemates to be automatically nominated.

On Day 47, Big Brother told Michele and Fifth that Alex was just a houseguest and that she will be leaving the house by the end of the week. The two of them divulged this to the other housemates; they also told their plan of holding a party for her. They thought of not noticing Alex the next day. For two days, the housemates ignored Alex; with this they were able to get the send-off party for her at the picnic area the next day.

Meanwhile, Ranty, Loisa, and Jane were tasked to sit on each of their own islands in the swimming pool the next day. They are not allowed to leave this island and only Alex can deliver them their needs. Only the three of them will be allowed to communicate with Alex. Later that night, they used only one of the islands, but due to heavy rains that night, they were allowed to step off the island. They were later transferred to the activity area. After the roof was completed, they were transferred back to the island. Alex was given time the next day to "rescue" the three housemates using a life saver within one minute; she was successful.

Meanwhile, many of the dominoes have fallen and the other housemates had to exert extra effort to complete the artwork. Many of these have been caused by mishandling some dominoes, which, when they fall over, caused the succeeding dominoes to also fall. In the evening of Day 48, to finish the weekly task, they were tasked to do a domino fall; they failed to finish the task after three chances. In the live episode aired on Day 49, Alex exited the house. In the same night, Cheridel entered the house.

=== Week 8 ===
On Day 50, Jane and Joshua were confronted by the adult housemates with the special relationship they had. Big Brother also asked the both of them separately on what their true feelings are. On Day 52, Big Brother gave the housemates their weekly task. While doing their weekly task, Bea Alonzo and Paulo Avelino visited the house to distract them. On the evening, Cheridel formally entered the house. She was tasked to know the housemates inside a specially made "elevator". On Day 53, Maris was tasked to teach the housemates a series of ballroom dances. Unknown to her, the task was a test of their Freeze task. In the middle of their ballroom practice and while they were not moving, Geo Garcia, Joshua's father, visited the house. A similar event also happened when Franky, Jason Abalos (Vickie's boyfriend), and Eric Rushton (Vickie's dad) visited the house on Day 54. Abalos was tasked to bring Vickie's letter from her dad. Vickie later read the letter and realized a lot about her identity. The contents of the letter were not disclosed for privacy reasons.

On Day 55, Ranty and Vickie were tasked to teach the housemates about beauty pageants, as the two of them are products of the same. However, in a twist, all housemates had to cross-dress for the pageant, with males to be taught by Vickie and females by Ranty. Ranty and Vickie will be the judges. Big Brother also told the both of them that he will let two photographers document the said event. Unknown to the housemates and most especially to Ranty, one of the photographers is her mother, Lydia. Michele and Joshua won the pageant for the males and females respectively as their alter egos Michael and Josie. At the end of the event, Big Brother froze the housemates. Seizing the moment and as instructed by Big Brother, Ranty's mom revealed herself. Alex Gonzaga also visited the house again after saying that she missed the housemates. She was able to talk with the housemates while they were frozen.

On Day 56, Big Brother announced that for the third straight week, the housemates' weekly task failed because they committed four mistakes, which was more than the maximum limit of three. Later that night, Ranty was the first housemate to be evicted for the All Out twist.

=== Week 9 ===
On Day 57, Kathryn Bernardo and Daniel Padilla visited the housemates and filmed Padilla's new song, Unlimited. In the live episode aired that evening, as part of the All Out twist, Jayme and Michele were evicted. On Day 60, the list of nominees were announced. As part of the All In Nominations, all housemates who received a nomination point regardless of the number of points received will be automatically be part of the nominees. With the said twist, Daniel, Fifth, Jane, Joshua, Loisa, and Nichole were nominated. The Insta Save was again implemented this week with the non-nominated housemates helping the nominees. Non-nominees were required to pick the nominated housemates they would want to help by kicking a football into a 'goal' placed for each of the six nominees. Daniel was picked by Maris, Fifth by Fourth, Joshua by Vickie, Loisa by Cheridel, and Nichole by Manolo. Only Jane had no partner. In the Insta Save challenges, under one hour, each pairs had to shoot a table tennis ball to their partners, thread a table of needles, and form the 'SAVE' word using puzzle pieces. The first to complete, or the first to be able to do the challenges within the allotted time wins the Insta Save. In the end, Jane won.

The housemates, meanwhile, practiced for their Dancing Football weekly task, which was given on Day 59. Daniel was assigned as their leader. The next days were spent on practicing the dance routine. One time, they put the football in the goal. However, these resulted in muscle pains in their feet. On Day 62, they performed the routine in the picnic area. They were given five chances to perform the routine, however, they failed after five attempts. So for the fourth straight week, the housemates failed their weekly task. On Day 63, Joshua and Loisa were saved from eviction.

=== Week 10 ===
On Day 64, Nichole was evicted after receiving the fewest public votes against Daniel and Fifth. On Day 65, the weekly task was introduced. In the weekly task, they were tasked to teach 5 kids an action song they have created. On Day 67, Daniel, Loisa, Manolo and Vickie took part in a special task for Cheridel. In their task, the four housemates had to bike for 2800 laps in order for Cheridel to see his son. On that night, Cheridel's status was revealed. Big Brother told Cheridel that she was only a houseguest. However, her status can only be elevated to "official housemate" if ever they will win the weekly task under her leadership. Cheridel was able to see her son on Day 69 after Daniel, Loisa, Manolo and Vickie won the special task. On the same day, the housemates together with kids performed for their weekly task; they were successful. With their victory, Cheridel became an official housemate.

On that night, the All In 10 twist was announced and commenced immediately after the announcement. The housemates were put into pairs to go against each other: Cheridel versus Maris, Loisa versus Vickie, Manolo versus Fourth, Jane versus Fifth, and Daniel versus Joshua. In the first challenge, they have to guess five items while being blindfolded. Cheridel, Vickie, Fourth, Joshua, and fifth won the challenge. On Day 70, In the second challenge they had to put their pants on without their hands. Maris, Loisa, Fourth, Joshua, and Fifth won the challenge. In the third challenge, they had to solve a puzzle, similar to the mobile game Unblock Me. In the end, Maris, Loisa, Manolo, Daniel and Fifth won the challenge. Fifth received immunity for winning three times, while Jane became the first nominee. In the fourth challenge, the housemates had to arrange the glasses of water to form the tune of the chorus of the theme song Pinoy Ako. Maris, Fourth and Joshua both received immunity after gaining three points, while Daniel, Manolo and Cheridel became the second, third and fourth nominees respectively. Vickie and Loisa were the only pair to play the fifth challenge. In the fifth challenge, the housemates must find among several bags hanging inside the activity area just using their sense of smell. The one who will identify the correct bags fastest will win the challenge. In the end, Vickie won the challenge and received immunity, while Loisa became the last nominee.

=== Week 11 ===
On Day 71, Big Brother gave the Big Divide task and split the house in two groups. The Pagotan twins took the helm as leaders of each group. Jane, Cheridel, Maris, Manolo and Joshua chose Fifth, while Daniel, Vickie and Loisa chose Fourth. The housemates were prohibited from talking to the other group or crossing the border. On the same day, the housemates were informed of their weekly task, Twin or Lose. On Day 72, Joshua was punished to sleep for 24 hours and was not allowed to take a peek, open his eyes, and talk to the housemates due to various violations he incurred during the previous weeks.

On Day 75, Fourth and Fifth's mother, Gloria, visited the house. With her visit, the two and six other housemates were blindfolded while dancing; Daniel and Manolo were spared in order to help Gloria in her task. After that, in the activity area, the twins were tasked to scrub off a dirty board using two toothbrushes. They need to reveal the letters "I-L-O-V-E-Y-O-U-M-A-M-A" (if spelled, is "I LOVE YOU MAMA") while being strapped into a rubber band. They were able to do a Skype video call with their mother, who was pretending to be in Japan. After the video call, Gloria went out to the activity area meeting her two sons.

On Day 77, it was announced that they failed their weekly task. On that night, Jane and Loisa were saved from being evicted. Cheridel, Daniel, and Manolo on the other hand were called by Big Brother to the confession room. They were informed that, between the three of them, the evicted housemate will have the power to save and automatically nominate a housemate. After the live announcements, the two groups had to do a "relay the message" game. If they were able to relay the message to all the housemates correctly, the barrier within the house would be removed. The last housemate should be able to say the correct message; they were successful. The barrier was removed, which also meant that the two groups were again fused into one.

=== Week 12 ===
On Day 78, Cheridel, Daniel, and Manolo voted for whom they will save and automatically nominate. At the live eviction night, Cheridel was evicted. After the eviction, it was revealed that Cheridel voted to save Manolo and automatically nominate Fifth. To facilitate the announcements, John Prats and Robi Domingo delivered the corresponding envelopes to them. Afterwards, John and Robi were instructed by Big Brother to the confession room and informed them that they will stay in the Big Brother house once more in order to challenge the characters of the remaining housemates.

On Day 79, the nominations were again suspended and the immunity challenges were reinstated. For the first challenge, one housemate has to traverse a path to the center of the activity center while balancing a flag. They are only given five times to try the challenge; the housemate with the fastest time wins immunity. In the event that the all housemates failed to finish the challenge, the housemate with the farthest reach wins immunity. Daniel and Joshua were the only housemates who finished the challenge; however, since Daniel has the fastest time, he won the immunity. After the challenge, Big Brother gathered the housemates in the living room, where a big stone was placed. Big Brother asked who are two of them that are tough enough for this week's challenges. Joshua and Fourth stood up and placed their hands in the stone and picked a number. Joshua got #1; while Fourth got #2. Joshua and Fourth chose their teammates alternately; Joshua was first. Joshua picked Jane and Maris, while Fourth picked Vickie and Loisa. Robi and John also picked sides on whom they will coach; John picked Fourth, and Robi picked Joshua. The team who will finish the three challenges faster will receive immunity. At the end of three challenges, Team Joshua won immunity; the other received automatic nomination. After the challenges, the housemates had the chance to hear the opinions of the public about them. They have to choose between good news or bad news.

In the morning of Day 80, Jane was tasked to be the breadwinner of the weekly task. In the afternoon, Robi and John were instructed by Big Brother to leave the house, ending their special task as houseguests. On the other hand, Fifth was affected with the public's comments regarding his sexuality. He later disclosed his sexuality; he told Big Brother that he is a bisexual. His disclosure was the second instance in the franchise, after Rustom Padilla's outing as a homosexual in the first celebrity season.

On Day 84, Jane, Fifth, and Joshua failed to win the weekly task. In the evening, Fifth and Loisa were saved from the eviction. Also, Alex visited the house through a 100-second encounter with Fifth.

Also within this week, Vice Ganda visited the house.

=== Week 13 ===
On Day 85, Fourth was evicted after receiving the least percentage of public votes. The next day, Big Brother gave the new weekly task, The Big Concert, with Maris and Manolo being the task leaders. Later, on an undisclosed day, Maris was informed that she will perform with her family. But first, in a special task, she must attached strings to a big guitar in the activity area. Each string attached would mean one of her family members will be performing with her; she was able to attach two. Daniel helped her and attached one more string.

On Day 87, Jane celebrated her debut. Unknown to her, her housemates have done several tasks in the previous week in order to have a debut party for her. After the surprise from the housemates, Big Brother gave Jane a surprise debut party with her family, close friends and housemates.

On Day 91, the housemates performed their production numbers and were judged by Jason Gainza, Enchong Dee, and Erich Gonzales; they were successful. Also, Maris was able to perform with her parents and her younger sister; they were later given a 100-second encounter by Big Brother.

=== Week 14 ===
On Day 92, Big Brother announced that all housemates were automatically nominated. However, they have the chance to nominate-to-save other housemates or not to save anyone at all. Being voted by none, Fifth, Jane and Joshua were nominated. On Day 98, Fifth was evicted after receiving the fewest votes. On Day 97, the housemates won their Dice Stacking weekly task.

Several events took place in the house this week; however, the exact dates were not known, such as: Piolo Pascual's visit; the outside the house Y.O.L.O. (You Only Live Once) trip of Maris, Loisa, and Manolo; Joshua's confession of his love to Jane; and Jason Abalos' visit to Vickie. The exact start date of the weekly task was also not revealed.

=== Week 15 ===
In the live episode aired on Day 99, the housemates did the live nominations. The most nominated housemate was "evicted." In that instance Manolo received the most points. Unknown to them, the fakely evicted housemate will be separated from 'non-evicted' housemates; they will occupy a secret room. In the succeeding days, more housemates will be fakely evicted. Among them, one will be saved through Insta Save challenge; while the others will face the real eviction.

On Day 100, the housemates had to vote for one of them to be evicted. However, he/she must at least receive four votes. After four rounds of nomination tries, Daniel was fakely evicted. On that night, the 100 Day nomination challenge commenced. They all have to arrange pictures by using small lifesaver-like items number from 1 to 10. The three fastest housemates will be safe; while the two housemates with the longest time to finish the challenge will receive a fake eviction. Vickie was not able to perform the task that day because she was not feeling well, but the next morning, she was able to perform the challenge. In the night of Day 101, the three housemates with the fastest time were declared safe: Joshua, Loisa, and Maris. Jane and Vickie were fakely evicted.

Fifth returned to the house to help in the next Insta Save challenge. Daniel and Manolo had beforehand prepared a cake and painted it. One hundred candles were placed on it, which were lit during the challenge. The four fakely evicted housemates had to extinguish the flames of as many candles as possible while being defended by Joshua, Loisa, Maris, and Fifth. Both parties used different improvised materials to defend or extinguish the flames. Daniel had extinguished the most number of flames was saved; the rest faced another challenge. In the second challenge, the three housemates had to hit life sized images of the other housemates, which were placed in the activity area, from the pool area. Vickie won the challenge, and was saved from the eviction; Jane and Manolo were the official two nominees.

On Day 106, Manolo was evicted after receiving the fewest votes.

=== Week 16 ===
The nominations for this week were based on the Do You Know game and was hosted by Judy Ann Santos-Agoncillo on Day 107. In the game, housemates were asked questions. Vickie and Maris won the first and second rounds, respectively, and were thus saved from the nomination. In the third round, only Vickie and Maris played the game. In that round, the winner will have a power to save a housemate from the eviction. Maris won the last round and chose to save Loisa. On the other hand, Daniel, Jane, and Joshua were listed as the official nominees for the week.

Award-winning director Cathy Garcia-Molina entered the Big Brother House on Day 108 to help the housemates on their weekly task. With her help, they are tasked to create a short movie as their weekly task. She gave them their script and also tasked them to know their character. She came back at the Big Brother House the next day, only to find out that the housemates did not do their assignment. Instead they only memorized their script. This led to Direk Cathy's walk-out from the house. On Day 110, Big Brother called Jane and Daniel in the confession room to tell them that Direk Cathy still didn't want to come back until she sees that they are worth working for. Because of that, the housemates practiced their lines all day. The next morning, Direk Cathy came back at the Big Brother House, and the housemates apologized to her for not making their homework. After that, they started to shoot for their weekly task. All housemates had trouble with shooting. Daniel had trouble with pronouncing Tagalog words and Loisa had trouble with her expressions and voice. Joshua had trouble with acting in front of Direk Cathy and Vickie had trouble with her lines. On Day 111, the housemates' short film premiered in television.

On Day 113, Joshua was evicted, having received the lowest ever net vote of -34.57% as a result of the S-E Voting scheme during the 12th Eviction Night.

=== Week 17 ===
The housemates had a task that involved a mini Big Brother house which was more or less able to accommodate the five remaining housemates. This house should be carried everywhere the housemates went together while inside it. Initially, Loisa was allowed to stay outside the house to prepare the others' food. However, she was also made to stay inside the house. In order for them to get outside of the house, they are supposed to go around the pool 100 times. At some point in between they were able to eat dinner with four previous Big Winners in the picnic area. The housemates also had a chance to meet their families.

On Day 115, Maris' parents exchanged their wedding vows inside the house. The marriage was solemnized by Quezon City Mayor Herbert Bautista. On Day 118, Aquino & Abunda Tonight aired live inside the living room of the Big Brother house. Individually, the five remaining housemates were interviewed by Kris Aquino, effectively occupying the time slots of the two shows. On Day 119, the housemates saw the Big Four platform in the living room. After Loisa was evicted, Maris, Daniel, Jane, and Vickie were declared as the Big 4. As a reward, the Big 4 went to the Manila Yacht Club, where they rode a yacht, ate dinner, and watched a fireworks display.

== Tasks ==
=== Weekly tasks ===
Every week, Big Brother will give the housemates a task which they had to accomplish. At stake per task is their weekly budget.

Task no.	Date given	Task title and description	Result
1	April 28, 2014 (Day 2)	Hating Kapatid; Part 1: The housemates have to divide their time among themselves equally in doing household chores, food, and shower time, among other activities. They are only allowed to commit five mistakes. A five-piece pie will be shown in the living room's LED monitor, wherein a piece of pie will be removed from the monitor for every mistake made.	Failed^{1}
1	April 28, 2014 (Day 2)	Part 2: Unknown to all other housemates, Big Brother instructed Fourth and Fifth to look for other housemates who, just like them, are also said to be siblings. This task comprises 50% of the entire weekly task. If they failed to discover which housemates are siblings, the entire group will receive no budget for their groceries in the following week.	Failed^{1}
2	May 4, 2014 (Day 8)	#SELFIEMATES; The housemates are tasked to take 3,000 selfies for the whole week. A roulette, which shall only be rotated when the prompt is made shall be spun to determine how many housemates should be included in a selfie. The housemates have 2 hours, 5 minutes, and 8 seconds every day for the task.	Passed^{2}
3	May 11, 2014 (Day 15)	Pinoy Big Brother All Ina; Part 1: The housemates were tasked to create a three-part webisode drama which will then be uploaded online. The online drama webisodes must gain one million views in order for the task to be considered a success.	Passed^{3}
3	May 11, 2014 (Day 15)	Part 2: Unknown to all other housemates, Big Brother instructed Maris, Chevin, and Loisa to will help the mothers of Manolo, Joshua, and Vickie in accomplishing their special secret tasks. If they fail in the task, the whole weekly task will be considered a failure. If they will accomplish this, Manolo, Joshua, and Vickie will be given a chance to meet and talk with their mothers.	Passed^{3}
4	May 19, 2014 (Day 23)	Pabigat nang Pabigat; Alex, Aina, Axel, Jane, Jacob, Loisa, Nichole and Vickie have to return to the weight prior to their entry to the Big Brother house. On Day 24, Big Brother implemented major changes to the weekly task. Due to Loisa and Nichole losing less weight among the eight housemates who gained weight, both of them will carry the outcome of the entire weekly task. Other housemates, on the other hand, will have to choose between the two girls who will they support and help. In the event that the housemate they chose will lose less weight, them and their chosen housemate will only be the individuals who will possibly be nominated next week. On Day 26, Big Brother informed the housemates that in order for them to win the weekly task, each of the eight housemates must lose 2% of their weight. The following are the housemates who chose to support Loisa or Nichole: Loisa: Fourth, Joshua, Aina, Axel, Jayme, Ranty, Alex (Won the task); Nichole: Manolo, Jacob, Vickie, Fifth, Jane, Michele, Daniel, Maris (Lost the task)	Passed
5	May 26, 2014 (Day 30)	Lapislide; Each team has to switch working hours to completely build a slide using towers built from 15,000 pencils. Each pencil had to be sharpened first using the big yellow sharpener provided by Big Brother before using them to construct the pencil towers. After constructing the slide, they need to roll a ball until it reaches the ring placed at the bottom end of the slide. The name of the challenge is a portmanteau of the Tagalog word lapis (English: pencil) and slide.	Failed^{4}
6	June 2, 2014 (Day 37)	Yes All We Can; Housemates must say yes to all the things asked to them, done to them, and to things they need to do as told by Big Brother. They will only be given three chances to say no. Yes (✔) or no (✘) tasks: Recipient(s) / Task / Decision; Jane, Loisa, Vickie / Undergo multiple tanning sessions? / ✔; Nichole / Eat silkworms for breakfast? / ✘; Fifth / Eat a frog for breakfast? / ✔; Maris / Eat silkworms for breakfast? / ✔; Jayme / Eat a frog for breakfast? / ✔; All housemates / Eat a silkworm? / ✔; Jayme / For a cause, pose as a nude model in a painting session? / ✘; Loisa, Joshua / Undergo a teeth extraction? / ✔; Fifth, Fourth / Have a drinking and bonding session? / ✔; All teens / Do you want Alex Gonzaga to be evicted from the House? / ✘; All adults / Do you want Alex Gonzaga to be evicted from the House? / ✘	Failed
7	June 9, 2014 (Day 44)	Domino Art Work; The housemates need to create a domino artwork that depicts the flag of the Philippines, and the word "Philippines". They may also add a famous local landmark to the artwork. At the end of the week, they should be able to fall the dominos from the living room to the bedrooms. They are given three chances to finish the task.	Failed
8	June 16, 2014 (Day 50)	Freeze; Housemates were tasked to stop when they hear the Tagalog word "tigil" (English: stop), and only allowed to move when they are told with the word "galaw" (English: move). They are only allowed to make three mistakes.	Failed
9	June 24, 2014 (Day 59)	Dancing Football; When the "Pinoy Ako" is played, the housemates were tasked to make a dance-football routine. By using a ball, it should be able not to touch the ground and should not touch it with their hands in the entire routine. They were given five tries to maintain the ball from touching the ground. Note that one mistake means they have to do the redo the entire routine from the start.	Failed
10	June 30, 2014 (Day 65)	That's My Baby; Each pair of housemates had to teach five preschoolers a Filipino action song created by the housemates. At the end of the week, the preschoolers should be able to perform it. They were only given an hour to give Big Brother a perferct performance.	Passed
11	July 7, 2014 (Day 72)	Twin or Lose; Being divided into two separate groups, one group must construct half of the house that is similar to the other group. One group cannot communicate with the other; except with the group leaders, the Pagotan twins. They were only allowed to construct the house in the activity area, which was divided by a tall and long barrier, preventing the two groups from seeing the plans and the works of the other.	Failed
12	July 15, 2014 (Day 80)	Card Attack; Jane had to master the art of throwing cards. At the end of the week, she has to use cards to hit, blow, or destroy certain targets using cards. He also had to pick two housemates to master the art; she picked Fifth and Joshua. To win the weekly task, the three of them had to hit 15 targets.	Failed
13	July 21, 2014 (Day 86)	The Big Concert; Part 1:The housemates had to make a big concert from 5 production numbers. Their performance will based on the decisions by the concert's assigned judges: Jason Gainza, Enchong Dee, and Erich Gonzales. If a judge does not like their performance, he will pull a curtain rope in order to partially conceal the stage. Once all the judges had pull their curtain ropes twice, their concert will be considered a failure.	Passed
13	July 21, 2014 (Day 86)	Part 2: Maris, together with some of the members of her family, had to make a special production number. This production number will be the sixth.	Passed
14	Date unknown	Dice Stacking; The housemates had to stack dices by placing four of it inside a paper cup and then shaking it. In the event that two housemates failed to do the task, the task will be considered a failure.	Passed
15	August 12, 2014 (Day 108)	Lights Camera Action! The housemates are tasked to shoot a Short Movie directed by Cathy Garcia-Molina. At the end of the week, the housemates must present their finished data in order to complete the weekly task.	Passed

Notes

1. The housemates passed the first part of the weekly task; however, due to Fourth and Fifth's failed attempt to guess who the other housemates are siblings—or more correctly, that there are no other siblings in the House, their entire weekly task was considered a failure.
2. Out of 6,770 selfies taken over five days, 3,527 were valid.
3. At the time of the cut-off, the three videos accumulated 1,400,305 views.
4. Initially, the housemates failed to complete the task, but was given by Big Brother a second chance to get the 50% of the weekly budget. They need to shoot a ball to the ring using the pencil towers they built; they were successful.

=== Other tasks ===
While in the house, Big Brother gives other tasks to one or more housemates, or to the houseguests. At stake per task is a special reward such as cash prizes.

Date given	Task recipient(s)	Task title and description	Rewards	Result
May 1, 2014 (Day 5)	Jayme, Fourth, and Ranty	Labor Day task Jayme, Fourth, and Ranty had to respectively pick one housemate and teach them some information and skills of their profession.	100 workers will receive free food	Passed^{1}
June 11, 2014 (Day 46)	Alex	Everytime the living room monitor flashes an acting scene, Alex needs to act it out in a big television frame with the help of the other housemates.	₱100,000 to chosen charity	Passed^{1}
July 2, 2014 (Day 67)	Daniel, Loisa, Manolo and Vickie	The four housemates had to bike for 2800 laps in order for Cheridel to see her son.	Cheridel will be able to see her son	Passed

Note

1. The result was not aired.

== Challenges ==
=== All Out ===
On Day 42, Big Brother announced the All Out twist. This twist involves challenges. At the end of all challenges, all the housemates that failed to win a challenge will receive an automatic nomination. The following are the All Out challenges:

Date given	Challenge recipient(s)	Challenge title and description	Safe from Eviction
June 9, 2014 (Day 44)	All housemates, except Loisa^{1}	The Island is Sinking; Three floating platforms are present in the pool. When Big Brother mentions how many housemates can stay in a platform, all the housemates part of the challenge will race towards them. The housemates that failed to get onto the platforms will not join the succeeding rounds. The last remaining housemate wins immunity.	Nichole
June 10, 2014 (Day 45)	Fifth, Fourth and Manolo; Loisa, Michele and Ranty; Jane, Jayme and Joshua; Daniel, Maris and Vickie	Vertical Longest Line; All housemates, except Alex and Nichole, need to group themselves into four groups of three; per group, one teen housemate should be present. All groups need to create a vertical line using things found in the house; this includes personal items they owned, and all the things present inside the house (with the exception of appliances and other fixtures). First, a member per group needs to collect all things they will need in creating the vertical line within 15 minutes. After that, each group will create the vertical line in the picnic area within four hours. A yellow flag should be placed at the top of each line, and each line should stand on its own. The group with the tallest line wins immunity.	Daniel, Maris and Vickie
June 11, 2014 (Day 46)	Fifth, Fourth and Manolo; Loisa, Michele and Ranty; Jane, Jayme and Joshua	All Out Ping Pong Challenge; Groups need to pass a pingpong ball to their groupmates while relaying the ball into an obstacle course of hoops and tubes. The group to finish the obstacle with the fastest time wins immunity.	Fifth, Fourth and Manolo

Note

1. In an advice by the show's medical team, Loisa was not included in the Matira Matibay challenge due to fever.

=== All In 10 ===
On the night of Day 69, it was announced that the housemates would face challenges. Teen housemates competed against the adult housemates for immunity from the eighth round of nominations. The housemates who finished the fastest won the challenge. Housemates earning three points won immunity from nomination.

Competition no.	Date given	Challenge description	Results									
Competition no.	Date given	Challenge description	Cheridel vs. Maris		Vickie vs. Loisa		Fourth vs. Manolo		Daniel vs. Joshua		Fifth vs. Jane	
1	Day 69 (July 4, 2014)	Being blindfolded and using only their hands, each housemate has to guess the items (rat, rambutan, feather duster, sago, and hand) placed inside each of five aquariums.	Won	Lost	Won	Lost	Won	Lost	Lost	Won	Won	Lost
2	Day 70 (July 5, 2014)	Housemates have to put pants on without using their hands, akin to the viral YouTube video of a man doing the same thing.	Lost	Won	Lost	Won	Won	Lost	Lost	Won	Won	Lost
3	Day 70 (July 5, 2014)	Housemates have to solve a puzzle, similar to the mobile game Unblock Me.	Lost	Won	Lost	Won	Lost	Won	Won	Lost	Won	Lost
4	Day 70 (July 5, 2014)	Housemates have to arrange glasses of water to form the tune of the chorus of the theme song Pinoy Ako. They are only given 30 minutes to finish the challenge. In the event that the time limit has been consumed, the housemate with more right number of glasses placed in their right positions will win the challenge.	Lost	Won	Won	Lost	Won	Lost	Lost	Won	No more challenges as Fifth was already saved from eviction	
5	Day 70 (July 5, 2014)	Housemates must find among several bags hanging inside the activity are the ones containing durian just by using their sense of smell. The one who will identify the correct bags the fastest will win the challenge.	No more challenges as Maris was already saved from eviction		Won	Lost	No more challenges as Fourth was already saved from eviction		No more challenges as Joshua was already saved from eviction		No more challenges as Fifth was already saved from eviction	
Points earned			1	3	3	2	3	1	1	3	3	0

=== Super challenges ===
On Day 79, it was announced that the housemates will face another set of immunity challenges. In three challenges, the group with the fastest time received immunity. The two groups were headed by Joshua and Fourth.

Competition no.	Date given	Challenge description	Representatives and results	
Competition no.	Date given	Challenge description	Team Fourth	Team Joshua
1	Day 79 (July 14, 2014)	Super Flexy; Representatives from each teams had to reach a key using flexible hands with magnets attached to them. When the flexible hands touch steel frames, they will receive a small electric shock. Note that they key should be retrieved as this will be useful in the next challenge.	Loisa (1 min. 3 sec.)	Maris (18 sec.)
2	Day 80 (July 15, 2014)	Super Agua; Representatives from each team had to swim down the pool to retrieve the right locked shell that contains a pin. They will be using the key from the previous challenge to open the correct shell; they will also be using a mermaid fintail in swimming.	Vickie (7 min. 40 sec.)	Jane (4 min. 35 sec.)
3	Day 80 (July 15, 2014)	Super Lipad; Representatives from each team had to pop balloons with the aid of the pins placed on their helmets while jumping from trampolines. Each had to get the letters "L-I-G-T-A-S" from the popped balloons to finish the challenge.	Fourth (53 sec.)	Joshua (2 min. 36 sec.)
Overall result			9 min. 46 sec	7 min. 29 sec.

=== Do You Know? ===
On Day 108, this challenge was given to the housemates for the 12th nomination round, it was hosted by Mrs. Judy Ann Santos-Agoncillo where the housemates were asked different questions about the other housemates. Each round will have a winner who will be immune from nomination and will participate in the final round where the winner will get a chance to save another housemate.

Round	Description	Safe from Eviction
1	The questions for this round was all about the ex-housemates.	Vickie
2	The questions for this round was all about the remaining housemates.	Maris
3	The questions for this round was about the two housemates who won the previous rounds.	Maris (Loisa)

== Nomination history ==
In every nomination, each housemate has to nominate two people with the first receiving two points and the second with one point. Nominations against Alex were not included in the tally since Alex was only a houseguest. For the first two nomination rounds, the public was given the chance to nominate one housemate. From Day 57 onwards, evictions were held every Sunday, a deviation from the usual Saturday. For the twelfth and thirteenth nomination rounds, the SE voting scheme was implemented. For the final night, overnight voting and Power of One were both implemented.

Pinoy Big Brother: All In nomination history
	#1	#2	#3	#4	All Out		All In Nominations	All In 10	Super challenges	Ligtask	Back to Back to Back Evictions			Do You Know?	#13	BIG NIGHT	Nominations received
	#1	#2	#3	#4	#5	#6	#7	#8	#9	#10	#11			#12	#13	BIG NIGHT	Nominations received
Eviction day & date	Day 21 May 17	Day 28 May 24	Day 35 May 31	Day 42 June 7	Day 56 June 21	Day 57 June 22	Day 64 June 29	Day 78 July 13	Day 85 July 20	Day 99 August 3	Day 106 August 10			Day 113 August 17	Day 119 August 23	Day 120 August 24	Nominations received
Nomination day & date	Day 15; May 11	Day 22; May 18	Day 29; May 25	Day 36; June 1	Day 51-52; June 16-17		Day 60; June 25	—	—	Day 93; July 28	Day 99; August 3	Day 100; August 4	—	—	Day 113; August 17	Day 119; August 23	Nominations received
Daniel	Not in the House	Exempt		Aina; Ranty	No nominations		Joshua; Jane	No nominations	No nominations	Vickie	Joshua; Loisa	Joshua	Exempt	No nominations	No nominations	Winner	15 (+1; -1)
Maris	Chevin; Jacob	Aina; Nichole	Jane; Jacob	~~Alex~~; Aina	No nominations		Daniel; Joshua	No nominations	No nominations	Loisa	Joshua; Manolo	Daniel	No nominations	No nominations	No nominations	Runner-up	19 (-1)
Jane	Aina; Michele	Jacob; Nichole	Jacob; Maris	Daniel; Nichole	No nominations		Loisa; Daniel	No nominations	No nominations	None	Manolo; Maris	Daniel	No nominations	No nominations	No nominations	3rd Place	40 (+5)
Vickie	Chevin; Maris	Michele; Nichole	Maris; Nichole	Ranty; Joshua	No nominations		Jane; Nichole	No nominations	No nominations	Loisa	Maris; Manolo	Maris	No nominations	No nominations	No nominations	4th Place	4 (+2; -1)
Loisa	Chevin; Cess	Nichole; Aina	Jane; Michele	Joshua; Jane	No nominations		Joshua; Jane	No nominations	No nominations	Maris	Daniel; Jane	Daniel	No nominations	No nominations	No nominations	Evicted (Day 119)	11 (+3; -3)
Joshua	Chevin; Ranty	Jacob; Fourth	Jacob; Vickie	Aina; Ranty	No nominations		Nichole; Loisa	No nominations	No nominations	Loisa	Manolo; Daniel	Daniel	No nominations	No nominations	Evicted (Day 113)		14 (+3)
Manolo	Aina; Maris	Aina; Loisa	Maris; Jane	Aina; Jane	No nominations		Jane; Loisa	No nominations	No nominations	Daniel	Loisa; Jane	Exempt		Evicted (Day 106)			10 (+3; -1)
Fifth	Chevin; Jacob	Michele; Jane	Jane; Jacob	Jane; Michele	No nominations		Daniel; Jane	No nominations	No nominations	Manolo	Evicted (Day 99)						2 (+2)
Fourth	Cess; Maris	Aina; Ranty	Jane; Nichole	Ranty; Aina	No nominations		Joshua; Jane	No nominations	No nominations	Evicted (Day 85)							3 (+1)
Cheridel	Not in the House				Exempt			No nominations	Evicted (Day 78)								0 (+1)
Nichole	Loisa; Chevin	Ranty; Jane	Maris; Jane	Ranty; Joshua	No nominations		Loisa; Fifth	Evicted (Day 64)									20
Michele	Maris; Chevin	Vickie; Jacob	Jane; Nichole	Ranty; Jane	No nominations		Evicted (Day 57)										12 (+1)
Jayme	Ranty; Jane	Michele; Ranty	Manolo; Maris	Ranty; Joshua	No nominations		Evicted (Day 57)										0 (+1)
Ranty	Chevin; Nichole	Fourth; Vickie	Jane; Jacob	Daniel; Fifth	No nominations	Evicted (Day 56)											24 (+1)
Alex	Houseguest				Exited (Day 49)												0 (+1)
Aina	Jane; Manolo	Jane; Jacob	Jane; Nichole	Ranty; Joshua	Evicted (Day 42)												19
Jacob	Chevin; Nichole	Ranty; Nichole	Nichole; Jane	Evicted (Day 35)													18
Axel	Maris; Nichole	Michele; Jacob	Evicted (Day 28)														1 (+1)
Cess	Chevin; Michele	Forced Eviction (Day 21)															3
Chevin	Jacob; Axel	Evicted (Day 21)															18
Notes	^{1}^{,} ^{2}	^{3}^{,} ^{4}^{,} ^{5}	All Out				^{6}^{,}^{7}	All In 10	Colored envelopes Super challenges	^{8}	^{9}	^{10}	^{11}	Do You Know?		^{12}	
Up for eviction	Chevin; Loisa; Maris	Aina; ~~Alex~~; Axel; Manolo; Michele	Jacob; Jane; Maris	Aina; Joshua; Ranty	Jane; Jayme; Joshua; Loisa; Michele; Ranty		Daniel; Fifth; Jane; Joshua; Loisa; Nichole	Cheridel; Daniel; Jane; Loisa; Manolo	Fifth; Fourth; Loisa; Vickie	Fifth; Jane; Joshua; Manolo	Manolo	Daniel	Jane; Vickie	Daniel; Jane; Joshua	Open Voting		
Insta Save	Not yet implemented			Joshua	none		Jane	none			Daniel; Vickie			none			
Saved from eviction	Loisa; 39.37% Maris; 30.38%	Manolo; 33.87% Michele; 23.68% Aina; 23.03%	Maris; 53.19% Jane; 30.21%	Ranty; 67.53%	Jane; 45.40% Loisa; 20.24% Joshua; 11.29%		Loisa; 34.27% Joshua; 20.33% Fifth; 16.51% Daniel; 16.27%	Jane; 49.44% Loisa; 31.59% Daniel; 13.46% Manolo; 4.27%	Loisa; 43.58% Vickie; 22.96% Fifth; 17.84%	Jane; 42.11% Joshua; 23.80% Manolo; 17.56%	Jane; 68.84%			Jane; 24.75% Daniel; 9.82%	Jane; 27.06% Daniel; 11.91% Maris; 8.18% Vickie; 1.09%	Daniel; 11.69%	
Evicted	Chevin; 30.24% to save	Axel; 19.42% to save	Jacob; 16.59% to save	Aina; 32.47% to save	Ranty; 5.18% to save	Michele; 9.47% to save Jayme; 8.43% to save	Nichole; 12.61% to save	Cheridel; 1.23% to save	Fourth; 15.62% to save	Fifth; 16.53% to save	Manolo; 31.16% to save			Joshua -34.57%	Loisa; 0.99%	Maris; 3.10% Jane -0.73% Vickie -0.78%	
Forced Eviction	Cess	none														Maris; 3.10% Jane -0.73% Vickie -0.78%	
References																	

Legend

Italicized name Housemate was nominated through public voting
Housemate received an automatic nomination
Received immunity after winning/finishing a task
Exempted from the nominations/challenge, but not immune from the evictions

Notes

1. Loisa and Chevin topped the public poll earning 25.08% and 22.76% of public votes, respectively. With Chevin already topping the nominations inside the house, his result in the public nomination was disregarded, leaving Loisa as only the housemate nominated by the public.
2. Cess was forcibly evicted for several reasons: for asking Manolo's mother and Sandara Park events happening on the outside world, moving furnitures, whispering, secretly writing messages, and for not wearing her lapel.
3. Alex, Axel and Manolo were given automatic nominations for asking events in the outside world. Since Alex was a secretly a Houseguest, she could not be evicted, and was nominated under the Housemate's pretense.
4. Aina topped the public poll earning 50.25% of the public vote.
5. Daniel entered the house on Day 21. As a new housemate, he was not allowed to nominate or to be nominated.
6. This week featured All In nominations, wherein all housemates who received votes were up for nomination.
7. On Day 69, Cheridel became an official housemate.
8. All housemates were automatically nominated. However, they can save others by nominating them for immunity or not to vote any at all. Those housemates who did not receive any votes for immunity will be automatically nominated. Fifth failed to save Manolo in the challenge adding the latter to the official list of nominees.
9. Several nominees were given a fake eviction. After the list of nominees were determined, they undergone a challenge wherein one of them was instantly saved and returned to the house. The remaining were up for eviction. In the first fake eviction, the housemates nominated face to face. Only the top vote-getter was given a fake eviction.
10. In the second fake eviction, it was required that they need to vote who they wanted to evict as group. The said evictee should receive at least 4 votes. During the nomination process, the group had undergone four nomination tries before reaching the majority vote. Manolo was exempted from the nominations since he was already given a fake eviction. The reflected votes in the table are the final votes; the previous votes were disregarded.
11. The third fake eviction was based on an obstacle course challenge. The two housemates who got the longest time to finish the challenge received fake evictions. Manolo and Daniel were exempted from the nominations since they were already given fake evictions.
12. Big Brother implemented the Power of One rule.

=== Vote to Nominate ===
For the first two nomination rounds, the public was given the chance to nominate one housemate. Below is the breakdown of vote percentages released by the show.

Nomination no.	#1^{1}	#2^{2}
Saved from Public Nomination	Housemate C 17.64% Housemate D 14.58% Housemate E 5.53% Housemate F 3.75% Housemate G 3.26% Housemate H 1.90% Housemate I 0.99% Housemate J 0.99% Housemate K 0.94% Housemate L 0.76% Housemate M 0.56% Housemate N 0.42% Housemate O 0.34% Housemate P 0.27% Housemate Q 0.22%	Loisa; 18.40% Michele; 10.31% Maris; 5.48% Nichole; 3.66% Joshua; 2.82% Ranty; 2.66% Jane; 2.31% Jacob; 2.11% Vickie; 0.77% Jayme; 0.44% Fourth; 0.43% Fifth; 0.36%
Nominated by the Public	Loisa; 25.08% ~~Chevin~~; 22.76%	Aina; 50.25%

Notes

1. The system implied that the two housemates who garnered the highest votes will be nominated for eviction, Loisa and Chevin topped the BBN. However Chevin garnered the highest votes in the nomination of the housemates.
2. With Axel and Manolo having automatically nominated, it was revealed that only the housemate with the most votes from the BBN will be nominated for eviction.

=== Colored envelopes ===
Big Brother vested a power on an evicted housemate to nominate and save another housemate for the next nomination round.

Eviction No.	Evicted Housemate	Envelope	
Eviction No.	Evicted Housemate	Red	Black
8	Cheridel	Manolo	Fifth
8	~~Daniel~~	~~Vickie~~	~~Cheridel~~
8	~~Manolo~~	~~Fifth~~	~~Jane~~

Notes

- Although Jane and Loisa were also nominated at that week, the power was given after they were saved in the first part of eviction weekend.
- In the event that Daniel was fake evicted, he would have given his red and black envelopes to Vickie and Cheridel, respectively.
- In the event that Manolo was fake evicted, he would have given his red and black envelopes to Fifth and Jane, respectively.

=== S–E voting system result ===
Below is the eviction voting result implemented from the twelfth eviction round up to the big night.

Eviction No.	Nominated Housemate	Votes			Result
Eviction No.	Nominated Housemate	To-Save	To-Evict	Net	Result
12	Daniel	27.41%	-17.59%	9.82%	Saved
12	Jane	58.61%	-33.86%	24.75%	Saved
12	Joshua	13.98%	-48.55%	-34.57%	Evicted
13	Daniel	12.60%	-0.69%	11.91%	Finalist
13	Jane	32.68%	-5.62%	27.06%	Finalist
13	Loisa	14.27%	-13.28%	0.99%	Evicted
13	Maris	10.93%	-2.75%	8.18%	Finalist
13	Vickie	4.13%	-3.04%	1.09%	Finalist

== Finale: The Big Night at Resorts World ==
Prior to the Big Night, all votes were reset back to zero and the SE voting system will be implemented with the Power of One rule. In the morning of Day 120 (August 24, 2014), the Big 4 exited the house and rode in a helicopter to the Villamor Air Base in Pasay. After that, they rode a limousine to Resorts World Manila and were tasked to open a vault. After unlocking the vault, they found a cellphone; they called Big Brother, who told them that the Big Night was happening that night.

At the Big Night in Resorts World Manila, Big Brother gave them his final message. Afterwards, each of the Big 4 was able to ask questions to a housemate. After the end of the public poll, Vickie Rushton was proclaimed the 4th Big Placer with -0.78% of the total net votes. Jane Oineza then managed to obtain -0.73% of the total net votes and was proclaimed the 3rd Big Placer. Maris was declared as the season's 2nd Big Placer with 3.10% of the total net votes while Daniel was proclaimed this season's Big Winner with 11.69% of the total net votes and the third celebrity winner of this franchise.

Day 120: Big Winner Vote
Housemate		Votes			Result
Housemate		To-Save	To-Evict	Net	Result
K	Jane	19.93%	-20.66%	-0.73%	3rd Place
U	Daniel	18.52%	-6.83%	11.69%	Winner
Y	Maris	13.62%	-10.52%	3.10%	Runner-up
A	Vickie	4.57%	-5.35%	-0.78%	4th Place

== Notes ==
Preceded by Teen Edition 4	Pinoy Big Brother: All In (April 27, 2014–August 24, 2014)	Succeeded by 737
