= The Rise at Monterrazas =

General information
- Location: Monterrazas de Cebu, Brgy. Guadalupe, Cebu City, Philippines
- Coordinates: 10°19′27.6″N 123°52′13.0″E
- Groundbreaking: November 2024
- Estimated completion: 2030

Technical details
- Floor count: 19

Design and construction
- Architecture firm: LLG Architects Design Studio
- Developer: The Mont Property Group
- Engineer: Slater Young
- Structural engineer: R.B Sanchez Consulting Engineers

Other information
- Number of units: 146 villas
- Parking: 399 slots

Website
- theriseatmonterrazas.com

The Rise at Monterrazas is a 19-storey residential condominium under-construction in Cebu City. It is part of the Monterrazas de Cebu development.

== History ==
The Rise at Monterrazas is one of the planned features within the Monterrazas de Cebu, a 200-hectare (490-acre) mountainside development covering the barangays of Guadalupe, Sapangdaku, Buhisan, and Tisa in Cebu City. It was developed by Genvi Development Corporation until its acquisition by 8990 Holdings Development Corporation in 2019. Prior to this, the development of the whole Monterrazas de Cebu was halted by cease and desist order in 2008 and 2011 following flash floods and mudslides by then-Cebu City mayors Tomas Osmeña and Michael Rama respectively. Filipino engineer and online creator Slater Young was identified as an industry partner.

The plan to build The Rise in Guadalupe was first announced on August 24, 2023 by Young. The Rise was met with opposition and concerns of flooding from environmental groups with the building's scale model appearing to cover a whole mountainside. The concern was rooted to flooding caused by Typhoon Rai in 2021.

The project was reportedly delayed to address the concerns. Groundbreaking took place around November 2024.

Renewed interest and concern rose again after Cebu City experienced flooding after the onslaught of Typhoon Kalmaegi (Tino) in November 2025. This prompted an investigation by the Department of Environment and Natural Resources, Department of Public Works and Highways and the Independent Commission for Infrastructure.

== Architecture and design ==
The Rise at Monterrazas was designed by LLG Architects Design Studio with Leizle Go and Patrick Lendel Go as the principal architects in collaboration with engineer Slater Young. Young said that the residential development was inspired from the Banaue Rice Terraces with the structure to "conform" rather than built against the natural terrain. The plan was develop amidst the COVID-19 pandemic. The Rise at Monterrazas is a 19-storey condominium with the structure sitting backwards on the mountainside with 146 units. Responding to the initial environmental concerns in 2023, Young said that the project underwent 300 revisions.

Nevertheless, the team enrolled the project to the BERDE of the Philippine Green Building Council (PHILGBC) and consulted with the United Architects of the Philippines to address the environmental concerns.

The Rise at Monterrazas was given the jury award in the Unbuilt – Multi-Unit Housing (L >10 Floors) category at the 12th Architizer A+ Awards in 2024.

Joshua Agar, a wind engineer and assistant professor at the UP Institute of Civil Engineering said the design as presented in August 2023 will cause topographic amplification or wind exerted on The Rise will be fourfold compared to conventional design.
