= Pinoy Big Brother: Unlimited =

Coordinates: 14°38′20″N 121°02′05″E

- Season 4
- Presented by: Toni Gonzaga; Bianca Gonzalez; Robi Domingo
- No. of days: 155
- No. of housemates: 37
- Winner: Slater Young
- Runner-up: Pamu Pamorada

Release
- Original network: ABS-CBN
- Original release: October 29, 2011 – March 31, 2012

Season chronology
- ← Previous; Double Up Next → All In

The fourth season of the reality game show Pinoy Big Brother, subtitled Unlimited aired on ABS-CBN for 155 days from October 29, 2011, to March 31, 2012. This was the last and separate civilian season to air after the three editions were merged into one season, starting from All In. This season is currently the longest civilian season to date and broke the previous civilian season's record for the longest duration by three more weeks and also ranked as one of the show's longest seasons worldwide as of that time, only surpassed by a number of seasons held in Germany, until this season's duration was later beaten by Lucky 7 on 2016 and later on Otso which currently holds the record, with 268 days.

It is the only regular season with a male winner: Slater Young. Pamu Pamorada was the runner-up, while Joseph Biggel, and Paco Evangelista were the finalists.

== Overview ==
=== Auditions ===
Auditions for the season started in Metro Manila on March 4, 2011, at the SM Mall of Asia where around 10,000 people attended. Show director Lauren Dyogi said the turnout at the Mall of Asia audition was the largest in the show's history. Other auditions were held at several key cities in the Philippines from March to July 2011, plus overseas auditions in Tokyo and Los Angeles. The total number of aspirants for the season, as claimed by the show, was 30,789. A total of 37 housemates entered for this season; fourteen on opening night, fifteen on Day 8, six on Day 15, and two on Days 23 and 25.

=== Primers & shows ===
In the run-up to the premiere, a special weekday afternoon primer entitled Pinoy Big Brother: The Audition Stories started airing on October 24, 2011. It featured several participants whose audition stories caught the interest of the producers. The afternoon primer lasted until November 4, 2011. It eventually gave way to the new show, Pinoy Big Brother: UnliDay, the day main program. The said program shows the latest happenings of the Day Housemates from the Industrial House.

=== Hosts ===
Toni Gonzaga and Bianca Gonzalez reprised their hosting stints for the show, together with Teen Edition Plus runner-up Robi Domingo.

=== House theme ===
For the season, the exterior of the House was slightly tweaked to have slotted walls and minor modifications, but still keeping the yellow and blue color scheme. There are five areas for this season: four Houses and a special area. Two of the houses, the Industrial and Luxury Houses, are connected via a secret hallway first revealed on Day 22 and fully opened on Day 65.

- Slums: First occupied on opening night, the Slums was made to look like a typical squatters' area in many urban areas in the Philippines. This was done to let the housemates experience the same living conditions as 15 million Filipinos who live in such areas, based from a typical answer during auditions of experiencing typical Filipino life. This House was demolished on Day 22.
- Industrial House: The interior of the second House follows the regular House layout and its accompanying amenities. It is further given an "industrial" feel with steel, wooden, and brick walls. Unlike previous seasons, however, this House has no yard area. The house was opened on Day 8 and was closed down on Day 77.
- Luxury House: Also called the Mansion, the third House is exquisitely furnished and brightly lit. Like the Industrial House, this House also has no yard area, although sunlight somehow passes through a curtain. This house was opened on Day 22.
- Resort: Located adjacent to the Luxury House, this area is sophisticated with the inclusion of the pool and a Jacuzzi in the beach-themed Garden area. It is used as a venue for special occasions and tasks. This area was opened on Day 15 and the door to the resort (hidden under a curtain in the Luxury House) was opened on Day 65.
- Hacienda: Located at the activity area, the Hacienda is modelled after a typical plantation in the Philippines by featuring several plants. It contains a large hut where the housemates would live in. This House was opened on Day 128.

=== Unlimited twists ===
- Reserved housemates — short-listed auditionees are given another chance to become official housemates.
- Unli-Day/Unli-Night —The show features two houses, each containing a different set of housemates. To accommodate both, a second main program, Unli-Day, was aired in the afternoons to focus on the events in the Industrial House. The setup only applies to weekdays; on weekends, nomination and eviction nights, and special shows, the primetime program would cover both Houses. With the closure of the Industrial House on Week 11, Unli-Day was directed towards covering events in the active House(s) while the host has an interview session with former housemates.
- House Swaps — Housemates will be made to swap houses and group members as instructed by Big Brother.
- SE Voting System — The public votes to save or evict a housemate. The housemate with the lowest net votes, Save and Evict votes combined, is evicted. This voting system was stopped after the fourth eviction round.
- Head of Household — Housemates compete against each other to be granted immunity in the coming nomination.
- House Competitions — For ten weeks, the two Houses compete in weekly major competitions with PHP150,000 at stake in each. At the end of those ten weeks, the cash accumulated by each team would be shared among the final five housemates in each House. The teams would also compete in "mini-battles" wherein the winning team would be given minor rewards.
- Intensity 7 — On Day 71, the remaining 20 housemates, 11 from Team High-Voltage and nine from Team Wayuk, were put-up for 24-hour public voting. The top five housemates from each team will be safe from elimination on Day 78, where six housemates will be evicted from the house. A sequel twist, called the Aftershock, would test the remaining housemates further.
- Various Nominations – Various nomination processes were implemented as per Big Brother. See Nomination history for details.
- Overnight Voting - In some eviction nights, people will only be given 24 hours to vote for their favorite housemate.
- House Players - An evicted housemate will remain in the house to test the remaining official housemates through tasks set by Big Brother and the audience.
- Wildcard Housemate - An evicted housemate will have a chance to come back on the roster of housemates.
- Power of One - Starting the 13th eviction, the public may only vote once per day per mobile phone number.
- Big Shot for the Big Slot - The final five housemates are given the chance to have a fifth slot in the finale by completing a shooting task.

== Housemates ==
A total of fourteen housemates entered the House on Day 1, thirteen official housemates plus a sub-official housemate acting as a "mole" in a task to become the fourteenth official housemate. That sub-official housemate was chosen by lottery from a pool of 30 reserved housemates. These are the auditionees who were shortlisted for the show, but did not make the official cut.

All thirteen official housemates plus the sub-official "mole" housemate, chosen via random sampling, entered the House on Day 1 (October 29, 2011). A second batch of housemates entered the House on Day 8, although those assigned to the Industrial House were not physically inside until the next day. Eight reserved housemates entered on Days 15, 23 and 25. The ages indicated were the housemates' ages upon their entrance to the House.

A grand total of 37 housemates—the third most number of housemates in the Philippine franchise behind Otso season's 58 housemates and Kumunity 10's 46 housemates.

Name	Age on entry	Hometown	Entered	Exited	Result
Slater Young	23	Cebu City	Day 1	Day 155	Winner
Pamu Pamorada	19	Lipa	Day 1	Day 155	Runner-up
Joseph Biggel	19	Marinduque	Day 1	Day 155	3rd Place
Paco Evangelista	26	General Santos	Day 141	Day 155	4th Place
Paco Evangelista	26	General Santos	Day 1	Day 106	Evicted
Divine Maitland-Smith	20	Cebu City	Day 1	Day 152	Evicted
Tin Patrimonio	19	Cainta	Day 1	Day 148	Evicted
Carlo Romero	25	Chicago, U.S.	Day 1	Day 141	Evicted
Kevin Fowler	18	California, U.S.	Day 1	Day 134	Evicted
Seichang Ushimi	22	Tokyo, Japan	Day 1	Day 127	Evicted
Deniesse Joaquin	20	Nueva Ecija	Day 15	Day 120	Evicted
Eting Busarang	27	Cebu	Day 8	Day 113	Evicted
Wendy Tabusalla	22	Muntinlupa	Day 8	Day 99	Evicted
Jessica Connelly	19	Taguig	Day 8	Day 93	Forced eviction
Joya Genzola	24	Negros Occidental	Day 8	Day 92	Evicted
Naprey Almario	23	Davao City	Day 8	Day 78	Evicted
Unad Hernandez	24	Batangas	Day 8	Day 78	Evicted
Roy Gamboa	29	Pangasinan	Day 1	Day 78	Evicted
Ryan Tomas	19	Colorado, U.S.	Day 23	Day 78	Evicted
Jerico Redrico	24	Pampanga	Day 8	Day 78	Evicted
Steph Enage	23	Baybay	Day 8	Day 78	Evicted
Kim de Guzman	19	Olongapo	Day 1	Day 71	Forced eviction
Kigoy Abarico	32	Ormoc	Day 1	Day 71	Evicted
Anatoly "Tol" Chua	33	Surigao del Sur	Day 8	Day 71	Evicted
Luz McClinton	33	Muntinlupa	Day 1	Day 71	Evicted
Seth Cox	32	California, U.S.	Day 25	Day 50	Evicted
Erica Arlante	31	Bacolod	Day 8	Day 50	Evicted
Mark Luz	23	Quezon City	Day 8	Day 43	Forced eviction
Lyn Bagiosa	25	Surigao del Norte	Day 8	Day 43	Voluntary exit
Casey Ann Austria	19	Albay	Day 8	Day 36	Evicted
Reg Pineda	19	Quezon City	Day 15	Day 36	Forced eviction
Jaz Manabat	24	Quezon City	Day 1	Day 31	Voluntary exit
Diane Aquino	28	Quezon City	Day 8	Day 29	Evicted
Lordwin Claveria	23	Quezon	Day 8	Day 29	Evicted
Cindy Miranda	20	Nueva Ecija	Day 15	Day 22	Evicted
Rhea Lim	26	Pampanga	Day 15	Day 22	Evicted
RJ Padilla	22	Parañaque	Day 15	Day 21	Forced eviction
Kulas Alon	26	La Union	Day 15	Day 20	Evicted

=== Houseguests ===
Similar to the franchise's previous seasons, Big Brother invited guests to his house for special purposes.

Notable houseguests for this season were ex-housemates from previous seasons such as Melai Cantiveros, Jason Francisco, Anthony Semerad and David Semerad. Franzen Fajardo, Baron Geisler, Beauty Gonzalez, Rica Paras returned as house players. Previous winners, Nene Tamayo, Beatriz Saw, and Keanna Reeves, who became Fairy Godmothers.

== House Competitions (Kontra Battles) ==
On Day 30, Big Brother announced the start of House Competitions, where the two Houses will compete for ten weeks for P150,000 at stake every week. The accumulated pot money for each House will be divided among the remaining housemates of each House after ten weeks. Group immunity from nomination was also put at stake with the seventh and eighth challenges.

The Luxury House residents are known as Team High Voltage and the Industrial House denizens are codenamed Team Wayuk.

Battle No.	Date of performance	Description	Winner
1	November 29, 2011 (Day 32)	Jump Rope Exhibition; The two Houses are tasked to make a three-minute jump rope choreography and exhibition.	Team; High Voltage
2	December 9, 2011 (Day 42)	Human Belen; The Houses are to pose like that of the Nativity scene for ten hours.	Team; Wayuk
3	December 16, 2011 (Day 49)	Original Christmas Song; Part of the Christmachine challenge, the battle would involve the housemates creating an original Christmas song and make a music video as well. Noted experts in the Philippine music industry will judge the songs' merits.	Team; High Voltage
4	December 23, 2011 (Day 56)	Give Big Love; Part of the concert challenge, the winning would be determined by the quality of the housemates' production numbers, as judged by noted experts in the Philippine entertainment industry.	Team; Wayuk
5	December 30, 2011 (Day 63)	Big Ballroom Battle; Both teams will face off through a chacha, samba, and an Argentine tango routine. Two pairs will work on samba and another two for chacha while a lone pair tackles the tango.	Team; High Voltage
6	January 5, 2012 (Day 69)	Shields; Both teams will lob water balloons over a high wall using improvised weapons to knock down two small banners and one large banner. Six housemates would serve as the shooters while four others will use improvised shields. One housemate from each team serves as the spotter.	Team; High Voltage
7	January 19, 2012 (Day 83)	SOCOB (Scene of the Crime Operatives sa Bahay ni Kuya); Both teams would investigate a mock murder case and apply various criminal investigation procedures to crack the case first. The winning team would be exempted from the next nomination round. The name is a play on the ABS-CBN crime investigative show S.O.C.O..	Team; Wayuk
8	Week 13	Rat-A-Huli; Both teams are assigned to build various mousetraps to capture as many rats as possible, with two housemates from each team standing guard over their traps. The team who caught the most rats will again receive the cash pot plus nomination immunity. The name of the challenge is a portmanteau of Ratatouille and the Tagalog word huli (catch).	None
9	Week 15	Double Trouble; One housemate from both teams will be assigned to secretly investigate guest housemates Antonik and Imerich Novak (Anthony and David Semerad) and uncover three mysteries (their Filipino heritage, their capability to speak English/Tagalog, and the pot money the two hid in their belongings). The housemate cannot ask any teammates for help nor use Big Brother's name as a reason in case they are caught. The twin brothers will win the pot money if their cover is not blown by the time they leave the House.	Team; Wayuk
10	February 10, 2012 (Day 105)	Triple Dribble; The twins will coach both teams in a series of basketball-related games.	Team; High Voltage

== Weekly tasks ==
Below is the list of weekly tasks performed by the housemates. Each of the tasks below are "all-or-nothing" tasks; failure would mean no budget for the next week. There are separate weekly tasks for each House.

The first weekly task was done by the first batch of housemates in the Slums.

Teams High Voltage and Team Wayuk were formed on Day 30. Weekly tasks prior to Day 30 were done by the same sets of housemates, with the exception of the very first weekly task. On Day 22, Jaz and Seichang transferred to the Luxury House and joined in doing Team High Voltage's extended 3rd weekly task. On Day 31, Luz and Seichang transferred to the Industrial House and became part of Team Wayuk.

Starting Day 71, the members of Teams High-Voltage and Wayuk who were drafted into the top 14 were made to do their weekly task as one group.

=== Wayuk ===
Task No.	Date given	Description	Result
1	November 7, 2011 (Day 10)	Origami; Each housemate must learn 20 different origami designs without looking back at their instruction booklet. At the end of the week, Big Brother will then test their memories and for them to win they must make 17 out of 20 origami designs correctly.	Passed
2	November 14, 2011 (Day 17)	Tower of Cards; The housemates must build a stable tower of playing cards as high as their tallest housemate, Seichang.	Failed
3	November 20, 2011 (Day 23)	Pop and Lock; The housemates would be taught how to do the Pop and Lock dance with a dance instructor teaching them for the entire week. They would then make a video of them doing the dance which would be posted on the show's Facebook page. The video must accumulate 14,000 "Likes" before the end of the week to deem the task a success.^{T5}	Passed
4	November 28, 2011 (Day 30)	Dedmahan; The housemates were tasked to ignore at least half of 14 distractions that could appear inside the house all week long. The name of the task is a play on the Tagalog slang word dedma (to feign ignorance of any object/person's existence).	Passed
5	December 5, 2011 (Day 38)	Oplan Pinoy; Unad, Kim, and Steph would be respectively assigned to teach and quiz Seichang, Kevin, and Ryan about various aspects of Filipino culture. The object is to make them learn more about their Filipino heritage.	Passed
6	December 11, 2011 (Day 44)	Christmachine; The housemates were tasked to hold all-night caroling sessions from December 14 to 16 by singing eight Christmas songs, including one original composition. The public will be encouraged to request the housemates to sing any of the eight songs for charity at PHP100 a request. The goal is to earn PHP10,000.	Passed^{T4}
7	December 18, 2011 (Day 51)	Give Big Love; The housemates were tasked to organize a live concert with seven production numbers, and also feature a loved one. The proceeds from the sale of the tickets (at PHP10,000 each) will go to the survivors of tropical storm Sendong.	Passed
8	December 26, 2011 (Day 59)	Think Positive (YES!); The housemates were tasked to accept all of Big Brother's tasks, even if they dislike them. They can only say "No" a maximum of three times for the entire week.	Passed
9	January 3, 2012 (Day 67)	Doctor Housemates; The housemates would be taught various first-aid techniques and Big Brother will test their knowledge through a series of mock emergencies. Steph, a registered nurse, will be their mentor.	Passed

=== High Voltage ===
Task No.	Date given	Description	Result
1	November 6, 2011 (Day 09)	The Secret; As a secret task, Casey was given a rock as an heirloom to which she should perform a dance ritual. She should initially do this alone while everyone was asleep; eventually she must convince five of her fellow housemates (two from her batch and three among the original batch) to do the same.	Passed
2	November 15, 2011 (Day 18)	Fish Be With You; The housemates were assigned to fly a remote-controlled fish-shaped balloon they named "Fifi" around the slums for one week. They must not touch the fish, nor let any part of it settle to the ground. Each housemate must take turns at the remote control. ^{T2}	Failed
3	November 28, 2011 (Day 30)	Walang Pansinan (English approx. Don't React); The housemates would try to go on about their daily routine in spite of 14 distractions that come into the House. They can look at the distraction and must not show visible reactions, but can freely talk about them when the threat has passed.	Passed^{T3}
4	December 5, 2011 (Day 38)	PROJECT: Kigoy; Joya, Roy, Carlo, Jerico and Eting were tasked to help Kigoy reform his ways.	Passed
5	December 11, 2011 (Day 44)	Christmachine; The housemates were tasked to hold all-night caroling sessions from December 14 to 16 by singing seven pre-selected Christmas songs plus one original composition. The public will be encouraged to request the housemates to sing any of the eight songs for charity at PHP100 a request. The goal is to earn PHP10,000.	Passed^{T4}
6	December 18, 2011 (Day 51)	Give Big Love; The housemates were tasked to organize a live concert with seven production numbers, and also feature a loved one. The proceeds from the sale of the tickets (at PHP10,000 each) will go to the survivors of tropical storm Sendong.	Failed
7	December 26, 2011 (Day 59)	Patibayan; The housemates will be subjected to tasks that will test their attitudes and pleasantry. The name of the task is based on the Tagalog word tibay (strength or willpower)	Passed
8	January 2, 2012 (Day 66)	Happy News Year; The housemates would produce a news program with some of them serving as the reporters. They will be judged for their news content, delivery of the news, and their poise and composure.	Passed

=== Joint Team (Wayuk & High Voltage) ===
Task No.	Date given	Description	Result
1	October 30, 2011 (Day 02)	Sa Hirap o Ginhawa (Through Thick and Thin); The housemates must win five out of seven challenges given by Big Brother. If they fail, six of the current housemates will be leaving the house.: Sa Hirap o Ginhawa challenge / Result; Junk Art Challenge / Passed; Videoke with-a-twist Challenge / Passed; Kiskis Challenge / Passed; Behind Basketball Shot Challenge / Failed; 24-hour Pamaypay Challenge / Failed^{T1}; Nail of Art Challenge / Passed; Bike Balancing Challenge / Failed	Failed^{T1}
2	January 9, 2012 (Day 72)	Unlubogable; The housemates would assemble various contraptions designed to take them the length of the Resort pool. Four out of six contraptions must take housemates over the water for the task to be declared a success. The name of the task is a play on the Tagalog word lubog (sink).^{T6}	Passed
3	January 19, 2012 (Day 83)	Personalized Hot Wheels; The housemates would build two simple nerd machines where a ball would pass, patterned and inspired after the Great Wall of China. The ball would have to successfully pass through the machines at Big Brother's signal - within 20 seconds for one machine and 12 seconds for the other.	Failed
4	January 24, 2012 (Day 88)	Unrelieved Names; The nominees will be tasked to memorize all the Chinese names of the housemates. They are paired to answer and do the tasks given by Big Brother.	Passed ^{T7}
5	January 30, 2012 (Day 94)	Larawan sa Dilim (English approx Picture in the Darkness); The housemates will make a shadow play based on some life sketches they made.	Passed
6	February 8, 2012 (Day 102)	Great Marinduque Adventure; Two pairs of housemates - Divine and Paco, and Biggel and Slater - will go to Marinduque and do tasks on the island without being recognized by anybody. Success would mean two weeks' budget; failure would result in no two-week budget and automatic nomination.	Passed^{T8}
7	February 24, 2012 (Day 119)	I Am The Big Winner; Each housemate would be challenged to sit in a special throne reserved for the Big Winner. The task will be declared a success if at least six people can sit on the throne for at least 30 minutes each.	Failed^{T9}
8	February 26, 2012 (Day 121)	M6; The housemates must fend off the M6 House Players from distracting them as they do a number of tasks.	Failed
9	March 5, 2012 (Day 129)	Don-Donya; The housemates will do certain tasks as plantation workers under Baron and Beauty.	Failed
10	March 11, 2012 (Day 135)	Fairy Godmothers; The housemates will do certain tasks resembling challenges from previous seasons. Success in all challenges would mean each housemate being granted three wishes, plus a special reward.	Passed
11	March 16, 2012 (Day 140)	Unligayang Tanghalan; The housemates will have to do a 48-hour variety show. No single housemate can perform in two straight segments and each segment must have at least two housemates performing. No two segments should be the same (i.e. two game shows with the very same mechanics). It is also the last task of the season.	Passed

Legend:
Weekly task was performed in the slums
Weekly task was performed in the industrial house
Weekly task was performed in the luxury house
Weekly task was performed in the outside world
Weekly task was performed in the hacienda

Notes:

- ^T1 : Reserve housemate Carlo lost the 4th task on purpose as part of his secret task as a mole.
- ^T2 : This task was extended to the Luxury House after the fish flew away from the Slums during its first hour, hence, becoming the team's weekly task for two weeks. Big Brother declared the task a failure because Fifi's tailfin touched the floor frequently.
- ^T3 : Big Brother declared the task a success because the Luxury housemates ignored nine of 14 distractions.
- ^T4 : The Luxury and Industrial housemates earned PHP71,500 and PHP48,600, respectively, for charity which resulted a success for both their weekly tasks.
- ^T5 : By the time accumulation was halted at around 9:30 pm on Day 30, 20,959 "Likes" were posted. The target of 14,000 "Likes" was already reached at around the afternoon of Day 29.
- ^T6 : Five of the six contraptions were successful - two from Team High Voltage and three from Team Wayuk.
- ^T7 : The success was assured after the nominees of the week got 20 out of 20 answers correct in a challenge to match each housemate's picture with the proper Chinese characters in the right sequence.
- ^T8 : The task was declared a partial success because the housemates were recognized during the trip at some point.
- ^T9 : The task was declared a failure because only one housemate (Paco) sat on the throne.

== Head of Household Competitions ==
Housemates from each houses will compete against each other, and the winner/s of the competition will be each house's HOH for week. The HOH will be granted immunity in the coming nomination.

Task No.	Date given	Description	Head/s of Household
1	November 21, 2011 (Day 24)	Gender Wars; In the Industrial house, the men will face the female housemates through a series of challenges all week long.	Erica, Jessica, Kim, Lyn, Paco, Pamu, Steph
1	November 28, 2011 (Day 31)	Fish Be With You; In the Luxury House, each housemate had to maneuver a remote-controlled fish balloon named "Fifi" through an obstacle course.	Carlo, Deniesse, Divine, Seichang
2	December 3 and 4, 2011 (Days 36 and 37)	Unidentified Objects; Each housemate had to wear blacked-out goggles and had to use their chin or elbows to correctly identify certain objects put before them—all in three minutes.	Kigoy; Steph
3	December 11, 2011 (Day 44)	Food Helmet; Each housemate had to eat certain food items while wearing a football helmet.	Biggel; Unad
4	January 1, 2012 (Day 65)	Bicycle Race; Both teams will ride bikes to go from one end to the other in the slowest possible time without crossing into the other lane or putting their feet on the ground.	Jerico; Seichang
5	February 12, 2012 (Day 107)	Cherry Stemming; Each housemate had to knot a cherry stem using their tongue in the fastest time.	Divine, (Paco)^{N1}
6	February 18, 2012 (Day 113)	Puzzle on a Trampoline; Each housemate will form a puzzle of the Head of Household immunity amulet while jumping on a trampoline.	Divine
7	February 24, 2012 (Day 119)	I Am The Big Winner; An extension of the weekly task, which concerned sitting on the throne.	(Paco)^{N2}
8	February 24, 2012 (Day 119)	M5's Choice; The M5 House Players would pick a housemate to become the Head of Household.	(Paco)^{N3}

Notes:

- ^N1 : Paco did not participate in the challenge, but was declared as HoH to protect his status as house player.
- ^N2 : Since Paco was the only one to sit on a special throne reserved for the Big Winner, he was declared the HoH.
- ^N3 : The M5 House Players were explicitly told by Big Brother to pick Paco as HoH to protect his status as house player.

== Nomination history ==
=== Overview ===
The housemate first mentioned in each nomination gets two points, while the second gets one point. The percentage of votes shown is the percentage of votes to save unless otherwise stated. Each house would field at least the highest two point gatherers to the list of nominees.

During Week 1, all 13 official housemates and one unofficial housemate lived in the slums. On Day 8, Carlo, the unofficial housemate, became an official housemate, and a second batch of 15 official housemates entered the House. On Day 15, six reserved housemates entered the house. Among the six reserved, Reg and Deniesse are two to become official housemates. On Days 23 and 25, two reserved housemates entered. Seth became an official housemate on Day 26, and Ryan on Day 30.

On Day 8, Jaz, Kevin, Kim, Paco, Pamu and Seichang transferred to the Industrial House to be part of the Unli-day group. On Day 21, Diane, Joya and Wendy transferred to the Luxury House, while on Day 22, Jaz and Seichang transferred to the Luxury House and became part of the Unli-night group. The same day, the remaining Unli-night housemates transferred to the Luxury House when the Slums was demolished. On Day 31, Luz and Seichang transferred to the Industrial House to be part of the Unli-Day group. On Day 66, the two groups switched houses, with the Unli-day group residing in the Luxury House and the Unli-night group residing in the Industrial house.

On Day 71, all housemates were instructed to live in the Industrial House, with the top 14 housemates going to the Luxury House at specified periods of time in the following week. On Days 77 and 79, Deniesse and Slater became part of Team Wayuk. On Day 78, the Industrial House was closed. On Day 106, the top 10 housemates merged into one group.

Challenges granting immunity were held before nominations. For the first nomination, secret challenges were held in both houses which granted the winner(s) immunity from being nominated. From the second nomination until the fifth nomination, and from the tenth nomination onwards, Head/s of Household (HOH) competitions were held in both houses, where the winner/s will be granted immunity in the coming nomination. For the seventh and eighth nominations, House Competitions also have group immunity in the coming nomination put at stake.

For this season, former housemates chosen by Big Brother were asked to come back as House Players, as indicated in the nominations table. The Day numbers indicate the day the house players entered the house. Paco, who was evicted on Day 106, did not leave the house and was tasked to be a house player. On Day 141, he was reinstated as an official wildcard housemate. Kigoy and Luz re-entered on Day 121 as part of the M6 twist, with Kigoy being Forcibly re-evicted on Day 124 and Luz re-evicted on Day 127. Seichang, who was evicted on Day 127, did not leave the house until Day 134.

Starting the 13th eviction, the "Power of One" rule was implemented wherein the public may only vote once per day per Sim card. Overnight voting was also done during the 6th, 8th, 14th and 15th nomination rounds, as well as the Big Night. Hour-long voting was done during the final nomination round.

=== Table ===
Legend:

Grey names indicate Unli-Night housemates living in the slums
Red names indicate Unli-Day/Team Wayuk housemates
Blue names indicate Unli-Night/Team High Voltage housemates
Black names indicate Top 10 remaining housemates
Automatic nomination (due to violation(s) committed, failure of task, reserved housemate evictions)
Granted immunity (due to a successful completion of a "Secret Task", a challenge winner.)
Head of Household

Pinoy Big Brother: Unlimited nomination history
	none	#1	#2	#3	#4	#5	#6	#7	#8	#9	#10	#11	#12	#13	#14	#15	#16	#17	#18	BIG NIGHT	Nominations received
	none	#1	#2	#3	#4	#5	#6	#7	Intensity 7	#9	#10	#11	#12	#13	#14	#15	#16	#17	#18	BIG NIGHT	Nominations received
Eviction Day and Date	Day 8 Nov 5	Day 20; Nov 17	Day 22; Nov 19	Day 29; Nov 26	Day 36; Dec 3	Day 43; Dec 10	Day 50; Dec 17	Day 71; Jan 7	Day 78; Jan 14	Day 92; Jan 28	Day 99; Feb 4	Day 106; Feb 11	Day 113; Feb 18	Day 120; Feb 25	Day 127; Mar 3	Day 134; Mar 10	Day 141; Mar 17	Day 148; Mar 24	Day 152; Mar 28	Day 155; Mar 31	Nominations received
Nomination day and Date	Day 7 Nov 4	Day 20; Nov 17	Day 21; Nov 18	Day 23; Nov 20	Day 31; Nov 28	Day 37; Dec 4	Day 44; Dec 11	Day 65; Jan 2	Day 71; Jan 7	Day 85; Jan 21	Day 93; Jan 29	Day 100; Feb 5	Day 107; Feb 12	Day 114; Feb 19	Day 121; Feb 26	Day 128; Mar 4	Day 135; Mar 11	Day 142; Mar 18	Day 151; Mar 27	Day 154; Mar 30	Nominations received
Slater	Stay	Not eligible	Not eligible	Tol; Casey	Wendy; Jaz	Deniesse; Seth	Seth; Tol	Kigoy; Tol	No nominations	Biggel; Wendy	Paco	No nominations	Seichang; Tin	~~Paco~~; Seichang; Tin	Seichang; Biggel	Biggel; Tin	~~Paco~~; Biggel	No nominations	No nominations	Winner	1 + 5 (+2)
Pamu	Stay	Kulas	Not eligible	Lordwin; Lyn	Reg; Naprey	Paco; Erica	Luz; Erica	Luz; Jessica	No nominations	Carlo; Joya	Deniesse	No nominations	Seichang; Deniesse	~~Paco~~; Biggel; Seichang	Slater; Seichang	Carlo; Biggel	Divine; Carlo	No nominations	No nominations	Runner-Up	5
Biggel	Stay	Not eligible	Leave	Tol; Kigoy	Tol; Kigoy	Tol; Wendy	Seth; Deniesse	Wendy; Deniesse	No nominations	Divine; Joya	Wendy	No nominations	Deniesse; Seichang	~~Paco~~; Deniesse; Seichang	Kevin; Divine	Kevin; Slater	Divine; Slater	No nominations	No nominations	3rd Place	3 + 2 + 22 (+1)
Paco	Stay	Reg	Not eligible	Unad; Lyn	Reg; Unad	Erica; Pamu	Naprey; Erica	Steph; Jessica	No nominations	Carlo; Divine	Deniesse	No nominations	Evicted (Day 106)					Re-entered (Day 141)	No nominations	4th Place	13 + ~~27~~ (+1)
Divine	Stay	Not eligible	Deniesse	Kigoy; Diane	Jaz; Wendy	Seth; Tol	Seth; Wendy	Kigoy; Wendy	No nominations	Wendy; Tin	Wendy	No nominations	Seichang; Biggel	~~Paco~~; Seichang; Tin	Seichang; Biggel	Biggel; Tin	~~Paco~~; Biggel	No nominations	No nominations	Evicted (Day 152)	12 + 3 + 10
Tin	Stay	Not eligible	Cindy	Kigoy; Eting	Tol; Kigoy	Seth; Deniesse	Seth; Deniesse	Kigoy; Tol	No nominations	Biggel; Joya	Wendy	No nominations	Seichang; Biggel	Seichang; ~~Paco~~; Carlo	Seichang; Divine	Biggel; Kevin	~~Paco~~; Divine	No nominations	Evicted (Day 148)		6 + 11 (+2)
Carlo	Nominated	Not eligible	Stay	Kigoy; Wendy	Jaz; Casey	Tol; Seth	Seth; Tol	Kigoy; Wendy	No nominations	Wendy; Divine	Wendy	No nominations	Seichang; Kevin	Seichang; ~~Paco~~; Tin	Seichang; Kevin	Biggel; Kevin	~~Paco~~; Biggel	Evicted (Day 141)			2 + 7 + 11 (+1)
Kevin	Stay	Kulas	Not eligible	Erica; Lyn	Naprey; Unad	Erica; Luz	Erica; Kim	Steph; Luz	No nominations	Carlo; Divine	Deniesse	No nominations	Biggel; Carlo	Seichang; Carlo; Biggel	Divine; Seichang	Tin; Biggel	Evicted (Day 134)				9 + 10 (+1)
Seichang	Stay	Reg	Not eligible	Jessica; Erica	Exempt	Erica; Lyn	Erica; Luz	Luz; Kim	No nominations	Wendy; Divine	Deniesse	No nominations	Deniesse; Carlo	Deniesse; Carlo; Tin	Tin; Divine	Evicted (Day 127)					5 + 40
Deniesse	Not in the House	Not eligible	Nominated	Exempt	Kigoy; Casey	Seth; Jerico	Seth; Tin	Kigoy; Wendy	No nominations	Wendy; Joya	Seichang	No nominations	Seichang; Kevin	~~Paco~~; Seichang; Kevin	Forced Eviction (Day 120)						17 + 4 + 12 (+1)
Eting	Not in the House	Not eligible	Stay	Diane; Joya	Wendy; Casey	Wendy; Deniesse	Deniesse; Wendy	Wendy; Deniesse	No nominations	Divine; Tin	Wendy	No nominations	Deniesse; Carlo	Evicted (Day 113)							1 (+1)
Wendy	Not in the House	Not eligible	Not eligible	Joya; Tol	Jaz; Casey	Seth; Tol	Seth; Kigoy	Kigoy; Tol	No nominations	Divine; Joya	Carlo	Evicted (Day 99)									46 + 5
Jessica	Not in the House	Kulas	Not eligible	Lordwin; Unad	Reg; Unad	Kim; Luz	Erica; Paco	Ryan; Luz	No nominations	Joya; Carlo	Forced Eviction (Day 93)										10
Joya	Not in the House	Not eligible	Not eligible	Kigoy; Tol	Jaz; Wendy	Seth; Tol	Seth; Tol	Kigoy; Tol	No nominations	Wendy; Tin	Evicted (Day 92)										10 + 4
Naprey	Not in the House	Kulas	Not eligible	Erica; Jaz	Reg; Unad	Kim; Jessica	Erica; Paco	Luz; Pamu	No nominations	Evicted (Day 78)											12
Unad	Not in the House	Reg	Not eligible	Kevin; Jessica	Reg; Naprey	Luz; Lyn	Kevin; Luz	Luz; Jessica	No nominations	Evicted (Day 78)											11
Roy	Leave	Not eligible	Stay	Wendy; Tol	Wendy; Jaz	Seth; Wendy	Seth; Wendy	Tol; Kigoy	No nominations	Evicted (Day 78)											5
Ryan	Not in the House				Exempt	Erica; Luz	Erica; Paco	Jessica; Luz	No nominations	Evicted (Day 78)											2
Jerico	Not in the House	Not eligible	Stay	Kigoy; Joya	Jaz; Joya	Deniesse; Seth	Tol; Seth	Tol; Deniesse	No nominations	Evicted (Day 78)											6
Steph	Not in the House	Reg	Not eligible	Lordwin; Lyn	Reg; Unad	Luz; Lyn	Paco; Erica	Paco; Luz	No nominations	Evicted (Day 78)											7
Kim	Stay	Kulas	Not eligible	Erica; Kevin	Reg; Kevin	Lyn; Pamu	Erica; Seichang	Luz; Paco	Forced Eviction (Day 71)												8 (+1)
Kigoy	Stay	Not eligible	Stay	Wendy; Diane	Wendy; Jaz	Wendy; Deniesse	Jerico; Carlo	Deniesse; Roy	Evicted (Day 71)												35
Tol	Not in the House	Not eligible	Stay	Diane; Wendy	Roy; Jerico	Divine; Roy	Jerico; Divine	Joya; Tin	Evicted (Day 71)												35
Luz	Stay	Not eligible	Rhea	Tol; Diane	Exempt	Lyn; Seichang	Paco; Erica	Pamu; Steph	Evicted (Day 71)												30
Seth	Not in the House				Exempt	Divine; Slater	Wendy; Deniesse	Evicted (Day 50)													34
Erica	Not in the House	Kulas	Not eligible	Unad; Kevin	Reg; Kevin	Luz; Lyn	Kim; Jessica	Evicted (Day 50)													37
Mark	Not in the House	Reg	Not eligible	Erica; Seichang	Naprey; Reg	Lyn; Luz	Forced Eviction (Day 43)														1 (+2)
Lyn	Not in the House	RJ	Not eligible	Naprey; Jaz	Reg; Mark	Luz; Seichang	Voluntary Exit (Day 43)														14
Casey	Not in the House	Not eligible	Deniesse	Kigoy; Biggel	Jaz; Wendy	Evicted (Day 36)															6
Reg	Not in the House	Nominated	Not eligible	Exempt	Naprey; Unad	Forced Eviction (Day 36)															25 (+1)
Jaz	Stay	Kulas	Not eligible	Erica; Kevin	Tol; Casey	Voluntary Exit (Day 31)															2 + 15
Diane	Not in the House	Not eligible	Not eligible	Kigoy; Tin	Evicted (Day 29)																7
Lordwin	Not in the House	Reg	Not eligible	Steph; Erica	Evicted (Day 29)																6
Cindy	Not in the House	Not eligible	Nominated	Evicted (Day 22)																	(+1)
Rhea	Not in the House	Not eligible	Nominated	Evicted (Day 22)																	(+1)
RJ	Not in the House	Nominated	Forced Eviction (Day 21)																		1 (+1)
Kulas	Not in the House	Nominated	Evicted (Day 20)																		7 (+1)
Notes	^{See note 1}	^{See note 2}	^{See note 3}	^{See note 4}	^{See note 5}	^{See note 6}	^{See note 7}		^{See note 8}	^{See note 9}	^{See note 10}	^{See note 11}	^{See note 12}	^{See note 13}	^{See note 14}	^{See note 15}	^{See note 16}	^{See note 17}		^{See note 18}	
Head(s) of Household Challenge Winners (Immune)	none			~~Erica~~; Paco	Erica; Jessica; Kim; Lyn; Paco; Pamu; Steph	Steph	Unad	Seichang	none	Deniesse; Jessica; Kevin; Paco; Pamu; Seichang; Slater	none		Divine (Paco)	Divine	(Paco)	(Paco)	none				
Head(s) of Household Challenge Winners (Immune)	none			~~Erica~~; Paco	Carlo; Deniesse; Divine; Seichang	Kigoy	Biggel	Jerico	none	Deniesse; Jessica; Kevin; Paco; Pamu; Seichang; Slater	none		Divine (Paco)	Divine	(Paco)	(Paco)	none				
Up for eviction	Carlo	Kulas; Reg; RJ	Cindy; Deniesse; Rhea	Erica; Kim; Lordwin; Mark	Naprey; Reg; Unad	Erica; Luz; Lyn; Mark	Erica; Luz; Paco	Jessica; Kevin; Luz; Steph	Open Voting	Carlo; Divine; Joya; Wendy	Deniesse; Wendy	Paco; Tin	Biggel; ~~Deniesse~~; Eting; Seichang; Slater	Carlo; Deniesse; Seichang; Tin	Divine; Kevin; Seichang	Biggel; Carlo; Kevin; Tin	Biggel; Carlo; Divine; Slater	Open Voting			
Up for eviction	Carlo	Kulas; Reg; RJ	Cindy; Deniesse; Rhea	Diane; Kigoy; Slater; Tol	Casey; Jaz; Tol; Wendy	Deniesse; Seth; Tol	Deniesse; Seth; Tol; Wendy	Deniesse; Kigoy; Tol; Wendy	Open Voting	Carlo; Divine; Joya; Wendy	Deniesse; Wendy	Paco; Tin	Biggel; ~~Deniesse~~; Eting; Seichang; Slater	Paco	Divine; Kevin; Seichang	Biggel; Carlo; Kevin; Tin	Paco	Open Voting			
Saved from eviction	Carlo; 12 of 13 votes to stay	Reg 6 of 14 votes to evict	~~Cindy~~ Deniesse ~~Rhea~~ 6 of 7 votes to stay	Mark 20.17% Kim 19.95% Erica 6.82%	Naprey Unad	Erica Luz	Paco 40.62% Luz 1.35%	Steph 37.78% Jessica 28.29% Kevin 25.19%	Results Paco; 24.04% Jessica; 13.44% Seichang; 12.18% Kevin; 11.28% Pamu; 11.01% ~~Steph~~; 10.62% ~~Naprey~~; 8.91% ~~Unad~~; 6.42% ~~Ryan~~; 2.09% Results Tin; 17.98% Biggel; 17.62% Slater; 10.94% Carlo; 10.59% Wendy; 9.94% Divine; 9.66% Deniesse; 6.19% Eting; 5.65% ~~Jerico~~; 5.45% Joya; 4.27% ~~Roy~~; 1.71%	Divine; 64.47% Wendy; 16.01% Carlo; 12.50%	Deniesse; 53.59%	Tin; 57.37%	Slater; 42.28% Biggel; 30.19% Seichang; 18.44%	Tin; 36.22% Seichang; 28.80% ~~Deniesse~~; 20.85% Carlo; 14.13%	Divine; 49.17% Kevin; 27.69%	Tin; 27.86% Biggel; 25.02% Carlo; 24.56%	Biggel; 33.67% Slater; 26.79% Divine; 21.01%	Biggel; 19.49% Divine; 19.20% Paco; 18.39% Pamu; 17.26% Slater; 14.16%	Slater; 49.51% Paco; 16.91% Biggel; 15.56% Pamu; 12.51%	Slater; 40.02%	
Saved from eviction	Carlo; 12 of 13 votes to stay	~~RJ~~; 1 of 14 votes to evict	Deniesse 2 of 4 votes to stay	Slater 28.95% Kigoy 7.93% Tol 6.39%	Wendy 22.58% Tol 11.07%	Deniesse Seth Tol	Wendy 30.27% Deniesse 72.84% Tol 2.82%	Deniesse 40.76% Wendy 37.91%	Overall; Results Tin; 10.57% Biggel; 10.36% Paco; 9.91% Slater; 6.44% Carlo; 6.23% Wendy; 5.84% Divine; 5.66% Jessica; 5.54% Seichang; 5.02% Kevin; 4.65% Pamu; 4.54% ~~Steph~~; 4.37% ~~Naprey~~; 3.67% Deniesse; 3.64%	Divine; 64.47% Wendy; 16.01% Carlo; 12.50%	Deniesse; 53.59%	Tin; 57.37%	Slater; 42.28% Biggel; 30.19% Seichang; 18.44%	Paco; 64.61% to remain as house player	Divine; 49.17% Kevin; 27.69%	Tin; 27.86% Biggel; 25.02% Carlo; 24.56%	Paco; 73.37% to stay as wildcard housemate	Biggel; 19.49% Divine; 19.20% Paco; 18.39% Pamu; 17.26% Slater; 14.16%	Slater; 49.51% Paco; 16.91% Biggel; 15.56% Pamu; 12.51%	Slater; 40.02%	
Evicted	Jaz; Kevin; Kim; Paco; Pamu; Seichang fake evicted	Kulas; 7 of 14 votes to evict	Diane; Joya; Wendy fake evicted	Lordwin; 4.56%	Casey; 10.75%	No; Eviction	Erica -1.22%	Luz; 8.75% to save	Steph; Jessica's vote to evict	Joya; 7.03% to save	Wendy; 46.41% to save	Paco; 42.63% to save	Eting; 9.09% to save	No; Eviction	Seichang; 23.15% to save	Kevin; 22.56% to save	Carlo; 18.54% to save	Tin; 11.50% to save	Divine; 5.51% to save	Pamu; 21.49% Biggel; 21.39% Paco; 17.10%	
Evicted	Jaz; Kevin; Kim; Paco; Pamu; Seichang fake evicted	Kulas; 7 of 14 votes to evict	Diane; Joya; Wendy fake evicted	Lordwin; 4.56%	Casey; 10.75%	No; Eviction	Erica -1.22%	Luz; 8.75% to save	Naprey; Ryan; Unad lost challenge	Joya; 7.03% to save	Wendy; 46.41% to save	Paco; 42.63% to save	Eting; 9.09% to save	No; Eviction	Seichang; 23.15% to save	Kevin; 22.56% to save	Carlo; 18.54% to save	Tin; 11.50% to save	Divine; 5.51% to save	Pamu; 21.49% Biggel; 21.39% Paco; 17.10%	
Evicted	Jaz; Kevin; Kim; Paco; Pamu; Seichang fake evicted	Kulas; 7 of 14 votes to evict	Cindy; 1 of 4 votes to stay	Diane -9.38%	Casey; 10.75%	No; Eviction	Seth; 0.40%	Kigoy; 14.77% to save	Jerico; Wendy's vote to evict	Joya; 7.03% to save	Wendy; 46.41% to save	Paco; 42.63% to save	Eting; 9.09% to save	No; Eviction	Seichang; 23.15% to save	Kevin; 22.56% to save	Carlo; 18.54% to save	Tin; 11.50% to save	Divine; 5.51% to save	Pamu; 21.49% Biggel; 21.39% Paco; 17.10%	
Evicted	Jaz; Kevin; Kim; Paco; Pamu; Seichang fake evicted	Kulas; 7 of 14 votes to evict	Rhea; 1 of 4 votes to stay	Diane -9.38%	Casey; 10.75%	No; Eviction	Seth; 0.40%	Tol; 6.56% to save	Roy refused to take part in challenge	Joya; 7.03% to save	Wendy; 46.41% to save	Paco; 42.63% to save	Eting; 9.09% to save	No; Eviction	Seichang; 23.15% to save	Kevin; 22.56% to save	Carlo; 18.54% to save	Tin; 11.50% to save	Divine; 5.51% to save	Pamu; 21.49% Biggel; 21.39% Paco; 17.10%	
Forced Eviction	none	RJ	none		Reg	Mark	none	Kim	none	Jessica	none			Deniesse	none					Pamu; 21.49% Biggel; 21.39% Paco; 17.10%	
Voluntary Exit	none				Jaz	Lyn	none													Pamu; 21.49% Biggel; 21.39% Paco; 17.10%	

=== Notes ===
^Note 1 : Carlo is the first of the reserved housemates to be given the chance to enter the house. As he was not able to complete the four tasks assigned to him, Big Brother asked the official housemates to decide for Carlo's chance to stay, giving him a status to become an official housemate. He received 12 out of 13 votes to stay and was therefore declared an official housemate. Since the Slums housemates failed their weekly task, six of them will be "evicted" (in reality, moving to the Industrial House). This was determined by Carlo randomly picking six rattan boxes containing the clothes of the 13 other housemates. The clothes Carlo picked belonged to Jaz, Kevin, Kim, Paco, Pamu and Seichang.
^Note 2 : The Power Strangers were put on the voting gauntlet with the housemates voting using ears of corn hung on their necks. Kulas, the Blue Stranger, received most number of ears, seven out of 14, and therefore, was evicted from the house. Subsequently, RJ and Reg are tasked to conceal their faces until they become an official housemate, otherwise, they get forced eviction. However, Lordwin and Unad are tasked to unmask and take a picture of them. Lordwin successfully took a picture of RJ, which cost RJ's chance of becoming an official housemate.
^Note 3 : The Slums male housemates (excluding Slater) were asked if they want the 3Gs to stay, in exchange for three of their female housemates being "evicted" (in reality, moving to the Luxury House). Six of the seven eligible Slums male housemates chose the 3Gs to stay in exchange for Diane, Joya and Wendy. Big Brother then told 3Gs that only one of them would be an official housemate because not all of the men in the slums agree to make them an official housemate. With the remaining Slums female housemates deciding on their fate, Deniesse was declared an official housemate. She received most of the votes, two out of four, to stay.
^Note 4 : Slater declined to continue his task to make Joya believe he was in love with her, making Big Brother fulfill his promise of giving him an automatic nomination if he declines or fails. Kim and Mark's secret relationship is revealed through a mock trial session, thus being given automatic nomination. Paco and Erica were given immunity for successfully doing their part as jurors but Erica later gave up her immunity. Being new housemates, Deniesse and Reg were exempted from nominations. Jaz and Seichang had undergone nominations in the Industrial House before transferring to the Luxury House. Their votes were counted in their former house and they were exempted from nominations in their new house.
^Note 5 : As new housemates, Seth and Ryan are exempted from the nominations. Luz and Seichang moved to the Industrial House on Day 30. Nominations took place on Day 31, hence they are exempt from nominations. Seichang was also one of the HOH in the Luxury House before his transfer. UnliDay voting was stopped due to Reg's pending exit by forced eviction due to the numerous and grave House rule violations he committed.
^Note 6 : Mark was automatically nominated after losing to Luz in a challenge held due to their violations to the house rules. Voting for the nominees were stopped due to Lyn's voluntary exit and Mark's forced eviction because of numerous rule violations.
^Note 7 : Big Brother asked the housemates in the Industrial house if they wanted to give anyone in the house an automatic nomination. Ryan chose to automatically nominate Kevin. Ryan was required to undergo the regular nomination process as well, thereby nominating three people for this round. Big Brother instructed the teams to switch houses.
^Note 8 : On Day 71, Big Brother announced that all housemates will undergo overnight public voting and that only 14 housemates will remain at the end of the week. The top five vote earners from each group will remain and the remaining four will be determined by other means. Even though the 8th, 12th and 13th top vote earners of the overall vote were not revealed, it could be deduced from the per-house results that Jessica, Steph and Naprey were the 8th, 12th and 13th top vote earners, respectively. It was announced that the Intensity 7 Saturday eviction is the sixth eviction night of the season. Jerico and Steph were officially evicted on Day 74, Ryan on Day 75, Roy on Day 76 and Naprey and Unad on Day 77. The housemates, however, left the house on Day 78.
^Note 9 Team Wayuk won nomination immunity for winning their House Competition, resulting in all nominees coming from team High- Voltage only.
^Note 10 As part of Big Brother's punishment to the housemates for failing the eighth House Competition, all of the remaining housemates will nominate one of their teammates face to face as the least deserving housemate. Team High Voltage picked Wendy, while Team Wayuk picked Deniesse. Wendy and Deniesse will do a task assigned by Big Brother. Also, Kevin, Pamu and Tin went on the Big Road Trip but three failed to accomplish their task resulting in an eviction between Deniesse and Wendy decided by overnight voting.
^Note 11 Tin was automatically nominated after failing a challenge based on the Big Road Trip. Paco reaped the automatic nomination for talking about the nomination process. Both nominations were only made known to the nominees. Despite being evicted as a housemate, Paco stayed in the house and became a House Player.
^Note 12 Because of not fully succeeding in the Great Marinduque Adventure, Slater agreed to be automatically nominated. As Head of Household, Divine was tasked to replace a nominee and she chose to replace Deniesse with Biggel. As House Player, Paco was tasked to add a housemate to the list of nominees and he chose Eting.
^Note 13 Big Brother implemented a new nomination scheme wherein a housemate will nominate three other housemates. The housemate first mentioned gets three points, second mentioned gets two points, while the third gets one point. All points towards Paco do not count as he is a house player. Voting for the nominees was stopped due to Deniesse's forced eviction as a result of grave House violations she committed. Because of this, Carlo, who got the fewest votes, was not evicted. Meanwhile, the public were asked to vote on Paco's fate as a House Player. The results denoted that Paco should stay.
^Note 14 The housemates underwent a mock nomination before the normal nomination process wherein only Kevin, Seichang and Slater changed their votes. Because of this, original nominee Slater was saved, while Divine was added to the list of nominees. Despite being evicted as a housemate, Seichang stayed in the house.
^Note 15 Big Brother asked the M5 to automatically nominate someone from the remaining housemates and they chose Tin. The housemates underwent a mock face to face nomination before the normal nomination process. Because of this, Carlo was added to the list of nominees.
^Note 16 Big Brother implemented the "Power of One" rule wherein if a housemate receives even one vote, he will automatically be put on the nomination list. Any votes cast by Paco (Divine and Slater) and for Paco do not count. On Day 139, Paco was given a chance to become a wildcard housemate with the public deciding his fate. The wildcard housemate public poll also used the "Power of One" rule.
^Note 17 Because the housemates failed the "Big Shot for the Big Slot" challenge, only four slots are open for the finale and one of the final five has to be evicted in a mid-week eviction.
^Note 18 For the last three open voting rounds, votes are reset after each eviction. Only votes cast after Divine's eviction are counted towards the Big Night total, unlike previous seasons wherein all votes cast during open voting (including between evictions) were counted.

=== S–E voting system result ===
Below is the eviction voting result from the first to fourth eviction round. This voting system was stopped after the fourth eviction round.

Legend:
Red names indicate housemates living in the industrial house
Blue names indicate housemates living in the luxury house

Eviction No.	Nominated Housemate	Votes			Result
Eviction No.	Nominated Housemate	To-Save	To-Evict	Net	Result
1	Erica	9.88%	-3.06%	6.82%	Saved
1	Kim	31.79%	-11.84%	19.95%	Saved
1	Lordwin	10.56%	-6.00%	4.56%	Evicted
1	Mark	23.53%	-3.36%	20.17%	Saved
1	Diane	6.86%	-16.24%	-9.38%	Evicted
1	Kigoy	21.95%	-14.02%	7.93%	Saved
1	Slater	29.96%	-1.01%	28.95%	Saved
1	Tol	8.17%	-1.78%	6.39%	Saved
2	Naprey	Voting cancelled			Saved
2	Reg	Voting cancelled			Forced Eviction
2	Unad	Voting cancelled			Saved
2	Casey	15.90%	-5.15%	10.76%	Evicted
2	Tol	17.88%	-6.81%	11.07%	Saved
2	Wendy	38.42%	-15.83%	22.59%	Saved
3	Erica	Voting cancelled			Saved
3	Luz	Voting cancelled			Saved
3	Lyn	Voting cancelled			Voluntary exit
3	Mark	Voting cancelled			Forced Eviction
3	Deniesse	Voting cancelled			Saved
3	Seth	Voting cancelled			Saved
3	Tol	Voting cancelled			Saved
4	Erica	3.81%	-5.03%	-1.22%	Evicted
4	Luz	3.27%	-1.92%	1.35%	Saved
4	Paco	63.29%	-22.67%	40.62%	Saved
4	Deniesse	26.52%	-13.68%	12.84%	Saved
4	Seth	5.71%	-5.31%	0.40%	Evicted
4	Tol	7.90%	-5.08%	2.82%	Saved
4	Wendy	33.03%	-2.76%	30.27%	Saved

=== Christmas nomination ===
On Day 51, the housemates were asked to nominate who they think deserves to get a gift from Big Brother for Christmas. The six recipients, together with the other housemates, must work together to get the gifts. The housemate first mentioned in each nomination gets two points, while the second gets one point.

Legend:
Red names indicate Unli-Day/Team Wayuk housemates
Blue names indicate Unli-Night/Team High Voltage housemates

	Christmas nomination special		Nominations received
Jessica	Steph; Paco		0
Kevin	Ryan; Paco		2
Kim	Naprey; Unad		2
Luz	Pamu; Naprey		2
Naprey	Luz; Seichang		4
Paco	Kim; Kevin		2
Pamu	Steph; Unad		6
Ryan	Seichang; Kevin		2
Seichang	Pamu; Steph		6
Steph	Pamu; Seichang		5
Unad	Seichang; Naprey		2
Biggel	Kigoy; Eting		17
Carlo	Eting; Kigoy		0
Deniesse	Biggel; Eting		0
Divine	Tol; Eting		0
Eting	Tol; Biggel		10
Jerico	Biggel; Kigoy		0
Joya	Biggel; Eting		0
Kigoy	Biggel; Eting		8
Roy	Eting; Biggel		0
Slater	Biggel; Kigoy		0
Tin	Biggel; Kigoy		0
Tol	Eting; Kigoy		4
Wendy	Biggel; Kigoy		0
Christmas gift recipients	Pamu; Seichang; Steph	Biggel; Eting; Kigoy	

=== Mock nominations ===
For the 12th and 13th Nominations, the housemates underwent mock nominations before the normal nomination process.

Mock Nominations
Eviction Day and Date	Day 121 Feb 26	Day 124 Mar 4	Mock nomination points received
Biggel	Kevin; Divine	Biggel; Slater	5
Carlo	Seichang; Kevin	Kevin; Slater	1
Divine	Seichang; Biggel	Kevin; Tin	4
Kevin	Slater; Divine	Kevin; Tin	9
Paco	House Player	Divine; Slater	0
Pamu	Slater; Seichang	Biggel; Carlo	0
Slater	Seichang; Kevin	Biggel; Kevin	8
Tin	Seichang; Divine	Biggel; Kevin	4
Seichang	Tin; Slater	House Player	9
Notes	^{M1}	^{M2}	
Mock Nominees	Kevin; Seichang; Slater	Biggel; Kevin	
Real Nominees	Divine; Kevin; Seichang	Biggel; Carlo; Kevin; Tin	

Nominated Housemates
Head of Household

==== Notes ====
^M1 : Big Brother asked the housemates to nominate two housemates they feel that are not showing their true selves. Big Brother then told Paco to have a conference towards the same issue. After the conference, Big Brother asked the housemates to again nominate their housemates. Only Kevin, Seichang and Slater changed their votes.
^M2 : The remaining housemates (including Paco) underwent a face to face nomination where they will mention two names. Big Brother then told the housemates to have a conference regarding the nominees. After the conference, Big Brother asked the housemates to again nominate their housemates.

=== Ideal Big Four Lists ===
On Day 149, Big Brother ordered the remaining five housemates to make their ideal Big Four list (from first to fourth place) for the upcoming Big Night using a podium in the living room.

Ideal Big Four Lists
Housemate	1st	2nd	3rd	4th	5th
Biggel	Pamu	Slater	Divine	Biggel	Paco
Divine	Pamu	Paco	Slater	Divine	Biggel
Paco	Paco	Pamu	Divine	Slater	Biggel
Pamu	Pamu	Paco	Divine	Slater	Biggel
Slater	Slater	Pamu	Paco	Divine	Biggel

== The Big Night at The Grandstand ==
On March 31, 2012, 154 days after the season started, at the Quirino Grandstand, Slater Young was declared the Big Winner after amassing 40.02% of the votes and took home ₱2,000,000, in addition to other special prizes. Leaving before him were Second Big Placer Pamu with 21.49% of the votes who received ₱1,000,000, Third Big Placer Biggel with 21.39% of the votes who received ₱500,000, and Fourth Big Placer Paco with 17.10% of the votes who received ₱300,000. Slater thus earned the distinction of being the first male winner of a regular season four years after Ruben Gonzaga was declared as the first male winner of the entire franchise. The Big Night voting was only done overnight, with the Power of One rule in effect. This is also the first and only season wherein only vote percentages are shown and not the actual number of votes. The theme of the Big Night is Filipino style.

This table shows the summary of votes as obtained by each of the Big 4 in the Big Night.

Event	Big 4	Votes	Result
Event	Big 4	Percentage	Result
Big Night	Biggel	21.39%	3rd Place
Big Night	Paco	17.10%	4th Place
Big Night	Pamu	21.49%	Runner-Up
Big Night	Slater	40.02%	Winner
TOTAL VOTES		100%	—N/a

Preceded by Teen Clash 2010	Pinoy Big Brother Unlimited (October 29, 2011–March 31, 2012)	Succeeded by Teen Edition 4
