= Pamu Pamorada =

Filipina actress and comedian

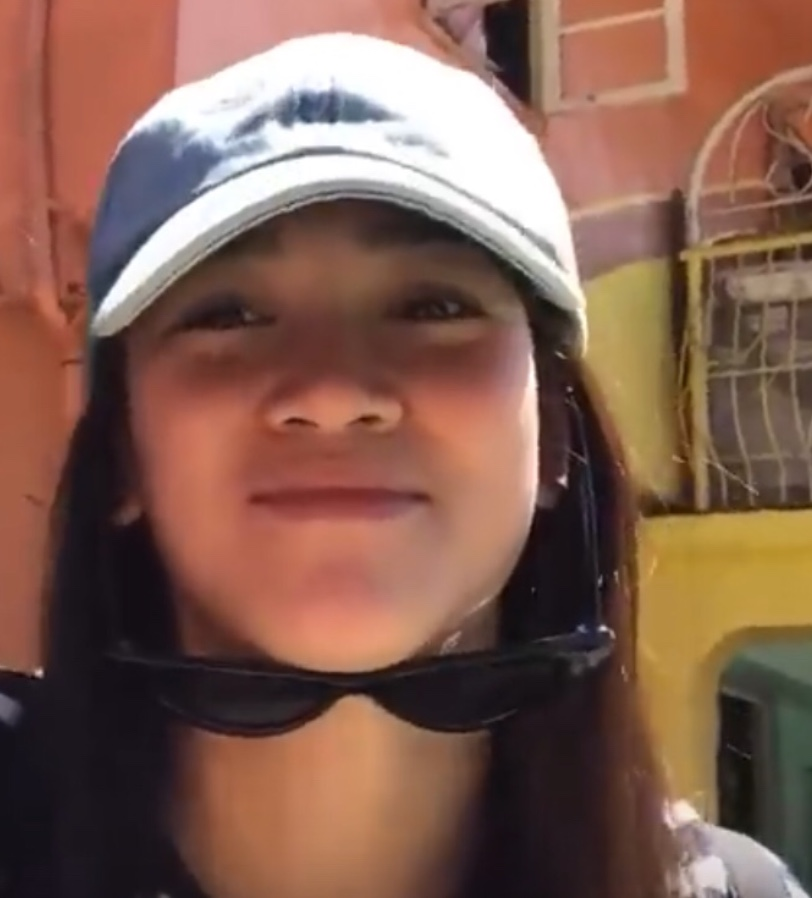
- Pamorada in Baguio
- Born: Annielie Gerez Pamorada; Lipa, Batangas, Philippines
- Occupations: actress; comedian
- Years active: 2011–present
- Agent: Star Magic (2012–present)
- Known for: Pinoy Big Brother: Unlimited

Annielie Gerez Pamorada, better known as Pamu Pamorada, is a Filipina actress and comedian from Lipa, Batangas.

== Biography ==
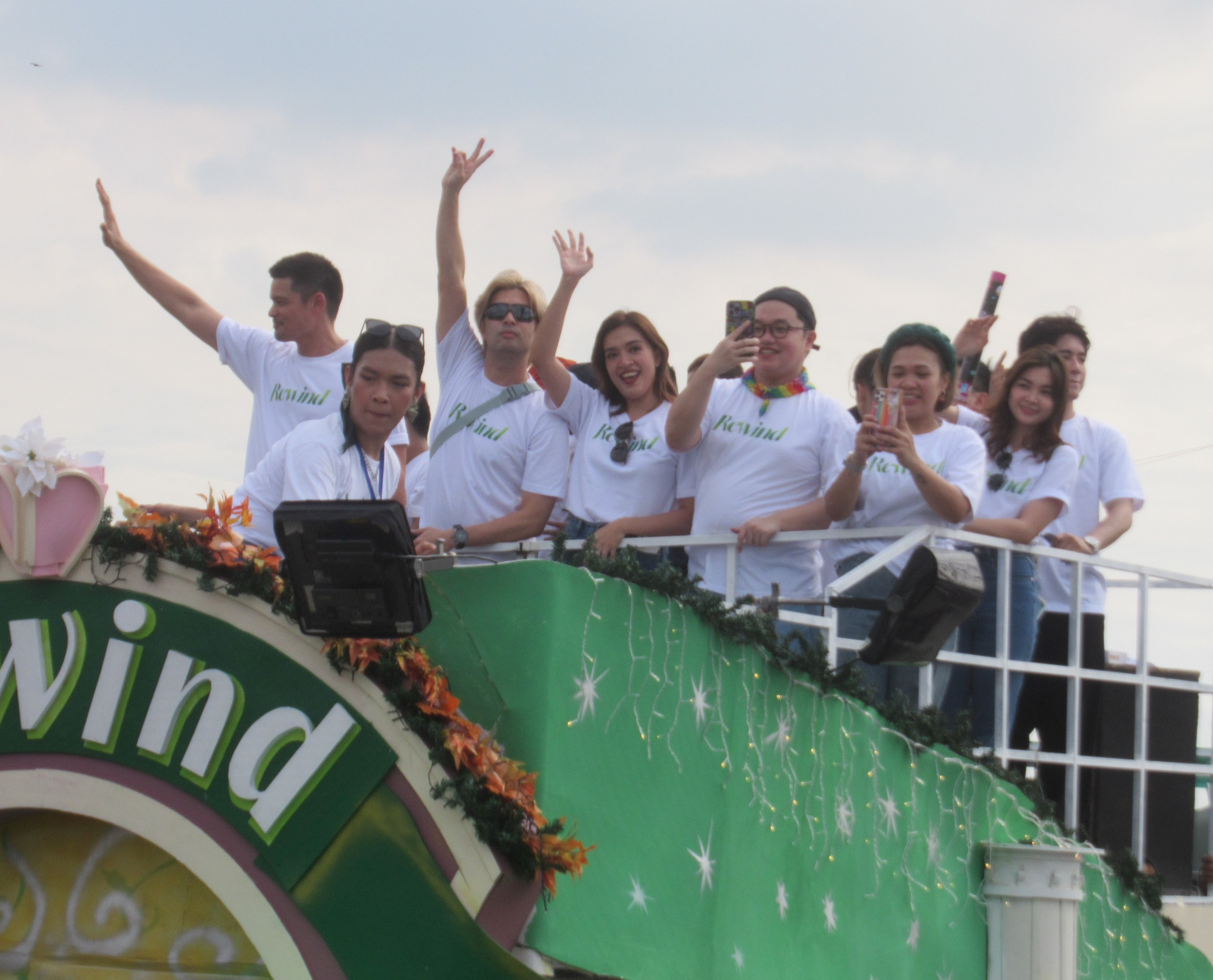
Pamorada in Rewind

She was abandoned by her parents in her childhood. She started her career in showbusiness after she won as the 2nd Big Placer of Pinoy Big Brother: Unlimited on Day 155. Since then, she has made some guest appearances in different television programs and teleseries in ABS-CBN. Her biggest break came in 2014, when she was given a major supporting role as the best friend of Kathryn Bernardo's character in the blockbuster film, She's Dating the Gangster.

== Filmography ==
=== Television ===
Year	Title	Role
2011–2012	Pinoy Big Brother: Unlimited	Herself/Housemate/2nd Big Placer
2012–2013	Kahit Puso'y Masugatan	Rebecca "Bekka" Espiritu
2012–2013	Precious Hearts Romances Presents: Paraiso	Myla Lumbao
2014	The Legal Wife	Trish De Villa
2014	Ikaw Lamang	Cherry
2014	Be Careful With My Heart	Clarita
2015	Dream Dad	Lilet
2015	Pangako Sa'Yo	Kim
2016	Tubig at Langis	Pilar Custodio
2017	A Love To Last	Maxine
2017	Wansapanataym: Louie's Biton	Paris
2018	The Blood Sisters	Pam
2019	The Killer Bride	Tsoknat Tumulak
2019	Hinahanap-Hanap Kita	Margot
2021	Maalaala Mo Kaya: Paru-paro	Barista
2022	2 Good 2 Be True	Gemma
2022	Maalaala Mo Kaya: Kakanin and Ring Light	Nene
2024	Halfmates	
2024–2025	Lavender Fields	Petunia Hidalgo

=== Online ===
Year	Title	Role
2019	PBB Bring 8 On!	Host

=== Movies ===
Year	Title	Role
2014	She's Dating the Gangster	Sara Jung
2016	The Unmarried Wife	Laika
2017	Unexpectedly Yours	Eunice
2023	Rewind	Hannah
