= The Biggest Loser Pinoy Edition =

- Genre: Reality competition
- Created by: Ben Silverman; Mark Koops; Dave Broome
- Presented by: Iza Calzado (Season 2); Matteo Guidicelli (Season 2); Robi Domingo (Season 2); Sharon Cuneta (Season 1); Derek Ramsay (Season 1)
- Starring: Jim Saret (Season 1); Toni Saret (Season 2); Chinggay Andrada (Season 1)
- Opening theme: "Sabay Tayo" by Mayonnaise
- Country of origin: Philippines
- Original language: Filipino
- No. of seasons: 2
- No. of episodes: 161

Production
- Running time: 30-45 minutes
- Production companies: Reveille Productions; NBC Universal

Original release
- Network: ABS-CBN
- Release: May 30, 2011 – April 26, 2014

Related
- The Biggest Loser

The Biggest Loser Pinoy Edition is a Philippine television reality competition show broadcast by ABS-CBN. The show is based on the American game show of the same title. Originally hosted by Sharon Cuneta, it aired on the network's Primetime Bida and Yes Weekend! line up from May 30, 2011, to April 26, 2014, replacing Green Rose and was rep by Pinoy Big Brother: All In. Iza Calzado served as the final host.

== Premise ==
Each season of The Biggest Loser starts with a weigh-in to determine the contestants' starting weights, which serve as the baseline for determining the overall winner.

The contestants are separated into two teams of six contestants, each wearing separate colored T-shirts. The trainers are responsible (in conjunction with medical personnel retained by the show) for designing comprehensive workout and nutrition plans and teaching them to the contestants. However, the contestants are individually responsible for implementing the principles taught.

During an episode, various challenges and temptations are featured. Those who win a particular challenge are given special privileges, such as a weight advantage for the next weigh-in or even full immunity from being voted off the show.

Each week culminates in another weigh-in to determine which team has lost the most weight for that week, in percentage of total weight lost. The team that has lost the least percentage during that week (known as "falling below the yellow line", which refers to a line featured on a video screen showing the cutoff between safety and being at-risk) will have one member voted off (unless the team consists of only one remaining member, in which case there is no vote). The vote is usually made by the other teams, though some episodes feature one team making the decision alone.

When the number of contestants has shrunk to a predetermined smaller number (unknown to the contestants), the teams are dissolved and the contestants compete one-on-one against each other.

== Overview ==
=== Primer ===
Bigating Pinoy: The Biggest Loser Primer is a pre-season primer airing May 15, 2011 featuring obese Filipino stories such as child personality Carl Camo (son of Lito Camo) and talked about health risks and tips sponsored by St. Luke's Medical Center. The second pre-season primer entitled Bigating Simula: The Road to The Biggest Loser Pinoy Edition aired on May 29, 2011. This primer featured more of the basic premise and rules of the reality show to prepare for the next day's official premiere.

=== Prizes ===
The finale of the first season features both the contestants remaining on the show and those sent home early; the latter are brought back for the final show. Those sent home early compete for a smaller prize while those on the show compete for a larger prize and the title of "The Biggest Loser". The winner of The Biggest Loser will win ₱1,000,000, Artista Salon services worth ₱100,000, a fully furnished condominium unit from DMCI Homes, a lifetime membership with Fitness First, Vespa scooter, Sony Bravia television, and Whirlpool home appliances.

Not only does the Biggest Loser win prizes, but the other remaining finalists. During the first season, the second placer won ₱500,000, Artista Salon services worth ₱50,000, a one-year membership with Fitness First, and Whirlpool home appliances. The third placer won ₱300,000, Artista Salon services worth ₱25,000, a one-year membership with Fitness First, and Fujidenzo home appliances. The fourth placer won ₱200,000. The at-home winner won ₱200,000 and a one-year membership with Fitness First.

=== Location ===
The camp in which the contestants stay during the duration of their game is located at the previous Eagle Ridge Golf and Country Club in General Trias. It was renovated for the production of the reality show. The gym of the camp is courtesy of Fitness First, while the emergency health rooms are courtesy of St. Luke's Medical Center.

== Seasons ==
=== Season summary ===
Season	Premiere	Finale	Winner	Runner-up	Third place	Fourth place	Fifth place	At Home Winner	Host	Game Master(s)	Trainers
1	May 30, 2011	October 8, 2011	Larry Martin	Art Mendoza	Raffy Tan	Angela Lupangco	Hazel Chua	Ryan Razon	Sharon Cuneta	Derek Ramsay	Chinggay Andrada; Jim Saret
2	February 3, 2014	April 26, 2014	Bryan Castillo	Kayen Lazaro	Francis Asis	Osie Nebreja	None		Iza Calzado	Matteo Guidicelli; Robi Domingo	Jim Saret; Toni Saret

=== Season details ===
==== Season 1 ====
The first season premiered on May 30, 2011, and was hosted by Sharon Cuneta; Derek Ramsay hosted the challenges in the competition. Chinggay Andrada and Jim Saret served as trainers for the contestants, and was guided along with nutritionist Nadine Tengco and psychologist Randy Dellosa monitoring the contestants nutrition skills and personal counseling respectively. It ended on October 8, 2011, with Larry Martin, a former police officer, declared as the winner.

The entire season ran for 19 weeks and featured 16 contestants divided into 2 teams.

==== Doubles ====
A second season is in the works, which is set for a January 2014 premiere. The upcoming season will also follow the Doubles format of the fifth season of the American version. The show will be hosted by Iza Calzado and Matteo Guidicelli, replacing first season's host Sharon Cuneta and game master Derek Ramsay, respectively. Robi Domingo will also co-host the show. It ended on April 26, 2014, with Bryan Castillo emerged as the winner.

The entire season ran for 12 weeks and featured 14 pairs.
