= I Dare You (Philippine TV series) =

- Genre: Reality show
- Developed by: ABS-CBN Corporation
- Directed by: Nico Hernandez; Alco Guerrero
- Presented by: Melai Cantiveros; Robi Domingo; John Prats; Deniesse Joaquin
- Country of origin: Philippines
- Original language: Filipino
- No. of seasons: 2
- No. of episodes: 87

Production
- Executive producers: Alex Asuncion; Maritoni Esperida; Peter Edward Dizon
- Editor: Adz Abarquez
- Running time: 90 minutes

Original release
- Network: ABS-CBN
- Release: July 11, 2011 – December 28, 2013

I Dare You is a Philippine television reality competition show broadcast by ABS-CBN. Originally hosted by Jericho Rosales, Iya Villania and Melai Cantiveros. It aired on the network's Kapamilya Gold line up from July 11, 2011 to October 21, 2011, and was replaced by Pinoy Big Brother: Unlimited. The show returned on the network's Yes Weekend line up from October 12, 2013 to December 28, 2013, replacing The Voice of the Philippines and was replaced by The Biggest Loser Pinoy Edition: Doubles. Cantiveros, Robi Domingo, John Prats and Deniesse Joaquin serve as the final hosts.

== Format ==
=== Season 1 ===
I Dare You logo used in the first season.

Each week, the series showcases an everyday Filipino (an individual, family or community), who the show refers to as Bidang Kapamilya. These people are those who struggles everyday on life's challenges and have inspiring stories to tell. Together with the hosts, celebrity guests will be challenged to get out of their comfort zone and undergo different challenges to win prizes for the Bidang Kapamilya. Guests will experience the role of an ordinary people and what they do in an ordinary day.

== Cast ==
=== Final cast ===
| Name | Nickname (s) | Duration | Character |
|---|---|---|---|
| Melai Cantiveros | Melai, Isay | Episode 1 – 87 | She considers herself as the prettiest female host on the show. |
| Robi Domingo | Rob, Boy Waley | Episode 76 – 87 | The pretty boy who tries to be funny but can't seem to crack a good joke. |
| John Prats | Pratty | Episode 76 – 87 | Often mocked for his short height, he is a great dancer and has been longest in the entertainment industry out of all the hosts. |
| Deniesse Aguilar | Niesse, Bakla | Episode 76 – 87 | The girl famous for her "gay lingo," known for her strong personality, a rookie in the entertainment field. |

=== Former cast ===
| Name | Nickname (s) | Duration | Character |
|---|---|---|---|
| Jericho Rosales | Echo | Episode 1 – 75 | Former host, he's always surrounded by female guests as well as the female hosts which makes the other male hosts jealous, appears in Season 2 occasionally as guest. |
| Iya Villania | Rae | Episode 1 – 75 | She is sexy and athletic and always competes with Melai for Echo's heart. Left the show in the final episode of Season 1. |
| Ethel Booba | Booba | Episode 11 – 75 | Calls herself a "plastic surgery god" because of her numerous surgeries, she came in Episode 11 as a one-week guest host but later turned into a fixed-guest. |

== Challengers ==
| Episode # | Date # | Challengers |
Season 1
| 1-5 | July 11–15, 2011 | Gabriel Valenciano, Alessandra De Rossi and Jericho Rosales |
| 5-10 | July 18–22, 2011 | Jason Abalos, Angeline Quinto and Vice Ganda. |
| 11-15 | July 25–29, 2011 | Iya Villania, Ethel Booba, Phoemela Baranda and Miriam Quiambao. |
| 16-20 | August 1–5, 2011 | Kim Chiu, Ryan Bang, Niña Jose, Edward Mendez, Baron Geisler and Queenie Padilla. |
| 21-25 | August 8–12, 2011 | Matt Evans, Ping Medina, Chokoleit, Jomi Teotico and Rap Fernandez. |
| 26-30 | August 15–19, 2011 | RR Enriquez, Jon Avila, Keanna Reeves and Guji Lorenzana. |
| 31-35 | August 22–26, 2011 | Sharlene San Pedro, Bugoy Cariño, Izzy Canillo, Amy Nobleza and Jairus Aquino. |
| 36-40 | August 29–September 2, 2011 | Gladys Reyes, Ara Mina and Yayo Aguila. |
| 41-45 | September 5–9, 2011 | Jason Francisco, Paul Jake Castillo and Bangs Garcia. |
| 46-50 | September 12–16, 2011 | JM de Guzman, Robi Domingo and Sunshine Garcia. |
| 51-55 | September 19–23, 2011 | Cacai Bautista, Melai Cantiveros and Jayson Gainza. |
| 56-60 | September 26–30, 2011 | Bianca Manalo, Markki Stroem, Venus Raj and Manuel Chua. |
| 61-65 | October 3–7, 2011 | Alan Choachuy, Joy Siy, Eboy Bautista, Winwin Cabinta and Chinggay Andrada. |
| 66-70 | October 10–14, 2011 | Valerie Concepcion, Tom Rodriguez, Megan Young and Neil Coleta. |
| 71-75 | October 17–21, 2011 | Finale Special - re-run of favourite challenges of viewers. |
Season 2
| 1 | October 12, 2013 | Jewel Mische, John Prats, Saturday Alisco, Kevin Roman. |
| 2 | October 19, 2013 | Precious Lara Quigaman, Wendy Valdez, Tina Marasigan |
| 3 | October 26, 2013 | Baron Geisler, Deniesse Aguilar |
