= The Biggest Loser Pinoy Edition: Doubles =

- The show's tagline is Ang bigat ng buhay, mas magaan pag may karamay (English: The hardships of life is lighter when you have company).
- Created by: Dave Broome
- Written by: Dave Broome; Mark Koops; Benjamin Silverman
- Directed by: Jon Moll
- Presented by: Iza Calzado; Matteo Guidicelli; Robi Domingo
- Starring: Jim Saret; Toni Saret
- Opening theme: "Sabay Tayo"
- Country of origin: Philippines
- No. of episodes: 69

Production
- Production locations: Lawiswis Kawayan Garden Resort & Spa, Calumpit, Bulacan (Fitness camp)

Original release
- Network: ABS-CBN
- Release: February 3 – April 26, 2014

Related
- Season 1 (2011)

The Biggest Loser Pinoy Edition: Doubles was a Philippine reality television currently airing on ABS-CBN. The show was the second season of The Biggest Loser Pinoy Edition which was based on the Biggest Loser franchise of the United States. It is hosted by Iza Calzado, replacing season one host Sharon Cuneta. Joining Calzado are Matteo Guidicelli and Robi Domingo who replaced the season one gamemaster Derek Ramsay, and are taking the helm of the show's challenge masters. Domingo also served as the show's social media correspondent. Jim Saret returned as one of the professional trainers. However, Chinggay Andrada did not return for this season and was replaced by Toni Saret, the wife of Jim Saret.

The second season was initially set for a March 2013 premiere, but was later moved to January 2014. The show started airing on February 3, 2014 and airs Mondays to Saturdays. Also, a primer showcasing the stories of selected contestants was aired on February 1, 2014.

It ended on April 26, 2014, with Bryan Castillo declared as the winner.

== Development ==
It was announced during the finale of the first season that ABS-CBN will produce a second season, this time in a Doubles format. On November 22, 2011, Sharon Cuneta signed an exclusive contract deal to ABS-CBN's rival network, TV5. Signing the contract deal with TV5 meant that she will be leaving The Biggest Loser Pinoy Edition too. Derek Ramsay coincidentally followed suit to Cuneta, who also signed an exclusive contract deal with TV5.

In January 2012, Iza Calzado left GMA Network, and signed a 3 year-exclusive contract with ABS-CBN. Part of her contract was hosting the second season of the franchise replacing Cuneta. In March 2013, Matteo Guidicelli was announced to replace Derek Ramsay. Robi Domingo also joined the cast as one of the gamemasters.

== Auditions ==
Cities where the auditions were held.

Auditionees must be 18 to 45 years old in order to qualify; Females must weigh at least 200 pounds, while males must be at least 250 pounds. Auditionees must audition by pairs. Pairs must have pre-existing relationships in order to qualify for the auditions.

Auditions took place in the following locations:

Date	Venue	City
June 13, 2012	Pacific Mall Metro Mandaue	Mandaue, Cebu
June 20, 2012	Oceana Events Place and Restaurant, SM Mall of Asia	Bay City, Pasay, Metro Manila
July 2, 2012	CSI Mall	Dagupan, Pangasinan
July 7, 2012	SM City Batangas	Batangas City, Batangas
July 28, 2012	Abreeza Mall	Davao City

== Prizes ==
The winner of the competition will win ₱1,000,000.00, an appliance showcase, ₱100,000.00 worth of Toby Sports' merchandise, a lifetime Gold's Gym membership, and a kitchen showcase.

== Twists ==
- Pre Camp 30-Day Challenge – All pairs had to undergo a weight loss program for 30 days outside the camp. The top ten pairs with the biggest weight percentages will advance to the next stage of the competition.
- No Fitness Gym – This is the first season and the first franchise of The Biggest Loser to have no fitness gym in its weight loss program.
- Tawid Timbangan Card – Earned as a reward from a major challenge. The card can be used only in a weigh-in elimination whenever a pair feels that they are in the brink of being eliminated.
- Individuals Elimination – Starting Week 10, every pair who will fall under the yellow line will have to decide between themselves as to whom they will put in the elimination. The other non-selected person will be safe from the elimination.
- Double Prizes – When a pair will reach the finale, each individual prize will be doubled.

== Contestants ==
At the start of The Biggest Loser Pinoy Edition: Doubles, the show introduced 14 pairs of two obese contestants with preexisting relationships.

Contestant	Pre-camp	Week 1	Week 3	Week 4	Finish	Total votes^{1}	Source
Chrisfer ?, Davao City	Blue Team				Eliminated (Pre-Camp)	0	
Chesfer ?, Davao City	Blue Team				Eliminated (Pre-Camp)	0	
Benzi 31, Mandaluyong	Violet Team				Eliminated (Pre-Camp)	0	
Ysai 27, Mandaluyong	Violet Team				Eliminated (Pre-Camp)	0	
Cherry 28, ?	Yellow Team				Eliminated (Pre-Camp)	0	
Randall 28, Las Piñas	Yellow Team				Eliminated (Pre-Camp)	0	
Niña Nebreja 20, Zaragoza, Nueva Ecija	Light Green Team				Eliminated (Pre-Camp)	0	
Andrew Mavrides 27, Pasig	Black Team				Quit (Pre-Camp)	0	
Dianne Obsina 23, Makati	Green Team	Green Team			1st Pair; Eliminated (Week 2)	7	
Tin Obsina 22, Makati	Green Team	Green Team			1st Pair; Eliminated (Week 2)	7	
Biggie Estrella 26, ?	Maroon Team	Maroon Team			2nd Pair; Eliminated (Week 3)	4	
Valerie Obena 24, ?	Maroon Team	Maroon Team			2nd Pair; Eliminated (Week 3)	4	
Lovely Si 25, Davao City	Brown Team	Brown Team	Team Jim		3rd Pair; Eliminated (Week 4)	4	
Carol Labilidas 36, Davao City	Brown Team	Brown Team	Team Jim		3rd Pair; Eliminated (Week 4)	4	
Bien Ybañez 31, Cebu City	Pink Team	Pink Team	Team Toni	Pink Team	4th Pair; Eliminated (Week 6)	3	
Mai Letigio 27, Cebu City	Pink Team	Pink Team	Team Toni	Pink Team	4th Pair; Eliminated (Week 6)	3	
Tristan Nueva 38, Cavite City, Cavite	Light Blue Team	Light Blue Team	Team Toni	Light Blue Team	5th Pair; Eliminated (Week 9)	0	
Jepoy Arcilla 37, Tanza, Cavite	Light Blue Team	Light Blue Team	Team Toni	Light Blue Team	5th Pair; Eliminated (Week 9)	0	
Carl Lazaro Returned on Week 13	Orange Team	Orange Team	Team Jim	Orange Team	11th Individual; Eliminated (Week 10)	2	
Francis Asis Returned on Week 13	Black Team	Black Team	Team Toni	Black Team	12th Individual; Eliminated (Week 11)	1	
Ralph Du 22, ?	Silver Team	Silver Team	Team Jim	Silver Team	Quit (Week 12)^{2}	0	
Christian Du 24, ?	Silver Team	Silver Team	Team Jim	Silver Team	Quit (Week 12)^{2}	0	
Pat Martinez 26, Quezon City	Lavender Team	Lavender Team	Team Toni	Lavender Team	Quit (Week 12)^{2}	0	
Cathy Bautista 16, Bacoor, Cavite	Lavender Team	Lavender Team	Team Toni	Lavender Team	Quit (Week 12)^{2}	0	
Ikya Castillo 26, Makati	Red Team	Red Team	Team Jim	Red Team	15th Individual; Eliminated (Week 13)	1	
Carl Lazaro 36, Valenzuela City	Orange Team	Orange Team	Team Jim	Orange Team	16th Individual; Eliminated (Week 14)	1	
Osie Nebreja 45, Zaragoza, Nueva Ecija	Light Green Team	Black Team	Team Toni	Black Team	Fourth place 47.50%	0	
Francis Asis 21, Quezon City	Black Team	Black Team	Team Toni	Black Team	Third place 48.85%	0	
Kayen Lazaro 35, Valenzuela City	Orange Team	Orange Team	Team Jim	Orange Team	Runner-up; 50.52%	0	
Bryan Castillo 22, Makati	Red Team	Red Team	Team Jim	Red Team	Winner; 52.56%	0	

Notes

1. Total votes counts only votes that are revealed at elimination. The total does not count unrevealed votes (if the contestant has already received the required number of votes needed to be eliminated).
2. Decided to quit after the production team discovered that the Du Brothers, and the Showbiz Royalties brought cigarettes and prohibited items inside the camp.

== Challenges ==
=== Pair challenges ===
==== Pre-camp ====
Weeks	Challenge	Admitted to Camp	Eliminated
Weeks 1–4	Pre-camp Challenge; All pairs had to undergo a weight loss program for 30 days outside the camp. The top ten pairs with the biggest weight percentages will earn their spots as the official contestants of the show and will be admitted to the camp. However, the four lowest pairs with combined weiggh-in results are automatically eliminated.	Dianne & Tin, Carl & Kayen, Tristan & Jepoy, Bien & Mai, Bryan & Ikya, Biggie & Valerie, Ralph & Christian, Lovely & Carol,, Pat & Cathy, Francis, & Osie	Chrisfer & Chesfer, Benzi & Ysai, Cherry & Randall, Andrew, & Niña

==== Inside the camp ====
The following are the major challenges done inside the camp:

Week	Challenge	Winners	Losers
Week 1	Pukpok Palayok (Claypot Hitting) Challenge; By draw lots, pairs had to pick a challenge by breaking a piñata claypot. All challenges are timed, where-in the top two pairs who finished their respective challenges fast wins a special exercise activity with two sport celebrities (Gretchen Ho and Rio de la Cruz). While the losing pairs are required to wake up early to do the grocery at the local public market.	Ralph & Christian, Dianne & Tin, Bryan & Ikya, Pat & Cathy	Biggie & Valerie, Francis, & Osie, Lovely & Carol, Bien & Mai, Jepoy, Carl & Kayen
Week 2	Raise That Tube Challenge; All pairs need to carry a 10-pound tube head up high above a yellow line marking as long as they could. When a tube taps the yellow line, the pair will be automatically be eliminated from the challenge. The reward for this challenge is a Tawid Timbangan Card that will help save them from a weigh-in elimination.	Bryan & Ikya	Bien & Mai, Francis, & Osie, Ralph & Christian, Biggie & Valerie, Jepoy, Dianne & Tin, Carl & Kayen, Lovely & Carol, Pat & Cathy
Week 3	Rope Challenge; Contestants who are assigned as students had to untangle ropes while being blindfolded. Only their partners, who are assigned as teachers, will be able to guide them. The pair who will have the longest time in finishing the challenge are penalized to switch roles (Note that only students' weigh-in results will only be counted in the week's elimination), while the fastest pair to finish will receive a 3-pound advantage in the elimination.	Tristan & Jepoy (won 3 lb advantage), Francis, & Osie, Ralph & Christian, Biggie & Valerie, Bien & Mai, Carl & Kayen, Lovely & Carol, Pat & Cathy	Bryan & Ikya (penalized)
Week 6	Walang Ayawan sa Sayawan (No One Will Say No When it Comes to Dancing) Challenge; Contestants will have to participate a dance challenge within themselves using dance steps taught by Thau Reyes. Each contestants can only make two mistakes. Each mistake is equivalent one sticker. Once they will incur two stickers, they will be immediately be removed from the challenge. The last three remaining contestants will have the chance to meet their loved ones.	Pat, Bryan, Ralph	Cathy, Ikya, Christian, Tristan & Jepoy, Francis, & Osie, Bien & Mai, Carl & Kayen
Week 6	Dance Off Challenge; Pairs will battle into a dance off challenge. There will be two dance categories: Hiphop (Participating pairs are from dance coach Joshua Zamora's group), and Ballroom dance (Pairs from dance coach Maribeth Bichara's group). There will be one winner per category. The winning pairs will receive a chance to meet their loved ones, or a two-pound advantage in the coming competitive weigh-in.	Pat & Cathy (Hiphop category; picked the two pound advantage) Bien & Mai (Ballroom dance category; picked chance to meet loved ones)	Ralph & Christian, Tristan & Jepoy, Bryan & Ikya Francis & Osie, Carl & Kayen
Week 7	Bigat na Nabawas, Buhat Hanggang Wakas (Weight Lost, Carried Until The End) Challenge; Pairs need to carry a box attached to ropes end to end. From time to time, a pound will be added to increase the weight of the box. The last standing team will win an exclusive Gym Pass.	Tristan & Jepoy	Ralph & Christian, Carl & Kayen, Bryan & Ikya, Francis & Osie; Pat & Cathy
Week 10	Balanced Diet Challenge; Pairs will have to flip their Biggest Loser Coins in order to determine which of them will have to face the challenge. After the flipping the coins, each representative will have to cross narrow platform placed inside a pool to get a coin. Upon getting the coin, they will have to cross the platform and stick it to a board of pictures that they have to determine which of the pictures will represent a balance diet. Once the representative have stuck the coin on the picture, he/she will cross the narrow platform to repeat the process. After selecting ten pictures, he/she will cross the platform again to pull the lever that will correct his/her answers. After pulling the lever, a buzzer will determine if they have answered the challenge wrong. If his/her answers are wrong, the other pair will have to eat a chocolate coin equivalent to the number of their mistakes.	Pat & Cathy	Ralph & Christian, Carl & Kayen, Bryan & Ikya, Francis & Osie
Week 10	Piso-bilities Challenge; One in every pair needs to hold and balance a tray. Time by time, the other member will have to add one peso coins to the tray without dropping the tray or the dropping the coins of the tray. The last person to hold the tray wins the challenge. Also, as a reward, every one peso added in the tray is equivalent to one hundred pesos wherein they can win a maximum of fifty thousand pesos.	Ralph & Christian (won P50,000)	Carl & Kayen, Bryan & Ikya, Francis & Osie, Pat & Cathy
Week 13	Ice Challenge; In the challenge, one of each team has two fill a foam with water in drums that were lighted randomly as green. After filling their foams, they have to extract the water from the foam to a bucket hanged in a pulley system. Their partners in the other end of the challenge area had to pull the bucket to their place using the pulley. They have to transfer the water-filled bucket to their own buckets, and pour and melt a block of ice which contained their "pair flag." They have to repeat this until one of the pairs had removed their flags from the block of ice and hoisted it in their respective flag poles. The winning pairs will win a family spa vacation, a two-pound advantage, and free special "diet food plan" until the finale.	Bryan & Ikya	Carl & Kayen, Francis & Osie

==== Outside the camp ====
The following are the major challenges done outside the camp:

Week	Challenge	Winners	Losers
Week 1	The Jeepney Pull Challenge; All pairs were brought to Air Force City in Angeles City. Each pair was then required to pull a jeepney to a finish line. But before they will reach the finish line, the pairs must finish two tasks: stack several pieces of jeepney tires, and reach the checkpoint and do a 10 burpee repetitions. The top three pairs received one of the rewards: Pangkabuhayan (Livelihood), Pangkalusugan (For the health), and Pangrelax (For relaxing). The last pair to finish the challenge will receive a penalty (Need to earn an income boundary of 600 pesos from driving a jeepney in order for them to get back to their weight loss routine).	Carl & Kayen (Pangkalusugan), Bryan & Ikya (Pangkalusugan), Biggie & Valerie (Pangrelax)	Dianne & Tin, Francis, & Osie, Ralph & Christian, Lovely & Carol, Pat & Cathy, Bien & Mai (penalized)
Week 13	Boat Challenge; The challenge was held in Sangley Point, Cavite. In the challenge, each female per pair needs to swim from Point A to Point B. At point B, they need to untangle the paddle. Once they have retrieved the paddle, they need to swim back to Point A and paddle all the way to the shore to tag their partners. After tagging their male partners, the males need to find the key that will unlock another paddle by looking for it in a rope bed. The winning pair will win a two-pound advantage.	Carl & Kayen	Bryan & Ikya, Francis & Osie
Week 14	Mt. Pinatubo Challenge; The contestants were brought to the starting point of the trekking trail of Mount Pinatubo. In the challenge, each individual had to carry a bag weighing the pounds they lost during the competition while trekking the 7 kilometer trail to the crater of Mt. Pinatubo. The terrain that they will be encountering will be steep, rocky, and dusty; they will also be crossing rivers. Within the trail, there will be a total of 11 stations which will represent the 11 weigh-in competitions. Per station they will drop a small bag that will represent their weight loss per weigh-in. The contestants will be given 5 hours to finish the challenge. The individual or pair that will finish the challenge with the fastest time will win 30 thousand pesos, with the second and third places winning 20 and 10 thousand pesos, respectively.	Bryan (first)	Carl & Kayen (second), Francis & Osie (third)

=== Team challenges ===
Week	Challenge		Team Toni	Team Jim
Team Toni vs Team Jim Week
Week 4	Team Toni vs. Team Jim Challenge Week; Coaches Toni & Jim had undergone a challenge in order to pick their respective pair members. Toni picked her members first. The remaining non-picked contestants went to Jim.	First Challenge: Tire Challenge; Teams had to circle a certain path in the covered courts using five tires. After reaching back the starting line, they have to put all the tires in a tennis court pole. The winning team will own the covered courts for a week.	Lose	Win
Week 4	Team Toni vs. Team Jim Challenge Week; Coaches Toni & Jim had undergone a challenge in order to pick their respective pair members. Toni picked her members first. The remaining non-picked contestants went to Jim.	Second Challenge: Escalator Challenge; Three contestants per team had to walk against the direction of the escalator without reaching the danger zone (end of the escalator). Every time a contestant reached the danger zone, he must immediately be replaced by another teammate. The last standing team will win a 2-pound advantage in the third weigh-in night, and the participating members per team will divide 30 thousand pesos.	Lose	Win
All contestants
Week 5	70 Lbs. Challenge; All contestants have to lose an accumulated weight of 70 lbs. If they will lose 70 lbs., the yellow line will be removed from the boards, there will be no elimination night, and they will be awarded with a 70s themed party. If not, they the yellow line will be reinstated and the elimination will continue.		Win	
Week 5	Slide and Splash Challenge; All contestants have to slide and splash to fill a five-gallon container within an hour. For completing the challenge, all contestants will have a zumba session at a Gold's Gym. Failure to complete the challenge means only half of the contestants will attend the zumba session.		Win	
Du Brothers versus All Pairs Week
Week 11	Challenge		Du Brothers	All Pairs
Week 11	Bawas Timbang (Lose Weight) Challenge; This week, it's the Du Brothers versus the remaining contestants. In this challenge teams had to collect bottles (that are equivalent to certain amount of pounds) by crossing over an obstacle and reach a pen filled with mud. The team that can collect the most bottles wins. The challenge for the Du Brothers is that if they will win, they can sit out one pair that can they think that can lose much weight in the upcoming weigh-in. For the remaining contestants, if they win they can sit out one member of the Du Brothers in the weigh-in.		Win	Lose
Millers versus Fishers Week
Week 12	Challenge		Millers	Fishers
Week 12	Boat Challenge two members of each two teams, the Millers (composed of Ralph & Christian, Kayen, and Osie) and the Fishers (composed of (Pat & Cath, and Bryan & Ikya), will have to paddle their way to the end of a fishing ground in order to get a two sets of 100 items, sacks and fish nets. But prior to that, they will have to reach the middle of the challenge area to get a note which will tell how many items will they get. After taking the items, they will have to return to their starting point and tag the other two team members. The first to complete the challenge will win a "last chance workout with the coaches." Also, for winning the challenge, "the thousand pesos per pound" earned during the weigh-in will be doubled, which will be given to their foster families.		Win	Lose

== Weigh-in history ==
=== Weigh-in results ===
Contestant	Pre-camp		Week													Total weight loss	
Contestant	1	4	2	3	4	5	6	7 + 8 and 9		10	11	12	13	14	Finale	(in lbs.)	(in %)
Bryan	293	270	252	**243**	240	235	228	217	198	195	190	182	176	167	139	154	52.56%
Kayen	287	259	237	**226**	224	219	208	204	186	184	177	172	165	164	142	145	50.52%
Francis	305	282	258	250	248	241	235	226	206	202	195	186	183	179	156	149	48.85%
Osie	280	269	253	**249**	246	241	240	227	214	210	203	200	194	187	147	133	47.50%
Carl	280	252	231	227	222	217	210	202	188	186		175	167	161		119	42.50%
Ikya	222	204	198	192	192	184	180	175	166	161	159	155	151			71	31.98%
Ralph	273	247	228	**223**	217	211	203	195	184	178	166	175				98	35.90%
Christian	255	235	218	212	209	204	196	188	175	173	168	172				83	32.55%
Pat	254	236	222	212	208	210	202	197	187	183	176	175				79	31.10%
Cathy	294	276	256	**248**	246	241	233	222	209	207	200	194				100	34.01%
Tristan	307	293	276	269	266	260	253	242	230							77	25.08%
Jepoy	300	282	266	**262**	256	251	246	237	226							74	24.66%
Bien	380	359	345	340	334	328	324									56	14.74%
Mai	248	236	227	**221**	220	216	214									34	13.71%
Lovely	205	197	189	**184**	184											21	10.24%
Carol	216	200	191	185	185											31	14.35%
Biggie	313	285	273	266												47	15.02%
Valerie	227	220	206	**203**												24	10.57%
Dianne	275	260	250													25	9.09%
Tin	203	192	185													18	8.87%
Andrew	286	273														13	4.55%
Cherry	201	194														7	3.48%
Randall	267	258														9	3.37%
Benzi	236	228														8	3.39%
Ysai	188	182														6	3.19%
Niña	278	273														5	1.80%
Chrisfer	283	277														6	2.12%
Chesfer	267	259														8	3.00%

=== Weigh-in difference ===
Contestant	Pre-camp	Week													Total weight loss
Contestant	Pre-camp	2	3	4	5	6	7 + 8 & 9		10	11	12	13	14	Finale	Total weight loss
Bryan	-23	-18	**-9**	-3	-5	-7	-11	-19	-3	-5	-8	-4	-9	-28	154
Kayen	-28	-22	-9	-2	-5	-11	-4	-18	-2	-7	-5	-7	-1	-22	145
Francis	-23	-24	-8	-2	-7	-6	-9	-20	-4	-7	-9	-3	-4	-23	149
Osie	-11	-16	**-4**	-3	-5	-1	-13	-13	-4	-7	-3	-6	-7	-40	133
Carl	-28	-21	**-4**	-5	-5	-7	-8	-14	-2		-11	-8	-6		119
Ikya	-18	-6	-6	0	-8	-4	-5	-9	-5	-2	-4	-6			71
Ralph	-26	-19	**-5**	-6	-6	-8	-8	-11	-6	-12	+9				98
Christian	-20	-17	-6	-3	-5	-8	-8	-13	-2	-5	+4				83
Pat	-18	-14	-8	-4	+2	-8	-5	-10	-2	-7	-1				79
Cathy	-18	-20	**-10**	-2	-5	-8	-11	-13	-4	-7	-6				100
Tristan	-14	-17	-7	-3	-6	-7	-11	-12							77
Jepoy	-18	-16	**-4**	-6	-5	-5	-9	-11							74
Bien	-21	-14	-5	-6	-6	-4									56
Mai	-12	-9	**-6**	-1	-4	-2									34
Lovely	-8	-8	**-5**	0											21
Carol	-16	-9	-6	0											31
Biggie	-28	-12	-7												47
Valerie	-7	-14	**-3**												24
Dianne	-15	-10													25
Tin	-11	-7													18
Andrew	-13														13
Cherry	-7														7
Randall	-9														9
Benzi	-8														8
Ysai	-6														6
Niña	-5														5
Chrisfer	-6														6
Chesfer	-8														8

=== Weigh-in percentage ===
Contestant	Pre-camp	Week													Total weight loss
Contestant	Pre-camp	2	3	4	5	6	7 + 8 & 9		10	11	12	13	14	Finale	Total weight loss
Bryan	-7.85%	-6.67%	**-3.57%**	-1.23%	-2.08%	-2.98%	-4.82%	-8.75%	-1.52%	-2.56%	-4.21%	-2.20%	-5.11%	-16.77%	52.56%
Kayen	-9.76%	-8.49%	-3.80%	-0.88%	-2.23%	-5.02%	-1.92%	-8.82%	-1.08%	-3.80%	-2.82%	-4.07%	-0.61%	-13.41%	50.52%
Francis	-7.54%	-8.51%	-3.10%	-0.80%	-2.82%	-2.49%	-3.83%	-8.85%	-1.94%	-3.47%	-4.62%	-1.61%	-2.19%	-12.85%	48.85%
Osie	-3.93%	-5.95%	**-1.58%**	-1.20%	-2.03%	-0.41%	-5.42%	-5.73%	-1.87%	-3.33%	-1.48%	-3.00%	-3.61%	-21.39%	47.50%
Carl	-10.00%	-8.33%	**-1.76%**	-2.20%	-2.25%	-3.23%	-3.81%	-6.93%	-1.08%		-5.91%	-4.57%	-3.59%		42.50%
Ikya	-8.11%	-2.94%	-3.03%	0.00%	-4.16%	-2.17%	-2.78%	-5.14%	-3.01%	-1.24%	-2.52%	-3.87%			31.98%
Ralph	-9.52%	-7.69%	**-2.19%**	-2.69%	-2.76%	-3.79%	-3.94%	-5.64%	-3.26%	-7.23%	+5.14%				35.90%
Christian	-7.84%	-7.23%	2.75%	-1.42%	-2.39%	-3.92%	-4.08%	-6.91%	-1.14%	-2.89%	+2.38%				32.55%
Pat	-7.09%	-5.93%	-4.50%	-1.89%	+0.96%	-3.81%	-2.48%	-5.08%	-2.14%	-3.83%	-0.57%				31.10%
Cathy	-6.12%	-7.25%	**-3.91%**	-0.81%	-2.03%	-3.32%	-4.72%	-5.86%	-0.96%	-3.38%	-3.00%				34.01%
Tristan	-4.56%	-5.80%	-2.54%	-1.12%	-2.26%	-2.69%	-4.35%	-4.96%							25.08%
Jepoy	-6.00%	-5.67%	**-1.50%**	-2.29%	-1.56%	-1.99%	-3.66%	-4.64%							24.66%
Bien	-5.53%	-3.90%	-1.45%	-1.76%	-1.80%	-1.22%									14.74%
Mai	-4.84%	-3.81%	**-2.64%**	-0.45%	-1.81%	-1.85%									13.71%
Lovely	-3.90%	-4.06%	**-2.65%**	0.00%											10.24%
Carol	-7.41%	-4.50%	-3.14%	0.00%											14.35%
Biggie	-8.95%	-4.21%	-2.56%												15.02%
Valerie	-3.08%	-6.36%	**-1.46%**												10.57%
Dianne	-5.45%	-3.85%													9.09%
Tin	-5.42%	-3.65%													8.87%
Andrew	-4.55%														4.55%
Cherry	-3.48%														3.48%
Randall	-3.37%														3.37%
Benzi	-3.39%														3.39%
Ysai	-3.19%														3.19%
Niña	-1.80%														1.80%
Chrisfer	-2.12%														2.12%
Chesfer	-3.00%														3.00%

Notes

- In Week 3, contestants' weigh-in results that are **bold** indicates results not counted for the elimination. Those in italicized indicates that their results served as the basis for each of the couple's fate in landing in the bottom two.
- In Week 4, contestants' weigh in results that are blue italics are from Team Jim. Those in pink italics are from Team Toni. The goal for that week is to lose weight per team, which Team Toni had won against Team Jim. Team Toni was immune in that elimination night.
- In Week 7, at the end of the weigh-in, it was announced that it was a non-elimination week. However, the Biggest Loser Pairs of the Week were still declared. The weigh-in results from Week 7 were disregarded.
- In Week 8, teams were tasked to go back in their families to challenge their discipline. Due to the challenge, the weight measured in Week 7 will be added for the weigh-in results upon their return to camp at the end of Week 9.
- Starting in Week 10, a pair who will fall below the yellow line will have to decide between themselves in who will face the elimination.
- In Week 10, All contestants faced a weeklong twist where the weight of one of each pairs will only be the basis for their rankings by tossing coins during the elimination night. The contestants weights' that are marked in blue numbers are the ones that served as basis for their weekly ranking.
- In Week 11, the weigh-in results were based on the Du Brothers weigh-in results versus the average weigh-in results of the remaining contestants. If the Du Brother's weigh-in percentage result is greater than the remaining contestants, the last two pairs of the latter group that fell below the yellow line will be marked for elimination. If the weigh-in results will be otherwise, the elimination will be between Ralph & Christian only. Also during the weigh-in, as a reward during the last major challenge, the Du Brothers were able to sit out one pair that they think will lose much weight and can contribute much to the percentage needed by the other team. They chose Pat & Cath.
- In Week 12, the Du Brothers received an immunity after becoming the Biggest Losers in Week 11. During the week's weigh-in, both gained weight. With this, the immunity was removed from them. However, with the revelation that Ralph, Christian, Pat, and Cathy cheated in the competition, the elimination night was cancelled. The two latter pairs decided to quit.
- After 2 pairs quit in Week 12, Francis and Carl joined their double pair. But prior to that, they had to be weighed and had to show that they had loss weight after they were eliminated. Carl loss 11 pounds, while Francis loss 9 pounds earning their places back in the camp.

Color keys

- Week's Biggest Loser(s)
- Immunity after being the Biggest Losers of the previous week
- Used the Tawid Timbangan Card, safe from elimination
- Returning contestants
- Under the yellow line, safe from elimination
- Under the yellow line, for elimination
- Under the red line, saved
- Under the red line, automatically eliminated
- Quit

== Elimination history ==
Contestant	Pre- camp	Week													Total votes received
Contestant	Pre- camp	2	3	4	5	6	7 + 8 & 9		10	11	12	13	14	Finale	Total votes received
Bryan	–	D & T	?		X		B & M	–	X	–	–	–	Carl	Winner	0
Kayen	–	D & T	B & V		L & V		?	–	–	–	–	Ikya	–	Runner-up	0
Francis	–	D & T	?		L & V		X	–	Carl	X	Elim. (Wk. 11)	–	–	Third place	1
Osie	–	D & T	?		L & V		X	–	Carl	–	–	X	X	Fourth place	0
Carl	–	D & T	B & V		L & V		?	–	X	Eliminated (Week 10)		Ikya	X	Elim. (Wk. 14)	3
Ikya	–	D & T	?		X		B & M	–	–	X	–	X	Eliminated (Week 13)		1
Ralph	–	D & T	B & V		?		B & M	–	?	Francis	–	Quit (Week 12)			0
Christian	–	D & T	B & V		?		B & M	–	?	Francis	–	Quit (Week 12)			0
Cathy	–	D & T	B & V		L & V		B & M	–	Carl	–	–	Quit (Week 12)			0
Pat	–	D & T	B & V		L & V		B & M	–	Carl	–	–	Quit (Week 12)			0
Tristan	–	M & B	B & V		?		?	–	Automatically eliminated (Week 9)						0
Jepoy	–	M & B	B & V		?		?	–	Automatically eliminated (Week 9)						0
Bien	–	X	X		L & V	X	Eliminated (Week 6)								3
Mai	–	X	X		L & V	X	Eliminated (Week 6)								3
Lovely	–	D & T	?	X	Eliminated (Week 4)										4
Carol	–	D & T	?	X	Eliminated (Week 4)										4
Biggie	–	D & T	X	Eliminated (Week 3)											4
Valerie	–	D & T	X	Eliminated (Week 3)											4
Dianne	–	X	Eliminated (Week 2)												7
Tin	–	X	Eliminated (Week 2)												7
Andrew	–	Quit													0
Niña	–	Automatically eliminated													0
Cherry	–	Automatically eliminated													0
Randall	–	Automatically eliminated													0
Benzi	–	Automatically eliminated													0
Ysai	–	Automatically eliminated													0
Chrisfer	–	Automatically eliminated													0
Chesfer	–	Automatically eliminated													0
Notes	^{Note} ^{1}	^{Notes} ^{2}^{,}^{3}	^{Notes} ^{2}^{,}^{4}	^{Note} ^{2}	None	^{Note} ^{2}	^{Note} ^{5}		^{Notes} ^{2}^{,}^{6}	^{Notes} ^{2}^{,}^{7}	^{Notes} ^{8}^{,}^{9}	^{Note} ^{2}	None	None	
Eliminated	Niña Cherry & Randall Benzi & Ysai Chrisfer & Chesfer	Dianne & Tin received 7 votes	Biggie & Valerie received 4 votes	Lovely & Carol received 4 votes	None	Bien & Mai received 3 votes	None	Tristan & Jepoy auto. eliminated	Carl received 2 votes	Francis received 1 vote	Cancelled	Ikya received 1 vote	Carl received 1 vote	None	
Quit	Andrew	None									Ralph & Christian Pat & Cathy	None			
References															

Color key

- Winner
- Runners-up
- Immunity
- – Not in elimination, unable to vote
- Valid vote cast
- ? Valid vote cast, vote not revealed
- Non-elimination round
- – In elimination, elimination based on weight results only
- Used the Tawid Timbangan Card, safe from elimination
- X Below yellow line, unable to vote
- – Below yellow line, safe from elimination
- Below red line, saved
- Below red line, automatically eliminated
- Eliminated
- Quit

Pair abbreviations (for pair nominations only)

- D & T — Dianne & Tin
- B & M — Bien & Mai
- B & V — Biggie & Valerie
- L & V — Lovely & Carol

Notes

1. Andrew decided to quit to pursue better career opportunities. Due to this Francis, the latter's partner, was given a new partner from the eliminated contestants. Osie was picked by the production team as Francis' new partner for gaining the highest weight loss percentage among the eliminated contestants.
2. Votes are tallied as by pair, and not as by individual.
3. Biggie & Valerie's, Ralph & Christian's, and Lovely & Carol's vote were not revealed in the first elimination night. However, during the second weigh-in, Bien revealed that only Tristan & Jepoy voted them to be eliminated.
4. Tristan & Jepoy were supposed to be included in the week's bottom two. However, due to their 3-pound advantage they landed third place and was safe from being eliminated.
5. In Week 7, teams were weighed but was later informed that it will be a non-elimination night. Furthermore, they were informed that they will stay outside the camp for two weeks. Upon their return in the camp, they will be weighed in which their weigh-in results will be their gate pass to the camp and the pair that lose the lowest weight results will be automatically be eliminated. Unfortunately, during the weigh-in Tristan & Jepoy placed last where-in they were automatically eliminated.
6. Starting in Week 10, a pair who will fall below the yellow line will have to decide between themselves in who will face the elimination. Votes are still cast as pairs.
7. In Week 10, after Ralph & Christian won the weekly weigh-in challenge they were given the power to vote out one individual from the bottom two individuals.
8. After the weigh-in, Calzado announced that eliminations were cancelled for Ralph & Christian and Pat & Cathy cheated in the competition as seen in the previous weeks camera recordings (for bringing and using prohibited items inside the camp). Due to this, the two pairs decided to quit.
9. With the Du brothers and the Showbiz royalties quitting the competition. Carl and Francis returned to the camp to level the competition.

== Episode summaries ==
=== Pre-camp ===
- Episodes: #1–#6
- Air dates: February 3–8, 2014
- Summary:
  - Episode 1: Iza Calzado introduced the Biggest Loser Team comprising Matteo Guidicelli and Robi Domingo as challenge masters, couple Jim and Toni Saret as the coaches, and herself as coach. The team later moved out to surprise the contestants. Calzado first visited and surprised the Obsina sisters. While the Sarets visited Carl and Kayen.
  - Episode 2: The Biggest Loser Team surprised heavy beauty queens' Benzi and Ysai, mother-daughter tandem Osie and Niña, and former UST Salinggawi Dance Troupe members Cherry and Randall.
  - Episode 3: Friends Tristan and Jepoy, workmates Bien and Mai, and twins Chrisfer and Chesfer were introduced.
  - Episode 4: Siblings Bryan and Ikya, lovers Biggie and Valerie, and brothers Ralph and Christian were introduced.
  - Episode 5: Cousins Lovely and Carol, strangers Francis and Andrew, and showbiz royalties Pat and Cathy were the last group of pairs introduced.
  - Episode 6: All pairs were weighed in Angeles City Flying Club, Angeles City. The top ten pairs were later revealed. Carl & Kayen were proclaimed as the Biggest Loser Pair of the Week.

=== Week 1 & 2 ===
- Episodes: #7–#12, #13–#16
- Air dates: February 10–15 and 17–20, 2014
- Summary:
  - Episode 7: After the final weigh-in, it was revealed that Andrew had to quit the competition because he was offered with a big career opportunity. Due to this, he has to leave Francis alone in the camp. The production team, however, decided to give Francis a new partner coming from the eliminated four pairs who failed to make the cut. The production team chose Osie for having the biggest weight loss difference among the eight eliminated contestants. It was also revealed that the season will become the first season in the franchise and the first in The Biggest Loser franchise history to have not include a gym facility in the camp. All contestants are then required to loss weight without any aid of gym equipments.
  - Episode 8: Tristan left the camp temporarily in order to attend the wake of her father-in-law in the United States. As a consequence to his decision, he must continue losing weight outside of the camp, and must be back before the second weigh-in elimination. Also, a grave condition was also given to Tristan and Jepoy that if they will be under the yellow-line in the upcoming weigh-in elimination, the elimination will be stopped and they will automatically be eliminated. Also in that episode, the pairs (in exception of Jepoy who had to sit out in the challenge) faced their first challenge in the Air Force City, Angeles City. Teams were required to reach a finish line while pulling a jeepney.
  - Episode 9: The airing of the jeepney challenge was continued to be aired. Mai of the officemates team nearly fainted in the challenged and was attended by the medical team due to hypoglycemia. The workmates team were later penalized for not completing the challenge. Carl & Kayen, Bryan and Ikya, and Biggie & Valerie finished top the challenge. For finishing the challenge first, Carl & Kayen were given the privilege to receive a letter from their family, they were also able to give other selected contestants the privilege to receive (Jepoy, Bien & Mai), and write (Bryan & Ikya and the Obsina sisters) letters from their respective families.
  - Episode 10: All pairs participated in the Pukpok Palayok Challenge wherein the top two pairs wins a special exercise sessions with two sports celebrities while the losing pairs were tasked to wake up early to do the grocery at the local public market.
  - Episode 11: The pairs who won the challenge met with Gretchen Ho and Rio de la Cruz. Later on, the contestants were given with presented with a lot of meals for their dinner. Unknown to them, the coaches are secretly spying on them. The coaches observed their unhealthy habits re-emerged. The coaches appeared to them, and reprimanded their eating behaviors. They were then asked to do a stranious exercise in order to show them that burning calories is not an easy task.
  - Episode 12: Pairs had to defeat their time records from the previous challenge. An extra reward for Osie's husband, and Bryan & Ikya's mother plus a short time with their respective love ones will be given upon all contestants will be able to set a new time record in their respective tasks. Furthermore, every pair who will be able to set a new record will also be given a special spa session. At the end of the challenge, only Pat & Cathy had failed to set a new record. With this, Domingo asked the contestants to choose whom between Osie, and Bryan & Ikya will have the chance to meet their loved ones. The contestants chose Bryan & Ikya. Bryan & Ikya later departed the camp to visit their mother and brought her a washing machine, part of the reward for the contestants finishing the challenge. Osie's husband was also able to receive a mountain bike brought to him by the production team of the show.
  - Episode 13: Teams faced their third major challenge wherein pairs have to raise a steel bar over a yellow line. The pair who fails to maintain to raise the bar, when the bar touches the yellow line, or when they decided to quit they will be automatically be eliminated from the challenge.
  - Episode 14: The third challenge ended with Byran & Ikya winning the Tawid Timbangan Card. Afterwards, the fitness coaches asked the teams to go out the camp and ask the locals for some household items they need for their last major workout before the first weigh-in elimination. During their last work out prior the weigh-in, Tristan (Jepoy's partner) arrived from the United States.
  - Episode 15: The first weigh-in elimination took place with Main & Bien, and Dianne & Tin falling the yellow line, marking them for elimination. Carl & Kayen were again proclaimed as the Biggest Loser Pair of the Week.
  - Episode 16: First elimination night. Dianne & Tin were eliminated after receiving four votes against Mai & Bien who received one vote. For being the Biggest Losers of the Week, Carl & Kayen received a special reward — the practice writings of their young and only son. After the elimination, Iza Calzado called all pairs for a short challenge. Each person had to step forward if they feel they are the person being described by Calzado. In each pair, the person with the most steps were assigned as students, while the least were assigned as teachers. The challenge for these assigned roles is that only the students' weigh-in results will serve as the basis for the upcoming weigh-in elimination.

=== Week 3 ===
- Episodes: #17–#20
- Air dates: February 21–22, 24–25, 2014
- Summary:
  - Episode 17: Couples faced their first temptation challenge, a cart of street foods. The cart consists of ginataang monggo, kikiams, and fried lumpias. The temptation is they can earn 30 thousand pesos if they will eat three bowls of ginataang monggo, 9 sticks of kikiam, and 6 pieces of fried lumpia. At the first call, no one took the temptation challenge. At the second call, the price was raised to 60 thousand pesos but still no one took the temptation challenge.
  - Episode 18: Pairs was called for their fourth challenge: the untangle the rope challenge. The challenge each student had to untangle the rope while being blindfolded, and guided by their respective partners. Fastest team to finish will receive a 3-pound advantage, while the slowest will be penalized and have to switch roles with their partners.
  - Episode 19: The untangle the rope challenge was continued. At the end of the challenge, Tristan & Jepoy were declared the fastest pairs, while Bryan & Ikya penalized for finishing last.
  - Episode 20: Second weigh-in elimination night. Pat & Cathy were declared the Biggest Loser Pair of the Week, while Bien & Mai (for the second consecutive week) and Valerie & Biggie landed in the bottom two for losing the lowest weigh-in results.

=== Week 4 ===
- Episodes: #21–#24
- Air dates: February 26–March 1, 2014
- Summary:
  - Episode 21: Elimination results were revealed with Valerie & Biggie eliminated from the show. Later on after the elimination, teams were divided into two. Toni picked her team members first after winning an exercise challenge. It was revealed that the next weigh-in will be by team. The team who had lost much weight will be immune from the elimination. The losing team, on the other hand, will face the elimination with the two pairs who had loss less weight than the rest of their team placed in the bottom two. After the coaches picked their team members, the teams faced another challenge. Teams had to circle half of the covered court by only using five tires as their platforms. Coach Jim's team won the challenge. As a reward, they will be the only team to occupy the cover courts for the whole week.
  - Episode 22: Teams were pushed to their limits after each of the coaches gave them intense exercises. After the exercise, the teams proceeded into an undisclosed mall for their next challenge: the escalator challenge. Teams of three had to walk against the direction of the escalator. Every time a team member reaches the bottom end of the elevator, he/she must immediately be replaced by one of his teammates. The challenge was won by the coach Jim's team, winning a two-pound advantage for the third weigh-in and thirty thousand pesos.
  - Episode 23: Team Toni brought her team to undisclosed dance studio in Quezon City. She decided to release the things the contestants thought are burden to them and why did they let themselves get fat. Later on, after that emotional release, the team continued to their last chance work out before the third weigh-in. Team Jim also did a last chance workout. After both teams' last chance workout, they met Calzado for their third weigh-in. At the start of the weigh-in, Calzado reminded the contestants that the team's bottom two who lost less weight will face the elimination. Later on, both teams were weighed except for Bien.
  - Episode 24: Bien lost 6 pounds enough for his teammates to be safe from the elimination. It was also revealed that Ralph & Christian were the Biggest Loser Pair of the Week. Later that night, the contestants decided to vote out Lovely & Carol over Bryan & Ikya. The day after, the contestants were brought to undisclosed pool resort where they did their challenge: slide and splash challenge. All contestants had to slide and splash into a pool to fill a five-gallon container within an hour. The contestants finished the task under 50 minutes and won a reward of zumba session at a Gold's Gym. After the zumba session, Domingo called the Du brothers to give them their reward for being the Biggest Loser Pair of the Week. Their reward was a day with their little sister in the pool resort where they did their slide and splash challenge. They were also able to bring another pair (the Du brothers chose Pat & Cathy) to accompany with them in the resort.

=== Week 5 ===
- Episode: #25
- Air date: March 3, 2014
- Summary:
  - Episode 25: All contestants had undergone for their last chance workout before the weigh-in. After the workout Guadecilli, instead of Calzado, welcomed the contestants for their fourth competitive weigh-in. They were reminded that all of them have to lose a cumulative weight of 70 lbs. or at least 5 lbs. per contestant and with this no one will be eliminated. If not, they will proceed with the elimination. Carl & Kayen were first to be weighed of each lost 5 lbs. After several other pairs, Cathy & Pat stepped into their respective weighing scale with Cathy first being weighed. She lost 5 lbs. When it was Pat's turn, Pat said that she was not confident that she had lost any weight and instead she felt that was bloated and had gained weight despite the intense workout. When Pat was weighed, it was confirmed that she indeed gained weight of 2 pounds. However, the 70 lbs. weight loss was reached after Ikya lost 8 lbs. enough for them to achieve the 70 lb. weight loss goal. They were given a 70s themed party as a reward.

=== Week 6 ===
- Episode: #26–#29
- Air date: March 4–7, 2014
- Summary:
  - Episode 26: At the start of the episode, Domingo brought a box of the old clothes previously worn by the contestants prior to being admitted to the camp. All of them noticed changes in their physical appearance after they worn again their respective old clothing. Afterwards, the camp experienced heavy rainfall. Unknown to them, most of Luzon was affected by Tropical Storm Maring. The contestants were then permitted to call their families in order for them to know their current conditions. Night had visited the camp and with this, Calzado visited them to announce their next challenge: Walang Ayawan sa Sayawan Challenge. Calzado also brought Joshua Zamora of the Maneuvers and Maribeth Bichara as their dance coaches. The contestants were also then divided into two groups: Francis & Osie, Mai & Bien, and Ikya & Bryan went to Maribeth Bichara while the remaining pairs went to Joshua Zamora. Later that night, Thau Reyes visited the contestants to teach them few dance moves named after the hosts and coaches of the show. After the short dance session, the contestants were informed that they will be doing a dance contest wherein the best three contestants will have a chance to meet their loved ones.
  - Episode 27: Bryan & Ikya were brought to ABS-CBN Broadcasting Complex to see It's Showtime! live. Bryan was given eyeglasses by Vhong Navarro after the show. Back in the camp, pairs continued their practice for the dance off challenge.
  - Episode 28: Dance challenge day. All teams participated in the hiphop and ballroom dance categories. At the end of the competition, Pat & Cathy were declared as winners of the hiphop category, and Bien & Mai for the ballroom dance category. Also, Pat & Cathy decided to get the two pound advantage as their reward, while Bien & Mai decided to have the time to meet their loved ones.
  - Episode 29: Fifth competitive weigh-in and elimination night. Carl & Kayen were declared, once again, as the Biggest Losers of the Week. On the other hand, Francis & Osie, and Bien & Mai fell under the yellow line. The latter was eliminated after receiving three votes.

=== Week 7 ===
- Episode: #30–#32
- Air date: March 8 and 10–11, 2014
- Summary:
  - Episode 30: Pairs faced their weekly challenge wherein they have to carry a heavy box that they have to carry using ropes end to end. The box will become a pound heavier from time to time until the last pair standing wins. Tristan & Jepoy won the challenge and received a Gym Pass.
  - Episode 31: All the contestants received a makeover for a short film created for them. The film was about their previous lives before they started the camp and the changes they have made during the show.
  - Episode 32: Sixth competitive weigh-in. All pairs were weighed with Francis & Osie declared as the Biggest Losers of the Week. Pat & Cathy together with Carl & Kayen fell below the yellow line. However, in a twist Calzado announced that this week will be a non-elimination week. Also Calzado announced that for the next week, all pairs had to go back to their families for two weeks in order to challenge their discipline. All the results in this weigh-in were disregarded. As part of being the Biggest Losers of the Week, Bryan & Osie will only be the pairs to be coached by coaches Jim and Toni during their stay outside the camp.

=== Week 8 & 9 ===
- Episode: #33–#37
- Air date: March 12–15 and 17, 2014
- Summary:
  - Episode 33: Pat & Cathy, Tristan & Jepoy, and Christian & Ralph returned to their respective homes, surprising their loved ones.
  - Episode 34: Bryan & Ikya, and Francis & Osie returned to their homes. Osie's two daughters, with the aid of the two coaches and accompanied by Francis, faced the exercises that their mother was doing inside the camp. Midway the episode, Pat & Cathy and Christian & Ralph went out together in order to work-out.
  - Episode 35: All contestants, except Tristan, attended a dance session with their nutrition coach, Nadine Tengco.
  - Episode 36: Contestants, the hosts, and the coaches participated in the show's first half marathon. Christian finished the race first, while Francis & Osie finished last.
  - Episode 37: Pairs were picked up in their respective homes in order to return to the camp. Upon their entry in the camp, each pairs were weighed. The lowest pair, Tristan & Jepoy, fell under the red line thereby earning an automatic elimination. The Biggest Losers of the Week was, for the second consecutive time, Francis & Osie. During the weigh-in, Kayen was the first contestant to lose more than 100 pounds.

=== Week 10 ===
- Episode: #38–#41
- Air date: March 18–21, 2014
- Summary:
  - Episode 38: Pairs had undergone exercises with the coaches after temporarily leaving the camp. They were given also some equipments, provided by Toby's Sports, to use for their exercises. Also, Francis & Osie received a date with their special loved ones, a reward they earned after they won as the Biggest Losers of the Week last weigh-in.
  - Episode 39: Pairs faced their second major challenge for the week wherein one person in each pair needs to balance a tray. Coins will be added in the tray by the other person in the pair. The last pair standing wins the challenge and a monetary reward (see challenge section for more information). The challenge was won by Ralph & Christian. They also receive 50 thousand pesos for balancing 500 one peso coins. Afterwards, the pairs were visited by Francisco Colayco, an expert financial adviser, giving them tips in handling their finances.
  - Episode 40: Ralph & Christian's dad, known by the two as a strict person when it comes to being health conscious, visited the camp to become a special trainer for the night.
  - Episode 41: Elimination night. Contestants had to flip a coin to determine which one of each in the pair's weight will serve as a basis for their ranking. Ralph & Christian became the Biggest Losers of the Week after Ralph gained the highest weight loss percentage. On the other hand, Carl & Kayen and Bryan & Ikya fell under the yellow line. As part of the new elimination process, Carl and Bryan decided to face the elimination. Carl was sent home after receiving two votes. A day after the elimination, contestants were split into two groups for a special challenged tailored by one of the show's sponsors, C-Lium Fiber. Teams were divided under two pair leaders, one group from the Du brother team, and the Showbiz Celebrities team. In the challenge, teams had to cook healthy dishes and had to incorporate the C-Lium Fiber as an ingredient to their dishes. The challenge was judged by coach Jim, the C-Lium Fiber endorser and actor Richard Yap, and the show's nutrition coach Nadine Tengco. The team led by the Du brothers (other members consists of Francis & Osie, and Kayen) won the challenge winning each of the members a year-long supply of C-Lium.

=== Week 11 ===
- Episode: #42–#46
- Air date: March 22–28, 2014
- Summary:
  - Episode 42: Contestants faced a fake elimination wherein Ralph & Christian received the most votes and was supposedly eliminated. In a surprising twist, Calzado revealed that the contestants voted Ralph & Christian will be challenged to lose the most weight against all the remaining contestants.
  - Episode 43: The contestants faced their tenth major challenge. The challenge was to collect the most bottles in thirty minutes. The challenge was won by Ralph & Christian. As a reward, they can sit out one pair that they think a threat to them in the upcoming weigh-in. Also, a special reward was given to them. The reward was they have to choose a "Short Term" or a "Long Term" reward. They picked the Long Term reward which was an immunity in the tenth weigh-in.
  - Episode 44: The teams were invited to the mess hall. There, they met Domingo who invited them to do the Temptation Challenge. The temptation challenge was about a team eating the most Chicharon. The team that ate the most Chicharon plates will win a 2-pound advantage. Ralph & Christian ate 15 plates while the team composed of the remaining contestants ate none. With this, the Du brothers won the 2 pound advantage. After the temptation challenge, all teams continued with their exercise routines.
  - Episode 45: The Du Brothers won the weigh-in challenge and was also declared as the Week's Biggest Losers. With the "All" team losing the weigh-in challenge, Francis & Osie, and Bryan & Ikya fell below the yellow line and were marked for elimination.
  - Episode 46: As part of winning the weigh-in challenge, the Du Brothers were given powers on whom they will eliminate. Francis & Osie decided that Francis will face the elimination for the later felt that Osie still needs more time for her to stay in the camp and felt that she needs the prize more than him. Bryan & Ikya decided that they have to go with who loss weight less (Ikya). In the elimination area, Ralph & Christian decided to give the vote to Francis. The day after, Calzado met them and introduced their next challenge for Week 12 in which they will be working outside the camp and work like the less-paid individuals. The contestants were divided into two groups: Ralph & Christian, Kayen and Osie who will work in a rice warehouse, and Bryan & Ikya and Pat & Cathy who will work in a fishery.

=== Week 12 ===
- Episode: #47–#53
- Air date: March 29 and 31, April 1–5, 2014
- Summary:
  - Episode 47: Each team started working on their new jobs while helping their foster families. Calzado visited each team and told them that each weight pound loss in the weigh-in will be equivalent to one thousand pesos that will be handed over to their foster families.
  - Episode 48–50: Teams continued their jobs.
  - Episode 51: Teams participated in their weekly challenge (see Challenges section for details).
  - Episode 52: After the weekly immersion and their weekly challenge, all contestants came back to the camp for the weigh-in. In the weigh-in, their foster families visited them and watched the weigh-in. The fish port team was the first team to be weighed and lose 18 pounds. The rice milling team was the second team to be weighed. Du brothers, who had an immunity, gained weight. Due to this, their immunity was taken to them. Osie and Kayen came in next to them and loss 8 pounds. At the end of the weigh-in, Bryan & Ikya were proclaimed as the Biggest Losers of the Week, while Osie and the Du brothers fell below the yellow line. After their foster families left the camp, Iza Calzado gave an unexpected announcement. Calzado told the contestants that the elimination will be temporarily stopped.
  - Episode 53: It was then revealed that Pat & Cathy, and Ralph & Christian cheated in the competition. The said contestants brought "outside" items and groceries that are prohibited in the camp such as junk food, dietary supplements, laxatives, and cigarettes. With their grave violations, both pairs decided to quit and end their stints in the competition.

=== Week 13 ===
- Episode: No. 54 – No. 62
- Air date: April 7–12 and 14–16, 2014
- Summary:
  - Episode 54: Francis and Carl return to the camp, replacing the two teams who left the show in Week 12.
  - Episode 55: Robi Domingo calls the remaining contestants to the garden for a challenge called Tarantapak Challenge. They have to step onto a semi-liquid material and had to continue stepping on it until they sink. They were also asked to challenge Alan Chuachuy, a contestant from the first season. The challenge was won by Francis and had also beaten Chuachuy. Later that night, the contestants continue their exercises with the said former contestant.
  - Episode 56: Episode 53 was replayed.
  - Episode 57: Ikya and Bryan received three thousand worth of gift checks from Toby Sports after they were hailed as the Biggest Losers of Week 12. Meanwhile, Francis and Osie received a Gold's Gym session after Francis won the challenge against all the contestants and Chuachuy. Afterwards, all pairs were brought to the challenge area for their next challenge. In the challenge, one of each team has two fill a foam with water in drums that were lighted randomly as green. After filling their foams, they have to extract the water from the foam to a bucket hanged in a pulley system. Their partners in the other end of the challenge area had to pull the bucket to their place using the pulley. They have to transfer the water-filled bucket to their own buckets, and pour and melt a block of ice which contained their "pair flag." They have to repeat this until one of the pairs had removed their flags from the block of ice and hoisted it in their respective flag poles. The challenge was won by Bryan and Ikya. They have won a spa vacation with their family, a two-pound advantage, and a free "diet food plan" until the finale. The next day, all contestants were brought to Manila Bay via a special yacht provided for them. They were surprise after the Philippine Navy SEAL took them for a surprise rigorous military training.
  - Episode 58: Start of the "Hell Week" training in a military camp. The contestant faced a surprise rigorous and stressful with the Philippine Navy SEAL in Sangley Point, Cavite.
  - Episode 59: Contestants faced strenuous military tasks and exercises.
  - Episode 60: Contestants continued being trained at the Navy camp. Due to stress, Bryan was sent to the hospital.
  - Episode 61: Contestants face their second to the last major challenge (see challenges section for details). Carl & Kayen win the challenge and receive a two-pound advantage at the weigh-in as a reward. After the challenge, Bryan returns to the military camp.
  - Episode 62: Elimination night. Carl & Kayen lose the most weight, becoming the Biggest Losers of the Week. On the other hand, Bryan & Ikya and Osie & Francis fall below the yellow line. At the elimination, Ikya is eliminated against Osie after Carl & Kayen decide to eliminate the former.

=== Week 14 ===
- Episode: #63–#68
- Air date: April 21–24, 2014
- Summary:
  - Episode 63: The contestants faced their last challenge trekking seven kilometers within five hours to reach the crater of Mt. Pinatubo (for more information about the challenge, see the challenge details). It was won by Bryan (finished the challenge for one hour and forty-three minutes); while Carl & Kayen (finished the challenge for two hours and one minute), and Osie & Francis (finished the challenge for four hours and three seconds) placed second and third, respectively.
  - Episode 64: Recap of previous episodes of the entire season. The episode was dubbed as #BLTakemebackTuesday.
  - Episode 65: The remaining contestants played as coaches and gave their coaches "a last chance workout." After the workout, the contestants faced Calzado for the weigh-in. Bryan lost the most pounds earning him the Biggest Loser of the Week and a spot in the finals. Carl & Kayen, and Francis & Osie fell below the yellow line.
  - Episode 66: At the elimination, Bryan voted for Carl and was eliminated for the second time. After the elimination, Bryan, Kayen, and Francis & Osie stepped onto their respective golden weighing scales and then went to their respective homes where they were welcomed by their families and friends.

=== After camp and Finale ===
- Episode: #67–#68
- Air date: April 23–24, 2014
- Summary:
  - Episode 67: After their leaving the camp, the top four contestants continued their lifestyle with their families.
  - Episode 68: The live finale was held at the Dolphy Theater in ABS-CBN Broadcasting Center. Abra and Tutti Caringal served as opening acts of the show. Former contestants were also presented to the audience, showing their transformations. After that, one by one, the top four were weighed. Bryan emerged as the winner, followed by Kayen, Francis, and Osie. Francis and Osie's prizes were doubled as part the season's twist.
