= Robi Domingo =

Filipino actor, model and host (born 1989)

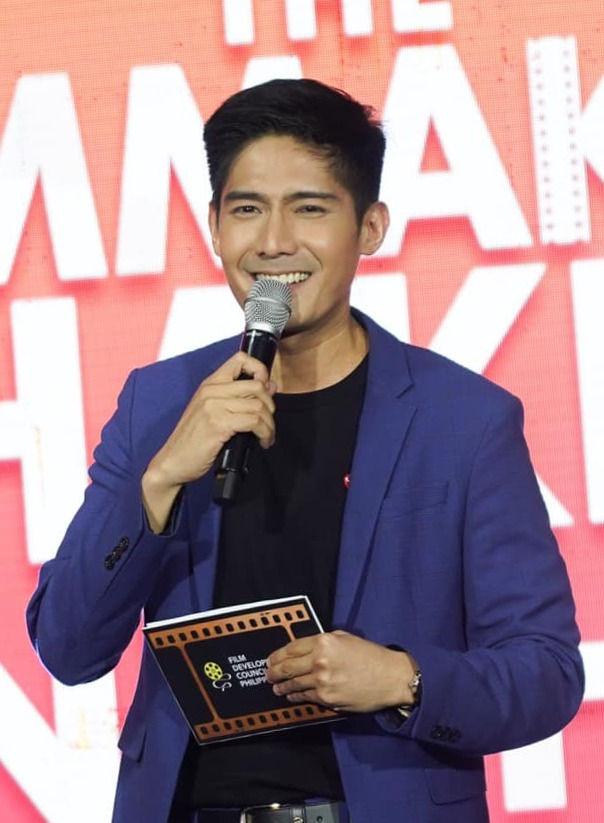
- Domingo in 2022
- Born: Robert Marion Eusebio Domingo; September 27, 1989 (age 37); Quezon City, Metro Manila, Philippines
- Other name: Robi Domingo
- Education: Ateneo de Manila University (BS)
- Occupations: Actor; host; model; VJ
- Years active: 2008–present
- Employer: ABS-CBN (2008-present)
- Agent: Star Magic (2008–present)
- Height: 1.75 m (5 ft 9 in)
- Spouse: Maiqui Pineda (m. 2024)
- Partner: Gretchen Ho (2012–2017)
- Children: 1

Robert Marion Eusebio Domingo (Tagalog pronunciation: [jʊˈsebjo dɔˈmiŋgɔ], born September 27, 1989) is a Filipino VJ, actor, dancer, and host. He was the first runner-up of the reality competition series Pinoy Big Brother: Teen Edition Plus in 2008, after which he became a member of ABS-CBN's group of film and television talents collectively known as Star Magic.

== Early life and education ==
Robert Marion Eusebio Domingo was born on September 27, 1989, to parents who are both doctors. His father, Roberto "Boy" Domingo who acted as his guardian inside the PBB house, is a General Surgeon while his mother, Mary Ann Eusebio Domingo works as the company doctor of SSS. Domingo has a younger brother named Robert Marlo Domingo (known as Maro) who also went inside the PBB house for one day. He was in a relationship with former Ateneo Lady Eagle now turned host, Gretchen Ho.

Domingo has been attending Ateneo de Manila University since elementary and continued studying there for his pre-med studies after exiting the PBB house. On March 23, 2012, he graduated from college with a Bachelor of Science degree in health sciences. Instead of immediately going to medical school as he originally planned, he opted to take a year of absence from his studies to focus on his showbiz career.

== Career ==
Domingo, together with his fellow housemate Josef Elizalde, entered the Pinoy Big Brother house as the "Plus housemates". Their entry was given the "school rivalry" angle because they both came from schools that are considered as rivals in the Philippines. During the first week, they were given the secret task of convincing their housemates that they were "Best buds forever" who have been estranged for a number of years only to see each other again in the show's auditions. They were not able to succeed in their task because their ruse was discovered. Domingo would go on to be part of the Teen Big Four, eventually winning the Second Teen Big Placer award at the end of the season.

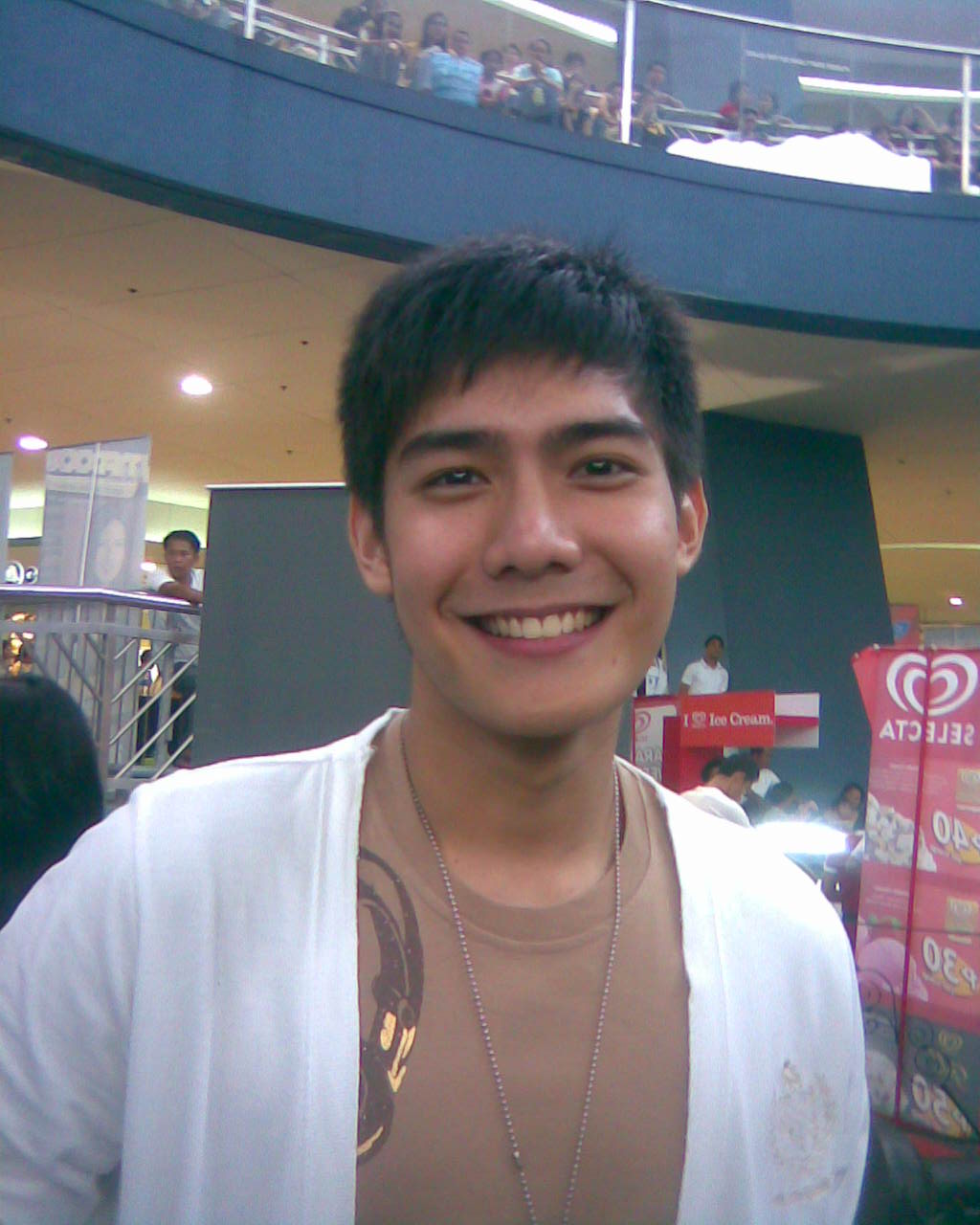
Domingo in 2009

Shortly after exiting the PBB house, Domingo joined the cast of the Philippine remake of My Girl with Elizalde, and another ex-housemate, Nicole Uysiuseng. A few months later, Domingo joined another reality contest, the Myx VJ Search, which he eventually won with 3 others. He was also given a regular spot in ABS-CBN's Sunday variety show, ASAP as part of the dance group, Gigger Boys. His next project was also with the group when he took the role of Arkin in Your Song Presents: Boystown. Aside from being a regular in the main show, he also started hosting the online counterpart of the show, ASAP Chill-Out, with his co-host/s changing over the years.

In late 2010, Domingo and his fellow Gigger Boys were launched as the hosts of the short-lived youth oriented teen variety show called Shoutout!. The show was cancelled on February 11, 2011, after a few months on air because of low ratings. However, not long after, it was announced that Domingo was being tapped to join the elite roster of hosts for Pinoy Big Brother: Unlimited, together with Toni Gonzaga and Bianca Gonzales. A week after the finale of Unlimited, Domingo launched the opening of Pinoy Big Brother: Teen Edition 4 with Gonzaga, Gonzales, and newly minted host, John Prats. He also became a guest star in ABS-CBN's Kahit Puso'y Masugatan late in December 2012, wherein he played the part of Gerald Fernandez opposite Andi Eigenmann's Veronica Salvacion. Aside from this, he was also a semi-regular co-host in Sarah Geronimo's now defunct Sunday night variety show, Sarah G. Live.

After a few months of speculation, it was confirmed that ABS-CBN had decided to tap Domingo as one of the co-hosts for its Philippine franchise of the popular reality show, The Voice of the Philippines in late 2013. He was reunited with Gonzaga for this project, and joined by her younger sister, Alex Gonzaga. In early 2014, he was a host for the second season of ABS-CBN's afternoon reality show, I Dare You, reuniting with Prats, and joined by IDY season 1 host Melisa Cantiveros and Pinoy Big Brother: Unlimited housemate, Denise Joaquin. In addition to this, Domingo was also chosen to be a game master in the second season of the reality show The Biggest Loser Pinoy Edition: Doubles with Matteo Guidicelli in February 2014.

Domingo announced to return as co-host for the 5th season of Pinoy Big Brother dubbed as Pinoy Big Brother: All In in April 2014, but it still remains unknown if he will return to co-host of the second season of The Voice of the Philippines, which is scheduled to air in the mid-2014. In addition, during the 2014 "MYX Music Awards", it was announced that Domingo was officially back on the roster of Myx VJs and was given the segment "Tuesdays with Robi".

Aside from television, Domingo has also starred in a few films, one of which was Cinco, a five-part horror anthology. This film marked the last project that he would have with fellow Gigger Boy AJ Perez before the latter died at the age of 18 in a vehicular accident in Moncada, Tarlac on midnight of April 17, 2011.

As of 2020, he quit again as a host VJ for MYX for the second time due to retrenchment of ABS-CBN's non-renewal of their franchise amid the COVID-19 pandemic in the Philippines, but still active in mostly Kapamilya programs.

== Personal life ==
Domingo was previously in a relationship with host and athlete Gretchen Ho from 2012 to 2017. He married Maiqui Pineda on January 6, 2024 at the Pulilan Church in Bulacan. In 2023, Maiqui was diagnosed with dermatomyositis. Their first child was born in 2026.

== Filmography ==
=== Film ===
Year	Title	Role	Ref.
2010	Paano na Kaya	JC	
2010	Cinco	Ronald	
2011	Won't Last A Day Without You	Oscar	
2018	Petmalu	Tropa Talent Show Host	

=== Television ===
Year	Title	Role
2008	Pinoy Big Brother Teen Edition Plus	Himself / Housemate
2008	My Girl	Vincent
2008–2010; 2014–2020	Myx	Himself / VJ
2008–2014	Studio 23	Himself / VJ
2008–present	ASAP	Himself / Host
2009	Your Song Presents: Boystown	Arkin Sebastian
2009	Maalaala Mo Kaya: Lubid	Steve
2010	Pinoy Big Brother: Teen Clash	Himself / Guest host
2010	Your Song Presents: Andi	Marvin
2010	Mara Clara	Himself (cameo)
2010–2011	Shout Out!	Himself / Host
2011	Wansapanataym: Three-In-One	Caloy
2011	My Binondo Girl	Chen Sy II
2011	I Dare You	Celebrity participant
2011–2012	Pinoy Big Brother Unlimited	Himself / Host
2012	Sarah G. Live	Himself / Guest host
2012	Pinoy Big Brother: Teen Edition 4	Himself / Host
2012	It's Showtime	Guest judge
2012–2013	Kahit Puso'y Masugatan	Gerald Fernandez
2013	The Voice of the Philippines	Himself / Host
2013	I Dare You	Himself / Host
2014	The Biggest Loser: Doubles	Himself / Host
2014	Pinoy Big Brother: All In	Himself / Host
2014–present	TFCkat	Himself / Host
2015; 2024	The Voice Kids	Himself / Host
2015; 2024	Pinoy Big Brother: 737	Himself / Host
2015–2020	Umagang Kay Ganda	Himself / Host
2015–2016	Dance Kids	Himself / Host
2016–2019	It's Showtime	Himself / Guest host
2016–2017	Pinoy Big Brother: Lucky 7	Himself / Host
2016–present	Math-Dali	Himself / Host
2016–2020	University Town	Himself / Host
2017	I Can Do That	Himself / Host
2018	Star Hunt: The Grand Audition Show	Himself / Host
2018	The Kids' Choice	Himself / Host
2018–2019	Pinoy Big Brother: Otso	Himself / Host
2019	Unlisted	Himself / Host
2020–2022	Game KNB?	Himself / Host
2020–2021	Pinoy Big Brother: Connect	Himself / Host
2021	Aja! Aja! Tayo sa Jeju	Himself / Host
2021–2022	Pinoy Big Brother: Kumunity Season 10	Himself / Host
2022	Idol Philippines	Himself / Host
2023	It's Your Lucky Day	Himself / Host
2023	Watchawin	Himself / Host
2024	The Voice Teens	Himself / Host
2024–2025	Pinoy Big Brother: Gen 11 Big 4 Ever	Himself / Host
2025	Time to Dance	Himself / Host
2025	It's Showtime	Himself / Guest
2025	Pinoy Big Brother: Celebrity Collab Edition	Himself / Host
2025	Pilipinas Got Talent season 7	Himself / Host
2025	Idol Kids Philippines	Himself / Host
2025	Eat Bulaga!	Himself / Guest
2025	Pinoy Big Brother: Celebrity Collab Edition 2.0	Himself / Host

=== TV specials ===
Year	Title	Role
2010	Bench Uncut: A Bold Look at the Future	Model
2014–2018; 2021–2023, 2025	Miss Philippines Earth	Host
2015–present	Doowee Donut Beat Band Competition Grand Finals	Host
2016–2019	PMPC Star Awards for Television	Host
2017–present	Mr. & Ms. Chinatown Grand Coronation Night	Host
2024	Miss Earth 2024	Host
2024	2024 Metro Manila Film Festival Gabi ng Parangal	Host

== Awards and nominations ==
Year	Award giving body	Category	Nominated work	Results
2008	25th PMPC Star Awards for TV	Best New Male TV Personality	ASAP	Won
2008	Pure N' Fresh Top Teen Awards	Top Teen Male Heartthrob	—N/a	Won
2010	1st Kabarkada Choice Awards	Choice Kabarkada	—N/a	Won
2010	ASAP Pop Viewers' Choice Awards	Pop Cutie	—N/a	Won
2011	13th Gawad PASADO Awards	Pinakapasadong Kabataan sa Larangan ng Pelikula at Akademya	—N/a	Won
2013	27th PMPC Star Awards for TV	Best Talent Search Program Host (shared with The Voice of the Philippines host)	The Voice of the Philippines	Won
2014	28th PMPC Star Awards for TV	Best Reality Show Host	Pinoy Big Brother: All In (shared with Pinoy Big Brother: All In hosts)	Won
2014	28th PMPC Star Awards for TV	Best Reality Show Host	I Dare You (shared with I Dare You)	Nominated
2014	28th PMPC Star Awards for TV	Best Reality Show Host	The Biggest Loser Pinoy Edition: Doubles (shared with The Biggest Loser Pinoy Edition: Doubles host)	Nominated
2015	2015 FAMAS Awards	German Moreno Youth Achievement Award	—N/a	Won
2016	30th PMPC Star Awards for Television	Best Talent Search Host shared with Luis Manzano and Kim Chiu	The Voice Kids (season 3)	Won
2016	6th EdukCircle Awards	Best Talent Show Host	Dance Kids	Won
2017	Alta Media Icon Awards	Best Reality/ Talent Show Host	The Voice Kids (season 3)	Won
2017	7th EdukCircle Awards	Best Male Variety Show Host	ASAP	Won
2017	Comguild Media Awards	Advertisers Friendly Host of the Year		Won
