= The Biggest Loser Pinoy Edition season 1 =

The Biggest Loser Pinoy Edition
- Season 1
- Starring: Chinggay Andrada; Jim Saret
- No. of episodes: 93

Release
- Original network: ABS-CBN
- Original release: May 30 – October 8, 2011

The first season of The Biggest Loser Pinoy Edition was aired on ABS-CBN. It is based on The Biggest Loser franchise that first became popular in the United States. The show is presented by Sharon Cuneta and game master Derek Ramsay. Chinggay Andrada and Jim Saret are the trainers for the contestants. On October 8, 2011, Larry Martin was titled the first Pinoy Biggest Loser at the Ynares Sports Arena.

== Contestants ==
Twelve contestants were revealed in a special primer entitled Bigating Pinoy: The Biggest Loser Primer which aired May 15, 2011. Four additional contestants were revealed in the season premiere, but only two contestants (Destiny and Larry) earned their right to stay to complete the list of fourteen contestants. In Episode 2, it was announced that the two sent home in the qualifier competition will return later in the game to earn a second chance contestant spot. On week 15, the 12 eliminated contestants, known as the Black Team, returned to the camp. Only one of them will return to the game. On week 16, Hazel won the wildcard competition and returned to the game.

| Contestant | Team | Individuals | Status | Total Votes |
|---|---|---|---|---|
| Andy Gomez de Liaño, Returned Week 8 | X | | Sent Home Pre-Game | ^{[E1]} |
| Leigh Villegas, Returned Week 8 | X | | Sent Home Pre-Game | ^{[E1]} |
| Destiny Duarte, 23, Cebu | Red Team | | Eliminated Week 3 | 4 |
| JM Oloris, 32, Manila | Blue Team | | Eliminated Week 4 | 4 |
| Edden Cruz, 35, Cebu | Blue Team | | Eliminated Week 5 | 4 |
| Eric Limatog, 22, Cebu | Blue Team | Green | Eliminated Week 7 | 5 |
| Joy Siy, 25, Pasig | Blue Team | Orange | Eliminated Week 8 | 5 |
| Alan Choachuy, 40, Cebu | Blue Team | Yellow | Eliminated Week 9 | 5 |
| Eboy Bautista, 33, Parañaque | Red Team | Red | Eliminated Week 10 | 5 |
| Hazel Chua, Returned Week 16 | Red Team | Pink | Eliminated Week 11 | 4 |
| Andy Gomez de Liaño, 24, Quezon City | X | Light Brown | Eliminated Week 12 | 3 |
| Winwin Cabinta, 18, Bukidnon | Red Team | Purple | Eliminated Week 14 | 2 |
| Leigh Villegas, 24, Parañaque | X | Deep Pink | Eliminated Week 15 | ^{[R]} |
| Ryan Razon, 31, Pampanga | Red Team | Brown | Eliminated Week 15 | 2 |
| Hazel Chua, 22, Naga City | Red Team | Pink | 4th Runner-Up | |
| Angela Chico-Lupangco, 26, Rizal | Blue Team | Light Green | 3rd Runner-Up | |
| Raffy Tan, 22, Negros Occidental | Red Team | Light Blue | 2nd Runner-Up | |
| Art Mendoza, 35, Makati | Red Team | Blue^{[*]} | Runner-Up | |
| Larry Martin, 36, Camarines Sur | Blue Team | Gray | The Biggest Loser | |

The "Total Votes" column indicates the number of votes cast against the contestant when he/she was eliminated.
^[E1] Andy and Leigh lost the challenge to become a contestant, and were sent home. They both returned Week 8.
^[R] Leigh fell below the red line and was automatically eliminated.
^[*] In the Week 9 Elimination, Art was given a yellow T-shirt from Alan, but does not affect any gameplay.

== Challenges ==
Each week, contestants meet Derek Ramsay, the Game Master, and face physical challenges to test their teamwork, endurance and strength. After the first challenge where Destiny and Larry earned the right to stay, contestants were separated into two teams by their respective fitness trainers; namely, the Red and the Blue team.

There are two kinds of challenges performed every week. One is the "Fun Challenge", where the challenge consisted of no serious ramifications, punishments and/or reward. The second challenge is the "Big Challenge" in which a reward and punishment are on the line. Beginning Week 7, the contestants were no longer under the banner of their respective teams, and instead were given individual colors to remind them that they were on their own, competing against each other. Challenges tabulated in here will only be the "Big Challenge".

=== Team Challenges ===
| Team | Week | | | |
| Team | 3 | 4 | 5 | 6 |
|---|---|---|---|---|
| Red Team | Lose | Lose | Lose | Lose |
| Blue Team | Win | Win | Win | Win |

=== Individual Challenges ===
| Contestant | Week | | | | | | | | |
| Contestant | 7 | 8 | 9 | 11 | 12 | 14 | 15 | 16 | 17 |
|---|---|---|---|---|---|---|---|---|---|
| Larry | 5th | 2nd | X | Win | 4th | X | 2nd | Win | 1st |
| Art | 3rd | 4th | X | Lose, Heats | X | Win | 4th | Win | Lose |
| Raffy | 2nd | 1st | X | Lose, Heats | 2nd | Win | 1st | Win | Lose |
| Angela | 6th | 5th | Win | Lose, Heats | 1st | Lose | 5th | Win | Lose |
| Hazel | 10th | 1st | X | Lose, Finals | | | | | 2nd |
| Ryan | 4th | 5th | Win | Lose, Finals | 6th | Win | 3rd | | |
| Leigh | | | Lose | Lose, Heats | 7th | Lose | 6th | | |
| Winwin | 11th | 3rd | X | Lose, Heats | 3rd | Lose | | | |
| Andy | | | Lose | Lose, Heats | 5th | | | | |
| Eboy | 8th | 2nd | X | | | | | | |
| Alan | 1st | 3rd | X | | | | | | |
| Joy | 9th | 4th | | | | | | | |
| Eric | 7th | | | | | | | | |

=== Wildcard Round ===
On week 15, the 12 eliminated contestants, known as the Black Team, returned to the camp. Only one of them will go back into the game. A series of challenges will trim down the number of contestants from 12 to 4, then the biggest loser of the week between the 4 returning contestants will go back into the game. The wildcard competition was won by Hazel.

| Contestant | Placement | Status |
|---|---|---|
| Andy | 12th | Eliminated, Round 1, Initial Weigh-in (Weight Gain) |
| Winwin | 11th | Eliminated, Round 1, Initial Weigh-in (Weight Gain) |
| Eboy | 10th | Eliminated, Round 2, Injury |
| Leigh | 9th | Eliminated, Round 2, 1st Elimination Challenge |
| Destiny | 8th | Eliminated, Round 2, 2nd Elimination Challenge |
| Joy | 7th | Eliminated, Round 2, 3rd Elimination Challenge |
| Alan | 6th | Eliminated, Round 3, Big Challenge (Voted out by remaining contestants) |
| JM | 5th | Eliminated, Round 4, Final Elimination Challenge |
| Edden | 4th | Eliminated, Round 5, Qualifying Weigh-in |
| Ryan | 3rd | Eliminated, Round 5, Qualifying Weigh-in |
| Eric | 2nd | Eliminated, Round 5, Qualifying Weigh-in |
| Hazel | 1st | Returned to Game |

== Weigh-ins ==
| Contestant | Age | Start Wt. | Week | | | | | | | | | | | | | | | | Wt. Lost | % Lost |
| Contestant | Age | Start Wt. | 3 | 4 | 5 | 6^{[T1]} | 7^{[T2]} | 8 | 9^{[T3]} | 10 | 11 | 12^{[T4]} | 13^{[T5]} | 14^{[T6]} | 15^{[T7]}^{[T8]} | 16^{[T9]} | 17^{[T10]} | Finale^{[T11]} | Wt. Lost | % Lost |
|---|---|---|---|---|---|---|---|---|---|---|---|---|---|---|---|---|---|---|---|---|
| Larry | 36 | 255 | 229 | 219 | 213 | 207 | 199 | 196 | 191 | 189 | 186 | 175 | 173 | 172 | 169 | 168 | 170 | 154 | 101 | 39.61% |
| Art | 35 | 341 | 320 | 302 | 298 | 294 | 287 | 281 | 277 | 273 | 270 | 260 | 250 | 249 | 242 | 237 | 236 | 212 | 129 | 37.83% |
| Raffy | 22 | 287 | 269 | 262 | 254 | 251 | 245 | 237 | 232 | 229 | 226 | 221 | 216 | 217 | 213 | 205 | 207 | 187 | 100 | 34.84% |
| Angela | 26 | 223 | 208 | 201 | 195 | 192 | 188 | 184 | 180 | 174 | 172 | 164 | 163 | 162 | 160 | 156 | 155 | 148 | 75 | 33.63% |
| Hazel | 22 | 206 | 198 | 189 | 186 | 184 | 180 | 178 | 173 | 171 | 172 | | | | 159 | 152 | 150 | 138 | 68 | 33.01% |
| Ryan | 31 | 293 | 269 | 257 | 249 | 245 | 239 | 233 | 227 | 223 | 222 | 210 | 204 | 200 | 195 | 189 | | 174 | 119 | 40.61% |
| Leigh | 24 | 230 | | | | | | 210 | 203 | 199 | 199 | 195 | 190 | 185 | 182 | | | 168 | 62 | 26.70% |
| Winwin | 18 | 260 | 243 | 232 | 225 | 222 | 216 | 213 | 206 | 204 | 205 | 195 | 188 | 189 | 193 | | | 179 | 81 | 31.15% |
| Andy | 24 | 274 | | | | | | 243 | 235 | 230 | 229 | 221 | | | 232 | | | 227 | 47 | 17.15% |
| Eboy | 33 | 481 | 447 | 431 | 417 | 412 | 402 | 396 | 388 | 384 | | | | | 366 | | | 342 | 139 | 28.90% |
| Alan | 40 | 309 | 286 | 278 | 269 | 263 | 261 | 251 | 247 | | | | | | 224 | | | 184 | 125 | 40.45% |
| Joy | 25 | 320 | 301 | 290 | 284 | 278 | 271 | 268 | | | | | | | 245 | | | 210 | 110 | 34.37% |
| Eric | 22 | 272 | 256 | 247 | 244 | 236 | 232 | | | | | | | | 207 | 198 | | 163 | 109 | 40.07% |
| Edden | 35 | 221 | 208 | 201 | 197 | | | | | | | | | | 180 | 175 | | 166 | 55 | 24.89% |
| JM | 32 | 340 | 322 | 310 | | | | | | | | | | | 269 | | | 229 | 111 | 32.65% |
| Destiny | 23 | 221 | 211 | | | | | | | | | | | | 192 | | | 175 | 45 | 20.45% |

Teams
Member of Chinggay's team (Weeks 1–5); Jim's team (Week 6)
Member of Jim's team (Weeks 1–5); Chinggay's team (Week 6)
At-Home Players (Weeks 1–8)

Standings
Week's Biggest Loser (Team/Individuals)
Week's Biggest Loser and Immunity
Immunity (Challenge)
Last person eliminated before the finale
Results of At-Home Players

Winners
₱1,000,000 Winner (among the finalists)
₱200,000 Winner (among the eliminated contestants)

=== Weigh-In Difference History ===
| Contestant | Week | | | | | | | | | | | | | | | | Total |
| Contestant | 3 | 4 | 5 | 6^{[T1]} | 7^{[T2]} | 8 | 9^{[T3]} | 10 | 11 | 12^{[T4]} | 13^{[T5]} | 14^{[T6]} | 15^{[T7]}^{[T8]} | 16^{[T9]} | 17^{[T10]} | Finale^{[T11]} | Total |
|---|---|---|---|---|---|---|---|---|---|---|---|---|---|---|---|---|---|
| Larry | -26 | -10 | -6 | -6 | -8 | -3 | -5 | -2 | -3 | -11 | -2 | -1 | -3^{8} | -1 | +2 | -16 | -101 |
| Art | -21 | -18 | -4 | -4 | -7^{1} | -6 | -4 | -4 | -3 | -10 | -10 | -1^{7} | -7^{8} | -5 | -1 | -24 | -129 |
| Raffy | -18 | -7 | -8 | -3 | -6 | -8^{4} | -5 | -3 | -3 | -5 | -5 | +1^{7} | -4^{8} | -8 | +2 | -20 | -100 |
| Angela | -15 | -7 | -6 | -3 | -4 | -4 | -4 | -6 | -2 | -8 | -1 | -1 | -2^{8} | -4 | -1 | -7 | -75 |
| Hazel | -8 | -9 | -3 | -2 | -4 | -2^{2} | -5 | -2 | +1 | | | | -13^{9} | -7 | -2^{10} | -12 | -68 |
| Ryan | -24 | -12 | -8 | -4 | -6 | -6 | -6^{5} | -4 | -1 | -12 | -6 | -4^{7} | -5^{8} | -6 | | -15 | -119 |
| Leigh | | | | | | -20^{3} | -7 | -4 | 0 | -4^{6} | -5 | -5 | -3 | | | -14 | -62 |
| Winwin | -17 | -11 | -7 | -3 | -6 | -3 | -7 | -2 | +1 | -10 | -7 | +1 | +4^{9} | | | -14 | -81 |
| Andy | | | | | | -31^{3} | -8 | -5 | -1 | -8 | | | +11^{9} | | | -5 | -47 |
| Eboy | -34 | -16 | -14 | -5 | -10 | -6 | -8 | -4 | | | | | -18^{9} | | | -24 | -139 |
| Alan | -23 | -8 | -9 | -6 | -2 | -10 | -4 | | | | | | -23^{9} | | | -40 | -125 |
| Joy | -19 | -11 | -6 | -6 | -7 | -3 | | | | | | | -23^{9} | | | -35 | -110 |
| Eric | -16 | -9 | -3 | -8 | -4 | | | | | | | | -25^{9} | -9 | | -35 | -109 |
| Edden | -13 | -7 | -4 | | | | | | | | | | -17^{9} | -5 | | -9 | -55 |
| JM | -18 | -12 | | | | | | | | | | | -41^{9} | | | -40 | -111 |
| Destiny | -10 | | | | | | | | | | | | -19^{9} | | | -17 | -45 |

=== Weigh-in percentages history ===
| Contestant | Week | | | | | | | | | | | | | | | | Total |
| Contestant | 3 | 4 | 5 | 6^{[T1]} | 7^{[T2]} | 8 | 9^{[T3]} | 10 | 11 | 12^{[T4]} | 13^{[T5]} | 14^{[T6]} | 15^{[T7]}^{[T8]} | 16^{[T9]} | 17^{[T10]} | Finale^{[T11]} | Total |
|---|---|---|---|---|---|---|---|---|---|---|---|---|---|---|---|---|---|
| Larry | -10.20% | -4.37% | -2.74% | -2.82% | -3.86% | -1.51% | -2.55% | -1.05% | -1.57% | -5.91% | -1.14% | -0.58% | -1.74%^{8} | -0.59% | +1.19% | -9.41% | -39.61% |
| Art | -6.16% | -5.63% | -1.32% | -1.34% | -2.38%^{1} | -2.09% | -1.42% | -1.44% | -1.08% | -3.70% | -3.85% | -0.40%^{7} | -2.81%^{8} | -2.07% | -0.42% | -10.17% | -37.83% |
| Raffy | -6.27% | -2.60% | -3.05% | -1.18% | -2.39% | -3.27% ^{4} | -2.11% | -1.29% | -1.29% | -2.21% | -2.26% | +0.46%^{7} | -1.84%^{8} | -3.76% | +0.98% | -9.66% | -34.84% |
| Angela | -6.73% | -3.37% | -2.99% | -1.54% | -2.08% | -2.13% | -2.17% | -3.33% | -1.11% | -4.65% | -0.61% | -0.61% | -1.23%^{8} | -2.50% | -0.64% | -4.52% | -33.63% |
| Hazel | -3.88% | -4.55% | -1.59% | -1.08% | -2.17% | -1.11%^{2} | -2.81% | -1.16% | +0.58% | | | | -7.56%^{9} | -4.40% | -1.32%^{10} | -8.00% | -33.01% |
| Ryan | -8.19% | -4.46% | -3.11% | -1.61% | -2.45% | -2.51% | -2.58%^{5} | -1.76% | -0.44% | -5.41% | -2.86% | -1.96%^{7} | -2.50%^{8} | -3.08% | | -7.94% | -40.61% |
| Leigh | | | | | | -8.70%^{3} | -3.33% | -1.97% | 0.00% | -2.01%^{6} | -2.56% | -2.63% | -1.62% | | | -7.69% | -26.70% |
| Winwin | -6.54% | -4.53% | -3.02% | -1.33% | -2.70% | -1.39% | -3.29% | -0.97% | +0.49% | -4.88% | -3.59% | +0.53% | +2.12%^{9} | | | -7.25% | -31.15% |
| Andy | | | | | | -11.31%^{3} | -3.29% | -2.13% | -0.43% | 3.49% | | | +4.98%^{9} | | | -2.16% | -17.15% |
| Eboy | -7.07% | -3.58% | -3.25% | -1.20% | -2.43% | -1.49% | -2.02% | -1.03% | | | | | -4.69%^{9} | | | -6.56% | -28.90% |
| Alan | -7.44% | -2.80% | -3.24% | -2.23% | -0.76% | -3.83% | -1.59% | | | | | | -9.31%^{9} | | | -17.85% | -40.45% |
| Joy | -5.94% | -3.65% | -2.07% | -2.11% | -2.52% | -1.11% | | | | | | | -8.58%^{9} | | | -14.29% | -34.37% |
| Eric | -5.88% | -3.52% | -1.21% | -3.28% | -1.69% | | | | | | | | -10.78%^{9} | -4.35% | | -17.68% | -40.07% |
| Edden | -5.88% | -3.37% | -1.99% | | | | | | | | | | -8.63%^{9} | -2.78% | | -5.14% | -24.89% |
| JM | -5.29% | -3.73% | | | | | | | | | | | -13.23%^{9} | | | -14.87% | -32.65% |
| Destiny | -4.52% | | | | | | | | | | | | -9.00%^{9} | | | -8.85% | -20.45% |

^[T1] This week is a non-elimination week.
^[T2] Team allocation no longer exist beginning Week 7.
^[T3] This week is a Ryan-Eboy vs Andy-Leigh weigh-in.
^[T4] This week the bottom 4 contestants fell below the yellow line, instead of the usual 2.
^[T5] This week if the contestants collectively lose 30 lbs., no one would be eliminated.
^[T6] This week is duel week. The match-ups were Angela vs Art, Leigh vs Ryan and Raffy vs Winwin.
^[T7] This week the red line was implemented. The contestant who loses the least weight is automatically eliminated.
^[T8] This week is loved ones week. The weight lost by their loved ones served as the weight advantage for the contestants.
^[T9] This week is a non-elimination week since it is wildcard week. There are two biggest losers of the week: the biggest loser among the returning contestants will return to the game while the biggest loser among the remaining contestants is granted permanent immunity until the finale.
^[T10] This week the bottom 3 contestants fell below the yellow line, instead of the usual 2. The contestants above the yellow line are granted permanent immunity until the finale. No voting was done for this round and no one was eliminated at camp. Instead, the biggest loser (from day 1 until the finale) among the bottom 3 is granted the third and final spot towards becoming the Biggest Loser. While there are technically 5 contestants in the finale, only 3 are eligible of becoming the Biggest Loser.
^[T11] Contrary to the announcement on week 17, all 5 contestants in the finale are eligible of becoming the Biggest Loser. Because of this, the prizes of the 2nd and 3rd placers were increased to P500,000 each, while the 4th and 5th placers also received P500,000 each as well.

^1 Art won a 2 lb. advantage this week, therefore his weight loss became 9 lbs. (-3.06%).
^2 Hazel won a 2 lb. advantage this week, therefore her weight loss became 4 lbs. (-2.22%).
^3 Andy and Leigh returned Week 8, and their weight loss consisted of eight weeks at home.
^4 Raffy won a 2 lb. advantage this week, but was also awarded a 2 lb. disadvantage, so they cancel each other out.
^5 Ryan won a 5 lb. advantage this week, therefore his weight loss became 11 lbs. (-4.72%).
^6 Leigh was awarded a 2 lb. disadvantage this week, therefore her weight loss became 2 lbs. (-1.01%).
^7 Art, Raffy and Ryan each won a 1 lb. advantage this week, therefore their weight loss became 2 lbs (-0.80%), 5 lbs (-2.45%) and 0 lbs (0.00%), respectively.
^8 Angela, Art, Larry, Raffy and Ryan won a 4, 9, 5, 4 and 4 lb. advantage this week, respectively. Therefore, their weight loss became 6 lbs (-3.70%), 16 lbs (-6.43%), 8 lbs (-4.65%), 8 lbs (-3.69%) and 8 lbs (-4.50%), respectively.
^9 All eliminated contestants returned Week 15, and their weight difference consisted of the time between their elimination and week 15.
^10 Hazel won a 1 lb. advantage this week, therefore her weight loss became 3 lbs. (-1.97%).

== Elimination History ==
| Week | 1 | 2 | 3 | 4 | 5 | 6 | 7 | 8 | 9 | 10 | 11 | 12 | 13 | 14 | 15 | | 16 | 17 | 18: Finale | Total votes |
| Grouping | Team | | | | | Individual | | | | | | | | | Individual | Wildcard | | Individual | | Total votes |
|---|---|---|---|---|---|---|---|---|---|---|---|---|---|---|---|---|---|---|---|---|
| Larry | — | — | X | JM | Edden | — | Eric | Winwin | Art | Eboy | Hazel | Andy | — | Winwin | Ryan | — | — | X | Winner | 1 (+0) |
| Art | — | — | ? | X | X | — | Angela | Joy | X | Eboy | Hazel | Andy | — | Ryan | Ryan | — | — | X | Runner-up | 0 (+2) |
| Raffy | — | — | ? | X | X | — | Eric | Joy | ? | Eboy | Winwin | X | — | Angela | Angela | — | — | | Third place | 0 |
| Angela | — | — | X | Larry | Edden | — | X | Joy | Art | Eboy | Hazel | X | — | X | X | — | — | X | Fourth place | 2 (+4) |
| Hazel | — | — | Destiny | X | X | — | Eric | Joy | Alan | ? | X | Eliminated | | | | Advanced | First | | Fifth place | 0 (+4) |
| Ryan | — | — | Destiny | X | X | — | Eric | Joy | Alan | Eboy | Hazel | Andy | — | X | X | Advanced | Third | Eliminated | Home Winner | 0 (+3) |
| Leigh | Sent Home Week 1; Returned Week 8 | | | | | | | | Alan | ? | ? | X | — | Winwin | X | Ninth | Eliminated | | | 0 |
| Winwin | — | — | Destiny | X | X | — | Angela | X | Alan | X | X | ? | — | X | Eliminated | Eleventh | Re-eliminated | | | 0 (+6) |
| Andy | Sent Home Week 1; Returned Week 8 | | | | | | | | Alan | Winwin | ? | X | Eliminated | | | Twelfth | Re-eliminated | | | 3 |
| Eboy | — | — | Destiny | X | X | — | Eric | ? | ? | X | Eliminated | | | | | Tenth | Re-eliminated | | | 5 (+5) |
| Alan | — | — | X | JM | Angela | — | Angela | Winwin | X | Eliminated | | | | | | Sixth | Re-eliminated | | | 0 (+5) |
| Joy | — | — | X | JM | Edden | — | Angela | X | Eliminated | | | | | | | Seventh | Re-eliminated | | | 0 (+5) |
| Eric | — | — | X | ? | Edden | — | X | Eliminated | | | | | | | | Advanced | Second | Re-eliminated | | 5 |
| Edden | — | — | X | JM | Angela | Eliminated | | | | | | | | | | Advanced | Fourth | Re-eliminated | | 4 |
| JM | — | — | X | Angela | Eliminated | | | | | | | | | | | Fifth | Re-eliminated | | | 4 |
| Destiny | — | — | Hazel | Eliminated | | | | | | | | | | | | Eighth | Re-eliminated | | | 4 |
| Eliminated | None | | Destiny 4 of 7 votes | JM 4 of 7 votes | Edden 4 of 6 votes | None | Eric 5 of 11 votes | Joy 5 of 10 votes | Alan 5 of 11 votes | Eboy 5 of 10 votes | Hazel 4 of 9 votes | Andy 3 of 8 votes | None | Winwin 2 of 7 votes | Ryan 2 of 5 votes Leigh Automatic Elimination | JM, Alan, Joy, Destiny, Leigh, Eboy, Winwin, Andy | Eric, Ryan, Edden | None | | |

Color keys

Winner
Runners-up
Home Winner
Immunity
? Immunity, vote not revealed
X Below yellow line, unable to vote
X Below red line, automatically eliminated
X Not in elimination, unable to vote
? Vote not revealed
Valid vote cast
– Non-elimination round
Sent Home; Returned at some point in the competition
Eliminated

== Episode Summaries ==
The daily summaries of each episode do not specifically reflect its aired week.

=== Week 1 ===
- Episode 1: Alan, Angela, Art, Eboy, Edden, Eric, Hazel, JM, Joy, Raffy, Ryan, and Winwin enter the Biggest Loser campus for a four-month weight loss journey. Right when the original twelve contestants stepped onto the camp, they were told by the host Sharon that four more contestants would be introduced (Andy, Destiny, Larry, and Leigh). However, the four contestants must earn their right to stay for the final two spots as official contestants. In the qualifying challenge, the four contestants must crawl back and forth to grab their row's colored flags. Meanwhile, the twelve original contestants take turns as a human timer for the challenge by performing jumping jacks. The first two contestants to grab all their colored flags earn contestant status. Destiny and Larry completed the qualifying challenge, while Andy and Leigh did not and were eliminated.
- Episode 2: Before Andy and Leigh officially left the camp, Sharon surprises them with the news that they will be training with a Biggest Loser team at home. They will both come back at some point later in the game hoping for a second chance in the competition. The fourteen official contestants enter the camp for an opening night feast with their favorite foods, hoping it is their final unhealthy feast. The next day, they are introduced with the dirty dishes and the trainers Chinggay and Jim. Also that day, the contestants weigh in for the first time. Eric, Alan, and Angela weigh in.
- Episode 3: The remaining eleven contestants weigh in. Eboy is the heaviest male of the group weighing in at 481 pounds, and is also stated to be one of the heaviest contestants in the whole franchise. Joy is the heaviest female of the group weighing in at 320 pounds.
- Episode 4: Chinggay and Jim train for the contestants' first training. This also gave the trainers' chance to learn some background knowledge from the contestants. Later, the trainers choose which contestants will be in their team. The first five contestants are chosen. Chinggay chooses Destiny, Winwin, and Art for the Red Team. Jim chooses Alan and Larry for the Blue Team.
- Episode 5: The remaining nine contestants get their team colors. Chinggay chooses Hazel, Raffy, Ryan, and Eboy for the Red Team. Jim chooses Angela, Eric, JM, Edden, and Joy for the Blue Team. Later, the Red and Blue teams participate in their first team challenge. Each team must pull a 10-ton truck forward to a finish line. Along the way, there will be two stops where crates must be loaded onto the truck. When a team's truck reaches the finish line, the teammates must unload the truck and re-arrange the crates to form the logo of the show. During the competition in the first loading stop, Destiny sprains her foot and forces the Red Team to lose valuable time. At the end, Blue Team wins the competition and win a spa treatment and massage. The Red Team lost and therefore they received a disadvantage. The Red Team loses gym time and trainer Chinggay for 48 hours.

=== Week 2 ===
- Episode 6: The teams begin exercising for the upcoming weigh-in later in the week. The teams report in their challenge results. The Red Team compromises their disadvantage by working on their teamwork skills and exercising with what they have outside.
- Episode 7: The Red and Blue Team participate in a friendly competition to boost up exercise and teamwork skills. Teams must quickly tie in shoes one at a time with each team member. Blue Team once again wins the competition, and their reward was that each team member were given a chance to send a pair of shoes to loved ones.
- Episode 8: Teams arrive at St. Luke's Medical Center to learn about their obesity health risks.
- Episode 9: The Red and Blue Team compete in a challenge. The challenge also introduced a Yellow Team which consisted of healthy children. Each contestant from each team must run one heat in a 100-meter dash. The team who runs the most fastest heats win a healthy gourmet dinner. The losing team gets a disadvantage of sleeping outside for one night. Blue Team wins while Red Team loses, the current win record is 3–0.
- Episode 10: The contestants workout one final time before their first weigh-in later in the night. The weigh-in begun with the Blue Team. The Blue Team lost a total of 130 pounds and a weight loss percentage of 6.70%. In order for the Red Team to win the weigh-in, they must lose more than 140 pounds.

=== Week 3 ===
- Episode 11: The Red Team weighs in. However, the Blue Team won the weigh-in after the Red Team fails to lose eight more pounds toward their team total. The team discusses mainly on whether Destiny or Hazel should go due to their weight loss. In the end, the team voted on effort rather than weight and so Destiny was voted out 4-1 (two votes not revealed). At home, Destiny continues with her weight loss journey to make her family proud.
- Episode 12: The teams compete in a challenge to stay away from punishment. The Blue Team wins with Alan and Joy, while the Red Team lost with Art and Winwin. The losing team had to clean up the lockers.
- Episode 13: In the teams' big challenge, they had to retrieve treasure chests from the water. The Blue Team won letters from home. The Blue Team so far has won all the challenges. Joy asked to trade in her letter for Raffy's letter.
- Episode 14: Teams participate in their first temptation. The person who eats the most lechon wins individual immunity. Two contestants, both from the Red Team, participated in the temptation. Hazel ate 55 grams while Winwin ate 50 grams. Therefore, Hazel won the individual immunity from the temptation.
- Episode 15: Teams weigh in for the second time in the competition. The Blue Team loses 3.54%. For the first time, the Red Team finally wins with losing 4.18%. This marks the Red Team's first competitive win, and Blue Team's first elimination ceremony.

=== Week 4 ===
- Episode 16: The Blue Team deliberates on whether who should go. JM was eliminated with a 4-1-1 vote including Angela and Larry.
- Episode 17: The Red Team celebrates their first win. Their trainer Chinggay awards them with a Sony Walkman. The Biggest Loser of the week Art was awarded a ten-minute video call with loved ones. Later, the Red and Blue teams attended a dance class.
- Episode 18: Teams competed in their next big challenge. They must all pull weight to win. However, every two minutes, one team member must be let go. The Blue Team won, and their reward was to sit out an opposing team member on the weigh-in and their weight would not count that week. The Blue Team chose Eboy.
- Episode 19: The Blue Team additionally won a Sony Walkman for their consistent effort in the challenges. Both teams work out for the final time before the weekly weigh-in.
- Episode 20: The teams weigh-in and this week, the trainers decide to join in the weigh-in. The Red Team loses 30 lbs. (2.42%) while the Blue Team loses 34 lbs. (2.37%), the closest weigh-in of the season so far losing by only one pound. The Red Team once again wins the weigh-in for the second week in a row.

=== Week 5 ===
- Episode 21: A new twist is introduced after Edden's elimination: teams switch trainers. Jim now trains the Red Team, while Chinggay trains the Blue Team.
- Episode 22: It is a new day for the contestants to train. The Red team begins to connect with Jim and Chinggay trains the Blue team roughly. Joy gets tired almost to the point of giving up.
- Episode 23: The two teams face another challenge. The first obstacle required the team to dig with their hands and crawl under a log. For the second obstacle, each team needed to create a pile of sand taken from a designated area and use it as a jumping point to grab their team flag 13 feet above the ground. Both teams were given one basin and a towel. The Blue Team once again won the challenge with Alan grabbing the flag. The losing team incurred a 3-pound disadvantage from the weigh-in while the winning team was given 20 minutes of phone call time with their family members.
- Episode 24: The team meets another temptation challenge with a vending machine containing chocolates, chips and soda. During the first round of the challenge, no one except for Raffy gave in. In the second round of the challenge, they were told that the immunity was not the only thing at stake but also hidden in one of the chocolate packets was a 20,000 peso cash prize. Raffy and Ryan decided to help out Hazel to win the money for her sister's tuition fee. Hazel managed to get the prize money; however, this did not sit well with their new coach Jim.
- Episode 25: The two teams broke some more sweat in their final workout before facing the weigh-in. The two trainers again joined in the weigh-in. The Red Team collectively lost 21 lbs (1.29% of their total body weight), but since they lost the challenge, they have a total weight loss of 18 lbs (1.1%). The Blue Team surpassed the weight loss of Red Team with 1.24% (excluding Larry and Eric's weight). Sharon Cuneta broke three surprising news. It is a non-elimination night and therefore none of the Red Team has to go. The Blue Team will receive P100,000 for winning the weigh-in. In addition, the teams were dissolved and everyone began to play as individuals with their own T-shirt color.

=== Week 6 ===
- Episode 26: Alan, Angela, Eric, Joy and Larry received their prize money. They decided to send out the money accompanied with a personalized letter to their loved ones. In a fun game of frisbee, Alan and Raffy were the captains of their respective old (Blue and Red) teams. Raffy's team won the game and given a prize of a frisbee signed by The Philippine Frisbee team. Hazel was picked as the MVP and awarded with a prize that Hazel should take care and will be useful in the coming days. Because the team system was removed, the contestants were given their own individual color. The contestants attended a nutrition lesson by Nadine Tengco and Barni Alejandro. The male and female contestants were trained by Jim Saret and Chinggay Andrada, respectively.
- Episode 27: Eric received a grocery spree for his family after winning the Biggest Loser of the week. The contestants faced their first individual challenge. They have to walk across the pool get 50 bags (one at a time) and placed it in the basket at their starting positions. Hazel was given a one bag advantage as her prize for the frisbee game. Alan finished first and picked immunity as his prize. Raffy was awarded with video massage from his friends and loved ones and Art received a two pounds advantage for the weigh-in. Hazel and Winwin finished last and were tasked to wash, dry and iron the clothes of everyone for one week.
- Episode 28: The contestants had their cinematic experience watching their transformation from the start of the show to where they are right now. They also had their last chance workout for the first individual weigh-in the next day.
- Episode 29: Contestants weigh-in for the first time as individuals. Larry loses the most this week and is under the 200s. During the weigh-in, Eric loses his self-confidence and expresses his feeling of going back to his old self in case he leaves the show that night. The other contestants, including the host urge Eric to continue his weight loss journey whatever the result may be. Eric and Angela had the least weight loss percentage and fell below the yellow line.
- Episode 30: In the first yellow line elimination ceremony, Larry broke the split vote sending Eric home with 5–4, in favor of Angela. Jim had a pep talk with Eric. Eric apologizes to the viewers and particularly to the host because of his doubtfulness, and promises everyone that he will continue his weight loss journey at home.

=== Week 7 ===
- Episode 31: The contestants were not allowed to use the gym and were forced to find alternative means to exercise. Chinggay visited Leigh and Andy. As the Biggest Loser of the Week, Larry was given a tough decision to give a two pounds disadvantage to someone who sees as his threat - Raffy.
- Episode 32: It is Sports Day. The contestants were separated into two groups. Larry, Eboy, Ryan, Angela and Art experienced boxing with Chinggay. Jim with Jasmine Alkhaldi (swimming), Julius Nierras (sprinting) and Dylan Ababou (basketball) had a fun sports day with Alan, Raffy, Hazel, Joy and Winwin. Art and Winwin were awarded with a gym pass.
- Episode 33: Winwin and Art made use of their gym pass. Raffy talked to Eboy with regards to his feelings towards Hazel. With the help of other girls, Raffy left a kalachuchi in Hazel's locker to ask for a dinner date with her. Chinggay and Jim challenged the contestants with a quiz game, answerable with True or False. Each contestant started carrying an empty water container. For every incorrect answer, a liter of water will be added in the container. If the container fell on the floor and/or was not held properly, the contestant will be out of the game. Hazel won the quiz game, receiving a gym pass and the power to team up others in the next challenge, as well as choose her own partner. Hazel asked for Raffy's advice for how she should pair up the contestants for next challenge.
- Episode 34: In the absence of the Game Master, the two trainers facilitated the big challenge of the week. Hazel paired up the contestants. Joy and Art, after making the best guess of the calorie count of the double patty burger, fries and soda, decided which pair will carry the 1 ton of tires (Larry and Eboy), weights (Hazel and Raffy), cement bags (Joy and Art), logs (Winwin and Alan) and bricks (Angela and Ryan) from the starting point to designated platform. Hazel and Raffy, as the winning pair, won a 4-pound advantage. This nullified Raffy's 2 pound disadvantage. Ryan and Angela finished last and will face an unrevealed consequence later on. Meanwhile, Hazel had a dinner date with Raffy.
- Episode 35: Contestants faced another competitive weigh in. Hazel narrowly escaped the yellow line. With her two-pound advantage, Joy and Winwin fell below the yellow line. Andy and Leigh joined Sharon in their first weigh-in.

=== Week 8 ===
- Episode 36: Andy and Leigh weigh in and lose 11.31% and 8.70%, respectively. Since Sharon kept her promise of letting them back in the game if they lost weight, both of them earned their second chance spot into the game. In a very emotional deliberation, Joy was eliminated with 5 votes, while Winwin remained in the camp with only receiving 2 votes. Andy and Leigh joined the remaining nine contestants in the elimination hall. Sharon explained that in the next weigh-in challenge, the new contestants will compete against two original contestants. The person to be eliminated will be decided based on whichever team (Andy and Leigh vs the original team) loses out in the competitive weigh-in. In the next big challenge, Ryan and Angela have to face Andy and Leigh to determine which of the pair from original team will compete against the newbies.
- Episode 37: Andy and Leigh were officially welcomed by the original contestants. Chinggay trained the newbies while the rest were with Jim. Jim was emotional after Joy's elimination, and he explained to the remaining contestants why he thought Joy should have been the one to stay.
- Episode 38: In the Big Challenge, Andy and Leigh had to compete against Ryan and Angela in three challenges. Ryan and Angela won two challenges - first pair to finish 150 burpees and hold the gym ball above the head the longest while balancing on a piece of wood. Andy and Leigh won only one of the challenges, which is the first pair to collect 20 medicine balls scattered around the gym and placed on a designated rack. Ryan and Angela now have the power to choose who will go up against Andy and Leigh in the upcoming weigh-in.
- Episode 39: It was decided that Ryan and Eboy will compete against Andy and Leigh in the next weigh-in. In the temptation challenge, Ryan, Eboy, Leigh and Andy had to visit street food, fast food and dim sum stations. Ryan decided to give into the temptation, taking in 580 kcal. In return, Ryan will receive a 5-pound advantage for the weigh-in. As the Biggest Loser of the Week, Alan was visited by his wife, Caroline.
- Episode 40: The duos of Andy/Leigh and Eboy/Ryan weigh in. Despite Ryan's five pound advantage to both of their weight loss total, Andy/Leigh won the weigh-in and therefore Eboy/Ryan and the rest of the contestants will face the scale and one of them will be out of the game.

=== Week 9 ===
- Episode 41: The remaining contestants faced the weigh-in, as per usual. The Blue and Red team leaders (Alan and Art) fell below the yellow line. Voting was strictly strategic by their team color, in addition Andy and Leigh voted with the majority of the Red Team who voted for Alan to go. Alan was eliminated with five votes. Before he left, Alan decided to give away his yellow T-shirt to Art as a sign of teamwork and friendly Red/Blue competition throughout the game.
- Episode 42: The remaining members of the former Red Team decided to make Angela and Larry feel that there is no longer team mentality. The contestants were delighted to find out that their old clothes were no longer fit to them. Upon visiting the kitchen, they were surprised to find that only the recipe and ingredients for vegetable congee. The game master paid them a visit to introduce a series of "real life challenges" that could win them some food. Eboy, Andy, Leigh, Ryan and Winwin volunteered to compete against two veteran workers in ice plantation. They have to carry and deliver 30 blocks of ice with a weight of 150 kilograms from ice plant to Biggest Loser camp. While transferring the block of ice out of the truck, Eboy accidentally stuck his hand in between two ice blocks, causing him to be moved to hospital for medical attention. As a result of not winning the game, the contestants have to endure eating the basic food.
- Episode 43: Eboy stayed in the hospital to have his hand checked by a specialist. Art, Raffy, Hazel and Larry went out for a poultry challenge. The group had to collect 40 trays of eggs under 1 hour without breaking more than three eggs. The contestants succeeded in the challenge and were rewarded with some food.
- Episode 44: Eboy suffered an emotional breakdown as Coach Jim tried to push hard on his weight loss. Larry, Angela, Raffy, Andy and Art faced the challenge of putting in tires on trucks in less than an hour. The team won the challenge and was rewarded with a chicken paella served by Chef Violet.
- Episode 45: The remaining contestants were given a treat of make-over. Eboy felt alienated, despite his big weight loss, he was still unable to buy clothes off the rack. The top 10 contestants were introduced in a catwalk, boosting their morale to work harder for their weight loss.

=== Week 10 ===
- Episode 46: In the absence of Sharon, Derek hosted this week's weigh-in. Winwin and Eboy fell below the yellow line and subsequently, Eboy was booted out of the camp, after receiving a majority vote. Angela rejoiced as she became the first female contestant to get the Biggest Loser of the Week status.
- Episode 47: The contestants woke up in shock with Marines as their new trainers. They were sent out to the Basic School, the training ground for Philippine Marines. During one of the challenges, Leigh broke down and recalled her father's Air Force experience.
- Episode 48: The contestants continued their training at the Marines' camp. Winwin was excused for their first obstacle course challenge. Hazel and Leigh finished last and was given a punishment of picking trash and putting to designated area. Larry topped the challenge. The contestants had a taste how Marines eat their lunch.
- Episode 49: In the big challenge, the contestants were put into teams of three. In each team, the contestants had to place rifles in a tray while pulling a weight of 20% their own weight. Hazel, Ryan and Larry won in their heats respectively, and faced each other in the final round. In the final round the objectives were the same although the weight that they had to pull increased to 30% of their own weight. Larry beat the other two and received immunity for the next elimination.
- Episode 50:

=== Week 11 ===
- Episode 51: It is the day before the contestants leave the Philippine Marines camp. Winwin and Leigh, because of losing last week's challenge, are forced to wash the dishes.
- Episode 52: The contestants prepare to leave the Philippine Marines camp and Angela, since she was the Biggest Loser last week, is rewarded by seeing her husband, Angelito.
- Episode 53: The contestants weigh in, and once again, Derek hosts the weigh-in. Larry gets the Biggest Loser of the Week title for the third time. Winwin and Hazel fall below the yellow line after both gained one pound. Hazel is eliminated and Winwin is able to stay in the competition with only one vote.
- Episode 54: Contestants return to the campus after Hazel's elimination. In this week's immunity challenge, the first two contestants to lose two percent of their body weight will earn immunity. The twist is that they have to find out their weight loss via a mock scale in the gym, and contestants only have one chance to weigh in for the immunity. Contestants can weigh in at any time. In addition, this week, four contestants will drop below the yellow line. Art was the first to achieve the goal (5.44%) and won immunity.
- Episode 55: Chinggay hosted this week's big challenges. Ryan won the first challenge while Winwin won the second challenge and won immunity for the next elimination.

=== Week 12 ===
- Episode 56: Contestants weigh-in and were told that they lost the most percentage of weight loss than any other single week. The four contestants who dropped below the yellow line were Angela, Andy, Raffy and Leigh. At the elimination ceremony, three votes were revealed in eliminating Andy.
- Episode 57:
- Episode 58:
- Episode 59:
- Episode 60: Contestants are forced to decide whether to go to Manila for exercise with the trainers or to Enchanted Kingdom in Laguna for fun with their loved ones. The contestants decide to go to Laguna.

=== Week 13 ===
- Episode 61:
- Episode 62:
- Episode 63:
- Episode 64:
- Episode 65:

=== Week 14 ===
- Episode 66: Contestants have their weekly weigh-in and three people are safe from elimination. Winwin is eliminated with only 2 votes while both Ryan and Angela get only one vote.
- Episode 67: The contestants meet their loved ones. Raffy wins this week's first Big Challenge.
- Episode 68: It is another meeting with the contestants' loved ones. The weekly temptation is in and another challenge, which involves Leigh experiencing difficulty and gives up. The contestants' prize is their loved ones.
- Episode 69: The remaining contestants have to run to the 32nd floor of a building (which includes one of the season's winner's prizes) using only the stairs.
- Episode 70: Contestants weigh in for the next week. There is also a red line because of a double elimination. Leigh falls below this line and got eliminated. Ryan and Angela fell below the yellow line.

=== Week 15 ===
- Episode 71: Contestants start their elimination ceremony. Ryan is eliminated with 2 votes. All eliminated contestants meet at Cebu with Jim.
- Episode 72: The 12 eliminated contestants enter the mansion. Sharon says that only one of them will go back into the competition. The eliminated contestants will have their weigh-in first. Andy and Winwin are both eliminated because they added more weight.
- Episode 73: The other contestants weigh-in, but not the 4 remaining competitors. The 14 contestants (because of Andy and Winwin's elimination last episode) start to reunite.
- Episode 74: The 10 ex-contestants have challenges. Eboy, because he has medical problems, will not compete for the second chance. After challenges, 3 females, Destiny, Leigh and Joy, were also eliminated.
- Episode 75: The contestants faced their big challenge. They needed to cycle until 10 light bulbs were lighten which is 10 km. The challengers were the Big 4 against Edden, Eric, JM and Alan. JM was first to finish then Art so Raffy went on then Larry finished and Angela went on. Edden finished then Alan came and went but the ex-contestants lost and top 4 voted Alan out.

=== Week 16 ===
- Episode 76: The eliminated contestants find a big dangerous challenge. Ryan wins this challenge. JM lost the challenge and was eliminated.
- Episode 77: It was Hazel's birthday and the contestants went on the weigh-in. Hazel beats Eric by .05% with a total of 4.40%, the other three have the total percentages: 4.35% (Eric), 3.08% (Ryan), and 2.78% (Edden). Hazel got back into the game while Raffy won from the top 4 and was the first to advance to the grand finale.
- Episode 78: Contestants celebrate for being the Fab 5.
- Episode 79: It is the final Big Challenge for the Final 5.
- Episode 80: The 5 contestants were given treat of makeover for the Grand Ball. They had their haircuts at the house with the owner of Artista Salon. And have a serenity relaxation at a spa-like room.

=== Week 17 ===
- Episode 81: The contestants celebrate the grand ball. Their family and friends were also there.
- Episode 82: The Fab 5 weigh in. Hazel and Raffy escaped the yellow line. Sharon surprised them with good news, nobody will go home. Bad news, they will leave the Biggest Loser camp.
- Episode 83: The 5 contestants pack their things up and prepared to go back to where they started. Sharon hopes to meet them again at the grand finale.
- Episode 84: This is Hazel's journey outside the camp. She introduced Raffy to her family members.
- Episode 85: It's Raffy's turn to experience his journey outside the Biggest Loser camp, such as celebrating a parade, visiting the graves of his parents and even great when he invited Hazel along with him.

=== Week 18 (Finale) ===
- Episode 86: This time it is Larry's adventure outside the camp.
- Episode 87: It's Angela's turn outside the camp.
- Episode 88: This is the journey of the final contestant, Art.
- Episode 89: Recap episode
- Episode 90: Recap episode

== See also ==
- List of programs broadcast by ABS-CBN
- The Biggest Loser
