= Myrtle Sarrosa =

Filipina cosplayer and actress (born 1994)

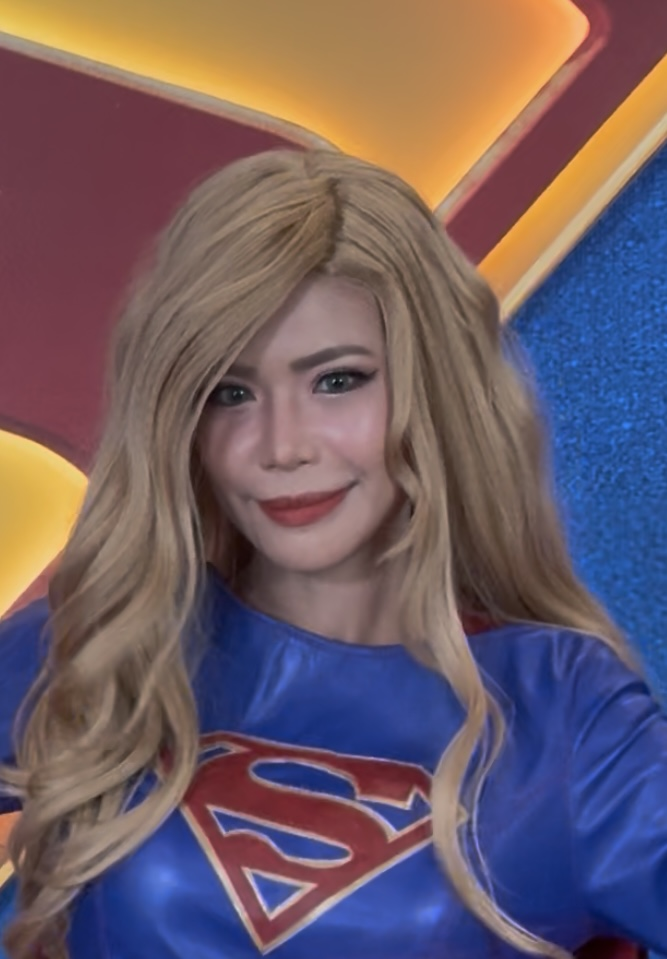
- Sarrosa cosplaying as Supergirl in 2025
- Born: Myrtle Abigail Porlucas Sarrosa; December 7, 1994 (age 31); Iloilo City, Philippines
- Education: University of the Philippines Diliman (BA)
- Occupations: Cosplayer; actress; singer; VJ; dancer; gamer
- Years active: 2012–present
- Agents: Star Magic (2012–2020) Sparkle GMA Artist Center; (2020–present)
- Musical career
- Genres: Pop
- Instrument: Vocals
- Labels: Ivory Music & Video (2016–present)

Myrtle Abigail Porlucas Sarrosa (born December 7, 1994) is a Filipino actress, cosplayer, and recording artist who rose to prominence after winning Pinoy Big Brother: Teen Edition 4 (2012). Sarrosa started her career as a cosplayer where she was launched as one of the "Star Magic Angels". She is currently managed and under contract with GMA's Sparkle Artist Center.

== Personal life ==
Myrtle Sarrosa was born to politician Rodolfo Sarrosa Jr., and accountant Tam Porlucas. Sarrosa was born and raised in Iloilo City. Ever since she was in elementary school, Sarrosa has been a self-proclaimed otaku and cosplays as her favorite anime and manga characters. At the age of fourteen, she started participating in cosplay conventions and won several awards for cosplaying in the Philippines.

At 15 years old, Sarrosa served as the Sanggunian Kabataan president of her hometown Barotac Nuevo, where she also became the chairman of the Committee of Youth and Sports. Before joining Pinoy Big Brother: Teen Edition 4, Sarrosa was an accounting student at the University of the Philippines Visayas but transferred to the university's Diliman campus in 2013. Sarrosa worked as full-time actress and host while attending classes at the UP College of Mass Communication, where she graduated cum laude with a degree in Bachelor of Arts degree in broadcast communication.

== Career ==
Sarrosa joined Pinoy Big Brother: Teen Edition 4 in 2012. She was declared the "Big Winner" after garnering 33.92% percent of votes, winning over her competitors by a wide margin.

Sarrosa launched her acting and recording career in the Philippines immediately after winning Pinoy Big Brother (PBB). Sarrosa joined the cast of the Filipino television drama Kahit Puso'y Masugatan, together with her PBB co-competitors Kit Thompson and Yves Flores. Sarrosa became a regular performer for ABS-CBN's Sunday variety program ASAP.

During that same year, Sarrosa and Young JV released their digital single "Your Name", which ranked Number 1 on MYX. Later, Sarrosa became the official video jockey or "Anime Jockey" for Hero TV. Sarrosa was cast as Maristela on the Filipino comedy sitcom TodaMax.

In 2013, Sarrosa released a self-titled album under Star Records with the carrier single "Mr. Kupido", which earned her a nomination for Best New Female Recording Artist at the 9th PMPC Star Awards for Music. The official music video for her song starred Sarrosa and Enrique Gil. Sarrosa also became the resident judge and host of the Philippine's first cosplay show, iCosplay. Sarrosa then starred in the television series Moon of Desire (2014) as Anise and featured in an episode of the anthology series Ipaglaban Mo. She was also the cover girl for the November 2014 issue of FHM Philippines.

In 2015, Sarrosa became a regular feature and travel host for the morning news program Umagang Kay Ganda and became the main female presenter for basketball, volleyball and cheer dance for the National Collegiate Athletic Association during Seasons 91 and 92. Sarrosa also became one of the eight celebrity performers on the second season of the show, Your Face Sounds Familiar. She was also joined by James Reid and Nadine Lustre for Maalaala Mo Kaya's Valentines special "Signs of Love" and joined Enrique Gil and Liza Soberano in the television series Forevermore. She also became a part of the fourth batch of lucky stars in the game show Kapamilya Deal or No Deal, where she donated her winnings to 29 daycare centers in her home province. In that same year, Sarrosa returned to ASAP as one of the "Star Magic Angels", where she was titled the "Playful Angel".

In 2016, Sarrosa became the host of Hero TV's flagship show My Hero Nation. She also launched her second album under Ivory Music & Video entitled Now Playing: Myrtle which was certified gold by the Philippine Association of the Record Industry. She released the song "Mr. Pakipot" as her album's first single. Aside from writing all her songs from her album, she also wrote the songs "Lampara" and "Magkaibang Mundo" together with Jonathan Ong for Jennylyn Mercado's album Ultimate and Maja Salvador's single "Haplos". Sarrosa also became a regular cast member of the family fantasy show My Super D.

In 2017, Sarrosa starred in the TV film AFGITMOLFM where she was partnered with Richard Juan and Kino Rementilla. She also became the host of another Hero TV program, Hero Tambayan. She also launched the single "LABEL" featuring Abra, which won the Favorite Music Video Award during the 30th Awit Awards. Sarrosa was cast as an antagonist in La Luna Sangre before joining the cast of The Good Son. In the same year, she also starred in another controversial Ipaglaban Mo! episode entitled "Tuliro" where she played the role of a schizophrenic.

Sarrosa was once again the cover girl for the February 2018 issue of FHM Philippines and became the 2018 calendar girl of Ginebra San Miguel. She also became a host of the sports program The First Five and served as the muse for the Barangay Ginebra San Miguel basketball team in the 2017–18 PBA season opening ceremony.

In 2020, Sarrosa moved to GMA Network after eight years of being an ABS-CBN talent. She initially portrayed the antagonistic role as Judy Enriquez, a Montaire's family friend, in the Philippine drama remake series Nagbabagang Luha (2021). In 2024, she played the lead antagonist role as Portia Terra, the group leader of the rich bullies known as the "Crazy 5" aiming to torment Amira (played by Elle Villanueva) in the afternoon drama revenge series Makiling (2024). In 2025, she joined the cast of My Ilonggo Girl to play the main antagonist role as Venice Hermoso-Palma.

== Discography ==
=== Albums ===
- Myrtle Sarrosa (Self Titled Album) (2013)
- Now Playing: Myrtle (2016) – Certified Gold Award by PARI in October 2016

=== Singles ===
- Heartbroken

=== As songwriter ===
- "Lampara" – Jennylyn Mercado
- "Magkaibang Mundo" – Jennylyn Mercado
- "Haplos" – Maja Salvador

== Filmography ==
=== Film ===
Year	Title	Role
2014	Lola	Jessica
2014	Once A Princess	Helen
2015	Just The Way You Are	Bea
2017	Haunted Forest	Lorena
2018	Wander Bra	Wander Bra (Barbara)
2018	Recipe For Love	Ava
2019	Papa Pogi	Helena
2019	Ang Henerasyong Sumuko Sa Love	Junamae Quiambao
2019	The Annulment	Veronique
2020	Block Z	Vanessa
2020	James & Pat & Dave	Sandra

=== Television ===
Year	Title	Role
2012	Pinoy Big Brother: Teen Edition 4	Herself (contestant; winner)
2012–20	ASAP	Herself
2012–13	Kahit Puso'y Masugatan	Monique Santos
2012–13	Toda Max	Tita Maristela
2013	Maalaala Mo Kaya: Family Picture	Gina
2014	Moon of Desire	Anise
2014	Maalaala Mo Kaya: Sulat	Kate
2014	Ipaglaban Mo: Love Ko Si Sir	Dolly Ramos
2015	Umagang Kay Ganda	Herself (host)
2015	Kapamilya, Deal or No Deal	Briefcase No. 11
2015	Maalaala Mo Kaya: Stuffed Toy	Carmina
2015	Forevermore	Jessica
2015	Luv U	Krista
2015	Your Face Sounds Familiar 2	Herself (performer)
2016	FPJ's Ang Probinsyano	Doreen Villaluna
2016	Ipaglaban Mo: Hayok	Ellen
2016	My Super D	Cherry
2016	Family Feud	Herself (contestant)
2016	Minute to Win It	Herself (contestant)
2017	Maalaala Mo Kaya: Makeup	Beth
2017	AFGITMOLFM	Ianne
2017	La Luna Sangre	Therine
2017	Ipaglaban Mo: Tuliro	Monica
2018	The Good Son	Vangie
2018	Precious Hearts Romances Presents: Araw Gabi	Teen Celestina
2019	Wansapanataym: Mr. CUTEpido	Gretchen Galvez
2020	Bubble Gang	Herself (guest)
2020	Tadhana	Elisa
2021	Nagbabagang Luha	Judy Enriquez
2024	Makiling	Portia Salamanca-Terra
2024	It's Showtime	Herself (performer)
2025	My Ilonggo Girl	Venice Hermoso-Palma

== Awards and nominations ==
Year	Organisation	Award	Work	Result
2012	Pinoy Big Brother: Teen Edition 4	Big Winner	Herself	Won
2012	ASAP Pop Viewer's Choice Awards 2012	Pop Female Cutie	Herself	Won
2012	26th PMPC Star Awards for Television	Best New Female TV Personality	Toda Max	Nominated
2012	10th Golden Screen Awards	Outstanding Breakthrough Performance by an Actress	Toda Max	Nominated

Preceded by Slater Young	Pinoy Big Brother; Big Winner; 2012	Succeeded by (Brazil) Daniel Matsunaga
Preceded by (Australia) James Reid	Pinoy Big Brother Teens; Big Winner; 2012	Succeeded by Jimboy Martin
