= Kahit Puso'y Masugatan =

2012–13 Philippine television drama series

- Title card
- Also known as: Hearts on Fire
- Genre: Melodrama, Romance
- Created by: ABS-CBN Studios
- Based on: Pinulot Ka Lang sa Lupa (1987) by Ishmael Bernal
- Written by: John Roque; Jaja Amarillo; Honey Hidalgo; Rhoda Tanyag
- Directed by: Wenn V. Deramas
- Creative director: Johnny delos Santos
- Starring: Iza Calzado; Andi Eigenmann; Jake Cuenca; Gabby Concepcion
- Opening theme: "Sayang" by Zsa Zsa Padilla
- Composer: Claire de la Fuente
- Country of origin: Philippines
- Original language: Filipino
- No. of episodes: 150 (list of episodes)

Production
- Executive producers: Carlo Katigbak; Cory Vidanes; Laurenti Dyogi; Ginny Monteagudo-Ocampo
- Producers: Minella Abad; Mark Anthony Gile; Marie Kris Macas
- Cinematography: Algin Siscar; Elmer Despa
- Editors: Joy Buenaventura; Oden Lazatin; Jake Maderazo; Bren John de Leon; Russell Martinez
- Running time: 30-45 minutes
- Production company: GMO Drama Unit

Original release
- Network: ABS-CBN
- Release: July 9, 2012 – February 1, 2013

Kahit Puso'y Masugatan (International title: Hearts on Fire / transl. Even If the Heart is Scarred) is a Philippine television drama melodrama series broadcast by ABS-CBN. Directed by Wenn V. Deramas, it stars Iza Calzado, Andi Eigenmann, Jake Cuenca and Gabby Concepcion. It aired on the network's Primetime Bida line up and worldwide on TFC from July 9, 2012 to February 1, 2013, replacing Pinoy Big Brother: Teen Edition 4 and was replaced by Apoy sa Dagat.

== Plot ==
As if things weren't complicated enough as they are, Rafael faces a dilemma of his own as his wealthy father Miguel (Gabby Concepcion) falls for Andrea and even asks her hand in marriage. The plot thickens when Andrea also falls for Miguel, her ex-boyfriend's father, and she is willing to take the risk for Miguel and fight for their love no matter what, after all, love is all about risk. This complicated situation is explored in the subsequent parts of the story.

== Cast and characters ==
=== Main cast ===
- Iza Calzado as Andrea San Jose-de Guzman
- Andi Eigenmann as Veronica Salvacion
- Jake Cuenca as Rafael de Guzman
- Gabby Concepcion as Miguel de Guzman

=== Supporting cast ===
- Barbara Perez as Doña Cleotilde Canlas
- Jaclyn Jose as Esther Gerona-Espiritu
- Malou de Guzman as Madonna Toledo
- Cris Villanueva as Dr. Bong Madriaga
- DJ Durano as Luis Gerona
- Jenny Miller as Salve Gerona
- Joey Paras as Brian
- Marx Topacio as Balong
- Pamu Pamorada as Rebecca "Bekka" Espiritu
- Kit Thompson as Alberto "Ambet" Espiritu
- Myrtle Sarrosa as Monique Santos
- Yves Flores as Mico

=== Guest cast ===
- Lito Pimentel as Antonio "Tony" Espiritu
- Robi Domingo as Gerald Fernandez
- Alex Castro as Christian Morales
- Edward Mendez as Cong. Salcedo
- Matthew Mendoza as Jerome Fernandez
- Frances Ignacio as Amanda Balmaceda
- Maricar de Mesa as Melanie Espiritu
- Helga Krapf as Vangie Morales
- Lemuel Pelayo as Mark Castillo
- Wendy Valdez as Wilma
- Carlo Romero as Joaquin
- Jose Sarasola as Aaron
- Eagle Riggs as Frida
- Dang Cruz as Tonya
- Johan Santos as Winston
- Manuel Chua as Jeff
- Tess Antonio as Ethel
- Andre Tiangco as ER Doctor
- Joko Diaz as Eric
- Marc Solis as Marco Abraham
- Roldan Aquino as Major

=== Special participation ===
- Mylene Dizon as Fatima San Jose
- Assunta De Rossi as Belen Salvacion
- Mickey Ferriols as Grace de Guzman
- Issa Pressman as preteen Andrea
- Jairus Aquino as preteen Balong
- Carlo Lacana as preteen Rafael
- Andrea Brillantes as young Veronica (credited as Blythe Gorostiza)
- Dexie Daulat as young Andrea
- Cajo Gomez as young Rafael
- Khaycee Aboloc as young Bekka
- Nikki Bagaporo as Weng

== Soundtrack ==
The drama's main theme song is "Sayang" by Zsa Zsa Padilla. Insert songs also include "Bakit Ba Minamahal Kita?" by Angeline Quinto and "Hindi Na Magbabago" by Erik Santos.

== Reruns ==
The show began airing reruns on Jeepney TV from January 11 to April 16, 2021; August 29, 2022 to March 17, 2023; and July 7, 2025 to January 23, 2026.

== See also ==
- List of programs broadcast by ABS-CBN
- List of ABS-CBN Studios original drama series
- List of programs broadcast by Jeepney TV
