= List of Sino ang Maysala?: Mea Culpa episodes =

Sino ang Maysala?: Mea Culpa (lit. 'Who is the Offender? My Fault' / English: Mea Culpa) is a 2019 Philippine drama television series starring Jodi Sta. Maria, Bela Padilla, Ketchup Eusebio, Tony Labrusca, Kit Thompson, Sandino Martin and Ivana Alawi. The series aired on ABS-CBN's Primetime Bida evening block and worldwide via The Filipino Channel from April 29, 2019, to August 9, 2019, replacing Halik.

== Series overview ==
Season	Episodes	Originally released	
Season	Episodes	First released	Last released
1	75	April 29, 2019	August 9, 2019

== Episodes ==
=== Season 1 (2019) ===
No. overall	No. in season	Title	Original release date	Kantar Media Ratings (nationwide)
1	1	"Gabi ng Krimen"	April 29, 2019	22.2%
2	2	"Ebidensya"	April 30, 2019	19.8%
3	3	"Leyna"	May 1, 2019	17.2%
4	4	"Pag-Ampon"	May 2, 2019	19.3%
5	5	"Hukay"	May 3, 2019	18.0%
6	6	"Pag Asa"	May 6, 2019	18.2%
7	7	"Biktima"	May 7, 2019	17.5%
8	8	"Konektado"	May 8, 2019	16.9%
9	9	"Kuya Noah"	May 9, 2019	16.5%
10	10	"Interogasyon"	May 10, 2019	14.7%
11	11	"Hinala"	May 13, 2019	16.7%
12	12	"Puntirya"	May 14, 2019	19.6%
13	13	"Kabado"	May 15, 2019	18.9%
14	14	"Subpoena"	May 16, 2019	21.3%
15	15	"Sugod"	May 17, 2019	19.2%
16	16	"Makapangyarihan"	May 20, 2019	20.0%
17	17	"Amor"	May 21, 2019	20.1%
18	18	"Manifesto"	May 22, 2019	18.1%
19	19	"May Laban"	May 23, 2019	16.7%
20	20	"Katotohanan"	May 24, 2019	17.4%
21	21	"Child Trafficking"	May 27, 2019	16.8%
22	22	"Pakiusap"	May 28, 2019	18.2%
23	23	"Banta"	May 29, 2019	17.1%
24	24	"Pakana"	May 30, 2019	16.6%
25	25	"Konsensya"	May 31, 2019	15.9%
26	26	"Tampo"	June 3, 2019	16.1%
27	27	"Dalaw"	June 4, 2019	17.4%
28	28	"Palaban"	June 5, 2019	14.5%
29	29	"Paalam, Papay"	June 6, 2019	17.1%
30	30	"Pagluluksa"	June 7, 2019	16.2%
31	31	"Matilda"	June 10, 2019	16.2%
32	32	"Yakap"	June 11, 2019	18.0%
33	33	"Duda"	June 12, 2019	15.0%
34	34	"Imbitasyon"	June 13, 2019	15.0%
35	35	"Binyag"	June 14, 2019	15.9%
36	36	"Custody"	June 17, 2019	17.7%
37	37	"Tulong"	June 18, 2019	18.7%
38	38	"Bayaran"	June 19, 2019	16.0%
39	39	"Diskubre"	June 20, 2019	14.8%
40	40	"Kriminal"	June 21, 2019	17.7%
41	41	"Ina"	June 24, 2019	16.7%
42	42	"Sampal"	June 25, 2019	16.6%
43	43	"Sumbong"	June 26, 2019	15.4%
44	44	"Proteksyon"	June 27, 2019	17.2%
45	45	"Kakampi"	June 28, 2019	15.7%
46	46	"Kapalit"	July 1, 2019	16.1%
47	47	"Koneksyon"	July 2, 2019	16.5%
48	48	"Dukot"	July 3, 2019	16.9%
49	49	"Hanapin"	July 4, 2019	15.5%
50	50	"Kulong"	July 5, 2019	15.6%
51	51	"Bisita"	July 8, 2019	16.8%
52	52	"Takas"	July 9, 2019	17.8%
53	53	"Petisyon"	July 10, 2019	16.9%
54	54	"Sapilitan"	July 11, 2019	18.4%
55	55	"Testigo"	July 12, 2019	16.7%
56	56	"Laban"	July 15, 2019	18.7%
57	57	"Suhol"	July 16, 2019	18.1%
58	58	"Hatol"	July 17, 2019	18.8%
59	59	"Sundo"	July 18, 2019	17.8%
60	60	"Silip"	July 19, 2019	18.7%
61	61	"Lasing"	July 22, 2019	15.3%
62	62	"Tangka"	July 23, 2019	17.0%
63	63	"Aprubado"	July 24, 2019	18.6%
64	64	"Isiwalat"	July 25, 2019	17.3%
65	65	"Distansya"	July 26, 2019	16.3%
66	66	"Bulgar"	July 29, 2019	16.7%
67	67	"Suplong"	July 30, 2019	17.5%
68	68	"Suspendido"	July 31, 2019	18.1%
69	69	"Trahedya"	August 1, 2019	18.0%
70	70	"Bistado"	August 2, 2019	19.0%
71	71	"Ganti"	August 5, 2019	20.9%
72	72	"Arestado"	August 6, 2019	19.7%
73	73	"Anunsyo"	August 7, 2019	18.9%
74	74	"Rebelasyon"	August 8, 2019	21.2%
75	75	"Ang Huling Hatol"	August 9, 2019	25.1%
