= List of Kahit Puso'y Masugatan episodes =

Kahit Puso'y Masugatan (Lit: Even If You Break My Heart / English: Hearts on Fire) is a 2012 Philippine melodrama television series directed by Wenn V. Deramas, topbilled by Gabby Concepcion, Jake Cuenca, Andi Eigenmann and Iza Calzado. The series aired on ABS-CBN's Primetime Bida evening block and worldwide on The Filipino Channel from July 9, 2012 to February 1, 2013, replacing Pinoy Big Brother: Teen Edition 4.

== Series overview ==
Month	Episodes	Total Episodes
July 2012	17	150
August 2012	23	150
September 2012	20	150
October 2012	23	150
November 2012	22	150
December 2012	21	150
January 2013	23	150
February 2013	1	150

== Episodes ==
=== July 2012 ===
Episodes	Title	Original air date	Kantar Media Rating (Nationwide)	Source
1.	'"Andrea and Victoria Grows Up as Best Friends"' (Andrea at Victoria ay Lumalaki bilang Kaibigan)	July 9, 2012	10.9%	
2.	'"Belen Will Leave Veronica Behind to Provide Better Things for Her"' (Belen Makakaapekto ba ang Mag-iwan Veronica Sa likod sa Magbigay ng Better Bagay para sa kanyang)	July 10, 2012	9.4%	
3.	'"Veronica Worries About Her Mom's Safety Abroad"' (Veronica alalahanin tungkol sa Kaligtasan sa kanyang Nanay sa Ibang Bansa)	July 11, 2012	9.9%	
4.	'"Andrea and Veronica Will Fall in the Hands of Criminals"' (Andrea at Veronica Makakaapekto ba ang mahulog sa mga Kamay ng Kriminal)	July 12, 2012	10.4%	
5.	'"Veronica and Andrea Go Their Separate Ways"' (Andrea at Veronica pumunta hiwalay na paraan)	July 13, 2012	12.1%	
6.	'"Veronica Wants to Find Andrea"' (Nais Veronica upang Maghanap Andrea)	July 16, 2012	10.4%	
7.	'"Veronica Is Still Troubled with Her Past"' (Veronica Ay Pa Problema sa pamamagitan ng Kanyang Nakalipas)	July 17, 2012	11.0%	
8.	'"Veronica Can't Hide Her Feelings for Rafael"' (Veronica Hindi Itago Ang kanyang damdamin para sa Rafael)	July 18, 2012	11.2%	
9.	'"Andrea Is Shocked with Veronica's Reaction"' (Andrea Ay Gulat Na May Ni Veronica Reaksyon)	July 19, 2012	10.5%	
10.	'"Rafael Spends the Day with Veronica"' (Rafael Gumastos Araw na may Veronica	July 20, 2012	10.5%	
11.	'"Veronica Is Determined to Have Rafael's Affection"' (Veronica Ay Determinadong Magkaroon ni Rafael Affection)	July 23, 2012	9.2%	
12.	'"Andrea Is Determined to Have Rafael's Affection"' (Andrea Ay Determinadong Magkaroon ni Rafael Affection)	July 24, 2012	10.4%	
13.	'"Rafael Is Very Persistent in Courting Andrea"' (Rafael Is Very Persistent in Courting Andrea)	July 25, 2012	10.3%	
14.	'"Rafael Might Lose Andrea Because of His Actions"' (Rafael Maaaring Mawalan Andrea Dahil sa Kanyang GawaRafael Maaaring Mawalan Andrea Dahil sa Kanyang Gawa)	July 26, 2012	10.0%	
15.	'"Veronica Discovers the Identity of Rafael's Special Girl"' (Veronica Nadiskubre ang Identity ng espesyal babae ni Rafael)	July 27, 2012	10.3%	
16.	'"Veronica Can't Believe That Rafael Is Fond of Her Sister"' (Veronica Hindi Maniwala ka Iyon Rafael Ay Mahilig ng niya Kapatid)	July 30, 2012	10.7%	
17.	'"Miguel and Rafael Tries to Win Andrea's Trust Back"' (Miguel at Rafael Sinusubukang Manalo ni Andrea tiwala Bumalik)	July 31, 2012	10.2%	

=== August 2012 ===
Episodes	Title	Original air date	Kantar Media Rating (Nationwide)	Source
18.	'"Will Andrea Have the Heart to Forgive Miguel and Rafael?"' (Makakaapekto Andrea May mga Puso Magpatawad Miguel at Rafael?)	August 1, 2012	11.7%	
19.	'"Veronica Is Willing to Let Go of Her Feelings for Rafael for Andrea's Sake"'' (Veronica Ay Handang Hayaan Pumunta ng kanyang damdamin para sa Rafael para sa Sake ni Andrea)	August 2, 2012	9.6%	
20.	'"Rafael Has a Surprise for Andrea"' (Rafael May isang sorpresa para sa Andrea)	August 3, 2012	10.3%	
21.	'"Miguel Can't Forget How She Treated Andrea"' (Miguel Hindi Kalimutan Paano Siya Itinuturing Andrea)	August 6, 2012	10.5%	
22.	'"Andrea Can't Keep Her Mother in the Dark Anymore"' (Andrea Hindi Panatilihin ang Kanyang Ina sa Madilim Anymore)	August 7, 2012	9.5%	
23.	'"Veronica Gives Christian a Chance to Be Close with Her"' (Veronica Nagbibigay Christian isang Pagkakataong Maging Isara sa pamamagitan ng Kanyang)	August 8, 2012	10.1%	
24.	'"Andrea Knows That Her Big Secret Will Harm Her Whole Family"' (Andrea Knows That kanyang Big Lihim Makakaapekto Harm Ang kanyang Buong Family)	August 9, 2012	11.5%	
25.	'"Ester Is Full of Anger and Disappointment Over Her Failed Marriage"' (Ester Ay puno ng galit at Disappointment Sa paglipas Ang kanyang Nabigong aasawa)	August 10, 2012	10.3%	
26.	'"Ambet and Becca Wants to Talk to Their Father"' (Ambet at Bekka Nais na Makipag-usap sa kanilang mga Ama)	August 13, 2012	11.4%	
27.	'"Will Bekka Survive from the Accident?"' (Makakaapekto Bekka Matirang buhay mula sa Aksidente?)	August 14, 2012	10.2%	
28.	'"Andrea Has a Lot of Questions After Discovering That She Knows Rafael's Mistress"' (Andrea May isang Lot ng mga Tanong Pagkatapos pagtuklas That She Knows ni Rafael Maestra)	August 15, 2012	10.9%	
29.	'"Andrea Must Borrow a Huge Amount to Pay for Bekka's Medicines "' (Andrea Dapat Hiramin isang Napakalaki Halaga na Magbayad para ni Bekka Gamot)	August 16, 2012	10.5%	
30.	'"Veronica Tells Rafael That She Loves Him"' (Veronica Nagsasabi Rafael na Mahal Niya Siya)	August 17, 2012	11.5%	
31.	'"Andrea Is Ready to Take on Her New Job for Her Family"' (Andrea Ay Handa nang Dalhin sa Kanyang Bagong Job para sa Kanyang Pamilya)	August 20, 2012	11.5%	
32.	'"Andrea Keeps Her New Job from Rafael and Her Family"' (Andrea Pinapanatiling Ang kanyang Bagong Job mula Raphael at ng Kanyang Pamilya)	August 21, 2012	11.2%	
33.	'"Rafael Wants to Know Andrea's Secret"' (Rafael Nais Malaman ni Andrea Sekreto)	August 22, 2012	11.1%	
34.	'"Rafael Wants to Know Andrea's Secret 2"' (Rafael Nais Malaman ni Andrea Sekreto 2)	August 23, 2012	11.1%	
35.	'"Veronica Blames Herself for Christian's Death"' (Veronica blamed kanyang sarili dahil sa Christian Kamatayan)	August 24, 2012	11.3%	
36.	'"Rafael and Andrea Talk More About Their Upcoming Marriage"' (Rafael at Andrea Talk Higit pang mga Tungkol sa kanilang nalalapit na Kasal)	August 27, 2012	10.4%	
37.	'"Veronica Can't Bear Seeing Rafael and Andrea Together"' (Veronica Hindi Tumungo Nakakakita Rafael at Andrea Sama-sama)	August 28, 2012	10.9%	
38.	'"Veronica's Jealousy Will Lead Her to Danger"' (Ni Veronica Selos Makakaapekto ba ang Lead kanyang sa Panganib)	August 29, 2012	10.0%	
39.	'"Andrea Ends Her Relationship with Rafael for Veronica's Sake"' (Andrea Magtatapos Ang kanyang relasyon sa Rafael para ni Veronica Sake)	August 30, 2012	9.5%	
40.	'"Miguel Asks for Rafael and Veronica's Support to Help Andrea"' (Miguel Humihingi ng Rafael at Veronica ni Suporta sa Tulong Andrea)	August 31, 2012	10.0%	

=== September 2012 ===
Episodes	Title	Original air date	Kantar Media Rating (Nationwide)	Source
41.	'"Nothing Is Greater Than Andrea's Love for Her Family, Not Even Rafael"' (Wala nang Mas Kaysa Pag-ibig ni Andrea para sa kanyang Pamilya, Hindi Kahit Rafael)	September 3, 2012	8.4%	
42.	'"Veronica Pushes Rafael and Andrea to Their Limits"' (Veronica Pushes Rafael at Andrea sa kanilang mga Limitasyon)	September 4, 2012	9.9%	
43.	'"Andrea Can't Contain Her Anger for Veronica Anymore' (Andrea Hindi Maglaman Ang kanyang galit para sa Veronica Anymore)	September 5, 2012	9.2%	
44.	'"Andrea Takes Advantage of Rafael's Moment of Weakness"' (Andrea Dadalhin Kalamangan ng Rafael Sandali of ng Kahinaan)	September 6, 2012	10.0%	
45.	'"Will Veronica Succeed in Luring Rafael to Love Her?"' (Makakaapekto Veronica Magtagumpay sa Luring Rafael sa Mahal Her?)	September 7, 2012	9.3%	
46.	'"Hearts Cannot Stop from Bleeding and Veronica Made Sure That Andrea and Rafael's Wounds Will Not Easily Heal"'	September 10, 2012	9.6%	
47.	'"Veronica Will Not Stop with Her Obsession"'	September 11, 2012	10.3%	
48.	'"Veronica Will Not Stop with Her Obsession"'	September 12, 2012	10.3%	
49.	'"Rafael Discovers Andrea's Plan of Leaving"'	September 13, 2012	10.3%	
50.	'"Andrea Starts a New Life in Macau, But How Different Will It Be When She Meets Miguel?"'	September 14, 2012	10.8%	
51.	'"Rafael Is Miserable Without Andrea While Veronica Feels Victorious and Continues with Her Insanity"'	September 17, 2012	9.5%	
52.	'"Is It Just a Friendly Dinner or Is Miguel Starting to Become Someone Very Special for Andrea?"'	September 18, 2012	9.8%	
53.	'"Just When the Wound Is About to Heal a New One Arises"'	September 19, 2012	10.0%	
54.	'"Veronica Would Rather Die That Not Be with Rafael"'	September 20, 2012	11.3%	
55.	'"Andrea Returns Home to Put an End to Veronica's Insanity"'	September 21, 2012	10.4%	
56.	'"Andrea Is Ready to Face Rafael"'	September 24, 2012	10.8%	
57.	'"Rafael Finally Agrees to Veronica's Wish"'	September 25, 2012	9.7%	
58.	'"Rafael Starts to Punish Veronica"'	September 26, 2012	11.5%	
59.	'"Will Veronica Be Able to Last the Set-Up That She and Rafael Agreed Upon or Will She Finally Accept That Rafael Cannot Love Her?"'	September 27, 2012	11.5%	
60.	'"How Long Can Veronica Stay with Raphael?"'	September 28, 2012	11.3%	

=== October 2012 ===
Episodes	Title	Original air date	Kantar Media Rating (Nationwide)	Source
61.	"Andrea Starts to Work for Miguel"	October 1, 2012	10.6%	
62.	"Is It Purely Work or Does Miguel Want to See Andrea More Often?"	October 2, 2012	11.4%	
63.	"Raphael Punishes Veronica Even More, While Miguel Gives Andrea All the Help That Her Family Needs"	October 3, 2012	12.4%	
64.	"Veronica Finds Joy in Her New Job But This Only Irritates Raphael Even More"	October 4, 2012	13.1%	
65.	"Raphael Still Longs for Andrea and Still Blames Veronica for His Anguish"	October 5, 2012	12.2%	
66.	"Miguel Searches for Andrea's Father"	October 8, 2012	12.4%	
67.	"The Site of Andrea Still Fills Veronica with Hate"	October 9, 2012	13.4%	
68.	" Raphael Questions His Father for Hiring the Woman That Brought Him So Much Pain"	October 10, 2012	13.6%	
69.	"Andrea and Miguel Are Now Closer Than Ever While Raphael Watches from Afar"	October 11, 2012	13.4%	
70.	"The Attraction Seeps in and Miguel Can't Help It Anymore"	October 12, 2012	15.4%	
71.	"The Thought of Andrea and Miguel in Iligan Angers Raphael"	October 15, 2012	13.0%	
72.	"Is Miguel Ready to Love Andrea Even If He Loses His Son Raphael?"	October 16, 2012	11.1%	
73.	"Andrea and Miguel Are Very Concerned with What Raphael and Veronica Will Do Once They Find Out About Their Special Relationship"	October 17, 2012	12.5%	
74.	"Andrea and Miguel Open Their Hearts for Each Other"	October 18, 2012	14.8%	
75.	"Andrea Will Fight for Miguel Even If It Means Facing Veronica Once Again"	October 19, 2012	14.4%	
76.	"Miguel Decides to Be with Andrea Forever"	October 22, 2012	14.5%	
77.	"What Can Raphael Possibly Do Now That His Father and Andrea Are Deeply in Love?"	October 23, 2012	15.2%	
78.	"Miguel and Andrea Are Now Engaged and While Their Hearts Celebrate Raphael Is in Anguish"	October 24, 2012	11.9%	
79.	"What Can Raphael Do to Stop Andrea from Marrying His Father?"	October 25, 2012	13.3%	
80.	"Something Will Change in Veronica on Her Birthday"	October 26, 2012	14.1%	
81.	"Veronica Holds on to Raphael But Can the Baby Still Take All the Anguish"'	October 29, 2012	—N/a	—N/a
82.	"Miguel Is Torn Between His Love for His Children and Andrea"	October 30, 2012	11.9%	
83.	"Has Veronica Lost Her Baby?"	October 31, 2012	13.3%	

=== November/December 2012 ===
Week	Episodes	Title	Original air date	Kantar Media Average Weekly Rating (Nationwide)	Source
17	80-85	"Will Veronica lose her Baby with Rafael"	October 26-November 2, 2012	12.2%	—N/a
18	86-90	"An Investigation Starts When Somebody Rapes Andrea"	November 5–9, 2012	11.9%	—N/a
19	90-95	"Andrea decides to let go Miguel"	November 12–16, 2012	12.0%	—N/a
20	96-100	"Will Veronica and Andrea forgive each other?"	November 19–23, 2012	—N/a	—N/a
21	100-105	"Luis will uncover the truth about Andrea"	November 26–30, 2012	10.6%	—N/a
22	106-110	"Veronica will five her revenge"	December 3–7, 2012	10.8%	—N/a
23	111-115	"Hiding secrets will give big consequences"	December 10–14, 2012	—N/a	—N/a
24	116-120	"Veronica will do anything to get her revenge at Andrea"	December 17–21, 2012	—N/a	—N/a
25	121-125	"Andrea Decides to Leave Miguel and Will Veronica Take This as an Opportunity to Push with Her Plans?"	December 24–28, 2012	—N/a	—N/a
26	126-130	"Veronica and Belen time will begin"	Dec 31-January 4, 2013	—N/a	—N/a

=== January 2013 ===
Episodes	Title	Original air date	Kantar Media Rating (Nationwide)	Source
131-135	"Belen and Veronica will get revenge"	January 7–11, 2013	—N/a	—N/a
136.	"Will the Truth Behind Andrea's Sexual Assault Finally Unfold?"	January 14, 2013	—N/a	—N/a
137.	"How Will Miguel Accept the Fact That His Very Own Son Raped the Woman That He Loves?"	January 15, 2013	—N/a	—N/a
138.	"Ano ang kabayaran sa kasalanang nagawa ni Rafael?" (What is the payoff for the sin committed by Rafael?)	January 16, 2013	—N/a	—N/a
139.	"Andrea's World Is Falling Apart and Veronica Takes Advantage of the Situation"	January 17, 2013	10.7%	
140.	"Does Veronica Really Love Gerald?"	January 18, 2013	12.8%	
141.	"Andrea Gives Birth to Rafael's Son"	January 21, 2013	12.5%	
142.	"Miguel Wakes Up, But Will He Be the Same Man That Andrea Loves?"	January 22, 2013	11.0%	
143.	"It's the Start of a New Life for Andrea and Miguel But They Still Have to Face Raphael"	January 23, 2013	12.3%	
144.	"What's the Worst Thing That Veronica Can Do Once She Becomes a True De Guzman?"	January 24, 2012	11.4%	
145.	"Andrea's Son Is Missing and Rafael Becomes the Main Suspect, or Is Veronica Behind This?"	January 25, 2013	12.1%	
146.	"Hanggang kailan mananaig ang kasamaan ni Veronica?" (How long will the evil of Veronica shall last?)	January 28, 2013	12.0%	
147.	"Can Andrea and Raphael Prove That Veronica Is Behind Miggie's Abduction?"	January 29, 2013	11.6%	
148.	"Veronica Is Desperate, Which Can Push Her to Do the Worst"	January 30, 2013	—N/a	—N/a
149.	"Veronica Sets Another Trap That Will Put Raphael Into Bigger Trouble"	January 31, 2013	11.3%	

=== February 2013 ===
Episodes	Title	Original air date	Kantar Media Rating (Nationwide)	Source
150.	"The healing of wounds, who eventually say goodbye?"	February 1, 2013	12.3%	
