= Richard Juan =

Filipino TV personality and actor

- Born: August 2, 1992 (age 34); Philippines
- Education: University of the Philippines
- Occupations: TV personality, Actor, Host, Film Producer, Entrepreneur, Investor, Public Speaker
- Years active: 2014–present
- Agent(s): GMA (since 2014); ABS-CBN (2015–2023); TV5 (since 2024); ALLTV2 (since 2024)

Chinese name
- Traditional Chinese: 范鴻志
- Simplified Chinese: 范鸿志
Transcriptions
Standard Mandarin
- Hanyu Pinyin: Fàn Hóngzhì
Yue: Cantonese
- Jyutping: Faan^{6} Hung^{4}zi^{3}
Southern Min
- Hokkien POJ: Hoān Hông-chì
- Musical career
- Also known as: Richard Hwan
- Origin: Hong Kong

Richard Juan (Chinese: 范鴻志; Jyutping: Faan^{6} Hung^{4}zi^{3}; Pe̍h-ōe-jī: Hoān Hông-chì; Pīnyīn: Fàn Hóngzhì; born August 2, 1992), also known as Richard Hwan, is a Filipino television host, actor and film producer. He first gained popularity through the Eat Bulaga! segment "You're My Foreignoy" and won the Dabarkad's Choice Award. He was also a housemate on the reality show Pinoy Big Brother: 737.

He is the founder and managing director of Two Infinity Entertainment and also the co-founder of 28 Squared Studios.

== Early life and education ==
Richard Juan was born on August 2, 1992, in the Philippines. At the age of one month, his family relocated to Hong Kong. Juan attended Singapore International School and Canadian International School, and then completed high school at Island School. Juan then returned to the Philippines to continue his studies and graduated with a degree in broadcast communication at the University of the Philippines Diliman.

Though a permanent Hong Kong resident, Juan still holds Filipino citizenship, and thus a Chinese Filipino. Juan is multilingual; in addition to his native Cantonese, he is fluent in Filipino, English, Mandarin, and Hokkien.

== Career ==
Juan first appeared on national television on the Eat Bulaga segment "You're My Foreignoy," where foreigners living in the Philippines showcased their understanding of Filipino culture.

In 2015, he joined ABS-CBN's reality show Pinoy Big Brother: 737 as a regular housemate. He remained in the competition until week 17 (day 119), eventually placing in the final six. Juan's also became a host of the ABS-CBN Sports + Action's University Athletic Association of the Philippines coverage show, UPFRONT at the UAAP in 2016 alongside Justin Quirino and Marco Gumabao.

Juan made his acting debut on TV5's television film Wattpad Presents: AFGITMOLFM. He also made a guest appearance in an episode of GMA Network's drama anthology series Tadhana. Juan hosted the backstage show for Miss Universe 2016 which was hosted in the Philippines. Juan was selected as one of three regional artists to feature in the show "Create My Seoul" produced by TVN Asia.

In 2019, Juan became a recurring cast member of the ABS-CBN afternoon soap opera, Love Thy Woman. Juan returned to Pinoy Big Brother as a host in 2020, hosting both Pinoy Big Brother: Connect and Pinoy Big Brother: Kumunity Season 10.

Juan was cast in the romantic comedy film Connected, alongside Pinoy Big Brother: Connect contestants Kobie Brown, Andi Abaya, Ralph Malibunas, Gail Banawis, Chico Alicaya, and Amanda Zamora.

=== Public speaking ===
Juan is also an active as a public speaker throughout his career. One of his most notable speeches include a TEDx Talk focused on personal identity and nationalism. Additionally, he gave the opening speech at the 2019 New York Times Writing Competition, discussing digital transformation and the impact of social media to the world.

=== Film production ===
In 2021, Juan established the digital entertainment company 28 Squared Studios. 28 Squared Studios partnered with CJ ENM, 360 Entertainment, and Bhouse Studio to facilitate the Philippine auditions for "Boys Planet 999", a talent search project aimed at creating "the next biggest boy band".

In December 2022, Juan co-produced the film "The Safe Zone", which claims to be the world's first short film written and directed by ChatGPT.

Juan is the executive producer for Warner Bros. Pictures's first Filipino romance film Under Parallel Skies, directed by Sigrid Andrea Bernardo and starring Janella Salvador and Thai actor Metawin Opas-iamkajorn.

== Philanthropy ==
In response to the Taal Volcano eruption in 2020, Juan sourced N95 masks from Hong Kong, to donate to evacuees in Batangas, Philippines. This initiative was part of Juan’s commitment to leveraging his international connections for local relief efforts. Later that year, when the COVID-19 pandemic started, Juan again sourced protective gear from Hong Kong and donated it to various hospitals in Metro Manila.

In August 2020, Juan was named the Goodwill Ambassador for SOS Children’s Village Philippines.

== Awards and nominations ==
Year	Award	Category	Result
2014	Eat Bulaga: You're My Foreignoy	Dabarkad's Choice	Won
2014	Chalk BYM Campus Hotties 2014	Male Winner	Won
2019	Village Pipol Choice Awards	Lifestyle Influencer of the Year	Won
2021	NYLON Magazine BBB Awards	Fearless Internet Clapback	Nominated
2024	NYLON Magazine BBB Awards	Inspiring Personality	Won

== Filmography ==
=== Film ===
Year	Title	Role	Notes	Ref
2024	Under Parallel Skies	Leo	Supporting Role & Executive Producer	
2022	The Safe Zone	Leo	Served as the Executive Producer of the first short film written and directed by AI	
2022	Connected	Sky	Main Role	

=== Television ===
Year	Title	Role
2025	BE COOL: The Express Adventure	Host
2025	Family Feud (Philippine game show)	Guest
2024	Eat Bulaga!	Guest
2024	Family Feud (Philippine game show)	Guest
2023	It's Showtime!	Guest
2022	PIEnalo: Palong Follow	Himself/Guest
2021-2022	Pinoy Big Brother: Kumunity Season 10	Himself/Host
2020-2021	Pinoy Big Brother: Connect	Himself/Host
2020	Love Thy Woman	Richie
2019	Create My Seoul!	Himself/Guest
2018	Seoul Fashion Week S/S 2019 Special	Himself/Host
2018	Tadhana: Karayom	Chris
2017	Road Trip	Himself/Guest
2017	AFGITMOLFM	Art
2016	A1 Ko Sa 'Yo	Joaqs
2016	Be My Lady	Kevin
2016	UPFRONT at the UAAP	Himself/Host
2016	Kaya Mo Bang	Himself/Guest
2015	Pinoy Big Brother: 737	Himself/6th Place
2015	Aquino & Abunda Tonight	Himself/Guest
2015	Kapuso Mo Jessica Soho	Himself/Guest
2015	Day Off	Himself/Guest
2015	Taste Buddies	Himself/Guest
2014	Eat Bulaga!	Himself/Segment Host
2014	The Ryzza Mae Show	Himself/Guest
2014	Day Off	Himself/Guest
2014	IJuander	Himself/Guest
2014	Brigada	Himself/Guest
2014	Kapuso Mo Jessica Soho	Himself/Guest
2014	Pop Talk	Himself/Guest
2014	Unang Hirit	Himself/Guest
2014	Mars	Himself/Guest
2014	Celebrity Bluff	Himself/Guest
2014	Tunay Na Buhay	Himself/Guest
2014	Don't Lose the Money	Himself/Guest

=== Music video appearances ===
Year	Title	Artist
2021	Saya	Lian Kyla
