= Sino ang Maysala?: Mea Culpa =

2019 Philippine television drama series

- Title card
- Also known as: Mea Culpa
- Genre: Crime drama; Suspense
- Created by: Keiko Aquino
- Developed by: ABS-CBN Studios
- Directed by: Dan Villegas; Andoy L. Ranay; Darnel Joy R. Villaflor; Jerry Lopez Sineneng
- Starring: Jodi Sta. Maria; Bela Padilla; Ketchup Eusebio; Tony Labrusca; Kit Thompson; Sandino Martin; Ivana Alawi
- Country of origin: Philippines
- Original language: Filipino
- No. of episodes: 75 (list of episodes)

Production
- Executive producers: Carlo Katigbak; Cory Vidanes; Laurenti Dyogi; Roldeo T. Endrinal; Jemila Jimenez
- Producer: Arnel T. Nacario
- Editors: Aries Pascual; Jake Maderazo; Ceazarah Terrado-Vidallo; Marieta Manlutac; Joshua Ducasen; Dennis Austria; Godwin Lucena; Jessica Rae Viñas
- Running time: 26–35 minutes
- Production company: Dreamscape Entertainment Television

Original release
- Network: ABS-CBN
- Release: April 29 – August 9, 2019

Related
- Nasaan Ka, Elisa? (2011)

Sino ang Maysala?: Mea Culpa (International title: Mea Culpa / transl. Who is the Offender: My Fault) is a 2019 Philippine television drama crime series broadcast by ABS-CBN. Directed by Dan Villegas, Andoy L. Ranay, Darnel Joy R. Villaflor and Jerry Lopez Sineneng, it stars Jodi Sta. Maria, Bela Padilla, Ketchup Eusebio, Tony Labrusca, Kit Thompson, Sandino Martin, and Ivana Alawi. It aired on the network's Primetime Bida line up and worldwide on TFC from April 29 to August 9, 2019, replacing Halik and was replaced by The Killer Bride.

The series is streaming online on YouTube.

== Premise ==
One unfateful night, Juris (Bela Padilla), along with her fellow law graduates: Drei (Tony Labrusca), Greco (Kit Thompson), Gaylord (Sandino Martin), Lolita (Ivana Alawi) and their friend Bogs (Ketchup Eusebio), accidentally run over a woman named Barbara (Rubi Rubi) who had kidnapped a baby from a local hospital. They agree to bury Barbara's body afterwards in the hills overlooking Baguio. Discovering the baby in the grass, Juris takes care of the child as her own, wracked with guilt and believing that they had killed the child's mother. The real mother, Fina (Jodi Sta. Maria), emerges years later and is desperate to win her child back. The story follows the subsequent actions of the lawyers, who are torn between doing the right thing or disregarding the law they had sworn to uphold.

== Cast and characters ==
=== Main ===
- Jodi Sta. Maria as Filipina "Fina" S. Baniaga
- Bela Padilla as Julie Iris "Juris" Miranda / Julie Iris Agoncillo-Montelibano
- Ketchup Eusebio as Ambrosio "Bogs" Bitangcol / Armand Bitangcol
- Tony Labrusca as Andrei Joseph "Drei" Montelibano
- Kit Thompson as Gregorio "Greco" Catapang, Jr.
- Sandino Martin as Gaylord Mamaril
- Ivana Alawi as Lolita del Rio

=== Supporting ===
- Janice de Belen as Amor Capuyan
- Agot Isidro as Dolores Miranda
- Ayen Munji-Laurel as Matilda Montelibano
- Boboy Garovillo as Emilio "Emil" Agoncillo
- Jay Manalo as Luciano "Lucio" del Rio
- Maria Isabel Lopez as Maria Isabel "Maribel" Baniaga
- Allan Paule as Gregorio "Gorio" Catapang, Sr.
- Carla Martinez as Celia de Vera
- Leo Rialp as Estelito "Titong" de Vera
- Alvin Anson as Yandro Torres
- Menggie Cobarrubias as Lordivino Mamaril
- Via Veloso as Alice Catapang
- Chiqui del Carmen as Abigail Mamaril
- Iyannah Sumalpong as Joy S. Baniaga/Leyna Montelibano
- Ziljan Ventenilla as Noah S. Baniaga

=== Guests ===
- Bernard Palanca as Rommel Baniaga
- Joko Diaz as Ernesto Miranda
- CX Navarro as Rafa Catapang
- Noel Rayos as Dante Gallego
- Precious Espinosa as Christy Villanueva
- Karla Pambid as Atty. Greta Pilapil
- MM Gigante as Sibuyas
- William Lorenzo as Pedring Soliman
- Benedict Campos as Juancho Dela Cruz
- Rubi Rubi as Barbara Villanueva
- Jonic Magno as Edward, Philippine Cable Network news editor
- Giovanni Baldisseri as Sir Joel, NBI agent

== Production ==
=== Development ===
In September 2018, the drama series was originally titled as Mea Culpa. On the ABS-CBN trade launch in November 2018, the drama series was titled as Mea Culpa: Sino ang Maysala?. On March 18, 2019, the title was reversed into Sino ang Maysala?: Mea Culpa.

=== Casting ===
JC Santos was hired to star in this project but later on withdrew.

== Broadcast ==
Sino ang Maysala?: Mea Culpa premiered on April 29, 2019.

=== Reruns ===
It aired reruns on ALLTV since August 5 to October 22, 2023, replacing the reruns of Ngayon at Kailanman and was replaced the reruns of Sana Dalawa ang Puso.

== Mea Culpa: The Hidden Files ==
A director's cut version of the series, Mea Culpa: The Hidden Files was released on iWantTFC.

== Ratings ==
Kantar Media National TV Ratings (9:15PM PST)
Pilot Episode	Finale Episode	Peak	Average
22.2% April 29, 2019	25.1% August 9, 2019	25.1% August 9, 2019	17.4%

== Accolades ==
Year	Award giving body	Category	Recipient	Results
2019	33rd PMPC Star Awards for TV	Best Primetime Drama Series	Sino ang Maysala?: Mea Culpa	Nominated

== See also ==
- List of ABS-CBN Studios original drama series
