= Under Parallel Skies =

2024 Philippine-Hong Kong film by Sigrid Andrea Bernardo

- Theatrical release poster
- Directed by: Sigrid Andrea Bernardo
- Screenplay by: Sigrid Andrea Bernardo
- Produced by: Richard Juan; Kristhoff Cagape
- Starring: Metawin Opas-iamkajorn; Janella Salvador
- Cinematography: Boy Yniguez
- Edited by: Marya Ignacio
- Music by: Len Calvo
- Production companies: 28 Squared Studios; Two Infinity Entertainment
- Distributed by: Warner Bros. Pictures
- Release dates: 11 March 2024 (Hong Kong); 17 April 2024 (Philippines); 1 May 2024 (Singapore); 9 May 2024 (Thailand)
- Running time: 110 minutes
- Countries: Philippines; Hong Kong
- Languages: English; Filipino; Thai

Under Parallel Skies is a 2024 romantic drama film written and directed by Filipino director Sigrid Andrea Bernardo. Starring Filipino actress Janella Salvador and Thai actor Metawin Opas-iamkajorn, this culturally diverse production is set in Hong Kong.

It is a Philippine-Hong Kong venture produced by 28 Squared Studios and Two Infinity Entertainment and distributed by Warner Bros. Pictures.

== Synopsis ==
Under Parallel Skies tells the story of a Thai bachelor named Parin who travels to Hong Kong in search of his missing mother. He encounters a Filipino hotel employee named Iris who helps him navigate love, heartbreak, and healing in the foreign city amid their differences in culture and identity.

== Cast ==
- Metawin Opas-iamkajorn as Parin
- Janella Salvador as Iris & Thea
- Marj Lorico as Hotel supervisor
- Richard Juan as Leo
- Juliana Wong Pui Chun as Cynthia
- Lee King Lok as Ho Yin
- Duangjai Hiransri as Pimchan
- Siyamon Milner as Thai store owner
- Lee Jack Mariano as Doctor
- Kunal Hariram Narwani as Indian vendor
- Yu Chun Wai as Hotel housekeeper

== Production ==
The leading actors met for the first time in Bangkok in May 2023 and the film was shot in Hong Kong from June to July 2023, covering the old districts including Kowloon City, Peng Chau and Tai O.

Richard Juan, executive producer of 28 Squared Studios described the film as an “exploration of human connections in a world where cultures collide and mingle every day.”

Director Bernardo said, "My aim was to create a film that celebrates the uniqueness and traditions of each culture while exploring the common themes that unite us as human beings." Co-executive producer Kristhoff Cagape added: “Through this film, we aim to present an authentic portrayal of the realities of our world today, where cultural boundaries blur and intersect more than ever."

This film is the first production by newly-formed 28 Squared Studio, which co-produced with Two Infinity Entertainment of Hong Kong, with the support of Hong Kong Tourism Board that recommended shooting sites to the production team and given suggestions on how to incorporate Hong Kong cultural characteristics into the story.

== Release ==
28 Squared Studios has announced that the company has inked a distribution deal with Warner Bros. for Under Parallel Skies, making it the first movie from the Philippines to be distributed by the global film and entertainment studio in 2024. The film formally introduced at an event on 5 March in Manila. The occasion reveal the official poster and also disclose the release date.

Under Parallel Skies had its world premiere as part of the 17th Asian Film Awards in Hong Kong, scheduled for 11 March 2024. Following this, the film had nationwide theatrically released in the Philippines on 17 April, Singapore on 1 May, and Thailand on 9 May 2024. Under Parallel Skies also made its theatrical release in Laos, Indonesia, Hong Kong, United Arab Emirates, Cambodia and Vietnam, as well as its availability on Netflix on October 24, 2024.

== Critical reception ==
'Skies' received a score of 65/100 on review aggregator website Kritikultura based on 14 reviews, indicating a generally positive reception. On IMDb, the film holds a rating of 9/10, as of 26 April 2024.

Fred Hawson gave the film a score of 8 out of 10, saying, "the inter-cultural perspective that Bernardo took in her story-telling, together with the winsome chemistry of her two lead stars Metawin and Salvador, gave this film a distinctive dimension of its own." Meanwhile, Cinegeeks letter-graded the movie A−, remarking, "Although its conclusion may feel a little bit abrupt to some, Under Parallel Skies still soars thanks to the winning chemistry of stars Win Metawin and Janella Salvador set against the backdrop of picturesque Hong Kong."

Wanggo Gallaga of ClickTheCity, however, gave it 1 star. "All the elements are presents for a hit – a strong writer/director with a great track record for producing groundbreaking work, two big stars from different countries and cultures, a popular genre, an exotic location – but none of these things come into alignment and the film is way too close for comfort (cinematographically) that it leaves no room to breathe or to gain scope while the story is so thin that it resorts to familiar cliches to fill in the gaps," said Gallaga.
