= AFGITMOLFM =

2017 Filipino television film

- Genre: Teen, romantic comedy
- Based on: AFGITMOLFM by Rayne Mariano
- Written by: Rayne Mariano
- Screenplay by: Joel Ferrer; Eina Morales; Vero Zamesa; Redi Mendoza
- Directed by: Joel Ferrer
- Creative director: Joel Ferrer
- Starring: Myrtle Sarrosa; Richard Juan; Kino Adrian Rementilla
- Music by: "Better If We Hold Hands" by Rizza Cabrera
- Country of origin: Philippines
- Original languages: Filipino; English

Production
- Executive producers: Anne Biagan; Vero Zamesa; Eina Morales
- Producers: Andrea Roseus; Kram Cervantes
- Production location: Pasig
- Cinematography: Ian Marasigan
- Editor: Allison Barretto
- Running time: 90 minutes
- Production company: D5 Studios

Original release
- Network: TV5
- Release: July 8, 2017

AFGITMOLFM is a 2017 Philippine teen television film that aired on TV5 as part of its Wattpad Presents series. It is based on the pop fiction book of the same name written by Rayne mariano and originally published in 2009 on CandyMag.com's Teen Talk section and later popularized on the website Wattpad.

The film was directed by Joel Ferrer, and stars Myrtle Sarrosa, Richard Juan, and Kino Adrian Rementilla.

== Cast ==
- Myrtle Sarrosa as Janine Anne "Ianne" Santos, a hopeless romantic student
- Richard Juan as Art Felix "Emotionless Guy" Go
- Kino Adrian Rementilla as Dan Nathaniel Moises "Nate" Manio

== See also ==
- List of TV5 (Philippine TV network) original programming
- List of Filipino films and TV series based on Wattpad stories
