= Anita's Last Cha-Cha =

2013 romantic comedy-drama film by Sigrid Andrea Bernardo

- Ang Huling Cha-Cha ni Anita
- Directed by: Sigrid Andrea Bernardo
- Written by: Sigrid Andrea Bernardo
- Produced by: Ferdinand Lapuz; Tonee Acejo
- Starring: Angel Aquino; Therese Malvar
- Cinematography: Alma R. Dela Peña
- Edited by: Lawrence S. Ang; Kamille Leccio
- Music by: Diwa de Leon
- Production companies: Quiapost Productions; Ekweytor MC; Pixeleyes Multimedia; Unitel Pictures
- Distributed by: Studio5
- Release date: 18 September 2013 (CineFilipino)
- Running time: 112 minutes
- Country: Philippines
- Language: Filipino

Anita's Last Cha-Cha (Filipino: Ang Huling Cha-Cha ni Anita) is a 2013 Philippine independent coming-of-age romantic comedy-drama film written and directed by Sigrid Andrea Bernardo in her feature film directorial debut. Set in the province of Bulacan, the story follows a 12-year-old tomboyish girl who falls in love with an older woman who returned to the village after working overseas. It stars Angel Aquino and Therese Malvar in her introductory role, and features Marcus Madrigal, Solomon Mark De Guzman, and Lenlen Frial in supporting roles.

Produced by Quiapost Productions, Ekweytor MC, and Pixeleyes Multimedia, in association with Unitel Pictures, the film was released on 18 September 2013, as one of the entries for the 1st CineFilipino Film Festival. It was commercially released in the Philippines on 16 June 2017 after four years of screenings at local and international film festivals.

== Plot ==
Anita is a 12-year-old girl who lives in the village where they adored the saints of Obando with her widowed mother, who sells mussel chips, and older cousin, as well as her friends, Goying and Carmen. One day, much to the village folks' resentment, a mysterious older woman named Pilar returns from her work in the United Arab Emirates following her father's death. The reason for the resentment is that Pilar had an illegal abortion.

Years after Pilar's disappearance, Anita grew up and followed her late father's footsteps as an officer in the Philippine Army.

== Cast ==
- Angel Aquino as Pilar: The woman who returned from her job in the United Arab Emirates.
- Therese Malvar as Anita: The titular 12-year-old girl who has a crush on Pilar.
  - Jay Bordon as adult-aged Anita
- Marcus Madrigal as Oscar: Anita's older cousin
- Solomon Mark De Guzman as Goying: Anita's friend and Carmen's crush
  - Ian Pagcaliwagan as adult-aged Goying
- Lenlen Frial as Carmen: Anita's friend and Goying's crush
  - Marjorie Lorico as adult-aged Carmen
- Lui Manansala as Aling Lolita: Anita's mother.
- Gigi Columna as Lerma
- Star Orjaliza as Divina
- Sarah Pagcaliwagan as Apyang
- Rhea Medina as Ling-Ling
- Leo Salazar as Edward
- Yano Escueta as Radio Announcer

== Production ==
The screenplay was written in 2006 by the film's writer and director, Sigrid Andrea Bernardo, and it took eight years for the producers to approve it. According to the filmmaker, the MTRCB initially gave the movie an "X" rating, likely due to its homosexual undertones or obvious references to pedophilia. However, it was reclassified to an R-16 rating, following a successful appeal to the censor board by her and the festival organizers.

== Reception ==
=== Critical response ===
Marra Lanot, writing for The Philippine Star, gave praise to the film's subtle and sincere depiction of a young girl's lesbian awakening. She also praised its gentle, nonviolent approach and pointed out how it differs from other Filipino films that focus on male homosexuality. She also highlighted the film's rural location, organic performances, and skillful use of dance, music, and cinematography to enhance its subdued plot.

Heinrich Domingo, writing for Cinetactic, gave a very positive review with a rating of 4.5/5. He praised the coming-of-age narrative and the exploration of adolescent sexuality. He praised the film's lighthearted yet meaningful treatment of serious themes, as well as its countryside setting and expressive performances. Its restrained storytelling and emotional sincerity were also praised, citing a departure from more standard or harshly portrayed depictions of marginalized identities in Philippine cinema.

=== Accolades ===
Award-giving organization	Date	Category	Recipient(s)	Result	Ref.
1st CineFilipino Film Festival	22 September 2013	Best Film	Anita's Last Cha-Cha	Won (Note: Tied with Ang Kwento Ni Mabuti.)	
1st CineFilipino Film Festival	22 September 2013	Best Actress	Therese Malvar	Won	
1st CineFilipino Film Festival	22 September 2013	Best Supporting Actress	Angel Aquino	Won	
1st CineFilipino Film Festival	22 September 2013	Best Ensemble	Anita's Last Cha-Cha	Won	
30th PMPC Star Awards for Movies	9 March 2014	Indie Movie of the Year	Anita's Last Cha-Cha	Nominated	
30th PMPC Star Awards for Movies	9 March 2014	Indie Movie Director of the Year	Sigrid Andrea Bernardo	Nominated	
30th PMPC Star Awards for Movies	9 March 2014	Indie Movie Original Screenplay of the Year	Anita's Last Cha-Cha; Written by Sigrid Andrea Bernardo	Nominated	
30th PMPC Star Awards for Movies	9 March 2014	Movie Supporting Actress of the Year	Angel Aquino	Won	
30th PMPC Star Awards for Movies	9 March 2014	New Movie Actress of the Year	Therese Malvar	Nominated	
30th PMPC Star Awards for Movies	9 March 2014	Movie Child Performer of the Year	Lenlen Frial	Nominated	
30th PMPC Star Awards for Movies	9 March 2014	Indie Movie Cinematographer of the Year	Alma R. Dela Peña	Nominated	
30th PMPC Star Awards for Movies	9 March 2014	Indie Movie Production Designer of the Year	Popo Diaz	Nominated	
30th PMPC Star Awards for Movies	9 March 2014	Indie Movie Editor of the Year	Lawrence S. Ang and Kamille Lecio	Nominated	
30th PMPC Star Awards for Movies	9 March 2014	Indie Movie Musical Scorer of the Year	Diwa de Leon	Nominated	
30th PMPC Star Awards for Movies	9 March 2014	Indie Movie Sound Engineer of the Year	Nioko Aquino	Nominated	
9th Osaka Asian Film Festival	16 March 2014	Best Film (Grand Prix)	Anita's Last Cha-Cha	Nominated	
9th Osaka Asian Film Festival	16 March 2014	Special Mention	Anita's Last Cha-Cha	Won	
37th Gawad Urian Awards	17 June 2014	Best Actress	Therese Malvar	Nominated	
37th Gawad Urian Awards	17 June 2014	Best Supporting Actress	Angel Aquino	Won	
11th Golden Screen Awards	4 October 2014	Best Performance by an Actress in a Supporting Role	Angel Aquino	Won	
11th Golden Screen Awards	4 October 2014	Best Breakthrough Performance by an Actress	Therese Malvar	Nominated	
