= Sigrid Andrea Bernardo =

Filipino film director

Sigrid Bernardo
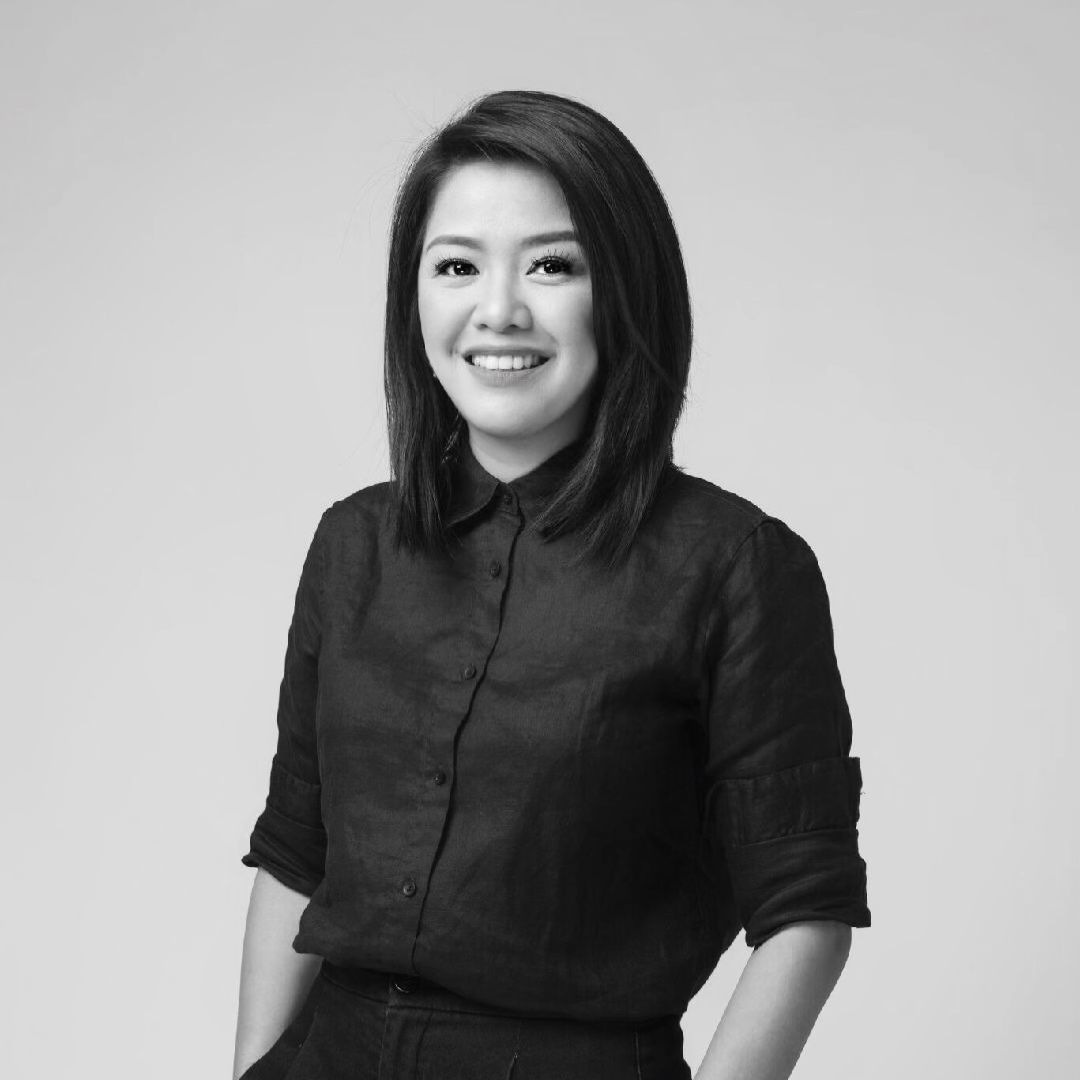
- Bernardo in 2017
- Born: August 19, 1984 (age 42)
- Occupations: Film director; screenwriter; producer; actress
- Known for: Director of Kita Kita

Sigrid Andrea Bernardo is a Filipino film director, screenwriter, producer, and actress best known for directing the highest-grossing Philippine independent film Kita Kita (2017). Bernardo is a graduate of Theater Arts at the University of the Philippines and pursued a scholarship at the Tanghalang Pilipino under the Cultural Center of the Philippines. Her thematic-conscious films focus on topics such as human rights, women, political, social issues and culture studies.

== Career ==
Bernardo's first feature-length film Ang Huling Cha-Cha ni Anita (2013) was selected at the Produire au Sud in Nantes, France, and also bagged Best Picture at the CineFilipino Film Festival.

Her 2017 film Kita Kita, starring Alessandra de Rossi and Empoy Marquez and set in Sapporo, Japan was deemed a sleeper hit. In its third week it reached ₱300 million, making it the highest-grossing Philippine independent film. It had its world premiere in Japan at the 12th Osaka Asian Film Festival in March 2017 before expanding to a wider release in the Philippines on July 19, 2017, to highly positive reviews. In 2017, Kita Kita was selected as the best romantic-comedy film in the last 25 years, as polled by CNN Philippines.

She got to work again with de Rossi and Marquez in the movie Walang Kaparis which was released on Amazon Prime Video in March 2023. It became the No. 1 movie in the Top 10 Movies in the Philippines on its release week.

Among her other films include Untrue (2019), Mr. and Mrs. Cruz (2018), and Lorna (2014).

Bernardo bagged the Movie Director of The Year award for Untrue at the 37th Star Awards for Movies. The film was also hailed as Movie of the Year at the awards ceremony.

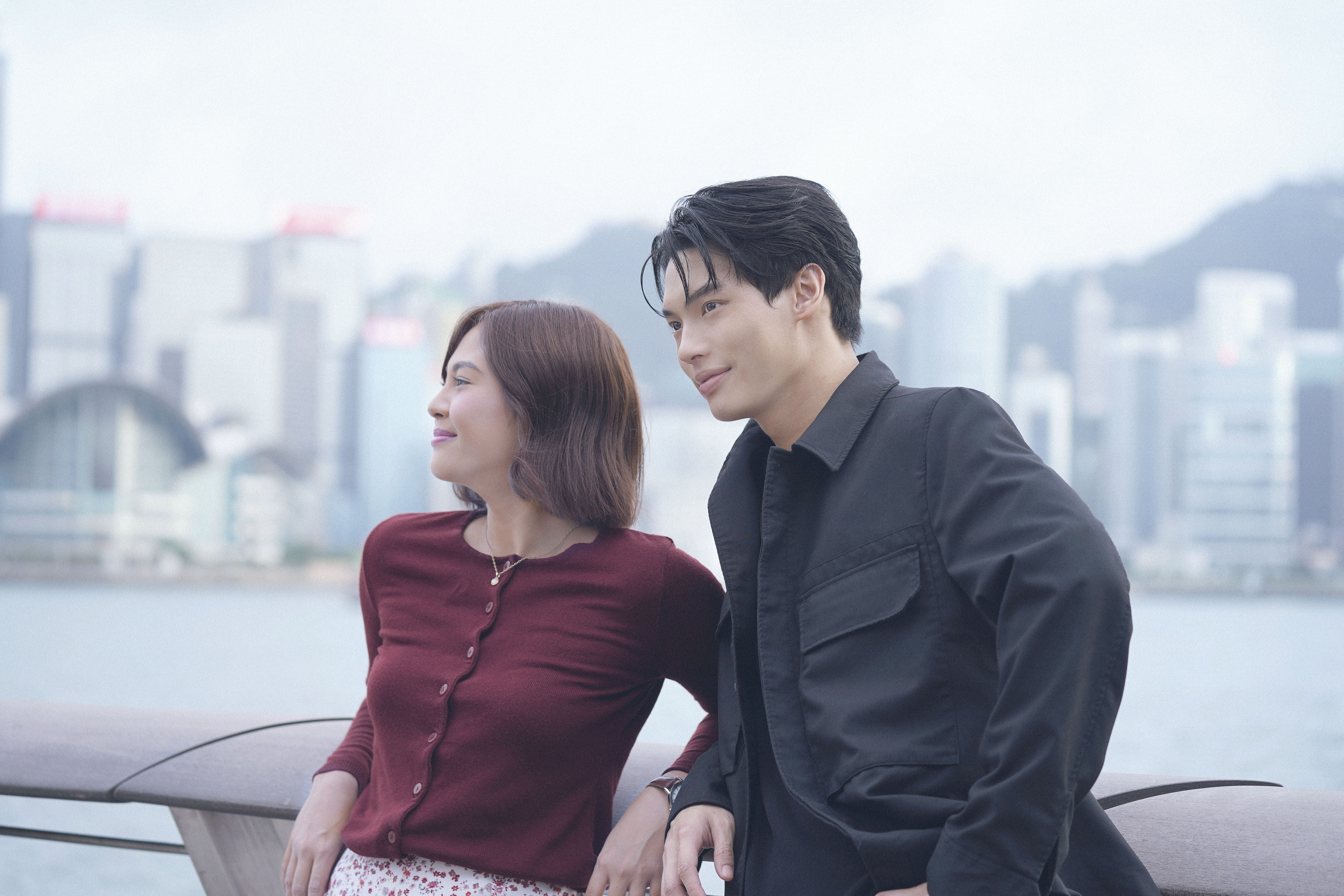
Win Metawin and Janella Salvador to star in Bernardo's Under Parallel Skies

In July 2023, it was announced that Bernardo would be directing the cross-country film Under Parallel Skies starring Metawin Opas-iamkajorn of Thailand and Janella Salvador of the Philippines. The movie was shot in Hong Kong and co-produced by 28 Squared Studios and Two Infinity Entertainment.

"With this cross-country collaboration, the actors can bring their own unique skill sets and experiences, which can help enrich the story and give more authenticity to the characters they play," she said about directing the cross-border movie.

"I aim to create a film that celebrates the unique identities and traditions of each culture while also exploring common themes and experiences that unite us as human beings," she added.

Bernardo also directed short films including Babae (2005), Little (2009), Au Revoir Philip (2010), and Ang Paghihintay sa Bulong (2012).

She won Best Director in Cinemalaya Independent Film Festival for her directorial work in Babae. The short film also won Best Short Film in Cinemagaylesbico International Film Festival in Milan, Italy.

Ang Paghihintay sa Bulong was selected for the Cinemalaya Film Festival and bagged the Best Screenplay award. It also won the honorable mention at the Exground Film Festival in Wiesbaden, Germany.

== Filmography ==
=== Film ===
Year	Film	Role	Cast(s)	Notes
2007	Rights	Director, writer	Lilia Corpuz, Ernesto Corpuz ("Lost and Found"); Hershey Abarico, Herson Abarico ("Bangka o Eroplano")	"Lost and Found" and "Bangka o Eroplano" segments
2013	Ang Huling Cha-Cha ni Anita	Director, writer	Angel Aquino, Therese Malvar, Jay Bordon	Selected at Produire au Sud in Nantes, France, won Best Picture and Best Ensemble at the CineFilipino Film Festival, and Special Mention award at the Osaka Asian Film Festival
2014	Lorna	Director, writer	Shamaine Buencamino, Maria Isabel Lopez, Raquel Villavicencio	Selected as a finalist for Cinema One Originals
2017	Kita Kita	Director, writer	Alessandra de Rossi, Empoy Marquez	Won Star Awards for Movies 2018 for Movie Director of the Year and Movie Screenwriter of the Year
2018	Mr. & Mrs. Cruz	Director, writer	Ryza Cenon, JC Santos	Its lead star Ryza Cenon received the Yakushi Pearl Award from the Osaka Asian Film Festival
2019	UnTrue	Director, writer	Christine Reyes, Xian Lim	Premiered at the Tokyo Film Festival; Won Movie Director of the Year at 37th Star Awards for Movies
2023	Walang Kaparis	Director, writer	Alessandra de Rossi, Empoy Marquez	Became No. 1 on Prime Video's Top 10 Movies in the Philippines on its release week
2024	Pushcart Tales	Director, writer	Nonie Buencamino, Shamaine Buencamino	Entry to the 1st Puregold CinePanalo Film Festival
2024	Under Parallel Skies	Director, Writer	Janella Salvador, Metawin Opas-iamkajorn	
2026	I Fell, It's Fine	Director	Rhian Ramos, Glaiza de Castro	(In Development)

=== TV Show ===
Year	TV Show	Role	Episode	Ref.
2008	Case Unclosed	Director	Magsaysay Plane Crash	

=== Web series ===
Year	Web series	Role	Ref.
2022	Lulu	Director, writer	

== Accolades ==
Awards and nominations received by Sigrid Andrea Bernardo
Awards and Nominations
Organization	Year	Nominated Work	Category	Result	Ref.
CineFilipino Film Festival	2013	Ang Huling Cha-Cha ni Anita	Best Picture	Won	
CineFilipino Film Festival	2016	Ang Huling Cha-Cha ni Anita	Special Citation	Won	
Cinemalaya Independent Film Festival	2005	Babae	Best Director - Short Film	Won	
Cinemalaya Independent Film Festival	2005	Babae	Best Short Film	Nominated	
Cinemalaya Independent Film Festival	2012	Ang Paghihintay sa Bulong	Best Screenplay - Short Film	Won	
Cinemalaya Independent Film Festival	2012	Ang Paghihintay sa Bulong	Best Short Film	Nominated	
Cinema One Originals Digital Film Festival	2014	Lorna	Best Picture	Nominated	
The EDDYS	2018	Kita Kita	Best Screenplay	Nominated	
The EDDYS	2021	UnTrue	Best Director	Nominated	
Gawad Urian Awards	2018	Kita Kita	Best Director Pinakamahusay na Direksyon	Nominated	
Gawad Urian Awards	2018	Kita Kita	Best Screenplay Pinakamahusay na Dulang Pampelikula	Nominated	
Luna Awards	2018	Kita Kita	Best Direction	Nominated	
Luna Awards	2018	Kita Kita	Best Screenplay	Nominated	
Milan International Lesbian and Gay Film Festival	2015	Ang Huling Cha-Cha ni Anita	Best Film (Special Mention)	Won	
Osaka Asian Film Festival	2014	Ang Huling Cha-Cha ni Anita	Special Mention	Won	
Osaka Asian Film Festival	2014	Ang Huling Cha-Cha ni Anita	Grand Prix	Nominated	
Osaka Asian Film Festival	2017	Kita Kita	Best Film Grand Prix	Nominated	
Osaka Asian Film Festival	2018	Mr. & Mrs. Cruz	Best Film Grand Prix	Nominated	
PMPC Star Award for Movies	2014	Ang Huling Cha-Cha ni Anita	Indie Movie Director of the Year	Nominated	
PMPC Star Award for Movies	2014	Ang Huling Cha-Cha ni Anita	Indie Movie Screenwriter of the Year	Nominated	
PMPC Star Award for Movies	2018	Kita Kita	Movie Director of the Year	Won	
PMPC Star Award for Movies	2018	Kita Kita	Movie Screenwriter of the Year	Won	
PMPC Star Award for Movies	2022	UnTrue	Movie Director of the Year	Won	
PMPC Star Award for Movies	2022	UnTrue	Movie Screenwriter of the Year	Nominated	
San Diego Short Film Festival	2025	Angelite	Best Picture	Won	
San Diego Short Film Festival	2025	Angelite	Best Foreign Language Film	Won	
