= Kit Thompson =

Filipino actor

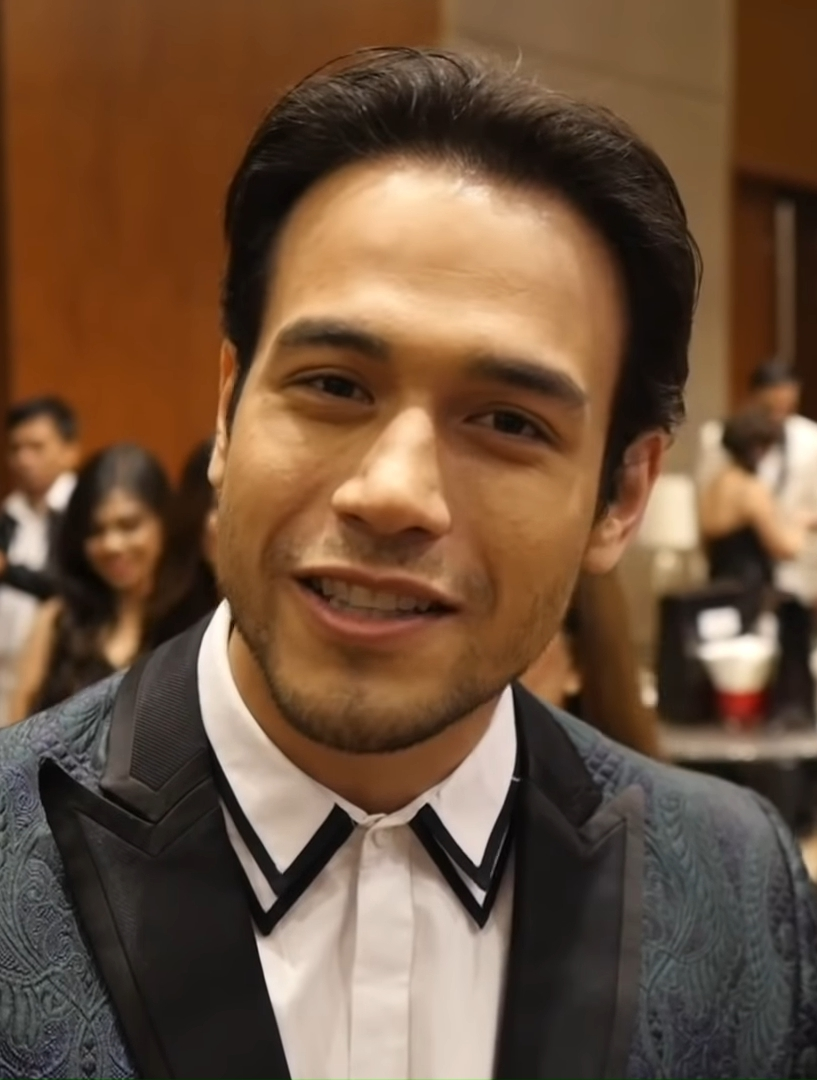
- Thompson in 2020
- Born: Keith San Esteban Thompson; New York City, USA
- Other name: Keith Thompson
- Education: New York Film Academy
- Occupations: Actor; model; television presenter
- Years active: 2010–2022; 2024–present
- Agents: GMA Artist Center (2010–2012); Star Magic (2012–2022) Cornerstone Entertainment

Keith San Esteban Thompson, known professionally as Kit Thompson, is a Filipino-New Zealand actor, model, and television host. He was a housemate in the reality show Pinoy Big Brother: Teen Edition 4 (2012).

== Career ==
Thompson was a housemate of Pinoy Big Brother: Teen Edition 4 which aired in 2012. In the same year, he was cast as Albert Espirutu in ABS-CBN's Kahit Puso'y Masugatan and appeared in an episode of the drama anthology Maalaala Mo Kaya.

For the Cinemalaya entry #Y, Thompson shared a Special Citation for Ensemble Acting award with actors Chynna Ortaleza, Coleen Garcia, Sophie Albert and Elmo Magalona.

In 2018, Thompson appeared as Darwin in Star Cinema's The Hows of Us. A year later, he appeared as Josh in Belle Douleur, as Marco in the iWant original MOMOL Nights, and as Greco in Sino ang Maysala?: Mea Culpa―for which he was awarded Best Supporting Actor in the 4th GEMS Awards.

In 2020, Thompson appeared as James in Pamilya Ko and in the first season of La Vida Lena.

In 2024, Kit Thompson appeared in “FPJ’s Batang Quiapo” as Alvin Daniega, former boyfriend of Bubbles (Ivana Alawi) and then, Kit appeared in “Family Feud Philippines”.

== Legal issues ==
On March 18, 2022, Thompson was arrested by the Philippine National Police (PNP) after receiving a report that his girlfriend, actress Ana Jalandoni, needed rescuing after allegedly being detained and beaten by Thompson in their hotel room in Tagaytay. The PNP charged Thompson with violating at least two provisions of the Republic Act 9262, or the Anti-Violence Against Women and Their Children law. He posted bail on March 21. The extent of Jalandoni's injuries was published on social media.

== Filmography ==
=== Television ===
Year	Title	Role	Notes	Source
2010	Reel Love Presents Tween Hearts	Keith Villanueva		
2012	Maalaala Mo Kaya	Joni	Episode: "Jacket"	
2012–2013	Kahit Puso'y Masugatan	Alberto "Ambet" Espiritu		
2014–2015	Forevermore	Julius San Juan		
2016	Dolce Amore	Amor		
2016	Born for You	Martin Gonzales		
2019	Sino ang Maysala?: Mea Culpa	Greco Catapang		
2019	Ipaglaban Mo!	Enzo Valdez	Episode: "Paasa"	
2019	Maalaala Mo Kaya	Billy	Episode: "Pulang Laso"	
2020	Pamilya Ko	James		
2020–2022	La Vida Lena	Miguel Villarica		
2022	Maalaala Mo Kaya	Jhon Bautista (last TV appearance before arrest warrant)	Episode: "Simbahan"	
2024	FPJ's Batang Quiapo	Alvin Daniega		
2025	My Secret Life	Jake	Microdrama	
2026	My Bespren Emman	Dywne		

=== Film ===
Year	Title	Role	Notes	Source
2013	Must Be... Love'	Nicco		
2014	#Y	Ping		
2018	The Hows of Us	Darwin		
2019	Belle Douleur	Josh		
2019	MOMOL Nights	Marco		
2021	Sarap Mong Patayin	Yael		
2025	Meet, Greet & Bye	Boyet Facundo	Special participation	
2026	The Loved One	Jim		

== Awards and nominations ==
Year	Work	Award	Category	Result	Source
2014	#Y	Cinemalaya Philippine Independent Film Festival	Special Citation for Ensemble Acting	Won	
