= Pinoy Big Brother: Teen Edition 4 =

Coordinates: 14°38′20″N 121°02′05″E

Pinoy Big Brother: Teen Edition
- Season 4
- Presented by: Toni Gonzaga; Bianca Gonzalez; Robi Domingo; John Prats
- No. of days: 91
- No. of housemates: 16
- Winner: Myrtle Sarrosa
- Runner-up: Karen Reyes

Release
- Original network: ABS-CBN
- Original release: April 8 – July 7, 2012

Season chronology
- ← Previous; Teen Clash 2010

The fourth season of the reality game show Pinoy Big Brother: Teen Edition aired on ABS-CBN for 91 days from April 8 to July 7, 2012. This season surpassed Teen Edition Plus' record of the longest edition of the series by 13 days.

This was the last separate season of this edition to air after all editions were merged into one season starting on Pinoy Big Brother: All In. This was also the first and only season in the series to date where the two-in-one housemates survived a split connection.

Myrtle Sarrosa of Barotac Nuevo, Iloilo emerged as the winner of the season. Karen Reyes was the runner-up, while Roy Requejo and Joj & Jai Agpangan were the finalists.

== Development ==
=== Auditions ===
Auditions were held in major key cities in the Philippines and other parts of the world. A total of 22,305 teens auditioned for the season.

== Overview ==
=== House theme ===
The House for this season remains largely unchanged since Unlimited, except for total redecoration spanning a week since the previous edition's finale. This marked the franchise's fastest House makeover. Visibly so far, there are only five areas of the House: the House itself, the garden, the activity area, a secret hallway leading into Big Brother's Time Machine, and Big Brother's Conference Room. The House is decorated with various items from on the 1970s and 1980s, such as old vinyl records on the walls which Big Brother said that it was inspired by his own teenage life.

=== Hosts ===
Toni Gonzaga, Bianca Gonzalez and Robi Domingo reprised their roles as hosts. They were joined by Pinoy Big Brother: Celebrity Edition 1 ex-housemate and runner-up John Prats.

== Format ==
=== Twists ===
- Two-in-One Housemates: Two housemates who are related biologically or by other means, are joined as one competing housemate, assigned by Big Brother. The status of one would be the status of the other. On Day 71, a split of connections was cast, in which both of the twins survived. Their shared status remained for the rest of the season.
- House Players: They enter the house to test the remaining official housemates through tasks set by Big Brother and the public.
- Power of One: The public may only vote once per day per mobile phone number.
- Big Jump to the Big Night: Housemates compete to have a slot in the finals.
- SE Voting System: The public is given the chance to vote to save or evict a housemate. The housemate with the lowest net votes of Save and Evict votes combined, is evicted. The system was used in the season finale.

== Housemates ==
Nine housemates, an all-male line-up plus female twins, entered the house on Day 1. Twins Jai and Joj were the first two to enter via the garden, hours before opening night to perform a special task for Big Brother. The second batch of six housemates, consisting of an all-female line-up, entered on Day 2 during the late-afternoon Über show. The ages indicated were the housemates' ages upon their entrance to the House.

Name	Age on entry	Hometown	Entered	Exited	Result
Myrtle Sarrosa	17	Iloilo	Day 2	Day 91	Winner
Karen Reyes	15	Oriental Mindoro	Day 2	Day 91	Runner-up
Roy Requejo	17	Camarines Sur	Day 1	Day 91	3rd Place
Jai & Joj Agpangan	16	Negros Occidental	Day 1	Day 91	4th Place
Ryan Boyce	15	Pampanga	Day 1	Day 86	Evicted
Alec Dungo	17	Laguna	Day 1	Day 83	Evicted
Yves Flores	17	Tarlac	Day 1	Day 76	Evicted
Tom Doromal	15	Davao City	Day 1	Day 70	Evicted
Mariz Rañeses	16	Cebu City	Day 2	Day 56	Evicted
Kit Thompson	15	Angeles City	Day 1	Day 49	Evicted
Clodet Loreto	13	Davao City	Day 2	Day 42	Evicted
Claire Bercero	15	Makati	Day 2	Day 35	Evicted
Angelica Nikka Javier	15	Batangas	Day 2	Day 28	Evicted
Vincent Manlapaz	15	Rizal	Day 1	Day 21	Evicted

=== Houseguests ===
Similar to the franchise's previous seasons, Big Brother invited guests to his house for special purposes.

Notable houseguest for this season were Luis Manzano, Vice Ganda, Angeline Quinto, Yeng Constantino, Sam Milby, John Prats, Robi Domingo and past winners, Kim Chiu, Melai Cantiveros, Slater Young.

== Weekly tasks ==
Task No.	Date given	Description	Result
1	April 11, 2012 (Day 04)	The Girls' Names; The male housemates will be forced to wear blacked-out goggles all week long. They should correctly match at least five names to the corresponding female housemates.	Passed^{T1}
2	April 16, 2012 (Day 10)	Big Deal Task; The housemates were divided into teams Blue Whale and Sunny Side-Up. They will have PHP10,000 as seed money for operating a new business. Their businesses have to earn at least PHP15,000 by the end of the week.: Team name / Leader / Members / Earnings; Blue Whale / Myrtle / Claire; Clodet; Karen; Roy; Tom; Vince / ₱16,830; Sunny Side-Up / Alec / Joj & Jai; Kit; Mariz; Nikka; Ryan; Yves / ₱18,630	Passed^{T2}
3	April 23, 2012 (Day 16)	Ipa Mukha Mo; The housemates are given two life-sized puppets with customizable facial features. They would have to make a play about respect showing four emotions: happiness, sadness, anger and fear. The housemates can only commit three mistakes (in facial expressions, synchronization, etc.) in order to win the task. Losing the task means no weekly budget. Assigned Leaders Kit; Karen	Failed^{T3}
4	April 30, 2012 (Day 23)	PatiBahayan; Under the guidance of Pinoy Big Brother: Unlimited winner Slater Young (a civil engineer by trade), the housemates will be divided into three teams that will build a small house using the materials provided. Each house will undergo durability testing by the end of the month. The group with the least sturdy house will have one member be automatically nominated for the next eviction. The name of the task is a portmanteau of the Tagalog words patibayan (test of strength) and bahay (house). The most hard-working housemate from each group would be the leader. Below are the teams of the weekly task.: Leader / Members / Ranking; Roy / Alec; Joj & Jai; Karen; Nikka; Yves / 1st; Ryan / Claire; Clodet; Tom^{T4} / 2nd; Kit / Mariz; Myrtle / 3rd	Passed
5	May 6, 2012 (Day 29)	Pinoy Big Bulilit; The housemates will be paired up with a child to take care of for the entire week. They will also organize an educational play where their wards will also participate.	Passed
6	May 14, 2012 (Day 36)	Build A Big Dream Concert; The housemates will organize their own concert and perform in it as well. All funds raised will benefit a local elementary school.	Passed^{T5}
7	May 29, 2012 (Day 51)	Time is Gold; The housemates will have 30 hours to complete their everyday household chores. This includes preparing the food, eating, taking a bath and other challenges given by Big Utol.	Passed
8	June 5, 2012 (Day 58)	BB Republic; The male and female housemates will be separated into two groups, who will propose and implement a decree on the other group, with consequences set for violators. Both groups will also be prohibited from talking to each other.	Passed^{T6}
9	June 11, 2012 (Day 64)	Raise the Flag; The housemates, in pairs, must raise a flag in the garden and keep it flying at all costs.	Passed
10	June 18, 2012 (Day 71)	Just Got Luck-Key; The housemates will open a chest filled with 100 locks only when the song Just Got Lucky by the JoBoxers is played.	Failed^{T7}

^T1: The boys correctly matched all eight names.
^T2: Team Blue Whale earned PHP16,830 & Team Sunny Side-Up got PHP18,630.
^T3: The housemates committed eight mistakes.
^T4: Tom was originally in Kit's team, but when Big Brother asked if the housemates wanted to change teams Tom decided to go to Ryan's team.
^T5: This task spanned two weeks. Tom and Karen won Outstanding Performance and Best Performance respectively
^T6: Although the housemates were organized by gender, house player Kim was assigned to the boys' group while the girls got Francis.
^T7: The housemates only opened 98 out of 100 locks.

== Nomination history ==
The housemate first mentioned in each nomination gets two points, while the second gets one point. The percentage of votes shown is the percentage of votes to save unless otherwise stated. Certain factors leading to each housemate's nomination, such as violating show rules against discussing nominations, are noted below.

On Day 70, it was announced right after the eviction night that evictions would now be done every Friday from the usual Saturday starting Day 76 until the last eviction night before the finale. Nomination nights are also moved to Monday from the usual Sunday starting Day 72. Changes of the program schedule were made to free up airtime for The X Factor Philippines.

Pinoy Big Brother: Teen Edition 4 nomination history
	#1	#2	#3	#4	#5	#6	#7	Face-to-Face Nomination	#9	#10	Big Night	Nominations received
	#1	#2	#3	#4	#5	#6	#7	#8	#9	#10	Big Night	Nominations received
Eviction day and date	Day 21 April 28	Day 28 May 5	Day 35 May 12	Day 42 May 19	Day 49 May 26	Day 56 June 2	Day 70 June 16	Day 76 June 22	Day 83 June 29	Day 86 July 2	Day 91 July 7	Nominations received
Nomination day and date	Day 15; April 22	Day 22; April 29	Day 29; May 6	Day 36; May 13	Day 43; May 20	Day 50; May 27	Day 64; June 10	Day 72; June 18	Day 79; June 25		Day 86; July 2	Nominations received
Myrtle	Claire; Mariz	Karen; Claire	Karen; Claire	Karen; Clodet	Karen; Ryan	Tom; Ryan	Tom; Yves	Karen; Roy	No nominations	Finalist	Winner	19 (+2)
Karen	Mariz; Vincent	Myrtle; Clodet	Mariz; Yves	Myrtle; Clodet	Yves; Kit	Mariz; Tom	Yves; Tom	Yves; Alec	No nominations	Finalist	Runner-up	28
Roy	Vincent; Mariz	Nikka; Claire	Clodet; Mariz	Clodet; Mariz	Yves; Mariz	Mariz; Yves	Yves; Ryan	Myrtle; Yves	No nominations	Finalist	3rd Place	7
Jai & Joj	Claire; Kit	Myrtle; Claire	Claire; Mariz	Kit; Clodet	Kit; Myrtle	Ryan; Yves	Yves; Ryan	Yves; Ryan	No nominations	No nominations	4th Place	0
Ryan	Vincent; Mariz	Nikka; Myrtle	Claire; Mariz	Clodet; Mariz	Mariz; Myrtle	Mariz; Tom	Yves; Tom	Myrtle; Alec	No nominations	No nominations	Evicted (Day 86)	11
Alec	Kit; Yves	Kit; Yves	Claire; Karen	Kit; Mariz	Kit; Yves	Mariz; Tom	Tom; Yves	Yves; Karen	No nominations	Evicted (Day 83)		2 (+1)
Yves	Claire; Nikka	Nikka; Kit	Mariz; Claire	Kit; Karen	Kit; Roy	Mariz; Roy	Tom; Roy	Ryan; Roy	Evicted (Day 76)			40
Tom	Vincent; Kit	Mariz; Yves	Yves; Mariz	Mariz; Clodet	Yves; Mariz	Mariz; Yves	Yves; Roy	Evicted (Day 70)				18
Mariz	Karen; Clodet	Karen; Claire	Karen; Claire	Clodet; Karen	Kit; Karen	Ryan; Tom	Evicted (Day 56)					42
Kit	Nikka; Claire	Nikka; Mariz	Claire; Karen	Clodet; Mariz	Mariz; Yves	Evicted (Day 49)						27 (+1)
Clodet	Mariz; Kit	Myrtle; Karen	Karen; Tom	Tom; Roy	Evicted (Day 42)							17
Claire	Karen; Yves	Myrtle; Karen	Yves; Tom	Evicted (Day 35)								22
Nikka	Kit; Karen	Myrtle; Karen	Evicted (Day 28)									11
Vincent	Kit; Clodet	Evicted (Day 21)										7
Notes	^{1}	none	^{2}	none	^{3}	^{4}	^{5}	none	^{6}		^{7}	
Up for eviction	Claire; Kit; Mariz; Vincent	Karen; Myrtle; Nikka	Claire; Karen; Kit; Mariz; Yves	Clodet; Karen; Kit; Mariz	Alec; Kit; Yves	Mariz; Myrtle; Tom	Myrtle; Tom; Yves	Karen; Myrtle; Ryan; Yves	Open Voting			
Saved from eviction	Kit; 49.76% Claire; 17.52% Mariz; 17.42%	Myrtle; 52.19% Karen; 32.73%	Karen; 42.44% Yves; 21.33% Kit; 13.17% Mariz; 12.53%	Karen; 55.59% Kit; 20.89% Mariz; 12.72%	Alec; 40.81% Yves; 40.09%	Myrtle; 71.88% Tom; 19.66%	Myrtle; 52.25% Yves; 30.49%	Myrtle; 37.83% Ryan; 22.20% Karen; 21.94%	Myrtle; 39.58% Karen; 26.76% Roy; 12.10% Jai & Joj; 9.85%		Myrtle; 33.92%	
Evicted	Vincent; 15.30%	Nikka; 15.08%	Claire; 10.53%	Clodet; 10.80%	Kit; 19.10%	Mariz; 8.46%	Tom; 17.26%	Yves; 18.03%	Alec; 5.35%	Ryan; 6.36%	Karen; 11.91% Roy; 9.38% Jai & Joj; 9.26%	

Legend
Bold Italicized name Indicates that the housemate won the "Big Jump to the Big Night" and was saved from the last evictions; however was still included to be voted by the public for the Big 4.
Automatic nomination (due to violation(s) committed, failure of task, reserved housemate evictions)
Granted immunity (due to a successful completion of a "Secret Task", a challenge winner.)

^Note 1: Before the nomination, Kit and Yves talked about giving points to certain housemates. As a punishment, the two competed in cleaning bed sheets dirtied by the girl housemates but they can only use their elbows and knees to brush the sheets. The loser will automatically get three nomination votes. In the end Kit won, resulting in Yves receiving three points.
^Note 2: Kit automatically nominated himself as punishment for his team building the weakest house in the Patibahayan weekly task.
^Note 3: Alec, Roy, & Ryan talked about nominating the girl housemates one-by-one. Big Brother put the trio up for a basketball challenge and whoever fails will complete the list of this week's nominees. In the end Alec lost, resulting in his automatic nomination.
^Note 4: Myrtle reaped the automatic nomination for talking about not nominating Kit. On the other hand, Tom and Karen won Outstanding Performance and Best Performance respectively. As a reward one of which would either get a Luxury gift for loved ones and immunity. They mutually agreed that Karen will be granted Immunity.
^Note 5: Big Brother asked the two groups (boys and girls) to pick a housemate from the other group whom they want to automatically nominate. The girls chose no one while the boys chose Myrtle, thus being nominated for the week. Meanwhile, Karen won another Immunity challenge.
^Note 6: Big Brother implemented the "Power of One" rule wherein the public may only vote once per day per Sim card. The percentage of votes of the top three housemates were not revealed on-air. The top three votes were simply attributed to Housemates A, B, and C.
^Note 7: Big Brother implemented the "S-E Voting" system wherein the public may vote to save or evict (in this case, prevent from winning) a housemate. Like the previous regular season, votes are reset after the final eviction.

== Big Jump to the Big Night ==
Carried over from Double Up, this season's Big Jump to the Big 4 twist consists of two parts.

=== Ex-housemates Voting ===
On Day 77, Big Brother asked the ex-housemates which three of the remaining housemates deserve to win the Big Jump. Even though the ex-housemates ranked their bets, each name mentioned only corresponds to one vote, regardless of ranking. PBB Double-Up Big Winner Melisa Cantiveros, who coincidentally received the Big Jump in her season, visited the House to announce which three housemates will move on to the endurance challenge.

Ex-housemate	1st	2nd	3rd
Yves	Myrtle	Jai & Joj	Roy
Tom	Roy	Jai & Joj	Karen
Mariz	Roy	Myrtle	Jai & Joj
Kit	Karen	Roy	Ryan
Clodet	Roy	Alec	Ryan
Claire	Roy	Jai & Joj	Alec
Nikka	Roy	Alec	Jai & Joj
Vincent	Jai & Joj	Alec	Roy

Housemate	Nominations Received
Alec	4
Jai & Joj	6
Karen	2
Myrtle	2
Roy	8
Ryan	2

=== Endurance Task ===
Alec, Jai & Joj and Roy were assigned to stay atop a slope and hold on to a cart weighed proportionate to their own body weight. Alec was the first housemate to give up at five hours, while Joj lasted for roughly seven hours. Roy held on to the cart for eight hours and six minutes, ensuring his Big Four qualification.

== Finale: B.F.F. at The Big Night ==
On July 7, 2012, 91 days after the season started, the B.F.F. (Big Fantastic Finale) at The Big Night took place at the Malolos Sports and Convention Center in Bulacan. Prior to the Big Night, on the tenth Eviction Night, three special mechanics for the Big Night voting were announced. All votes were reset back to zero while the SE Voting System, which was last used in Unlimited's fourth eviction night, will be activated in lieu of the Power of One rule.

Myrtle Sarrosa of Barotac Nuevo, Iloilo was proclaimed the winner who garnered 33.92% of total net votes. Karen Reyes placed second garnering 11.91% of total net votes, while Roy Requejo placed third with 9.38% of total net votes. Jai & Joj Agpangan placed fourth after garnering 9.26% of total net votes.

=== S–E voting system result ===
Below is the eviction voting result implemented on the big night.

Eviction no.	Big 4	Votes			Result
Eviction no.	Big 4	To-Save	To-Evict	Net	Result
Big Night	Jai & Joj	10.43%	-1.17%	9.26%	4th Place
Big Night	Karen	15.93%	-4.02%	11.91%	Runner-up
Big Night	Myrtle	45.01%	-11.09%	33.92%	Winner
Big Night	Roy	10.87%	-1.49%	9.38%	3rd Place

Preceded by Unlimited	Pinoy Big Brother: Teen Edition 4 (April 8, 2012–July 7, 2012)	Succeeded by All In
