= Philippine noontime variety television shows =

In the Philippines, variety television shows have become mainstays of the noontime slot for network programming since 1958. The first Philippines noontime variety television shows were influenced by the popularity of bodabil (vaudeville) in the first half of the 20th century. Since then, the format has evolved with the changing times, with elements of reality television also incorporated as well since the 2000s. The majority of the noontime variety shows that aired on television were produced independently by blocktimers that pay a certain amount of time to television networks to air their program. Some TV networks, though, have managed to solely produce these kind of programs, with moderate success in terms of ratings and advertising revenues.

== Highlights ==
The longest-running noontime variety and entertainment show is Eat Bulaga!, which will celebrate its 48th anniversary on July 30, 2027. The two other long-running noontime variety shows are Student Canteen, on for 19 years, followed by It's Showtime, which will celebrate its 18th anniversary on October 24, 2027.

GMA, ABS-CBN (through its successors Kapamilya Channel, A2Z, and All TV), and TV5 each air up to two noontime shows a week. A weeklong noontime show usually runs from Monday to Saturday, and a separate noontime show is reserved for Sundays. Since May 17, 2026, All Out Sundays became the lone Sunday noontime show airing at the traditional Sunday noontime slot, while Vibe, a Saturday primetime musical variety show on TV5 airs a replay of its episodes on the same time slot together with All TV, A2Z and Kapamilya Channel.

- GMA: TiktoClock and All-Out Sundays
- ABS-CBN (Kapamilya Channel/A2Z/All TV): It's Showtime (simulcast on GMA)
- TV5: Eat Bulaga! (simulcast on RPTV/RPN)

== History ==
=== Student Canteen (1958–1965) ===
Student Canteen was the first noontime variety show on Philippine television. It was originally a radio show on DZXL that was brought to television on CBN-9 on July 21, 1958, at the sign-on of its television station, DZXL-TV. It was hosted by Eddie Ilarde, Pepe Pimentel, and Leila Benitez. Alternating as pinch-hitting hosts were Bobby Ledesma and Bobby de Veyra. It ended on January 8, 1965, when Ilarde went to politics and was succeeded by several noontime shows before returning in 1975.

=== Student Canteen's successors (1965–1975) ===
Magandang Tanghali, a musical variety show hosted by Pancho Magalona, and Stop Look and Listen, a former noontime variety show hosted by Eddie Mesa, took over Student Canteen's timeslot on January 9, 1965. When Mesa left for the United States, Twelve O'Clock High, a show hosted by Ariel Ureta and Tina Revilla-Valencia, premiered and aired until 1972 when martial law was declared and many television stations were shut down by the Marcos regime. From October 1972 to 1974, the show aired on RBS (now GMA) as Ariel con Tina, a blocktimer by Philippine Production Center, Inc., a company headed by Romy Jalosjos. Lunch Break also became popular on the same channel before Student Canteen was eventually revived.

=== Student Canteen's revival and the birth of Eat Bulaga! (1975–present) ===
Student Canteen was revived in January 1975 by Ilarde, who produced the program under his production company Program Philippines, Inc., after accepting an offer from GMA executives. He was joined by Ledesma and Pepe Pimentel with new co-hosts Helen Vela and Coney Reyes.

Student Canteen became the most-watched noontime program in the 1970s and Program Philippines branched out to produce other TV shows on GMA-7. The comic trio of Tito Sotto, Vic Sotto, and Joey de Leon (collectively known as TVJ and who were introduced on Student Canteen's sister show Discorama) became guest hosts when some of the main hosts went on leave. Student Canteen was the only noontime variety show on Philippine television from 1975 to 1979. Production Specialists, Inc., (led by Romeo Jalosjos and Tony Tuviera) offered TVJ to host a new noontime show for RPN in 1979. After some misunderstandings with the Student Canteen's main hosts, they decided to accept the offer and Eat Bulaga! aired its first episode on July 30, 1979. The trio were accompanied by Richie D' Horsie and Chiqui Hollmann.

From May 31 until June 4, 2023, the show suspended production after its original hosts – Tito Sotto, Vic Sotto and Joey de Leon – announced that they would part ways with TAPE Inc. Fellow hosts of the show – Paolo Ballesteros, Jose Manalo, Maine Mendoza, Ryzza Mae Dizon, Wally Bayola, Ryan Agoncillo and Allan K. – and production members gave their resignations on the same day. Host Carren Eistrup resigned on June 8. On June 5, the show resumed original programming, with Paolo Contis, Buboy Villar, Betong Sumaya, Cassy Legaspi, Mavy Legaspi, and Alexa Miro joining as the new hosts of the show. In the same month, Glaiza de Castro, Kimpoy Feliciano, Dasuri Choi, Arra San Agustin, and Isko Moreno also joined the show.

Eat Bulaga! ended its airing on GMA on January 5, 2024, after the Marikina Regional Trial Court issued a joint decision preventing TAPE, Inc., and GMA from using the show's trademark and other elements associated with it. TVJ Productions assumed the trademark shortly after the court decided in their favor, and a current iteration of Eat Bulaga! started airing on TV5 effective January 6, 2024, replacing its interim show, E.A.T. It also make a mark of the return to its original home, RPN, as well, thus making both Student Canteen and Eat Bulaga! become the only noontime show that having aired on ABS-CBN and RPN which were had using the same Channel 9 frequency.

==== Competition ====
A two-way competitions between noontime shows started in 1979 when Eat Bulaga! (first aired on RPN 9) fought against Student Canteen (aired on GMA 7). Since then, Eat Bulaga! has faced several rivalries with other noontime shows through the years.

===== Student Canteen (1979–1986) =====
Eat Bulaga! (EB) struggled with its ratings and a lack of advertisers in its first year of airing due to Student Canteen's stronghold on television. EB was in danger of cancellation until "Mr. Macho" was launched in 1980, which allowed EB to surpass Student Canteen's ratings. EB started airing nationwide in 1982 with the launch of RPN's domestic satellite, which also coincided with Coney Reyes's transfer to EB and Chiqui Hollman to Student Canteen. Other people were introduced in Student Canteen; but the show was eventually canceled by the GMA management in March 1986, after the People Power Revolution (also known as the EDSA Revolution) that toppled the Marcos regime one month earlier, in February 1986. Student Canteen was revived on February 18, 1989, on RPN-9 but was canceled on June 10, 1990, after a misunderstanding occurred between the show's producers and the RPN management.

===== Lunch Date (1986–1993) =====
Lunch Date became Student Canteen's successor on June 9, 1986, and was GMA's first station-produced noontime variety show. Its original hosts were Orly Mercado, Rico J. Puno, Toni Rose Gayda, and Hollmann. When the show was reformatted after a year, it only retained Gayda and Hollman and brought in a mix of new and established artists to host the show, including Randy Santiago, Keno, Lito Pimentel, Tina Revilla, Pilita Corrales, Louie Heredia, Sheryl Cruz, Jon Santos, Dennis Padilla, Fe Delos Reyes, Manilyn Reynes, Willie Revillame, and Ai Ai de las Alas. The show introduced new segments that challenged EB's reign in the noontime slot.

In 1987, EB's ratings improved when Aiza Seguerra, a Little Miss Philippines winner, joined the show and became popular with viewers. In 1989, changes were made to both noontime shows: former RPN-9 executive Wilma Galvante and former EB writer Vincent Dy Buncio joined Lunch Date as the executive producer and director of the show, respectively. Meanwhile, EB moved to ABS-CBN due to RPN's sequestration under the Cory Aquino administration. EB (together with its sister shows produced by TAPE, Inc.) helped ABS-CBN increase its TV network ranking to No. 1, from No. 4. It also started the rivalry of GMA and ABS-CBN in the noontime slot, a rivalry existed until May 5, 2020, when the broadcasting franchise of ABS-CBN lapsed and with the eventual departure of TVJ from TAPE, Inc. on May 31, 2023. In 1993, GMA's management decided to reformat their own noontime show and replaced it with SST: Salo-Salo Together. According to de Leon, Lunch Date was their toughest opponent ever because it was pitted against EB for more than 7 years, the longest, compared to other noontime shows, until It's Showtime surpassed it in 2019.

===== SST: Salo-Salo Together (1993–1995) =====
SST first aired on March 20, 1993, as a replacement for Lunch Date. The show was hosted by Randy Santiago, Dennis Padilla, and Smokey Manaloto with Liezl Martinez, Anjanette Abayari, Joy Ortega, and Giselle Sanchez as co-hosts. In less than six months after it aired, SST started to overtake EB in ratings by providing fresh interactive segments. Ai-Ai delas Alas (who previously co-hosted Lunch Date) and Bayani Agbayani (who was part of SST's production staff) were also hired as co-hosts.

It started as a blind item as 1994 was about to end, until news leaked out that SST was going to go off the air to give way to EB at the 12 pm slot. This transpired after EB itself had decided to move to GMA following their producer TAPE Inc.'s refusal to sell the show's rights to ABS-CBN. During SST's New Year episode on December 31, 1994, the announcement of the new variety show's move to GMA was officially made by hosts Randy Santiago and Dennis Padilla. The management decided to keep SST after they decided to move it to an earlier time slot, as a lead-in to EB. The last noontime episode of SST was aired on January 27, 1995. On January 30, 1995, SST was reformatted as a morning talk show, with a 10:30 am timeslot. On June 30, 1995, SST was permanently cancelled.

===== 'Sang Linggo nAPO Sila (1995–1998) =====
After Eat Bulaga! moved to GMA, ABS-CBN decided to make Sa Linggo nAPO Sila into a daily noontime show as 'Sang Linggo nAPO Sila (SLNS). Its pilot episode was aired on February 4, 1995, hosted by the APO Hiking Society. During its first year, 'Sang Linggo led the ratings in the provinces and cities where ABS-CBN had a stronger signal. The real challenge was content deviating from the usual noontime variety show that Eat Bulaga! had presented to the viewers for almost two decades. Meanwhile, Bulaga had presented new faces such as Allan K., Jose Manalo, and Donna Cruz, and new segments such as Super SiReyna and the Philippine Bulaga Association. Calendar Girl was introduced by SLNS in 1996 with various male hosts joining APO Hiking's Jim Paredes or Buboy Garovillo in interviewing the contestants clad in two-piece swimsuits. The segment was reformatted in 1998 with John Estrada, Randy Santiago, and Willie Revillame named as permanent segment hosts. The new trio made naughtier jokes. SLNS also introduced an interactive game portion, "Barangay APO", where segment host Eagle Riggs toured different barangays (districts) around Metro Manila to give out cash prizes.

The rating for SLNS improved but the main hosts did not agree with the changes on their show. Eventually, ABS-CBN ended their noontime show on November 30, 1998, due to criticisms that some of the show's hosts lacked real connection with the masses. Magandang Tanghali Bayan took its place with its main hosts, Santiago, Estrada, and Revillame.

===== MTB (1998–2005) =====
====== Magandang Tanghali Bayan (1998–2003) ======
After the APO Hiking Society failed to beat EB's high ratings, Randy, John, and Willie were pitted against the established trio of Tito, Vic, and Joey as ABS-CBN launched its new noontime show on November 30, 1998, with the title Magandang Tanghali Bayan. Its highlight segment, "Pera O Bayong", allowed Magandang Tanghali Bayan to overtake EB's ratings for years. EB had made its first millions on television through its segments "Meron O Wala" and the all-time popular segment "Laban O Bawi", which featured the phenomenal all-female dance group Sexbomb Girls. Magandang Tanghali Bayan faced numerous controversies and suspensions including the one-week suspension of the show in August 1999 due to the notorious green jokes of the hosts. During that week, a placeholder show entitled Esep-Esep filled the timeslot. In 2001, Revillame was dismissed from the show, which resulted in major changes, such as new hosts and segments.

Another triumvirate of hosts was introduced on when matinee idols Rico Yan, Dominic Ochoa, and Marvin Agustin joined the show after Willie's exit. Their addition resulted in the show pulling in a younger demographic which resulted to more students and young professionals appreciate noontime viewing. However, on March 29, 2002, Yan died during his Lenten vacation in Palawan, and Magandang Tanghali Bayan was reformatted on November 23, 2002, with new segments and additional hosts, after it lost in terms of ratings to EB. The reformat, however, failed to stop the management from deciding to bring back Revillame effective February 22, 2003, which led to the show's second incarnation, Masayang Tanghali Bayan.

====== Masayang Tanghali Bayan (2003–2004) ======
Magandang Tanghali Bayan aired its last episode on February 21, 2003, and was replaced by Masayang Tanghali Bayan as ABS-CBN's response to the noontime competition with EB. The new MTB premiered on February 22, 2003, and was simulcast on ABS-CBN's VHF (led by flagship station Channel 2) and UHF channels (Studio 23) nationwide, with Revillame reunited with Santiago and Estrada, along with co-hosts Padilla, delas Alas, Bayani Agbayani, Mickey Ferriols, Aubrey Miles, Tado, and Bentong. The show gave out more cash prizes than its predecessor through the segments "Super Jack En Poy" and "Urong Sulong", which gave away 2 million pesos as a jackpot prize.

Before the end of 2003, Revillame resigned from the show in consequence of his derogatory joke against their co-host Mahal. The show continued to air until February 2004 with comedian Vhong Navarro and actor-host Edu Manzano taking over Willie's place. However, Masayang Tanghali Bayan failed to sustain viewership and was canceled on February 20, 2004, two days before its first anniversary on television.

====== MTB: Ang Saya Saya (2004–2005) ======
The third incarnation of MTB, entitled MTB: Ang Saya Saya premiered on February 21, 2004, with delas Alas, Manzano, and Arnell Ignacio as its main hosts. The show introduced a new set of co-hosts and segments, with a focus on reality talent-based searches for the latter. However, these efforts were overshadowed by the "Silver Special" of Eat Bulaga!, which received the highest rating of a noontime show, exceeding 30%. On November 15, 2004, MTB: Ang Saya Saya lost its 12:00 pm slot to Kris Aquino's Pilipinas, Game KNB? and started airing as an afternoon variety show in the 12:45 pm time slot, as the network's strategic move against the anniversary special, which failed. After months of low ratings, the management decided to cancel MTB: Ang Saya Saya on February 4, 2005, and launched a new noontime show hosted by Revillame.

===== Wowowee, It's Showtime, Pilipinas Win Na Win, Happy Yipee Yehey!, and Wowowillie (2005–present) =====
Former MTB host Revillame returned to the noontime slot with the new show Wowowee on February 5, 2005. Wowowee had three iterations, the first 2005 to 2006 and second 2006 to 2010 with Revillame, and a short-lived third and final without him in 2010, and ABS-CBN's influence worldwide (via TFC) helped both lead the noontime race. The show faced controversies during its one-year of the 2005 first and original, four-year of the 2006–2010 second, and two-months run of the 2010 third and final on television. The ULTRA Stampede, which happened during the first anniversary of the show, led to the death of 71 people and ended the show's first iteration on February 4, 2006, being replaced by Alay sa Kapamilya which aired until March 2006. The Guinness World Records cited the incident as "the greatest death toll in a game show".

After the stampede, the second iteration of Wowowee started on March 11, 2006. During this iteration, the Hello Papi scandal, wherein Revillame allegedly cheated a contestant during the jackpot round on one of its game segments, happened. The scandal led to an on-air argument between Revillame and de Leon. In 2010, Revillame threatened the ABS-CBN management to remove radio/TV host Jobert Sucaldito, or he would resign from the noontime show, due to Sucaldito's criticisms of Revillame and Wowowee. On May 5, Revillame left permanently, ending this iteration.

The short-lived third iteration, without Revillame, from May 5 to July 30, 2010, had guest-hosts in two-week shifts with the first being Robin Padilla. Among the other guest hosts were Cesar Montano, and the Pilipinas Got Talent's inaugural tandem emcees Luis Manzano and Billy Crawford, before settling with Manzano alone for the last weeks of July until its cancellation. After negotiations between the show's departed host and the network, the network decided that this iteration would end on July 30, 2010, resulting in its final end (coinciding with Eat Bulaga!'s 31st anniversary on ABS-CBN's rival GMA). It was replaced by Pilipinas Win Na Win on July 31, 2010. Revillame then transferred to TV5 on September 18, 2010, five and three months after he left from hosting Wowowee and its cancellation, respectively, where he subsequently had stints with TV5 from October 23, 2010, the same month where Showtime began airing in the noontime slot, to October 12, 2013, as a primetime game show host in Willing Willie, Wil Time Bigtime, and briefly returning to noontime with Wowowillie. In 2015, he returned to Philippine television, hosting Wowowin, a primetime variety game show with the same format as the previous game shows on networks he previously served, which were Wowowee (ABS-CBN), Willing Willie, Wil Time Bigtime, and Wowowillie (TV5), that aired on GMA and All TV from May 10, 2015, to April 5, 2023.

It's Showtime started as Showtime which was a morning talent show that started airing on October 24, 2009, as a lead-in program to Wowowee, overtook the ratings of both Wowowee and EB.

Competition became harder for EB; so, they decided to take a different approach. To celebrate their 30th anniversary in 2009, they honored people from different fields, gave scholarships to honor students, and built classrooms for public schools in different provinces. EB also renovated their studio to accommodate a larger studio audience, install LED screens, and to commemorate the first anniversary of the death of Francis Magalona on March 6, 2010. EB also launched its widely popular segment Juan for All, All for Juan: Bayanihan of D' Pipol (a regular segment which broadcasts remotely from different barangays).

Pilipinas Win Na Win was ABS-CBN's shortest-lived noontime show, with Kris Aquino and Robin Padilla as its hosts, while some co-hosts from Wowowee joined. Some of the show's staff left the show to join Revillame's comeback on TV5 In 2010. After receiving consistently low ratings since its launch, ABS-CBN asked Aquino mid-September to leave the show; she quietly left in September 2010. Two days later on October 2, ABS-CBN officially announced four new hosts and two new co-hosts. The four hosts tagged as the "hitmakers" included Rico J. Puno, Rey Valera, Marco Sison, and Nonoy Zuñiga. It was replaced by Showtime on its timeslot, moving Pilipinas Win Na Win to a later noontime timeslot from October 2010 until it was cancelled, ending on December 31, 2010, during the New Year celebration, due to constant low ratings, with the former lasting in the 12 pm slot until February 11, 2011. The cancellation was announced by Puno several times during the December 20 episode. Rumors were posted on entertainment websites, from interviews of a fellow co-host, Valerie Concepcion, before the network announced its cancellation.

After the cancellation of Pilipinas Win Na Win, ABS-CBN Studio 3 was later used as the set of The Price Is Right hosted by Kris Aquino from January to September 16, 2011, making it the first non-afternoon show to use the studio after Wowowee's cancellation. The unsuccessful stint of Pilipinas Win Na Win took over its whole timeslot by Showtime from January 1 to February 2011, until Happy Yipee Yehey! premiered on February 12, 2011, returning the latter to its original morning timeslot. Before its premiere, Willie Revillame (then-host of Willing Willie on TV5) challenged its upcoming host John Estrada that Happy Yipee Yehey! would not equal his show's success in terms of ratings and that Revillame would promote Eat Bulaga! constantly on his show. Happy Yipee Yehey! was hosted by former MTB hosts John Estrada and Randy Santiago, along with Toni Gonzaga, Rico J. Puno, and Pokwang. The new noontime show introduced segments similar to its predecessors, such as "Pera O Bayong", "My Girl", and "Miss Kasamabahay". Initially at Studio 4, due to Studio 3 being occupied by The Price is Right, the show moved to the latter studio from September 17, 2011, to January 25, 2012, returning Studio 3 as the set for ABS-CBN's afternoon shows. Again, nine and eight months after Pilipinas Win Na Win ended, the former's studio took by the latter on December 31, 2010, and January 2011, respectively.

Revillame's prediction was correct. Two of the ABS-CBN noontime shows that aired after the third 2010 iteration of Wowowee, which were Pilipinas Win na Win and Happy Yipee Yehey!, both received consistently low ratings due to Eat Bulaga!'s strong noontime viewership resulting from the cancellation of his previous show. This resulted in Showtime going on hiatus on January 28, 2012. The show would be re-formatted to become a noontime show again which would replace Happy Yipee Yehey!. The drama series Mundo Man ay Magunaw took over Showtime's timeslot while the latter was in hiatus from January 30 to February 3, 2012. Happy Yipee Yehey! aired its final episode on February 4, 2012, when it took over Showtime's timeslot on Saturday. Due to Showtime being the top morning variety show, ABS-CBN management decided to make it again a noontime show as It's Showtime on February 6, 2012, after which it has been continuously occupying the timeslot, which made ABS-CBN's noontime slot again dominant, which had not been seen since the finale of the aforementioned iteration of Wowowee 1 year and 7 months earlier, on July 30, 2010, as both shows failed to reach Wowowee's popularity and following the former's 2010–2011 airing on the said slot. The show's return to a noontime slot introduced segments from the Showtime series and new segments such as "Sine Mo 'To", "AdVice Ganda", "That's My Tomboy", "I Am PoGay", and "Magpasikat". The show is currently hosted by Vice Ganda, Anne Curtis, Vhong Navarro, Jhong Hilario, Karylle, Ryan Bang, Kim Chiu, Ogie Alcasid, Amy Perez, Jugs Jugueta, and Teddy Corpuz.

Following the ABS-CBN franchise renewal controversy, which led to the shutdown of ABS-CBN's free-on-air stations and the denial of the congressional franchise, It's Showtime resumed its broadcast on June 13, 2020, on the Kapamilya Channel with simulcast on A2Z upon its launch in October 2020.

The show began its simulcast on TV5 on July 16, 2022, through a back-to-back deal with Tropang LOL, which was reformatted as a late morning variety show formerly called Lunch Out Loud. On May 1, 2023, It's Showtime returned to its original 12:00 PM timeslot, following the conclusion of Tropang LOL.

On June 30, 2023, It's Showtime ended its simulcast on TV5 and moved to GMA's sister network, GTV, the next day with a new timeslot of 11:30 AM every Saturday.

Beginning on April 6, 2024, It's Showtime made its mark as the third Kapamilya noontime show to air on GMA, following in the footsteps of its predecessors Student Canteen (1975–1986) and Eat Bulaga! (1995–2024), which saw both noontime shows achieve greater success in ratings during their time as a Kapuso noontime show. On June 17, 2024, the show expanded its reach when it was simulcasted on All TV, marking a return to its original home, Channel 2 analog free television and Channel 16 digital free TV, both former frequencies of the show's producer, trademark, and copyright registration holder, ABS-CBN. Both this move and with the Eat Bulaga!'s coverage expansion into CNN Philippines (later rebranded as RPTV), also marking the historic return of the traditional Mondays to Saturdays noontime slot on both Channel 2 and Channel 9 to their original ABS-CBN roots.

===== Lunch Out Loud/Tropang LOL (2020–2023) =====
Lunch Out Loud is one of the numerous programs produced by Brightlight Productions, a production company of Albee Benitez, that serves as the blocktimer of TV5 and was directed by newcomer Bjoy Balagtas. Serving as creative director to the show was veteran television director and former Star Magic head and now GMA Artist Center consultant Johnny Manahan. Former It's Showtime director Bobet Vidanes later joined the show in November 2020 also as a creative consultant until he took over from Manahan as creative director in 2021.

On July 16, 2022, Lunch Out Loud was reformatted as Tropang LOL and started airing as a late-morning variety show. The show also began its simulcast on the pay TV Kapamilya Channel, Kapamilya Online Live, and A2Z as preprogramming to its former rival It's Showtime, which also started its simulcast on TV5 that same day. The show concluded on April 29, 2023, with It's Showtime returning to the 12:00 noon timeslot.

===== TiktoClock (2022–present) =====
TiktoClock premiered on the GMA Network on July 25, 2022, as pre-programming for Eat Bulaga!. Directed by Louie Ignacio, it was originally hosted by Kim Atienza, Pokwang, and Rabiya Mateo. Conceptualized as a one-of-a-kind countdown variety show where "every minute counts", it had an original running time of 45 minutes, from 11:15 am to 12:00 noon but later expanded to an hour (11:15 am until 12:15 pm) when GMA started airing contemporary Filipino movies under Lunchtime Movie Hits following the cancellation of Tahanang Pinakamasaya. On April 8, 2024, the show was moved to an earlier timeslot (11:00 am to 12:00 noon) and had a simulcast until September 13, 2024, on GTV back-to-back with It's Showtime. Atienza remains an original host to the host and is now joined by Jayson Gainza, Faith da Silva, and Herlene Budol as hosts.

===== E.A.T. (2023–2024) =====
E.A.T. officially premiered on July 1, 2023, amidst a dispute over the ownership rights of the Eat Bulaga! trademark, between TVJ and TAPE, as it marks the highly anticipated return for the renowned trio Tito Sotto, Vic Sotto, and Joey de Leon, alongside Allan K., Jose Manalo, Wally Bayola, Paolo Ballesteros, Ryan Agoncillo, Maine Mendoza, Ryzza Mae Dizon, Tugue Zombie, Miles Ocampo, Atasha Muhlach, and Carren Eistrup. It airs on TV5 from Monday to Friday from 12:00 pm to 2:30 pm and Saturdays from 11:30 am to 2:30 pm, with simultaneous live streaming on social media platforms. It also has a delayed telecast on the BuKo Channel on Monday from 4:00 pm to 7:00 pm and Tuesday to Saturday from 4:00 pm to 6:30 pm.

===== It's Your Lucky Day (2023) =====
It's Your Lucky Day is a noontime game–variety show produced as a temporary replacement for It's Showtime, following a 12-day suspension imposed by the Movie and Television Review and Classification Board (MTRCB) due to an alleged obscene act of improper etiquette involving Vice Ganda and Ion Perez in a July 25 episode "Isip Bata" segment.

The show premiered on October 14, 2023, temporarily replacing It's Showtime for the duration of its suspension, airing until October 27, 2023.

===== Tahanang Pinakamasaya (2024) =====
Tahanang Pinakamasaya became the official title of TAPE Inc.'s noontime show after the Marikina Regional Trial Court issued a joint decision preventing them and their home station, GMA, from using the Eat Bulaga! trademark and other elements associated to it. The new noontime show retained the hosts and staff hired by TAPE Inc. from the new Eat Bulaga! that premiered on June 5, 2023, after former main hosts Tito Sotto, Vic Sotto, and Joey de Leon left on May 31, 2023, along with their co-hosts and key staff members.

The show premiered on January 6, 2024, and aired their last live episode on March 2, 2024. Consequently, TAPE Inc.'s social media accounts were taken down hours after the final episode. Replays of selected episodes were aired from March 4, 2024, to March 7, 2024. TAPE Inc. issued an official statement, at the end of the March 7, 2024, replay of the finale, to say that they have decided to end the show, marking an end of TAPE's 29-year airtime lease on GMA's noontime block. GMA, on the other hand, issued a separate official statement circulated through their social media accounts.

Following the cancellation of Tahanang Pinakamasaya, GMA started airing contemporary Filipino movies under the movie block Lunchtime Movie Hits which began on March 8, 2024, with the 2011 movie The Unkabogable Praybeyt Benjamin. The Saturday edition of the Kapuso Movie Festival began airing on March 9, 2024, as the network's lead-in to Lunchtime Movie Hits on Saturdays. Both movie blocks ceased airing on April 6, 2024, as It's Showtime became GMA's new flagship noontime show, following GMA's new contract agreement with ABS-CBN Studios, which was signed on March 20, 2024.

== Sunday noontime shows ==
Currently, ABS-CBN Studios' ASAP holds the record for being the longest-running Sunday noontime variety show, which celebrated its 31st anniversary on February 5, 2026. It began airing on the ABS-CBN television network in 1995 when Eat Bulaga! moved to GMA and the Sunday noontime show Sa Linggo nAPO Sila became a weeklong noontime show. During its 22nd anniversary year, ASAP surpassed GMA Supershow as the longest-running Sunday noontime variety show. ASAP currently airs on pay television network Kapamilya Channel, with simulcasts on A2Z, All TV and TV5, along with a delayed telecast on Jeepney TV and Metro Channel every Sunday night.

Its current rival is All-Out Sundays (AOS) airing on GMA. AOS aired its pilot episode on January 5, 2020, as a replacement for Sunday PinaSaya.

Its current rival is Vibe Playback airing on TV5, a rerun of the Saturday primetime episodes of Vibe, aired its pilot episode on March 8, 2026, as a replacement for ASAP, it later expanded its airing to All TV, A2Z and Kapamilya Channel on October 25, 2026, where it taking over the ABS-CBN's traditional Sundays noontime slot formerly occupied by ASAP for 31 years.

And after 31 years, the longest-running Sunday noontime variety show ASAP aired its final episode at its traditional noontime slot as it moves into primetime starting May 17, 2026 as ASAP XP.

Other popular defunct Sunday noontime variety shows include:

GMA	ABS-CBN/Kapamilya Channel
GMA Supershow (May 7, 1978 – January 26, 1997) SOP (February 2, 1997 – February 28, 2010) Party Pilipinas (March 28, 2010 – May 19, 2013) Sunday All Stars (June 16, 2013 – August 2, 2015) Sunday PinaSaya (August 9, 2015 – December 29, 2019) All-Out Sundays (January 5, 2020 – present)	Sa Linggo nAPO Sila (December 3, 1989 – January 29, 1995) ASAP (February 5, 1995 – May 10, 2026) (May 17, 2026 – present, as a primetime musical-variety show renamed as ASAP XP) Vibe+ Playback (October 25, 2026 – present; simulcast)
TV5	
P.O.5 (April 11, 2010 – February 20, 2011) Fan*tastik (February 27 – May 22, 2011) Sunday Funday (April 8 – June 10, 2012) Game 'N Go (June 17, 2012 – February 3, 2013) Happy Truck ng Bayan (June 14, 2015 – February 7, 2016) Happy Truck HAPPinas (March 6 – May 1, 2016) Sunday Noontime Live! (October 18, 2020 – January 17, 2021) ASAP (January 24, 2021 – December 28, 2025, October 18, 2026 – present; simulcast) Vibe+ Playback (March 8, 2026 – present)

Other popular defunct Weekday noontime variety shows include:

GMA	ABS-CBN/Kapamilya Channel
Ariel Con Tina (October 2, 1972 – 1974) Student Canteen (January 1975 – June 7, 1986) Lunch Date (June 9, 1986 – March 19, 1993) SST: Salo-Salo Together (March 20, 1993 – June 30, 1995) Eat Bulaga! (January 28, 1995 – January 5, 2024) Tahanang Pinakamasaya (January 6 – March 2, 2024) It's Showtime (April 6, 2024 – present; simulcast)	Student Canteen (July 21, 1958 – January 8, 1965) Magandang Tanghali (January 9, 1965 – September 27, 1968) Stop, Look, & Listen (September 28, 1968 – April 14, 1972) 12 O’ Clock High (April 15 – September 22, 1972) Katalog Pinggan (March 2, 1987 – February 17, 1989) Eat Bulaga! (February 18, 1989 – January 27, 1995) 'Sang Linggo nAPO Sila (February 4, 1995 – November 28, 1998) Magandang Tanghali Bayan (November 30, 1998 – February 21, 2003) Masayang Tanghali Bayan (February 22, 2003 – February 20, 2004) MTB: Ang Saya Saya (February 21, 2004 – February 4, 2005) Wowowee (February 5, 2005 – February 4, 2006, March 11, 2006 – May 4, 2010, May 5 – July 30, 2010) It's Showtime (October 24, 2009 – January 28, 2012, February 6, 2012 – present) Pilipinas Win Na Win (July 31 – December 31, 2010) Happy Yipee Yehey! (February 12, 2011 – February 4, 2012)
TV5
Hey It's Saberdey! (June 18, 2011 – February 4, 2012) Wowowillie (January 26 – October 12, 2013) Lunch Out Loud (October 19, 2020 – July 15, 2022) Tropang LOL (July 16, 2022 – April 29, 2023) It's Showtime (July 16, 2022 – June 30, 2023; simulcast) E.A.T. (July 1, 2023 – January 5, 2024) Eat Bulaga! (January 6, 2024 – present)

== List of weeklong noontime variety shows aired since 1958 ==
Series shaded in light blue are currently in production.

Length of current noontime shows are as of July 27, 2026. Noontime shows without specific dates of first and/or last broadcast were given approximate length of broadcast.

Series	Network	Length	First broadcast	Last broadcast
Student Canteen	ABS-CBN	32 years (approximate)	July 21, 1958	January 8, 1965
Student Canteen	GMA	32 years (approximate)	January 1975	June 7, 1986
Student Canteen	RPN/New Vision 9	32 years (approximate)	February 20, 1989	June 9, 1990
Magandang Tanghali	ABS-CBN	3 years and 9 months	January 9, 1965	September 27, 1968
Stop, Look, & Listen	ABS-CBN	3 years and 6 months	September 28, 1968	April 14, 1972
12 O’ Clock High	ABS-CBN	5 months	April 15, 1972	September 22, 1972
Ariel Con Tina	GMA	2 years (approximate)	October 2, 1972	1974
Lunch Break	GMA	1 year (approximate)	1974	January 1975
Eat Bulaga!	RPN*	47 years	July 30, 1979	February 17, 1989
Eat Bulaga!	ABS-CBN*	47 years	February 18, 1989	January 27, 1995
Eat Bulaga!	GMA* (worldwide: GMA Pinoy TV)	47 years	January 28, 1995	January 5, 2024
Eat Bulaga!	TV5* (worldwide: Kapatid Channel)	47 years	January 6, 2024	present
Eat Bulaga!	BuKo Channel*	47 years	January 6, 2024	January 15, 2024
Lunch Date	GMA	6 years, 9 days	June 9, 1986	March 19, 1993
Afternoon Delight	ABS-CBN	approximately one year	1988	February 17, 1989
SST: Salo-Salo Together	GMA	2 years, 3 months, 7 days	March 20, 1993	June 30, 1995
Chibugan Na	RPN	approximately 3 years	1993	1996
'Sang Linggo nAPO Sila	ABS-CBN	3 years, 9 months, 24 days	January 30, 1995	November 28, 1998
Magandang Tanghali Bayan	ABS-CBN	4 years, 2 months, 22 days	November 30, 1998	February 21, 2003
Alas Dose sa Trese	IBC	1 year, 3 months, 10 days	July 24, 1999	November 3, 2000
Esep Esep	ABS-CBN	3 weeks	August 7, 1999	August 27, 1999
Lunch Break	IBC	approximately two years	November 4, 2000	2002
Lunch Break Muna	IBC	approximately one year	2002	December 12, 2003
Masayang Tanghali Bayan	ABS-CBN	11 months, 29 days	February 22, 2003	February 20, 2004
MTB: Ang Saya Saya	ABS-CBN	11 months, 14 days	February 21, 2004	February 4, 2005
It's Chowtime	IBC	8 months, 19 months	May 17, 2004	February 4, 2005
Chowtime Na!	IBC	9 months, 4 days	February 5, 2005	November 8, 2005
Wowowee	ABS-CBN	5 years, 4 months, 18 days	February 5, 2005	February 4, 2006
Wowowee	ABS-CBN	5 years, 4 months, 18 days	March 11, 2006	May 4, 2010
Wowowee	ABS-CBN	5 years, 4 months, 18 days	May 5, 2010	July 30, 2010
Chowtime Na! Laban Na!	IBC	less than one year	November 9, 2005	2006
Chowtime: Conquest	IBC	approximately one year	2006	October 6, 2006
Diz Iz It!	GMA	5 months	February 8, 2010	July 24, 2010
Pilipinas Win Na Win	ABS-CBN	5 months	July 31, 2010	December 31, 2010
Happy Yipee Yehey!	ABS-CBN	11 months, 23 days	February 12, 2011	February 4, 2012
Hey, It's Saberday!	TV5	8 months	June 18, 2011	February 4, 2012
It's Showtime	ABS-CBN*	17 years	October 24, 2009	January 28, 2012
It's Showtime	ABS-CBN*	17 years	February 6, 2012	May 5, 2020
It's Showtime	Kapamilya Channel* (worldwide: TFC and iWant)	17 years	June 13, 2020	present
It's Showtime	A2Z*	17 years	October 10, 2020	present
It's Showtime	TV5*	17 years	July 16, 2022	June 30, 2023
It's Showtime	GTV*	17 years	July 1, 2023	December 31, 2024
It's Showtime	GMA* (worldwide: GMA Pinoy TV)	17 years	April 6, 2024	present
It's Showtime	All TV*	17 years	June 17, 2024	present
Wowowillie	TV5	8 months, 16 days	January 26, 2013	October 12, 2013
Happy Time	Net 25	12 months, 20 days	September 14, 2020	October 15, 2021
Tropang LOL (formerly known as Lunch Out Loud)	TV5 (worldwide: Kapatid Channel)	2 years and 6 months	October 19, 2020	April 29, 2023
Tropang LOL (formerly known as Lunch Out Loud)	Kapamilya Channel (worldwide: TFC and iWantTFC)	2 years and 6 months	July 16, 2022	April 29, 2023
Tropang LOL (formerly known as Lunch Out Loud)	A2Z	2 years and 6 months	July 16, 2022	April 29, 2023
Tropang LOL (formerly known as Lunch Out Loud)	Colours	2 years and 6 months	October 19, 2020	December 31, 2021
TiktoClock	GMA* (worldwide: GMA Pinoy TV)	4 years	July 25, 2022	present
TiktoClock	GTV*	4 years	April 8, 2024	September 13, 2024
It's Your Lucky Day	Kapamilya Channel (worldwide: TFC and iWantTFC)	approximately two weeks	October 14, 2023	October 27, 2023
It's Your Lucky Day	A2Z	approximately two weeks	October 14, 2023	October 27, 2023
It's Your Lucky Day	GTV	approximately two weeks	October 14, 2023	October 27, 2023
E.A.T.	TV5 (worldwide: Kapatid Channel)	6 months, 4 days	July 1, 2023	January 5, 2024
E.A.T.	One PH	6 months, 4 days	July 1, 2023	July 29, 2023
Tahanang Pinakamasaya	GMA (worldwide: GMA Pinoy TV)	approximately 1 month and 19 days	January 6, 2024	March 2, 2024
Wilyonaryo	WilTV	2 months	January 27, 2026	May 15, 2026

== See also ==
- TiktoClock
- It's Showtime
- Eat Bulaga!
- All-Out Sundays
- ASAP XP
- Vibe Plus Playback
- List of longest-running Philippine television series
