= Lovely Abella =

Filipino dancer and actress

Lovely Abella-Manalo
- Born: Lovely Abella; Manila, Philippines
- Other names: Ga, Love, Lovely
- Occupations: Actress, Television presenter, Dancer, Model
- Years active: 2005–present
- Agents: Talent5 (2010–2015); Sparkle GMA Artist Center (2015–present)
- Known for: Cristina, Bonifacia
- Spouse: Benj Manalo (m. 2021)
- Children: 2

Lovely Abella-Manalo is a Filipino dancer, host, comedian, model, entrepreneur, and an actress. She is currently under the management of Sparkle GMA Artist Center and GMA Network.

== Personal life ==
An ethnic Ilongga, Abella was born in Manila and raised in Koronadal, an Ilonggo-majority city in Mindanao. Her mother is from Bacolod while her father is from South Cotabato. She is married to actor Benj Manalo, with whom she has a son. Comedian Jose Manalo is her father-in-law. She also has a daughter from a previous relationship.

In August 2020, Abella contracted COVID-19. She was asymptomatic throughout her quarantine and eventually made a recovery.

== Career ==
During her teenage years, Abella said that she used to be one of the pranksters in Bitoy's Funniest Videos portraying as a massage therapist in Boracay to prank customers. According to her, this was her first-ever acting/comedy stint way back in 2004. This minor appearance opened doors for her as she was given a slot to be one of the Wowowee Dancers.

Abella was also previously known as one of the main dancers of Willie Revillame in Wil Time Bigtime when the latter moved to TV5, but was later promoted to a co-host due to her natural hosting skills and bubbly personality; giving her the opportunity to be one of the mainstays in Willie's game shows until Wowowillie. Her rising career in the network gave her many opportunities, such as guesting in various shows and even dedicating an episode for her in Star Confessions in which she shared her own life story.

Before she got her major break in GMA Network, Abella made a number of roles as an extra in various shows for both TV5 and GMA Network; most notably in Madam Chairman, Carmela, 2½ Daddies, and Buena Familia where she was left uncredited and unknown for that time being. She briefly had her comedic acting stint in A1 Ko Sa 'Yo before she got her major supporting role in Calle Siete as Bonifacia "Bonnie" Suarez.

Her biggest break in GMA Network was when she auditioned to be one of the cast members of the weekend noon-time variety show, Sunday PinaSaya where she shortly appeared as a guest before becoming a mainstay cast. Due to her potentials in comedy, she was included as a new Bubble Gang member. Even though she's been exposed to comedy shows as of now, she's still undergoing drama and acting workshops to improve her craft.

Abella was cast in the prime-time series, D' Originals, where she played her first-ever major antagonist role as Cristina "Tina" Pineda, a rival and the half-sister of Marge. She has since been frequently cast in various drama series and anthologies offered by GMA Network and GMA News TV.

== Filmography ==
=== Film ===
Year	Title	Role	Notes
2009	Nobody, Nobody But...Juan	Wowowee dancer	Cameo appearance
2016	Imagine You and Me	Kaye Malinao	First movie appearance
2017	Trip Ubusan: The Lolas vs. Zombies	Abigail "Abe" Salazar	Second movie appearance
2019	Hello, Love, Goodbye	Gina Mariquit	Supporting role
2024	Hello, Love, Again	Gina Mariquit	Special participation
2025	My Love Will Make You Disappear	Abigail "Abby" Bartolome	Supporting role

=== Television ===
Year	Title	Role(s)
2010	Wil Time Bigtime	Herself / Performer
2012	Wowowillie	Herself / Performer
2016	Wowowin	Herself / Guest / Co-host
2016	Calle Siete	Bonifacia "Bonnie" Suarez
2016	Sunday PinaSaya	Herself / co-host
2017–2022	Bubble Gang	Herself / Various roles
2017	Magpakailanman: Ang Batang Binihag ng Kulto	Daisy
2017	Wagas: My Big Sexy Love	Francine Prieto
2017	D' Originals	Cristina "Tina" Pineda
2017	Dear Uge: Kabit si Yaya	Monica
2017	Karelasyon: Magnanakaw ng Puso	Ana
2017	Wagas: Gayuma ni Kumare	Den
2017	Hay, Bahay!	Ella
2017	Follow your Heart	Herself / Player
2017	Sarap Diva	Herself
2017	Tunay na Buhay	Herself
2017	Sarap Diva	Herself
2017	All Star Videoke	Herself / Contestant
2017	Wagas: Babaeng Syokoy	Teresita
2017	Celebrity Bluff	Herself / Contestant
2017	Daig Kayo ng Lola Ko: Sleeping Rosa	Dorcas Rosas
2017	Tadhana: Love Rehab	Irma
2017	The Lolas' Beautiful Show	Herself / Guest
2017	Dear Uge: Segunda Mommy	Apple
2017	Wagas: Haunted Manyika	Helen
2017	Road Trip: Samar	Herself / Guest Traveler
2018	Day Off	Herself / Guest
2018	Magpakailanman: Mula Asawa Hanggang Awa (A Married Woman's Story)	Aliza
2018	All Star Videoke	Herself / Contestant
2018	All Access	Herself
2018	Dear Uge: Kuwentong Barya	Liwayway
2018	Celebrity Bluff	Herself / Contestant
2018	Wagas: Love Moves	Rio
2018	The Stepdaughters	Mylene Depositorio
2018	Dear Uge: I Hate You, I Love You	Princess
2018	Maynila: Bubble Gum Romance	Emily Bartolome
2018	Ika-5 Utos	Gwen
2018	Wagas: Dear Preacher Husband	Abby
2019	Dear Uge: Louise-Vi-Ton	Louise
2019	Magpakailanman: Fathers and Lovers	Rosella
2019	Dragon Lady	Ginger Garcia
2019	Dear Uge: Chubby-yutiful	Lydia
2019	Wagas Presents: Throwback Pag-ibig	Kristine Liam
2019	One of the Baes	Mad Woman / Guest
2019	Magkaagaw	Suzanna "Suzi" Gomez
2023–2024	Linlang	Emma
2024–2025	Lilet Matias: Attorney-at-Law	Vivian
