= Super Tekla =

Filipino actor, comedian and television host

- Born: Romeo Librada; January 13, 1982 (age 44); Pigcawayan, Cotabato, Philippines
- Notable work: Wowowin; The Boobay and Tekla Show

Comedy career
- Years active: 2016–present
- Medium: Television
- Genres: Observational comedy; stand-up comedy; slapstick

Romeo Librada (born January 13, 1982), known professionally as Super Tekla or simply Tekla, is a Filipino actor, comedian and television host. He is best known for appearing in GMA Network's variety show, Wowowin as one of its hosts.

== Early life ==
Librada was born in the small town of Pigcawayan, a town in Cotabato wherein he was raised by the Manobo tribe and was trained to be a farmer. His mother died at an early age, according to him. Due to this, he supported his own education until he finished high school. He has seven siblings.

== Career ==
=== Stand-up comedy ===
Out of curiosity, Librada went alone to Manila wherein he found himself singing on stage at malls and comedy bars for fun. He was then discovered and got regular stints as a singer first, then a stand-up comedian, at a popular comedy bar. He is best known for his Celine Dion and Whitney Houston voice impersonations.

=== Television ===
In 2016, Librada appeared as a contestant in GMA Network's game show, Wowowin main host Willie Revillame saw his potential in comedy and hired him as one of his co-hosts. He later formed a comedic duo with Donita Nose in the said show. A year after, he was allegedly fired by Revillame due to his alcoholic and gambling vices, in which Librada denied. On 2020, he was once welcomed again by Wowowin after guesting.

In 2017, Librada was signed by GMA Artist Center and appeared on several GMA Network shows like Alyas Robin Hood, Trops, and Celebrity Bluff.

In 2018, Librada got his first major role in Inday Will Always Love You when he was cast as Kimberlou, the gay sidekick of lead actress Barbie Forteza. His life story has been featured on the Kapuso drama anthology Magpakailanman, which gained high ratings for the show. Since then, he has been guested by the drama show twice, appearing in various true-to-life lead roles.

He is currently hosting comedy talk show The Boobay and Tekla Show along with comedian Boobay.

== Personal life ==
Although visually presented as gay, Librada identifies himself as a straight man. He has a daughter from his ex-wife named Irene Gonzales.

=== Sexual misconduct allegation ===
In October 2020, Librada's live-in partner, Michelle Bana-ag, alleged in Raffy Tulfo in Action that the comedian had repeatedly sexually abused her and her child from an earlier marriage. This included demanding sexual intercourse in exchange for food while Michelle was ailing due to side-effects of contraceptive injection. Librada denied any wrongdoing, contending he would never rape Bana-ag as he has a daughter. Librada was later exonerated when Bana-ag was unable to provide sufficient evidence against the comedian, and testimonies from Librada's colleagues revealed past abuses from Bana-ag, namely her methamphetamine addiction as well as her lesbian relationship with a female partner. This ultimately led to Raffy Tulfo withdrawing his previous pledge to support Bana-ag after the latter declined to take a drug test to prove her innocence.

== Filmography ==
=== Film ===
Year	Title	Role
2019	Kiko en Lala	Kiko / Lala

=== Television ===
Year	Title	Role
2016–2018; 2020	Wowowin	Himself / Co-host
2017	Celebrity Bluff	Himself / Celebrity Bluffer
2017	Trops	Tiffany Peneda
2017	Sunday PinaSaya	Himself / Performer
2017	Alyas Robin Hood	Yvonne Lady
2018	Daig Kayo ng Lola Ko: Tatlong Bibe	Bibingi
2018	All Star Videoke	All Star Laglager
2018	Inday Will Always Love You	Kimberlou
2018	Studio 7	Host
2019–present	The Boobay and Tekla Show	Host
2019	Magpakailanman: Lotto Winner naging Loser	Erwin
2020	All-Out Sundays	Co-host / Performer
2024	It's Showtime	Himself / Guest / Performer
