= Wowowillie =

2013 Philippine noontime variety show

- Genre: Variety show, comedy
- Developed by: Willie Revillame
- Written by: Cecille Matutina; Rod Divinagarcia; Victor Villareal; Weshlynne Dizon
- Directed by: John Paul Panizales
- Creative director: Willie Revillame
- Presented by: Willie Revillame and others
- Theme music composer: Lito Camo
- Opening theme: "Wowowillie" by Lito Camo
- Country of origin: Philippines
- Original language: Filipino

Production
- Executive producer: Gary Tejada
- Producer: Willie Revillame
- Production locations: TV5 Delta Studio or Wowowillie Studio (Quezon Avenue, Quezon City, Metro Manila, Philippines)
- Camera setup: Multiple-camera setup
- Running time: 150 minutes (weekdays); 180 minutes (Saturdays)
- Production companies: TV5; Wil Productions, Inc. (now WBR Entertainment Productions)

Original release
- Network: TV5; Kapatid TV5
- Release: January 26 – October 12, 2013

Related
- Wowowee; Willing Willie / Wil Time Bigtime; Wowowin; Wil To Win; Wilyonaryo

Wowowillie is a Philippine television variety show broadcast by TV5. Hosted by Willie Revillame, it aired from January 26 to October 12, 2013. The show earned the distinction of being the only noontime program to have a Strong Parental Guidance (SPG) rating from the MTRCB, which was imposed due to the dancers' provocative outfits.

Revillame admitted in an interview in September 2013 that the show's ratings "fell below expectations" and contemplated on a possible cancellation. The show aired its final episode on October 12, 2013, nearly nine months after its debut. Wil To Win later premiered in 2024.

== History ==
Revillame's previous show Wil Time Bigtime ended its run on January 5, 2013, as he announced in late 2012, and moved to the noontime slot under the title Wowowillie. It premiered on January 26, 2013, to coincide with the host's birthday the day after.

=== Cancellation ===
Citing competition from rival variety shows It's Showtime and Eat Bulaga!, TV5 confirmed Revillame's announcement expressing his intent on cancelling Wowowillie and focusing on other commitments, as the show struggled to gain a significant audience share.

On October 12, 2013, Wowowillie aired its final episode, with Revillame bidding farewell to his audience and crew in a speech. No further plans were announced regarding a possible replacement to the program. In 2020, TV5 announces its new noontime variety show Lunch Out Loud as blocktimer program between its affiliate Cignal Entertainment and Brightlight Productions of Albee Benitez as replacement for Wowowillie.

=== New show ===
On March 20, 2015, Revillame announced that he would sign a program contract with GMA Network to air a new program, Wowowin. The program would be his return to television after he went on hiatus. Wowowin will be self-produced by Revillame's WBR Entertainment Productions, and former Wowowillie host and friend Randy Santiago will serve as the program's director. Also, the program marks Revillame's return to his original mother network, GMA Network, after hosting Lunch Date in the late 1980s with Randy Santiago. Wowowin premiered on May 10, 2015, on the Sunday Grande sa Hapon afternoon block of GMA Network and was aired internationally via GMA Pinoy TV.

== Hosts ==
=== Main hosts ===
- Willie Revillame
- Randy Santiago

=== Co-hosts ===
- Mariel Rodriguez
- Grace Lee
- Camille Villar
- Arci Muñoz
- Ethel Booba
- Ate Gay
- Rufa Mae Quinto
- Nina Girado
- Abra
- Lovely Abella
- Ava Jugueta

=== Featuring ===
- Anna Feliciano
- Owen Ercia
- Jeff Vasquez
- DJ Coki
- Wowowillie Money Girls
  - AJ Suller as Ligaya
  - Sandy Tolentino (of SexBomb Girls) as Liwayway
- Wowowillie Girls

== Segments ==
- BigaTEN ka!
- Rock 'n Rollin'
- Tutok to Win sa Tanghali
- JOK Sing
- Mini Consyerto
- Putukan Na!
- ATN (Ayos The Number)
- InstaJAM (every Saturday)
- Willie of Fortune
- Pera S' Wil
- Jackpot Sa Surf
- Cash Salo

== Studios ==
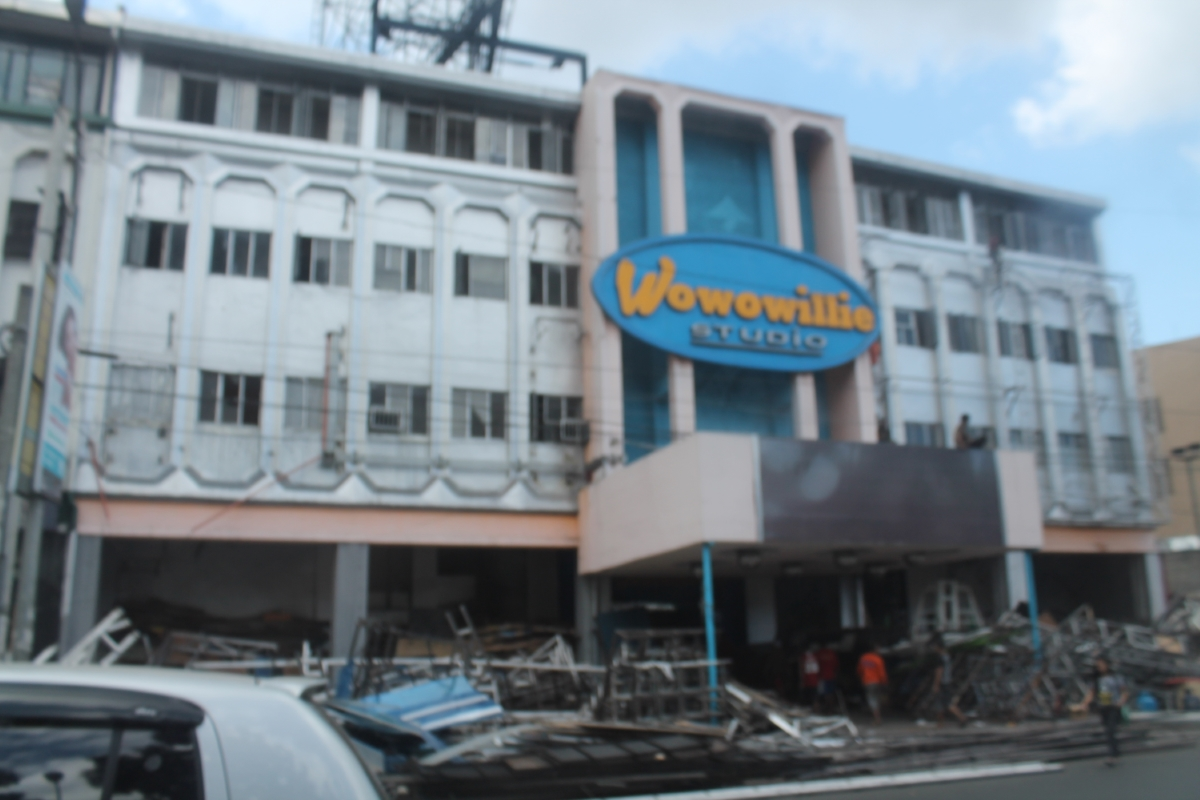
Former location of the Wowowillie studio, REDEVT Delta Studio in Quezon City

- TV5 Delta Studio - Quezon Avenue, Quezon City (2013)

== Ratings ==
Wowowillie failed to surpass expectations in terms of TV ratings. The show's ratings were ranging from 3 to 5% and sometimes falling below 3%, while rivals GMA Network's Eat Bulaga! and ABS-CBN's It's Showtime ratings were ranging from 13 to 16% based on Kantar Media Philippines.

== See also ==
- List of TV5 (Philippine TV network) original programming
- Wil Time Bigtime
- Wil To Win
- Wilyonaryo
