= Wil To Win =

Philippine television variety show

- Title card
- Genre: Variety game show
- Created by: Willie Revillame; TV5 Network
- Written by: Cecille Matutina; Robin Sison; Raymund Roland Navarro; Toni Rose Espartero
- Directed by: Randy Santiago (2024–25); Arnel Natividad; Ferdinand "Yuki" Cruz
- Creative director: Willie Revillame
- Presented by: Willie Revillame; Randy Santiago
- Theme music composer: Lito Camo
- Opening theme: "Wil to Win" by Willie Revillame
- Country of origin: Philippines
- Original language: Filipino
- No. of episodes: 134

Production
- Executive producers: Jane Jimenez-Basas; Guido R. Zaballero
- Producers: Sienna G. Olasco; Peter Edward G. Dizon; Carmencita Villavert
- Production locations: Studio A, TV5 Broadcast Complex, 762 Quirino Highway, Novaliches, Quezon City
- Camera setup: Multiple-camera setup
- Running time: 90 minutes (July 15–26, 2024; September 16, 2024 – February 10, 2025); 120 minutes (July 29 – September 13, 2024); 60 minutes (February 11 – April 25, 2025)
- Production companies: MQuest Ventures; WinQuest Productions

Original release
- Network: TV5
- Release: July 14, 2024 – April 25, 2025

Related
- Wowowee; Willing Willie / Wil Time Bigtime; Wowowillie; Wowowin; Wilyonaryo

Wil To Win is a Philippine television variety game show broadcast by TV5. Hosted by Willie Revillame and Randy Santiago, it aired on the network's TodoMax Primetime Singko line up and worldwide on Kapatid Channel from July 14, 2024, to April 25, 2025, replacing Barangay Singko Panalo and was replaced by the second wave of Frontline Express and the rerun of Sa Ngalan ng Ina.

== History ==
On June 14, 2024, Willie Revillame confirmed that his new program, Wil To Win, would debut on TV5 that marked his return to the network after over eleven years since Wil Time Bigtime (formerly Willing Willie). The show produced by MQuest Ventures, which Revillame partnered with in April 2024. A live television special, titled "WIL-come Back Party", was aired on Sunday, July 14 to celebrate the show's launch; the special event was held at the New Frontier Theater.

Regular programming commenced on July 15, every Mondays to Fridays from 17:00 to 18:30 (PST). On July 29, 2024, the show extended its time slot from 16:30 to 18:30 (PST). On September 16, the time slot reverted to 17:00 (PST) after removing a segment. In October, several female hosts had been removed from the show.

On February 3, 2025, the show quietly began simulcasting on RPTV, but only when there are no live sporting events (e.g., PBA games) or special programming scheduled on the channel. On February 10, Revillame temporarily left the show to run for senator; Randy Santiago became the show's substitute host. The show subsequently reduced its airing time to an hour starting February 11. It aired its final episode on April 25, 2025, entering a “season break.”

On July 3, 2025, it was announced via the Wil to Win Facebook page that Willie Revillame would be returning to television, just two months after losing the 2025 Senate election. However, due to Wowowin coming back for TV5, and Wilyonaryo, a new game show and current online platform, the series would not be returning from its so-called "season break", therefore ending the series.

== Hosts ==
=== Main hosts ===
- Willie Revillame (2024–25)
- Randy Santiago (2025)

=== Co-hosts ===
- Almira Teng (2024–25)
- Inday Fatima (2024–25)
- Camille Canlas (2025)

=== Former co-hosts ===
- Ana Ramsey (2024)
- Boobsie Wonderland (2024)
- Donita Nose (2024)
- Christine Bermas (2024)
- Cindy Miranda (2024)
- Gab Basiano (2024)
- MJ Cayabyab (2024)
- Roberta Tamondong (2024)
- Sam Verzosa (2024)

== Segments ==
- Cash Salo (2024)
- Cookie to Win (2024)
- Hello Willie (2024)
- Hep Hep Hooray (2024)
- Pera o Kahon (2024–25)
- Putukan Na! (2024)
- Song Tanong (2024–25)
- Spin a Wil (2024)
- Willie of Fortune (2024–25)
- Patalbugan (2025)
- Sakorera (2024)
