= Donita Nose =

Filipino comedian, actor and TV host

- Born: Rodello Juntos Solano; June 29, 1979 (age 47); Makati, Philippines
- Other names: Ogie, Donita
- Occupations: Comedian; actor; TV host; comedy bar host
- Years active: 2005–present
- Agent: GMA Artist Center
- Known for: Wowowin, CelebriTV
- Website: Donita Nose on InstagramDonita Nose on X

Rodello Juntos Solano (born June 29, 1979), known professionally as Donita Nose, is a Filipino comic, actress and TV host on GMA Network. She is best known as a transgender comic in Punch Line and Klownz together with other celebrities in showbiz like Super Tekla, Iyah, Boobay and Ate Gay. Nose is also known as one of the television hosts of Wowowin, together with Super Tekla and Willie Revillame. She also impersonates the actress and MTV VJ Donita Rose, where her screen name was taken from.

On 27 July 2020, Nose tested positive for COVID-19, after she experienced symptoms of the disease.

== Filmography ==
=== Film ===
Year	Title	Role
2012	This Guy's in Love With U Mare	Stand-up comedian himself

=== Television ===
Year	Title	Role
2008	Wowowee	Herself / Guest / Performer
2015; 2026	It's Showtime	Herself / Guest / Performer
2015–2017; 2019	Wowowin	Herself / Host
2016	Celebrity Bluff	Herself / Back-up comedian
2016	CelebriTV	Herself / Performer
2016	Dear Uge	Vivien
2017	Magpakailanman: Donita Nose Story	Herself
2017	Magpakailanman: Boobay Story	Boobay
2018	The Stepdaughters	Ariana
2021; 2025	Sing Galing!	Herself / Host
2026	Family Feud	Herself / Contestant Players
2018–2019	Studio 7	Herself / Performer
2023	It's Showtime	Herself / Contestant
2024	Wil To Win	Herself / Guest Co-Host
2024	Face to Face	Herself / Host

== See also ==
- Donita Rose
- Willie Revillame
- Petite (comedian)
- Ate Gay
- Super Tekla
