= Wilyonaryo =

- Genre: Variety game show
- Created by: Willie Revillame; TV5 Network
- Creative director: Willie Revillame
- Presented by: Willie Revillame
- Theme music composer: Lito Camo
- Opening theme: Maging MILYONARYO sa WILYONARYO (Wilyonaryo Theme Song) by Willie Revillame
- Country of origin: Philippines
- Original language: Filipino / Tagalog
- No. of episodes: 76

Production
- Producer: Willie Revillame
- Production locations: Wil Tower Mall, Quezon City, Metro Manila, Philippines
- Camera setup: Multiple-camera setup
- Production companies: MQuest Ventures; WinQuest Productions

Original release
- Release: January 25 – May 15, 2026

Related
- Wowowee; Willing Willie / Wil Time Bigtime; Wowowillie; Wowowin; Wil To Win

Wilyonaryo is a Philippine television variety game show which was broadcast on the WilTV website. Hosted by Willie Revillame, it aired from January 25 to May 15, 2026.

== History ==
Game show host Willie Revillame announced in July 2025, that he will return to television after his unsuccessful candidacy for Senator in the 2025 Philippine Senate election. He previously hosted Wil To Win on both TV5 and RPTV.

Wowowin reportedly will be revived as well as a second program called Wilyonaryo. Wilyonaryo shares the same name as the segment in the previous run of Wowowee on ABS-CBN.

On November 2, 2025, Revillame released a teaser for Wilyonaryo.

Revillame confirms his return to TV5 amidst rumors to the contrary with a contract signing with TV5, MediaQuest, and Cignal, on November 28, 2025. As part of the agreement, Revillame was given a channel slot known as WilTV where Wilyonaryo aired. There were plans to air the game show in TV5 but was put on hold due to portions involving gambling, specifically a raffle game.

WilTV began its test broadcast on Cignal TV on December 3, 2025, at 12:00 a.m., signaling the network's formal preparation for the channel's launch and the anticipated television return of Revillame. Aside from Wilyonaryo, there were plans to make the television network host the broadcast of public service program Willingly Yours, which was originally aired on ABS-CBN. On December 16, 2025, WilTV officially launched its YouTube channel.

Wilyonaryo was originally to premiere on December 21, 2025. This was later postponed to January 25, 2026, due to the expansion of the studio in Mandaluyong.

On January 25, 2026, Wilyonaryo made its premiere on its own website.

On January 27, 2026, Wilyonaryo moved to 12:00 p.m. slot on the same time with the sister program Eat Bulaga!. The program concluded on May 15, 2026 as it failed to attract ratings and advertisers loathe to be associated with a program featuring a gambling. Revillame is instead focusing on reviving his popular game show, Wowowin, which is set to return with a new studio sometime around 2026 to 2027.
