= Kiko en Lala =

2019 Filipino comedy film

- Directed by: Adolfo B. Alix Jr.
- Produced by: Jose Mari Abacan; Annette Gozon-Valdes
- Starring: Super Tekla
- Cinematography: Jhapz Bagnas
- Edited by: Adolfo B. Alix Jr.; Mark Sucgang
- Music by: Mikoy Morales
- Production company: Backyard Productions
- Distributed by: GMA Pictures
- Release date: September 25, 2019
- Running time: 96 minutes
- Country: Philippines
- Languages: Filipino; English

Kiko en Lala is a 2019 Philippine comedy film directed by Adolfo B. Alix Jr. The film stars Super Tekla in his movie debut. Produced by GMA Pictures' subsidiary Backyard Productions, the film was initially titled Kambal Karnabal.

The film is streaming online on YouTube.

== Cast ==
- Super Tekla as Kiko / Lala
- Derrick Monasterio as Rap-rap
- Kim Domingo as Aning
- Kiray Celis as Miracle
- Jo Berry as Tadhana
- Divine Tetay as Wagas
- Ai-Ai de las Alas as Deadline
- Gia Navarro as a waitress
- Ken Chan as Boyet
- Rita Daniela as Aubrey

== Release ==
The film was slated to be released in May 2019. But due to film enhancements, its release date was moved to September 25, 2019.
