= List of The Stepdaughters episodes =

The Stepdaughters is a 2018 Philippine television drama series broadcast by GMA Network, starring Megan Young and Katrina Halili. It premiered on February 12, 2018 on the network's Afternoon Prime line up. Also worldwide via GMA Pinoy TV. The series concluded on October 19, 2018, with a total of 178 episodes.

NUTAM (Nationwide Urban Television Audience Measurement) People in Television Homes ratings are provided by AGB Nielsen Philippines, and but its the 35th-week run.

== Series overview ==
Season	Episodes	Originally released	
Season	Episodes	First released	Last released
1	178	February 12, 2018	October 19, 2018

== Episodes ==
=== February 2018 ===
Episode		Original air date	Social media hashtag	AGB Nielsen NUTAM People in Television Homes			Ref.
Episode		Original air date	Social media hashtag	Rating	Timeslot rank	Whole day rank	Ref.
1	"Pilot"	February 12, 2018	#TheStepdaughters	6.5%	#1	#8	
2	"Malas o Swerte" (Bad Luck or Good Luck)	February 13, 2018	#TSDMalasOSwerte	6.3%	#1	#9	
3	"Pamilya o Prinsipyo" (Family or Principle)	February 14, 2018	#TSDPamilyaOPrinsipyo	6.8%	#1	#10	
4	"Mayumi vs. Isabelle"	February 15, 2018	#TSDMayumiVsIsabelle	6.8%	#1	#8	
5	"Lumiliit na Mundo" (Small World)	February 16, 2018	#TSDLumiliitNaMundo	8.5%	#1	#6	
6	"Biro ng Tadhana" (Joke of Destiny)	February 19, 2018	#TSDBiroNgTadhana	7.1%	#1		
7	"Utang na Loob" (Obligation)	February 20, 2018	#TSDUtangNaLoob	6.9%	#1		
8	"Sugod Bahay" (Dash House)	February 21, 2018	#TSDSugodBahay	6.4%	#1		
9	"Mayumi Meets Francis"	February 22, 2018	#TSDMayumiMeetsFrancis	7.2%	#1		
10	"Suspetsa" (Suspicion)	February 23, 2018	#TSDSuspetsa	7.1%	#1		
11	"Akusasyon" (Accusation)	February 26, 2018	#TSDAkusasyon	6.6%	#1		
12	"Palagayang Loob" (Inner Feelings)	February 27, 2018	#TSDPalagayangLoob	6.5%	#1		
13	"Mami vs. Ramen"	February 28, 2018	#TSDMamiVsRamen	6.2%	#1		
Average				6.8%			

=== March 2018 ===
Episode		Original air date	Social media hashtag	AGB Nielsen NUTAM People in Television Homes			Ref.
Episode		Original air date	Social media hashtag	Rating	Timeslot rank	Whole day rank	Ref.
14	"Hinala" (Suspicion)	March 1, 2018	#TSDHinala	5.7%	#1	#12	
15	"Sabotahe" (Sabotage)	March 2, 2018	#TSDSabotahe	6.0%	#1	#11	
16	"Mastermind"	March 5, 2018	#TSDMastermind	6.2%	#1	#11	
17	"Suliranin" (Problematic)	March 6, 2018	#TSDSuliranin	5.7%	#1	#11	
18	"Pag-amin" (Confession)	March 7, 2018	#TSDPagAmin	5.5%	#1	#11	
19	"Paghaharap" (Confrontation)	March 8, 2018	#TSDPaghaharap	5.9%	#1	#12	
20	"Nakakagulat na Alok" (Shocking Offer)	March 9, 2018	#TSDNakakagulatNaAlok	5.6%	#1	#13	
21	"Paglayas" (Getting Out)	March 12, 2018	#TSDPaglayas	5.9%	#1	#12	
22	"Impiyerno" (Hell)	March 13, 2018	#TSDImpiyerno	5.8%	#1	#11	
23	"Matinding Pakiusap" (Intense Please)	March 14, 2018	#TSDMatindingPakiusap	5.8%	#1	#12	
24	"Pamamahiya" (Embarrassment)	March 15, 2018	#TSDPamamahiya	5.9%	#1	#11	
25	"Trespasser"	March 16, 2018	#TSDTrespasser	6.4%	#1	#10	
26	"Kapwa Palaban" (Mutual Defense)	March 19, 2018	#TSDKapwaPalaban				
27	"Bullseye"	March 20, 2018	#TSDBullseye				
28	"Asal Hayop" (Animal Behavior)	March 21, 2018	#TSDAsalHayop				
29	"Praning"	March 22, 2018	#TSDPraning				
30	"Masamang Balak" (Bad Intention)	March 23, 2018	#TSDMasamangBalak	5.1%	#1	#11	
31	"Boomerang"	March 26, 2018	#TSDBoomerang	5.2%	#1	#12	
32	"Golddigger"	March 27, 2018	#TSDGolddigger	5.2%	#2	#13	
33	"Napahamak" (Lost)	March 28, 2018	#TSDNapahamak				
Average							

=== April 2018 ===
Episode		Original air date	Social media hashtag	AGB Nielsen NUTAM People in Television Homes			Ref.
Episode		Original air date	Social media hashtag	Rating	Timeslot rank	Whole day rank	Ref.
34	"Matinding Bintang" (Intense Imputation)	April 2, 2018	#TSDMatindingBintang				
35	"Hot Seat"	April 3, 2018	#TSDHotSeat				
36	"Sorpresa" (Surprise)	April 4, 2018	#TSDSorpresa				
37	"Sikreto" (Secret)	April 5, 2018	#TSDSikreto				
38	"Nakaw na Halik" (Stolen Kiss)	April 6, 2018	#TSDNakawNaHalik				
39	"Paranoid"	April 9, 2018	#TSDParanoid				
40	"Lotto Sikreto" (Lottery Secret)	April 10, 2018	#TSDLottoSikreto				
41	"Truth Hurts"	April 11, 2018	#TSDTruthHurts				
42	"Galit" (Anger)	April 12, 2018	#TSDGalit	6.9%	#1		
43	"Buking" (Seen)	April 13, 2018	#TSDBuking				
44	"Major Revelation"	April 16, 2018	#TSDMajorRevelation				
45	"Watak-watak" (Ruin)	April 17, 2018	#TSDWatakWatak	7.0%	#1		
46	"Swapang" (Greedy)	April 18, 2018	#TSDSwapang				
47	"War Freak"	April 19, 2018	#TSDWarFreak	7.5%	#1		
48	"Senyales" (Signs)	April 20, 2018	#TSDSenyales				
49	"Panganib" (Danger)	April 23, 2018	#TSDPanganib				
50	"Raising Hell"	April 24, 2018	#TSDRaisingHell	6.7%	#1		
51	"Matinding Unos" (Severe Storm)	April 25, 2018	#TSDMatindingUnos	6.7%	#1		
52	"Windang" (Torn)	April 26, 2018	#TSDWindang				
53	"Dagok" (Misfortune)	April 27, 2018	#TSDDagok				
54	"Pagdududa" (Doubt)	April 30, 2018	#TSDPagdududa				
Average							

=== May 2018 ===
Episode		Original air date	Social media hashtag	AGB Nielsen NUTAM People in Television Homes			Ref.
Episode		Original air date	Social media hashtag	Rating	Timeslot rank	Whole day rank	Ref.
55	"Pagpapaamin" (Affection)	May 1, 2018	#TSDPagpapaamin				
56	"Pagbangon" (Rising)	May 2, 2018	#TSDPagbangon				
57	"Hiwalay na Buhay" (Separate Lives)	May 3, 2018	#TSDHiwalayNaBuhay				
58	"Bubog" (Broken Glass)	May 4, 2018	#TSDBubog				
59	"Kalbaryo" (Calvary)	May 7, 2018	#TSDKalbaryo	7.0%	#1		
60	"Bistado" (Busted)	May 8, 2018	#TSDBistado	7.9%	#1		
61	"Sampal ng Katotohanan" (Slap of Truth)	May 9, 2018	#TSDSampalNgKatotohanan	8.6%	#1		
62	"Karapatan" (Right)	May 10, 2018	#TSDKarapatan	7.9%	#1		
63	"Bundol" (Bump)	May 11, 2018	#TSDBundol	7.5%	#1		
64	"Salisi" (Opposite Direction)	May 14, 2018	#TSDSalisi				
65	"Pag-aalala" (Worrying)	May 15, 2018	#TSDPagaalala				
66	"Unahan" (Race)	May 16, 2018	#TSDUnahan	7.2%	#1		
67	"Sorry"	May 17, 2018	#TSDSorry	6.3%	#1		
68	"Abduction"	May 18, 2018	#TSDAbduction	7.1%	#1		
69	"Peligro" (Risk)	May 21, 2018	#TSDPeligro	7.4%	#1		
70	"Tapang" (Courage)	May 22, 2018	#TSDTapang	6.9%	#1		
71	"Pakiusap" (Please)	May 23, 2018	#TSDPakiusap	7.1%	#1		
72	"Bangaan" (Crashing)	May 24, 2018	#TSDBangaan	7.7%	#1		
73	"Delikado" (Dangerous)	May 25, 2018	#TSDDelikado				
74	"Boses" (Voice)	May 28, 2018	#TSDBoses				
75	"Salisihan" (Changing)	May 29, 2018	#TSDSalisihan				
76	"Kontrolado" (Controlled)	May 30, 2018	#TSDKontrolado				
77	"Found"	May 31, 2018	#TSDFound				
Average							

=== June 2018 ===
Episode		Original air date	Social media hashtag	AGB Nielsen NUTAM People in Television Homes			Ref.
Episode		Original air date	Social media hashtag	Audience Share	Timeslot rank	Whole day rank	Ref.
78	"Rejected"	June 1, 2018	#TSDRejected				
79	"Pagbawi" (Recovery)	June 4, 2018	#TSDPagbawi	5.6%	#1		
80	"Sad Birthday"	June 5, 2018	#TSDSadBirthday	6.3%	#1		
81	"Pagsabog" (Explosion)	June 6, 2018	#TSDPagsabog	5.8%	#1		
82	"Sunog" (Fire)	June 7, 2018	#TSDSunog	7.3%	#1		
83	"Pamilya o Pag-ibig?" (Family or Love?)	June 8, 2018	#TSDPamilyaOPagIbig	6.9%	#1		
84	"Sambulat" (Compress)	June 11, 2018	#TSDSambulat	7.5%	#1		
85	"Nadarang"	June 12, 2018	#TSDNadarang	8.5%	#1		
86	"Nasaan ang Hustisya?" (Where's the Justice?)	June 13, 2018	#TSDNasaanAngHustisya	7.2%	#1		
87	"Salpukan" (Collision)	June 14, 2018	#TSDSalpukan	7.3%	#1		
88	"Lipstick"	June 15, 2018	#TSDLipstick	8.0%	#1		
89	"Desperada" (Desperate)	June 18, 2018	#TSDDesperada	5.9%	#1		
90	"Mahalagang Impormasyon" (Important Information)	June 19, 2018	#TSDMahalagangImpormasyon	6.0%	#1		
91	"Menor"	June 20, 2018	#TSDMenor				
92	"Muntikan" (Injected)	June 21, 2018	#TSDMuntikan				
93	"Secret Weapon"	June 22, 2018	#TSDSecretWeapon				
94	"Reunited"	June 25, 2018	#TSDReunited	7.2%	#1		
95	"Banta" (Threat)	June 26, 2018	#TSDBanta	6.3%	#1		
96	"Survival"	June 27, 2018	#TSDSurvival	6.2%	#1		
97	"Danger"	June 28, 2018	#TSDDanger	5.6%	#1		
98	"Roro"	June 29, 2018	#TSDRoro	6.4%	#1		
Average							

=== July 2018 ===
Episode		Original air date	Social media hashtag	AGB Nielsen NUTAM People in Television Homes			Ref.
Episode		Original air date	Social media hashtag	Rating	Timeslot rank	Whole day rank	Ref.
99	"Walang Kawala" (No Escape)	July 2, 2018	#TSDWalangKawala	5.9%	#1		
100	"Adrift"	July 3, 2018	#TSDAdrift	5.4%	#1		
101	"God's Plan"	July 4, 2018	#TSDGodsPlan	6.2%	#1		
102	"Kosa" (Prison)	July 5, 2018	#TSDKosa	6.4%	#1		
103	"Tagu-taguan" (Hide and Seek)	July 6, 2018	#TSDTaguTaguan	6.7%	#1		
104	"Rest in Peace"	July 9, 2018	#TSDRestInPeace	6.4%	#1		
105	"Unexpected"	July 10, 2018	#TSDUnexpected	5.7%	#1		
106	"Buhos ng Galit" (Pouring Anger)	July 11, 2018	#TSDBuhosNgGalit	6.9%	#1		
107	"Kasabwat" (Accomplice)	July 12, 2018	#TSDKasabwat	7.1%	#1		
108	"Kakampi o Kaaway?" (Ally or Enemy?)	July 13, 2018	#TSDKakampiOKaaway	6.5%	#1		
109	"Tiwala" (Trust)	July 16, 2018	#TSDTiwala	6.6%	#1		
110	"Red vs. Red"	July 17, 2018	#TSDRedVsRed	6.8%	#1		
111	"Pagtaob" (Turn Over)	July 18, 2018	#TSDPagtaob	7.8%	#1		
112	"Tapatan" (Competition)	July 19, 2018	#TSDTapatan	6.4%	#1		
113	"Bilasa" (Putresence)	July 20, 2018	#TSDBilasa	6.8%	#1		
114	"Pamahiin" (Superstition)	July 23, 2018	#TSDPamahiin	6.8%	#1		
115	"Sunog" (Fire)	July 24, 2018	#TSDSunog	6.5%	#1		
116	"Naabo" (Ashed)	July 25, 2018	#TSDNaabo	5.8%	#1		
117	"Kasalanan" (Sin)	July 26, 2018	#TSDKasalanan	5.3%	#1		
118	"Ganti" (Revenge)	July 27, 2018	#TSDGanti	6.7%	#1		
119	"Sigaw ng Hustisya" (Shout of Justice)	July 30, 2018	#TSDSigawNgHustisya	5.7%	#1		
120	"Buhay na Pag-asa" (Hopeful Life)	July 31, 2018	#TSDBuhayNaPagasa	6.3%	#1		
Average				6.3%			

=== August 2018 ===
Episode		Original air date	Social media hashtag	AGB Nielsen NUTAM People in Television Homes			Ref.
Episode		Original air date	Social media hashtag	Rating	Timeslot rank	Whole day rank	Ref.
121	"Lumiliit na Mundo" (Small World)	August 1, 2018	#TSDLumiliitNaMundo	5.9%	#1		
122	"Fired"	August 2, 2018	#TSDFired	5.9%	#1		
123	"Decoy"	August 3, 2018	#TSDDecoy	6.4%	#1		
124	"Pasabog" (Petard)	August 6, 2018	#TSDPasabog	5.9%	#1		
125	"Lagablab" (Fiery)	August 7, 2018	#TSDLagablab	6.2%	#1		
126	"Huli sa Akto" (Caught in the Act)	August 8, 2018	#TSDHuliSaAkto	6.5%	#1		
127	"Patibong" (Trap)	August 9, 2018	#TSDPatibong	7.1%	#1		
128	"Pagkikita" (Meeting)	August 10, 2018	#TSDPagkikita	6.4%	#1		
129	"Set Up"	August 13, 2018	#TSDSetUp	6.9%	#1		
130	"Fake News"	August 14, 2018	#TSDFakeNews	6.6%	#1		
131	"Laglag" (Fall)	August 15, 2018	#TSDLaglag	6.7%	#1		
132	"Magkamatayan" (Dying)	August 16, 2018	#TSDMagkamatayan	6.8%	#1		
133	"Saksak" (Stab)	August 17, 2018	#TSDSaksak	7.2%	#1		
134	"Pagtatakwil" (Repudiation)	August 20, 2018	#TSDPagtatakwil	6.9%	#1		
135	"Manigas Ka" (You Hardened)	August 21, 2018	#TSDManigasKa	7.8%	#1		
136	"No Entry"	August 22, 2018	#TSDNoEntry	6.1%	#1		
137	"Bugso" (Wave)	August 23, 2018	#TSDBugso	6.4%	#1		
138	"Modus"	August 24, 2018	#TSDModus	6.1%	#1		
139	"Karma"	August 27, 2018	#TSDKarma	7.1%	#1	#11	
140	"Pasaway" (Troublemaker)	August 28, 2018	#TSDPasaway	6.9%	#1	#9	
141	"Kuyog" (Horde)	August 29, 2018	#TSDKuyog	6.8%	#1	#11	
142	"Multo" (Ghost)	August 30, 2018	#TSDMulto	6.5%	#1	#13	
143	"Pakana" (Scheme)	August 31, 2018	#TSDPakana	7.5%	#1	#11	
Average				6.6%			

=== September 2018 ===
Episode		Original air date	Social media hashtag	AGB Nielsen NUTAM People in Television Homes			Ref.
Episode		Original air date	Social media hashtag	Rating	Timeslot rank	Whole day rank	Ref.
144	"Evil Plan"	September 3, 2018	#TSDEvilPlan	7.2%	#1	#11	
145	"Pagtugis" (Pursuit)	September 4, 2018	#TSDPagtugis	6.5%	#1	#13	
146	"Maling Biktima" (Wrong Victim)	September 5, 2018	#TSDMalingBiktima	6.1%	#1	#13	
147	"Agaw Buhay" (Dying)	September 6, 2018	#TSDAgawBuhay	6.2%	#1	#11	
148	"Pagpanaw" (Death)	September 7, 2018	#TSDPagpanaw	6.1%	#1	#12	
149	"Paghuli" (Capture)	September 10, 2018	#TSDPaghuli	5.1%	#2	#15	
150	"Paalam Muylabs" (Goodbye My Love)	September 11, 2018	#TSDPalamMuylabs	5.2%	#1	#17	
151	"Cause of Death"	September 12, 2018	#TSDCauseOfDeath	5.6%	#1	#11	
152	"Sagupaan" (Encounter)	September 13, 2018	#TSDSagupaan	6.3%	#1	#11	
153	"Paghabol" (Chasing)	September 14, 2018	#TSDPaghabol	7.6%	#1	#10	
154	"Traydor" (Traitor)	September 17, 2018	#TSDTraydor	7.4%	#1	#12	
155	"Itim" (Black)	September 18, 2018	#TSDItim	6.0%	#2	#15	
156	"Panganib sa Anak" (Daughter in Danger)	September 19, 2018	#TSDPanganibSaAnak	5.2%	#1	#14	
157	"Pagpapabagsak" (Falling)	September 20, 2018	#TSDPagpapabagsak	5.0%	#2		
158	"Duda" (Doubt)	September 21, 2018	#TSDDuda	4.9%	#2		
159	"Nalalapit na Wakas" (End is Near)	September 24, 2018	#TSDNalalapitNaWakas	4.8%	#1	#16	
160	"Resbak" (Fight Back)	September 25, 2018	#TSDResbak	4.7%	#2		
161	"Isa Laban sa Apat" (One Against Four)	September 26, 2018	#TSDIsaLabanSaApat	4.5%	#2		
162	"Trying Hard Copycat"	September 27, 2018	#TSDTryingHardCopycat	4.5%	#2		
163	"Giyera" (War)	September 28, 2018	#TSDGiyera	4.7%	#2	#17	
Average				5.6%			

=== October 2018 ===
Episode		Original air date	Social media hashtag	AGB Nielsen NUTAM People in Television Homes			Ref.
Episode		Original air date	Social media hashtag	Rating	Timeslot rank	Whole day rank	Ref.
164	"Engkwentro" (Encounter)	October 1, 2018	#TSDEngkwentro	4.0%	#2		
165	"Sinungaling" (Liar)	October 2, 2018	#TSDSinungaling	4.2%	#2		
166	"Positive"	October 3, 2018	#TSDPositive	4.6%	#1		
167	"Naudlot" (Delayed)	October 4, 2018	#TSDNaudlot	5.0%	#1		
168	"Paglaban" (Fighting)	October 5, 2018	#TSDPaglaban	4.1%	#2		
169	"Matinding Balakid" (Extreme Obstacle)	October 8, 2018	#TSDMatindingBalakid	4.3%	#2		
170	"Sanib Pwersa" (Join Forces)	October 9, 2018	#TSDSanibPwersa	4.6%	#2		
171	"Lason" (Poison)	October 10, 2018	#TSDLason	6.0%	#1		
172	"Tokhang"	October 11, 2018	#TSDTokhang	5.9%	#1		
173	"Bomba" (Bomb)	October 12, 2018	#TSDBomba	5.7%	#1		
174	"Huling 5 Araw" (Last 5 Days)	October 15, 2018	#TSDHuling5Araw	5.9%	#1		
175	"Pagpatay" (Killing)	October 16, 2018	#TSDPagpatay	6.4%	#1		
176	"Matinding Galit" (Intense Anger)	October 17, 2018	#TSDMatindingGalit	5.9%	#1		
177	"Pagtatapos" (The End)	October 18, 2018	#TSDPagtatapos	6.2%	#1		
178	"Final Showdown"	October 19, 2018	#TSDFinalShowdown	6.3%	#1		
Average				5.2%			
