= Wil Time Bigtime =

2010–13 Philippine television show

- Former Wil Time Bigtime title card (2011–2013)
- Also known as: Willing Willie (2010–2011); Wil Time Bigtime (2011–2013)
- Genre: Variety show, game show, comedy
- Created by: Willie Revillame
- Developed by: Willie Revillame
- Written by: Cecille Matutina
- Directed by: Jojo Jardeleza (2010–2011); John Paul Panizales (2011–2013)
- Presented by: Willie Revillame and others
- Theme music composer: Lito Camo
- Opening theme: "Willing Willie" (Oct 2010 to Apr 2011) "Wil Time Bigtime" (May to Aug 2011) "Tantaran (Chutchuruchuru)" (Oct 2010 to Aug 2011) "Kendeng-Kendeng" and "A Go-Go Dancing!" (Aug 2011 to Apr 2012) "Baile!" (Apr 2012 to Jan 2013)
- Country of origin: Philippines
- Original language: Filipino

Production
- Executive producers: Rackie Sevilla (2010–2011); Gary Tejada (2011–2012)
- Producer: Willie Revillame
- Production locations: TV5 Studio A (Novaliches, Quezon City, Metro Manila, Philippines)
- Camera setup: Multiple-camera setup
- Running time: 120 minutes (Weekdays 2010–2011 at 18:30 to 20:30 and 2012–2013 at 19:00 to 21:00); 150 minutes (Weekdays 2011–2012 18:30 to 21:00 and Saturdays at 17:00 to 19:30); 135 minutes (Weekdays 2011 at 18:45 to 21:00)
- Production companies: ABC Development Corporation; Wil Productions, Inc.

Original release
- Network: TV5
- Release: October 23, 2010 – January 5, 2013

Related
- Wowowee; Wowowillie; Wowowin; Wil To Win; Wilyonaryo

Wil Time Bigtime (formerly known as Willing Willie) is a Philippine television variety show broadcast by TV5. The show was hosted by Willie Revillame. It aired from October 23, 2010 to January 5, 2013, replacing 5 Max Movies and Oplan Zero Tambay and was replaced by Super Sine Prime and Aksyon Weekend. The show commemorated its first anniversary at the Araneta Coliseum on October 22, 2011.

The show ended its run on January 5, 2013, and Wowowillie, was launched as its replacement on January 26, 2013.

== Hosts ==
=== Main host ===
- Willie Revillame (2010–2013)

=== Co-hosts ===
- Mariel Rodriguez (2011–2013)
- Camille Villar (2012–2013)
- Lovely Abella (2011–2013)
- Grace Lee (2012–2013)
- Cindy Miranda (2012–2013)

=== Former co-hosts ===
- Mo Twister (2010–2011)
- Imee Hart (2011)
- Beybisaya (2011)
- Rufa Mi (2011)
- Shalani Soledad (2010–2012)
- Iwa Moto (2012)
- Sugar Mercado (2011–2012)
- Rufa Mae Quinto (2012)

=== Substitute host for Willie Revillame ===
- Rico J. Puno
- Arnell Ignacio
- Yul Servo

=== Featuring ===
- Anna Feliciano
- Owen Ercia
- Jeff Vasquez
- Bigtime Girls
- Iona
- Wil Time Bigtime Money Girl
  - Kim Domingo

== History ==
Willing Willie logo

First broadcast under the name Willing Willie, the show formed as a result of the cancellation of Wowowee and the transfer of Willie Revillame to TV5. Several personalities from Wowowee appearing on Willing Willie include DJ Coki Meneses (disc jockey), Owen Ercia (floor director), Anna Feliciano (choreographer), April "Congratulations" Gustillo, Lovely Abella, and some former ASF dancers who comprise the in-house WW.Girls.

The show premiered on October 23, 2010 at 5:00 p.m., with Willie Revillame as host and Mo Twister as co-host. It was earlier reported that Revillame was considering Sandra Seiffert and Venus Raj as co-hosts, but both declined the offer. Valenzuela City councilor Shalani Soledad accepted the job, appearing on the November 8, 2010, episode.

== Controversies ==
=== Dancer feuds ===
Two WW.Girl members, Aprilyn "Congratulations" Gustillo and Monique "Pa" Natada, were suspended for five days from the show in November 2010 because of a fight over lipstick. On January 12, 2011, the WW.Girls group was given a three-day suspension for fighting over each other in Twitter.

=== Copyright infringement allegations ===
On November 24, 2010, ABS-CBN Corporation filed a copyright infringement suit against Willie Revillame, Wil Productions, Inc. and TV5 for allegedly copying Wowowee in Willing Willie. However, hearings on the case, which were filed at the Makati Regional Trial Court Branch 66 under presiding judge Joselito C. Villarosa, was suspended after the Court of Appeals of the Philippines granted the request for a temporary restraining order (TRO) by TV5.

TV5 then filed a petition for certiorari, prohibition and writ of preliminary injunction before the Court of Appeals. ABS-CBN responded by filing a motion seeking to dismiss the petition of the former. On March 10, 2011, the Court of Appeals ruled in favor of TV5.

=== Child abuse controversy ===
On March 12, 2011, Willing Willie featured a segment in which a 6-year-old boy performed a 'macho dance' to the tune of Dr. Dre's "The Next Episode" as his talent. Initially, the incident came and went without much clamor. However, it was not until a clip of the show was posted on YouTube that it began eliciting an online furor.

The episode shows a boy being summoned to the center stage along with another contestant. Shortly, Revillame summons a tall man, who stands next to the boy. The tall man never says anything. Revillame then asks the boy to greet his family, which the boy said that his dad works as a barber in a parlor shop, and acknowledges his mother's birthday. The boy is accompanied by his aunt to the show. After asking some questions about the boy's talent, Revillame then proceeds the boy to showcase his talent—macho dancing to the tune of "The Next Episode". During the performance, the boy cries in tears but nonetheless, it makes the audience laugh and Revillame remarks, "Umiiyak pa 'yan" (transl. "He's still crying!"). His aunt, nevertheless, is shown to be supporting the boy.

After returning from the stage, Revillame orders the sound director to play the music again so he can mimic the boy's movements. The boy complies. After Revillame stops the music, he gives the boy ₱10,000 cash, but the boy remains sad. When he asks the boy who taught him this talent, the boy replies that it was his father and uncle. Revillame even compares the boy's talent to the 1977 film Burlesk Queen, starring Vilma Santos. The music resumes several times, causing the boy to repeat the dance for the rest of the show, even during the question-and-answer segment. In the end, the host introduces the boy for one final act, this time performing atop a platform while surrounded by women, who appear to adore him, before Revillame announces the commercial break.

On March 25, Benjamin Pimentel of the Philippine Daily Inquirer wrote, "We have a big problem if it's OK for most people to let a big shot TV host treat a child like garbage." This was followed by the Department of Social Welfare and Development releasing a statement three days later asserting that this was a clear case of child abuse. In a press statement, the DSWD condemned "the emotional abuse and humiliation bestowed on a six-year-old child contestant." The Commission on Human Rights (CHR) is currently pursuing an investigation of the program for violating Section 10 of Republic Act No. 7610, or the Special Protection of Children Against Abuse, Exploitation, and Discrimination Act.

The Movie and Television Review and Classification Board (MTRCB) was also conducting hearings on the issue. On April 8, three members of the MTRCB panel recused themselves from the case. The decision of the MTRCB was expected by the end of May.

The issue received condemnation from the Catholic Bishops Conference of the Philippines, showbiz personalities like Jim Paredes, Bianca Gonzalez, Lea Salonga, Aiza Seguerra, Leah Navarro (of the Black and White Movement), K Brosas, Agot Isidro, Mylene Dizon (from the rival program Mara Clara), and Tuesday Vargas, through the social networking site Twitter. Columnists from the Philippine Daily Inquirer, such as Randy David, Rina Jimenez-David, Michael Tan, and Benjamin Pimentel, as well as militant organizations like GABRIELA, also expressed their disapproval.

Mang Inasal, Procter & Gamble, CDO, Cebuana Lhuillier, NutriAsia, and Unilever pulled their advertisements from the show in the first week of April after pressure resulting from this controversy.

As a result, Revillame announced that the show would be on hiatus starting April 11. He warned that charges would be filed against those who attacked him on Twitter. He questioned why only Willing Willie was singled out, while other shows such as Showtime and Goin' Bulilit were not.

On April 18, 2011, Revillame stated that he would no longer file charges against the celebrities who attacked him on Twitter.

On April 25, 2011, the End Child Prostitution, Child Pornography and Trafficking of Children for Sexual Purposes (ECPAT) filed a child abuse case against Revillame, TV5, and its officials, including chairman Manuel V. Pangilinan. The DSWD filed a similar suit two days later.

The show did not resume on April 25, pending a go-signal from TV5. On April 27, the Philippine Entertainment Portal reported that the show would resume on May 7 with a new format.

On May 3, 2011, the MTRCB issued a month-long suspension for the show and placed it under probationary status, meaning that the show needs daily permits from the MTRCB before airing once the suspension is lifted. The days that had passed since the show voluntarily went off the air on April 8 were counted.

=== Poverty perpetuation ===
In the process of deliberating the sanctions against Willing Willie, the MTRCB, stated that it was heeding the call for sweeping reforms of the television industry. They also brought up the matter of whether the show, and others like it on Filipino television, attract their audience by offering 'quick fixes' to the audience members' poverty in the form of prize money.

In the decision of the board in which it suspended the Willing Willie show, it stated:

The MTRCB as a government regulatory agency, and as a stakeholder in the television industry, realize the value of setting a good example to the viewing public in general, who are composed of all gender[s] and of all ages, and especially to children. We should always promote the good, and not condone what is reckless. There is a very thin line between exposition and exploitation.

When an uneducated impoverished man is in front of us, we are confronted with the question: "What should we do?" To teach by setting a good example, and not take advantage of his state, and never allow him to wallow in his miseries.

A quick fix does not solve anything permanent. The state of the Philippine television industry is a product of a long process of compromises, and quick-fixes. These quick fixes may be likened to drugs that are so addicting we end up being trapped in its unending cycles of perpetuating poverty, and uneven power relations.

There is a saying that goes: "Give a man a fish and you feed him for a day. Teach a man to fish and you feed him for a lifetime." False hopes can never be a solution.

=== Wil Time Bigtime ===
On May 9, 2011, Cristy Fermin reported on Juicy! Express that the primetime variety-game show will change to Wil Time Bigtime, on May 14, 2011, occupying the same format and same timeslot.

== Segments ==
=== Elimination Games ===
==== 1-2-3 Go ====
More than 50 individuals from the studio audience has been already selected during the raffle draw and another 10 studio audiences from his/her group who danced the opening dance number has been selected on-air before playing the game but all of them received a gift pack from the sponsor. They will only choose the numbers 1, 2 or 3 to answer the questions. If the individual contestants selected the correct answer, they will proceed to the next questions but the other individual contestants who chose the 2 wrong answers are automatically eliminated from the game. The remaining individual contestant who chose the correct answer to the final question automatically receives PHP 10,000 cash prize before playing the Shoot Mo Baby! jackpot round. If all contestants chose the 2 wrong answers, there will be another raffle draw for a jackpot round. This was later replaced by Red White and Blue in May 14.

==== Red, White and Blue ====
The game is very similar to 123 Go! Except that they have to step on each color in the LCD stage. If they answer the questions correct they can proceed to the next question. This was later removed months later.

==== Family Apir! ====
Four teams consisting of four members each compete to win the top prize in a fun, action-filled balloon-popping game, a popular parlor game. Each team automatically receives P 5,000 then gets to present their cheer to the audience. Each team tries to pop eight balloons in the fastest time, running back and forth, landing on the other member's lap to pop the balloon. The fastest team moves on to the jackpot round but they will receive P 10,000 in cash for a total of P 15,000 cash prize, where they can win the jackpot prize if the team succeeds to pop eight balloons in only 15 seconds.

==== Wil Time Bigtime (Willie of Fortune)/Kantanong ====
6 people selected earlier through "themed" auditions compete in pairs in rounds of Willie of Fortune. The in-house keyboardist plays a portion of a song, and the first person to answer the artist/title of the song correctly wins one point. 2 points are required to win the first round to enter the knock out round. In this round, the 3 remaining players go to a knock out question. One song will be played, and whoever can buzz in the correct song title/artist first wins P 10,000 cash and gift pack from sponsor automatically enters the mega jackpot round.

=== Jackpot Games ===
==== As Willing Willie ====
===== Shoot Mo Baby! =====
A winner from 123 Go! plays this Jackpot Round. The player will have to shoot the rings on the cylindrical stick in order to received the following amount that will be given to the player. (For example: The player had a shot to the ₱10,000, receives the ₱10,000). This was sometime replaced by Baligtaran.

===== Wall of Fortune =====
The group that won in Family Apir plays in this round. One of the four members has to play in this round and pop the balloons on the wall in order to receive cash if the player pops three (3) balloons marked with ‘’’X’’’, the game stops. But if the player pops the balloon on the middle he/she will receive ₱100,000. This was replaced by Wil-i-Stick.

===== Spin A Wil =====
A contestant from Wil Time Bigtime who won at the knockout Kantanong round will play at this round. The player will have to spin the three wheels, first the wheel containing (₱3,000, ₱5,000, ₱10,000 or ₱15,000) then the second wheel containing (X2, X3 and X5). Then the third wheel containing the (‘’’W’’’) or Bokya which is the jackpot. The host will bet on the amount to the contestant saying (Uwi, Hindi) Uwi means go home with the betted Cash/Pera and Hindi means Stay for the wheel. If the contestant chose "Hindi" and the wheel was opened ‘’’W’’’, The contestant will receive a jackpot prize worth ₱1 Million, House and Lot and a Brand New Car. The game is somehow similar to Cash Bukas, the segment on the past game show.

==== As Wil Time Bigtime ====
===== Baligtaran (2011–2013) =====
The selected audience by drawlots (formerly the winner of Red, White and Blue) will have to proceed to this game. the contestant will have to put the ball on the betted line and push the button. And either the box will turn in to upside down in order to either play again or stop.

===== Wil-i-Stick (2011) =====
The group who won Family Apir will proceed to this game. Four of them will have to move the sticks outside and receive depends the amount of the color of the stick.

===== Step Yes, Step No (May–December 2011) =====
The winner for Wil Time Bigtime proceeds to this round. The player will have to either step on yes or no. After stepping on these following questions, The player will be asked to Step In or Step Out, once the player Stepped Out The player has to received the amount gave to him, but if he stepped in, the player has to step on either A, B, or C in order to win the jackpot. If the player answers correctly he/she wins the Jackpot and go home with ₱1,000,000, House and Lot and Brand New Car. But if the Jackpot was answered wrong, the amount of money reduces and the player has to go home with it. The game concept is somehow similar to Who Wants to be a Millionaire. This was sometime replaced by Pera's Wil in December 2011.

===== Pera's Wil (December 2011 – 2013) =====
The winner from Wil Time Bigtime will have to play in this segment. The player has to choose a color on the wheel. The wheel either contains (Mega Jackpot, 1 Million or Bokya). The player has to choose either Pera or Wil if the player chose pera, the betted money amount, the player will receive but if the player chose Wil, the player has to go home depends on the amount or what the wheel contains. The segment was later played in Wowowillie.

===== JackPOT sa Kaldero (2012) =====
10 pots, and 1 selected. The player either select 10 of the pots, The jackpot contains P75,000.

===== Patalbugan (2012) =====
The winner of Family Apir throws the ball on to the glass, the amount given depends on the balls thrown onto the glass.

=== Other segments ===
- InstaJam (every Saturdays)

== Accolades ==
- 2011 – PMPC Star Awards for TV – Best Variety Show (as Willing Willie)

== Studios ==
- TV5 Studio A, TV5 Broadcasting Center (2010–2013)
- Broadway Centrum (during special occasions)

== See also ==
- List of TV5 (Philippine TV network) original programming
