= Cindy Miranda =

Filipino actress (born 1990)

- Born: Joanna Cindy Veron Miranda; November 19, 1990 (age 35)
- Education: University of Santo Tomas
- Occupations: Beauty pageant titleholder; actress; host
- Height: 5 ft 7 in (1.70 m)
- Beauty pageant titleholder
- Agency: Viva Artists Agency
- Years active: 2011–present
- Major competitions: Miss Philippines Earth 2008 (Unplaced); Binibining Pilipinas 2013 (Winner – Binibining Pilipinas Tourism 2013) (Binibining Petron) (Cream Silk Beyond Beautiful Woman Award); Miss Tourism Queen International 2013 (Top 10)

Joanna Cindy Veron Miranda (born November 19, 1990) is a Filipino actress and beauty pageant titleholder who was crowned Binibining Pilipinas Tourism 2013 at the Binibining Pilipinas 2013.

== Early life ==
She was born to Ana and Tony Miranda. She has four siblings. Miranda finished her Tourism course in University of Santo Tomas in 2011 with cum laude honors.

== Career ==
In 2011, she joined the cast of Pinoy Big Brother: Unlimited. She became co-host of variety-game show Wil Time Bigtime from 2012 to 2013 and Wil To Win in 2024.

== Pageantry ==
=== Binibining Pilipinas 2013 ===
Miranda competed for the Binibining Pilipinas 2013 wherein she won as Binibining Pilipinas Tourism 2013 and garnered the awards for Binibining Petron and Cream Silk Beyond Beautiful Woman Award.

=== Miss Tourism Queen International 2013 ===
She represented the Philippines at the Miss Tourism Queen International 2013 pageant in Xianning, China on October 3, 2013. At the end of the competition, she placed in the Top 10.

== Filmography ==
=== Film ===
Year	Title	Role	Ref.
2015	No Boyfriend Since Birth	Rachel	
2018	Ang Pambansang Third Wheel	Diane	
2019	Maria	Wednesday	
2019	Sanggano, Sanggago't Sanggwapo	Engr. June Olpindo	
2021	Nerisa	Nerisa	
2021	House Tour	Elle	
2021	My Husband, My Lover	Loida	
2022	Reroute	Trina	
2023	Martyr or Murderer	young Imelda Marcos	
2023	Penduko		
2024	Kuman Thong	Clara	
2024	40	Megan	

=== Television ===
Year	Title	Role	Ref.
2011–2012	Pinoy Big Brother: Unlimited	Housemate	
2012–2013	Wil Time Bigtime	Co-host	
2016	Ang Panday	Sylvia	
2017–2018	La Luna Sangre	Elise	
2017–2021, 2026–present	ASAP XP	Co-host / performer	
2019	Uncoupling	Elisse	
2021	Kagat ng Dilim	Clarissa	
2022	Iskandalo	Patricia Esguerra	
2023	Team A	Rochelle Martinez	
2023	Minsan pa Nating Hagkan ang Nakaraan	Victoria Merrit	
2024	Wil To Win	Co-host	
2025–2026	Totoy Bato	Amber Castillo	
