= The Stepdaughters =

2018 Philippine television drama series

- Title card
- Genre: Drama
- Created by: Angeli "Geng" Delgado
- Written by: J-mee Katanyag; Kuts Enriquez; Wiro Ladera; Evie Macapugay; Nehem Dallego
- Directed by: Paul Sta. Ana; Jules Katanyag
- Creative director: Roy Iglesias
- Starring: Megan Young; Katrina Halili
- Theme music composer: Anne Figueroa
- Opening theme: "Bahagi Ko ng Langit" by Aicelle Santos
- Country of origin: Philippines
- Original language: Tagalog
- No. of episodes: 178 (list of episodes)

Production
- Executive producers: Maria Luisa M. Cadag; Reylie Manalo; Lani Feliciano-Sandoval
- Editors: Paolo Mendoza; Julius James Castillo; Jesus Tana; Arturo Damaso; Sony Custado
- Camera setup: Multiple-camera setup
- Running time: 20–35 minutes
- Production company: GMA Entertainment Content Group

Original release
- Network: GMA Network
- Release: February 12 – October 19, 2018

The Stepdaughters is a 2018 Philippine television drama series broadcast by GMA Network. Directed by Paul Sta. Ana, it stars Megan Young and Katrina Halili both in the title roles. It premiered on February 12, 2018 on the network's Afternoon Prime line up. The series concluded on October 19, 2018, with a total of 178 episodes.

The series is streaming online on YouTube.

== Premise ==
A story of two women, Mayumi and Isabelle who dislike each other. They will eventually become stepsisters when Mayumi's mother marries Isabelle's father.

== Cast and characters ==
Cast

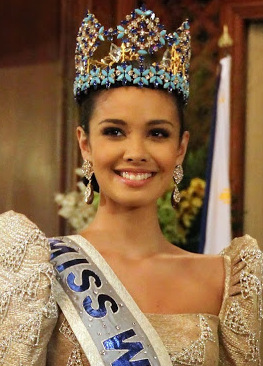
Megan Young

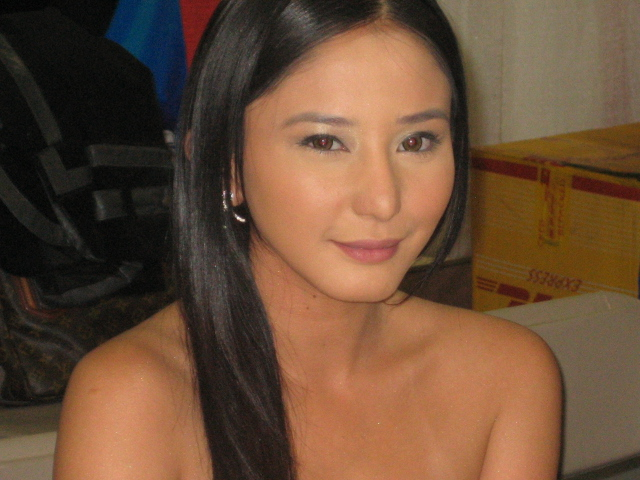
Katrina Halili

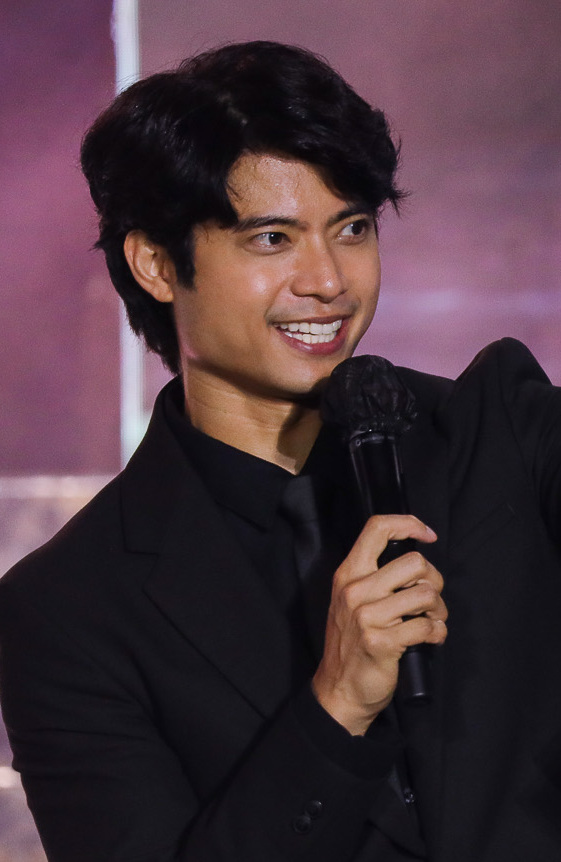
Mikael Daez

Lead cast

- Megan Young as Mayumi Dela Rosa-Almeda
- Katrina Halili as Isabelle "Belle" Salvador

Supporting cast

- Mikael Daez as Francisco "Francis" Almeda
- Glydel Mercado as Luisa "Loreng" Manor-Salvador
- Gary Estrada as Hernando "Hernan" Salvador
- Sef Cadayona as Bryce Morales
- Samantha Lopez as Daphne Salimbagon
- Edgar Allan Guzman as Froilan Almeda
- Madeleine Nicolas as Baby Samonte

Recurring cast

- Karenina Haniel as Sasha
- Emmanuelle Vera as Nikki
- Donita Nose as Ariana
- Lovely Abella as Mylene
- Nathan Lopez as Benson
- Valentin "Nani" Naguit as Caloy
- Kristoffer King as Jigs
- Zackie Rivera as Jenjen
- Chromewell Cosio as Joel
- Froilan Sales as Henry

Guest cast

- Angelu de Leon as Brenda Salvador
- Allan Paule as Mario Dela Rosa
- Irma Adlawan as Susanna Almeda
- Alicia Alonzo as Felicidad "Fely" Almeda
- Rissian Rein Adriano as younger Mayumi
- Alessandra Alonzo as younger Isabelle
- Shakira A. Ceasar as younger Sasha
- Zymic Jaranilla as younger Froilan
- Adrian Pascual as younger Francis
- Joyce Ching as Grace Dela Rosa
- Liezel Lopez as Marigold
- Tess Bomb as Tess
- Dea Formilleza as Lani
- Gerald Madrid as David
- Carlo Gonzales as Louie
- Orlando Sol as Emman
- Kevin Sagra as Kenji
- Marife Necesito as Diana
- Wilma Doesnt as Zoraya
- Sophie Albert as Lily
- Khaine Dela Cruz as Yuri Buenafe
- Carla Humphries as Ailene Buenafe

== Ratings ==
According to AGB Nielsen Philippines' Nationwide Urban Television Audience Measurement People in television homes, the pilot episode of The Stepdaughters earned a 6.5% rating. The final episode scored a 6.3% rating.

== Accolades ==
Accolades received by The Stepdaughters
Year	Award	Category	Recipient	Result	Ref.
2018	32nd PMPC Star Awards for Television	Best Daytime Drama Series	The Stepdaughters	Nominated	
2018	32nd PMPC Star Awards for Television	Best Drama Actress	Katrina Halili	Nominated	
2018	32nd PMPC Star Awards for Television	Best Drama Supporting Actor	Gary Estrada	Nominated	
2018	32nd PMPC Star Awards for Television	Best Child Performer	Zachie Rivera	Nominated	
