= Hello Pappy scandal =

2007 Philippines game show controversy

Hello Pappy Scandal
- Wowowee host Willie Revillame reveals the two films inside the Violet wheel.
- Date: August 20, 2007
- Cause: Revillame opened the Violet wheel and it was revealed zero on the film, Revillame held in his right hand with the two films.
- Participants: Willie Revillame; ABS-CBN Corporation; Department of Trade and Industry (DTI)
- Outcome: The Department of Trade and Industry has fined ABS-CBN of ₱290,000 for violating Consumers Act.

The Hello Pappy scandal was a scandal surrounding an incident during the August 20, 2007 episode of the Filipino variety show Wowowee, broadcast by ABS-CBN. The name of the scandal, coined by Joey de Leon, alludes to the nickname of Wowowee host Willie Revillame, "Pappy", and the Hello Garci scandal.

During the episode, a technical error occurred during the final jackpot round of the show's "Wilyonaryo" segment which raised allegations within the media that the segment was rigged by the producers. The incident prompted an investigation by the Department of Trade and Industry (DTI), and was also the catalyst of an on-air feud between Revillame and Joey de Leon, who was a personality from ABS-CBN's rival network GMA.

ABS-CBN claimed that the incident was the result of a "design flaw" that had been fixed. The network was fined ₱290,000 by the DTI for violating the Consumers Act.

== Development ==
During the August 20, 2007, episode of the ABS-CBN program Wowowee, a contestant named Weng participated in the "Wilyonaryo" segment of the show. In the earlier rounds, she had won ₱37,000. For the jackpot portion of the game, out of the twelve "wheels" used in the game, she was randomly given a white-colored wheel. Weng now had to choose between two big prizes: the ₱100,000 that Wowowee host Willie Revillame was offering her, or whatever was inside the white wheel, which, according to the rules, could be a jackpot prize of ₱2,000,000 (US$45,000), a jackpot prize of ₱1,000,000 (US$22,500), a jackpot prize of ₱500,000 (US$11,250), a house and lot, or nothing at all (which would be signified by the numeral zero).

At first, Weng decided to go with what was inside the white wheel. However, after being prodded by the hosts to take the money instead, she decided to forgo the possible jackpot prize revealed in the white wheel and instead take home the ₱100,000 for this round, plus the ₱37,000 from an earlier round. After this, Revillame pulled a dark film from the window embedded in the wheel to reveal what prize the contestant had lost by choosing to take home the ₱137,000. Pulling the dark film revealed the numeral zero. This meant that if she had chosen the white wheel instead, she would have gone home with only ₱37,000.

After the decision, Revillame went on to reveal where the other prizes—the ₱2,000,000 cash prize, the ₱1,000,000 cash prize, the ₱500,000 cash prize, and the house and lot—were hidden. He said that the symbol for the ₱2,000,000 cash prize—the numeral "2"—was in the window of the violet wheel. Revillame was handed the violet wheel and he reached behind it, supposedly to pull the dark film in order to reveal the numeral "2." However, when he pulled the film, the numeral "0" appeared instead. Revillame appeared to fiddle with the back of the wheel and then he pulled out two films: one dark film (supposedly the "cover" film) and another film bearing the numeral "2". As he held those two films in his hand, the numeral "0" was still visible in the window of the violet wheel.

Although ABS-CBN officials stated that this occurrence with the then-new game was a "mechanical glitch" and an honest mistake, controversy erupted as many critics asked whether the mistake was a sign that the show—or at least this portion of the show—could be or was rigged.

== Reactions and criticisms ==
The scandal grew after Joey de Leon, one of the hosts of Eat Bulaga!—a rival variety show broadcast by GMA Network—began making comments about the incident, ending an edition of his Manila Bulletin entertainment column with the statement, "Teasing is not bad. Cheating is ... on TV."

On the August 29, 2007, episode of Wowowee, Revillame addressed de Leon and insisted that he had not been cheating. Without mentioning Revillame or Wowowee by name, de Leon rebutted Revillame's statement the following day in a fifteen-minute-long monologue on Eat Bulaga!, advising him to "explain before you complain." He also accused Revillame of resorting to personal attacks in order to dodge questions about the incident. De Leon clarified that he was not directly accusing Willie or the Wowowee staff of cheating; noting that the only information he got about the incident was through video postings on YouTube and text messages he had received about the incident.

On August 30, 2007, Senator Mar Roxas, chair of the Senate's trade and commerce committee, announced that he would propose an inquiry into the alleged game rigging after getting information from the Department of Trade and Industry (DTI) and concerned parties. De Leon had jokingly called upon lawmakers to stop probing the Hello Garci scandal, and to start probing the "Hello Pappy" scandal during his speech the previous day. The "Wilyonaryo" game was also later discontinued from Wowowee.

The Movie and Television Review and Classification Board became increasingly concerned about the scandal due to the escalating on-air feuds between Revillame and de Leon—asking Revillame to make an on-air apology about his remarks towards de Leon on the September 4 episode of Wowowee.

=== Explanation by ABS-CBN ===
In response to the incident, ABS-CBN Vice President Bong Osorio stated that a rectified "design flaw" was the cause of the incident, further remarking that "[we] have no intention to manipulate results, but rather to add excitement and suspense." Osorio also stated that a game show can experience "glitches" during development, and re-enforced that all game shows broadcast by the network were operated in accordance with ABS-CBN's corporate values of honesty and integrity.

=== DTI probe, administrative fine and appeal ===
On October 13, 2008, the DTI ordered ABS-CBN to pay an administrative fine of ₱290,000, ruling that the "Wilyonaryo" segment violated the Consumers Act of the Philippines, ruling that, “A reasonable assessment of the existing game mechanics and procedures reveals that the game show segment allowed for reasonable likelihood of error and provided the host and organizers significant latitude in controlling the outcome of the contest.” ABS-CBN later released a statement that they would file an appeal on the decision.

== See also ==
- 1950s quiz show scandals, Match-fixing scandals involving quiz shows in the United States
- PhilSports Stadium stampede, a previous incident caused by an episode of Wowowee
