= SST: Salo-Salo Together =

Philippine television variety show

- Title card
- Genre: Variety show
- Country of origin: Philippines
- Original language: Tagalog
- No. of episodes: 684

Production
- Producer: Wilma Galvante
- Production locations: Broadway Centrum, Quezon City, Philippines (March 20, 1993 – January 27, 1995); GMA Network Center, Quezon City, Philippines (January 30, 1995 – June 30, 1995)
- Camera setup: Multiple-camera setup
- Running time: 90–150 minutes
- Production company: GMA Entertainment TV

Original release
- Network: GMA Rainbow Satellite
- Release: March 20, 1993 – June 30, 1995

SST: Salo-Salo Together (transl. SST: banquet together) is a Philippine television variety show broadcast by GMA Rainbow Satellite. It premiered on March 20, 1993. The show concluded on June 30, 1995, with a total of 684 episodes.

== Hosts ==
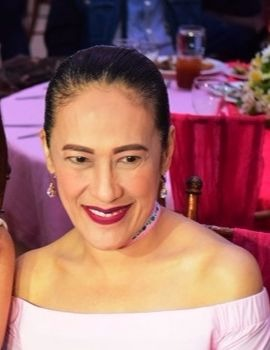
Ai-Ai delas Alas served as a host.

- Randy Santiago (1993–95)
- Dennis Padilla (1993–95)
- Smokey Manaloto (1993–95)
- Liezl Martinez (1993–95)
- Anjanette Abayari (1993–95)
- Joy Ortega (1993–94)
- Giselle Sanchez (1993–94)
- Dale Villar (1993–95)
- Ai-Ai delas Alas (1994–95)
- Bayani Agbayani (1994–95)
- Bernadette Allyson (1994–95)
- Giovanni Calvo (1995)
