= Lunch Date =

Philippine television variety show

- Title card from 1989 to 1993
- Genre: Variety show
- Opening theme: Lunch Date theme song: English (1986–89); Tagalog (1989–93)
- Country of origin: Philippines
- Original language: Tagalog

Production
- Production locations: Studio A, GMA Building, Quezon City, Philippines (1986–87); GMA Broadway Centrum, Quezon City, Philippines (1987–93)
- Camera setup: Multiple-camera setup
- Production company: GMA Entertainment TV

Original release
- Network: GMA Network
- Release: June 9, 1986 – March 19, 1993

Lunch Date is a Philippine television variety show broadcast by GMA Network. Originally hosted by Orly Mercado, Rico J. Puno, Chiqui Hollmann and Toni Rose Gayda, it premiered on June 9, 1986. The show concluded on March 19, 1993.

== Overview ==
Lunch Date started airing on June 9, 1986 replacing Student Canteen, with Orly Mercado, Rico J. Puno, Toni Rose Gayda and Chiqui Hollmann serving as the hosts. The show originally aired from Studio A of the old GMA building in EDSA, then moved to the GMA Broadway Centrum in 1987, the first of GMA's programs to do so.

When the show was reformatted after a year, it retained both Gayda and Hollman and added Randy Santiago, Keno, Lito Pimentel, Tina Revilla, Louie Heredia, Jon Santos, Dennis Padilla, Manilyn Reynes, Willie Revillame and Ai-Ai delas Alas to the show.

== Cast ==
Cast

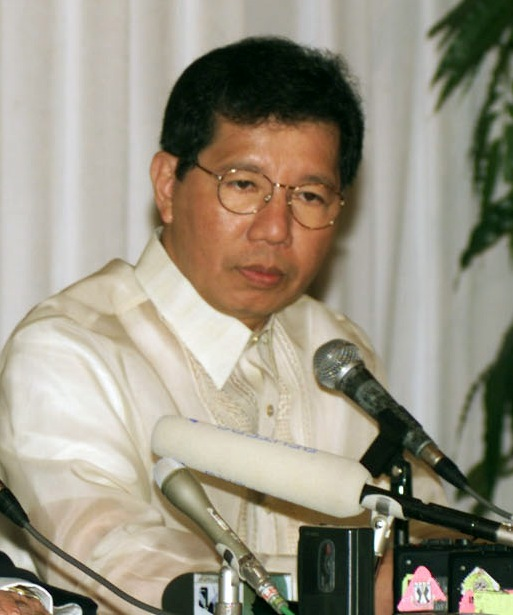
Orly Mercado

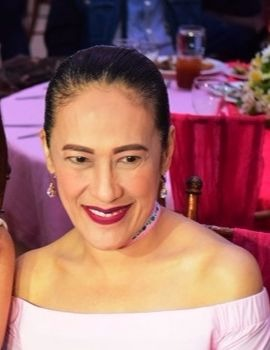
Ai-Ai delas Alas

- Orly Mercado (1986–87)
- Rico J. Puno (1986–87)
- Chiqui Hollmann (1986–88)
- Toni Rose Gayda (1986–93)
- Randy Santiago (1987–93)
- Keno (1987–88)
- Willie Revillame (1987–88)
- Lito Pimentel (1988–93)
- Tina Revilla (1988–93)
- Louie Heredia (1991–93)
- Manilyn Reynes (1991–93)
- Jon Santos (1991–93)
- Dennis Padilla (1991–93)
- Ai-Ai delas Alas (1991–93)
- Jenine Desiderio (1991–93)
- Rustom Padilla (now known as BB Gandanghari) (Monday)
- Isabel Granada (Tuesday)
- Gino Padilla (Wednesday)
- Samantha Chavez (Thursday)
- Ogie Alcasid (Friday)
- Geneva Cruz (Saturday)
- Vernie Varga
- Mahal
- Bayani Agbayani

Guest hosts

- German Moreno
- Ike Lozada

== Accolades ==
Accolades received by Lunch Date
Year	Award	Category	Recipient	Result	Ref.
1988	2nd PMPC Star Awards for Television	Best Variety Show	Lunch Date	Nominated	
1988	2nd PMPC Star Awards for Television	Best Male TV Host	Randy Santiago	Nominated	
1989	3rd PMPC Star Awards for Television	Best Female TV Host	Tina Revilla	Won	
1991	5th PMPC Star Awards for Television	Best Variety Show	Lunch Date	Nominated	
1991	5th PMPC Star Awards for Television	Best Female TV Host	Tina Revilla	Won	
1991	5th PMPC Star Awards for Television	Best Male TV Host	Randy Santiago	Nominated	
1992	6th PMPC Star Awards for Television	Best New Male TV Personality	Rustom Padilla	Won	
