= Willie Revillame =

Filipino actor, singer, host, and businessman (born 1961)

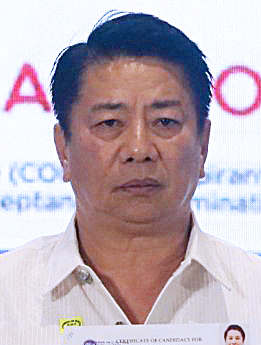
- Revillame in 2024
- Born: Wilfredo Buendia Revillame; January 27, 1961 (age 65); Cabanatuan, Nueva Ecija, Philippines
- Other names: Wil; Kuya Wil; Papi
- Occupations: Host; actor; comedian; singer; businessman
- Years active: 1987–present
- Agent(s): ABS-CBN (1998–2010); GMA Network (1987–98, 2015–22, 2026–present); TV5 (2010–13, 2024–26); ALLTV (2022–23); RPTV (2025); WilTV (2025–26)
- Political party: Independent
- Spouses: Princess Punzalan (m. 1990; ann. 1997) Liz Almoro (m. 2005; ann. 2008)
- Children: 4, including Meryll Soriano
- Musical career
- Genres: P-pop; novelty
- Instruments: Vocals; drums
- Labels: PolyEast Records (2001–03); Universal Records (2004–05); Star Music (2005–10); Viva Records (2010–13); MCA Music (Philippines) (2012–13); GMA Music (2015–22, 2026–present)

YouTube information
- Channel: Wowowin
- Years active: 2018–present
- Genre: TV show
- Subscribers: 8.03 million
- Views: 1.1 billion
- Last updated: April 29, 2026

Wilfredo Buendia Revillame (Tagalog: [wɪlˌpɾɛː.do bwɛnˌdiː.ɐ ɾɛˌbiːl.jɐˈmɛ]; born January 27, 1961) is a Filipino television host, actor, and businessman. He has hosted numerous variety shows, such as Lunch Date, 'Sang Linggo nAPO Sila and MTB. (Note: Revillame hosted two iterations of MTB, beginning with Magandang Tanghali Bayan (1998–2001) until Masayang Tanghali Bayan (February–December 2003)) During his stint at ABS-CBN, Revillame hosted the variety show Wowowee (2005–2010), which gained immense popularity in the country while receiving controversy for a deadly stampede and a game show scandal. When he ended his contract with ABS-CBN during a legal dispute in 2010, Revillame continued to host similar programs on other networks, such as Willing Willie or Wil Time Bigtime (2010–2013), (Note: Wil Time Bigtime was originally titled as Willing Willie from 2010 to 2011.) Wowowillie (2013), Wowowin (2015–2023; 2026–present), Wil To Win (2024–2025) and Wilyonaryo (2026). In 2022, Revillame assisted politician and businessman Manny Villar in establishing the television network ALLTV, to which he signed on as its first media personality.

Revillame is widely recognized for his charitable acts, often giving away his trademark jackets, stacks of cash, and other prizes to audience members, participants, and individuals in need through his television programs and outdoor events. Revillame unsuccessfully ran for senator as an independent in the 2025 election.

== Early life ==
Wilfredo Buendia Revillame was born on January 27, 1961, in Cabanatuan, Nueva Ecija to Myrna Buendia, who was never able to marry his father before his death in the 1980s; his siblings numbered up to six on his mother's side and eight on his father's side. Revillame was relocated to Angeles City, Pampanga and Caloocan in Metro Manila soon after, being cared for by different relatives during his childhood. He took on various odd jobs, such as street performing, selling newspapers, working as a passenger barker, and cleaning jeepneys.

== Entertainment career ==
=== Early years ===
Prior to hosting and acting, Revillame started his career as a drummer.

He made his television debut in GMA Network's noontime variety program Lunch Date, which ran from 1986 to 1993, as one of Randy Santiago's "hawi boys".

Revillame was also a film actor, with one of his earliest films being Bobo Cop by Regal Films in 1988. He appeared in various movies, often playing sidekick to big-named stars until he landed the titular leading role in Alyas Boy Tigas: Ang Probinsyanong Wais.

In 1998, Revillame moved to ABS-CBN, where he joined the noontime show 'Sang Linggo nAPO Sila. After its cancellation, he got his big break as one of the main hosts of Magandang Tanghali Bayan, alongside Santiago and John Estrada. He also appeared in the sitcom Richard Loves Lucy. Other shows he hosted within the network were public service program Willingly Yours, and the first season of reality show Pinoy Big Brother.

=== Wowowee ===
Revillame rose to prominence in 2005 as the sole male host of ABS-CBN's noontime variety game show Wowowee, where he began giving away jackets to contestants and audience members with his signature catchphrase, "Bigyan ng jacket 'yan!" (transl. "Give that a jacket!"), a tradition he carried over to his later shows.

Among the notable incidents during the airing of Wowowee was the PhilSports Stadium stampede and the Hello Pappy scandal. Prior to the supposed broadcast of the anniversary special on February 4, 2006, a crowd crush outside the PhilSports Arena occurred at 6:00 a.m., which killed 73 people and injured 400 others. Criminal charges against Revillame in connection to the event were dropped, but charges of other ABS-CBN officials were affirmed. In the August 20, 2007 episode, a technical error in the "Wilyonaryo" segment led to allegations of rigging by the show's producer and an on-air feud with fellow TV host Joey de Leon of Eat Bulaga!, the competing variety show of GMA Network.

On August 3, 2009, ABS-CBN decided to air a live coverage of former President Corazon Aquino's funeral procession alongside Wowowee. Revillame responded that he "could not make people happy while the entire country was mourning". This statement was interpreted as disrespectful to the deceased president and her family. Revillame said he intended no offense and that he had requested to have the supposed episode pre-recorded instead for airing on the next day to avoid clashing with the funeral coverage.

Wowowee ended airing on July 30, 2010, followed by Revillame's rescission of contract with ABS-CBN after relations with his employer deteriorated.

=== Wil Time Bigtime and Wowowillie ===
From 2010 to 2013, Revillame hosted TV5 variety programs such as Willing Willie, later renamed as Wil Time Bigtime in 2011, and Wowowillie in 2013. Following the latter's conclusion, he went into a hiatus to focus on business.

=== Wowowin ===
In November 2014, Revillame negotiated with the executives of his original home network, GMA for a television comeback by airing his variety game show Wowowin, with the help of former rival Joey de Leon, and broadcast journalist Mike Enriquez. He marked his homecoming by signing a contract with GMA Network on March 20, 2015, and Wowowin premiered on May 10. The show first aired in every Sunday afternoons and later shifted to weekdays on February 1, 2016, due to the huge popularity of the show. In 2020, GMA Network said that Wowowin Primetime was ready to Premiere on GMA, and the show premiered on February 15, 2020. It was replaced by The Boobay and Tekla Show in its timeslot.

On February 5, 2022, GMA Network announced that Revillame's contract will end on February 15, prompting his show to air its final broadcast in the network, four days prior. Out of "delicadeza", he did not renew his contract with GMA after taking the opportunity to work with Manny Villar on Advanced Media Broadcasting System (AMBS). Wowowin resumed through livestreaming on March 15 and later returned to airwaves via ALLTV on September 13, coinciding with the network's soft launch.

In 2023, Revillame reached an agreement with Villar to terminate his contract with AMBS, after his show stopped airing on ALLTV among others caused by lower ratings and lack of advertisers. Wowowin was supposed to resume in government-owned broadcast networks PTV and IBC, but plans were discontinued due to lack of budget, facilities and equipment.

=== Wil to Win ===
On April 26, 2024, Revillame returned to TV5 after 11 years and signed a partnership with MediaQuest Ventures. During a livestream on June 14, he announced his new show, titled Wil To Win, officially retiring the Wowowin name. The pilot episode aired on July 14 with a special event called the "Wil-Come Back Party", held at the New Frontier Theater, prior to regular programming the following day.

On February 10, 2025, Revillame left the show due to his senatorial candidacy, and he tapped director Randy Santiago as the substitute host. The variety show ended its run in April 2025.

=== Wilyonaryo ===
In July 2025, it was reported that Wilyonaryo will return and will start airing at TV5 and WilTV on January 25, 2026. A new studio for Wilyonaryo dubbed as "Studio W" at the TV5 Media Center in Mandaluyong was built for the game show. Construction began sometime after a memorandum of agreement was signed between Revillame, MediaQuest Holdings and Golden Pacific Holdings on February 10, 2025. Revillame is expected to return as host after he failed to get elected as senator in the May 2025 election.

== Political career ==
Revillame has repeatedly been urged by President Rodrigo Duterte to run for senator.

He was convinced to run for a political position in the 2010 national elections. Comedian Dolphy cautioned him against it stating politics is a "dirtier" field than show business. He advised the then Wowowee host to continue making "people happy" and "maybe, later on" consider entering politics. Revillame did not run.

=== 2022 election and Tutok to Win partylist ===
Revillame declined in October 2021 to run for the 2022 Senate election stating he would like to focus on his role as host of Wowowin. He expressed concerns about his inexperience in lawmaking since he is not a lawyer.

Revillame however did heavily promote the Tutok To Win Party-List of Sam Verzosa, who is also the founder of the multi-level marketing company Frontrow. The partylist which sought seats in the 2022 House of Representatives elections, shares the same name as the segment of his variety show Wowowin.

=== 2025 Senate election ===
Revillame expressed interest in running for the position of Senator in the 2025 Senate election as early as January 30, 2024, when he declared so during an anti-charter change rally of supporters of now former president Duterte. However, he rescinded the plan in July 2024 citing a three-year contract with TV5 barring him from being involved in politics.

Nevertheless, on October 8, 2024, Revillame filed his candidacy to run in the 2025 election. He was granted permission from MediaQuest chairman Manny V. Pangilinan and TV5. Addressing concerns on his inexperience in lawmaking, Revillame insisted that it is enough for one to have a "heart open to helping others". He admitted of not having a legislative platform. Despite topping in pre-election surveys, however, Revillame lost, placing 22nd in the official results.

== Business ventures ==
Revillame is known for developing the Wil Tower, a condominium building in front of ABS-CBN Broadcasting Center in Quezon City, with his business partner and former Senate President Manny Villar. It held its grand opening on September 15, 2013. Revillame is also a former owner of the restaurants W Bar and Wil Steak Town at Wil Events Place located near Wil Tower Mall and ABS-CBN along Sgt. Esguerra Avenue in South Triangle, Diliman, Quezon City. Wil Tower Mall was developed by the real estate firm Vista Land, but Revillame's holdings were later sold to Villar.

Revillame was interviewed for the April 2015 episode of Kapuso Mo, Jessica Soho at his own rest house in Tagaytay after the signing of contract with GMA Network. During the interview, broadcast journalist Jessica Soho said that Revillame was planning to build a 5-star resort-hotel located within the 5-hectare (12-acre) lot that he acquired from the Madrigal family. His own rest house is also located within the same lot.

Following the acquisition of Advanced Media Broadcasting System, which obtained the former main ABS-CBN's free-to-air terrestrial channel frequencies and all of the terrestrial stations by the Villar family, Revillame was brought in to serve as a consultant and talent for the company's newly established network, ALLTV, debunking the rumors about his alleged involvement as an investor in the company's broadcast ventures.

== Personal life ==
The city of Cabanatuan in Nueva Ecija is Revillame's hometown. Revillame was first married to actress Princess Punzalan. In March 2005, he married Liz Almoro in a civil ceremony at Lipa, Batangas, officiated by then-Mayor Vilma Santos. This was followed by a church wedding in June 2005. Their marriage was annulled in 2008.

Revillame has four children: actress Mary Rosalind "Meryll" Soriano (born 1982 to Maria Victoria Soriano), Louise Anne, Juan Emmanuel "Juamee" (born to Almoro), and Marimonte Shanelle (born to Sharon Viduya).

=== Health ===
In March 2022, Revillame underwent an executive health checkup, including a colonoscopy and endoscopy, which revealed polyps in his stomach and colon that were initially suspected to be cancerous. He later announced that test results showed he was cancer-negative and encouraged the public to undergo regular medical screenings.

== Controversies ==
=== On-screen behaviors ===
During the live airings of his shows on national television, Revillame has been noted for his numerous tirades and rants in front of the cameras, such as reprimanding his staff members and co-hosts. He also engages in feuds with his critics and competitors.

=== Legal troubles with ABS-CBN ===
On May 4, 2010, Revillame went into an on-air tirade in Wowowee, this time directing his anger at entertainment columnist and DZMM radio host Jobert Sucaldito. Revillame said he had enough of Sucaldito's alleged criticisms against the show having high-school contestants whose grades were below the passing mark (75%) for the Willie of Fortune segment and also ridiculing them on-screen. He threatened to resign from the show unless the ABS-CBN management dismissed Sucaldito, who described Revillame's rant as being "pikon" (Tagalog slang meaning 'short-tempered'). He went on an indefinite leave three weeks later after the network declined his resignation letter.

In a press conference on August 9, 2010, Revillame announced that he was ending his contract with ABS-CBN, even if it is supposed to expire in September 2011. He also accused ABS-CBN of violating several provisions in his contract. He narrated that his decision came out of meetings between ABS-CBN production head Linggit Tan and network president Charo Santos-Concio regarding a return to the show on July 31. However, on July 20, Tan said the management will replace Wowowee with a new show on July 31 and also offered him a one-hour weekly show. She added negative feedback still prevailed among network employees about him going to work again. Despite the move, the network stated that Revillame's Wowowee tirade only highlighted his arrogance and stressed that the contract is still in effect.

In response to Revillame's departure, ABS-CBN pursued legal action in September 2010 by filing a counterclaim in the Quezon City Regional Trial Court, seeking ₱486 million in damages for breach of contract. Later on November 24, the network also lodged a ₱127 million copyright infringement case against him, his company Wil Productions, Inc., and rival network TV5 in the Makati Regional Trial Court, alleging that Willing Willie is a "copycat" of Wowowee, despite the new show and segment titles.

=== Child abuse case ===
On March 12, 2011, a "macho dance" by an apparently unhappy six-year-old boy while the Dr. Dre song "The Next Episode" played on the background on Revillame's primetime show, Willing Willie resulted in criticism. The Philippine Department of Social Welfare and Development described it as a case of child abuse. Revillame "sincerely and deeply" apologized for the segment, "which viewers may have found offensive or in bad taste." The Commission on Human Rights pursued an investigation of the program for violating the law.

In October 2015, the Court of Appeals allowed the arrest and prosecution of Revillame over the case. Atty. Nards de Vera, lawyer of Revillame, clarified in a GMA News article that Revillame has already posted the bail for the two cases in September 2013, and does not need the warrant of arrest served against his client. On April 11, 2016, the 3rd division of the Court of Appeal (CA) had affirmed the Regional Trial Court Quezon City Judge Roberto Buenaventura's decision. The CA said that Judge Buenaventura hadn't committed no grave abuse of discretion. In the CA's Decision, written by Justice Maria Luisa Quijano-Padilla, on the arrest and to bring Revillame to trial, they said, "as there is probable cause for the petitioner's commission of a crime, his arrest and arraignment should now ensue so that this case may properly proceed to trial, where the merits of both parties' evidence and allegations may be weighed."

== Filmography ==
=== Film ===
Year	Title	Character/Role
1988	Bobo Cop	
1991	Joe Pring 2: Kidlat ng Maynila	Babyface
1991	Sagad Hanggang Buto	Totoy
1991	Barbi for President	Oca
1991	Contreras Gang	Bong
1991	Joey Boy Munti: 15 Anyos Ka sa Muntilupa	
1992	Sam & Miguel (Your Basura, No Problema)	Angelo
1992	Primitivo 'Ebok' Ala: Kalabang Mortal ni Baby Ama	Angel Ala
1992	Pat. Omar Abdullah: Pulis Probinsiya	Malik
1992	Totoy Guwapo: Alyas Kanto Boy	Totoy's sidekick
1992	Mukhang Bungo: Da Coconut Nut	Danding Mitra
1993	Masahol Pa sa Hayop	Lt. Benedicto Ledesma
1994	Nandito Ako	Punzalan
1994	Abrakadabra	Jojit
1994	Lagalag: The Eddie Fernandez Story	Berting Labra
1994	Ka Hector	Ka Andy
1995	Omar Abdullah: Pulis Probinsya 2, Tapusin Na Natin ang Laban	Malik
1995	Ikaw Pa Eh Love Kita!	Rene
1995	Sa Kamay ng Batas	Elvis
1996	Masamang Damo	Bentot
1996	Bilang Na ang Araw Mo	Dick
1996	Kung Kaya Mo, Kaya Ko Rin!	David
1997	Anak ni Boy Negro	Dodong
1997	Simaron, Barya Lang ang Halaga ng Ulo Mo!	Momoy
1997	Go Johnny Go	Teddyboy
1997	Bobby Barbers, Parak	Dalay
1997	Pusakal	Aga
1998	Kasangga Kahit Kailan	Muerte
1998	Alyas Boy Tigas: Ang Probinsyanong Wais	Boy Tigas
2000	Matalino Man ang Matsing Na-iisahan Din!	Mando
2000	Pera o Bayong (Not da TV)	Bartolome
2009	Nobody, Nobody But... Juan	Himself
2009	Engkwento	Game Show Host

=== Television ===
Year	Title	Role	Source
1987–93	Lunch Date	Himself (host)	
1987–89	Loveliness	Himself / Drummer	
1988	Ayos Lang Tsong!		
1988	Dance Tonight		
1989	Regal Family		
1989	Pabuenas sa Siyete		
1990	Barangay USA		
1991	Young Love, Sweet Love		
1991	Lovingly Yours, Helen		
1992	GMA Telesine Specials		
1993–94	Kate en Boogie		
1993	Love Notes		
1993	Four da Boys		
1994	Barangay U.S.: Unang Sigaw		
1994	Actually 'Yun Na!		
1994–95	Haybol Rambol		
1995	Tondominium		
1997	Gillage People		
1997–98	'Sang Linggo nAPo Sila	Himself (host)	
1998–2001	Richard Loves Lucy		
1998–2001; 2003	Magandang Tanghali Bayan / Masayang Tanghali Bayan	Himself (host)	
1998–2010	ASAP	Himself (guest)	
2002	Whattamen	Guest role	
2002	Morning Girls	Himself (guest)	
2002–03	Willingly Yours	Himself (host)	
2004	Puso o Pera	Himself (host)	
2004	Master Showman Presents	Himself (guest)	
2004	Extra Challenge	Himself (guest)	
2005–10	Wowowee	Himself (host)	
2005	Pinoy Big Brother	Himself (host)	
2005	Mga Anghel na Walang Langit	Himself (Wowowee host)	
2006	Ang Pagbabalik ng Bituin: A Mega Celebration	Himself (guest)	
2010	Melason	Himself (Wowowee host)	
2010; 2015; 2016	24 Oras	Himself (guest)	
2010–13	Willing Willie / Wil Time Bigtime	Himself (host)	
2010	Aksyon	Himself (guest)	
2011	Talentadong Pidol: Dolphy's 83rd Birthday Special	Himself	
2012; 2013; 2014	Startalk	Himself (guest)	
2013	Wowowillie	Himself (host)	
2015–23; 2027–present	Wowowin	Himself (host)	
2015	CelebriTV	Himself (guest)	
2016	Pepito Manaloto: Ang Tunay na Kuwento	Himself (Wowowin host)	
2016	Kapuso Mo, Jessica Soho	Himself (guest)	
2017	Wowowin Worldwide Tour 2017 「Abu Dhabi」Event	Himself (host)	
2018	Inday Will Always Love You	Himself (Wowowin host)	
2019	It's Showtime	Himself (guest)	
2021	6.6 Shopee Super Mega Fiesta	Himself (host)	
2021	Shopee 7.7 Mid-Year Sale TV Special	Himself (host)	
2021	Shopee 8.8 Mega Flash Sale TV Special	Himself (host)	
2021	Shopee 9.9 Super Shopping Day TV Special	Himself (host)	
2021	Shopee 11:11 Big Christmas Sale TV Special	Himself (host)	
2021	Shopee 12:12 Big Christmas Sale TV Special	Himself (host)	
2024–25	Frontline Pilipinas	Himself (guest)	
2024	The Long Take: One News Interviews	Himself (guest)	
2024	Seryosong Usapan: Revillame Faces the Journos	Himself	
2024–2025	Wil To Win	Himself (host)	
2024	The Big Story	Himself (guest)	
2025	WilTok	Himself (host)	
2026	Wilyonaryo	Himself (host)	

== Discography ==
=== Studio albums ===
Year	Title	Label	Source
2015	Nando'n Ako	GMA Records	
2013	Christmas Wish	MCA Music	
2012	Syempre	Viva Records	
2011	Kendeng Kendeng	Viva Records	
2011	Willing Willie	Viva Records	
2010	I Love You	Viva Records	
2009	Ikaw Na Nga	Star Records	
2008	Giling Giling	Star Records	
2007	Willie Sings... Camo & Saturno	Star Records	
2007	Dododo Dadada	Star Records	
2006	Namamasko Po!	Star Records	
2005	Wowowillie	Star Records	
2005	Para Sa'kin Ay Ikaw	Universal Records	
2004	Pito Pito	Universal Records	
2000	Parental Guidance?	OctoArts EMI Music	

=== Charted songs ===
List of singles as lead artist, showing year released, selected chart positions, and associated albums
Year	Title	Peak chart positions		Album	Ref
Year	Title	PHL	TPS	Album	Ref
2012	"Syempre"	24	19	Syempre	

== Ludography ==
=== Video games ===
Year	Title	Developer	Genre
2019–2022	Wil To Play	Big Crunch Digital Pte. Limited (Big Crunch Digital)	Mobile Game

== Awards ==
- Best Male TV Host (2005 and 2007) - Won
- Consumers Award Outstanding Variety Show (2008) - Won
- Consumers Award Outstanding Male TV Host (2008) - Won
- Novelty Singer of the Year (2010) - Won
- 2011 - PMPC Star Awards for TV - Best Variety Show (as Willing Willie)
- Celebrity Inductee, Eastwood City Walk Of Fame Philippines 2014- Won
- 2015 - PMPC Star Awards for TV - Best Game Show (Wowowin of GMA-7)
- 2015 - PMPC Star Awards for TV - Best Male Game Show Host
- 2016 - Inding-Indie Short Film Festival - Best Public Service TV Personality
- 2016 - Inding Indie Short Film Festival - Best Public Service TV Program of the Decade (Wowowin of GMA-7)
- 2016 - PMPC Star Awards for TV - Best Game Show (Wowowin of GMA-7)
- 2016 - Illumine Awards for Television (Global City Innovative College) - Most Innovative Game Show (Wowowin of GMA-7)
- 2017 - NwSSU Students Choice Awards for Radio and Television (Northwest Samar State University) - Best Game Show (Wowowin of GMA-7)

Year	Award-giving body	Category	Nominated work	Results
2008	Awit Awards	Best Novelty Recording	"Sayaw Darling"	Nominated
