= Wowowin =

Philippine television variety show

- Title card in 2023
- Genre: Variety show
- Created by: Willie Revillame
- Written by: Tata Betita; Cecille Matutina; Noel Balmaceda; Rod Divinagarcia
- Directed by: Randy Santiago; John Paul Panizales; Ernest John Eduard; Alberto Miguel; Gabriel Valenciano; Joel Angeles; Rod Divinagracia
- Creative director: Willie Revillame
- Presented by: Willie Revillame
- Opening theme: "Wowowin" and "Sige Sige Lang" by Willie Revillame
- Ending theme: "Wowowin" by Willie Revillame
- Country of origin: Philippines
- Original language: Tagalog

Production
- Executive producers: Elaine Ogtong; Ma. Luisa Cadag; Adrian Grent; Rose Conde; Angelito Dizon Ticsay
- Producer: Willie Revillame
- Production locations: Wowowin Studio, Quezon City, Philippines (2015–16); German Moreno Studio, GMA Network Studios Annex, Quezon City, Philippines (2016–22); Wil Tower Mall, Quezon City, Philippines (2020–23)
- Camera setup: Multiple-camera setup
- Running time: 60–90 minutes
- Production companies: WBR Entertainment Productions; GMA Entertainment Group (2016–22)

Original release
- Network: GMA Network (2015–22); All TV (2022–23)
- Release: May 10, 2015 – April 5, 2023

Wowowin is a Philippine television variety show broadcast by GMA Network and All TV. Hosted by Willie Revillame, it premiered on May 10, 2015 on GMA Network. The show aired its final broadcast on GMA Network on February 11, 2022. The show premiered on All TV on September 13, 2022. The show concluded on April 5, 2023.

== Overview ==
Originally produced by Willie Revillame's WBR Entertainment Productions Inc., it served as a blocktimer on GMA Network. Randy Santiago originally served as the show's director. The show's theme song was composed by Lito Camo and arranged by Albert Tamayo. On October 4, 2015, the show became a co-production between GMA Entertainment Group and WBR Entertainment Productions Inc. On February 1, 2016, the show joined the network's Telebabad line up.

In June 2017, co-host Super Tekla was fired from the show. On September 30, 2019, Sugar Mercado and comedian Donita Nose returned to the show.

The show's Saturday edition, Wowowin Primetime premiered on February 15, 2020, on the network's Sabado Star Power sa Gabi line up replacing Daddy's Gurl. Gab Valenciano, who was hired in January 2020 served as the director. In March 2020, the admission of a live audience in the studio and production were suspended due to the enhanced community quarantine in Luzon caused by the COVID-19 pandemic. The show resumed its programming on April 13, 2020.

The show ended its broadcast on GMA Network on February 11, 2022, as Revillame's contract with the network had expired in the same month. The show resumed original programming through livestreaming on YouTube and Facebook on March 15, 2022. On July 15, 2022, it was announced that the show would return to television on All TV, on September 13, after Revillame signed a contract with Advanced Media Broadcasting System. After its broadcast in All TV received low ratings, online livestreaming was ceased on September 26, 2022, to encourage the viewers to watch it on All TV. The show aired its final live broadcast on February 10, 2023 and concluded on All TV on April 5, 2023.

== Cast ==
- Willie Revillame (2015–23)
- Yvette Corral (2015–17)
- Janelle "Kim Chi" Tee (2015–17)
- Donita Nose (2015–17; 2019)
- Jennifer "DJ JL" Lee (2016–17)
- Super Tekla (2016–20)
- Amal Rosaroso (2017)
- Ashley Ortega (2017)
- Ariella Arida (2016–17)
- Sugar Mercado (2017–20)
- Camille Canlas (2017–18)
- Jannie Alipo-on (2017–18)
- Patricia Tumulak (2018)
- Nelda Ibe (2018)
- Kim Idol (2018)
- Petite (2018–19)
- Le Chazz (2018–19)
- Halimatu Yushawu (2018–19)
- Elaine Timbol (2019–20)
- Almira Teng (2019–20)
- Valerie Concepcion (2019)
- Boobsie Wonderland (2019–22)
- Herlene Budol (2019–22)

== Ratings ==
According to AGB Nielsen Philippines' Mega Manila household television ratings, the pilot episode of Wowowin earned a 22.1% rating. The premiere episode of Wowowin Primetime scored an 11.5% rating, according to AGB Nielsen Philippines' Nationwide Urban Television Audience Measurement People in television homes.

Based on Nielsen Philippines' National Urban TV Audience Measurement people data, the premiere of Wowowin on All TV scored a 0% rating.

== Accolades ==
Accolades received by Wowowin
Year	Award	Category	Recipient	Result	Ref.
2015	29th PMPC Star Awards for Television	Best Game Show	Wowowin	Won	
2015	29th PMPC Star Awards for Television	Best Game Show Host	Willie Revillame	Won	
2016	Illumine Awards for Television	Most Innovative Game Show	Wowowin	Won	
2016	Inding-Indie Short Film Festival	Best Public Service TV Personality	Willie Revillame	Won	
2016	Inding-Indie Short Film Festival	Best Public Service TV Program of the Decade	Wowowin	Won	
2016	30th PMPC Star Awards for Television	Best Game Show	Wowowin	Won	
2016	30th PMPC Star Awards for Television	Best Game Show Host	Willie Revillame	Nominated	
2017	8th Northwest Samar State University Students' Choice Awards for Radio and Television Awards	Best Game Show	Wowowin	Won	
2017	7th OFW Gawad Parangal	Best Game Show	Wowowin	Won	
2017	7th OFW Gawad Parangal	Best Game Show Host	Willie Revillame	Won	
2017	31st PMPC Star Awards for Television	Best Game Show	Wowowin	Won	
2017	31st PMPC Star Awards for Television	Best Game Show Host	Willie Revillame	Nominated	
2017	Students Choice Awards for Radio and Television	Best Game Show	Wowowin	Won	
2018	32nd PMPC Star Awards for Television	Best Game Show	Wowowin	Nominated	
2018	32nd PMPC Star Awards for Television	Best Game Show Host	Willie Revillame	Nominated	
2019	33rd PMPC Star Awards for Television	Best Game Show	Wowowin	Nominated	
2019	33rd PMPC Star Awards for Television	Best Game Show Host	Willie Revillame	Nominated	
2019	33rd PMPC Star Awards for Television	Best New Female Personality	Herlene Budol	Nominated	
2021	34th PMPC Star Awards for Television	Best Variety Show	Wowowin	Nominated	
2023	35th PMPC Star Awards for Television	Best Variety Show	Wowowin	Nominated	
2025	37th PMPC Star Awards for Television	Best Variety Show	Wowowin	Nominated	

== Controversies ==
In January 2019, one person from the audience died on the set of Wowowin, and one person was injured due to an accident. On July 24, 2019, host Willie Revillame disqualified a group of contestants for including an ineligible member.
