= No Place Like BKLYN =

Studio album by Jeannie Ortega
- Released: August 1, 2006
- Recorded: 2005–2006
- Genre: Pop; R&B; hip-hop
- Length: 42:08
- Label: Hollywood
- Producer: Alex Cantrall; Brian And Josh; Dr. Luke; Kovas; Kyze; Sluggo; Sol Survivor; Soulshock and Karlin; SPKilla; StarGate; The Arkitects

Jeannie Ortega chronology
No Place Like BKLYN (2006)	Perfect Love (2012)

Singles from No Place Like BKLYN
- 1. "It's R Time" Released: October 5, 2005; 2. "Crowded" Released: February 21, 2006; 3. "So Done" Released: 2006

Professional ratings
Review scores
Source	Rating
IGN	6.7/10
PopMatters	5/10
USA Today	2/4 stars

No Place Like Brooklyn (stylized as No Place Like BKLYN) is the debut studio album by American singer Jeannie Ortega. It was released on August 1, 2006 via Hollywood Records. Production was handled by Kovas, Brian And Josh, Alex Cantrall, Dave Katz, Dr. Luke, Kyze, Sol Survivor, Soulshock and Karlin, SPKilla, StarGate, and the Arkitects. It features guest appearances from Big Mato, Gemstar, Kovas, N.O.R.E., Papoose and Quan. In the United States, the album debuted at number 127 on the Billboard 200 and atop the Heatseekers Albums charts with first-week sales of 7,000 units. Its lead single, "It's R Time", was used in 2007 film Freedom Writers. The second single off of the album, "Crowded", which peaked at number 93 on the Billboard Hot 100 chart, was used in 2006 film Stick It and in an episode of soap opera One Life to Live. The song "So Done" was released as the third and final album's single. Ortega was eventually dropped by the label in 2007.

== Track listing ==
No.	Title	Writer(s)	Producer(s)	Length
1.	"Crowded" (featuring Papoose)	Jeannie Ortega; Shamele William Mackie; Mikkel Storleer Eriksen; Tor Erik Hermansen	StarGate	3:07
2.	"Pay It" (featuring Kovas)	Ortega; Kovasciar Myvette; James Roston; K. Childs	Kovas	3:23
3.	"Green I'z"	Ortega; Myvette	Kovas	3:25
4.	"Can U?" (featuring Quan)	Ortega; Clifford Peacock; David Anthony Katz; Łukasz Sebastian Gottwald; Derryl Howard; Alfred Wilson; Tommy Jarmon	Dave Katz; Dr. Luke; DJ Beatz (co.); Reace Beatz (co.)	3:18
5.	"So Done"	Ortega; Alex Cantrall; Carsten Schack; Kenneth Karlin; Damon Jared Reinagle	Alex Cantrall; Soulshock & Karlin	3:18
6.	"Let It Go"	Ortega; Brian Kierulf; Joshua Michael Schwartz	Brian And Josh	4:00
7.	"What I Need"	Ortega; Kierulf; Schwartz	Brian And Josh	3:37
8.	"It's R Time" (featuring N.O.R.E., Gemstar and Big Mato)	Ortega; Victor Santiago; Rolphy Ramirez; Leonardo Vasquez; Kevin Ravenell; Edwin Almonte	Kyze; SPK	5:00
9.	"Bling"	Ortega; Marshall Leathers; Sean Campbell; Roston	The Arkitects	2:59
10.	"Hear Me"	Ortega; Myvette; A. Simmons	Kovas	3:47
11.	"Don't Stop"	Ortega; Raymond Cham; Jay Williams; Lisa Simmons	Ray "Sol Survivor" Cham	6:14
Total length:				42:08

== Charts ==
Chart (2006)	Peak position
US Billboard 200	127
US Heatseekers Albums (Billboard)	1
