= You Didn't Expect That =

Single by Billy Crawford

from the album Ride
- Released: 2002 (Europe); 2003 (UK)
- Recorded: 2001
- Genre: 2-step garage
- Length: 3:01
- Label: V2
- Songwriters: A. Tennant; S. Robson; W. Hector
- Producers: Steve Robson; Wayne Hector

Billy Crawford singles chronology
| "When You Think About Me" (2002) | "You Didn't Expect That" (2002) | "Me passer de toi (Someone Like You)" (2003) |

Music video
- "You Didn't Expect That" on YouTube

"You Didn't Expect That" is a 2-step garage song recorded by Filipino-American singer Billy Crawford, taken from the album Ride. The song was a moderate success, reaching the top 40 in France, Belgium, Switzerland and the UK, peaking at numbers 6, 13, 23 and 35, respectively. The song is his second highest-charting single in the UK, after "Trackin'" which reached No. 32 on the UK Singles Chart.

== Track listing ==
UK CD maxi-single

1. "You Didn't Expect That" (Edit) – 3:01
2. "You Didn't Expect That" (Jaimeson Remix) – 6:03
3. "You Didn't Expect That" (Double R Remix) – 3:47
4. "You Didn't Expect That" (Almighty Remix) – 6:18
