= 1000 Heartbeats: Pintig Pinoy =

Filipino game show

- Title card
- Genre: Game show
- Created by: Paul Farrer
- Directed by: Bobet Vidanes
- Presented by: Xian Lim
- Starring: Chad Kinis; Ace of Strings; Maestro Andy
- Composer: Paul Farrer
- Country of origin: Philippines
- Original languages: Filipino, English
- No. of series: 1
- No. of episodes: 13

Production
- Executive producers: Vic Del Rosario Jr.; Robert Galang
- Running time: 60 minutes (inc. adverts)
- Production company: Viva Television

Original release
- Network: TV5
- Release: March 20 – June 12, 2021

1000 Heartbeats: Pintig Pinoy is a Philippine television game show broadcast by TV5. The show is based from the British television series 1000 Heartbeats. Hosted by Xian Lim, it aired on the network's TodoMax Weekend line up from March 20 to June 12, 2021, replacing Bangon Talentadong Pinoy and was replaced by Puto. The main goal of the game is to successfully complete seven rounds of various questions within the player's own 1,000 heartbeats to win ₱1,000,000.

== Production ==
The format was purchased by Viva Television in 2016 and was originally slated to premiere in July 2016 for sixty episodes. However, the show had to be shelved when their partnership with TV5 had to be temporarily cut and lack of a suitable host (and eventually when Chot Reyes became TV5 president and prioritized the then-ESPN5).

In March 2021, together with The Wall Philippines, 1000 Heartbeats: Pintig Pinoy was announced as one of the two newest game shows on TV5 produced by Viva Television. The show originally ordered 26 hour-long episodes, but was reduced to 13 episodes.

== Gameplay ==
The player wears an electronic heart rate counter where their heart rate in beats per minute (BPM) is displayed on the rightmost screen. The round begins once the player steps onto the "plate", a white circular platform that turns red upon stepping. From the initial total of 1,000 heartbeats, the heartbeats of the player are continuously deducted during the round, which is shown on the leftmost screen throughout the game. At any time the total number of heartbeats reaches zero, the game ends and the player leaves with nothing. During the game, the live string quartet plays the musical score of the show at a tempo based on the heart rate of the player.

The game consists of seven rounds with the following amounts.

Round	Amount
1	₱10,000
2	₱25,000
3	₱50,000
4	₱100,000
5	₱250,000
6	₱500,000
7	₱1,000,000

The player must give seven correct answers for the first round and one less for every succeeding round. Every incorrect answer deducts 25 heartbeats from the total. The player may opt to change the question by stepping off the plate and a penalty of 100 heartbeats. Any correct answers given prior to stepping off are counted toward the number required to complete the round once the game resumes.

At the start of each round, the player is shown an example of the game to be played. They may elect to cash out with the money banked to that point rather than continue playing. In order to win the money, they must complete the "Cashout" round.

== Games ==
Round 1 – Contrast

- The player is given the same pair of answer options for all questions throughout the entire round. They must answer seven questions correctly to bank ₱10,000.

Round 2 – Reorder

- The player is given a randomized list of six items for them to correctly reorder in a specified arrangement to bank ₱25,000.

Round 3 – Unscramble

- The player must correctly form five sets of scrambled letters into words based on a given general category to bank ₱50,000. The player may ask to reveal the more specific category as a clue for 25 heartbeats.

Round 4 – Identify

- The player is given eight possible answers. They must correctly identify the four answers that fit the given statement to bank ₱100,000. If not all four answers are correct, they are penalized 25 heartbeats, then it is revealed how many choices are correct. This continues until all four answers are given in an attempt. Stepping off the plate gives a brand new set of answers and question, but the number of choices required is reduced by the number of correct answers given in the previous question.

Round 5 – Keep Up

- The player is shown a number and a mathematical operation. The answer to that operation becomes the next number to a different mathematical operation. They must complete three sets of six mathematical operations to bank ₱250,000. Stepping off the plate forfeits all attempts of the player in the current set and must complete a new set to advance. Any sets completed prior to stepping off are already counted towards the required number of sets.

Round 6 – Decipher

- The player is given two lists of five statements each and must choose the only one that fits each given question to bank ₱500,000.

Round 7 – Recall

- The player is shown a string of 12 alphanumeric characters and must recite it in the exact order to bank ₱1,000,000. The sequence remains displayed until the player says "recall" to attempt reciting the string. Any mistake costs 25 heartbeats and the process repeats.

Cashout

The player must correctly answer five consecutive true-or-false questions to successfully cash out their banked money. Any incorrect answer deducts 25 heartbeats and the player must try again to create a chain of five correct answers. The player cannot step off the plate in this round.
