= Brooklyn High School =

Brooklyn High School may refer to:

- Brooklyn Center High School in Brooklyn Center, Minnesota.
- Brooklyn High School (Ohio) in Brooklyn, Ohio
- Brooklyn High School of the Arts in New York City
- Brooklyn Technical High School in Brooklyn, New York
