= 1 vs. 100 (Philippine game show) =

- Genre: Game show
- Based on: Eén tegen 100
- Written by: Cecille Matutina
- Directed by: Bobet Vidanes
- Presented by: Edu Manzano
- Country of origin: Philippines
- Original language: Filipino
- No. of seasons: 1
- No. of episodes: 34

Production
- Executive producer: Morly Stewart Nueva
- Running time: 60 minutes
- Production companies: ABS-CBN Studios; Endemol

Original release
- Network: ABS-CBN
- Release: August 25, 2007 – April 19, 2008

1 vs. 100 is a Philippine television game show broadcast by ABS-CBN. The show is based on the Dutch game show Eén tegen 100. Hosted by Edu Manzano, it aired on the network's Saturday evening line up from August 25, 2007 to April 19, 2008. A single player (The One) goes up against 100 other contestants (The Mob). The One gains money for each mob member eliminated, but if the One answers incorrectly at any point of the game, the game ends and he or she leaves with nothing. The grand prize of the show is ₱2,000,000.

== Gameplay ==
Question	Value
1	₱1,000
2	₱2,000
3	₱3,000
4	₱4,000
5	₱5,000
6	₱6,000
7	₱7,000
8	₱8,000
9	₱9,000
10	₱10,000
11+	₱20,000

The Philippine version is similar to the format used in the U.S. and Australia and the new European format used in Italy and France. Contestants are given multiple-choice questions with three possible answers. Either The One or the Mob (or its remaining members) can win the prize depending on whether The One can answer the questions correctly. After answering a question correctly, mob members who answered that question incorrectly are eliminated from the game leaving empty handed. Players add a specific amount to their bank for every member of the mob they eliminate on a particular question (See table, left). If after any correct answer the entire mob members has been eliminated, the contestant wins the top prize of ₱2,000,000.

Contestants have three forms of assistance, or "helps," available to use at any point during the game, and as in the US version, they are "Poll the Mob," "Ask the Mob," and "Trust the Mob":

- Alamin ang Sagot (Know the Answer): Also known as Poll the Mob, the contestant picks one of the three answers. The number of mob players who chose that answer is revealed. This is represented by a magnifying glass.
- Sagot ng Dalawa (Answer of Two): Also known as Ask the Mob, One mob member who answered correctly and one who answered incorrectly are chosen at random. Each explains his/her decision to the contestant. Mob members must tell the truth as to which answer they chose, but do not have to tell the truth as to why they chose that answer. This automatically eliminates one wrong answer, thus leaving contestants with a 50-50 chance of picking the right answer. If all mob members answer incorrectly, the solo player will be permitted to talk to one mob member and then will be informed that their answer is incorrect. If all mob members answer correctly, the solo player isn’t told that and is given the option to lock the answer in. This can also occur if all the mob members answer incorrectly, but choose the same incorrect answer. This is represented by a question mark.
- Sagot ng Nakararami (Answer of the Majority): Also known as Trust the Mob, although the contestant doesn't commit to choosing the answer chosen by the largest number of mob members. S/he can or cannot follow the majority decision, although the figure of the percentage in the Mob can greatly influence the One's answer. If there is a tie for two answers, the solo player has a choice to one of those two answers. This is represented by an arrow pointing right.

When the contestant has reduced the Mob to ten or fewer members, the next question is shown but not the answer choices. Equipped with this knowledge, the player then decides whether or not to continue playing. This method is called the Sneak Peek.

Contestants may use multiple helps on a single question, but may only use each help once during the game. It is possible that a mob member may be picked for both the Alamin ang Sagot and Sagot ng Dalawa, even on the same question.

After completing each round of questions, contestants can take their winnings and leave the game (while leaving helps unused, if applicable). Contestants must make that decision before seeing questions; once they see a question, they are committed to answering it; although if ten or fewer mob members remain, they can see the question (but not the answers) before deciding. When contestants quit and take their winnings, remaining mob members win nothing, but can compete in the next game.

When a contestant answers incorrectly, however, he/she leaves with nothing. The mob members who correctly answered that question will split the contestant's earnings and return to compete in the next game. If everyone gets a question wrong, no one wins any money. Theoretically, each mob member can take home a minimum of ₱10.10 assuming the contestant gets the 2nd question wrong, only 1 mob member was eliminated in the previous question and the rest of the mob remains intact.

Mob members who are left, whether the One incorrectly answers a question or takes home the money earned, are to be referred to by the host as "The Unbeatables". In the following game when they would appear, they wear orange and black T-shirts bearing the words "Unbeatable 1" (with the numerals being the one used in the logo) to distinguish them from the new mob members. The numerals change increasingly for those unbeatables who survive through multiple episodes.

=== Ten Picks ===
From the December 1 episode, a new rule is in place. It is called the Ten Picks. In the start of the game, the One chooses 10 Mob members in 60 seconds. But if the One doesn't complete his Ten Picks, the computer would randomly choose from the mob to complete the selection process. During the game, as long as any of the chosen ten is still in the game, the One must commit to the game itself. Once all of the One's chosen ten Mob members are eliminated, the One can then choose to take the money accumulated or continue on. This is to ensure that the One stays in the game for as long as possible and to guarantee for the mob to go home with the money unless the One finally earns the option of Money or Mob.

== Theme episodes ==
=== 1 vs. 100 Kids ===
This concept of having a "Little Mob" of 100 children was supposed to last for only a single episode. But it ran for seven weeks due to "insistent public demand" and possibly to compete against the GMA's Kakasa Ka Ba sa Grade 5?

On October 13, 2007, episode, the show featured a mob made up of one hundred children, including ten Goin' Bulilit kids, five spelling champions, ten elementary school students (among them a junior Game KNB winner), ten track and field athletes, ten boy scouts, ten girl scouts, six go-kart racers, five Math Olympians, eight Quiz Bee champions, five gifted children, ten figure skaters, and Ira Alexis Jimenez Aclan, an 11-year-old violin prodigy. They all went face-to-face with celebrity contestant Randy Santiago.

On October 20, 2007, episode, in another 1 vs. 100 Kids episode, celebrity contestant Reynold "Pooh" Garcia became the first winner of ₱2 million. The new "Little Mob" who faced Pooh had among them five sets of twins, six children of celebrities, ten students of the UP Integrated School, ten child rappers, a Rubik's Cube champion, five "Tiktik Kalawang Boys" (boys who tinker with metallic junk), and five children from the district of Quiapo.

On October 27, 2007, a third Kids episode aired, this time a Halloween-themed one. Two contestants played in the episode with two different Mobs. The one who faced celebrity contestant Long Mejia included amongst others six Super Inggo kids, ten students from Philippine Cultural High School (Main Campus), ten children of cemetery watchers, ten altar boys, six child actors who appeared in horror films, and ten members of a children's rondalla. The Mob who faced in Candy Pangilinan's game included six candidates of "Mr. and Miss United Nations", fifteen child boxers, ten debate team members, five valedictorian candidates, and six child commercial models, to name a few. Candy's game was carried over to the November 3 episode.

In the November 11 episode, Bayani Agbayani faced a Little Mob which included pet lovers, Muslim students and children with high IQ. Not long after his very short game, Toni Gonzaga faced a Mob which has choir boys, Wushu athletes, and a drum and bugle band.

On November 17, 2007, Anne Curtis faced a Little Mob which has students of different schools, boy scholars, a dance troupe, kid singers and a singing champion, and child painters.

On November 24, 2007, Chito Miranda of the band Parokya ni Edgar faced a new mob which included members of a children's choir, "children with excellence" and members of an Ati-atihan dance troupe. It would become the last Kids episode. In the very next week, the adult Mob returned, the reason given by Edu being the Little Mob going on a "recess" because of the giveaways each member of each Little Mob received.

In all Kids episodes, each Mob was completely different.

Pooh's game was revisited on the April 12, 2008, episode.

=== 1 vs. 100 Gays ===
On January 5, 2008, Jay Contreras, frontman of the band Kamikazee, faced a Mob composed of drag queens and openly gay men from different careers and professions. Prominent members of that Mob included actor IC Mendoza (grandson of talk show host/columnist Inday Badiday), Arroyo impersonator Ate Glow, and TV host, politician, and former Pasay city councilor Justo Justo. Contreras defeated this entire Mob and became the second ever winner of ₱2 million and the first one in the expense of an adult mob. He was also the first person to eliminate his "Ten Picks" since the institution of the rule.

Jay's game was revisited on April 5, 2008.

=== 1 vs. 100 Health and Fitness Special ===
On March 1, 2008, Bea Alonzo faced a Mob composed of celebrities who have worked with her, fitness instructors specialized in either or both yoga and pilates, food technologists and nutritionists, dermatologists, cardiologists, aestheticians, skin consultants, facialists, pole dancers, belly dancers, garlic vendors, and babyfaces. She managed to eliminate her "Ten Picks" and walked away with ₱504,000.

=== Clear Black Post-Valentine Special ===
On March 8, 2008, black-clad Piolo Pascual faced a Mob whose members wore red, the traditional color for Valentine's Day. This was a reference to an advertisement for Clear Anti-Dandruff shampoo and conditioner (a Unilever brand) wherein he plays a Black Cupid whose arrows turn red objects into black. Red was the only common denominator among the Mob members as they were composed of celebrities, dentists, psychologists, chefs, ice cream vendors, and members of the Catholic religious organization CFC-Singles for Christ and the Born-Again group Victory Christian Fellowship, among others. He managed to eliminate his Ten Picks after nine questions, but he decided to forge for the next two. The last Mob member still standing, Maricris, a member of Singles for Christ on Podium 80, was the one setting a record, answering the 11th question correctly and stealing the ₱527,000 he accumulated, after he gave the wrong answer to that same question.

This final scenario was replicated in Ryan Agoncillo's game the next week, but with a bigger loot of ₱689,000 after 11 questions and one mob member left.

== Records and statistics ==
- Most money won - ₱2,000,000 by Reynold "Pooh" Garcia (October 20, 2007) and Jay Contreras (January 5, 2008)
- Least money won - ₱154,000 by Long Mejia (October 27, 2007)
- Most money lost to mob - ₱689,000 by Ryan Agoncillo (March 15, 2008)
- Least money lost to mob - ₱17,000 by Bayani Agbayani (November 11, 2007)
- Most money split by mob members - 1 member, ₱689,000.00 (March 15, 2008)
- Least money split by mob members - 55 members, ₱309.00 each (November 10, 2007)
- Most questions answered correctly - 15 by Reynold "Pooh" Garcia (October 20, 2007)
- Fewest questions answered correctly - 1 by Bayani Agbayani (November 11, 2007)
- Most mob members wrong on a single question - 78 (February 23, 2008)
- Least mob members left after a game (excluding games where the One won ₱2,000,000) - 1 member (March 8, 2008, and March 15, 2008)
- Longest streak by an Unbeatable Mob member - James Marte, 5 games

== Notable Mob members ==
As in the US format, celebrities often participate in the game as Mob members, joining with civilian Mob players to face the opposition. Often, game show champions participate in the Mob, a concept brought in play in the original US episode, where an original Mob member was a well-known quiz show mega-champion.

Here are some of the notable Mob members:

- Alvin Cansalay, Game KNB? ₱1,200,000 winner
- Butch Maniego, Scrabble Champion
- Jiro Manio, Child Prodigy
- CJ de Silva, Child Prodigy
- Ira Alexis Aclan, Child Prodigy
- Gaby Dela Merced, Asian F3 Racer
- Jaime Telmo, Kapamilya, Deal or No Deal ₱324,000 winner
- Louie Vallejo, summa cum laude, B.S. Mathematics, UP Diliman
- Beauty Queens:
  - Anna Theresa Licaros - Bb. Pilipinas-Universe 2007 (Unbeatable 1; won ₱21,937.00)
  - Precious Lara Quigaman - Miss International 2005 (Unbeatable 1; won ₱21,937.00)
  - Margaret Wilson - Bb. Pilipinas-World 2007
  - Gionna Cabrera - Bb. Pilipinas-Universe 2005
  - Nadia Shami - Bb. Pilipinas-International 2007 (Unbeatable 1; won ₱21,937.00)
- Members of the band Cueshé
- Representative Manuel "Way Kurat" Zamora
- Psychics
  - Madam Auring
  - Madam Rosa
  - Star Gazer

Celebrity Mob Members:

- Game 1
  - Ana Roces
  - Arvin "Tado" Jimenez
  - Geoff Eigenmann
  - Jodi Sta. Maria-Lacson
  - Julius "Empoy" Marquez
  - TJ Trinidad
- Game 2
  - AJ Dee
  - Andrea del Rosario
  - Angelu de Leon
  - Kitkat
  - Matet de Leon
  - Nene Tamayo
- Game 3
  - Aldred Gatchalian
  - Assunta de Rossi
  - Jason Gainza
  - Matt Evans
  - Michelle Madrigal
  - Paw Diaz
  - Willie Revillame
- Game 4
  - Yeng Constantino
  - Ryan Eigenmann
  - Maritoni Fernandez
  - Bobby Andrews
  - Baron Geisler
  - Minnie Aguilar
- Game 5
  - Wendy Valdez
  - Bruce Quebral
  - Nel Rapiz
  - Gee-Ann Abrahan
  - Bodie Cruz
  - Dionne Monsanto

- Game 7
  - Rafael Rosell
  - Maricar de Mesa
  - DJ Durano
  - Allan Paule
  - Kian Kazemi
- Game 15
  - Jeffrey Hidalgo
  - Charles Christianson
- Game 16
  - Dexter Doria
  - Bembol Roco
- Game 17
  - Maui Taylor
  - Gwen Garci
  - Renee Summers
- Game 20
  - Angelica Panganiban
  - Charmel de Asis

- Game 21
  - Mickey Ferriols
- Game 22
  - Cassandra Ponti
- Game 27
  - Dino Imperial
  - Empress Schuck
  - Enchong Dee
- Game 28
  - Bangs Garcia

== Celebrity players ==
List of 1 vs. 100 celebrity players.

=== Original Format ===
The following played before the "Ten Picks" rule was implemented.

- Ai Ai de las Alas; won nothing
- Isko Salvador; won nothing
- Mariel Rodriguez; won ₱440,000
- Archie Alemania; won ₱242,000
- Rosanna Roces; won ₱372,000

=== Kids Version ===
The following played in the 1 VS 100 Kids version of the game.

- Randy Santiago; won ₱326,000
- Reynold "Pooh" Garcia; won ₱2,000,000 (first two-million winner)
- Long Mejia; won ₱154,000
- Candy Pangilinan; won nothing
- Bayani Agbayani; won nothing
- Toni Gonzaga; won ₱289,000
- Anne Curtis; won nothing
- Chito Miranda of Parokya ni Edgar; won ₱591,000

=== "Ten Picks" era ===
The following played when the "Ten Picks" rule was implemented. Unless stated otherwise, each of those listed won nothing.

- Kiko Pangilinan
- Marietta "Pokwang" Subong
- Mcoy Fundales
- Ruffa Gutierrez
- Rico J. Puno
- Jay Contreras of Kamikazee; won ₱2,000,000 (second two-million winner)
- Derek Ramsay
- Aiko Melendez; won ₱332,000
- Valerie Concepcion; won ₱317,000
- Kim Atienza
- Jake Cuenca
- Chiz Escudero
- Chin Chin Gutierrez
- Bea Alonzo; won ₱504,000
- Piolo Pascual
- Ryan Agoncillo
- Chokoleit
- Christopher de Leon
