= Up in Here =

Up in Here may refer to:

- "Party Up (Up in Here)", a 2000 song by DMX
- "Up in Here", a song by Kovas
