= Just the Beginning =

Just the Beginning may refer to:

== Film and television ==
- Just the Beginning (German "...und das ist erst der Anfang") 2000 film directed by Pierre Franckh
- Just the Beginning Valemont TV Episode 2009 Nikki Blonsky, Kristen Hager, Jessica Parker Kennedy.

== Music ==
=== Albums ===
- Just the Beginning (Margo Smith & Holly album), 1991
- Just the Beginning (Voices album), 1992
- Just the Beginning (One Voice album), 1999
- Just the Beginning (Grace VanderWaal album), 2017
- Just the Beginning, album by Kurt Carr 2008
- Just the Beginning, album by Phillip Mitchell 2004

=== Songs ===
- "Just the Beginning", song by John Holt
- "Just the Beginning", song by band Europe composed by Joey Tempest / Kee Marcello from Europe album Out of This World, 1988
- "Just the Beginning", song by Voices from their 1992 album Just the Beginning
- "Just the Beginning", by The Game from his 2004 album Untold Story
