= Crowded (song) =

Single by Jeannie Ortega featuring Papoose

from the album No Place Like BKLYN
- Released: February 21, 2006
- Recorded: 2005
- Genre: R&B
- Length: 3:17
- Label: Hollywood
- Songwriters: Mikkel Eriksen; Tor Erik Hermansen; Willie Mackie; Jeannie Ortega
- Producer: Stargate

Jeannie Ortega singles chronology
"It's R Time" (2005)	"Crowded" (2006)	"So Done" (2006)

Papoose singles chronology
"Touch It" (2006)	"Crowded" (2006)	"Ridin'" (2006)

"Crowded" is a song by Jeannie Ortega released as the first official single from her 2006 debut album, No Place Like BKLYN. The song was also featured on the soundtrack to the film Stick It. The song also features underground rapper Papoose. The song charted on the Hot 100 and did well on Pop 100 Airplay.

== Music video ==
The music video was shot in a crowded bar. The video featured an appearance from Terror Squad member Remy Ma.

== Charts ==
Chart performance for "Crowded"
Chart (2006)	Peak position
US Billboard Hot 100	93
US Pop Airplay (Billboard)	25
US Pop 100 (Billboard)	44

== Release history ==
Release dates and formats for "Crowded"
Region	Date	Format	Label(s)	Ref.
United States	March 21, 2006	Mainstream airplay	Hollywood	
