= Big City (Billy Crawford album) =

Studio album by Billy Crawford
- Released: April 12, 2004
- Recorded: 2003–2004
- Label: V2
- Producer: The Corner Boys; Cutfather & Joe; Roy "Royalty" Hamilton; Pete Ibsen; Kovas; Steve Robson; Stargate; Phillip Stewart

Billy Crawford chronology
Ride (2002)	Big City (2004)	It's Time (2007)

Singles from Ride
- 1. "Bright Lights" Released: 2004; 2. "Steamy Nights" Released: 2005

Big City is the third studio album by Filipino-American singer Billy Crawford. It was released by V2 Records on April 12, 2004. The album features production from The Corner Boys, Cutfather, Roy "Royalty" Hamilton, Steve Robson, Stargate and Kovas, whose vocals are featured on the tracks. Conceived as an "adult album", Crawford spent several months in Atlanta, New York and London whered he amassed more than sixty songs for Big City. Upon release, the album peaked at number 12 on the French Albums Chart.

== Track listing ==
No.	Title	Writer(s)	Producer(s)	Length
1.	"Intro"	Kovasciar Myvett	Kovas	1:01
2.	"Steamy Nights"	Myvett; Ryan Shaw	Kovas	3:37
3.	"Bright Lights"	Phillip L. Stewart II; Terius Nash	Stewart	3:32
4.	"Candy Store"	Billy Crawford; Myvett; Shaw	Kovas	4:06
5.	"Magazine"	B. Crawford; Gary Burro; Rob Tewlow	The Corner Boys	3:29
6.	"3 Wishes"	Ali Tennant; Steve Robson; Wayne Hector	Robson	3:37
7.	"Oh Dear"	B. Crawford; Melissa Popo; Patrick "J. Que" Smith; Pete Ibsen	Ibsen	3:10
8.	"Surrender"	B. Crawford; Hallgeir Rustan; Mikkel S. Eriksen; Tor Erik Hermansen	Stargate	3:15
9.	"Know You Wanna"	Dan Grant; Jamie Thompson; Matt Prime; Thomas Jules-Stock	Cutfather & Joe	3:17
10.	"Why"	Ernest Dixon; Roy "Royalty" Hamilton	Hamilton	3:38
11.	"Jump Off"	Dwayne Nesmith; Smith; Pierre Medor	The Corner Boys	3:23
12.	"Hiccups"	B. Crawford; Myvett; Smith; Shaw	Kovas	3:50
13.	"Cowboy"	Shep Crawford; B. Crawford; Myvett; Shaw	Kovas	3:46
14.	"Go'n Girl"	Tricky Stewart; Nesmith; Penelope Magnet; Medor; G. O'Bryan	Stewart; Magnet (co.)	3:30
15.	"Go Go" (featuring Kelli Young)	Joe Belmaati; Mich Hansen; Remee	Cutfather & Joe; Magnet (co.)	4:06

== Charts ==
Chart (2004)	Peak position
Belgian Albums (Ultratop Wallonia)	32
French Albums (SNEP)	12
Swiss Albums (Schweizer Hitparade)	84
