= One Voice (girl group) =

Filipino-American R&B girl group

One Vo1ce
- One Vo1ce in 2022, from left to right: Mae Ceralvo, Marie Ceralvo, and Monica Castillo.

Background information
- Also known as: One Voice; Voice V
- Origin: Vallejo, California, U.S.
- Genres: R&B, pop, freestyle
- Years active: 1996–2005, 2009-present
- Labels: Kamikaze Records (1998–2002, 2019–present); Straight Hits Entertainment (2003-2005)
- Members: Monica Castillo; Anne "Marie" Ceralvo; Edna "Mae" Ceralvo
- Past members: Melissa Ruiz Moreno; Aimee Castillo; Lindsay Mangoba
- Website: http://onevo1cemusic.com/

One Voice (styled as One Vo1ce) is a Filipino-American R&B girl group that originated from Vallejo, California. The group is known for their 1999 single "When U Think About Me".

== Career ==
=== 1996-98: Formation ===
The girls of One Voice met while they were in elementary school. They originally started out as a quintet, which at the time included Aimee Castillo (no relation to Monica), and another original member named Lindsay Mangoba, but before anything was recorded she later left the group and was replaced by Melissa Ruiz. The girls eventually landed a record deal with Kamikaze Records (an independent label) in 1998, and contracted the talent of producer James Earley.

=== 1999-2000: Just The Beginning ===
Original line-up (2000), clockwise from bottom left: Marie Ceralvo, Mae Ceralvo, Monica Castillo, Melissa Ruiz, and Aimee Castillo.

Recording their debut album was tough. The girls wanted it to be just right and they had to make up their minds about what kind of album they wanted to record. First they hired the right producer, multi-platinum producer James "Jae-E" Earley, who wrote and/or produced the majority of the first album. Then, they chose an urban-pop/OPM sound. The group released their first single "All Day All Nite" in October 1998, it failed to chart. The group released their debut album Just the Beginning on April 20, 1999.

Their second single "When U Think About Me" was released to radio stations across the United States and it became their most successful single to date. It peaked at #17 on the US Rhythmic Top 40 chart and #96 on the Hot R&B/Hip-Hop Songs chart. The song was also featured in an original MTV movie called Jailbait. The song was covered by singer Billy Crawford in 2002, where it became a hit in Europe. Due to the success of "When U Think About Me", their album was re-released a year later. The album sold 100,000 copies worldwide and it was certified gold. Two more singles were released from their debut album "Boyfriend", and "Never Leave Your Side", however both songs failed to chart.

=== 2001-02: Lineup change and Sincerely Yours ===
When promotion on Just The Beginning was over, the girls were ready to record their second album. They knew that they would have to show their growth. During this time, Aimee had left the group. The group was hurt by her departure. Even though she left the group, they remained close friends. The group began the recording process of their second album without Aimee. It took another two years but Sincerely Yours was released on June 26, 2001.

It was not as successful as their debut album. The album only sold 45,000 copies worldwide and reviews of the album were mixed. Only two singles were released from the album, but both "Swing Your Love 2 Me" and "So Badd" failed to chart. The girls left the Kamikaze label the following year.

=== 2003-05: Luvin' You and disbandment ===
Quartet line-up (2004): Mae, Melissa, Monica & Marie.

The girls took a little break off to live life. They signed with another independent label, Straight Hits Entertainment. Before the release of their third album, they released a self-titled EP giving fans a sneak peek of their upcoming album. Their third album, Luvin' You, was eventually released on January 27, 2004. It became their most successful album to date, selling 150,000 copies worldwide.

Despite being their most successful album, no singles have been released from the album. The group would split in 2005.

=== 2009–present: Reunion ===
In summer 2009, after a five-year hiatus, One Voice decided to make their return into the music industry. They went back into the studio to record new music and began performing at various events. The group also announced the return of original member, Aimee Castillo. One Vo1ce appeared at the 15th Annual Filipino-American (Fil-Am) Friendship Celebration at the Serramonte Shopping Center, Daly City, CA on September 20, 2009. It was there where they revealed their new single, "Time To Live Your Life".

Aimee and Melissa would later leave the group and they would remain a trio. The group announced that they would release new material and released a new single called "Passion", on July 11, 2019. On July 23, 2021, the trio would release their 4th studio album ISO, which contained the singles "What If", "Friendster", "Joy & Disgust", "Astro 101", and "Trapeze".

== Discography ==
=== Albums ===
- 1999: Just the Beginning
- 2001: Sincerely Yours
- 2004: Luvin' You
- 2021: ISO
- 2024: Here to Stay

=== Singles and EPs ===
- 1998: "All Day All Nite"
- 1999: "When U Think About Me" - #17 U.S. Rhythmic Top 40
- 2000: "Boyfriend"
- 2000: "Never Leave Your Side"
- 2000: "Caught a Crush (On You)" (with April Villanueva)
- 2001: "Swing Your Love 2 Me"/"So Badd"
- 2003: One Vo1ce (EP) (Straight Hits Entertainment)
- 2019: "Passion"
- 2020: The Kamikaze Sessions (EP)
- 2020: "What If"
- 2021: "Friendster" (feat. Shawnie Bo)
- 2021: "Joy & Disgust"
- 2021: "Astro 101"
- 2021: "Trapeze"
- 2022: "Cherry"
