= Tarah Paige =

American gymnast, dancer and actress (born 1982)

- Born: Tarah Hertha Chellevold; July 8, 1982 (age 43); Phoenix, Maricopa County, Arizona
- Years active: 1994–present

Tarah Hertha Chellevold, known as Tarah Paige (born July 8, 1982), is an American gymnast, dancer and actress.

== Biography ==
Daughter of Duane Noah Chellevold and wife Hertha Jane Farmer and sister of Duane Noah Jr. (married to Imee) and Devon Noah Chellevold, paternal granddaughter of Norman Chellewold then Chellevold (b. Wisconsin, son of Ole Chellewold (b. Norway, Sweden-Norway) and wife Dorthea Tangedahl then Dorothea Tangadal (b. Norway, Sweden-Norway)) and wife Helen Brown and maternal granddaughter of Arvel Lewis Farmer (son of Noah Lewis Farmer and wife Lelah/Lela Mae Brown and paternal grandson of H. G. Farmer and wife Mary ...) and wife Hertha Fredericka Hedwig Steiner (b. Missouri, daughter of Otto Steiner (b. Germany, son of parents b. Switzerland) and wife Emma Heideman (b. Germany, daughter of parents b. Germany)).

She has played minor and supporting roles in various television shows and movies, including Malcolm in the Middle, A Cinderella Story, Stick It, Bring It On: All or Nothing, and The Summoning. As a gymnast, she won the bronze medal on the balance beam at 2001 Nationals.

On the ABC Family Channel show Make It or Break It (2009–2012) Tarah worked as the gymnastics coordinator.

== Filmography ==
Year	Film	Role	Notes
2022	The Assassin's Apprentice: Silbadores of the Canary Islands	Kaylee	Short
2018	The Assassin's Apprentice	Kaylee	Short
2016	Scorpion	Cyclist	TV series
2016	Chalk It Up	Emily	
2012	Weeds	Jammer 2	TV series
2012	True Blood	Kathy	TV series
2011	How I Met Your Mother	Kersten	TV series
2011	90210	Prom Cirque Performer	TV series
2009-2010	Make It or Break It	Tricia / Team Member #1	TV series
2009	CSI: NY	Paula Davis	TV series
2009	A Christmas Carol	Dancer	
2009	Dance Flick	Dirty Dancer (uncredited)	
2008	The Kitty Landers Show	Muffy	Short
2008	The Cleaner	Paula Baker	TV series
2008	Otis	Kim	
2007	Business Class	Kelly - Identical Clerk	TV movie
2007	The Middle	Choir Soloist Student	TV movie
2007	The Comebacks	Cheerleader	
2007	She Wore a Yellow Scrunchy	Jenny	Short
2006-2013	CSI: Crime Scene Investigation	Polly / Grace Goodwin	TV series
2006	Bones	Helen Majors	TV series
2006	Left in Darkness	Rachel	Direct to DVD
2006	Just Legal	Jenny	TV series
2006	Bring It On: All or Nothing	Pacific Vista Cheerleader	Direct to DVD
2006	Stick It	Tricia Skilken	
2006	Unfabulous	Emma's Competitor (uncredited)	TV series
2006	Zombie Prom	Dancer	Short
2005	Unfabulous	Emma's competitor	TV series
2005	Related	Cindy	TV series
2005	Mortuary	Sara	
2005	Malcolm in the Middle	Contortionist Girl (uncredited, scene deleted)	TV series
2004	What Should You Do?	Daughter	TV series
2004	A Cinderella Story	Featured Dancer (uncredited)	
2004	Arrested Development	Spring Breaker	TV series
1995	U.S. Customs Classified	Pedophile Victim #1	TV series
1995	Darkfury	Young Alexis	
1994	Sabado Gigante	Guest Artist	TV series
