= Kovas =

American singer-songwriter

KOVAS
- Born: Kovasciar Myvette; August 1, 1985 (age 40); Manhattan, New York, US
- Origin: Brooklyn, New York
- Genres: Hip hop, R&B
- Occupations: Rapper, actor, record producer
- Years active: 2000–present (producer/rapper/songwriter); 1998–present (acting)
- Label: Art School Rebellion Ghetto Beat
- Website: IAmKOVAS.com; KOVASmusic.com

Kovasciar Myvette (born August 1, 1985), known professionally as KOVAS, is an American songwriter, record producer, music composer, and recording artist of Spanish and French descent (Central America and Morocco).

== Career ==
He has produced and remixed records for Justin Timberlake, Chris Brown, Nick Cannon, De La Soul, Nicole Wray, Jeannie Ortega, Shakira, Lady Sovereign, Kelis, M.I.A., Freq Nasty and Billy Crawford. He has done ghost production and songwriting for many successful artists before branching out on his own. KOVAS' songs are represented by Downtown Music Publishing.

In 2017 he won a Clio Award for the Dunkin' Donuts campaign he produced, wrote and starred in with New York Giants wide receiver Odell Beckham Jr. Kovas is also the music composer for the Netflix series' On My Block and The Comedy Line Up.

He scored the music for the opening music sequence of Taylor Swift's "I Knew You Were Trouble" MTV VMA Award-winning music video, five Covergirl commercials. One directed by Hype Williams starring Queen Latifah and another starring Drew Barrymore which air in America and French Canada. His single "Ready" has been featured in the Vibe Magazine Music Mixer iPad app, and has been featured in USA Networks TV show Royal Pains and Necessary Roughness as well as in MTV Rob Dyrdek's Fantasy Factory. Kovas has also had his T.O.A.K featured on the season of Fox's American Dad! from creator Seth MacFarlane who is also the creator of Family Guy. His song "Up in Here" is featured on the Chocolate Swim, Cartoon Network's Adult Swim compilation as well as the Oscar nominated film Captain Phillips. Hot Girls appeared in the #1 film 22 Jump Street.

He is featured on Jeannie Ortega's No Place Like BKLYN album, on which, he wrote and produced three songs; "Pay It" featuring Kovas, "Green I'z" and "Hear Me". He is also featured on the French recording artist's Billy Crawford album, Big City. He produced and wrote four songs on it, including the single "Steamy Nights" and "Steamy Nights Ghetto Beat Remix".

KOVAS has a production company & indie record label called Ghetto Beat & Art School Rebellion. He also runs a publishing company Infinite Rhythm Inc.

KOVAS has appeared on tour with De La Soul, Billy Crawford, Phife Dawg of A Tribe Called Quest, Wyclef Talib Kweli Mos Def and Jeannie Ortega. Kovas plays five instruments, sings, raps and engineers on most of his productions. He has done musical scores for film and TV, winning an Art Directors Award for the ad campaign he wrote and scored for Noggin television.

KOVAS produced, composed and appeared in Dunkin' Donuts with New York Giants wide receiver Odell Beckham Jr.

== Production credits ==
- 2001: "Words & Verbs" (Maseo De La Soul feat. KOVAS) (single)
- 2002: "Brooklyn to Brixton" (Freq Nasty feat. KOVAS) (single)
- 2003: "Attitude" (Nick Cannon)
- 2004: "Intro" (Billy Crawford) (Big City)
- 2004: "Steamy Nights" (Billy Crawford) (Big City)
- 2004: "Three Wishes" (Billy Crawford feat. KOVAS) (Big City)
- 2004: "Hiccups" (Billy Crawford) (Big City)
- 2004: "Cowboy" (Billy Crawford feat. KOVAS) (Big City)
- 2005: "Bounce" (Rosette feat. KOVAS) (Uh Oh)
- 2005: "Mirage" (Rosette feat. KOVAS) (Uh Oh)
- 2005: "Delirious Ghetto Beat Remix" (Rosette feat. KOVAS) (Uh Oh)
- 2005: "I Owe" (Rosette) (Uh Oh)
- 2006: "Pay It" (Jeannie Ortega feat. KOVAS) (No Place Like Brooklyn)
- 2006: "Green I'z" (Jeannie Ortega) (No Place Like Brooklyn)
- 2006: "Hear Me" (Jeannie Ortega) (No Place Like Brooklyn)
- 2008: "Say What" (KOVAS) (The Arrogance of Youth)
- 2008: "Up in Here" (KOVAS) (The Arrogance of Youth)
- 2008: "Love & Touch" (KOVAS) (The Arrogance of Youth)
- 2008: "Popsicle" (KOVAS) (The Arrogance of Youth)
- 2008: "Popcorn" (KOVAS) (The Arrogance of Youth)
- 2008: "T.O.A.K" (KOVAS) (The Arrogance of Youth)
- 2008: "So Hot" (KOVAS) (Prom Night)
- 2008: "Love & Touch" (KOVAS) (Prom Night)
- 2008: "Hasta La Vista" (Camp Rock) (Camp Rock)
- 2009: "Wax on Wax Off" (KOVAS) (Reagan Babies)
- 2009: "Reagan Babies" (KOVAS) (Reagan Babies)
- 2009: "Grape Drank" (KOVAS) (Reagan Babies)
- 2009: "Can't Get Enough" (KOVAS) (Reagan Babies)
- 2010: "It's On" (Camp Rock 2) (Camp Rock 2: The Final Jam)
- 2010: "Tear It Down" (Camp Rock 2) (Camp Rock 2: The Final Jam)
- 2010: "Been Doing My Thang" (Nyne West feat. Yung Joc)
- 2010: "Overdrive" (Nyne West feat. Mario & KOVAS)
- 2010: "UpperCut" (Nyne West feat. Red Cafe)
- 2010: "Full Time Lover" (Nyne West)
- 2010: "Roll The Credits" (Roxxi Jane)
- 2010: "Ready" (KOVAS)
- 2013: "Ice Cream" (KOVAS)
- 2013: "Hello Bright Lights" (KOVAS)
- 2013: "Student to the Game Mixtape" (KOVAS)
- 2014: "Hot Girls"(KOVAS) 22 Jump Street
- 2015: "Hello Bright Lights"(KOVAS) Hello, My Name Is Doris
- 2016: "Like They Do" (Omarion f Nikki Glaser)
- 2018: "Bottle rocket" KOVAS(feat. Domo Genesis) (On My Block)
- 2019: "Ratata" (Nina Dioz) (On My Block)
- 2020: "Lunch Money" (Ainsley Riches) (On My Block)
- 2020: "Tricky Ricky" (Rosé) (On My Block)
- 2020: "Beat On The Street" (Rosé) (On My Block)

=== Remixes ===
- 2005 Billy Crawford f. Kovas – "Steamy Nights (Kovas Ghetto Beat Remix)" V2 Records
- 2006 Shakira f. Wyclef & Kovas – "Hips Don't Lie (Kovas Ghetto Beat Remix)"
- 2006 Lady Sovereign – "Fiddle with the Volume (Kovas Ghetto Beat Remix)" Chocolate Industries
- 2007 Justin Timberlake – "Summer Love (Kovas Ghetto Beat Remix)" Jive Records
- 2008 Chris Brown – "With You (Kovas Ghetto Beat Remix)" Jive Records / Ultra Records
- 2008 T-Pain f Lil Wayne – "Can't Believe It (Kovas Ghetto Beat Remix)" Jive Records
- 2008 T-Pain f Ludacris – "Chopped & Skrewed (Kovas Ghetto Beat Remix)" Jive Records
- 2009 Ciara f Young Jeezy – "Chopped & Skrewed (Kovas Ghetto Beat Remix)" Jive Records
- 2009 Michelle Williams – "Hello Heartbreak (Kovas Ghetto Beat Remix)" Sony Records
- 2010 Usher f will.i.am – "OMG (Kovas Ghetto Beat Remix)" Jive Records

Movie & Soundtrack information
American Virgin and Soundtrack
- Released: Dec 2009
- Kovas had six songs in the movie: "Say What", "Love and Touch",

"Up in Here" "Morning Wood" "Grape Drank" and "As the Sun Sinks"
He had two songs on the soundtrack: "Love and Touch", and "Up in Here"

Video Game & Soundtrack information
Madden NFL 09 videogame and soundtrack
- Released: August 12, 2008
- Kovas had 1 song in the videogame and soundtrack: "Wax On, Wax Off"

Movie & Soundtrack information
Prom Night and Soundtrack
- Released: April 11, 2008
- Kovas had four songs in the movie: "Say What", "Love and Touch",

"Up in Here" and "So Hot (Popcorn)"
He had two songs on the soundtrack: "Love and Touch", and "Up in Here"

EP information
Reagan Babies EP
- Released: March 2008
- Written, Composed, Performed,
  Arranged and Produced by Kovas: "Reagan Babies EP"

Tracks: "Reagan Babies",
"Wax On Wax Off", "Grape Drank"
"Can't Get Enough"

It's Time – Kovas vs. Billy Crawford
- Released: December 2007
- Written, Composed, Performed,
  Arranged and Produced by Kovas: "It's Time"

Tracks: "It's Time (Kovas'Deux Cafés Dans Montmartre Remix)",
"Kovas' Directors Commentary", "He Said/She Said (Original '03 Demo)"

The Arrogance of Youth
- Released: June 13, 2007
- Written, Composed, Performed,
  Arranged and Produced by Kovas: "Say What"

Tracks: "Popsicle", "Love and Touch", "Popcorn",
"The Break Up Song", "T.O.A.K", "Up in Here"

== Other albums and songs produced by Kovas ==
Album information
Crack The Code by Empire ISIS
- Released: April 26, 2011
- Produced: "NANA Power", "Louder", "Bang Bang", "Permanent Stranger", "Rich Girl". Also Produced the unreleased bonus track "Last Woman Standing"
No Place Like BKLYN by Jeannie Ortega
- Released: August 1, 2006
- Produced: "Pay It" featuring Kovas, "Green I'z", "Hear Me"
Chocolate Swim
- Released: June 26, 2006
- Genre: Hip hop
- Length: 24:09
- Label:Adultswim.com
- Produced: "Up In Here"
Big City Tour Live by Billy Crawford
- Released: August 2005
- Produced: "Intro", "Steamy Nights", "Candy Store", "3 Wishes" featuring Kovas, and "Hiccups"

Digital single
"With You" by Chris Brown
- Released: March 4, 2008
- Tracks: "With You (Kovas Ghetto Beat Remix)"

Single information
"Steamy Nights" by Billy Crawford
- Released: February 22, 2005 France
- Album:Big City
- Produced: "Steamy Nights", "Steamy Nights Ghetto Beat Remix" featuring Kovas
