= When U Think About Me =

1999 single by One Voice

Single by One Vo1ce

from the album Just the Beginning
- Released: 1999
- Genre: R&B, pop
- Songwriter(s): J. Early

One Vo1ce singles chronology
"All Day All Nite" (1998)	"When U Think About Me" (1999)	"Boyfriend" (2000)

Music video
- "When U Think About Me" by One Vo1ce on YouTube

"When U Think About Me" is a song by Filipino-American R&B girl group One Vo1ce, released as the second single from their 1999 debut album Just the Beginning. The single reached number 96 on the Hot R&B/Hip-Hop Songs chart, and number 17 on the US Rhythmic Top 40 chart. A music video was also released for the song.

It was also used in an original MTV film called Jailbait.

== Billy Crawford version ==
"When You Think About Me"

Single by Billy Crawford

from the album Ride
- Released: 2002
- Genre: R&B, pop
- Length: 3:20
- Label: Sony
- Songwriter(s): J. Early
- Producer(s): Eve Nelson

Billy Crawford singles chronology
"Trackin'" (2002)	"When You Think About Me" (2002)	"You Didn't Expect That" (2002)

Music video
- "When You Think About Me" by Billy Crawford on YouTube

The song was covered in 2002 by the Filipino-American singer Billy Crawford as "When You Think About Me" alongside a released music video. The song also appears in his second studio album Ride. It charted in European charts peaking at No. 14 in France as well as charting in Belgium, Germany, Netherlands, and Switzerland.

=== Track listing ===
The remixed 12" release contains five remixes.

1. "When You Think About Me (Club Remix by Shanon)" (5:08)
2. "When You Think About Me (Two Step Mix)" (3:48)
3. "When You Think About Me (The Orange Factory Remix)" (3:32)
4. "When You Think About Me (The Beat Clinic Remix)" (3:08)
5. "When You Think About Me (Radio Mix (Long Remix))" (3:20)

== Charts ==
One Vo1ce/Voice V version

Chart (2000)	Peak position
US Hot R&B/Hip-Hop Songs (Billboard)	96
US Rhythmic (Billboard)	17

Billy Crawford version

Chart (2003)	Peak position
Belgium (Ultratop 50 Wallonia)	21
France (SNEP)	14
Germany (GfK)	48
Netherlands (Single Top 100)	16
Switzerland (Schweizer Hitparade)	24
