= Ride (Billy Crawford album) =

Studio album by Billy Crawford
- Released: July 8, 2002
- Recorded: 2001
- Label: V2
- Producers: Anders Barren; Bloodshy & Avant; Davey Boy; Marc Duvert; Rob Fusari; Wayne Hector; Eve Nelson; Steve Robson; Raul Santiago; Jany Schella; Soulshock & Karlin; Phillip L. Stewart

Billy Crawford chronology
Billy Crawford (1999)	Ride (2002)	Big City (2004)

Singles from Ride
- 1. "When You're in Love with Someone" Released: 2001; 2. "Trackin'" Released: 2002; 3. "When You Think About Me" Released: 2002; 4. "You Didn't Expect That" Released: 2003; 5. "Me passer de toi" Released: 2003

Ride is the second studio album by Filipino-American singer Billy Crawford. It was released by V2 Records on July 8, 2002. Crawford worked with a variety of musicians on the album, including Bloodshy & Avant, Rob Fusari, Wayne Hector, Eve Nelson, Steve Robson, and Soulshock & Karlin. Following the commercial failure of lead single "When You're in Love with Someone" in the United States, the domestic release of Ride was cancelled. Elsewhere, it entered the top ten on the French Albums Chart. Ride produced the number-one hit "Trackin'" as well as three additional singles that followed, along with a special edition re-release in 2003.

== Track listing ==
No.	Title	Writer(s)	Producer(s)	Length
1.	"Trackin'"	Adam Anders; Anders Barren; Nikki Hassman; Jany Schella	Barren; Jany	4:02
2.	"When You Think About Me"	James Earley	Eve Nelson	3:19
3.	"You Didn't Expect That"	Ali Tennant; Steve Robson; Wayne Hector	Robson; Hector	3:25
4.	"Waterfalls"	David Lindsey; Percy Chapman; Raheem DeVaughn; Raul Santiago	Marc Duvert; Davey Boy; Santiago	4:10
5.	"Ride"	Bernadette O'Reilly; Billy Crawford; Eve Nelson	Nelson	4:02
6.	"When You're in Love with Someone"	Nelson; Matt Goss	Nelson	4:26
7.	"That's the Way Love Is"	Byron Burke; Byron Stingily; Herb Lawson	Soulshock & Karlin	4:15
8.	"If It's Alright"	Katrina Willis; Phillip L. Stewart; Traci Hale	Stewart	3:23
9.	"I'm Serious"	Balewa Muhammad; Falonte Moore; Rob Fusari	Fusari	3:05
10.	"I Wish"	Willis; Stewart	Stewart	4:34
11.	"Gotta Catch Up to You"	Brian Attmore; Chuck Giscombe; Samuel Gerongco	Nelson	3:17
12.	"Before"	O'Reilly; Crawford; Nelson	Nelson	3:48

Special edition bonus tracks
No.	Title	Writer(s)	Producer(s)	Length
13.	"The Way She Rocks My World"	Crawford; Christian Karlsson; Fredrik Ödesjö; Henrik Jonback; Pontus Winnberg	Bloodshy & Avant	3:51
14.	"Changing My Color"	O'Reilly; Crawford; Nelson	Nelson	4:08
15.	"Me passer de toi"	Willis; Stewart	Stewart	4:03

== Charts ==
=== Weekly charts ===
Chart (2002)	Peak position
Belgian Albums (Ultratop Wallonia)	22
Dutch Albums (Album Top 100)	53
French Albums (SNEP)	7
German Albums (Offizielle Top 100)	73
Swiss Albums (Schweizer Hitparade)	17

=== Year-end charts ===
Chart (2002)	Position
Belgian Albums (Ultratop Wallonia)	43
French Albums (SNEP)	23
Swiss Albums (Schweizer Hitparade)	72

== Certifications ==
Region	Certification	Certified units/sales
France (SNEP)	Platinum	300,000^{*}
Switzerland (IFPI Switzerland)	Gold	20,000^{^}
^{*} Sales figures based on certification alone.^{^} Shipments figures based on certification alone.
