= Sincerely Yours (One Voice album) =

Studio album by One Voice
- Released: June 26, 2001
- Genre: R&B
- Label: Kamikaze

One Voice chronology
Just the Beginning (1999)	Sincerely Yours (2001)	Luvin' You (2004)

Sincerely Yours is the second album by R&B group One Voice, released in 2001. The album was supposed to show their growth as artists, but was less successful than their debut album and received mixed reviews. Along with the album came a new sexy image. The album would only sell 20,000 copies in the United States and 25,000 copies in the Philippines where it only went silver. This would be their last album with Kamikaze.

"Swing Your Love 2 Me" and "So Badd" were both released as singles, but both failed to find success.

== Track listing ==
1. "So Badd"
2. "Thru It All"
3. "Swing Your Love 2 Me"
4. "I Don't Want to Dance Alone"
5. "Make Believe"
6. "Crying Game"
7. "Get Your Hands Off Me"
8. "Acapella Interlude"
9. "U Brighten Up My Life"
10. "Serenade"
11. "My Angel"
12. "Never Leave Your Side (Remix)"
