= Stick It =

2006 film by Jessica Bendinger

- Theatrical release poster
- Directed by: Jessica Bendinger
- Written by: Jessica Bendinger
- Produced by: Gail Lyon
- Starring: Jeff Bridges; Missy Peregrym; Vanessa Lengies; Jon Gries; Gia Carides; Julie Warner
- Cinematography: Daryn Okada
- Edited by: Troy Takaki
- Music by: Michael Simpson
- Production companies: Touchstone Pictures; Spyglass Entertainment; Kaltenbach Pictures
- Distributed by: Buena Vista Pictures Distribution
- Release date: April 28, 2006
- Running time: 103 minutes
- Country: United States
- Language: English
- Budget: $20 million
- Box office: $32 million

Stick It is a 2006 American teen comedy-drama film starring Jeff Bridges, Missy Peregrym and Vanessa Lengies written and directed by Bring It On writer Jessica Bendinger; the film marks her directorial debut and to date her only directorial work. It was produced by Touchstone Pictures and Spyglass Entertainment and was released in theatres on April 28, 2006.

== Plot ==
Haley Graham is a rebellious 17-year-old who has a run-in with the law when she and two friends stage an illegal bike-race through a residential construction site in Plano, Texas. Arrested and brought before a judge, Haley is forced to return to the world of professional gymnastics.

Haley was once considered one of the most talented and promising gymnasts in the U.S.; known for her flair and raw power which enabled her to perform higher difficulty moves her fellow competitors couldn't but was not known for her consistency. One year earlier, she made it to the World Gymnastics Championships, but she walked out of the team all-around finals just before her final floor-routine; costing the American team the gold medal, leaving her teammates in tears and simultaneously ruining both her reputation and her future prospects. Haley retired from the sport that day.

Haley enrolls in the elite Vickerman Gymnastics Academy (VGA) in Houston, her ultimate nightmare, run by legendary coach Burt Vickerman. Haley has a talk with Vickerman, who offers to handle her training until she can enter an upcoming invitational competition; she plans to use the prize money to settle the property-damage claims she owes and then retire once again. Disliking the sport's rigid rules and intense training-schedule, Haley is reluctant to come out of retirement. Her attitude toward her fellow gymnasts—as well as her past—causes conflicts, so she reluctantly agrees to ask Vickerman to teach her how to "control her trick", rather than always "flooring it".

At the invitational, Haley's talent shines and her return from gymnastics retirement seems for the better. But all is not what it seems in the scoring system. She starts to remember one of the many reasons why she retired to begin with: the flaws in judging. The panels do not look at the difficulty of the move, nor do they look at the technique; they merely take deductions for unimportant, minor errors. As Haley says, "It doesn't matter how well you do. It's how well you follow their rules."

In addition, Haley is severely stressed by her domineering mother—Alice—who has arrived to watch the meet. Her conduct at the World Championship ("Worlds") has not been forgotten by the other athletes nor by the fans and they treat her with open hostility, including one fan tossing a full cup of soda at her, requiring her to buy a new leotard. After making a mistake in her balance-beam routine, Haley finally breaks down and—in a repeat of the World Championships a year earlier—leaves the arena before completing the competition. However, before she leaves, she reveals to Vickerman the reason why she walked out of Worlds the first time: she had just learned of her mother's affair with her coach, leading to a divorce and Haley losing contact with her father.

Haley returns to the judge and states that she is ready to accept her punishment, but the judge tells Haley that someone has just paid off all of her debts, meaning she is no longer under any legal issues and having "jerks for parents" doesn't need to ruin her life.

Haley then approaches Vickerman, who reveals that he used money left to him by her father to pay for coaching. Vickerman persuades Haley to remain with the academy a while longer so that she can continue with her training to reach Nationals. Although she did not complete the invitational, Haley continues to train and—through her dedication—successfully qualifies for the National Championships along with three of her teammates: Mina Hoyt, Wei Wei Yong, and Joanne Charis.

Despite giving what the commentators described as "the performance of her life" in the all-around finals, the overly critical and harsh judging leaves her finishing in 7th place; but this does not keep her out of the individual event-finals. In the first event-final, vault, Mina executes an extremely difficult maneuver perfectly but inexplicably receives a large half-point deduction; resulting in a score of 9.500, indicating that—had it not been for the deduction—she would have scored a perfect 10.000. When Vickerman questions the judges, he learns that Mina was penalized on the technicality of (unintentionally) showing a bra strap, leaving him and the crowd incensed. Haley is up next and, finally losing patience with the judges, angrily tosses her tracksuit down in frustration. She deliberately shows both her bra straps to the judges and—instead of vaulting—jumps to stand on top of the vault, giving the judges a rock-symbol salute, and forfeits her turn in disgust (otherwise known as a "scratch").

Haley's bold action sparks a movement. Joanne, in turn, shocks her mother by treating the run-up as a catwalk before showing her own bra straps, scratching as well. Showing solidarity with Mina, the other gymnasts in the vault final do the same, forcing the judges to award Mina the vault gold-medal. Joanna realizes that the gymnasts have the power to choose the "winner" of each event if they all agree to sabotage the competition by intentionally scratching. Realizing their shared feeling of frustration at the scoring system, the other gymnasts agree to collaborate in forcing the judges to award the gold to the gymnasts of their choice. Nastia Liukin wins the uneven bars by being the only gymnast to complete any technical move, with no silver or bronze medal being awarded.

Before the balance-beam final, the judges try to foil the movement by reinstating Tricia Skilken (Tarah Paige), a longtime judges' favorite and Haley's former teammate and best friend who had won the all-around final the day before. Tricia competes and ends up winning the event, but the gymnasts' chosen "winner", Wei Wei, completely undermines the judges' scoring system by performing a breakdance-inspired routine, leaving the crowd and her fellow gymnasts in awe. Although given a much-lower score due to so many moves being considered non-standard, the judges have no choice but to award her the silver medal.

Before Haley's final floor-routine, Vickerman approaches her and tells her how proud he is to be her coach and, going against his own coaching advice from earlier, says: "don't you dare hold back, and floor it". Haley performs a powerful, highly challenging routine in which her personality shines through; and receives a standing ovation from the crowd and her fellow gymnasts, but the judges still find 0.900 worth deduction. Finally realizing what her fellow gymnasts were trying to say by scratching, Tricia stuns the rest of the arena by scratching herself, leaving Haley to win gold. What started out as a gymnastics competition turns into a small revolution against the rules of gymnastics competitions, and Haley learns that she has been offered several athletic scholarships to compete in NCAA gymnastics.

== Cast ==
- Jeff Bridges as Burt Vickerman
- Missy Peregrym as Haley Graham
- Vanessa Lengies as Joanne Charis
- Jon Gries as Brice Graham
- Gia Carides as Alice Graham
- Julie Warner as Phyllis Charis
- Annie Corley as Officer Ferguson
- Polly Holliday as Judge Westreich
- John Kapelos as Chris DeFrank
- Kellan Lutz as Frank
- Svetlana Efremova as Dorrie
- John Patrick Amedori as Poot
- Maddy Curley as Mina Hoyt
- Nikki SooHoo as Wei Wei Yong
- Lee Garlington as Head Vault Judge
- Tarah Paige as Tricia Skilken
- Andrea Bendewald as Madison's Mom

Doubles

- Isabelle Severino – Missy Peregrym's gymnastics double (main)
- Jessica Miyagi – Missy Peregrym's gymnastics double (beam routine – IG Classic)
- Annie Gagnon – Vanessa Lengies's gymnastics double
- Kate Stopper – Maddy Curley's gymnastics double
- Tacia Van Vleet – Nikki SooHoo's gymnastics double

Cameos

- Tim Daggett – Himself
- Elfi Schlegel – Herself
- Bart Conner – Himself
- Carly Patterson – Herself
- Nastia Liukin – Herself
- Valeri Liukin – Himself (Nastia Liukin's spotter in her uneven bars routine)
- Mohini Bhardwaj
- Allana Slater
- Yang Yun
- Stephanie Moorhouse

== Soundtrack ==
1. We Run This – Missy Elliott
2. Abra Cadabra – Talib Kweli
3. Beware of the Boys – Panjabi MC (Mundian To Bach Ke)
4. Fire Fire – Fannypack/Mr. Vegas
5. Dance Commander – Electric Six
6. The Game – Jurassic 5
7. If I Only Knew – Lisa Lavie
8. Breakdown – The Toques featuring Mark Foster
9. Nu Nu (Yeah Yeah) – Fannypack (Double J & Hayze Extended mix)
10. Crowded – Jeannie Ortega featuring Papoose
11. Anthem Part Two – Blink-182
12. Hittin' The Bars – Mike Simpson
13. Come Baby Come – K7
14. Outta My Way – Damone
15. Love Song – J.P. Amedori (Bonus Track)

The movie also features brief pieces of other songs, which were not included in the soundtrack, including Green Day's "Brain Stew" and "Holiday", My Morning Jacket's "One Big Holiday" and Fall Out Boy's "Our Lawyer Made Us Change The Name Of This Song So We Wouldn't Get Sued" and "I Slept With Someone in Fall Out Boy and All I Got Was this Stupid Song Written About Me."

== Release ==
=== Box office ===
Stick It was released on April 28, 2006, and grossed $10,803,610 in the opening weekend. The movie grossed $26,910,736 total in the domestic market and $5,066,112 internationally for a total of $31,976,848 after 13 weeks at the box office. The film had the highest per screen average on its opening weekend with 2,038 movie theaters, making an average of $5,301 per screen.

== Reception ==
On Rotten Tomatoes, the film has a score of 30%, based on 96 reviews, with an average rating of 5/10. The site's consensus states: "Director Jessica Bendinger is unable to transfer her winning Bring It On formula to the world of gymnastics, despite Missy Peregrym's strong lead performance." On Metacritic, it has a score of 52 out 100, based on reviews from 25 critics. Audiences surveyed by CinemaScore gave it a grade of B+.

=== Critical response ===
Critic Nathan Lee of The New York Times gave the film a positive review, stating, "A spry teenage comedy that gets everything right, Stick It takes the usual batch of underdogs, dirt bags, mean girls and bimbos and sends them somersaulting through happy clichés and unexpected invention."

Roger Ebert gave the film 2 out of 4 and wrote: "The movie seems to fear that if it pauses long enough to actually be about gymnastics, the audience will grow restless."

== Legacy ==
The film inspired Canadian Olympic medalist Sophiane Méthot to begin her career in gymnastics at the age of eight.

== See also ==
- Code of Points (artistic gymnastics)
- Make It or Break It, a television series that was inspired by this film
