= Game Ka Na Ba? =

2001–22 Philippine television game show

- Title card from 2020 to 2022
- Also known as: Million-Million Na! Game Ka Na Ba? (2002–03); Next Level Na! Game Ka Na Ba? (2003–04); Pilipinas, Game Ka Na Ba? (2004–09)
- Genre: Game show
- Created by: Willy Cuevas
- Written by: Cecille Matutina (2001–09); Ruth Peña-Padriga (2009); Willenito Tormis Jr. (Creative Director, 2020–22); Karla Gacusana (2020–21)
- Directed by: Bobet Vidanes (2001–09); Rico Navarro (2020–22)
- Creative directors: Willy Cuevas (2001–09); Jorron Monroy (2020–22)
- Presented by: Kris Aquino (2001–07); Edu Manzano (2007–09); Robi Domingo (2020–22)
- Country of origin: Philippines
- Original language: Filipino
- No. of seasons: Original: 8 Revival: 3
- No. of episodes: Original: 2,091; Revival: 252

Production
- Executive producers: Rachel Aguilos; Mark Rejano; Elai Tabilog (2020–22); Zyrel Marquez (2020–22)
- Production location: Studio 8, ABS-CBN (2001–09)
- Camera setup: Multiple-camera setup
- Running time: 30 minutes (2001–04, 2020); 1 hour (2004–09)
- Production companies: ABS-CBN Studios; Kumu (2020–22); Jeepney TV (2020–21)

Original release
- Network: ABS-CBN
- Release: October 8, 2001 – October 23, 2009
- Network: Jeepney TV (2020–21); Kumu (2020–22)
- Release: October 12, 2020 – June 18, 2022

Game Ka Na Ba?, (lit. 'are you game?') formerly Million-Million Na! Game Ka Na Ba?, Next Level Na! Game Ka Na Ba?, and Pilipinas Game Ka Na Ba (stylized in short form as Game KNB?) is a Philippine television game show broadcast by ABS-CBN and Jeepney TV. Originally hosted by Kris Aquino, it aired on ABS-CBN's Primetime Bida line up from October 8, 2001 to February 27, 2004, and was replaced by Star Circle Quest. The show moved to the Bigtime Trio line up from November 15, 2004 to October 23, 2009, and was replaced by Showtime. The show was revived to Jeepney TV from October 12, 2020 to November 19, 2021 and on Kumu from February 19 to June 18, 2022. Robi Domingo serve as the final host.

The main goal of the game is to win 2 million pesos (either 1 million, progressive jackpot, or a brand new car in earlier versions) by answering trivia questions.

The KNB in the stylized title of the game show stands for ka na ba ("are you" in English), making the full title Pilipinas, Game Ka Na Ba? (literally, Philippines, Are You Ready [to Play]?). The KNB is derived from SMS language, along with the Nokia-derived chiptune theme song which was in keeping with the original game show's cellular phone-centric theme at the time when text messaging started becoming popular in the Philippines.

== Hosts ==
Kris Aquino hosted the show since its debut on October 8, 2001, until March 3, 2007, when she took a maternity leave for being seven months pregnant and decided to focus on Kapamilya, Deal or No Deal. She was replaced by Edu Manzano on March 5, 2007, until the original run's final episode on October 23, 2009.

Several guest hosts were also featured throughout the original run of the show. Korina Sanchez became the guest host on the Game Ka Na Ba? finale featuring Aquino as a player. On Next Level Na, Game Ka Na Ba?, Dominic Ochoa, Isko "Brod Pete" Salvador, Long Mejia, Charlene Gonzales and Marvin Agustin became guest co-hosts.

Toni Gonzaga and Vhong Navarro hosted the pre-seventh anniversary special of Pilipinas, Game Ka Na Ba? from October 31 to November 3, 2008.

On October 2, 2020, Robi Domingo was announced as the host of the revival of the show.

== History ==
Pilipinas, Game Ka Na Ba? has undergone several formats throughout its eight-year run:

=== 2001–2002: Game Ka Na Ba? (1st incarnation) ===
Game Ka Na Ba? Payout Structure
Round		Prize
6	Jackpot	P1,000,000
5	Jackpot	P500,000
4	Jackpot	P300,000
3	Jackpot	Showcase
2	Face-Off	P100,000
1	Elimination	P10,000
Guaranteed amount Top prize

In Game Ka Na Ba? (stylized as Game KNB?), there were six levels with a top prize of ₱1,000,000.

Elimination round

Three five-player groups of phone-in contestants answered five yes-or-no questions, with incorrect responders eliminated after each round. If more than two remained after the final question, the two fastest correct responders won ₱10,000 and advanced to the Face-Off round.

Face-Off round

Nine possible answers to nine questions were displayed on the board. Players buzzed in to respond, and the one with the most correct answers earned a guaranteed ₱100,000 and advanced to the Jackpot round.

Jackpot round

In the "Solo Round," the player chose from nine categories and answered five multiple-choice questions per round. The Showcase round had four answer choices, the ₱300,000 round had three, and the ₱500,000 round had two. Players could change their answer until saying “Sure na!” To win a round, they had to get at least three correct. After each round, they could walk away or continue. Failing to get three right dropped winnings to ₱100,000 and ended the game. In the ₱1,000,000 round, the player had to answer one open-ended question correctly to win; otherwise, they walked away with ₱100,000. This format was used in special episodes and the show's final weeks in 2003.

=== 2002–2003: Million-Million Na! Game Ka Na Ba? ===
Million-Million Na! Game Ka Na Ba? Payout Structure
Round		Prize	
6	Jackpot	Progressive Jackpot	Car
5	Jackpot	P500,000	
4	Jackpot	P300,000	
3	Jackpot	Showcase	
2	Face Off	P100,000	
1	Elimination	P10,000	
Guaranteed amount Top prize

The Million-Million Na! Game Ka Na Ba? format retained its core structure but introduced a progressive jackpot, starting at ₱1,000,000 and increasing by ₱100,000 each time it wasn’t won—resetting after a win. A brand-new car was also offered as an alternative top prize. In its final weeks in 2003, the Elimination and Face-Off Rounds were removed.

=== 2003–2004: Next Level Na! Game Ka Na Ba? ===
On October 6, 2003, Next Level Na, Game Ka Na Ba? debuted with a similar format to Million-Million Na but added physical and luck-based games, including Talino (Intellect), Tsamba (Luck), and Tapang (Strength). The show was relaunched in 2004 as a daytime program.

==== Standard Format ====
In the regular format of this version, up to six rounds (Levels 1–6) begin with 8 contestants.

- Level 1: Tsamba Eliminations – Contestants guess the outcome of a situational scene with "Yes" or "No" answers. This continues until 4 remain, each winning ₱10,000.
- Level 2: Tapang Dares – The 4 players face physical or mental challenges (e.g., races, stunts, or daring tasks). The 2 fastest move on, each winning ₱50,000.
- Level 3: Talino Face-Off – The final 2 compete in a sudden-death Q&A. The one with the most correct answers advances to the next episode, winning ₱100,000.
- Level 4 challenges the remaining contestant with up to four boxes, each containing a Talino, Tsamba, or Tapang game. Successfully completing any two advances the player to Level 5 and raises their winnings to ₱200,000.
- In Level 5, the contestant faces two more boxes and must complete at least one to win ₱300,000 and move on to Level 6, the final round.
- Level 6 features a single high-risk Tsamba game. The contestant can either risk their ₱300,000 for a chance at the ₱1,000,000 jackpot—failing cuts their winnings to ₱150,000—or walk away with their current ₱300,000.

==== "Tapang Dare Special" Format ====
In the show's later run (Jan–Feb 2004), the format shifted offsite, often featuring two or more contestants—mainly celebrities—competing in Tapang games. Each game awarded cash, or in race-style variations, the first to complete all challenges won a fixed prize. Locations included resorts and landmarks across the Philippines, with games themed to each venue.

Tapang games were assisted by “Game Boys” and “Game Girls” (male and female models) who played roles that could help or hinder contestants—acting as referees, obstacles, or partners. Occasionally, celebrities also took on these roles.

=== 2004–2009: Pilipinas, Game Ka Na Ba? ===
The show underwent multiple format changes, which Edu Manzano explained were intended to keep viewers engaged and avoid the "sawa" (overexposure) factor.

==== 2004–2006: Pyramid format ====
Title card used in the Pyramid format.

From November 15, 2004, to June 10, 2006, the show featured a pyramid stage and the "Tarantarium"— a room filled with books and references where 10 electronically selected contestants had 30 minutes to study. In the elimination round, each contestant answered up to two questions (e.g., "One-on-One Tayo" or "Dibdiban Na!"). The first four to answer both correctly advanced, while any incorrect answer led to elimination, regardless of how many had already qualified.

The pyramid stage featured 15 hexagons resembling a honeycomb. Contestants answered questions to advance upward. When challenged, they said "Alis Ka!" and answered a question to steal another contestant’s spot; a correct answer swapped places, while a wrong one kept positions unchanged.

The first contestant to reach the top won ₱50,000 and challenged the defending winner in a clincher round. The defending winner picked a question category, and both players alternated bidding on how many answers they could give. The player who conceded let the other answer within a timed limit (5 seconds per answer). The player who gives all correct answers also won a motorcycle. If the challenger won, they took the prize and advanced; if they failed, they left with ₱25,000, and the defending winner moved on.

The clincher round winner advanced to the Million Peso Jackpot Round, choosing a question category. They had 60 seconds to study in the Tarantarium and 60 seconds to answer. A correct answer won ₱1,000,000 and named them the new defending winner; a wrong answer required them to return in later episodes with increased winnings.

==== 2005–2008: Pasko Na, Game Ka Na Ba? ====
In December 2005, ABS-CBN aired Pasko Na, Game Ka Na Ba?, a celebrity charity special using the Pyramid format. For the show's sixth anniversary in November 2007, the special returned for two weeks with the Atras-Abante format, inviting near-jackpot past players to compete for charity. The title was used again in December 2008 with the Word-Picture format.

==== 2006–2008: Atras-Abante format ====
Title card used in the Atras-Abante format.

The Atras-Abante format ran from June 12, 2006, to May 3, 2008, marking Aquino’s final hosting stint. On March 5, 2007, Aquino left the show for pregnancy leave, and Manzano permanently replaced her.

This format retained elements of the pyramid style, with contestants aiming to unseat the defending winner. Ten text-registered players competed in an elimination round featuring nine categories and random letters indicating answer initials. Correct answers advanced players, while incorrect ones were eliminated— but others could steal the question.

In the Atras-Abante round, five contestants answered questions to reach the Yellow Line; the first to arrive earned an extra ₱10,000. Each had two options and two Atras Powers: say "Abante Ako!" to move forward one step (up to four steps) or say "Atras si [name]!" to push one or two opponents back one step.

The two contestants who reached the Yellow Line joined the defending winner in a Knock-Out round. The defending winner (or if no defending winner, the first player to reached the Yellow Line) chose one of three word sets with an associated category. Players are given 20 seconds of thinking time, then they took turns answering within aiming for a set number of correct answers. Wrong, repeated, or no answers eliminated a player and pushed them back. The first to answer to give the last possible answer correctly won ₱30,000; the last remaining player advanced to the ₱1,000,000 Jackpot Round and earned ₱50,000. The other two received ₱10,000 and ₱20,000 consolation prizes.

In the ₱1,000,000 Jackpot Round, the defending winner had 10 seconds to review eight categories, then faced six letters— three given by the host and three chosen by the contestant— each representing the first letter of possible answers in a random category. The goal was to name all six answers correctly within 60 seconds to win the jackpot and an automatic prize. If unsuccessful, the contestant drew a bonus letter to win a smaller prize if it matched a correct answer; otherwise, they won nothing. Winners defended their title in the next episode, continuing until defeated or winning the jackpot.

==== 2008–2009: Word & Picture format ====
Title card used in the Word & Picture format.

The Word & Picture format ran from May 5, 2008, to April 8, 2009. The show started with the elimination round. 30 contestants were situated in the gallery, one of which was the defending champion. A contestant was randomly chosen to answer a question, and they were eliminated if they did not answer or answered incorrectly. Once four players qualified, the champion received a question. If they did not get it right, more players were randomly chosen to answer the question until a correct answer was given. The five players went on to the next round; anyone who did not get chosen to answer a question would return in the next episode to compete again.

In the Pick-A-Word round, contestants answered nine questions linked to clue words on an LED wall, each worth ₱1,000, ₱3,000, or ₱5,000, within eight minutes. The first question and value were random; subsequent choices were made by the last correct respondent. Correct answers added points; wrong or skipped questions deducted them. Five consecutive correct answers won the pot. Scores were shown numerically and as platforms rising or falling. The top three advanced; others took home half their score.

₱1,000	₱3,000	₱5,000
WORD	WORD	WORD
WORD	WORD	WORD
WORD	WORD	WORD

The Take-A-Pic round was like the previous one but used photos of famous people instead of words, with higher values (₱5,000, ₱7,000, ₱10,000) and a five-minute limit. The highest scorer won their full amount and advanced; others received half their score.

₱5,000	₱7,000	₱10,000
PICTURE	PICTURE	PICTURE
PICTURE	PICTURE	PICTURE
PICTURE	PICTURE	PICTURE

In the final round, the player chose one of nine words and answered seven themed questions in 60 seconds. Answering all correctly won ₱1,000,000. If not, the player picked an envelope with letters G, A, M, E, K, N, or B linked to a question; a match with a correct answer won a prize showcase, otherwise nothing. The defending winner returned next episode until defeated.

==== 2009: Team format ====
Title card used in the team format.

The Team Format, announced in late 2008 and aired from April 13 to October 23, 2009, was a spin-off of the original group format. Eight teams of three competed for ₱2,000,000 across four rounds: Elimination, Taranta (Panic), Diskarte (Strategy), and Jackpot, combining thrills, luck, teamwork, and excitement.

The elimination round began with eight teams— red, orange, yellow, green, blue, violet, pink, gray, and black— comprising the previous episode's defending champion, seven teams from the last episode’s non-advancers, and replacements for eliminated teams. Each team had three members: the original texter and two chosen teammates.

Teams race to press their buzzers; a correct answer advances them to the second round (Taranta), while a wrong answer sends them to the "Tambay (Standby) Podium." Teams on standby can return only if fewer than four teams remain in the game. Otherwise, standby teams are eliminated and return only if needed to fill spots. This round tests agility and quick thinking.

Teams advancing from the elimination round play the "Taranta Round" seated on hydraulic roller-coaster-like seats. Each player answers one question with three random answer choices within 3 seconds, while being sprayed with water and air to increase difficulty. The top two teams with the most correct answers move on. By September 2009, Manzano began reading the answer choices before each player responded.

If two teams tied, both faced a tiebreaker question to identify the odd option. Each team chose one member to buzz in. The two losing teams were eliminated and did not return next episode.

In the Diskarte round, the two remaining teams competed on mobile podiums by answering questions. Correct answers advanced members toward the final platform; the first to reach the third spot earned ₱10,000. Once there, further correct answers advanced teammates. When all reached the third stage, one final correct answer won ₱50,000 and a spot in the Jackpot round. Each team had three "Diskarte Powers" to use against opponents after correct answers, or could say "Sugod ako!" to skip using them.

- "Manigas Ka!" (Freeze!) – This power forces an opposing contestant to lose their next turn or prevents them from answering the upcoming question. It can be activated by a teammate immediately after a correct answer.
- "Pass-sagot" (Pass the Answer) – This allows a team to select one member to answer the current question. If the chosen player answers correctly, they advance one stage forward; if not, the teammate who invoked this power advances instead. This power is only usable while a question is being asked.
- "Back-to-Base" – This power sends an opposing contestant back to the starting position. It can only be used after a question has been answered correctly.

The team won ₱2,000,000 by answering 5 out of 7 questions correctly in 90 seconds. Each question began with the category, and a team member would say "Mine!" before buzzing in. After the question was revealed, the member gave an answer and said "Sure Na!" to lock it in. If unsure, they could consult the team or pass the question to another member by saying "Mine!" again. Each correct answer earned ₱10,000, and the team could pass up to twice.

=== 2020–2022: Game Ka Na Ba? (2nd incarnation) ===
On September 26, 2020, nearly 11 years after the original show ended on October 23, 2009, ABS-CBN teased its revival on Jeepney TV and the Kumu app. The reboot premiered on October 12, 2020, featuring a refreshed version of the original theme music. Notably, it became the world’s first game show played entirely on a mobile app. Players on the Kumu app answer five multiple-choice questions, with winners sharing a ₱10,000 jackpot.

The first season premiered on October 12, 2020, and concluded on January 1, 2021. Season 2 followed from January 4 to March 31, 2021, ending just before the start of the Paschal Triduum in the Philippines. Season 3 aired from April 19 to July 16, 2021, while Season 4 ran from August 23 to November 19, 2021. The fifth season launched on February 19, 2022, featuring a new format with episodes released every third Saturday.

Transmissions

Season	Premiere	Finale	Episodes
1	October 12, 2020	January 1, 2021	59
2	January 4, 2021	March 31, 2021	63
3	April 19, 2021	July 16, 2021	65
4	August 23, 2021	November 19, 2021	65
5	February 19, 2022	June 18, 2022	5

== Reception ==
Pilipinas, Game Ka Na Ba? was always a constant top-rater during its primetime run for ABS-CBN (usually taking #1 in primetime since it also became a phenomenon in the Philippines), and it was also a top-rater during its daytime run; it usually took #2 in the daytime ratings behind its lead-in show Wowowee.

=== Aftermath ===
According to an article by Philippine Entertainment Portal in October 2009, Pilipinas, Game Ka Na Ba? would return as a "seasonal" show as to the other ABS-CBN shows like Kapamilya, Deal or No Deal and The Singing Bee, though the game show's return is dubious as Manzano transferred to ABS-CBN's rival network, GMA Network. ABS-CBN also launched a new show titled It's Showtime on October 24, 2009.

== Legacy ==
=== Papaya dance ===
A meme started by Game Ka Na Ba is the "Papaya Dance". In a previous version of the show, the "Atras-Abante" round was used to select the two players who would compete for the grand prize. The first player who made it to the round danced to the tune of "Papaya", a '70s pop jazz song by Urszula Dudziak. Due to the popularity of the song, Edu Manzano released a soundtrack, which became a certified hit, and was used as part of the soundtrack of Sakal, Sakali, Saklolo. After a few months, the Papaya dance became known worldwide when it was featured on MSNBC, Reuters, and ABC's Good Morning America.

=== Taglines ===
During Aquino's reign as Game Ka Na Ba?'s host, she turned famous taglines from the show that became known expressions for Filipinos. like "Korek!" or "May Tama Ka!".

=== Reruns ===
Reruns of the show with Manzano as its host from March 2007 to October 2009 airs on Jeepney TV and also streamed on Kapamilya Online Live on Facebook and YouTube.

=== Drag Race Philippines ===
The title of Game KNB? and the line of Pilipinas, Game Ka Na Ba? was later alluded in the inaugural season of Drag Race Philippines' Snatch Game. The season 1, episode 6 of the franchise entitled "Snatch Game KNB?" references the game show with host Paolo Ballesteros asking the contestants "Pilipinas, Snatch game ka na ba?" similar to Kris and Edu's line.

== Awards ==
- 2002, 2003 & 2005 PMPC Star Awards for TV: Best Game Show Host (Kris Aquino)
- 2003-2006 PMPC Star Awards for TV: Best Game Show
- Anak TV Seal 2006, 2007, 2008 & 2009 : Most Well-Liked TV Programs
- 2007 & 2008 PMPC Star Awards for TV: Best Game Show
- 2007 & 2008 PMPC Star Awards for TV: Best Game Show Host (Edu Manzano)
- 2008 & 2009 Gawad Tanglaw Para Sa Sining At Kultura: Best Game Show
- 2008 & 2009 Gawad Tanglaw Para Sa Sining At Kultura: Best Game Show Host (Edu Manzano)
- 2007 KBP Golden Dove Awards: Best Game Show
- 2007 KBP Golden Dove Awards: Best Game Show Host (Edu Manzano)

== See also ==
- List of programs broadcast by ABS-CBN
- List of programs broadcast by Jeepney TV
- Kapamilya, Deal or No Deal
- 1 vs. 100
