= Billy Crawford =

Filipino actor (born 1982)

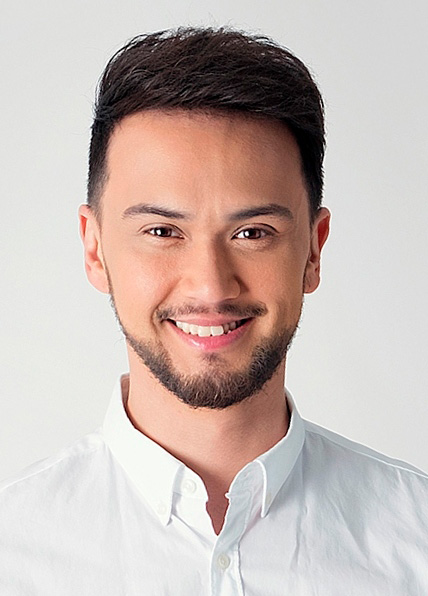
- Crawford in 2018
- Born: Billy Joe Ledesma Crawford; May 16, 1982 (age 44); Manila, Philippines
- Citizenship: Philippines; United States
- Occupations: Actor; musician; singer; comedian; dancer; television host
- Years active: 1986–present
- Spouse: Coleen Garcia (m. 2018)
- Children: 2
- Musical career
- Genres: Pop; R&B; soul; OPM
- Instruments: Vocals; guitar; piano; drums
- Labels: V2; Universal; MCA; Viva Records

Billy Joe Ledesma Crawford (born May 16, 1982) is a Filipino actor and singer. Crawford is a recipient of a NRJ Music Awards, a FAMAS Award and a special Aning Dangal award from the National Commission for Culture and the Arts (NCCA).

Crawford made his television debut as a child performer on the variety show That's Entertainment. As a child actor, he received repeated acclaim for his performances in films such as Lost Command and Sandakot Na Bala (both 1988) and television programs such as Lovingly Yours, Helen. In 1994, at age 12, Crawford left the Philippines for the U.S., enrolling at the Professional Performing Arts School, New York City; less than one year later, he was chosen to be one of Michael Jackson's back-up dancers for a performance at the 1995 MTV Video Music Awards.

Following his eventual graduation from performing arts high school, and subsequent return to the Philippines, his 2007 concert "Billy Crawford: It's Time" was staged at the Araneta Coliseum as his homecoming special. In 2022, he was announced as the grand winner of the French dance competition program Danse avec les Stars (English: "dance with the stars").

Having sold an estimated 2 million records worldwide, Crawford is among the best-selling Filipino artists of the late 20th and early 21st centuries. He released three studio albums under V2 Records, the first being his self-titled debut album. In 2002, he released his second album Ride. It was a commercial success, being certified gold in Switzerland by the IFPI and platinum in France by the SNEP. It produced his most successful single "Trackin'", which was a big chart success across Europe. It reached No. 1 in the Netherlands, peaked at No. 11 on the European Hot 100 Singles chart and sold 500,000 units in France.

== Early life and career ==
Billy Joe Ledesma Crawford was born in Manila, Philippines, to a Filipino mother from Jaro, Iloilo City, named Mayette Ledesma and an American father named Jack Crawford. He has two half-brothers.

Crawford was discovered at the early age of 3 years, singing at a bowling alley that his mother often visited. He became a series regular on an afternoon GMA Network television show called That's Entertainment under the name Billy Joe. Afterwards, he acted in various screen works such as the films Lost Command and Sandakot Na Bala and the anthology drama series Lovingly Yours, Helen, with his performances being consistently acclaimed. For his performance in the latter's episode "My Brother, My Friend" in 1988, Meg Mendoza of the Manila Standard stated that Crawford was "the most natural child actor we've seen after Jay Ilagan", though she noted that his Tagalog can be improved upon.

He attended the Imus Unida Christian School in the Philippines until his departure for the US when he was 12 and balanced both his professional acting and his studies. In the United States, he started a music career, performing mostly in the United Kingdom and France, as well as in Asia. His early career started in Dallas, Texas, where he lived and performed his singing and then moved to New York City. During this time, he legally changed his stage name to Billy Crawford. He first went to P.S./I.S. 217 Roosevelt Island Public School and then to Professional Performing Arts School in New York City with other famous professional children, such as Lee Thompson Young, Mandy Moore and Nina Sky.

In 1995, when he was 13, he landed his first professional gig as a backup dancer for Michael Jackson for his performance of "Dangerous" at the 1995 MTV Video Music Awards.

== Albums ==
=== Billy Crawford (1997–1999) ===
Crawford recorded his self-titled first album Billy Crawford (which included hits such as "Urgently in Love" and "Mary Lopez") when he was 15 years old.

=== Ride (2001–2002) ===
In 2001, "Trackin'" was the first single from the album Ride and can be deemed as the singer's most successful hit single: it peaked at number five for five weeks in France and was certified platinum. As of August 2014, it was the 74th best-selling single of the 21st century in France, with 343,000 units sold. The song reached No. 1 in the Netherlands, No. 2 in Belgium, No. 3 in Switzerland and No. 20 in Germany. In the UK, the song was released as the third single after "You Didn't Expect That" in August 2003 and reached No. 32 on the UK chart.

By April 2002, Crawford was back on the scene with his second album, Ride. This was certified gold in France (selling 100,000 copies) within just a few weeks and gold in Switzerland. The album went on to achieve platinum status in the French market (selling 300,000 copies) and a total of 600,000 copies has been sold to date. As for singles, following the success of the second track, "When You Think About Me" (over 250,000 copies sold in France), Crawford returned in September 2002 with a third single from the Ride album, "You Didn't Expect That", which went directly into the top 5 and was certified gold in December, having sold more than 250,000 copies in just a few weeks. After this grand success, he returned in 2003 with two versions of a previously unreleased track: the English version of "Someone Like You" and a special Franco-English version for France, "Me passer de toi", which stayed in the singles charts for some weeks.

=== Big City (2004–2005) ===
"3 Wishes" (2005)
The supposed third single for Big City.

"Steamy Nights" (2005)
The second single for Big City.

The album Big City was produced by some of the best producers in the American music industry such as Kovas (Ghettobeat Production), J Que (from "The Clutch"), Tricky Stewart and Laney Stewart (RedZone Entertainment), The CornaBoyz, Pale Face, Desmond Child and Stargate. He left his old company, V2 records, wanting to expand his career into something bigger.

=== Big City Tour Live (2005) ===
Big City Tour Live is the live release DVD album from Crawford. The DVD was released in France in 2005. It was directed by Michel Jankielewicz, produced by Yves El-Baze and distributed by UMG (2005) (worldwide) (DVD). The budget of this album was €150,000 (estimated).

=== It's Time (2007) ===
It's Time is the fourth studio album by Crawford. It was released in 2007 with its first single, "Like That".

=== Groove (2009) ===
Groove is the fifth studio album by Crawford. It contains re-workings of classic hits from the 1970s and 1980s.

=== Sky Is the Limit (2013) ===
Sky Is the Limit is the first EP (and sixth release) by Crawford. It features five new tracks as well as one remix and one instrumental. It was released through the independent label, Jackpot Records.

=== Work in Progress (2019) ===
In 2019, Crawford released the single "Filipina Girl" as the carrier single from the album Work in Progress. It consists of ten tracks with a bonus track featuring Marcus Davis Jr. who produced the album. He once said that the album is dedicated to his wife Coleen García who motivated him to go back to music. Work in Progress was released March 22, 2019 under Viva Records.

== Music and television career ==
Crawford had major chart success in France and other parts of Europe but did not repeat this success in the United Kingdom and the United States, although his single "You Didn't Expect That" did make the lower reaches of the UK Top 40, peaking at number 35. He also contributed a cover of the original Pokémon TV series theme song for Pokémon: The First Movie. In 2002, Crawford also appeared at a popular Filipino-American event called "Fiesta Filipina", held in San Francisco, California.

Crawford's album Big City was released in 2004 in France and Asia only. The single "Bright Lights" was unable to break into any Top 10 charts. The second single "Steamy Nights", produced by Kovas – Ghetto Beat, fared better, making the Top 40, and was featured on 7 compilations across Europe and was the first single in Germany. Crawford's music video for "Steamy Nights" was shot in Los Angeles, California, and was produced with the same people who worked on the Destiny's Child single "Lose My Breath". Actress Jenna Dewan, who was one of the main characters in the popular 2006 film Step Up, was featured as Crawford's dance partner.

Another song from the album, "Candy Store", was leaked from the album and received airplay on London radio. Thought to be a duet with Ginuwine, it is featured on the Big City album. After doing the first-ever online reality show The MSN Dance Show, his third single from the album, "3 Wishes", was canceled by his label. Crawford felt that it was time for something new and decided not to re-sign his contract with V2 Records. The same year, he voiced Dean in the 1st episode from the 3rd season of the animated TV show Totally Spies!.

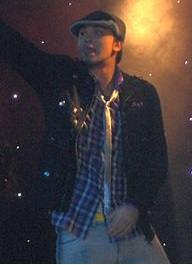
Crawford in London, November 2009

In 2006, Crawford began recording a new album which was expected to be released in 2007. In 2006, he toured during the summer with the group L5 in France and in November he was scheduled to return to his home country to shoot a film. That same year, he was recorded a cover of Super Freak by Rick James from the French animated film Asterix and the Vikings.

In 2007, Billy Crawford returned to the Philippines to host the dance reality show "MOVE: The Search for Billy Crawford's Pinoy Dancers" on GMA Network. The program aimed to select six backup dancers, known as The Movers, for his inaugural Philippine concert, 'Billy Crawford: It's Time,' held at the Araneta Coliseum. The show's main judge, known as the Move Master, was Marie Courchinoux, also called 'Maryss from Paris.' Initially, six Movers were chosen, with a seventh later added to complete the crew. The official dancers for Crawford included Darcy Godoy, JM Vergara, Aizel Moñeva, AJ Sarate, Jobel Dayrit, Daniel Agbisit, and Mich Garong. Following the successful concert, Crawford returned to the United States to pursue various projects and fulfill commitments.

In 2008, upon his return to the Philippines, Crawford signed with ABS-CBN as an exclusive artist. He became a regular on the Sunday variety show ASAP and later hosted Pinoy Dream Academy Überture, a reality search that involves the skill of singing.

In 2009, he returned to acting via Your Song Presents with his partner and fellow singer Nikki Gil. He also released his fifth studio album Groove in the Philippines as well as worldwide digital services later that year. He also hosted a former talent show, Showtime.

In 2010, he hosted Pilipinas Got Talent with fellow co-host Luis Manzano. Both of them won as Best Talent Search Program Hosts at the 24th PMPC Star Awards for TV.

From 2011 to 2020, Crawford hosted with Vhong Navarro and other hosts in the weekday variety show It's Showtime.

In 2013, he launched his initial EP, "Sky Is the Limit," under the independent label Jackpot Records, marking his return to music since 2009. On April 4, 2014, he extended his contract with Universal Records and announced plans to release a new album later that year. In 2017, during the promotion of a Soul Brothers concert featuring him, he performed his latest single, "Future," dedicated to his wife, Coleen García.

In September 2020, Crawford transferred to TV5 Network, as he hosted the Philippine version of The Masked Singer and the noontime variety show Lunch Out Loud, which later reformatted to Tropang LOL and simulcasted to Kapamilya Channel and A2Z in 2022 until its conclusion in 2023. He began hosting game show The Wall Philippines in 2021. as the latter moved to GMA Network for its second season in 2022, it also marked Crawford's return to his home network after 15 years.

He participated in the French television dance competition Danse avec les stars and won the competition with his partner, Fauve Hautot.

Crawford became part of GMA Network's adaptation of The Voice franchise in the country, as one of the coaches in The Voice Generations (2023), and The Voice Kids (2024).

== Personal life ==
In the early 2000s, Crawford was in a four-year relationship with French singer Lorie.

Crawford was in a relationship with singer-actress Nikki Gil from 2008 to 2013. The two were a prominent celebrity couple with joint projects and duets, and their split gained significant media attention.

In 2014, Crawford began dating his co-host Coleen García from It's Showtime!. The two became engaged on December 20, 2016, and married on April 20, 2018. On September 10, 2020, they welcomed their son, Amari. On April 13, 2025, Garcia announced on Instagram that she and Crawford were expecting their second child.

=== Legal issues ===
In September 2014, Crawford was involved in an incident at a Bonifacio Global City police precinct where he allegedly flew into a drunken rage, injuring a desk officer and damaging the precinct's glass door in the ensuing scuffle.

Crawford, who had no prior history of legal incidents, has since issued an apology to his fans and to the officers whom he crossed paths with, though mischief and assault charges have been filed against him.

== Discography ==
=== Albums ===
Year	Album details	Peak chart positions					Sales	Certifications
Year	Album details	BEL	FRA	GER	NL	SWI	Sales	Certifications
1999	Billy Crawford: Released: June 15, 1999; Label: V2	—	—	—	—	—		
2002	Ride: Released: July 8, 2002; Label: V2	22	7	73	53	17	FRA: 320,000–418,200	FRA: Platinum; SWI: Gold
2005	Big City: Released: April 12, 2005; Label: V2	32	12	—	—	84		PHI: Gold
2007	It's Time: Released: September 24, 2007; Label: MCA	—	—	—	—	—		
2009	Groove^{[C]}: Released: May 1, 2009; Label: Universal	—	—	—	—	—		PHI: Gold
2019	Work in Progress: Released: March 22, 2019; Label: Viva	—	—	—	—	—		
"—" denotes releases that did not chart or were not released in that country.

=== EPs ===
Year	EP details
2013	Sky Is the Limit: Released: May 21, 2013; Label: Jackpot

=== Singles ===
Year	Title	Peak chart positions									Sales	Certifications	Album
Year	Title	AUT	BEL	FRA	GER	NL	NZ	SWE	SWI	UK	Sales	Certifications	Album
1998	"Urgently in Love"	—	—	64	94	90	12	28	—	48			Billy Crawford
1999	"Supernatural"	—	—	—	—	—	—	—	—	124			Billy Crawford
1999	"Mary Lopez"	—	—	—	—	—	—	15	—	82			Billy Crawford
1999	"Pokémon Theme 2"	—	—	—	—	—	—	—	—	—			Pokémon: The First Movie Music from and Inspired by the Motion Picture
2001	"When You're in Love with Someone"^{[A]}	—	—	—	—	—	—	—	—	—			Ride
2002	"Trackin'"	55	3	5	23	1	—	33	5	32	FRA: 534,700	FRA: Platinum	Ride
2002	"When You Think About Me"^{[B]}	—	21	14	48	16	—	—	24	—	FRA: 125,000+	FRA: Gold	Ride
2002	"You Didn't Expect That"	—	13	6	82	56	—	—	23	35	FRA: 250,000	FRA: Gold	Ride
2003	"Me passer de toi (Someone Like You)"	—	36	11	—	—	—	—	28	—	FRA: 20,000+		Ride
2004	"Bright Lights"	—	2	12	—	—	—	—	46	—			Big City
2005	"Steamy Nights"	—	—	42	—	—	—	—	—	—			Big City
2007	"It's Time"	—	—	—	—	—	—	—	—	—			It's Time
2007	"Like That"	—	—	—	—	—	—	—	—	—			It's Time
2009	"Steal Away"^{[C]}	—	—	—	—	—	—	—	—	—			Groove
2009	"Human Nature"^{[C]}	—	—	—	—	—	—	—	—	—			Groove
2010	"You've Got a Friend" (featuring Nikki Gil)^{[C]}	—	—	—	—	—	—	—	—	—			Groove
2019	"Filipina Girl" (featuring Marcus Davis Jr. and James Reid)	—	—	—	—	—	—	—	—	—			Work in Progress
"—" denotes releases that did not chart or were not released in that country.

Notes

- A Song was released in the United States in 2001, and internationally in 2003.
- B Song was originally recorded by the Filipino-American girl group One Voice.
- C Album and songs were released only in the Philippines, and therefore, did not chart as there are no official albums and singles charts in the Philippines.

== Filmography ==
=== Film ===
Year	Title	Role	Notes
1988	Lost Command	David	Credited as Billy Joe Crawford
1988	Sandakot Na Bala	Jun Jun	Credited as Billy Joe Crawford
1989	Pardina at ang Mga Duwende	Bambi	Credited as Billy Joe Crawford
1989	Pahiram ng Isang Umaga	Chad	Credited as Billy Joe Crawford
1989	Bote, Dyaryo, Garapa		Credited as Billy Joe Crawford
1989	Everlasting Love		Credited as Billy Joe Crawford
1990	Kasalanan ang Buhayin Ka		Credited as Billy Joe Crawford
1990	Dine Dinero		Credited as Billy Joe Crawford
1991	Eh, Kasi Bata	Daryll	Credited as Billy Joe Crawford
1993	Taong Gubat		Billy Crawford's Last Seiko Films film
2005	Dominion: Prequel to the Exorcist	Cheche	Main role
2012	Moron 5 and the Crying Lady	Isaac Estrada	Billy Crawford's 1st Viva Films film
2013	Momzillas	Elwood del Valle	Billy Crawford's 1st Star Cinema film
2014	Moron 5.2: The Transformation	Isaac Estrada	Main role
2015	A Second Chance	Pedro Gonzales	
2015	That Thing Called Tanga Na	Baldo	
2020	Mia	Noah	

=== Television ===
Year	Title	Role	Notes
1986–1994	That's Entertainment	Himself	
1986–1992	Lovingly Yours, Helen	Himself	Guesting
1989–1993	Coney Reyes on Camera	Himself	Guesting
1997–2008	Walang Tulugan with the Master Showman	Himself	Host / Performer
2005	Totally Spies!	Dean	Original French voice
2007	Celebrity Duets: Philippine Edition	Himself	Guesting as Tessa Prieto-Valdez's duet partner
2008–2020; 2026–present	ASAP	Himself	
2008	Pinoy Dream Academy	Himself	Host
2009	Maalaala Mo Kaya	Toto	Episode "Kalendaryo"
2009	Your Song	Buboy/Brian Flores	Episode "If Your Not the One"
2010	Pilipinas Got Talent (season 1)	Himself	Host
2010	Wowowee	Himself	Guest co-host
2010	Panahon Ko 'to!: Ang Game Show ng Buhay Ko	Himself	Host with Luis Manzano
2011	Pilipinas Got Talent (season 2)	Himself	Host
2011–2018; 2019; 2023; 2025–present	It's Showtime	Himself	Host/Guest performer/Judge in Tawag ng Tanghalan
2011	Star Power	Himself	Judge
2012	Pilipinas Got Talent (season 3)	Himself	Host
2013	Pilipinas Got Talent (season 4)	Himself	Host
2014	Aquino & Abunda Tonight	Himself	Guest host
2014	The Singing Bee	Himself	Guest host
2015	Your Face Sounds Familiar (season 1)	Himself	Host
2015	Sabado Badoo	Himself; credited as Billy Joe Crawford	Cameo footage featured
2015	Your Face Sounds Familiar (season 2)	Himself	Host
2015	Celebrity Playtime	Himself	Host (episodes 1–7)
2016	Pilipinas Got Talent (season 5)	Himself	Host
2016	Pinoy Boyband Superstar	Himself	Host
2017	Your Face Sounds Familiar: Kids (season 1)	Himself	Host
2017	Little Big Shots	Himself	Host
2018	Pilipinas Got Talent (season 6)	Himself	Host
2018	I Can See Your Voice	Himself	Guest
2018	Your Face Sounds Familiar: Kids (season 2)	Himself	Host
2019	World of Dance Philippines	Himself	Judge
2019	Search for the Idol Philippines	Himself	Host
2019	Your Moment	Himself	Judge
2020–2023	Lunch Out Loud / Tropang LOL	Himself	Host
2020–2025	Masked Singer Pilipinas	Himself	Host
2021–2022	The Wall Philippines	Himself	Host
2022	Danse avec les stars 2022 (Dancing with the Stars France Season 12)	Himself	Competitor
2023	TiktoClock	Himself	Guest host
2023	Fast Talk with Boy Abunda	Himself	Guest
2023	The Voice Generations	Himself	Judge
2023; 2024	All-Out Sundays	Himself	Guest performer
2024	The Voice Kids (season 6)	Himself	Judge
2026	Your Face Sounds Familiar (season 4)	Himself	Guest performer
2026	Mask Singer (France, season 9)	Himself	Competitor and winner

In 2007, Crawford received an offer to do a dance film called Back Down. He was also supposed to read for a film with Whoopi Goldberg, but these Hollywood productions were pushed back. Crawford's life story has also been shown on the Philippine television drama show Maalaala Mo Kaya.

== Awards and nominations ==
Award	Year	Category	Nominee(s)/work(s)	Result	Ref.
Eastwood City Walk of Fame	2007	Celebrity Inductee	Billy Crawford	Won	
Myx Music Award	2008	Favorite Urban Video	Like That	Won	
NRJ Music Award	2002	Best Newcomer of the Year	Billy Crawford	Nominated	
NRJ Music Award	2003	International Male Artist of the Year	Billy Crawford	Won	
PMPC Star Awards in Music	2019	Male Recording Artist of the Year	Filipina Girl	Nominated	
PMPC Star Awards in Television	2010	Best Talent Program Host	(with Luis Manzano) for Pilipinas Got Talent)	Won	
Wish Music Awards	2018	Wishclusive R&B Performance of the Year	Future	Nominated	
