= List of The Wall Philippines episodes =

The Wall Philippines is a Philippine television game show broadcast by TV5 and GMA Network. The show is based on the American game show The Wall. It is hosted by Billy Crawford.

== Series overview ==
Season	Episodes	Originally released	
Season	Episodes	First released	Last released
1	26	March 13, 2021	September 11, 2021
2	15	August 28, 2022	December 4, 2022

== Episodes ==
Color key

The contestants won at least ₱1,000,000.
The contestants left with the larger possible amount.
The contestants left with the smaller possible amount.
The contestants left with nothing at all.

=== Season 1 (TV5) ===
Episode	Contestants	Guaranteed Payout Contract			Final Bank Total	Contract Decision
Episode	Contestants	Free Fall Bank	Correct Answers (Bonus)	Total Offer	Final Bank Total	Contract Decision
1	Dennis and Ian Hong	₱165,331	4 (₱80,000)	₱245,331	₱615,540	Accepted
2	Fr. Dakila Ramos and Fr. Roniel Sulit	₱125,215	3 (₱60,000)	₱185,215	₱835,192	Rejected
3	Arth Bryan Celeste and Fredrich Jenkin Dylim	₱150,033	4 (₱80,000)	₱230,033	₱0	Rejected
4 (Note: This episode aired as a celebrity charity special. Loyzaga played for Ang Bahay Parola, while Reyes played for the medical expenses of Frankie Rivera III, the father of her friend.)	Diego Loyzaga and Cristine Reyes	₱120,107	6 (₱120,000)	₱240,107	₱2,620,220	Rejected
5	Katherine Vinson and Kimberly Ilag	₱55,422	4 (₱80,000)	₱135,422	₱130,623	Accepted
6	Denver Jamon and Danrev Dimaculangan	₱95,100	4 (₱80,000)	₱175,100	₱0	Accepted
7	Mark Onofre and Gretchell Paredes	₱65,135	2 (₱40,000)	₱105,135	₱599,918	Rejected
8 (Note: This episode aired as a celebrity charity special. The pair played for the Philippine Foundation for Breast Care, Inc. (Kasuso Foundation).)	Bayani Agbayani and Wacky Kiray	₱95,423	4 (₱80,000)	₱175,423	₱0	Rejected
9 (Note: This episode aired as a celebrity charity special. The pair played for Save the Children Philippines.)	Coleen Garcia and Ria Atayde	₱135,021	3 (₱60,000)	₱195,021	₱984,809	Rejected
10 (Note: This episode aired as a celebrity charity special. The pair played for Make-A-Wish Foundation Philippines.)	Jay R and Kris Lawrence	₱85,441	5 (₱100,000)	₱185,441	₱170,750	Rejected
11	Sunshine Guimary and Rosanna Roces	₱30,033	5 (₱100,000)	₱130,033	₱199,819	Rejected
12	Sam Concepcion and Marco Gumabao	₱130,205	3 (₱60,000)	₱190,205	₱0	Rejected
13	Kim Molina and Jerald Napoles	₱100,413	4 (₱80,000)	₱180,413	₱0	Rejected
14	John Estrada and Long Mejia	₱100,413	3 (₱60,000)	₱160,413	₱0	Rejected
15	Ella Cruz and Julian Trono	₱40,273	3 (₱60,000)	₱100,273	₱250,049	Rejected
16	Roex Pestaño and Kristofferson Santuile	₱35,213	6 (₱120,000)	₱155,213	₱1,285,553	Rejected
17	Randy Santiago and Dennis Padilla	₱180,103	4 (₱80,000)	₱260,103	₱1,880,035	Accepted
18	Anthony Del Prado and Methos Licayan	₱65,242	4 (₱80,000)	₱145,242	₱0	Accepted
19	Troy Montero and Aubrey Miles	₱90,234	2 (₱40,000)	₱130,234	₱1,399,896	Rejected
20	Ritchelle Anne and Rochelle Anne San Pedro	₱75,112	4 (₱80,000)	₱155,112	₱700,125	Rejected
21	Daniel Matsunaga and Fabio Ide	₱50,314	4 (₱80,000)	₱130,314	₱0	Rejected
22	Rye Cunanan and Mickey Agaton	₱115,312	2 (₱40,000)	₱155,312	₱0	Accepted
23	Maui Taylor and Andrea del Rosario	₱45,462	2 (₱40,000)	₱85,462	₱0	Rejected
24	Acey Parasdas and Kikay Rosagas	₱55,293	4 (₱80,000)	₱135,293	₱0	Accepted
25	Alodia Gosiengfiao and Ashley Gosiengfiao	₱75,252	3 (₱60,000)	₱135,252	₱0	Rejected
26	Daryl Ong and Wency Cornejo	₱40,235	4 (₱80,000)	₱120,235	₱0	Rejected

=== Season 2 (GMA Network) ===
Episode	Contestants	Guaranteed Payout Contract			Final Bank Total	Contract Decision
Episode	Contestants	Free Fall Bank	Correct Answers (Bonus)	Total Offer	Final Bank Total	Contract Decision
1 (Note: This episode aired as the celebrities played for their chosen charities. The pair played for GMA Kapuso Foundation.)	Miguel Tanfelix and Ysabel Ortega	₱65,342	3 (₱60,000)	₱125,342	₱1,995,042	Rejected
2 (Note: This episode aired as the celebrities played for their chosen charities. San Agustin played for the down syndrome, while Diaz played for PAWSsion Project.)	Arra San Agustin and Shaira Diaz	₱100,000	2 (P40,000)	₱140,000	₱799,900	Rejected
3 (Note: This episode aired as the celebrities played for their chosen charities. Guidicelli played for Hero Foundation, while Bozico played for ARK.)	Matteo Guidicelli and Nico Bolzico	₱70,121	1 (₱20,000)	₱90,121	₱0	Accepted
4 (Note: This episode aired as the celebrities played for their chosen charities. Bautista played for Kythe Foundation, Inc., while Lopez played for Strays Worth Saving.)	Sanya Lopez and Kakai Bautista	₱70,143	4 (₱80,000)	₱150,143	₱1,144,935	Rejected
5 (Note: This episode aired as the celebrities played for their chosen charities. Super Tekla played for GMA Kapuso Foundation, while Boobay played for the indigenous Aetas in Angeles, Pampanga.)	Boobay and Super Tekla	₱85,012	2 (₱40,000)	₱125,012	₱0	Rejected
6 (Note: This episode aired as the celebrities played for their chosen charities. The pair played for Mental Health Awareness Foundation.)	Kylie Verzosa and Marco Gumabao	₱165,213	3 (₱60,000)	₱225,213	₱420,102	Rejected
7 (Note: This episode aired as the celebrities played for their chosen charities. The pair played for the Senior Citizens in Barangay Tambo Balagbag, Indang, Cavite.)	Joey Marquez and Winwyn Marquez	₱240,125	3 (₱60,000)	₱300,125	₱290,215	Rejected
8 (Note: This episode aired as the celebrities played for their chosen charities. The pair played for the Child Protection.)	Abdul Raman and Shayne Sava	₱155,134	1 (₱20,000)	₱175,134	₱0	Rejected
9 (Note: This episode aired as the celebrities played for their chosen charities. Marta played for GMA Kapuso Foundation, while Clemente played for Mabuhay Deseret Foundation.)	Yasser Marta and Prince Clemente	₱210	2 (₱40,000)	₱40,210	₱65,199	Rejected
10 (Note: This episode aired as the celebrities played for their chosen charities. Guimary plays for Pawssion Project Foundation Inc.. Pangilinan played for A Child's Dream Foundation)	Sunshine Guimary and Candy Pangilinan	₱170,114	2 (₱40,000)	₱210,114	₱69,982	Accepted
11 (Note: This episode aired as the celebrities played for their chosen charities. The pair played for Angat Buhay Foundation.)	Prince Carlos and Carlo San Juan	₱65,121	2 (₱40,000)	₱105,114	₱0	Rejected
12 (Note: This episode aired as the celebrities played for their chosen charities. The pair played for Bahay Aruga.)	Ken Chan and Rob Gomez	₱50,215	None	₱50,215	₱300,086	Rejected
13 (Note: This episode aired as the celebrities played for their chosen charities. Yu played for Hospicio de San Jose while Tan played for Bahay Pag-Ibig.)	Tyrone Tan and Dustin Yu	₱95,312	2 (₱40,000)	₱135,312	₱0	Rejected
14 (Note: This episode aired as the celebrities played for their chosen charities. The pair played for Khyte Foundation.)	Kim Molina and Jerald Napoles	₱155,200	3 (₱60,000)	₱215,200	₱549,889	Rejected
15 (Note: This episode aired as the celebrities played for their chosen charities. The pair played for Down Syndrome Association of the Philippines, Inc.)	Andrea Torres and Max Collins	₱35,004	4 (₱80,000)	₱115,004	₱1,709,193	Rejected
