= Just the Beginning (One Voice album) =

Studio album by One Voice
- Released: April 20, 1999; July 9, 2000 (re-issued version)
- Genre: R&B, pop, freestyle
- Label: Kamikaze
- Producer: James "Jae-E" Earley

One Voice chronology
Just the Beginning (1999)	Sincerely Yours (2001)

Alternative cover
- 2000 re-issued cover

Just the Beginning is the debut album by One Voice. It was released in 1999 under the Kamikaze label and sold 100,000 copies in the United States and Philippines where it went gold. The album was re-released in 2000, due to the success of single "When U Think About Me". This is the only album to feature original member Aimee Castillo who later left the group in 2001 to further her education.

== Track listing ==
1. "Mad About U"
2. "All Day All Nite"
3. "Lovin' U"
4. "When U Think About Me"
5. "Always on My Mind"
6. "All That 2 Me"
7. "Boyfriend"
8. "Here I Go (Falling in Love Again)"
9. "Never Leave Your Side"
10. "Before U Go Tomorrow"
11. "Down with Me"
12. "All Day All Nite" (Kamikaze Mix)
13. "Do We Stand a Chance" (hidden track)

=== 2000 re-issued version ===
1. "Mad About U"
2. "When U Think About Me"
3. "Always on My Mind"
4. "All That 2 Me"
5. "Boyfriend"
6. "Down with Me"
7. "Never Leave Your Side"
8. "All Day All Nite" (Kamikaze Mix)
9. "Here I Go (Falling in Love Again)"
10. "Lovin' U" (DJ Pleez Remix)
11. "Before U Go Tomorrow"
12. "Do We Stand a Chance"
13. "When U Think About Me" (Kamikaze Mix)
14. "Here I Go" (Kamikaze Mix)
15. "Boyfriend" (Venus Remix)

== Singles ==
1. "All Day All Nite" (October 13, 1998)
2. "When U Think About Me" (December 7, 1999)
3. "Boyfriend" (August 15, 2000)
4. "Never Leave Your Side" (2000)
