= Brooklyn High School of the Arts =

Public school in New York City

Coordinates: 40°41′02″N 73°58′49″W

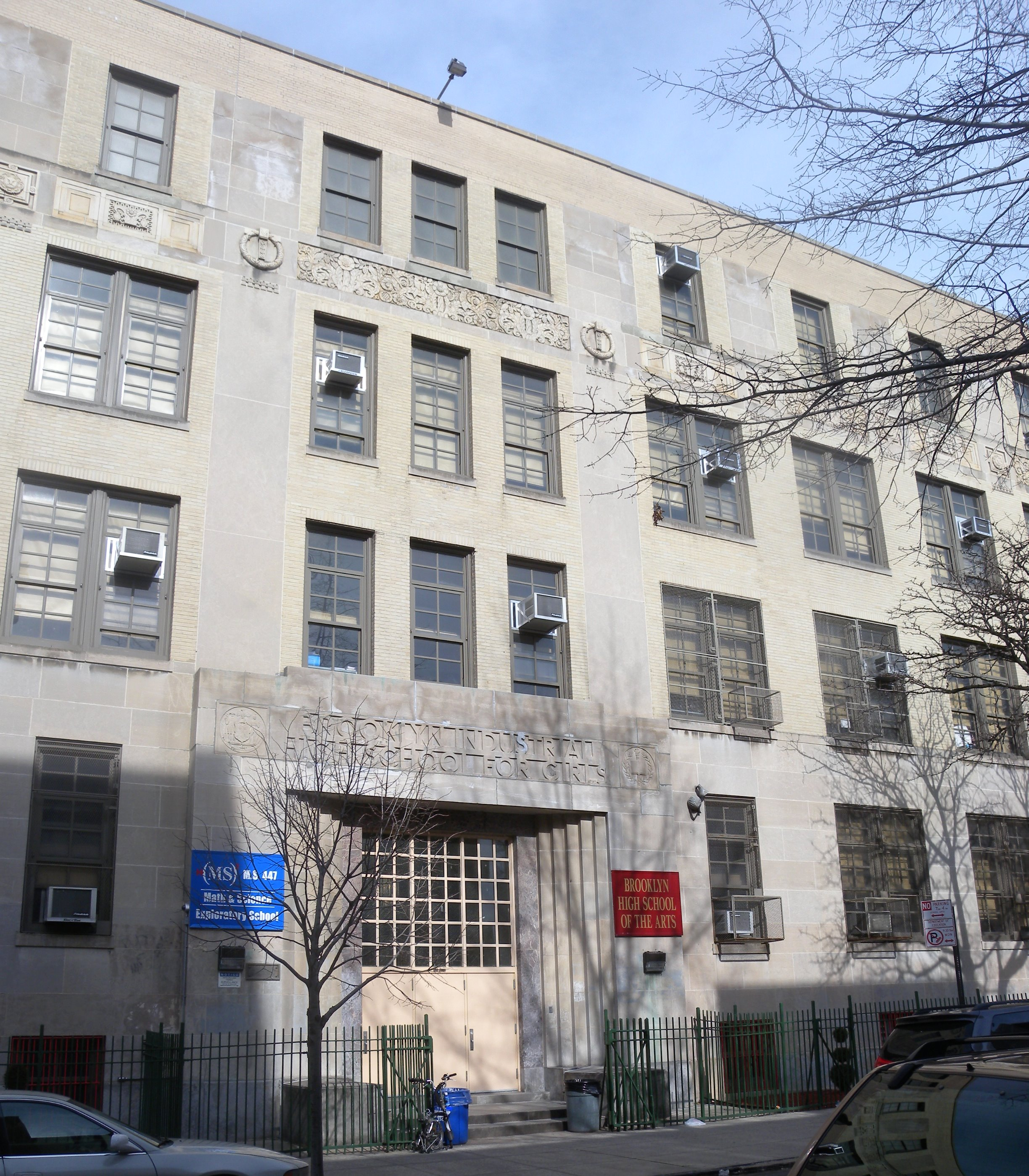
- 345 Dean Street; Brooklyn, New York 11217

Information
- Type: Public
- Established: 2000
- Principal: Daniel Vecchiano
- Enrollment: 725
- Website: https://www.brooklynartshs.nyc/

Brooklyn High School of the Arts ("Brooklyn Arts") is a New York City public high school located in Boerum Hill in Brooklyn. It provides pre-college courses and a pre-conservatory arts program. The school has majors including Fine Art (visual and design), Dance (performing arts), Instrumental Music (performing arts), Theater (performing arts) and Vocal Music (performing arts). Students must audition before the teaching staff for their chosen major.

The school had its first graduating class in June 2004. Hip-hop recording artist Jeannie Ortega was also part of the first graduating class. It has a student population of about 900 students in grades 9 through 12. The school has extracurricular activities such as a thespian society, peer mediation, guitar club, anime club, chess club, student advisory council, art clubs, newspaper, Gay-Straight Alliance and the National Honor Society. The school offers sports such as volleyball, track, double dutch, basketball, badminton. The principal is Daniel Vecchiano.

The high school also offers summer internships via the Preservation Arts program. Students can intern at various architecture, construction, and engineering firms around New York.

The school offers programs such as:

- Advanced Via Individual Determination. This program trains educators to prepare students for success in high school, college, and a career. Students can apply during their freshman year and if accepted, can participate in the program until their senior year.

- The school has a partnership with the Metropolitan Opera House and gives it free access to screening of live shows each month. Examples of past operas shown are "Die Zauberflöte" and "L’Elisir d’Amore". Students, faculty, staff, and locals can go into the schools auditorium and watch the projections of the show.

- The Brooklyn Arts Lecture Series brings in professionals from different backgrounds into the school to sit down interview style and share their journey of how the achieved success. Past presenters include the dancer and choreographer Dwana Smallwood and jazz vocalist Marianne Solivan.

-New York Cares S.A.T. Program offers students free tutors to help prepare for the S.A.T.s. This program allows students to practice S.A.T.s.

Brooklyn arts is one of the fifteen schools in New York City to become an AP Capstone affiliate. The Advanced Placement classes offered are in United States history, English language and composition, statistics, world history, human geography, biology, environmental science and psychology.

== See also ==
- Education in New York City
