= The Wall Philippines =

Philippine television game show

- Title card
- Genre: Game show
- Based on: The Wall by: Andrew Glassman; LeBron James
- Written by: Evette Borromeo; Sherwin Buenavida; Emmanuel Magsino; Bebeth Santos
- Directed by: Bobet Vidanes
- Presented by: Billy Crawford
- Opening theme: "Behind the Wall"
- Ending theme: "Wall of Will" and "Trophies"
- Composer: Michael Lord
- Country of origin: Philippines
- Original language: Tagalog
- No. of seasons: 2
- No. of episodes: 41 (list of episodes)

Production
- Executive producers: Vicente Del Rosario, Jr.; Robert P. Galang; Ana Carla Rodriguez-Duenas
- Producers: Vincent Del Rosario; Valerie S. Del Rosario; Veronique Del Rosario-Corpus
- Production locations: New Frontier Theater, Araneta City, Cubao, Quezon City
- Camera setup: Multiple-camera setup
- Running time: 60 minutes
- Production companies: Cignal Entertainment; Viva Television; GMA Entertainment Group (2022)

Original release
- Network: TV5 (2021); GMA Network (2022)
- Release: March 13, 2021 – December 4, 2022

The Wall Philippines is a Philippine television game show broadcast by TV5 and GMA Network. The show is based on the American game show The Wall. Hosted by Billy Crawford, it premiered on March 13, 2021 on TV5. The second season premiered on GMA Network on August 28, 2022 on the network's Sunday Grande sa Hapon line up. The show concluded on December 4, 2022, with a total of two seasons and 41 episodes.

== Gameplay ==
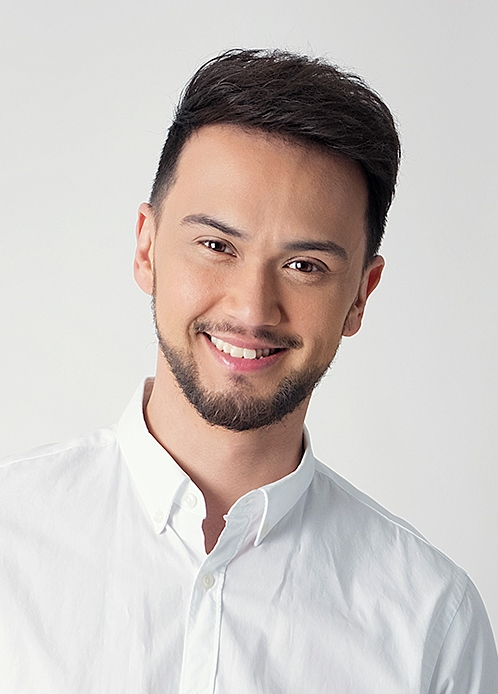
Billy Crawford served as the host.

The Wall is a four-storey high (37 ft) pegboard, similar to a pachinko game or bean machine. The bottom of the board is divided into 15 bins marked with various Philippine peso amounts; eight of these range from ₱1 to ₱100 and remain constant throughout the game, while the others have higher values and increase from round to round. Balls can be put into play from seven numbered "drop zones" on the top edge of the board, directly above the seven centermost money slots.

A team of two contestants plays each game, attempting to bank as much money as possible by correctly answering multiple choice questions and landing balls in high-value slots. Balls turn green for correct answers and red for incorrect answers. Green balls dropped on the board will add to the team's bank, while red balls dropped on the board will subtract from it. Throughout the game, the bank has a floor of ₱0. The game has a potential top prize of ₱12,374,994 (later ₱11,949,994 in the second season).

=== Round 1: Free Fall ===
In Free Fall, the team is asked a series of five questions, each with two answer choices. After each question is asked, three balls are simultaneously released from drop zones 1, 4, and 7. The team must select one answer and lock it in before the first ball crosses the white line just above the bins. If the team's answer is correct, the balls turn green and their values are added to the team's bank. If the team answers incorrectly or fails to lock in an answer, the balls turn red and their values are subtracted from the team's bank.

If the team's bank balance is zero at the end of this round, the game ends immediately and they leave without any winnings. Otherwise, their earnings become part of a guaranteed payout to be offered to them at the end of the game.

The highest amount that a team can bank in this round is ₱375,000 in the first season; this was later increased to ₱750,000 for the second season.

The values on the board range from ₱1 to ₱25,000 (later ₱50,000), and are arranged as follows:

| ₱1 | ₱5,000 | ₱100 | ₱20,000 | ₱10 | ₱10,000 | ₱1 | ₱25,000 ₱50,000 | ₱1 | ₱10,000 | ₱10 | ₱20,000 | ₱100 | ₱5,000 | ₱1 |

=== Round 2 ===
At the start of the second round, the contestants are separated from each other for the rest of the game. One enters an isolation chamber behind The Wall, while the other remains onstage. Two green balls are played simultaneously, dropped from the two zones chosen by the onstage player. Three multiple choice questions are then played, each with three answer choices. The onstage player is shown only the answers to each question and must decide which zone to use, based on how confident he/she is that the isolated player can answer correctly. The question and answers are then presented to the isolated player. After he/she responds, the video feed is cut off, the correct answer is revealed, and the balls change their color correspondingly. A correct answer turns the balls green, while an incorrect answer turns the balls red. The balls are dropped from the chosen zone. A green ball adds the value of the bin it lands on to the team's bank, while a red ball deducts it. The isolated player is not told which of his/her answers are correct or given any information on the team's bank.

The onstage player is offered an opportunity to "Double Up" on the second question and "Triple Up" on the third. These options allow the onstage player to play two or three balls from the selected drop zone instead of one, respectively. After the third question, if the banked total is at least ₱1 more than the number of green balls played at the start of the round, an equal number of red balls are played simultaneously from the same zones.

After the third question, if the banked total is at least ₱3 (as the least that could be lost from two red balls is ₱2), two red balls are dropped simultaneously from the same zones that were chosen for the initial two green balls. The maximum amount that a team can bank in this round is ₱1,999,998. For the second season, the maximum slot value was reduced to ₱150,000, lowering the maximum for this round to ₱1,199,998.

The values on the board range from ₱1 to ₱250,000 (later ₱150,000), and are arranged as follows:

| ₱1 | ₱5,000 | ₱100 | ₱10,000 | ₱10 | ₱25,000 | ₱1 | ₱50,000 | ₱1 | ₱100,000 ₱75,000 | ₱10 | ₱125,000 ₱100,000 | ₱100 | ₱250,000 ₱150,000 | ₱1 |

=== Round 3: Million Round ===
The gameplay proceeds as in Round 2, but each of the three questions now has four answer choices. In addition, four green and four red balls are played at the start and end of the round respectively, and are dropped one at a time, rather than simultaneously. The "Double Up" and "Triple Up" options are available as before. The maximum amount that a team can bank in this round is ₱9,999,996.

The values on the board range from ₱1 to ₱1,000,000, and are arranged as follows:

| ₱1 | ₱50,000 | ₱100 | ₱100,000 | ₱10 | ₱200,000 | ₱1 | ₱300,000 | ₱1 | ₱400,000 | ₱10 | ₱500,000 | ₱100 | ₱1,000,000 | ₱1 |

=== Final Decision ===
After the third question in Round 3, the host sends the isolated player a contract, and he/she must sign it or tear it up. Signing the contract gives up the team's bank in favor of a guaranteed payout, equal to the Free Fall winnings plus an additional ₱20,000 for every question answered correctly in Rounds 2 and 3. If the isolated player tears up the contract, the team receives whatever is left on their bank instead. After the four red balls have dropped in Round 3 and the final bank is calculated (or after the last question if there is less than ₱5 banked), the isolated player returns to the stage to reveal his/her decision. Only at this point does he/she learn the number of correct answers given, the payout total, and the team's final bank.

The maximum possible guaranteed payout in the first season is ₱495,000, obtained by scoring ₱375,000 in Free Fall and answering all questions correctly in Rounds 2 and 3. The maximum possible bank total in first season is ₱12,374,994, obtained by answering every question correctly, using every Double Up and Triple Up option, having every green ball drop into the highest-valued slot, and having the six mandatory red balls each drop into a ₱1 slot. For the second season, the maximum possible guaranteed payout and bank totals are ₱870,000 and ₱11,949,994, respectively.

== Accolades ==
Accolades received by The Wall Philippines
| Year | Award | Category | Recipient | Result | Ref. |
|---|---|---|---|---|---|
| 2021 | Asian Academy Creative Awards | Best Adaptation of an Existing Format | The Wall Philippines | Nominated | |
