= Bobet Vidanes =

Filipino television director

Member of the Pililla Municipal Council
- In office June 30, 2022 – June 30, 2025

Personal details
- Born: Norbert Gabriel Vidanes; October 11, 1965 (age 61) Philippines
- Party: Lakas–CMD (since 2024)
- Other political affiliations: PDP–Laban (until 2024)
- Spouse: Cory Valenzuela
- Children: Chad Vidanes; Ara Vidanes; Kobi Vidanes
- Occupation: Director
- Known for: It's Showtime; Wowowee; Magandang Tanghali Bayan; Pilipinas, Game KNB?; Kapamilya, Deal or No Deal

Norbert Gabriel "Bobet" Vidanes (born October 11, 1965) is a Filipino television director and politician who served as a municipal councilor of Pililla, Rizal from 2022 to 2025. As director, he is known for his works such as It's Showtime, Wowowee, Magandang Tanghali Bayan and Pilipinas, Game KNB?. He was also an actor for It's Showtime Holy Week Drama Specials during Holy Week of every year from 2013 to 2019. He is also the director of the Philippine adaptation of the Got Talent franchise, Pilipinas Got Talent, Idol Philippines, and Kapamilya, Deal or No Deal.

== Personal life ==
Vidanes was married to Cory Vidanes, the chief operating officer for broadcast of ABS-CBN Corporation. They have three children, Kobi, Ara, and Chad.

== Career ==
Vidanes is a director of many ABS-CBN shows. Vidanes created and directed Pilipinas, Game KNB?, a long-running game show in the Philippines airing from 2001 to 2009. He also directed Kapamilya, Deal or No Deal, the Philippine adaptation of the Deal or No Deal franchise.

In 2005, Vidanes also co-directed a musical comedy variety show Wowowee with co-director Johnny "Mr. M." Manahan.

In 2009, Vidanes created the variety show It's Showtime wherein it became commercially successful for it garnered high audience shares during its debut. During the show's run, Vidanes had an issue with one of the show's host, Vice Ganda wherein there was a hint that Vidanes might resign from the show. However, both Vidanes and Vice Ganda denied their conflict and also Vidanes' resignation.

In 2010, Vidanes directed the Philippine version of the Got Talent entitled as Pilipinas Got Talent.

In 2016, Bobet is also recently as a new actor for For The Win an It's Showtime Holy Week Drama Specials 2016 which he play a basketball coach.

In 2017, Bobet returns as an actor for an It's Showtime Holy Week Drama Specials 2017 this time, which he play a tricycle driver for Anne Curtis for Anne's role as a Guardian Angel.

In 2019, Vidanes directed the Philippine version of the Idols entitled as Idol Philippines.

In 2020, Vidanes resigned as director of It's Showtime after 11 years and was replaced by Boyet Baldemor as the new director of the show.

In 2021, following his departure from It's Showtime, Vidanes moved to Viva Entertainment and directed The Wall Philippines and 1000 Heartbeats: Pintig Pinoy. He would later become one of the main directors of the Brightlight Productions-produced show Lunch Out Loud.

== Filmography ==
=== Television (Directing) ===
Year	Title	Credit
2001-2009	Pilipinas, Game KNB?	Director and Creator
2001–2002	Maalaala Mo Kaya	Director
2001–2003	Magandang Tanghali Bayan	Director
2005–2009	Wowowee	Director (co-director with Johnny Manahan)
2006–2016	Kapamilya, Deal or No Deal	Director
2008–2015	The Singing Bee	Director
2009–2020	It's Showtime	Director
2010	Twist and Shout	Director
2010–2018	Pilipinas Got Talent	Director
2010	Panahon Ko To: Ang Game Show Ng Buhay Ko	Director
2011	The Price Is Right	Director
2019	Idol Philippines	Director
2021–2023	Lunch Out Loud	Program Development Director
2021–2022	The Wall Philippines	Director
2021	1000 Heartbeats: Pintig Pinoy	Director

=== Television (Acting) ===
Year	Title	Role
2016	For The Win: Its Showtime Holy Week Drama Special 2016	Basketball Coach
2017	Guardian Angel: Its Showtime Holy Week Drama Special 2017	Tricycle Driver

=== Film ===
Year	Title	Credit
2002	Jologs	Game KNB? contestant
