= Trackin' =

2001 single by Billy Crawford

Single by Billy Crawford

from the album Ride
- Released: October 4, 2001
- Length: 4:10
- Label: V2
- Songwriters: Adam Anders; Anders Barrén; Nikki Hassman; Jany Schella
- Producers: Anders Barrén; Jany Schella

Billy Crawford singles chronology
"When You're in Love with Someone" (2001)	"Trackin'" (2001)	"When You Think About Me" (2002)

Audio sample
- Billy Crawford - "Trackin'": file; help

"Trackin'" is a song by Filipino-American singer Billy Crawford. It was the first single released from his second studio album, Ride (2002). The song reached number one in the Netherlands, number three in Switzerland, number five in France, and number 20 in Germany. As of August 2014, it was the 74th-best-selling single of the 21st century in France, with 343,000 units sold. In the United Kingdom, the song was released as the third single in August 2003. "Trackin'" is his highest-charting single there, reaching number 32 on the UK Singles Chart.

== Track listings ==
European CD single

1. "Trackin'" (album version) – 4:10
2. "Trackin'" (extended mix) – 7:15
- An enhanced version featuring the "Trackin'" video was also released.

European maxi-CD single

1. "Trackin'" (album version) – 4:10
2. "Changing My Color" – 4:09
3. "Trust Me" – 3:54
4. "Trackin'" (extended mix) – 7:15

European 12-inch single

A. "Trackin'" (extended mix) – 7:15
B. "Trackin'" (album version) – 4:10

UK CD1

1. "Trackin'" (radio edit) – 3:31
2. "That's the Way Love Is" (radio edit) – 4:16
3. "When You're in Love with Someone" (radio edit) – 4:26

UK CD2

1. "Trackin'" (Wookie remix) – 4:21
2. "Trackin'" (DND full vocal edit) – 5:36
3. "Trackin'" (Almighty radio edit) – 3:44
4. "Trackin'" (video edit) – 3:49
5. "Trackin'" (video—new version) – 3:53

UK DVD single

1. "Trackin'" (radio edit audio) – 3:31
2. "The Making of Trackin'" (video) – 5:30

== Credits ==
- Backing vocals by Adam Anders and Jany Schella
- Bass by Anders Barrén
- Guitar by Anders Barrén
- Mixed by Tony Maserati
- Produced by Anders Barrén and Jany Schella, Stargate

== Charts ==
=== Weekly charts ===
Chart (2001–2003)	Peak position
Austria (Ö3 Austria Top 40)	55
Belgium (Ultratop 50 Flanders)	22
Belgium (Ultratop 50 Wallonia)	3
Europe (Eurochart Hot 100)	11
France (SNEP)	5
Germany (GfK)	23
Netherlands (Dutch Top 40)	1
Netherlands (Single Top 100)	1
Scotland Singles (OCC)	39
Sweden (Sverigetopplistan)	33
Switzerland (Schweizer Hitparade)	5
UK Singles (OCC)	32
UK Indie (OCC)	5

=== Year-end charts ===
Chart (2001)	Position
France (SNEP)	29

Chart (2002)	Position
Belgium (Ultratop 50 Wallonia)	43
Europe (Eurochart Hot 100)	36
France (SNEP)	37
Netherlands (Dutch Top 40)	32
Netherlands (Single Top 100)	24
Switzerland (Schweizer Hitparade)	45

== Certifications ==
Region	Certification	Certified units/sales
Belgium (BRMA)	Gold	25,000^{*}
France (SNEP)	Platinum	500,000^{*}
^{*} Sales figures based on certification alone.

== Release history ==
Region	Date	Format(s)	Label(s)	Ref.
France	October 4, 2001	CD	V2	
Australia	October 28, 2002	CD	V2	
United Kingdom	August 18, 2003	CD; DVD; cassette	V2	
