= Jeannie Ortega =

American singer (born 1986)

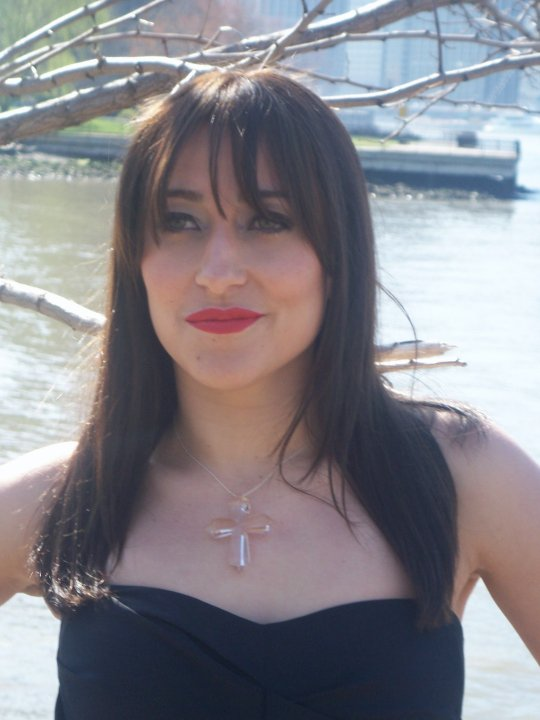
- Jeannie Ortega in 2007

Background information
- Born: Jeannette Ortega; November 19, 1986 (age 39); Bushwick, Brooklyn, New York, U.S.
- Occupations: Singer, dancer, songwriter, writer, journalist
- Instruments: Vocals, guitar
- Spouse: Renn Law (m. 2009)
- Children: 1
- Years active: 2003 - present
- Labels: Hollywood Records (2002 - 2007); AIC Records (2012 - present)
- Website: jeannieo.com

Jeannette "Jeannie" Ortega (born November 19, 1986) is an American singer, songwriter, dancer, writer, and journalist. She made her recording debut in 2006 with the album No Place Like BKLYN at the age of 19. The album featured the single "Crowded", which reached the Billboard Hot 100.

== Biography ==
Jeannie Ortega was born in Bushwick, Brooklyn, New York and is of Puerto Rican descent. While attending Brooklyn High School of the Arts, Ortega's song "Got What It Takes" was placed on the soundtrack for the 2003 comedy Love Don't Cost a Thing, and the song "Future Is Clear" appeared on the TV show soundtrack for That's So Raven!. She was quickly signed with Hollywood Records in 2002 and released her debut single "It's R Time" in October 2005. The song later appeared on the Freedom Writers soundtrack in 2007.

Ortega spent several years on the tween pop Radio Disney circuit of radio interviews, live mall shows, and other promotional activities as she worked on her debut album in 2005. In 2006, Ortega followed "It's R Time" with the urban-pop single "Crowded" the single quickly became a mainstream pop hit, eventually peaking in the top twenty-five of the Billboard chart. On September 12, 2006, Ortega's debut album No Place Like BKLYN was released, two weeks later the album entered the Billboard Top Heatseekers chart at number-one. On July 17, Ortega appeared on an episode of One Life to Live.

In July 2006, Ortega joined Rihanna as the opening act for her world tour. I admire her so much, Rihanna said of Ortega. She's a sweetheart and she is so grateful to be on tour with me and that's what I love. She's gonna kill it. Ortega followed that tour with the "Lo Maximo de la Musica National Tour" alongside Frankie J, Luis Fonsi, Nina Sky and Orishas. Following the tour, she was dropped from Hollywood Records.

She appeared at the Music Unites benefit on March 17, 2010, speaking about her forthcoming album.

Ortega has since become a Christian artist and signed with AIC Records. On April 26, 2011, Jeannie released her debut EP New Day. Jeannie Ortega released her sophomore album Perfect Love on January 30, 2012. Ortega released her third album Love Changed Me on November 1, 2016.

=== Personal life ===
Ortega married Renn Law on December 27, 2009. Jeannie and Renn now live in Orlando, Florida. The couple run their own church named Most High King Ministries. Jeannie Ortega suffered three miscarriages. On September 27, 2021, Jeannie and Renn welcomed their son Elionaijah Law.

=== Writing ===
On February 2, 2021, after the COVID-19 pandemic began, Ortega released her debut book What Is Happening to Me?: Discern and Defeat Your Unseen Enemy. She signed with Baker Publishing Group. Ortega writes as a journalist for The Christian Post.

== Filmography ==
- 2006 - Step Up Girl Singer #3

== Discography ==
=== Albums ===
- 2006 - No Place Like BKLYN (August 1, 2006)
- 2012 - Perfect Love (January 31, 2012)
- 2016 - Love Changed Me (November 1, 2016)

=== Singles ===
- 2005 - "It's R Time" (featuring Gemstar, N.O.R.E., Big Mato) (No Place Like BKLYN)
- 2006 - "Crowded" (featuring Papoose) (No Place Like BKLYN)
- 2006 - "So Done" (No Place Like BKLYN)
- 2008 - "A Girl Like That" Lucas Prata featuring Jeannie Ortega
- 2010 - "Beautiful Day"
- 2010 - "Strong"
- 2013 - "Imperfection" (Feat. Righteous Rebel) (Perfect Love)

== EPs ==
- "New Day" (April 26, 2011)
- "Road To 31" (2018)

== Writings ==
- What Is Happening to Me?: Discern and Defeat Your Unseen Enemy (2021)

== See also ==
- Puerto Rican Americans
