= Pooh (comedian) =

Filipino actor and comedian (born 1974)

- Born: Reynold Garcia; December 15, 1974 (age 51); Laoang, Northern Samar, Philippines
- Other name: Pooh
- Notable work: Banana Sundae; Banana Split

Comedy career
- Genres: Impersonations, skits

Reynold Garcia (born December 15, 1974, in Laoang, Northern Samar), known professionally as Pooh, is a Filipino actor, comedian, impersonator, singer and host. He is known for starring in the comedy gag show Banana Split. He is also known for impersonating boxer and politician Manny Pacquiao.

He was the 2006 and 2007 awardee for Aliw Award best male stand-up comedian. He was again nominated in 2008.

== Career ==
Pooh first worked at the now-defunct Nota'Kwela, a comedy bar in Caloocan. He then moved to Music Box and later to Jazz Café. He was eventually scouted by Andrew del Real of The Library.

Pooh had guested on GMA Network's SiS and in a sequence on an afternoon show of the network. He claims it was ABS-CBN that gave him the opportunity to get known to a larger audience.

The comedian became a part of the Banana Split cast; he did skits and made impersonations as part of the show. By 2013, he became known for his impersonation of Manny Pacquiao. In additional to his stint with ABS-CBN, he occasionally receives assignments abroad as a comedian and impersonator.

In the same year, he expressed contentment with his involvement in the show and wouldn't mind if he were offered additional roles or not, and would not rather force a role onto himself which he considered as not his forte. He said that he would rather not become as popular as Vice Ganda, as he wouldn't be able to handle the fame.

== Comedic style ==
Pooh says that his forte in comedy is more on impersonations and skit-based. He said he is not comfortable using insults in doing comedy, saying that he may not handle it well and end up offending someone.

== Filmography ==
=== Film ===
- Annie B. - Bar Comedian (2004)

=== Television ===
- John en Shirley - Giovanni (2006)
- Love Spell: "Click Na Click" - Manilyn (2006)
- Pangarap na Bituin - Berns Bautista (2007)
- I Love Betty La Fea - as Eda (2009)
- Banana Split/Banana Sundae - Various roles (2009–2020)
- Shall We Dance? Co-host (2009)
- Ruffa & Ai - Himself (2009)
- Florinda - George (2009)
- Kung Tayo'y Magkakalayo - Barry (2010)
- Your Song: Love Me, Love You - Guest Actor (2010)
- Pilipinas Win Na Win - Co-host with Pokwang (2010)
- Juanita Banana - Sandra (2010)
- Gandang Gabi, Vice! - Himself (2011)
- Muling Buksan Ang Puso - Xenon (2013)
- Ningning - Jewel (2015)
- FPJ's Ang Probinsyano - Wanda (2016)
- Stay-In Love Dencio (2020)
- Niña Niño Andie (2021)
- Eat Bulaga! (GMA Network) - Himself (2021)
- Open 24/7 (GMA Network) - Papu (2023)

=== Guest appearances ===
- ASAP
- It's Showtime
- Kapamilya, Deal or No Deal
- Pilipinas, Game KNB?
- Quizon Avenue
- The Singing Bee
- Wowowee
- SiS
- Rainbow Rumble

== Awards and nominations ==
Awards and nominations
Year	Award giving body	Category	Nominated work	Results
2006	Aliw Award	Best Male Stand-up Comedian	—N/a	Won
2007	Aliw Award	Best Male Stand-up Comedian	—N/a	Won
2008	Aliw Award	Best Male Stand-up Comedian	—N/a	Nominated
2009	23rd PMPC Star Awards for TV	Best Comedy Actor	Banana Split	Won
2011	25th PMPC Star Awards for TV	Best Comedy Actor	Banana Split	Nominated
2013	27th PMPC Star Awards for TV	Best Comedy Actor	Banana Split	Nominated
