= Happy Yipee Yehey! =

Philippine noontime variety show

- Latest title card of Happy Yipee Yehey!
- Genre: Variety show
- Directed by: Johnny Manahan; Arnel Natividad
- Creative directors: Edgar "Bobot" Mortiz; Willy Cuevas
- Presented by: Rico J. Puno; Randy Santiago; John Estrada; Toni Gonzaga; Pokwang
- Narrated by: Bob Novales
- Country of origin: Philippines
- Original language: Filipino
- No. of episodes: 302

Production
- Executive producer: Marvi Gelito
- Production locations: Studio 4, (2011) Studio 3 (2011–12) and Dolphy Theatre (Studio 1; 2012), ABS-CBN Broadcasting Center, Quezon City, Philippines; AFP Theater, Quezon City, Philippines (2012)
- Running time: 2½ hours (Weekdays); 2¾ hours (Saturdays)

Original release
- Network: ABS-CBN
- Release: February 12, 2011 – February 4, 2012

Happy Yipee Yehey! is a Philippine television variety show broadcast by ABS-CBN. Hosted by Randy Santiago, John Estrada, Rico J. Puno, Pokwang and Toni Gonzaga, It aired on the network's PrimeTanghali lineup from February 12, 2011 to February 4, 2012, replacing Pilipinas Win Na Win and was replaced by It's Showtime. The noontime show with a stadium launch at the Ynares Sports Arena and the show formally had its live finale at the AFP Theater with the "My Girl" grand finals.

== Hosts ==
=== Final main hosts ===
- Randy Santiago (2011–12)
- John Estrada (2011–12)
- Toni Gonzaga (2011–12)
- Rico J. Puno† (2011–12)
- Pokwang (2011–12)

=== Final co-hosts ===
- Bentong† (2011–12)
- Bianca Manalo (2011–12)
- John Prats (2011–12)
- Matteo Guidicelli (2011–12)
- Melai Cantiveros (2011–12)

=== Featuring ===
- HYY Hot Stuff (Dancers) (2011–12)
- Joy Cancio (Choreographer) (2011–12)
- DJ Ace Ramos (2011–12)
- SexBomb Girls (2011–12)

=== Former co-hosts ===
- Jobert Austria (2011)
- Sam Milby (2011)
- Jason Francisco (2011)
- Mariel Rodriguez (2011)

== Development ==
The existence of the show was first revealed by Willie Revillame on the January 26 episode of Willing Willie. Revillame voiced his ten-minute resentment over close friends and ex-Magandang Tanghali Bayan co-hosts Santiago and Estrada for accepting a noontime show with ABS-CBN, Revillame's former station with whom he has legal issues. Two days later on January 28, ABS-CBN's Push announced a new variety show in the works in which Willie was referring to. On February 4, TV Patrol officially announced the show with the complete cast list. Also announced, the show's dancers will be choreographed by Joy Cancio, manager of the SexBomb Girls of Eat Bulaga!. First, the show was earlier reported to premiere on February 5, then on February 7 along with The Price Is Right before setting the date to February 12. It's Showtime returned to its original timeslot in the morning. On February 6, a dry run of the show was held. Creative director Willy Cuevas also revealed the name of two segments: "Hole-logs" and "Kitang-kits".

Various cast members have presented Happy Yipee Yehey. Sam Milby left because of his upcoming film projects such as Forever and a Day. Jobert Austria left the show to focus both on Banana Split, Usapang Lalake of Studio 23 and presently in the new weekly comedy series Toda Max. Jason Francisco of the popular Melason tandem later joined the co-hosts along with his partner Melai Cantiveros as the replacement of Austria but eventually left due to commitments on other TV programs such as Banana Split and Angelito: Batang Ama. Former Pilipinas Win Na Win hosts Pokwang and Rico J. Puno also later joined the main hosts.

A few hours later after a broadcast of TV Patrol, ABS-CBN released an official statement, stating that the show will air its final episode on February 4, 2012, with its "My Girl" grand finale.

== Segments ==
=== Final segments ===
==== My Girl ====
Presented Mondays, Wednesdays and Fridays, three female contestants ranging from 16 to 20 years old battle out showing off their lives, and talents in pageant-style while answering the question of the day. The criteria used are 50% for beauty, 25% for personality, and 25% for audience impact. The contestant with the highest score for that day wins ₱10,000 and will advanced to the weekly finals where the winner of that Saturday will advance to the monthly finals. The runners-up win ₱5,000. In the monthly finals, the rules and criteria are the same except one question will be asked by a celebrity panel of judges, and one bonus question by the hosts. All of the prizes and consolation prizes were sponsored by YSA botanica 2 in 1 skin soap with kojic acid. With six competitors in the monthly finals, the winner(s) will win ₱30,000 and advance to the grand finals for a chance to win ₱1,000,000, and a Star Magic contract, and a brand new car sponsored by BNY jeans, the one who will win the car must get the highest text votes on the grand finals and one texter will have a chance to win P50,000 via electronic raffle. The grand finals will be on February 4, 2012, the show's final episode.

==== Who's The Girl? ====
Played Tuesdays, Thursdays and Saturdays, the celebrity player of the day must guess who's the one of three girls as the true "Certified Girl" by showing her fashion style, voice and talent. If the player correctly identifies the "Certified Girl", he/she will win P15,000. If the player identifies the fake girl, the "Certified Pa-Girl", the "Certified Girl" will win P15,000.

==== 3-in-1 Tanging Hinga Mo ====
Played weekdays, three groups of three players will be chosen to play the game and the group who has the longest breathe after singing a certain song will get an Extreme Magic Sing, a MSE pangkabuhayan showcase, and ULOAD Package and will advanced to the jackpot round. The non winners will also receive P3,000. The jackpot round has the same mechanics as the elimination round the group must have a long breathing technique which in every second of breathing is equivalent to P1,000 and if you can get it up to 90 seconds you will win up to P200,000.

==== Susi ng Kapalaran ====
Three groups of ten contestants will battle out in an Elimination Round. The hosts will clue into a specific word, and the first three/four contestants from each group that successfully answers the correct word will pick one key from up to ten keys and advance to the Battle Round.

The ten contestants that earned their place with a key will battle each other in a Battle Round. The contestants need to simply answer a trivial question given by the hosts. The contestant that answers correctly has the opportunity to take a key from another contestant. If a contestant does not have any keys in play, they are automatically eliminated. The contestant who earns a key in a round cannot play for another key must skip the next round. The first contestant who holds three or four keys in play will advance to the Jackpot Round in which they can win P500,000, a brand new Jeepney, and P1,000,000.

The Jackpot Round will consist of the contestant's three or four keys in play, plus the six or seven keys not in play. A host will offer money amounts to buy their keys out of their game. When a contestant decides their keys to keep and sell for the jackpot, they must use the kept keys now to open vaults containing their prizes. There are three vaults to choose from: The Happy Vault, Yipee Vault, and Yehey Vault. The contestant must now decide which key to use to open only one vault. Once they decide, the host will play the key in the vault. The vault should light up as red first, then blue, and if the contestant is lucky, a yellow light will flash resulting in a jackpot win. However, if both red and blue closes and the "Maling Susi" landed, this signifies that the key does not work and is out of play. A contestant is allowed to use another key in the same vault as well. Also, the host will offer money amounts to the contestant if they are unsure that the vault will open until they accept or decline as a final answer.

==== Feeling Genius ====
Played Saturdays, two celebrity players (defending champion vs. new player) will fight each other. The player who won every week is considered as defending champion and will play next game. The format was used during the Grand Finals of the predecessor, "Batang Genius". Each Question consists of 1, 2 or 3 points. One point is equivalent to one step. Each player will have 3 atras powers to move a leading player backwards. The player who reach the winning spot (12 steps) will win the game.

=== Discontinued segments ===
Discontinued segments of Happy Yipee Yehey!
Year	Name	Description
2011	Hole-logs	Two groups of five start off having each of their leaders answer a yes or no question. The first group to give the right answer has the power to pick its own hole first for the duration of the game. Then the groups picks its hole to which they are going to jump on. The group that won the question round picks its hole first. The groups picks a person from their group to jump on the hole, if the hole stays close the group gets a point meaning the group that jumped on the hole that opened lost the round. The first group to get two points wins and advances to the jackpot round. During the jackpot round the group picks which hole they think will stay close when they jump on it, if they guessed correctly they win ₱50,000.
2011	Lunch-A-Funny-Taym	This segment originally from Magandang Tanghali Bayan focuses on sitcom skits toward a specific show.
2011	Muk-Happy Yipee Yehey!	Random audience can participate in this segment and can win up to ₱4,000. Each contestant must make funny/enthusiastic facial expressions for the words "Happy", "Yipee" and "Yehey".
2011	Happy Word	Every day, co-host Bentong features a daily "word" which home viewers can text to win ₱10,000, cellphone load, plus a featured showcase. Viewers can also text the five words featured for the whole week (from Monday to Friday) to win ₱50,000 and a featured showcase.
2011	Kitang-kits	Three curtained panels entitled "Happy", "Yipee", and "Yehey" hold various random objects but only one is correct for a certain clue. A host will say a clue about an item in one of the boards. In the first format, two groups of three contestants competed within their group with a face-off round following. In the final format, five people would compete against each other to find the hinted item. The person who correctly finds the correct item will win ₱10,000 and advance to the jackpot round. In the jackpot round, the person gets a chance to win ₱50,000. Five items listed on the video wall must be found within sixty seconds in order to win the jackpot. If he/she successfully finds all five items, they win the jackpot.
2011	Sa-Poll Ng Bayan	Played every Mondays, Wednesdays, and Fridays, three teams of five players get to compete for a chance to win ₱500,000. In the elimination round, the hosts will ask a question given to one hundred people. Contestants must line up to a podium in which they think is the top answer of the barangays. However, the hosts will note if they should line up on the 1st top answer (or 2nd, 3rd, etc.), and the teams do not necessarily have to line up on the same answer. The contestants lined up on the correct top answer advance and will continue in last man standing format. The last contestant standing wins ₱20,000 and advances to the jackpot round with their team. It's just like Family Feud In the jackpot round, five polls answered by barangays will be given to the five contestants of their team. They must answer what they think is the top answer of each poll. If their answer makes it to the top five list, they will get the number of points (people who answered the same). If the team gets to 110 points, they win a showcase. If the team reaches 200 points, they win the top prize of ₱500,000. Otherwise if none of those goals are reached, each first top answer correctly answered is worth ₱10,000.
2011	Waka Waka Bida	Played every other Saturdays, three random bystanders from the daily location of Ikaw Ang Bida perform in a dance contest to Shakira's hit single "Waka Waka (This Time for Africa)". Each contestant dances a sample to the song for thirty seconds. At the end, all three contestants dance head-to-head in a showdown. The best contestant chosen by the audience's popularity wins ₱5,000.
2011	Happy Ka-Family	Derived from the team vs. team segments of Magandang Tanghali Bayan such as Hula Bira, two teams of the main hosts and co-hosts are assembled and are given a challenge to perform. Five audience members will get a cash prize if their team wins the challenge.
2011	Sakto!	Played weekdays in the beginning of the show, ten random people from the audience are chosen who dance the best to the show's newest song "Sakto". The hosts will ask a question to the ten contestants. The answer is a number between 1 and 100. Each contestant must choose the closest/exact number to the answer without going over. The contestant who chooses the number closest to the exact correct number wins ₱5,000.
2011	Toot Mo Na!	Six random studio contestants (six celebrities on Saturdays) dancing to the show's latest single ("Na Na Na Na") will compete against each other in a Red light/Green light formatted game. A host would use a large remote warning one or multiple contestants when to stop or start dancing to the song. The last contestant standing will win a MyPhone.
2011	Ikaw Ang Bida	Two randomly chosen contestants will compete against the clock and complete three levels to win up to ₱50,000. Each contestant will be placed in either the Red or Yellow Team (Bidang Pula/Bidang Dilaw). In level one, they have three minutes to finish a challenge, and the contestant with the fastest time earns ₱10,000. In level two, contestants must perform a challenge related to knowledge and must finish in two minutes. The fastest one will answer first and the slowest next. The contestant with the correct answer will earn ₱10,000. In level three, there will be one final challenge that has to be performed in one minute thirty seconds to win the final prize of ₱30,000. At the end of three levels, the contestant who has accumulated the most money in their bank will win the amount. Otherwise ₱5,000 as a consolation prize if cannot wins in any rounds. If in case a draw, in both teams will equally half the cash prize in any three rounds. Five random bystanders of the winning team will also win a MyPhone. This segment is the Philippine franchised version of 2waytraffic's "Who will Stand Out From the Crowd?".
2011	Ilaw ng Tahanan	Every Saturday, a good samaritan visibly showing good deeds becomes featured on the show itself to be rewarded, and share positive moments with the hosts.
2011	Pera o Bayong	Played Tuesdays and Thursdays, the classic nostalgic "Pera O Bayong" returned once again because of its constant popularity from predecessor variety shows such as Magandang Tanghali Bayan and Wowowee. In the current elimination round entitled "Asul, Berde o Pula", a total of a hundred contestants chosen from the audience entrance before the show compete in a matira-matibay (last man standing) game of luck. The contestant must simply line up to either the asul (blue), verde (green), or pula (red). A wheel consisting of the different colored spokes will spin and the spokes will flip so the contestants cannot find out the color landed. When the wheel comes to a complete stop, the wheel will re-flip and show the landed color. The last contestant left standing advances to the jackpot round. The winner of the elimination round has a chance to win ₱200,000, a brand new jeepney sponsored by W.L. Foods, and ₱1,000,000 in the jackpot round. The contestant may choose one of nine bayongs to choose. The wheel used in the elimination round reverts to a jackpot round wheel with special spokes. The first part of the wheel has numbers one to four. The landing number is how many spins the contestant may be able to spin in the next part. The second part of the wheel has cash prizes from ₱20,000 to ₱40,000. The cash prizes landed on the wheel will be added to the contestant's total offer. Lastly, the contestant has sixty seconds to decide to go home with pera (cash) or continue the game with bayong (box). The bayongs revealing 0,000,000 signify that the bayong has no value, while a bayong with 1,000,000 signifies one million pesos; a picture of a jeepney pasted with ,000,000 signifies the jeepney; and lastly 200,000 signifies two hundred thousand pesos. Previous/retired bayongs offered in the segment were 400,000 signifying four hundred thousand pesos. If a contestant chooses with pera, the contestant will leave with the total offer he/she accepted regardless of what is in the bayong. If a contestant chooses bayong, the contestant must forfeit the total offer given and will win whatever is in the bayong. The previous elimination round used from March 5 to April 14, 2011, incorporated a question and answer format. In round one, nine chosen from a pool of (up to) fifty contestants chosen from themed auditions get to compete for a spot for round two. Three contestants will compete against each other in three separate groups. The hosts will ask a question. A contestant can buzz in when they think they have the right answer. If their answer is wrong, other contestants may steal. The first contestant to buzz in with the correct answer will move on to round two. In round two, the three final contestants left standing will have a chance to go to the jackpot round. Again, the hosts will ask a question and the contestant that has the correct answer has a right to choose one of nine different bayongs; "Happy", "Yipee", and "Yehey" in red/green/blue colored bayongs. One by one the bayongs will be chosen when someone answers a question correctly. The first contestant to successfully answer three questions will advance to the jackpot round with their three chosen bayongs. The three bayongs chosen by the contestant in the elimination round were carried in this round. The contestant can choose one of the bayongs hoping it will contain the jackpot prize.
2011	One Time, Big Time!	Played Weekdays, two random bystanders from the daily location of Tanging Hinga Mo and one or two from studio has an opportunity to win ₱50,000. Each contestant has one chance to successfully complete a challenge. If the challenge is won, the contestant wins ₱50,000. If lost, the contestant will still get a ₱5,000 consolation prize.
2011	Happy Yipee Awooh!	Played every Saturdays of October (except 22nd/rescheduled to 23rd), the contestants (whether Solo or a Group), will battle for the best Halloween costume. The best of the week advanced to the October 31 finals where the winners took home P50,000.
2011	Tag-Ulan Ng Papremyo	Played weekdays, the two players who won in the "Nasaan Na-Na-Na-Na" game face off in a guessing game to win their jackpot cash prize. Co-host Bentong would help the contestants catch the cash prize of the day in a cash tank containing P100,000 in peso bills. The cash caught in thirty seconds would be the cash prize that the players have to guess. Each player will have one guess at the cash prize. The player closest to the actual value of the cash prize would win P20,000. If they guess the correct amount, they win its amount. In addition to its relation of the same-named ABS-CBN network contest, each player will have a home partner that will share the same winnings.
2011	Happy Ka-Family: Kuha Mo?!	Played weekdays, two teams (Mighty Rats vs. Guranggutans) play against each other in a word association guessing game. Each team is composed of two or three hosts, one guest player and one studio audience member. Each team has three minutes to play, and a team member has ten seconds to guess the word while one representative will serve as the answer. Team members must avoid saying the root word, English/Tagalog, or the answer. The first team to make ten points wins and five audience members will receive ₱1,000 each.
2011	Miss Kasambahay	Presented Tuesdays and Thursdays, two auditioned caretakers with the personality and talents compete in a pageant-style competition. The format of the segment shares many similarities with the show's main pageant, "My Girl". The winner(s) of the day will win P10,000 and advance to the monthly finals, the runners-up will go home with P5,000. This is ended on December 3, 2011, when the Grand Finals is aired on that date.
2011	Nasaan Na-Na-Na-Na	Played Tuesdays and Thursdays, ten blindfolded players must direct themselves to find two "objects of the day". The first two players to find it will win a MyPhone and will battle for the face off round the one who will win the face off will win additional P2,000 and will advance to "Maligayang Cash-Ko" jackpot round.
2011	Maligayang Cash-Ko	Played Tuesdays and Thursdays, and sponsored by BNY jeans and Hammerhead, the contestant who won in the "Nasaan Na-Na-Na-Na" game will choose from 5 box from A-E which contains different sizes of umbrellas extra small, small, medium, large, and extra large. after picking the umbrella the contestant will now have the chance to win up to P100,000 by collecting 100 peso bills inside a capsule for 30 seconds. While all of the studio audience will guess the amount of the money collected by the contestant by writing it on a board and the one who will get the nearest amount will take home the same amount of the collected money of the contestant.
2011-12	Batang Genius	Played Saturdays, students consisting of Grade 5 and 6 compete against each other in a trivial game show for the chance to win P1,000,000 and a college scholarship. The contestants to answer two points the fastest would advance to the next heat championship round. The bottom three contestants that do not make the cut will battle out in an elimination on the next episode for a second chance spot. It ended on January 7, 2012, when the Grand Finals was held.

== Happy Yipee Yehey! "Nananana!": The Album ==
Happy Yipee Yehey! "Nananana" : The Album

Compilation album by HYY Hosts
- Released: November 12, 2011
- Recorded: 2011
- Genre: Soundtrack
- Label: Star Music
- Producers: ABS-CBN Film Productions, Inc. Marvi Gelito (executive)

The debut album composed of seven music tracks and the bonus tracks (Minus One) featuring the Happy Yipee Yehey! Casts was released.

Year	Album title and Singles Released	PARI Certification
2011	Happy Yipee Yehey! "Nananana": The Album: Nananana; I Swing Mo; No Boypren, No Problem; Matapos Man Ang Kailanman; Mahalin Ka Ng Totoo; Merry Christmas and a Happy Yipee Yehey; Happy Yipee Yehey Theme Song	Gold

== Special episodes ==
=== Tours ===
- Lingayen, Pangasinan (April 30, 2011)
- Dammam, Saudi Arabia (December 9, 2011)

== Awards and nominations ==
- 2011 Anak TV Seal Awardee (Most Favorite TV Programs) - Nominated
- 25th PMPC Star Award For TV (Best Variety Show) - Nominated
- 2011 Golden Screen Awards (Outstanding Variety Show) - Nominated
- 2011 Ateneo de Manila University Dangal ng Bayan Awards (Best Noontime Show) - Won

== Ratings ==
Happy Yipee Yehey! registered low ratings ranging from 8 to 10% while its rival show, Eat Bulaga! registered higher ratings ranging from 18 to 24% and sometimes hits the 30% mark. Its final episode, however, rated 17.3% but still failed to beat EB's 23.7%

== See also ==
- List of programs broadcast by ABS-CBN
- MTB
- Wowowee
- It's Showtime
- Pilipinas Win Na Win
