= The Price Is Right (Philippine game show) =

- Title card
- Genre: Game show
- Created by: Bob Stewart
- Directed by: Bobet Vidanes (ABS-CBN)
- Presented by: Dawn Zulueta; Kris Aquino
- Announcer: Jefferson Utanes; Michael Knight; Peter Musñgi; Marc Logan; Richard Hardin; Richard Herrera
- Opening theme: Australian Version by Tweed Harris (2001–02); American Version by Edd Kalehoff (2002, 2011)
- Country of origin: Philippines
- Original language: Filipino
- No. of episodes: 116

Production
- Production locations: Studio 3, ABS-CBN Broadcasting Center, Quezon City, Metro Manila, Philippines
- Running time: 45 minutes
- Production companies: ABC Entertainment Department (2001–02); ABS-CBN Studios (2011); Pearson Television (2001–02); Fremantle (2002, 2011)

Original release
- Network: ABC
- Release: November 25, 2001 – December 8, 2002
- Network: ABS-CBN
- Release: February 14 – August 13, 2011

Related
- The Price Is Right

The Price Is Right is a Philippine television game show broadcast by ABC and ABS-CBN. The show is based on the American game show of the same title. Originally hosted by Dawn Zulueta, it aired on ABC from November 25, 2001, to December 8, 2002, and was replaced by Ispup Atbp.. The show moved to ABS-CBN from February 14 to August 13, 2011, replacing Shoutout! and Precious Hearts Romances Presents: Alyna was replaced by Junior MasterChef Pinoy Edition. Kris Aquino serve as the final host.

== Overview ==
The two versions are nearly identical to the template set by the original US series (i.e. One Bid (P1,000 for perfect bid), pricing games, two Showcase Showdowns, and a Showcase round) with some exceptions. Both versions also use models of both genders, as the hosts of the two versions are female.

The ABC version featured six contestants, three competing in each of the two Showcase Showdowns. The winners of each Showcase Showdown competed in the Showcase portion. Initially, the Australian format (1981 onwards) was used, involving the alternate guessing of the price of the showcase and the winner rearranging the Showcase items in correct order from cheapest to the most expensive. The more familiar American format was used later in the ABC version's run. This version aired only on Sundays.

The ABS-CBN version initially involved only four contestants, two competing in each of the two Showcase Showdowns. The winners of those two Showdowns then competed in a third, one-spin-only Showdown to determine who competed in the Showcase round. This round used the British/European format, involving the choice of a range (two each of ₱10,000 and 20,000, three ₱30,000 squares, and one each of ₱40,000 and 50,000) and bidding on one Showcase to be within the chosen range without going over the actual price.

Later, the show involved only three contestants competing in one Showdown to determine who played in the Showcase round. In addition, each contestant was partnered with two other players who won money if the main contestant won a pricing game. Initially airing on weekdays, it was moved to Saturdays due to its low ratings.

The ABS-CBN version also used the US version's music package for its run (alongside a few original music cues), whereas the ABC version used original music. The ABS-CBN also used the theme from the British version with Joe Pasquale, which played as the wheel spun during the Showcase Showdown, and the first non-afternoon show to use Studio 3 at the aftermath of Wowowee's cancellation, taking over from Pilipinas Win Na Win.

== List of pricing games used in the Philippine versions ==
=== ABC version ===
- Any Number
- Balance Game
- Cliff Hangers
- Clock Game
- Cover Up
- Danger Price
- Double Prices
- Easy as 123
- Hi Lo
- Hole In One
- Joker
- Let 'Em Roll
- Money Game
- Most Expensive
- One Right Price
- Pick-A-Number
- Pick-A-Pair
- Plinko
- Push Over
- Secret X
- Shell Game
- Squeeze Play
- Shopping Spree
- That's Too Much!

=== ABS-CBN version ===
- Double Prices
- Easy as 1 2 3
- Five Price Tags
- Golden Road
- Hi Lo
- Hole In One
- It's In the Bag
- Let 'Em Roll
- One Right Price
- One Wrong Price
- Punch-A-Bunch
- Race Game
- Secret X
- Take Two

== See also ==
- List of TV5 (Philippine TV network) original programming
- List of programs broadcast by ABS-CBN
