= Love Is Only in the Movies =

- Genre: Romantic comedy Drama
- Created by: Heart Yngrid
- Directed by: GB Sampedro; Richard I. Arellano
- Starring: Zanjoe Marudo; Mariel Rodriguez
- Opening theme: "Way Back Into Love" by Sam Milby and Toni Gonzaga
- Country of origin: Philippines
- Original language: Filipino
- No. of episodes: 10

Production
- Executive producer: Mavic Holgado Oducayen
- Running time: 30-45 minutes
- Production company: LMD Unit COP Unit

Original release
- Network: ABS-CBN
- Release: February 1 – February 12, 2010

Love Is Only in the Movies is a 2010 Philippine television drama romance series broadcast by ABS-CBN. The series is based on the Filipino pocket book novel of the same title created by Heart Yngrid. The series is the fifth installment of Precious Hearts Romances Presents. Directed by GB Sampedro and Richard I. Arellano, it stars Zanjoe Marudo and Mariel Rodriguez. It aired on the network's Hapontastic line up and worldwide on TFC from February 1 to February 12, 2010, replacing Precious Hearts Romances Presents: My Cheating Heart and was replaced by Precious Hearts Romances Presents: The Substitute Bride.

== Plot ==
The film narrates the story of Sheye (Mariel Rodriguez), a certified movie fanatic who spent her younger years with her grandmother re-enacting famous movie scenes together. Due to unexpected circumstances, she grew up using her acting skills not to pursue a showbiz career but to become a professional impostor, fabrication specialist and a reality actress rolled into one. In one of her projects, she met Xander (Zanjoe Marudo), a certified playboy who does not believe in love.

== Synopsis ==
The series begins with Sheye and her grandparents, with her grandfather dying soon after. It is later shown that Sheye works as an extra for films and lives with her grandma. She also has a part-time job that is... an impostor. Her next job is to act as a prostitute and to get Xander, a director and playboy, and bring him back to his ex-girlfriend who instructs to leave Xander in the motel room and then Sheye's job unfortunately she doesn't show up, leaving Xander alone thinking Sheye has escaped stealing all his money. Sheye now has the money, her grandma is rushed to the hospital and needs to go under surgery, Sheye thinks to use the money. She then has another customer, the customer asks her to act as the lost daughter of her brother who has diabetes so that he can be well. Sheye then does her job, knowing Xander is the son of the customer, they encounter each other, Xander thinking that Sheye is an impostor and that no one can be sure if she is really his cousin, he then falls in love with Sheye so does Shey fall in love with him. Sheye's grandma visits Sheye in their customer's house seeing the customer's brother and confronts him that why did he abandon his daughter which turns out true, the series end Sheye and Xander discover that they are not blood-related.

== Cast ==
=== Main cast ===
- Zanjoe Marudo as Xander
- Mariel Rodriguez as Sheye

=== Supporting cast ===
- Wendy Valdez as Queenie
- Andrei Felix as Dom
- Mico Palanca as Dennis
- Kristel Moreno as Liz
- Regine Angeles as Raya
- Flora Gasser as Lola Senda
- Jong Cuenco as Manuel
- Timmy Cruz as Alejandra

=== Special participation ===
- Noemi Oneiza as young Shiogan
- Bugoy Cariño as young Xander
- Randolf Stamatelaky as Roy
- Auriette Divina as Alice

== See also ==
- List of programs broadcast by ABS-CBN
- List of ABS-CBN Studios original drama series
- Precious Hearts Romances Presents
