= Heart Yngrid =

- Born: Irene Ballatan; March 28, 1981 (age 45) Philippines
- Occupation: Romance Author

Website
- www.heartyngrid.com

Heart Yngrid is a Filipino romance author for Precious Hearts Romances known for her novel series Drop-dead Playboys and St. Catherine University. Two of her novels titled Love Is Only In The Movies and Love Me Again have been made as TV series on ABS-CBN's Precious Hearts Romances Presents.
