= Janelle Jamer =

Filipina TV host, singer, actress, and comedian

- Born: Marianel Saluria Jamer; November 16, 1984 (age 41); Philippines
- Occupations: TV host singer actress comedian songwriter
- Years active: 2004–2007; 2009–2021
- Awards: PMPC Star Awards Best Female TV Host 2007, Inding-Indie Best Independent Singer and Composer 2014

Marianel S. Jamer, popularly known by her screen name Janelle Jamer (born November 16, 1984), is a Filipina TV host, singer, songwriter, actress, performer, and comedian. She was notable for being one of Willie Revillame's co-hosts, along with Iya Villania and Kat Alano in the daily noontime show Wowowee from 2005 to 2007. Being in ABS-CBN and Wowowee immediately shot her to fame. She became popular not only nationally but also internationally, with TFC viewers all over the world. With such charisma and charms, everyone fell in love with not just her looks and beautiful legs but also her personality.

== Career ==
Janelle made her debut on the big screen in 2006, starring on the movie "Kapag Tumibok ang Puso (Not Once, But Twice) with Bong Revilla, Lara Quigaman and Ms. Ai-Ai De las Alas. Soon after that, she released her first album entitled "Lucky Girl", under Star Records. The world was astounded at Janelle's decision to leave Wowowee on May 31, 2007. She decided to leave the show to study music in the US and pursue her singing career, as singing is her passion and she wanted to be known more as a singer, rather than just a host. Performing in front of millions of people has always been her long time dream and she felt she wasn't able to do that when hosting a number one noontime show. She left for Atlanta, GA to study music and recorded her second album there under Sony Music. She made a comeback with her latest album, Di Na Maibabalik, under Viva Records, and is now focusing on writing and producing her own songs. GMA Network 2021

Aside from her TV hosting stint, she was able to do guest stints in 2016 on Wowowin and Bakit Manipis Ang Ulap a short-lived TV miniseries that aired Monday, Tuesdays and Thursdays in the Philippines, the same name title adapted from a 1985 movie. In 2013 she starred in an Indie movie called the Muses as one of the lead vocalists of a band.

== Filmography ==
Year	Title	Role
2005	Forever in My Heart	Bea
2005	Maynila	Rona
2005	VidJoking	Host/Herself
2006	Yes, Yes Show!	Herself
2005–2007	Wowowee	Co-host/Herself
2006	Kapag Tumibok ang Puso	Honey
2010	Pilipinas Win Na Win	Co-host/Herself
2012	It's Showtime	Guest
2013	The Muses	Lead Actor/Marthe San Lucas
2016	Bakit Manipis ang Ulap?	Leila

== Albums ==
Date of release	Title	Album Sales Award (PHIL Music threshold)
2006 Star Music	Lucky Girl	
2009 Sony Music	"Jel Believer"	
2017 Viva Records	"Di Na Maibabalik"	
