= Yes, Yes Show! =

- Genre: Comedy-gag; Variety show
- Starring: Bayani Agbayani
- Opening theme: "Neknek Mo" by Lito Camo
- Country of origin: Philippines
- Original language: Filipino

Production
- Executive producer: Carla St. Anne Burwell
- Production company: ABS-CBN Studios

Original release
- Network: ABS-CBN
- Release: February 25, 2004 – 2006

Yes, Yes Show! is a Philippine television sketch comedy show broadcast by ABS-CBN. Starring Bayani Agbayani, it aired from February 25, 2004 to 2006, replacing Whattamen. It was tagged as the first Live-Gag show in the Philippines.

== Cast ==
- Bayani Agbayani
- Vhong Navarro
- Aiko Melendez
- Candy Pangilinan
- Tuesday Vargas
- Isko Salvador
- Lito Camo
- Vanna Garcia
- Thammie Aliwalas
- Viva Hot Babes
- Viva Hot Men
- Frances Garcia
- Pokwang
- Terry
- Janelle Jamer
- Clown In A Million Finalists
- Paw Diaz
- Joseph Garcia
- Sarah Geronimo (Guest Cast)
