= Rico J. Puno =

Filipino singer, actor, and politician (1953–2018)

- Born: Enrico de Jesus Puno; February 13, 1953; Manila, Philippines
- Died: October 30, 2018 (aged 65) Taguig, Metro Manila, Philippines
- Genre: Manila sound
- Instruments: Vocals
- Years active: 1975–2018

Member of the Makati City Council from the 1st District
- In office June 30, 2016 – October 30, 2018
- In office June 30, 1998 – June 30, 2007

Personal details
- Resting place: The Heritage Park, Taguig
- Party: Una Ang Makati (2018); UNA (2015–2018)
- Other political affiliations: PDP–Laban (1998–2015); LAMMP (1998)
- Spouse: Doris P. Tayag (m. 1981)
- Children: Tosca Camille, Rio, 3 others
- Education: Philippine School of Business Administration (BA)
- Occupation: Politician, businessman, entrepreneur, comedian, TV host
- Profession: Singer, actor

Enrico de Jesus Puno (Tagalog: [ɛnˈɾɪkɔ de hɛˈsus ˈpʊnɔʔ]; February 13, 1953 – October 30, 2018), better known as Rico J. Puno (Tagalog: [ˈɾikɔ dʒeɪ ˈpʊnɔʔ]), was a Filipino singer, television host, actor, comedian and politician. He was considered as a music icon in the Philippines. He started the trend of incorporating Tagalog lyrics in his rendition of the American song "The Way We Were" and other foreign songs. Puno was known as a singer who regularly infused his on-stage performance with tongue-in-cheek comedy and adult humor. He hosted the ABS-CBN noontime variety shows Pilipinas Win na Win (alongside Rey Valera, Marco Sison, and Nonoy Zuñiga for two months in 2010) and Happy Yipee Yehey!.

Puno was also active in politics. He served as a city councilor of Makati from the city's 1st district from 1998 to 2007 and from 2016 until his death in 2018. He also unsuccessfully ran for vice mayor of Makati in 2010.

== Biography ==
Puno was born on February 13, 1953 in Manila to Felipe Puno Sr. and Corazon J. Puno. He was the eldest of six siblings raised in Balic-balic, Sampaloc, Manila. He attended Victorino Mapa High School. Although he earned a Bachelor of Arts degree from the Philippine School of Business Administration, Puno dreamed of becoming a singer.

== Music career ==
Puno introduced himself and his talent to the entertainment business by performing at folk houses and small clubs in Metro Manila. In 1975, while singing at the Palazzi, Puno met and performed with the American Motown group, The Temptations. Puno's talent was later noticed by the executive producers from Vicor Records (now Vicor Music). His first record was Love Won't Let Me Wait, while his first big hit was the Tagalog-infused The Way We Were.

In 1976, Puno won the Aliw Award for Most Promising Entertainer. Two years later, he became Aliw's Entertainer of the Year. His Rico in Concert show at the Cultural Center of the Philippines launched him as one of the foremost Philippine pop stars.

In 1977, Puno covered the Carpenters song "Merry Christmas Darling" from his first Christmas album, The Spirit of Christmas which was originally sung by Karen Carpenter.

In 1978, Puno's popularity and his regular concerts at the Araneta Coliseum (now SMART Araneta Coliseum) in Quezon City and his performance tours in the United States broke records in terms of audience attendance. His fame also made him into a sought-after product endorser including advertisements for San Miguel Beer in the 1970s.

In 1979, Puno represented the Philippines at the Tokyo Music Festival, with "Lupa" (Ground), a song that imparted messages on how an individual could strive to change for the better, on how to gain humility and other human values, on how not to judge others, and on how to struggle against one's own weaknesses.

From 2001, the Greatest Hits series in Manila, produced by Viva Concerts helped maintain Puno's popularity. These Greatest Hits concerts brought him together with other hitmakers in the Philippine music scene during the 1980s, namely Philippine pop icons: Hajji Alejandro, Rey Valera, Nonoy Zuñiga and Marco Sison.

He also covered the song "Ang Huling El Bimbo" in 1994 which was originally a major hit for the Eraserheads.

He also covered the song "Mabuti Pa Sila" in 2010 and originally composed and recorded by Gary Granada.

During Puno's recent performances, he is often joined on stage by his oldest daughter, Tosca Camille. Rico's son, Rox is also a singer and a band member.

He was honored and awarded recently in ASAP Pinoy on the variety program ASAP, contributing his best in singing performing as a total entertainer who celebrated his 40th anniversary in music and entertainment movie and TV career in 2017.

=== Hit songs ===
Puno's hit songs included "Kapalaran" (Fate), "Buhat" (Ever Since), "Macho Gwapito" (Gorgeous Young Man), "Lupa" (Soil or Ground), "Damdamin" (Feelings), "May Bukas Pa" (There's Still Tomorrow), "Ang Tao'y Marupok" (People Are Fragile), "Magkasuyo Buong Gabi" (Together Through the Night) – a duet with Elsa Chan – and his Filipino rendition of "You Don't Have To Be A Star (To Be in My Show)".

One of Puno's recent albums, is Aliw by Sony BMG Records. His carrier single was "Kay Hirap Mong Limutin" (It Is Hard To Forget You) by Lito Camo.

== Popularity ==
The duration of Puno's career spanned more than four decades. He was a favorite of the Philippine Amusement and Games Corporation (PAGCOR) and other casinos around Metro Manila and the provinces. His performances included tours in the United States, Canada, Dubai, Hong Kong, Japan, Australia and European countries.

== Acting career ==
Aside from singing, Rico also ventured into acting as a comedian. His first movie was Bawal Na Pag-ibig in 1977. His first and only action thriller movie was Alas Dose (2001), where he plays as a bad congressman who bombs a preschool learning center.

Owing to his rising popularity, various TV networks and movie producers soon came knocking on his door for more acting/hosting opportunities. GMA Network hired Puno to host a noontime variety show, Lunch Date which first aired in March 1986 and served as a replacement for Student Canteen. However, in 1987 he left the show after it reformatted. In 1994–1995, he headlined another noontime show, Chibugan Na (It's Eating Time), aired weekdays at noon on RPN, with Hajji Alejandro.

Puno returned as TV host for Macho Guwapito on the now-defunct Makisig Network. He was one of the judges in the inaugural week of the reality talent show Showtime on ABS-CBN. In 2010, he also hosted Pilipinas Win na Win and later Happy Yipee Yehey! in 2011–2012. He later returned as a judge on It's Showtime, this time for its segment Tawag ng Tanghalan.

== Other ventures ==
Puno was also the owner of the karaoke bar, Coriks, at Vito Cruz Extension, Makati. He also managed a trucking business.

== Political career ==
Puno ran and won a seat in the Makati City Council for the first district in 1998 under Lakas–CMD. He later switched to PDP–Laban, aligning with the ruling Binay family. Among his notable ordinances filed during his first term was the installation of a surveillance camera in every convenience store in Makati that operates 24 hours a day, as protection against robbers who prey on convenience stores. He was re-elected in 2001 and 2004. He left the city council after his third and final consecutive term ended in 2007. His seat in the city council was kept by his eldest daughter, Tosca Camille. He then teamed up with Junjun Binay to run for vice mayor of Makati in 2010. Although Binay won the mayoralty race, Puno lost to Kid Peña, who was the running mate of then-outgoing vice mayor Ernesto Mercado.

As his daughter Tosca was term-limited, he successfully regained a seat in the Makati City Council in 2016 under the United Nationalist Alliance (UNA) ticket of Abigail Binay. In October 2018, he left UNA and was among the 13 councilors who pledged support to former Mayor Junjun Binay, who would run against his sister, incumbent Mayor Abigail Binay, in the upcoming 2019 elections. He planned to seek reelection but died after he filed his Certificate of Candidacy (COC). He was substituted by his daughter Tosca, who would then go on to win a seat in the city council and serve until 2022.

== Death ==
Puno died of heart failure at age 65 on October 30, 2018, at St. Luke's Medical Center – Global City. His wake was held at the Santuario de San Antonio Parish in Forbes Park, Makati, with a requiem Mass held on November 5. On November 6, his remains were later brought to the Makati City Hall before being laid to rest at The Heritage Park in Taguig.

== Awards ==
- Special Lifetime Achievement Award, ASAP Pinoy 2017, ASAP Show, ABS-CBN 2

Year	Award giving body	Category	Nominated work	Results
2008	Awit Awards	Best World/Alternative/Bossa Music Recording	"Sorry na, Pwede Ba?" with Brownman Revival	Nominated

== Filmography ==
=== Film ===
- Bawal Na Pag-ibig (1977)
- Wow! Sikat Pare, Bigat! (1977)
- Silang Mga Mukhang Pera (1977)
- Bullet for Your Music (1978)
- Annabelle Huggins Story (1982)
- Isang Platitong Mani (1986)
- Payaso (1986)
- Dr. Potpot Travels to the Moon (1991) – Enzio
- Tom & Jerry: Hindi Kaming Hayop (1993) – Alfie
- Sailor's Disaster (1994) – Bruno
- Indecent Professor (1995) – Atty. Fernando Gorospe
- Alyas Boy Tigas: Ang Probinsyanong Wais (1998)
- Matalino Man ang Matsing Na-iisahan Din! (2000)
- Juan & Ted: Wanted (2000) – Mr. Mariano
- Alas-Dose (2001) – Congressman
- A.B. Normal College: Todo Na 'Yan! Kulang Pa 'Yun! (2003)
- Pakners (2003) – Richard de Guzman
- Asboobs: Asal Bobo (2003) – Capt. Palma
- Who's That Girl? (2011) – Rico
- Instant Mommy (2013) – Ben

=== Television ===
- Rico Baby
- Rated A
- GMA Supershow (1978–1997) – guest performer
- Student Canteen (1975–1986) – guest performer
- Lunch Date
- Chibugan Na!
- Vilma on Seven! (1986–1995) – guest performer
- It's Showtime – Guest Judge
- Talentadong Pinoy
- Daboy en Da Girl
- Show Me Da Manny
- Pilipinas Win Na Win
- Macho Guwapito
- Willing Willie
- Umagang Kay Ganda
- Happy Yipee Yehey
- The X Factor Philippines
- Lorenzo's Time
- Little Champ
- The Sharon Cuneta Show (1988–1997) – Guest / Performer
- Ryan Ryan Musikahan (1988–1995) – Guest / Performer
- Sa Linggo nAPO Sila (1990–1995) – Guest / Performer
- 'Sang Linggo nAPO Sila (1995–1998) – Guest / Performer
- Home Sweetie Home
- Sabado Badoo
- It's Showtime – Judge of Tawag Ng Tanghalan
- Eat Bulaga! – Guest / Performer
- FPJ's Ang Probinsyano – Engelbert "Daga" Moreno (guest role) (November–December 2017)
- Wowowin – Guest / Performer
- Your Face Sounds Familiar Season 2 – Guest Judges of week 10
- RJ's Penthouse – Guest / Performer
- 1 for 3 – Guest Cast

== Discography ==
=== Albums ===
==== Studio albums ====
- The Way We Were (1973, Sunshine/Vicor)
- Kapalaran (1975, Sunshine/Vicor)
- Rico J. Puno (1976, Sunshine/Vicor)
- Spirit of Christmas (1976, Sunshine/Vicor)
- Rico Baby (1977, Sunshine/Vicor)
- The Total Entertainer (1977, Sunshine/Vicor)
- Tatak (1977, Sunshine/Vicor)
- Macho Gwapito (1979, Sunshine/Vicor)
- Diyos ang Pag-Ibig (1980, Sunshine/Vicor)
- Ako Ang May Nais (1989, Ivory Records)
- Rico J. Puno (1991, Viva Records)
- Aliw (2001)
- With Love in Our Hearts (2005)
- Rico J Puno's Best Nonstop Songs (2022)

==== Compilation albums ====
- The Story Of: Rico J. Puno (The Ultimate OPM Collection) (2001, EMI Philippines)
- Once Again... with Rico J. Puno, Marco Sison and Rey Valera Vol. 1 (with Marco Sison & Rey Valera) (2003, Vicor)
- Rico Silver Series (2006, Viva Records)
- Walang Kupas... All Hits (2008, Vicor)

==== Live albums ====
- The Way We Were: Live (with Basil Valdez) (2004, Viva Records)
- Rico J. Puno: Live in Hawaii (produced by Willy Martin)

==== Compilation appearances ====
- The 2nd Metro Manila Pop Music Festival (1978, Blackgold)
- Handog sa Pasko (1991, Viva Records)
- Metropop Song Festival 1996 (1996, Infinity Music)
- 25 Great Songs 25 Great Artists (1998, OctoArts/EMI Music Philippines)
- Ultraelectromagneticjam! (2005, Musiko Records/Sony BMG Music Philippines)
- No. 1 Signature Hits OPM's Best (2008, Viva/Vicor)
- Pinoy Sound Trip Vol. 1 (2008, Vicor)
- Pinoy Sound Trip Vol. 2 (2008, Vicor)
- 18 Inspirational Love Songs (2009, Viva Records)
- Live Na Live: Unforgettable Live Performance (2009, Viva Records)
- C.H.I.N. Picnic Celebration, Toronto Canada (produced by Joel Recla) (2012)

=== Soundtrack appearances ===
- Happy Yipee Yehey! Soundtrack (2011, Star Records)

=== Singles ===
- "All I Ever Want" (a finalist of Metropop Song Festival 1996)
- "Cartada Dies"
- "Kapalaran" (covered by Radioactive Sago Project, Martin Nievera & Gary V. & used for the action serye "FPJs Batang Quiapo")
- "Kay Hirap Mong Limutin" (Composed by Lito Camo)
- "Macho Guwapito" (covered by Protein Shake)
- "May Bukas Pa" (covered by Erik Santos)
- "Sorry Na, Pwede Ba?" (covered by Brownman Revival)
- "Together Forever"

==== Cover versions ====
- "Ang Huling El Bimbo" (Originally by Eraserheads)
- "Give Love on Christmas Day" (Originally by the Jackson 5)
- "Kahit Maputi Na ang Buhok Ko" (Originally by Rey Valera)
- "Mabuti Pa Sila" (Originally by Gary Granada)
- "Merry Christmas Darling" (Originally by the Carpenters)
- "Miss Kita Kung Christmas" (Originally by Susan Fuentes)
- "Sana Dalawa ang Puso" (Originally by Bodjie's Law of Gravity)
- "The Way We Were" (Originally by Barbra Streisand)
- "Time After Time" (Originally by Cyndi Lauper) (1987)
- "Weekend in Manila" (Originally by Barry Manilow as "Weekend in New England")
- "Yakap sa Dilim" (Originally by APO Hiking Society)
- "Lupa" (Originally by Asin Band)
- "Ako Ang May Nais" (Originally by Frank Sinatra as My Way)
