= Victorino Mapa High School =

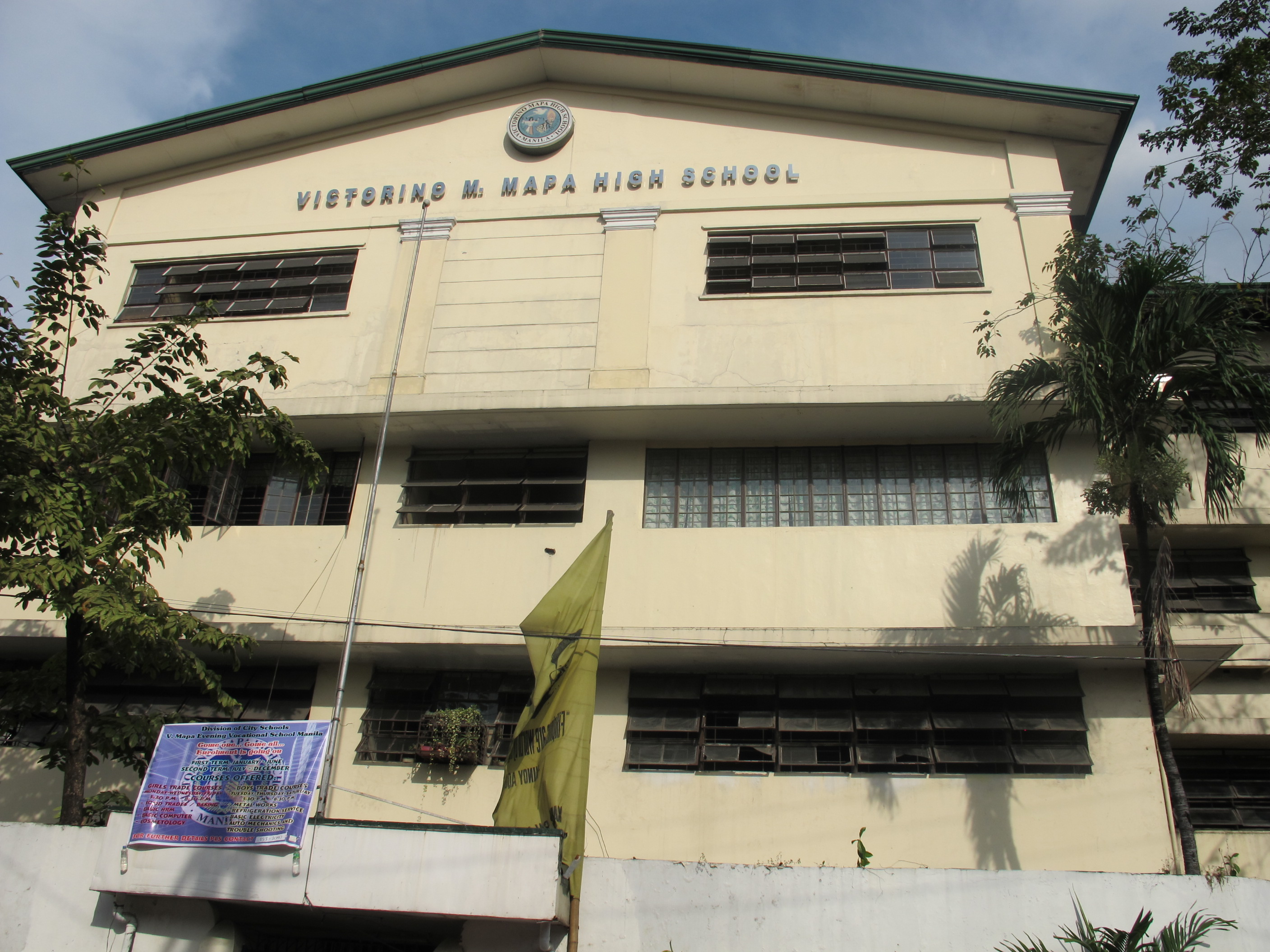
- Facade showing the name of the School

Location
- (Philippines) 300 San Rafael St. San Miguel, Manila; Philippines; 14.597905°N 120.992108°E

Information
- Type: Public with Special Science
- Motto: Soar High Mapa High, Excellence Forever
- Established: June 1923
- Principal: Mr. Edmund G. Villareal
- Grades: 7 to 10
- Enrollment: approx. 9,000
- Language: English, Filipino
- Campus: Urban
- Colors: Blue, White
- Nickname: VMHS, Mapa
- Newspaper: The Mapazette, Ang Gabay and Ang Likha
- Affiliations: Division of City Schools-Manila
- Hymn: "V.Mapa High School Hymn"

Victorino Mapa High School (Filipino: Mataas na Paaralang Victorino Mapa) (formerly Manila East High School), situated in San Miguel, Manila, is one of the oldest public high schools in the city. It has produced a list of successful graduates in various fields since its foundation in 1923.

Along with Manila Science High School, Ramon Magsaysay High School, Manuel Roxas High School, Arellano (Manila North) High School, and Araullo High School, Victorino Mapa offers rigorous Special Science courses to selected top students. The institution is considered one of the top schools in Manila in terms of its performance in achievement tests and competitions. In 2007, VMHS was named one of the cleanest schools in Manila.

== History ==
Victorino Mapa High School opened its first classes (Manila East High School) as one of the four schools in City of Manila together with Torres High School (Manila South High School) and Arellano (Manila North) High School in June 1923.

The school has been under the administration of principals since it was founded in June 1923. The three of these were Americans namely, John Carl, Sarah M. England and James Burns. The first Filipino principal was Indalecio Madamba, installed in 1951. In his term, the Parents-Teachers Association was organized and succession of principals took over, after Madamba retired in May 1956.

Student population of VMHS traditionally comes from the district of San Miguel, Quiapo, Sampaloc and Santa Mesa consisting of family homogenous in economic and social standards with a few transferees from provinces and graduate from Padre Burgos Elementary School (PBES) of Principal Ms. Trinidad R. Galang. in Altura St. Sta Mesa, Manila.

The school once had a biggest student population of 11,481 with a faculty of 488.

In January 2025 Mayor Honey Lacuna officiated the groundbreaking ceremony for a new 7-story complex.

== Notable alumni ==
- Arturo M. Tolentino - 9th Vice President of the Philippines, Senate President.
- Jose Melo - Former chairperson of Commission on Elections (COMELEC) and retired Supreme Court Justice
- Levi Celerio - Composer, lyricist, and National Artist for Music and Literature (conferred in 1997)
- Ishmael Bernal - Film director and National Artist for Film
- Rico J. Puno - Singer and celebrity
- Artemio Panganiban - former Supreme Court Justice
- Ogie Diaz - Comedian, actor, talk show host, and columnist.
- Washington SyCip - accountant and co-founder of SGV & Co. Accounting Firm
- Benny M. Abante - Congressman, 6th District of Manila (2004-2010; 2019–present)
- Jefferson Utanes - Voice actor and announcer
- Eli Remonola - current governor of the Bangko Sentral ng Pilipinas
