= Mariel Rodriguez =

Filipino-born American commercial model, endorser, television host, VJ and actress

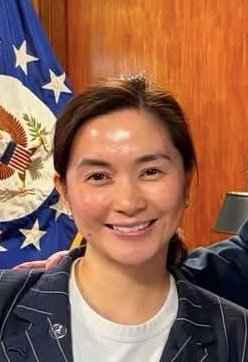
- Rodriguez in 2026
- Born: Maria Erlinda Lucille Sazon Termulo; August 10, 1984 (age 42); Philippines
- Other name: Mariel Rodriguez-Padilla
- Citizenship: United States
- Education: De La Salle University (BA)
- Occupations: Actress, host, model, VJ
- Years active: 2001–present
- Agents: GMA Network (2004–2005) ABS-CBN (2005–2011; 2015–2022) TV5 (2011–2015; 2021–present); ALLTV (2022–present); TVJ Productions (2025–present); APT Entertainment (2025–present); MQuest Ventures and Star Worx (2025–present)
- Spouse: Robin Padilla (m. 2010)
- Children: 2

Maria Erlinda Lucille Sazon Termulo-Padilla (born August 10, 1984), professionally known as Mariel Rodriguez (Tagalog: [maɾˈjɛl ɾɔˈdɾigɛs paˈdilja]), is a Filipino-born American actress, television host, model, and video jockey.

== Early life ==
Mariel Rodriguez was born Maria Erlinda Lucille Sazon Termulo on August 10, 1984. She was known by the nickname "Mariel" as a child, lived with and was raised by her maternal grandparents in Parañaque due to her parents' separation in her youth. She studied at De La Salle Santiago Zobel School for grade school and high school and attended De La Salle University for college, where she studied with a Bachelor of Arts in Philippine Studies, major in Filipino in Mass Media.

== Career ==
Rodriguez started her career at the age of 15 as a commercial model, which included Clean & Clear. In 2004, she was cast in MTV Asia's television show Rouge. Introducing herself through the webcam, she flew to Singapore for the audition and got the part. Her role in the show caught the eye of MTV Philippines executives and was made a VJ in December 2004. She left MTV in April 2006.

GMA Network signed her as one of their stars. While in the network, she became one of the regular hosts of Extra Challenge, and appeared on the series Love to Love.

In 2005, Rodriguez moved to ABS-CBN, where she joined as a co-host of the competition series Pinoy Big Brother until 2010. Later, she became well known for co-hosting the noon-time programs Wowowee (2006–10), Pilipinas Win Na Win (2010), and Happy Yipee Yehey! (2011). Additionally, Rodriguez also acted in the Komiks series Varga in 2008, where she starred in the titular main role as Varga, and two installments of the Precious Hearts Romances Presents, namely Bud Brothers and Love Is Only in the Movies, in 2009 and Cinco in 2010, respectively.

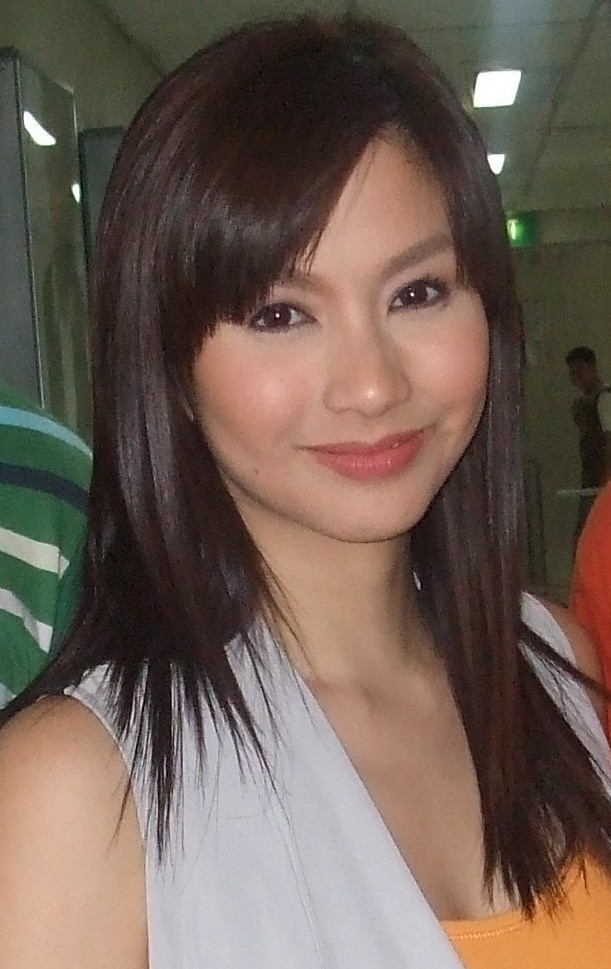
Rodriguez in 2010

In September 2011, she moved to TV5, where she continued her co-hosting stint for Willie Revillame's variety show Wil Time Bigtime from 2011 to 2013, which upon its cancellation was followed by Wowowillie, which she continued to co-host.

In November 2015, she returned to ABS-CBN and reprised her role as co-host in Pinoy Big Brother: 737, which also serves as the reunion of Kuya's Angels together with Toni Gonzaga and Bianca Gonzalez respectively. She also appeared in 737 as a celebrity houseguest, alongside Enchong Dee and Karla Estrada.

In 2015, Rodriguez was tapped as the guest host of It's Showtime along with Amy Perez. Weeks later, she confirmed their official participation on the show as main co-hosts.

In September 2022, Rodriguez officially signed a contract with AMBS to be part of the new Channel 2 TV station, ALLTV.

In 2025, Rodriguez returned again to TV5 and became guest co-host and performer of Eat Bulaga! in the place of Tito Sotto.

== Personal life ==
Rodriguez married actor-director Robin Padilla at the Taj Mahal in Agra, India, on August 19, 2010. They had met on the Philippine noon time variety show Wowowee when Padilla was temporarily a presenter. Rodriguez, a Catholic, did not convert to Islam following her marriage with Padilla, who is a Muslim.

In March 2015, Rodriguez revealed that she had suffered a miscarriage, which would have been her first child with Padilla. In August 2015, Padilla announced that he and Rodriguez were expecting triplets. However, a few weeks after the announcement, a statement was released from Padilla's manager that Rodriguez had suffered a second miscarriage.

On May 21, 2016, on an episode of It's Showtime, Rodriguez announced that she was pregnant for the third time. On August 13, 2016, it was announced that she and Padilla would have a daughter, due in November. Their daughter, Maria Isabella, was born on November 14, 2016, in Delaware. She gave birth to her second child named Maria Gabriela who was born on November 15, 2019, also in the United States.

Rodriguez is an American citizen. According to Padilla, Rodriguez and her family voted for Donald Trump in the 2016 U.S. presidential election.

== Filmography ==
=== Film ===
Year	Title	Role
2007	Agent X44	Mary Grace / Agent 690
2009	Astig	Nurse
2010	Noy	Herself/Cameo
2010	Cinco	Rizza
2011	Tum, My Pledge of Love	Erlinda Dimatumba
2014	Sa Ngalan ng Ama, Ina at mga Anak	Indah

=== Television ===
Year	Title	Role
2001	Rouge	Pam
2001	MTV Philippines	Herself / VJ
2003	OK Fine, Whatever	Mariel
2004	Love to Love: Maid for Each Other	Herself
2004	Extra Challenge	Host
2004	Love to Love: True Romance	Herself
2005	Pinoy Big Brother (season 1)	Host
2006–2010	Wowowee	Co-host
2006	Pinoy Big Brother: Celebrity Edition 1	Host
2006	Your Song Presents: Feb-Ibig	Justine
2006	Pinoy Big Brother Teen Edition	Host
2007	Pinoy Big Brother (season 2)	Host
2007	Pinoy Big Brother: Celebrity Edition 2	Host / Guest Celebrity Housemate
2007–2011	Entertainment Live	Host
2008	Pinoy Big Brother: Teen Edition Plus	Host
2008	Palos	Viola, The Talking Car (Voice)
2008	Love Spell Presents: Elevator	Mia
2008	Komiks Presents: Mars Ravelo's Varga	Varga / Vara
2009	Precious Hearts Romances Presents: Bud Brothers (Book 2: My Gulay... Wow Betchay!)	Betchay / Elizabeth Panganiban
2009	Pinoy Big Brother Double Up	Host
2010	Precious Hearts Romances Presents: Love Is Only In The Movies	Sheye
2010	SNN: Showbiz News Ngayon	Guest anchor
2010	Teen Clash of 2010	Herself / Host
2010	Pilipinas Win Na Win	Co-host
2011	Wansapanataym: Ningning Kuting	Ningning
2011	Happy Yipee Yehey!	Host
2011–2013	Wil Time Bigtime	Co-host
2012	Video Incredible	Host
2012	Paparazzi	Host
2013	Wowowillie	Co-host
2014	It's Showtime	Hurado
2015	Happy Wife, Happy Life	Host
2015	Pinoy Big Brother: 737	Big Night returning Main host
2016; 2018–2019	It's Showtime	Main host
2016	Pinoy Big Brother: Lucky 7	Main host
2022–2025	M.O.M.S — Mhies on a Mission	Host
2022	Sama ALL, Saya ALL sa ALLTV! Soft Launch Special	Host
2025–present	Eat Bulaga!	Guest co-host / Performer
2026–present	Vibe+	Guest / Performer
