= Pilipinas Win Na Win =

Philippine television variety show

- Title card
- Genre: Comedy; Musical; Variety show
- Created by: ABS-CBN Studios
- Developed by: ABS-CBN Studios
- Directed by: Johnny Manahan
- Creative director: Bobot Mortiz
- Presented by: Kris Aquino; Robin Padilla; Rico J. Puno; Rey Valera; Marco Sison; Nonoy Zuñiga
- Narrated by: Peter Musñgi
- Opening theme: "Pilipinas Win Na Win"
- Country of origin: Philippines
- Original language: Tagalog
- No. of episodes: 132

Production
- Executive producers: Phoebe Anievas; Rancy Recato
- Production locations: ABS-CBN Studio 3, Quezon City, Metro Manila
- Running time: 2 ½ hours (July–October 2010, Weekdays); 1 hour (October–December 2010)

Original release
- Network: ABS-CBN
- Release: July 31 – December 31, 2010

Related
- Eat Bulaga!; MTB; Wowowee; It's Showtime; Happy Yipee Yehey!

Pilipinas Win Na Win! (transl. Philippines, totally winning!) is a Philippine television variety show broadcast by ABS-CBN. Originally hosted by Kris Aquino, Robin Padilla, Pokwang, Valerie Concepcion and Mariel Rodriguez, it aired on the network's PrimeTanghali line up from July 31 to December 31, 2010, replacing Wowowee and was replaced by Happy Yipee Yehey!. Pokwang, Concepcion, Rico J. Puno, Rey Valera, Marco Sison, Nonoy Zuñiga and K Brosas served as the final hosts.

== Hosts ==
=== Final hosts ===
- Rico J. Puno†
- Rey Valera
- Nonoy Zuñiga
- Marco Sison

=== Final co-hosts ===
- Pokwang
- Valerie Concepcion
- K Brosas

=== Former hosts ===
- Robin Padilla
- Kris Aquino

=== Former co-hosts ===
- Mariel Rodriguez
- Pooh
- Chokoleit†
- Janelle Jamer
- Gazelle "Speedy Gee" Canlas

=== Featuring ===
- Bentong†
- DJ Ace
- Saicy Aguila
- Win na Win Dancers
- Lassie
- Atak Araña

== History ==
Pilipinas Win Na Win premiered on July 31, 2010, as a response of ABS-CBN to Willie Revillame's indefinite leave from Wowowee stemming from the controversial row between him and Jobert Sucaldito that flared up on May 4 that same year, wherein Revillame chastised the then-DZMM radio host about his newspaper columns that criticize the show's auditioning of contestants with below-average grades.

Promotions before the program's premiere revealed Robin Padilla and Kris Aquino as the main hosts while Wowowee's Mariel Rodriguez, Pokwang and Valerie Concepcion would reprise their role as co-hosts. Prior to settling with its current name, the show's draft title was Pilipinas For The Win. Most of the new show's behind-the-scenes staff and dancers were also carried over from its displaced predecessor.

A week after the premiere, Padilla left the show, citing an indefinite leave due to Ramadan, but did not plan to come back. Mariel Rodriguez also followed suit. To stem up the early setback, celebrity guest co-hosts were invited, including comedians Jason Gainza, Pooh, and Chokoleit.

By August 9, 2010, some of "Pilipinas Win na Win"'s staff (led by business head Jay Montelibano) and backup dancers also left the show to join Willie Revillame's new production company, Wil Productions Inc, after the former Wowowee host declared in a press conference held on the same day that he had unilaterally ended his contract with ABS-CBN. This would accelerate a plague of low ratings since launch, and by mid-September, ABS-CBN asked Kris Aquino to leave the show.

Aquino quietly left Pilipinas Win na Win without any goodbyes on September 30, 2010. Two days later, ABS-CBN officially announced four new hosts and two new co-hosts. The four hosts tagged as the "hitmakers" were Rico J. Puno, Rey Valera, Marco Sison, and Nonoy Zuniga while the two new co-hosts were Janelle Jamer - one of the three original co-hosts of Wowowee, and a newcomer: Gazelle "Speedy Gee" Canlas of Music Uplate Live. The six new hosts started their roles on October 4, 2010. On October 9, 2010, the "hitmaker" hosts celebrated their first week hosting the show thru an elaborate performance where the hosts sung a mashup of Justin Bieber's "Baby", and their most popular OPM song. Co-hosts Pokwang, Valerie Concepcion, Janelle Jamer, and "Speedy Gee" gave them a certificate to congratulate their first week on the show. On November 6, 2010, the "hitmakers" celebrated their first month hosting the show. By November, Jamer and Canlas were both let go and replaced by comedienne-singer K Brosas.

In spite of the series of revamps, the program was met by a continuous stream of dismal ratings and alternating time slots. From a 12:00 pm schedule and running time of two and a half hours upon its launch, the show was moved to 12:45 pm and a reduced 1 hour and 45 minutes by September. It was further reduced to an hour and 15 minutes by mid-October and by November, the program had been slashed to just running an hour long at a 1:30 pm start time.

=== Cancellation ===
On December 20, 2010, Rico J. Puno formally announced during the show that Pilipinas Win na Win would air its final episode on New Year's Eve due to low ratings. Prior to this, rumors of the impending decision spread around entertainment websites resulting from interviews of showbiz reporters with fellow co-host Valerie Concepcion.

Industry insiders also started to speculate about the show's potential replacement, such as a Philippine version of The Price Is Right hosted by one of Pilipinas Win Na Win's inaugural hosts, Kris Aquino.

Pilipinas Win na Win's final broadcast aired on December 31, 2010 with Richard Poon serving as its final musical guest while the rest of the program gave way to a simple retrospective with the hosts singing "It's Just Another New Year's Eve".

The ensuing interregnum was temporarily filled by Showtime on the noontime slot with the telenovela Malparida serving as its lead-out at 1:30 pm until Happy Yipee Yehey! premiered on February 12, 2011.

== Segments ==
=== Final segments ===
==== Sa Araw ng Pasko, Hiling Mo... Tutuparin ko ====
Sa Araw ng Pasko, Hiling Mo... Tutuparin Ko (lit. On Christmas Day, Your Wish... I'll Grant) is a segment in which children can SMS their wishes for the upcoming Christmas holiday. It also features the child's heartwarming story. Some of the prizes given on the segment are a Noche Buena package, and groceries for the whole family. On December 19, the segment was expanded from Saturday to daily.

==== Hulihin ang Bituin, Kampihan Kapamilya ====
Aired Saturdays and pre-taped in barangays, fifty contestants battle out in mini-games for P100,000. There are six types of mini-games whether it is simply correctly identifying a played song, or taking part in a physical dare. After the cancellation of Pilipinas Win na Win, this segment was carried over to Showtime.

==== Ang Theme Song ng Buhay Mo ====
Every weekdays, Ang Theme Song ng Buhay Mo (lit. The Theme Song of Your Life) features various contestants that share their heart-felt stories about their personal lives of love, hate, etc. The hosts will sing a song relating to their lives, and the contestant receives P5,000. The most popular contestant chosen by the audience will advance to Gulong ng Premyo.

==== Gulong ng Premyo ====
In the Gulong ng Premyo (lit. Prize Wheel) segment, the winner of Ang Theme Song ng Buhay Mo gets to spin a wheel that has a different money amounts from P5,000 to P50,000. The space landed on the wheel will be the prize won. As always, the home partner will receive the same amount and three random studio audience member(s) will receive the same winnings with the player's winnings divided by three.

==== OMG! Ano Ito? ====
Twenty-five texters, and twenty-five audience members have a chance to play OMG! Ano Ito? (lit. OMG! What's This?). One contestant chosen by random draw goes on to play to the jackpot round.

Forty-five seconds will be given to the contestant to guess as much guesses as possible for the P1,000,000 mystery capsule. The more guesses, the better chances of winning. At the second part of the jackpot round, audience members will reveal their guesses, and the contestant can choose five of the audience's guesses. The audience member chosen will win P1,000 for their item being chosen, and will win P10,000 if their guess was exact. The ten guesses that are the potential capsule items will be revealed. One by one, the contestant will remove an item they think is not in the capsule. Each item that is correctly not in the capsule is worth P20,000. The contestant can walk away at any time. If a contestant is not certain of choosing an item, the computer can remove one item in exchange of removing P100,000 from the jackpot. When the contestant reaches three items on the list, the contestant has one final guess or a walk away. If they are risked to guess, he/she must risk all their earnings. If the contestant guesses correctly, the contestant wins the jackpot prize. At any point of the game, if the contestant removes the mystery item from the list, the contestant loses all their winnings, but still has the guaranteed P10,000.

=== Discontinued segments ===
Year	Game Name	Game Description
2010	Muse Universe	Airing Mondays, Wednesdays, Fridays, and Saturdays, three female contestants ranging from 16 to 22 years old battle out showing off their personal lives, and talents in pageant-style. Robin Padilla is "Mr. Bachelor", with Bentong as the card holder. There are two rounds: In first impressions, each contestant introduces themselves with their interests and hobbies. In the question-and-answer portion, Robin asks the ladies love-related questions. A winner(s) is crowned every other weekday, and every Saturdays, the daily winners come back for the weekly finals. The segment is on hiatus due to Robin's temporary leave, and Perfect Combination took its slot.
2010	Ping Pong Pang	All audience members start off with a balloon, however, nine (previously ten) of the balloons have the show's logo inside. The whole audience has to pass the balloons around and after it is passed, they must pop the balloon. If the logo is in a balloon, they are an automatic contestant for Ping Pong Pang. Three additional audience members are picked for "Bentong's Choice Award" who have energy and enthusiasm. This results in a total of twelve contestants. The objective of the game is to repeatedly say "Ping", "Pong", and "Pang" with energy and physical movements. When the microphone is ready for them, the contestant must cross both of his/her hands on their torso for "Ping", tap both of their hands to their knees for "Pong", and raising their hands in the air for "Pang". On August 3, the rules removed the physical movements of "Ping" and "Pong". If a contestant makes a mistake, they are either given a second chance or are eliminated depending on how they did. If a contestant is eliminated, they get P1,000 and a gift pack from Rexona as a consolation prize. The last person standing wins P15,000.
2010	Perfect Combination	Two teams of five contestants compete with memory skills daily on Perfect Combination. The rules are simple because each team has to punch in numbers shown on the video screen for three seconds when the hosts say "go". Three seconds are given on Level A consisting of 5 numbers, and Level B consisting of 7 numbers. Five seconds are given for Level C consisting of 11 numbers, and Level D consisting of 15 numbers. Seven seconds are given for Level E consisting of 17 numbers. If a team fails to punch in the correct numbers, the losing team gets P10,000 from Rexona. The winning team gets P20,000 and goes to the jackpot. In the jackpot round, a team can "choose their jackpot". 17 numbers are for P100,000, 20 numbers are for P120,000, 25 numbers are for P150,000, and 30 numbers are for P200,000. Each team has seven seconds to see the numbers. If the team successfully punches in the correct numbers, they win the jackpot.
2010	Yaman Ng Bayan	In the Yaman Ng Bayan (lit. The Country's Wealth) segment, three contestants chosen from themed auditions share their life stories and entertain the audience. A small situational skit is played by the cast members about the contestant's occupations. After the team leaders and their ten hometown players are introduced, they will get 5,000 pesos and play Ayu-Sing Nyo Na.
2010	Ayu-Sing Nyo Na	The players of Yaman Ng Bayan get to play in the Ayu-Sing Nyo Na (lit. Fix That Song) segment, where three team leaders, each with ten contestants from their hometown will compete to finish lyrics to hit songs. Each team must unscramble a picture of a celebrity singer. Whoever buzzes in first must guess who it is, and if the team leader is correct, one of the two house singers will sing a song either from that celebrity singer or a random song. The house singer will pause partially in the song for the ten hometown contestants to fill in the remaining five words to the song. Ten signs of words will be in a box, and the team will have thirty seconds to correctly use five of the ten words remaining in the song. If the team is correct, they get one point. If the team is wrong, a new question begins. Previously, the winner would advance to the Open Susi-Me jackpot round for P1,000,000. Effective September 4, 2010, the first team to get a song correct won P50,000.
2010	Mali-Oke	A celebrity house singer sings a song with several mistakes during the song. Six random audience members play. When a contestant successfully corrects the mistaken word, he/she wins a point. The first contestant to two points went to the Open Susi-Me jackpot round.
2010	Ilong Ilong	The whole audience warm up with the theme song of the show. The co-hosts will go around the studio and choose the most entertaining, energetic, and eye-catching people tagged as "Malup-8 Ka!". The eight people chosen win P1,000 and will play Ilong Ilong. The contestants pair up with a challenger. When the host says "Attention!", the partners will put up their finger. They must follow what the host does. It will be using their hands to tap a part of their body. The first contestant to make a mistake loses, while the other stays. In this tournament-style game, the last person standing wins and spins the wheel for winnings from P1,000 to P25,000. The cash prize landed on the wheel is what the contestant and home partner wins.
2010	Open Susi-Me	The Open Susi-Me ("Susi" is the Filipino word for "Key", play on the phrase Open Sesame) game mainly consists of doors and an aim to win a cash prize. Currently, the winner of Hit The Hits advance to this game. Five colored doors placed around the set, each worth P10,000, P20,000, P50,000, P200,000, and P1,000,000 respectively. The contestant has sixty seconds to run and unlock the first three doors to guarantee a P50,000 win. They can only use one key at a time. After the three doors unlock and time is still available, they have a choice to leave with P50,000 or play again for the orange door and get an additional ten seconds to their time. If they risk to go on, the P50,000 already earned will not be kept. They have the remaining time to unlock the orange door. If the orange door is unlocked, they have the choice to leave with P200,000 or play again for the red door and get an additional ten seconds to their time. If the team leader manages to open the red door, he/she wins P1,000,000, but if not, they go home with nothing. On October 16, 2010, the hosts could offer advantages to the contestants if they choose to not continue. Offers consist of one key subtracted for the door, extra five seconds, or both. On August 4, 2010, the segment produced its first millionaire, college student/scholar Von Allen Belinario, who was able to open the first three doors (P50,000) with less than 42 seconds left in the clock. The contestant decided to take the risk and go on with the game. The P200,000 orange door was opened with less than 35 seconds left in the clock. Belinario decided to go for the win, and decided to open the P1,000,000 red door. He was able to open the said jackpot door in record time, with 31 seconds left in the clock. The second format introduced September 4, 2010, consisted of ten random audience members of two teams. Teams have thirty seconds, and one by one, each player opens using one key. The first team who opens their team door first will win P10,000 each, while the losing team still leaves with P5,000. On September 27, the game reverted to its original rules without extra ten seconds.
2010	Hit the Hits	Fifty players play a musical trivia game in the brand new Hit the Hits. The hitmakers will sing a specific song. After the song is over, a trivia question relating to the song will be asked to the players. There are three options to choose from: A, B, or C. This is a last standing game, so the winner of the game advance to the OMG! Ano Ito? jackpot round.
2010	Galaw-Galaw, Gayahin Ang Sayaw	This is a game hosted by K Brosas and Pokwang in which ten random barangay residents with the best dancing skills to the show's latest song Galaw Galaw will participate in the game called Galaw-Galaw, Gayahin Ang Sayaw (lit. Move It-Move It, Imitate the Dance). Saicy and other cast members go to different barangays in Metro Manila to find the contestants. At the studio a song will be turned on, and the contestants must dance until a siren is up in which a host will do a frozen dance move the contestants need to copy. A contestant that fails to do the correct move will be out. When the game reaches a final four, the contestants play in pairs, then played until one winner is left standing. The winner receives P20,000.

== Awards and nominations ==
- 25th PMPC Star Awards For TV (Best Variety Show) – Nominated

== See also ==
- List of programs broadcast by ABS-CBN
- Wowowee
- Happy Yipee Yehey!
- It's Showtime
