= Valerie Concepcion =

Filipino actress

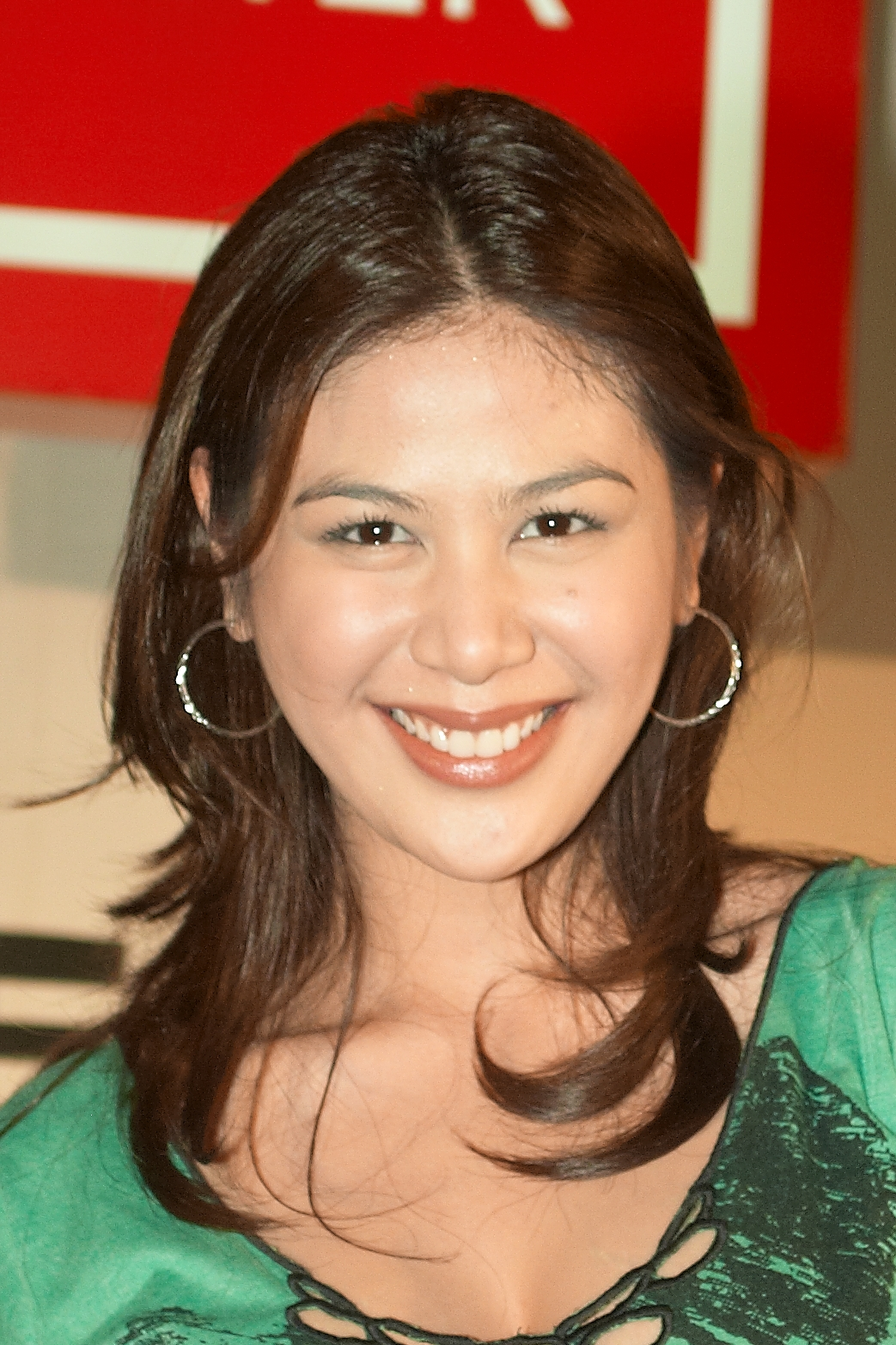
- Concepcion in 2010
- Born: Valerie Norona Galang; December 21, 1987 (age 38); Tondo, Manila, Philippines
- Education: Arellano University
- Occupations: Actress, host, endorser
- Years active: 2002–present
- Spouse: Francis Sunga (m. 2019)
- Children: 2

Valerie Norona Galang-Sunga (born December 21, 1987), known professionally as Valerie Concepcion (Tagalog pronunciation: [kɔnsɛpˈʃon]), is a Filipino actress, television host, and endorser. She is known for her role as Nora Ferrer in the soap opera Sinasamba Kita but later transferred to its rival network ABS-CBN. She then became a host in Wowowee and Pilipinas Win na Win as well as the first incarnation of Banana Split in 2008. In June 2013, she transferred back to her home network GMA Network and was cast as Ruth Monteclaro, the main antagonist in Anna Karenina. In December 2013, she transferred back again in ABS-CBN network and was cast as Gigi in Annaliza. In June 2014, she went back to GMA Network as Lavender Catacutan in My BFF. She also played the role of Veronica Salcedo in the hit primetime TV series, Because of You. In 2018, she starred as the main antagonist in 2018–2019 Ika-5 Utos as Clarisse Alfonso-Buenaventura / Cynthia and later joined its rival show Kadenang Ginto as Cindy Dimaguiba. She also guested in 2019 Wowowin as a co-host of Willie Revillame. Concepcion graduated from Arellano University with a degree of Bachelor of Arts in Psychology. In 2023, she is recently portrayed the main antagonist role as Alexandra "Alexa" Cardinal in The Seed of Love. In 2025, she recently played the main antagonist role as Via Almendras in Hating Kapatid.

== Biography ==
Valerie Concepcion was born as Valerie Norona Galang on December 21, 1987, in Tondo, Manila. She has one child.

While taping in a scene of the drama series Sinasamba Kita in 2007, she was accidentally run over by the stunt driver, damaging her lower back. She ended up shooting some scenes in the hospital. The ensuing incident was played according to the scene.

In August 2018, she got engaged to her long-time non-showbiz boyfriend, Francis Sunga. The two got married in December 2019.

== Filmography ==
=== Film ===
Year	Title	Role	Notes	Source
2003	Fantastic Man	Valerie	Credited as "Valerie Concepcion"	
2005	Mulawin: The Movie	Sang'gre Danaya		
2006	Moments of Love	Young Ceding	Credited as "Valerie Concepcion"	
2006	Pitong Dalaga	Tina		
2007	Angels	Leny		
2007	Ouija	Rape Victim	Credited as "Valerie Concepcion"	
2008	Anak ng Kumander	Rebel		
2008	Supahpapalicious	Athena		
2008	One Night Only	Vicky	Uncredited	
2012	Flames of Love	Carla	Also producer (as My Own Man)	
2015	Beauty and the Bestie	Edith Villavicencio		
2019	Marineros: Men in the Middle of the Sea		Credited as "Valerie Concepcion"	
2024	Hello, Love, Again	Jambi		

=== Television ===
Year	Title	Role
2002	Ang Iibigin ay Ikaw	Lilian Almendras
2003	Click	Yasmin
2003–07	Bubble Gang	
2003–04	All Together Now	
2003–04	Walang Hanggan	Almira Castelo
2004	Love to Love	Annaliza
2005	Now and Forever: Mukha	Karen
2006	Love to Love	Kaye
2006	Majika	Naryan
2006–07	Atlantika	Elisa
2007	Sine Novela: Sinasamba Kita	Nora Ferrer
2007	Fantastic Man	Agent Belle
2007–2010	Wowowee	Herself
2007–09; 2011–16	ASAP	Herself
2007	Maalaala Mo Kaya	Laura
2007	Your Song	Yna
2008	Your Song	Janna
2008	Maalaala Mo Kaya	Cara
2008	Love Spell	Pearl
2008	Banana Split	Herself
2009	Precious Hearts Romances Presents: Bud Brothers	Hiromi "Lady Tiger" Santa Maria
2010	Maalaala Mo Kaya	Ayra
2010	Your Song	College Girl
2010	Precious Hearts Romances Presents: Love Me Again	Preciosa "Precy" Pilapil
2010	Elena M. Patron's Momay	Libra Monte
2010	Pilipinas Win Na Win	Herself / Co-host
2011	Laugh Out Loud	
2011	Talentadong Pinoy	Judge
2011	Star Confessions: Bella Flores Story	Bella Flores
2011	Mga Nagbabagang Bulaklak	Violet Alindogan
2011	100 Days to Heaven	Miranda Salviejo-Ramirez
2012	Wansapanataym	Ms. Fajardo
2012	Maalaala Mo Kaya	Marie
2012	E-Boy	Karla Mariano
2012	Wansapanataym	Mrs. Perez
2012	Angelito: Ang Bagong Yugto	Emily
2012	Toda Max	Dianne
2012	Wansapanataym	Madame Sunshine
2013	May Isang Pangarap	Lorraine Castro
2013	Carlo J. Caparas' Dugong Buhay	Dolores "Dolor" Bernabe
2013	Wansapanataym	Mom of Diego
2013	Anna Karenina	Ruth Monteclaro-Barretto†
2013	One Day, Isang Araw	Sandra
2013	Genesis	Annicka de Guzman
2013	Vampire ang Daddy Ko	Holly
2013	Wagas	Yuri Bijasa
2013	Annaliza	Angelina "Gigi" Ramos
2013	Maalaala Mo Kaya	Judith
2014	Ipaglaban Mo	Auring
2014	Ismol Family	Marie
2014	My BFF	Lavander "Lav" Catacutan
2014	Wagas	Atty. Ipat Luna
2014	Elemento	Lucida
2015	Ipaglaban Mo	Norma
2015	Once Upon a Kiss	Minnie Servando-Rodrigo
2015	Kapamilya, Deal or No Deal	Herself / #18 Lucky Star
2015	FlordeLiza	Daisy Cruz-Hizon†
2015	Imbestigador	Mylene Angeles
2015	Karelasyon	Tere
2015–2016	Because of You	Veronica Sodico-Salcedo
2016	Karelasyon	Eva
2016	Ipaglaban Mo	Irene
2016	Maalaala Mo Kaya	Evelyn
2016	FPJ's Ang Probinsyano	Nurse Andrea
2016	Karelasyon	Joni
2016	Wish Ko Lang	Manilyn Malupa
2016	Maalaala Mo Kaya	Denise
2016–2017	Magpahanggang Wakas	Cassandra Flores
2017	Tadhana	Ara
2017	Mulawin vs. Ravena	Tuka†
2017	Alyas Robin Hood	Helga Montemayor†
2017	The Good Son	Young Doña Matilda Gesmundo
2018	Ipaglaban Mo!	Ning
2018	Tadhana	Rosa
2018	Magpakailanman	Linda
2018–19	Ika-5 Utos	Clarisse Alfonso-Buenaventura†
2019	Magpakailanman	Lelang
2019	Kadenang Ginto	Cindy Dimaguiba
2019	Maalaala Mo Kaya	Nanay
2019	Wowowin	Herself / Co-host
2019	Tadhana	Danica
2019	Imbestigador	Hazel
2020	Lunch Out Loud	Herself / Guest co-host
2021	Tadhana	Daisy
2021	Saying Goodbye	Olive
2022	Tadhana	Flor
2022	Raising Mamay	Sylvia Gonzales-Renancia
2022	Wish Ko Lang	Mylene
2023	The Seed of Love	Alexandra "Alexa" Cardinal
2023	Black Rider	Jamila Asuncion-Aguilero
2024	Love. Die. Repeat.	Gretchen Macalintal
2025–26	Hating Kapatid	Via Almendras

== Awards and nominations ==
Year	Award giving body	Category	Result	Source
2003	"Best New Female TV Personality"	Click	Won	
2008	"Best New Female TV Personality"	Click	Won	
2009	PMPC Star Awards for TV	Wowowee	Won	
