= Nonoy Zuñiga =

Filipino singer and physician

- Born: Zeno Obong Zuñiga; Manila, Philippines
- Origin: Manila, Philippines
- Genres: OPM; Manila Sound
- Occupations: Singer, actor, host, influencer, presenter, environment & PWD advocate, physician
- Instruments: Vocals, guitar
- Years active: 1971–present
- Spouse: Grace Maroket (separated since 2016)

Personal details
- Party: Lakas (c. 2001)
- Education: University of Santo Tomas (MD)

Nonoy Zuñiga (Tagalog: [ˈnɔnoɪ suˈɲɪga]) (born Zeno Obong Zuñiga) is a Filipino singer, actor, host, influencer, environment and PWD Advocate, television presenter and physician. Dubbed as the "Philippines' King of Pop Ballads" he released his debut album Ako Ay Ikaw Rin in 1981. It was both a critical and commercial success, reaching double Platinum in the Philippines and won "Album of the Year" at the Awit Awards & Cecille Awards. Also Aliw Award's "Entertainer of the Year"

== Career ==
Besides his musical career, he hosted a public service TV program called Kapwa Ko Mahal Ko on GMA, and an informational program called MedTalk with Dr. Z on IBC. He also heads EcoWise and NOW, two companies that deal with the preservation and conservation of the environment through proper waste disposal and the manufacture and marketing of organic products.

Zuñiga also unsuccessfully ran for councilor of Makati from the 1st district in 2001 under the Lakas–NUCD–UMDP banner, which was led by Vice Mayor Edu Manzano, who also lost his mayoralty bid.

== Personal life ==
Zuñiga is an amputee, having lost his right leg in a bombing incident in October 4, 1980, at the Philippine Plaza Hotel.

He has 5 children with non-showbiz wife Grace Maroket. He and Maroket live separately since 2016, citing third party as the main reason of their separation.

=== Education ===
Zuñiga studied at University of Santo Tomas and graduated with a degree of Doctor of Medicine.

== Discography ==
=== Studio albums ===
- Ako Ay Ikaw Rin (1981)
- Much More (1982)
- Live For Love (1983)
- Fragments Of Forever (1986)
- Feelin' It All (1986)
- Christmas With Nonoy (1987)
- Nonoy Zuñiga (1989)
- I Will Be There For You (1990)
- Timeless Classics (1992)
- Tinig Ng Langit (1994)
- Pure and Golden Love Songs (1997)
- The Duet Album (1998)
- Impressions (2001)
- The Love Album (2005, Viva Records)
- Beginnings (2017)

=== Compilation albums ===
- The Best of Love Duets (Viva Collection Forever) (1998, Viva Records)

=== Singles ===
- "Never Ever Say Goodbye" – 1981
- "Doon Lang"
- "Kumusta Ka"
- "Araw Gabi"
- "Love Without Time"
- "Live For Love"
- "Fragments Of Forever"
- "Init Sa Magdamag" (with Sharon Cuneta)
- "Pero Atik Ra" (with Jolianne Salvado, 2018)

== Filmography ==
=== Television ===
| Year | Title | Role | Notes |
|---|---|---|---|
| 1975–2001 | Kapwa Ko Mahal Ko | Himself (host) | |
| 2006 | MedTalk with Dr. Z | Himself (host) | |
| 2010 | Pilipinas Win Na Win | Himself (host) | |
| 2022–present | It's Showtime | Tawag ng Tanghalan judge | |

=== Film ===
| Year | Title | Role | Notes |
|---|---|---|---|
| 1981 | Kumusta Ka | | With Gina Alajar |
| 1982 | Never Ever Say Goodbye | | With Vilma Santos |
| 1983 | Init sa Magdamag | Singer as Himself | |

== Accolades ==
- 1981 Best Pop Male Vocal Performance by a New Male Artist Aliw Award
- 1981 Most Promising Entertainer Aliw Award
- 1982 Entertainer of the Year Aliw Award
- 1982 Album of the Year for the Album Ako Ay Ikaw Rin Aliw Award
- 1982 Golden Record Award for the Album Ako Ay Ikaw Rin Aliw Award
- 1982 Platinum Record Award for the Album Ako Ay Ikaw Rin Aliw Award
- 1982 Record of the Year for the Album Ako Ay Ikaw Rin Aliw Award
- 1982 Best Male Vocal Performer Guillermo Mendoza Foundation
- 1982 Mr. Popular Entertainer of the Year Guillermo Mendoza Foundation
- 1983 Ranked Top 6 Major Awards Cecil Award
- 1991 Best Male Vocal Performer Awit Award
- 1998 Most Outstanding Recording Artist Katha Award
- 1999 Best Performance by a Duet Awit Award
- 1999 Best Traditional Song Saan Ka Man Naroroon Awit Award
- 1999 Best Pop Vocal Collaboration Katha Award
- 2022 Dangal Ng Musikang Pilipino Award Winner Awit Award

== See also ==
- Rey Valera
- Rico J. Puno
- Marco Sison
- Hajji Alejandro
