= Marco Sison =

Filipino singer, actor, and politician (born 1957)

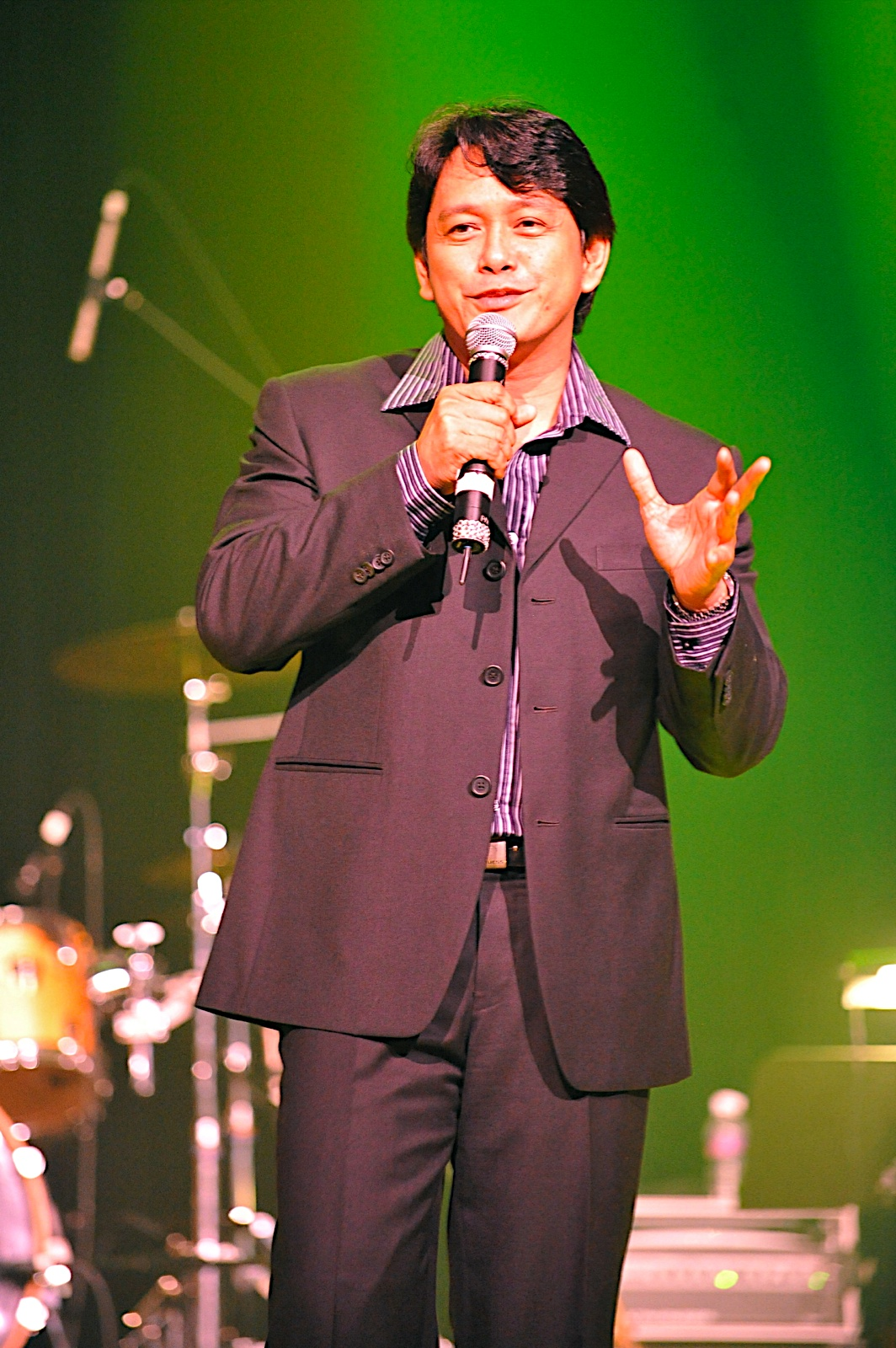
- Marco Sison singing in 2008

Background information
- Born: Raul Marco Sison; July 10, 1957 (age 68); Manila, Philippines
- Genres: Manila sound
- Occupations: Singer; actor; politician
- Instrument: Vocals
- Years active: 1978–present
- Labels: Vicor Music; Universal Records; Viva Records; Star Music; Alpha Music

Member of the Laguna Provincial Board
- In office June 30, 2004 – June 30, 2007
- Constituency: 1st district

Member of the Biñan Municipal Council
- In office June 30, 1995 – June 30, 2001

Personal details
- Party: Lakas–CMD

Raul Marco Sison (Tagalog pronunciation: [ˈsisɔn]; born July 10, 1957) is a Filipino singer, actor, and politician.

== Singing career ==
Sison started his singing career after his triumph on a singing contest on GMA Network's noontime variety show Student Canteen in the late 1970s and early 1980s. Being one of the classic balladeers to have captured the true vocal essence of Original Pilipino Music (OPM) in the '80s, Sison was responsible for the songs "My Love Will See You Through" (his biggest hit thus far), "Si Aida, Si Lorna, O Si Fe", "I'll Face Tomorrow", "Always" and "Make Believe".

In 1991, the Philippine independent record company, Universal Records, released Best of Marco Sison. The album consists entirely of romantic, easy-listening music, a style of music quite popular in the Philippines. In 1992, Sison released After All These Years. In 1999, Sison released Memories, his first album for local independent record company, Viva Music Group. One of the international hits covered by Sison in the said album is Crazy. The album also includes Someone That I Used To Love and Kung Maibabalik Ko Lang.

May Iba Ka Na Ba? is the first single lifted from Sison's comeback album, Hindi Ko Akalain, released by Star Records. The songs in the album perfectly capture that distinct OPM feel as proven in the tracks Hindi Ko Akalain, Baby, Puwede Ba?, Right Beside You, Try My Number and the lead single "May Iba Ka Na Ba?".

The singer was simply doing live performances both here in the country and abroad. Sison has been part of the touring group called The Greatest Hitmakers composed of veteran OPM artists Rico J. Puno, Hajji Alejandro and Rey Valera.

Aside from his hit-making albums, Sison also joined popular singers Rico J. Puno, Rey Valera and Nonoy Zuñiga, collectively known as the Hitmakers. Sison and the group had a successful series of shows abroad, most of them in the U.S. cities such as Reno, Houston and Las Vegas. Sison emerges on the release of his love ballad collection titled Isang Pagkakataon, distributed by PolyEast Records. The album has been preceded by other newly written songs by Vehnee Saturno like Selos, Kahit Na Minsan Pa, Sa Iisang Puso Mo and Kwento. It also features Sabik Na Puso, a song that was penned by Sison. Isang Pagkakataon features five new songs from Vehnee Saturno.

== Acting career ==
Aside from singing, Sison was also into movie acting. His first movie was a romantic comedy movie, Annie Batungbakal was released in 1979, then his follow up film the romantic drama Beautiful Girl by Seiko Films, released in 1990.

His second movie was José Rizal, where he plays national hero Pio Valenzuela who accompanied the titular national hero (played by Cesar Montano). It was released by GMA Films on June 12, 1998, during the Philippine Independence's 100th anniversary. The movie also won as Best Festival Movie in the 1998 Metro Manila Film Festival.

His third movie was the comedy film (and also his first) Who's That Girl, where he made his special participation in the film as a funeral singer.

== Political career ==
Sison served as a municipal councilor of Biñan for two terms. He initially planned to run for vice governor of Laguna in 2001, but decided to back out and support Board Member Dan Fernandez, who went on to win the election.

He then served as provincial board member from the 1st district of Laguna for one term from 2004 to 2007. In 2007, he ran for vice governor of Laguna as the running mate of incumbent Governor Teresita Lazaro, but lost to fellow Board Member Ramil Hernandez of the 2nd district. After his loss, he migrated to Los Angeles with his family.

== Personal life ==
Sison's son with Tess Salvador (member of a prominent clan), Alain Marco Salvador, is an actor and former member of That's Entertainment. One of his grandsons, Alain's son and teenage actor Andrei Sison, died in a car accident in Quezon City on March 24, 2023.

== Discography ==
- Best of Marco Sison (1991)
- After All These Years (1992)
- Memories (1999)
- Maghihintay Na Lamang (2000)
- Best of Marco Sison 2 (2004)
- Hindi Ko Akalain (2010)
- Isang Pagkakataon (2012)

== See also ==
- Pilipinas Win Na Win
- APO Hiking Society
