= Pokwang =

Filipino actress

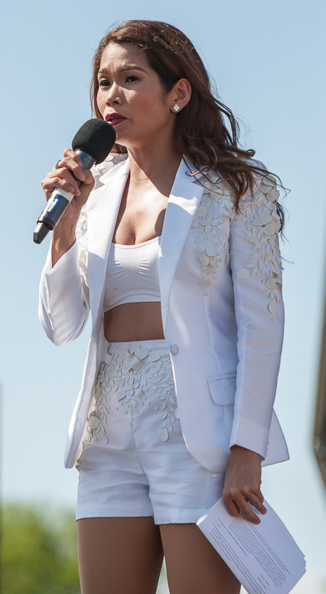
- Pokwang in 2014
- Born: Marietta Tan Subong; August 27, 1972 (age 54); Iloilo City, Philippines
- Occupations: Comedian; actress; television host; recording artist
- Years active: 1998–present
- Agents: Star Magic (2004–2020); APT Entertainment (2020–present); Sparkle GMA Artist Center (2021–present)
- Partner: Lee O'Brian (2015–2021)
- Children: 3

Marietta Tan Subong (born August 27, 1972), known professionally as Pokwang, is a Filipino comedian, actress, television host and singer.

She started in a reality show on ABS-CBN and subsequently appeared in dramas and sitcoms of the network. She also received the Best Comedy Actress award from the Philippine Movie Press Club for her portrayal in the sitcom Aalog-Alog and the Best Female Comedian award from People's Choice Awards. She became a host of the variety shows Wowowee, Pilipinas Win na Win and Happy Yipee Yehey.

== Early life ==
Pokwang was born as Marietta Subong on August 27, 1972 in Iloilo City. Her family lives in Antipolo, Rizal. Her father was an alcoholic and her mother had difficulties in raising Pokwang and her 11 other siblings. Pokwang was the seventh born among her siblings.

== Career ==
=== As a migrant worker ===
In 1990, Pokwang went to Japan as an Overseas Filipino Worker (OFW) and worked as a group dancer, going home to the Philippines four times within the two years time she worked in Japan. Her contracts in Japan were for six-months each. She saved money to renovate her family's fragile house to one made with sturdier materials. Pokwang also learned how to speak Japanese due to her work. She stopped working in Japan after she got pregnant which was also the time when Japan started to impose stricter regulations after following an issue with OFWs in Japan.

Pokwang went to Abu Dhabi in the United Arab Emirates to work as a domestic worker in 1998 after the gulf country started to accept OFWs. She worked in the country for six months. She wanted to go home immediately after she learned that her son who was then five years old was diagnosed with a brain tumor but her employer did not want to finance her plane ticket to fly back to the Philippines as she was still under contract. She was then forced to stay to raise funds herself. Her son later died while she was still in Abu Dhabi.

=== Return to the Philippines ===
Following the loss of her son, Pokwang decided to stay in the Philippines and tend to her daughter. Pokwang made her first appearance as a backup dancer in Eezy Dancing of ABC 5.

While performing as a guest in a comedy bar in Cubao, she met Eric Nicolas who was looking for a talent to work with ABS-CBN. She worked in a comedy bar named Funline and in 2002 moved to the Music Box. In 2004, Pokwang joined "Clown in a Million" a reality talent show segment of Yes Yes Show of ABS-CBN after she was convinced by Nicolas to participate and became the grand champion. After winning, she secured an exclusive artist contract with ABS-CBN.

Pokwang appeared in various dramas and sitcoms following her win at the reality talent show segment. She also had concerts both outside and within the Philippines and also had appeared in noon-time shows. She starred with other actors and actresses in various projects such as Dolphy which she considers her idol, Ai-Ai de las Alas, Willie Revillame, Piolo Pascual, Sam Milby, Claudine Barretto, Judy Ann Santos, Sharon Cuneta, and Kris Aquino.

She won the Best Comedy Actress award by the Philippine Movie Press Club for her portrayal in Aalog-Alog and the she garnered the Best Female Comedian award of the People's Choice Award. As a film actress she won the Bert Marcelo Lifetime Achievement Award twice.

Pokwang appeared in various films portraying supporting characters. Her first film where she portrayed a lead role was the 2011 film A Mother's Story, where she took up a role of an overseas Filipino worker named Medy.

In 2020, following the denial of ABS-CBN's franchise renewal, she signed to APT Entertainment and hosted two blocktime shows produced by APT, Chika, Besh! and Fill in the Bank. being aired on TV5.

In 2021, Pokwang officially signed up with Sparkle GMA Artist Center after weeks of speculation of her transfer to GMA Network.

In September 2024, Pokwang and her daughter Ria Mae opened a food business, Mamang Pokwang's Gourmet.

In July 2026, during the opening ceremonies of the 22nd edition of Cinemalaya, Pokwang told the press she could relate to her character in 2 Valid IDs (a film about a poor farmer struggling to get her remittance money because she doesn't have a valid ID). She added that she personally experience the same when she was applying as an entertainer in Japan.

== Comedic style ==
Pokwang prefers to use herself as a subject of her jokes rather than other people. She does not use "green jokes" (Filipino parlance for sexual innuendos) or devise other jokes more fit for a mature audience as she enjoys having children part of her audience.

Pokwang has also impersonated other people as part of her job as a comedian. Among the people she has impersonated were Dionisia Pacquiao such as for an episode in Banana Split and Anabelle Rama.

== Personal life ==
In 1993, Pokwang married a Japanese national who she had met while she was working abroad in Japan. The union had a son, Shin, born in 1995, who later died in 1998 due to a congenital brain ailment. The couple had become estranged for over a decade. In 2009, after 16 years, Subong's ex-husband contacted her in an effort to reconcile after he found out he had cancer. He also requested to view the grave of his son, to which Pokwang replied "He has forgiven you, he's an angel now.".

In 1996, she entered into another relationship again with a Japanese partner. Though they did not marry, the union had a daughter, Ria Mae (born 1996). Pokwang has since not spoken to her daughter's father, but harbors no ill will toward him, stating she is open to her daughter one day meeting with him. He found out about Pokwang's celebrity status via a mutual friend and through international media channels. In May 2014, Pokwang re-established contact with Ria Mae's father, who had since married and started a family, in an effort to have him appear at her debutante ball for her 18th birthday. Pokwang became a grandmother when Ria Mae gave birth to her first son in 2020.

Pokwang had another British boyfriend but in June 2013 it was reported that he decided not to pursue. Pokwang speculated that the reason for this was that she was "playing hard to get", but insists that she remains friends with her former partner.

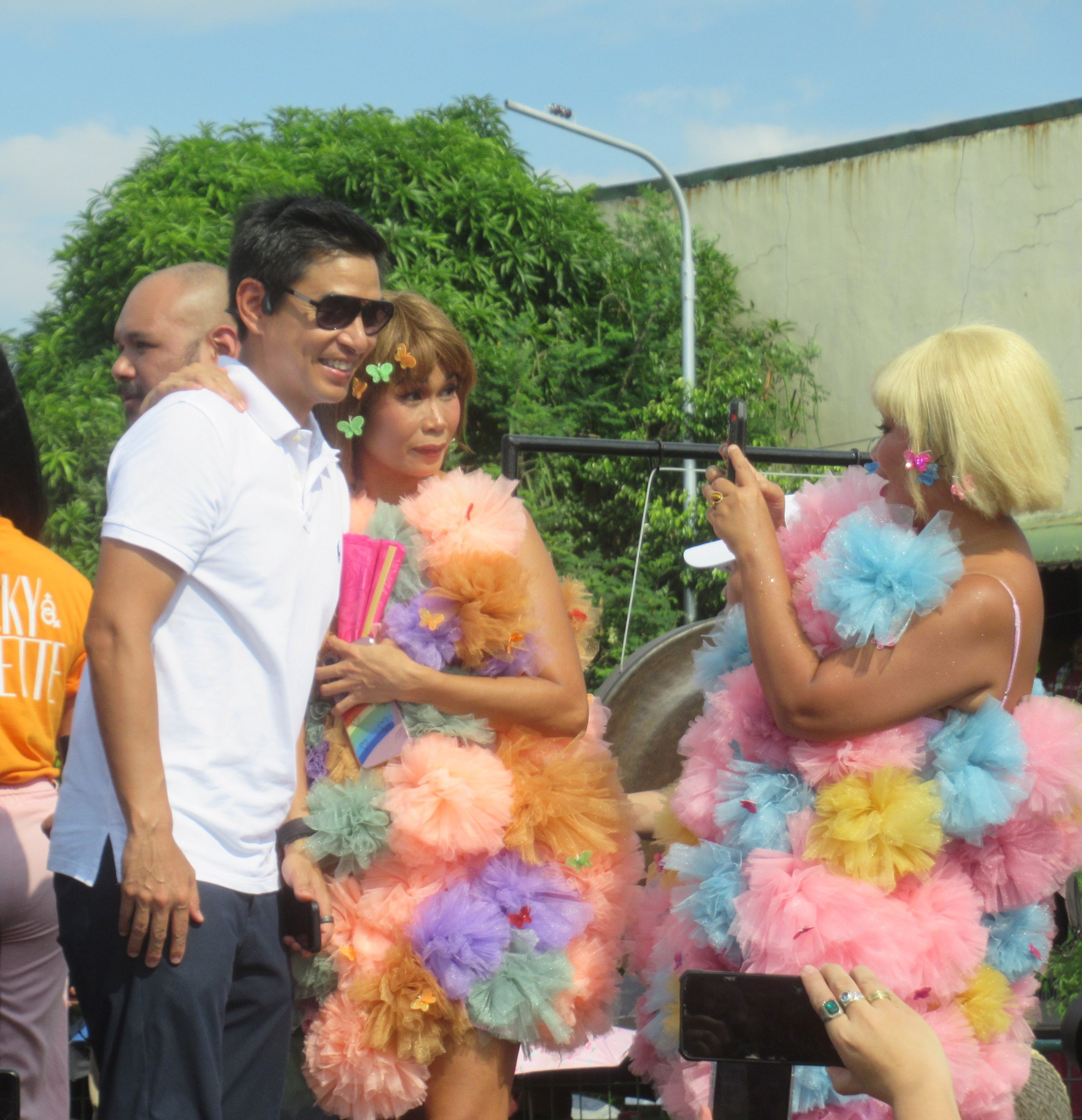
Pokwang (center) with co-star Eugene Domingo promoting Becky & Badette (2023)

On 20 January 2015, Pokwang entered into a relationship with American actor Lee O'Brian, whom she worked with in the film Edsa Woolworth which was released in theaters in that same month. She became pregnant, but miscarried after three weeks. By September 2016, she had been introduced to O'Brian's relatives and the two began talking about marriage. Nuptial planning was delayed as Pokwang's priority at the time was her project Till I Met You. On June 16, 2017, she announced on Twitter that she was seven weeks pregnant with O'Brian's child. On 18 January 2018, Pokwang gave birth to her third child and her first with O'Brian, Malia, in Antipolo. Pokwang and O'Brien separated in November 2021, with Pokwang having custody over Malia. She cited that they broke up due to her suspicions of O'Brien's financial mishandling of their joint business venture, as well as his defensive reaction over being confronted.

On June 13, 2023, Pokwang filed for O'Brien's deportation at the Bureau of Immigration, citing that he was only using a tourist visa while living and working in the Philippines for eight years. Alongside the filing, Pokwang complained of financial abuse, intimidation and abandonment of their daughters Malia and Mae. She hoped the filing would help her be "free" of O'Brien. Pokwang also accused O'Brien for being physically and mentally abusive and unfaithful during their relationship, and wanting to abort Malia when Pokwang was pregnant with her. Ria Mae also said O'Brien wanted her kicked out of their home when she announced her pregnancy. Pokwang won her deportation case in December 2023 after her complaint was approved, and the BI deported O'Brien in April 2024. O’Brian was also included in the BI’s blacklist and will not be able to return to the Philippines.

In December 2025, Pokwang publicly apologized on behalf of her family after her brother was caught in a viral video for slapping a man pushing a cart on the street during a heated altercation.

== Filmography ==
=== Film ===
Year	Title	Role
2004	Bcuz of U	Tiya Pards
2005	D' Anothers	Aruray "Balat" Paclayon
2005	Dubai	Cookie
2006	D' Lucky Ones	Lea
2007	Agent X44	Col. Cynthia Abordo
2007	Apat Dapat, Dapat Apat: Friends 4 Lyf and Death	Maria Ligaya "Gay" Kalungkutan
2008	Supahpapalicious	Nympha
2008	Dayo: Sa Mundo ng Elementalia	Vicky
2009	Nobody, Nobody But... Juan	Lolay
2010	Cinco	Emily
2010	I Do	Myka Punongbayan
2010	Super Inday and the Golden Bibe	Miss Kokay
2011	The Adventures of Pureza: Queen of the Riles	Sr. Purisima
2011	Pak! Pak! My Dr. Kwak!	Pining
2012	A Mother's Story	Remedios "Medy" Santos
2012	The Mommy Returns	Ruby Pascual-Martirez
2012	The Healing	Alma
2012	24/7 in Love	Virgie Cruz
2012	D' Kilabots Pogi Brothers Weh?!	Kitty Kilabot
2013	Bakit Hindi Ka Crush ng Crush Mo?	Cora Veloso
2013	Call Center Girl	Teresa "Terry" Damaso Manlapat
2014	My Illegal Wife	Clarissa "Clarise" Zabaldica
2015	Edsa Woolworth	Edsa Woolworth
2015	Wang Fam	Malou Wang
2015	All You Need Is Pag-Ibig	Teacher Corina
2016	Mercury is Mine	Carmen Batac
2018	Sol Searching	Lorelei Baloloy
2018	Oda Sa Wala	Sonya
2019	Mission Unstapabol: The Don Identity	Don Zulueta
2023	Ten Little Mistresses	Babet
2023	Becky & Badette	Badette Imaculada
2026	2 Valid IDs	Sylvia
TBA	The Sacrifice	Hilda

=== Television ===
Year	Title	Role
1998	Eezy Dancing	Herself
2004	Yes, Yes Show!	Herself
2004	Maid in Heaven	Harlene
2004	Maalaala Mo Kaya: Teddy Bear	Herself (as Marietta "Pokwang" Subong)
2004–2005	Krystala	Fantasia
2005	M.R.S. (Most Requested Show)	Herself/Host
2005	Pinoy Big Brother Buzz	Herself/Host
2006	Aalog-Alog	Etang Sukimura
2006	Komiks Presents: Da Adventures of Pedro Penduko	Principal Nendita
2006	Crazy for You	Bessie
2007	Love Spell: Shoes Ko Po, Shoes ko Day	Lisa
2007	Your Song: Breaking Up Is Hard To Do	Anna
2007	Ysabella	Phuket
2007–2010	Wowowee	Herself/Host
2007–2020	ASAP	Herself/Performer
2008	Maalaala Mo Kaya: Laruan	Rita
2009–2011	Banana Split	Herself/Various Characters
2009–2010	May Bukas Pa	Amy
2010	Melason In Love	Herself
2010	Your Song Presents: Love Me, Love You	Lovely
2010	Pilipinas Win Na Win	Herself/Host
2010	Your Song Presents: Kim	Belma Jolie
2011	Maalaala Mo Kaya: Singsing	Tita B. Canoy
2011	Maalaala Mo Kaya: Birth Certificate	Carol Araos
2011–2012	Happy Yipee Yehey!	Herself/Host
2011	100 Days to Heaven	Digna Amparo
2011–2013	Toda Max	Beverly "Lady G" Gil
2011–2016	Kris TV	Herself/Recurring co-host
2012–2013	Aryana	Ofelia Capuyao-Mendez
2013	Maalaala Mo Kaya: Gown	Linda
2013	My Little Juan	Sarah de Guzman
2013	Wansapanataym: Give Glove On Christmas Day	Queenie Batumbakal
2014	Maalaala Mo Kaya: Arroz Caldo	Mely
2014	Mirabella	Mimosa "Osang" Balete
2014	Ipaglaban Mo: Umasa Ako Sa Hula	Lovinia Ignacio
2014	Maalaala Mo Kaya: Alak	Lui
2015	Nathaniel	Elizabeth "Beth" Salvacion-Bartolome
2015	Wansapanataym: Raprap's Wrapper	Sioneng
2015–2017; 2018–2020	Banana Sundae	Herself/Various Characters
2015–2016	Celebrity Playtime	Herself/Player on TeamBuilding
2016	We Will Survive	Wilmalyn "Wilma" Bonanza-San Juan
2016–2017	Till I Met You	Agnes De Guia-Nicolas
2017	I Can Do That	Herself/Contestant
2017	FPJ's Ang Probinsyano	Amor Nieves
2018	Maalaala Mo Kaya: Eskoba	Azon
2018	Ipaglaban Mo: Teritoryo	Celia
2018	Maalaala Mo Kaya: Orasan	Fe
2019	Maalaala Mo Kaya: Divet	Diana Carbonell
2020	Make It with You	Jessica
2020	Eat Bulaga!	Herself/Guest Contestant
2020	Chika, Besh!	Herself/Host
2020	Fill in the Bank	Madam Poky/Host/Chismosang Falakang Officer
2021	Wanted: Ang Serye	Mary
2021	The Boobay and Tekla Show	Herself/Guest
2021–present	All-Out Sundays	Herself/Performer/Co-host/Various roles
2021	Wish Ko Lang	Virgie
2021	Dear Uge	Chit
2021	Mars Pa More	Herself/Guest
2021	Pepito Manaloto	Tarsing Batumbakal
2021	Daig Kayo ng Lola Ko: It's Not You, It's Me	Sunshine
2022	Regal Studio Presents: Yaya Terror	Yaya Mila
2022	Mano Po Legacy: Her Big Boss	Rebecca "Becca" Pacheco
2022	Lolong	Coring
2022–present	TiktoClock	Herself/Host
2023	Open 24/7	Gina
2024	Abot-Kamay na Pangarap	Herself
2024	Jose & Maria's Bonggang Villa	Tiffany Hambog
2024—present	It's Showtime	Herself/Guest/Performer
2025	Binibining Marikit	Mayumi Smith
2025	Stars on the Floor	Herself/Judge

== Discography ==
=== Albums ===
Title	Album information
Pokwang... Ang Album Na May Puso	Released: 2009; Format: mp3; Label: Star Music; Writer: Christian Martinez and Lito Camo; Chart position: N/A; Tracks: "GayaGaya Puto Maya," "Bratatat," "Bahoo," "Sana Kunin Ka Na Ni Lord"; Bonus tracks: "Hai"; Singles: "Sana Kunin Ka Na Ni Lord"

=== Singles ===
Compilation album

Release date	Album Title	Record Company	Song Title	Certification	Ref
November 12, 2011	Happy Yipee Yehey! Nananana!	Star Music	"No Boypren, No Problem"	PARI: Platinum	

== Awards and nominations ==
Year	Award giving body	Category	Nominated work	Results
2007	21st PMPC Star Awards for TV	Best Comedy Actress	Aalog-Alog	Won
2008	22nd PMPC Star Awards for TV	Best Female TV Host	Wowowee	Nominated
2008	22nd PMPC Star Awards for TV	Best Comedy Actress	That's My Doc	Nominated
2010	GMMSF Box-Office Entertainment Awards	Bert Marcelo Lifetime Achievement Award	—N/a	Won
2010	23rd Awit Awards	Best Novelty Recording	Bratatat	Nominated
2011	25th PMPC Star Awards for TV	Best Comedy Actress	Banana Split	Nominated
2012	26th PMPC Star Awards for TV	Best Comedy Actress	Toda Max	Won
2012	60th FAMAS Awards	Best Actress	A Mother's Story	Nominated
2012	25th Awit Awards	Best Novelty Recording	No Boypren, No Problem	Nominated
2013	27th PMPC Star Awards for TV	Best Comedy Actress	Toda Max	Nominated
2014	GMMSF Box-Office Entertainment Awards	Bert Marcelo Lifetime Achievement Award	—N/a	Won
2015	Golden Screen TV Awards	Outstanding Supporting Actress in a Drama Program	Mirabella	Nominated
2023	Metro Manila Film Festival	Best Actress	Becky & Badette	Nominated
