= Jefferson Utanes =

Filipino voice actor (1979–2025)

- Born: Jefferson Seril Utanes; June 9, 1979; Antipolo, Rizal, Philippines
- Died: December 16, 2025 (aged 46); Metro Manila, Philippines
- Resting place: Providence Memorial Park, Antipolo, Rizal
- Education: Victorino Mapa High School; Polytechnic University of the Philippines
- Occupations: Voice actor; ADR director
- Years active: 1997–2025
- Employers: ABS-CBN Corporation; GMA Network; TV5
- Spouse: Catherine Feliciano
- Children: 2

Jefferson Seril "Jeff" Utanes (June 9, 1979 – December 16, 2025) was a Filipino voice actor. He had provided voices for Filipino-language versions of Japanese anime series, cartoons, films and live-action programs from overseas. He was widely recognised as the second voice of Goku in the Dragon Ball franchise, replacing Nesty Ramirez, and he was nicknamed "Goku ng Pinas" (Goku of the Philippines).

Utanes had also voiced the titular character of Doraemon, Kogoro Mouri and Mitsuhiko Tsuburaya in Detective Conan, Professor Oak and James in Pokémon, Syaoran Li in Cardcaptor Sakura, Kouya Marino in Crush Gear Turbo, Yami Yugi in Yu-Gi-Oh! Duel Monsters, Kyon in The Melancholy of Haruhi Suzumiya, Kei Takishima in Special A, Germany and America in Hetalia: Axis Powers, Ryōta Kise in Kuroko's Basketball, Ben Tennyson, Kevin Levin, and Vilgax in Ben 10, Mr. Krabs in SpongeBob SquarePants, Hisoka in Hunter × Hunter, Ryomen Sukuna in Jujutsu Kaisen, Tenya Ida in My Hero Academia, and Ken "Okarun" Takakura in Dandadan.

== Career ==
In February 2024, Utanes expressed criticism on the House bill filed by then-Negros Occidental's 3rd congressional district representative Jose Francisco Benitez that bans Filipino dubbing on foreign shows and films. He asserted that the Philippine voice acting industry is responsible for translating and dubbing foreign programs and films for the mass audience so they can understand the original context.

== Personal life ==
Utanes was married to Catherine Feliciano, and they had two sons.

== Illness and death ==
Utanes died on December 16, 2025. He was diagnosed with stage 5 chronic kidney disease.

== Filmography ==
=== Voice acting ===
==== Animation ====
Original year (Note: Original airing date of media; not the dubbed version.)	Title	Role	Notes	Source
1979–2024	Doraemon	Doraemon	Also include the Stand by Me Doraemon films	
1996–2025	Detective Conan	Kogoro Mouri, Mitsuhiko Tsuburaya, Ninzaburo Shiratori		
1998–2000	Cardcaptor Sakura	Syaoran Li	ABS-CBN dub version	
1999–2025	SpongeBob SquarePants	Mr. Krabs, French Narrator, Realistic Fish Head, Kevin C. Cucumber, Flying Dutchman, Man Ray, Perch Perkins, Bubble Bass, Flats Flounder, Patchy the Pirate	Western animation	
2000–04	Yu-Gi-Oh! Duel Monsters	Yami Yugi, Noah		
2001–03	Crush Gear Turbo	Kouya Marino		
2004–06	Yakitate!! Japan	Narrator, Shigeru Kanmuri, Ken Matsushiro		
2004–08	Yu-Gi-Oh! GX	Sean Banzaime (Jun Manjoume)		
2006	We Were There	Motoharu "Moto" Yano		
2006–08	D.Gray-man	Allen Walker		
2006; 2009	The Melancholy of Haruhi Suzumiya	Kyon, Arakawa		
2008	Special A	Kei Takishima		
2009–10	Metal Fight Beyblade	Ginga Hagane		
2011–17	Mickey Mouse Clubhouse	Mickey Mouse, Goofy	TV5 dub	
2012–15	Kuroko's Basketball	Narrator, Ryōta Kise, Ryō Sakurai	Also served as ADR director	
2013–14	Free!	Seijūrō Mikoshiba, Momotarou Mikoshiba, Sōsuke Yamazaki	Seasons 1–2; also served as ADR director	
2014–15	Your Lie in April	Kousei Arima		
2016–25	My Hero Academia	Tenya Ida	Season 2	
2020–21	Jujutsu Kaisen	Ryomen Sukuna	Season 1	
2024–25	Dandadan	Ken "Okarun" Takakura	Seasons 1–2; final role	

=== Announcer ===
Year	Title	Notes	Source
2001–02	Family Feud	ABC-5 era only.	
2009–23	It's Showtime	Announcer for sponsors and some promotional segments.	
