= Wowowee =

Philippine noontime variety show

- Logo
- Genre: Variety show, comedy
- Created by: ABS-CBN Studios; Willie Revillame
- Developed by: ABS-CBN Studios; Edgar "Bobot" Mortiz; Willie Revillame
- Directed by: Bobet Vidanes; Johnny Manahan
- Presented by: Willie Revillame and others
- Narrated by: Peter Musñgi
- Theme music composer: Lito Camo
- Opening theme: "Wowowee" by Lito Camo "Wowowee" by Willie Revillame
- Country of origin: Philippines
- Original language: Filipino
- No. of episodes: 1,687 (313 [first iteration], 1,374 [second and third iteration])

Production
- Executive producers: Cynthia Jordan; Harold Nueva
- Production locations: Studio 3, ABS-CBN Broadcasting Center, Quezon City, Metro Manila, Philippines
- Running time: 90 minutes (weekdays, 2005–2006); 105 minutes (weekdays, 2006–2007); 120 minutes (Saturdays, 2005–2007); 150 minutes (Saturdays, 2006–2007; weekdays, 2007–2010); 180 minutes (Saturdays, 2007–2010; Mondays to Saturdays, 2010)
- Production companies: ABS-CBN Studios; Wil Productions, Inc. (now WBR Entertainment Productions Inc.)

Original release
- Network: ABS-CBN
- Release: February 5, 2005 – February 4, 2006 (first iteration)
- Release: March 11, 2006 – July 30, 2010 (second and third iteration)

Wowowee (Tagalog pronunciation: [ˌwaː.wɐˈwiː]) is a Philippine television variety show broadcast by ABS-CBN. Hosted by Willie Revillame, it premiered on February 5, 2005 and concluded on February 4, 2006 due to a stampede incident. The show returned on March 11, 2006 and concluded again on July 30, 2010.

== Hosts ==
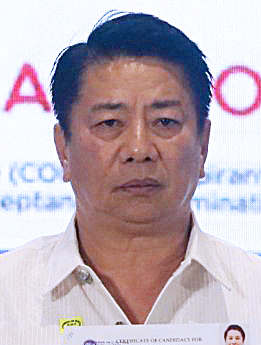
Willie Revilliame served as the host.

Main host

- Willie Revillame (February 5, 2005– February 4, 2006; March 11, 2006 – May 4, 2010)

Co-hosts

- Janelle Jamer (2005–07)
- Cheena Crab (2005–07)
- Iya Villania (2005–06)
- Kat Alano (2005–06)
- Mariel Rodriguez (2006–10)
- Valerie Concepcion (2007–10)
- Pokwang (2007–10)
- RR Enriquez (2008–10)
- Carmen Soo (2010)
- Max Collins (2010)
- Jed Montero (2010)
- Kelly Misa (2010)
- Janna Dominguez (2007–08)
- Precious Lara Quigaman (2007–08)
- Isabelle Abiera (2010)

Featuring

- Owen Ercia (Jimmy Santol)
- Wowowee Dancers (formerly ASF Dancers)
- ASF Boys
- Bentong
- DJ Mod (2005–07; 2010)
- DJ Coki (2007–10)
- Luningning (2008–10)
- Saicy Aguila (2008–10)
- Kembot Girls (2010)

Guest hosts

- Randy Santiago
- Amy Perez
- Korina Sanchez
- Maricel Soriano (2007)
- Roxanne Guinoo (2007)
- Mariana del Rio (2008–09)
- Priscilla Meirelles (2008–09)
- Ariana Barouk (2008–09)
- Sandra Seifert (2008–09)
- Nina Jose (2008–09)
- John Lloyd Cruz (2008, 2010)
- Yul Servo (2008–10)
- Zaijian Jaranilla (2009–10)
- Dolphy (2009–10)
- Gabby Concepcion (2009, 2010)
- Vice Ganda (2009)
- Kris Aquino (2005; 2008; 2009)
- Robin Padilla (2010)
- Billy Crawford (2010)
- Kim Atienza (2010)
- Luis Manzano (June to July 30, 2010)
- Cesar Montano (2010)
- KC Concepcion (2010)
- Dennis Padilla (2010)

== Segments ==
=== Final segments ===
- Cash Motto
- Hep, Hep, Hooray
- Willie of Fortune
- Cash Bukas
- Tic Tac to Win
- Tumpak o Sablay
- Jackpot Round

=== Discontinued segments ===
- "Bigtime" Pera O Bayong (2005–2008)
- Bigat-Ten (2005–2008)
- Act-U (2005)
- Call A Cookie (2005)
- Sketch on the Rocks (2005)
- Touch Ako (2005)
- Doblado Sigurado (2005–2006)
- Wowowin sa Wowowee! (2005–2006)
- Green Cross (2005)
- Huli Kaw! (2005)
- Isang Talon, Isang Sagot (2005–2006)
- Sinong Kumanta Ng Kantang To? (2006–2008)
- Tanong Ko, Sagutin Mo (2008)
- Pasalog (2006–2009)
- Guess the Presyo, Get the Premyo! (2007–2008)
- Wilyonaryo
- iYugYugan Na! (2007)
- Coca-Cola 50 Million Family Panalo: Cash o Bukas? (2008)
- Eight O'Clock (2009)
- Want More, No More (2009)
- May Regalo (2009)
- Samson, Lion, and Delilah (2010)
- Wil's Balls (2010)
- Cash Mo-Tour (2010)

== Special shows ==
=== World tours ===
Wowowee had broadcast episodes from other locations in the Philippines, and had also gone on world tours to other countries such as the United States (Atlantic City, San Francisco, New York City, Las Vegas, Los Angeles, Reno, Chicago, Honolulu, Atlantic City, San Diego, Houston, and Guam), Australia (Sydney), Canada (Winnipeg) and the United Arab Emirates (Dubai).

In 2007, Wowowee held a world tour, which consists of live shows in Reno, Nevada, Chicago, and Honolulu.

In celebration of The Filipino Channel's fifteenth anniversary and Wowowee's fourth anniversary, Wowowee held a grand world tour in 2009. Starting in Dubai, which dubbed as WowoWillie: Round the World...Touchdown in Dubai!, the tour reached Italy, United States (San Francisco, Seattle, Orlando and Las Vegas) and Canada (Toronto).

=== 2006: Alay sa Kapamilya ===
Alay sa Kapamilya was a program organized by ABS-CBN as an observance of sympathy for the PhilSports Arena stampede victims. It preempted Wowowee for six days from February 6 to 11, 2006 while the network decided over the fate of the variety show. The shows were a solemn tribute to the victims, featuring performances by ABS-CBN regulars. Eventually, ABS-CBN decided to pause the variety show's run with the timeslot temporarily occupied by Pinoy Big Brother: Celebrity Edition and a double-feature of Kapamilya Cinema until Wowowee's second iteration began on March 11, 2006.

== Ratings ==
During its three iterations, Wowowee was a major competitor to the long-running noontime show Eat Bulaga!. According to TNS National TV Ratings, Wowowee consistently reached ratings of 20% or higher and occasionally surpassed 30%. One such instance occurred in 2009, when host Willie Revillame returned to the show following a one-month sabbatical. The episode earned a 32.3% rating, outperforming Eat Bulaga!, which recorded 20.2%, by 12.1 percentage points.

== Cancellation ==
On July 27, 2010, ABS-CBN announced that Wowowee's third iteration from May 5, 2010 without the main host and the show's overall run would end on July 30.

The decision stemmed from Revillame's on-air demand during the May 4 episode for ABS-CBN to fire entertainment writer and then-DZMM radio host Jobert Sucaldito over the latter's constant criticisms directed at the show for allegedly auditioning students with below-average grades as contestants. It coincided with Eat Bulaga!'s 31st anniversary with Luis Manzano serving as guest host along with the erstwhile co-hosts reserving the last part of the show for an emotional farewell. As a result, Studio 3 of the ABS-CBN Broadcasting Center was then occupied by Pilipinas Win na Win.

Pilipinas Win Na Win took over Wowowee's slot the following day on July 31. The new show was hosted by Kris Aquino and Robin Padilla with Mariel Rodriguez, Pokwang, and Valerie Concepcion carried over as co-hosts.

== Controversies ==
=== ULTRA stampede ===
On February 4, 2006, Wowowee was to hold its first anniversary show at the ULTRA stadium when a stampede occurred at 6:00 a.m. PST resulting in 74 deaths and around 500 injured.

The incident was dramatized and investigated in the GMA Network-produced docudrama series, Case Unclosed as their 18th episode. The episode was aired on February 5, 2009, 3 years later after the incident.

=== Hello Pappy scandal ===
Willie Revillame reveals the two films inside the Violet wheel.

On August 20, 2007, during the Wilyonaryo segment, Willie Revillame looked for the ₱2 million jackpot prize in the violet wheel. However, he found out that there are two numbers in the wheel by pulling off the films. A later feud between Revillame and rival show Eat Bulaga!'s Joey de Leon led to this scandal.

=== 2009: Cory Aquino's wake ===
During the August 3, 2009, episode of Wowowee, live coverage of the transfer of former President Corazon Aquino's remains from La Salle Green Hills to the Manila Cathedral was inserted into the program's broadcast. During the episode, Revillame remarked that he could not make people happy while the country was mourning. The Alliance of Filipino Journalists denounced his remarks as a sign of disrespect towards Aquino. Revillame said he had no intention of defaming the former president and her family. ABS-CBN senior executive Cory Vidanes said that the network supported Revillame's action, stating that his outburst did not run afoul of the Broadcast Code of the Philippines. Network entertainment official Johnny Manahan said Revillame was correct in saying that the footage should not have been inserted, but the way he said it was wrong. On August 10, 2009, he took an indefinite sabbatical and returned on September 21 of the same year.

=== Revillame's row with Jobert Sucaldito ===
During the May 4, 2010 episode of Wowowee, Revillame threatened ABS-CBN that he will resign if the network would not fire entertainment writer and then-DZMM radio host Jobert Sucaldito over criticisms directed at the show for allegedly inviting students with below-average grades as contestants. Later that night in a TV Patrol World interview, Sucaldito responded that the criticisms he made were just his opinion. However, the row had sparked overwhelmingly negative reactions towards Revillame on social media sites such as Twitter calling for him to be fired.

Revillame then went on indefinite leave from the noontime show starting May 5 with the noontime show's staff and co-hosts vaguely stating that he was just "resting" but ratings had started to nosedive. During the height of the corporate discussions, Revillame penned a letter to ABS-CBN executives to release him from his contract that was then valid until September 2011; such letter was leaked on May 21, 2010, through The Philippine Star columnist Ricky Lo.

In an attempt to mitigate sagging ratings, ABS-CBN began fielding in guest-hosts that will helm the show for two-week shifts starting May 14, 2010 with the first being Robin Padilla. Fellow action star Cesar Montano took over on May 30, followed by the duo of Billy Crawford and Luis Manzano from June 14. ABS-CBN eventually settled with Manzano alone for the rest of the show's run on June 28, 2010

== Accolades ==
Accolades received by Wowowee
Year	Award	Category	Recipient	Result	Ref.
2005	KBP Golden Dove Awards	Best TV Variety Show	Wowowee	Won	
2005	PMPC Star Awards for Television	Best Male TV Host	Willie Revillame	Won	
2007	PMPC Star Awards for Television	Best Male TV Host	Willie Revillame	Won	
2007	PMPC Star Awards for Television	Best Female TV Host	Janelle Jamer	Won	
2008	PMPC Star Awards for Television	Best Variety Show	Wowowee	Won (tied with Eat Bulaga!)	
2008	Consumers Award	Outstanding Variety Show	Wowowee	Won	
2008	Consumers Award	Outstanding Male TV Host	Willie Revillame	Won	
2008	PMPC Star Awards for Television	Best Female TV Host	Valerie Concepcion	Won	
2009	PMPC Star Awards for Television	Best Variety and Game Show	Wowowee	Won	
2009	PMPC Star Awards for Television	Best Female TV Host	Valerie Concepcion	Won	
2010	PMPC Star Awards for Television	Best Variety and Game Show	Wowowee	Won	
