= My Illegal Wife =

2014 romantic comedy film by Tony Y. Reyes

- My Illegal Wife theatrical movie poster
- Directed by: Tony Y. Reyes
- Screenplay by: Danno Kristoper C. Mariquit
- Story by: Kriz G. Gazmen; Danno Kristoper C. Mariquit
- Produced by: Charo Santos-Concio; Malou N. Santos; Enrico C. Santos
- Starring: Pokwang; Zanjoe Marudo; Ellen Adarna
- Cinematography: Gary L. Gardoce
- Edited by: Chrisel G. Desuasido
- Music by: Jessie Lasaten
- Production companies: Star Cinema; Skylight Films
- Distributed by: Star Cinema
- Release date: June 11, 2014
- Running time: 109 minutes
- Country: Philippines
- Language: Filipino
- Box office: ₱80 million (estimated)

My Illegal Wife is a 2014 Filipino romantic comedy film directed by Tony Y. Reyes and written by Danno Kristoper C. Mariquit and Kriz G. Gazmen from an original concept developed by Wali Ching. Starring Pokwang and Zanjoe Marudo, the film follows a woman who wanted to have a husband but her wish came true when she took advantage to marry a man, a fellow survivor from a plane crash who got amnesia.

Produced by Skylight Films and distributed by Star Cinema, it was theatrically premiered in the Philippines on June 11, 2014.

== Cast ==
=== Main cast ===
- Pokwang as Clarissa "Clarise" Zabaldica
- Zanjoe Marudo as Henry James Acuesta
- Ellen Adarna as Clarize

=== Supporting cast ===
- Pooh as Alex
- Beauty Gonzalez as Donna
- Joy Viado† as Cora
- Anita Linda† as Magda Zabaldica
- Mikylla Ramirez as Hazel Zabaldica
- John Steven De Guzman as Liam Daniel Zabaldica
- Empoy Marquez as Anjo
- Edgar Allan Guzman as Brian
- Jimmy Santos as Zossimo Acuesta
- Pilita Corrales as Lala
- Jackie Aquino as Dr. Monch
- Hyubs Azarcon as Dennis
- Jobert Austria as Nelson
- Clayton Olalia as Husband Japanese of Donna
- Mae Paner as Madam (as Mae Paner aka Juana Change)
- Inday Garutay as Ice Cream Vendor
- Cloyd Robinson as Priest
- Grae Fernandez as Teen Henry
- John Bermundo as Teen Brian
- Jojo Bolado as OFW Passenger

=== The Bullies ===
- Justine Banez
- Joshua Claridad
- Ramon Dinglasan
- Ryu Nakayama
- Karlo Angelo Nunag

== Production ==
=== Casting and Development ===
On May 16, 2014, Star Cinema released news through their website about their next film, topbilled by Marudo and Pokwang with the title: "Coming soon: ‘My Illegal Wife’" and accompanied by a spoof image of ABS-CBN's The Legal Wife primetime series. They first introduced the cast, including Zanjoe Marudo, Pokwang, and Ellen Adarna as well as the storyline. The film, which started shooting on April 7, is their second film together after Cinco in 2010. In that case, both wanted to do more scenes that will show their improvement as a team, particularly having bed and love scenes on-screen.

The director noted that Marudo can be the next Vic Sotto, who is the "Prince of Comedy", as the director can see his skills on becoming like one. Coincidentally, Marudo is a fan of Sotto.

=== Promotions ===
The team had a story reference on March 28 under Skylight Films. During the reference, Pokwang promises that their team-up will bring laughter and kilig. One month when their first shoot on April 7 started, both the main actors excitedly posted exclusive sneak peeks on their Instagram accounts. In the same way, entertainment writer Mell Navarro posted a behind-the-scene photo of one of Pokwang and Marudo's scenes through his Facebook account on May 9.

On May 30, the full trailer of the film was uploaded in YouTube. The team, then, attended their grand press conference on June 2 at 11 a.m., accompanied by a livestream. In addition, the Marudo and Pokwang have had guestings in ABS-CBN to promote their upcoming film, including The Buzz, Gandang Gabi Vice, and ASAP, wherein they had a dance production number on the latter.

== Sources ==
There are numerous television and movies that the film used to spoof. In fact, their title is a spoof of ABS-CBN's The Legal Wife primetime series. Note that only the title is spoofed, not the storyline. Other sources parodied include:

- numerous scenes in Got to Believe series
- Kim Chiu's line: "Isn't it amazing, isn't it surprising" from Bride for Rent
- Bea Alonzo's rain scene in She's the One
- Sarah Geronimo in It Takes a Man and a Woman
- Piolo Pascual and Toni Gonzaga's confrontation scene in Starting Over Again
- Janet Lim Napoles as the head of Philippine-based Yakuza searching for 3 gold plates inserted in Henry's abdomen.
- Maja Salvador and Angel Locsin's slapping scene line: "Walang Sa'yo Nicole! Akin Lang ang ASAWA KO!"
