= Ellen Adarna =

Filipino actress and model (born 1988) Multi-media personality, brand endorser

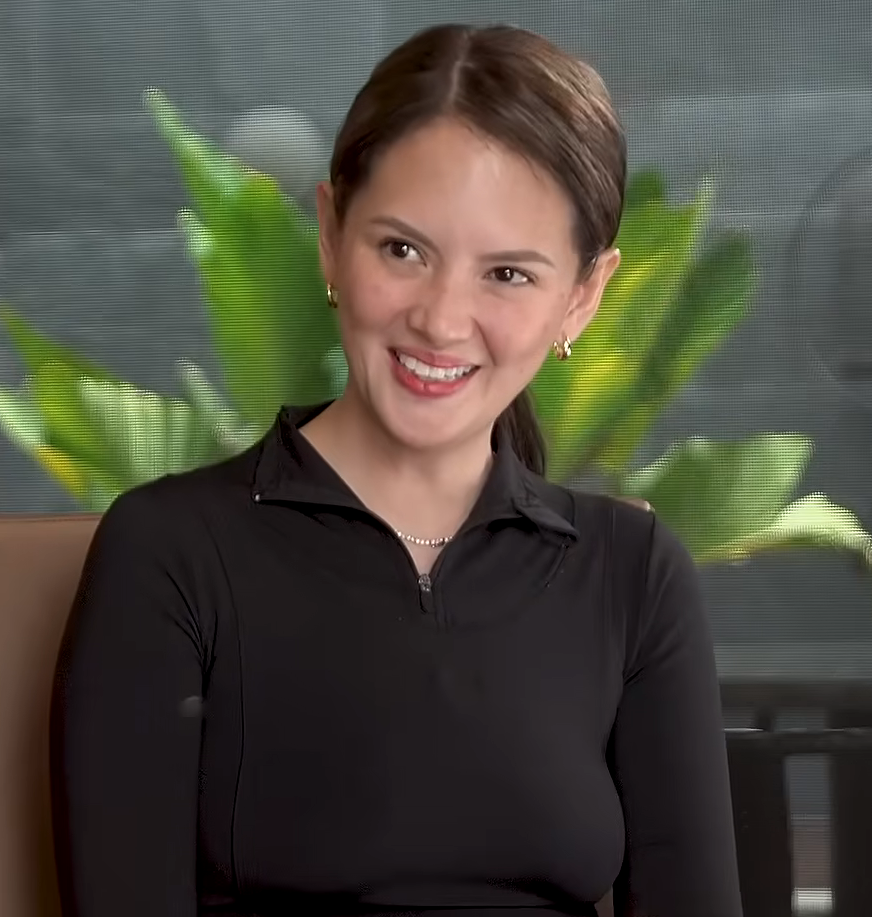
- Adarna in 2023
- Born: Ellen Meriam Go Adarna; April 2, 1988 (age 38); Cebu City, Philippines
- Other name: Maria Elena
- Education: Saint Theresa's College of Cebu
- Occupations: Actress; model Multi-media personality
- Years active: 2010–2023
- Agents: Sparkle GMA Artist Center (2010–2013); Icons Celebrity Marketing (2010–2013); Van Soyosa (2010–present)
- Spouse: Derek Ramsay (m. 2021; sep. 2025)
- Children: 2

Ellen Meriam Go Adarna (born April 2, 1988) is a Filipino former actress, model, and former internet celebrity. Her family owns various hotels, condominiums and Queensland and Madonna, a chain of motels in Cebu, Manila and Davao. They also own a temple in honor of her late grandmother (Temple Of Leah). A Gravure model, Adarna has appeared in various magazine covers in the Philippines, such as Candy, FHM, Esquire, UNO, Preview, Speed and Women's Health.

== Early life ==
Adarna is the eldest of five siblings. She completed her primary and secondary education at the premier, all-girls' Catholic school Saint Theresa's College of Cebu. Adarna took up Business Administration, but dropped out in her sophomore year. As a teenager, she graced the covers of Candy magazine for 2005 and 2006. Adarna briefly worked as a secretary at her dad's company before leaving Cebu for Manila, to pursue a career in the limelight.

== Career ==
=== Career beginnings and GMA Network: 2010–2013 ===
Adarna made her acting debut through the Philippine television's longest-running gag show, Bubble Gang, where she appeared as a regular until 2013. The series was well received from the public and garnered several awards, including Best Gag Television series. Meanwhile, in the film industry, she made her first appearance by starring in Si Agimat at si Enteng Kabisote (2010), playing only a minor role. Her career then went into expansion after she became part of the cast of Captain Barbell (2011) opposite Richard Gutierrez and Jillian Ward. Shortly after Captain Barbell, Adarna became part of Survivor Philippines: Celebrity Doubles Showdown (2011). She starred as herself and one of the Castaways of the series. She also made a cameo in the teen-oriented comedy drama film, Tween Academy: Class of 2012 (2011). The film was produced by GMA Films, and Adarna starred alongside Barbie Forteza, Bea Binene, Jake Vargas, and the likes.

She became part of the fantasy television series Alice Bungisngis and her Wonder Walis, in 2012, reuniting with her Tween Academy: Class of 2012 co-stars Derrick Monasterio and Lexi Fernandez. Adarna once again played a minor role in the film Boy Pick-Up: The Movie (2012), as one of the bombshells. After Alice Bungisngis and her Wonder Walis, she played a celestial clairvoyant in the primetime historical-cultural epic drama television series Indio (2013), playing a supporting character named Dalikmata. After portraying several supporting and minor roles in movies, Adarna played the title role in the indie film, Ang Tag-Araw ni Twinkle. She continued to take on a supporting role in the horror-themed movie Basement (2014), a film starring Betong Sumaya.

=== Transfer to ABS-CBN: 2013–14 ===
After being a GMA contract artist for three years, Adarna officially became a Kapamilya star after signing a contract with Star Magic in 2013. For her first ABS-CBN appearance, she became a contestant of the singing competition game show The Singing Bee (2014) and started as a performer on ASAP (2014–present). Being a new transferee, Adarna guested on several interview series including The Buzz (2014). She later on guested on Vice Ganda's talk show Gandang Gabi, Vice! (2014).

Adarna got her first Kapamilya teleserye while starring in the science fiction romance television series Moon of Desire (2014). Adarna played the role of Tamara Herrera, the main antagonist. The series premiered on ABS-CBN's Kapamilya Gold afternoon block on March 31, 2014, and concluded on August 15, 2014, with a total of 97 episodes. In the series, Adarna starred alongside Meg Imperial, JC de Vera, and Dominic Roque. After Moon of Desire, Adarna made her leading role in the comedy romantic movie My Illegal Wife. The film was produced by Star Cinema. Adarna then starred in Beauty in a Bottle (2014) with Angelica Panganiban and Angeline Quinto.

=== 2015–present: Breakthrough with Pasión de Amor and hiatus ===
In June 2015, she became part of the critically acclaimed primetime drama Pasión de Amor, a Philippine remake and adaptation of the 2003 Columbian erotic drama Pasión de Gavilanes. She starred opposite leading men, Jake Cuenca, Ejay Falcon, and Joseph Marco. Adarna was paired up with Ejay Falcon and the two made headlines as Sari (Adarna) and Oscar (Falcon). The series ended in February 2016. While doing Pasión de Amor, Adarna was part of You're Still the One, playing the role of Racquel, the woman who Jojo (Dennis Trillo) is engaged to.

Adarna reunited with Ejay Falcon for a second series together, while starring in The Greatest Love (2016). She played the role of young Gloria who appears in flashbacks when adult Gloria (Sylvia Sanchez) remembers her past with Peter (Ejay Falcon), because of the effects of her Alzheimer's disease. Adarna then became part of Langit Lupa, playing the role of Isa Sobrevista, the main antagonist. She is currently on hiatus since 2018.

== Filmography ==
=== Film ===
Year	Title	Role
2010	Si Agimat at si Enteng Kabisote	Engkantada #2 / Aryanna
2011	Tween Academy: Class of 2012	Cameo
2011	My House Husband: Ikaw Na!	Bank Teller
2012	Boy Pick-Up: The Movie	Bombshell 2
2013	Ang Tag-Araw ni Twinkle	Twinkle
2014	Basement	The Victim
2014	My Illegal Wife	Clarize
2014	Beauty in a Bottle	Tanya Jacinto
2015	You're Still the One	Racquel
2016	Dukot	ATM Victim
2017	Moonlight Over Baler	Aurora / Rory

=== Television ===
Year	Title	Role
2010	Asar Talo Lahat Panalo!	Host
2010–2013	Bubble Gang	Various Roles
2011	Captain Barbell: Ang Pagbabalik	Katrina "Kat" Lazatin / Fuega
2011	Survivor Philippines: Celebrity Doubles Showdown	Herself/"Castaway"
2012	Alice Bungisngis and her Wonder Walis	Carla
2013	Indio	Dalikmata
2013–2014	Annaliza	Maria Diana "Ana" Ramirez
2014	Moon of Desire	Dra. Tamara "Tammy" Herrera
2015–2023	ASAP	Performer
2015–2016	Pasión de Amor	Sarita "Sari" Elizondo-Samonte
2016	The Greatest Love	young Gloria Guerrero-Alegre
2016	Banana Sundae	Guest
2016–2017	Langit Lupa	Isadora "Issa" Sobrevista
2016–2018	Home Sweetie Home	Tanya
2017	Wildflower	young Esmeralda De Guzman-Ardiente
2017	Wansapanataym: The Amazing Ving	Super Bing
2017	Ipaglaban Mo: Bihag	Cherry
2020	Fit for Life	Guest
2021	John en Ellen	Ellen Kulantong
2021	Bawal na Game Show	Contestant

=== Music videos ===
Year	Title	Artist
2014	"Ikot"	The Oktaves

== FHM rankings ==
FHM Philippines
Year	Rank	Note
2011	10	
2012	6	
2013	8	
2014	7	
2015	3	
2016	11	
2017	5	

== Personal life ==
Ellen Adarna married Derek Ramsay on November 11, 2021. She has a son, Elias Modesto with John Lloyd Cruz. Ramsey revealed on December 11, 2023, that Adarna had a miscarriage. Adarna gave birth to their daughter named Liana Del “Lili” in October 2024.
