= List of Mga Kuwento ni Lola Basyang episodes =

The following is the list of episodes for Mga Kuwento ni Lola Basyang (The Folktales of Grandma Basyang), a Filipino live-action children's television anthology series. The series is a retelling of the popular Severino Reyes' classic tales. It headlines Manilyn Reynes as Herbie, Lola Basyang's compassionately strong-willed and high-spirited granddaughter who has made it her personal advocacy to disseminate Lola Basyang's stories; and Paul Salas as Herbie's eight-year-old son Efren. Together, they drive around in a "rolling library" packed with Lola Basyang's books and goes to various places to spread Lola Basyang's classic tales and golden values.

The series was originally aired weekly on GMA Network from February 4, 2007 to August 12, 2007 with the total of twenty-six episodes. It was also aired in GMA Pinoy TV from 2007 to 2008.

The series won Best Children's Program in 2007 by Catholic Mass Media Awards.

== Series overview ==
Season	Episodes	Originally released	
Season	Episodes	First released	Last released
1	13	February 4, 2007	May 6, 2007
2	13	May 13, 2007	August 12, 2007

== Episodes ==
=== Season 1 ===
No. overall	No. in season	Title	Written by	Original release date	Prod. code
1	1	"Ang Mahiwagang Kuba (The Enchanted Hunchback)"	Agnes de Guzman	February 4, 2007	0101
Prince Jorge (Patrick Garcia) is an enchanted prince, who was cursed to become a hideous hunchback until a beautiful lady with a golden heart gives her love to him. In his quest for this beautiful lady, he meets Princess Lucinda (Desiree del Valle), who promises to marry anyone who can heal the ailing king. He also meets a kind-hearted beggar named Feli (Jennylyn Mercado), who helps him without expecting anything in return. The episode also starred Eddie Gutierrez as Haring Enrico, Bing Davao as Haring Teoderico, Raquel Montesa as Ludriya, and Jaime Fàbregas as Ministro.
2	2	"Ang Prinsipeng Unggoy (The Monkey Prince)"	Dinno Erece	February 11, 2007	0102
The story revolves around a prince (Mark Herras) who looks just like a monkey falls in love with a beautiful princess (Katrina Halili) when they exchange letters. The episode also starred Cherry Pie Picache as Binday, and Joel Torre as Tinong.
3	3	"Ang Parusa ng Duwende (The Dwarf's Punishment)"	Adrian Ho	February 18, 2007	0103
The story revolves around the naughty and hard-headed Tias (Francis "Iking" Magundayao) who was punished by a duwende (dwarf or hobgoblin) after the boy destroyed the spirit's kingdom (an anthill or termite mound). The episode also starred Bearwin Meily as Empoy, Joey Marquez as Mang Dencio, Jean Garcia as Aling Tona, and Boy Alano as Ka Huling.
4	4	"Ang Binibining Tumalo sa Mahal na Datu (The Maiden Who Defeated the Datu)"	Agnes de Guzman	February 25, 2007	0104
The beautiful and intelligent Sharay (Rhian Ramos) is every man's dream girl. In their kingdom, men compete to win her heart, including Prince Arando (Paolo Contis), the son of Datu Abdul (Eddie Garcia). But Sharay is the daughter of a slave, and the kingdom's laws ban intermarriage amongst different social classes. After unsuccessfully trying to separate the couple, Datu Abdul subjects Sharay to many various trials. The episode also starred Menggie Cobarrubias as Tasan, Simon Ibarra as Lamukot and Megan Young as the fairy.
5	5	"Ang Mahiwagang Biyulin (The Enchanted Violin)"	Dinno Erece	March 4, 2007	0105
A young man named Rodrigo (Ogie Alcasid) has been working for his master Ahab (Leo Martinez) for a long time, and he has never received any compensation for it. No matter how many times he asks for his salary, his master never pays him any attention. The young man helps an old woman, who rewards him with a magical violin. The episode also starred Dino Guevarra as Diyunyor, Perla Bautista as Tandang Epang, Benj Pacia as Silvestre, Tommy Abuel as Tulome, and Ces Quesada as Toyang.
6	6	"Ang Prinsipeng Mahaba ang Ilong (The Prince with a Long Nose)"	Dinno Erece	March 11, 2007	0106
Isabela (Iza Calzado) was the most beautiful princess in the land, and King Anselmo (Emilio Garcia) was her most ardent suitor. Due to a curse, the princess wasn't allowed to fall in love with anyone. Anselmo tried to help the young princess, but it ended another curse befalling the princess and the King as well. The episode also starred Alfred Vargas as Benito, Ian Veneracion as Haring Arturo, Jennifer Sevilla as Reyna Elyana, and Arthur Solinap as Prinsipe Kael.
7	7	"Ang Sumpa ng Higanteng si Amok (The Curse of Amok the Giant)"	Adrian Ho	March 18, 2007	0107
The tale is about a kingdom, whose people do not value the idea of cleanliness. Due to their unsanitary way of living, a giant named Amok will punish them. The episode starred JC de Vera as Prinsipe Mansino, Isabel Oli as Selinda, BJ Forbes as Almion, Benjie Paras as Higanteng Amok, JM Reyes as Higanteng Bata, and Webster Villanueva as Mahala.
8	8	"Ang Walong Bulag (The Eight Blind Men)"	Agnes de Guzman	March 25, 2007	0108
The story centers on the eight blind men and their misadventures. The episode starred Luis Alandy as Bulag 1, Caloy Alde as Bulag 2, Mang Enriquez as Bulag 3, Andrew Schimmer as Bulag 4, John Feir as Bulag 5, Coco Martin as Bulag 6, Gene Padilla as Bulag 7 and Epi Quizon as Bulag 8, Mike "Pekto" Nacua as Pilay, Dick Israel as Kapitan Chimo, and Dwight Gaston as Ginoong Lucio
9	9	"Ang Prinsipeng Duwag (The Cowardly Prince)"	Agnes de Guzman	April 1, 2007	0109
Nobody knew that Prince Marko (Boy2 Quizon), the son of the brave king, was in fact a coward. He immediately flees from enemies, until one day they capture his wife and father-in-law. The episode also starred Marian Rivera as Prinsesa Maria, Gabby Eigenmann as Prinsipe Gandor, Dolphy as Haring Len, Maita Soriano as Reyna Celia, and Archie Adamos as Haring Ramon.
10	10	"Akong Ikit"	Dinno Erece	April 15, 2007	0110
The story centers on a brave man named Akong Ikit and his adventures. The episode starred Marky Cielo as Akong Ekit, Glaiza de Castro as Prinsesa Zelma, Nanding Josef as Tandang Selo, Chanda Romero as Aling Gloria, Juan Rodrigo as the Sultan ng Jolo, Al Tantay as Sultan ng Borneo, Chris Martin as the Prinsipe ng Borneo, and Dillan Maris Yraola as Jef Jef Pilagagay.
11	11	"Maria Alimango"	Dinno Erece	April 22, 2007	0111
Maria Alimango is the Filipino analogue of the European fairy tale, Cinderella. Maria Alimango is the beautiful and kind orphan girl who is saved by a giant crab. The episode starred Lovi Poe as Maria Alimango, Prince Stefan as Sancho Ga-el.
12	12	"Si Sultan Saif (Sultan Saif)"	Dinno Erece	April 29, 2007	0112
Sultan Saif disguised himself a beggar to find out whether the true value of a person is measured by his gold and opulent lifestyle. The episode starred Mark Anthony Fernandez as Sultan Saif, Vandolph Quizon, Victor Neri, Gigeth Reyes, and Berting Labra.
13	13	"Ang Prinsipe ng mga Ibon (The Prince of the Birds)"	Dinno Erece	May 6, 2007	0113
Prinsesa Singsing (Iwa Moto) has a secret lover named Prinsipeng Ibon Dion Ignacio. Later on, the princess tells her father, Haring Tongkiang (Pen Medina), about her affair. The king is furious as he does not want his daughter to marry a bird. The episode also starred Anton Bernardo as Tesurero.

=== Season 2 ===
No. overall	No. in season	Title	Written by	Original release date	Prod. code
1	1	"Si Pedrong Walang Takot (Fearless Pedro)"	Agnes de Guzman	May 13, 2007	0201
The story revolves around a brave man named Pedro (Mart Escudero). Pedro seems to not know what being afraid means. Until he meets his match. The episode also starred Tony Mabesa as Mang Huwan, Ronnie Lazaro and Sylvia Sanchez.
2	2	"Ang Gwapong Sastre (The Handsome Tailor)"	Adrian Ho	May 13, 2007	0202
The story centers on Adelino (JC de Vera) is the most handsome tailor in the land, but it seems as if his reputation is not enough for him. He deceives and manipulates his way into becoming a prince! The episode also starred Marco Alcaraz, Mike "Pekto" Nacua and Toby Alejar.
3	3	"Ang Palasyo ng mga Duwende (The Palace of the Dwarves)"	Agnes de Guzman	May 27, 2007	0203
A story of a young woman named Yani (Rich Asuncion), whose heart is as beautiful as her appearance. When her mother died, her father remarried. Her step-mother and step-sister were both envious of her beauty that they did everything to make her life unbearable, especially when her father died. The episode also starred John Arcilla as Lard, Karel Marquez as Lota, Mike Tan as Itar, Chuck Allie as Tu-wa, Jan Manual as Antok, and Gigette Reyes as Himpaya.
4	4	"Ang Kapatid ng Tatlong Maria (The Brother of the Three Marias)"	Agnes de Guzman	June 3, 2007	0204
This is a story of a man who dreamed of a better life. Soon, the man became greedy and for this he was punished. His three daughters were taken from him as the consequence of his evil actions. He soon had another child, this time a boy. Before his death he requested that his son should find his sisters who were now wives of beastly animals. The episode starred Aljur Abrenica as Pedro, Jackie Rice as Maria Trining, Kris Bernal as Maria Upeng, and Ailyn Luna as Maria Loleng.
5	5	"Ang Hukbo ni Padre Pedro (The Legion of Father Pedro)"	Dinno Erece	June 10, 2007	0205
The story centers in a brave little kid named Huse (Steven Claude Goyong) and his fight against Aswang. The episode also starred Paulo Avelino as Lucio, Kiko Junio as Mario, with Ana Capri as Maria and Allan Paule as Padre Pedro.
6	6	"Ang Plautin ni Periking (The Flute of Periking)"	Adrian Ho	June 17, 2007	0206
In the story, Periking (Eissen Bayubay) feels out of place with his brothers because of a huge age gap, but when the older brothers are the ones who need his help, it is up to Periking to save the day. The episode also starred Mark Gil, Vaness del Moral, Buboy Villar and Jan Manual.
7	7	"Anting-anting (The Amulet)"	Agnes de Guzman	June 24, 2007	0207
The story centers on very handsome and very conceited, but very cowardly, Huwan (Polo Ravales). Huwan the coward needs to get an enchanted amulet to help him get Meling’s approval. The episode also starred Karen delos Reyes, John Feir, Mang Enriquez and Joy Viado.
8	8	"Ang Mahiwagang Balabal (The Enchanted Cape)"	Agnes de Guzman	July 8, 2007	0208
The story revolves around the brave young lad named Ali (JC de Vera) and his adventures. The episode also starred Rhian Ramos, Stef Prescott and Mon Confiado.
9	9	"Ang Dragon sa Ilog Lingwa (The Dragon in Lingwa River)"	Dinno Erece	July 15, 2007	0209
The story centers on Tiago (Marco Alcaraz) and his quest to defeat the dragon of Lingwa River.
10	10	"Pandakotyong"	Agnes de Guzman	July 22, 2007	0210
Pandakotyong (Rainier Castillo) is a midget who wishes to prove he can be something more than a stay-at-home freak. When Pandakotyong aspires to give his mother a better life and when he falls in love with a princess, he becomes the source of courage and hope of everyone. The episode also starred Renee Lascuña, Kris Martinez, Mike Magat and Anne Villegas.
11	11	"Ang Kastilyong Bakal (The Iron-made Palace)"	Adrian Ho	July 29, 2007	0211
This is the story of the Princess Olivia (Valerie Concepcion) and Prince Agaton (Carlo Aquino), young lovers who are separated by the jealous sorcerer Serpenton (Sid Lucero). With only his ingenuity and a few choice items from the elders of his kingdom, Prince Agaton goes on a journey to save the love of his life.
12	12	"Prinsesang Kalbo (The Bald Princess)"	Dinno Erece	August 5, 2007	0212
Prinsess Natalia (Jewel Mische) is blessed with a kind heart, but the only negative thing about her is that she grew up with no hair on her head. The poor princess was banished because of this, but later on she will meet a young gentleman who will give her the love she deserves. The episode also starred Aljur Abrenica as Carlos, and Chynna Ortaleza as Uraka.
13	13	"Ang Pitong Hilo (The Seven Idiots)"	Dinno Erece	August 12, 2007	0213
This is a story about the seven men (Dino Guevara, Bearwin Meily, Goms, Gary Lim, Gene Padilla, Babyface and Caloy Alde) who are susceptible to being conned. Simple-minded to a fault, the seven are taken in by a kind couple only to learn that their lives are about to be more difficult with the presence of these men. The episode also starred Boy Alano as Tandang Tano, and Tiya Pusit as Rosing.
