= Ngayon at Kailanman =

Ngayon at Kailanman may refer to:

- "Ngayon at Kailanman" (song), a song originally sung by Basil Valdez
- Ngayon at Kailanman (2009 TV series), a Philippine telenovela aired on GMA Network
- Ngayon at Kailanman (2018 TV series), a Philippine telenovela aired on ABS-CBN
