= Isteri Halal =

2023 Malaysian television series

- Promotional poster
- Genre: Melodrama; Romantic; Revenge; Tragedy
- Created by: Radius One Sdn. Bhd
- Based on: The Legal Wife by Henry King Quitain & Jay Fernando
- Written by: Suzanna Zaily Zin; Shaza Talib; Pahzai Al-Khaired
- Directed by: Uchee Fukada; Nizam Zakaria
- Starring: Isyariana; Aidit Noh; Uqasha Senrose; Nazim Othman; Azhan Rani
- Theme music composer: Amylea Azizan
- Opening theme: Biar Sendiri - Dinda Permata (Episode 1-45); Miris - Amylea Azizan (Episode 46-70)
- Ending theme: Miris - Amylea Azizan
- Country of origin: Malaysia
- Original language: Malay
- No. of episodes: 70

Production
- Running time: 42 minutes
- Production company: Radius One Sdn. Bhd

Original release
- Network: Astro Ria (Slot Tiara)
- Release: 27 February – 2 June 2023

Related
- The Legal Wife

Isteri Halal (English: Legal Wife) is a 2023 Malaysian television series starring by Isyariana, Aidit Noh, Uqasha Senrose and Nazim Othman. It is a remake from the Philippine series titled "The Legal Wife". It was aired on Astro Ria, every Monday to Friday, 18:00.p.m (MST) that was broadcast on February 27, 2023, to June 2, 2023.

== Synopsis ==
The story tells about a romance between Adellia with Zayn which is opposed by Adellia's parents based on the wealth gap.

For the sake of her love, Adellia is willing to leave the luxury of her life and betray her family's choice to sail the ark of marriage with a poor man who does not have a high social status.

Everything started to change when his father, Tuan Aziz fell ill and needed attention. Determined to make amends, Adelea returned to her family with her husband. But Adellia's return invites a thousand and one guesses, including the scene of lies that happened between her husband and her best friend, Eyra, who harbored feelings of love for Zayn all this time. The situation becomes more tense with the presence of Daniel who wants to take revenge for what Adellia did to him. Daniel and Eyra conspire to trap Adellia in a club, "Blueboy Club".

With various guesses to come, will Adellia be able to survive everything and save the marriage that has been the heart of her life for so long?

== Cast ==
=== Main ===
- Isyariana as Adellia
- Aidit Noh as Zayn
- Uqasha Senrose as Eyra
- Nazim Othman as Daniel
- Azhan Rani as Dr. Farhan

=== Supporting ===
- Datin Sharmaine Farouk as Suraya
- Sahronizam Noor as Aziz
- Qazem Nor as Arif
- Shahidan Izwan as Aqil
- Nazzaty Rusli as Juliza
- Aishah Atan as Mak Pah
- Isaac Iman as Adrian
- Zarif Ghazzi as Zahir
- Elly Suhaili as Fauziah
- Rasya Dean as Thalia
- Amylea Azizan as Noor
- Faizul Syaharin as Ridwan
- Hariz Hamdan as Nabil
- Roy Azman as Tan Sri Hanif
- Shazia Rozaini as Suraya
- Riz Amin as Malek
- Hasnah Hashim as Mak Nek
- Zarina Zainoordin as Maria
- Adam Shahz as Encik Syukri
- Shyrim Husni as Rashid
- Zarynn Min as Bedah
- Amirul Asyhwad as Sean
