= Temple of Leah =

Memorial building in Cebu, Philippines

- Temple of Leah's exterior
- Interactive map of the Temple of Leah area

General information
- Architectural style: Roman
- Location: Cebu Transcentral Highway, Barangay Busay, Cebu City, Cebu, Philippines
- Coordinates: 10°22′08″N 123°52′24″E
- Named for: Leah Albino-Adarna
- Year built: 2012
- Owner: Adarna family

Technical details
- Material: Cement, concrete with reinforced steel, wood
- Floor area: 4,992 m^{2} (53,730 sq ft)
- Grounds: 5,140 m^{2} (55,300 sq ft)

The Temple of Leah is a memorial located on Cebu Transcentral Highway, Barangay Busay, Cebu City, Cebu, Philippines. It is a Roman-inspired structure dedicated to Leah Villa Albino-Adarna and her collection.

== History ==
Filipino businessman Teodorico Soriano Adarna decided to construct a structure resembling a Roman temple as a dedication to his wife, Leah Albino. The couple were the grandparents of actress Ellen Adarna. Albino was reportedly a hoarder who collected various items. When she was diagnosed with cancer, she was worried about the fate of her collection. She died on January 10, 2010.

Teodorico Adarna decided to honor his wife after her death by fulfilling a promise to keep her collection. He used 5,000 square meters (54,000 sq ft) of land on top of a hill originally meant for a family rest house to build a storage of Adarna matriarch's memoribilia.

The site was opened to the public in 2012 as the "Temple of Leah" despite not being finished yet. Admission was initially free but an entrance fee was eventually introduced. The Temple of Leah emerged as a local tourist destination by 2015 with the construction still going on site.

The Adarna patriarch himself died in November 2018, with his second and last wife Amabel Siason Adarna taking over the administration of the site in "principle". It then fell under the management of A.S. Adarna's firm A.S. Adarna's Tourist and Recreation Park. The dispute escalated in March 2020, when the Queensland International Realty and Development Corp. (QIRDC), acting in behalf of Leah Adarna's heirs, challenged the validity of the business permit of A.S. Adarna's firm which operated the site allegeldly without the consent of the heirs of Leah Adarna. The heirs took over the administration and the site was temporarily closed.

The Temple of Leah was later reopened to the public, with its reopening date not widely reported; it was operating as a tourist attraction again by 2023.

== Architecture and design ==
The 4,992-square-meter (53,730 sq ft) building of the Temple of Leah sits on top of a hill on a 5,140 m^{2} (55,300 sq ft) lot. It was built to resemble of Roman temple. It was deliberately adopted Roman architecture as "to withstand time and still be appreciated for a millennium". The main structure is made of cement, wood, and concrete reinforced with steel frames.

== Features and collection ==
Collection of vases, books, and other memoribilia inside the Temple of Leah.

The Temple of Leah has 24 chambers which houses Leah Adarna's collection, which includes antiques and Chinese jars. It also has various books.

Inside is also a 2.74-meter (9.0 ft) bronze statue of the matriarch with a dedication plaque signed by her husband.
