= JC de Vera =

Filipino actor (born 1986)

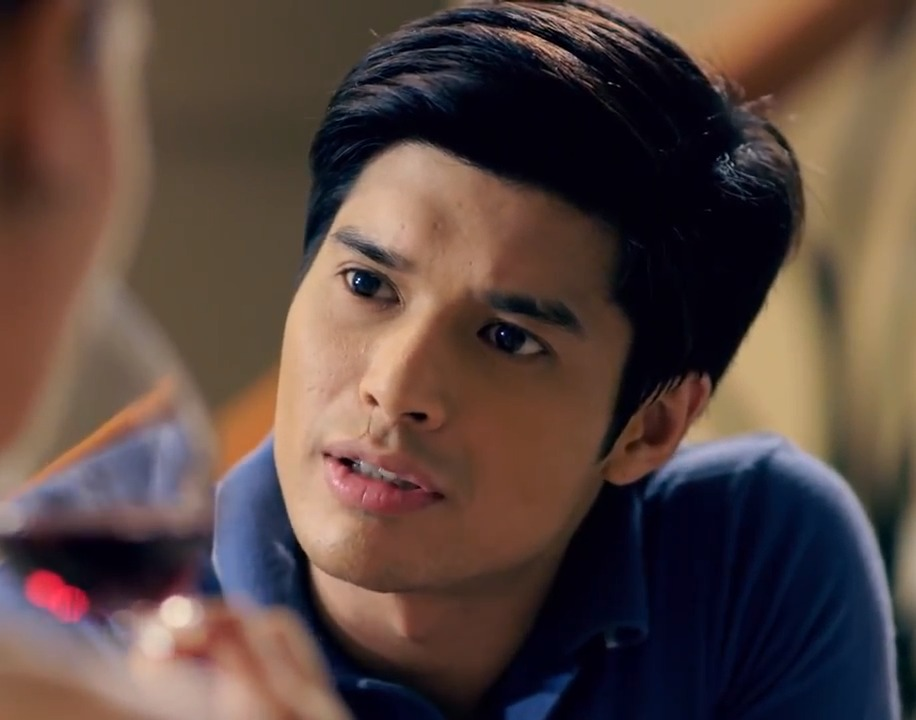
- de Vera in Shake, Rattle & Roll XV
- Born: John Carlo de Vera; March 10, 1986 (age 40); Manila, Philippines
- Occupations: Actor; host; model; singer
- Years active: 2003–present
- Agents: Sparkle (2003–2010); Talent5 (now Star Worx) (2010–2013); Star Magic (2013–present); Regal Entertainment (2006–present)
- Known for: Adrian Narciso in La Vida Lena; Philip Salazar in Nag-aapoy Na Damdamin
- Spouse: Rikkah Cruz (m. 2018)
- Children: 3
- Website: JC de Vera on Instagram

John Carlo de Vera (born March 10, 1986) is a Filipino actor. His accolades include a FAMAS Award, two PMPC Star Awards for Movies and two Box Office Entertainment Awards. He portrayed the antagonist role in La Vida Lena as Adrian Narciso and his protagonist role in Nag-aapoy na Damdamin as Philip Salazar.

In 2026, he is currently starring in the action-comedy primetime series Coco Martin's Sigabo portrayed role Sebastian Tuazon.

== Early life and education ==
De Vera was offered a basketball scholarship in Colegio de San Juan de Letran after he graduated from high school in Colegio San Agustin – Makati but rejected it to pursue his acting career. He also studied in Ateneo de Manila University.

== Acting career ==
=== 2003–2010 ===
He started his showbiz career in 2003 when he was cast in Click. At the time, he was paired up with Valerie Concepcion and Julianne Lee, but was soon cast in supporting and lead roles in primetime series with the likes of Richard Gutierrez, Dingdong Dantes and Dennis Trillo.

He was named as GMA Network's Drama Prince after they highly rated and praised Philippine dramas like Pati Ba Pintig ng Puso, Pasan Ko Ang Daigdig and Babangon Ako't Dudurugin Kita, where he was paired with Yasmien Kurdi. JC has also paired up with Rhian Ramos in LaLola and Heart Evangelista in Sine Novela's Ngayon at Kailanman. JC was paired up with Jackie Rice in the recently concluded fantaserye of GMA Network, Panday Kids.

=== 2010–2013 ===
De Vera was transferred to TV5 and signed a three-year contract. He was formally introduced on March 17, 2010, as one of the new talents to the network. His last appearance was Cassandra: Warrior Angel.

In December 2010, de Vera announced his departure from Bench following his decision not to renew his contract due to busy commitments, but he moved to Calvin Klein and Freego Jeans in August 2011.

=== 2013–present ===
After signing a two-year contract with ABS-CBN on July 29, 2013, De Vera's career returned to the limelight as he starred on the high-profile primetime series The Legal Wife starring Angel Locsin, Jericho Rosales and Maja Salvador, the afternoon series Moon of Desire starring Meg Imperial and Ellen Adarna, and in the film Once a Princess with Erich Gonzales and Enchong Dee. Soon after, he appeared in the 40th Metro Manila Film Festival movie Shake, Rattle & Roll XV, alongside Erich Gonzales.

In 2015, he starred in the romantic horror film Halik sa Hangin with Julia Montes and Gerald Anderson. He was seen next together with Jessy Mendiola in the romantic family drama series You're My Home, alongside Richard Gomez and Dawn Zulueta. He starred in the teleserye, The Better Half, as Rafael Cabrera, in 2017.

In 2018, he starred in the romantic comedy series Since I Found You with Arci Muñoz and Piolo Pascual.

== Other ventures ==
=== Business ===
In July 2007, de Vera was part of a group of celebrity investors—alongside Dennis Trillo, Katrina Halili, Diana Zubiri, Jaya, and Alfred Vargas—who each invested roughly ₱900,000 to open this bar and restaurant at the corner of Tomas Morato and Timog Avenue in Quezon City. The establishment closed down in 2011 due to sustained financial losses.

Founded by his high school friends from Colegio San Agustin in 2012, de Vera joined as a co-owner and business partner in 2014. Dubbed "The Bad Boys of Burger," the American Western-style burger joint featured gangster-themed menu items (such as The Executioner, King Pin, and Asiong Salonga). Beyond using his showbiz platform to promote the brand, he actively trained in kitchen operations and helped expand it from its original BF Homes, Parañaque location to branches in Circuit Makati and Upper McKinley Road, Taguig.

Before entering show business, de Vera engaged in small-scale side hustles to earn extra income—specifically buying and reselling sneakers and breeding mice to sell to pet shops.

== Personal life ==
In 2021, De Vera revealed that he and his non-showbiz partner Rikkah Cruz have been married since 2018. They have three children.

== Acting credits ==
=== Film ===
Key
| † | Denotes films that have not yet been released |

JC de Vera's film credits with year of release, film titles and roles
| Year | Title | Role | Ref. |
|---|---|---|---|
| 2005 | Mano Po 4: Ako Legal Wife | Nixon Chong | |
| 2006 | White Lady | Robbie | |
| 2007 | Ouija | Gino | |
| 2007 | Tiyanaks | Kerwin | |
| 2008 | My Bestfriend's Girlfriend | Mark Abo | |
| 2008 | My Monster Mom | Boboy | |
| 2008 | Loving You | Jepoi Gumba | |
| 2008 | Shake, Rattle & Roll X | Jay | |
| 2009 | Mano Po 6: A Mother's Love | Young Alfonso Uy | |
| 2010 | Hating Kapatid | Bong | |
| 2013 | Girl, Boy, Bakla, Tomboy | Osweng | |
| 2014 | So It's You | Tony Ferrer | |
| 2014 | Once a Princess | Damian Albert | |
| 2014 | Shake, Rattle & Roll XV | Troy | |
| 2015 | Halik sa Hangin | Alvin Paredes | |
| 2016 | Best Partee Ever | Mikey | |
| 2016 | Tisay | Simon | |
| 2016 | Kabisera | | |
| 2017 | Salvage | Neil | |
| 2018 | Ang Dalawang Mrs. Reyes | Felix Reyes | |
| 2018 | Everybody Loves Baby Wendy | Gabriel Roque | |
| 2018 | One Great Love | Carl Mauricio | |
| 2019 | Barbara Reimagined | James | |
| 2019 | Love Is Love | Anton | |
| 2021 | General Admission | Carlito | |
| 2022 | The Entiled | Atty. Jacob | |
| 2022 | Bakit 'Di Mo Sabihin? | Miguel | |
| 2024 | Apo Hapon: A Love Story | Reyson Olsim | |
| 2024 | Huwag Mo 'Kong Iwan | Joseph | |
| 2025 | In Thy Name | Khadaffy Janjalani | |
| 2026 | Poon | Richard | |
| 2026 | Florante and Laura † | Florante | |

=== Television ===
Key
| † | Denotes shows that have not yet been aired |

JC de Vera's television credits with year of release, title(s) and role
| Year | Title | Role | Ref. |
|---|---|---|---|
| 2003 | Click | Benj | |
| 2004 | Joyride | Carlo | |
| 2004 | Love to Love: Pretty Boy | —N/a | |
| 2004 | Forever in My Heart | Young Michael Bernabe | |
| 2005 | Now and Forever: Now and Forever: Mukha; Now and Forever: Agos | William; Julius | |
| 2005 | Sugo | James | |
| 2006 | Mars Ravelo: Captain Barbell | Boris / Super Boris | |
| 2006 | Makita Ka Lang Muli | Matthew | |
| 2007 | Magic Kamison: My Ghost Bride | Adrian | |
| 2007 | Mga Kuwento ni Lola Basyang: Ang Gwapong Sastre; Ang Mahiwagang Balabal | Adelino; Ali | |
| 2007 | Sine Novela: Pati Ba Pintig ng Puso; Pasan Ko ang Daigdig | Aldrin Griego; Carding | |
| 2008 | Babangon Ako't Dudurugin Kita | Derek Perantes / Rod | |
| 2008 | Dear Friend | Alex | |
| 2008 | Maynila | Various roles | |
| 2008 | Obra: Story 5: Pretty Boy; Story 6: Rehas; Story 7: Daddy Dearest; Story 8: Sintoy | Joel; Rico; Ryan; Sintoy | |
| 2008 | LaLola | Facundo Diaz | |
| 2009 | Ngayon at Kailanman | Edwin Torres | |
| 2009 | Dear Friend: Special | Tyron | |
| 2009–2010 | Sana Ngayong Pasko | Rigo Dionisio | |
| 2010 | Panday Kids | Aureus | |
| 2010 | Lokomoko U | —N/a | |
| 2010 | 5 Star Specials: JC: Tato-45; Kardong Kamao; Johnny Salamangkero; Gabriel Molave; Jak en Poy; Papa Rusty; Si Paco at ang Prinsesa; Si Ali, si Oli at si Tommy | Various roles | |
| 2010–2011 | My Driver Sweet Lover | Rocky | |
| 2011 | Star Confessions: Isko Moreno | Isko Moreno | |
| 2011 | Ang Utol Kong Hoodlum | Benjamin Maningding | |
| 2012 | Enchanted Garden | Edmund | |
| 2012 | Valiente | Gardo Valiente / Nicolas Vallejo / Gardo Braganza | |
| 2013 | Toda Max | Jake | |
| 2013 | ASAP XP | Co-host / Performer | |
| 2014 | The Legal Wife | Max Gonzales | |
| 2014 | Moon of Desire | Dr. Jefferson "Jeff" Bustamante | |
| 2015 | Maalaala Mo Kaya: E-Mail | Andrew | |
| 2015 | Banana Sundae | Various Roles | |
| 2015 | Ipaglaban Mo: Pusong Mapanlinlang | Manolo | |
| 2015–2016 | You're My Home | Christian Vergara | |
| 2016 | Wansapanataym: Just Got Laki | Michael/Big Macky | |
| 2016 | Maalaala Mo Kaya: Pictures - Courageous Catie | Jayjay | |
| 2016 | Maalaala Mo Kaya: Golden Boy | Josef | |
| 2017 | The Better Half | Rafael Cabrera | |
| 2017 | Maalaala Mo Kaya: Baso | Jayson | |
| 2018 | Since I Found You | Gino Corpuz | |
| 2018 | Ipaglaban Mo: Abogada | Max Sandejas | |
| 2019 | The General's Daughter | Ethan Del Fierro | |
| 2019–2020 | Pamilya Ko | Nathan Rubiñol | |
| 2020–2022 | La Vida Lena | Adrian Narciso | |
| 2021 | Maalaala Mo Kaya: Paru-paro | Jay | |
| 2022 | The Goodbye Girl | Ean | |
| 2022 | Flower of Evil | Andrew Marcelo | |
| 2023–2024 | Nag-aapoy na Damdamin | Phillip Salazar | |
| 2025 | Rainbow Rumble | Contestant | |
| 2025 | Sins of the Father | Jacob Rivera | |
| 2026 | Sigabo | Sebastian "Seb" Tuazon | |
| 2026 | Someone, Someday | Alvin Ramirez | |

== Accolades ==
Awards and Nominations
| Year | Award giving body | Category | Nominated work | Result | Ref. |
|---|---|---|---|---|---|
| 2014 | ASAP Pop Viewers Choice Awards | Pop Pin Up Boy | JC de Vera | Nominated | |
| 2017 | Blue Star Awards | Best Foreign Actor | Moon of Desire | Nominated | |
| 2019 | Box Office Entertainment Awards | Movie Supporting Actor of the Year | One Great Love | Won | |
| 2020 | Box Office Entertainment Awards | Best Acting Ensemble in a Drama series | The General's Daughter | Won | |
| 2016 | Cinema One Originals Digital Film Festival | Best Actor | Tisay | Nominated | |
| 2007 | FAMAS Awards | German Moreno Youth Achievement | JC de Vera | Won | |
| 2018 | Metro Manila Film Festival | Best Supporting Actor | One Great Love | Nominated | |
| 2016 | QCinema International Film Festival | Best Actor | Best. Partee. Ever. | Won | |
| 2006 | Star Awards for Movies | New Movie Actor of the Year | Ako Legal Wife: Mano Po 4? | Nominated | |
| 2017 | Star Awards for Movies | Movie Actor of the Year | Best. Partee. Ever. | Nominated | |
| 2024 | Star Awards for Movies | Movie Loveteam of the Year | Bakit 'Di Mo Sabihin? | Won | |
| 2024 | Star Awards for Movies | Male Star of the Night | JC de Vera | Won | |
| 2004 | Star Awards for Television | Most Promising Young Actor | Joyride | Nominated | |
| 2005 | Star Awards for Television | Male Star of the Night | JC de Vera | Won | |
| 2010 | Star Awards for Television | Male Celebrity of the Night | JC de Vera | Won | |
| 2017 | Star Awards for Television | Best Single Performance by an Actor | Maalaala Mo Kaya: "Baso" | Nominated | |
| 2023 | The EDDYS | Best Actor | Bakit 'Di Mo Sabihin? | Nominated | |
| 2014 | Yahoo! Philippines OMG! Awards | Male Emerging Star | JC de Vera | Won | |
| 2016 | Young Critics Circle | Best Performance | Salvage | Nominated | |
