= Mga Kuwento ni Lola Basyang (TV program) =

2007 Philippine television drama series

- Title card
- Genre: Fantasy drama
- Written by: Gina Marissa Tagasa; Agnes de Guzman; Dinno Erece; Adrian Ho
- Directed by: Argel Joseph; Don Michael Perez
- Starring: Manilyn Reynes; Paul Salas
- Country of origin: Philippines
- Original language: Tagalog
- No. of seasons: 2
- No. of episodes: 26 (list of episodes)

Production
- Executive producer: Joseph Buncalan
- Camera setup: Multiple-camera setup
- Running time: 23–37 minutes
- Production company: GMA Entertainment TV

Original release
- Network: GMA Network
- Release: February 4 – August 12, 2007

Mga Kuwento ni Lola Basyang (transl. stories of grandma Basyang) is a 2007 Philippine television drama fantasy anthology series broadcast by GMA Network. Starring Manilyn Reynes in the title role and Paul Salas, it premiered on February 4, 2007. The series concluded on August 12, 2007, with a total of 26 episodes.

The series is streaming online on YouTube.

== Overview ==
The show is a program designed specifically to appeal to children. It is a weekly anthology aimed at entertaining children through a retelling of Severino Reyes' classic folktales and seeks to rekindle their interest in the richness of Filipino literature. All the episodes featured live-action twist adaptations of Pinoy folktales in costume by many well-known actors, teleplays by Gina Marissa Tagasa, Agnes de Guzman, Dinno Erece and Adrian Ho, and are directed by Argel Joseph and Don Michael Perez.

Mga Kuwento ni Lola Basyang is a series of short stories written by "Lola Basyang", pen name of Severino Reyes, founder and editor of the Tagalog magazine Liwayway. The original magazine stories have been adapted several times for comics, television, film, and published in book form. GMA Network bought the rights for the TV serialization of Mga Kuwento ni Lola Basyang.

== Episodes ==
=== Season 1 ===
- Ang Mahiwagang kuba (The Enchanted Hunchback)
- Ang Prinsipeng Unggoy (The Monkey Prince)
- Ang Parusa ng Duwende (The Dwarf's Punishment)
- Ang Binibining Tumalo sa Mahal Datu (The Maiden Who Defeated the Datu)
- Ang Mahiwagang Biyulin (The Enchanted Violin)
- Ang Prinsipeng Mahaba ang Ilong (The Prince with A Long Nose)
- Ang Sumpa ng Higanteng si Amok (The Curse of Amok the Giant)
- Ang Walong Bulag (The Eight Blind Men)
- Ang Prinsipeng Duwag (The Cowardly Prince)
- Akong Ikit
- Maria Alimango
- Si Sultan Saif (Sultan Saif)
- Ang Prinsipe ng mga Ibon (prince of the birds)

=== Season 2 ===
- Si Pedrong Walang Takot (Fearless Pedro)
- Ang Gwapong Sastre (The Handsome Tailor)
- Ang Palasyo ng mga Duwende (The Palace of the Dwarves)
- Ang Kapatid ng Tatlong Maria (The Brother of the Three Marias)
- Ang Hukbo ni Padre Pedro (The Legion of Father Pedro)
- Ang Plautin ni Periking (The Flute of Periking)
- Anting-anting (The Amulet)
- Ang Mahiwagang Balabal (The Enchanted Cape)
- Ang Dragon sa Ilog Lingwa (The Dragon in Lingwa River)
- Pandakotyong
- Ang Kastilyong Bakal (The Iron-made Palace)
- Prinsesang Kalbo (The Bald Princess)
- Ang Pitong Hilo (The Seven Idiots)

== Accolades ==
Accolades received by Mga Kuwento ni Lola Basyang
Year	Award	Category	Recipient	Result	Ref.
2007	Catholic Mass Media Awards	Best Children's Program	Mga Kuwento ni Lola Basyang	Won	
2007	21st PMPC Star Awards for Television	Best Horror-Fantasy Program	Mga Kuwento ni Lola Basyang	Nominated	
