= Aryana (TV series) =

- Title card
- Genre: Drama; Fantasy
- Created by: ABS-CBN Studios
- Written by: Noreen Capili; Joel Mercado
- Directed by: Erick C. Salud; Lino S. Cayetano; Darnel Joy R. Villaflor
- Starring: Ella Cruz; Francis Magundayao; Paul Salas; Dominic Roque; Michelle Vito
- Opening theme: "Nasaan Ka Man" by Amy Nobleza
- Composer: Jessie Lasaten
- Country of origin: Philippines
- Original language: Filipino
- No. of seasons: 3
- No. of episodes: 189

Production
- Executive producers: Carlo Katigbak; Cory Vidanes; Laurenti Dyogi; Roldeo Endrinal
- Producer: Rosselle "Beegee" Soldao-Gannaban
- Production location: Philippines
- Cinematography: Joey Mallari; Genie Oyong
- Editors: Godwin Lucena; Aubrey Ner
- Running time: 28–35 minutes Monday to Friday at 17:45 (PST)
- Production company: Dreamscape Entertainment Television

Original release
- Network: ABS-CBN
- Release: May 7, 2012 – January 25, 2013

Aryana is a Philippine television drama fantasy series broadcast by ABS-CBN. Directed by Erick C. Salud, Lino S. Cayetano and Darnel Joy R. Villaflor. it stars Ella Cruz, Francis Magundayao, Paul Salas, Dominic Roque and Michelle Vito. It aired on the network's Primetime Bida line up and worldwide on TFC from May 7, 2012 to January 25, 2013, replacing Precious Hearts Romances Presents: Lumayo Ka Man sa Akin and was replaced by Kahit Konting Pagtingin.

== Overview ==
=== Synopsis ===
Aryana narrates the journey of a girl as she struggles in the awkward but exciting adolescent stage while trying to escape her inevitable destiny as a mermaid on her fourteenth birthday.

Two mothers from entirely different worlds play major roles in the story. Ofelia is a human, who struggles for the acceptance of her noble mother-in-law, and hopes that with the birth of her daughter she will gain the happiness of her husband's family. Neptuna, a beautiful adult mermaid with a bright orange-and-gold scaly fish tail whose pure and strong motherly love for her daughter, Perlita, knows no bounds and will do anything to make sure she is safe and happy. Perlita was fascinated with humans and dreams of living happily with them, often going near the seashore to watch the humans. She even once stole the mystical pearl that can transform a mermaid into a human and back at will. Unfortunately, when she went near the seashore to watch humans who were playing with firecrackers, a drunken villager carried a dynamite. Victor, Ofelia's husband, confronts the villager and unknowingly throws the dynamite away into the part of the sea where Perlita was hiding. Neptuna went to warn her daughter, but was not able to make it in time. Thus, she saw the death of her dearly beloved daughter and angrily promises to do everything she can to make Victor and Ofelia feel the intense pain and sorrow of losing their own beloved daughter. Ofelia and Victor's child, whom they named Aryana, was then born. As Ofelia was hoping for, she gained the acceptance of her mother-in-law.

During Aryana's baptismal celebration, Neptuna (as a human woman) kidnaps newborn Aryana, raising her as her own daughter for a while until she discovered that she cannot make Aryana a complete mermaid unless her mother gives her up willingly. The presumed loss of their daughter caused Victor and Ofelia's family to break up. Victor remarries to a vain woman named Stella and her own daughter Megan. Neptuna reluctantly gave Aryana back to Ofelia with the agreement that on Aryana's fourteenth birthday she must forsake her. Ofelia desperately accepts--and with no intention of ever giving her daughter back--she runs away from their seaside village and goes to the urban city, opening a small aquarium shop, to forget about the mermaid curse on her daughter, just as Neptuna thought she would. Every day, Ofelia gets a reminder that her daughter is and will forever belong to the sea when she turns fourteen. Aryana lives out her dream on being a professional swimmer or dancer; unaware of her inherent abilities over water. As she faces her fate of becoming a mermaid, Aryana is torn between choosing the sea and the surface world of humans where her heart belongs.

== Cast and characters ==
=== Main cast ===
- Ella Cruz as Aryana Capuyao-Mendez
  - Dexie Daulat as young Aryana
- Francis Magundayao as Adrian "Ian" Alejandro
  - Elijah Magundayao as young Ian
- Paul Salas as Marlon Salvador
  - Kristoff Meneses as young Marlon
- Dominic Roque as Hubert Francisco
- Michelle Vito as Megan Cervantes
  - Alyanna Angeles young Megan

=== Supporting cast ===
- Pokwang as Ofelia Capuyao-Mendez
- Tonton Gutierrez as Victor Mendez
- Desiree del Valle as Neptuna
- G. Toengi as Stella Cervantes
- Laurice Guillen as Elnora Mendez
- Bianca Manalo as Carlina Suarez
- Tetchie Agbayani as Reyna Yasmin
- Neil Coleta as Andoy Capuyao
  - Maliksi Morales as young Andoy
  - Carlo Lacana as teenage Andoy
- Lotlot de Leon as Rosita Salvador
- Louise Abuel as Miko Salvador
- David Chua as Melvin Abad
  - Quintin Alianza as young Melvin
  - Yong An Chiu as teenage Melvin
- Eunice Lagusad as Elizabeth "Bebet" Teves
- Mel Kimura as Sylvia "Ibiang" Francisco
- Andre Tiangco as Anton
- Celine Lim as Trisha Reyes
- Noemi Oineza as Chelsea Montes
- Vanjo Cuenca as Aries Ocampo
- Lander Vera Perez as Rick Alejandro
- Richard Quan as Jason Cervantes
- Michael Conan as Allan
- Boom Labrusca as Tilapio
- Chokoleit as Dikya
- Marvin Yap as Pla Pla
- Badjie Mortiz as Bisugo
- Jane Oineza as Perlita

== Reruns ==
The show began airing re-runs on Jeepney TV from December 31, 2018 to March 22, 2019; November 29, 2021 to March 4, 2022; October 23, 2023 to March 1, 2024; July 7 to November 14, 2025; and August 24, 2026 to January 8, 2027.

== See also ==
- List of programs broadcast by ABS-CBN
- List of ABS-CBN Studios original drama series
- List of programs broadcast by Jeepney TV
