= Lunch Break (TV program) =

- Also known as: Lunchbreak Muna (2002–2003)
- Genre: Variety show
- Created by: Mateo Management Group
- Developed by: Intercontinental Broadcasting Corporation
- Directed by: JR Ledesma
- Presented by: Maribeth Bichara (2002–2003); Dang Cruz (2000–2003); Earl Ignacio (2000–2002); Leonard Obal (2000–2003); Joy Viado (2000–2002)
- Opening theme: "Lunchbreak Theme" by the cast
- Country of origin: Philippines
- Original language: Filipino
- No. of episodes: N/A

Production
- Executive producer: Ervin Mateo
- Production locations: Live Studio 2, IBC Studio, Broadcast City, Quezon City, Philippines
- Running time: 90 minutes (Weekdays) 150 minutes (Saturdays)

Original release
- Network: Intercontinental Broadcasting Corporation
- Release: November 4, 2000 – December 12, 2003

Related
- Alas Dose sa Trese; It's Chowtime!

Lunch Break is a Philippine television variety show broadcast by IBC. Originally hosted by Jojo Abellana, Dang Cruz, Earl Ignacio, Michael Laygo, Yam Ledesma, Ronald Gan Ledesma, Leonard Obal, Geraldine Roxas, Ben Sagmit, Joy Viado, Hannah Villame and Yoyoy Villame, it aired from November 4, 2000 to December 12, 2003, replacing Alas Dose sa Trese and was replaced by It's Chowtime!. Lorraine Baretto, Maribeth Bichara, Cruz, Lara Fabregas, Melisa Henderson, Jerome John Hughes, Ledesma, Everly Locsin, Patrick Ervin Mateo Jr., Niño Muhlach, Glydel Mercado, Cody Moreno, Natassia Nave and Leonard Obal serve as the final hosts.

== History ==
=== Early years (2000–2001) ===
After its predecessor Alas Dose sa Trese ended its run on November 3, 2000, the Intercontinental Broadcasting Corporation and Mateo Management Group co-produced a brand new variety show to compete with ABS-CBN's Magandang Tanghali Bayan (which was later reformatted as Masayang Tanghali Bayan during the show's final year) and GMA Network's Eat Bulaga!. Lunch Break debuted on November 4, 2000, at 11:00 am to 12:30 pm, with Dang Cruz, Earl Ignacio, Leonard Obal and Joy Viado as its original main hosts. Jojo Abellana, Michael Laygo, Ronald Gan Ledesma, Yam Ledesma, Geraldine Roxas, Ben Sagmit and Yoyoy Villame (with his daughter, Hannah) also serves as its additional hosts. The new show was preceded by the game show also produced by MMG Entertainment Group, Alas Suerte hosted by Nanette Inventor which is aired at 11:30 a.m.

=== First revamp (2001–2002) ===
In 2001, big changes were added to the cast of Lunch Break. Aga Muhlach's cousin Niño Muhlach, Natassia Nave and Japanese-based actor Jacky Woo were added as its hosts along with Patrick Ervin Mateo Jr., son of the show's Executive Producer Ervin Mateo was also added as its main host. In addition, the show's theme song was remixed and a new opening billboard was also introduced on occasion of the show's first anniversary on November 5, 2001.

=== Lunchbreak Muna, final years (2002–2003) ===
Despite the investment scam regarding the show's producer in 2002, Lunch Break was reformatted as Lunchbreak Muna (Lit: "Lunchbreak First") in November, Abellana, Ignacyo, Laygo, Ledesma, Roxas, Sagmit, Viado and the Villames left the show and were replaced by new hosts Lorraine Baretto, Maribeth Bichara, Lara Fabregas, Jerome John Hughes, Melisa Henderson, Everly Locsin, Glydel Mercado and Cody Moreno; and with Bichara were promoted as main hosts. Cruz, Muhlach, Nave, Obal and Woo remained as hosts during the show's final run. The show made their final broadcast on December 12, 2003. After five months of hiatus, the show was eventually replaced by It's Chowtime! produced by PROADS Marketing Inc. on May 17, 2004.

== Hosts ==
- Jojo Abellana (2000–2002)
- Lorraine Baretto (2002–2003)
- Maribeth Bichara (2002–2003)
- Dang Cruz (2000–2003)
- Lara Fabregas (2002–2003)
- Andrei Felix (2001–2003)
- Melisa Henderson (2002–2003)
- Jerome John Hughes (2002–2003)
- Earl Ignacio (2000–2002)
- Michael Laygo (2000–2002)
- Yam Ledesma (2000–2003)
- Ronald Gan Ledesma (2000–2002)
- Everly Locsin (2002–2003)
- Patrick Ervin Mateo Jr. (2001–2003)
- Niño Muhlach (2001–2003)
- Glydel Mercado (2002–2003)
- Cody Moreno (2002–2003)
- Natassia Nave (2001–2003)
- Leonard Obal (2000–2003)
- Geraldine Roxas (2000–2002)
- Ben Sagmit (2000–2002)
- Joy Viado (2000–2002)
- Hannah Villame (2000–2002)
- Yoyoy Villame (2000–2002)
- Jacky Woo (2001–2003)

== Segments ==
- Cyberlook (2000–2003)
- Pasikatan (2000–2003)
- Pinoy Heartthrob (2000–2003)
- Pretty Lady (Monday, Wednesday and Friday) (2000–2003)
- Super Girlash (2000–2003)
- Christmas Wish Tree (December 2000)
- Beach Buddies (2001–2003)
- Charing Squad (2001–2003)
- Dance Dynamica (2001–2003)
- Exotic Divas (2001–2003)
- Glamour Mom (2001–2003)
- Honda TODA King (2001–2002)
- Little Darling (2001–2002)
- Little Dream Boy 2001 (2001)
- Loud & Proud (2001–2003)
- Star Material (2002)
