= May Isang Pangarap =

Television series

- Title card
- Also known as: There's a Dream
- Genre: Drama; Musical; Family; Comedy
- Written by: Joel Mercado
- Directed by: Jerry Lopez Sineneng; Erick C. Salud; Manny Q. Palo; Claudio "Tots" Sanchez-Mariscal IV
- Starring: Larah Claire Sabroso; Julia Klarrise Base; Vina Morales; Carmina Villarroel
- Opening theme: "Patuloy ang Pangarap" by Vina Morales, Larah Claire Sabroso and Julia Klarisse Base
- Composer: Jonathan Manalo
- Country of origin: Philippines
- Original languages: Filipino; English
- No. of episodes: 82

Production
- Executive producers: Carlo Katigbak; Cory Vidanes; Laurenti Dyogi; Roldeo T. Endrinal
- Producer: Jennifer B. Soliman
- Running time: 22–30 minutes Monday to Friday at 14:45 (PST)
- Production company: Dreamscape Entertainment Television

Original release
- Network: ABS-CBN
- Release: January 21 – May 17, 2013

May Isang Pangarap (International title: There's a Dream / transl. There is a Dream) is a 2013 Philippine television drama series broadcast by ABS-CBN. Directed by Jerry Lopez Sineneng, Erick C. Salud, Manny Q. Palo and Claudio "Tots" Sanchez-Mariscal IV, it stars Vina Morales, Carmina Villarroel, Larah Claire Sabroso and Julia Klarisse Base. It aired on the network's Kapamilya Gold line up and worldwide on TFC from January 21 to May 17, 2013, replacing Angelito: Ang Bagong Yugto and was replaced by My Little Juan.

== Cast and characters ==
=== Main cast ===
- Larah Claire Sabroso as Lara Francisco Santos / Lara Mariella Ella Rodriguez Santos: She is Kare and Otep's daughter. At a young age, she always wanted to pursue a singing career. During the season finale, she got into an accident trying to save Julia from her biological father, Dante. She later survived. In the end, she accepts Kare as her mother.
- Julia Klarisse Base as Julia Rodriguez Santos: She is Kare's adoptive daughter who she founds on the street.
- Vina Morales as Karina "Kare" Rodriguez-Santos: She was Otep's fiancée and Lara's biological mother. She and Otep broke up because Kare was busy with her singing career abroad.
- Carmina Villarroel as Nesa Francisco: Otep's neighbor. She stood as a mother figure to Lara.

=== Supporting cast ===
- Rico Blanco as Joseph "Otep" Santos: Kare's fiancée, but they broke up due to long distance relationship and because Kare was busy with her singing career abroad. He went to Spain for work, but he died in a car accident.
- Gloria Diaz as Olivia Rodriguez: Kare's aunt.
- Bembol Roco as Turing
- Dennis Padilla as Restituto "Resty" Francisco
- Shamaine Centenera-Buencamino as Azon Francisco
- Ron Morales as Enrico "Eric" Castro
- Valerie Concepcion as Lorraine Castro
- Dominic Roque as Alvin Francisco
- Erin Ocampo as Danica "Nica" Rodriguez
- Ogie Diaz as Percy
- Malou Crisologo as Meldy
- Gio Alvarez as James
- Gerald Pesigan as Ipe

=== Guest cast ===
- Dominic Ochoa as Benjie
- Eda Nolan as Belen
- Joem Bascon as Dante: Julia's abusive biological father. He died in the end after being shot a group of police officers due to refusal to surrender.

=== Special participation ===
- Boy Abunda as himself

== See also ==
- List of programs broadcast by ABS-CBN
- List of ABS-CBN Studios original drama series
