= Alas Dose sa Trese =

- Genre: Variety show
- Created by: IBC 13
- Directed by: Manning Rivera
- Presented by: Eddie Ilarde; Boots Anson-Roa
- Country of origin: Philippines
- No. of episodes: n/a

Production
- Production locations: Live Studio 2, IBC Studio, Broadcast City, Quezon City, Philippines
- Production company: Seven Eyes Productions

Original release
- Network: IBC
- Release: July 24, 1999 – November 3, 2000

Alas Dose sa Trese (transl. Twelve o' Clock on [Channel] Thirteen) is a Philippine television variety show broadcast by IBC. Hosted by Eddie Ilarde and Boots Anson-Roa, it aired from July 24, 1999 to November 3, 2000, replacing Chopsuey Espesyal and was replaced by Lunch Break.

== History ==
On July 24, 1999, former Student Canteen main host Eddie Ilarde resurfaced in the noontime scene as host of IBC noontime show Alas Dose sa Trese. He was joined by the mother-daughter tandem of Boots Anson-Roa (a former host of the original Student Canteen), Chiqui Roa-Puno (newscaster of PTV and one of the top female sportscasters at that time), Ernani "Jong" Cuenco, Pia Pilapil, Jojo Alejar, and actor-musician Paco Arespacochaga in the show.

Some elements of Student Canteen were seen in the show, along with former contestants from "Student Canteen"'s singing portions who gamely sang and entertained audiences via the segment "Student Canteen Corner".

The show ended on November 3, 2000, due to low ratings and was replaced by Lunch Break, produced by the controversial Mateo Management Group.
