= Moon of Desire =

2014 Philippine television drama romance fantasy series

- Title card
- Genre: Drama; Fantasy; Sci-fi; Romance
- Created by: ABS-CBN Studios; Willy Laconsay
- Developed by: ABS-CBN Studios
- Written by: Jose Ruel L. Garcia; Ruel Montañez Agrano; Chie E. Floresca; Jurey Mirafuentes; Glenford Leonillo; Abigail Gomez Junia
- Directed by: FM Reyes; Raymund B. Ocampo; Ricky S. Rivero
- Starring: Meg Imperial; JC de Vera; Ellen Adarna; Dominic Roque; Miko Raval
- Opening theme: "Moon of Desire" by Morissette
- Composer: Trina Belamide
- Country of origin: Philippines
- Original language: Tagalog
- No. of episodes: 98

Production
- Executive producers: Carlo Katigbak; Cory Vidanes; Laurenti Dyogi; Ruel Bayani
- Producers: Jayson Aracap Tabigue; Katrina Juban; Mavic Holgado-Oducayen
- Editor: Jay Mendoza
- Running time: 30–35 minutes
- Production company: RSB Unit

Original release
- Network: ABS-CBN
- Release: March 31 – August 15, 2014

Moon of Desire is a 2014 Philippine television drama romance fantasy series broadcast by ABS-CBN. Directed by FM Reyes, Raymund B. Ocampo and Ricky S. Rivero, starring JC de Vera and Meg Imperial, Ellen Adarna, Dominic Roque and Miko Raval. It aired on the network's Kapamilya Gold line up and worldwide on TFC from March 31 to August 15, 2014, replacing Galema: Anak ni Zuma and was replaced by Ana Manuela. This is the last ABS-CBN drama series to be produced in standard definition or 4:3 aspect ratio, as the network's drama series that were released following this series are now all produced in high-definition or 16:9 aspect ratio.

The series is streaming online on YouTube.

== Synopsis ==
The story centers on Ayla and her famous FM radio program Moon of Desire. Everyone is talking about it because of the lovely, seductive and sexy voice that soothes the pain of those who are heart broken by the love advice she gives. But more than the talk about the radio program, the true mystery that hounds her listeners is the anonymity of the DJ herself. There is a clamor for DJ Ayla to show herself to her fans but she never does. This is because, behind the beautiful and captivating voice lies a secret. DJ Ayla is covered in hair from head to toe. She has a medical condition called Hypertrichosis.

== Cast and characters ==
=== Protagonist ===
- Meg Imperial as Ayla "DJ Lav" Ricafrente-Bustamante / Angel Comia
- JC de Vera as Dr. Jefferson "Jeff Epoy" Bustamante

=== Lead cast ===
- Ellen Adarna as Dra. Tamara Herrera
- Dominic Roque as Vince Regalado
- Miko Raval as Erron Angeles

=== Main cast ===
- Carmi Martin as Soledad Ricafrente
- Precious Lara Quigaman as Mia Ricafrente
- Beauty Gonzalez as Matilda Angela "Tilda" Comia-Ledesma
- Devon Seron as Riri Bustamante
- Franco Daza as Nolan Ledesma
- Dawn Jimenez as Violet "DJ Violet" Mendoza
- Guji Lorenzana as Philip Acosta
- Perla Bautista as Amor Martinez

=== Supporting cast ===
- Bodjie Pascua as Abel Bustamante
- Chinggoy Alonzo as Robert Herrera
- Kevin Fowler as Runin Comia
- Benj Bolivar as Paco Mercader
- Djanin Cruz as Karen Custodio
- Peter Serrano as Pete Regalado
- Myrtle Sarrosa as Anise
- Karen Reyes as Chimmy
- Moi Bien as Maan
- AJ Dee as Caleb
- Alex Castro as Diego
- Dey-Dey Amansec as Popoy
- Mel Kimura as Luningning/Havana

=== Guest cast ===
- Arnold Reyes as Simon Bustamante
- Marina Benipayo as Dr. Ellen Chan
- Tanya Gomez as Esther
- Jason Abalos as Ulric
- Veyda Inoval as young Ayla
- Bugoy Cariño as young Jeff/ Epoy
- Sofia Millares as young Riri

== See also ==
- List of programs broadcast by ABS-CBN
- List of ABS-CBN Studios original drama series
