= Happy Land (TV program) =

Philippine television infotainment show

- Title card
- Genre: Infotainment
- Directed by: Joyce Bernal; Dante Nico Garcia
- Presented by: Love Añover; Patricia Gayod; Jermaine Ulgasan
- Country of origin: Philippines
- Original language: Tagalog
- No. of episodes: 44

Production
- Executive producer: Sharon Rose Masula
- Camera setup: Multiple-camera setup
- Running time: 30 minutes
- Production company: GMA News and Public Affairs

Original release
- Network: GMA Network
- Release: June 6, 2009 – March 27, 2010

Happy Land is a Philippine television infotainment children show broadcast by GMA Network. Hosted by Love Añover, Patricia Gayod and Jermaine Ulgasan, it premiered on June 6, 2009. The show concluded on March 27, 2010, with a total of 44 episodes.

== Overview ==
The shortage of public early childhood care and development institutions in the Philippines challenged GMA News and Public Affairs to produce a definitive pre-school education program with the objective of shaping a whole new generation's viewpoint.

The United Nations Educational, Scientific, and Cultural Organization or (UNESCO) Education for All by 2015 report states that pre-primary education in the Philippines is available only to 41% of the total population, as most pre-schools are privately owned and concentrated in highly urbanized areas.

Happy Land's goal is to inspire young viewers to discover happiness despite the bad things in life.

Combining animation, digital technology, and live-action photography, Happy Land aims to bring Filipino children to a new level of TV viewing. Aside from the narrative, the show will also teach basic pre-school subjects like Language and the Alphabet, Math, Science, and General Knowledge through independent segments.

== Hosts ==
- Love Añover as Belle
- Patricia Gayod as Anna
- Jermaine Ulgasan as Buboy
- Joy Viado as Auring

Recurring cast

- Maey Bautista
- Betong Sumaya

Puppets

- Mingming
- Bulatelino
- Popoy
- Cocoy

== Ratings ==
According to AGB Nielsen Philippines' Mega Manila household television ratings, the pilot episode of Happy Land earned a 13% rating. The final episode scored a 6.7% rating.

== Accolades ==
Accolades received by Happy Land
Year	Award	Category	Recipient	Result	Ref.
2009	Anak TV Seal Awards	Most Well-Liked TV Program	Happy Land	Included	
2010	24th PMPC Star Awards for Television	Best Children Show	Happy Land	Won	
2010	24th PMPC Star Awards for Television	Best Children Show Host	Love Añover Patricia Gayod	Won	
