= You're Still the One (film) =

- Theatrical film poster
- Directed by: Chris Martinez
- Written by: Aloy Adlawan
- Produced by: Charo Santos-Concio; Malou N. Santos; Lily Y. Monteverde; Roselle Y. Monteverde
- Starring: Maja Salvador; Dennis Trillo; Richard Yap; Ellen Adarna
- Cinematography: Gary Gardoce
- Edited by: Benjamin Tolentino
- Music by: Vincent de Jesus
- Production companies: ABS-CBN Film Productions, Inc.; Regal Films
- Distributed by: Regal Entertainment; Star Cinema
- Release date: May 27, 2015
- Running time: 116 minutes
- Country: Philippines
- Languages: Filipino; English
- Box office: ₱22,219,607.00

You're Still the One is a 2015 Filipino romantic drama film directed by Chris Martinez and starring Maja Salvador, Dennis Trillo, Richard Yap and Ellen Adarna. It was distributed by Star Cinema and Regal Entertainment and was released on May 27, 2015.

This is also the last film appearance of comedienne Joy Viado in her lifetime, who died in a heart attack in Diliman, Quezon City on September 10, 2016 at the age of 57.

== Plot ==
Two people who have always been in love struggle to find the right time to finally be together, as they keep encountering each other when they're with someone else.

== Cast ==
- Maja Salvador as Ellise
- Dennis Trillo as Jojo
- Richard Yap as Vincent
- Ellen Adarna as Racquel
- Zsa Zsa Padilla as Cecilia
- Snooky Serna as Melissa
- Lito Pimentel as Eric
- Joshua Garcia as Ericson
- Melai Cantiveros as Meanne
- Jason Francisco as Dong
- Jinri Park as Evelyn
- Manuel Chua as Ariel
- Frances Ignacio as Terry
- Ina Raymundo
- AJ Dee
- Joy Viado
