= Dominic Roque =

Filipino actor

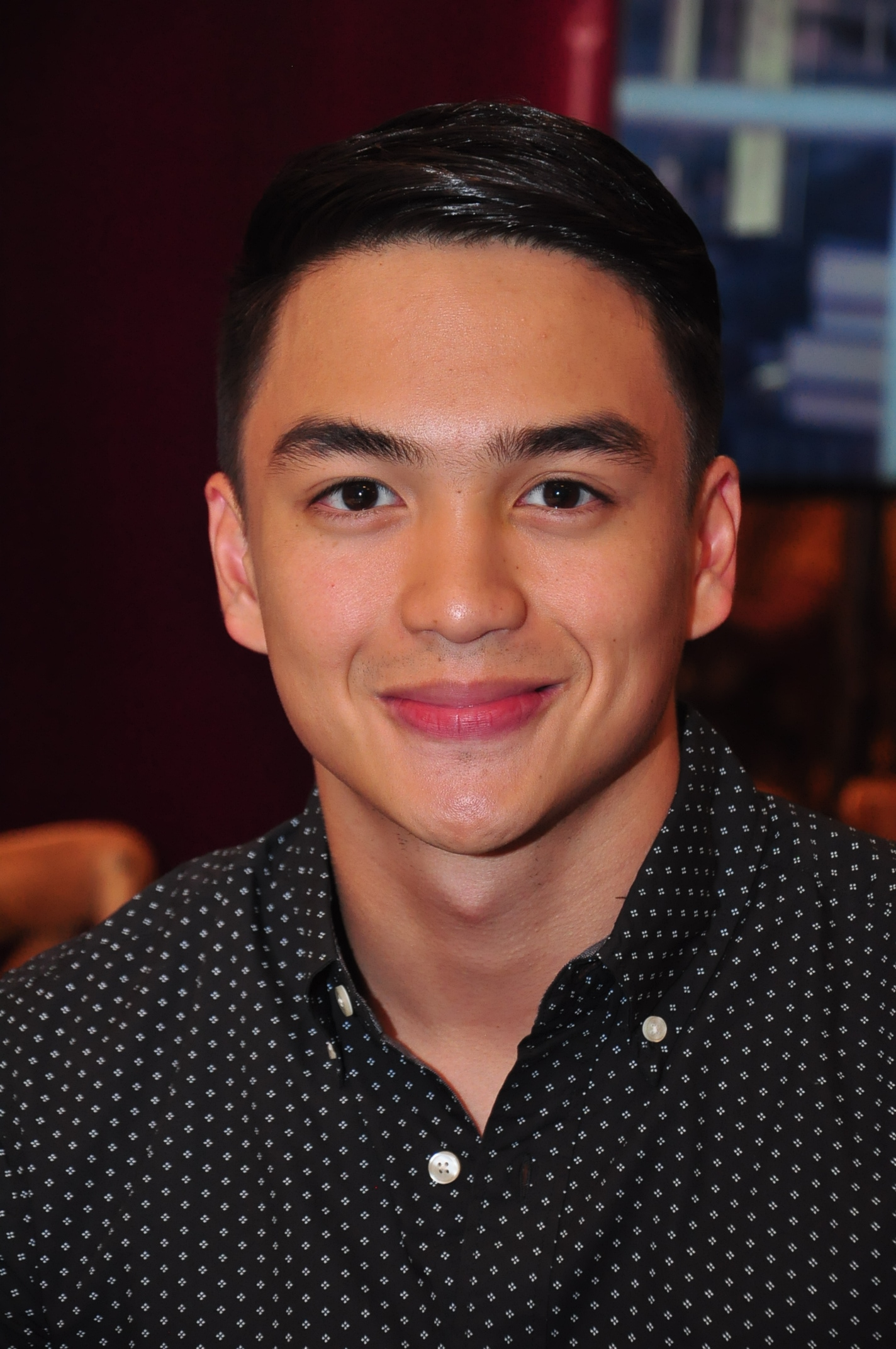
- Roque on December 23, 2016
- Born: Dominic Karl Manalo Roque; July 20, 1990 (age 36); Cavite City, Philippines
- Education: De La Salle–College of Saint Benilde, (Tourism)
- Occupations: Actor, model TV Host
- Years active: 2010–present
- Agents: Star Magic (2010–2021); Cornerstone Entertainment (2021–present)
- Known for: Hubert Francisco
- Partner(s): Bea Alonzo (2019–2024); Sue Ramirez (2025–present)
- Relatives: Beth Tamayo (aunt)

Dominic Karl Manalo Roque (Tagalog: [ˈrɔkɛ]; born July 20, 1990) is a Filipino actor model and TV Host He is best known for his role in Aryana and May Isang Pangarap.

== Early life and education ==
Roque was born and raised in the province of Cavite, Philippines. He is also a nephew of actress Beth Tamayo. He attended high school in Imus Institute, Batch 2007, and earned a Tourism degree at De La Salle–College of Saint Benilde.

== Career ==
=== Modelling ===
Dominic began modeling and endorsing several companies before heading into acting. He is a model of Cosmopolitan Talent Agency since 2008, and modeled for the Philippine clothing brand, Penshoppe.

=== Acting ===
In 2010, Roque debuted onscreen in the soap opera Habang May Buhay playing Mark. He later took his first major role in the fantasy-drama series, Aryana in 2012. He played the character Hubert, wherein he co-starred and was paired with Ella Cruz.

While taping the series, he did several guesting roles including Bandila and in the morning talk show Kris TV in which he spoke about issues relating to Kathryn Bernardo.

After Aryana ended in January 2013, he signed his second major role in the noontime drama series May Isang Pangarap where he played the arrogant Alvin. He was paired with Erin Ocampo, an up-and-coming female actress.

In June 2013, Roque had his movie debut in the film Pagpag, an MMFF entry for 2013. He co-starred with Daniel Padilla and Kathryn Bernardo.

On December 25, 2016, Roque starred as Fabian in a horror-thriller film entitled Seklusyon, which was an entry to the 2016 Metro Manila Film Festival. The film received a total of 8 awards; the highest number awarded to a film in the competition.

== Other ventures ==
=== Business ===
Roque owns Black Peak Hypermedia Production, a production company that creates and produces audio-visual presentation and digital ads for other companies.

== Personal life ==
Roque was previously engaged to actress Bea Alonzo. However, the couple confirmed the end of their relationship on a joint Instagram post on February 11, 2024.

On May 31, 2024, Roque filed defamation and cyberlibel complaint-affidavit with the Pasig Prosecutors's Office against Cristy Fermin. He anchored the criminal case on alleged "malicious statements and innuendos" on her YouTube channel 'Showbiz Now Na' streaming television.

On January 11, 2025, Roque and Filipino-American actress Sue Ramirez went Instagram official with their family and friends.

== Filmography ==
=== Film ===
Year	Title	Role
2013	Pagpag: Siyam na Buhay	Rico
2014	Bonifacio: Ang Unang Pangulo	Bully 1
2015	Crazy Beautiful You	Male Car Racer
2016	My Rebound Girl	Ex Boyfriend 3
2016	Seklusyon	Fabian
2017	My Ex and Whys	Jaguar Martinez
2017	Spirit of the Glass 2: The Haunted	Vince
2018	Tres	Jake Fernan
2019	Finding You	Ben
2019	G!	Jimmy

=== Television ===
Year	Title	Role
2010	Habang May Buhay	Mark Alcantara
2012–2018	ASAP	Himself/Performer
2012–2013	Aryana	Hubert Francisco
2013	May Isang Pangarap	Alvin Francisco
2013	Wansapanataym: Flores de Yayo	Carlo
2013	Bandila	Himself/Special Guest
2013	Kris TV	Himself/Guest
2013	It's Showtime	Himself/Special Guest
2013	Maalaala Mo Kaya: Singsing	young Roger Canlas
2014	Luv U	Joel Velasquez
2014	Maalaala Mo Kaya: Bahay	Luman
2014	Moon of Desire	Vince Regalado
2014	Sana Bukas pa ang Kahapon	Teen Leo Romero
2014	Ipaglaban Mo: Akin Ang Asawa Ko	Archie
2014	Wansapanataym: My App #Boyfie	Melvin
2015	Kapamilya Deal or No Deal	Lucky Star (Batch 1)
2015	Home Sweetie Home	Warren
2015	Pangako Sa 'Yo	Mark Delgado
2016	Umagang Kay Ganda	Himself/host
2016	Ipaglaban Mo: Lola	Pong
2016	Maalaala Mo Kaya: Silver Medal	Gino
2017	Langit Lupa	Luis
2017	FPJ's Ang Probinsyano	PO3 Christian Clemente
2018	Maalaala Mo Kaya: Bibliya	Manuel
2018	La Luna Sangre	Jill Imperial
2019	Playhouse	Zeus
2019	Pamilya Ko	David Lardizabal
2022	TiktoClock	Himself/Guest
2022	Family Feud	Himself/Guest Player
2023	Kapuso Mo, Jessica Soho	Himself/Guest
