= Joy Viado =

Filipino character actress, singer, and comedian

- Born: Teresita Joy de Leon Viado; April 10, 1959; Manila, Philippines
- Died: September 10, 2016 (aged 57); Quezon City, Philippines
- Resting place: Santa Rita de Cascia Parish, Philam Homes, Quezon City, Philippines
- Occupations: Actress, comedian
- Years active: 1995–2016
- Known for: Joy, Lola Paula
- Notable work: Luv U Kokey @ Ako; Cinco

Teresita Joy de Leon Viado (April 10, 1959 – September 10, 2016) was a Filipino character actress, singer, and comedian known for playing Lola Paula in Luv U, Bebot in Kokey @ Ako and Aling Gloria in Cinco.

== Early life ==
Teresita Joy de Leon Viado was raised in Pasig. She began her career as part of the children's show Eskwelahang Munti, not until she won the grand prize in the Fe S. Panlilio Scholarship singing contest in 1994, signifying her start of her singing career. In the mid-1990s, she became part of the hit children's show Ang TV. In 2000, she appeared and hosted IBC-13's noontime variety show, Lunch Break.

She acted in theater plays, horror, drama, romance and comedy films. She also appeared in several television shows, particularly from ABS-CBN.

== Filmography ==
=== Film ===
- Isang Kahig, Tatlong Tuka (1995)
- Alfredo Lim: Batas ng Maynila (1995)
- Ang TV Movie: The Adarna Adventure (1996)
- Patikim ng Pinya (1996)
- Wanted Perfect Murder (1997)
- Hiling (1997)
- Bulaklak ng Maynila (1999)
- Kailangan Ko'y Ikaw (2000)
- Mr. Suave (2003)
- Zsazsa Zaturnnah (2006)
- Sikil (2008)
- Desperadas 2 (2008)
- BFF: Best Friends Forever (2009)
- Si Techie, si Teknoboy at si Juana B (2010)
- Cinco (Segment: "Paa") (2010)
- Hating Kapatid (2010) - Madam Alahera
- Petrang Kabayo (2010) - Lina
- Bulong (2011) - Aunt Tyra
- Who's That Girl? (2011)
- Babang Luksa (2011)
- Of All the Things (2012)
- Fling
- Donor
- MNL 43
- My Cactus Heart (2012) - Tita Au
- Moron 5 and the Crying Lady (2012) - Filomena Gaborone
- Suddenly It's Magic (2012)
- Sisterakas (2012) - Bing Cristobal
- Bromance: My Brother's Romance (2013)
- Four Sisters and a Wedding as Sassa (2013)
- Girl, Boy, Bakla, Tomboy as Lola Amparo
- A Thief, a Kid & a Killer
- Da Possessed (2014) - Bless
- My Illegal Wife (2014) - Cora
- The Trial (2014)
- Moron 5.2: The Transformation (2014) - Sarah Joy/Aunt of Aris (flashback)
- Shake, Rattle & Roll XV (Segment: "Flight 666", 2014)
- You're Still the One (2015) - final film appearance
- Smaller and Smaller Circles (2017) - posthumous appearance

=== Television ===
Year	Title	Role	Notes
1994	Oki Doki Doc	Guest	First TV Appearance
1995–2000	Maalaala Mo Kaya		5 Episodes
1995–1996	Familia Zaragoza	Mitchie	
1997–1998	Kaybol, Ang Bagong TV		
1997–2000	!Oka Tokat	Ligaya "Tita Gaying" Montinola	Main Cast
1998–2012	Wansapanataym	Various roles	10 Episodes
2000–2001	Marinella	Doray	
1999	Math-Tinik	Mathnanakot	Guest
1999–2004	Ispup		
2000–2002	Lunch Break	Host	
2003	Ang Iibigin ay Ikaw Pa Rin	Anacleta	
2004	Love to Love		
2004	Marinara		
2004	Maid in Heaven		
2006–2007	Ay Robot!		
2007	Your Song: If You Walk Away	Madam Sonia	
2007	Camera Café	Miss Joy	
2008	Daisy Siete	Otik	
2009–2010	Happy Land	Tita Auring	
2010	Kokey @ Ako	Bebot	
2010	Pidol's Wonderland	Brigit	
2011	Sa Ngalan ng Ina	Maggie Sarmiento	
2011–2012	Bagets: Just Got Lucky	Principal Subong	
2011–2012	Regal Shocker	Linda	Segment: "Punso"
2011–2012	P. S. I Love You	Aling Taleng	
2012	Wako Wako	Senyang	
2012	Sarah G. Live	Theresa	
2012–2014	Luv U	Lola Paula	Last ABS-CBN Appearance
2012–2014	Be Careful with My Heart	Senyang	2 Episodes
2013	Got to Believe	Prof. Henrietta Ilagan Velasco	
2016	Dear Uge	Nestor's mother	Last TV appearance

== Death ==
Viado died on September 10, 2016, at Quezon City General Hospital following a heart attack. She was diagnosed with diabetes for almost three decades, and underwent four debridement surgeries to remove the wounds that she suffered on her legs due to diabetes complications and prevent amputation. She was cremated, her ashes inurned at the Sta. Rita de cascia church's columbarium.
