= Cinco (film) =

- Theatrical release poster
- Directed by: Frasco Mortiz (segment "Braso"); Enrico C. Santos (segment "Paa"); Ato Bautista (segment "Mata"); Nick Olanka (segment "Mukha"); Cathy Garcia-Sampana (segment "Puso")
- Written by: Joel Mercado
- Produced by: Charo Santos-Concio; Malou N. Santos
- Starring: Sam Concepcion; AJ Perez; Robi Domingo; Jodi Sta. Maria; Maja Salvador; Rayver Cruz; Mariel Rodriguez; Pokwang; Zanjoe Marudo
- Production company: ABS-CBN Film Productions
- Distributed by: Star Cinema
- Release date: July 14, 2010
- Running time: 112 minutes
- Country: Philippines
- Language: Filipino
- Box office: ₱61 million

Cinco (lit. 'Five') is a 2010 Filipino horror anthology film produced and released by Star Cinema. The film consists of five different horror stories which each featuring an ensemble cast including Sam Concepcion, AJ Perez, Robi Domingo, Jodi Sta. Maria, Maja Salvador, Rayver Cruz, Mariel Rodriguez, Pokwang and Zanjoe Marudo and are directed by Frasco Mortiz, Enrico C. Santos, Ato Bautista, Nick Olanka, and Cathy Garcia-Sampana. The film was released on July 14, 2010.

== Plot ==
The film is divided into five parts entitled "Braso" (lit. 'Arm'), "Paa" (lit. 'Feet'), "Mata" (lit. 'Eyes'), "Mukha" (lit. 'Face'), and "Puso" (lit. 'Heart'), which all revolve around a hand with an "R.I.P." tattoo.

=== One: Braso (Arm) ===
Three neophytes are brought to a morgue while dressed in lingerie for the final part of their initiation to join a fraternity. After snooping around the place, the boys find a detached arm with an "R.I.P." tattoo of a corpse and it comes to life, much to their terror. The animated hand causes trouble to the group before they escape. Soon after, the Chapter President or "Master" heads inside the room to make out with his girlfriend, only to find out a surprise at the end.

=== Two: Paa (Feet) ===
A young mother visits the wake of her daughter's classmate. There, a rabid dog bites her. Soon after, the ghost of the dead child seeks revenge and haunts her. It is then revealed that she stole the shoes of her daughter's classmate; the girl got hit and run over by a car whilst chasing after her, which caused the kid's amputated feet and death. She suffers hallucinations of the child. In the graveyard, an arm is seen scraping the tombstone with the R.I.P. tattoo. The mother then burns the shoes, ending the ghost's haunting. A year later, the mother is seen on crutches, her leg amputated, finally at peace, raising her only daughter, who promised her that she'll work hard for a new leg.

=== Three: Mata (Eyes) ===
Rose, after witnessing her boyfriend kill a man in a road rage, experiences multiple déjà vu of the same incident, ala Groundhog Day and The Butterfly Effect. To avoid her boyfriend killing the man, she finally shoots him dead instead, hitting his eye. Back in her home, she receives a call from her dead boyfriend who appears in front of her, seemingly killing her or haunting her for the rest of her life. The R.I.P. tattoo is seen on someone lighting a man's cigarette in the scene where there is traffic because a drunkard was blocking the road.

=== Four: Mukha (Face) ===
Rizza is an editor with a cold and heartless attitude. After she fires Mang Bong, the janitor, she is then haunted by ghastly figures. It is then revealed to be a prank by the late night shift employee Eric. After Rizza finds out about this, she becomes infuriated. Eric then receives a call, telling him that Mang Bong died from suicide. During Mang Bong's suicide, an employee waiting outside buys a balut which is handed to him by a man whose hand bears the R.I.P. tattoo. Meanwhile, Rizza enters the elevator and angrily shouts "You're fired!" unaware that the real ghost is behind her. The episode ends with Eric running down the stairs to find her inside the elevator traumatized, and then suddenly becomes crazy.

=== Five: Puso (Heart) ===
Emily, a circus woman with an unflattering appearance uses a love potion on her love interest, Elvis, who works in the carnival's horror house. The potion works but Elvis gets brutally stabbed to death by a previous horror house guest. Hell ensues at the carnival as Elvis returns undead and chases Emily, killing all who try to obstruct him, even his own girlfriend. After Emily cuts off Elvis' arm, it comes back to life and causes her to die from a heart attack. At the end, it is revealed that Elvis is the one with the R.I.P. tattoo that is the same arm in "Braso."

== Cast ==
=== One: Braso (Arm) ===
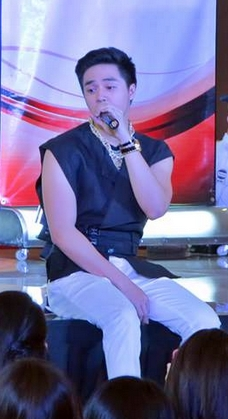
Sam Concepcion portrays as Ivan

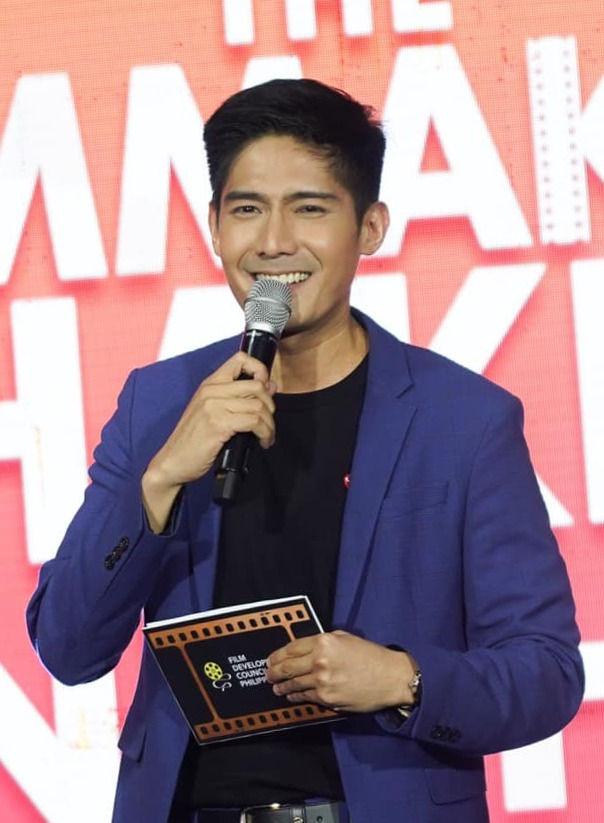
Robi Domingo portrays as Ronald

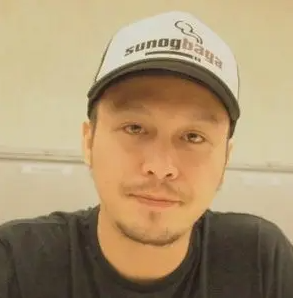
Baron Geisler portrays as Greg

- Sam Concepcion as Ivan
- AJ Perez as Andrew
- Robi Domingo as Ronald
- Baron Geisler as Greg
- Kristel Moreno as Trisha
- Fred Payawan as Frat Member
- Jommy Teotico as Frat Member

=== Two: Paa (Feet) ===
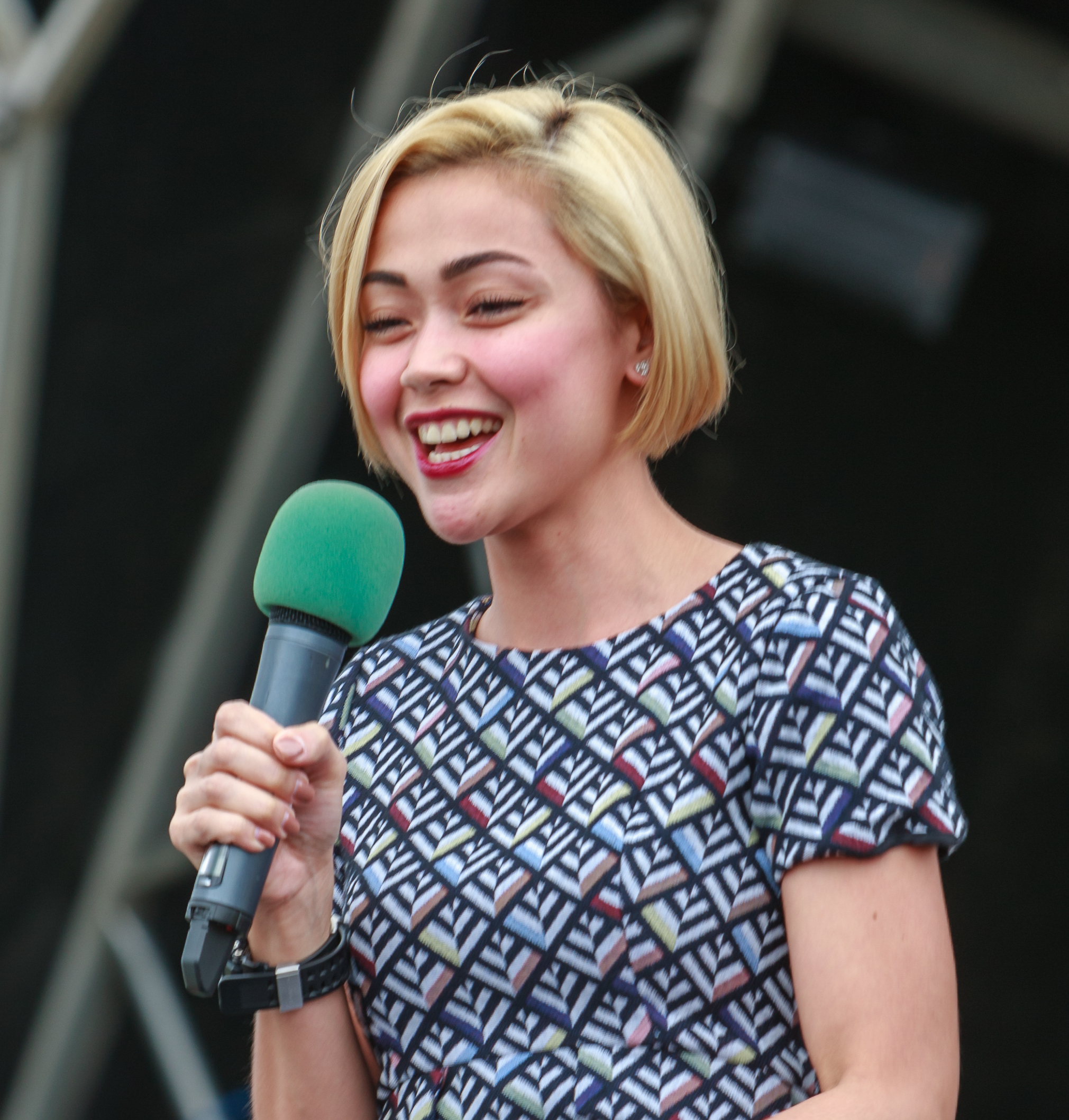
Jodi Sta. Maria portrays as Elisa

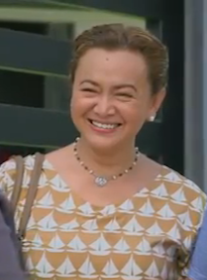
Shamaine Buencamino portrays as Kaye's mother

- Jodi Sta. Maria as Elisa
- Barbie Sabino as Ana
- Gianna Cutler as Kaye
- Joy Viado as Aling Gloria
- Shamaine Buencamino as Kaye's mother

=== Three: Mata (Eyes) ===
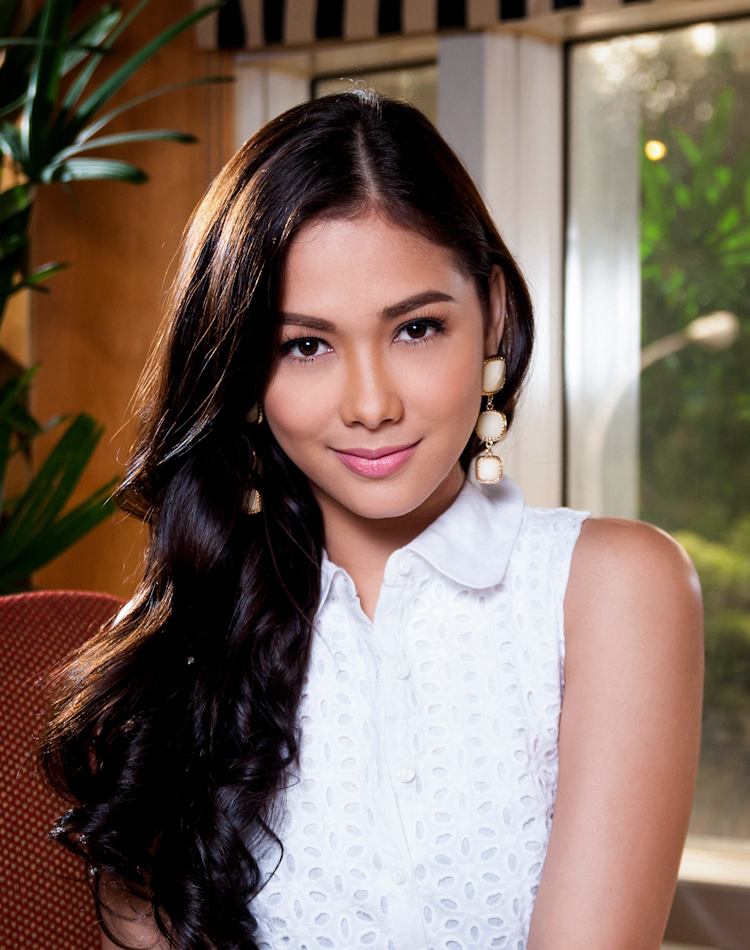
Maja Salvador portrays Rose

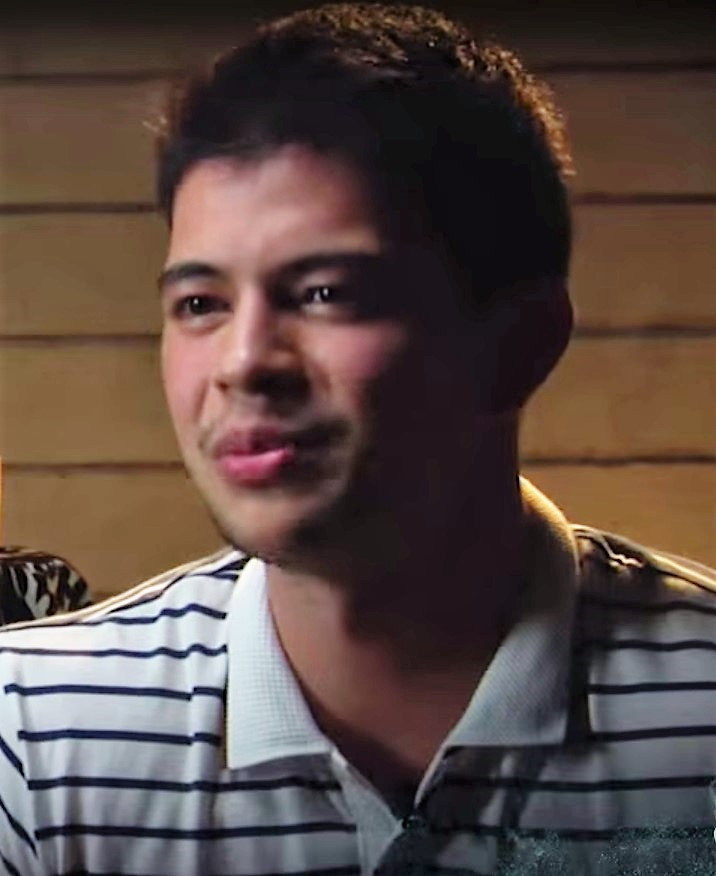
Rayver Cruz portrays Alvin

- Maja Salvador as Rose
- Rayver Cruz as Alvin
- Mark Manicad as Jerome
- David Chua as Road Rage Victim

=== Four: Mukha (Face) ===
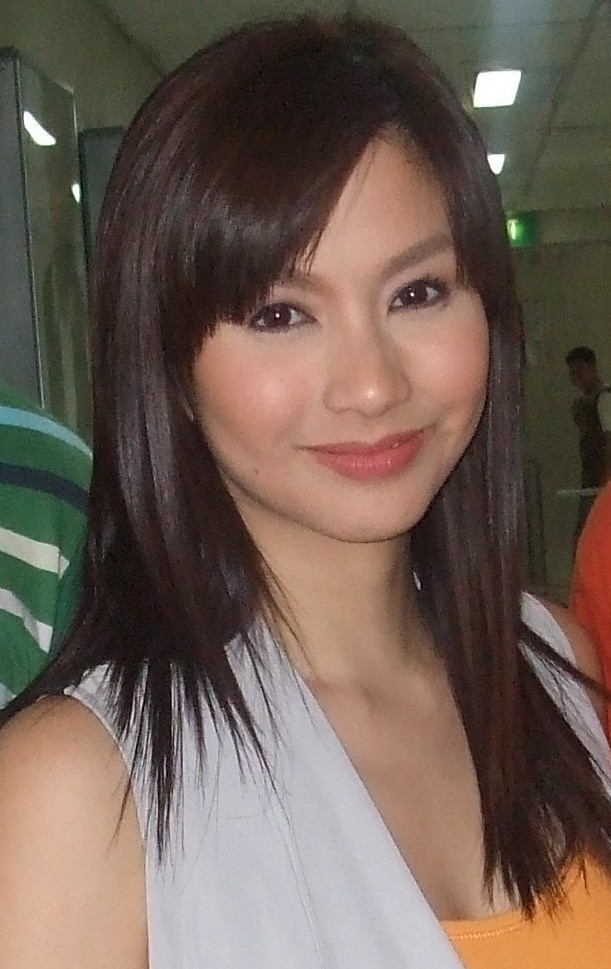
Mariel Rodriguez portrays Rizza

- Mariel Rodriguez as Rizza
- Ketchup Eusebio as Eric
- Nanding Josef as Mang Bong
- Arnold Reyes as Raymond

=== Five: Puso (Heart) ===
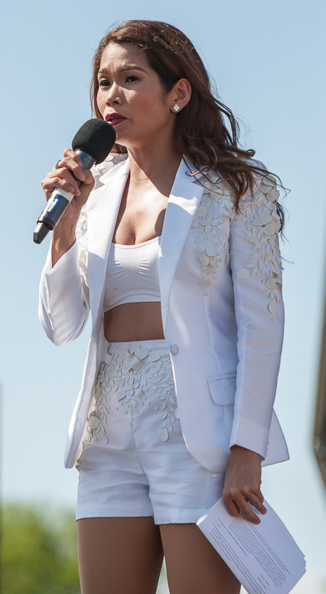
Pokwang portrays Emily

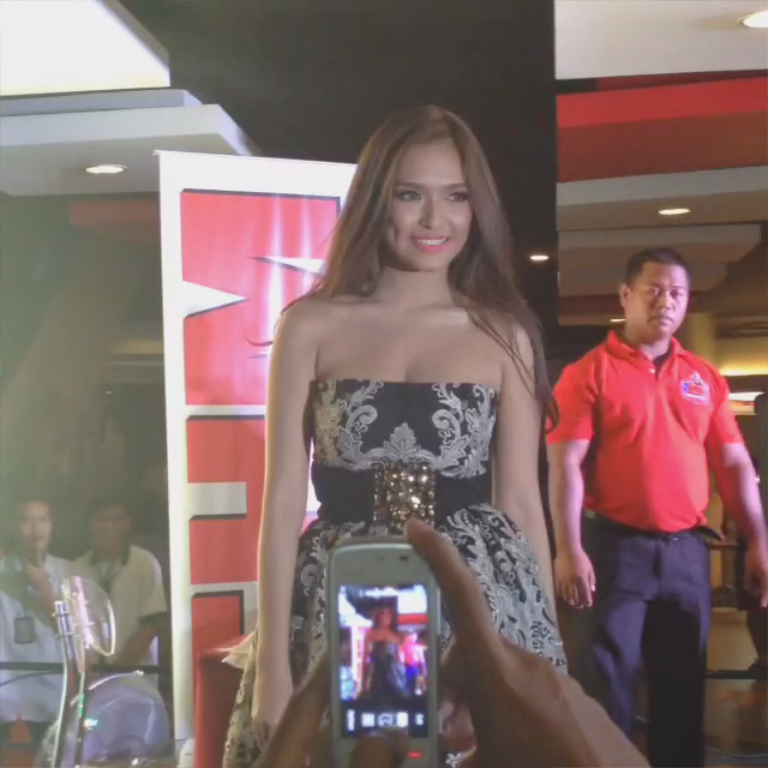
Bangs Garcia portrays Rowena

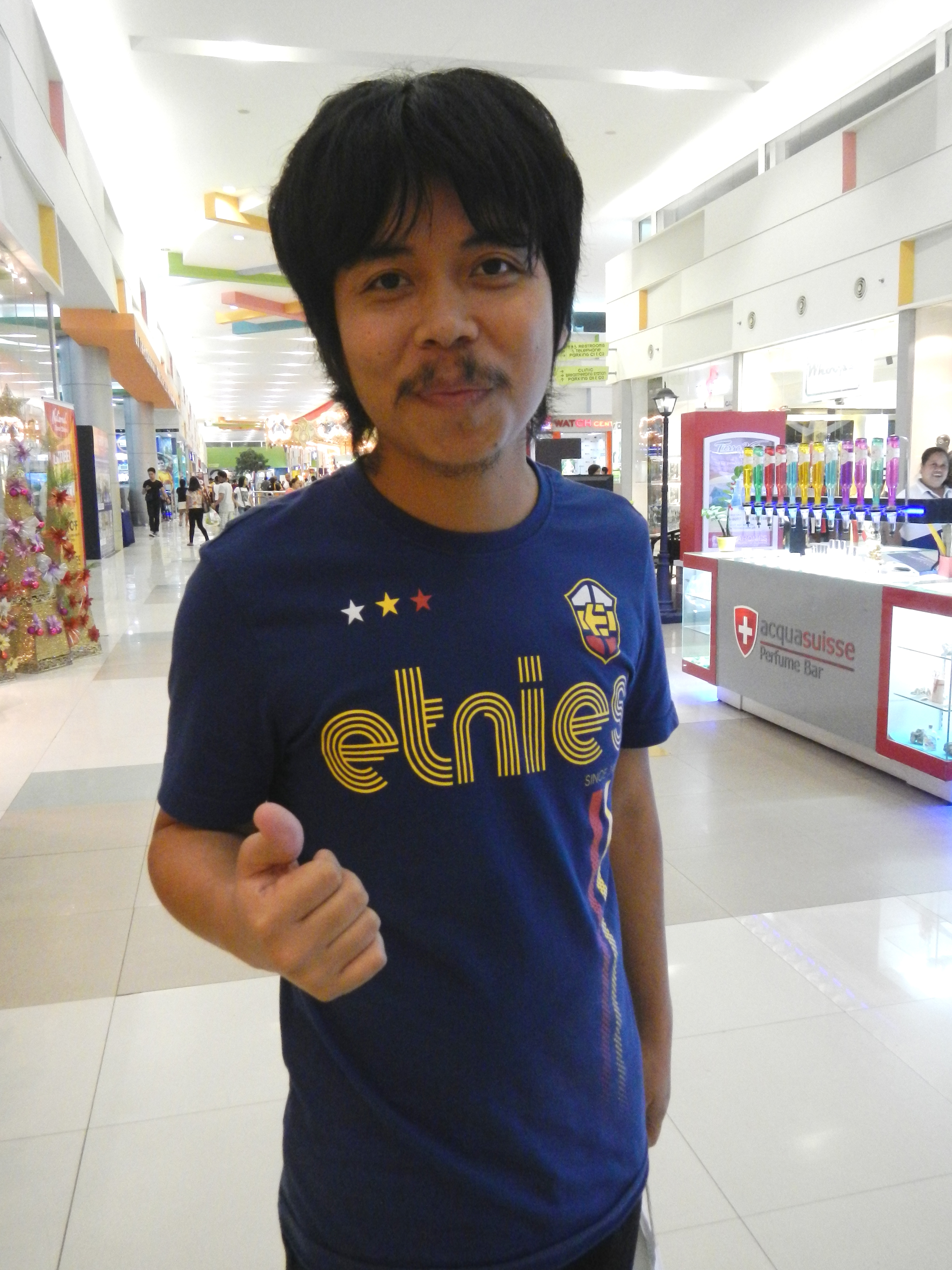
Empoy Marquez portrays Denden

- Pokwang as Emily
- Zanjoe Marudo as Elvis
- Bangs Garcia as Rowena
- Empoy Marquez as Denden
- Malou de Guzman as Madam Osang
- Robin Lavarquez as Elvis' Double

== Reception ==
Cinco debuted with a ₱11 million gross on its first day nationwide. The film gave a total gross of ₱100million, according to Box Office Mojo.

== See also ==
- List of ghost films
