= The Legal Wife =

- Title card
- Genre: Melodrama; Family drama; Romance; Revenge; Tragedy
- Created by: ABS-CBN Studios; Henry King Quitain; Jay Fernando
- Written by: Ronalisa Co; Reign Andre Loleng; Generiza Reyes Moonlight
- Directed by: Rory B. Quintos; Dado C. Lumibao
- Creative director: Johnny delos Santos
- Starring: Angel Locsin; Jericho Rosales; Maja Salvador; JC de Vera
- Opening theme: "Hanggang Kailan Kita Mamahalin" by Angeline Quinto
- Composer: Willy Cruz
- Country of origin: Philippines
- Original language: Tagalog
- No. of episodes: 98

Production
- Executive producers: Carlo Katigbak; Cory Vidanes; Laurenti Dyogi
- Producer: Sackey Prince-Pendatun
- Production location: Metro Manila
- Editors: Joy Buenaventura; Ayen del Carmen-Gulang; John Ryan Bonifacio
- Running time: 30–45 minutes Monday - Friday at 21:15 (PST)
- Production company: Star Creatives

Original release
- Network: ABS-CBN
- Release: January 27 – June 13, 2014

The Legal Wife is a 2014 Philippine television drama series broadcast by ABS-CBN. Directed by Rory B. Quintos and Dado C. Lumibao, it stars Angel Locsin, Jericho Rosales, Maja Salvador and JC de Vera. It aired on the network's Primetime Bida line up and worldwide on TFC from January 27 to June 13, 2014, replacing Maria Mercedes and was replaced by Sana Bukas Pa ang Kahapon.

The series is streaming online on YouTube.

== Plot ==
The story follows the lives of two best friends, Monica Santiago (Angel Locsin) and Nicole Esquivel (Maja Salvador). Friends from childhood, both yearn for a father's love.

Monica's mother Eloisa (Rio Locsin) escapes a controlling, jealous, and violent husband but is only able to take her baby daughter. Her two sons were left behind. They are saved from the streets by her childhood sweetheart Dante Ramos (Mark Gil) who brings them to Daet, Camarines Norte, a beautiful province in the northern region of the Philippines. Dante raises Monica as if she were his child. Meanwhile, Dante leaves his girlfriend Camille Esquivel for Eloisa, unaware that she is pregnant with Nicole. All throughout her childhood, Nicole longs to meet her father.

When Monica turns 7, her mother returns to her husband as she longs to be reunited with her sons. Monica is bewildered by a whole new environment with her wealthy father Javier (Christopher de Leon), and her two brothers Javi (Joem Bascon) and Jasper (Ahron Villena).

When Camille passes away, Nicole is adopted by her landed industrialist and wealthy grandfather, Don Eduardo Esquievel. The two little girls meet during interscholastic intramurals. They learn that they share the same "father" and lose him due to unforeseen circumstances in their lives. They become fast friends and bond like orphaned sisters, remaining close throughout their adult lives.

Upon returning to her true family, Monica learns to love her real father and her two brothers. Javier loves Eloisa, forgives his wife, and is kinder to her. Eloisa reciprocates wholeheartedly and learns to love and care for Javier. Her feelings for Dante fade away.

Despite their painful past, the Santiago family thrives. Javier is a wealthy sardines magnate. Unfortunately, Eloisa's past mistakes is traumatic for the two older children she left behind years ago, deeply wounding the family's psyche, particularly her eldest son Javi who rejects his relationship with his mother and his sister Monica.

Nicole suffers a similar trauma growing up without her father, severely affecting her attitude towards men, constantly seeking love and validation from the wrong men. The two best friends' relationship collide when they love the same man.

Monica meets and falls in love with Adrian (Jericho Rosales), the man she marries, who teaches her how to love again and who will also break her heart.

Despite being madly in love with his wife, the pressures brought about on their lives, arising from the dynamics of their respective families' dysfunctional relationships, Adrian is drawn to his wife's best friend and embarks on an illicit affair with Nicole. Nicole is deeply enamored of her best friend's husband who gives her the care and attention she seeks. She risks her lifelong friendship with Monica.

The discovery of the affair is explosive. The consequences of Adrian's affair and deception, love, and lust, is vividly portrayed in the entire series.

== Cast and characters ==
=== Main cast ===
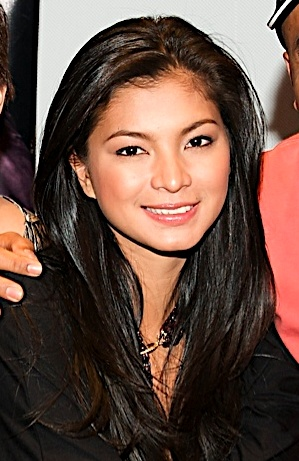
Angel Locsin portrays Monica "Ikay" Santiago-de Villa.

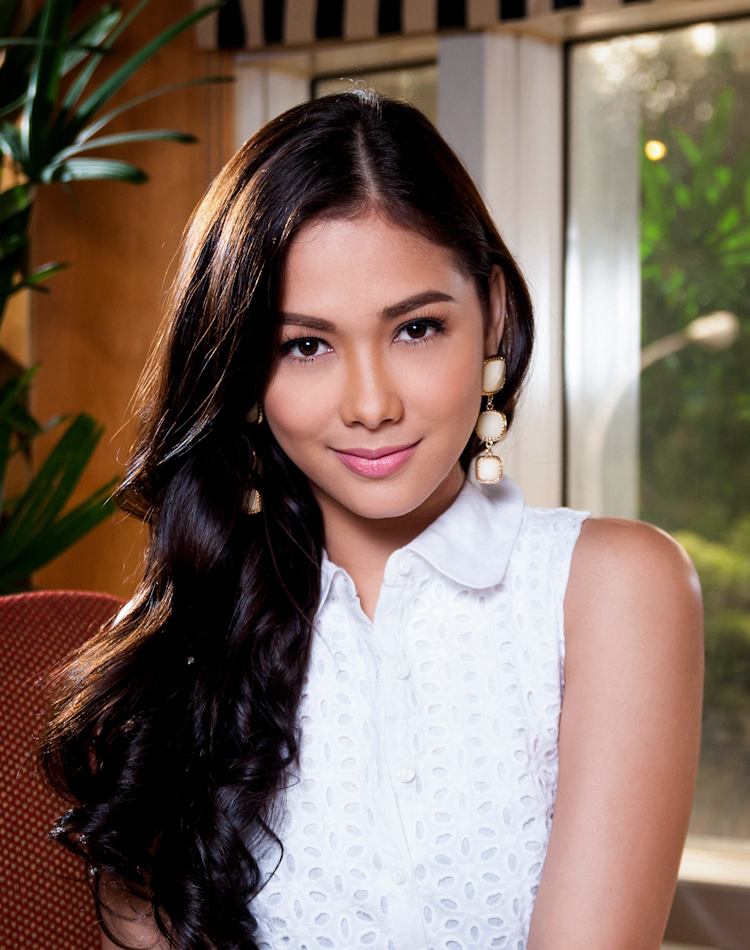
Maja Salvador portrays Nicole Esquivel.

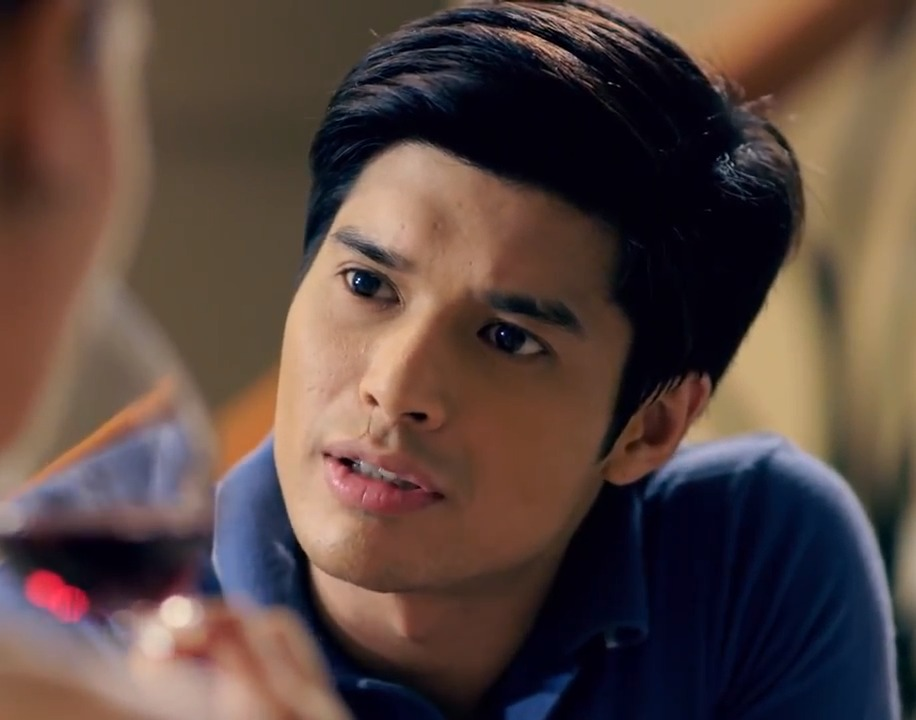
JC de Vera portrays Max Gonzales

- Angel Locsin as Monica "Ikay" Santiago-de Villa
  - Xyriel Manabat as young Monica
- Maja Salvador as Nicole Esquivel
  - Casey de Silvia as young Nicole
- Jericho Rosales as Adrian de Villa
- JC de Vera as Max Gonzales

=== Supporting cast ===
- Christopher de Leon as Javier Santiago Sr.
  - James Blanco as young Javier
- Rio Locsin as Eloisa Santiago
  - Neri Naig as young Eloisa
- Mark Gil† as Dante Ramos
  - Matt Evans as young Dante
- Joem Bascon as Javier "Javi" Santiago Jr.
  - Aaron Junatas as young Javi
- Ahron Villena as Jasper Santiago
  - Bugoy Cariño as young Jasper
- Maria Isabel Lopez as Sandra de Villa
  - Bangs Garcia as young Sandra
- Vandolph Quizon as Samboy
  - Clarence Delgado as young Samboy
- Janus del Prado as Bradley
- Matet de Leon as Rowena
- Yogo Singh as Javier "Thirdy" Santiago, III
  - Jesse James Ongtengco as young Thirdy
- Louise Abuel as Bunjoy S. de Villa
  - Gabriel Sumalde as young Bunjoy

=== Extended cast ===
- Bernard Palanca as Miguel Zapanta
- Joe Vargas as Andrew de Villa
- Pamu Pamorada as Trish de Villa
- Leo Rialp as Don Eduardo "Gramps" Esquivel+
- Odette Khan as Yaya Krising
  - Dang Cruz as young Yaya Krising
- Pinky Marquez as Emma Alvaro
- Michael Flores as Bob Rivera
- Thou Reyes as Jon
- Dionne Monsanto as Rhea
- Zeppi Borromeo as Anton
- Carla Humphries as Audrey
- Frenchie Dy as Kelly
- Sonjia Calit as Gwen
- Johan Santos as Vincent "Vince" Madriaga
- Raquel Monteza as Marissa Gonzales

=== Guest cast ===
- Junjun Nayra as Atty. Hector Vargas
- Ricardo Cepeda as Manuel Gonzales
- Brent Javier as Marco de Leon
- Jaime Fabregas as Leo Zapanta
- Toby Alejar as Ronnie Estrella
  - Manuel Chua as young Ronnie
- Liza Diño as Camilla "Camille" Esquivel
- Bodjie Pascua as Uncle Judge
- Menggie Cobarribias as Don Jacob Santiago
- Nina Ricci Alagao as Monica & Adrian's marriage consultant
- Art Acuña as Monica's lawyer
- Angel Calanoy as Rachelle Roxanne, Adrian's secretary

== Production ==
Prior to the official airing of the show, its working titles were originally known as Hanggang Kailan Kita Mamahalin, and as Langis at Tubig. Jake Cuenca and Andi Eigenmann was originally part of the main cast, but was replaced by JC de Vera and Maja Salvador. Cuenca left to join Ikaw Lamang. Paulo Avelino was also reported to be part of the series but later backed out for personal reasons (and to join Honesto & Bridges of Love). Avelino was later replaced by Jericho Rosales.

Angel Locsin's character, Monica is believed to be inspired from Saint Monica, the patroness of married women, marriage difficulties, victims of adultery and unfaithfulness, victims of (verbal) abuse and alcoholics.

Filming of the series began in October 2013.

=== Scheduling ===
The Legal Wife was originally planned to air on October 28, 2013. It was later pushed back to November 2013 and was set to replace Bukas na Lang Kita Mamahalin. But due to the request of Koreanovela fans and taping conflicts because of Typhoon Haiyan (Yolanda), the airing was postponed because of Korean drama, When a Man Falls in Love. Eventually, the series had its pilot episode broadcast on January 27, 2014, as part of ABS-CBN's Primetime Bida block. Initially, the series was supposed to replace When a Man Falls in Love, but later ends up taking over the timeslot vacated by Maria Mercedes due to the demanding request of Koreanovela fans.

== Reception ==
=== Critical reception ===
Prior to the official airing of the television series, ABS-CBN launched several teasers of the show. One was the slapping scene between Angel Locsin and Maja Salvador's characters aired on January 1, 2014. The trailer was well received and went even viral all over the web, creating parodies and memes.

Since the first episode, the show became a hot topic online and even trended on Twitter worldwide.

=== Television ratings ===
Basing on the data gathered by Kantar Media, the pilot episode earned 21.1% of national viewership, making it the 5th most watched primetime program. It is the first drama on Philippine television to win in its late primetime slot in the ratings in all of its episodes. The finale of The Legal Wife scored its biggest nationwide rating of 36.2%. This currently stands as the country's highest rating by any TV show on late primetime since the Philippines switched to nationwide TV ratings system in 2009.

Media	Pilot	Finale	Rating	Rank		Source
Media	Pilot	Finale	Rating	Timeslot	Primetime	Source
Kantar Media	January 27, 2014	June 13, 2014	21.0%/36.2%	#1/#1	#5/#1	
AGB Nielsen	January 27, 2014	June 13, 2014	23.9%/32%	#1/#1	#4/#1	

== Theme song ==
The theme song Hanggang Kailan Kita Mamahalin? was originally performed by Sharon Cuneta and served as the theme song for the 1996 film Madrasta, which also starred Cuneta alongside Zsa Zsa Padilla and Christopher de Leon. The film was produced by Star Cinema. It was covered by Angeline Quinto and it was used as the theme song for the TV series.

== Re-runs ==
Reruns of the show's episodes aired on Jeepney TV from March 14 to June 14, 2016 (replacing the re-runs of Princess and I); June 10, 2017 to January 14, 2018 (replacing the re-runs of Bagito); August 12 to October 17, 2019 (replacing the re-runs of Iisa Pa Lamang); July 17, 2021 to March 19, 2022 (replacing the re-runs of Dream Dad); and August 11 to December 19, 2025 (replacing the re-runs of Dolce Amore) that also aired on ALLTV.

On March 18, 2020, ABS-CBN announced that the show would be rerun beginning March 23, 2020 via the network's Kapamilya Gold afternoon block, taking over the timeslot of Love Thy Woman, which had finished airing its pre-taped episodes, as part of ABS-CBN's temporary programming changes due to the enhanced community quarantine caused by the COVID-19 pandemic in the Philippines. This rerun was originally supposed to end on May 15, 2020.

However, it was abruptly cut on May 5, 2020, due to the closure of ABS-CBN's free-to-air stations following the cease and desist order issued by the National Telecommunications Commission on account of its franchise expiration.

== International adaptation ==
- Due to its phenomenal success, the series had an adaptation in Malaysia titled Isteri Halal which aired on Malaysian TV channel Astro Ria from February 27 to June 2, 2023.

== See also ==
- List of programs broadcast by ABS-CBN
- List of ABS-CBN Studios original drama series
- List of programs broadcast by Jeepney TV
