= Ngayon at Kailanman (2009 TV series) =

2009 Philippine television drama series

- Title card
- Also known as: Until Forever
- Genre: Romantic drama
- Based on: Ngayon at Kailanman (1992) by Joel Lamangan
- Directed by: Mike Tuviera
- Starring: Heart Evangelista; JC de Vera
- Theme music composer: George Canseco
- Opening theme: "Ngayon at Kailanman" by Jan Nieto
- Country of origin: Philippines
- Original language: Tagalog
- No. of episodes: 80

Production
- Executive producer: Camille Gomba-Montaño
- Production locations: Tagaytay, Philippines
- Camera setup: Multiple-camera setup
- Running time: 30–45 minutes
- Production company: GMA Entertainment TV

Original release
- Network: GMA Network
- Release: June 8 – September 25, 2009

Ngayon at Kailanman (transl. now and whenever / international title: Until Forever) is a 2009 Philippine television drama romance series broadcast by GMA Network. Based on a 1992 Philippine film of the same title, the series is the fourteenth installment of Sine Novela. Directed by Mike Tuviera, it stars Heart Evangelista and JC de Vera. It premiered on June 8, 2009 on the network's Dramarama sa Hapon line up. The series concluded on September 25, 2009, with a total of 80 episodes.

== Cast and characters ==
Cast

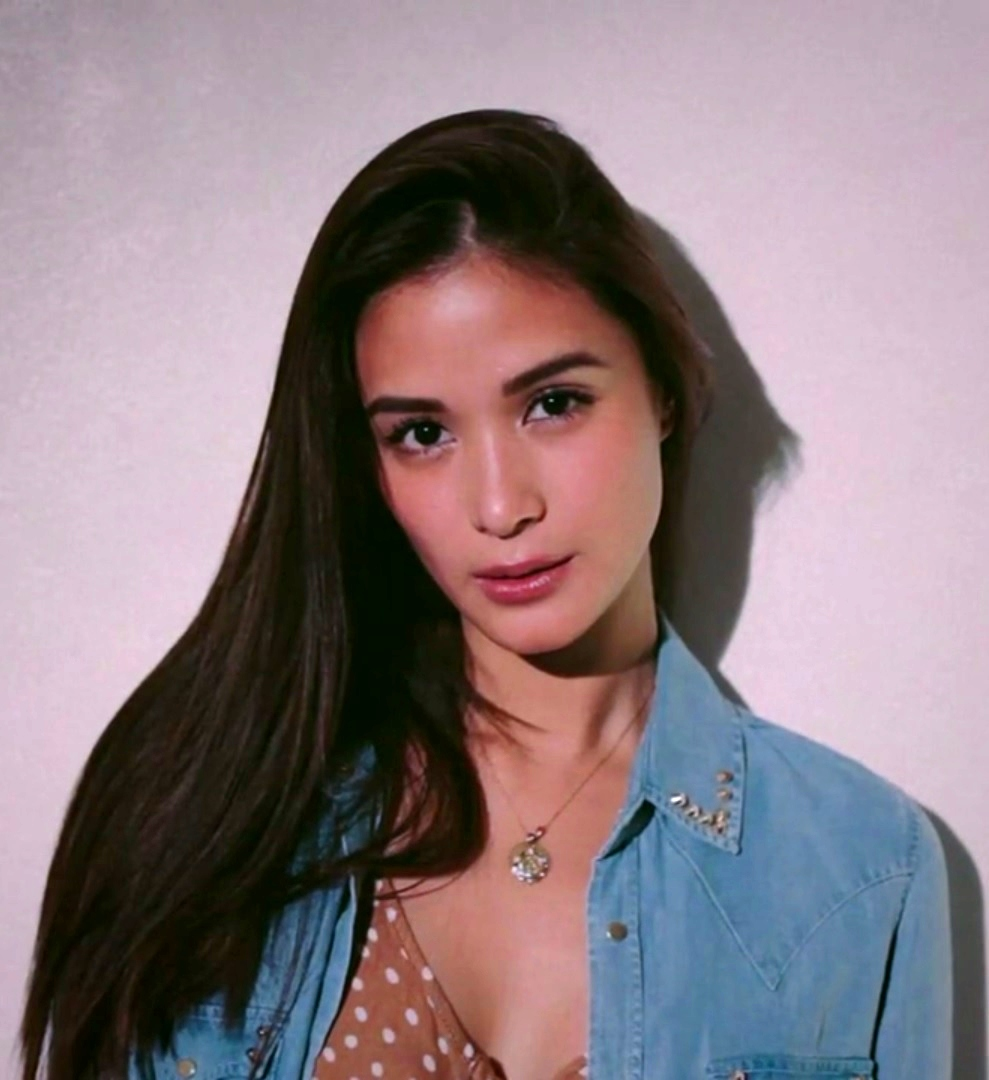
Heart Evangelista

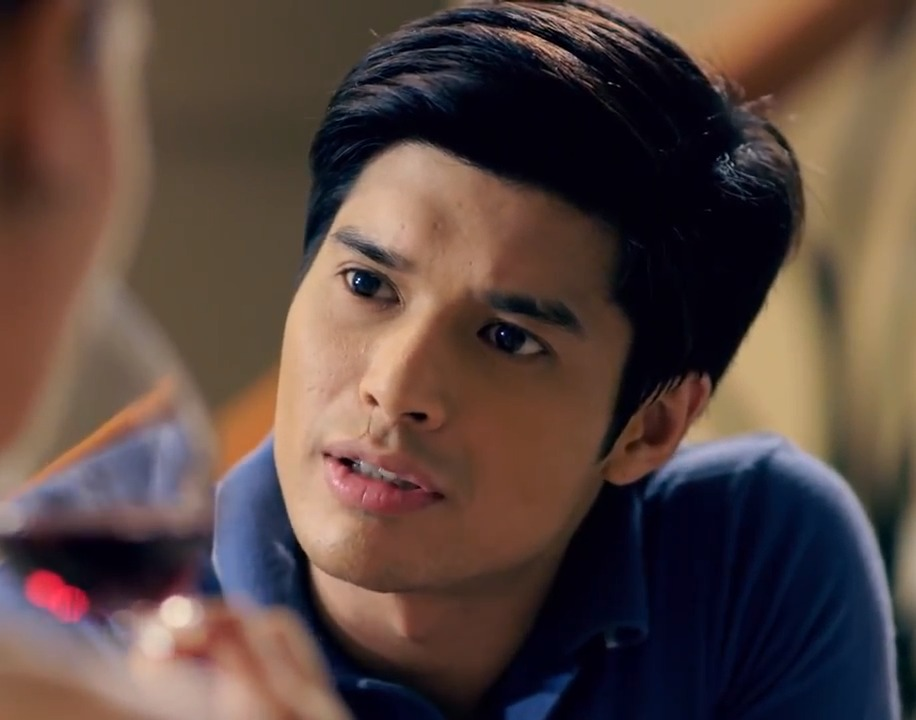
JC de Vera

Lead cast

- Heart Evangelista as Ayra Noche-Torres (Villaflor)
- JC De Vera as Edwin Torres

Supporting cast

- Arci Muñoz as Donna Benitez
- Dion Ignacio as Dags de Leon
- Luis Alandy as Ronald Noche
- Boom Labrusca as William
- Yayo Aguila as Melissa Noche
- Bernard Palanca as Rafa Villaflor
- Mel Kimura as Luding
- Dexter Doria as Inya Benitez
- Ramon Christopher as Leo Cruz
- Angeli Nicole Sanoy as Sabrina Villaflor
- Pen Medina as Vener Torres

Guest cast

- Charlie Davao as Artemio Noche
- Shiela Marie Rodriguez as Mitch
- Gail Lardizabal as Grace

== Ratings ==
According to AGB Nielsen Philippines' Mega Manila household television ratings, the pilot episode of Ngayon at Kailanman earned a 21.1% rating. The final episode scored a 20.2% rating.
