= Nina Girado discography =

Filipina singer

Nina discography
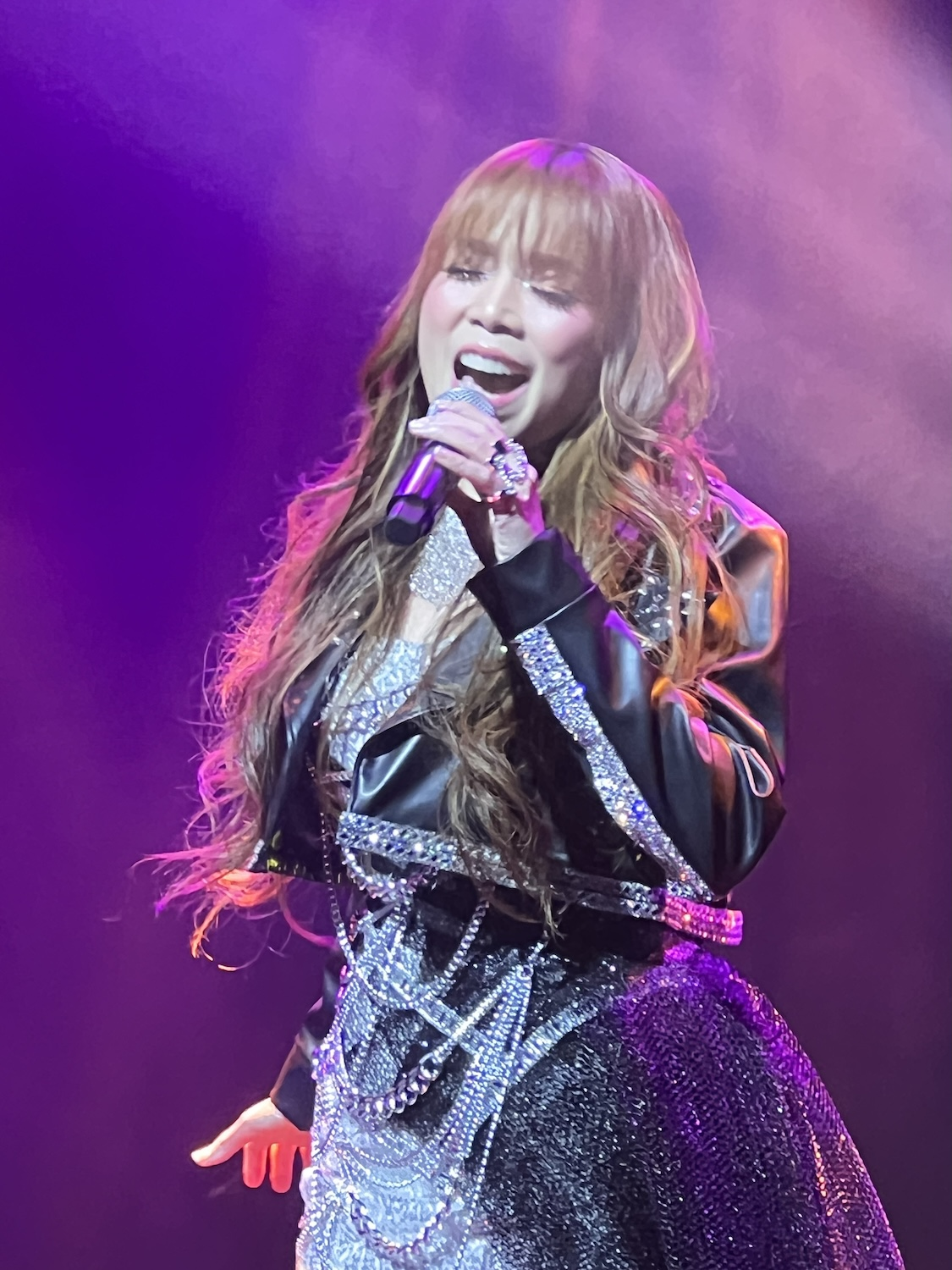
- Nina performing at the Samsung Hall, Taguig City in November 2023.
- Studio albums: 7
- Live albums: 1
- Compilation albums: 4
- Singles: 45
- Promotional singles: 10
- Other appearances: 13

Filipina singer Nina has released seven studio albums, one live album, three compilation albums, one remix album and forty-five singles. In 2002, Nina released her debut album, Heaven, which became one of the best-selling albums of 2003 in the Philippines, certifying double Platinum by the Philippine Association of the Record Industry (PARI). The album earned two consecutive number-one singles on the Philippine charts, the first being "Jealous", which peaked at number one for three weeks and was succeeded by her own rendition of "Foolish Heart". Heaven also made her the only female artist in OPM history to have five Top 5 singles from an album. In December 2003, Nina released her second album, Smile. Lead single, "Make You Mine", peaked at number one in the country, making her the first and only female OPM artist to have three number-one singles in a span of one year. Smile failed to match the commercial success of its predecessor, but it maintained her status as a platinum-selling artist.

In 2005, Nina released her most successful album, Nina Live!, to date, which became the fourth best-selling album in OPM history, eventually selling over 300,000 copies and certifying Diamond in the Philippines. The album reached six times Platinum status within the year of its release, making it one of the fastest-selling albums in the country. It also holds the record for best-selling live album and best-selling Filipino album of the 2000s. Nina Live! earned three number-one singles and yielded her most successful song, "Love Moves in Mysterious Ways", which became the longest running number one song in OPM history, spending twelve consecutive weeks atop the Philippine charts. The preceding and succeeding singles, "I Don't Want to Be Your Friend" and "Through the Fire", topped the charts as well.

In 2006, Nina released her self-titled third studio album, which became her most acclaimed album to date, earning eight Awit Award nominations and certifying double Platinum by the PARI. The album's second single, "Someday", became her seventh number-one single, topping the charts for eight consecutive weeks. In 2007, Nina re-released the album under the title Nina Featuring the Hits of Barry Manilow, which earned two Top 3 singles and was certified Platinum in the Philippines. In 2008, she released her fourth studio album, Nina Sings the Hits of Diane Warren, a cover album which debuted and peaked at number one in the country for six consecutive weeks. Like Nina Live!, the album was certified Gold a week after its commercial release. Its lead single, "I Don't Want to Miss a Thing", became her ninth number-one single in the country. Nina's fifth studio album, Renditions of the Soul, was released in 2009. The album became a commercial success, certifying Platinum in the Philippines in July 2010 despite minimal promotion. Also in 2009, Nina was named as the best-selling female recording artist by the Guillermo Mendoza Memorial Scholarship Foundation. In October 2010, Warner released a 4-disc box set compilation of Nina's singles, entitled Diamond: Greatest Hits 2002-2010.

== Albums ==
=== Studio albums ===
Title	Album details	Certifications
Heaven	Released: August 20, 2002; Label: Warner; Formats: Cassette, CD	PARI: 2× Platinum
Smile	Released: December 12, 2003; Label: Warner; Formats: Cassette, CD	PARI: Platinum
Nina	Released: August 23, 2006; Label: Warner; Formats: CD, digital download	PARI: 2× Platinum
Nina Sings the Hits of Diane Warren	Released: July 25, 2008; Label: Warner; Formats: CD, digital download	PARI: Platinum
Renditions of the Soul	Released: August 27, 2009; Label: Warner; Formats: CD, digital download	PARI: Platinum
Stay Alive	Released: November 19, 2011; Label: Universal; Formats: CD, digital download	
All Good	Released: January 23, 2013; Label: Viva; Formats: CD, digital download	

=== Live albums ===
Title	Album details	Certifications
Nina Live!	Released: February 23, 2005; Label: Warner (#677855); Formats: Cassette, CD	PARI: Diamond

=== Compilation albums ===
Title	Album details
Best of Nina	Released: July 15, 2009 (Korea); Label: Warner Music Korea; Formats: Digital download
Diamond: Greatest Hits 2002-2010	Released: October 13, 2010; Label: Warner; Formats: CD, digital download
Love 2 Love (Acoustic Love Songs) (with Christian Bautista)	Released: April 3, 2012; Label: Warner; Formats: CD, digital download

=== Remix albums ===
Title	Album details
Nina in the Mix: The Dense Modesto Remixes (with DJ Dense Modesto)	Released: October 31, 2007; Label: Warner / Club Myx; Formats: CD, digital download

=== Re-releases ===
Title	Details	Notes
Heaven (Special Edition)	Released: October 2003; Label: Warner; Formats: Cassette, CD	Includes the bonus tracks "Jealous" (Acoustic), "Simula" and "Talk to Me".
Nina Featuring the Hits of Barry Manilow	Released: September 28, 2007; Label: Warner; Formats: CD, digital download	Special limited edition of Nina.; Features five covers of Barry Manilow hits and four bonus tracks.

== Singles ==
=== As lead artist ===
List of singles as lead artist, with selected chart positions, showing year released and album name
Title	Year	PHL Ctlg	Album
"Heaven"	2002	—	Heaven
"2nd Floor"	2002	—	Heaven
"Jealous"	2003	—	Heaven
"Foolish Heart"	2003	—	Heaven
"Loving You"	2003	—	Heaven
"Make You Mine" (featuring Picasso)	2003	—	Smile
"A Girl Can Dream"	2004	—	Smile
"Sayang Naman"	2004	—	Smile
"I Don't Want to Be Your Friend"	2004	—	Diane Warren Presents Love Songs
"The Christmas Song"	2004	—	All Star Christmas Collection
"Love Moves in Mysterious Ways"	2005	—	Nina Live!
"Through the Fire"	2005	—	Nina Live!
"Constantly"	2005	—	Nina Live!
"I Love You Goodbye"	2005	3	Nina Live!
"Burn" (featuring Christian Bautista)	2006	—	Nina Live!
"I'll Always Love You"	2006	—	Non-album single
"Araw Mo"	2006	—	Nina
"I Do"	2006	—	Nina
"Someday"	2006	—	Nina
"I Can't Make You Love Me"	2007	—	Nina
"Collide"	2007	—	Nina
"Somewhere Down the Road"	2007	—	Nina
"If I Should Love Again"	2008	—	Nina
"I Don't Want to Miss a Thing"	2008	—	Nina Sings the Hits of Diane Warren
"There You'll Be"	2008	—	Nina Sings the Hits of Diane Warren
"She's Out of My Life"	2009	—	Renditions of the Soul
"Cold Summer Nights"	2010	—	Renditions of the Soul
"I'm Yours"	2010	—	Renditions of the Soul
"Love Will Lead You Back"	2010	—	Diamond: Greatest Hits 2002-2010
"Hagkan"	2010	—	Stay Alive
"Dance"	2011	—	Stay Alive
"However Much Love"	2012	—	Stay Alive
"Believe in the Dream"	2012	—	Stay Alive
"Hanggang sa Dulo ng Walang Hanggan"	2012	—	Walang Hanggan: The Official Soundtrack, Volume 2
"Don't Say Goodbye"	2012	—	A Secret Affair: The Official Soundtrack / All Good
"Sa Isang Tingin"	2013	—	All Good
"When the Love Is Gone"	2013	—	All Good
"How Can I" (with Jonathan Manalo)	2022	—	Non-album single
"Foolish Heart" (with Hindley Street Country Club) (Note: "Foolish Heart" (2024 version) was released as a single and music video on Spotify and YouTube on October 25, 2024.)	2024	—	Non-album single
"—" denotes a recording that did not chart or was released prior to Billboard Philippines' launch on June 12, 2017.

=== As featured artist ===
Title	Year	Album
"Biyahe Tayo" (Note: "Biyahe Tayo" was released as part of WOW Philippines advertisement, promoting local tourism.) (various artists)	2004	Non-album single
"I'm Never Gonna Give You Up" (with Joe Pizzulo)	2005	All the Best
"Someday" (Future Confessional Remix) (with DJ Dense Modesto)	2007	Nina in the Mix: The Dense Modesto Remixes
"Kaya Natin Ito!" (Note: "Kaya Natin Ito!" was released as a charity single, benefiting the victims of 2009 Typhoon Ondoy and Typhoon Pepeng.) (various artists)	2009	Non-album single
"Star ng Pasko" (Note: "Star ng Pasko" was released as theme song for ABS-CBN's 2009 Christmas Station ID.) (among ABS-CBN All Stars)	2009	Non-album single
"Ikaw ang Bida" (with Joshua and Lloyd)	2016	Non-album single

=== Promotional singles ===
Title	Year	Album
"Simula"	2003	Heaven (Special Edition)
"Talk to Me"	2003	Heaven (Special Edition)
"Shoo-Bee-Doo"	2004	Smile
"I'll Always Stay in Love This Way"	2004	Smile
"The Closer I Get to You" (featuring Thor)	2006	Nina Live!
"I Didn't Mean to Make You Mine"	2007	Nina
"Love Is Contagious"	2007	Nina
"Saving Forever for You"	2008	Nina Sings the Hits of Diane Warren
"Only with You"	2012	Stay Alive
"Hurting Inside"	2013	All Good

== Soundtracks ==
Title	Year	Film / TV Series
"What If"	2004	Masikip sa Dibdib
"I'll Always Love You"	2006	I Will Always Love You
"Collide"	2007	Xenoa
"Hagkan"	2010	Sabel
"Hanggang sa Dulo ng Walang Hanggan"	2012	Walang Hanggan: Book 2
"Don't Say Goodbye"	2012	A Secret Affair
"When the Love Is Gone"	2013	When the Love Is Gone

== Guest appearances ==
Title	Year	Other artist(s)	Album
"Miracle"	2004	Christian Bautista	Christian Bautista
"Never Let You Go"	2004	King, Gloc-9	The Reason I Exist
"I'm Never Gonna Give You Up"	2005	Joe Pizzulo	All the Best
"What Do We Mean to Each Other"	2005	Joe Pizzulo	All the Best
"Lumapit Ka"	2006	—N/a	Hotsilog: The ASAP Hotdog Compilation
"Whenever You Call"	2007	Thor	Soul Obsessions... Duets with Thor
"Come What May"	2008	Gabby Concepcion	Gabby Concepcion
"Muli"	2010	Jay R	Jay R Sings OPM Love Classics
"You Are Not Alone"	2010	—	Kris Aquino: Blessings of Love
"Bagong Pilipinas" (Note: "Bagong Pilipinas" was performed on the inauguration ceremony of former Philippine President Benigno Aquino III.)	2010	Various artists	Non-album single
"Fever"	2010	Richard Poon	I'll Be Seeing You
"I Want to Know What Love Is"	2011	—	Kris Aquino: My Heart's Journey
"Ikaw na Sana"	2011	Noel Cabangon	Panaginip
"Ikaw ang Bida"	2016	JO.LLO (Joshua & Lloyd)	Non-album single

== See also ==
- Nina Girado videography
- List of best-selling albums in the Philippines
