= Nina Girado videography =

Nina performing at the Nina Reborn concert in 2013.

Filipina singer Nina has released five video albums and appeared in forty-five music videos, three films and thirteen television shows. After signing a record deal with Warner Music Philippines, Nina released her first single, "Heaven," in 2002. Its music video was inspired by the cover art of her debut album of the same name where she is dancing in front of the camera while animations appear in the background. In 2003, the music videos for "Jealous" and "Foolish Heart" gained popularity in the Philippines, topping various music video charts in the country. "Jealous" featured actor Cedric Carreon, playing the role of ex-boyfriend in the music video. It won Favorite New Artist in a Video at the 2003 MTV Pilipinas Music Award. The music video for "Loving You" depicts Nina on a journey in a fantasy world to find her dream guy. All music videos from the album Heaven (2002) were directed by Avid Liongoren, except "Foolish Heart." "A Girl Can Dream," the second single from her second studio album Smile (2003) featured singer Christian Bautista as her love interest in a school-themed music video. In 2004, Nina appeared in a cameo appearance for the comedy film Masikip sa Dibdib.

Marla Ancheta directed the Nina Live! (2005) concert album which became a huge success in the Philippines, being released as home video and certifying Diamond by the Philippine Association of the Record Industry (PARI). Nina's performance of "Love Moves in Mysterious Ways" earned three nominations on the Myx Music Awards 2006, while "Burn" won the Favorite Collaboration award. A music video was filmed for "I Love You Goodbye" which featured Nina breaking up with her lover at a bus stop. In 2006, the singles "I Do" and "Someday," from her third studio album Nina (2006), were both directed by Treb Monteras II. The former won the Favorite Urban Video accolade at the Myx Music Awards 2007 while the latter was nominated for Favorite Mellow Video. In 2007, the music video for "Collide" was directed by Sean Lim as theme song for his debut sci-fi film, Xenoa. The Ancheta-directed music video for "I Don't Want to Miss a Thing" was released as lead single from Nina's fourth studio album Nina Sings the Hits of Diane Warren (2008) and it helped the album reach Gold status one week from release. The following year, "There You'll Be" was directed by Lim, and described by Nina as a "thank you" video for her fans.

The music video for "Dance," the lead single from Nina's sixth studio album Stay Alive (2011), was directed by Lim and became a critical acclaim. It featured the cameo appearance of R&B singer Duncan Ramos and Nina in Gaga-ish costumes while dancing to the song. The video was called "futuristic and edgy" by critics who also tagged Nina as the "new dance diva," and it was nominated for Music Video of the Year at the 2012 PMPC Star Awards for Music. In 2012, Owen Reyes directed the music video for "Only with You" which featured behind-the-scenes footage from Nina's Playboy Philippines photo shoot. In the same year, she appeared as herself in the opening credit scenes of the film A Secret Affair, performing "Don't Say Goodbye."

== Music videos ==
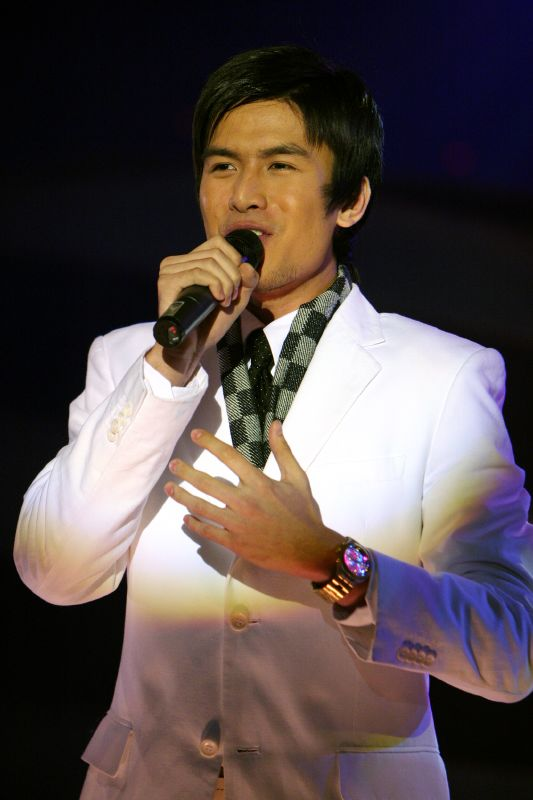
Christian Bautista appears in the music videos for "A Girl Can Dream" and "Burn".

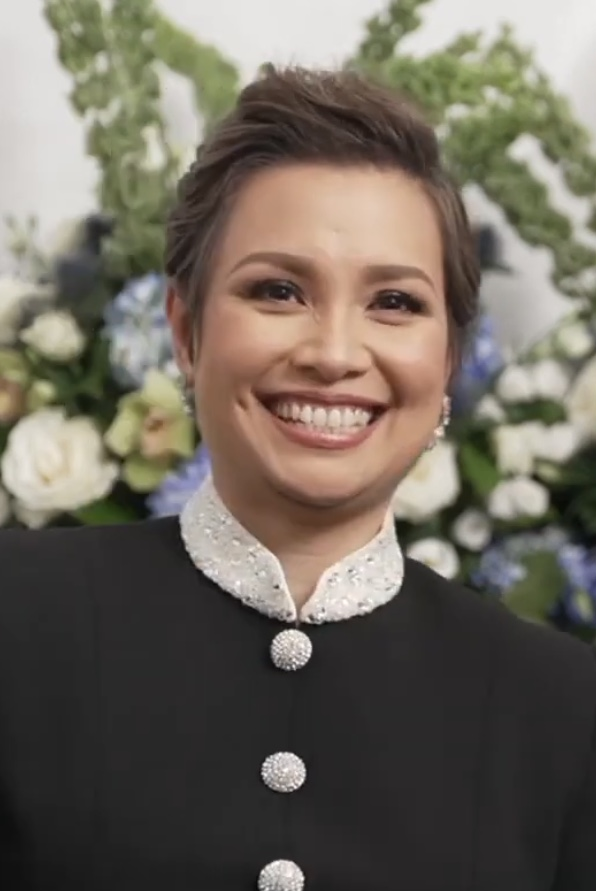
With Lea Salonga and other OPM artists, Nina released "Biyahe Tayo".

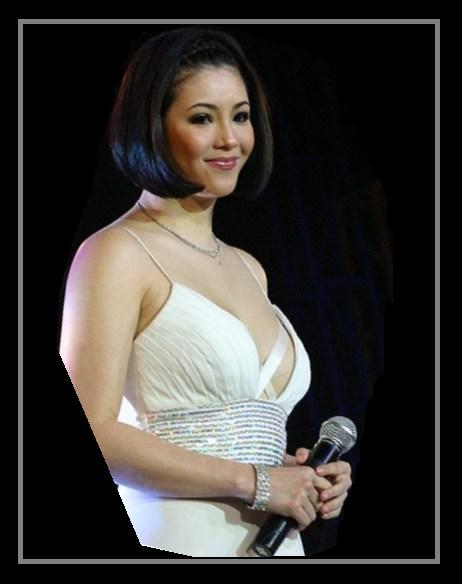
With Regine Velasquez and other OPM artists, Nina released "Kaya Natin Ito!".

Title	Year	Other performer(s)	Director(s)	Album	Ref.
"Heaven"	2002	None	Avid Liongoren	Heaven	
"Heaven" (Boywonder Remix)	2002	Artstrong	Avid Liongoren	Heaven	
"Jealous"	2003	None	Avid Liongoren	Heaven	
"Jealous" (Acoustic)	2003	None	Avid Liongoren	Heaven	
"Foolish Heart"	2003	None	Unknown	Heaven	
"Loving You"	2003	None	Avid Liongoren	Heaven	
"Make You Mine"	2003	Picasso	Unknown	Smile	
"Biyahe Tayo"	2004	Various artists	Noel Nieva	Single-only release	
"A Girl Can Dream"	2004	None	Unknown	Smile	
"Sayang Naman"	2004	None	Unknown	Smile	
"I Don't Want to Be Your Friend"	2004	None	Chi de Jesus	Diane Warren Presents Love Songs	
"The Christmas Song"	2004	None	Chi de Jesus	All Star Christmas Collection	
"Love Moves in Mysterious Ways"	2005	None	Marla Ancheta	Nina Live!	
"Through the Fire"	2005	None	Marla Ancheta	Nina Live!	
"Constantly"	2005	None	Marla Ancheta	Nina Live!	
"I Love You Goodbye"	2005	None	Marla Ancheta	Nina Live!	
"I Love You Goodbye" (non-live version)	2005	None	Unknown	Nina Live!	
"Burn"	2006	Christian Bautista	Marla Ancheta	Nina Live!	
"I'll Always Love You"	2006	None	Jessel Monteverde	Single-only release	
"Araw Mo"	2006	None	Stephen Ngo	Nina	
"Araw Mo" (alternate version)	2006	None	Stephen Ngo	Nina	
"I Do"	2006	None	Treb Monteras II	Nina	
"Someday"	2006	None	Treb Monteras II	Nina	
"Someday" (alternate version)	2006	None	Treb Monteras II	Nina	
"I Can't Make You Love Me"	2007	None	Unknown	Nina	
"Collide"	2007	None	Sean Lim	Nina	
"Somewhere Down the Road"	2007	None	Unknown	Nina	
"If I Should Love Again"	2008	None	Unknown	Nina	
"I Don't Want to Miss a Thing"	2008	None	Marla Ancheta	Nina Sings the Hits of Diane Warren	
"There You'll Be"	2009	None	Sean Lim	Nina Sings the Hits of Diane Warren	
"Kaya Natin Ito!"	2009	Various artists	Dante Nico Garcia	Single-only release	
"Star ng Pasko"	2009	ABS-CBN All-Stars	Paolo Ramos; Tots Sanchez-Mariscal	Single-only release	
"I'm Yours"	2010	None	Warner Music Philippines	Renditions of the Soul	
"Love Will Lead You Back"	2010	None	Warner Music Philippines	Diamond: Greatest Hits 2002-2010	
"Hagkan" (Sabel theme)	2010	None	Don M. Cuaresma; Francis Xavier Pasion	Stay Alive	
"Dance"	2011	None	Sean Lim	Stay Alive	
"Believe in the Dream" (Lyric video)	2012	None	Universal Records	Stay Alive	
"Only with You"	2012	None	Owen Reyes	Stay Alive	
"Don't Say Goodbye"	2012	None	Nuel Crisostomo Naval	All Good	
"Hurting Inside" (Lyric video)	2013	None	Viva Records	All Good	
"When the Love Is Gone"	2013	None	Andoy Ranay	All Good	
"Ikaw ang Bida"	2016	Joshua Desiderio; Lloyd Zaragoza	J. Pacena II	Single-only release	

=== Guest appearances ===
Title	Year	Performer(s)	Director(s)	Album	Ref.
"Coffee Cup"	2005	Paolo Santos	Unknown	Playlist	
"Ha?"	2006	Nyoy Volante	Unknown	Now Hear This	
"Ngayong Pasko Magniningning ang Pilipino"	2010	Gary Valenciano; Toni Gonzaga	Paolo Ramos	Ngayong Pasko Magniningning ang Pilipino: Christmas Songs Compilation	

== Video albums ==
Title	Album details	Content
Nina Videoke	Released: May 2005; Label: Warner; Formats: VCD	10 music videos; Videoke mode
Nina Live!	Released: May 28, 2005; Label: Warner; Formats: VCD, DVD	Concert + 1 music video; Bonus features; Videoke mode
Nina Videoke 2	Released: 2008; Label: Warner; Formats: VCD	13 music videos; Videoke mode
Diamond: Greatest Hits 2002-2010	Released: October 13, 2010; Label: Warner; Formats: DVD	23 music videos (Disc 4)
Sing Along with Nina	Released: 2011; Label: Warner; Formats: DVD	12 music videos; Videoke mode

== Televised concerts ==
Title	Year	Director	Network	Notes	Ref
Pop Ko 'To! The All-Star, All-Hits	2005		Studio 23	Co-headlining performer	
Love2Love2Love	2010		PBO	Co-headlining performer	
Nina Reborn	2013	Paul Basinillo	PBO		

== Filmography ==
Film	Year	Role	Notes	Ref
Masikip sa Dibdib	2004	Herself	Cameo role	
A Secret Affair	2012	Herself	Cameo role	
DAD: Durugin ang Droga	2017	Herself	Indie film, main role	

== Television ==
Television show	Year	Role	Notes
SOP	2002–2003	Herself	
Click	2003	Herself	Guest star
ASAP	2003–2011; 2015–present	Herself	
MYX shows	2004	Herself	Celebrity VJ (May 2004)
Idol Ko si Kap	2005	Lisbeth	Guest star (1 episode)
Daddy Di Do Du	2005	Carol	Guest star (1 episode)
Quizon Avenue	2006	Nina Alajar	Guest star (1 episode)
Channel V Philippines shows	2009	Herself	V.I.P. Artist (November 2009)
Diz Iz It!	2010	Herself / Judge	
Showtime	2011	Herself / Judge	Substitute to Christian Bautista
Pinoy Big Brother: Unlimited	2011	Herself / Weekly task judge	
Wil Time Bigtime / Wowowillie	2012–2013	Herself	
Rising Stars Philippines	2015	Herself / Judge	
Wowowin	2018	Herself	
Live at the Amerasian	2021	Herself	Episode 1: Nina
Sing Galing!	2025	Herself / Judge	

== Notes ==
- A promotional music video for "2nd Floor" was released late in 2002, featuring a live performance by Nina.
- A short clip from the 2004 film Masikip sa Dibdib (directed by Joyce Bernal), where Nina performed her song "What If," is considered as one of her music videos.
- Other songs from Nina Live! received massive airplay in Philippine music channels though were not actually released as commercial singles.
- In 2007, myx music channel aired a promotional video for "Someday" (Future Confessional Remix) which was edited by Mark Geolagon.
- Two different music videos were recorded for "Dance." Version 2 premiered on December 9, 2011, while Version 1 was never released.
