= Diamond: Greatest Hits 2002–2010 =

Greatest hits album by Nina
- Released: October 13, 2010 (Philippines)
- Genre: Pop
- Length: 153:07
- Language: English; Tagalog
- Label: Warner Music Philippines
- Producer: Jim Baluyut (executive); Neil Gregorio

Nina chronology
Renditions of the Soul (2009)	Diamond: Greatest Hits 2002–2010 (2010)	Stay Alive (2011)

Singles from Diamond: Greatest Hits 2002–2010
- 1. "Love Will Lead You Back" Released: September 2010

Diamond: Greatest Hits 2002–2010 is the first official greatest hits album by Filipino singer Nina. It was released in the Philippines on October 13, 2010, by Warner Music Philippines; at the time, she had already left the label. The tracks are arranged nearly in a chronological order: Disc 1 is primarily a collection of Nina's hits from 2002 to 2004 (with some non-album songs from 2005 to 2007); while Disc 2 is primarily a collection of her hits from 2005 to 2010.

== Content ==
Diamond: Greatest Hits 2002–2010 is considered to be Nina's first ever official greatest hits compilation, since Best of Nina (2009) was exclusively released only in South Korea, and did not have any promotion and participation from the singer. In mid-2010, she left the Warner Music Philippines record label and moved to Universal Records. Therefore, she had no contribution and creative input on the production of the album. Also, she was not in control on the contractual agreement of the album. It is clear that she had no participation on the album, since there is no personal message from the singer that can be seen in the album's liner notes. There wasn't even a new song included, just previous releases, and the single "Love Will Lead You Back" was only taken from Nina Sings the Hits of Diane Warren (2008).

The album consists of her commercial singles from her 2002 debut album to her 2009 album, which was taken from her radio show of the same name. It also includes some of her notable songs, all arranged almost in a chronological order: Disc 1 consists of songs from Heaven (2002) and Smile (2003), with some of her non-album releases; while Disc 2 includes singles from the box-office Nina Live! (2005) to Renditions of the Soul (2009). The non-singles and non-album tracks are:

- "Kung Ibibigay Sa'yo" (2002), "Smile" (2003) and "The Closer I Get to You" (2005), which all received notable radio airplay;
- the movie soundtracks "What If" (2004), "I'll Always Love You" (2006) and "Collide" (2007);
- the promotional singles "Shoo-Bee-Doo" (2003), "I'll Always Stay in Love This Way" (2003), "Love Is Contagious" (2006) and "Saving Forever for You" (2008);
- "2nd Floor" (2002), "Burn" (2006) and "I Didn't Mean to Make You Mine" (2006);
- the duet with American singer Joe Pizzulo, "I'm Never Gonna Give You Up" (2005).

=== Artwork ===
The album is a box set, containing four discs—two CDs containing her greatest hits, a minus one (instrumental) CD of her songs, and a DVD containing twenty-three of her official music videos. The album is in a 12"×12" packaging, made of cardboard. The cover has a platinum lettering of the album's title, on which the letter "i" on "Nina" has an unauthentic gem. The album has a unique inlay—on which it is composed of rare photos of Nina, printed on three layers and designed in a diorama format. It also includes a booklet with songwriting credits, lyrics and discography.

The album cover is printed with a big butterfly, which is Nina's favorite insect-figure and symbol. Earlier in her career, she expressed her interest in butterflies, saying "I love butterflies because they're so feminine, something created for us girls only. It was in high school when I started collecting preserved butterflies and until now whenever I see anything with a butterfly I buy it."

== Singles ==
"Love Will Lead You Back", a song originally released by Taylor Dayne, was released as the only single from the album. It was taken from Nina's 2008 album, Nina Sings the Hits of Diane Warren. It received heavy airplay on TV and radio stations in September 2010. During its release, it was rumored to be the farewell video of Warner for Nina. As soon as the album was out, it became clear that the song is the first single of the album. The music video for "Love Will Lead You Back" is a collection of almost all the music videos Nina has recorded under Warner.

== Reception ==
Baby A. Gil of The Philippine Star listed Diamond: Greatest Hits 2002–2010 on top of her list of albums to buy on Christmas. She described the album packaging as "a big box that resembles the LP jackets." She added "This is the big treat for fans of soul siren Nina or for anybody who likes his sound sweet and soothing, and performed by a pretty girl."

On the 24th Awit Awards in 2011, Nina was nominated for two categories, in which one is for the album. Diamond: Greatest Hits 2002–2010 was nominated for Best Album Package.

== Track listing ==
All tracks were produced by Neil Gregorio.

Disc one
No.	Title	Writer(s)	Length
1.	"Heaven"	Brett Laurence; Gary Haase	4:03
2.	"2nd Floor"	Arnie Mendaros	4:08
3.	"Jealous"	Shelly Peiken; Laurence	4:15
4.	"Foolish Heart"	Steve Perry; Randy Goodrum	4:35
5.	"Loving You"	Gerry Paraiso	4:58
6.	"Kung Ibibigay Sa'yo"	Edwin Marollano; Fuzzy	3:35
7.	"Make You Mine" (featuring Picasso)	The 33rd	3:58
8.	"A Girl Can Dream"	Jimmy Santis; Nina Ossoff; Steve Skinner	4:15
9.	"Shoo-Bee-Doo"	Madonna	4:41
10.	"Sayang Naman"	Emil Pama	4:26
11.	"I'll Always Stay in Love This Way"	Boy Katindig	4:33
12.	"Smile"	David Martin; Johnny Douglas	3:44
13.	"What If" (movie theme from Masikip sa Dibdib)	Sean Hosein; Dane DeViller; Andy Goldmark; Jörgen Elofsson	3:49
14.	"I Don't Want to Be Your Friend"	Diane Warren	3:56
15.	"I'm Never Gonna Give You Up" (featuring Joe Pizzulo)	Frank Stallone; Joe Esposito; Vince DiCola	3:31
16.	"I'll Always Love You" (movie theme from I Will Always Love You)	Eric Kaz; Tom Snow	3:51
17.	"Collide" (movie theme from Xenoa)	Marollano	5:51
18.	"The Christmas Song"	Mel Tormé; Robert Wells	3:24

Disc two
No.	Title	Writer(s)	Length
1.	"Love Moves in Mysterious Ways"	Snow; Dean Pitchford	4:27
2.	"Through the Fire"	Cynthia Weil; David Foster; Tom Keane	5:01
3.	"Constantly"	Donald Robinson	4:27
4.	"I Love You Goodbye"	Warren	4:06
5.	"Burn" (featuring Christian Bautista)	Tina Arena; Pam Reswik; Steve Werfel	5:19
6.	"The Closer I Get to You" (featuring Thor)	Reggie Lucas; James Mtume	4:43
7.	"I Do"	Joleen Belle; Michael Jay; Carsten Lindberg Hansen; Joachim Svare	4:43
8.	"Someday"	Nyoy Volante	3:34
9.	"I Can't Make You Love Me"	Mike Reid; James Allen II Shamblin	4:10
10.	"I Didn't Mean to Make You Mine"	Tyler Hayes Bleck; Walter Afanasieff; Andrew Fromm	4:02
11.	"Love Is Contagious"	Taja Sevelle	3:44
12.	"Somewhere Down the Road"	Weil; Snow	4:01
13.	"If I Should Love Again"	Barry Manilow	4:08
14.	"I Don't Want to Miss a Thing"	Warren	4:09
15.	"Saving Forever for You"	Warren	4:28
16.	"There You'll Be"	Warren	3:28
17.	"I'm Yours"	Jason Mraz	4:32
18.	"Love Will Lead You Back"	Warren	4:40

Disc three – Minus One
No.	Title	Length
1.	"Jealous" (minus one)	4:15
2.	"Foolish Heart" (minus one)	4:35
3.	"Loving You" (minus one)	4:58
4.	"I Don't Want to Be Your Friend" (minus one)	3:56
5.	"Love Moves in Mysterious Ways" (minus one)	4:27
6.	"Through the Fire" (minus one)	5:01
7.	"Constantly" (minus one)	4:27
8.	"I Love You Goodbye" (minus one)	4:06
9.	"Burn" (minus one)	5:19
10.	"The Closer I Get to You" (minus one)	4:43
11.	"I Do" (minus one)	4:43
12.	"Someday" (minus one)	3:34
13.	"I Can't Make You Love Me" (minus one)	4:10
14.	"Somewhere Down the Road" (minus one)	4:01
15.	"If I Should Love Again" (minus one)	4:08
16.	"I Don't Want to Miss a Thing" (minus one)	4:09
17.	"There You'll Be" (minus one)	3:28
18.	"Love Will Lead You Back" (minus one)	4:40

Disc four – DVD
No.	Title	Director	Length
1.	"Heaven" (music video)	Avid Liongoren
2.	"Jealous" (music video)	Liongoren
3.	"Foolish Heart" (music video)
4.	"Loving You" (music video)	Liongoren
5.	"Make You Mine" (music video featuring Picasso)
6.	"A Girl Can Dream" (music video)
7.	"Sayang Naman" (music video)
8.	"I Don't Want to Be Your Friend" (music video)	Chi de Jesus
9.	"I'll Always Love You" (music video)	Jessel Monteverde
10.	"Araw Mo" (music video)	Stephen Ngo
11.	"Collide" (music video)	Sean Lim
12.	"The Christmas Song" (music video)	de Jesus
13.	"Love Moves in Mysterious Ways" (music video)	Marla Ancheta
14.	"Through the Fire" (music video)	Ancheta
15.	"Constantly" (music video)	Ancheta
16.	"I Love You Goodbye" (music video)	Ancheta
17.	"Burn" (music video featuring Christian Bautista)	Ancheta
18.	"I Do" (music video)	Treb Monteras II
19.	"Someday" (music video)	Monteras II
20.	"I Can't Make You Love Me" (music video)
21.	"If I Should Love Again" (music video)
22.	"I Don't Want to Miss a Thing" (music video)	Ancheta
23.	"There You'll Be" (music video)	Lim

== Personnel ==
- Jim Baluyut – executive producer
- Neil Gregorio – producer
- Anne Poblador – album design concept
- Joseph de Vera – album art layout

== Release history ==
Region	Release date	Label	Catalogue	Ref.
Philippines	October 13, 2010	Warner Music Philippines	5052498284221	
