= Nina (Nina album) =

Studio album by Nina
- Released: August 23, 2006
- Recorded: 2006
- Studios: Pinknoise Studio, Quezon City
- Genres: Pop, R&B
- Length: 42:29
- Languages: English, Tagalog
- Label: Warner Music Philippines
- Producers: Jim Baluyut, Neil C. Gregorio

Nina chronology
Nina Live! (2005)	Nina (2006)	Nina in the Mix: The Dense Modesto Remixes (2007)

Singles from Nina
- 1. "Araw Mo (promo only)" Released: June 2006; 2. "I Do" Released: August 2006; 3. "Someday" Released: November 2006; 4. "I Can't Make You Love Me" Released: March 2007

Nina is the third studio album by Filipina singer Nina, released in the Philippines on August 23, 2006, by Warner Music Philippines. After the success of her cover album Nina Live!, Nina released an mostly-original studio album as a follow-up. The album debuted at number 19 on the Philippine Albums Chart then it peaked at number 9, staying on the chart into 2007. Nina stated that the album showcases her true self as an artist. Nina recaptures the sound of her first two albums, but only bigger and broader in terms of genre. It consists mostly of "toned-down" songs that were sung in a "soft, near-whispery volume." The project marked the first time that she worked with Jim Baluyut as the new executive of the label. The production also featured international songwriters Walter Afanasieff, Matthew Gerrard and Harvey Mason, Jr.

The idea of recording an all-original album came up when Nyoy Volante wrote two ballad love songs for Nina. She called the songs "beautiful and inspiring," that she ended up recording an album of original songs. She also described Volante to be "very instrumental" in the direction they took for the album. Another reason on why the label departed from the Nina Live! concept is that they did not feel it is right to give the fans two cover albums in a row. Instead, they did the opposite—an all-original studio album which showcases Nina's more delicate, "chill-out" sound—leaving a part of her diva persona behind. The album was originally scheduled to be released in the summer of 2006, but was moved due to conflicts with her scheduled concerts in the United States.

Upon release, Nina received the most positive reviews and the highest critical ratings among Nina albums, with Titik Pilipino calling her "more refined, polished." On January 30, 2007, the album was made available on digital download through iTunes and Amazon.com MP3 Download. It did not equal the commercial success of Nina Live!, but it managed to reach Gold status by the Philippine Association of the Record Industry (PARI) in 2006. In 2007, the album was certified Platinum and earned awards from different organizations. Due to the album's critical and commercial success, Warner decided to re-release it in a special limited edition, featuring the hits of Barry Manilow. The re-release earned three singles, on which the two became commercial hits.

Four singles were released from the album. "Araw Mo", a birthday song that was used for the promotion of Goldilocks' 40 Thoughtful Years Anniversary, was included in the album as a bonus track. The first official single, "I Do", was released along with the album and it managed to pick up substantial airplay. It didn't equal the success of Nina's previous singles, however. "Someday" was released as the album's second single. The song later achieved international success, being covered by popular Southeast Asian artists. "I Can't Make You Love Me", a Bonnie Raitt original, was the last commercial single which quickly became a radio favorite, topping radio charts in the country. "Love Is Contagious", a Taja Sevelle original, is the other cover in the album and later, received limited rotation on radio.

== Background and conception ==
"Her album is not yet out because it's not yet done. It's not yet done kasi di pa siya sinasabihan ng [because she is not yet told by] Warner Music to accomplish some things needed to complete her album. Nina abides— has always abided— by the schedule her label gives her. She is just waiting for their advice. She is not causing the delay."

— Volante, on the reasons that caused delay of the album's release.

In 2000, six years before the production of the album, Nina sent a demo to Warner Music's record label, and was immediately signed up without personal contact and interaction with Ricky Ilacad, the label's managing director at that time. With her powerful rendition of "Foolish Heart", the label knew that it got itself a major pop superstar. After only four years since she released her first single "Heaven" in 2002, it was then followed by three certified multi-platinum albums—with two of them reaching number one, and countless sold-out concerts. After all the success, she felt that she has made it in the music industry by showcasing her own style of music, and wanted to pour out everything to the album. The album was supposed to be released in early summer of 2006, but it was shelved due to conflict with her scheduled shows in the United States. In May 2006, Nyoy Volante, her boyfriend at that time, was reported to have participated in the production of the album, writing a song dubbed as "I Need Your Love". The two were even said to have been wanting to record a duet together.

"The reason why I decided to simply name this album after myself is because, after all the hard work, I feel I've finally made it in the industry by just being what I truly am. I just want my fans to enjoy the best of what I can possibly give."

— Nina, on why she decided to name the album after herself.

No other female OPM artist could match her all-around mastery of pop, R&B. jazz and soul. While others limit themselves to just R&B, ballads, acoustic tributes or the occasional remake, Nina has done a lot more, and she wanted to show it in the album. Her 2005 box-office certified Diamond album Nina Live! is composed of revivals that were recorded live. As a follow-up, she wanted to release a completely different record, an all-original studio album. In an interview, she stated "After Nina Live! last year, people were expecting another all-remakes album. We didn't go that way because we didn't feel it's right to give them two in a row. Besides, I don't want to be typecast as a covers artist." She left her diva side on her third album and worked on a new "toned-down" sound, focusing on the interpretation of the songs rather than the vocal acrobatics. She wanted her self-titled fourth album to be perfect and to capture the singer that she really is.

== Writing and composition ==
"I Do"
A sample from the song, featuring Nina's heavy use of whistle register that is not present on other songs in the album.

Nina is considered to be an all-original album, containing only two revival songs. Nina admitted that the album's direction is opposite to its predecessor, saying "I admit it was a conscious move to veer away from doing covers this time around. Although I am very thankful for the success of the previous album, as an artist I want to try a lot of other things." The album covers a wide range of genre—from a collection of pop, jazzes and R&B to tiny bits of acoustic ballads. Unlike her commercial achievement Nina Live!, which shows Nina's diva persona, the album shows a different unseen side of the singer, giving way to a "more delicate, chill-out, toned-down songstress." It consists mostly of songs that were sung in a soft, "near-whispery" volume evoking a hotel lounge-level of intimacy.

"Nyoy was very much instrumental in the direction we took for this album. The first songs that we had when we were putting up the tracks for the album were his compositions. They were just so beautiful and inspiring that eventually I was encouraged to create an all-original album."

— Nina, on how Volante became an inspiration to the album.

Nina's upper-pitch trajectories are not present on several songs of the album, since only a few of them feature her high vocal belting. So as her whistle register, since the only song that includes her whistling is the upbeat track, "I Do". The song was written by Joleen Belle, Michael Jay, Carsten Lindberg Hansen and Joachim Svare. When it was released as the first commercial single of the album, fans translated the song's title as her sweet answer to her boyfriend at that time, Nyoy Volante, but Nina declined. "Ooh Boy", also penned by Belle, is like the continuation of "I Do", with the same arrangement and a catchier refrain. Both songs were mixed by Ferdie Marquez. Volante and Bobby Velasco worked on the two ballads, "I Need Your Love" and "Someday". "I Need Your Love" has an acoustic-bossa nova arrangement handed by Velasco, and uses chime sound effects. The song was sung by Nina as if she was whispering. It starts with lonesome lyrics, but turns to a positive feeling midway. "Someday" has an optimistic plot as so. It tells a story of a woman who was left by her lover, but still hopes for someone to come and love her even more. The arrangement and music was entirely recorded by Velasco using an acoustic piano. The song was originally planned for one of Volante's albums, but he gave it to Nina instead, saying "I actually wrote "Someday" for one of my albums bago ko ito binigay sa kanya [before I gave it to her]." It later became one of the most-loved OPM ballads. It also shows how Nina produces number-one original hits, as described by Warner in the following statement:

"Nina's musical power should not be underestimated. Her detractors believed her career will go downtrend after the euphoria she made over her revival of a Julia Fordham song. She never relies on a cover version for a hit. Earlier in her career, she created waves with the huge original hit, "Jealous" which her followers have not forgotten up to this day. And she is presently creating a new chart-topper with "Someday"."

Songwriter Andrew Fromm, who penned Christian Bautista's ballad hit "The Way You Look at Me", also lent his songwriting skills on Nina's eponymous album. He composed "I Didn't Mean to Make You Mine" with Walter Afanasieff (who has worked with international acts like Mariah Carey). "Where Is Love" was co-written by Matthew Gerrard, who is known for writing Kelly Clarkson's "Breakaway". The song's arrangement and Nina's delivery are reminiscent of Carey's famous "breathy cooing." "I Can't Make You Love Me" is one of the two covers. Its arrangement is "softer and more delicate." It features simple, straightforward singing with guitar strumming in the background, and a last stanza that's transposed twice to show off the singer's stratospheric vocal range. "Araw Mo", a birthday song that was used to promote Goldilocks, was included as a bonus track. It has a distinctively Filipino tune, with soft delivery by Nina and a non-noisy acoustic background music by Noel Mendez. Darwin Concepcion later added percussion instruments to the song. The album is notable for being one of the few physical releases in the Philippines that contain a gold standard compact disc.

== Critical reception ==
Professional ratings
Review scores
Source	Rating
MYX	(positive)
OPMusikahan.com	4/5 stars
Philippine Daily Inquirer	(positive)
Titik Pilipino	4/5 stars

Nina was a universal acclaim, receiving the most favorable reviews and the highest ratings among all Nina albums at the time. Resty Odon of Titik Pilipino gave the album four out of five stars, stating "Nina does almost everything right, as far as my ears are concerned. She's more refined, polished." He praised the singer's cover version of "I Can't Make You Love Me" and the new original song, "What If", by saying that she made it "seem effortless." However, Odon questioned the presence of Goldilocks theme song "Araw Mo", stating "What's this industry practice of throwing in the artist's TV ad jingles? I don't get it." Rito Asilo of The Philippine Daily Inquirer gave the album a positive review, describing it as a "showcase of Nina's versatility." He praised three original songs—birthday song "Araw Mo", acoustic ballad "Is It Over" and bossa-influenced "I Need Your Love"—calling them "noteworthy." He also praised "Someday" and described it as "the introspective, traffic-stopping [...] that boasts of a rich melody and Nina's emotive panache." The November—December 2006 issue of MYX Magazine contains three reviews of the album, on which all were favorable. One review by Mike Luis of Freestyle positively describes the album, with Luis saying "The mid-tempo tracks are groove-worthy, the slow jams are sexy, and the two remakes were nicely done." He praised the piano ballad, "Someday", and called it "outstanding." In the following review, music publicist Oliver Oliveros described how well the "[Soul Siren]'s versatility and soothing vocals work on the album," praising the songs "Someday" and "Is It Over". However, he found the first two tracks, "I Do" and "Ooh Boy", to be "too Mariah-ish, complete with whistling vocal calisthenics."

== Commercial performance ==
In the Philippines, Nina debuted at number nineteen on the Philippine Top 20 Albums chart, Her Nina Live! album are both charting on the chart. Then after a week it climbed on the top ten peaking at number nine on the chart. Then album fall on the chart into number twelve on its third week. The album left the chart at number twenty on the chart, it spent a total of twenty-one weeks on the chart. The album had sold 15,000 copies in 2006 being certified PARI Gold in the Philippines. Nina had been certified PARI Double Platinum in the Philippines with 60,000 copies.

== Singles ==
"Someday"
A sample from "Someday". The song is Nina's seventh number-one single and was applauded by critics.

"I Can't Make You Love Me"
A sample from "I Can't Make You Love Me". The song was the most well-received track in the album and it became a radio hit.

Only three commercial singles were released from Nina. "Araw Mo", a birthday song written by Juan Ariel Coma and produced by Neil Gregorio, was released in June 2006. The song was recorded for the promotion of Goldilocks Bakeshop's 40th anniversary of service (40 Thoughtful Years). Sales of the single entirely went to charity. "I Do" is the album's first official single. Released in August 2006, it became her first original song to be released as a commercial single since her 2004 Smile hit, "Sayang Naman". Fans misinterpreted the song's title "I do," with rumors that she was ready to settle down with her partner at the time, singer-songwriter Nyoy Volante, but Nina declined in the following statement:

"I am just so happy saying 'I do' to life, to work, and I thank God for all the wonderful blessings He gives me each day."

The music video shows her dancing in a club, singing to the whole song with back-up dancers accompanying her. Although the song was praised by critics, it did not perform as well as expected on charts. In late 2006, there was still no chart-topper. It was until "Someday", a song written by Volante, that she gained another major hit. The single became one of her chart-topping original songs, apart from "Jealous" and "Make You Mine". It is also considered to be the reason behind the singer's success in Southeast Asia, being covered by Japanese singer Yoshika for her 2010 album Redwood Tree, and by Krystal and Jessica Jung of K-pop girl group Girls' Generation for their 2013 comeback concert special Girls' Generation's Romantic Fantasy. The music video of the song depicts Nina inside a house—one scene where she is sitting on a dining table, and another where she is seen in a bedroom. Teenage girls are also seen miming her vocals, while reminiscing in the whole duration of the video. As a final offer to her fans, she released "I Can't Make You Love Me", a cover version of a Bonnie Raitt classic. The song performed well on charts, becoming Nina's eighth chart-topper. Its music video has a sullen and dark plot. It is in black-and-white, where she is seen wearing a black gown, running away from armed military men.

"I Didn't Mean to Make You Mine" was released as a radio-only single in 2007. No video was solicited in music video channels, but the song entered Philippine charts. "Love Is Contagious", a Taja Sevelle original, also received limited radio airplay, and was used in some TV shows as theme song.

== Special Limited Edition ==
On September 28, 2007, Nina released a repackaged version of the album that features her renditions of Barry Manilow songs. It was entitled Nina Special Limited Edition (Featuring the Hits of Barry Manilow). The re-release edition consists of two discs. The first disc is a five-track compilation of Manilow's classic hits, including "Somewhere Down the Road", "Even Now", "One of These Days", "Weekend in New England" and "If I Should Love Again", and also features four bonus songs. "What If" (Acoustic Version) and "Someday" (Band Version) are among the bonus tracks, that were altered from the original arrangement. Both songs also came from the standard edition of the album. "Collide" is another bonus song in the first disc. It was originally released as a theme song for the promotion of the theatrical release of the 2007 Philippine sci-fi indie film Xenoa. The last bonus track, "The Christmas Song", was originally released in November 2004 as part of Warner Music Philippines' All Star Christmas Collection album. The second disc consists of songs from the standard edition of the album. The special limited edition was released in the Philippines just a few days before Nina in the Mix: The Dense Modesto Remixes, and was made available to digital download on October 22, 2007 via iTunes.

=== Critical reception ===
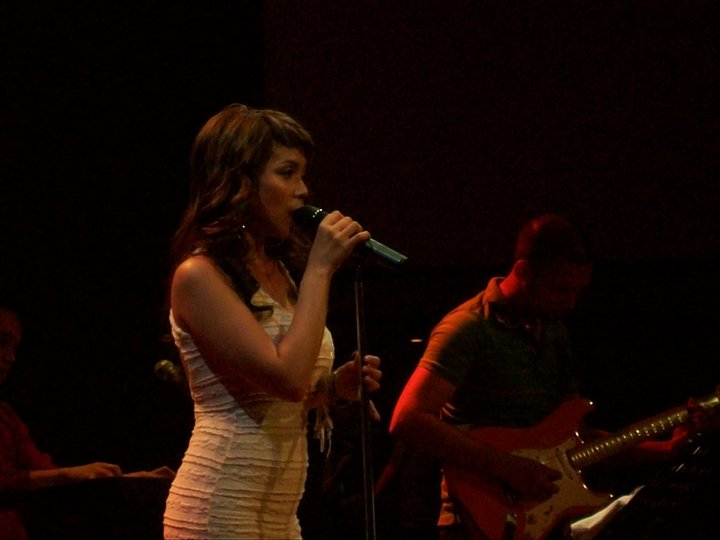
Nina performing "Somewhere Down the Road" at Hard Rock Cafe in 2010.

Nina Featuring the Hits of Barry Manilow received generally favorable reviews from listeners and music critics. OPMusikahan.com gave an average rating of four out of five stars, based from analysis of the album artwork, the sound and Nina's vocals. Resty Odon of Titik Pilipino gave the album three and a half out of five stars, saying "[Nina] works the range and volume she sounds best in [...] If you find Nina's voice inherently charming and classy at the same time, I think there's no further explanation needed." However, he criticized Nina's over-the-top vocals on "Somewhere Down the Road", saying "Nina needs to be reminded that there's such a thing as overkill." All in all, he visualized the album as a "smart move."

=== Commercial performance ===
In March 2008, Nina Featuring the Hits of Barry Manilow was certified Platinum by the PARI for selling over 30,000 units in the Philippines, making Nina double Platinum.

=== Singles ===
Nina Featuring the Hits of Barry Manilow earned three singles. "Collide" was released in August 2007 for the promotion of the Philippine sci-fi indie film Xenoa during its theatrical release. It was used as the only theme song and soundtrack of the movie. The music video for the song was directed by Sean Lim, who also directed the film. The video depicts Nina in various outfits and included scenes from the film. It was also shot with special effects. In 2008, "Collide" was nominated for Best Song Written for Movie/TV/Stage Play on the 21st Awit Awards, but lost the award to "Paano Kita Iibigin" by Piolo Pascual and Regine Velasquez. "Somewhere Down the Road" was released in October 2007 as the first commercial single for the re-release edition. It received negative response from critics, who called Nina's vocals an "overkill," but it charted at number two in the country and proved as a commercial success. The song's official music video only features footage of her, while recording the song in a studio. "If I Should Love Again" was released in January 2008 as the second and last commercial single from the special limited edition. It performed as well as the lead single, "Somewhere Down the Road", on various charts and earned Nina another commercial hit. The music video for the song features scenes, where Nina is seen sitting on chair and roaming the streets during an evening.

== Promotion ==
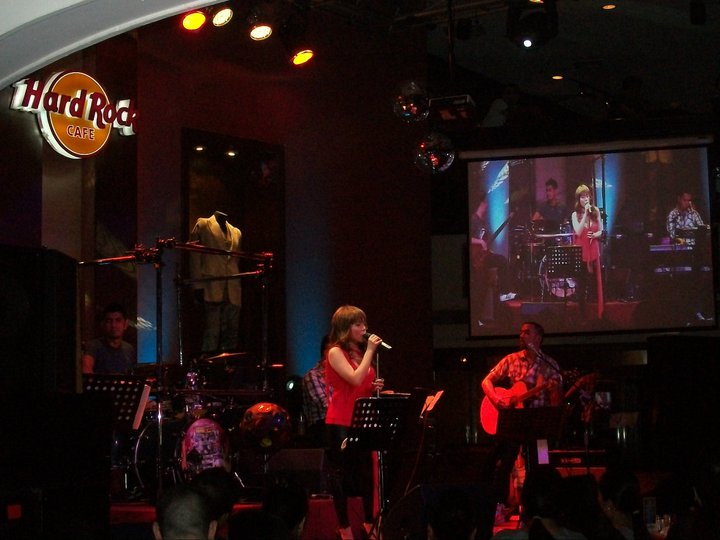
Nina performing "Someday" on her gig at Hard Rock Cafe in 2010.

On September 8, 2006, Nina (the album) was launched at Bagaberde, Roxas Boulevard, where Nina sang the album's songs. Nyoy Volante, her boyfriend at that time, also performed as a special guest. In the same month, she launched the album on ASAP '06, performing the first single, "I Do". She has also sung the album's songs, notably the number-one hit "Someday", on her major concerts, bar gigs, mall tours and TV appearances throughout 2006 and 2010. Such notable major concerts that promoted the album include All That Glitters at Bagaberde in August 2006 (which had a repeat in December 2006), Nina at Her Best at the Aliw Theatre (2006), and a major concert at Quezon Convention Center, Lucena City (2007). She performed a few tracks from the album—including "Love Is Contagious", "I Didn't Mean to Make You Mine", and "Ooh Boy"—in a 2007 episode of MYX Live, hosted by Jett Pangan. On January 4, 2009, during the introduction of the segment "Sessionistas" on musical variety show ASAP (where she has been part of since 2003), she performed "Someday". Also in 2009, she went to Singapore when she was invited to guest on STAR World's Asia Uncut. She sang "Someday", and was later interviewed by Jon Neirmann. The episode aired on May 8, 2009. On the August 14, 2010 episode of GMA-7's Comedy Bar, she performed "Someday" while an over-acting superfan was trying to distract her. She also performed the same song, followed by her 2008 hit single "I Don't Want to Miss a Thing", on the MYX Mo 2010.

On March 18, 2011, Nina performed three songs, including "I Do" and "Someday", at the Pattaya International Music Festival 2011 Galaxy Stage in Thailand. Before the event, she was given the "Golden Key to the City of Pattaya" recognition by the city's mayor, and got to hang out with other Asian artists who participated on the music festival.

== Awards and accolades ==
The album earned Nina eight nominations on the 2007 Awit Awards, making it the album that earned her the most nominations on the award. Two of the awards are for People's Choice. She won three out of her eight nominations—namely Best Engineered Recording for "I Do", People's Choice Song of The Year for "Someday" and People's Choice Best Female. "Someday" was also nominated for Song of the Year and Best Ballad, but lost to Kamikazee's "Narda" and Gary Valenciano's "In Another Lifetime". "I Need Your Love" was nominated for Best R&B, but lost to "A Single Soul" by Reuben Laurente and Regine Velasquez. The album was also nominated for Best Selling Album of the Year, losing the award to the APO Hiking Society tribute. On the other hand, Nina was nominated for Best Performance by a Female Recording Artist, losing the title to Lani Misalucha. On the 2007 MYX Music Awards, she was nominated on three categories—Favorite Female Artist, Favorite Mellow Video for "Someday" and Favorite Urban Video for "I Do". She won Best Urban Video, but lost the other two awards to Rachelle Ann Go and Christian Bautista "Invincible". She also won the R&B Artist of the Year title on the 2007 Philippine Hip-Hop Awards, beating the likes of Kyla and Jay R. On the 2007 USTv People's Choice Award, Nina was awarded the Students' Choice of Music Video for "Someday". On the 2007 ASAP Pop Viewer's Choice Awards, she was nominated on Pop Female Performance for "Someday", but lost to Sarah Geronimo's "Carry My Love".

On the 2006 ASAP 24K Awards, the album was awarded for certifying Gold by the Philippine Association of the Record Industry (PARI). In 2007, it was given another recognition, this time by the ASAP Platinum Circle, for certifying Platinum.

List of awards and nominations

Year	Award	Category	Result
2007	ASAP Pop Viewer's Choice Awards	Pop Female Performance ("Someday")	Nominated
2007	Awit Awards	Best Performance by a Female Recording Artist	Nominated
2007	Awit Awards	Song of the Year ("Someday")	Nominated
2007	Awit Awards	Best Selling Album of the Year (Nina)	Nominated
2007	Awit Awards	Best Ballad ("Someday")	Nominated
2007	Awit Awards	Best R&B ("I Need Your Love")	Nominated
2007	Awit Awards	Best Engineered Recording ("I Do")	Won
2007	Awit Awards	People's Choice Favorite Female Artist	Won
2007	Awit Awards	People's Choice Favorite Song of the Year ("Someday")	Won
2007	MYX Music Awards	Favorite Female Artist	Nominated
2007	MYX Music Awards	Favorite Mellow Video ("Someday")	Nominated
2007	MYX Music Awards	Favorite Urban Video ("I Do")	Won
2007	Philippine Hip-Hop Awards	R&B Artist of the Year	Won
2007	USTv People's Choice Awards	Students' Choice of Music Video ("Someday")	Won

== Track listing ==
All tracks were produced by Neil Gregorio.

No.	Title	Writer(s)	Length
1.	"I Do"	Joleen Belle, Michael Jay, Carsten Lindberg Hansen, Joachim Svare	4:43
2.	"Ooh Boy"	Belle, Robyn Johnson, Jens Lumbholt, Phillip Dencker	3:29
3.	"Where Is Love"	Franne Golde, Kasia Livingston, Matthew Gerrard	4:08
4.	"I Can't Make You Love Me"	Mike Reid, James Allen II Shamblin	4:10
5.	"I Need Your Love"	Nyoy Volante	3:39
6.	"I Didn't Mean to Make You Mine"	Tyler Hayes Bleck, Walter Afanasieff, Andrew Fromm	4:02
7.	"Love Is Contagious"	Taja Sevelle	3:44
8.	"What If"	Nina Ossoff, Jim Dyke, Harvey Mason, Jr.	4:22
9.	"Is It Over"	Eric Cabahug	3:57
10.	"Someday"	Volante	3:34
11.	"Araw Mo" (English: "Your Day" [bonus track])	Juan Ariel Coma	2:34

Special Limited Edition

Disc 1 – Nina Featuring the Hits of Barry Manilow
No.	Title	Writer(s)	Length
1.	"Somewhere Down the Road"	Tom Snow, Cynthia Weil	4:01
2.	"Even Now"	Barry Manilow, Marty Panzer	3:54
3.	"One of These Days"	Ron Hawkins, Jacqueline Magill	3:34
4.	"Weekend in New England"	Randy Edelman	4:35
5.	"If I Should Love Again"	Manilow	4:08
6.	"What If (Acoustic Version)" (bonus track)	Ossoff, Dyke, Mason	4:45
7.	"Someday (Band Version)" (bonus track)	Volante	3:27
8.	"Collide" (bonus track)	Edwin Marollano	5:51
9.	"The Christmas Song" (bonus track)	Mel Tormé, Bob Wells	3:24

Disc 2 – Nina
No.	Title	Writer(s)	Length
1.	"I Do"	Belle, Jay, Hansen, Svare	4:43
2.	"Ooh Boy"	Belle, Johnson, Lumbholt, Dencker	3:29
3.	"Where Is Love"	Golde, Livingston, Gerrard	4:08
4.	"I Can't Make You Love Me"	Reid, Shamblin	4:10
5.	"I Need Your Love"	Volante	3:39
6.	"I Didn't Mean to Make You Mine"	Bleck, Afanasieff, Fromm	4:02
7.	"Love Is Contagious"	Sevelle	3:44
8.	"What If"	Ossoff, Dyke, Mason	4:22
9.	"Is It Over"	Cabahug	3:57
10.	"Someday"	Volante	3:34
11.	"Araw Mo" (bonus track)	Coma	2:34

== Album credits ==
Credits taken from Nina's liner notes.

Production

- Ramil Bahandi – vocal recording
- Jim Baluyut – A&R administration, executive producer
- Darwin Concepcion – musical recording
- Rey Cortez – album cover layout
- Neil C. Gregorio – A&R administration, producer, mastering and sequencing, vocal supervision
- Ferdie Marquez – arranger, mixing, sequencing and programming
- Arnie Mendaros – vocal supervision
- Anne Poblador – album cover concept
- Efren San Pedro – vocal recording
- Dante Tanedo – arranger
- Bobby Velasco – arranger

Personnel

- Darwin Concepcion – additional percussion
- Nina Girado – lead vocals, back-up vocals
- Ferdie Marquez – additional back-up vocals
- Noel Mendez – guitars
- Bobby Velasco – acoustic piano

Recording locations

- Pinknoise Studio (Quezon City, Philippines) – vocal recording
- Chili Red Studio – sequencing and mastering

== Charts and certifications ==
Chart (2006–2007)	Peak position
Philippines (Albums Chart)	9

=== Nina ===
Country	Provider	Certification	Sales
Philippines	PARI	2× Platinum	65,000+

=== Nina Featuring the Hits of Barry Manilow ===
Country	Provider	Certification	Sales
Philippines	PARI	Platinum	35,000+

== Release history ==
Country	Edition	Release date	Label	Catalogue
Philippines	Standard (CD + bonus track)	August 23, 2006	Warner Music	51011-6739-2
Philippines	Re-release edition	September 28, 2007	Warner Music	505.144.239.072.8
South Korea	Standard (CD)	January 30, 2007	Warner Music	085364462862
United States	Standard (download + bonus track)	January 30, 2007	WEA	
United States	Re-release edition	October 22, 2007	WEA	
