= Best of Nina =

Greatest hits album by Nina
- Released: July 15, 2009 (South Korea)
- Recorded: 2001–2006 (in the Philippines)
- Genre: Pop; R&B
- Length: 64:06
- Language: English; Tagalog
- Label: Warner Music Korea
- Producer: Jim Baluyut (exec.); Neil Gregorio; Ferdie Marquez; Mike Luis

Nina chronology
Nina Sings the Hits of Diane Warren (2008)	Best of Nina (2009)	Renditions of the Soul (2009)

Best of Nina (Korean: 컴필레이션) is the first compilation album by Filipina singer Nina. It was released exclusively in South Korea on July 15, 2009 by Warner Music Korea.

== Background ==
Best of Nina contains eight hit singles and four other tracks taken from her 2002 album Heaven until 2006 album Nina, plus three unplugged tracks were also included from her 2005 live album Nina Live!.

In the said album, some of her hit singles were not included such as "Heaven", "Make You Mine", "A Girl Can Dream", and "I Don't Want to Be Your Friend". Instead of including these four hit singles on the album, she replaced them with some of her notable unreleased tracks such as "Is It Over", "Can't Say I Love You", "What If" and her OPM classic remake, "I'll Always Stay in Love This Way". Tracks from Nina Featuring the Hits of Barry Manilow, Nina Sings the Hits of Diane Warren and Renditions of the Soul were not included.

== Track listing ==
No.	Title	Writer(s)	Original album	Length
1.	"Someday"	Nyoy Volante	Nina, 2006	3:34
2.	"Foolish Heart"	Steve Perry, Randy Goodrum	Heaven, 2002	4:35
3.	"Jealous"	Shelly Peiken, Brett Laurence	Heaven	4:15
4.	"Araw Mo" (Happy Birthday-생일축하송)	Juan Ariel Coma	Nina	2:34
5.	"Is It Over"	Eric Cabahug	Nina	3:57
6.	"Can't Say I Love You"	Nina Girado, Emanuelle Ruffinego	Smile, 2003	4:37
7.	"Loving You"	Gerry Paraiso	Heaven	4:58
8.	"What If"	Sean Hosein, Dane DeViller, Andy Goldmark, Jörgen Elofsson	Smile	3:49
9.	"I Can't Make You Love Me"	Mike Reid, James Allen II Shamblin	Nina	4:10
10.	"I Do"	Joleen Belle, Michael Jay, Carsten Lindberg Hansen, Joachim Svare	Nina	4:43
11.	"I'll Always Stay in Love This Way"	Boy Katindig	Smile	4:33
12.	"Sayang Naman"	Emil Pama	Smile	4:26
13.	"Love Moves in Mysterious Ways" (Live)	Tom Snow, Dean Pitchford	Nina Live!, 2005	4:27
14.	"Through the Fire" (Live)	Cynthia Weil, David Foster, Tom Keane	Nina Live!	5:01
15.	"Constantly" (Live)	Donald Robinson	Nina Live!	4:27
Total length:				64:06

== Release history ==
Country	Release date	Format	Label	Ref.
South Korea	July 15, 2009	Digital download	Warner Music Korea	
