= Nina in the Mix: The Dense Modesto Remixes =

Remix album by Nina and DJ Dense Modesto
- Released: October 31, 2007 (Philippines)
- Recorded: 2002–2007
- Genre: Dance; electronic
- Length: 63:27
- Language: English
- Label: Warner Music Philippines; Club Myx
- Producer: Jim Baluyut (exec.); Anne Poblador (album producer)

Nina chronology
Nina (2006)	Nina in the Mix: The Dense Modesto Remixes (2007)	Nina Sings the Hits of Diane Warren (2008)

Dense Modesto chronology
Sitti in the Mix: The Dense Modesto Remixes (2007)	Nina in the Mix: The Dense Modesto Remixes (2007)	The Cascades Goes Ballroom: The Dense Modesto Remixes (2007)

Professional ratings
Review scores
Source	Rating
Titik Pilipino	4/5 stars

Nina in the Mix: The Dense Modesto Remixes is the first remix album by Filipino singer Nina, and the second by DJ Dense Modesto. It was released in the Philippines on October 31, 2007 by Club Myx, in collaboration with Warner Music Philippines. After the success of Sitti in the Mix: The Dense Modesto Remixes, Warner and the Club Myx record label decided to team up for the second time to release another Dense Modesto remix album, this time approaching the pop-R&B influenced Nina. The album's concept is a "ride in the air," forming the sound of an airplane flight. The album includes dance remixes of her notable hits such as "Jealous", "Foolish Heart", "I Don't Want to Be Your Friend", and "Through the Fire".

The album was made available on digital download through iTunes on December 11, 2007.

== Release and reception ==
Without any promotion and participation from Nina, the album was able to enter the top 10 of retailer charts in the Philippines. It also received generally positive reviews from critics and listeners, with Lorelie Dino of Titik Pilipino, stating "It may have been a slow start, but Dense Modesto worked it up in gaining momentum, and the album ends off greatly." She was impressed with "Through the Fire (Street Shoe)", "Jealous (Alternate)", and "Someday (Rain Cloud)", saying "I find the latter ones more superior." However, she thought the Nina's name caught the attention more than the "Dense Modesto remixes" title, explaining "You can mistake the album as being Nina's rather than the remixes that they are." She ended up giving the album four out of five stars.

An unofficial music video for "Someday" (Future Confessional Remix) was created and aired on MYX to advertise the album and help it increase in sales. Other adverts of the album were posted on DJ Dense Modesto's official Multiply page.

== Track listing ==
1. "Intro: Modesto Air" – 0:29
2. "Someday" (Future Confessional Remix) – 4:52
3. "Through the Fire" (Amber Club Remix) – 4:46
4. "Love Is Contagious" (Prescription Remix) – 7:11
5. "Heaven" (Angel 31 Remix) – 4:47
6. "I Can't Make You Love Me" (Love Like Club Remix) – 4:54
7. "Jealous" (12:16 Club Remix) – 4:44
8. "Loving You" (Catwalk Bliss Remix) – 5:21
9. "Sunlight" (8/20 Remix) – 4:37
10. "Foolish Heart" (Closure Lounge Remix) – 4:23
11. "I Don't Want to Be Your Friend" (1800BYEMYLUV Remix) – 5:53
12. "Interlude: Through the Fire" (Street Shoe Remix) – 2:47
13. "I Do" (VP Stomp Remix) – 4:10
14. "Interlude: Jealous" (Alternate Remix) – 2:33
15. "Outro: Someday" (Raincloud Remix) – 1:54

== Personnel ==
- Jim Baluyut - executive producer
- Anne Poblador - album producer
- Nina Girado - lead vocals, back-up vocals
- DJ Dense Modesto - remixing

== Sales ==
Country	Provider	Certification	Sales
Philippines	PARI	—	10,000+

== Release history ==
Country	Edition	Release date	Label	Catalogue
Philippines	Standard (CD)	October 31, 2007	Warner Music Philippines	505.144.243.132.2
United States	Standard (digital download)	December 11, 2007	WEA	
