= Renditions of the Soul =

Studio album by Nina
- Released: August 27, 2009 (Philippines)
- Recorded: 2008–2009
- Studio: Wave 89.1 Studio (Pasig, Philippines)
- Genre: Pop; R&B
- Length: 72:01
- Language: English
- Label: Warner Music Philippines
- Producer: Jim Baluyut (exec.); Nina Girado (also exec.)

Nina chronology
Best of Nina (2009)	Renditions of the Soul (2009)	Diamond: Greatest Hits 2002-2010 (2010)

Singles from Renditions of the Soul
- 1. "She's Out of My Life" Released: August 14, 2009; 2. "Cold Summer Nights" Released: February 2010; 3. "I'm Yours" Released: May 2010

Renditions of the Soul is the fifth studio album by Filipina singer Nina, released in the Philippines on August 27, 2009 by Warner Music Philippines. The album contains a selection of the most requested songs from her "all-male hits special" weekly acoustic radio show of the same title, which aired on Wave 89.1 during Friday and Sunday evenings. The idea and concept of the project came from Nina herself, and she approached the station's manager to carry it out. She is co-executive producer of the album, with Warner head manager Jim Baluyut, and produced all the tracks herself (a first time for the singer). All the tracks are the actual recordings from Nina's Renditions of the Soul radio sessions.

Upon release, the album received positive response from music critics who stated that Nina's voice fits perfectly to each song. In 2010, she won Best Female Recording Artist on the Box Office Entertainment Awards, where the Guillermo Mendoza Memorial Scholarship Foundation named her as the best-selling female recording artist of 2009—having sold 100,000 copies of her Nina Live!, Nina Sings the Hits of Diane Warren and Renditions of the Soul albums. Additionally, the album was surprisingly a commercial hit. Despite having the least promotion, it managed to reach Platinum by the Philippine Association of the Record Industry (PARI) in July 2010, denoting 20,000 units sold. In December 2010, it became one of the best-sellers in the country during Christmas season.

Three singles were released from the album. "She's Out of My Life" was the first official single. It did not have a music video to be solicited to music channels, and therefore, lacked promotion. The second single was "Cold Summer Nights", originally recorded by Francis Magalona. Like the first single, it was not given enough promotion, but it managed to pick up airplay on TV and radio. "I'm Yours" was released as the third and last single off the album. Unlike the two releases, it had a music video that came up from Warner's Nina sing-along contest. Since, Nina has left the label during the time, she had no participation on the video's release.

== Background ==
"It's fulfilling to sing any song, maybe a cover or an original song, just the fact that I'm singing is fulfilling enough. I have no fear of being a typecast, because the supporters, fans, are the ones who requested it [cover songs]."

—Nina, on being criticized with releasing too many cover songs.

Since Nina entered the Philippine music industry in 2000, she has been known for doing cover versions of popular classic hits. In 2002, her debut album Heaven was released along with two chart-topping singles, "Foolish Heart" and "Loving You", which are both revivals. Aside from performing well commercially, both singles were critically acclaimed. In 2003, she covered three more songs on her second studio album Smile, namely "A Girl Can Dream", "Shoo-Bee-Doo" and "I'll Always Stay in Love This Way". "A Girl Can Dream" was released as an official single, while the other two were released as radio-only singles due to warm reception. In 2005, Nina proved herself as the great cover-girl, when she released her first live cover album Nina Live!. The album was a huge commercial success, certifying Diamond by the Philippine Association of the Record Industry (PARI). The album's lead single, "Love Moves in Mysterious Ways", also became her most successful single when it topped the charts for twelve consecutive weeks in record time. In 2006, her self-titled album was released and it contains two revivals, namely "I Can't Make You Love Me" and "Love Is Contagious". Both songs received positive response from critics. The album was then re-issued in 2007, containing a second disc of Barry Manilow classic songs. The re-issue showcases Nina's renditions of Manilow hits such as "Somewhere Down the Road" and "If I Should Love Again". In 2008, she released her second cover album entitled Nina Sings the Hits of Diane Warren, wherein she took on Warren-penned ballads. She released "I Don't Want to Miss a Thing" and "There You'll Be" as commercial singles.

== Development and recording ==
Wave 89.1, Renditions of the Soul's radio station.

"Never Again"
A sample from "Never Again". Nina admitted the song as one of her favorites during the "Justin Timberlake Night" on her radio show. Her rendition of the song was praised by critics.

In 2008, Nina hosted an "all-male hits" special weekly acoustic radio show on Wave 89.1 radio station, entitled Renditions of the Soul. It aired during Friday and Sunday evenings. The show's concept is about the Soul Siren, singing the most-requested songs that were originally performed and recorded by male artists, may it be local or foreign. Nina conceptualized the show herself, saying "They [listeners] send their requests. Some send letters along with the requests and binabasa ko rin 'yun [I also read them]." She added that the station's manager is her friend, and that she is glad that he approved on her idea. Each night of the show has its respective theme or concept, where Nina sings songs that are related to each other—may it be originally recorded and performed by the same artist or may it have one lyrical content and plot. Some nights of the show just featured request letters and mails from fans and listeners, where she reads and later, performs them. Nina described how the album became a reflection of herself in the following statement:

"I can say that the songs I sing in my albums very much represent who I am... Because when I sing songs, I try to make it my own even if it was done originally by another artist."

The radio show had a long run, airing on the station for approximately three years; from 2008—2010. Every evening episode has its respective conception, where the songs are either requests from fans, sung originally by the same artist, or have similar lyrical stories. Nina's cover of "Can't Find the Words to Say Goodbye", a song originally recorded in two different versions by David Gates and Billy Dean who both wrote and composed it, aired on February 29, 2008. Her version was described as the "classiest, most polished reinvention" along with the less familiar tune of the Justin Timberlake original, "Never Again". The "Justin Timberlake Night" episode aired on May 29, 2009. She performed "What Goes Around... Comes Around" and "Until the End of Time" alongside "Never Again". Like Timberlake's version, she performed "Never Again" in an acoustic piano arrangement. She admits that it is one of her favorite songs. In an April 25, 2008 episode, she performed songs that were requested by listeners. One song that was included in the album was "Half Crazy", originally by Johnny Gill. She recorded it along with "P.D.A. (We Just Don't Care)" by John Legend.". "Real Thing", a Kalapana original, was recorded a few days earlier on April 11, 2008. On May 1, 2009, she recorded "Go the Distance" alongside the Phil Collins original, "You'll Be in My Heart".

== Critical reception ==
Professional ratings
Review scores
Source	Rating
Manila Bulletin	(positive)
Philippine Daily Inquirer	(positive)

Without any commercial promotion, Renditions of the Soul managed to peak inside the top five of album retailer charts in the Philippines, staying there for months. Aside from its commercial success, the radio show and the album itself were well received by music critics and listeners. Rito Asilo of The Philippine Daily Inquirer gave the album a positive review, noticing the more unplugged sound delivered by it. He praised four songs—the covers of Justin Timberlake's acoustic ballad "Never Again", Robin Thicke's pop hit "Lost Without U", Bread's classic hit "Can't Find the Words to Say Goodbye" and Rannie Raymundo's OPM hit "Why Can't It Be"—saying "it's the less familiar tunes [...] that get the classiest, most polished reinventions." Manila Bulletin gave the album a similarly positive review, stating "The 17-track album is more emotionally subtle, yet the songs just have as equally powerful messages like her previous hits [...] Nina's singing perfectly renders the message of every selection: Love, longing and the purity of emotional surrender."

== Commercial performance ==
In the Philippines, Renditions Of The Soul did not debut on the charts on its first week of release, then until (October 1, 2009) the album debuted at number eleven on the Philippines Top 20 Albums chart. After two weeks the album climbed at number three on the chart due to increase of the sales of the album. According to Titik Pinoy data, the album spent fifteen weeks on the chart. As of July 2010, the album had sold 20,000 copies in the Philippines making if certified Platinum in PARI.

== Singles ==
"Cold Summer Nights"
A sample from "Cold Summer Nights". The song became the most popular single of the album, being sent to radio and played on TV shows.

"She's Out of My Life" was released on August 14, 2009 as the first single from Renditions of the Soul. According to Nina, all of the songs in the album were candidates in selection for the lead single. Despite a large number of choices, the song managed to be chosen by Warner as the first single due to warm positive reception by critics and listeners. The song was originally recorded by Michael Jackson, and it is lyrically intended for a male singer. However, when Nina covered the song, she altered the title line "she's out of my life" into "he's out of my life," making an entirely female-perspective version of the song. Despite her alteration on the song's title, the original title was kept in the copy prints. The song had no music video, defining lack of promotion for the album. Since then, it was only considered to be a promotional single. Prior to the release of the album, Nina has performed the song in various TV appearances.

"Almost all of the songs in the album would qualify as the first single. However, "She's Out of My Life" was the one that got the warmest reception."

—Nina, explaining on how the first single of the album was chosen.

"Cold Summer Nights" was released in February 2010 as the second promotional single from the album. The song was one of the most-requested out of all the album's tracks. It was originally recorded by Filipino hip-hop legend Francis Magalona. The song was released only to radio after gaining airplay on TV shows from various channels, even before its official release. Like the first single, no music video was shot for "Cold Summer Nights", proving lack of support from Warner. "I'm Yours" was released in May 2010 as the first commercial single from the album. The song was originally recorded by Jason Mraz, and it is the only upbeat single from the album. In April 2010, Warner held a sing-along contest for Nina fans and the winner got the chance to be in the single's music video. However, the single had no promotion, since Nina has departed from Warner to Universal Records during its release. Nina only launched the single on ASAP XV, performing the song during the "ASAP Sessionistas" segment on May 2, 2010. The music video barely featured Nina, and just showed some of her pictures from the Renditions of the Soul album photo shoot. It can be viewed on Warner Music Philippines' official YouTube channel.

== Promotion ==
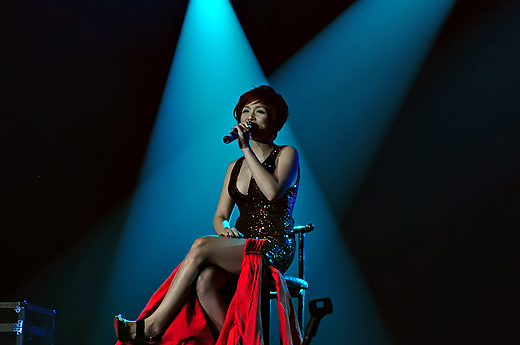
Nina performing "Why Can't It Be" on the ASAP Sessionistas Live in Cebu City in 2009.

Aside from promoting the album on her own radio show of the same title, Nina has performed Renditions of the Soul's songs in her local and international major concerts, bar gigs, mall shows and TV appearances. In addition, the second single "Cold Summer Nights" was used as background music on various TV shows aired by GMA Network and TV5 throughout late 2009 up to early 2010.

On August 28, 2009, Nina performed the fan-favorite and Rannie Raymundo hit "Why Can't It Be" on the ASAP Sessionistas first ever major concert, held at the Araneta Coliseum. On October 11, 2009, she sang the album's lead single, "She's Out of My Life", on ASAP '09, during the "Sessionistas" segment where her album Nina Live! was awarded a 10× Platinum (Diamond) certification for outstanding sales of nearly 300,000 units in the Philippines. She was crying all the way through her performance, explaining that it was because of too much happiness for her achievement. On October 14, 2009, she performed "Go the Distance" on the Greenology mall show at Greenbelt, Makati. On October 23, 2009, she also performed "Why Can't It Be" on the ASAP Sessionistas major concert, live at the Waterfront Cebu City Hotel & Casino. On November 7, 2009, she also performed "She's Out of My Life" on the ASAP Sessionistas first ever U.S. tour. The show was held at the San Jose Civic Auditorium, California. On November 15, 2009, she performed the same song, live at the Queen's College Colden Auditorium, New York, still, as part of the U.S. tour. On January 30, 2010, she performed "Why Can't It Be" during her 19 East bar gig, when the song was requested by the audience on that night. On May 2, 2010, she launched the album's first commercial single, "I'm Yours", on ASAP XV, despite departing from Warner to her new record label Universal at the time of the song's release.

== Awards and accolades ==
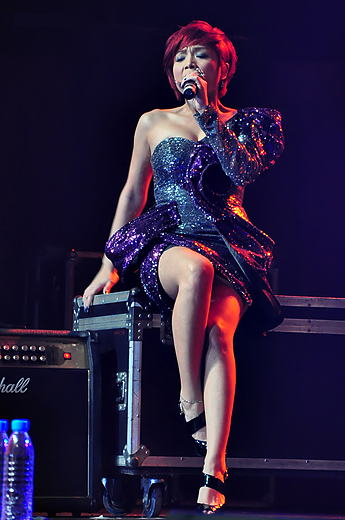
Nina performing on the 2009 ASAP Sessionistas concert in Cebu.

Renditions of the Soul is the most nominated and one of the most awarded albums ever released by Nina. On the 2009 ASAP Pop Viewer's Choice Awards, the album was nominated for Pop Album, and Nina was nominated for Pop Female Artist, but she lost both awards. It won the Best Album category on the first ever Wave 89.1 Urban Music Awards in 2009, where she received four nominations—including Best Female Soul/R&B Artist (which she lost to Amber), Female Style Icon Award (which she lost to Kat of Sinosikat?) and Best Remake for "She's Out of My Life" (which lost to "Spend My Life with You" by Thor and Amber). On the 2010 Guillermo Mendoza Memorial Scholarship Foundation Box-Office Entertainment Awards, she was awarded the Best Female Recording Artist for outstanding sales of her albums in the whole year of 2009. The album also earned her the most (seven) nominations on the second PMPC Star Awards for Music in 2010. She won Female Pop Artist of the Year, but lost the Female Recording Artist of the Year to Sarah Geronimo, Pop Album of the Year to Erik Santos' The Jim Brickman Songbook, Acoustic Album and Female Acoustic Artist of the Year awards to Aiza Seguerra's Live album and Revival Album of the Year to Piolo Pascual's Decades. Kris Aquino's album Blessings of Love, on which she is part of, was also nominated for Compilation Album of the Year. On the 2010 ASAP Pop Viewer's Choice Awards, Renditions of the Soul was nominated for Pop Album, but lost the award to Geronimo's Music and Me. On the second Wave 89.1 Urban Music Awards in 2010, Nina received two nominations including Best Female Soul/R&B Artist and Best Album for Renditions of the Soul. She won Best Album for the second time, and was given a Special Achievement Award for her notable contributions in the OPM industry including the Diamond award she earned with Nina Live!.

Despite earning Nina numerous nominations on different organizations, the album failed to have a nomination on any category of Awit Awards, making 2010 the only year that she was not listed on the Awit Awards in her eight-year career in the music industry.

List of awards and nominations

Year	Award	Category	Result
2009	ASAP Pop Viewer's Choice Awards	Pop Female Artist	Nominated
2009	ASAP Pop Viewer's Choice Awards	Pop Album (Renditions of the Soul)	Nominated
2009	Wave 89.1 Urban Music Awards	Best Female Soul/R&B Artist	Nominated
2009	Wave 89.1 Urban Music Awards	Best Album (Renditions of the Soul)	Won
2009	Wave 89.1 Urban Music Awards	Best Remake ("She's Out of My Life")	Nominated
2010	ASAP Pop Viewer's Choice Awards	Pop Album (Renditions of the Soul)	Nominated
2010	GMMSF Box-Office Entertainment Awards	Female Recording Artist of the Year	Won
2010	PMPC Star Awards for Music	Female Recording Artist of the Year	Nominated
2010	PMPC Star Awards for Music	Pop Album of the Year (Renditions of the Soul)	Nominated
2010	PMPC Star Awards for Music	Female Pop Artist of the Year	Won
2010	PMPC Star Awards for Music	Acoustic Album of the Year (Renditions of the Soul)	Nominated
2010	PMPC Star Awards for Music	Female Acoustic Artist of the Year	Nominated
2010	PMPC Star Awards for Music	Revival Album of the Year (Renditions of the Soul)	Nominated
2010	Wave 89.1 Urban Music Awards	Best Female Soul/R&B Artist	Nominated
2010	Wave 89.1 Urban Music Awards	Best Album (Renditions of the Soul)	Won
2010	Wave 89.1 Urban Music Awards	Special Achievement Award	Won
2011	GMMSF Box-Office Entertainment Awards	Female Recording Artist of the Year	Nominated

== Track listing ==
All tracks were produced by Nina.

No.	Title	Writer(s)	Original artist(s)	Length
1.	"She's Out of My Life" (sung as "He's Out of My Life")	Tom Bahler	Michael Jackson	3:05
2.	"Can't Find the Words to Say Goodbye"	David Gates, Billy Dean	Gates / Dean	3:50
3.	"Cold Summer Nights"	Jimmy Antiporda	Francis Magalona	4:16
4.	"Half Crazy"	Linda Creed, Lonnie Jordan	Johnny Gill	4:15
5.	"Home"	Brian McKnight	McKnight	4:10
6.	"Is There Something"	Christopher Cross, Steve Dorff, Cynthia Weil	Cross	3:49
7.	"Will You Wait for Me"	Anthony "Kavana" Kavanagh, Andrew Watkins, Paul Wilson	Kavana	3:50
8.	"I'm Yours"	Jason Mraz	Mraz	4:32
9.	"One Last Cry"	McKnight, Brandon Barnes, Melanie Barnes	McKnight	4:47
10.	"Why Can't It Be"	Rannie Raymundo	Raymundo	4:07
11.	"Go the Distance"	David Zippel, Alan Menken	Roger Bart	4:33
12.	"7 Days"	Craig David	David	3:47
13.	"Never Again"	McKnight	Justin Timberlake	4:36
14.	"Can You Feel the Love Tonight"	Elton John, Tim Rice	Elton John	4:08
15.	"Here I Am"	Norman Sallitt	Air Supply	4:01
16.	"Real Thing"	Kalapana	Kalapana	5:55
17.	"Lost Without You"	Robin Thicke, Sean Hurley	Thicke	4:23

== Personnel ==
Credits taken from Renditions of the Soul's liner notes.

- Chen Aurelio – pictorial coordinator
- Jim Baluyut – executive producer
- Joseph De Vera – cover layout
- Elaine Ganuelas (for L'Oreal Professionnel) – hair styling
- Nina Girado – executive producer, album producer, lead vocals
- Neil Gregorio – A&R administration, sequencing and mastering
- Jasmine Mendiola (for Glominerals) – make-up
- Daniel Tan – photography
- Joey Valverde – pictorial coordinator
- Vocals and music recorded at Wave 89.1 Studio (Pasig, Philippines)
- Sequenced and mastered at Chili Red Studio

== Charts ==
Chart (2009–2010)	Peak position
Philippine Top Albums	3

== Certifications ==
Country	Provider	Certification	Sales
Philippines	PARI	Platinum	25,000+
