= Araw Mo =

Single by Nina

from the album Nina
- Released: June 2006
- Recorded: 2006
- Genre: Pop
- Length: 2:34
- Label: Warner Music
- Songwriter: Juan Ariel Coma
- Producer: Neil Gregorio

Nina singles chronology
| "I'll Always Love You" (2006) | "Araw Mo" (2006) | "I Do" (2006) |

"Araw Mo" (English: "Your Day") is a birthday song by Filipino singer Nina. It was released by Warner Music Philippines in June 2006. The song was written by Juan Ariel Coma, and produced by Neil Gregorio. It was originally recorded for the promotion of Goldilocks Bakeshop's 40th anniversary. Sales of the single entirely went to charity. Due to high demand and popularity, the song was included in the final track list of her self-titled fourth album as a bonus track. It was, since, considered as a Nina promo single.

"Araw Mo" was well received by music critics, due to the song's distinctive Filipino sound, but was however criticized for its melancholic tone. On March 6, 2007, "Araw Mo" was added to Nina's MP3 Downloads list on Amazon.com and iTunes.

Two sequential music videos were filmed for "Araw Mo", accompanying its physical release. Both videos have only one plot. The first version of the video shows Nina singing to the song, while sitting on a staircase and wearing green-blue blouse and jeans. It tells the story of a boy, who stayed the whole day in his apartment, but nobody even called or came by to greet him a "happy birthday". Later, Nina and his friends were seen coming out of an elevator, greeting him a "happy birthday", with a Goldilocks cake. The second version of the song's music video is a continuation of the first one, where all of the boy's friends are seen partying in his apartment. The song was played throughout 2006 and 2007 in every birthday celebration on ASAP.

== Background ==
After the success of her album, Nina Live!, Nina became an in-demand artist throughout 2005 to 2007. In February 2006, she was chosen to sing the theme song for GMA Films' film of that year, I Will Always Love You. In June 2006, Goldilocks Bakeshop launched a new advertisement for their fortieth anniversary. They chose Nina to be their new endorser, filming a commercial featuring the single.

=== Release ===
"Araw Mo" became very popular in the Philippines, it was dubbed as the official birthday song of the Filipino people. In response to the success of the single, Warner Music decided to include the song in the final track listing of Nina's self-titled fourth album as a bonus track. On March 6, 2007, "Araw Mo" was added to Nina's MP3 Downloads list on Amazon.com and iTunes.

== Critical reception ==
Resty Odon of Titik Pilipino gave the song three out of five stars, saying that "(the single) sounds oddly sad for a birthday song. Good thing it’s likable and not cloying." He found the song just okay, and noted that Nina made it work, when she delivered the song in her soft, mellifluous way, making the birthday song a distinctively Filipino tune. However, he questioned the presence of the song on her self-titled album, stating "What’s this industry practice of throwing in the artist’s TV ad jingles? I don’t get it". Rito Asilo of Inquirer Entertainment described the song as "noteworthy" together with other Nina (the album) songs, including Eric Cabahug's "Is It Over" and Nyoy Volante's "I Need Your Love."

== Music video ==
Nina singing on the music video, while leaning on a wall.

Two sequential music videos were shot for "Araw Mo", accompanying the release of the single. Both videos have only one straightforward storyline and were directed by Stephen Ngo.

=== Synopsis ===
The first version of the video shows Nina singing to the song, while sitting on a staircase and wearing green-blue blouse and jeans. The video tells the story of a boy (who later plays the love interest of Nina), who wakes up in the morning on his birthday. He stays the whole day in his apartment, but nobody even called or came by to greet him a "happy birthday". He started getting bored of being alone, and decided to spend the night hanging out. As soon as he went to the elevator, he found out that his family and friends were all there to greet him as the door of the lift opens. Nina is seen in the middle, happily screaming "happy birthday" to him, while holding a Goldilocks black forest cake.

The second version of the song's music video is a continuation of the first one, where all of the boy's friends are seen partying in his apartment, and he is being sweet to Nina. As parts of the party are shown, Nina sings to the song while leaning on a wall.

== Covers ==
In 2011, Filipino pop balladeer Christian Bautista recorded his own version of the song for Kris Aquino's compilation My Heart's Journey, on which Nina is also part of. It is said to be dedicated by Goldilocks for Aquino's 2011 birthday.

== Formats and track listings ==
Philippine CD single

1. "Araw Mo" (music video)
2. "Araw Mo" (Videoke)
3. "Araw Mo"
4. "Araw Mo" (minus one)
5. "Araw Mo" (Acoustic)
6. "Araw Mo" (Acoustic minus one)
7. "Araw Mo" (Short Greeting)
8. "Araw Mo" (Short Greeting minus one)

Worldwide digital single

1. "Araw Mo"

== Credits and personnel ==
Credits taken from Nina's liner notes.

- Ramil Bahandi – vocal recording
- Juan Ariel Coma – songwriter
- Darwin Concepcion – additional percussion instruments, recording
- Nina Girado – vocals
- Neil Gregorio – producer
- Ferdie Marquez – arranger, mixing
- Noel Mendez – acoustic guitars
- Executive producers: Warner Music, Goldilocks
- Published by Warner Music
- Vocals recorded at Pinknoise Studio
- Mixed at Freq Studio

== Release history ==
| Country | Release date | Format |
|---|---|---|
| Philippines | June 2006 | CD single |
| Worldwide | March 6, 2007 | digital download |
