= I'll Always Love You (Michael Johnson song) =

Single by Michael Johnson

from the album Dialogue
- Released: 1979
- Genre: Soft rock
- Length: 3:45
- Label: EMI
- Songwriters: Eric Kaz, Tom Snow
- Producers: Brent Maher, Steve Gibson

Michael Johnson singles chronology
"This Night Won't Last Forever" (1979)	"I'll Always Love You" (1979)	"Doors" (1979)

"I'll Always Love You" is a song by American singer-songwriter Michael Johnson, released in 1979 as the second single from his fifth album, Dialogue. Despite failing to chart in the Hot 100, the song became a big hit in the Philippines, giving Johnson his only gold record, where it has been covered by several local artists such as Vina Morales, Regine Velasquez, Nina, Bea Alonzo and Martin Nievera.

== Nina version ==
"I'll Always Love You"

Song by Nina

from the album I Will Always Love You Soundtrack and Diamond: Greatest Hits 2002-2010
- Released: February 2006; December 2010 (promo single)
- Recorded: 2006
- Genre: Pop, acoustic
- Length: 3:51
- Label: Warner Music Philippines
- Songwriters: Eric Kaz, Tom Snow
- Producers: Neil Gregorio, Jim Baluyut (executive)

Nina singles chronology
"I Love You Goodbye" (2005)	"I'll Always Love You" (2006)	"Araw Mo" (2006)

"I'll Always Love You" was covered by Filipino pop/R&B singer Nina in February 2006 under Warner Music Philippines. The song was recorded for the promotion of GMA Films' 2006 romantic film I Will Always Love You, starring Richard Gutierrez and Angel Locsin. The film was released on February 8, 2006 as a valentine offer of GMA Films.

In 2010, the song was included on Nina's compilation album, Diamond: Greatest Hits 2002-2010.

=== Music video ===
Nina singing in the music video, while a colorful animated background is seen moving behind her.

The music video for "I'll Always Love You" was directed by Jessel Monteverde. The video had a heavy use of visual special effects, becoming Nina's second music video to be made mostly of animations (the other being "Loving You"). Most of the scenes show animated backgrounds and setting.

The video starts with pictures wherein a photo of Nina walking on the street is slowly zoomed, as the image inside the picture starts moving. She suddenly stops and leans on a wall. A scene where she is singing to the song, while a colorful background is moving behind her, suddenly appears. She is then shown walking on the streets of San Francisco, California, where other people stroll as well (but in a fast-forward motion). The part where she is seen walking fades, and scenes from the film suddenly appears. She is then shown singing the song, while being inserted into the actual scenes of the film.
