= Someday (Nina Girado song) =

Single by Nina

from the album Nina
- Released: November 13, 2006
- Recorded: 2006
- Genre: Pop
- Length: 3:34
- Label: Warner Music Philippines
- Songwriter: Nyoy Volante
- Producer: Neil Gregorio

Nina singles chronology
"I Do" (2006)	"Someday" (2006)	"I Can't Make You Love Me" (2007)

"Someday" is a song by Filipino singer Nina from her 2006 self-titled fourth album. It was released as the album's second commercial single in November 2006 by Warner Music Philippines. The song was written and composed by Nyoy Volante, who was her boyfriend at that time, and it was produced by Warner personnel Neil Gregorio. The song tells a story of a girl who was left by her lover, but still hopes for someone better to come. It was entirely recorded using an acoustic piano, played by Bobby Velasco.

The single was accompanied by two slightly different music videos. The song was performed live on various events and shows including Nina album launch at Bagaberde, ASAP, Myx Live, Asia Uncut and Comedy Bar. The most recent performance of the song was at the Pattaya International Music Festival 2011.

"Someday" was well received by critics and became a commercial success, topping Philippine music charts for eight weeks. It is her third original song to reach number one in the country—the other two being "Jealous" and "Make You Mine". It also became her biggest hit since her 2005 Nina Live! single, "Love Moves in Mysterious Ways", and her seventh number one single all in all. The song was released on digital download through iTunes and Amazon.com.

== Background ==
Early in 2006, the production for Nina (the album) began after the massive success of Nina Live! (2005). Nina, for the first time, worked with Warner's new label executive Jimmy Baluyut, who replaced Ricky Ilacad—whom she has worked with for more than five years, since the start of her career. International songwriters were hired, and Nina's boyfriend at that time, Volante, volunteered to work on the album. He wrote two songs, namely "Someday" and "I Need Your Love". "Someday" was originally meant for one of Volante's albums. He expressed his reason after he recorded his own version of the song in 2010.

"We weren’t thinking of anything, not even about Nina, when we did my version. MCA just thought it’s a nice song and they liked how my version turned out. I did not push for it to become the album’s single [...] I actually wrote "Someday" for one of my albums before I gave it to her [Nina]. From the start, the song was really supposed to be mine. That's why there's wonderment how I could’ve written such a song [because we were exclusively dating at that time]."

== Composition ==
"Someday"
A sample from the song's first chorus, featuring simple, straightforward vocal delivery and plain music, that uses the melody of an acoustic piano.

"Someday" is a slow tempo acoustic ballad, that contains elements of pop and contemporary R&B. It is constructed on a format based on the what's so-called "Filipino love song syndrome". Nina's vocal input on the song is described as "a simple, toned-down, near whispery volume evoking a hotel lounge-level of intimacy". She recorded the song using plain lead vocals, with nothing in the background. The same with the music, where the entire song was recorded using an acoustic piano as the only instrument, with no additional percussion or drums. The song is set in the signature common time, and is written in the key of G♭. It features a basic chord progression of B–B♭m–E♭. The music was handed by Bobby Velasco. The song talks about a lover who is left behind, but remains optimistic that a new one will come along.

== Critical reception ==
"Someday" is considered to be the reason why Nina (the album) managed to reach Platinum by the Philippine Association of the Record Industry. It also won Nina numerous awards from different organizations. Rito Asilo of Inquirer Entertainment praised the song in a review, saying "The introspective, traffic-stopping 'Someday', that boasts of a rich melody and Nina’s emotive panache". Mike Luis of Freestyle described the song as outstanding. He further stated that it's "one [song he]'d keep on [his] playlist". Music publicist Oliver Oliveros gave a review of the song on the November–December 2006 issue of MYX Mag, where he praised "Someday" and stressed how well the Soul Siren's versatility and soothing vocals work.

On the 2007 Awit Awards, Ainuel Kalingking had eight nominations on which three were for "Someday"—Song of the Year, Best Ballad and People's Choice Song of the Year. The song won the People's Choice award, but lost Song of the Year to Kamikazee's "Narda" and Best Ballad to Gary Valenciano's "In Another Lifetime". On the Myx Music Awards 2007, Nina had three nominations on which one was for "Someday". However she lost that Favorite Mellow award to "Invincible" by labelmate Christian Bautista.

Awards and nominations

- 2007 ASAP Pop Viewer's Choice Award for Pop Female Performance – nominated
- 2007 Awit Award for Song of the Year – nominated
- 2007 Awit Award for Best Ballad – nominated
- 2007 Awit Award for People's Choice Favorite Song of the Year – won
- 2007 MYX Music Award for Favorite Mellow Video – nominated
- 2007 USTv People's Choice Award for Students' Choice of Music Video – won

== Music videos ==
A scene from the music video, where Nina is seen sitting on a dining table.

"Someday" was recorded with two slightly different music videos, and both were directed by Treb Montreras II, who also directed the music video for her previous single "I Do".

=== Synopsis ===
The first version of the music video of the song does not feature Nina at all. It only shows different scenes of teenage girls crying and reminiscing, while singing to the song and lip syncing Nina's vocals. The scenes were shown in a random sequence.

The second version of the music video also features the teenage girls, but shows scenes that were shot with Nina in most scenes. The video starts with Nina sitting on a dining table with coffee on it, and singing to the song. She wears a casual cream-colored jacket. Halfway through the video, Nina is seen sitting inside a bedroom, while singing. She still wears a jacket, but it is now different from the first one, it is black with matching black leather bracelet. She is then shown lying on the bed and singing, until the song ends.

== Live performances ==
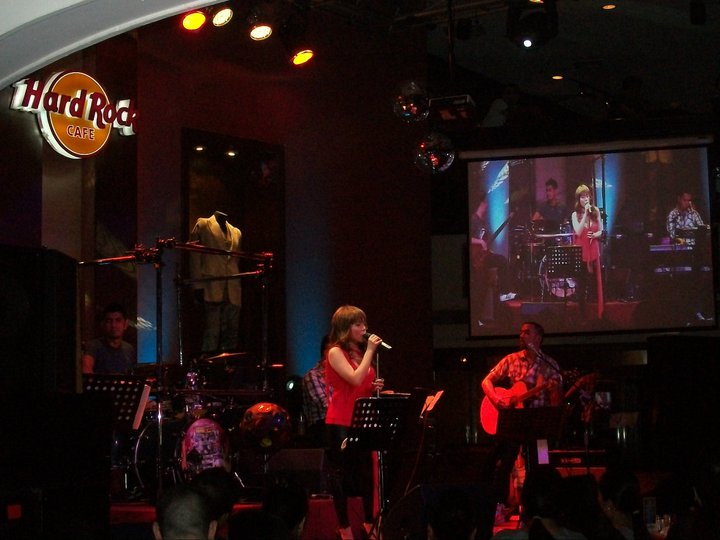
Nina performing "Someday" on her gig at Hard Rock Cafe in 2010.

"Someday" was performed on various television appearances, bar gigs, mall tours, and in almost all of Nina's major concerts throughout 2006 to 2010. On September 8, 2006, she performed the song live during the album launching of Nina (the album) at Bagaberde, Roxas Boulevard. Such notable major concerts that promoted the album include All That Glitters at Bagaberde in August 2006 (which had a repeat in December 2006), Nina at Her Best at the Aliw Theatre (2006), and a major concert at Quezon Convention Center, Lucena City (2007). She also performed the song, as well as few tracks from the album—including "Love Is Contagious", "I Didn't Mean to Make You Mine", and "Ooh Boy"—in a 2007 episode of MYX Live, hosted by Jett Pangan.

On January 4, 2009, during the introduction of the segment "Sessionistas" on musical variety show ASAP (where she has been part of since 2003), she performed "Someday". Also in 2009, she went to Singapore when she was invited to guest on STAR World's Asia Uncut. She sang "Someday", and was later interviewed by Jon Neirmann. The episode aired on May 8, 2009. On the August 14, 2010 episode of GMA-7's Comedy Bar, she performed "Someday" while an over-acting superfan was trying to distract her. She also performed the same song, followed by her 2008 hit single "I Don't Want to Miss a Thing", on the MYX Mo! 2010. On the Pattaya International Music Festival 2011 Galaxy Stage in Pattaya, Thailand, she performed the song together with two of her other previous hits.

== Official versions ==
Version	Length	Album
Album version	3:34	Nina
Band version	3:27	Nina Featuring the Hits of Barry Manilow
Future Confessional Remix	4:52	Nina in the Mix: The Dense Modesto Remixes
Raincloud Remix (Outro)	1:54	Nina in the Mix: The Dense Modesto Remixes

== Credits and personnel ==
Credits taken from Nina's liner notes.

- Nina Girado – vocals
- Neil Gregorio – producer, vocal supervision
- Ferdie Marquez – mixing
- Arnie Mendaros – vocal supervision
- Efren San Pedro – vocal recording
- Bobby Velasco – acoustic piano
- Nyoy Volante – songwriter, composer

== Covers ==
=== Nyoy Volante version ===
In 2010, Nyoy Volante released "Someday" as the first single from his album In You. Despite having a feud with Nina on the estafa case, he came up with reviving the song. In an interview, he stated "We weren’t thinking of anything, not even about Nina, when we did my version. MCA just thought it’s a nice song and they liked how my version turned out. I did not push for it to become the album’s single". He further said that he actually wrote "Someday" for his album before giving it to Nina.

=== Other covers ===
- In 2007, a parody of the song's music video was performed by Julia Montes on Goin' Bulilit, where she altered the word "Someday" with "Sunday" to "Saturday".
- Mongolian Idol Khulan performed the song on the Universe Best Songs Festival 2009.
- In a 2010 episode of Diva, Regine Velasquez sang the song. She eventually covered the same song for her album Reginified (2025), and was also released as a single.
- Japanese singer Yoshika covered the song for her 2010 album, Redwood Tree.
- On December 12, 2010, Star Power contestant Krissel Valdez performed the song live. In the grand finals on February 20, 2011, she performed it again, this time with another contestant K-La Rivera.
- On January 9, 2011, the song was performed live on ASAP Rocks by Sarah Geronimo.
- K-Pop singer Jessica Jung former member of Girls' Generation and Krystal Jung of f(x) covered the song in January, 2013, on Girls' Generation's Romantic Fantasy
- In 2014, Angeline Quinto covered the song for the soundtrack of Sana Bukas pa ang Kahapon.
- In 2018, Leanne and Naara covered their own version of the song.
- Used from Anthonny's elimination from Korean Reality Show Boys Planet.
