= Taja Sevelle =

American singer (born 1962)

- Born: Nancy Richardson; January 7, 1962 (age 64); Minnesota, U.S.
- Genres: R&B; pop
- Occupations: Singer; songwriter
- Years active: 1984–present
- Labels: Paisley Park; Reprise; 550 Music; Epic; Basement Boys; Dauman Music; Matrix Music
- Website: tajasevelle.com

Taja Sevelle (born Nancy Richardson January 7, 1962) is an American singer, best known for her 1987 single, "Love Is Contagious", and for the non-profit organization Urban Farming, which she founded in 2005.

== Biography ==
Sevelle was first featured on Prince and the Revolution's 1985 album Around the World in a Day, singing backing vocals on the song "The Ladder". She subsequently signed a recording contract with Prince's Paisley Park Records in 1987. She also released her self-titled debut album that year, and would go on to release two more studio albums on other labels, 1991's Fountains Free and 1997's Toys Of Vanity, collaborating with the likes of Burt Bacharach, Thom Bell and Nile Rodgers.

=== Debut album ===
The eponymous album Taja Sevelle was produced by Minneapolis musician Chico Bennett. Two of the songs she recorded were written or co-written by Prince: "Wouldn't You Love To Love Me?" and "If I Could Get Your Attention". It failed to chart in the US, but reached number 48 in the UK and number 52 in the Netherlands.

=== Urban Farming ===
In 2005, Taja founded the non-profit organization Urban Farming. Its mission is "to create an abundance of food for people in need by supporting and encouraging the establishment of gardens on unused land and space while increasing diversity, raising awareness for health and wellness, and inspiring and educating youth, adults and seniors to create an economically sustainable system to uplift communities around the globe."

The organization began by planting three gardens of free food in Detroit and there are now more than 63,400 gardens in 61 countries around the world that are a part of the Urban Farming Global Food Chain.

== Discography ==
=== Albums ===
==== Studio albums ====
Year	Album	Peak chart positions	
Year	Album	NLD	UK
1987	Taja Sevelle	52	48
1991	Fountains Free	—	—
1997	Toys of Vanity	—	—
"—" denotes album that did not chart.

==== Extended plays ====
Year	EP
2004	Good Times EP

=== Singles ===
Year	Song	Peak chart positions				
Year	Song	US	US R&B	NLD 40	NLD 100	UK
1987	"Love is Contagious"	62	58	8	20	7
1988	"Wouldn't You Love to Love Me?"	—	61	—	78	59
1988	"Popular"	—	—	—	—	—
1988	"Take Me for a Ride"	—	—	—	—	—
1991	"Trouble Having You Near"	—	—	—	—	—
1998	"A Lot Like You"	—	—	—	—	—
1998	"I & I"	—	—	—	—	—
2000	"Never Givin' Up"	—	—	—	—	—
2003	"Sympathy for the Devil"	—	—	—	—	—
2014	"Little Diva"	—	—	—	—	—
"—" denotes single that did not chart or was not released.

=== Music videos ===
Song	Ref
"Love Is Contagious"	
"Wouldn't You Love to Love Me?"
"Popular"
"Trouble Having You Near"
"I & I"
