= Asia Uncut =

2009 Chinese TV show

- Created by: Jon Niermann
- Presented by: Jon Niermann
- Country of origin: China
- No. of seasons: 2

Production
- Production location: Shanghai
- Running time: 60 minutes (with commercials)

Original release
- Network: STAR World
- Release: 2009 – 2011

Asia Uncut was a variety chat show hosted by Jon Niermann, the president of Electronic Arts, Asia. The show premiered in March 2009 and was aired in many countries via STAR World.
