= All Star Christmas Collection =

Compilation album by Various Artists
- Released: December 25, 2004
- Recorded: 2004
- Genres: Pop, Acoustic, Rock
- Label: Warner Music Philippines

All Star Christmas Collection is a compilation album released by Warner Music Philippines on December 25, 2004. It is composed of 11 tracks and performed by Filipino singers under Warner Music Philippines such as Nina, Artstrong, Paolo Santos, Kitchie Nadal, Pido, Christian Bautista, Thor, Dice & K9, Mike Luis, Side A Band and Joyce.

== Track listing ==
1. "The Christmas Song" – Nina
2. "I Saw Mommy Kissing Santa Claus" - Artstrong
3. "The Man Who Could Be Santa" – Paolo Santos
4. "Merry Christmas Darling" – Kitchie Nadal
5. "On Christmas Morning" - Pido
6. "Silent Night" – Christian Bautista
7. "This Christmas" – Thor
8. "Last Christmas" – Dice & K9
9. "Sleigh Ride" – Mike Luis
10. "I'll Be Home For Christmas" – Side A Band
11. "Have Yourself A Merry Little Christmas" - Joyce
