= Goldilocks Bakeshop =

Bakery chain in the Philippines

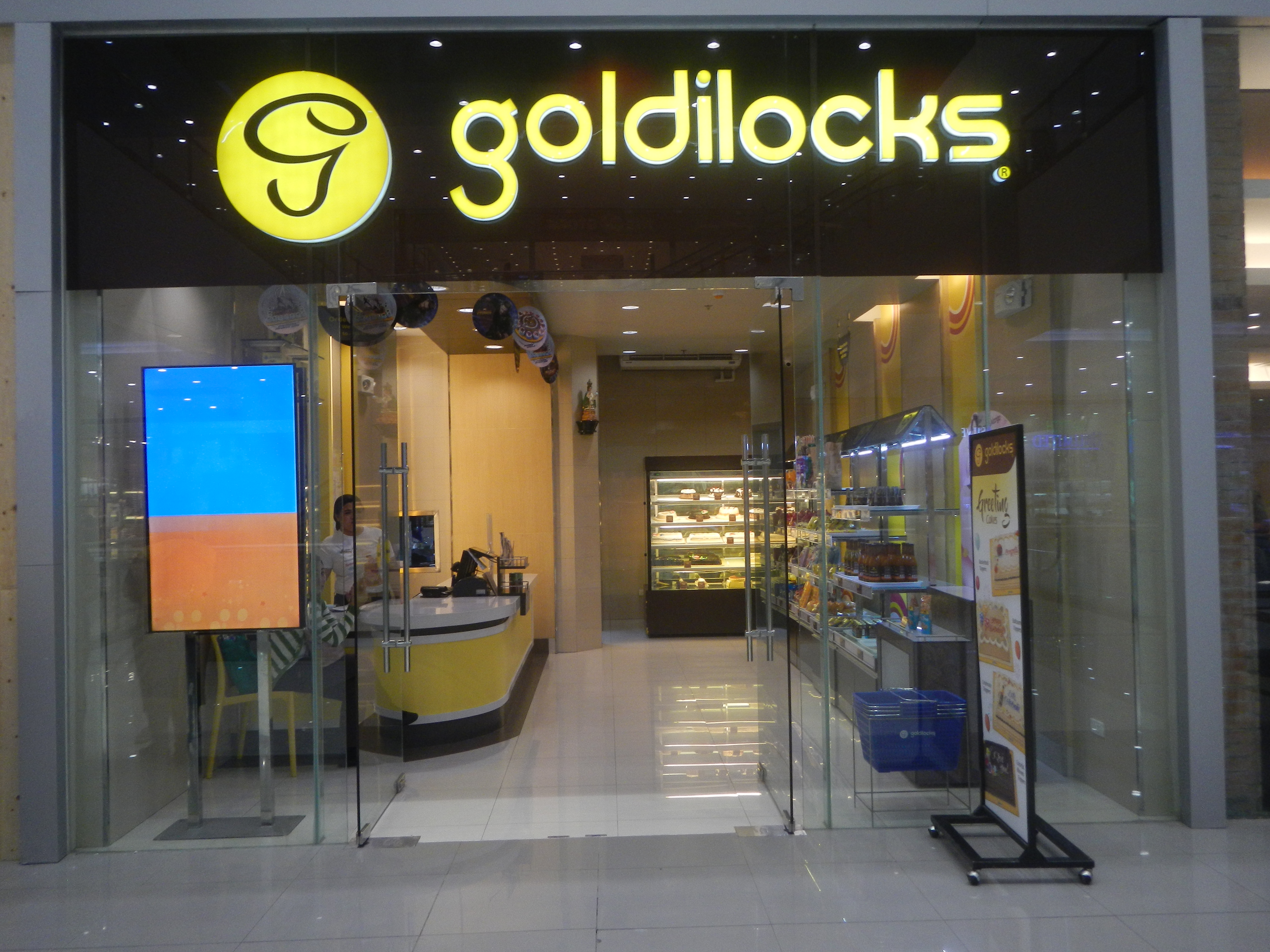
- Goldilocks Bakeshop in SM City Cabanatuan
- Type: Private (1966–2021); Subsidiary (since 2021)
- Founded: May 15, 1966; 60 years ago in Makati, Metro Manila, Philippines
- Founders: Milagros Leelin Yee; Clarita Leelin Go; Doris Wilson Leelin
- Headquarters: Shaw Boulevard, Mandaluyong, Metro Manila, Philippines
- Number of locations: 418 (2015)
- Area served: Philippines
- Key people: Richard L. Yee (President)
- Products: Fast food, bakery
- Number of employees: 2000 (2013)
- Parent: SM Investments Corporation (74%)
- Website: www.goldilocks.com.ph

Goldilocks Bakeshop is a bakery chain based in the Philippines, which produces and distributes Philippine cakes and pastries.

== History ==
On May 15, 1966, Chinese-Filipino sisters, Milagros Leelin Yee and Clarita Leelin Go, with their sister-in-law Doris Wilson Leelin, opened the first Goldilocks store. It occupied a 70-square-meter (750 sq ft) space on the ground floor of a three-storey building along Pasong Tamo Street in Makati, and they started with only ten employees.

In 1976, Goldilocks opened its first store in the United States in Los Angeles. It spread its overseas footprint in other parts of California such as San Francisco, San Jose, and in Las Vegas, Nevada.

In 1991, Goldilocks launched a franchising program which led to the opening of hundreds of Goldilocks' branches across the Philippines.

Pancake House International planned to acquire Goldilocks Bakeshop, but negotiations ended in 2006. Pancake House had offered to acquire Goldilocks for ₱2 billion.

In 2018, SM Investments acquired a 34% stake in Goldilocks Bakeshop, months after its full acquisition deal fell through. It later made Goldilocks a subsidiary by acquiring the chain's majority stake in 2021. In 2024, Goldilocks announced plans to launch 60 more stores to finish the year with 986 branches.

== Branch locations ==
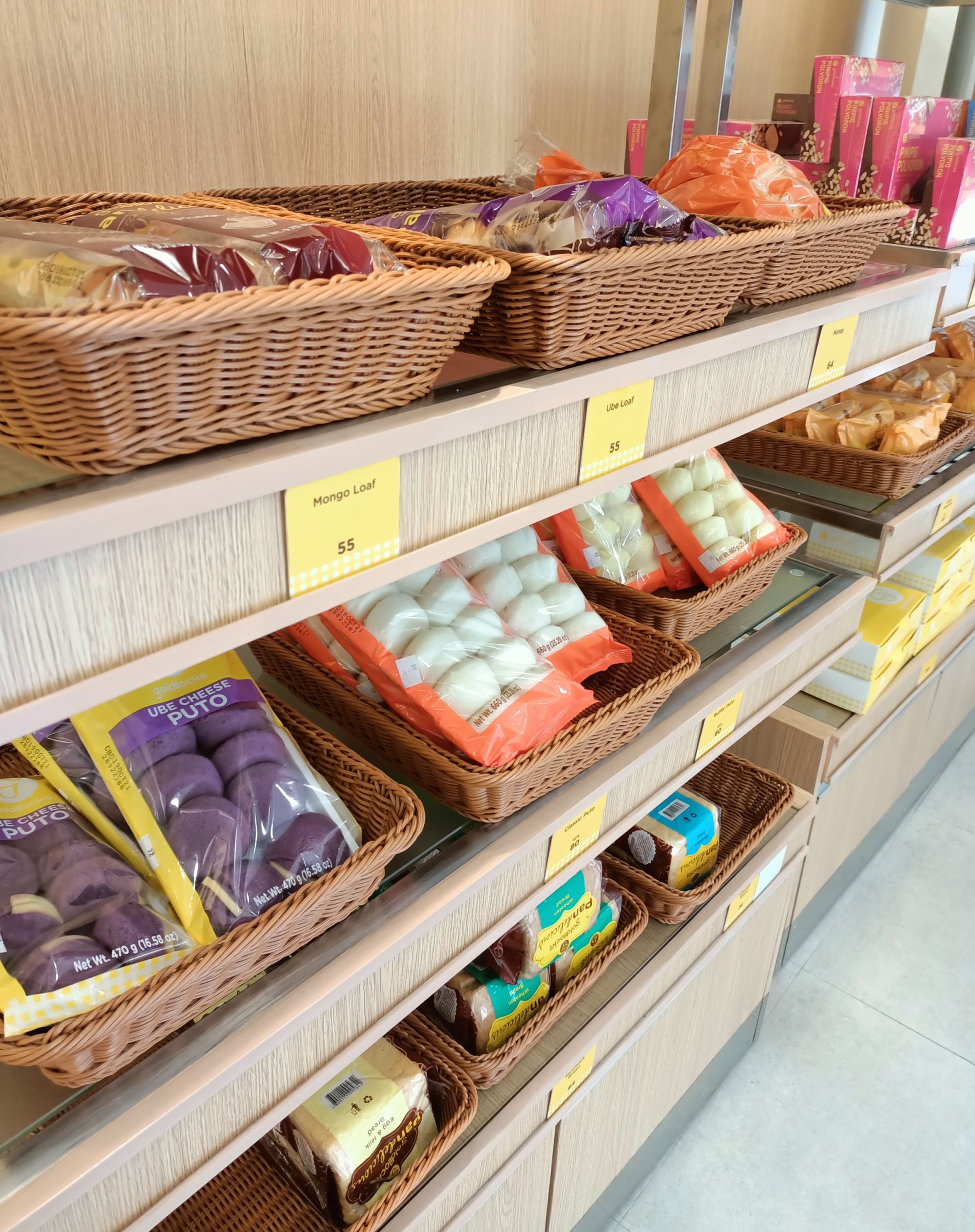
Filipino and foreign pastries on display at a Goldilocks outlet

In 2019, it was reported that there are at least 900 full-service stores in the Philippines, 6 in Thailand, 10 in California and 1 in Nevada, United States, and 2 in Canada.

== Brand image ==
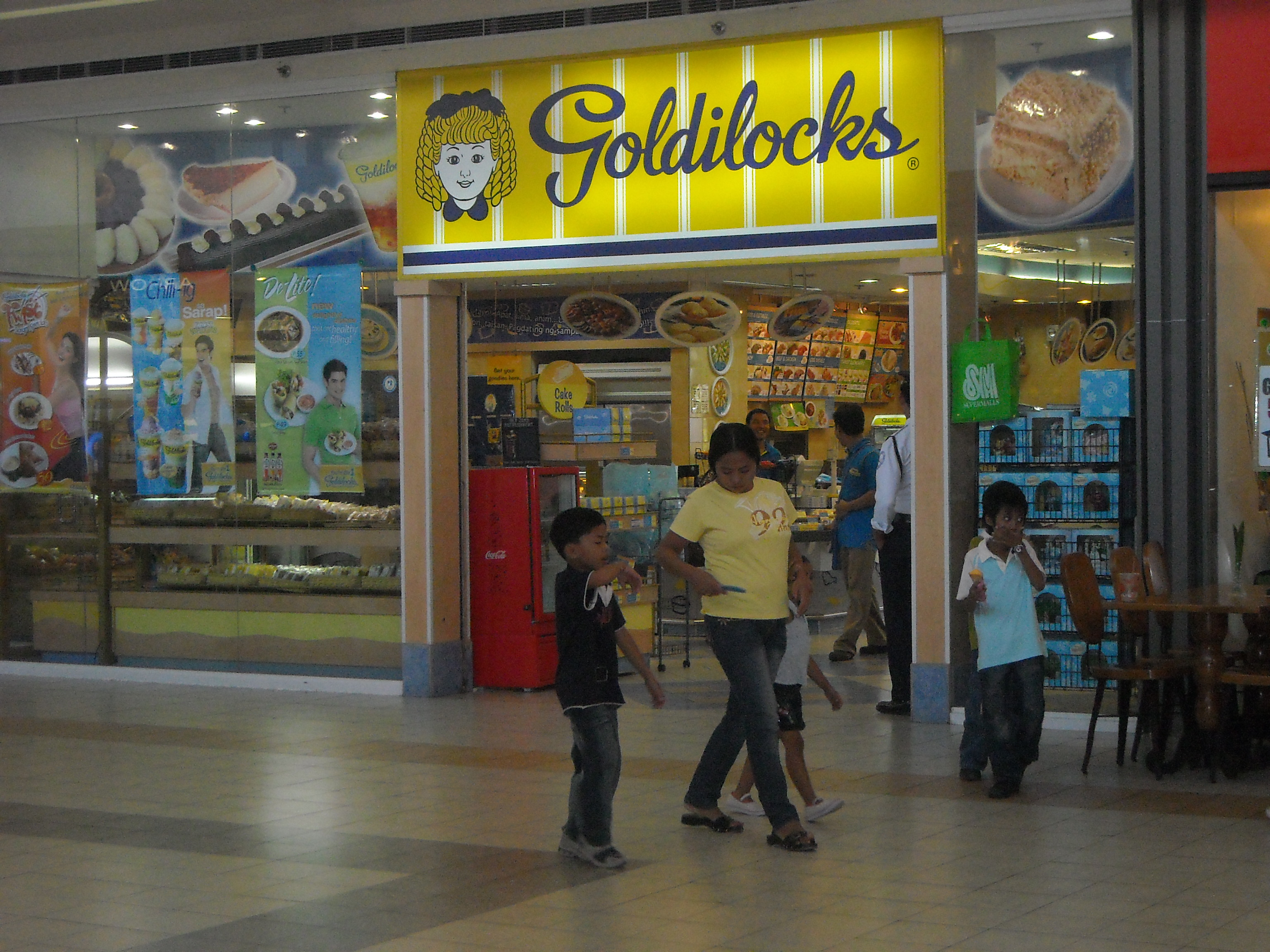
A Goldilocks Bakeshop storefront, featuring the older logotype and mascot, 2009

The chain’s name comes from the 19th-century British fairy tale Goldilocks and the Three Bears. It was chosen for its easier name recall by children and their mothers, while also suggesting the words "gold" and "luck" – considered auspicious by the founders. The naming was suggested by the founders' sister, Maria Flor.

In 2010, Goldilocks underwent a full re-branding.

== See also ==
- List of bakeries
