= I Will Always Love You (film) =

- Official movie poster
- Directed by: Mac C. Alejandre
- Screenplay by: Roselle Monteverde-Teo; Robert Joseph Nuevas; Suzette Doctolero
- Story by: Robert Joseph Nuevas; Suzette Doctolero
- Produced by: Jose Mari Abacan; Roselle Monteverde; Annette Gozon-Abrogar; Lily Y. Monteverde
- Starring: Richard Gutierrez; Angel Locsin
- Cinematography: Rolly Manuel; Lee Meily
- Edited by: Kelly Cruz
- Music by: Jesse Lucas
- Production companies: Regal Films; GMA Films
- Distributed by: GMA Films
- Release date: February 8, 2006
- Running time: 117 minutes
- Country: Philippines
- Language: Filipino
- Box office: ₱60−62 million

I Will Always Love You is a 2006 Philippine romantic comedy drama film directed by Mac C. Alejandre. The film stars Richard Gutierrez and Angel Locsin. The theme song of the film, "I'll Always Love You", is performed by Nina.

== Plot ==
Justin (Richard Gutierrez) is a rich, smart, confident mestizo from a private school in Manila while Cecille (Angel Locsin) is a simple scholar from a rural public school. The two fall for each other against the wishes of his parents, (Jean Garcia and Lloyd Samartino). They want him to marry Donna (Bianca King), their business partner’s daughter.

His parents order Justin to study in the States to separate him from Cecille. But Justin finds a way to take her with him to San Francisco without anyone knowing. The young lovers live their dream in America. One day, however, Justin’s mother drops by to visit, bringing Donna with her. Justin hides Cecille with a family friend (Suzette Ranillo). One day, she catches him and Donna in a tight embrace.

She takes the first plane back to Manila, ignoring Justin’s attempts to explain why he was kissing Donna. Back home, Cecille’s childhood friend Andrew, (James Blanco) courts her relentlessly. In a few months, Andrew and Cecille are engaged to be married. And then, Justin flies home to try to win Cecille back.

== Cast ==
- Richard Gutierrez as Justin Ledesma
- Angel Locsin as Cecille
- James Blanco as Andrew
- Bianca King as Donna
- Tuesday Vargas as Frida
- Bearwin Meily as Ogie
- Jean Garcia as Adelle Ledesma
- Lloyd Samartino as Edward Ledesma
- Amy Austria as Encar
- Melissa Aguirre as Cindy
- Louie Alejandro as Peping
- Malou Crisologo as Grace
- Soliman Cruz as Roger
- Karen delos Reyes as Tessa
- Ehra Madrigal as Mitch
- Miriam Pantig as Mrs. Rivera
- Suzette Ranillo as Tita Emma
- Miguel Tanfelix as Jonjon
- Theo Trapalis as Student (USA)
- Nash Aguas as young Justin
- Gabriel Roxas as young Ogie
- Miguel Aguila
