= I Do (Nina Girado song) =

Single by Nina

from the album Nina
- Released: August 2006
- Recorded: 2006
- Genre: Pop, R&B
- Length: 4:43
- Label: Warner Music
- Songwriters: Joleen Belle; Michael Jay; Carsten Lindberg Hansen; Joachim Svare
- Producer: Neil Gregorio

Nina singles chronology
"Araw Mo" (2006)	"I Do" (2006)	"Someday" (2006)

"I Do" is a song by Filipino singer Nina from her self-titled third studio album, Nina. It was released as the lead single of the album in August 2006 by Warner Music Philippines. The song was written by Joleen Belle, Michael Jay, Carsten Lindberg Hansen and Joachim Svare, and it was produced by Warner personnel Neil Gregorio. It is one of her few original singles. It is also her first upbeat pop-R&B-dance single, since her 2003 number one hit "Make You Mine". The song is described to be Mariah Carey-like, due to Nina's evident use of whistle register and upper-pitch trajectories in the last part of the song.

The song was panned by Original Pilipino Music (OPM) critics, although the album received critical acclaim from the same reviewers. Most reactions mentioned the unoriginality, describing how Nina almost completely sounded like Carey, with all the whistling vocal calisthenics. Same response was given to "Ooh Boy", which has the same uptempo arrangement to "I Do". The song was not as commercially successful as other Nina singles. It was released on digital download through iTunes and Amazon.com.

"I Do" was accompanied by a music video, directed by Treb Montreras II. The video features dance moves and non-basic choreography, making it the first Nina music video to feature such dance moves. The video is almost plotless. Throughout the video, Nina is seen coming out of a door wearing a violet dress. She dances to the chorus of the song, wearing red hooded jacket and jeans, and white sleeveless shirt and short black skirt with bling-blings, with back-up girls dancing behind her. By the end, Nina exits on the red door, where she entered in the beginning of the video.

== Background ==
After the overflowing success of her certified Diamond cover album, Nina Live!, Nina felt that she has made it in the music industry by showcasing her own style of music, and wanted to release a completely different record, an all-original studio album. In an interview with Manila Bulletin, she stated "After Nina Live! last year, people were expecting another all-remakes album. We didn’t go that way because we didn’t feel it’s right to give them two in a row. Besides, I don’t want to be typecast as a covers artist". No other female OPM artist could match her all-around mastery of pop, R&B. jazz and soul. While others limit themselves to just R&B, ballads, acoustic tributes or the occasional remake, Nina has done much, much more and she wanted to show it in the album. During the release of the song, fans translated the song's title "I do" as her sweet answer to Nyoy Volante, her boyfriend at that time, but Nina declined in the following statement:

"I am just so happy saying 'I do' to life, to work, and I thank God for all the wonderful blessings He gives me each day".

== Composition ==
"I Do"
The song has an uptempo arrangement, reminiscent to "Make You Mine", and is heavily influenced by American pop and Contemporary R&B music.

"I Do" is an uptempo dance anthem that contains elements of pop and Contemporary R&B, and is heavily influenced by the sound of American R&B-hip hop music, reminiscent to Nina's number one hit, "Make You Mine". It was written by international songwriters Joleen Belle, Michael Jay, Carsten Lindberg Hansen and Joachim Svare. The song was produced by Neil Gregorio. It is described to be too Mariah-ish, due to Nina's evident use of whistle register in the last chorus of the song. It is also the only song on Nina (the album) to feature her upper-pitch trajectories and whistle register, since other songs in the album were "sung in a soft, near-whispery volume evoking a hotel lounge-level of intimacy".

== Critical reception ==
Aside from being less successful than the previous Nina singles, "I Do" has received negative reviews (most critics pointing out the song's Mariah Carey-like sound). Music publicist Oliver Oliveros gave a review of the song on the November–December 2006 issue of MYX Mag, stating "The Soul Siren's versatile and soothing vocals work well in this album [Nina]. But on the first two tracks, 'I Do' and 'Ooh Boy' Nina sounds like Mariah Carey, complete with whistling vocal calisthenics".

Despite the harsh critical response, "I Do" has given Nina nominations on two different major award-giving bodies—on which it won both awards. On the 2007 Awit Awards, the song won for Best Engineered Recording category, while on the Myx Music Awards 2007, it won the Favorite Urban Video category.

== Music video ==
A scene from the music video, where Nina is seen dancing with back-up dancers.

The music video for "I Do" was directed by Treb Montreras II. The video features dance moves and non-basic choreography, making it the first Nina music video to feature such dance moves. The video is almost plotless. Its setting is a club, where there are bright lights and big letters that spell "NINA".

=== Synopsis ===
In the first scene, Nina enters a red door wearing a violet dress and started singing to the song. She is then shown wearing a red hooded jacket and jeans. At the chorus, she starts dancing with back-up dancers behind her, while wearing a white sleeveless shirt, a short black skirt, and long necklaces. She is then seen dancing with the same back-up dancers, but only, she is now wearing the red hooded jacket again. Halfway through the video, a man in a black outfit (her love interest in the video) is seen freeing a green bird. The video ends with Nina exiting the red door, where she entered in the beginning of the video.

== Live performances ==
On September 8, 2006, Nina (the album) was launched at Bagaberde, Roxas Boulevard, where Nina performed the song. In the same month, she launched the album on ASAP '06, performing the first single, "I Do". Such notable major concerts that promoted the album include All That Glitters at Bagaberde in August 2006 (which had a repeat in December 2006), Nina at Her Best at the Aliw Theatre (2006), and a major concert at Quezon Convention Center, Lucena City (2007). She also performed the song with her own band on a 2007 episode of MYX Live, hosted by Jett Pangan, as well as a few tracks—including "Love Is Contagious", "I Didn't Mean to Make You Mine", and "Ooh Boy". She has also sung the song on her major concerts, bar gigs, mall tours and TV appearances throughout 2006 and 2007. The most recent live performance of the song was at the Pattaya International Music Festival 2011 Galaxy Stage in Pattaya, Thailand on March 18, 2011. She represented the Philippines in the music event and performed "I Do" in between her other hits, "Someday" and "I Don't Want to Miss a Thing".

== Official versions ==
Version	Length	Album
Album version	4:43	Nina
VP Stomp Remix	4:10	Nina in the Mix: The Dense Modesto Remixes

== Credits and personnel ==
Credits taken from Nina's liner notes.

- Joleen Belle – songwriter
- Nina Girado – vocals, back-up vocals
- Neil Gregorio – producer, vocal supervision
- Carsten Lindberg Hansen – songwriter
- Michael Jay – songwriter
- Ferdie Marquez – sequencing and programming, mixing
- Arnie Mendaros – vocal supervision
- Noel Mendez – guitars
- Efren San Pedro – vocal recording
- Joachim Svare – songwriter
