= Myx Music Awards 2007 =

Annual Philippine music awards ceremony

- Date: March 15, 2007
- Location: AFP Theater

Television/radio coverage
- Network: MYX

The 2nd Myx Music Awards was held on March 15, 2007, at the AFP Theater.

== List of nominees and winners ==
Winners are in bold text

=== Favorite Music Video ===
- "Martyr Nyebera" by Kamikazee
- **"Bitiw" by Sponge Cola**
- "Sugod" by Sandwich
- "Invincible" by Christian Bautista
- "Doo Bidoo" by Kamikazee

=== Favorite Song ===
- "Narda" by Kamikazee
- **"Bitiw" by Sponge Cola**
- "Sugod" by Sandwich
- "Doo Bidoo" by Kamikazee
- "Stars" by Callalily

=== Favorite Artist ===
- Rachelle Ann Go
- Christian Bautista
- **Sponge Cola**
- Erik Santos
- Sarah Geronimo

=== Favorite Male Artist ===
- **Christian Bautista**
- Erik Santos
- Gary Valenciano
- Michael V.
- Sam Milby

=== Favorite Female Artist ===
- Sarah Geronimo
- **Rachelle Ann Go**
- Nina
- Sitti
- Toni Gonzaga

=== Favorite Group ===
- Kamikazee
- **Sponge Cola**
- Sandwich
- Hale
- 6cyclemind

=== Favorite Collaboration ===
- **"Bakit Ba Iniibig Ka" by Erik Santos and Regine Velasquez**
- "The Ordertaker" by Parokya ni Edgar and Kamikazee
- "Hindi Ko Na Kayang Masaktan Pa" by Ogie Alcasid and Regine Velasquez
- "Superproxy 2k6" by Francis M. and Ely Buendia
- "Umaasa" by 6Cyclemind and Francis M.

=== Favorite Remake ===
- "Doo Bidoo" by Kamikazee
- "Nakapagtataka" by Sponge Cola
- **"Your Love" by Erik Santos**
- "Panalangin" by Moonstar88
- "Yakap Sa Dilim" by Orange & Lemons

=== Favorite Rock Video ===
- "Bitiw" by Sponge Cola
- "Sugod" by Sandwich
- **"Doo Bidoo" by Kamikazee**
- "Waltz" by Hale
- "Pintura" by Kjwan

=== Favorite Mellow Video ===
- "I Still Believe in Loving You" by Sarah Geronimo
- "Dahil Ikaw" by True Faith
- **"Invincible" by Christian Bautista**
- "Someday" by Nina
- "You Give Me Reason" by Gary V.

=== Favorite Urban Video ===
- "I Do" by Nina
- "Solid" by Pikaso
- **"Manila" by Amber**
- "Igalaw Mo Lang" by Dcoy & RP
- "6 in the Morning" by Dice & K9 Mobbstarr

=== Favorite Indie Artist ===
- **Kjwan**
- Queso
- Up Dharma Down
- Dong Abay
- Mayonnaise

=== Favorite New Artist ===
- Callalily
- **Kala**
- Hilera
- Toni Gonzaga
- Yeng COnstantino

=== Favorite MYX Live Performance ===
- Apo Hiking Society
- **Christian Bautista**
- Kjwan
- Slapshock
- Dong Abay

=== Favorite International Music Video ===
- "Buttons" by The Pussycat Dolls
- **"Welcome To The Black Parade" by My Chemical Romance**
- "Bebot" by The Black Eyed Peas
- "Breaking Free" by Nikki Gil, Vince Chong and Alicia Pan
- "SexyBack" by Justin Timberlake

=== Favorite Media Soundtrack ===
- **"Dahil Ikaw" by True Faith for Sa Piling Mo**
- "Isang Bandila" by Rivermaya for Bandila
- "Nakakabaliw" by Barbie Almalbis and Pupil for Juicy Fruit Rockoustic Mania
- "First Day High" by Kamikazee for Rexona, First Day High
- "Super Noypi" by Sandwich for Super Noypi

=== Favorite Guest Appearance in a Music Video ===
- Rica Peralejo for "Martyr Nyebera" by Kamikazee
- Piolo Pascual for "We Belong" by Toni Gonzaga
- Gretchen Barretto for "Minamahal Kita" by Ogie Alcasid
- Edu Manzano for "DVDX" by Sandwich
- **Chin-Chin Gutierrez for "Pintura" by Kjwan**

=== Favorite MYX Celebrity VJ ===
- **Michael V.**
- Gary V.
- Jojo A.
- Maverick & Ariel
- Kamikazee

=== Favorite Ringtone ===
- "Narda" by Kamikazee

=== MYX Magna Award ===
- Apo Hiking Society
