= Love Is Contagious =

Single by Taja Sevelle

from the album Taja Sevelle
- B-side: "Mama 16"
- Released: 1987
- Genre: Pop; R&B
- Length: 4:35
- Label: Paisley Park
- Songwriter: Taja Sevelle
- Producer: Chico Bennett

Taja Sevelle singles chronology
"Love Is Contagious" (1987)	"Wouldn't You Love to Love Me?" (1987)

"Love Is Contagious" is the debut single by American singer Taja Sevelle, released in 1987. The song was taken from her eponymous debut studio album, released by Paisley Park Records. It is Sevelle's only major chart hit, reaching No. 7 on the UK singles chart in early 1988.

== Track listing ==
7" single

1. "Love Is Contagious (Edit)"
2. "Mama 16 (Edit)"

12" single

1. "Love Is Contagious (Extended Mix)"
2. "Mama 16 (Edit)"
3. "Love Is Contagious (Instrumental Dub)"

== Chart positions ==
Chart (1987–1988)	Peak position
Netherlands (Dutch Top 40)	8
Netherlands (Single Top 100)	20
UK Singles (Official Charts Company)	7
US Billboard Hot 100	62
US Hot R&B/Hip-Hop Songs (Billboard)	58
