= Warner Music Philippines =

Philippine record label

- Parent company: Warner Music Group (1977–present)
- Founded: 1977 (as WEA Records Philippines)
- Status: Active
- Distributor: Self-distributed (since 1993)
- Genre: Various
- Country of origin: Philippines
- Location: Unit 501-503, 5th Flr. C2 Bldg. Bonifacio High Street Central, 30th St. 7th Ave. Bonifacio Global City, Taguig City 1634, Philippines
- Official website: Warner Music Philippines on Facebook

Warner Music Philippines (WMP) is a record label in the Philippines. It is a regional branch of the multinational music conglomerate Warner Music Group.

Founded in 1977, the company gained its self-distributed status and has since began releases of several Filipino music artists and bands. The label has been switched to digital-only releases since the 2010s.

== History ==
WMG, then known as WEA International, established WEA Records Philippines under a distribution/license agreement for 15 years with a local group led by Bella Dy Tan.

In 1992, Warner Music officially set up its own local branch, after its distributor gained its own independent status and became Universal Records. Its initial offices were at the Ma. Daniel Building in Malate, Manila.

WMP has been signed artists throughout the 1990s and 2000s, including Lea Salonga, Side A, Alamid, Barbie's Cradle, David Pomeranz, Nina, Kitchie Nadal, Christian Bautista, Sitti, and Kamikazee. In 2003, WMP transferred its offices to the Wynsum Corporate Plaza in Ortigas Center and then to the UnionBank Plaza in the same district.

In the 2010s, amid the widespread of piracy issues, WMP suffered a decline in revenues. Since then, it began transitioned its catalog of releases to digital-only thru global streaming music platforms like Spotify. It also launched its digital site, PressPlay.ph and by that same period, moved its offices to the EcoTower in Bonifacio Global City.

In 2019, WMP signed new artists and bands like Quest, Leanne & Naara, Keiko Necesario and St. Wolf.

In 2020, WMP signed a new partnership with Cagayan de Oro-based 9K Records, a local label featuring artists from southern parts of the Philippines. The same year, WMP also signed an agreement with the PhilPop Fest Foundation and Smart Communications to host the 2020 edition of the annual PhilPop competition.

In 2021, WMG appointed Sarah Ismail as the new Managing Director of WMP. Also in 2021, WMP signed agreement with Sora Music Group, a local EDM label founded by DJ/producer Jenil, as its sublabel.

In October 2021, Warner Music Philippines launched Global Pinoy Music (GLOPM), an initiative movement to expand Filipino music worldwide in collaboration of OPM artists with international-based Filipino artists and producers.

In 2023, Warner Music Philippines celebrates their 30th anniversary, with also the launching of their new collaboration various artist compilation album 30 Years with Warner Music Philippines, a celebration of 3 decades of with features a past songs of WMP and various newbies OPM artists reimagined album like Jason Dhakal, Sugarcane, Lola Amour, Felip, Jika Marie and others. The songs are available on digital downloads on Spotify, iTunes and all digital stores worldwide.

== Associated and affiliated labels ==
- 1st.One Entertainment
- 9K Records
- Music Colony Records
- Northern Root Records
- Rebel Records PH
- Sora Music Group

== Artists ==
=== Current ===
- 1st.One
- AboutRadio
- Aloura
- Arthur Miguel
- Banna Harbera
- Basically Saturday Night
- Boy Graduate
- Ciudad
- Cliff
- Curse One
- Dave Anonuevo
- Daydream
- Dicta License
- Dilaw
- Dione
- Felip
- Hairgum
- Hulyo
- JRLDM
- Jason Dhakal
- Jikamarie
- Keiko Necesario
- Leanne & Naara
- LTNM
- Lola Amour
- Midnasty (Paraisla)
- Mint Magic
- Muri
- Nicole Laurel Asensio
- Noah Alejandre
- Party Pace
- Paul Pablo
- PLAYERTWO (7640 Inc./Paraisla)
- Quest
- Reanne Borela
- Reon
- St. Wolf
- Sud
- Sugarcane
- Tonie Enriquez

Sora Music Group

- Eva Smalls ( (Canada) )
- Ian Sndrz
- Katsy Lee
- LouisVint
- Janny Medina
- Jenil

=== Former ===
- Lea Salonga (1993–1996)
- Side A
- Alamid (1993–2001)
- Zsa Zsa Padilla (1994–1996)
- Barbie's Cradle
- David Pomeranz
- Kamikazee (2002–2005)
- Nina (2002–2010)
- Kitchie Nadal (2003–2007)
- Christian Bautista (2004–2009)
- Pops Fernandez (2004–2006)
- Sitti (2005–2013)
- Rivermaya (2007–2011)
- Moonstar88
- Gracenote
- Paolo Santos
- Mark Carpio
- Cheese (now Queso)
- Rico Blanco (2008–2013)
- Ben&Ben
- Zild Benitez
- Hey June!
- The Speaks
- Hale (2015–2020; returned to EMI Philippines)
- Carousel Casualties
- IV of Spades (2018–2020)
