= Christian Bautista discography =

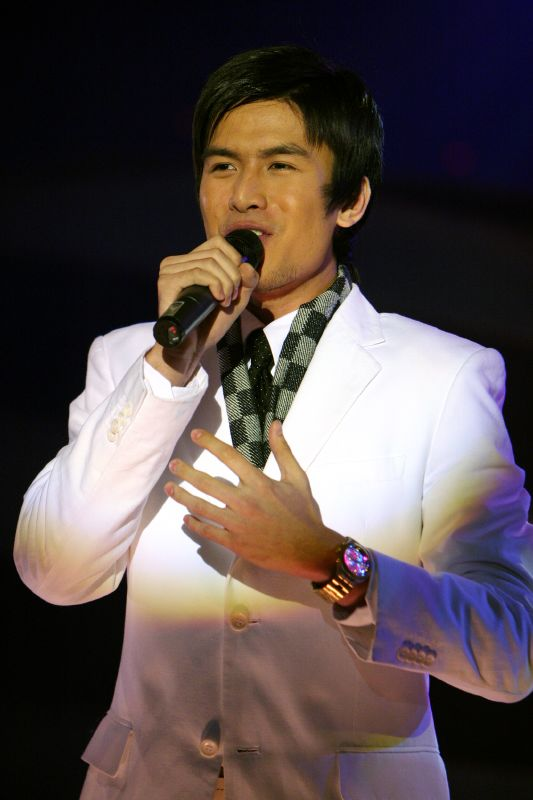
- Studio albums: 8
- Soundtrack albums: 4
- Live albums: 1
- Compilation albums: 2
- Singles: 23
- Video albums: 1

Christian Bautista has released a total of eight studio albums, one live album, two compilation albums and twenty-two solo singles in his entire career. Bautista is the first artist of the 2000s to have his debut album certified multi-platinum in several Southeast Asian countries like the Philippines, Indonesia and Thailand. Furthermore, his second album Completely was certified platinum in other Asian countries. Aside from Nina, he was considered to be the biggest-selling artist of Warner Music Philippines. However, he transferred to Universal Records in 2009, making a covers album composed of songs originally released by Jose Mari Chan. To date, Bautista has sold more than 700,000 albums in Asia.

== Albums ==
=== Studio albums ===
List of albums, with sales and certifications
Title	Album details	Sales (Note: Sales are based on the album certification received alone.)	Certifications
Christian Bautista	Released: September 28, 2004; Label: Warner; Format: Cassette, CD, digital download	PHI: 120,000	PARI: 4× Platinum
Completely	Released: December 22, 2005; Label: Warner; Format: CD, digital download	PHI: 30,000; IND: 75,000	PARI: Platinum; RII: Platinum
Captured	Released: July 20, 2008; Label: Warner; Format: CD, digital download	PHI: 30,000	PARI: Platinum
Romance Revisited: The Love Songs of Jose Mari Chan	Released: August 20, 2009; Label: Universal; Format: CD, digital download	PHI: 80,000; IND: 150,000	PARI: 4× Platinum; RII: 2× Platinum
A Wonderful Christmas	Released: November 23, 2010; Label: Universal; Format: CD, digital download	PHI: 200,000	PARI: Diamond
First Class: Outbound Expanded Edition	Released: 2012; Label: Universal; Format: CD, digital download	PHI: 15,000	PARI: Platinum
Soundtrack	Released: 2014; Label: Universal; Format: CD, digital download	PHI: 15,000	PARI: Platinum
Kapit	Released: 2017; Label: Universal; Format: CD, digital download		

=== Live albums ===
Year	Album details	Certifications
Just a Love Song... Christian Bautista Live!	Released: January 24, 2007; Label: Warner; Format: CD, digital download	PHI: Platinum

=== International albums ===
Year	Album details
Outbound	Released: 2011; Label: Universal; Format: CD, digital download

=== Compilations ===
Year	Album details
Face Off (with Erik Santos)	Released: 2008; Label: Warner, Star; Format: CD, digital download
The Platinum Collection	Released: 2009; Label: Warner; Format: CD, digital download
Love 2 Love (Acoustic Love Songs) (with Nina Girado)	Released: 2012; Label: Warner; Formats: CD
X Plus	Released: 2012; Label: Universal; Formats: CD, digital download

=== Re-issues / re-releases ===
- 2005: Christian Bautista (Limited Edition)
- 2007: Christian Bautista Live! (Special Christmas Edition)
- 2010: Romance Revisited: The Love Songs of Jose Mari Chan (Platinum Edition)

== Singles ==
Title	Year	Album
"The Way You Look at Me"	2004	Christian Bautista
"Hands to Heaven"	2004	Christian Bautista
"Colour Everywhere"	2004	Christian Bautista
"Kailan Pa Ma'y Ikaw"	2004	Christian Bautista
"You and Me (We Wanted It All)" (with Rachelle Ann Go)	2005	Christian Bautista
"Kelan Kaya"	2005	Christian Bautista
"Everything You Do"	2005	Completely
"Invincible"	2006	Completely
"She Could Be"	2006	Completely
"My Heart Has a Mind of Its Own"	2006	Completely
"Got to Believe in Magic"	2006	Just a Love Song... Christian Bautista Live!
"Trying to Get the Feeling Again"	2007	Just a Love Song... Christian Bautista Live!
"Pasko na Sinta Ko"	2007	Just a Love Song... Christian Bautista Live!
"The One Who Won My Heart"	2008	Captured
"Captured" (featuring Sitti)	2008	Captured
"Limutin na Lang"	2009	Captured
"Tell Me Your Name"	2009	Romance Revisited: The Love Songs of Jose Mari Chan
"Beautiful Girl"	2010	Romance Revisited: The Love Songs of Jose Mari Chan
"Please Be Careful with My Heart" (with Sarah Geronimo)	2010	Romance Revisited: The Love Songs of Jose Mari Chan
"Afraid for Love to Fade"	2010	Romance Revisited: The Love Songs of Jose Mari Chan
"I Remember the Girl"	2010	Romance Revisited: The Love Songs of Jose Mari Chan
"Nakaraang Pasko"	2010	A Wonderful Christmas
"Tetaplah Dihatiku" (with Bunga Citra Lestari)	2010	The Best of BCL
"All That's Left"	2011	Outbound
"Beautiful To Me"	2012	First Class: Outbound Expanded Edition
"In Love with You" (with Angeline Quinto)	2012	First Class: Outbound Expanded Edition
"Sasabihin" (with Neocolours)	2012	First Class: Outbound Expanded Edition
"What Can I Do"	2013	First Class: Outbound Expanded Edition
"Up Where We Belong"	2014	Soundtrack
"A Thousand Years"	2015	Soundtrack
"Two Forevers" (with Jessica Sanchez)	2015	TBA
"Who Is She To Me"	2015	TBA
"Kapit"	2017	Kapit

== Soundtracks ==
Song	Year	Film
"So It's You"	2005	Dreamboy
"Nasaan Ka Man"	2005	Nasaan Ka Man
"My Heart Has a Mind of Its Own"	2006	Mano Po 5: Gua Ai Di (I Love You)
"Tamang Daan"	2007	Gulong
"I'm Already King"	2011	A Special Symphony
"Gaano Kadalas ang Minsan"	2012	Walang Hanggan
"Nag-iisang Bituin"	2012	Princess and I
"Nag-iisang Ikaw"	2012	Precious Hearts Romances Presents
"Maghihintay Sayo"	2013	Maghihintay Pa Rin
"Ngiti"	2013	With a Smile
"A Thousand Years"	2015	Empress Ki
"Sayo Lang Ang Aking Puso"	2015	My Mother's Secret
"Aking Mahal"	2019	The Crown Princess
"You Are Everything"	2023	Unbreak My Heart

== Other appearances ==
Year	Song	Album
2003	"Say That You Love Me"	Star in a Million
2003	"Star in a Million" (Theme) (Star in a Million Finalists)	Star in a Million
2004	"You and Me (We Wanted It All)" (Rachelle Ann Go with Christian Bautista)	Rachelle Ann Go (Repackaged)
2004	"You and Me (We Wanted It All)" (Rachelle Ann Go with Christian Bautista)	Return Of The Champions
2004	"Silent Night"	All Star Christmas Collection
2005	"Burn" (Nina feat. Christian Bautista)	Nina Live!
2006	"Dying to Tell You"	Hotsilog: The ASAP Hotdog Compilation
2008	"Unsaid" (Lala with Christian Bautista)	Hearts
2009	"Kaya Natin Ito" (various artists)	Single-only release
2009	"Please Be Careful with My Heart" (Sarah Geronimo with Christian Bautista)	Music and Me
2010	"Sa Ugoy ng Duyan"	Paalam, Maraming Salamat President Cory Aquino
2010	"Wrong Number" (One Way with Christian Bautista)	One Way Street (Philippine Edition)
2011	"Biyahe Tayo" (various artists)	Single-only release
2011	"Love Moves In Mysterious Ways"	Kris Aquino's My Hearts Journey
2012	"Rainy Day" (Baby M with Christian Bautista)	Baby M
2012	"Terrified" (Sabrina with Christian Bautista)	I Love Acoustic 5
2012	"Ikaw Lamang"	The Songwriter & The Hitmakers
