= Christian Bautista videography =

Christian Bautista's videography

== Music videos ==
Year	Title	Album	Director
2003	"The Way You Look At Me"^{1}	Christian Bautista	
2003	"Hands To Heaven"	Christian Bautista	
2003	"Colour Everywhere"^{2}	Christian Bautista	
2003	"Kailan Pa Ma'y Ikaw"	Christian Bautista	
2004	"You & Me (We Wanted It All)"^{3}	Christian Bautista Repackaged Edition	
2005	"So It's You"^{4}	Dreamboy OST	
2005	"Nasaan Ka Man"^{5}	Nasaan Ka Man OST	
2005	"Everything You Do"	Completely	
2005	"Invincible"	Completely	
2005	"Everything You Do"	Completely	
2008	"The One Who Won My Heart"	Captured	
2015	"Who Is She To Me"	Kapit	Leon Mitchell

Footnotes

- ^{1} The video for the song "The Way You Look At Me" is the first music video of Christian Bautista
- ^{2} This song is also used by Dunkin' Donuts for their ad campaign starring Christian Bautista
- ^{3} This song features Rachelle Ann Go.
- ^{4} The song and video are original soundtracks from the Tagalog movie Dreamboy starring Piolo Pascual and Bea Alonzo from Star Cinema.
- ^{5} The song and video are original soundtracks from the Tagalog movie "Nasaan Ka Man" starring Claudine Barreto, Diether Ocampo and Jericho Rosales from Star Cinema.

== Guest appearances ==
Year	Title	Album	Director
2005	"Burn"^{1}	Nina Live!	

Footnotes:

- ^{1} Included in Nina's multi-platinum album Nina Live!. Garnered the Best Collaboration during the 2005 Myx Music Awards.

== Live Album ==
Just A Love Song...Live! is the first live album of Christian Bautista, which was recorded and filmed at Teatrino in Greenhills. The following tracks are included in the audio/video release of the album:

1. "Trying To Get The Feeling Again"
2. "More Than You'll Ever Know"
3. "Only Reminds Me Of You"
4. "Beautiful In My Eyes"
5. "Make It With You"
6. "Got To Believe In Magic"
7. "Fixing A Broken Heart"
8. "Could Not Ask For More"
9. "Of All The Things"
10. "Nothing Can Stop Us Now"
11. "Be My Number Two"
12. "Finding Out The Hard Way"
13. "Blue Eyes Blue"
14. "Cry For Help"
15. "Heaven Help"
16. "I Won't Hold You Back"
17. "If Ever You're In My Arms Again"
18. "You"
19. "Just A Love Song"
