= 4th PMPC Star Awards for Music =

- Date: September 9, 2012
- Venue: Meralco Theater; Pasig City
- Hosted by: Pops Fernandez; Maja Salvador; Xian Lim

The 4th PMPC Star Awards for Music by the Philippine Movie Press Club (PMPC), honored the best Filipino music of 2011. The ceremony took place on September 9, 2012 in Meralco Theater, Pasig City.

The PMPC Star Awards for Music were hosted by Pops Fernandez, Maja Salvador and Xian Lim. A delayed telecast of the award ceremony was broadcast by ABS-CBN Sunday's Best on September 16, 2012.

== Winners and nominees ==
The following are the nominations for the 4th PMPC Star Awards for Music, covering music released in 2011.

Winners are listed first and indicated in bold.

=== Major categories ===
| Album of the Year | Song of the Year |
|---|---|
| **"Araw Oras Tagpuan" – Sponge Cola (Universal Records)**; "Awit Para Sa'yo" – Erik Santos (Star Records); "Breathe Again" – Jed Madela (Universal Records); "Forevermore" – Juris (Star Records); "No Water, No Moon" – Bamboo (PolyEast Records); "Outbound" – Christian Bautista (Universal Records); "Stay Alive" – Nina (Universal Records) | **"Ako Kung Wala Ka" – Erik Santos (Star Records)**; "Breathe Again" – Jed Madela (Universal Records); "Hindi Kita Iiwan" – Sam Milby (Star Records); "I'm Already King" – Christian Bautista (Universal Records); "Kahit 'Di Mo Sabihin" – Juris (Star Records); "Questions" – Bamboo (PolyEast Records); "Tambay" – Sponge Cola (Universal Records) |
| Male Recording Artist of the Year | Female Recording Artist of the Year |
| **Jed Madela – "Breathe Again" (Universal Records)**; Basil Valdez – "Basil Valdez" (Vicor Records); Christian Bautista – "Outbound" (Universal Records); Erik Santos – "Awit Para Sa'yo" (Star Records); Gary Valenciano – "With Love" (Star Records); Martin Nievera – "Mga Awit at Damdamin" (PolyEast Records); Noel Cabangon – "Panaginip" (Universal Records) | **Aiza Seguerra – "Songs from The Vault" (Star Records)**; Angeline Quinto – "Fall In Love Again" (Star Records); Ivy Violan – "In Love" (Universal Records); Jaya – "All Souled Out" (Universal Records); Juris – "Forevermore" (Star Records); Lea Salonga – "The Journey So Far" (Ivory Music); Yeng Constantino – "Yeng Versions Live" (Star Records) |
| New Male Recording Artist of the Year | New Female Recording Artist of the Year |
| **DK Valdez – "It's All About Love" (BWB Records)**; Derrick Monasterio – "Tween Academy: Class of 2012" (GMA Records); DJ Joph – "DJ Joph" (D'Concorde Records); JM de Guzman – "JM de Guzman" (Ivory Music); Khen Magat – "Khen Magat" (BWB Records); Kristoffer Martin – "Tween Academy: Class of 2012" (GMA Records); Marcelito Pomoy – "Duet Yourself" (Star Records); Robin Nievera – "Robin Nievera Overwait" (PolyEast Records) | **Solenn Heussaff – "Solenn" (MCA Music)**; Anna Melissa – "Her First album" (Smashbox Productions, Inc.); Anne Curtis – "Annebisyosa" (Viva Records); Bunny – "Bunny" (PolyEast Records); Ethel Rose – "A Life Story" (Ecclesiastes Entertainment); Paula Bianca – "Paula Bianca" (Vicor Records); Raia Quiroz – "Tara Na!" (D'Concorde Records & LDG Prod. & Ent. Recording Co.); Sheng Belmonte – "Sheng Belmonte" (Sony Music Philippines and Ivory Music); Zia Quizon – "Zia Quizon" (PolyEast Records) |
| Duo/Group of the Year | Music Video of the Year |
| **The Company – "Lighthearted 2" (Viva Records)**; J Brothers – "Jamming" (Jbrostudios); Mocha Girls – "18+ Restricted" (Bellhaus Entertainment); MYMP – "The Unreleased Acoustic Collection" (Galaxy Records); Side A – "Side A 25" (Warner Music Philippines); Sponge Cola – "Araw Oras Tagpuan" (Universal Records); Wonder Gays – "Blind Item" (D'Concorde Records and LDG Productions & Entertainment Recording Co.) | **"Where Do I Begin" – Gary Valenciano (Star Records)**; **Cathy Garcia-Molina, director**; "Ako Na Lang" – Zia Quizon (PolyEast Records); Nani Naguit and Pao Santiago Pangan, directors; "Disney" – Tanya Markova (MCA Music); King Palisoc, director; "Dance" – Nina (PolyEast Records); Sean Lim, director; "Kay Tagal Kitang Hinintay" – Sponge Cola (Universal Records); Yan Yuzon, director; "Letting Go" – Jamie Rivera (Star Records); Jeffrey Tan and Yeng Constantino, directors; "To Reach You" – Anja Aguilar (Viva Records); Monti Parungao, director |

=== Pop category ===
| Pop Album of the Year | Male Pop Artist of the Year |
|---|---|
| **"Outbound" – Christian Bautista (Universal Records)**; "Awit Para Sa'yo" –Erik Santos (Star Records); "In Love" – Ivy Violan (Universal Records); "Basil Valdez" – Basil Valdez (Vicor Records); "Side @ 25" – Side A (Warner Music Philippines); "The Journey So Far" – Lea Salonga (Ivory Music); "With Love" – Gary Valenciano (Star Records) | **Christian Bautista – "Outbound" (Universal Records)**; Basil Valdez – "Basil Valdez" (Vicor Records); Dingdong Avanzado – "Download 25th Anniversary Songbook" (Viva Records); Erik Santos – "Awit Para Sa'yo" (Star Records); Gary Valenciano – "With Love" (Star Records); Jed Madela – "Breathe Again" (Universal Records); Sam Milby – "Be Mine" (Star Records) |
| Female Pop Artist of the Year | |
| **Angeline Quinto – "Fall In Love Again" (Star Records)**; Ivy Violan – "In Love" (Universal Records); Jaya – "All Souled Out" (Universal Records); Lea Salonga – "The Journey So Far" (Ivory Music); Nina – "Stay Alive" (Universal Records); Rachelle Ann Go – "Unbreakable" (Viva Records); Sitti – "Sessions" (Warner Music Philippines) | |

=== Rock and Acoustic category ===
| Rock Album of the Year | Male Rock Artist of the Year |
|---|---|
| **"Romantico" – Kamikazee (Universal Records)**; "Araw Oras Tagpuan" – Sponge Cola (Universal Records); "Dalawang Mukha ng Pag-ibig" – Ebe Dancel (Warner Music Philippines); "Kinse Kalibre" – Slapshock (PolyEast Records); "No Water, No Moon" – Bamboo (PolyEast Records); "Paula Bianca" – Paula Bianca (Vicor Records); "Yeng Versions Live" – Yeng Constantino (Star Records) | **Sponge Cola – "Araw Oras Tagpuan" (Universal Records)**; Bamboo – "No Water, No Moon" (PolyEast Records); Ebe Dancel – "Dalawang Mukha ng Pag-ibig" (Warner Music Philippines); Kamikazee – "Romantico" (Universal Records); Robin Nievera – "Overwait" (PolyEast Records); Slapshock – "Kinse Kalibre" (PolyEast Records); Tanya Markova – "Shock Pop 2CD Edition" (MCA Music) |
| Female Rock Artist of the Year | Acoustic Album of the Year |
| **Yeng Constantino – "Yeng Versions Live" (Star Records)**; Cathy Go – "Find My Way To You" (Mayumi Records); Paula Bianca – "Paula Bianca" (Vicor Records) | **"Panaginip" – Noel Cabangon (Universal Records)**; "Forevermore" – Juris (Star Records); "I Love Acoustic 4" – Sabrina (MCA Music); "Mad About Acoustic" – Davey Langit (Viva Records); "Saktong Akustik New Interpretations of OPM's Certified Hits" – Various artists (Universal Records); "Songs from The Vault" – Aiza Seguerra (Star Records); "Today's Favorite Love Songs Unplugged 7 (An Acoustic Must-Have)" – Ava Santos (Ivory Music) |
| Male Acoustic Artist of the Year | Female Acoustic Artist of the Year |
| **Noel Cabangon – "Panaginip" (Universal Records)**; Davey Langit – "Mad About Acoustic 2" (Viva Records); Jay Perillo – "Jay Perillo" (Viva Records); JM de Guzman – "JM de Guzman" (Ivory Music); Paolo Santos – "How Sweet It Is" (Ivory Music) | **Juris – "Forevermore" (Star Records)**; Aiza Seguerra – "Songs from the Vault" (Star Records); Ava Santos – "Today’s Favorite Love Songs Unplugged 7 (An Acoustic Must-Have)" (Ivory Music); Barbie Almalbis – "Goodbye My Shadow" (12 Stone Records); MYMP – "The Unreleased Acoustic Collection" (Galaxy Records); Nozomi – "Before I Reach Sixteen" (PolyEast Records); Sabrina – "I Love Acoustic 4" (MCA Music); Stephanie Dan – "Love to Love Acoustic" (Ivory Music) |

=== Novelty and jazz category ===
| Novelty Album of the Year | Novelty Song of the Year |
|---|---|
| **"Blind Item" – Wonder Gays (D’Concorde Records & LDG Production & Entertainment Recording Co.)**; "Kendeng Kendeng" – Willie Revillame (Viva Records) | **Wonder Gays – "Blind Item" (D’Concorde Records & LDG Production & Entertainment Recording Co.)**; Willie Revillame – "Kendeng Kendeng" (Viva Records) |
| Novelty Artist of the Year | |
**"Blind Item" – Wonder Gays (D’Concorde Records & LDG Production & Entertainment Recording Co.)**; "Kendeng Kendeng" – Willie Revillame (Viva Records)

=== Album category ===
| Dance Album of the Year | Revival Album of the Year |
|---|---|
| **"18+ Restricted" – Mocha Girls (Bellhaus Entertainment)**; *Kendeng Kendeng" – "Willie Revillame (Viva Records); "Solenn" – Solenn Heussaff – (MCA Music) | **"Mga Awit at Damdamin" – Martin Nievera (PolyEast Records)**; "Duet Yourself" – Marcelito Pomoy (Star Records); "Lighthearted 2" – The Company (Viva Records); "Basil Valdez" – Basil Valdez (Vicor Records); "Side A 25" – Side A (Warner Music Philippines); "The Journey So Far" – Lea Salonga (Ivory Music); "With Love" – Gary Valenciano (Star Records) |
| Compilation Album of the Year | Album Cover Design of the Year |
| **"The Pearl Collection, 30 Years of the Most Memorable Theme Songs" – Various artists (Viva Records)**; "40 Most Requested Love Songs" – Various artists (MCA Music); "Original Artist OPM I Love" – Various artists (Viva Records); "Pinoy Alternatib" – Various artists (Ivory Music); "Pinoy Senti Hits All Original Artists" – Various artists (Ivory Music); "Toni Gonzaga Greatest Hits" – Toni Gonzaga (Star Records); "Walang Hanggan" – Various artists (Star Records) | **"No Water, No Moon" Bamboo (PolyEast Records)**; "Breathe Again" – Jed Madela (Universal Records); "Mga Awit at Damdamin" – Martin Nievera (PolyEast Records); "Outbound" – Christian Bautista (Universal Records) |

=== Concert category ===
| Concert of the Year | Male Concert Performer of the Year |
|---|---|
| **"It’s Complicated" – Jose Mari Chan and The Company (Beginnings at 20 Plus Incorporated and Star Express)**; "In the Company of Side A" – The Company and Side A Viva Concerts); "Jose & Wally: A Party for Every Juan" – Jose Manalo and Wally Bayola (APT Entertainment); "Martin Nievera: Tribute" – Martin Nievera (Viva Concerts); "Mr. & Mrs. A" – Ogie Alcasid and Regine Velasquez (Starmedia Entertainment); "No Other Concert (Annebisyosa)" – Anne Curtis (Viva Concerts); "What Love Is" – Martin Nievera and Sarah Geronimo (Viva Concerts) | **Martin Nievera – "Tribute" (Viva Concerts)**; Jose Mari Chan – "It’s Complicated" (Beginnings at 20 Plus Inc. and Star Express); Kean Cipriano – "One Stage, One Night" (Cross and Arrow Events Management and Beginnings at 20 Plus Inc.); Ogie Alcasid – "Mr. & Mrs. A" (Starmedia Entertainment); Piolo Pascual – "Piolo Meets the Maestro, Ryan Cayabyab" (Xclusive Hits and Events, Inc.); Rico J. Puno – "The Best of Rico J" (Viva Concerts) |
| Female Concert Performer of the Year | Dou/Group Concert of the Year |
| **Sarah Geronimo – "What Love Is" (Viva Concerts)**; Charice Pempengco – "Infinity Tour" (Media Sync Production); Rachelle Ann Go – "Seasons of Love" (Viva Concerts); Regine Velasquez – "Mr. & Mrs. A)" (Starmedia Entertainment); Sharon Cuneta – "Once in a Lifetime)" (Viva Concerts); Toni Gonzaga – "Toni @ 10" (Star Events, Epic Entertainment) | **Jose Manalo and Wally Bayola – "Jose & Wally: A Party for Every Juan" (APT Entertainment)**; Pop Girls – "PPop Explosion" (Viva Concerts); Side A – "In the Company of Side A" (Viva Concerts); The Company – "In the Company of Side A" (Viva Concerts); XLR8 – "PPop Explosion" (Viva Concerts) |

Note: There were no entries for RnB Album/RnB Artist, Rap Album/Rap Artist of the Year and NO Alternative Album of the Year.

=== Special awards ===
Pilita Corrales Lifetime Achievement Awards: Jose Mari Chan

Ang Natatanging Alagad ng Musika

- Boy Christopher (Composer)
- Lito Camo (Composer)
- Vehnee Saturno (Composer)
- Gary Valenciano
- Kuh Ledesma
- Lea Salonga
- Martin Nievera
- Ogie Alcasid
- Pops Fernandez
- Regine Velasquez
- Sharon Cuneta
- Zsa Zsa Padilla
