= Top One Project =

Filipino boy band

Top One Project (T.O.P.)
- Origin: Philippines
- Genres: Pop, OPM
- Years active: 2015–2018
- Label: GMA Records
- Members: Mico Cruz; Joshua Jacobe; Adrian Pascual; Louie Pedroso
- Past members: Miko Manguba
- Website: Top One Project

Top One Project (abbreviated as T.O.P.) was a Filipino boy band based in the Philippines, originally composed of the grand winners of GMA Network's reality show To the Top — Adrian Pascual, Joshua Jacobe, Louie Pedroso, Mico Cruz, and Miko Manguba. The group signed under GMA's Artist Center and its label GMA Records after winning the competition in 2015. The group released their debut album digitally on April 28, 2016 with their carrier single, "Pag-gising".

== History ==
=== 2015: To the Top ===
In 2015, GMA Network created To the Top, the Philippines' first multi-platform boy band competition. The competition invited talented male singers from different school organizations nationwide to form the newest boy band sensation. Eighteen contestants went through rigorous training in singing and dancing under The CompanY's Moy Ortiz, Sweet Plantado and OJ Mariano; Sonic State Audio writers and producers Chino David, Brian Lotho, Tony V and Jon Ong; Madelle and Prince Paltu-ob, and Jesse "Reflex" Gotangco of Philippine All Stars; and the Maestro Ryan Cayabyab.

In the series' finale, Adrian Pascual, Joshua Jacobe, Louie Pedroso, Mico Cruz, and Miko Manguba were named the grand winners and formed Top One Project. Prior to joining the contest, Manguba, Pedroso and Cruz, are veteran performers in their school glee clubs. Magbanua serves as the leader of the group.

=== 2016: Debut album and concert ===
Top One Project's debut album, T.O.P., was released digitally on April 28, 2016, available on Spotify and iTunes. Under GMA Records, T.O.P. had the chance to re-record five of the most popular songs from To the Top and an original song for the album. It features six tracks: "Bakit Ganon", "Somebody", "Kaya Ko, Kaya Mo", "Alaala", their original composition, "San Na", and carrier single, "Paggising". Most of these songs are written by known musicians in the OPM industry such as Chino David from Silent Sanctuary and Brian Lotho who are both under Sonic State Audio. "San Na" was an experimental track as the group challenges their skills in writing and music production. Louie Pedroso and Mico Cruz wrote most of the lyrics while Miko Manguba, Joshua Jacobe, and Adrian Pascual focused on the overall sound and arrangement of the song. Physical copies of the album were released on May 14, 2016 and reached the third spot on the Astro Charts for the top-selling OPM albums for the month of May. Top One Project performed for almost 40,000 people on June 12, 2016 at the Philippine Arena to promote their debut album.

Top One Project had their first major concert, titled T.O.P. in Concert, on October 28, 2016 at the Music Museum.

In 2018, Miko Manguba transferred to GMA Records' rival record label, Star Music, officially announcing the end of the group.

After months on inactivity, the band held their last concert in March.

== Members ==
- Mico Cruz

Mico C. was born Michaelangelo Ramos Cruz on January 11, 1995 (age 31)

- Joshua Jacobe

Joshua was born Mark Joshua Marcelo Jacobe on July 3, 1994 (age 32)

- Adrian Pascual

Adrian was born Adrian Francisco Pascual on August 21, 1998 (age 27)

- Louie Pedroso

Louie was born Leonard Louie Pedroso on November 21, 1995 (age 30)

- Miko Manguba

Miko M. was born Jamiko Allan Sabbun Manguba on April 24, 1994 (age 32)

== Discography ==
=== Album ===
- Top One Project (2016)

=== Singles ===
- "Paggising" (2016, Filipino theme song of Pretty Woman)
- "Sa'n Na" (2016)
- "Ikaw Nga" (2017, theme song of Mulawin vs. Ravena)

=== Other works ===
- "Ang Pinaka Theme" (Theme song of Ang Pinaka)
- "Pinoy M.D. Theme" (Theme song of Pinoy M.D.)
- "Mag-road Trip Tayo" (Theme song of Road Trip)

== Filmography ==
=== Television series ===
Year	Title	Member(s) and role(s)	Notes	Network
2016	Juan Tamad	Wedding singers	"Juan Gets Married?" episode	GMA Network
2017	My Love from the Star	Adrian Pascual as Young Winston	Uncredited role	GMA Network
2017	Wish Ko Lang	Adrian Pascual as –	"Nang Matupok ang mga Pangarap" episode	GMA Network
2017	Magpakailanman	Adrian Pascual as Teban	"Mga Sikreto ng Aking Pamilya" episode	GMA Network
2017	Magpakailanman	Joshua Jacobe as Mahjie	"Ang Pagmamahal ng Isang Amang Beki: The Jeremy Sabido Story" episode	GMA Network
2017	Imbestigador	Adrian Pascual as Michael Angelo Remecio	"Sako" episode	GMA Network
2017	Super Ma'am	Joshua Jacobe as −		GMA Network
2017	Wish Ko Lang	Adrian Pascual as –	"Ang Pagbabago ni Avatar" episode	GMA Network
2018	Ang Forever Ko'y Ikaw	Adrian Pascual as Dax and Joshua Jacobe as Jigs	Supporting roles	GMA Network

=== Other appearances ===
Members of Top One Project also appeared as guests on various programs produced by GMA Entertainment TV and GMA News and Public Affairs. These programs include GMA Network's Unang Hirit, CelebriTV, Walang Tulugan with the Master Showman, Eat Bulaga!, Power House, AHA!, Sarap Diva, MARS, Sunday PinaSaya, and Wowowin and GMA News TV's Good News. Top One Project also appeared in NET25's Music and Letters in 2016. Top One Project also appeared as performers of GMA Network's new year countdown specials for 2017

Top One Project also appeared as musical guests in GMA Network's online series Playlist and GMA Records' Spotlight Music Sessions.

== Accolades ==
Year	Award Giving Body	Category	Nominee/Nominated work	Result	Source
2016	8th PMPC Star Awards for Music	Duo/Group of the Year	T.O.P.	Won	
2016	8th PMPC Star Awards for Music	Dance Album of the Year	Top One Project	Nominated	
