= Erik Santos discography =

Filipino pop singer

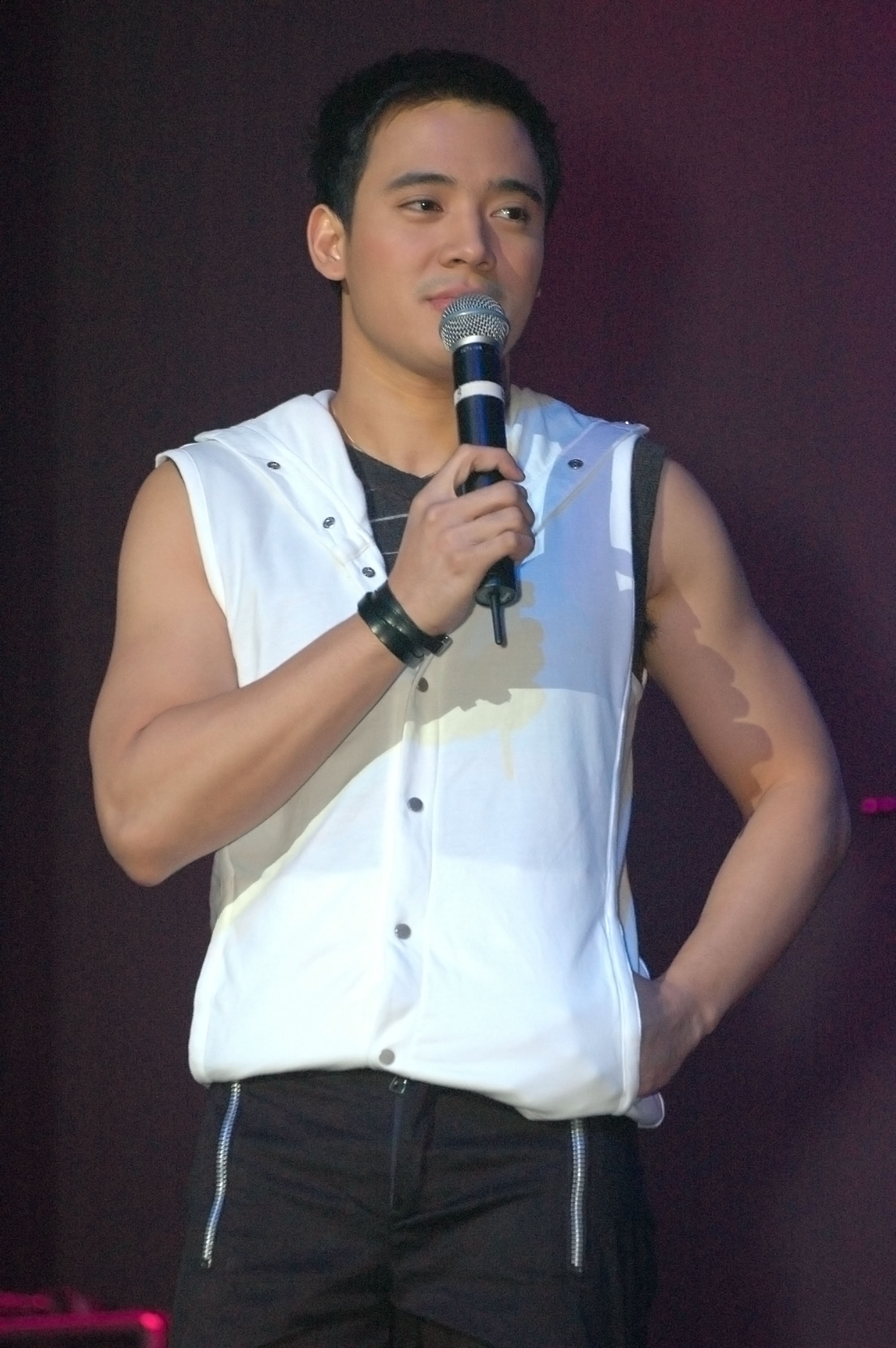
- Santos performing on a concert in Chicago in 2008
- Studio albums: 5
- Extended plays: 1
- Compilation albums: 1
- Singles: 26
- Music videos: 18

The discography of Erik Santos, a Filipino pop singer, consists of five studio albums, one compilation/collaborative album, one extended play, and 26 singles.

== Albums ==
=== Studio albums ===
Title	Album details	Certifications / sales (Note: Sales are based on certifications alone)
This Is the Moment	Released: January 4, 2004; Label: Star Music; Formats: CD	PARI: 3× Platinum; PHI: 90,000
Loving You Now	Released: January 1, 2005; Label: Star Music; Formats: CD	PARI: Platinum; PHI: 30,000
Your Love	Released: September 19, 2006; Label: Star Music; Formats: CD	PARI: Gold; PHI: 15,000
All I Want This Christmas	Released: November 5, 2007; Label: Star Music; Formats: CD	PARI: Gold; PHI: 15,000
Erik Santos: The Jim Brickman Songbook	Released: July 8, 2009; Label: Star Music; Formats: CD, digital download	PARI: Platinum; PHI: 30,000
Awit Para Sa'yo	Released: August 12, 2011; Label: Star Music; Formats: CD, digital download	PARI: Gold; PHI: 7,500
The Erik Santos Collection	Released: May 25, 2013; Label: Star Music; Formats: CD, digital download	PARI: Gold; PHI: 7,500

=== Compilation albums ===
Year	Album details
Face Off (with Christian Bautista)	Released: 2008; Label: Warner, Star; Formats: CD, digital download

=== Extended plays ===
Year	EP details	Certifications / sales
I'll Never Go	Released: January 1, 2005; Label: Star Music; Formats: CD	PARI: Platinum; PHI: 30,000
Champion Reborn	Released: October 30, 2015; Label: Star Music; Formats: CD, digital download	

== Singles ==
Single	Year	Album
"I Believe I Can Fly"	2003	Star in a Million
"This Is the Moment"	2004	Star in a Million
"Pagbigyang Muli"	2004	This Is the Moment
"Di Ko Kaya"	2004	This Is the Moment
"Now That I Have You" (with Sheryn Regis)	2004	Now That I Have You Soundtrack
"Kung Akin ang Mundo"	2005	This Is the Moment
"I'll Never Go"	2005	Loving You Now
"Who's Loving You Now"	2005	Loving You Now
"I Will Never Leave You"	2005	Loving You Now
"Goodbye's Not Forever"	2005	Loving You Now
"Bakit Ba Iniibig Ka" (with Regine Velasquez)	2006	Loving You Now
"Kung Maalala Mo"	2006	Loving You Now
"Bitin sa Iyo"	2006	Hotsilog: The ASAP Hotdog Compilation
"Your Love"	2006	Your Love
"Say You'll Never Go"	2006	Your Love
"Next in Line"	2007	Your Love
"Parting Time" (featuring Kyla)	2007	Your Love
"Ngayong Pasko"	2007	All I Want This Christmas
"Here I Am"	2008	Your Love (Platinum Edition)
"Christmas Is"	2008	All I Want This Christmas
"Never Give Up"	2009	Face Off
"My Love Is Here"	2009	Erik Santos: The Jim Brickman Songbook
"It's a Sin to Break a Heart"	2009	Erik Santos: The Jim Brickman Songbook
"If I Just Believed"	2010	Erik Santos: The Jim Brickman Songbook
"Miss You Like Crazy"	2010	Miss You Like Crazy Soundtrack
"Lupa"	2010	60 Taon ng Musika at Soap Opera
"Kulang Ako Kung Wala Ka"	2011	Awit Para Sa'Yo
"Bakit Mahal Pa Rin Kita"	2012	Awit Para Sa'Yo
"This Song Is For You"	2013	Himig Handog P-Pop Love Songs
"Tandaan Mo 'To" (featuring Gloc-9)	2015	Champion Reborn
"Sino Ba Ako Sa 'Yo"	2016	Champion Reborn

== Soundtracks ==
=== Television theme songs ===
Year	Program title	Song title	Network
2003	It Might Be You	It Might Be You	ABS-CBN
2005	Stained Glass	"I'll Never Go"	ABS-CBN
2005	Vietnam Rose	"Magpahanggan Wakas"	ABS-CBN
2005	Green Rose	"I Will Never Leave You"	ABS-CBN
2006	Maging Sino Ka Man	"Maging Sino Ka Man"	ABS-CBN
2007	Sana Maulit Muli	"Say You'll Never Go"	ABS-CBN
2007	Sineserye Presents: May Minamahal	"May Minamahal"	ABS-CBN
2007	Your Song	"Christmas Is"	ABS-CBN
2007	Your Song	"Muntik Na Kitang Minahal"	ABS-CBN
2008	Your Song	"Here I Am"	ABS-CBN
2009	May Bukas Pa	"May Bukas Pa"	ABS-CBN
2009	Katorse	"My Love Is Here"	ABS-CBN
2009	PHR: Bud Brothers	"Kung Akin Ang Mundo"	ABS-CBN
2010	Rosalka	"Lupa"	ABS-CBN
2010	Magkaribal	"If I Just Believed"	ABS-CBN
2010	Your Song	"Christmas Is A Time To Love"	ABS-CBN
2011	Ikaw Ay Pag-Ibig	"Sapagkat Diyos Ay Pag-ibig"	ABS-CBN
2011	My Binondo Girl	"Kulang Ako Kung Wala Ka"	ABS-CBN
2011	Maria la del Barrio	"Pagbigyang Muli"	ABS-CBN
2011	Guns N' Roses	"Sana Ikaw"	ABS-CBN
2012	PHR: Hiyas	"Di Lang Ikaw"	ABS-CBN
2012	Walang Hanggan	"Iisa Pa Lamang"	ABS-CBN
2012	Kahit Puso'y Masugatan	"Hindi Na Magbabago"	ABS-CBN
2013	Apoy Sa Dagat	"I Will Never Leave You"	ABS-CBN
2013	Muling Buksan Ang Puso	"Muling Buksan Ang Puso"	ABS-CBN
2017	My Dear Heart	"Sa'yo Lamang"	ABS-CBN
2017	The Better Half	"Hanggang"	ABS-CBN
2020	Walang Hanggang Paalam	"Walang Hanggang Paalam"	Kapamilya Channel

=== Film theme songs ===
Year	Film title	Song title	Producer
2004	Now That I Have You	"Now That I Have You" (with Sheryn Regis)	Star Cinema
2007	One More Chance	"I'll Never Go"	Star Cinema
2010	Miss You Like Crazy	"Miss You Like Crazy"	Star Cinema
2012	Unofficially Yours	"If You Asked Me To" (with Angeline Quinto)	Star Cinema
2012	Suddenly It's Magic	"Suddenly It's Magic" (with Angeline Quinto)	Star Cinema
2013	A Moment in Time (film)	"You Are My Song"	Star Cinema

== Other appearances ==
Year	Song	Album
2003	"Star in a Million Theme" (with Star in a Million finalists)	Star in a Million (Repackaged)
2003	"I Believe I Can Fly"	Star in a Million (Repackaged)
2003	"This Is the Moment"	Star in a Million (Repackaged)
2003	"I Want to Spend My Lifetime Loving You" (with Sheryn Regis)	Star in a Million (Repackaged)
2003	"It Might Be You" (with Marinel Santos)	Star in a Million (Repackaged)
2004	"WRR Themesong" (with Heart Evangelista)	Non-album single
2004	"What Will I Do My Lord"	The Joys of Healing
2004	"So Real" (with DNA)	Iniwan
2005	"Search for the Star in a Million Theme" (with Sarah Geronimo, Christian Bautista and Mark Bautista)	Search for the Star in a Million
2005	"Now That I Have You" (with Sheryn Regis)	What I Do Best
2005	"Come What May" (with Vina Morales)	Nobody Does It Better
2006	"Bitin sa Iyo"	Hotsilog: The ASAP Hotdog Compilation
2007	"Balik Sa Bayan"	Nagmamahal Kapamilya Album: Songs for Global Pinoys
2008	"It's My Turn" (with Raki Vega)	Love Life
2008	"Gaya ng Dati"	GV25
2009	"Your Heart Today"	Paalam, Maraming Salamat President Corazon C. Aquino
2010	"Iingatan Ka"	Blessings of Love
2013	"This Song Is For You"	Himig Handog P-Pop Love Songs
