= Miko Manguba =

Filipino musician (born 1994)

JMKO
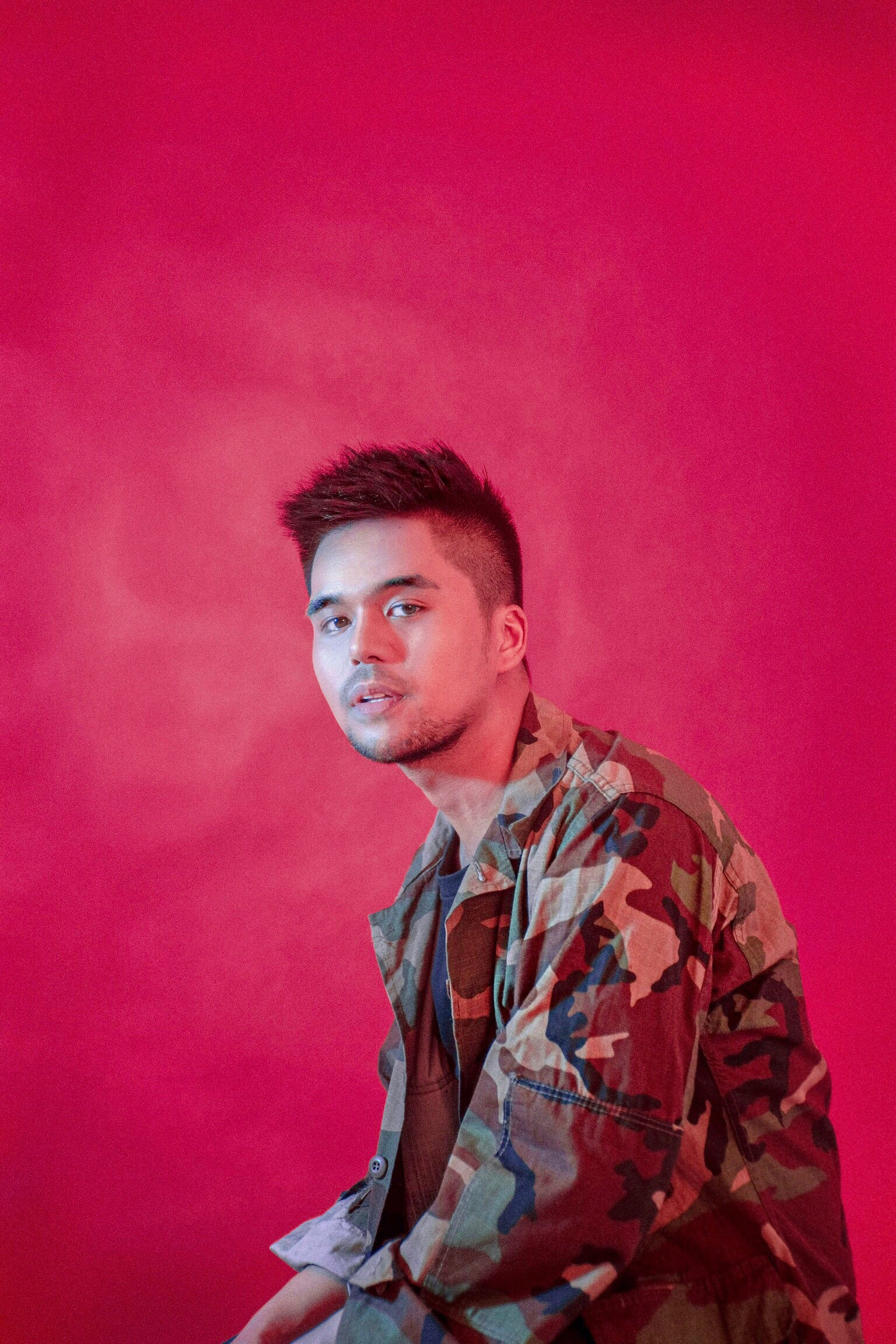

Background information
- Born: Jamiko Allan Sabbun Manguba; 24 April 1994 (age 32); Manila, Philippines
- Genres: Rnb; Pop; Original Pilipino Music
- Occupations: Singer; songwriter
- Instruments: Vocals, drum kit, piano, guitar
- Years active: 2015–present
- Labels: GMA Records; Star Music

Jamiko "Miko" Allan Sabbun Manguba (born 24 April 1994), known as JMKO, is a Filipino singer. He is a musician currently signed under ABS-CBN's Star Music label. Prior to this, he was a member of GMA Network's boy band Top One Project, which emerged as the winning group from the reality television competition To The Top in 2015.

Manguba began his music career as a student at De La Salle University, where he performed with university-based music groups such as De La Salle Innersoul and the a cappella ensemble Taftonic. In 2015, he auditioned for To The Top and became one of its grand winners. The winners were later formed into the group Top One Project.

On 13 December 2018, Manguba signed with Star Music under the name JMKO, marking his transition from GMA Records to its rival label. Since then, he has released several singles on Spotify, including Isla and Ano Nga Ba Tayo, which were featured in the soundtrack of the iWant series Mga Batang Poz.

== Early life ==
Jamiko Allan Sabbun Manguba was born on 24 April 1994 in Manila, Philippines. He is the fourth of five children of Alexander and Marlan Manguba, both natives of Abulug, Cagayan Valley. His parents met in their hometown before eventually settling in Manila.

Manguba completed his primary and secondary education at Claret School of Quezon City. He is currently pursuing a degree in AB Music Production at the in De La Salle–College of Saint Benilde.

== Music career ==
=== De La Salle Innersoul (2012—2015) ===
Upon entering college, Manguba auditioned for De La Salle Innersoul, the official pop vocal group of De La Salle University Manila. Beginning in 2012, he regularly performed in the group's annual concerts, including Revolution (2012), Mga Awit ng Pagsinta (2013), All Souls (2014), and as a guest performer in Soul Adventures of the Piano Man: The Billy Joel Project (2015).

In 2014, Manguba was appointed Division Manager for Production and Logistics. The following year, he served as Head of the Music Committee, where he wrote and produced the official anthem for University Week 2015, titled One World, One La Salle, in collaboration with fellow members of De La Salle Innersoul.

In 2013, Manguba, together with Jennifer Barican, was selected to represent the Philippines at the ASEAN Jazz Festival held at Universiti Kebangsaan Malaysia in Kuala Lumpur, Malaysia. In 2014, he received the Gawad Raya Award from the university's Culture and Arts Office as the Most Promising Performer in Solo Singing. He is recognised as one of the distinguished alumni of De La Salle Innersoul.

=== To The Top (2015) ===
On 9 April 2015, Manguba auditioned for To The Top, the first reality boy band competition produced by GMA Network, alongside hundreds of male singers from various school-based organisations. He was selected by a director from the network to be part of the show's official roster.

Manguba served as the leader of Team C and later the re-formed Team B, achieving success in five out of eight performance showdowns: Showdown 1: Boyband Songs, Showdown 2: Family, Showdown 4: Fun, Showdown 6: OPM Love Songs, and Showdown 7: Ryan Cayabyab Songs/TTT Originals. He also contributed to a win in the Composition Challenge with the original piece Taksil si Yaya. In September 2015, Manguba was named one of the five grand winners of the competition.

=== Top One Project ===
Following their win on To The Top, the group Top One Project (T.O.P.) was signed under GMA Artist Center and GMA Records in 2015. The group released their self-titled debut album digitally on 28 April 2016. The album featured original compositions, including Sa'n Na and the carrier single Pag-gising.

As a member of Top One Project, Manguba—together with Mico Cruz, Joshua Jacobe, Adrian Pascual, and Louie Pedroso—contributed to the album's release and promotion in 2016. In addition to performing, the group made various television appearances as guest performers and took on minor acting roles. During this time, Manguba was officially signed with GMA Network and GMA Records.

=== Star Music – JMKO (2018—present) ===
On 13 December 2018, Manguba signed a recording contract with Star Music under the stage name JMKO (pronounced "Jamiko"), marking his transition from GMA Records to its rival label under ABS-CBN. The signing also signalled the official end of GMA Network's boy band, Top One Project. As of that time, Star Music had yet to announce JMKO's upcoming projects with ABS-CBN.

Around 2020 and 2021, JMKO performed the localised soundtrack of the Chinese drama Story of Yanxi Palace, titled Aahon. He also performed the opening theme song for the teleserye La Vida Lena, which starred Erich Gonzales.

== Discography ==
=== Top One Project (2016) ===
No.	Title	Writer(s)	Producer(s)	Length
1.	"Sa'n Na"	Louie Pedroso; Mico Cruz	GMA Records; Miko Manguba; Joshua Jacobe; Adrian Pascual	3:03
2.	"Paggising"	Chino David (Silent Sanctuary)	Sonic State Audio; GMA Records	2:40
3.	"Bakit Gano'n"	Brian Lotho	Sonic State Audio; GMA Records	3:01
4.	"Somebody"	Chino David (Silent Sanctuary)	Sonic State Audio; GMA Records	3:09
5.	"Kaya Ko, Kaya Mo"	Martin De Vera; Miko Manguba; Louie Pedroso; Joshua Jacobe; Cholo Dela Cruz	Sonic State Audio; GMA Records	3:03
6.	"Alaala"	Brian Lotho	Sonic State Audio; GMA Records	3:27

== Filmography ==
Year	Title	Role
2016	Sunday PinaSaya	Top One Project
2016	Juan Tamad – Valentine's Day Special	Top One Project
2016	Ang Pinaka (Theme song)	Theme song recording
2015	Sarap Diva	Top One Project
2015	AHA! – Christmas Special	Top One Project
2015	Power House	Top One Project
2015	Pinoy MD (Theme song)	Theme song recording
2015	AHA! – Desserts	Top One Project
2015	Walang Tulugan with the Master Showman	Top One Project
2015	CelebriTV	Top One Project
2015	Unang Hirit	Top One Project
2015	24 Oras	Top One Project
2015	To The Top (TV series)	"Music Man of QC"

== Songwriting/Music arrangement credits ==
Year	Title	Artist	Album	Notes
2016	"Sa'n Na"	Top One Project	Top One Project (2016)	Co-writer; musical arranger
2016	"Kaya Ko, Kaya Mo"	Top One Project	Top One Project (2016)	Co-writer; musical arranger
2016	"Bakit Ganon"	Top One Project	Top One Project (2016)	Musical arranger
2015	"One World, One La Salle"	De La Salle Innersoul	---	Co-writer; musical arranger

== See also ==
- To The Top (TV series)
- Top One Project (T.O.P.)
