= Panky Trinidad =

- Genres: OPM, R&B, Pinoy rock
- Occupation: Singer
- Instrument(s): Vocals, guitar
- Years active: 2006–present

Panky Trinidad is a Filipina singer. She was one of the scholars of the first season of Pinoy Dream Academy in 2006. In 2008, she was chosen to be one of the representatives to the World Championship of the Performing Arts.

== World Championship of Performing Arts ==
In 2008, Panky was chosen as one of the representatives of the Philippine Team for the World Championship of Performing Arts, where she competed for the senior division. Her awards are as follows:

- GOLD - Female Vocal R&b/soul/Jazz - 18-24
- GOLD - Female Vocal Rock - 18-24
- SILVER - Female Vocal Broadway - 18-24
- BRONZE - Female Vocal Pop - 18-24

and she was cited as the Champion of the World for the Vocal R&B/Soul/Jazz - 16-24 Category.

== Discography ==
Albums / Collaborations

Album	Single(s)/Song(s)
Sana Maulit Muli OST (ASAP Music)	1. Time After Time
Pinoy Dream Academy Originals Vol. 4 (Dream Music)	1. Karamay
Pinoy Dream Academy Originals Vol. 2 (Dream Music)	1. Behind Those Eyes (with Chai Fonacier)

Singles / Theme Songs:

- Umiinit, Umaapoy, Lumiliyab - Dragonna OST

== Filmography ==
Year	Title	Role	Network
2006	Pinoy Dream Academy	Herself/Scholar	ABS-CBN
2007	Breakfast	Guest co-host	Studio 23
2007	ASAP 07	Performer, "Dream Request Live"	ABS-CBN
2013	Party Pilipinas	Guest Performer	GMA Network

== Recent ==
She is now being managed by KB Entertainment, and she looks forward in doing more TV guestings.

Panky Trinidad announced last February 2009 that she will be part of a new band, Version 4.0, as well as plans to perform around Europe in 2009.
