= Road Trip (TV program) =

Philippine television reality show

- Title card
- Genre: Travelogue; Reality show
- Directed by: Aaron Papins Mendoza; May delos Santos
- Opening theme: "Mag-road Trip Tayo" by Top One Project
- Country of origin: Philippines
- Original language: Tagalog
- No. of episodes: 27

Production
- Executive producer: Arvin Garcia
- Camera setup: Multiple-camera setup
- Running time: 33–38 minutes
- Production company: GMA News and Public Affairs

Original release
- Network: GMA Network
- Release: July 23, 2017 – January 14, 2018

Road Trip is a Philippine television travel reality show broadcast by GMA Network. It premiered on July 23, 2017 on the network's Sunday Grande line up. The show concluded on January 14, 2018, with a total of 27 episodes.

The show is streaming online on YouTube.

== Ratings ==
According to AGB Nielsen Philippines' Nationwide Urban Television Audience Measurement People in television homes, the pilot episode of Road Trip earned a 6% rating. The final episode scored a 4.7% rating.

== Accolades ==
Accolades received by Road Trip
Year	Award	Category	Recipient	Result	Ref.
2017	31st PMPC Star Awards for Television	Best Travel Show	Road Trip	Nominated	
