= Star in a Million (album) =

Compilation album by Various Artists
- Released: 2003
- Recorded: 2003
- Genres: Pop, OPM
- Length: 49:48
- Label: Star Music
- Producer: Jonathan Manalo

Alternate Album Covers
- Star in a Million Repackaged Edition

Star in a Million is a compilation album from ABS-CBN's talent show Star in a Million in 2003. The songs were performed by the top 10 finalists of the show. The album was released in the Philippines by Star Music. It was officially certified Double Platinum (80,000 copies sold) by the Philippine Association of the Record Industry (PARI).

== Track listing ==
=== Original Edition ===
1. "Star in a Million Theme" (3:37) - Star in a Million Finalists (Music by: Soc Villanueva)
2. "Say That You Love Me" (4:51) - Christian Bautista (Music by: Louie Ocampo & Alan Ayque
3. "I Can't Tell You Why" (4:02) - Gayle Dizon (Music by: Frey)
4. "If I Didn't Love You" (4:43) - Czarina Rosales (Music by: Arema/Reswick/Werfel)
5. "Bukas Na Lang Kita Mamahalin" (3:43) - Marinel Santos (Music by: Jimmy Borja)
6. "Run to You" (4:38) - Dk Tijam (Music by: A. Rich/Jud Friedman)
7. "In My Life" (3:48) - Michell San Miguel (Music by: Austin)
8. "I Love You Goodbye" (3:43) - Teresa Garcia (Music by: Warren)
9. "Come in Out of the Rain" (4:13) - Sheryn Regis (Music by: Austin Curtis Bone/Lyras/E. Williamson)
10. "You" (3:53) - Johann Escanan (Music by: Gerry Paraiso)
11. "I Believe I Can Fly" (5:01) - Erik Santos Music by: R. Kelly
12. "Star in a Million Theme Reprise" (3:36) - Instrumental (Music by: Soc Villanueva)

=== Repackaged Edition ===
After the contest folded up, a repackaged edition of the album was released adding the following songs to the original 12 tracks:

1. "This Is the Moment"
2. "I Want to Spend My Lifetime Loving You"
3. "It Might Be You"
