= To the Top (TV series) =

2015 Philippine television reality show

- Title card
- Genre: Reality competition
- Presented by: Christian Bautista
- Judges: Ryan Cayabyab; Moy Ortiz; Sweet Plantado; OJ Mariano
- Country of origin: Philippines
- Original language: Tagalog
- No. of episodes: 20

Production
- Production locations: Quezon City, Philippines
- Camera setup: Multiple-camera setup
- Running time: 30–45 minutes
- Production companies: GMA Entertainment TV; GMA Public Affairs

Original release
- Network: GMA Network
- Release: July 25 – September 27, 2015

To the Top is a 2015 Philippine television reality competition show broadcast by GMA Network. Hosted by Christian Bautista, it premiered on July 25, 2015 on the network's Sabado Star Power sa Gabi line up. The show concluded on September 27, 2015, with a total of 20 episodes.

== Cast ==
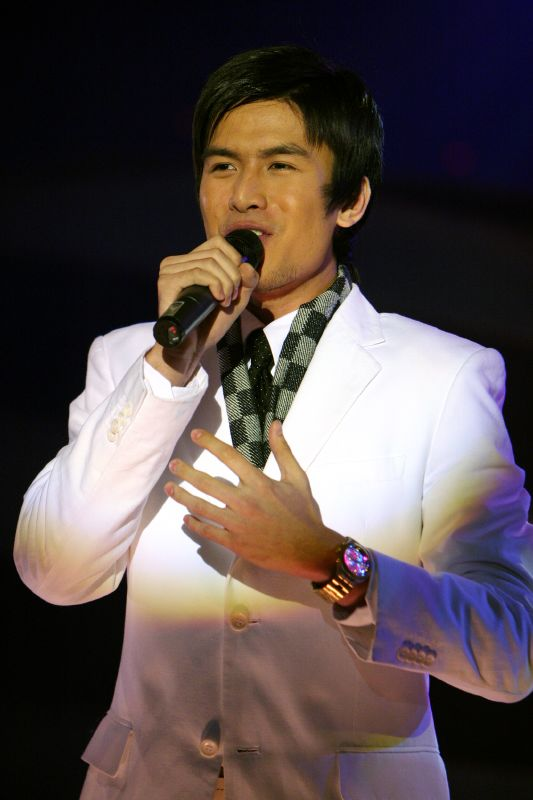
Christian Bautista serves as the host.

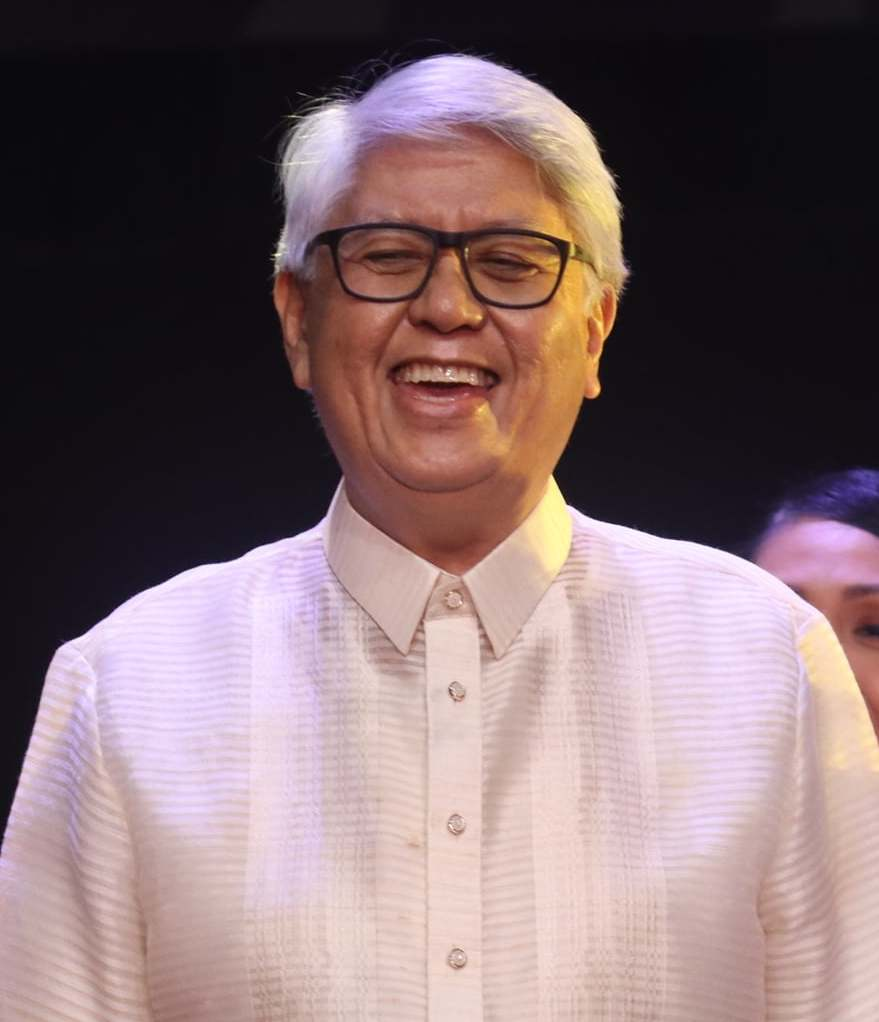
Ryan Cayabyab serves as a judge.

Host

- Christian Bautista

Judges

- Ryan Cayabyab
- Moy Ortiz
- Sweet Plantado
- OJ Mariano

== Ratings ==
According to AGB Nielsen Philippines' Mega Manila household television ratings, the pilot episode of To the Top earned a 13.5% rating. The final episode scored a 9.5% rating.
