= Fall in Love Again =

Fall in Love Again may refer to:

- Fall in Love Again (Ms. Dynamite song)
- Fall in Love Again (Eddie Money song)
- Fall in Love Again, a song by P1Harmony
- Fall in Love Again, a song by Rag'n'Bone Man from Life by Misadventure
- F.I.L.A. (Fall in Love Again), a song by Twice from Formula of Love: O+T=＜3
