= Twilite =

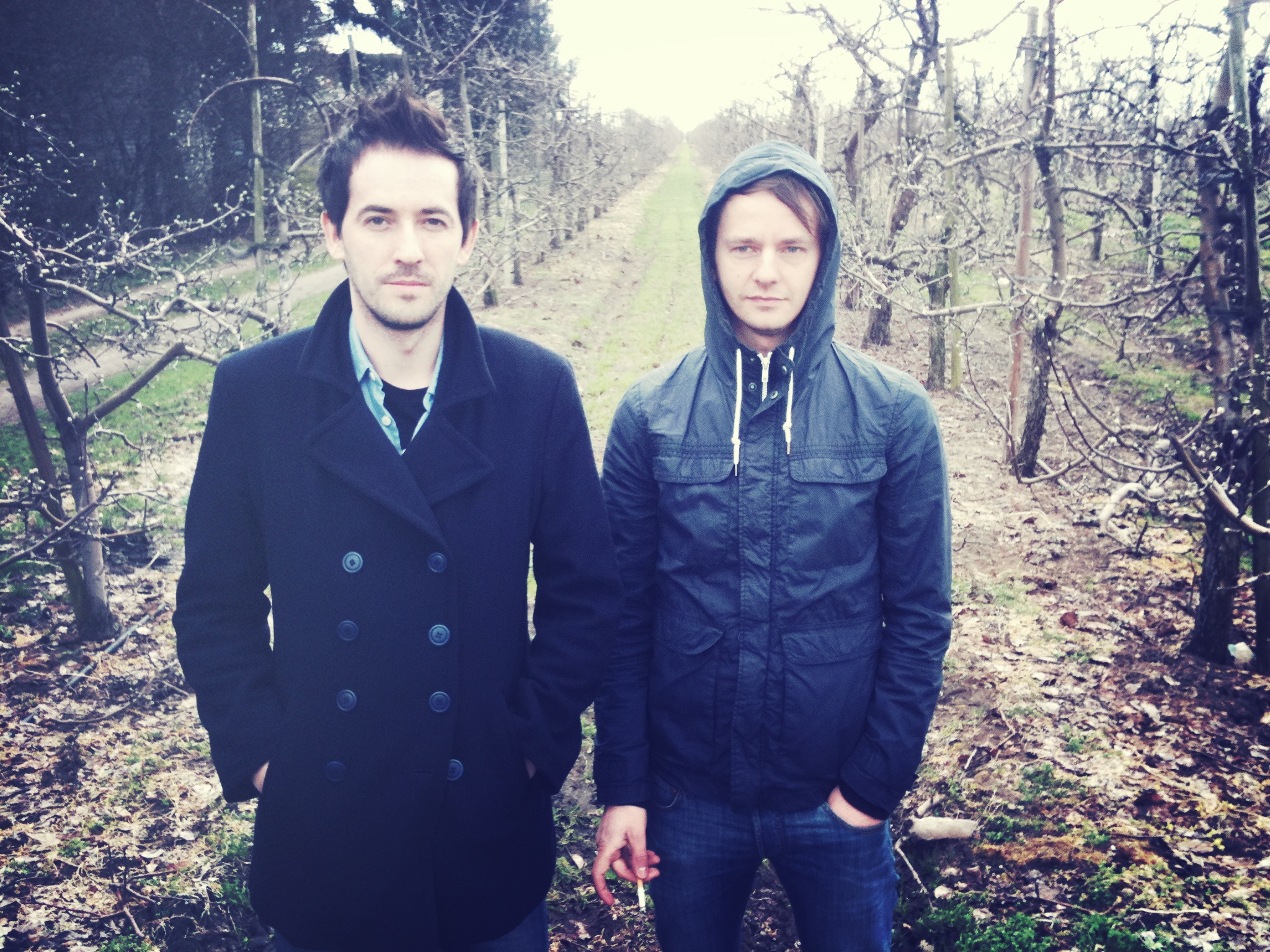
- Twilite fot. M. Michalski

Background information
- Origin: Poland
- Genres: Indie folk
- Years active: 2006–present
- Labels: Ampersand Records, Isound Labels
- Members: Paweł Milewski, Rafał Bawirsz
- Website: Twilite Music

Twilite are a Polish duo playing indie-folk/singer-songwriter music featuring acoustic guitar and melancholic aura. The group consists of Paweł Milewski and Rafał Bawirsz.

The group started in 2006 in Ireland. Songs were recorded in domestic environment and have been published on 2nd and 3rd part of Offensywa compilation by Piotr Stelmach. In May 2008 Twilite has been noticed and invited by Kapsa brothers from Contemporary Noise Sextet to record in Electric Eye Studio pieces for debut album titled Bits and Pieces. The album is a summary of compositions from 2 years of living in Dublin. Album Bits and Pieces came into light on January 24, 2009.

Beside two all-Poland tours, Twilite performed on Open'er Festival (2009) and as a support for José González, The Whitest Boy Alive or The Twilight Singers. In May 2010 EP Else was released for free download which producers were Piotr Maciejewski (Muchy, Drivealone) and Maciej Frycz. It was published under polish Ampersand Records and was promoted with clip Fire promoted by Polish, French, Greek and Turkish edition of MySpace.

On March 28, 2011 Quiet Giant, the second longplay was released. It consists of 12 compositions, richer in musical arrangements than the one before. There appear drums, piano, electric guitar, clarinet and trumpet. The guests include Swedish singer Billie Lindahl (known as Promise and the Monster), trumpeter Maciej Fortuna or Max Psuja, drummer of Kumka Olik. Piotr Maciejewski (playing drums, piano and guitars) and Maciej Frycz were producers of the album. The album gathered very favorable opinions.

== Discography ==
- Quiet Giant (2011)
- Else EP (2010)
- Bits and Pieces (2009)
