= Romance Revisited: The Love Songs of Jose Mari Chan =

Studio album by Christian Bautista
- Released: August 20, 2009
- Recorded: 2009
- Genre: Pop
- Length: 75:26
- Labels: Universal (Philippines); Aquarius Musikindo (Indonesia)
- Producers: Kathleen Dy-Go, Ito Rapadas

Christian Bautista chronology
Captured (2008)	Romance Revisited: The Love Songs of Jose Mari Chan (2009)

Singles from Romance Revisited: The Love Songs of Jose Mari Chan
- 1. "Tell Me Your Name" Released: August 2009; 2. "Beautiful Girl" Released: November 2009; 3. "Please Be Careful with My Heart (with Sarah Geronimo)" Released: January 2010; 4. "Afraid for Love to Fade" Released: May 2010; 5. "I Remember the Girl"

Romance Revisited: The Love Songs of Jose Mari Chan is the fourth studio album by Filipino singer Christian Bautista, released in the Philippines on August 20, 2009, by Universal Records. The album consists of nineteen Jose Mari Chan-originals, including duets with Sarah Geronimo, Regine Velasquez, Lani Misalucha and Chan himself. It includes a limited edition 2010 photo calendar of Bautista. "Tell Me Your Name", Beautiful Girl", "Please Be Careful with My Heart", "Afraid for Love to Fade" and "I Remember the Girl" were released as singles.

To date, the album has been certified quadruple platinum by the Philippine Association of the Record Industry, selling 80, 000 units in the Philippines and double platinum by the Recording Industry of Indonesia. It has sold over 250,000 units in Asia.

== Track listing ==
All tracks were produced by Ito Rapadas.

No.	Title	Writer(s)	Arranger(s)	Length
1.	"Tell Me Your Name"	Cristina Tabora, Jose Mari Chan	Bobby Velasco	3:38
2.	"I Remember the Girl"	Chan	Velasco	3:39
3.	"Afraid for Love to Fade"	Chan	Fred Garcia	2:50
4.	"I Have Fallen in Love (With the Same Woman Three Times)"	Benigno Aquino Jr., Chan	Velasco	4:50
5.	"Please Be Careful with My Heart" (with Sarah Geronimo)	Chan	Velasco	3:33
6.	"My Girl My Woman My Friend" (with Regine Velasquez)	Chan	Garcia	4:31
7.	"Beautiful Girl"	Chan	Garcia	3:27
8.	"Can't We Start Over Again"	Tabora, Chan	Velasco	4:27
9.	"Be Gentle"	Cristina Ansaldo-Estrada, Chan	Velasco	3:05
10.	"Stay My Love"	Sunny Pulger-Raghunath, Chan	Velasco	4:42
11.	"Afterglow"	Chan	Garcia	3:07
12.	"A Love to Last a Lifetime"	Chan	Velasco	3:52
13.	"Here and Now" (with Lani Misalucha)	Chan	Velasco	3:52
14.	"Constant Change"	Chan	Garcia	2:53
15.	"Deep in My Heart"	Chan	Velasco	3:09
16.	"Refrain"	Chan	Velasco	4:14
17.	"Can We Just Stop and Talk a While"	Chan	Ito Rapadas	3:06
18.	"So I'll Go"	Chan	Alkemi Productions	3:01
19.	"A Heart's Journey" (with Jose Mari Chan)	Chan	Alan Smallwood	3:12

== Personnel ==
Credits were taken from Titik Pilipino.

- Alkemi Productions - arranger
- Christian Bautista - lead vocals, back-up vocals
- Jose Mari Chan - lead vocals (track 19)
- Nelson Cruz - hair stylist
- Dorothy Descalsota - back-up vocals
- Kathleen Dy-Go - executive producer
- Gian Espiritu - make-up
- Fred Garcia - arranger
- Sarah Geronimo - lead vocals (track 5)
- Gil Lozenada - recording
- Lani Misalucha - lead vocals (track 13)
- Mark Nicdao - photography
- Jay Saturnino D. Lumboy - album design and layout
- Ito Rapadas - producer, back-up vocals, back-up vocals arrangement, arranger
- Alan Smallwood - arranger
- Liz Uy - stylist
- Bobby Velasco - arranger
- Regine Velasquez - lead vocals (track 6)
- Willy Villa - recording, mixing, digital mastering
  - Mixed and digitally mastered at U.R. Recording Studio

== Certifications ==
Country	Provider	Certification	Sales
Indonesia	RII	2× Platinum	150,000+
Philippines	PARI	4× Platinum	80,000+
