= ASAP Music =

- You loved them on TV, You'll love them on CD!
- Parent company: ABS-CBN Corporation
- Founded: 2006
- Founder: ABS-CBN Entertainment Group
- Status: Inactive
- Distributor(s): Star Music
- Genre: Various
- Country of origin: Philippines

ASAP Music is the record label of ABS-CBN's variety show, ASAP. ASAP hosts collaborated for the first time to produce music on its debut release, the album Hotsilog. It is said that producing the ASAP album took over a year; the reason being that most of the hosts/performers were already signed with other major record labels.

== Albums ==
=== Hotsilog ===
Hotsilog

Compilation album by Various artists
- Released: October 8, 2006
- Label: ASAP Music

Professional ratings
Review scores
| Source | Rating |
|---|---|
| OPMusikahan | 4/5 stars |

Hotdog made a comeback on October 8, 2006 with their trademark "Manila sound" that was given a contemporary twist by ASAP 06's own stars in Hotsilog. Hotsilog, the pilot compilation album that signaled the show's foray into the recording field, presents Piolo Pascual, Rachelle Ann Go, Gary Valenciano, Zsa Zsa Padilla, Toni Gonzaga, Sam Milby, Nina among others, performing the band's hits such as the carrier single "Ikaw ang Miss Universe ng Buhay Ko", "Panaginip", "Manila", "I Can't Forget You", "Annie Batungbakal", "Langit Na Naman" and "Lumapit Ka". ASAP 06 became the first variety show in the country to produce its own album.

==== Track listing ====
1. "Manila" (Gary Valenciano)
2. "Annie Batungbakal" (Toni Gonzaga featuring Marcus)
3. "Pers Lab" (Sarah Geronimo)
4. "Ms. Universe" (Piolo Pascual)
5. "Panaginip" (Rachelle Ann Go)
6. "Bitin Sa Iyo" (Erik Santos)
7. "Bongga Ka Day" (Sheryn Regis)
8. "Beh Buti Nga" (Mark Bautista featuring Anne Curtis)
9. "Langit Na Naman" (Sam Milby)
10. "Kasi Naman" (Nikki Gil)
11. "O Lumapit Ka" (Nina)
12. "Ikaw Pa Rin" (Jed Madela)
13. "Dying to Tell You" (Christian Bautista)
14. "I Can't Forget You" (Zsa Zsa Padilla)

=== ASAP Ultimate Dance 4 Album ===
ASAP Ultimate Dance 4 Album

Compilation album by Various artists
- Released: February 18, 2007
- Label: ASAP Music

Dance to UD4's first dance album. The album contains 8 tracks and an instructional CD on how to do the "Kembot".

Tracks

1. "Kembot"
2. "UD4 Dance Break"
3. "Drop It"
4. "Tinikling"
5. "Disco Superstar"
6. "Panola"
7. "Take It Off"
8. "Superlicious Mama"

=== Sana Maulit Muli OST ===
Sana Maulit Muli OST

Soundtrack album by Various artists
- Released: February 27, 2007
- Label: ASAP Music

This is the official teleserye soundtrack of the TV series Sana Maulit Muli.

Tracks

1. "Sana Maulit Muli" (Gary Valenciano)
2. "Mine" (Kim Chiu)
3. "Umaasa Lang Sa 'Yo" (Six Part Invention)
4. "Hiling" (Frio)
5. "Isang Pangarap Lang" (True Faith)
6. "Kung Maibabalik Ko Lang" (Jay-R Siaboc)
7. "Matudnila" (Mark Bautista)
8. "Time After Time" (Panky Trinidad)
9. "Sana" (Breaking Silence)
10. "Maalaala Mo Sana" (Silent Sanctuary)

=== ASAP Supahdance Album ===
ASAP Supahdance Album

Compilation album by Various artists
- Released: September 30, 2007
- Label: ASAP Music

Tracks

1. "Supahdance Interlude"
2. "Dulce Tirah Tirah" (UD4)
3. "Boom Tiyaya Boom" (Vhong Navarro)
4. "Rockin Crazy" (Full Circle Teens)
5. "Stop N' Go" (Mickey Perz and Saicy Aguila)
6. "Real Man" (Vina Morales)
7. "Hip Hop Salsa" (Iya Villania)
8. "Dancing Naked" (Kitty Girls)
9. "Uhm Ahh Ahh" (Wowowee's ASF Dancers)
10. "Kembot (Christmas Remix)"
11. "Bump That Booty" (Gerald Anderson)
12. "Shake Yo Thang" (Gab Valenciano)
13. "Kokey (Dance Remix)" (Kokey Kids)
14. "Kembot (Christmas Dance Remix)" (UD4)

Videos

1. "Supahdance Interlude"
2. "Dulce Tirah Tirah" (UD4)
3. "Stop N' Go" (Mickey Perz and Saicy Aguila)
4. "Kokey (Dance Remix)" (Kokey Kids)

=== GV 25 ===
Tracks

Disc 1

1. "Narito" (Martin Nievera)
2. "Laughter All The Time" (South Border)
3. "Fool 'Til The End" (Aiza Seguerra)
4. "Paano" (Rachelle Ann Go)
5. "Ikaw Lamang" (Zsa Zsa Padilla)
6. "What More Can I Say" (Kyla)
7. "You Got Me Working" (Mark Bautista)
8. "Wait Forever" (Toni Gonzaga)
9. "Until Then" (Jed Madela)
10. "Each Passing Night" (Sam Milby)
11. "'Di Bale Na Lang" (Jericho Rosales)
12. "Eto Na Naman" (Randy Santiago)
13. "Look In Her Eyes" (Paolo Valenciano)

Disc 2

1. "Sana Maulit Muli" (Sharon Cuneta)
2. "How Did You Know" (Piolo Pascual)
3. "Kailangan Kita" (Sarah Geronimo)
4. "Gaya Ng Dati" (Erik Santos)
5. "'Wag Mo Na Sang Isipin" (Richard Poon)
6. "Reachin' Out" (Pops Fernandez)
7. "Letting Go" (Jamie Rivera)
8. "Break Me" (Christian Bautista)
9. "Take Me Out Of The Dark" (Bituin Escalante)
10. "Could You Be Messiah" (Kuh Ledesma)
11. "Natutulog Ba Ang Diyos" (Vina Morales)
12. "Pasko Na Sinta Ko" (Sheryn Regis)

=== SupahDance 2 ===
Tracks

1. "Dale Grande"
2. "Kitang-Kita"
3. "Do the Swagga"
4. "Move"
5. "Dulce Tirah Tirah (Remix)"

== Awards ==
- Compilation Awardee: 3rd ASAP Circle Awards (Hotsilog)
- Compilation Awardee: 3rd ASAP Circle Awards (UD4 Dance Album)

== See also ==
- ABS-CBN
- ASAP
