= Awit Para Sa'yo =

Awit Para Sa’yo

Studio album by Erik Santos
- Released: August 12, 2011
- Genres: Pop, Adult Contemporary, OPM
- Length: 1:02:43
- Languages: English, Tagalog
- Label: Star Music
- Producers: Annabelle M. Regalado (executive); Jonathan Manalo; Roque Santos

Erik Santos chronology
Erik Santos: The Jim Brickman Songbook (2009)	Awit Para Sa’yo (2011)	The Erik Santos Collection (2013)

Singles from Awit Para Sa’yo
- 1. "Kulang Ako Kung Wala Ka" Released: August 17, 2011

Awit Para Sa'yo is a studio album by Filipino singer Erik Santos, released on August 12, 2011 by Star Music in the Philippines in CD and cassette format and in digital download through iTunes and Amazon.com. It consists of twelve tracks including eight original OPM compositions and four OPM cover songs including Richard Reynoso's hit "Paminsan-minsan".

== Background ==
Awit Para Sa'yo also includes an original composition of Erik Santos called "Hanggang Kailan Kita Mamahalin". The carrier single is "Kulang Ako Kung Wala Ka" accompanied by a music video shot by Raymund Isaac. The song became number 1 upon release on Tambayan 101.9 FM Tambayan Top 10 and gain the number two spot on 90.7 FM Love Radio Top 10 Chart and Kwatro Kantos chart.

== Track listing ==
No.	Title	Writer(s)	Length
1.	"Kulang Ako Kung Wala Ka"	Soc Villanueva	4:31
2.	"Kailan Ka Magiging Akin"	Ogie Alcasid	3:53
3.	"Hindi Na Magbabago"	Christian Martinez	3:45
4.	"Bakit Mahal Pa Rin Kita"	Jonathan Manalo	4:30
5.	"Sana Ikaw"	Lucien Letaba, Rommel Tuico	4:14
6.	"Langit"	Jonathan Manalo	4:39
7.	"Mula Sa Araw Na Ito"	Ryan Cayabyab	4:54
8.	"Pangarap Ko Ang Ibigin Ka"	Ogie Alcasid	4:29
9.	"Di Lang Ikaw"	Aiza Seguerra, Juris Fernandez	4:56
10.	"Hanggang Kailan Kita Mamahalin"	Gary Valenciano, Erik Santos	5:04
11.	"If You Have To"	Jude Gitamondoc	4:56
12.	"Paminsan-minsan"	Aaron Paul Del Rosario	5:04
13.	"Sa Iyong Paglisan"	Arnold Reyes	4:44
14.	"Muling Buksan Ang Puso"	George Canseco	5:06

- Track 5 "Sana Ikaw" is originally by Piolo Pascual
- Track 8 "Pangarap Ko Ang Ibigin Ka" is originally by Regine Velasquez
- Track 9 "Di Lang Ikaw" is originally by Juris
- Track 12 "Paminsan-minsan" is originally by Richard Reynoso
- Track 14 "Muling Buksan Ang Puso" is originally by Basil Valdez

== See also ==
- Erik Santos discography
- List of best-selling albums in the Philippines
- Erik Santos Official Site
- Twitter of Awit Para Sa'yo
- Facebook of Awit Para Sa'yo
