= Captured (Christian Bautista album) =

Studio album by Christian Bautista
- Released: July 20, 2008
- Recorded: 2008
- Genre: Pop
- Length: 45:23
- Languages: English, Tagalog
- Label: Warner
- Producers: Jim Baluyut, Neil Gregorio

Christian Bautista chronology
Just a Love Song... Live! (2006)	Captured (2008)	Romance Revisited: The Love Songs of Jose Mari Chan (2009)

Singles from Captured
- 1. "The One Who Won My Heart" Released: July 25, 2008; 2. "Captured" Released: November 2008; 3. "Limutin Na Lang" Released: February 2009

Captured is the third studio album (fourth overall) by Filipino singer Christian Bautista, released in the Philippines on July 20, 2008, by Warner Music Philippines. The album consists of twelve tracks, including a duet with Sitti, which is also the title track. Its singles include "The One Who Won My Heart", "Captured", and "Limutin na Lang". The album has reached Platinum status by the Philippine Association of the Record Industry, selling over 30,000 units in the country.

== Background ==
After nearly two years since the release of his last album Just a Love Song... Live! in 2006, Christian Bautista started working on a new album, Captured. In a press release by Warner Music Philippines, Bautista explained:

I want these songs to capture your [fans] attention—your ears, your hearts, your minds, and your souls. I hope you listen to the lyrics and the melodies and try to read in between the lines. May these songs capture you as you've never been before.

For the first time since his debut in the Philippine music industry, he collaborated with other legendary male Filipino artists such as Martin Nievera and Ogie Alcasid, who wrote songs for the album. His brother, Joshua, also wrote a song, "Hope", for the album.

== Track listing ==
All tracks were produced by Neil Gregorio.

No.	Title	Writer(s)	Arranger(s)	Length
1.	"The One Who Won My Heart"	Nina Ossoff, Kathy Sommer, Doug Besterman	Alvin Nunez	3:45
2.	"Creation"	Fromm, Huston, Bottoms, Jamal	Nunez	4:27
3.	"Take a Ride"	Lambert Reyes, Jr.	Bobby Velasco	3:49
4.	"I Believe"	Acel Van Ommen	Nunez	3:56
5.	"Hope"	Joshua Bautista, Reyes	Nunez	3:52
6.	"Limutin na Lang"	Roy Edward Hizon, Reyes	Velasco	4:00
7.	"Just This Time"	Gil Hizon, Reyes		2:42
8.	"Nakalimutan Kong Sabihin"	Jimmy Borja	Nunez	3:47
9.	"Forever in Your Eyes"	Martin Nievera	Velasco	4:18
10.	"Could Have Been the One"	Ogie Alcasid	Nunez	3:49
11.	"Captured" (featuring Sitti)	Staci Frenes, Nate Sabin	Ferdie Marquez	3:37
12.	"I Want to Be the One"	Mike Shimshack	Marquez	3:21

== Personnel ==
Credits were taken from Titik Pilipino.

- Pam Arrieta (with Bluesub String Section) - violins and cello
- Jim Baluyut - executive producer
- Christian Bautista - lead vocals, back-up vocals
- Joseph De Vera - album cover layout
- Janette Dela Fuente - stylist
- Gian Espiritu - grooming
- Neil Gregorio - album producer, A&R administration, additional string section arrangement, vocal supervision, mastering and sequencing
- Arnie Mendaros - vocal supervision
- Noel Mendez - acoustic and electric guitars
- Carlo Orosa - vocal supervision
- Moy Ortiz - vocal supervision
- Aldwin Perez (with Bluesub String Section) - violins and cello
- Paolo Pineda - photography
- Angee Rozul - vocals, guitars and strings section recording, mixing
- Efren San Pedro - grand piano recording
- Sitti - lead vocals (track 11)
- Thor - vocal supervision
- Bobby Velasco - drums
- Zebedee Zuniga - vocal supervision

== Certifications ==
Country	Provider	Certification	Sales
Philippines	PARI	Platinum	30,000+
