= Completely (Christian Bautista album) =

Studio album by Christian Bautista
- Released: December 15, 2005
- Recorded: 2005
- Genre: Pop
- Length: 43:26
- Language: English, Tagalog
- Label: Warner
- Producer: Ricky R. Ilacad, Neil Gregorio

Christian Bautista chronology
Christian Bautista (2004)	Completely (2005)	Just a Love Song... Live! (2007)

Singles from Completely
- 1. "Everything You Do" Released: December 2005; 2. "Invincible" Released: 2006; 3. "She Could Be" Released: 2006; 4. "My Heart Has a Mind of Its Own" Released: 2006

Alternative covers
- Indonesia cover

Alternative cover
- Singapore cover

Completely is the second studio album of Filipino singer Christian Bautista, released on 15 December 2005 in the Philippines by Warner Music Philippines. Its singles include "Everything You Do", "Invincible", "She Could Be", and "My Heart Has a Mind of Its Own". Bautista wrote two songs for the album (a first time for the singer) —"Now That You Are Here" and "Please Don't Go". On January 30, 2006, he went to Indonesia to stage a concert, attend TV and radio guestings, and shoot music videos for "Since I Found You" and "For Everything I Am". In 2006, the album was certified Platinum by the Philippine Association of the Record Industry.

The album was released on digital download through iTunes and Amazon.com on January 16, 2007. American actor-singer Corbin Bleu covered the single "She Could Be" on his 2007 album, Another Side. To date, it has sold over 150,000 copies in Asia.

== Critical reception ==
Professional ratings
Review scores
Source	Rating
Titik Pilipino	4/5 stars

Completely received positive reviews from critics. Resty Odon of Titik Pilipino gave the album four out of five stars, explaining, "This album starts off with the regular ballads [...] It then shifts to an experimentation with more upbeat tunes". He added "This album boasts of having employed international songwriters [...] Christian also proves he can write a song or two ("Now That You Are Here", "Please Don’t Go") – another plus point". He praised the last number, "Nais Ko", stressing out the new side of Bautista that he called "louder, bolder, zippy". However, he disliked the upbeat numbers, saying "I think Christian’s almost one-dimensional pitch should stick to the ballads".

== Track listing ==
All tracks were produced by Neil Gregorio.

#	Title	Writer(s)	Length
1	"Everything You Do"	Marc Anthony, Andrew Fromm, Keith Follese	3:53
2	"I Can Love You Easy"	Fromm, Follese	3:45
3	"My Heart Has a Mind of Its Own"	Nina Ossoff, Tony Battaglia, Henry Gross	4:05
4	"Invincible"	Ossoff, Dana Calitri, Wild Pink	3:55
5	"She Could Be"	Arnie Roman, Fromm, Christopher Rojas	3:26
6	"Now That You Are Here"	Christian Bautista	3:24
7	"After You"	Mark Spiro, Steven Rosen	3:51
8	"Please Don't Go"	Bautista	3:16
9	"Since I Found You"	Andi Rianto, Seto Harjojudanto	3:53
10	"Completely"	Fromm, George Teren	3:56
11	"For Everything I Am"	Rianto, Sekar Ayu Asmara	3:50
12	"Nais Ko" (bonus track)	Ronald Marcelo	2:12

== Personnel ==
Credits were taken from Titik Pilipino.

- Christian Bautista - lead vocals, back-up vocals
- Rey Cortez - album cover layout
- GR Diaz - styling
- Gian Espiritu - grooming
- Chris Genuino - album cover layout
- Neil Gregorio - album producer, A&R administration, mastering and sequencing
- Ricky R. Ilacad - executive producer, A&R administration
- Paolo Pineda - photography
- Angeloe Villegas - arranger (track 12)
  - Mastered and sequenced at Chili Red Studio

== Certifications ==
Country	Provider	Certification	Sales
Philippines	PARI	Platinum	30,000+
Indonesia	RII	Platinum	90,000+

== Release history ==
Country	Release date	Format
Philippines	December 22, 2005	Standard (CD)
United States	January 16, 2007	Standard (digital download)
