= Dreamboy =

Fiction podcast by Night Vale Presents

Dreamboy is a podcast produced by Night Vale Presents.

== Background ==
The podcast contains original songs by Dane Terry. The podcast debuted on October 23, 2018. The podcast contains musical elements. The show contains content that is sexually explicit. The story is narrated by the protagonist, Dane Terry, who works at the Pepper Heights Zoo. The story is set in a fictional town in Ohio. The podcast debuted on October 23, 2018. Throughout the show it is unclear what is real and what is a dream making Dane an unreliable narrator. Sarah Griffin wrote in The Irish Times that the show is "poetic and moving ... [with] some of the finest soundscape work and music I've heard in the medium." The podcast was originally a play. The podcast was created by Dane Terry and Ellie Heyman with voices by Cecil Baldwin, Gianna Massi, Avery Draut, and Morgan Meadows.
