= OJ Mariano =

Filipino musician

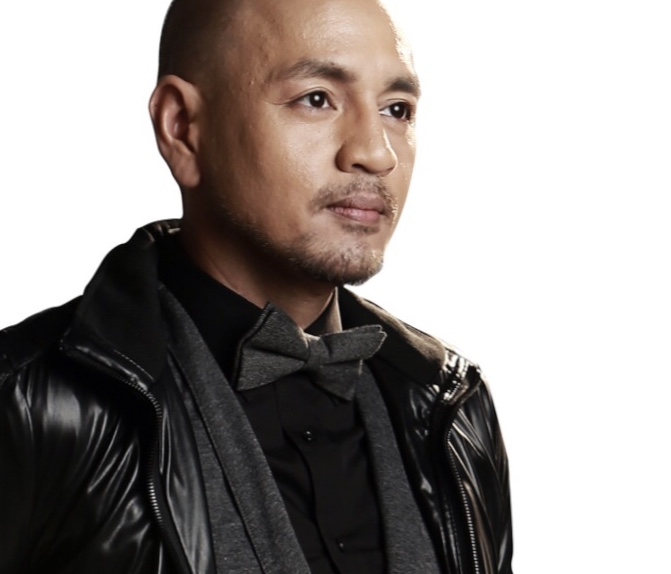
OJ Mariano

OJ Mariano (born 1979) is a Filipino singer and film/theater actor. He is the second runner-up of the second season of ABS-CBN's reality singing competition Star in a Million. After the competition, he released an album under Star Records entitled One Dream Come True. For his first album, he received Awit Awards' 2006 "Best New Male Recording Artist". He is previously performing as a singer in ABS-CBN's The Singing Bee.

He then pursued the theater and acting field, and was featured in a number of local and international Musical productions and films. He received various nominations and received the Gawad Buhay Award for Best Male Lead in Musical in 2013.

OJ is the current tenor of the Philippines’ top vocal group, The Company.

== Discography ==
=== Albums ===
- One Dream Come True
- Ballads

=== Singles ===
- "If Ever You're In My Arms Again" (from the album Ballads)
- "Sana'y Malaman Mo" (theme song of El Cuerpo)
- "Hanggang Dito Na Lang" (from Lobo original soundtrack)
- "Pangako Ko" (theme song of Maria de Jesus)
