= The Company (vocal group) =

Filipino vocal group

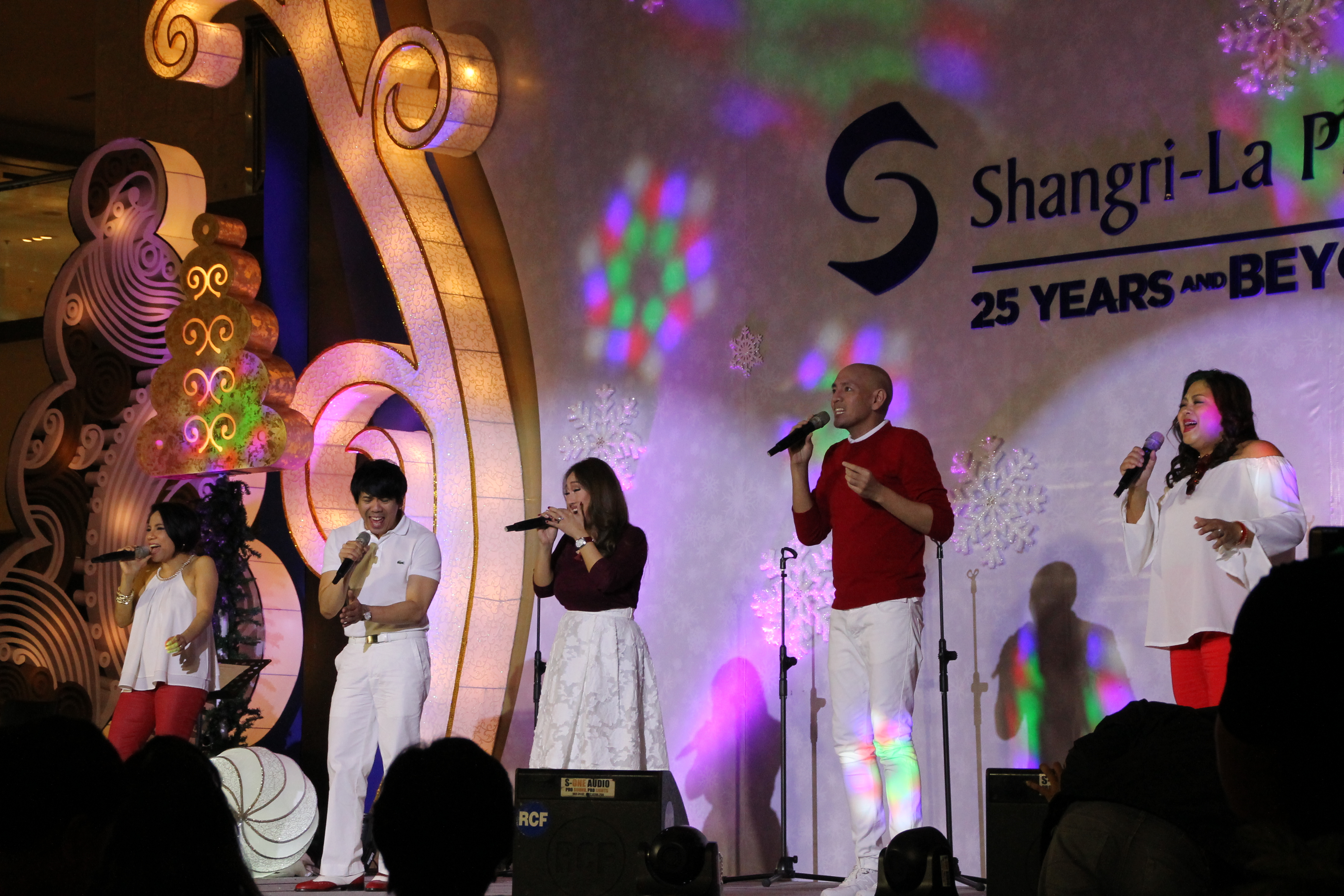
- The Company in 2016; L–R: Annie Quintos, Moy Ortiz, Sweet Plantado, OJ Mariano, Cecile Bautista

Background information
- Also known as: The Company Singers
- Origin: Philippines
- Genres: Vocal jazz, a cappella, pop music
- Years active: 1985–present
- Labels: Ivory Music and Video; Sony Music (formerly BMG Musiko Pilipinas); Viva Records; Universal Records; Star Music (2019–present)
- Members: Moy Ortiz; Annie Quintos-Uy; Sweet Plantado-Tiongson; OJ Mariano
- Past members: Kathleen "Kath" Ng; Joji Inocentes; Manny Eulalia; Malou Diaz; Tetet Tolentino; Max Aviola; Tom Calisterio; Bob Acot; Kelly Reyes; Reggie Reyes; Carol Menguito; Meus Bartolome-Kaveny; Mary Anne Morales; Febe Magbanua-Pantoja; Reuben Laurente; Andre Castillo; Jay Marquez; Cecile Bautista-Reynoso
- Website: www.thecompanysingers.com

The Company (stylized as The CompanY) is a Filipino vocal group since 1985. The current members are Moy Ortiz, Annie Quintos, Sweet Plantado and OJ Mariano.

== History ==
The CompanY is a Filipino vocal group originally formed by members of the 1981 and 1983 touring batches of the Ateneo College Glee Club (ACGC). The group was founded and directed by Moy Ortiz, who named it after Stephen Sondheim's musical Company. Unlike their choral background with the ACGC, The CompanY focused on contemporary jazz and a cappella music.

The group gained their first commercial success with the single "Everlasting Love", written by Ortiz, Luigi de Dios and Rina Caniza. In 1990, the ensemble - composed of Moy Ortiz, Annie Quintos, Tom Calisterio, Meus Bartolome, Arsenio Cruz, Kathleen Ng, Andre Castillo and Mary Anne Morales - released their debut album The CompanY: Eight by 8 under Universal Records.

In 1991, Reuben Laurente and Cecile Bautista joined the group, replacing Arsenio Cruz and Kathleen Ng. Their second album, "Yon Na" was released under Ivory Records. This period also marked the final performances of Tom Calisterio and Mary Anne Morales.

In 1992, The CompanY released their third album, Six by 6, which produced two hit singles - "Muntik na Kitang Minahal" (I Almost Loved You) and "Now That I Have You". Following this, Meus Bartolome left the group and was replaced by Febe Magbanua in 1993. That same year, the group performed alongside The Manhattan Transfer in a major concert at the Araneta Coliseum.

In 2001, Sweet Plantado joined The Company replacing Febe Magbanua and The CompanY released the album "Storybook" under Viva Records. In 2005, Reuben Laurente departed, and was succeeded by Jay Marquez, while Andre Castillo made his final appearance with the group in early 2006.

In 2014, OJ Mariano became the newest member, replacing Jay Marquez.

By 2019, Cecile Bautista made her final performance with the group, leaving The CompanY as a quartet consisting of OJ Mariano, Moy Ortiz, Sweet Plantado and Annie Quintos.

== Musical influence ==
Throughout their career, The CompanY developed a distinct sound influenced by a wide range of artists and vocal groups, including Pentatonix, The Manhattan Transfer, New York Voices, The Singers Unlimited, The Carpenters, The Swingles, Swing Out Sisters, Pizzicato Five, Burt Bacharach, Take 6, First Call, The 5th Dimension, Jimmy Webb, Paul Williams, The Corrs, and Destiny's Child.

== Members ==
The current members of The Company are:

The CompanY

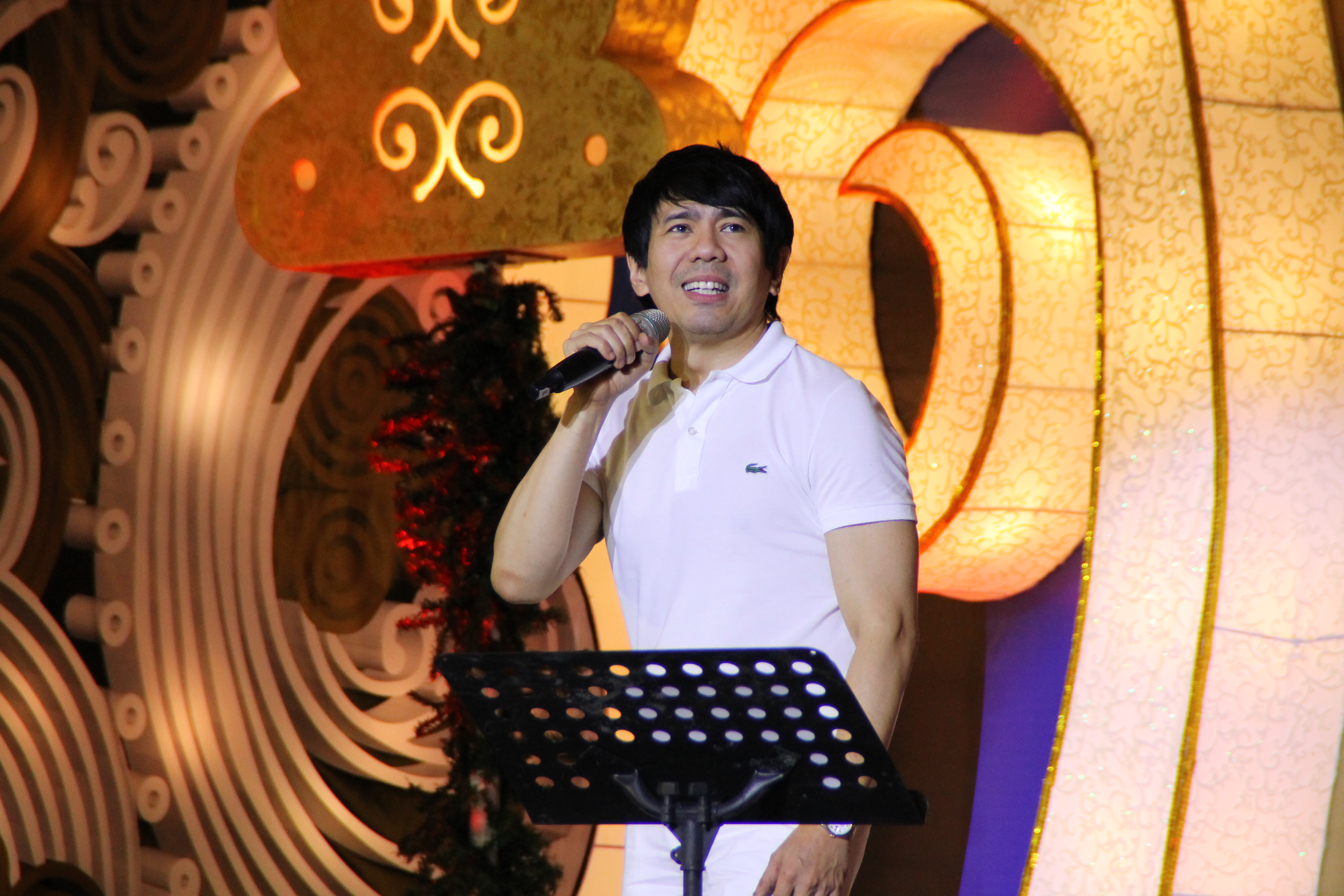
Moy Ortiz

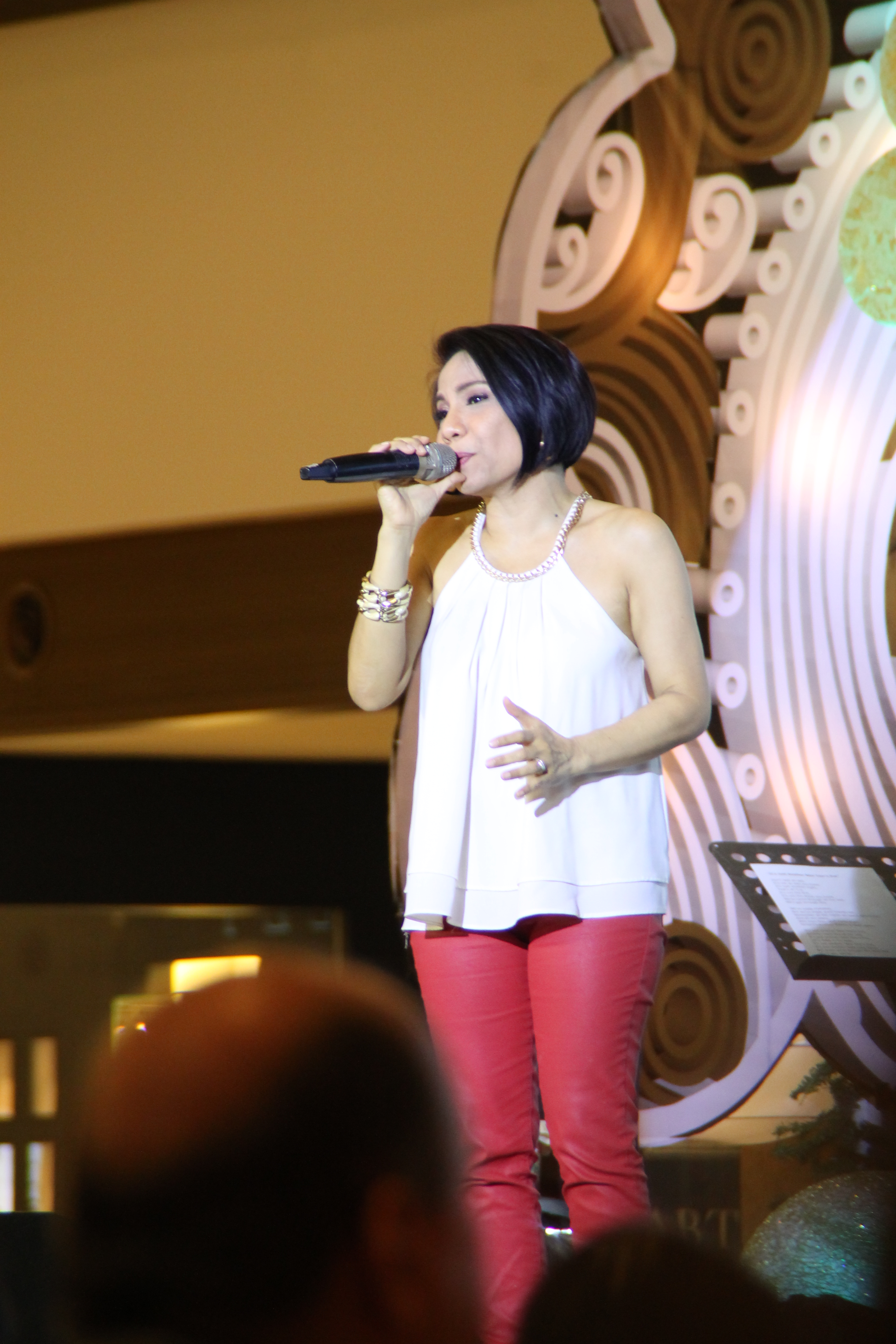
Annie Quintos

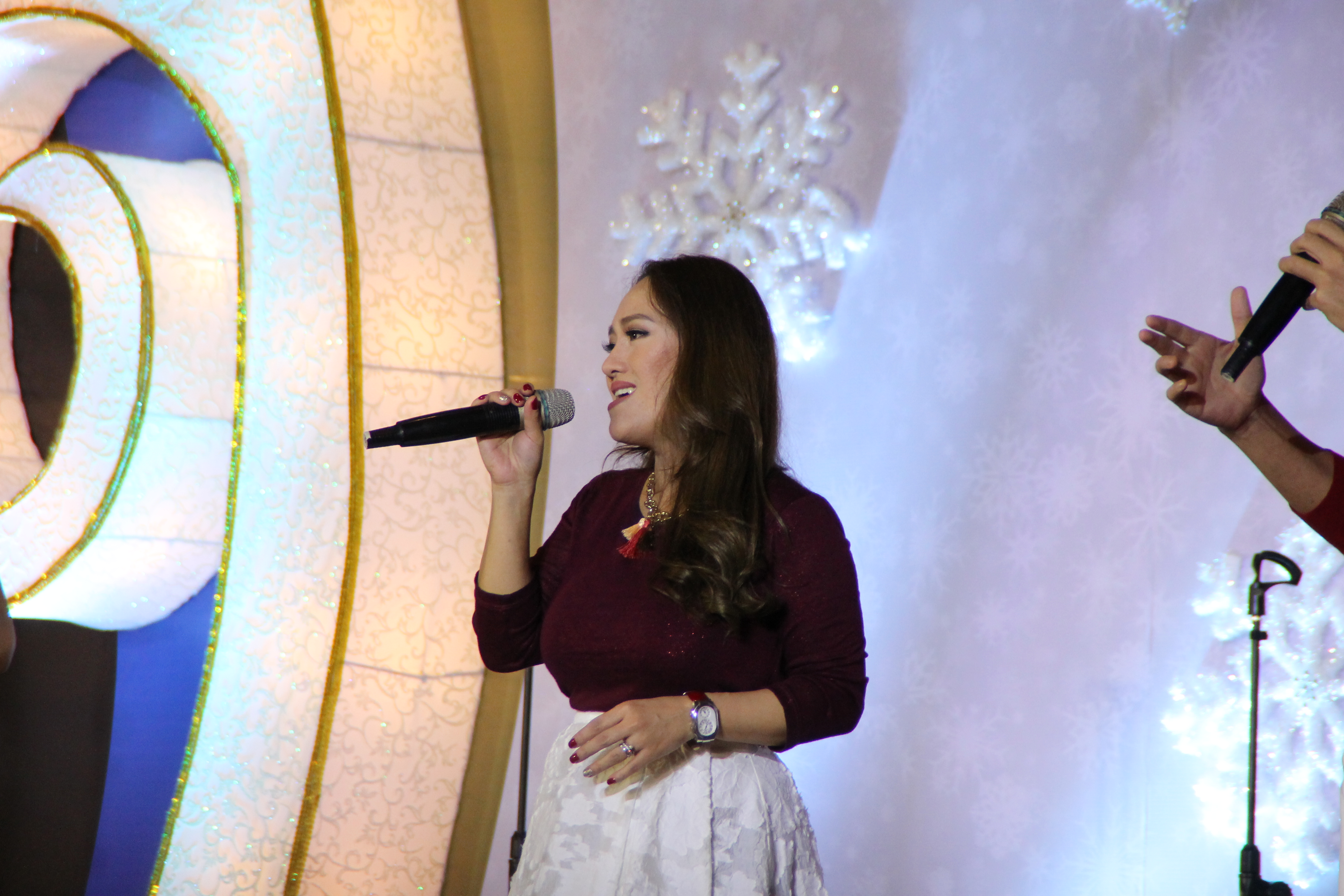
Sweet Plantado

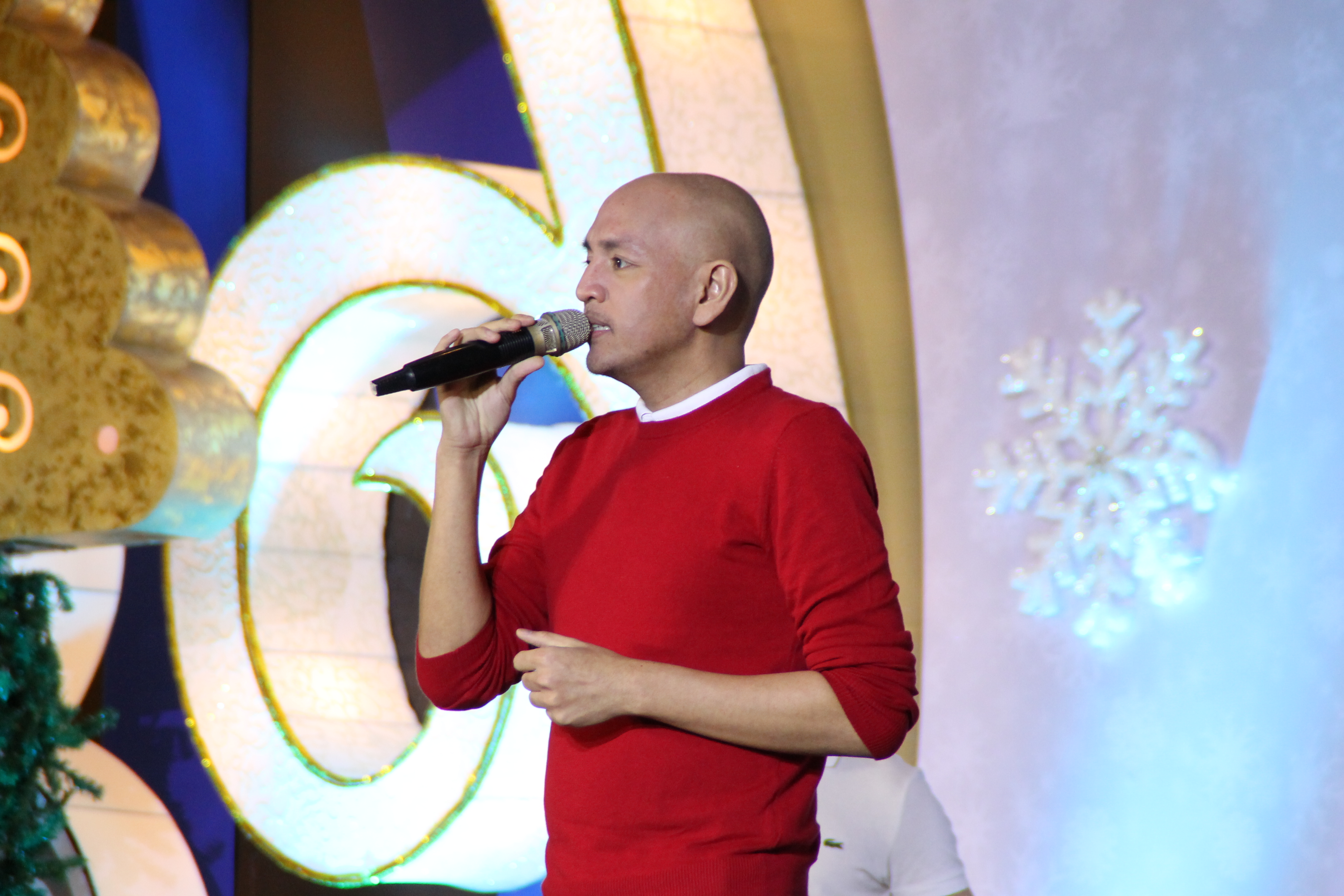
OJ Mariano

The founding members were:

- Moy Ortiz
- Annie Quintos
- Kathleen Ng
- Joji Inocentes
- Manny Eulalia
- Malou Diaz
- Tetet Tolentino
- Max Aviola
- Tom Calisterio
- Bob Acot
- Kelly Reyes
- Reggie Reyes
- Carol Menguito

Other former members include:

- Andre Castillo
- Arsenio Cruz
- Meus Bartolome-Kaveny
- Reuben Laurente
- Jay Marquez
- Mary Anne Morales
- Febe Magbanua-Pantoja
- Cecile Bautista

== Awards ==
=== Awit Awards ===
- 1991 - Best Performance by a new duo or group, "Everlasting Love"
- 1991 - Best Performance by a duo or group, "Everlasting Love"
- 1991 - Best Composition, "Everlasting Love"
- 1992 - Best Vocal Jazz Recording, "Ikaw Na Ikaw"
- 1992 - Best Inspirational Recording, "Hanggang sa Muli"
- 1992 - Album of the Year, Six by 6
- 1993 - Philip's International Award, "When the Feeling's Right"
- 1994 - Best Traditional Recording, "Kahit Ika'y Panaginip Lang"
- 1994 - Best Vocal Arrangement, "Kahit Ika'y Panaginip Lang"
- 1994 - Best Instrumental Arrangement, "Kanin, Ulam, Sabaw at Ikaw"
- 1995 - Best Instrumental Arrangement Accompanyinh Vocals, "Ihip ng Hangin"
- 1997 - Best Vocal Jazz Recording, "Bawal ang Goodbye"
- 1998 - Best Vocal Jazz Recording, "After You"
- 2002 - Best Duo/Group Recording, "Gusto Ko ng Acapella"
- 2008 - Best Vocal Arrangement, "Souvenirs" (Moy Ortiz)
- 2007 - Best Christmas Recording, "Noche Buena"
- 2007 - Best Vocal Arrangement, "The (Not So) Little Drummer Boy" (Moy Ortiz)
- 2013 - Best Collaboration, for "With a Little Help from My Friends", The CompanY and Tria Bascon
- 2013 - Best World Music Recording - "Pinoy Na Krismas"

== Discography ==
=== Albums ===
- 'The CompanY: Eight by 8 (1990)
- Yon Na! (1991)
- Six by 6 (1992)
- Christmas CompanY (1993)
- HarmonY (1994)
- For the Long Run (1995)
- STRETCH (1996)
- Greatest Hits (1997)
- RecycleDeluxe (1998)
- RecycleDeluxe II (1999)
- Storybook (2001)
- Greatest Hits . The Legend Series (2001)
- Live at the CCP! (2003)
- Mahal Kong Radyo (2004)
- The AnthologY. 20th Anniversary Celebration (2005)
- 2 in 1 Series (2006)
- The Christmas Album (2006)
- Sing Like a Champion (DVD, 2006)
- Destination Bossa (2007)
- Group Hug (with Gerard Salonga and FILharmoniKA, 2008)
- Lighthearted (2010)
- The Definitive Collection (2010)
- Lighthearted 2 (2012)
- Lighthearted OPM (2013)
- Lighthearted OPM 2 (2014)
- Nostalgia (2016)
- Nostalgia 2 (2017)
- Better Together (2017) - collaboration with The New Minstrels
- Gitna (2023)

=== Singles ===
- "The Lord's Prayer" - digital single (2018)
- "You Just Know It's Christmas" - digital single (2018)
- "Love is Love is Love" - digital single (2018)
- "'Sang Tawag Mo Lang" featuring Ryan Cayabyab - digital single (2019)
- "I-Boogie Mo Ako Baby" - The CompanY & The Itchyworms - digital single (2020)
- "I-Remix Mo Ako Baby" - The CompanY & The Itchyworms featuring The 123 Force, Moy Ortiz, DJ Soxialism, DJ M.O.D., Mumuy, Josh Evangelista (2020)
- "Prutas Pilipinas" featuring Ryan Cayabyab- 2020
