= Just a Love Song... Christian Bautista Live! =

Live album by Christian Bautista
- Released: January 24, 2007
- Recorded: 2006 at Teatrino, Greenhills
- Genre: Pop
- Length: 76:01 (Standard edition)
- Language: English
- Label: Warner
- Producer: Jim Baluyut, Neil C. Gregorio

Christian Bautista chronology
| Completely (2005) | Just a Love Song... Christian Bautista Live! (2007) | Captured (2008) |

Singles from Just a Love Song... Christian Bautista Live!
- 1. "Got to Believe in Magic" Released: March 2007; 2. "Trying to Get the Feeling Again" Released: May 2007

Alternative cover
- Christian Bautista Live! (Special Christmas Edition)

Just a Love Song... Christian Bautista Live! is the first live album by Filipino singer Christian Bautista, released on January 24, 2007, in the Philippines by Warner Music Philippines. The album is composed of nineteen cover versions of songs from the 1970s up to the 1990s. It was recorded overnight at Teatrino, Greenhills, backed by basic rhythm section, a grand piano and a string section, while being watched by an audience composing of specially invited fans. It was released both in the Philippines and Indonesia on CD and DVD formats. To date, the album has been certified gold by the Philippine Association of the Record Industry.

A "Special Christmas Edition" of the album was released in October 2007, with a new track list. Five additional Christmas songs were included plus the standard edition of the album.

== Background ==
Initially, Bautista refused to create a whole revival album, saying "I (Bautista) didn’t want to seem to be jumping on the bandwagon [...] it was time for me to offer something new at this point (for his fans)".

A brainstorming session was then made between him, his managers and his record label, after which the final list of tracks for the album was made.

== Reception ==
Commercially, Just a Love Song... Christian Bautista Live! is the weakest-selling album by Bautista. On March 11, 2007, the album was given a gold record award on ASAP '07 for selling more than 15,000 units in the Philippines.

Critically, the album received favorable reviews. Resty Odon of Titik Pilipino gave the album four out of five stars, stating "In this live recording, he works on romantic tunes and tries earnestly to tug at the memory's heartstrings". However, he disliked the fourth song, "Beautiful in My Eyes", and thought it was out of Bautista's upper register range. The review ended up with Odon, saying " All in all, though, this is a memorable recording for this artist and especially his fans.

== Track listing ==
All tracks were produced by Neil C. Gregorio.

Standard edition
| No. | Title | Length |
|---|---|---|
| 1. | "Trying to Get the Feeling Again" | 4:23 |
| 2. | "More Than You'll Ever Know" | 4:53 |
| 3. | "Only Reminds Me of You" | 3:47 |
| 4. | "Beautiful in My Eyes" | 4:13 |
| 5. | "Make It with You" | 3:30 |
| 6. | "Got to Believe in Magic" | 3:52 |
| 7. | "Fixing a Broken Heart" | 3:30 |
| 8. | "I Could Not Ask for More" | 3:51 |
| 9. | "Of All the Things" | 2:46 |
| 10. | "Nothing Can Stop Us Now" | 3:33 |
| 11. | "Be My Number Two" | 4:19 |
| 12. | "Finding Out the Hard Way" | 3:31 |
| 13. | "Blue Eyes Blue" | 4:33 |
| 14. | "Cry for Help" | 4:58 |
| 15. | "Heaven Help" | 3:02 |
| 16. | "I Won't Hold You Back" | 4:43 |
| 17. | "If Ever You're in My Arms Again" | 4:06 |
| 18. | "You" | 4:06 |
| 19. | "Just a Love Song" | 4:25 |

Professional ratings
Review scores
| Source | Rating |
|---|---|
| Titik Pilipino | 4/5 stars |
| OPMusikahan.com | 4.5/5 stars |

Disc 1: Special Christmas edition
| No. | Title | Length |
|---|---|---|
| 1. | "Pasko na Sinta Ko" |
| 2. | "I'll Be Home for Christmas" |
| 3. | "Grown-Up Christmas List" |
| 4. | "You're All I Want for Christmas" |
| 5. | "An Evening in December" |

Disc 2: Just a Love Song... Christian Bautista Live!
| No. | Title | Length |
|---|---|---|
| 1. | "Trying to Get the Feeling Again" | 4:23 |
| 2. | "More Than You'll Ever Know" | 4:53 |
| 3. | "Only Reminds Me of You" | 3:47 |
| 4. | "Beautiful in My Eyes" | 4:13 |
| 5. | "Make It with You" | 3:30 |
| 6. | "Got to Believe in Magic" | 3:52 |
| 7. | "Fixing a Broken Heart" | 3:30 |
| 8. | "I Could Not Ask for More" | 3:51 |
| 9. | "Of All the Things" | 2:46 |
| 10. | "Nothing Can Stop Us Now" | 3:33 |
| 11. | "Be My Number Two" | 4:19 |
| 12. | "Finding Out the Hard Way" | 3:31 |
| 13. | "Blue Eyes Blue" | 4:33 |
| 14. | "Cry for Help" | 4:58 |
| 15. | "Heaven Help" | 3:02 |
| 16. | "I Won't Hold You Back" | 4:43 |
| 17. | "If Ever You're in My Arms Again" | 4:06 |
| 18. | "You" | 4:06 |
| 19. | "Just a Love Song" | 4:25 |

== Personnel ==
Credits were taken from Titik Pilipino.

Production

- Jesy Alto - hair and make-up
- Jim Baluyut - executive producer, A&R administration
- Christian Bautista - additional song line-up
- Lachmi Baviera - additional song line-up
- Rey Cortez - album cover concept and layout
- Flerry De Leon - additional song line-up
- Dunkin' Donuts - food and drinks
- Gian Espiritu (of Essensuals) - grooming
- Audie Gemora - additional song line-up
- Neil C. Gregorio - album producer, A&R administration, mastering and sequencing
- Greenwich - food and drinks
- Mark Laccay - live recording
- Carlo Orosa - additional song line-up, creative consultant
- Steve Pagsanjan (of The Make up Studio) - hair and make-up
- Anne Poblador - additional song line-up
- Daniel Tan - photography
- Dante Tanedo - mixing
- Christopher Buenviaje - Additional Recording Engineer
- Ymaha - concert grand piano
- Frey Zambrano - additional song line-up, production coordinator

Musicians

- Pam Arrieta - cello
- Dexter Ayala - electric/fretless Bbass, back-up vocals
- Christian Bautista - lead vocals
- Hanche Bobis - grand piano
- Criss Buenviaje - acoustic/electric guitars, back-up vocals
- Marianne Ciervo - violin
- Leo Espocia - drums, back-up vocals
- Renee Francesca - violin
- Aldwin Perez - violin
- Mary Ann Policarpio - viola
- Rico Sobrevinas - saxophone, flute, back-up vocals

Recording locations

- Teatrino (Greenhills, Manila, Philippines) - live recording
- Chili Red Studio - mastering and sequencing

== Certifications ==
| Country | Provider | Certification | Sales |
|---|---|---|---|
| Philippines | PARI | Gold | 15,000 |
