= Christian Bautista (album) =

2004 studio album by Christian Bautista

Studio album by Christian Bautista
- Released: March 26, 2004 (Philippines); September 28, 2004 (Indonesia, Malaysia, Singapore, Thailand and Brunei)
- Recorded: December 2003–February 2004
- Genre: Pop
- Length: 41:47 (Standard edition); 58:24 (Limited edition)
- Label: Warner Music Philippines
- Producer: Ricky R. Ilacad; Neil C. Gregorio

Christian Bautista chronology
Christian Bautista (2004)	Completely (2005)

Singles from Christian Bautista
- 1. "The Way You Look at Me" Released: 3 May 2004; 2. "Kailan Pa Ma'y Ikaw" Released: 8 October 2004; 3. "Ang Tangi Kong Kasama" Released: 29 December 2004; 4. "So It's You" Released: 10 February 2005; 5. "Hands to Heaven" Released: 5 April 2005; 6. "Kelan Kaya" Released: 6 May 2005; 7. "Miracle (featuring Nina)" Released: 12 July 2005; 8. "Colour Everywhere" Released: 5 September 2005

Alternative cover
- Indonesia cover

Christian Bautista is the debut album by Filipino singer Christian Bautista, released in the Philippines on March 26, 2004 by Warner Music Philippines. Its singles include "The Way You Look at Me", "Hands to Heaven", "Colour Everywhere", "Kailan Pa Ma'y Ikaw" and "Kelan Kaya". To date, the album has reached 4× platinum status by the Philippine Association of the Record Industry (PARI), selling over 120,000 units in the country. It has also been certified in other Southeast Asian countries, such as Indonesia and Thailand.

The album was released as a digital download through iTunes and Amazon.com on 25 September 2004. It has sold more than 400,000 copies all over Asia.

== Background ==
After his stint as a contestant on ABS-CBN's Star in a Million talent contest where he became the fourth runner-up, Bautista signed an album contract with Warner Music Philippines. He then released his self-titled debut album, with "The Way You Look at Me" as its first single, written by Andrew Fromm and Keith Follese and originally recorded by Judith Lefeber.

The album had significant radio airplay in other Southeast Asian countries such as Indonesia, Thailand, Malaysia and Singapore.

== Reception ==
Professional ratings
Review scores
Source	Rating
Titik Pilipino	3/5 stars

The album sold overwhelmingly well. It was 4× platinum in the Philippines and 2× platinum in Indonesia. Furthermore, it became popular in other parts of Southeast Asia, namely Thailand and Malaysia. Despite over-performing commercially, the album received mixed reviews from OPM critics. Ginnie Faustino-Galgana of Titik Pilipino gave the album three out of five stars, stating "He is a face with a voice. It's easy to imagine girls swooning over Christian. If he could act, he can do a Piolo Pascual". However, she felt the lack of heart on Bautista's deliverance, saying "He can hit the notes and his delivery is pretty clear, but more emotion is needed [...] He may want to croon, rather than just sing the words". She ended the review unsatisfied, saying "A little more practice will get him that oomph".

== Re-release ==
A limited edition of the album was released, consisting of a two-CD set package. The first disc consists of the original tracks from the original edition of the album plus four additional songs—"You and Me (We Wanted It All)" with Rachelle Ann Go, "So It's You", "Say That You Love Me", and "I Will Be What I Believe". The second disc is in VCD format, consisting of six music videos.

=== Critical response ===
Titik Pilipino gave another review for the re-release of Christian Bautista. Resty Odon gave the album a perfect rating (five out of five stars), stating "The good news is, the addition of these four numbers gives Christian the chance to further prove that he can hold his own in the ballads department". He compared Bautista as better than Josh Groban, when it comes to pop numbers. He also praised the vocal performance of Bautista on the four new songs, saying "Fans of Christian Bautista [...] will be thrilled just the same to find Christian belting it out in four new songs in his own unique style, including a duet with the golden-voiced Rachelle Ann Go.

== Track listing ==
All tracks were produced by Neil C. Gregorio.

=== Standard edition ===
1. "The Way You Look at Me" (Keith Follese, Andrew Fromm) – 3:27
2. "Colour Everywhere" (Guy Roche, Shelly Peiken) – 4:12
3. "Kailan Pa Ma'y Ikaw" (Tito C. Cayamada) – 3:58
4. "Away from You" (Boy Katindig) – 4:18
5. "Kelan Kaya" (Emil Pama) – 4:32
6. "Hands to Heaven" (David Glasper, Marcus Lilington) – 4:07
7. "Ang Tangi Kong Kasama" (Cayamada, Jerry Butiong) – 4:09
8. "Miracle" (featuring Nina) (Mike Luis) – 4:06
9. "The Way You Look at Me" (acoustic) (Follese, Fromm) – 3:27
10. "I Don't Want to See You Cry Again" (Jungee Marcelo, Soc Villanueva) – 5:31

=== Limited edition ===
Bonus tracks

1. "You and Me (We Wanted It All)" (with Rachelle Ann Go) (Peter Allen, Carol Bayer-Sager) – 4:32
2. "So It's You" (Cecille Azarcon) – 3:42
3. "Say That You Love Me" (Louie Ocampo, Alan Ayque) – 4:51
4. "I Will Be What I Believe" (Ferdinand Dimadura) – 3:32

Bonus VCD

1. "The Way You Look at Me" (music video)
2. "Hands to Heaven" (music video)
3. "Colour Everywhere" (music video)
4. "Kailan Pa Ma'y Ikaw" (music video)
5. "You and Me (We Wanted It All)" (with Rachelle Ann Go) (music video)
6. "So It's You" (music video)

OTHERS

1. "To Have and to Hold" (with Sitti) (Claudine Barreto and Raymart Santiago's wedding)

== Personnel ==
Credits were taken from Titik Pilipino.

- Christian Bautista - lead vocals, back-up vocals
- Rey Cortez (of WMP Creative) - album cover art
- Tom Epperson - photography
- Mon Faustino - arranger
- Keith Follese - arranger
- Andrew Fromm - arranger
- Chris Genuino (of WMP Creative) - album cover art
- Neil C. Gregorio - album producer, A&R administration, mastering and sequencing
- Ricky R. Ilacad - executive producer, A&R administration
- Mike Luis - vocal coach, arranger
- Ferdie Marquez - arranger
- Nina - lead vocals (track 8)
- Alvin Nunez - arranger
- Anne Poblador - styling
- Frey Zambrano - production coordinator
- Paolo Zarate - arranger
- Zeebedee Zuniga - vocal coach
  - Mastering and sequencing at Warner Chili Red Studio

== Certifications ==
Country	Provider	Certification	Sales
Philippines	PARI	4× platinum	120,000+
Indonesia	RII	2× platinum	180,000+

== Release history ==
Region	Release date	Edition
Philippines	28 September 2004	Standard (CD)
Philippines	2005	Limited edition (CD + bonus tracks + VCD)
Indonesia and United States	5 October 2004	Standard (digital download)
