= Christian Bautista =

Filipino singer, dancer, model, and TV host (born 1979)

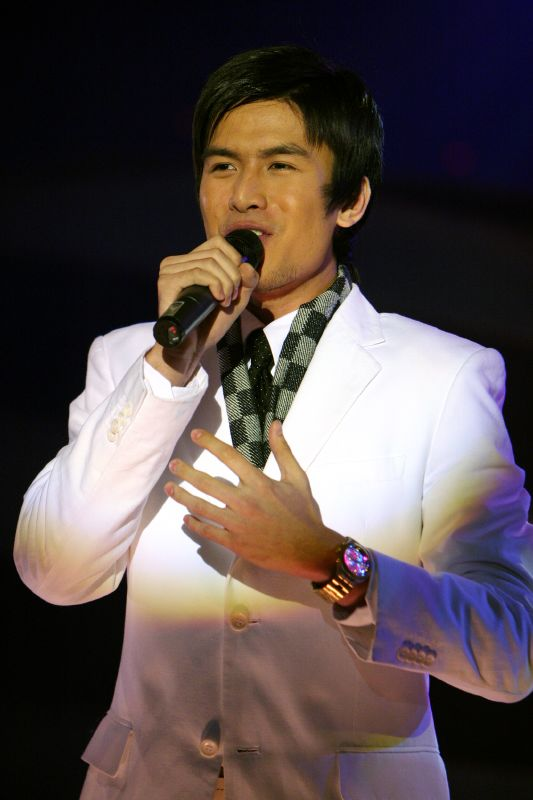
- Bautista in 2007
- Born: Christian Joseph Morata Bautista; October 19, 1981 (age 45); Imus, Philippines
- Occupations: Singer; dancer; model; TV host
- Years active: 2003–present
- Agents: ABS-CBN (2003–2013); GMA Network (2013–present); NYMA (2023–present)
- Works: See discography
- Spouse: Kat Ramnani (m. 2018)
- Musical career
- Genres: OPM; P-pop
- Instrument: Vocals
- Labels: Warner Music Philippines (2003–2009); Universal Records (2009–2025); Sony Music Philippines (2025–present)
- Website: christianbautistaonline.com

Christian Joseph Morata Bautista (born October 19, 1981) is a Filipino singer, dancer, model, and TV host. He was a finalist of Star in a Million, a Philippine reality show aired on ABS-CBN channel, winning 4th place in the competition in 2003. After the contest, he signed a recording contract with Warner Music Philippines and released his debut album, Christian Bautista. The multiplatinum album established his name as an OPM artist with notable songs such as "The Way You Look at Me" and "Hands to Heaven". The singer, dubbed "Asia's Romantic Balladeer", gained popularity not only in the Philippines but in other countries in Southeast Asia such as Indonesia, Singapore, Malaysia and Thailand. He is currently an exclusive talent of GMA Network.

Bautista has also collaborated with fellow Filipino singers Nina, Sitti, Rachelle Ann Go, Sarah Geronimo, Sheryn Regis, Erik Santos and Mark Bautista and once with Indonesian recording artist Bunga Citra Lestari performing "Tetaplah Di Hatiku", the Indonesian version of Please Be Careful with My Heart following his success in Indonesia. Prior to his transfer to GMA Network, he regularly appeared in ABS-CBN's variety show ASAP.

Bautista shot The Kitchen Musical with fellow Stages talent Karylle and other Asian and Filipino talents in Singapore.

After being with ABS-CBN for 10 years, Bautista transferred to GMA Network and signed a three-year exclusive contract on March 20, 2013.

Bautista renewed his contract with GMA Network on July 28, 2021.

== Life and music career ==
=== Childhood and youth ===
Bautista was born in Imus, Cavite, on October 19, 1981. He is the eldest of three siblings, sons of Josefa Rizalina and Ebert Bautista. He was a choir member in their church since he was seven years old.

Bautista studied grade school and high school at International Christian Academy in Sucat, Paranaque, which also hailed other Filipino actors such as Ryan Eigenmann, Geoff Eigenmann, Rico Yan and Billy Joe Crawford. He then took up landscape architecture at the University of the Philippines Diliman, graduating with a Bachelor of Arts degree. He was a table tennis varsity player during college before focusing on singing and entering showbiz.

=== 2003–2004: Star in a Million and self-titled album ===
Bautista gained popularity after becoming the first grand finalist on ABS-CBN's reality singing competition Star in a Million. Though placing only fourth overall, he quickly become one of the most popular contestants, and was offered a recording contract with Warner Music Philippines shortly after he was eliminated from the show. He released the single "The Way You Look at Me", in 2004 from his self-titled album.

Christian Bautista's "The Way You Look at Me"
30-second sample of Christian Bautista's first single taken from his debut album Christian Bautista

The song, penned by American composers Andrew Fromm and Keith Follese, received frequent airplay in Indonesian radio stations and Bautista became an instant hit overseas that record label Warner Indonesia decided to bring him there to perform for his growing Indonesian fanbase.

=== 2005: Completely ===
Completely, Christian Bautista's second album, received a Platinum Record Award on its first week of release in the Philippines. The album spawned the singles "Everything You Do", "Invincible", and "She Could Be", a song which was later covered by Corbin Bleu of High School Musical fame. Completely has also reached platinum status in Indonesia.

A special edition of the album Completely, which combines Christian's English songs from his debut and second albums, was later launched in Singapore where "The Way You Look at Me" also topped local charts.

In 2005, RCTI aired a musical special entitled Completely: Christian Bautista where he performed with Indonesian artists 40-piece Magenta Orchestra, Andi Rianto, Krisdayanti and Titi DJ. In the same year, Bautista was cast as one of the leads in Kampanerang Kuba, a musical fantasy television series broadcast by ABS-CBN.

Locally, he had endorsed brands such as Bench clothing and body spray, St. Augustine School of Nursing, Smart Communications, Greenwich Pizza, Trumpets Musicademy, Bed Head products, Skechers, and Swatch watches.

=== 2006–2007: Just a Love Song...Live! and Inspired Tour ===
Bautista released his third major album, Just a Love Song... Christian Bautista Live! in 2006 also under the Warner Music Philippines. The album, the first live album by the singer, is mainly composed of covers of different old-time hit love songs and was recorded live in a Teatrino Bar in Greenhills with a small number of audience, which are mostly specially invited fans of the singer. Follow up to the success of the live album was the release of his very first live DVD under the same title in early 2007.

Bautista debuts as an actor on the big screen in Regal Entertainment's 2006 Metro Manila Film Festival entry Mano Po 5: Gua Ai Di. In this film directed by Joel Lamangan and written by Abi Lam-Parayno, Dode Cruz and Andrew Paredes, Christian plays Timothy a.k.a. Felix Yan, an Asian pop star, providing support to the bankable love team of Angel Locsin and Richard Gutierrez. The single "My Heart Has A Mind of Its Own" from "Completely" is used as one of the film's soundtrack.

He launched a four-city tour in Indonesia on January 26 to February 2, 2007. The tour included visits in Jakarta, Makassar, Surabaya, and Bandung.

In October 2007, he embarked a concert tour, Inspired, a one-night show in the Cuneta Astrodome with guest appearances by Gary Valenciano, Tricia Amper Jimenez, Joni Villanueva and Sam Milby.

He collaborated with Rachelle Ann Go on the song "Pag-ibig Na Kaya?", a Filipino version of "Perhaps Love" (originally sung by Howl & J), that was used in the Koreanovela Princess Hours, aired on ABS-CBN.

Bautista re-released Just a Love Song...Live including a CD of different Christmas songs.

=== 2008: West Side Story and Captured ===
Bautista was included in the Valentine Concert on February 13, 2007, Ol 4 Luv, which was held at the Araneta Coliseum with Rachelle Ann Go, Erik Santos and Sarah Geronimo.

Bautista's live album, Just a Love Song...Live!, sold close to Double Platinum following the release of the repackaged Christmas edition containing his rendition of Gary Valenciano's "Pasko Na Sinta Ko" as well as other Christmas songs.

A musical talk show starring Bautista, The Christian Bautista Show, also aired on the Makisig Network. Bautista also won the award for Favorite Musical Artist Act at the first Nickelodeon Kids Choice Awards Philippines, held in 2008.

Bautista has also participated in musical theatre. In 2008, he was cast by STAGES in the lead role of Tony in the Philippine production of West Side Story, staged at the Meralco Theater from September to October 2008. The production also featured Karylle as one of the actresses portraying Maria.

In July 2008, Bautista's third studio album Captured was released. The album features bossa nova singer Sitti.

=== 2009: Romance Revisited ===
Early 2009, Bautista released his last single for Captured, "Limutin Na Lang", which featured a music video containing compilation of his videos and pictures from his past albums/album tours.

In 2009, Bautista released his very first compilation, The Platinum Collection. It would be his last album released under Warner Music Philippines.

By early August 2009, Bautista had transferred to Universal Records. His first project under the recording label featured 19 tracks and songs originally performed by the legendary Jose Mari Chan. The album, Romance Revisited, rose to the top of the charts immediately after its release. Bautista performed several duets in the album, with popular pop stars Sarah Geronimo, Lani Misalucha and Regine Velasquez who early in her career also collaborated with Chan.

In November 2009, Bautista was a guest at Sarah Geronimo's Record Breaker Concert where they sang their duet "Please Be Careful with My Heart".

=== 2010: Dahsyat and A Wonderful Christmas ===
In February 2010, Bautista appeared again in Dahsyat, an Indonesian variety show from RCTI in Jakarta, where he performed a duet with Indonesian singer Bunga Citra Lestari with an Indonesian version of "Please Be Careful with My Heart".

In November 2010, Bautista released his seventh overall album and first Christmas album under Universal Records, titled A Wonderful Christmas. On December 2, 2011, the album was certified Diamond by PARI.

=== 2011: Outbound ===
Bautista released his fifth studio album and seventh overall album, Outbound, in 2011. He also joined the cast of a musical drama series, Kitchen Musical, with Karylle, Thou Reyes, Art Acuna.

=== 2012 ===
During the first quarter of the year, the First Class: Outbound Expanded Edition album was launched. Together with Karylle, they received top billing at the Love & Laughter concert at the Resorts World on February 29. Bautista remained active on Kitchen Musical for the 2012 season. In the third quarter of 2012, he was part of 10th anniversary special of The Way You Look at Me that celebrated his 10-year in the industry. Bautista was also featured on the series Princess and I, which aired on ABS-CBN during 2012. Bautista's sixth studio album, and eighth full-length X-Plus was released in October 2012.

=== 2013–present ===
In March 2013, Christian Bautista signed a three-year exclusive contract with GMA Network after months of rumors. He performed for the first time on Party Pilipinas on March 24, 2013, also marking the third anniversary of the show.

On September 20, 2023, Bautista performed in a duet with Bunga Citra Lestari at Jakarta's Hotel Mulia. It was assisted by symphony orchestra Twilite with its conductor Addie MS.

In 2023, Bautista joined talent agency NYMA.

In 2026, Bautista released "Sa'yo Lamang", a Filipino adaptation of "Bersamamu" by Bruneian singer Jaz.

The same year, Bautista joined Erik Santos and Jona for the Threelogy 3.0 concert tour, which included performances in Canada and the United States.

== Personal life ==
Bautista married his girlfriend, Kat Ramnani on November 17, 2018 at Tirtha Uluwatilu in Bali, Indonesia. The couple first met at a local award show but the two did not know each other. They started dating 5 years later. The couple celebrated their 6th wedding anniversary in 2024.

== Theater ==
Trumpet's production of The Lion, The Witch & The Wardrobe was Bautista's first big break. He earned raves from critics for his acting debut.

Year	Show	Role
2002	The Lion, The Witch & The Wardrobe	
2002	Joseph The Dreamer	
2008	West Side Story	Tony Wyzek
2012	Rama Hari	Rama
2013	Cinderella	Prince Charming
2014	Ghost: The Musical	Sam Wheat

== Discography ==
- 2004: Christian Bautista
- 2005: Completely
- 2008: Captured
- 2009: Romance Revisited: The Love Songs of Jose Mari Chan
- 2010: A Wonderful Christmas
- 2011: Outbound
- 2012: First Class: Outbound Expanded Edition
- 2012: X-Plus
- 2014: Soundtrack
- 2017: Kapit

== Filmography ==
=== Television ===
Year	Title	Role	Notes
2003	Star in a Million	Himself	3rd runner-up to Grand Champion Erik Santos
2004	ASAP	Himself	2004–2013
2004	Sarah the Teen Princess	Christian Leynes	Guest Role
2005	Kampanerang Kuba	Lorenzo	Main role
2006	Your Song	Michael	Episode "If You Walk Away"
2006	Mano Po 5: Gua Ai Di (I Love You)	Timothy/Felix Yan	Feature film
2008	The Christian Bautista Show	Himself	Host
2009	Your Song Presents: Feb-ibig	Arnold	Episode "I'll Never Get Over You, Getting Over Me"
2009	Kimmy Dora	Waiter	Feature film, cameo
2010	Kulilits	Himself	Guest star (1 episode)
2010	Take Me Out (Indonesia)	Himself	Guest star (1 episode)
2010	Your Song Presents: Beautiful Girl	James	Main role
2011	Star Power	Himself	Co-host
2011	A Special Symphony	Jayden	August (Philippines); Awaiting Release (Indonesia)
2011–2012	The Kitchen Musical	Daniel Ray	Lead Role
2012	Princess and I	Priam	Special Participation/Antagonist
2013	Party Pilipinas	Himself	Regular Member
2013	With a Smile	Aston Martinez	Lead Role
2013–2015	Sunday All Stars	Himself	Performer
2014	Strawberry Lane	Richard Tolentino	Supporting Role
2015	My Mother's Secret	Anton Guevarra	
2015	To the Top	Himself	Host
2016	Eat Bulaga!	Himself/Performer	First Time one contestant split-screen duet from Just Duet.
2016	Encantadia	Apitong	
2016	Lip Sync Battle Philippines	Himself/Performer	with Mark Bautista
2016	Superstar Duets	Himself	Judge
2017	My Love from the Star	Winston Libredo	
2018–present	The Clash	Himself/Judge	with Lani Misalucha
2018	Pamilya Roces	Ralph Gomez	
2018–2019	Studio 7	Himself	Host/Performer
2020–present	All-Out Sundays	Himself	Co-host/Performer
2021	Still	Nikolas	
2023–present	It's Showtime	Himself	Guest Performer
2026	Code Gray	Dr. Jett	
2026	Born to Shine		

== Awards and nominations ==
Year	Award giving body	Category	Nominated work	Results
2006	MTV Pilipinas Music Awards	Favorite Male in a Video	"Invincible"	Won
2006	MYX Music Awards	Favorite Collaboration	"Burn" with Nina	Won
2006	MYX Music Awards	Favorite Male Artist	—N/a	Nominated
2007	MYX Music Awards	Favorite Music Video	"Invincible"	Won
2007	MYX Music Awards	Favorite Mellow Video	"Invincible"	Won
2007	MYX Music Awards	Favorite MYX Live Performance	—N/a	Won
2007	MYX Music Awards	Favorite Male Artist	—N/a	Nominated
2008	Awit Awards	Best Performance by a Duet	"Unsaid" with Lala	Nominated
2008	MYX Music Awards	Favorite Collaboration	"Pag-Ibig na Kaya" with Rachelle Ann Go	Won
2008	MYX Music Awards	Favorite Male Artist	—N/a	Nominated
2011	GMMSF Box-Office Entertainment Awards	Male Recording Artist of the Year	—N/a	Won
2012	GMMSF Box-Office Entertainment Awards	Male Recording Artist of the Year	—N/a	Won
2013	GMMSF Box-Office Entertainment Awards	Male Recording Artist of the Year	—N/a	Won
2014	GMMSF Box-Office Entertainment Awards	Male Recording Artist of the Year	—N/a	Won
2019	PMPC Star Awards for Music	Male Recording Artist of the Year	"Aking Mahal"	Won
2022	PMPC Star Awards for Music	Male Recording Artist of the Year	"Bukas Wala Nang Ulan"	Won
