= List of awards and nominations received by Nina =

Nina awards and nominations
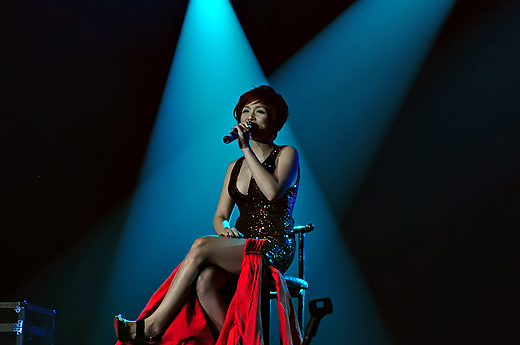
- Nina performing at the 2009 ASAP Sessionistas Live in Cebu City.
Awards and nominations
Award	Wins	Nominations
Awit Awards	10	31
Aliw Awards	2	15
GMMSF Box-Office Entertainment Awards	1	3
PMPC Star Awards for Music	1	14
MTV Pilipinas Music Awards	1	6
Myx Music Awards	2	7
Philippine Hip-Hop Music Awards	1	2

Totals (Note: Certain award groups do not simply award one winner. They acknowledge several different recipients, have runners-up, and have third place. Since this is a specific recognition and is different from losing an award, runner-up mentions are considered wins in this award tally. For simplification and to avoid errors, each award in this list has been presumed to have had a prior nomination.)
- Wins: 48
- Nominations: 119

Filipina singer Nina has received and collected many honors and awards throughout her career. Four of her major achievements include: Wave 89.1 Urban Music Awards' Special Achievement Award, ASAP Platinum Circle Awards' Elite Platinum Circle Award, Awit Award and MTV Pilipinas Music Award for Favorite New Artist. Throughout her career, she has won ten Awit Awards, two Aliw Awards, two Myx Music Awards and one PMPC Star Award for Music among numerous others. Domestically, she was named as the best-selling female recording artist of 2009 by the Box Office Entertainment Awards with accumulated 100,000 record sales for the year.

Her album Nina Live! is the fourth best-selling certified album, best-selling live album and best-selling album of the 2000s in the Philippines, making Nina the third artist, first female, to receive a diamond certification by the PARI. She has spent a total of 37 weeks at the number-one position in Philippine charts from 2003 to 2006. Her songs "Jealous", "Foolish Heart" and "Make You Mine" topped the Philippine charts in 2003, making her the first female OPM artist to have three number-one singles on a single calendar year. Her hit single "Love Moves in Mysterious Ways" held the record for longest running number-one OPM song, spending twelve consecutive weeks atop the Philippine charts in 2005. Her single "Araw Mo" is the first original birthday song and ringtone by an OPM artist that became a moderate hit. Despite not having released new material since 2013, she was ranked at number 8 and 5 on Spotify's most-streamed female OPM artists of 2018 and 2020, respectively, with an average of 963,468 monthly listeners.

Despite music being her primary source of accomplishment, Nina has earned recognition through televised dance competitions. On December 2, 2007, Nina was declared Monthly Champion on ABC-5's Shall We Dance? when she performed a freestyle-jive with professional ballroom dancer Efren Ibo. On January 18, 2009, she was recognized as Daily Winner on ABS-CBN's Magpasikat, a temporary replacement after the suspension of the noontime variety show Showtime, after performing a group dance with the G-Force.

== 2003 ==
Awards show	Nomination(s)	Categories	Results
16th Awit Awards	Nina (Herself)	Best Performance by a Female Recording Artist	Nominated
16th Awit Awards	"2nd Floor"	Song of the Year	Nominated
16th Awit Awards	"2nd Floor"	Best Produced Record of the Year	Nominated
16th Awit Awards	"2nd Floor"	Best R&B	Won
16th Awit Awards	Nina (Herself)	People's Choice Favorite New Female Artist	Won
2003 Candy Rap Awards	Nina (Herself)	Favorite Female Artist	Won
2003 Magic 89.9	Nina (Herself)	OPM Artist of the Year	Won
2003 Magic 89.9	"Jealous"	OPM Song of the Year	Won
3rd MTV Pilipinas Music Awards	"Jealous"	Favorite Female Video	Nominated
3rd MTV Pilipinas Music Awards	Nina (Herself)	Favorite New Artist in a Video	Won
3rd MTV Pilipinas Music Awards	"Jealous"	Favorite Song	Nominated
2003 RX 93.1	Nina (Herself)	OPM Female Artist of the Year	Won
2003 Teens Voice Awards	Nina (Herself)	Favorite Female Artist	Won

== 2004 ==
Awards show	Nomination(s)	Categories	Results
17th Aliw Awards	Nina (Herself)	Best Female Performer in Hotel, Music Lounges and Bars	Won
17th Awit Awards	"Di Ba"	Best R&B	Nominated
17th Awit Awards	"Goodnite But Not Goodbye"	Best Engineered Recording	Won
2004 Center for Pop Music Philippines, Inc.	Nina (Herself)	Singing Ambassador of Goodwill	Won
2004 Mega Magazine	Nina (Herself)	One of the Women to Watch in 2004	Won
2004 MTV Philippines	Nina (Herself)	Artist of the Month (January 2004)	Won
4th MTV Pilipinas Music Awards	"Loving You"	Favorite Female Video	Nominated
2004 Philippine Business Excellence Award/Awards and Recognition Association of the Philippines	Nina (Herself)	No. 1 Female R&B Singer in the Philippines	Won
2004 Tinig Awards	Nina (Herself)	Top 10 Singers in the Philippines	Won
2004 97.1 WLS-FM	Nina (Herself)	Artist of the Month (January 2004)	Won

== 2005 ==
Awards show	Nomination(s)	Categories	Results
18th Aliw Awards	Pop Ko 'To! (with Warner artists)	Best Collaboration in a Major Concert	Nominated
18th Aliw Awards	El Niño, La Niña (with Nyoy Volante)	Best Collaboration in a Concert	Nominated
18th Aliw Awards	Nina (Herself)	Best Female Performer in Hotel, Music Lounges and Bars	Nominated
18th Aliw Awards	Nina (Herself)	Most Promising Female Entertainer	Nominated
1st ASAP Platinum Circle	Nina Live!	Platinum Circle Award (5× Platinum)	Won
18th Awit Awards	Nina (Herself)	Best Performance by a Female Recording Artist	Nominated
18th Awit Awards	"Miracle" (Christian Bautista and Nina)	Best Performance by a Duet	Nominated
5th MTV Pilipinas Music Awards	"I Don't Want to Be Your Friend"	Favorite Female Video	Nominated
2005 National Consumers Quality Awards	Nina (Herself)	Best Female Acoustic Artist	Won
1st Philippine Hip-Hop Music Awards	Nina (Herself)	Female R&B Artist of the Year	Nominated

== 2006 ==
Awards show	Nomination(s)	Categories	Results
19th Aliw Awards	Nina Live! The Concert	Best Female Major Concert	Nominated
19th Aliw Awards	Nina (Herself)	Best Female Performance in a Concert	Nominated
19th Aliw Awards	Nina (Herself)	Best Female Performer in Hotel, Music Lounges and Bars	Nominated
2nd ASAP 24K Awards	Nina	24K Award (Gold)	Won
2nd ASAP Platinum Circle	Nina Live!	Platinum Circle Award (6× Platinum)	Won
19th Awit Awards	Nina (Herself)	Best Performance by a Female Recording Artist	Nominated
19th Awit Awards	"The Closer I Get to You" (Nina and Thor)	Best Performance by a Duet	Won
19th Awit Awards	"Burn" (Nina and Christian Bautista)	Best Performance by a Duet	Nominated
19th Awit Awards	Nina Live!	Best Selling Album of the Year	Won
6th MTV Pilipinas Music Awards	"I'll Always Love You"	Favorite Female Video	Nominated
1st MYX Music Awards	Nina (Herself)	Favorite Artist	Nominated
1st MYX Music Awards	Nina (Herself)	Favorite Female Artist	Nominated
1st MYX Music Awards	"Burn" (Nina and Christian Bautista)	Favorite Collaboration	Won
1st MYX Music Awards	"Love Moves in Mysterious Ways"	Favorite Remake	Nominated
2006 RX 93.1	Nina (Herself)	OPM Female Artist of the Year	Won

== 2007 ==
Awards show	Nomination(s)	Categories	Results
20th Aliw Awards	Nina (Herself)	Best Female Performance in a Concert	Won
3rd ASAP Pop Viewer's Choice Awards	"Someday"	Pop Female Performance	Nominated
3rd ASAP Platinum Circle	Nina Live!	Platinum Circle Award (8× Platinum)	Won
3rd ASAP Platinum Circle	Nina	Platinum Circle Award (Platinum)	Won
20th Awit Awards	Nina (Herself)	Best Performance by a Female Recording Artist	Nominated
20th Awit Awards	"Someday"	Song of the Year	Nominated
20th Awit Awards	Nina	Best Selling Album of the Year	Nominated
20th Awit Awards	"Someday"	Best Ballad	Nominated
20th Awit Awards	"I Need Your Love"	Best R&B	Nominated
20th Awit Awards	"I Do"	Best Engineered Recording	Won
20th Awit Awards	Nina (Herself)	People's Choice Favorite Female Artist	Won
20th Awit Awards	"Someday"	People's Choice Favorite Song of the Year	Won
2nd MYX Music Awards	Nina (Herself)	Favorite Female Artist	Nominated
2nd MYX Music Awards	"Someday"	Favorite Mellow Video	Nominated
2nd MYX Music Awards	"I Do"	Favorite Urban Video	Won
3rd Philippine Hip-Hop Music Awards	Nina (Herself)	R&B Artist of the Year	Won
2007 Shall We Dance?	Nina (Herself)	Monthly Champion (November 2007)	Won
2007 USTv People's Choice Awards	"Someday"	Students' Choice of Music Video	Won

== 2008 ==
Awards show	Nomination(s)	Categories	Results
21st Aliw Awards	Nina (Herself)	Best Female Performance in a Concert	Nominated
21st Aliw Awards	Nina (Herself)	Best Female Performer in Hotel, Music Lounges and Bars	Nominated
4th ASAP 24K Awards	Nina Sings the Hits of Diane Warren	24K Award (Gold)	Won
4th ASAP Pop Viewer's Choice Awards	"I Don't Want to Miss a Thing"	Pop Song	Nominated
4th ASAP Platinum Circle	Nina Live!	Platinum Circle Award (9× Platinum)	Won
4th ASAP Platinum Circle	Nina Featuring the Hits of Barry Manilow	Platinum Circle Award (Platinum)	Won
21st Awit Awards	"Collide" (for Xenoa)	Best Song Written for Movie/TV/Stage Play	Nominated

== 2009 ==
Awards show	Nomination(s)	Categories	Results
22nd Aliw Awards	Nina (Herself)	Best Female Performer in Hotel, Music Lounges and Bars	Nominated
5th ASAP Pop Viewer's Choice Awards	Nina (Herself)	Pop Female Artist	Nominated
5th ASAP Pop Viewer's Choice Awards	Renditions of the Soul	Pop Album	Nominated
5th ASAP Platinum Circle	Nina Live!	Platinum Circle Award (10× Platinum)	Won
5th ASAP Platinum Circle	Nina Live!	The Elite Platinum Circle Award	Won
22nd Awit Awards	Nina (Herself)	Best Performance by a Female Recording Artist	Nominated
22nd Awit Awards	Nina Sings the Hits of Diane Warren	Best Selling Album of the Year	Nominated
22nd Awit Awards	Nina (Herself)	People's Choice Best Performance by a Female Recording Artist	Nominated
1st PMPC Star Awards for Music	Nina (Herself)	Female Pop Artist of the Year	Nominated
1st PMPC Star Awards for Music	Nina Sings the Hits of Diane Warren	Revival Album of the Year	Nominated
1st Wave 89.1 Urban Music Awards	Nina (Herself)	Best Female Soul/R&B Artist	Nominated
1st Wave 89.1 Urban Music Awards	Renditions of the Soul	Best Album	Won
1st Wave 89.1 Urban Music Awards	"She's Out of My Life"	Best Remake	Nominated

== 2010 ==
Awards show	Nomination(s)	Categories	Results
23rd Aliw Awards	Sessionistas (with ASAP Sessionistas)	Best Collaboration in a Major Concert	Nominated
23rd Aliw Awards	Love2Love2Love (with Side A and Freestyle)	Best Collaboration in a Major Concert	Nominated
6th ASAP Pop Viewer's Choice Awards	Renditions of the Soul	Pop Album	Nominated
41st GMMSF Box-Office Entertainment Awards	Nina (Herself)	Female Recording Artist of the Year	Won
2010 Magpasikat	Nina (Herself) (with G-Force)	Daily Winner (shared with Sitti's group)	Won
2nd PMPC Star Awards for Music	Nina (Herself)	Female Recording Artist of the Year	Nominated
2nd PMPC Star Awards for Music	Renditions of the Soul	Pop Album of the Year	Nominated
2nd PMPC Star Awards for Music	Nina (Herself)	Female Pop Artist of the Year	Won
2nd PMPC Star Awards for Music	Renditions of the Soul	Acoustic Album of the Year	Nominated
2nd PMPC Star Awards for Music	Nina (Herself)	Female Acoustic Artist of the Year	Nominated
2nd PMPC Star Awards for Music	Renditions of the Soul	Revival Album of the Year	Nominated
2nd Wave 89.1 Urban Music Awards	Nina (Herself)	Best Female Soul/R&B Artist	Nominated
2nd Wave 89.1 Urban Music Awards	Renditions of the Soul	Best Album	Won
2nd Wave 89.1 Urban Music Awards	Nina (Herself)	Special Achievement Award	Won

== 2011 ==
Awards show	Nomination(s)	Categories	Results
24th Awit Awards	"Muli" (Jay R and Nina)	Best Collaboration	Nominated
24th Awit Awards	Diamond: Greatest Hits 2002-2010	Best Album Package	Nominated
42nd GMMSF Box-Office Entertainment Awards	Nina (Herself)	Female Concert Performer of the Year	Nominated
42nd GMMSF Box-Office Entertainment Awards	Nina (Herself)	Female Recording Artist of the Year	Nominated
2011 Pattaya International Music Festival	Nina (Herself)	Golden Key to the City of Pattaya	Won
3rd Wave 89.1 Urban Music Awards	Nina (Herself)	Best Female Style Icon	Nominated

== 2012 ==
Awards show	Nomination(s)	Categories	Results
25th Awit Awards	"Ikaw na Sana" (Noel Cabangon and Nina)	Best Collaboration	Nominated
25th Awit Awards	Stay Alive	Best Album Package	Nominated
4th PMPC Star Awards for Music	Stay Alive	Album of the Year	Nominated
4th PMPC Star Awards for Music	Nina (Herself)	Female Pop Artist of the Year	Nominated
4th PMPC Star Awards for Music	"Dance"	Music Video of the Year	Nominated
3rd Wave 89.1 Urban Music Awards	Nina (Herself)	Best Female Style Icon	Nominated

== 2013 ==
Awards show	Nomination(s)	Categories	Results
5th PMPC Star Awards for Music	All Good	Album of the Year	Nominated
5th PMPC Star Awards for Music	Nina (Herself)	Female Recording Artist of the Year	Nominated
5th PMPC Star Awards for Music	Nina (Herself)	Female Pop Artist of the Year	Nominated

== 2014 ==
Awards show	Nomination(s)	Categories	Results
27th Aliw Awards	Nina (Herself)	Best Female Performer in Hotel, Music Lounges and Bars	Nominated
27th Awit Awards	Nina (Herself)	Best Performance by a Female Recording Artist	Nominated
27th Awit Awards	Nina (Herself)	Entertainment Gateway Group (EGG) Allhits.ph's Most Downloaded Artist for 2013	Won
27th Awit Awards	"Dont Say Goodbye"	Entertainment Gateway Group (EGG) Allhits.ph's Most Downloaded Song for 2013	Won

== Other notable awards ==
Year	Competition show	Facilitator	Categories	Results
1985	Lunchdate - "Bulilit Jamboree"	GMA Network	Daily Winner	Won
1989	Kids Go Broadway	SM North Edsa	Grand Champion	Won
1991	Tanghalan ng Kampeon	GMA Network	Weekly Champion (7 weeks)	Won
1993— 1994	Quest for the Best	Panasonic	Grand Finalist	Won
1999	Linggo ng Wika	Miriam College	Grand Champion	Won

== Awit Awards History ==
Year	Categories	Nominations	Results
2003 (16th)	Best Performance by a Female Recording Artist	Bituin Ecalante - "Kung Ako na Lang Sana" ←; Kyla - "I Feel for You"; Aiza Seguerra - "Akala Mo..."; Nina - "2nd Floor"; Radha - "Closer to You"; Anna Fegi - "Closer You and I"	Nominated
2003 (16th)	Song of the Year	Piolo Pascual - "Kailangan Kita"; Bituin Ecalante - "Kung Ako na Lang Sana"; Nina - "2nd Floor"; Roselle Nava - "'Wag Ka Nang Magbabalik"; Jamie Rivera - "Only Selfless Love" ←	Nominated
2003 (16th)	Best Produced Record of the Year	Bituin Ecalante - "Kung Ako na Lang Sana" ←; Nina - "2nd Floor"; Wency Cornejo - "Hanggang"; Carol Banawa - "Stay"; Jamie Rivera - "Only Selfless Love"	Nominated
2003 (16th)	Best R&B	Nina - "2nd Floor" ←; 17:28 - "All I've Got"; Kyla - "This Day"; Toy Symphony - "Namimilipit sa Sarap"; Tribe of Levi - "Let Me Love You Baby"	Won
2003 (16th)	People's Choice Favorite New Female Artist	Nina - "2nd Floor" ←	Won
2004 (17th)	Best R&B	Artstrong - "Benefit of the Doubt"; Kyla - "I Will Find You" ←; Akafellas - "Beside You"; Kyla - "Bounce"; Nina - "Di Ba"	Nominated
2004 (17th)	Best Engineered Recording	Barbie's Cradle - "All I Need"; Gary Valenciano - "Kailangan Kita"; Nina - "Goodnite But Not Goodbye" ←; Gary Valenciano - "Di Bale na Lang"; Regine Velasquez - "Pangarap Ko ang Ibigin Ka"	Won
2005 (18th)	Best Performance by a Female Recording Artist	Bituin Escalante - "Gabing Kulimlim"; Bituin Escalante - "Always Somewhere"; Frenchy Dy - "Raindrops Will Fall"; Kitchie Nadal - "'Wag na 'Wag Mong Sasabihin" ←; Nina - "I Don't Want to Be Your Friend"	Nominated
2005 (18th)	Best Performance by a Duet	Pido & Paolo Santos - "Unexpectedly"; Pido & Jen Panuncio - "On and On"; Jerome John Hughes & Karylle - "Pagbigyan ang Puso"; Jennylyn Mercado & Janno Gibbs - "If I'm Not in Love with You" ←; Christian Bautista & Nina - "Miracle"	Nominated
2006 (19th)	Best Performance by a Female Recording Artist	Regine Velasquez - "Shine"; Barbie Almalbis - "Just a Smile" ←; Rachelle Ann Go - "If You Walk Away"; Nina - "Love Moves in Mysterious Ways"; Ella May Saison - "Ikaw ang Lahat sa Akin"	Nominated
2006 (19th)	Best Performance by a Duet	Jay R & Kyla - "Say That You Love Me"; Jerome John Hughes & Kyla - "Let the Love Begin"; Nina & Christian Bautista - "Burn"; Nina & Thor - "The Closer I Get to You" ←; Sharon Cuneta & Ogie Alcasid - "Nandito Ako"	Won
2006 (19th)	Best Selling Album of the Year	MYMP - Versions & Beyond; Parokya Ni Edgar - Halina sa Parokya; Gary Valenciano - Soul Full; Orange and Lemons - Strike whilst the Iron Is Hot; Nina - Nina Live! ←	Won
2007 (20th)	Best Performance by a Female Recording Artist	Skarlet - "Skarlet"; Lani Misalucha - "I Live for Your Love" ←; Regine Velasquez - "Till I Met You"; Nina - "Someday"; Barbie Almalbis - "Dahilan"	Nominated
2007 (20th)	Song of the Year	Sandwich - "Sugod"; Sugarfree - "Kung Ayaw Mo na sa Akin"; Kamikazee - "Narda" ←; Rivermaya - "Isang Bandila"; Nina - "Someday"	Nominated
2007 (20th)	Best Selling Album of the Year	Michael V. - The Bubble G Anthology; Sharon Cuneta - Isn't It Romantic; Various Artists - Kami nAPO Muna ←; Sponge Cola - Transit; Nina - Nina; Sitti - Café Bossa	Nominated
2007 (20th)	Best Ballad	Kyla - "Beautiful Days"; Hale - "Waltz"; Toni Gonzaga - "We Belong"; Gary Valenciano - "In Another Lifetime" ←; Nina - "Someday"	Nominated
2007 (20th)	Best R&B	Reuben Laurente & Regine Velasquez - "A Single Soul" ←; Kimberly Dan - "Me, Myself & I"; Kris Lawrence - "How Can I"; Gary Valenciano - "Sana Bukas"; Nina - "I Need Your Love"	Nominated
2007 (20th)	Best Engineered Recording	Kyla - "Doin' Just Fine"; Various Artists - "Waray-Waray"; Amber - "Manila"; Top Suzara - "Sabihin Mo Na"; Gary Valenciano - "Wait Forever"; Nina - "I Do" ←	Won
2007 (20th)	People's Choice Favorite Female Artist	Skarlet - "Skarlet"; Lani Misalucha - "I Live for Your Love"; Regine Velasquez - "Till I Met You"; Nina - "Someday" ←; Barbie Almalbis - "Dahilan"	Won
2007 (20th)	People's Choice Favorite Song of the Year	Sandwich - "Sugod"; Sugarfree - "Kung Ayaw Mo na sa Akin"; Kamikazee - "Narda"; Rivermaya - "Isang Bandila"; Nina - "Someday" ←	Won
2008 (21st)	Best Song Written for Movie/TV/Stage Play	Jolina Magdangal - "Alinlangan" (for Super Twins); Piolo Pascual & Regine Velasquez - "Paano Kita Iibigin" (for Paano Kita Iibigin) ←; Bamboo - "Argos" (for Rounin); Parokya Ni Edgar - "Walang Susuko" (for Lastikman); Nina - "Collide" (for Xenoa)	Nominated
2009 (22nd)	Best Performance by a Female Recording Artist	Regine Velasquez - "And I Love You So"; Charice Pempengco - "And I Am Telling You I'm Not Going"; Aiza Seguerra - "Open Arms" ←; Nikki Gil - "Gotta Go My Own Way"; Nina - "Love Will Lead You Back"	Nominated
2009 (22nd)	Best Selling Album of the Year	Martin Nievera - Ikaw ang Pangarap; Bamboo - Tomorrow Becomes Yesterday; KC Concepcion - aka Cassandra; Eraserheads - Eraserheads: The Reunion Concert 08.30.08; Gretchen Barretto - Unexpected; Bugoy Drilon - Paano na Kaya; Charice Pempengco - Charice ←; Willie Revillame - Giling Giling; Ogie Alcasid - The Great Filipino Song Book; Kris Aquino - The Greatest Love; Regine Velasquez - Low Key; Nina - Nina Sings the Hits of Diane Warren; Gabby Concepcion - Gabby Concepcion; DJ Sundalong Bata & Miss Ganda - Hip-Rap	Nominated
2009 (22nd)	People's Choice Best Performance by a Female Recording Artist	Regine Velasquez - "And I Love You So" ←; Charice Pempengco - "And I Am Telling You I'm Not Going"; Aiza Seguerra - "Open Arms"; Nikki Gil - "Gotta Go My Own Way"; Nina - "Love Will Lead You Back"	Nominated
2011 (24th)	Best Collaboration	Champ Lui Pio featuring Gloc-9 & Noel Cabangon - "Sari Saring Kwento"; Aiza Seguerra, Juris, Carol Banawa & Yeng Constantino - "Star ng Pasko"; Jay R & Nina - "Muli"; Parokya Ni Edgar featuring Happee Sy - "Pangarap Lang Kita" ←; Raffi & Davey - "The Love Song"	Nominated
2011 (24th)	Best Album Package	Bryan Termulo - Bryan Begins ←; Dolphy - Handog Ni Pidol: A Lifetime of Music and Laughter; KC Concepcion - KC; Vina Morales - Awit ng Ating Buhay; Nina - Diamond: Greatest Hits 2002-2010	Nominated
2012 (25th)	Best Collaboration	Gloc-9 featuring Sheng Belmonte - "Walang Natira" ←; Bugoy Drilon & Liezel Garcia - "Give Love on Christmas Day"; Noel Cabangon & Nina - "Ikaw na Sana"; Anton Alvarez & Sarah Geronimo - "Wish"; Sitti & Jek Manuel - "Ako'y Sa'yo at Ika'y Akin"	Nominated
2012 (25th)	Best Album Package	Bamboo - No Water, No Moon; Zia Quizon - Zia; Slapshock - Kinse Kalibre ←; Jed Madela - Breathe Again; Nina - Stay Alive	Nominated
2014 (27th)	Best Performance by a Female Recording Artist	Eurika - "Susi ng Aking Puso"; Eurika - "Kumakabog"; Janice Javier - "Coming Home"; Klarisse De Guzman - "Slowly"; Zia Quizon - "Pasakalye" ←; Isabelle de Leon - "1 Week To Move On"; Karylle - "Kiss You"; Charice - "Anything for You"; KZ Tandingan - "Bakit Lumuluha"; Aiza Seguerra - "Ano'ng Nangyari Sa Ating Dalawa"; Karylle - "Sa'yo na Lang Ako"; Regine Velasquez-Alcasid - "Araw, Ulap, Langit"; Sheng Belmonte - "Single"; Sarah Geronimo - "Ikot-Ikot"; Nina - "Sa Isang Tingin"; Roselle Nava - "Nagmamakaawa"	Nominated
