= Heaven (Nina Girado album) =

Studio album by Nina
- Released: August 20, 2002
- Recorded: 2001–July 2002
- Studio: Pinknoise Studio (Quezon City, Philippines); Jam Creations Studio
- Genre: Pop; R&B
- Length: 41:51 (Standard edition); 52:25 (Special edition)
- Language: English; Tagalog
- Label: Warner Music Philippines
- Producer: Ricky R. Ilacad; Neil C. Gregorio; Ferdie Marquez; Lowkey

Nina chronology
| Heaven (2002) | Smile (2003) |

Singles from Heaven
- 1. "Heaven" Released: October 2002; 2. "2nd Floor" Released: December 2002; 3. "Jealous" Released: February 2003; 4. "Foolish Heart" Released: April 2003; 5. "Loving You" Released: June 2003

Heaven is the debut studio album by Filipino singer Nina, released in the Philippines on August 20, 2002, by Warner Music Philippines. The album is heavily influenced by jazzy lounge, pop-R&B and composed of songs that resemble the sound of international records at the time. Under the direction of Warner managing head Ricky R. Ilacad, foreign songwriters and arrangers from the United States and South Korea, including Shelly Peiken and Guy Roche, were hired for the production of the album. Ilacad was very impressed with Nina's submitted demo version of Steve Perry's "Foolish Heart" which they decided to re-record for the album.

Upon release, the album received generally positive reviews. Most critics applauded Nina's vocal range and technique, as well as the composition of songs. The album was a commercial success in the Philippines, peaking at number one on the PH Top 10 Albums chart. The album is credited for popularizing the acoustic phenomenon in the Philippines. It earned numerous awards from various music organizations, and became one of the best-selling OPM albums in 2003. In terms of musical style, the album has been referenced for the use of whistle register by OPM albums released in the later years. In addition, Nina was given favorable comparisons to Mariah Carey. Heaven was made available on digital download through iTunes and Amazon.com MP3 Download on January 23, 2007. As of October 2003, the album has reached double platinum status by the Philippine Association of the Record Industry (PARI), denoting over 60,000 copies sold in the Philippines.

Five singles were released from the album, all of which became commercially successful in the country. "Heaven", the first single, was released alongside the album. "2nd Floor" was later released as a radio single. The album and its first single, initially, had weak chart performance. It was the third single "Jealous" that became a number-one hit for three weeks, also enabling the album to increase in sales and climb to number-one position of album charts. Following the success of the third single, two cover versions were released as official singles. "Foolish Heart", a song originally included on Nina's demo, began receiving heavy airplay and later, charted at number-one in the country for four weeks. "Loving You", a song originally done by Ric Segreto, was released as the final single from the album. It peaked within the Top 3 of singles charts, proving that Nina has become a hit maker.

== Background ==
Nina was five years old when she started singing a Lea Salonga single she heard over the radio. Her father, Filbert, noticed her potential and immediately trained her to hone her skills by doing several techniques such as submerging her into a drum of water, while belting out her high notes. All the hard work paid off a few months later when she was declared as daily winner on GMA-7 Lunchdate's "Bulilit Jamboree" in 1985. In 1991, she joined the most popular defunct talent search in the Philippines, Tanghalan ng Kampeon, where she became a champion for seven weeks. When she went to Miriam College and took up a bachelor's degree in Accountancy, her father had a sudden change of heart. Instead of a professional music career, he wanted his daughter to finish her studies and then join him in the United States to work. Because of too much love for singing, she disobeyed her father and joined different bands. He gave up on trying to stop her, and just told her to maintain good grades.

"Siya nag-push sa akin nun tapos biglang ayaw na niya. Hindi ko alam... [He's the one who pushed me on singing, but then he suddenly gave up. I don't know why...]"

— Nina, on the struggles she faced with her father's change of heart.

At seventeen, she became a vocalist of the XS, The Big Thing, MYMP, Silk and lastly, the Essence. After college, she recorded an amateur demo CD with the help of a friend. It was composed of three tracks, including the Steve Perry song "Foolish Heart", "Breathe Again" and "Against All Odds (Take a Look at Me Now)", recorded in a home studio with only a guitar for accompaniment. After listening to the demos, Warner Music managing director at that time, Ricky Ilacad wanted to sign her up even without seeing or hearing her in person. Two months after her father died of heart attack in the United States, she signed her first contract with Warner Music.

== Music and lyrics ==
In 2000, after Nina finished college, she immediately recorded and sent a demo to Warner Music Philippines. Ricky lacad, the head of Warner Management at that time, was so impressed that he wanted to sign her up even without seeing or hearing her in person. Believing that she has the potential to be the next superstar, Ilacad made a huge preparation for the release of Nina's debut album. "Foolish Heart", a song included on her demo, was re-recorded and became her first recording. The arrangement showed her range from falsetto to high vocal belting. It also became her trademark single, specially when it comes to the use whistle register. Aside from "Foolish Heart", she recorded another cover version, "Loving You", which was originally released by late Ric Segreto. It was later released also as a single.

Unlike all the other OPM records of 2002, Heaven was heavily influenced by jazzy lounge pop-R&B. International songwriters Shelly Peiken, Guy Roche, Brett Laurence and Gary Haase contributed some of the album's tracks. Peiken is responsible for the songs "First Kiss" and "Jealous" (with Laurence) which became Nina's first ever chart-topper. Laurence, this time with Haase, also contributed her first ever single "Heaven". Additional lyrics for the official remix of "Heaven" were made by Artstrong, who was also featured on the rap part of the song. Arnie Mendaros, vocal coach of Nina, wrote and composed "2nd Floor", which later became an award-winning and charting promotional single. It also became one of the first Taglish Filipino pop, R&B songs ever released, with lyrics of "Sa bawat sandali [...] Up, down, movin' all around." Nina described Heaven as "a mix of pop and R&B," while critics noted the heavy influence of hip-hop to the album. Paolo Reyes of The Philippine Star stated the album "features 10 smooth and euphonic tracks infused with an eclectic blend of styles ranging from rap to romantic. Armed with a panoply of fleeting ballads for lovelorn (and lonely-hearted) listeners, the album also boasts rap styling remixes by Artstrong and DJ Lowkey lending the compilation a true trip-hop, R&B feel." Nina cited Mariah Carey as one of her major influences to the album, although she still stressed the originality of her sound, saying "But it's not like I want my career to imitate or even be compared with hers [Carey]. In the end, I want to be acknowledged as a singer of my own brand of music."

== Critical reception ==
Professional ratings
Review scores
| Source | Rating |
|---|---|
| Manila Bulletin | (positive) |
| The Philippine Star | (positive) |

Heaven was a critical acclaim, receiving praise for its production value, musical style and Nina's vocal ability. With successful singles like "Jealous" and "Foolish Heart," it is considered to be one of the main reasons why acoustic phenomenon became very much popular in the Philippines. It became one of the best-selling OPM albums of 2003 as well. Furthermore, the album became a benchmark in the incorporation of whistle register (similar to Mariah Carey's technique) to Filipino pop/R&B songs released in the later years. Leonardo Belen of Manila Bulletin described Heaven as "a groovy and breakthrough album, boasting of an international-sounding music and voice, sung by a young Filipina talent." According to music critic Paolo Reyes, the album is "an eclectic blend of styles ranging from rap to romantic. Armed with a panoply of fleeting ballads for lovelorn (and lonely-hearted) listeners," also describing it as "swinging, sentimental, and soulful." Baby A. Gil of The Philippine Star praised Heaven and Nina's vocal ability in the following statement:

"Heaven is quite a package. Production is sleek and Nina's delivery, smooth. A pronounced danceable beat segues from one cut to the next but it is never heavy nor frenetic. It is instead used as a stable base for Nina's sweet but definitely multi-octave singing voice. This is surely her strongest point and it is really a blessing to know that she can skillfully wield her vocals to conform to the demands of every song."

== Commercial performance ==
As of October 2003, the album had sold 60,000 copies, receiving a double platinum certification in the Philippines by PARI. To date, Heaven has sold 100,000 copies in the Philippines.

== Singles ==
In late 2002, "Heaven" was released accompanied by Nina's debut album with the same name. The song proved risky for Warner Music to break through an artist such as Nina who is extremely influenced with R&B. The song was considered to be one of the first R&B-hip hop inspired tracks in the Philippine music scene, which was rare for Filipino acts at that time. "Jealous" was released as the second commercial single from the album. Due to its extreme reception, Nina became a radio favorite as her songs gained more airplay. She won the "Best New Artist" awards on both MTV Pilipinas Music Awards and Awit Awards in 2003 due to the single's breakthrough. When the song was released in February 2003, it managed to pick up substantial airplay, allowing it to enter and top the charts immediately. In mid-2003, she released "Foolish Heart" as a single and a music video of the song was released and it charted on MYX Year-End chart at number thirteen. The construction of the song's remake was quite different from the original, as the melody was completely played through an acoustic guitar. The song is famous for the whistle register sung by Nina just before she ends the song, which immediately became her trademark. The last commercial single was "Loving You", a cover of a late Ric Segreto hit. It was released in the last quarter of 2003 and became another monster hit for Nina.

=== Other notable songs ===
"2nd Floor" was sent as a radio single in December 2002 to boost album sales and increase popularity. It was hailed as the "Best R&B Song" in the 2003 Awit Awards and allowed Nina to bag the "Best New Artist" award as well. Since it was not commercially released, the song had no video, and only a live performance of Nina was issued in music video channels. Late in 2003, "Simula" was released as a promotional single for the album and it became the theme song for a Nescafé commercial, while "Talk to Me" was used, also as a theme song, but for a Colgate commercial.

== Promotion ==
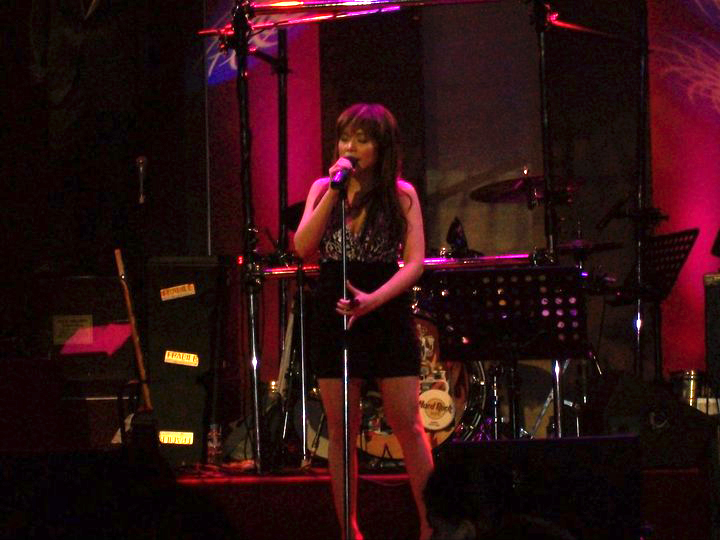
Nina performing "Jealous" at Hard Rock Cafe on March 12, 2011.

Heaven is the first album of Nina as a breakthrough artist, making her unfamiliar to everyone during the album's release. To gain fans and promote her album, she did concert performances, guestings and TV appearances. In 2003, she was featured in an episode of MYX Live!, hosted by Rico Blanco, where she performed acoustic versions of "Heaven" and "2nd Floor". Aside from the album's singles, she performed her versions of "Through the Fire", "It Might Be You", and Mariah Carey's "Never Too Far" and "Through the Rain". In the same year, she had a back-to-back major concert with Kyla entitled Cold War. The concert began when rivalry sparked between the two artists, and its production was full of showdowns and face-offs. Their rivalry was taken seriously by fans, and was even compared to that of Nora Aunor and Vilma Santos. She also performed as special guest on Paolo Santos' concert, Acoustic Night Out, singing her single "Foolish Heart" and "Power of Two" with Santos. She performed the same single, as well as "Jealous", on Freestyle's Acoustic Night Out concert at OnStage. She has also performed the album's songs on MTV Live and on the first ever MYX Mo!—where she did a live whistle for "2nd Floor" and collaborated with D'Coy on the remix version of "Heaven."

Most of the album's singles were later performed live throughout the Nina Just Wanna Have Fun (2005) concert at the Music Museum, as well as the Nina Live! (2005) concert at the Araneta Coliseum. "Jealous" was sung in a higher version on Nina's Valentine's Day concert with Freestyle and Side A, Love2Love2Love (2010). The rest of the songs were also performed on Nina... The Diamond Soul Siren (2010) concert. Heaven's music videos are known having playful storylines, colorful scenery, creative and imaginative special effects. They focused on a youthful vibe and soulful theme. The album's music videos received heavy rotation on MTV Philippines and MYX, helping them to reach the top of video and radio charts.

=== Re-release ===
In October 2003, Heaven was re-released in a Special Edition. The album packaging is slightly different from the original release, with just a silver cardboard attached to the album case and written on it is the new track list. Three new tracks were added—the acoustic version of "Jealous", the Nescafé theme song "Simula", and the Colgate theme song "Talk to Me". The album version of "Loving You" was also replaced with its Radio Edit version.

== Awards and accolades ==
Heaven became a huge breakthrough for Nina, earning numerous awards and positive response from critics. On the 2003 Awit Awards, she was nominated for four categories—including Best Performance by a Female Recording Artist, Song of the Year, Best Produced Record of the Year and Best R&B song for "2nd Floor"—where she won Best R&B song and a People's Choice award for Favorite New Female Artist. However, she lost Best Performance by a Female Recording Artist and Best Produced Record of the Year to Bituin Escalante's "Kung Ako na Lang Sana", and Song of the Year to Jamie Rivera's "Only Selfless Love". "2nd Floor" is considered to be a success, earning a few awards and entering Philippine music charts, without even a commercial release. In the same year, she had three nominations for the MTV Pilipinas Music Awards—including Favorite Female Video, Favorite New Artist in a Video and Favorite Song for "Jealous". She won Favorite New Artist in a Video, but lost the other two awards to Regine Velasquez' "Sa Aking Pag-iisa". Later in the same year, she won the OPM Artist of the Year award by Magic 89.9, receiving another Song of the Year award for "Jealous". She also grabbed the OPM Female Artist of the Year award by RX 93.1.

By the end of the year, Nina has proven herself as an established artist, achieving the "Best New Artist" titles on both Awit Awards and MTV Pilipinas Music Awards. In addition, her second commercial single, "Jealous", won the "Best Song" titles on both MTV Pilipinas Music Awards and Magic 89.9. Furthermore, she won the "OPM Artist of the Year" title on both Magic 89.9 and RX 93.1, and the "Favorite Female Artist" titles on both Candy Rap Awards and Teens Voice Awards. "Foolish Heart" was the most played single of 2003 as well. On the MTV Pilipinas Music Awards 2004, "Loving You" was nominated for Favorite Female Video, but lost the award to Jolina Magdangal's "Bahala Na".

List of awards and nominations

| Year | Award | Category | Result |
|---|---|---|---|
| 2003 | Awit Awards | Best Performance by a Female Recording Artist | Nominated |
| 2003 | Awit Awards | Song of the Year ("2nd Floor") | Nominated |
| 2003 | Awit Awards | Best Produced Record of the Year ("2nd Floor") | Nominated |
| 2003 | Awit Awards | Best R&B ("2nd Floor") | Won |
| 2003 | Awit Awards | People's Choice Favorite New Female Artist | Won |
| 2003 | Candy Rap Awards | Favorite Female Artist | Won |
| 2003 | Magic 89.9 | OPM Artist of the Year | Won |
| 2003 | Magic 89.9 | OPM Song of the Year ("Jealous") | Won |
| 2003 | MTV Pilipinas Music Awards | Favorite Female Video ("Jealous") | Nominated |
| 2003 | MTV Pilipinas Music Awards | Favorite New Artist in a Video ("Jealous") | Won |
| 2003 | MTV Pilipinas Music Awards | Favorite Song ("Jealous") | Nominated |
| 2003 | RX 93.1 | OPM Female Artist of the Year | Won |
| 2003 | Teens Voice Awards | Favorite Female Artist | Won |
| 2004 | MTV Pilipinas Music Awards | Favorite Female Video ("Loving You") | Nominated |

== Track listing ==
Standard edition
| No. | Title | Writer(s) | Producer(s) | Length |
|---|---|---|---|---|
| 1. | "First Kiss" | Guy Roche; Shelly Peiken | Ferdie Marquez | 3:30 |
| 2. | "Heaven" | Brett Laurence; Gary Haase | Marquez | 4:03 |
| 3. | "2nd Floor" | Arnie Mendaros | Neil C. Gregorio | 4:08 |
| 4. | "Jealous" | Peiken; Laurence | Marquez | 4:15 |
| 5. | "Loving You" | Gerry Paraiso | Marquez | 4:58 |
| 6. | "Foolish Heart" | Steve Perry; Randy Goodrum | Marquez | 4:35 |
| 7. | "Greatest Gift of All" (with Artstrong) | Edwin Marollano; D-Brown | Gregorio | 3:58 |
| 8. | "Kung Ibibigay Sa'yo" | Marollano; Fuzzy | Gregorio | 3:35 |

Bonus tracks (Standard edition)
| No. | Title | Writer(s) | Producer(s) | Length |
|---|---|---|---|---|
| 9. | "Heaven" (Boywonder Remix featuring Artstrong) | Artstrong Clarion; Laurence; Haase | DJ Lowkey^{[a]} | 4:12 |
| 10. | "Foolish Heart" (Vibe Mix) | Perry; Goodrum | Marquez | 4:34 |

Bonus tracks (Special edition)
| No. | Title | Writer(s) | Length |
|---|---|---|---|
| 11. | "Jealous" (Acoustic) | Peiken; Laurence | 4:11 |
| 12. | "Simula" (Nescafé Theme) | | 3:05 |
| 13. | "Talk to Me" (Colgate Theme) | | 3:17 |

Notes

- Track 1 was originally recorded by i5.
- Track 5 was originally recorded by Ric Segreto.
- Track 6 was originally recorded by Steve Perry; acoustic arrangement by Jimmy Bondoc.
- ^{^a} signifies a remixer

== Personnel ==
Credits taken from Heaven's liner notes.

Production

- Darwin Concepcion – production assistant
- Nikki Cunanan – vocal recording
- Neil C. Gregorio – A&R administration, producer
- Ricky R. Ilacad – A&R administration, executive producer
- Lowkey – producer
- Don Manalang – vocal recording
- Ferdie Marquez – sequence and programming, mixing, producer
- Arnie Mendaros – vocal coach
- Ricky – production assistant
- Gery Samson – mixing
- Dante Tanedo – mixing, vocal recording

Personnel

- Artstrong Clarion – lead vocals, rap vocals
- Nina Girado – lead vocals, back-up vocals
- Ferdie Marquez – back-up vocals
- Noel Mendez – guitar

Album design

- Rey Cortez (of WMP Creative) – album cover layout
- Chris Genuino (of WMP Creative) – album cover layout
- Anne S. Poblador – album cover concept
- Lilen Uy – photography

Recording locations

- Pinknoise Studio (Quezon City, Philippines) – vocal recording
- Jam Creations Studio – vocal recording
- Chili Red Studio (NYL) – mastering

== Certifications ==
| Country | Provider | Certification | Sales |
|---|---|---|---|
| Philippines | PARI | 2× platinum | 95,000+ |

== Release history ==
| Region | Edition | Release date | Label | Catalogue |
|---|---|---|---|---|
| Philippines | Standard (CD + bonus tracks) | August 20, 2002 | Warner Music Philippines | 0927-44337-2 |
| Philippines | Special Edition (CD) | October 2003 | Warner Music Philippines | 504668042-2 |
| South Korea | Standard (CD) | January 23, 2007 | Warner Music Korea | 809274433763 |
| United States | Standard (Digital download + bonus tracks) | January 23, 2007 | WEA International | |
