= Jay Contreras =

Filipino musician

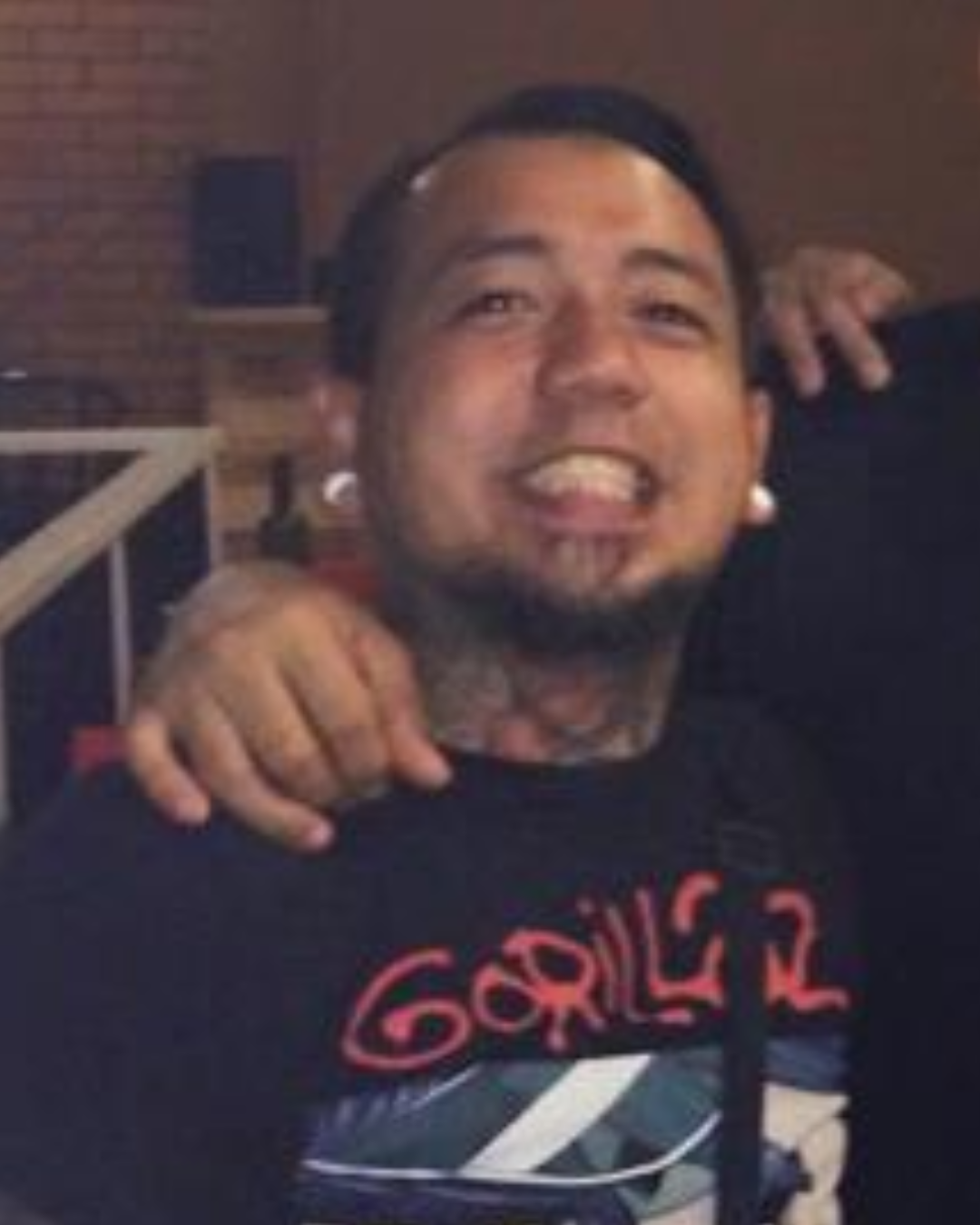
- Contreras in 2015
- Born: Ferdinand Jay Magtoto Contreras; June 4, 1979 (age 47); Quezon City, Philippines
- Occupations: Musician; songwriter
- Years active: 2000–present
- Spouse: Sarah Jane Abad (m. 2009; sep. 2020)
- Children: 2
- Musical career
- Genres: Pinoy rock; alternative rock; pop punk; hard rock; hardcore punk; post-hardcore
- Instruments: Vocals; guitar
- Labels: Universal; Warner Music; Tower of Doom

Ferdinand Jay Magtoto Contreras (born June 4, 1979) is a Filipino singer and songwriter known as one of the founding members and lead vocalist of the rock band Kamikazee.

== Career ==
Contreras began his music career in the early 2000 as the lead vocalist of the rock band Kamikazee, which was formed with his college friends from the University of the Philippines Diliman. While studying at the College of Fine Arts, Contreras invited four of his friends to perform at an exhibit. Chito Miranda, frontman of Parokya ni Edgar also a Fine Arts student at the time, was present and began inviting the group to open for Parokya ni Edgar's shows. The band gained early recognition through campus performances before releasing their debut album in 2002. Contreras was key to the success of their second album Maharot (2006), especially with the single "Narda", which became one of their most well-known songs.

He continued to contribute to the group's later albums, including Long Time Noisy (2009) and Romantico (2012), which featured the singles "Halik" and "Huling Sayaw" with Kyla. He also collaborated with Parokya ni Edgar on various recordings and live performances. Following his band hiatus in 2015, Contreras returned with the group for a reunion tour beginning in 2017.

In 2019, Contreras led Kamikazee in a special appearance at the 5th edition of Campfire Sessions, where they performed alongside Ely Buendia of Eraserheads. The set included "Pare Ko", "Narda", and "Ang Huling El Bimbo" in front of an intimate crowd of around 430 attendees.

In July 2024, Contreras appeared in a live performance video released by Tower of Doom, where he performed "Tsinelas" with Dilaw frontman Dilaw Obero. The collaboration revisited one of Kamikazee's early songs, originally released in 2002.

== Influences ==
According to interview with Offshore Music, Contreras has cited the Eraserheads as a major influence, particularly their debut album Ultraelectromagneticpop!, which he first heard in high school. He has also acknowledged the band's impact on other musicians and often discusses their influence with Chito Miranda of Parokya ni Edgar.

== Personal life ==
Contreras has been an animal lover since childhood, caring for a variety of pets including dogs, fish, and even exotic reptiles. He often refers to his dogs as his "children".

Contreras married actress Sarah Jane Abad on January 27, 2009 at the Paco Church in Manila. They have two children together, a son named Kidlat Caio and a daughter named Isla Euan. In May 2020, Sarah Abad confirmed via Instagram that she and Contreras had separated.

== Controversy ==
In October 2023, Contreras posted a brief message online after Kamikazee's scheduled appearance at the Kasanggayahan Festival in Casiguran, Sorsogon was canceled. Governor Edwin Hamor said the decision was due to alleged unprofessional behavior, and the band was sent home before its performance.

== Discography ==
=== With Kamikazee ===
- Kamikazee (2002)
- Maharot (2006)
- Long Time Noisy (2009)
- Romantico (2012)

=== As featured artist ===
- "Okatokat" with Parokya ni Edgar (2004)
- "The Ordertaker" with Parokya ni Edgar (2005)

=== Collaborations and other works ===
- Campfire Sessions live performance with Ely Buendia (2019)
- "Tsinelas" live collaboration with Dilaw Obero of Dilaw (2024)
- "Doo Bi Doo" – Cover song by Kamikazee included in the tribute album Kami nAPO Muna (2006) honoring APO Hiking Society
- Darna (2009–2010) – Credited as composer of the theme "Narda", performed by Kamikazee for the GMA network drama series
