= Loving You (Ric Segreto song) =

Single by Nina

from the album Heaven
- Released: October 2003
- Genre: Pop
- Length: 4:58
- Label: Warner Music Philippines
- Songwriter: Gerry Paraiso
- Producer: Ferdie Marquez

Nina singles chronology
"Foolish Heart" (2003)	"Loving You" (2003)	"Make You Mine" (2003)

"Loving You" is a song originally recorded by Filipino-American singer Ric Segreto for his debut album Segreto in 1982. Filipino singer Nina covered the song for her 2002 debut album Heaven.

== Nina version ==
Nina's version of "Loving You" was released in October 2003 as the fourth and final single from her album Heaven by Warner Music Philippines. The song was released after the commercial success of Nina's slow-tempo acoustic singles, and was slightly altered in the studio as a Radio Edit version for official release. The song was written by Gerry Paraiso, and produced by Ferdie Marquez. It is a pop ballad love song.

Upon release, the song and the album were met with critical acclaim, with most critics pointing out the international sound and smooth production as well as Nina's wide vocal range. The song was also nominated for Favorite Female Video on the 2004 MTV Pilipinas Music Awards, but lost to Jolina Magdangal's "Bahala Na". A high-budget music video accompanied the release of the single. It was directed by Avid Liongoren and features a heavy use of special visual effects. The video depicts Nina in a fantasy world, searching for the man of her dreams.

=== Background and release ===
After the critical acclaim received by Nina's first album Heaven and the commercial success of her second and third singles, "Jealous" and "Foolish Heart", Warner Music did not break the formula, and decided to release another love-ballad in the form of "Loving You". The song is also a cover like the previous release ("Foolish Heart"). It was originally recorded and popularized by Ric Segreto. The song was slightly altered from the album version, adding Nina's adlibs and falsetto on the intro part of the song, and this version was the one released to radio and was also used in the music video. In the last quarter of 2003, the song was released as her last single from the album. The song was released through digital download on January 23, 2007 via iTunes and Amazon.com MP3 download.

=== Music video ===
Nina near the end of the music video.

"Loving You" is the fourth official music video by Nina, regardless of "Heaven" (Boywonder Remix) and "Jealous" (Acoustic). The video was directed and edited by Avid Liongoren. Luis Buenaventura stood as the associate director, and he was also the one who added stop-motion animations to the video. Rommel Sales, on the other hand, was assigned as cinematographer. The video depicts Nina in a fantasy world with her love interest seen in pictures.

=== Synopsis ===
The video starts off with Nina walking against a blue background. She then passes by a pink signboard, which has a picture of her dream lover. Her love interest is then seen standing on a piece of rock that stands above the land. He waits there to be rescued by her. She starts searching for the man of her dreams, while rainbows and teddy bears appear in the background. She talks to a tiny and then a giant robot, asking for guidance and direction to her love interest. She is then seen walking towards an animated castle. She then rides an elevator, and sees the man, only to find out that he is very tiny. She picks up the man, which turns out to be candy, which she eats. Scenes of Nina singing against a blue moving background which eventually turns to pink, are interspersed throughout the video. The video ends with Nina, sleeping next to a magazine featuring the guy on its cover.

=== Live performances ===
Heaven was the first album of Nina as a breakthrough artist, making her unfamiliar to everyone at that time. To gain fans and promote her album, she has done concert performances, bar gigs and TV appearances. In 2002, she was featured in an episode of MYX Live!, hosted by Rico Blanco, where she performed songs from the album. She also sang "Through the Fire", "It Might Be You", and Mariah Carey's "Never Too Far" and "Through the Rain". At the same year, she had a back-to-back major concert with Kyla entitled Cold War. The concert began when rivalry sparked between the two artists, and its production was full of showdowns and face offs. Their rivalry was so strong, it was even compared to that of Nora Aunor and Vilma Santos. She has also performed Heaven singles on MTV Live and on the first ever MYX Mo!.

=== Official versions ===
Version	Length	Album
Album version	4:58	Heaven
Radio Edit	4:58	Heaven (Special Edition)
Catwalk Bliss Remix	5:21	Nina in the Mix: The Dense Modesto Remixes

=== Credits and personnel ===
Credits taken from Heaven's liner notes.

- Nina Girado - vocals
- Ferdie Marquez - producer
- Gerry Paraiso - songwriter
