= 2nd Floor (Nina song) =

Single by Nina

from the album Heaven
- Released: December 2002
- Genre: Pop; R&B
- Length: 4:07
- Label: Warner Music Philippines
- Songwriter: Arnie Mendaros
- Producer: Neil Gregorio

Nina singles chronology
"Heaven" (2002)	"2nd Floor" (2002)	"Jealous" (2003)

"2nd Floor" is a song by Filipino singer Nina from her 2002 debut album Heaven. It was released to radio in December 2002 by Warner Music Philippines as the album's first promo single in lieu of the album's release in the Philippines. The song was written by Arnie Mendaros, and produced by Neil Gregorio. As soon as Nina sent her demo to Warner and immediately got a contract with the label, production for her first album began. "2nd Floor" became one of the first OPM songs to feature Taglish lyrics and a pop-R&B arrangement. Nina's whistle register is very evident on the song.

Upon release, the song and the album were met with critical acclaim, with most critics pointing out the international sound and smooth production as well as Nina's wide vocal range. The song also earned her the Best New Artist awards on both Awit Awards and MTV Pilipinas Music Awards. "2nd Floor" was well received by the Philippine Association of the Record Industry (PARI) that it was given four nominations on the 2003 Awit Awards, where it won the Best R&B category.

== Background and release ==
At seventeen, she became a vocalist of the XS, The Big Thing, MYMP, Silk and lastly, the Essence. After college, she recorded an amateur demo CD with the help of a friend. It was composed of three tracks, including the Steve Perry song "Foolish Heart", "Breathe Again" and "Against All Odds (Take a Look at Me Now)", recorded in a home studio with only a guitar for accompaniment. After listening to the demos, Warner Music managing director at that time, Ricky Ilacad wanted to sign her up even without seeing or hearing her in person. Two months after her father died of a heart attack in the United States, she signed her first contract with Warner Music. Under the direction of Ilacad, foreign songwriters and arrangers from the United States and Korea, including Shelly Peiken and Guy Roche, were hired for the production of the album. The album is heavily influenced by jazzy lounge pop-R&B and composed of songs that are reminiscent to the sound of international records at that time.

"2nd Floor" is considered to be a radio-only single. It was released in December 2002 without commercial support and promotion. Since it was not commercially released, the song had no official music video, and only a live performance of Nina was issued in music video channels. The song was released to digital download on January 23, 2007, via iTunes and Amazon.com MP3 Download.

== Composition ==
"2nd Floor"
A sample of the song, featuring the Taglish lyrics and urban feel Mendaros incorporated to the music.

"2nd Floor", as well as other songs in Heaven, is heavily influenced by jazzy lounge pop-R&B which was different from other OPM records at that time. The song was written by Arnie Mendaros, who was Nina's vocal coach for the album, and produced by Neil Gregorio. The song features Taglish lyrics and an urban feel Mendaros incorporated to the music. It is one of the earliest Filipino pop-R&B songs, and showcases Nina's evident use of whistle register, which ranges up to B♭6. The song narrates how a girl feels for her loved one.

== Awards and accolades ==
In the 2003 Awit Awards, the song earned Nina four nominations—Best Performance by a Female Recording Artist, Song of the Year, Best Produced Record of the Year and Best R&B song. Despite not being commercially released, it won the Best R&B award and earned Nina the People's Choice award for Favorite New Female Artist. However, the Best Female Artist and Record of the Year awards were lost to Bituin Escalante's "Kung Ako na Lang Sana" and the Song of the Year to Jamie Rivera's "Only Selfless Love".

== Live performances ==
Heaven was the first album of Nina as a breakthrough artist, making her unfamiliar to everyone at that time. To gain fans and promote her album, she has done concert performances, bar gigs and TV appearances. In 2002, she was featured in an episode of MYX Live!, hosted by Rico Blanco, where she performed "2nd Floor". Aside from performing a few songs from the album, she sang "Through the Fire", "It Might Be You", and Mariah Carey's "Never Too Far" and "Through the Rain". At the same year, she had a back-to-back major concert with Kyla entitled Cold War. The concert began when rivalry sparked between the two artists, and its production was full of showdowns and face offs. Their rivalry was so strong, it was even compared to that of Nora Aunor and Vilma Santos. She has also performed Heaven singles on MTV Live and on the first ever MYX Mo!, where she performed a clear live whistle on the song that surprised the audience.
