= Sarah Jane Abad =

Filipino former actress

- Born: July 10, 1986 (age 39); Philippines
- Occupation: Actress
- Years active: 1993–1996; 2013–present
- Spouse: Jay Contreras (m. 2009; sep. 2020)
- Children: 2
- Relatives: Kaye Abad (sister)

Sarah Jane Abad (born July 10, 1986), is a Filipino actress and former child actress.

== Career ==
Abad's first film role was in "Kung Ako'y Iiwan Mo" in 1993, where she played one of the three children of Gabby Concepcion and Lorna Tolentino's characters. Both Abad and older sister Kaye Abad auditioned for the role, the older sibling was originally picked for the role but Abad had to take over when the role of the father was recast. For the said role, she was awarded Best Child Performer in the 19th Metro Manila Film Festival. Abad is mostly remembered in Kung Mawawala Ka Pa, where she played the leukemia-stricken Charina, daughter to Christopher de Leon and Dawn Zulueta's characters.

In 1994, Abad appeared in the action comedy film Tunay Na Magkaibigan, Walang Iwanan...Peksman! with Vic Sotto and Phillip Salvador.

By the early 2000s, Abad had retired from the entertainment industry to focus on her education.

In recent years, she had appearances in the films We Will Not Die Tonight, Bloody Crayons and Historiographika Errata.

== Personal life ==
Abad's older sister is actor Kaye Abad.

Abad was formerly married to Kamikazee frontman Jay Contreras. The couple married in a black-themed wedding in January 2009. Abad confirmed the separation in an Instagram story in May 2020. However, Abad revealed that she and Contreras have remained friends and are co-parents to children Kidlat Caio and Isla Euan.

== Filmography ==
=== Television ===
Year	Title	Role	Notes	Ref.
1994	Maalaala Mo Kaya	Grace	Episode: "Tsokolate, Manika, at Libro"	
1995–1996	Kadenang Kristal	Ruth		
2019	Ang Probinsyano	Snooki		
2019	Los Bastardos	Nina		
2023	Batang Quiapo	Yana		

=== Film ===
Year	Title	Role	Notes	Ref.
1993	Kung Ako'y Iiwan Mo			
1993	Kung Mawawala Ka Pa	Charina		
1994	Tunay Na Magkaibigan, Walang Iwanan...Peksman!	Angela		
1994	Ang Ika-Labing Isang Utos: Mahalin Mo, Asawa Mo	Young Carmina		
1994	Wanted: Perfect Father	Mica		
1995	Bukas Bibitayin si Itay	Gigi Salvador		
1996	Bakit May Kahapon Pa?	Young Karina		
2017	Bloody Crayons	Benilda		
2017	Historiographika Errata		Credited as "Sarah Abad"	
2018	We Will Not Die Tonight	Tanya	Credited as "Sarah Abad"	
2022	Deleter	The Grey Woman		
2024	Crosspoint	Melanie Hidalgo		

=== Music videos ===
Year	Title	Artist(s)	Role	Notes	Ref.
2013	"Hindi Mo Nadinig"	Gloc-9 feat. Jay Durias	Girlfriend	Credited as "Sarah Abad-Contreras"	

== Awards and nominations ==
Year	Work	Organization	Category	Result	Source
1993	Kung Mawawala Ka Pa	Metro Manila Film Festival	Best Child Performer	Won	
1994	Kung Mawawala Ka Pa	FAMAS Awards	Best Child Performer	Won	
1995	Ang Ika-Labing Isang Utos: Mahalin Mo, Asawa Mo	FAMAS Awards	Best Child Actor	Nominated	
1996	Bukas Bibitayin si Itay	FAMAS Awards	Best Child Actor	Nominated	
