= Heaven (Nina Girado song) =

Single by Nina

from the album Heaven
- Released: August 2002
- Genre: Pop; R&B
- Length: 4:03 (original version); 4:12 (official remix)
- Label: Warner Music Philippines
- Songwriters: Brett Laurence; Gary Haase
- Producer: Ferdie Marquez

Nina singles chronology
"Heaven" (2002)	"2nd Floor" (2002)

"Heaven" is a song by Filipino singer Nina from her 2002 debut album of the same name. It was released as the album's first commercial single, and her first single as an artist, in August 2002 along with the album by Warner Music Philippines. The song was written by Brett Laurence and Gary Haase, and produced by Ferdie Marquez. The song is heavily influenced by the international urban sound, and Nina is one of the first pop-R&B artists to have entered the Philippine music scene. It was considered to be risky for Warner to release, since OPM music at that time focused on ballads and love songs, making the song a rare record during its release.

Upon release, the song and the album were met with critical acclaim, with most critics pointing out the international sound and smooth production as well as Nina's wide vocal range. Manila Bulletin described it as "a groovy breakthrough, boasting of an international-sounding music and voice, sung by a young Filipina talent". It was not a huge commercial hit, but it enabled Nina to break through the music scene. On August 20, 2002, the song was made available on digital download through iTunes and Amazon.com MP3 Download on January 23, 2007.

== Background and release ==
At seventeen, Nina became a vocalist of the XS, The Big Thing, MYMP, Silk and lastly, the Essence. After college, she recorded an amateur demo CD with the help of a friend. It was composed of three tracks, including the Steve Perry song "Foolish Heart", "Breathe Again" and "Against All Odds (Take a Look at Me Now)", recorded in a home studio with only a guitar for accompaniment. After listening to the demos, Warner Music Philippines managing director at that time, Ricky Ilacad wanted to sign her up even without seeing or hearing her in person. Two months after her father died of heart attack in the United States, she signed her first contract with Warner Music. Under the direction of Warner managing head Ilacad, foreign songwriters and arrangers from the United States and Korea, including Shelly Peiken and Brett Laurence, were hired for the production of the album. The album is heavily influenced by jazzy lounge pop-R&B and composed of songs that are reminiscent to the sound of international records at that time.

The song was released in the third quarter of 2002, and proved risky for Warner Music to breakthrough an artist such as Nina who is extremely influenced with R&B. The song was considered to be one of the first R&B-hip-hop inspired tracks in the Philippine music scene, which was rare for Filipino acts at that time. The song was not a commercial hit, but it exposed Nina's potential in the music scene.

== Music videos ==
Nina in the music video.

"Heaven" is Nina's first music video as an artist. It was directed by filmmaker Avid Liongoren. The video for "Heaven" is considerably plotless. It depicts Nina in a series of beauty shots, singing as there are special effects introduced in the music video. Blue animated background can be seen moving and in transition behind her.

=== Remix version ===
A remix version was commissioned by Warner Music to boost up promotion of the single. The remix features labelmate Artstrong, who contributed a rap verse, which he wrote himself. Retaining the same melody and lyric, the song differed in beat and rhythm, becoming heavily inspired by dark, hip-hop beats, distancing from music similar to fellow contemporaries like Kyla and Arnee Hidalgo. Additional footage from Artstrong and Nina were included to differentiate the original version from the remix version.

== Live performances ==
Heaven was the first album of Nina as a debut artist, making her unfamiliar to everyone at that time. To gain fans and promote her album, she has done concert performances, bar gigs and TV appearances. In 2002, she was featured in an episode of MYX Live!, hosted by Rico Blanco, where she performed a few songs from the album. She also sang her own versions of "Through the Fire", "It Might Be You", and Mariah Carey's "Never Too Far" and "Through the Rain". In 2003, she had a back-to-back major concert with Kyla entitled Cold War at Ratsky Morato. The concert began when rivalry sparked between the two artists, and its production was full of showdowns and face-offs. Their rivalry was so strong, it was even compared to that of Nora Aunor and Vilma Santos. She has also performed Heaven singles on MTV Live and on the first ever MYX Mo!.

== Official versions ==
Version	Length	Album
Album version	4:03	Heaven
Boywonder Remix (featuring Artstrong)	4:12	Heaven
Angel 31 Remix	4:47	Nina in the Mix: The Dense Modesto Remixes

== Credits and personnel ==
Credits taken from Heaven's liner notes.

- Artstrong Clarion - rap vocals, songwriter (remix version)
- Nina Girado - vocals
- Garry Haase - songwriter
- Brett Laurence - songwriter
- Lowkey - producer (remix version)
- Ferdie Marquez - producer
