= MTV Pilipinas for Favorite Group Video =

Philippine music award

The following is a list of MTV Pilipinas winners for Favorite Group Video.

Year	Artist	Video	Reference
2006	Rivermaya	Sunday Driving	
2005	Rivermaya	You'll Be Safe Here	
2004	Bamboo	Noypi	
2003	Rivermaya	Wag Na Init Ulo Baby	
2002	Rivermaya	Umaaraw, Umuulan	
2001	Parokya ni Edgar	Inuman Na	
2000	Parokya ni Edgar	Picha Pie	
1999	Parokya ni Edgar	Harana	
