= MTV Pilipinas for Best Director =

Philippine music award

The following is a list of MTV Pilipinas winners for Best Director.

Year	Artist	Video	Director	Reference
2006	Sandwich	Sugod	Marie Jamora	
2005	Radioactive Sago Project	Astro	R.A. Rivera	
2004	Barbie's Cradle	Everyday	Avid Liongoren	
2003	Slapshock	Numb	Team Manila	
2002	Rivermaya	Umaaraw, Umuulan	Lyle Sacris	
2001	Chicosci	Sink or Swim	Lyle Sacris	
