= MTV Pilipinas for Favorite International Video =

Philippine music award

The following is a list of MTV Pilipinas winners for Favorite International Video.

Year	Artist	Video	Reference
2006	Green Day	Wake Me Up When September Ends	
2005^{1}	--	--	
2004	The Black Eyed Peas	Where Is The Love?	
