= Ang Ika-Labing Isang Utos: Mahalin Mo, Asawa Mo =

1994 drama film by Marilou Diaz-Abaya

Ang Ika-Labing Isang Utos: Mahalin Mo Asawa Mo
- Official movie poster
- Directed by: Marilou Diaz-Abaya
- Screenplay by: Jose "Butch" Dalisay
- Produced by: Simon C. Ongpin
- Starring: Aiko Melendez; Gabby Concepcion; Zsa Zsa Padilla; Maricel Laxa; Edu Manzano
- Cinematography: Charlie Peralta
- Edited by: George Jarlego
- Music by: Nonong Buencamino
- Production companies: Regal Films; Star Cinema
- Distributed by: Star Cinema
- Release date: 16 November 1994
- Running time: 112 minutes
- Country: Philippines
- Language: Filipino

Ang Ika-Labing Isang Utos: Mahalin Mo, Asawa Mo (transl. The Eleventh Commandment: Love Thy Spouse) is a 1994 Philippine drama film directed by Marilou Diaz-Abaya from a screenplay written by Jose "Butch" Dalisay. Starring Aiko Melendez, Gabby Concepcion, Zsa Zsa Padilla, Maricel Laxa, and Edu Manzano, the film revolves around a woman who became a victim of domestic violence committed by her husband. It is one of the films directed by Diaz-Abaya that depicts issues about the plight of women who became victims of abuse and violence.

A co-production of Regal Films and Star Cinema, the film was theatrically released on 16 November 1994. It is the first film of Marilou Diaz-Abaya for Star Cinema, ABS-CBN's film production division, and her second film since her return to film directing in 1993.

== Plot ==
Married couple Soledad and Roy moved to a new house located near the slums and row houses. Soledad's beauty draws the attention of everyone, and when people flock to see her taking a bath, Roy beats her, believing that she ventured into prostitution. Soledad denies doing that. One night, when Roy returns home from an unsuccessful application as an entertainer in Japan, Roy beats her again. The raucous attracted the attention of their neighbors, including Sylvia, who became concerned with the violent situation.

When Roy returns home, he notices Soledad wearing new clothes. When learning that she got it from Sylvia, Roy becomes angered and beats her again. That situation again attracted the attention of the neighbors, and this time, Tony went to the scene.

One night, Roy, who was drunk, went to Tony and Sylvia's house and asked them where his wife, Soledad, was. Tony, with a gun in his hand, goes outside, tells Roy that Soledad is not in their house, and threatens him not to come again. On the following night, Roy shows up and asks them for forgiveness.

While in a drinking session with his friends, Roy angrily beats him for an offensive joke about women. When he returns home drunk, Roy beats Soledad again after she tells him about the idea of working for Tony and moving out to the other house. After she experienced countless beatings and then injured Roy by ironing his hand, Soledad goes to Sylvia for help again. With her showing up, Tony decides to report a case of domestic violence to the police station.

Roy trespasses into Thelma's house to get Soledad back, but Thelma violently confronts Roy until he accidentally kills her.

Roy chases the three until his motorcycle crashes and meets his demise. Soledad gives birth to a baby girl and names her Thelma, with the help of Susan and Sylvia. However, policemen came, and Soledad, Susan, and Sylvia were arrested for the murder of Roy. They stood trial for his murder, but Soledad asked the court to tell her story. She then confessed that she was the one who murdered Roy. While she's seeing Roy trying to kill Susan and Sylvia, Soledad took the chain and strangled Roy. Soledad, Susan, and Sylvia were later acquitted by the court, considering they killed Roy in self-defense.

== Cast ==
- Aiko Melendez as Soledad "Sol" Manarang, the battered wife
- Gabby Concepcion as Roy Manarang, an entertainer and a batterer
- Edu Manzano as Tony Tecson, a lawyer
- Maricel Laxa as Sylvia Tecson, a housewife who becomes concerned with Soledad being battered by Roy
- Zsa Zsa Padilla as Susan, a social worker at the crisis center
- Barbara Perez as Thelma Sandoval, head of the crisis center for battered women
- Sarah Jane Abad as Lorie Tecson, Tony and Sylvia's daughter
- Khristine Velasquez as Haydee
- Renato del Prado as Turing
- Tony Mabesa as Priest
- Chot Kabigting as Prosecutor
- Romy Romulo as Desk Sergeant
- Len Ag-Santos as TV host
- Chie Concepcion as Bastard Wife
- Ronnie Quizon, Butch Elizalde, and Alvin Soriano as Combo Members

== Production ==
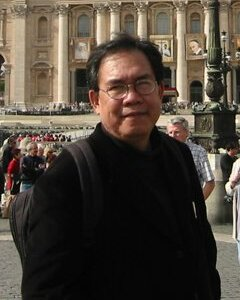
Jose Dalisay Jr. (pictured in 2007) wrote the screenplay.

Satisfied with the box office results of Kung Ako'y Iiwan Mo in 1993, Regal Films founder and executive producer, Lily Y. Monteverde, offered director Marilou Diaz-Abaya another film project about a failed marriage. While the previous film she directed is an observation of the shortcomings of a married upper-middle-class couple, she decides to direct a film that revolves around a battered and abused wife.

The film includes the involvement of Star Cinema, the film production division of ABS-CBN Broadcasting Corporation under the helm of its executive producer Charo Santos-Concio, and serves as a co-producer.

== Reception ==
=== Critical response ===
Mario E. Bautista, writing for Movie Flash, gave the film a mixed review, citing the film's good setup in the first half being undermined by the excessively vicious character of Roy, unconvincing plot developments, and character relationships that lack chemistry. He unfavorably compared it to director Marilou Diaz-Abaya's earlier film about domestic violence, Brutal (1980), but praised the performances of Aiko Melendez and Gabby Concepcion, deeming the latter two to have given superior performances compared to their respective nominated work in Maalaala Mo Kaya: The Movie and Loretta at the 1994 Manila Film Festival.

=== Accolades ===
Accolades received by Ang Ika-Labing Isang Utos: Mahalin Mo, Asawa Mo
Year	Award	Category	Recipient(s)	Result
1995	FAMAS Awards	Best Supporting Actress	Maricel Laxa	Nominated
1995	FAMAS Awards	Best Child Actress	Sarah Jane Abad	Nominated
