= Ric Segreto =

Filipino-American singer-songwriter

- Born: Richard Vincent Macaraeg (Note: Ric Segreto was born in the United States of America. Thus, he does not possess his mother's maiden name which is Segreto.); September 27, 1952; Brooklyn, New York City, U.S.
- Died: September 6, 1998 (aged 45) Makati, Philippines
- Occupations: Singer-songwriter; actor; teacher; journalist; historian
- Years active: 1974–1998
- Label: Vicor Music

Richard Vincent Macaraeg (September 27, 1952 – September 6, 1998), better known as Ric Segreto, was an American-born Filipino singer, songwriter, actor, teacher, journalist and historian, who became popular in the Philippines.

== Early life ==
Macaraeg was born in Brooklyn, New York City to Bridget Segreto, an Italian-American and Godofredo G. Macaraeg, a Filipino. Ric, the second son of five brothers and one sister was raised for the first five years of his life in New York by his mother, a dietician at a New York hospital and his father, an abdominal surgeon.

Macaraeg's father, born in Malasiqui, Pangasinan and educated at the University of Santo Tomas in Manila, was a medic with the rank of captain in the Philippine Army during World War II. He was captured by Japanese soldiers and made to march in the Bataan Death March and was imprisoned on Corregidor Island. After the War, Dr. Macaraeg traveled to the United States and attended Johns Hopkins University. Dr. Macaraeg was the first Filipino diplomate to the F.A.C.S.

Both Macaraeg's parents' love for music influenced his interest in music and singing. The family moved to the Philippines in 1957, where his father set up a physician's practice. Macaraeg went to Lourdes School of Quezon City. In 1959, the family relocated to Guam, where growing up in a milder environment furthered Macaraeg's interest in performing arts. He played in a rock band with his elder brother Gordon, aged 12 and 13, and with grandsons of Filipino composer Nicanor Abelardo. Macaraeg's band, the Asteroids, played in bars patronized by military personnel.

Macaraeg was later sent back to the Philippines to attend high school at the Ateneo de Manila. While there, he became friends with Lito de Joya, Sonny Santiago, Gus Cosio, Renato Garcia, Chito Kintanar, Kenny Barton, Bruce Brown, Butch Dans, Kinjo Sawada, Goff Macaraeg, Doden Besa, Jim Paredes, and Boboy Garovillo, who would become the band Apo Hiking Society. After a year at the Ateneo, Macaraeg returned to Guam. He then formed another band that included his brother Goff, Victor James, Dean Sampaio, and Joe Guererro, called the Salvation Army, singing and playing all over the island during weekends until he completed his high school. Macaraeg then went to college in the States, choosing Creighton University in Omaha, Nebraska, where he majored in history. During his college years, Macaraeg played in bar bands for military service men in Bellevue, Nebraska (home to Offutt Air Force Base) and acted in college plays.

== Early career ==
After graduation in 1974 at the age of 22, he toured the US with a show band, singing and playing bass guitar at Mountain Shadows in Scottsdale, Arizona, Harvey's in Reno and clubs in Las Vegas, Nevada. Meeting up with another show band bound for Japan out of San Diego, California, Macaraeg played for Japanese audiences during the early 1980s.

== Later career ==
Yearning to reconnect with his Filipino roots, Segreto left Japan and went back to the Philippines. He played in a few clubs singing until he was discovered by the Vicor record company. His first hit, "Kahit Konting Pagtingin" in 1982, was an immediate favorite and launched his career as a Filipino recording artist, performing on many television shows and in concerts, both locally and overseas.

== Teaching and journalism ==
Segreto was also a teacher and a writer. He taught history to high school students in Guam. He submitted sociology articles to local Philippine magazine, MAN Magazine, after returning to the Philippines to record another album. Segreto also worked on a thesis on the Philippine music industry.

While teaching in Guam, Segreto supplemented his free time performing in local beach bars and night clubs with his younger brother Gordon, in a band called the Bunelos Brothers (name provided by Gordon). The Bunelos Brothers were a regular feature at Tahiti Rama, Barney's Beach House and The Signature Pub. Their repertoire consisted mainly of Beatles music, easy listening tunes and ballads. They played together for 3 years going through an assortment of other members, including their eldest brother Goff.

== Death ==
On September 6, 1998, at around 12:15 PM, Segreto was riding his motorcycle from his home in Makati. He was killed in an accident over the then-under-construction Makati–Buendia Flyover bridgeway, when he either ran into or was hit by a steel bar. He died two days after fellow singer Willy Garte, who also died in an accident after being run over by a truck. He was 3 weeks short of his 46th birthday.

He was survived by his wife Erica and their son Darby Macaraeg.

He was buried in San Ildefonso Catholic Cemetery in Malasiqui, Pangasinan.

== Discography ==
At the time Segreto's career took off, the trend in the Philippines had shifted back to original English-language Filipino songs. He collaborated with Levi Celerio, Odette Quesada, Bodjie Dasig, Gerry Paraiso and Amado Trivino.

Segreto recorded four original albums, Segreto, Man of the Hour, Always on My Mind and A Place In Your Heart. Since then, there have been several compilation albums released.

Songs he released during his career include:

- "Kahit Konting Pagtingin"
- "Don't Know What to Say (Don't Know What to Do)"
- "Give Me a Chance"
- "Touched by the Rainbow"
- "Angela"
- "Come Back to Me"
- "Do Ya, Do Ya Ever, Do Ya?"
- "Man of the Hour"
- "Hold On to My Love"
- "All I Wanna Do"
- "Slippin' Away"
- "Even Just Once More"
- "Stay"
- "I Need You"
- "I Thought She Was You"
- "Since You Said Goodbye"
- "Nang Dahil Sa Iyo"
- "Labis Din Kaya?"
- "Dasal"
- "Loving You"
- "Sana Ay Malaman Mo"
- "Don't Hurt The One You Love"
- "Hindi na Lang"

Segreto can also be heard doing back-up vocals for the band RP (Rock Project) for Bob Aves and Goff Macaraeg for the song "Run".

== Filmography ==
- May Minamahal (1993) as himself / performer of "Don't Know What to Do (Don't Know What to Say)" a.k.a. "Hopeless Romantic"
- Nine Deaths of the Ninja (1985) as PC Trooper
- Missing in Action (1984) as GI
