= Romantico (Kamikazee album) =

Studio album by Kamikazee
- Released: March 2012 (Philippines)
- Genre: Pop-punk, alternative rock
- Length: 50:27
- Language: Tagalog
- Label: Universal
- Producer: Eric Perlas

Kamikazee chronology
Long Time Noisy (2009)	Romantico (2012)

Singles from Romantico
- 1. "Halik" Released: November 9, 2011; 2. "Tagpuan" Released: February 3, 2012; 3. "Huling Sayaw (Featuring Kyla)" Released: April 2012; 4. "Wo-Oh" Released: January 20, 2013

Promotional CD Cover

Romantico is the fourth studio album from the Filipino rock band, Kamikazee. It has 14 tracks and released under Universal Records in March 2012 and released on iTunes on April 12, 2012. An 8-track promotional CD was released on October 14, 2011. This was Kamikazee's final studio album before going on hiatus beginning 2016.

The album spawned four singles: "Halik" ("Kiss"), "Tagpuan" ("Meeting Place"), "Huling Sayaw" ("Last Dance"), and "Wo-Oh". "Huling Sayaw", which featured R&B Royalty Kyla, won "Favorite Rock Video" at the 8th MYX Music Awards. It was also nominated for "Favorite Collaboration".

== Track listing ==
All songs written by Kamikazee except "If You're Not Here" written by Menudo and "Tamis" written by ConcreteSam.

Main CD
No.	Title	Length
1.	"Halik"	3:41
2.	"T.N.T."	1:39
3.	"Tamis" (featuring Choko Abejo of Conrete Sam)	3:45
4.	"Tagpuan"	4:15
5.	"Sana"	3:32
6.	"Sobrang Lungkot"	0:20
7.	"Kislap"	3:44
8.	"Wo-Oh"	3:07
9.	"If You're Not Here" (Featuring Chris Padilla of Hilera and Steve Badiola of Typecast)	4:26
10.	"Paano"	4:27
11.	"Huling Sayaw" (Featuring Kyla)	4:55
12.	"Halik (Acoustic Version)" (hidden track)	3:58
13.	"Tagpuan (Acoustic Version)" (hidden track)	4:18
14.	"Huling Sayaw (Acoustic Version)" (hidden track)	4:20
Total length:		50:27

Promo CD
No.	Title	Length
1.	"Sana"	3:32
2.	"Halik"	3:41
3.	"Kislap"	3:44
4.	"Tagpuan"	4:15
5.	"T.N.T."	2:28
6.	"Teka Teka"	2:24
7.	"Sobrang Lungkot"	0:20
8.	"Paano"	4:24
Total length:		24:55

== Personnel ==
- Jay Contreras (vocals)
- Jomal Linao (guitars/backing vocals)
- Led Tuyay (guitars/backing vocals)
- Puto Astete (bass)
- Bords Burdeos (drums)
