= Kamikazee (album) =

Studio album by Kamikazee
- Released: September 6, 2002; June 17, 2006 (Repackaged Edition)
- Genres: Hardcore punk, pop-punk, Nu-metal
- Label: Warner Music Philippines
- Producer: Parokya Ni Edgar

Kamikazee chronology
Kamikazee (2002)	Maharot (2006)

Singles from Kamikazee
- 1. "Ung Tagalog" Released: 2002; 2. "Lucky" Released: 2003; 3. "Girlfriend" Released: 2004

Kamikazee is the debut album from Filipino rock band, Kamikazee. It has ten tracks and is released under Warner Music in 2002. This was their only album released under Warner Music.

== Track listing ==
No.	Title	Length
1.	"Ung Tagalog"	5:23
2.	"Lucky" (Britney Spears cover)"	3:33
3.	"Chinelas"	3:14
4.	"Mmm Sarap"	5:40
5.	"Girl Friend"	5:01
6.	"Rocky Jr"	3:34
7.	"Ikaw Parin Pala"	5:26
8.	"Sana Kahit Minsan" (Ariel Rivera cover)"	3:38
9.	"Ert"	4:15
10.	"Turon"	3:10

== Personnel ==
- Jay Contreras (vocals)
- Jomal Linao (guitars/backing vocals)
- Led Tuyay (guitars)
- Puto Astete (bass)
- Bords Burdeos (drums)
