= Maharot =

Studio album by Kamikazee
- Released: January 16, 2006; June 19, 2006 (Repackaged Edition)
- Recorded: 2005
- Studios: Tracks Studios; Sonic State
- Genres: Post-hardcore, alternative rock, pop-punk, hardcore punk, nu metal
- Label: Universal
- Producer: Jomal Linao

Kamikazee chronology
Kamikazee (2002)	Maharot (2006)	Long Time Noisy (2009)

Singles from Maharot
- 1. "Chiksilog" Released: 2005; 2. "Sobrang Init" Released: 2005; 3. "Narda" Released: January 15, 2006; 4. "Mundo Ng Komiks" Released: February 11, 2006; 5. "First Day High" Released: April 29, 2006; 6. "Martyr Nyebera" Released: July 1, 2006; 7. "Ambisyoso" Released: November 13, 2006; 8. "Seksi! Seksi!" Released: 2006; 9. "Director's Cut" Released: 2006

Maharot is the second studio album by the Filipino rock band Kamikazee, released on January 16, 2006. It also is their first album under Universal Records. In May 2009 the album attained Double Platinum Award. The song "First Day High" was used as a soundtrack to the movie with the movie First Day High.

== Track listing ==
All tracks are written by Kamikazee, except where noted.

No.	Title	Writer(s)	Length
1.	"Director's Cut"		4:50
2.	"Seksi! Seksi!"		4:10
3.	"Martyr Nyebera (pun of Martin Nievera) (+ SpongeJoseph SquarePants)"	co-written by Chito Miranda, Kaye Abad	5:25
4.	"Narda"		4:45
5.	"Chiksilog"		3:59
6.	"Sobrang Init"		4:19
7.	"A.I.D.S."		3:52
8.	"Shoot Dat Bol"		4:01
9.	"Ambisyoso"		4:09
10.	"Diskoskwela + Is This A Showdown"		5:48
11.	"Petix"		4:00
12.	"My Tender Bear"		3:45
13.	"Apir Day"		2:45
14.	"K.K.K. + Pepeng Maghapon"		6:44
15.	"Narda [Acoustic]"		4:42

Maharot Repackaged Edition
No.	Title	Length
16.	"First Day High"	3:01
17.	"Mundo Ng Komiks"	2:38
18.	"Ambisyoso (Acoustic)"	4:05

SpongeJoseph SquarePants: parody for the soundtrack of Nickelodeon show SpongeBob SquarePants

== Personnel ==
- Jay Contreras (vocals)
- Jomal Linao (guitars/backing vocals)
- Led Tuyay (guitars/backing vocals)
- Puto Astete (bass)
- Bords Burdeos (drums)

Additional Musicians:

- Kaye Abad - Additional Vocals (track 3)
- Bboy Garcia – turntables (track 11)
- Jonathan Ong - Additional Keyboards and samples

== Album Credits ==
- Executive Producer: Kathleen Dy-Go
- Album Design: Allan Bordeos
- Concept by: Kamikazee
- Photogtaphy by: Carina Altamonte
- Co-Produced by: Angee Rozul, Allan "Bords" Burdeos, Jonathan Ong, 8 Toleran
- All Instruments are recorded at: Tracks Records except (track 5,9,13,15) recorded at Sonic State
- All Vocals recorded at: Sonic State except (track 6,8,12) recorded at tracks studios
- Digitally Mastered by: Angee Rozul
