= Long Time Noisy =

Studio album by Kamikazee
- Released: May 2009
- Label: Universal Records Philippines

Kamikazee chronology
Maharot (2006)	Long Time Noisy (2009)	Romantico (2011)

Singles from Long Time Noisy
- 1. "Wala" Released: April 24, 2009; 2. "Hanggang Tingin" Released: August 10, 2009; 3. "Unang Tikim" Released: March 10, 2010; 4. "Alay" Released: August 11, 2010; 5. "Meron Akong Ano (Featuring Chito Miranda, Ian Tayo, Reg Rubio)" Released: January 19, 2011

Long Time Noisy, the third album from the Filipino rock band, Kamikazee. It has 20 tracks and released under Universal Records in 2009.

== Track listing ==
No.	Title	Length
1.	"Ikaw"	3:54
2.	"Hanggang Tingin"	4:39
3.	"Eschoos Me"	4:21
4.	"4:20"	4:22
5.	"Meron Akong Ano"	4:43
6.	"Balutin Mo Ako"	0:47
7.	"Wala"	5:26
8.	"Lalandiin"	4:06
9.	"Unang Tikim"	4:07
10.	"Alay"	3:44
11.	"Hot Mami"	6:05
12.	"I Love You Ninang"	0:04
13.	"Dragon Spa Super Head Charger Volume 4"	0:48
14.	"Caintaenyo"	0:08
15.	"M.M.K."	3:46
16.	"Chismosa"	4:15
17.	"Teyk Awts"	8:34
18.	"Huli Ka Balbon"	0:39
19.	"Me Na Me"	2:38
20.	"Isplakitengtenks"	9:29

== Personnel ==
- Jay Contreras (vocals)
- Jomal Linao (guitars/backing vocals)
- Led Tuyay (guitars/backing vocals)
- Puto Astete (bass)
- Bords Burdeos (drums)
