= MTV Pilipinas for Favorite New Artist in a Video =

Philippine music award

The following is a list of MTV Pilipinas winners for Favorite New Artist in a Video.

Year	Artist	Video	Reference
2006	Sitti	Para Sa Akin	
2005	Hale	Broken Sonnet	
2004	Bamboo	Noypi	
2003	Nina	Jealous	
2002	Karylle	Can't Live Without You	
2001	Kyla	Hanggang Ngayon	
2000	Freestyle	So Slow	
1999	Sun Valley's Crew	Everything's Gonna Be	
