= Kamikazee =

Filipino rock band

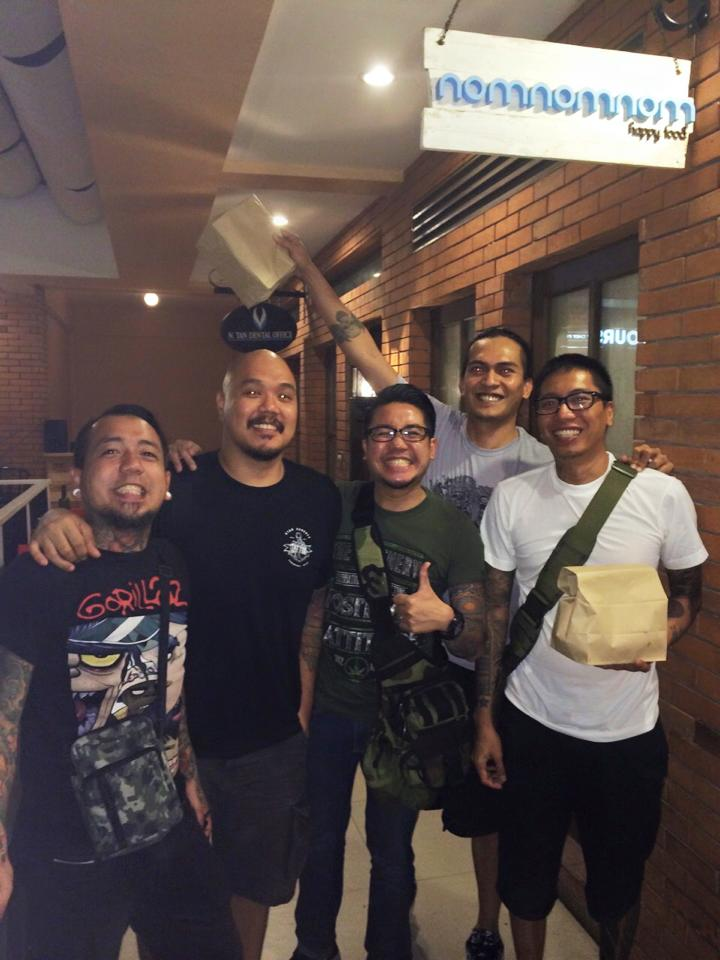
- from left to right: Contreras, Burdeos, Linao, Tuyay and Astete

Background information
- Origin: Quezon City, Philippines
- Genres: Alternative rock; nu metal; Pinoy rock; pop-punk; hard rock; hardcore punk; post-hardcore
- Years active: 2000–2015; 2017–present
- Labels: Warner Music; Universal (Philippines); Tower of Doom
- Members: Jay Contreras; Jomal Linao; Led Tuyay; Puto Astete; Bords Burdeos

Kamikazee (or sometimes stylized as KMKZ) is a Filipino rock band formed in 2000. The band, originally known all throughout its career as a quintet, is currently composed of Jay Contreras (lead vocals), Jomal Linao (lead guitar and vocals), Led Tuyay (guitar), Jason "Puto" Astete (bass), Allan "Bords" Burdeos (drums), Jian Lubiano (guitar), and Mikki Jill (keyboards & vocals).

Fans and critics have described the band's music as a mix of pop punk and hardcore punk.

In August 2015, the band had temporarily reunited after a brief hiatus announced earlier in January 2015. By the beginning of 2016, the band officially entered an indefinite hiatus. They played their farewell concert on December 10, 2015, at the Smart Araneta Coliseum. Around 2017, the band had a reunion gig and has been touring since.

== History ==
=== Formation and early years ===
The band originally started out with five members who met at the College of Fine Arts of the University of the Philippines, Diliman. Kamikazee's early gigs were mostly on-campus events in UP Diliman like the annual UP Fair. Before signing on to a major label, they went by the name "Kamikazee Cornflakes", eventually shortening the name to "Kamikazee". Their early shows included performances of the songs "Mmm Sarap", "Tsinelas", a cover of singer Ariel Rivera's "Sana Kahit Minsan", and Britney Spears' "Lucky".

Their live performances have since been known for using expletives, sexually suggestive dances, and references to genitalia. Despite such antics, their music incorporates many elements of modern rock music, such as pop-punk, grunge and nu metal on some of their songs. Band drummer Allan Burdeos was also recognized for his skill, which according to fans and critics, added extra flair to the band's songs.

Kamikazee released their first studio album in 2002. The album's carrier single was a heavy cover version of Britney Spears' Lucky. Other notable songs include Girlfriend, Ung Tagalog, Tsinelas and their cover of Ariel Rivera's Sana Kahit Minsan. In 2005, the band released Chiksilog as part of Rok On!, a multi-artist compilation album to promote Ragnarok Online.

=== Maharot and mainstream success ===
In 2006, they released their second album, Maharot. The carrier single of the album was Narda, which is about the fictional Philippine super hero Darna. Narda was a popular hit in 2006, and gained constant radio airplay in the same year, eventually becoming the band's signature song. The song was inspired by GMA Network's 2005 primetime show Darna which was based on the Mars Ravelo comic book series, and starred Angel Locsin. Later in 2009, it was re-used for GMA's Darna reboot with Marian Rivera now playing the title role. Maharot also resulted in the band incorporating other styles of music in composing tracks for the album, as evidenced by the metal-inspired riffs in the tracks Sobrang Init and KKK, the pop-punk styling of the songs "Director's Cut" and "Martyr Nyebera" (spoof or pun name of pop singer Martin Nievera) and the ska-sounding feel of Petix. Maharot was recognized for its sound, and further propelled the band to mainstream success.

The band maintains close ties with another popular Filipino band, Parokya ni Edgar (PNE). PNE frontman Chito Miranda met the band members in college. In concert events with both bands on the bill, one band's singer would occasionally jam with the other band. During Parokya ni Edgar's live sessions, Contreras frequently joined Miranda in performing songs such as "Okatokat", "Chikinini" and "The Yes Yes Show." In 2005, Contreras provided back-up vocals for PNE's hit song "The Order Taker" while co-member Linao provided lead guitar. In turn, Kaye Abad, Miranda's then-girlfriend, provided back-up vocals for Kamikazee's song "Martyr Nyebera". Contreras later married Kaye Abad's sister, Sarah, on February 12, 2009, at Paco Park.

In December 2008 when Kamikazee was set to perform at the Dubai Festival City in Dubai, United Arab Emirates as part of an international tour, guitarist Led Tuyay was arrested at the airport upon their arrival after a cannabis residue was found in his luggage. Tuyay was detained and deported back to Manila in January 2009.

=== Long Time Noisy and Romantico ===
Kamikazee's 3rd Album "Long Time Noisy" took the band three years to put together as the band balanced out their tough schedules. The album was recorded at Tower of Doom Studios with producer Eric Perlas. "Unang Tikim," one of the album's singles, was used in the TV Ad of RC Cola in 2011. The album's writing style and music retained elements from their previous work, mainly in song structure and subject matter such as everyday life, drug use, and personal experiences.

Kamikazee's fourth & recent album, "Romantico" was released after being in production for 3 years. The album contained the singles "Halik" & "Huling Sayaw" with RNB singer Kyla on guest vocals. "Romantico" was well-received, despite minor criticism from some fans regarding the change of musical style in the album. It contained a three-part trilogy, "Halik", "Tagpuan", and "Huling Sayaw" Before the main "Romantico" Cd release, they released a promotional cd.

=== 15th anniversary and indefinite hiatus ===
The band announced on January 25, 2015, that they would disband at the end of the year to pursue individual interests, although clarified that it was not a break up but merely a hiatus on band activities. The band told fans that they would surely see the band again in the future.

In August 2015 after a brief hiatus, the band performed a series of live performances dubbed as "Kamikazee XV" which marks their 15th anniversary in the OPM industry. Kamikazee held their last gig at the 12 Monkeys Music Hall & Pub in Makati as part of the "Kamikazee XV" concert series entitled Kamikazee Huling Sayaw (translated to Kamikazee The Last Dance) with Parokya ni Edgar's Chito Miranda as special guest. The band announced that they will formally enter into hiatus starting 2016. Their Huling Sayaw farewell concert was held at Smart Araneta Coliseum on December 10 which features other local bands and most notably singer Kyla.

=== Reunion and Tagpuan Tour (2017–present) ===
On August 20, 2017, The band announced on their Facebook page about their planned comeback through their statement: "Matagal na panahon. Magkikita muli...bagong kanta" meaning "Long time. We'll see each other again ... new song" and later set the date of release to be on December 9, 2017.

On November 11 Kamikazee announced a 2018 Tagpuan Tour inside and outside the Philippines via Facebook video. Cities/Countries included are Bulacan, Cavite, Baguio, Iloilo, Ilocos, Cebu, Lucena, Bicol, Laguna, Davao, Manila, Dubai, Singapore, U.S.A, and Canada. According to the band's teaser posters, the Tagpuan tour was set to kick off on December 9, 2017.

First confirmed date was March 16, 2018 – TagFest in Dubai. Kamikazee played alongside 6cyclemind, Moonstar88 and Teeth

Since December 9, 2017, Kamikazee have released two singles from their upcoming 2019 album: "Agimat" and "Leon".

In 2018, Kamikazee took part in a reunion tour around the Philippines, USA and Canada finally announcing on January 4, 2019, that they will tour again with Greyhoundz and Queso to USA, Canada and Philippines cities such as Iloilo, Manila, Cavite and Cebu.

Expanding as an ensemble, the group became a 7-piece band starting in 2020, adding Jian Lubiano of Catfight on guitar and Mikki Jill of FIONA on keyboards & vocals.

== Members ==
Current members

- Ferdinand Jay Contreras – lead vocals (2000–2015, 2017–present)
- Jose Ma. Luis "Jomal" Linao – lead guitar, vocals (2000–2015, 2017–present)
- Led Zeppelin Tuyay – rhythm and lead guitar (2000–2015, 2017–present); backing vocals (2000–2015, 2017–2020)
- Jason "Puto" Astete – bass guitar (2000–2015, 2017–present)
- Allan "Bords" Burdeos – drums, percussion (2000–2015, 2017–present)

Touring members

- Mark "Macoy" Estacio – drums (2019–present)
- Sep Roño (of Typecast) – drums (2022–present)

Former members

- Jianelli James "Jian" Lubiano – rhythm guitar (2020–2026, touring 2019–2020)
- Mikki Jill – keyboards, vocals (2020–2026)

== Discography ==
=== Studio albums ===
Year	Album
2002	Kamikazee
2006	Maharot
2009	Long Time Noisy
2012	Romantico
2019	Alab

=== Compilation album ===
Year	Album
2015	Their Greatest Hits

=== Collaboration albums ===
- Supersize Rock (Warner Music Philippines, 2004)
- Kami nAPO muna (Universal Records, 2006)
- The Biggest OPM Hits Of The Year SUPER (Universal Records, 2006)
- Rok On (Viva Records, 2005)
- Pinoy Ako 2 (Star Music, 2005)
- Palabas: The Best Of OPM TV & Movie Themes (Universal Records, 2006)
- Kami nAPO muna ulit (Universal Records, 2007)
- Another Biggest OPM Hits Of The Year SUPER 2 (Universal Records, 2007)
- Astig...The Biggest Band Hits (Universal Records, 2008)
- Super Astig Hits (Universal Records, 2016)

=== Singles ===
- From the album Kamikazee (2002)
  - "Ung Tagalog"
  - "Tsinelas"
  - "Girlfriend"
  - "Lucky" (cover from Britney Spears)
  - "Sana Kahit Minsan" (cover from Ariel Rivera)
- From the album Maharot (2006)
  - '"Chiksilog"
  - "Ambisyoso"
  - "Narda (song)"
  - "Martyr Nyebera"
  - "Seksi Seksi"
  - "Director's Cut"
  - "Doo Bidoo" (cover from "APO Hiking Society, 2007)
- From The Album Long Time Noisy (2009)
  - "Wala"
  - "Hanggang Tingin"
  - "Unang Tikim"
  - "Alay"
  - "Meron Akong Ano" (cover from the late Francis M, also features Biboy Garcia of Queso, Chito Miranda of Parokya ni Edgar, Reg Rubio of Greyhoundz and Ian Tayao of Queso/Wilabaliw)
- From the album Romantico (2012)
  - "Halik (Kamikazee song)"
  - "Tagpuan"
  - "Huling Sayaw" (feat. Kyla)
  - "Wo-Oh"
  - "Tamis"
  - "Kislap"

=== Other singles ===
- Originally taken Parokya Ni Edgar's album, "Halina Sa Parokya" (2005)
  - The Ordertaker (Feat. Parokya Ni Edgar)
- Theme song for First Day High film and Rexona commercial
  - "First Day High"
- From the album Kami nAPO Muna (2006)
  - "Doo Bidoo" – No. 1 Philippines
- Theme song for ABS-CBN's Komiks
  - "Komiks"

== Awards and nominations ==
Year	Award giving body	Category	Nominated work	Results
2003	MTV Pilipinas Music Awards	Video of the Year	"Lucky"	Won
2003	MTV Pilipinas Music Awards	Favorite New Artist	(for "Lucky")	Nominated
2003	MTV Pilipinas Music Awards	Best Director	(Avid Liongren for Lucky)	Nominated
2003	NU Rock Awards	Drummer of the Year	(for Allan Burdeos)	Won
2003	NU Rock Awards	Listener's Choice	—N/a	Won
2003	NU Rock Awards	Best New Artist	—N/a	Nominated
2003	NU Rock Awards	Artist of the Year	—N/a	Nominated
2003	NU Rock Awards	Album of the Year	"Kamikazee"	Nominated
2003	NU Rock Awards	Best Album Packaging	"Kamikazee"	Nominated
2003	NU Rock Awards	Best Music Video	"Lucky"	Nominated
2003	NU Rock Awards	Vocalist of the Year	(for Jay Contreras)	Nominated
2005	NU Rock Awards	Best Live Act	—N/a	Won
2005	NU Rock Awards	Song of the Year	"Chicksilog"	Nominated
2006	NU Rock Awards	Best Live Act	—N/a	Won
2006	NU Rock Awards	Song of the Year	"Narda"	Won
2006	NU Rock Awards	Artist/ Band of the Year	—N/a	Won
2006	NU Rock Awards	Listener's Choice	—N/a	Won
2006	NU Rock Awards	Vocalist of the Year	(for Jay Contreras)	Nominated
2006	NU Rock Awards	Guitarist of the Year	(for Jomal Linao)	Nominated
2006	NU Rock Awards	Drummer of the Year	(for Allan Burdeos)	Nominated
2006	NU Rock Awards	Best Male Award	(for Jay Contreras)	Nominated
2006	NU Rock Awards	Album of the Year	"Maharot"	Nominated
2006	NU Rock Awards	Best Album Packaging	Allan Burdeos for "Maharot"	Nominated
2006	NU Rock Awards	Best Music Video of the Year	"Martyr Nyebera"	Nominated
2006	NU Rock Awards	Best Music Video of the Year	"Doo Bidoo"	Nominated
2006	NU Rock Awards	Producer of the Year	(Angee Razul, Jonathan Ong, Allan Burdeos, 8 Toleran and Jomal Linao for "Maharot")	Nominated
2007	20th Awit Awards	Album of the Year	"Maharot"	Won
2007	20th Awit Awards	Song of the Year	"Narda	Won
2007	20th Awit Awards	Best Rock Recording	"Narda"	Won
2007	20th Awit Awards	Best Performance by a Group Artist	"Narda"	Won
2007	20th Awit Awards	Music Video of the Year	"Martyr Nyebera"	Won
2007	MYX Music Awards	Favorite Ringtone	"Narda"	Won
2007	MYX Music Awards	Favorite Music Video	"Martyr Nyebera"	Nominated
2007	MYX Music Awards	Favorite Music Video	"Doo Bidoo"	Nominated
2007	MYX Music Awards	Favorite Song	"Narda"	Nominated
2007	MYX Music Awards	Favorite Song	"Doo Bidoo"	Nominated
2007	MYX Music Awards	Favorite Artist	—N/a	Nominated
2007	MYX Music Awards	Favorite Group	—N/a	Nominated
2007	MYX Music Awards	Favorite Collaboration	"Ordertaker" with Parokya Ni Edgar	Nominated
2007	MYX Music Awards	Favorite Remake	"Doo Bidoo"	Nominated
2007	MYX Music Awards	Favorite Rock Video	"Doo Bidoo"	Nominated
2007	MYX Music Awards	Favorite Media Soundtrack	"First Day High" for Rexona, First Day High	Nominated
2008	MYX Music Awards	Favorite Rock Video	"Seksi Seksi"	Nominated
2009	NU Rock Awards	Drummer of the Year	(for Allan Burdeos)	Won
2009	NU Rock Awards	Artist of the Year	—N/a	Nominated
2009	NU Rock Awards	Album of the Year	"Long Time Noisy"	Nominated
2009	NU Rock Awards	Guitarist of the Year	(for Jomal Linao)	Nominated
2009	NU Rock Awards	Guitarist of the Year	(for Led Tuyay)	Nominated
2009	NU Rock Awards	Best Album Packaging	(Allan Burdeos & Ace Enriquez for "Long Time Noisy")	Nominated
