= MTV Pilipinas for Favorite Song =

Philippine music award

The following is a list of MTV Pilipinas winners for Best Song or Favorite Song, depending on what year the award was given. The last of this award was given out in 2005.

Year	Artist	Video	Reference
2005	Rivermaya	Balisong	
2004	Bamboo	Noypi	
2003	Regine Velasquez	Sa Aking Pag-iisa (Remix)	
2002	Parokya ni Edgar	Swimming Beach	
2001	Ogie Alcasid	Kahit Na	
