= Kyla (Filipino singer) =

Filipino singer and actress (born 1981)

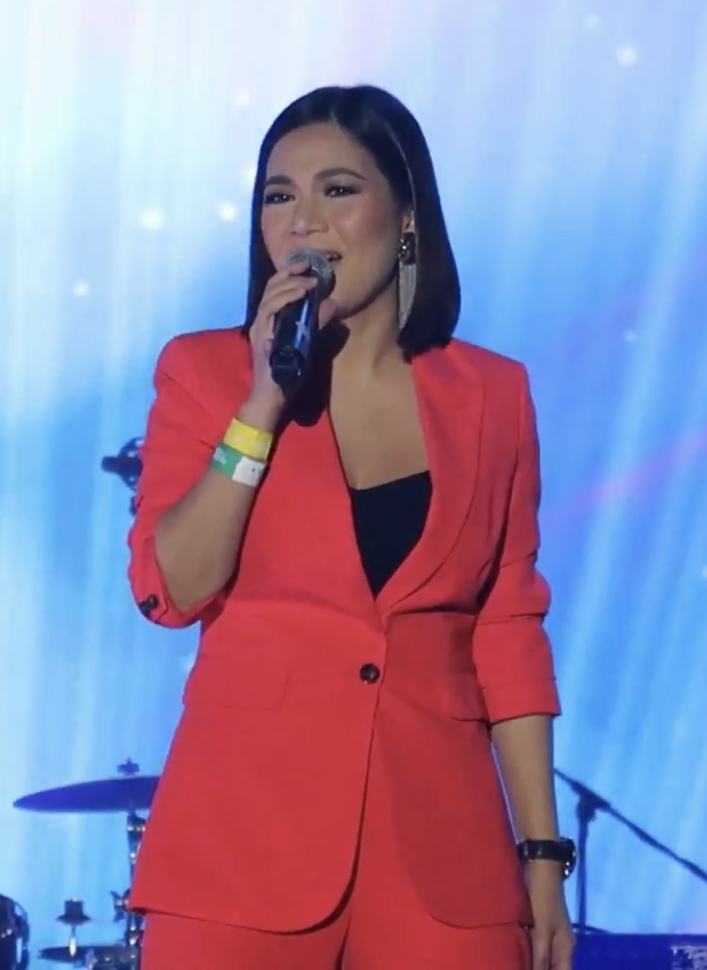
- Kyla in 2018
- Born: Melanie Hernandez Calumpad; January 5, 1981 (age 45)
- Occupations: Singer; actress; television personality
- Years active: 1995–present
- Works: Discography; songs
- Spouse: Rich Alvarez (m. 2011)
- Children: 1
- Awards: Full list
- Musical career
- Genres: OPM; R&B; soul; pop
- Instrument: Vocals
- Labels: EMI; PolyEast; Star Music

Kyla (born Melanie Hernandez Calumpad; January 5, 1981) is a Filipino singer, actress, and television personality. Known for her vocal range and melismatic singing style, she has been credited with helping to redefine R&B and soul music in the Philippines. Her sound became a catalyst in the growth and popularity of the music genres, making her a prominent pop culture figure. She has been cited by media outlets as the country's "Queen of R&B".

Kyla started performing in singing competitions as a child, and first gained recognition as a runner-up in the talent competition show Metropop Star Search in 1997. She signed with EMI Philippines and released her debut album Way to Your Heart (2000), supported by the single "Hanggang Ngayon", which won the International Viewer's Choice Award for Southeast Asia at the 2001 MTV Video Music Awards. Kyla began songwriting for her eponymous second album, which contained elements of soul and R&B. Kyla's I Will Be There (2003) featured English boy band Blue, and Not Your Ordinary Girl (2004) and Beautiful Days (2006) included tracks written by American singer-songwriter Keith Martin. Her succeeding releases were the cover albums Heartfelt (2007), and Heart 2 Heart (2009). Her next album, Private Affair (2010), featured the lead single "Don't Tie Me Down". After signing a new contract with Star Music in 2015, she released her ninth album The Queen of R&B (2018). Kyla's first seven records are all platinum-certified by the Philippine Association of the Record Industry.

Kyla made her acting debut with a guest appearance in the drama series Narito ang Puso Ko (2003). She followed this with parts in the television anthology series Magpakailanman (2003) and Dear Friend (2009). Her first major role was as the antagonist in the daytime soap opera Villa Quintana (2013–2014). Kyla expanded her career into reality television as a presenter of the talent competition show Popstar Kids (2005–2007) and as a judge in the variety show singing contest Tawag ng Tanghalan (2016). Her accolades include a MTV Video Music Award, three MTV Pilipinas Music Awards, a Star Award for Music, six Myx Music Awards, and eleven Awit Awards.

== Life and career ==
=== 1981–1999: Early life and Metropop Star Search ===
Melanie Hernandez Calumpad was born on January 5, 1981. The third of four children to Ulysses and Olivia Calumpad, she grew up with an older brother and two sisters. Her father, who worked as a lawyer, was a bassist and had aspired to be a folk performer. She began singing and taking voice lessons at age nine. Her interest in music and performing eventually led her to join several amateur singing contests. At age twelve, she auditioned for the television talent show Tanghalan ng Kampeon and won the competition, performing a cover of Jennifer Holliday's "I Am Changing". She then unsuccessfully auditioned for a role in the teen variety show Ang TV. At thirteen, she was cast as a performer in the musical variety show That's Entertainment. Looking back on her participation in the program in a 2003 interview, she remarked: "I was only a singer and never joined the acting skits."

In 1995, Kyla represented the Philippines at the Yamaha Music Quest in Tokyo. She later shifted to performing in hotels and bars before becoming the lead vocalist of a local band, named Heat of the Night, in 1996. This led her to relocate to Brunei to pursue a career as part of the group; her father resigned from his job to support her. The following year, she was a finalist in the reality singing competition Metropop Star Search, placing third. Soon after, her early attempts to launch her solo music career floundered when she was turned down by several record labels. No other opportunities materialized until early 2000, when she was selected by songwriter Raymund Ryan to record his track "One More Try" for the Metropop Song Festival. While she failed to place in the competition, Kyla caught the attention of producer Francis Guevarra, who expressed interest and submitted her demo tape to music executive Chito Ilacad. After listening to her tape, Ilacad signed her to EMI Philippines. She adopted the stage name Kyla at the suggestion of Ilacad, who thought that it was memorable.

=== 2000–2003: Way to Your Heart and breakthrough ===
Kyla's debut studio album Way to Your Heart, containing the lead single "Bring It On", was released in 2000. The album received considerable attention for its R&B and soul influence, and was described as a breakthrough in local music by critics. (Note: Attributed to multiple references:) Arnie Mendaros wrote eight of the album's tracks, including the second single "Hanggang Ngayon", which was released in January 2001. The song's lyrics express a hopeful revival of a couple's faded romance after their parting. The music video for "Hanggang Ngayon" won the International Viewer's Choice Award for Southeast Asia at the 2001 MTV Video Music Awards. Kyla won multiple accolades for Way to Your Heart, including the Awit Awards for Best Performance by a New Female Recording Artist and Music Video Performance of the Year. She also won the Aliw Award for Best New Artist and the Box Office Entertainment Award for Most Promising Female Artist. At the 2001 MTV Pilipinas Music Award, she was named Favorite New Artist in a Video, while "Hanggang Ngayon" won Video of the Year. The album received a platinum certification from the Philippine Association of the Record Industry (PARI). She then recorded the Jonathan Manalo-penned pop song "Tara Tena" for the songwriting competition Himig Handog sa Makabagong Kabataan, where it won first place.

Kyla's eponymous second album was released in March 2002. She wrote two tracks on the album, which features elements of "pop and ballad tunes", intertwined with her "R&B signature sound". She then featured in a duet with Gary Valenciano on his single "Can We Stop and Talk Awhile", released that same month. Kyla earned nominations at the MTV Pilipinas Music Awards, including Favorite Female Video and Favorite Song for the lead single "I Feel For You". At the 2003 MTV Asia Awards in January, she performed with English boy band Blue, and later collaborated with Irish singer Ronan Keating during the latter's headlining concert at the Araneta Coliseum the following month. Kyla made her acting debut with a guest role in the drama series Narito ang Puso Ko (2003). She followed this with a starring role in an episode of the anthology series Magpakailanman, portraying Sarah Geronimo, who became known for winning the inaugural season of the reality talent show Star for a Night.

On May 22, 2003, Kyla released "I Will Be There", the lead single from her third studio album of the same name. She worked with longtime collaborator Arnie Mendaros, as well as new songwriters such as Jamir Garcia, Janno Gibbs, and Radha. The album's title track was written by singer-songwriter Ogie Alcasid. On I Will Be There, Kyla also reunited with boy band Blue for the track "Flexin", and with Valenciano for a cover of his single "Sana Maulit Muli", which won Best Performance by a Duet at the 2004 Awit Awards. The single "I Will Find You" earned her the award for Best R&B Music at the same ceremony.

=== 2004–2009: Not Your Ordinary Girl and Beautiful Days ===
Not Your Ordinary Girl was released in May 2004. It was supported by the lead single "Human Nature", a cover of Michael Jackson's 1983 song. Kyla worked with American singer-songwriter and producer Keith Martin, who wrote four of the album's tracks, including the song "Because of You". A reviewer from The Philippine Star described the record as her best work thus far and referred to Kyla as an "R&B royalty". The critic Baby Gil, also from The Philippine Star, praised her musical style and highlighted the singer's "innate flair for R&B music". She, however, was critical of its lead single, saying, "I do not think Kyla has the chops to relate to it and make listeners understand the angst and sense of disappointment inherent in the song." In support of the album, Kyla headlined an arena concert at the Araneta Coliseum on November 12, 2004, featuring guest performers such as Regine Velasquez, Luke Mijares, and Nyoy Volante. The album earned a double platinum certification from PARI. Not Your Ordinary Girl received an Album of the Year nomination at the 2005 Awit Awards; the single "If The Feeling Is Gone" was nominated for Best Ballad Recording, while three other singles received nominations in the Best R&B Recording category.

In February 2005, Kyla and Jerome John Hughes released a single for the soundtrack of the romantic drama Let the Love Begin (2005). She then presented the reality television singing competition Popstar Kids, which premiered on November 13, 2005, on the QTV network. Media critic Nestor Torre Jr. of the Philippine Daily Inquirer felt she was unoriginal and likened her approach to that of Velasquez, who then-hosted a talent show with a similar format. In 2006, Kyla released Beautiful Days. On the album, she co-wrote the title track with Manalo and re-teamed with Martin, who contributed three songs. At the 2007 Awit Awards, "Beautiful Days" garnered a nomination for Best Ballad Recording.

At the second Manny Pacquiao vs. Marco Antonio Barrera boxing match on October 7, 2007, at the Mandalay Bay in Las Vegas, Kyla sang the Philippine national anthem. Later that month, she released a remake of Taylor Dayne's "Love Will Lead You Back", the lead single from her sixth studio album Heartfelt. A tribute album, it included her versions of Lani Hall's "I Don't Want You To Go", James Ingram's "I Don't Have the Heart", and Patti LaBelle's "Over the Rainbow", among others. Music critics appreciated Kyla's artistry and vocal performances; the Philippine Entertainment Portal journalist Bong Godinez wrote that she was "blossoming into a full-fledged performer who can give justice to both contemporary R&B numbers and classic standards". Gil of The Philippine Star regarded Heartfelt as a showcase of Kyla's musicality that resulted in a production which "flows neatly from one cut to another". She concluded, "This girl has R&B in her system and all those sweet undulating notes just seem to come naturally with so much charm." At the 2008 Myx Music Awards, "Love Will Lead You Back" won Favorite Remake, and "It's Over Now" was named Best Ballad Recording at the 2008 Awit Awards.

In collaboration with Chito Ilagan and Jay R, Kyla co-produced her seventh studio album Heart 2 Heart, released on November 25, 2008. As with Heartfelt, the record consisted mostly of cover versions, with three original tracks incorporated. In it, she co-wrote the songs "Back in Time" and "You Make Me Feel" with Jay R. The Philippine Star considered Heart 2 Heart as a mature production, and added that the album remained faithful to Kyla's core as an R&B artist. The album and its singles earned several nominations at the Star Awards for Music, Awit Awards, and Myx Music Awards; winning Favorite Song for "Back in Time" and Favorite Mellow Video for "Old Friend" at the latter ceremony. Kyla took on the leading role of a woman coerced into an arranged marriage in the television show Dear Friend: Three Bachelors, co-starring Jay R, Martin Escudero, and Jennica Garcia. An installment of the Dear Friend series, it premiered on September 27, 2009.

=== 2010–2014: Private Affair and Journey ===
To coincide with her ten-year career milestone, Kyla released Essence of Soul, a greatest hits compilation album issued as a double CD set in July 2010. The only original track, "Hanggang Wakas", featured Malaysian singer Hazami. During that period, she signed a regional record deal with Indonesian label Tarra Group, which saw her release re-recorded versions of her songs in Bahasa, as well as collaborate with local artists in the country. Concurrently, she began working on her next studio album. Titled Private Affair, the record saw Kyla collaborate with producers whom she had not worked with before. She collaborated with singer-songwriter duo Karel and Yosha Honasan for the track "Camouflage", and co-wrote the single "Don't Tie Me Down" with Billy Crawford, Kris Lawrence, Jay R and Jimmy Muna. Private Affair was released in December 2010. A shift from her allegiance to cover songs, as she did with her last two releases, the album gravitated towards jazz, urban, and new soul music. The writer Pocholo Concepcion from the Philippine Daily Inquirer lauded the album's sound as fresh and innovative, with praise centered on Kyla's collaboration with new and promising musicians. She received four nominations at the 2011 Awit Awards, winning Best Performance by a Female Artist. She was also nominated for the Star Award for Music's Album of the Year and Female Recording Artist of the Year.

Also in 2011, Kyla appeared in the dance drama series Time of My Life, starring Kris Bernal, Rocco Nacino, and Mark Herras. The following year, she performed as a guest during American singer-songwriter Brian McKnight's concert at the Araneta Coliseum on March 16, 2012. She then featured in rock band Kamikazee's "Huling Sayaw", a single from their album Romantico. A reviewer from the Philippine Daily Inquirer commended the song for its well-made metaphors, calling it a "savor-the-fleeting-moments scene". The music video for "Huling Sayaw" was named Best Rock Video at the 2013 Myx Music Awards.

The daytime soap opera Villa Quintana (2013), directed by Gina Alajar, was Kyla's first high-profile acting project. A remake of the 1995 series of the same name, the show is a modernized adaptation of the William Shakespeare tragedy Romeo and Juliet, which tells the story of two teenagers (played by Elmo Magalona and Janine Gutierrez) who fall in love despite being members of feuding families. She was cast as Ruby Quintana, the villainous wife of Marky Lopez's character, who seeks to thwart the lovers' relationship. Kyla found herself challenged by the idea of playing an unlikeable and manipulative woman, but said that certain aspects of her character's motivation as a mother drew her to the part. The series aired from November 2013 to June 2014.

Kyla's extended play (EP), Journey, was released in June 2014. She co-wrote two of the songs from the EP, including the title track, which was inspired by her experiences on marriage and motherhood. McKnight also composed and is featured in the track "My Heart", a song he had written for Kyla's wedding in 2011. Allan Policarpio of the Philippine Daily Inquirer complimented the EP's themes and Kyla's grown-up perspectives, while Gil from The Philippine Star was enthusiastic of her vocal performance and songwriting. At the 2015 Star Awards for Music, Journey was named R&B Album of the Year, and earned Kyla an R&B Artist of the Year nomination. The gospel song "Salbabida", written by Jungee Marcelo, was performed by Kyla for the 3rd Philippine Popular Music Festival, where it won the top honor. The single received four nominations at the 2015 Awit Awards, winning Best Rock/Alternative Recording.

=== 2015–present: Flying High and The Queen of R&B ===
Flying High was a headlining concert staged at the Kia Theater on November 20, 2015. A celebration of Kyla's fifteen-year career, the show featured guest performers such as KZ Tandingan, Darren Espanto, and Erik Santos. Journalists from The Philippine Star praised the concert's production value for its focus on Kyla's career trajectory and musical identity, underscoring her vocals and skill set. That year, she released a cover of Jeffrey Osborne's "On the Wings of Love" for the soundtrack of the series of the same name. The song won Favorite Remake and Favorite Media Soundtrack at the 2016 Myx Music Awards. In June 2016, Kyla became a judge on the amateur singing contest Tawag ng Tanghalan, which aired as a segment in the variety show It's Showtime. She then recorded the main theme for the romantic drama series Till I Met You (2016). In December, Kyla signed a new deal with Star Music, and began work on her subsequent record.

In 2018, Kyla released "Only Gonna Love You" and "Fix You and Me" as double lead singles from her tenth studio album The Queen of R&B. The former song featured English rapper REQ, with its accompanying music video directed by John Prats, Sam Milby, and Angelica Panganiban. The album and its singles received four nominations at the 2018 Star Awards for Music. In September 2018, she collaborated with Tandingan, Angeline Quinto, and Yeng Constantino for a concert with American vocal harmony group Boyz II Men at the Araneta Coliseum. Two years later, she co-wrote and recorded "Undeniable" with Jay R. In 2022, Kyla contributed to The Broken Marriage Vow soundtrack with "Init Sa Lamig", a song written by Daryl Ong.

== Artistry ==
=== Influences ===
Kyla grew up listening to artists such as Aretha Franklin, Whitney Houston, and Mariah Carey. Her musical inspiration varies from R&B singers such as Alicia Keys, Brandy, and Beyoncé to jazz artists like Ella Fitzgerald and Jennifer Holliday, as well as pop rock duo A Great Big World. She has been compared to Carey, whose songs she has frequently performed in her concerts and television appearances. She also admires Ashanti, saying, "Her music and style is unique", adding that she is "one of the best artists" in R&B music. Kyla was heavily influenced by Brian McKnight and says he inspired her to find her sound and musical identity early in her career.

During production of her 2002 eponymous album, Kyla cited influences from soul and R&B musicians, including K-Ci & JoJo, Ciara, and Boyz II Men, drawing inspiration for her songwriting. When recording her cover album Heartfelt, she paid tribute to the melodic styles of a variety of artists, including Luther Vandross, Patti LaBelle, James Ingram, and Michael Jackson, describing their music as "classic gems in pop". Kyla has also been influenced by many Filipino artists, specifically Lani Misalucha, Gary Valenciano, and Regine Velasquez. She paid homage to Velasquez by performing her song "Pangarap Ko Ang Ibigin Ka" during a co-headlining concert titled Divas: Live in Manila.

=== Musical style and themes ===
"Hanggang Ngayon" (2000)
"Hanggang Ngayon" became Kyla's breakthrough, and Way to Your Heart was regarded as "one of the first authentic R&B albums" produced by a Filipino artist. She is known for her melismatic singing style, incorporating breathy vocals and riffs.

Kyla's vocal style and singing ability have shaped Philippine popular and contemporary music. She has been cited by media publications as the country's "Queen of R&B", and is often credited with helping redefine R&B and soul genres in Filipino music. (Note: Attributed to multiple references:) Isah Red of the Manila Standard remarked that "her name became synonymous to R&B". Critics have regarded Kyla's Way to Your Heart as "one of the first authentic R&B albums" produced by a Filipino musician. Ricky Gallardo of The Philippine Star highlights her tone and timbre as particularly distinctive, describing her voice as "strongly remarkable" and "extraordinary", commenting that her vocal range "can easily scale notes and give melodies soulful touches". Initially, Kyla was known for her use of vocal belting, a technique popularized and highly influenced by Velasquez among young singers. Gil from The Philippine Star, however, opined that she eventually "[found] her niche not long after and has the good sense to stick to what she does best". Gallardo has compared Kyla's sound to that of American singers Aaliyah and Brandy, while the Philippine Daily Inquirer columnist Mary Ann Bautista likened her to Carey and Beyoncé. In addition to sustaining high notes, Kyla is recognized for making use of the melismatic singing technique. The media critic Boy Abunda emphasized her "clear-as-a-bell vocal tone", and praised her vocal versatility, stating, "She is among the few who possesses an impressive vocal control ... [and] can sing every note specifically for the intended musical effect". In a review of Journey, The Philippine Star stated, "Her multi-octave range has acquired warmer, fuller tones and she approaches every note with great confidence." According to writer Allan Policarpio, her live performances in Divas: Live in Manila showcased her "performing endurance and versatility". He commended Kyla's "straightforward love tunes with fluttery scales and sweet falsettos and head tones".

Kyla's work encompasses the R&B genre, but she also incorporates urban, jazz, and pop into her songs. A reviewer from the Manila Times has characterized these as "dynamically arranged songs". Her debut album, Way to Your Heart, is of the soul genre, with lyrics addressing heartbreak and relationship. David Gonzales of AllMusic described the record as "a welcome step toward modern, soulful music in the Philippines". Not Your Ordinary Girl demonstrated Kyla's "distinctly American sound", featuring songs composed by R&B musician Keith Martin. The Philippine Star singled out Kyla's "earnest rendition" of the track "Because of You". Kyla has also received co-writing credits for many of her songs. (Note: Attributed to multiple references:) In regards to the way she approaches songwriting, Kyla explained: "Writing your own music is much different from just singing songs written by someone else. The emotions and the story behind the song are easier to interpret when you experienced it first hand."

== Personal life ==
Kyla was educated at San Sebastian High School. After graduation, she attended Philippine Christian University, where she majored in mass communications. In 2005, Kyla began dating basketball player Rich Alvarez, and became engaged in February 2011. They married in a private ceremony held in Forbes Park, Makati on November 28, 2011. Their first child, a son, was born on May 6, 2013.

== Awards and accolades ==
After her breakthrough, Kyla was a recipient of Best New Artist recognitions from the Awit, Aliw, and MTV Pilipinas Music Awards. The single "Hanggang Ngayon" earned her a MTV Video Music Award. She has received a total of eleven Awit Awards, winning six for her work on Way to Your Heart. Kyla also won Best Performance by a Duet for her collaboration with Gary Valenciano on "Sana Maulit Mulit". Not Your Ordinary Girl garnered an Album of the Year nomination, while "Something About You", "Hindi Mo Ba Alam", and "Not Your Ordinary Girl" were each nominated for Best R&B Recording in 2005. Beautiful Days, Heartfelt, Heart 2 Heart, Private Affair, and Journey have all been nominated in several categories. (Note: Attributed to multiple references:) At the Star Awards for Music, Private Affair has been nominated for Album of the Year, while Journey and The Queen of R&B each received nominations for R&B Album of the Year, the former winning the award in 2015. Additionally, Kyla has received six Myx Music Awards (Note: Attributed to multiple references:) and a Box Office Entertainment Award. As of 2010, her first seven albums have each received a platinum certification from the PARI. She has received a star on the Philippines' Walk of Fame.

== Discography ==
- Way to Your Heart (2000)
- Kyla (2002)
- I Will Be There (2003)
- Not Your Ordinary Girl (2004)
- Beautiful Days (2006)
- Heartfelt (2007)
- Heart 2 Heart (2008)
- Private Affair (2010)
- The Queen of R&B (2018)
- Next Episode (2025)

== Filmography ==
=== Television ===
Kyla's television credits with year of release, title(s) and role
Year	Title	Role	Notes	Ref(s)
2002–2010	SOP	Herself	Co-host	
2003	Narito ang Puso Ko	Melani		
2003	Magpakailanman	Sarah Geronimo		
2005–2007	Pop Star Kids	Herself	Host	
2007–2009	Celebrity Duets: Philippine Edition	Herself	Duet partner	
2009	Dear Friend	Sara		
2010–2013	Party Pilipinas	Herself	Co-host	
2011	Time of My Life	Elaine		
2013–2014	Villa Quintana	Ruby Quintana		
2013–2015	Sunday All Stars	Herself	Co-host	
2015–present	ASAP	Herself	Co-host	
2016–present	Tawag ng Tanghalan	Herself	Judge	
2016–present	It's Showtime	Herself	Recurring Performer	
2026	Everybody, Sing! (season 4)	Herself	Performer	
