= MTV Pilipinas for Favorite Female Video =

Philippine music award

The following is a list of MTV Pilipinas winners for Favorite Female Video.

Year	Artist	Video	Reference
2006	Kitchie Nadal	Fire	
2005	Rachelle Ann Go	Love Of My Life	
2004	Jolina Magdangal	Bahala Na	
2003	Regine Velasquez	Sa Aking Pag-iisa (Remix)	
2002	Karylle	Can't Live Without You	
2001	Regine Velasquez	Lost Without Your Love	
2000	Viktoria	Pwede Ba?	
1999	Cris Villonco	Hindi Ko Masabi	
