= Foolish Heart (Steve Perry song) =

Single by Steve Perry

from the album Street Talk
- B-side: "It's Only Love"
- Released: November 1984
- Recorded: 1983
- Studio: Record One (Los Angeles)
- Genre: Soft rock
- Length: 3:39
- Label: Columbia
- Songwriters: Randy Goodrum; Steve Perry
- Producer: Steve Perry

Steve Perry singles chronology
"Strung Out" (1984)	"Foolish Heart" (1984)	"You Better Wait" (1994)

Music video
- "Foolish Heart" on YouTube

"Foolish Heart" is a song written by Steve Perry and Randy Goodrum. It was performed by Perry for his first solo album, Street Talk, was released as the fourth single from the album in November 1984, and peaked at number 18 on the Billboard Hot 100 and number two on the Adult Contemporary chart in February 1985.

== Music video ==
The music video for "Foolish Heart" is unusual in the fact that it is one continuous shot from beginning to end. The setting is a darkened hall with the camera overlooking a balcony rail towards the stage. On the stage, in a blue spotlight, is a boom mic and a stool. Perry walks onto the stage, sits and the song begins. Over the course of the video, the camera pans towards the stage, pauses a brief moment on Perry and then slowly returns to its original position over the balcony rail. At the end of the song, Perry walks off stage. It was directed by Jack Cole and produced by Paul Flattery, who had also done the videos "Oh Sherrie" and "Strung Out" from "Street Talk."

There is an alternate 'holiday' ending to this video which is rarely included. A second camera shot shows Perry walking off the stage towards the camera. The rest of the members of Journey (Neal Schon, Jonathan Cain, Steve Smith, Ross Valory) greet Perry as he approaches. With champagne in hand, the band wishes their fans a Happy Holiday and Happy New Year. Perry then says "Let's go cut a track" and they exit via the stage. Many believe this was a nod to the fans that Perry was returning to write and perform with Journey.

== Charts ==
Chart (1985)	Peak position
Australia (Kent Music Report)	59
Canada Top Singles (RPM)	74
Canada Adult Contemporary (RPM)	3
United States (Billboard Hot 100)	18
United States (Billboard Adult Contemporary)	2
United States (Cashbox)	23

== Other covers ==
- Former lead singer of the R&B group Atlantic Starr, Sharon Bryant, had a solo hit with the song when she covered it in 1989, reaching the top ten on the Billboard R&B chart and number 90 on the Billboard Hot 100.
- Filipino R&B band Side A covered the song in 1995 which appears on their 10th anniversary live album, Side A Live!: The 10th Anniversary Album.
- Scottish pop singer Sheena Easton covered the song on her 1997 album, Freedom.
- Filipino singer Nina covered "Foolish Heart" on her 2002 debut album Heaven.
