= MTV Pilipinas Music Award =

Philippine music award

MTV Pilipinas Music Awards
- Awarded for: Best in music
- Country: Philippines
- Presented by: MTV Pilipinas
- First award: 1999
- Final award: 2006

MTV Pilipinas Music Awards was the annual music video awards event of MTV Pilipinas.

== Award categories ==
- Video of the Year
- Favorite Male Video
- Favorite Female Video
- Favorite New Artist in a Video
- Favorite Group Video
- Favorite Indie Video
- Favorite International Video
- Best Animated Video
- Best Director

=== Defunct categories ===
- Favorite Song
- Favorite International Act^{1}

^{1} The only recipient of this category is Maroon 5 for the music video of "This Love" in 2004.

== Best Animated Video ==
The following is a list of MTV Pilipinas winners for Best Animated Video. The category is one of the seven that were added in 2006 along with Favorite Pop Video, Favorite Hip-Hop and R&B Video, Favorite Rock Video, Best Cinematography in a Video, Best Editing in a Video and Best Production Design in a Video.

Year	Artist	Video
2006	MOJOFLY	Tumatakbo

== Special awards ==
Year	Award	Recipient	Video
2006	Smart Texter's Choice Hitmaker of the Year	Cueshe	--
2006	MTV Generations Award	Francis Magalona	--
2006	MTV Inspiration Award	INXS	--
2005	MTV Generations Award	Gary Valenciano	--
2005	MTV Ayos! Award for Best Dance Sequence	Parokya ni Edgar	First Day Funk
2005	MTV Ayos! Award for Chart Attack Song of the Year	Kitchie Nadal	Huwag Na Huwag Mong Sasabihin
2005	MTV Ayos! Best Commercial Video	Bamboo	Fiestamazing
2004	Lifetime Achievement Award	The Eraserheads	--
2004	Best Use of an Open Space Award^{1}	Paolo Santos	Mapansin
2004	Best Dance Sequence Award²	Viva Hot Babes	Bulaklak
2004	Falsest Falsetto Awards³	Akafellas	Bongga Ka Day
2003	Best Dance Sequence	3yo	Iingatan Ka
2003	Closest Call (Muntik Na)	Patricia Javier	Siya Ba Ang Dahilan
2003	Highest Jump	Flora Gasser	Rivermaya's Wag Na Init Ulo Baby
2003	Best Moment	Rosanna Roces	The Dawn's Papano Naman Kami
2003	Best Cameo Appearance	Rico J. Puno	Tribe of Levi's The Way We Were
2002	Favorite Love Ballad	Kyla	--
2002	Most Stylish Music Video	Cheese	Mottaka
1999	Tower Records Icon Award	The Dawn	--

^{1} Presented by Juicy Fruit.
² Presented by Smart Buddy.
³ Presented by SMB Play.

== Host city ==
Year	Host city	Hosts	Venue
2007	--- Not held Due to MTV Philippines re-launched ---		
2006	Parañaque	K. C. Montero	PAGCOR Grand Theater
2005	Quezon City	Epi Quizon, Karylle and K. C. Montero	Araneta Coliseum (a.k.a. "The Big Dome")
2004	Pasig	Randy Santiago, Michael V., Sarah Meier and Tata Young	PhilSports Arena
2003	Taguig	Ogie Alcasid and Rufa Mae Quinto	NBC Tent
2002	Taguig	Martin Nievera	NBC Tent
2001	Metro Manila	MTV VJ's	Edsa Sharing-La Hotel
2000	Metro Manila	MTV VJ's	Philam Life Theater
1999	Makati	MTV VJ's	Glorietta Activity Center

== Records ==
The artist with the most awards of the same category is Rivermaya for Favorite Group Video in 2002 (Umaaraw, Umuulan), 2003 (Wag Na Init Ulo Baby), 2005 (You'll Be Safe Here) and 2006 (Sunday Driving). The video with the most awards in one night is Sandwich's Sugod in 2006 with four categories won: Video of the Year, Best Editing in a Video, Best Production Design in a Video and Best Director.

== See also ==
- MTV Asia Awards
