= Nina Live! =

Live album by Nina
- Released: February 23, 2005
- Recorded: January 30, 2005 at PHI Resto and Bar, Metrowalk (Pasig, Philippines)
- Genres: Pop; R&B
- Length: 83:52
- Label: Warner Music Philippines
- Producers: Ricky R. Ilacad; Neil C. Gregorio

Nina chronology
Smile (2003)	Nina Live! (2005)	Nina (2006)

Singles from Nina Live!
- 1. "I Don't Want to Be Your Friend" Released: November 2004; 2. "Love Moves in Mysterious Ways" Released: February 2005; 3. "Through the Fire" Released: May 2005; 4. "Constantly" Released: July 2005; 5. "I Love You Goodbye" Released: November 2005

Nina Live! is a live album and the third album by Filipina singer Nina, released in the Philippines on February 23, 2005, by Warner Music Philippines. It is officially the biggest-selling album by a female Filipina artist of all time, the highest-selling live album by an OPM artist, and is the fourth album to be certified Diamond by the PARI after Jose Mari Chan's Constant Change and Christmas in Our Hearts and the Eraserheads' Cutterpillow. Nina Live! remains to be the last album to reach Diamond status in the Philippines.

The original release date for the album was scheduled on February 22, 2005, but it was moved a day later due to preparation. Nina has released two successful studio albums that are both influenced by pop-R&B, but behind all the commercial activities, she regularly performs on different bars and gigs. The label wanted to show this side of the singer the best way by releasing a live album. The live album was a commercial success debuting straight to number one on the Philippine Top 10 Albums chart. The album consists of love songs from the 1970s to the 1990s, all of which she has covered live. The live session was recorded on January 30, 2005, at PHI Resto & Bar in Pasig, Metro Manila.

Nina Live! marked the last project that Nina has worked with Warner executive Ricky Ilacad, since he later moved to MCA Music. The live video recording was directed by Marla Ancheta, whom she described as a young, fun person to work with. Nina and The Essence band only had a two-week rehearsal before the video shoot, since they were already familiar with the songs. During the project, she collaborated with her Warner labelmates Christian Bautista, Thor and Trapp of Dice & K9. The songs that were chosen for the track list are the most-requested by fans and listeners. One song that was personally insisted by Nina made it to the final cut. On January 15, 2007, it was made available on digital download through iTunes and Amazon.com MP3 Download.

Upon release, the album received generally favorable reviews. While praising the vocal ability and range of Nina, most critics did not like the idea of doing covers, believing that she has enough talent to release originals. Surprisingly, the album was a huge commercial success. After a week of commercial release, the album immediately reached gold status by the Philippine Association of the Record Industry (PARI), and certified platinum after three weeks. It is considered to be the biggest-selling album by a female artist in the Philippines, certifying 10× Platinum (Diamond) by the PARI, a rare feat during the turn of the new millennium, where fewer people are purchasing compact discs and cassette tapes. It is the fourth biggest-selling album of an OPM artist, only behind Eraserheads' Cutterpillow (10× Platinum) and Jose Mari Chan's Christmas in Our Hearts and Constant Change (both 20× Platinum).

Five successful commercial singles were released from the album. "I Don't Want to Be Your Friend" was released prior to the album, as part of Diane Warren's love songs compilation. The first single from the live recording is "Love Moves in Mysterious Ways", originally recorded by Julia Fordham. The song remains as one of the most successful singles of the 2000s, staying at number one for twelve consecutive weeks. It has, since, been linked to Nina, even though it was only a cover. "Through the Fire" was later released. The song is popular for her vocal belts, reaching G♯5 in full chest voice. "Constantly" is the fourth single and it also performed well on charts. "I Love You Goodbye" was released as the final single from the album. Warner made an official music video for the song, instead of distributing the live performance on TV stations.

== Background and development ==
Nina's first two studio releases are heavily influenced by the pop-R&B sound reminiscent to international music at that time. Both albums contain a few cover versions, some of which were released as official singles and became commercially successful in the Philippines. Heaven contains two revivals, namely "Foolish Heart" (originally by Steve Perry) and "Loving You" (originally by Ric Segreto)—both were released as single and became chart-toppers. "Foolish Heart" was initially recorded as a demo, but was later included in the album due to its evident potential. The song was a hit, becoming her second number one single, and one of the most played songs of 2003 in the country. "A Girl Can Dream" is also a cover, which appeared on her second album, Smile. It was also released as a single, and became a hit.

"The Nina Live! album started when Warner Music saw me performing on different bars, lounges... This is the best that I do, and I love doing it for my fans..."

— Nina, on how the idea and concept of the album started out.

"I Don't Want to Be Your Friend" is another cover that Nina made a hit with. The song ruled Philippine charts for weeks, and has been linked to her, even though it was originally recorded by Cyndi Lauper. It was clearly obvious that fans and listeners loved it when she does covers. Behind all the commercial activities, Nina regularly performs in gigs at different bars such as Hard Rock Cafe, Bagaberde and 19 East. She sings her own versions of classic love songs from the '70s to the '90s. For that reason, Warner Music Philippines came up with the idea of putting her live performances in a CD. According to Nina, Warner told her "Why not put it in CD form or in a DVD, so that the people could take home [her] show." After countless live concert performances, she finally gave in to requests by her longtime fans to put out her first live album. The album was said to showcase her musical taste and versatility through a collection of the most requested love songs.

== Recording and composition ==
The album was recorded live on January 30, 2005, at PHI Resto and Bar in Metrowalk, Pasig. Nina's labelmates Christian Bautista, Thor and Trapp of Dice & K9 collaborated with her on the album. The live video recording was directed by Marla Ancheta. Warner invited several guests to act as audience on the concert, and the label's managing executive at that time, Ricky Ilacad, oriented them on what the film should look like. According to Nina, she did not really have a tough time preparing for the songs, since she sings them on her gigs. The only thing they needed to do was polish things up, and it took [like] two weeks. Nina expressed how happy she was with The Essence band in the following statement:

"Yung bandang tumugtog sa'kin on that night, sobra akong natutuwa sa kanila kasi they really prepared for the recording. Two weeks before, nag-pratice sila halos everyday for it, and it turned out well kasi ang ganda nung pagkakarecord... almost perfect. [The band [The Essence] that played for me on that night, I'm very happy with them, because they really prepared for the recording. Two weeks before, they practiced almost everyday for it, and it turned out well because it sounds beautifully recorded... almost perfect]."

"Bumigay ako after nung take kasi ang aga ng call time, tapos late na natapos [My body gave in after the shoot because the call time was early, and it ended late]."

— Nina, on how she felt after finishing the video recording.

In the process of song selection, the production team chose songs that Nina sings in her gigs, the most-requested by fans—including "Through the Fire", "(Love Moves in) Mysterious Ways" and "At Your Best (You Are Love)". Nina personally insisted "Anything for You" to be included on the track list. During the recording, she admitted that the most difficult song to sing was "Through the Fire", knowing that it requires high vocal registers. She called the video shoot "fun," considering that the director, Ancheta, is kind and still young. They just jammed to it. Nina Live! was not really recorded in a live concert format. It included retakes of a few scenes, where the singers made unintentional mistakes.

Nina Live! captures the Soul Siren magic, the young diva in her element, effortlessly dishing out torch favorites music-loving golden oldies will never forget, like Chaka Khan's "Through the Fire", Brenda Russell's "Piano in the Dark" and The Eagles' "I Can't Tell You Why". Contemporary tracks like Aaliyah's "At Your Best (You Are Love)", Jennifer Love Hewitt's "Cool With You", Julia Fordham's "(Love Moves in) Mysterious Ways" and Celine Dion's "I Love You, Goodbye" were chosen to fit the young and student fan base of Nina. Nina collaborated with three of her in-demand Warner labelmates. The first one to sing with her was Bautista on "Burn". She admitted that they both did not have a rehearsal, so they just did retakes to perfect the duet. R&B balladeer Thor followed, and he performed "The Closer I Get to You" with Nina. The two were described to have matched vocally, note for note. She also got to bust some hip-hop grooves, when she did an upbeat urban-styled version of "Coloured Kisses" together with Dice & K9's mad pup, Trapp. The duo took the song into a whole new different sound and arrangement. As an added bonus, the album also features Nina's biggest single of 2004—"I Don't Want to Be Your Friend" which was recorded in the studio and not part of the live concert. The track was specially written by international songwriter Diane Warren. The album is notable for having a running time of more than 80 minutes on a single standard compact disc, and for being one of the first OPM albums to be presented in a digipak.

== Critical reception ==
Professional ratings
Review scores
Source	Rating
ShowbizPinoy.com	(favorable)
Titik Pilipino	3.5/5 stars

Aside from impressive huge sales and three number one singles in it, Nina Live! was also well received by music critics, earning favorable reviews. Ginnie Faustino-Galgana of Titik Pilipino gave the album three and a half out of five stars, praising the Soul Siren's vocal ability and skills, and stated that "[Nina]'s vocal range is decidedly wide. Her voice itself has proven itself youthful and adaptable to any beat [...] By virtue of the familiarity with the covered songs, as well as Nina's talent, it is no wonder that this album has been churning one hit after another [...] Overall, this album only proves that Nina can do wonderfully with covers." However, she thought that Nina can do better with originals, saying "I believe Nina has enough talent to establish herself with her own sound. If she can be in a tandem with a composer who can write songs for her, I'm sure Nina will do it justice and churn out hits." She ended her statement by saying that the live experience from the album is "quite memorable."

At the height of the album's success, it has been a huge influence and reference to a series of live albums that were later released by different artists. Such albums that followed Nina Live! were Freestyle's Live @ 19 East (2006), Sitti's Sitti Live! (2006), Christian Bautista's Just a Love Song... Christian Bautista Live! (2007), Rachelle Ann Go's Rachelle Ann Rocks Live! (2008) and Aiza Seguerra's Live! (2009).

== Commercial performance ==
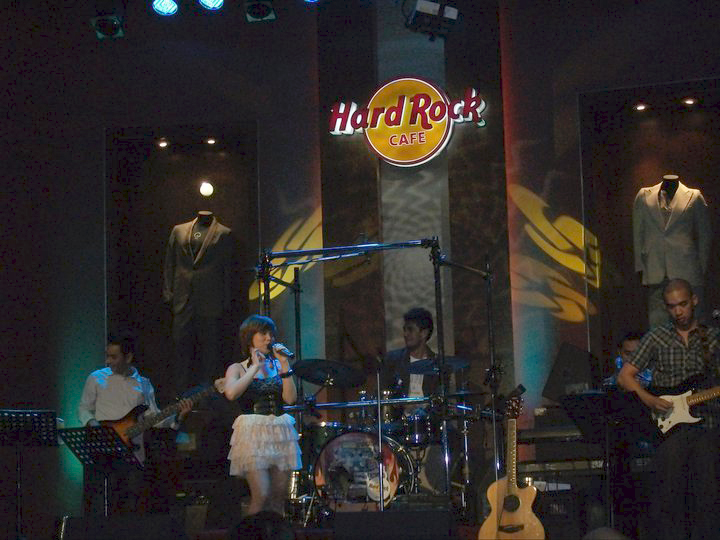
Nina performing "Fall for You" at Hard Rock Cafe in 2011.

In the Philippines, Nina Live! did not debut on the chart on its first week of release, As of (March 15, 2009) the album debuted straight to number one on the Philippine Top Albums chart, replacing Christian Bautista's Christian Bautistas album for being number one on the chart. It sold 15,000 copies on that week making it certified PARI Gold. On its third week the album was remained strong at number one on the chart and it sold 30,000 copies on that week making it certified PARI Platinum. The album remained number one position on the chart for eight consecutive weeks. The album left the chart at number nineteen position, it spent a total of forty-five weeks on the chart. The album was certified PARI Double Platinum in less than two months with sales of 60,000 copies. Before the second commercial single "Through the Fire" was released, the album was already certified 3× Platinum after selling more than 90,000 units in the country. By the end of 2005, Nina Live! was still on the top ten on the chart at number nine, then it was certified 6× Platinum by the PARI denoting over 180,000 copies sold domestically. It was labelled as one of the fastest-selling Filipino albums in history. In August 2006, the album was on number twelve position on the Philippine Top Albums chart and it already sold 210,000 copies being certified PARI 7× Platinum. In November 2007, it sold a total of 240,000 units and was awarded 8× Platinum certification by the PARI during the ASAP '08 episode which aired on March 9, 2008. Early in 2009, it was reported to have sold more than 260,300 copies in the country. Four years after Nina Live!'s release, the album managed to sell additional 40,000 units, which equaled to double platinum (using PARI's April 2009 criterion for record certifications). The 8× Platinum it has received in 2008 and the 2× Platinum it received with PARI's new guidelines were, then, combined. On October 11, 2009, Nina Live! was awarded a Diamond (10× Platinum) certification on ASAP '09 for selling more than 280,000 units in the Philippines. To date, the album has sold more than 300,000 units in the Philippines based from pure physical sales alone, excluding digital purchase, streaming, airplay and VCD/DVD sales.

On June 12, 2017, Billboard Philippines was launched. "I Love You Goodbye" debuted at number 8 on the Catalog Chart, a chart for local songs that were released for over three years in the Philippines but still generate sales and streaming activity data. It stayed in the position for three consecutive weeks before it eventually peaked at number 3 on the week of August 7, 2017.

=== Nina Live! as the sole recipient of the Diamond award certification ===
As soon as Nina received the first ever Diamond award for an OPM female artist by the Philippine Association of the Record Industry (PARI) in October 2009, false reports on the album's sales surfaced the news. The album was reported to have sold only 220,000 units, when according to PARI, it has already moved over 240,000 units in November 2007. This was given proof by the 8× Platinum award the album received at that time. News articles stated that PARI lowered their guidelines to 20,000 units per platinum due to piracy and illegal downloads. After hearing the statement, Sarah Geronimo's fans protested Nina getting the award ahead of Geronimo, since Popstar: A Dream Come True has allegedly sold over 210,000 copies in the country, according to Viva Records. Fans of other artists including Regine Velasquez and Aiza Seguerra claimed to have reached the certification status. Nina said that there was no feud between her and Geronimo. She expressed herself in the following statement:

"Actually, I don't really know issues about that [the Diamond award], but since they asked, I can't say anything. For me, if they really reached Diamond status, they should be awarded, like me, I was awarded when I reached Diamond. There's no problem, if Diamond, it's Diamond [...] I'm not offended, like what I said if she's really a Diamond awardee, why would I be mad? [...] It's a very good feeling, for every artist, for every singer, that's a fulfillment even if it's not Diamond, even if it's Gold, Platinum, it's a fulfillment for a singer."

Despite claims made by other fans campaigning for their favorite female artists to be acknowledged with such recognition, Nina Live! is still the only album by a female artist that is certified Diamond in the Philippines. Fans of Geronimo, Velasquez among others have cited Wikipedia to stake claims of such certifications, but Nina Live! remains the only female album certified Diamond in the Philippines.

== Singles ==
Prior to the release of the album, "I Don't Want to Be Your Friend" was released in fourth quarter of 2004, originally, as single for Diane Warren Presents Love Songs. The song was originally recorded by Cyndi Lauper, and Nina's version charted at number one in the Philippines for eight weeks. Since then, it was considered as a Nina Live! hit single. The music video gave way on her transformation from a pop cutie to a sexy siren. The first official single, "Love Moves in Mysterious Ways", was solicited to radio in February 2005 and became a monster hit by the summer of that year. Though the song was originally released by Julia Fordham, Nina was linked to it as many thought she was its original singer. It was the biggest OPM single of 2000's era, topping Philippine music charts for twelve consecutive weeks. It was also the most-played and most-requested song on Philippine radio stations of 2005. The song is a big factor on the album's overflowing success. When Fordham was asked if she ever heard of Nina's rendition, she replied "I know Nina did a beautiful job [with the song]. She's really quite good."

The second single "Through the Fire", a Chaka Khan original, was released in May 2005 and became her other monster hit. Nina's version is popular for her vocal belting from the song's bridge, all the way to its end. The last belt of the song, a sustained G♯5, is considered to be Nina's highest recorded register in chest voice. "Constantly" was the third single, released in the second half of 2005. The song showed her smooth mellow sound. Although it did not rule the charts, it is included in Nina's string of hits. The last commercial single was a Celine Dion hit, "I Love You Goodbye", released in the last quarter of 2005. The song was very dramatic, it captured the brokenhearted side of the singer. The music video of the single that was distributed to music channels is not live. Warner made an official version, instead of using the live performance. The song features only Nina (on vocals) and Chris Buenviaje on acoustic guitar.

In January 2006, "Burn", a duet with romantic balladeer Christian Bautista, was released as a radio-only single. Without any official release, the song entered the Philippine music charts.

== Promotion ==
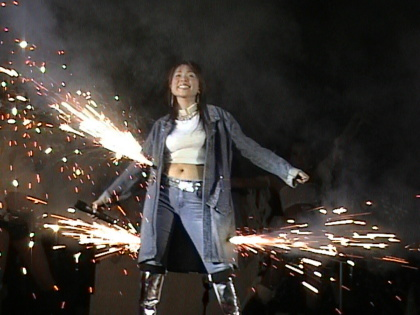
Nina performing on the Nina Live! concert in San Pablo, Philippines in October 2005.

Nina Live! became the most successful album, not only by Nina, but by an OPM artist in the 2000s. The album was launched on March 27, 2005, at The Podium in Ortigas Center, Pasig, Philippines. The lead single, "Love Moves in Mysterious Ways", immediately began receiving heavy airplay. In May 2005, the album was already certified 3× Platinum by the Philippine Association of the Record Industry (PARI). On May 27 and 28 of the same year, she performed live in a two-night concert at the Music Museum, entitled Nina Just Wanna Have Fun. It was her first ever major concert that featured dance numbers and extraordinary costumes. On October 1, 2005, she had her biggest solo concert to date, entitled Nina Live!, at the Araneta Coliseum—where she sang Nina Live! hits such as "Love Moves in Mysterious Ways", "Through the Fire" and even a medley of Diane Warren songs. On October 15, she did another Nina Live! concert, and it was held at San Pablo.

Aside from performing the album's tracks on her major concerts, gigs and TV guestings, she has performed them many times on the Phillipian variety show ASAP.

=== Video release ===
Before 2005 ended, Warner Music Philippines released a DVD for Nina Live!. It was the first ever complete live DVD that was released in the Philippines. It contains the whole live session and several bonus features—including Nina's biography, discography, photo gallery, an interview with her, videoke mode, behind the scenes of the album's recording sessions and the official music video for "I Don't Want to Be Your Friend".

== Awards and accolades ==
Aside from favorable response from critics, Nina Live! earned numerous nominations in major awarding events. In 2005, "I Don't Want to Be Your Friend" was nominated for Favorite Female Video on the MTV Pilipinas Music Awards, but lost to Rachelle Ann Go's cover of "Love of My Life". Nina was nominated for Female R&B Artist of the Year on the first ever Philippine Hip-Hop Music Awards, but lost to Kyla. Before the year ended, she was given the Best Female Acoustic Artist award by the National Consumers Quality Awards. Nina Live! earned four nominations on the 2006 Awit Awards, two of which were under the same category—Best Performance by a Duet for "The Closer I Get to You" featuring Thor and "Burn" featuring Christian Bautista. Nina won two awards, including Best Selling Album of the Year for Nina Live! and Best Performance by a Duet for "The Closer I Get to You", but lost the Best Performance by a Female Recording Artist award to Barbie Almalbis. On the MYX Music Awards 2006, she received another four nominations—her most number of nominations on the award so far, where she won Favorite Collaboration for "Burn" with Bautista. However, she lost the Favorite Remake award to Mark Bautista's "I Need You", the Favorite Female Artist award to Go, and the Favorite Artist award to Cueshe. On the 2006 Aliw Awards, she was nominated for two categories—Best Female Major Concert and Best Female Performance in a Concert for Nina Live! The Concert—which she both lost. In the same year, she earned her second OPM Female Artist of the Year award by the RX 93.1.

Nina Live! is the only album that received the most recognitions (6 awards) on the ASAP Platinum Circle. It had additional single platinum in every year from 2005 to 2008. In 2009, Nina received the Elite Platinum Circle Award for being the first female OPM artist to achieve a Diamond (10× Platinum) certification by the Philippine Association of the Record Industry (PARI).

List of awards and nominations

Year	Award	Category	Result
2005	MTV Pilipinas Music Awards	Favorite Female Video ("I Don't Want to Be Your Friend")	Nominated
2005	National Consumers Quality Awards	Best Female Acoustic Artist	Won
2005	Philippine Hip-Hop Music Awards	Female R&B Artist of the Year	Nominated
2006	Aliw Awards	Best Female Major Concert (Nina Live! The Concert)	Nominated
2006	Aliw Awards	Best Female Performance in a Concert	Nominated
2006	Awit Awards	Best Performance by a Female Recording Artist	Nominated
2006	Awit Awards	Best Performance by a Duet ("The Closer I Get to You")	Won
2006	Awit Awards	Best Performance by a Duet ("Burn")	Nominated
2006	Awit Awards	Best Selling Album of the Year (Nina Live!)	Won
2006	MYX Music Awards	Favorite Artist	Nominated
2006	MYX Music Awards	Favorite Female Artist	Nominated
2006	MYX Music Awards	Favorite Collaboration ("Burn")	Won
2006	MYX Music Awards	Favorite Remake ("Love Moves in Mysterious Ways")	Nominated
2006	RX 93.1	OPM Female Artist of the Year	Won

== Track listing ==
All tracks were produced by Neil Gregorio.

No.	Title	Writer(s)	Original artist(s)	Length
1.	"Sweet Thing"	Chaka Khan, Tony Maiden	Rufus and Khan	3:52
2.	"Love Moves in Mysterious Ways"	Tom Snow, Dean Pitchford	Julia Fordham	4:27
3.	"Stay (With Me)"	Ron Boustead, Karukas Aloha	Pauline Wilson	3:49
4.	"Burn" (featuring Christian Bautista)	Tina Arena, Pam Reswik, Steve Werfel	Arena	5:19
5.	"Through the Fire"	Cynthia Weil, David Foster, Tom Keane	Khan	5:01
6.	"Fall for You"	Kenneth "Babyface" Edmonds	Shanice	5:29
7.	"Coloured Kisses" (featuring Trapp of Dice & K9)	Les Pierced, Frankie Blue Sposato, Marta "Martika" Marrero	Martika	4:19
8.	"Cool with You"	Joleen Belle, Robert Palmer	Jennifer Love Hewitt	3:32
9.	"Constantly"	Donald Robinson	Lia	4:27
10.	"At Your Best"	Rudolph Isley, Chris Jasper, Ernie Isley, O'Kelly Isley Jr., Ronald Isley, Marvin Isley	Aaliyah	4:57
11.	"Sunlight"	Bill Cantos, Ricky Lawson	Kevyn Lettau	4:02
12.	"The Closer I Get to You" (featuring Thor)	Roberta Flack	Flack	4:43
13.	"Steep"	Lauren Christy	Christy	4:30
14.	"I Love You Goodbye"	Diane Warren	Celine Dion	4:06
15.	"I Can't Tell You Why"	Timothy B. Schmit, Don Henley, Glenn Frey	Eagles	3:34
16.	"Piano in the Dark"	Brenda Russell, Jeff Hull, Scott Cutler	Russell	4:26
17.	"Anything for You"	Gloria Estefan	Estefan	3:57
18.	"Time to Say Goodbye"	Angela Bofill	Bofill	5:15
19.	"I Don't Want to Be Your Friend" (bonus track)	Warren	Cyndi Lauper	3:56

== Album credits ==
Credits were taken from Titik Pilipino.

Production

- Marla Ancheta – director
- Rey Cortez – album cover layout
- Chris Genuino – album cover layout
- Neil C. Gregorio – A&R, album producer, mastering and sequencing
- Ricky R. Ilacad – A&R, executive producer
- Mark Laccay – live recording
- Anne Poblador – styling
- Daniel Tan – photography
- Juancho Herrera – mixing
- Frey Zambrano – production coordinator
- Ramil Aznar - Editor

Personnel

- Dexter Ayala – bass guitar, back-up vocals
- Christian Bautista – lead vocals
- Chris Buenviaje – acoustic guitar, electric guitar, back-up vocals
- Leo Espocia – drums, back-up vocals
- Nina Girado – lead vocals
- Rico Sobrevinas – saxophone, back-up vocals
- Thor – lead vocals
- Trapp (of Dice & K9) – lead vocals
- Derek Tupas – keyboards, back-up vocals

Recording locations

- PHI Resto & Bar (Metrowalk, Pasig, Philippines) – live recording
- Warner Chili Red Studio – mastering and sequencing

== Charts and certifications ==
Chart (2005–2008)	Peak position
Philippine Top Albums	1

Country	Provider	Certification	Sales
Philippines	PARI	10× Platinum (Diamond)	330,000+

== Release history ==
Country	Edition	Release date	Label	Catalogue
Philippines	Standard (CD + bonus track)	February 23, 2005	Warner Music	504677855-2
South Korea	Standard (CD + bonus track)	January 15, 2007	Warner Music	643443640268
United States	Standard (digital download + bonus track)	January 15, 2007	WEA	

== See also ==
- List of best-selling albums in the Philippines
