= Nina Videoke =

Video by Nina
- Released: May 2005
- Recorded: 2002–2005
- Genre: Pop; R&B; Live
- Length: 40 minutes
- Language: English, Tagalog
- Label: Warner Music Philippines
- Producer: Ricky Ilacad; Neil Gregorio

Nina chronology
Nina Videoke (2005)	Nina Live! (2005)

Nina Videoke is the first ever video release by Filipina singer Nina. It is a collection of her music videos and includes one live performance, "Love Moves in Mysterious Ways", which was recorded from her live album, Nina Live!. Warner Music Philippines decided to release a video album of Nina due to the overflowing success of her live album, which has earned a Diamond certification by the Philippine Association of the Record Industry (PARI). Nina Videoke was released in May 2005, and was immediately followed by the first ever complete live DVD in Philippine music history, Nina Live!.

== Content ==
The video contains music videos of her number one singles "Jealous", "Foolish Heart", "Make You Mine", "I Don't Want To Be Your Friend" and the longest number one OPM single in 2000's era, "Love Moves in Mysterious Ways". It also includes her music videos, which were shot with the use of special visual effects, such as "Heaven", "Loving You", "Sayang Naman" and "The Christmas Song". One video, "A Girl Can Dream", features her labelmate Christian Bautista who portrays her love interest.

== Track listing ==
1. "Love Moves in Mysterious Ways"
2. "I Don't Want to Be Your Friend"
3. "Jealous"
4. "Foolish Heart"
5. "Loving You"
6. "Heaven"
7. "Make You Mine"
8. "A Girl Can Dream"
9. "Sayang Naman"
10. "The Christmas Song"

== Personnel ==
Credits were taken from Nina Videoke liner notes.

- Neil Gregorio – album producer
- Ricky Ilacad – executive producer
