= Nina Sings the Hits of Diane Warren =

Studio album by Nina
- Released: July 25, 2008 (Philippines)
- Recorded: 2007–2008
- Genres: Pop; R&B
- Length: 65:24
- Label: Warner Music Philippines
- Producers: Jim Baluyut (exec.); Neil C. Gregorio

Nina chronology
Nina in the Mix: The Dense Modesto Remixes (2007)	Nina Sings the Hits of Diane Warren (2008)	Best of Nina (2009)

Singles from Nina Sings the Hits of Diane Warren
- 1. "I Don't Want to Miss a Thing" Released: August 2008; 2. "There You'll Be" Released: November 2008

Nina Sings the Hits of Diane Warren is the fourth studio album by Filipina singer Nina, released in the Philippines on July 25, 2008, by Warner Music Philippines. It is a cover album consisting of Nina's renditions of familiar love songs written by American songwriter Diane Warren. The idea behind the release of the album started after the success of her single "I Don't Want to Be Your Friend" in 2004, which was initially recorded for Warren's love songs compilation.

Upon release, the album received negative response from critics, most reviewers pointing out the "vocal acrobatics" and redundancy of cover albums. Despite criticisms, the album proved to be a commercial hit, certifying Gold by the Philippine Association of the Record Industry (PARI) on September 1, 2008. It was considered a "late awarding," since the album sold enough for a gold certification in its first week of commercial release. To date, it has sold over 30,000 units in the country and has been certified Platinum by the PARI. The album has been released internationally, mostly in South-East Asian countries. However, Warner failed to promote it in those territories due to prioritization of promoting Charice's self-titled 2010 album.

Two singles were commercially released off the album. "I Don't Want to Miss a Thing", an Aerosmith original, was the first single. It featured a mellow arrangement and soft vocal delivery, entirely opposite to the original arrangement. The song became a chart-topping hit and is considered to be one of Nina's trademark singles. "There You'll Be" was released as a follow-up single. Nina personally chose the song, and considers it as a "Thank You" to her fans who were always there to support her. "Saving Forever for You" was released to radio in 2009 as a promo single to boost up album sales.

== Background and development ==
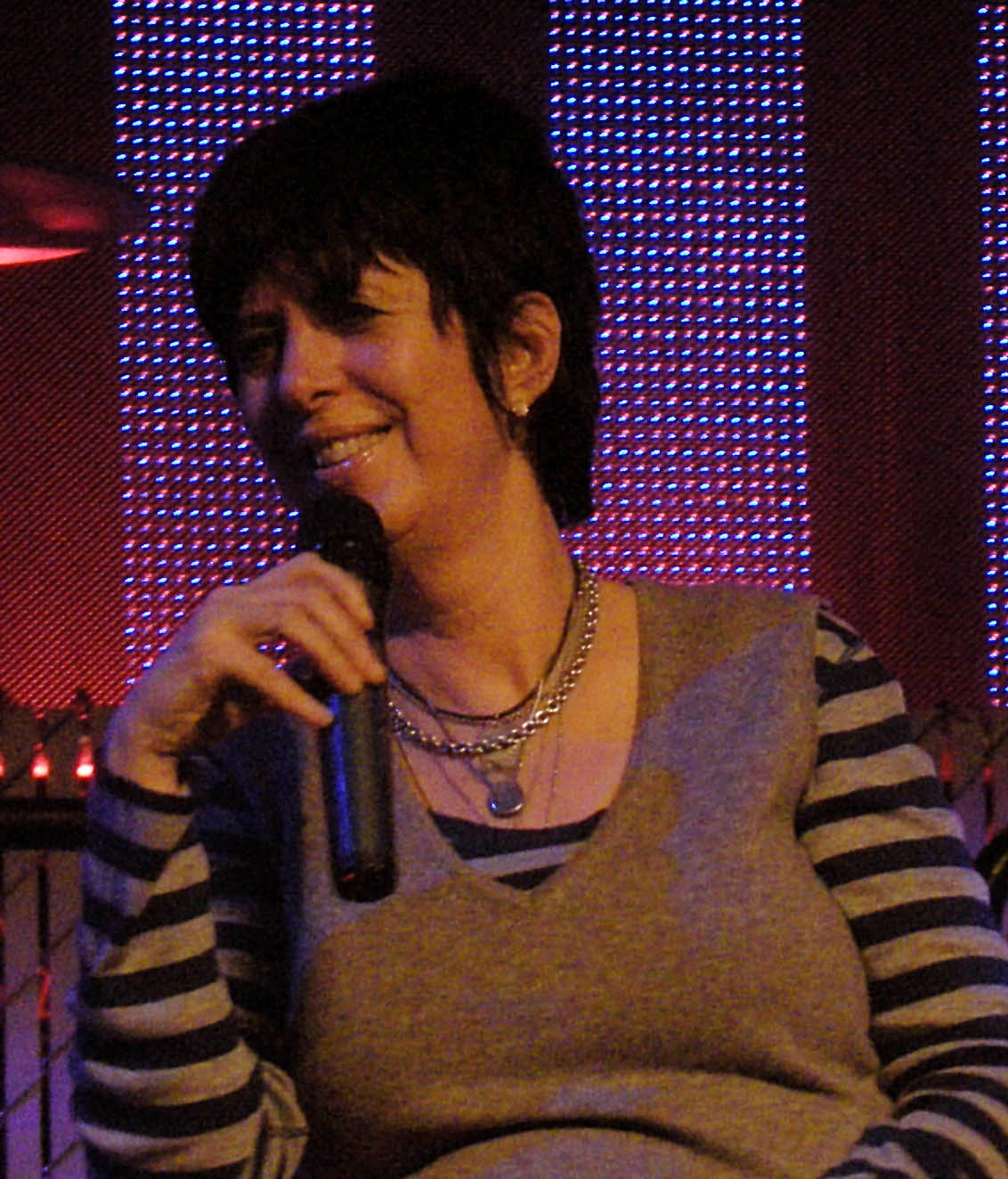
The album contains the most popular hits by Diane Warren.

In 2004, Warner Music Philippines came out with a compilation of Diane Warren's all-time hits, on which Nina contributed a song—"I Don't Want to Be Your Friend". She was also the only Asian singer that was featured on the album. In a press conference on July 29, 2008, at Red Box, TriNoma in Quezon City, Nina revealed that she is a fan of Warren, and that she wanted to do a record consisting of her hits. Hearing about the interview, Warren willingly agreed and allowed her request. A message by Warren, stating "A few years ago Nina cut "I Don't Want to Be Your Friend", one of my favorite songs. I am very happy that she is now coming out with an entire album filled with the songs that I'm proud of. Hopefully, this is just the beginning of a lot of hits together," can be found on the album's sleeve.

In selecting the songs, Warner and Nina wanted to include hits that are familiar to the Filipino listeners, and some of her favorites as well. They thought that people can relate more to the song, if they are familiar with it. For the arrangement, she and her team did only slight changes to not ruin the original mood envisioned by Warren. Bobby Velasco, Alvin Nunez, producer Ferdie Marquez, Mike Luis of Freestyle, Jay Durias of South Border, and Nina's band were assigned to re-arrange the songs.

== Critical reception ==
Professional ratings
Review scores
Source	Rating
Titik Pilipino	3/5 stars

Despite certifying Gold just a week after its official release, Nina Sings the Hits of Diane Warren received very few nominations on awarding events and negative response from OPM critics. Resty Odon of Titik Pilipino gave the album three out of five stars, saying "To be honest, what I've been expecting at this point in Nina's career is an album of original compositions suited to her voice. I don't like her being relegated to cover-girl status because I think her big little voice deserves originals." He further stated "there's the risk of Nina having to suffer the inevitable: ruthless comparison with the original interpreters—something I'd rather skip here and leave to more vicious reviewers." However, he praised "I Don't Want to Be Your Friend", saying "It's one song where she didn't have to shout and be a vocal Chinese acrobat."

=== Reaction to her covers ===
Despite the success of her original singles, "Jealous" (2003) and "Someday" (2006), Nina's highest-selling album Nina Live! consists entirely of revivals of classic love songs. "Love Moves in Mysterious Ways", the album's first single, became very popular in the Philippines that even though the song was just a cover, it was considered as a Nina hit. Her renditions of "Foolish Heart", "Through the Fire" and "Somewhere Down the Road" also managed to reach the top of music charts in the country. Aside from Nina Live!, she released a cover album in 2007, paying tribute to American singer-songwriter Barry Manilow. It was entitled Nina Featuring the Hits of Barry Manilow. OPM critics reacted negatively to this kind of musical process that she was doing. On an interview with the entertainment press at Red Box, Nina defended herself in the following statement:

It's fulfilling to sing any song, maybe a cover or an original song, just the fact that I'm singing is fulfilling enough.

She further expressed about not worrying on being a typecast as a singer known for reusing previous hits, saying that the reason on why she keeps on releasing covers is because of her fans. They were the ones who requested it.

Nominations

- ASAP Pop Viewer's Choice Award for Pop Song ("I Don't Want to Miss a Thing") - lost to "Very Special Love" by Sarah Geronimo
- Awit Award for Best Performance by a Female Recording Artist - lost to Aiza Seguerra
- Awit Award for Best Selling Album of the Year (Nina Sings the Hits of Diane Warren) - lost to Charice by Charice
- Awit Award for People's Choice Best Performance by a Female Recording Artist - lost to Regine Velasquez
- PMPC Star Award for Music for Female Pop Artist of the Year - lost to Sarah Geronimo
- PMPC Star Award for Music for Revival Album of the Year (Nina Sings the Hits of Diane Warren) - lost to Low Key by Regine Velasquez and Falling in Love by Rachelle Ann Go

== Commercial performance ==
Nina Sings the Hits of Diane Warren debuted at number twenty on the Philippines Top 20 Albums chart, then after a week it climbed at number one on the chart replacing Martin Nievera's Ikaw Ang Pangarap album, it was the highest selling album on that week, it spent three weeks at number one on the chart making it Nina's commercial success album. The album spent a total of fifteen weeks on the chart. In September 2008, the album had sold 15,000 copies in the Philippines being certified Gold in PARI. It had been certified PARI Platinum for reaching 30,000 copies.

== Singles ==
"I Don't Want to Miss a Thing"
A sample from "I Don't Want to Miss a Thing". The song consists of an entirely different arrangement from the original version.

"I Don't Want to Miss a Thing" was released as lead single, alongside Nina Sings the Hits of Diane Warren in August 2008. Nina's rendition of the song was initially compared to Regine Velasquez's R2K (2000) version, which consisted mostly of high notes and vocal belting. Due to its completely different arrangement, Nina's whispery, toned-down mellow version eventually made its own impact to Filipino listeners. The music video premiered on myx in September 2008. "There You'll Be," a Faith Hill original, was chosen personally by Nina as the second single from the album in November 2008. She considered the song as a "thank you" to her fans, and picked it as single due to its message that fits exactly with her gratitude for the support of her fans. Early in 2009, behind-the-scenes footage from the song's music video was posted on Nina's official website. In February 2009, the official music video was released.

If you are in a situation where you're happy, of course you could not ask for more. And if there's a person who could make you smile, just feel blessed that this person could turn around a sad moment into happy moment.

— Nina, on "I Could Not Ask for More", which was supposed to be the first single of the album.

Other notable songs

Prior to the album's release, "I Could Not Ask for More" was rumored to be the first single. The song was said to have interpreted Nina's professional and romantic state at the time. However, the release was canceled for unknown reasons, and "I Don't Want to Miss a Thing" served as first single instead. In early 2009, "Saving Forever for You", a song originally recorded by Shanice, started receiving heavy airplay on TV and radio. It was used in ABS-CBN commercials and in an episode of Your Song entitled "Feb-ibig," starring Christian Bautista and Karylle, which aired on February 15, 2009.

In September 2010, an official music video for "Love Will Lead You Back" was solicited to Philippine music video channels. The video features footage and clips from various music videos recorded by Nina from 2002 to 2009. It was later revealed as her "farewell" single with Warner Music, also serving as the first and only single from her 2010 greatest hits album Diamond: Greatest Hits 2002-2010.

== Promotion ==
Nina Sings the Hits of Diane Warren was officially launched on July 29, 2008, at Red Box Karaoke, TriNoma, Quezon City. On August 10, 2008, Nina had another album launch on ASAP '08, where she sang the album's carrier single, "I Don't Want to Miss a Thing". During the next episode of the show, her album received a Gold Record award for selling over 15,000 copies in the Philippines for only a week. On August 18, 2008, Nina guested on a Boy & Kris episode, "Birit by Request", with Christian Bautista and Lani Misalucha. She performed the first single "I Don't Want to Miss a Thing". On August 31, 2008, Nina performed the song again on ASAP '08 together with Pinoy Dream Academy scholar Liezel Garcia. She performed on MYX Live!, hosted by Jett Pangan, singing eight songs from the album, including the two singles. The episode aired on April 22, 2009.

It is considered to be her second album to reach Gold certification in just one week, following her 10× Platinum third effort, Nina Live!.

== Track listing ==
All tracks are written by Diane Warren, and produced by Neil Gregorio.

Disc 1: Nina Sings the Hits of Diane Warren
No.	Title	Original artist(s)	Length
1.	"I Don't Want to Miss a Thing" (arranged by Bobby Velasco)	Aerosmith / Mark Chesnutt	4:09
2.	"I Turn to You" (arranged by Ferdie Marquez)	All-4-One / Christina Aguilera	4:24
3.	"Love Will Lead You Back" (arranged by Velasco)	Taylor Dayne	4:40
4.	"Because You Loved Me" (arranged by Marquez)	Celine Dion	4:38
5.	"Have You Ever?" (arranged by Marquez)	Brandy	4:28
6.	"Un-Break My Heart" (arranged by Velasco)	Toni Braxton	5:03
7.	"There You'll Be" (arranged by Velasco)	Faith Hill	3:28
8.	"I'll Never Get Over You (Getting Over Me)" (arranged by Nina's Band)	Exposé	4:08
9.	"Blue Eyes Blue" (arranged by Velasco)	Eric Clapton	4:30
10.	"How Can We Be Lovers?" (arranged by Alvin Nunez)	Michael Bolton	4:33
11.	"When I See You Smile" (arranged by Mike Luis)	Bad English	4:36
12.	"Saving Forever for You" (arranged by Jay Durias)	Shanice	4:28
13.	"How Do I Live" (arranged by Luis)	LeAnn Rimes / Trisha Yearwood	4:12
14.	"I Could Not Ask for More" (arranged by Nina's Band)	Edwin McCain / Sara Evans	4:00
15.	"I Don't Want to Be Your Friend" (arranged by Nunez)	Cyndi Lauper	3:58

Disc 2: Nina Sings the Hits of Diane Warren (Minus One)

== Personnel ==
Credits were taken from Titik Pilipino.

- Pam Arrieta (with Blue String Section) – violin, cello
- Jim Baluyut – executive producer
- Joseph De Vera – cover layout
- Janette Dela Fuente – stylist
- Nina Girado – lead vocals, back-up vocals
- Neil Gregorio – A&R administration, producer, additional string section arrangement, vocal supervision, mastering and sequencing
- Arnie Mendaros – vocal supervision
- Noel Mendez – acoustic guitar, electric guitar
- Dr. Marlon Pecjo – photography
- Aldwin Perez – violin, cello, live strings section arrangement
- Anne Poblador – album concept
- Angee Rozul – vocals, guitars and string sections recording
- Salie (of MAC) – make-up
- Dante Tanedo – mixing
- Bobby Velasco – drums

=== Recording locations ===
- Tracks Recording Studio – vocals, guitars and string section
- Pinknoise Studio (Quezon City, Philippines) – additional grand piano, vocals, guitar
- Soundstrite Studio (Makati, Philippines) – additional grand piano, vocals, guitar
- D Masters Touch Studio (Guam, USA) – mixing
- Chili Red Studio – mastering and sequencing

== Charts ==
Chart (2008–2009)	Peak position
Philippines Top 20 Albums	1

== Certifications ==
Country	Provider	Certification	Sales
Philippines	PARI	Platinum	30,000+
