= Nina Live! (video) =

Video by Nina
- Released: May 28, 2005
- Recorded: January 30, 2005
- Genre: Pop; R&B
- Length: Approx. 98 minutes
- Language: English
- Label: Warner Music Philippines
- Director: Marla Ancheta
- Producer: Ricky R. Ilacad; Neil C. Gregorio

Nina chronology
Nina Videoke (2005)	Nina Live! (2005)	Nina Videoke 2 (2008)

Nina Live! is the second video release by Filipina singer Nina. It is a recording of her most successful album Nina Live!, which was released in February 2005. It was released in karaoke-VCD and DVD formats on May 28, 2005 by Warner Music Philippines. Nina Live! is the first ever complete live DVD that was released in the Philippines. It contains the whole live session and several bonus features.

This material was also released as the live album Nina Live!.

== Track listing ==
1. "Sweet Thing"
2. "Love Moves in Mysterious Ways"
3. "Stay (With Me)"
4. "Burn" (featuring Christian Bautista)
5. "Through the Fire"
6. "Fall for You"
7. "Coloured Kisses" (featuring Trapp of Dice & K9)
8. "Cool with You"
9. "Constantly"
10. "At Your Best"
11. "Sunlight"
12. "The Closer I Get to You" (featuring Thor)
13. "Steep"
14. "I Love You Goodbye"
15. "I Can't Tell You Why"
16. "Piano in the Dark"
17. "Anything for You"
18. "Time to Say Goodbye"

== Bonus features ==
- "I Don't Want to Be Your Friend" (video)
- Videoke mode
- Biography
- Discography
- Photo gallery
- Interview with Nina

== Audio modes ==
- Stereo
- Stereo karaoke
- 5.1 Surround sound

== Personnel ==
Credits were taken from Nina Live! liner notes.

- Marla Ancheta – director
- Dexter Ayala – bass guitar, back-up vocals
- Christian Bautista – lead vocals
- Chris Buenviaje – lead guitar, acoustic guitar, electric guitar, back-up vocals
- Leo Espocia – drums, back-up vocals
- Nina Girado – lead vocals
- Neil C. Gregorio – album producer
- Ricky R. Ilacad – executive producer
- Rico Sobrevinas – saxophone, back-up vocals
- Thor – lead vocals
- Trapp – rap vocals
- Derek Tupas – keyboards, back-up vocals

== Certifications ==
Country	Provider	Certification	Sales
Philippines	PARI	Platinum	30,000+
