= Make You Mine (Nina song) =

Single by Nina

from the album Smile
- Released: December 2003
- Genre: Pop, R&B
- Length: 3:58
- Label: Warner Music Philippines
- Songwriter: The 33rd
- Producer: The 33rd

Nina singles chronology
| "Loving You" (2003) | "Make You Mine" (2003) | "A Girl Can Dream" (2004) |

"Make You Mine" is a song by Filipino singer Nina from her second studio album Smile. It was released alongside the album as its lead single in December 2003 by Warner Music Philippines. The song was written and produced by The 33rd, and features a rap verse performed by rapper Picasso. "Make You Mine" differed from the previous singles Nina was known for. Its upbeat groove and flirty lyrics allowed her to transcend the typical "love song syndrome" most Filipino artists are known for, and spun a reinvented image for the singer. The song talks about a girl who fell in love at first sight with a boy, and could not stop thinking about him and wants to make the boy hers.

The song was praised by OPM critics and reviewers, who called the song "a blissful listening experience". It also stood out above other releases at that time, with its different sound and lyrics, allowing Nina to transcend the typical Filipino "love song syndrome". Commercially, the song was a surprise hit. "Make You Mine" was accompanied by a music video, where Nina is seen buying toys with her friends. She then crushes on a guy she sees at the toy store.

== Background ==
=== Development ===
After the success of Nina's 2002 debut album, Heaven, it was obligatory that she releases another record in the following year. Her debut was heavily influenced by jazzy lounge pop-R&B similar to the sound of international music at that time. Warner Music Philippines kept the sound she started with and made it even bigger. While the re-release of Heaven was being sent out to the market, the label has already started production for her second album in 2003. The production was a bit rushed, since the album needed to be released before the year ended. Under Warner's managing head at that time, Ricky Ilacad, the label collaborated with more international songwriters, arrangers and producers for the second project. These include The 33rd, Cuban American composer-producer Rudy Pérez, Zomba record-production acts Sean Hosein, Dane DeViller, Andy Goldmark and Swedish composer Jörgen Elofsson. The album resembles the same sound from its predecessor, but only bigger and bolder in terms of incorporating urban-style to upbeat rhythmic jams and harmonic sound to powerful sentimental ballads.

=== Release ===
"Make You Mine" was immediately released in December 2003 as a follow-up to Nina's string of hits. Critical and commercial response to both the song and the album were great especially, since the song differed from the previous singles Nina was known for. Its upbeat groove and flirty lyrics allowed Nina to transcend the typical "love song syndrome" most Filipino artists are known for, and spun a reinvented image for the Soul Siren. On June 21, 2005, the song was released on digital download through iTunes and Amazon.com MP3 Download.

== Composition ==
"Make You Mine"
A sample of the song, featuring upbeat groove and flirty lyrics different from the typical "love song syndrome".

"Make You Mine" is an uptempo song, that blends the sound of contemporary R&B and hip-hop, with a touch of bubblegum pop. The song has a rich harmonic chemistry of Nina's mesmerizing vocals and hypnotic urban-style beats with a blend of funky strings. It is described as "an upbeat R&B piece that offers a blissful listening experience." It features a rap verse performed by Picasso. The song reinvented Nina's image, since it differed from her previous love-ballad releases. It showcases upbeat groove and flirty lyrics, that is heavily influenced by American urban music. Her whistle register on the song ranges from G♯6 to A6, and is performed repetitively throughout the bridge until it fades.

== Music video ==
Nina holding a big teddy bear in the music video.

The music video for "Make You Mine" was shot at Toy Kingdom. It features Nina and rapper Picasso in the toy store, where Nina is seen buying toys with a group of friends, when they spot a man she begins crushing on. Picasso enters the scene to rap as Nina sings the song.

=== Synopsis ===
The video starts off with Nina and her two girl friends roaming around a toy store and tinkering with whatever toys they find. Nina wears a pink top and jeans, similar to Mariah Carey's outfit in her music video for "Heartbreaker". A guy wearing a blue shirt is then shown. Nina later spots the guy, and starts crushing on him. To get the guy's attention, she and her friends started dancing, playing around and hugging each other behind the guy, while he is looking for toys. A scene, where Nina's friends give her various stuff toys until she gets covered up by the toys, is then shown. Picasso later enters the scene, rapping. Nina's friends are then shown giving her a toy car with a remote control, and she directs the car until it bumps to the guy's feet. The three hide behind the toy cars, as the guy looks behind him. Scenes where Nina sings to the song, while dancing are inserted into different parts of the video.

== Live performances ==
In December 2003, Nina transferred from GMA to ABS-CBN. She signed a contract with musical variety TV show ASAP Mania and launched her album on the show, singing "Make You Mine". On January 30, 2004, she performed the song on her album launching at Greenbelt 3 Park, singing also other tracks in the album. Early in 2005, she returned to MYX Live! hosted by Rico Blanco. She sang songs from the album including the three covers, "A Girl Can Dream", "Shoo-Bee-Doo" and "I'll Always Stay in Love This Way". She also performed "The Christmas Song" (from Warner's All Star Christmas Collection) and "I Don't Want to Be Your Friend" (from Diane Warren Presents Love Songs).
