= Last December =

Last December may refer to:

- "Last December", song by Butcher Babies from ...'Til the World's Blind
- "Last December", song by Iced Earth from Burnt Offerings
- "Last December", song by Letters from the Fire from Worth the Pain
- "Last December", song by Nina Nesbitt from The Sun Will Come Up, the Seasons Will Change
- "Last December", song by Prince from The Rainbow Children

== See also ==
- December (disambiguation)
- "Back to December", song by Taylor Swift
