= December (disambiguation) =

December is the twelfth and the final month of the year.

December may also refer to:

- December (Roman month), the tenth month of the Roman calendar

== Books ==
- December (magazine), an art, prose, and poetry journal founded in 1958
- "December", a 1994 poem by Patti Smith from Early Work
- December, a mystery novel by Phil Rickman, 2011
- December (comics), a mutant character created by Marvel Comics
- December, by Eve Bunting David Diaz (illustrator), 1997
- December, by Elizabeth Hartley Winthrop, 2008

== Film and television ==
- December (1988 film), an Indian Malayalam-language film
- December (1991 film), an American drama war
- December (2008 film), a Brazilian drama
- December (2010 film), an American drama
- December (2022 Japanese film), a Japanese legal drama
- December (2024 film), a Russian period crime thriller
- "December", a Series D episode of the television series QI (2006)

== Fictional characters ==
- December "Dess" Holiday, an as-of-yet unseen character in Deltarune

== Music ==
- December (musical duo), a South Korean musical duo

=== Albums ===
- December (Chris Botti album) (2002)
- December (George Winston album) (1982)
- December (Kenny Loggins album) (1998)
- December (The Moody Blues album) (2003)

=== EPs ===
- December (Gabrielle Aplin and Hannah Grace EP) (2018)
- December (Reigan Derry EP) (2015)

=== Songs ===
- "December" (Collective Soul song)
- "December" (Måns Zelmerlöw song)
- "December" (The Waterboys song)
- "December" by Adam Lambert, from the album Take One
- "December" by Ariana Grande, from the album Christmas & Chill (2015)
- "December" by Assemblage 23, from the album Endure (2016)
- "December" by Charles Ives (1874-1954)
- "December" by Earth, Wind & Fire, from the album Holiday (2014), based on their song "September"
- "December" by Kenny Loggins, from the album December (1998)
- "December" by Kira Kosarin
- "December" by Neck Deep, from the album Life's Not out to Get You (2015)
- "December" by Pride & Fall, from the album Nephesh (2003)
- "December" by Sara Bareilles, from the album The Blessed Unrest (2013)
- "December" by Static-X, from the album Wisconsin Death Trip (1999)
- "December" by Unwound, from the album Leaves Turn Inside You (2001)
- "December" by Weezer, from the album Maladroit (2002)

== See also ==
- December Avenue (disambiguation)
- William Q. MacLean Jr., a legislator nicknamed "Mr. December"
