= Smile (Nina Girado album) =

Studio album by Nina
- Released: December 12, 2003
- Recorded: 2003
- Studio: Pinknoise Studio (Quezon City, Philippines)
- Genre: Pop, R&B
- Length: 49:35
- Language: English, Tagalog
- Label: Warner Music Philippines
- Producer: Ricky R. Ilacad, Neil C. Gregorio, The 33rd, Ferdie Marquez, Mike Luis

Nina chronology
Heaven (2002)	Smile (2003)	Nina Live! (2005)

Singles from Smile
- 1. "Make You Mine" Released: November 2003; 2. "A Girl Can Dream" Released: February 2004; 3. "Sayang Naman" Released: May 2004

Smile is the second studio album by Filipino singer Nina, released in the Philippines on December 12, 2003 by Warner Music Philippines. The album is the follow-up to her successful debut album. Ricky Ilacad, head of Warner label, assigned a few international songwriters and arrangers, including Jörgen Elofsson and Rudy Pérez, to collaborate with the label on the production of the album, which is noticeably broader compared to the first project. For the first time, Nina herself co-wrote a song, "Can't Say I Love You", which made it to the final cut. The album contains three cover versions of songs by Madonna, Baron Barbers and Cris Villonco.

Upon release, the album received generally favorable reviews from music critics. Many of which pointed out the "melodic catchiness" compared to Heaven, but criticized the songwriting, lack of depth and failure to produce potential hits. In 2004, it was certified gold by the Philippine Association of the Record Industry (PARI). On June 21, 2005, it was made available on digital download through iTunes and Amazon.com MP3 Download. In 2009, the song "What If" was covered by Korean boy band Super Junior for their album Sorry, Sorry. To date, the album has sold more than 30,000 units in the Philippines, certifying platinum by the PARI.

Three successful commercial singles were released from the album. "Make You Mine", the lead single, became Nina’s third number one single in the country, allowing her to be the first and only female OPM artist to have three number one singles in a span of one year. "A Girl Can Dream" was released as the second single and it performed well on Philippine charts. It did not reach number one, however, but she managed to popularize the song and make it her own, even if it was originally recorded by another artist. "Sayang Naman" is the first Tagalog single by Nina and the last commercial single from the album. It was released due to high demand and requests by fans and listeners. Despite this, the song did not perform on charts as well as her previous releases.

== Background ==
After the success of Nina's 2002 debut album, Heaven, it was obligatory that she releases another record in the following year. Her debut was heavily influenced by jazzy lounge pop-R&B, similar to the sound of international music at that time. For that reason, it was unacceptable to break the formula. Instead of directing into a different musical path, Warner Music kept the sound she started with and made it even bigger. While the special edition re-release of Heaven was being sent out to the market, the label has already started production for her second album in 2003. The production was a bit rushed, since the album needed to be released before the year ended. Under Warner's managing head at that time, Ricky Ilacad, the label collaborated with more international songwriters, arrangers and producers for the second project. These include The 33rd, Cuban American composer-producer Rudy Pérez, Zomba record-production acts Sean Hosein, Dane DeViller, Andy Goldmark and Swedish composer Jörgen Elofsson. Mike Luis of Freestyle joined the production, writing two songs for the album. The album was named after one song that made it to the final cut, "Smile".

== Writing and composition ==
"Can't Say I Love You"
A sample of the song, featuring the sensually engaging sound and lyrics Nina incorporated with Ruffinego.

Smile resembles the same sound from Nina's debut, but only bigger and bolder in terms of incorporating urban-style upbeat rhythmic jams and sentimental ballads. During the production process of the album, Nina showcased her versatility by taking on upbeat pop-R&B material and soulful acoustic ballads.

"I play a little bit of the guitar and the piano, pero kina-career ko na ngayon ang pagpa-piano [but right now, playing the piano is what I'm focusing on]."

—Nina, on the instruments she learned to play to help her write music.

Neil Gregorio co-produced all the songs in the album. "Can't Say I Love You" is the first ever song written by Nina, to be included on her album. Its music was handed by Emanuele Ruffinego. The song was notably described as a "sensually engaging ballad." The album includes three revivals of songs that were not really familiar to listeners—"A Girl Can Dream" (originally by Cris Villonco), "Shoo-Bee-Doo" (originally by Madonna) and "I'll Always Stay In Love This Way" (originally by Baron Barbers). "Goodnite But Not Goodbye" was composed and arranged by Roxanne Seeman, John Keller and Stephen Oberhoff. It is one of the complex songs in the album in terms of sound engineering. The 33rd composed, mixed and produced "Make You Mine", which was released as the first single of the album. The song has a rich harmonic chemistry of Nina's mesmerizing vocals and hypnotic urban-style beats with a blend of funky strings. It is described as an "upbeat R&B piece that offers a blissful listening experience." Rudy Pérez co-wrote "Still Gonna Be" with Allan Rich and Mark Portman. The song starts with an a cappella arrangement. Bass and percussion were added in it within the first chorus. Mike Luis and Ferdie Marquez were assigned to most of the jobs, including production, arrangement, mixing, sequence and programming, vocal supervision, and back-up.

== Critical reception ==
Professional ratings
Review scores
Source	Rating
Philippine Daily Inquirer	(favorable)
The Philippine Star	(favorable)

Smile received favorable response, being praised for its "melodic catchiness" but was criticized for the songs' lack of depth. Noelani Torre of Philippine Daily Inquirer described the album as "smoothly-produced", stating "There are 12 songs in Smile, and none of them space-fillers or lengtheners. Most of them are soft and gently rhythmic." She was critical of Nina's songwriting in "Can't Say I Love You", calling it "worded too prosaically with instances of faulty grammar". The Philippine Star was more positive, commenting that the album "showcases [Nina]'s musical versatility. Tinged with upbeat rhythmic jams and powerful sentimental ballads". The lead single "Make You Mine" was called "an upbeat R&B piece that offers a blissful listening experience".

== Commercial performance ==
The album did not match the commercial success of her previous debut album Heaven (2002). Smile had sold 15,000 copies as of 2004 receiving a gold certification in the Philippines by PARI.

== Singles ==
"Make You Mine"
A sample of the song, featuring upbeat groove and flirty lyrics different from the typical "love song syndrome".

"A Girl Can Dream"
A sample of the song, featuring "love triangle" lyrics and slow-tempo arrangement reminiscent to "Jealous".

In December 2003, Nina released the album alongside the first single "Make You Mine". The song features rap parts by Pinoy hip hop artist Picasso. The reception was great, especially since it differed from the singles she was known for. Its upbeat groove and flirty lyrics allowed her to transcend the typical "love song syndrome" most Filipino artists are known for, and spun a reinvented image for the Soul Siren. The song was number one in the country, making Nina the first and only female artist to have three number one singles in a single year. In 2004, "A Girl Can Dream" was released as the second single in early 2004. Although Nina popularized the song, Cris Villonco originally recorded it in 2000. Like her number one hit "Jealous", it talks about a love triangle, but brings forth a more optimistic view in love. The music video features labelmate Christian Bautista as her love interest. "Sayang Naman" was the first Tagalog single released by Nina and became the last commercial single from the album. It was released due to positive reception and massive requests. Though the song failed to establish the same impact as the previous hits, it was praised for its ability to maintain consistency with the album's focus.

=== Other songs ===
Two radio-only singles were released in the form of the Madonna original "Shoo-Bee-Doo" and the Baron Barbers original "I'll Always Stay in Love This Way", allowing the album to reach platinum status by the Philippine Association of the Record Industry (PARI). In 2004, "What If" was used in the film Masikip sa Dibdib (which starred Rufa Mae Quinto), where Nina starred in a cameo role, performing the song back to back with Kyla, Karylle and Anna Fegi.

== Promotion ==
In December 2003, Nina transferred from GMA to ABS-CBN. She signed a contract with musical variety TV show ASAP Mania and launched her album on the show, singing the Smile's first single, "Make You Mine". On January 30, 2004, she performed on her album launching at Greenbelt 3 Park, singing most of the album's tracks. Early in 2005, she returned to MYX Live! hosted by Rico Blanco. She sang songs from the album including the two covers, "Shoo-Bee-Doo" and "I'll Always Stay in Love This Way". She also performed "The Christmas Song" (from Warner's All Star Christmas Collection) and "I Don't Want to Be Your Friend" (from Diane Warren Presents Love Songs).

Like Heaven's singles, music videos of the album's songs have playful storylines and youthful ideas, and also uses special visual effects. Music videos of the album's singles received heavy rotation on MYX and MTV Philippines.

== Accolades ==
Despite the impressive chart performance of the first single "Make You Mine" and a Christmas release, Smile opened to moderate initial sales, with less successful impact to the public compared to Nina's debut album, Heaven. On the 2004 Awit Awards, the album only had two nominations—including Best R&B song for "Di Ba" and Best Engineered Recording for "Goodnite But Not Goodbye". It won her the Best Engineered Recording category, but lost the other award to "I Will Find You" by Kyla. The album also failed to have any nomination on the MTV Pilipinas Music Awards 2004. The album, though, was recognized for its heavy influence of R&B, soul and "melodic catchiness". In 2004, the Philippine Business Excellence Award/Awards and Recognition Association of the Philippines named Nina as the "No. 1 Female R&B Singer in the Philippines". In addition, Mega Magazine listed her as one of the "Women to Watch" in 2004. In the same year, she was recognized as one of the "10 Best Singers in the Philippines" by the Tinig Awards, along with veteran singers Regine Velasquez, Ogie Alcasid, Gary Valenciano and Jaya.

Due to the chart-topping success of the carrier single "Make You Mine", MTV Philippines and 97.1 WLS-FM made Nina their Artist of the Month for January 2004. On the first ever Philippine Hip-Hop Music Awards in 2005, she was nominated for Female R&B Artist of the Year, but lost the award to Kyla. Also in 2005, she was awarded as the Best Female Acoustic Artist by the National Consumers Quality Awards.

== Track listing ==
All tracks were produced or co-produced by Neil Gregorio; additional producers are listed below.

No.	Title	Writer(s)	Producer(s)	Length
1.	"Make You Mine" (featuring Picasso)	The 33rd	The 33rd	3:58
2.	"A Girl Can Dream"	Jimmy Santis, Nina Ossoff, Steve Skinner	Ferdie Marquez	4:15
3.	"What If"	Sean Hosein, Dane DeViller, Andy Goldmark, Jörgen Elofsson	Marquez	3:49
4.	"Sayang Naman (English: What a Waste)"	Emil Pama	Mike Luis	4:26
5.	"Shoo-Bee-Doo"	Madonna	Marquez	4:41
6.	"Goodnite But Not Goodbye"	Roxanne Seeman, John Keller, Stephen Oberhoff	Marquez	3:44
7.	"I'll Always Stay in Love This Way"	Boy Katindig	Marquez	4:33
8.	"Still Gonna Be"	Allan Rich, Mark Portman, Rudy Pérez	Marquez	3:48
9.	"Di Ba (English: Isn't It)"	Luis	Luis	3:38
10.	"Can't Say I Love You"	Nina Girado, Emanuele Ruffinego	Marquez	4:37
11.	"Ring Me"	Luis	Luis	4:19
12.	"Smile"	David Martin, Johnny Douglas	Marquez	3:44

Notes

- Track 2 was originally recorded by Cris Villonco.
- Track 5 was originally recorded by Madonna.
- Track 7 was originally recorded by Baron Barbers.
- Track 8 was re-titled as "Still Be Lovin' You" on some copy prints.

== Personnel ==
Credits taken from Smile's liner notes.

Production

- The 33rd – producer, mixing
- Nikki Cunanan – vocal recording
- Dane DeViller – arranger
- Jörgen Elofsson – arranger
- Andy Goldmark – arranger
- Neil C. Gregorio – A&R administration, producer
- Sean Hosein – arranger
- Ricky R. Ilacad – A&R administration, executive producer
- John Keller – arranger
- Mike Luis – producer, arranger, programming, mixing, vocal supervision
- Ferdie Marquez – producer, arranger, mixing, sequence and programming
- Arnie Mendaros – vocal supervision
- Stephen Oberhoff – arranger
- Rudy Pérez – arranger
- Mark Portman – arranger
- Radha – vocal supervision
- Allan Rich – arranger
- Gerry Samson – mixing
- Roxanne Seeman – arranger

Musicians

- Nina Girado – lead vocals, back-up vocals
- Mike Luis – back-up vocals
- Edil Luyon – acoustic guitar
- Ferdie Marquez – back-up vocals
- Noel Mendez – acoustic guitar
- Picasso – rap vocals

Album design

- Garl Buenavista – photography and design
- Chris Genuino (of WMP Creative) – digital imaging and final art
- Anne Poblador – album concept and styling

Recording locations

- Pinknoise Studio (Quezon City, Philippines) – vocal recording
- Chili Red Studio (NYL REVISIS) – sequencing and mastering

== Certifications ==
Country	Provider	Certification	Sales
Philippines	PARI	Platinum	30,000+

== Release history ==
Country	Edition	Release date	Label	Catalogue
Philippines	Standard (CD)	December 12, 2003	Warner Music	50467-1076-2
South Korea	Standard (CD)	June 21, 2005	Warner Music	643443173063
United States	Standard (digital download)	June 21, 2005	WEA	
