= Janet Basco =

Filipino singer

- Born: Janet Macabasco
- Occupation: Singer
- Spouse: Johnny Revilla (m. 1987)

Janet Macabasco is a Filipino singer. She is known for her hits "You Made Me Live Again", "Minsan Pa", and "My Girl, My Woman, My Friend" in a duet with Jose Mari Chan. In the music video version of this song, she is seen sitting on the sofa eating popcorn and has a date with him.

== Biography ==
Her singing career began after winning first prize in a singing contest at Student Canteen.

== Personal life ==
She is married to a TV host, actor, sports commentator and politician, Johnny Revilla with whom she has 4 children.
