= Constant Change =

Studio album by Jose Mari Chan
- Released: May 25, 1989
- Recorded: 1989
- Genres: Pop, adult contemporary
- Label: Universal
- Producer: Jose Mari Chan

Jose Mari Chan chronology
A Golden Collection (1985)	Constant Change (1989)	Christmas in Our Hearts (1990)

Constant Change is the sixth studio album by Filipino singer-songwriter Jose Mari Chan. It was released in the Philippines on May 25, 1989, by Universal Records. The album has produced "Beautiful Girl", "Please Be Careful with My Heart", "My Girl, My Woman, My Friend" and "I Have Fallen in Love (With the Same Woman Three Times)". Later in June 1991, it belatedly won the Awit Award for Album of the Year. It was also declared the first ever album in the Philippines in 1990 to reach the Diamond status by the Philippine Association of the Record Industry (PARI), and is currently the second biggest-selling album in the Philippines with sales of over 800,000 units in the country. According to the Manila Standard, Constant Change also became the most popular foreign album in Indonesia by July 1990.

The album was later made available on digital download through iTunes.

== Background ==
Chan was in his twenty-second year as a recording artist when Universal released Constant Change. He described the history of the title track's composition in the following statement:

“I wrote "Constant Change" while making the transition from living in New York back to Manila. I was on a plane looking at the clouds pass swiftly by, changing form faster than the wink of an eye. The song reflects the ‘frightening pace at which we live our days’ — you know, constantly changing ‘like clouds that move across the skies,’ reminding us to maintain our sense of childlike wonder and simplicity before we ‘grow too old for tales of knights’ and ‘losing our Peter Pan and wings.’ Throughout the ‘90s, many high-school classes adopted "Constant Change" as graduation theme song.”

== Composition ==
"I Have Fallen in Love (With the Same Woman Three Times) is a poem written by Ninoy Aquino for his wife, President Cory Aquino. Chan incorporated music with the poem to make it a song. According to Chan, "Sing Me Your Song Again, Daddy" was played during wedding receptions as young brides danced with their fathers. "Beautiful Girl" inspired the Seiko movie of the same title, starring Gretchen Barretto. Chan narrated the story behind the song, saying "It’s about a pretty girl I saw from a distance but never got to meet. She was like a fragment of a lovely melody that comes to a songwriter in the dark of night, only to lose it at the break of day".

== Track listing ==
All tracks were produced by Jose Mari Chan.

1. "Constant Change"
2. "Beautiful Girl" (3:12)
3. "Please Be Careful with My Heart" (with Regine Velasquez) (3:33)
4. "No Rewind, No Replay"
5. "Sing Me Your Song Again, Daddy" (featuring Cherie Gil)
6. "Can't We Start Over Again"
7. "The Sound of Life"
8. "My Girl, My Woman, My Friend" (with Janet Basco)
9. "I Have Fallen in Love (With the Same Woman Three Times)"
10. "Stay, My Love"
11. "Be Gentle"
12. "So I'll Go"
13. "Can't We Start Over Again" (reprise)

Note: In the first track, Peter Pan has been mentioned. "The Sound of Life" is the only instrumental piece of this album.

== Certifications and sales ==
Region	Certification	Certified units/sales
Philippines (PARI)	Diamond	800,000
Indonesia (ASIRI)	Platinum	75,000
Malaysia	Gold	25,000

== See also ==
- List of best-selling albums in the Philippines
