= Itsumo =

Single by Dice and K9 featuring Hi-C

from the album MOBBSTARR
- Language: English; Japanese
- English title: Always
- Released: June 12, 2004
- Genre: Hip-hop
- Length: 4:15
- Label: 6000 Goonz
- Songwriters: Wolfren Villarino Rosaroso; Miguel Labucay Calina; Honeyleen Concepcion Rosaroso
- Producers: Dice and K9

Dice and K9 singles chronology
"Bounce" (2003)	"Itsumo" (2004)	"Best Friends" (2004)

"Itsumo" (lit. 'Always') is a song by Filipino hip hop duo Dice and K9 featuring Hi-C, released on June 12, 2004, from their second album MOBBSTARR. The song features rap verses by Wolfren Rosaroso (DiCE) and Miguel Calina (K-9), while Honey Rosaroso (Hi-C) performs the chorus in Japanese. It became an accidental hit after its first radio play in Cebu and later gained nationwide airplay.

== Background and composition ==
Wolfren Rosaroso wanted to record with Miguel Salinas for his label 6000 Goonz. Their first collaboration track "Bounce" (2003), became a hit in Cebu. Afterward, two more members, Hi-C and Trapp, joined, and the group adopted the name Dice and K9 Mobbstarr.

"Itsumo" was originally a filler track on the album MOBBSTARR, after they were unable to clear a Tracy Chapman sample for another song. K9 used a Japanese instrument to replace another track that couldn't be cleared due to a sample issue. The song gradually became popular after K9's brother, a DJ at Monster BT105.9 in Cebu, played it on air. Listener requests flooded the station, turning the song into a local hit. The song is a hip hop and romance rap with Japanese elements in the chorus. "Itsumo" means "always" in Japanese.

== Music video ==
The official music video was shot in a Japanese convenience store and was featured on Philippine music channels including Myx and MTV Philippines. In 2024, Dice, K9, and Hi-C released a 20th anniversary version of the music video shot in Japan.

== Reception ==
"Itsumo" became one of the first Cebuano hip hop songs to gain nationwide recognition. It was a nominated for Favorite Song at the MTV Video Music Awards Philippines in 2005.

=== Lyrics analysis ===
The song includes rap verses performed by Dice and K9, with Hi-C singing the chorus in Japanese. The song lyrics express themes of love and loyalty. The original Japanese chorus had grammatical errors. Japanese content creators SkyGarden noted that phrases like "kokoro we hoshi" should be "kokoro ga hoshi", "uchitemo" should be "ochitemo", and the word "eroi" was used incorrectly, as it actually means "erotic" rather than expressing love. The chorus as corrected: "Itsumo kokoro ga hoshi itsuka, Dare katu mata koi nei ochitemo, Itsumo kokoro ni iru itsumo, Anata dake no basho ga aru kara."

== Credits and personnel ==
Credits adapted from Apple Music.

- Dice (Wolfren Villarino Rosaroso) – songwriter, rap vocals
- K9 (Miguel Labucay Calina) – songwriter, rap vocals
- Hi-C (Honeyleen Concepcion Rosaroso) – songwriter, chorus vocals

== Accolades ==
Award	Year	Category	Result	Ref.
MTV Video Music Awards (Philippines)	2005	Favorite Song	Nominated	
