= Jose Mari Chan =

Filipino singer (born 1945)

Jose Mari Chan 曾煥福
- Chan in 2008

Background information
- Also known as: Joe Mari Chan, Mr. Music Man
- Born: José Mari Chan y Lim; March 11, 1945 (age 81); Iloilo City, Philippine Commonwealth
- Origin: Bacolod, Negros Occidental, Philippines
- Genres: Adult contemporary, easy listening, pop, Christmas
- Instruments: Vocals; piano; guitar
- Years active: 1966–present
- Labels: Top Tunes; Universal Records; Signature Music Inc.
- Website: josemarichan.com

Chinese name
- Traditional Chinese: 曾煥福
- Simplified Chinese: 曾焕福
Transcriptions
Standard Mandarin
- Hanyu Pinyin: Céng Huànfú
Southern Min
- Hokkien POJ: Chan Hoàn-hok

Jose Mari Lim Chan (Tagalog: [hoˈse mɐˈɾi ˈtʃan]; born José Mari Chan y Lim; March 11, 1945), is a Filipino singer and songwriter. Regarded as one of the country's most renowned balladeers and composers, he is popularly dubbed as the "King of Philippine Christmas Carols". As of 2001, Chan has sold two million albums and has garnered 37 platinum records to his credit, becoming one of the best-selling Filipino recording artists of all time. He is best known for his signature song "Christmas in Our Hearts", which is the biggest selling Filipino Christmas song in history, including hits such as "A Perfect Christmas", "Beautiful Girl" and "Please Be Careful with My Heart".

Chan began a career in 1967 and released his debut album Deep in My Heart in 1969. He has since released 14 studio albums, most notable being Constant Change (1989) and Christmas in Our Hearts (1990). The two albums became major successes for Chan, both were certified double Diamond by the Philippine Association of the Record Industry and becoming two of the best-selling albums in the Philippines. With a career spanning five decades, he has been honored by various award-giving bodies such as the Lifetime Achievement Award from PMPC Star Awards for Music, and two "Album of the Year" from Awit Awards.

== Early life ==
Chan was born José Mari Chan y Lim on March 11, 1945, in Iloilo City and was the first-born child of Antonio Chan and Florencia Lim. His father was an immigrant from Fujian, China who came to the Philippines at age 13 and started a sugar trading company in Bacolod. Chan's mother was the only child of a Chinese-Filipino couple.

Chan was exposed to music in his childhood with his maternal grandmother from Cebu often playing music at their house and his mother being a pianist. He was an alumnus of Sacred Heart School-Jesuit (the now Ateneo de Cebu). He was also accompanied by the family's house helper to participate in the radio program Children's Hour on DYRI where children performed the piano, sang, and recited poetry. At school he was often selected to perform in school programs. Paul Anka and Neil Sedaka are among the songwriters which served as his inspiration in his childhood. Chan wrote his first song at age 13.

Chan's father was supportive of his involvement in Children's Hour but was reluctant of supporting his music career by the time he was age 14 or 15 when he began composing songs. His father was concerned their Chinese background would put Chan at a disadvantage in the music industry and encouraged him to relegate his music pursuits as a hobby and to pursue a business career instead. When Chan reminded the older gentleman that he did have a flair for composing, he was told that that particular field "would not be enough to support a family".

He attended the Ateneo de Manila University where he met fellow musician Ramon Jacinto of RJ & the Riots. He graduated with a Bachelor of Arts Degree in Economics in 1967.

== Early career ==
Chan first appeared on the local scene as a guest on Pilita Corrales's program An Evening with Pilita in 1965. The next year, he became the host and singer of a television show called 9 Teeners of ABS-CBN 3 (now ABS-CBN 2) which aired on weekdays and Saturday in 1966. Since he was a junior student at that time at Ateneo and he was being encouraged to become a businessman, his father only consented his involvement if he was not paid salary for the stint. His first single "Afterglow" was released in 1967. He would release his first album two years later, after he was approached by an independent record producer.

== Musical career ==
=== 1969-1975 ===
His first long playing album, Deep in My Heart, was issued in 1969 by Dyna Records. In 1973, he represented the Philippines in at the World Popular Song Festival in Tokyo where his song "Can We Just Stop And Talk Awhile" went into the final entries. For more or less than four years from 1970 to 1974, Jose Mari Chan was able to compose more than 20 songs for movies and earned him different recognitions and nominations at the Filipino Academy of Movie Arts and Sciences Awards (FAMAS Awards). He also wrote several well-loved commercial jingles, among which are the Philippine Airlines' "Love at Thirty Thousand Feet", the Knorr Chinese Soup jingle, and the Alaska Milk jingle. Between 1974 and 1975, he was the Star of a series of Television Network Specials spotlighting his words and music.

=== 1975-1988 ===
In 1975, he moved to the United States to run a branch office of their family's sugar business and remained there for 11 years, continuously composing songs as well. Some of which were recorded by foreign artists. In 1986, he returned to the Philippines and made a comeback to the music industry with the release of his album A Golden Collection, a compilation of his hits, along with a brand-new composition "Tell Me Your Name" which re-introduced him to a younger audience. The album was released in the Philippines by WEA Records. On February 14, 1988, Chan performed at the Manila restaurant within the Manila Hotel as a guest act for Joey Albert's Valentine's Day dinner concert "Here's to Love", his first live performance in years.

=== 1989-1994 ===
In 1989, he released his album Constant Change. It was named Album of the Year by the Awit Awards, the local equivalent of the American Grammy Awards and reached the Diamond Record in terms of sales. The Diamond Award is given to albums or singles selling ten million units or more. It was also sold in other Asian countries such as Malaysia, Singapore and Indonesia. In 1990, his Christmas album, Christmas in Our Hearts was released. It reached triple platinum status that same year, eventually earning the Double Diamond Record Award in 1995, for selling over 20 million units. The significant popularity of his iconic Christmas songs and the album during the holiday season annually earned him the title "Father of Philippine Christmas Music".

=== 1994-present ===
In 1994, he released his eighth album, Thank You Love, where he has another song "Is She Thinking About Me" with Christine Bersola-Babao and another Christmas song, "Christmas Past". His 2001 album A Heart's Journey won Album of the year in the Awit Awards. In 2005, he composed "We're All Just One" as the theme song of the 2005 Southeast Asian Games. In 2007, he released his 12th album Love Letters and Other Souvenirs.

In 2009, Chan was inducted to the Philippines Eastwood City Walk Of Fame. In 2010, Chan was awarded as MYX Magna Award Winner in the MYX Music Awards 2010 for awarding as a contribution for being a singer, composer and also a businessman & TV host. In 2011, he released his 13th full-length album, The Manhattan Connection: The Songs of Jose Mari Chan. The album, which was produced by Janis Siegel of The Manhattan Transfer. The songs were reimagined by music producer Yaron Gershovsky. In 2012, he released his 14th overall album Going Home to Christmas. It was his second Christmas album after 22 years since Christmas in Our Hearts was released in 1990.

== Business career ==
He is the chairman and chief executive officer of Binalbagan-Isabela Sugar Company Inc. (BISCOM) and A. Chan Sugar Corporation as of 2018. Upon the encouragement of his father, Chan became involved in the family business in 1967 right after he graduated from Ateneo. He later inherited the business from his father. Chan has described his business career as his second priority behind his family affairs and ahead of his music career. In 1975, he had to move to the United States in relation to his family's sugar business and returned to the Philippines in 1986.

== Personal life ==
He is married to Mary Ann Ansaldo and has five children, who likewise have had careers in music. His daughter, Liza, has been featured in several duets with him. His sons Joe and Mike Chan formed a musical duo and released their debut album in 2019 under Star Music. Although currently based in and residing primarily in Metro Manila with his family, Chan maintains his homes in Iloilo and Cebu. Chan is a devout Roman Catholic. Jose Mari Chan is also an honorary alumnus of Central Philippine University in his hometown in Iloilo City.

== Legacy ==
Due to Chan's association with Christmas music in the Philippines, he has been a frequent subject of internet memes during the Christmas season in the country which traditionally starts in September. Because of his popularity during these seasons, he was known as the "King of Filipino Christmas Carols"; a title of which he later disavowed. He is also known as a "renowned Christmas singer" and has been compared to Mariah Carey. He has sold two million albums, gaining 37 platinum records. Due to this, he is known as one of the best-selling Filipino singers of all time.

== Awards ==
Award	Award giving body	Date
Ten Outstanding Young Men of the Philippines for the Arts	Ten Outstanding Young Men Awards	1974
Lifetime Achievement Award	Philippine Association of the Recording Industry	--
Dangal ng Musikang Pilipino Award	Philippine Association of the Recording Industry	--
Antonio C. Barreiro Lifetime Achievement Award	Metro Pop Foundation	--
Elite Platinum Award	ABS-CBN	2005
Dangal ng OPM	Organisasyon ng Pilipinong Mang-aawit	2011
Puso ng Saya Award	GMA Network Sunday Pinasaya	2019

The Bacolod city government in 2018 named him as their adopted son by the Bacolod City Council, and as their honorary mayor during the administration of Mayor Evelio Leonardia for his role in the growth of the Bacolod's sugar industry.

Year	Award giving body	Category	Nominated work	Results
2008	Awit Awards	Best Performance by a Male Recording Artist (Performance Award)	"Windmills of Your Mind"	Nominated
2008	Awit Awards	Best Performance by a Male Recording Artist (People's Choice Award)	"Windmills of Your Mind"	Nominated
2009	Eastwood City Walk Of Fame	Celebrity Inductee	—N/a	Won
2010	MYX Music Awards	MYX Magna Award	—N/a	Won
2019	PMPC Star Awards for Music	Levi Celerio Lifetime Achievement Award	—N/a	Won

== Discography ==
=== Albums ===
- Deep in My Heart (1969)
- Can We Just Stop and Talk Awhile (1973)
- Afterthoughts (1974)
- Here and Now (1975)
- A Golden Collection (1985)
- Constant Change (1989) - 2× Diamond
- Christmas in Our Hearts (1990) - 2× Diamond
- Thank You, Love (1994)
- Strictly Commercial: The Jingles Collection (1997)
- Souvenirs (1998)
- A Heart's Journey (2001) - Awit Awards, Album of the Year
- Love Letters and Other Souvenirs (2007)
- The Manhattan Connection (2011)
- Going Home to Christmas (2012)
- Christmas in Our Hearts: 25th Anniversary Edition (2015)

=== Songs ===
- "Afterglow"/"Pines" (1967)
- "Run Jimmy Run"
- "I Only Live to Love You"/"Night Time"
- "Love Me as Though There Were No Tomorrow"
- "High and Mighty"/"Seventh Dawn" (accompanied by the Sandpipers)
- "This Guy's in Love with You"
- "Deep in My Heart"/"Leave You" (1969)
- "Walk on Girl"
- "Love Is for the Two of Us" (with Pilar Pilapil)
- "Can We Just Stop and Talk Awhile"/"From Day to Day" (1973) - Philippine entry, Yamaha World Popular Song Festival
- "Refrain"/"Times We're In" (1973)
- "What Is a Sweetheart" (1976)
- "A Love to Last a Lifetime"/"A Love Song" (1978)
- "Tell Me Your Name"/"One of Many" (1985)
- "Beautiful Girl" (1989) (also covered by Martin Nievera, Christian Bautista, Parokya Ni Edgar & Ben&Ben)
- "Can't We Start Over Again" (1989)
- "A Perfect Christmas" (1990) (also covered by various OPM artists featuring Ben&Ben, December Avenue, Moira Dela Torre and more)
- "Christmas in Our Hearts" (1990) (also covered by American pop acapella vocal group Pentatonix featuring the Filipino singer Lea Salonga in 2022)
- "A Whole New World" (duet with Lea Salonga) - as part for the Philippine soundtrack release of Disney's Aladdin (1992)
- "Please Be Careful with My Heart" (1989) (duet with Regine Velasquez) - used as the theme for the TV series of ABS-CBN, Be Careful with my Heart
- "Constant Change" (1989)
- "Is She Thinking About Me?" (featuring Christine Bersola-Babao)
- "If We Only Had More Time Together"
- "Easier Said Than Done"
- "Love at Thirty Thousand Feet" (1976) - commercial jingle of the flag carrier of the Philippines, Philippine Airlines
- "My Girl, My Woman, My Friend" (1988) - featuring Janet Basco
- "Perhaps Love" - featuring Liza Chan
- "So I'll Go"
- "Here and Now"
- "Emmanuel" (2001) - official anthem of the 15th World Youth Day in 2000.
- "We're All Just One" (2005) - official anthem of the 2005 Southeast Asian Games (reworked for SM Supermalls during Christmas Season as "Celebrate Christmas at SM Malls")
- "Afraid for Love to Fade" (1976)
- Counterpoint to Lennon & McCartney's "Here, There & Everywhere"
- "Radio Romance" - station identification jingle of Radio Romance 101.9 (now MOR 101.9)
- "Big Beautiful Country" - station identification jingle of the now-defunct television station Banahaw Broadcasting Corporation (BBC2) "now ABS-CBN 2 or now currently known as Kapamilya Channel, A2Z 11 & ALLTV 2"
- "Good Old Fashioned Romance"
- "Part of Your Life"
- "Mr. Songwriter"
- "Sing Me Your Song Again, Daddy" - song by Samantha Chavez (Samantha) on its lead vocals and Mari Chan on its backing vocals
- "No Rewind, No Replay" (1989)
- "Thank You, Love" (2007)
- "The Sound of Life" (1990)
- "Empty Space" (2003) - original by the Bukas Palad Music Ministry
- "Going to the Past"
- "Christmas Past" (1994)
- "Constantly" (2012)
- "Pagdating ng Pasko" (2013) - first Filipino Christmas song

=== Collaborations ===
- Gold Ito! (Dyna Music, 1988)
- Ginintuang Diwa ng Pasko (Universal Records/WEA Records, 1989)
- Maayong Pasko (Universal Records/WEA Records, 1989)
- Jamie Rivera – Lord, Heal Our Land (Star Music, 2001)
- Presence (Universal Records 2002)
- Only Selfless Love 2 (Universal Records, 2003)
- Something More (JesCom Music, 2004)
- Best of OPM Love Songs (Universal Records, 2005)
- Best of OPM Acoustic Hits (Universal Records, 2005)
- OPM Gold Christmas (Universal Records, 2006)
- OPM Superstars Christmas (Universal Records, 2006)
- Sail On...His Most Holy Face (Universal Records, 2006)
- OPM Platinum Christmas (Universal Records, 2007)
- Isang Kinabukasan: A GMA Kapuso Foundation Benefit Album (GMA Music, 2007)
- HOPE... Healing of Pain and Enlightenment (Star Music, 2007)
- No. 1 Signature Hits OPM's Best (Vicor Music Corp., 2008)
- Senti 18 Pinoy Love Hits (Vicor Music Corp., 2008)
- Bongga! (The Biggest Retro OPM Hits) (Universal Records, 2008)
- Bongga! 2 (The Biggest Retro OPM Hits) (Universal Records, 2009)
- Paalam, Maraming Salamat Pres. Aquino (A Memorial Tribute Soundtrack) (Star Music, 2009)
- RJ Duets (MCA Music, 2012)
- A Love to Last (The Official Soundtrack) (Star Music, 2017)

=== Music videos ===
- Christmas in Our Hearts (Original released in 1990, music video + karaoke video releases in 1991 featuring his real life daughter Liza Chan-Parpan; re-released music video exclusive by MYX Channel for MYX Live featuring Julie Ann San Jose as a new version in 2019, and a re-released as a music video with the Chan Clan in 2020)
- A Perfect Christmas (Original released in 1990, music video releases in 1991; re-released music video exclusive by MYX Channel for MYX Live as a new version in 2019)
- A Wish On Christmas Night (Original released in 1990, music video releases in 1991; re-released music video exclusive by MYX Channel for MYX Live as a new version in 2019)
- Do You Hear What I Hear? (Original released in 1990)
- Beautiful Girl (Original released in 1989, music video released in 1991)
- Tell Me Your Name (Original released in 1985, music video released in 1991)
- Christmas Past (Original released in 1994, music video released in 1995)
- Constantly (2012, featuring his best friend guitarman RJ Jacinto)
- Afterglow (2013, featuring his best friend guitarman RJ Jacinto)

== See also ==
- Levi Celerio
