= Christmas in Our Hearts =

Studio album by Jose Mari Chan
- Released: November 17, 1990
- Recorded: 1990 (see recording locations)
- Genres: Christmas, adult contemporary, easy listening, spirituals
- Label: Universal
- Producer: Jose Mari Chan

Jose Mari Chan chronology
Constant Change (1989)	Christmas in Our Hearts (1990)	Thank You Love (1994)

Alternate cover
- 25th Anniversary Edition cover

Singles from Christmas in Our Hearts
- 1. "Christmas in Our Hearts (with Liza Chan)" Released: November 1990; 2. "A Perfect Christmas" Released: December 1990

Christmas in Our Hearts is the seventh studio album and the first Christmas album by Filipino singer-songwriter and businessman Jose Mari Chan. It was released on November 17, 1990, by Universal Records. The album has been certified double diamond by the Philippine Association of the Record Industry (PARI). It is considered to be the first OPM album to surpass the Diamond status. It is currently the biggest-selling album in the Philippines, selling more than 800,000 copies to date. Due to the recurring popularity of the song and album during the annual holiday season, Chan became known to Filipinos as "The Father of Philippine Christmas Music;" a title of which he later disavowed.

The album also features cover versions of "A Christmas Carol", "This Beautiful Day", and "Christmas Children" from the 1970 musical film Scrooge.

The album has been re-released as a 25th Anniversary Edition on iTunes, Spotify, and Spinnr on October 30, 2015.

== Background ==
According to Chan, the title track and first single of the album, "Christmas in Our Hearts", was originally an arrangement titled Ang Tubig Ay Buhay ("Water is Life"), based on a poem written by his friend, Chari Cruz-Zárate. He took him two days to set the words to music, intending to make it a silver jubilee song for the Assumption High School Class of 1963. He described the poetry of Ang Tubig ay Buhay as very beautiful, which he found easy to compose a melody for.

It was a catchy, pretty melody, which I felt was too precious to use only for a Class Homecoming. So I decided to turn it into a Christmas song.

Before production started, Chan had attended Mass at the Santuario de San Antonio Parish in Forbes Park, Makati when a young lyricist named Rina Cañiza knocked on his car window. Cañiza would later replace the poem with the lyrics of "Christmas in Our Hearts", using Chan's melody for Ang Tubig ay Buhay and some of his revisions upon submission. His record producer, Bella Dy Tan, gave her opinion the song would not sell as it was a Christian song, so Chan also wrote, "A Perfect Christmas", which Tan said would be a hit. When Chan played both songs at a press conference, the media and DJs singled out "Christmas in Our Hearts" as their favorite. Tan was astonished to observe that the public loved the song. "Christmas in Our Hearts" eventually became a runaway hit and remains one of the most played songs in public places all over the Philippines.

== Commercial performance ==
Christmas in Our Hearts is the best-selling album not only by Chan, but by an Original Pilipino Music (OPM) artist to date. Just weeks after the album was released, it was certified triple platinum by the Philippine Association of the Record Industry (PARI) in 1990. In December 2006, it was awarded with a Double Diamond certification by the PARI on GMA Network's SOP (Sobrang Okey Pare) for selling more than 600,000 units in the Philippines. It makes Chan the only Filipino artist to achieve the feat, with two Double Diamond albums—the other one being Constant Change. It makes the album the best-selling OPM Christmas album of all time. In addition, it always tops album charts during Christmas season. The album has sold over 800,000 copies in the country to date.

== 25th Anniversary Edition ==
In celebration of 25 years since the album's release, Universal Records announced on their Facebook page that Christmas in Our Hearts is to be re-released in a special 25th Anniversary Edition. It was launched online on iTunes, Spotify and Spinnr on October 30, 2015, and on CD on November 11, 2015.

== Track listing ==
All tracks were produced by Jose Mari Chan.

1. "A Wish on Christmas Night" (Chan, Pinky Valdez)
2. "Do You Hear What I Hear?" (Gloria Shayne, Noël Regney)
3. "Mary's Boy Child" (Jester Hairston)
4. "Christmas in Our Hearts" (with Liza Chan) (Chan, Rina Cañiza)
5. "A Christmas Carol" (featuring the Ateneo Glee Club) (Leslie Bricusse)
6. "A Perfect Christmas" (Chan)
7. "Give Me Your Heart for Christmas" (Robert Goodman)
8. "The Beautiful Day"—Jaymie Magtoto (Bricusse)
9. "The Sound of Life" (Chan, Valdez)
10. "Christmas Children" (Bricusse)
11. "Little Christmas Tree" (Mickey Rooney)
12. "When a Child Is Born" (Ciro Dammicco, Fred Jay)
13. "It Is the Lord!" (Chan, Maria Christina Ansaldo Estrada)
14. "The Lord's Prayer" (Traditional; music composed by Chan)
15. "Count Your Blessings (Instead of Sheep)" (Irving Berlin; additional lyrics by Chan)
16. "May the Good Lord Bless and Keep You" (Meredith Willson)

=== 25th Anniversary Edition bonus track ===
1. "Christmas Past" (Chan, Ocampo)
2. "The Sound of Life (Instrumental)" (Louie Ocampo, Chan, Valdez)

== Personnel ==
Credits were taken from Titik Pilipino.

=== Production ===
- Dindo Aldaecoa - sound engineer
- Aperture 32, Inc. - album concept and design
- Jose Mari Chan - vocals, album producer
- Homer Flores - arranger
- Rey Magtoto - arranger
- Eddie Munji - arranger
- Emy Munji - arranger
- Willy Munji - MIDI programming
- Willy Munji - sound engineer
- Alvin Nunez - arranger
- Louie Ocampo - arranger
- Jun Orenza - sound engineer
- Voltaire Orpiano - sound engineer
- Monching Payumo - sound engineer
- Marvin Querido - arranger
- Ruben Remperas - sound engineer
- Jun Reyes - sound engineer
- Teddy Tan - photography

=== Recording locations ===
- Ad & Ad Recording Studio
- Audio Captain Recording Studio
- Greenhills Sound
- Cinema Audio, Inc.
- JR Music Recording Studios

== Certifications ==
Country	Provider	Certification	Sales
Philippines	PARI	20× Platinum (2× Diamond)	800,000+

== See also ==
- List of best-selling albums in the Philippines
