= December (1988 film) =

- Release date: 1988
- Country: India
- Language: Malayalam

December is a Malayalam-language film. It was released in 1988.
