= Dice and K9 =

Filipino hip hop duo from Cebu

Dice and K-9
- Origin: Cebu City, Philippines
- Genres: Hip hop; Pinoy hip hop
- Years active: 2002–present
- Labels: 6000 Goonz; Warner Music Philippines; Viva Records
- Members: Wolfren Rosaroso (DiCE); Miguel Calina (K-9)

Dice and K9 (also written as DiCE & K-9) are a Filipino hip hop duo from Cebu City. The duo is composed of Wolfren Rosaroso (DiCE) and Miguel Calina (K-9). They became known for their 2004 single "Itsumo" with Honey Rosaroso (Hi-C), which first gained popularity in Cebu before receiving airplay in Manila.

== History ==
=== 2002–2004: Early career and Breakthrough with "Itsumo" ===
Before working as a duo, Dice and K9 were active in Cebu's hip hop scene in 2002. Dice recorded music under his independent label 6000 Goonz. He later worked with K9 on the track "Bounce" (2003), which became a local hit in Cebu. After its success, K9 became part of Dice and K9, and two more members, Hi-C and Trapp, joined the group.

They were later brought to Manila and signed by Warner Music Philippines.

In 2004, the group released a song "Itsumo" from the album MOBBSTARR. The song included Japanese lyrics sung by Hi-C. Many listeners first thought the track was from Japan because of the chorus. According to later reports, "Itsumo" was originally recorded as a filler track after they were unable to clear a Tracy Chapman sample for another song. The word "Itsumo" is Japanese and means "always", "usually", or "habitually".

"Itsumo" became popular in Cebu after receiving heavy radio requests. It later gained airplay in Manila and became a nationwide hit. The music video aired on MYX and MTV Philippines. The song received nominations from local hip hop award groups and was listed in MTV-related coverage in the mid-2000s.

=== 2005–2010: Tha' Journey, Time Space Rhythm Starrs and Mobbstarr ===
In 2005, the group was nominated for Favorite Artist (Philippines) at the MTV Asia Awards. After the success of "Itsumo", the group continued releasing music including the album Tha' Journey in 2006.

In 2008, they released the album Time Space Rhythm Starrs, which followed their earlier full-length album Mobb Music.

In 2010, During their time as Mobbstarr, the group received recognition alongside other Cebu-based musical groups. Dice and K9, under the Mobbstarr name, together with the University of the Visayas Chorale and the Mandaue Children's Choir, were recognized for their contributions to music as an art form. Dice, Hi-C, and later member Klumcee also tied with a group from Thailand as Best Hip-hop Group in Southeast Asia at the Asia Voice Independent Music Awards. The award was given to independent artists who were not signed to major labels, and they were selected from more than 30 competing groups. In the same year, Mobbstarr received the National Commission for Culture and the Arts' Ani ng Dangal award for representing Filipino music internationally.

=== 2024–present: 20th anniversary reunion ===
In 2024, Dice and K9 reunited to mark the 20th anniversary of "Itsumo". They released a new single titled "In Your Head". In interviews, they spoke about their early struggles in Cebu's hip hop movement and their view that they helped bring attention to Cebu rap during a time when local hip hop received little mainstream support.

They also released a 20th anniversary music video for "Itsumo", filmed in Japan.

== Members ==
Dice and K9 are the core duo. Hi-C, Trapp, Klumcee, GARViE and Pain were part of the expanded Mobbstarr lineup at different points.

Core members

- DiCE (Wolfren Rosaroso) – rap vocals
- K-9 (Miguel Calina) – rap vocals, producer

Mobbstarr group members (expanded lineup)

- Hi-C (Honeyleen Concepcion Rosaroso) – vocals
- Trapp (Ivan Maningo) – rap vocals
- Klumcee – rap vocals
- GARViE – rap vocals

Former members

- Pain (Kris Villarino) – rap vocals

== Discography ==
=== Studio albums ===
- Mobb Music (2003)
- MOBBSTARR (2004)
- Tha' Journey (2006)
- Time Space Rhythm Starrs (2008)

=== Selected singles ===
- "Bounce" (2003)
- "Itsumo" (2004)
- "In Your Head" (2024)

== Awards and nominations ==
Award	Year	Category	Recipient(s)	Result	Ref.
Song of the Year (Davao and Cebu)	2003	Song of the Year	"Bounce"	Won	
1st Annual Hip-Hop Awards	2005	Best Rap Group	Dice and K9	Won	
MTV Video Music Awards (Philippines)	2005	Favorite Song	"Itsumo"	Nominated	
MTV Asia Awards (Philippines)	2005	Favorite Artist	Dice and K9	Nominated	
2nd Annual Hip-Hop Awards	2006	Best Rap Group	Dice and K9	Won	
Awit Awards	2006	Best Rap Song	"6 In Tha Mornin"	Won	
3rd Annual Hip-Hop Awards	2007	Best Rap Group	Dice and K9	Won	
Asia Voice Independence Music Awards	2009	Best Hip Hop Group	Dice and K9: MOBBSTARR	Won	
