= I Don't Want to Be Your Friend =

1989 song by Cyndi Lauper

"I Don't Want to Be Your Friend" is a pop/R&B song written and composed by Diane Warren. It was first recorded by singer Cyndi Lauper for her 1989 album A Night To Remember. The song talks about a woman who was left and hurt by her past lover. She admits being uncool with what happened to their relationship, expressing that "she doesn't want to be his friend". It was meant to be the second commercial single released in the U.S. from that album, but after the second radio single "A Night to Remember" failed to chart highly, the label scrapped the idea. Famed songwriter Desmond Child also recorded a version for his only album Discipline (1991). "I Don't Want to Be Your Friend" was eventually a single by Filipino singer Nina, and also recorded by Dutch female singer Do in her eponymous debut album.

== Nina version ==
"I Don't Want to Be Your Friend"

Single by Nina

from the album Diane Warren Presents Love Songs, Nina Live! & Nina Sings the Hits of Diane Warren
- Released: November 2004; February 23, 2005 (Nina Live! bonus track)
- Recorded: 2004
- Genre: Pop; R&B
- Length: 4:03
- Label: Warner Music
- Songwriter(s): Diane Warren
- Producer(s): Neil C. Gregorio

Nina singles chronology
"Sayang Naman" (2004)	"I Don't Want to Be Your Friend" (2004)	"The Christmas Song" (2004)

"I Don't Want to Be Your Friend" was covered by Filipino singer Nina as a single from Diane Warren's 2004 love songs compilation, Diane Warren Presents Love Songs. The song was produced by Neil C. Gregorio, and published by Warner Music Philippines. It was included as a bonus track on Nina's best-selling 2005 album Nina Live!, and has since been considered as a single from that album. It later appeared on her 2008 album, Nina Sings the Hits of Diane Warren.

Upon release, the song was met with positive reviews, being included by music critics as one of the favorite tracks in Nina's albums. Titik Pilipino complimented the simplicity of the song, saying "it's one song where [Nina] didn't have to shout and be a vocal Chinese acrobat." The song was nominated for Favorite Female Video on the 2005 MTV Pilipinas Music Awards, but lost the award to Rachelle Ann Go's "Love of My Life". On January 15, 2007, the song was released to digital download via iTunes and Amazon.com.

=== Background and release ===
"I Don't Want to Be Your Friend" was initially released by Nina in November 2004 under Warner Music for the promotion of Diane Warren's compilation Diane Warren Presents Love Songs. The song was released together with her rendition of "The Christmas Song" for the label's All Star Christmas Collection album, and became very popular in the Philippines. The song has since been considered as a Nina Live! single after it was included in the album's track list.

=== Critical reception ===
The song was well received by critics, becoming one of the most favorite Nina hits. It was also often confused to be a Nina original, since she was the one who popularized the song. Ginnie Faustino-Galgana of Titik Pilipino picked the song as one of her favorites on Nina Live! together with "Steep" and "Love Moves in Mysterious Ways". Another Titik Pilipino review by Resty Odon praised the song, saying "What I positively enjoyed, though, is 'I Don't Want to Be Your Friend'. I think Nina should study with intent the reasons why this song clicked with her and with almost everyone. Clue: It's one song where she didn't have to shout and be a vocal Chinese acrobat."

=== Music video ===
A music video accompanied the release of the song. The video was directed by Chi de Jesus. It was shot at a beach called Puerto del Sol in Pangasinan. The video features the sexy side of Nina, wearing bikini and portraying a model with a complicated relationship with the shoot photographer.

Titik Pilpino stated "Those who saw Nina's sexy video for 'I Don't Want to Be Your Friend' may be a bit shocked at the songstress' transformation, but Nina's clearly not afraid to express herself, be it in her videos or her music. In fact, it was Nina who revived the whole video trend by the end of 2002." The video was nominated for Favorite Female Video on the 2005 MTV Pilipinas Music Awards, but Nina lost the award to Rachelle Ann Go's "Love of My Life".

=== Official versions ===
Version	Length	Album
Album version	4:03	Diane Warren Presents Love Songs, Nina Live!, Nina Sings the Hits of Diane Warren
1800BYEMYLUV Remix	5:53	Nina in the Mix: The Dense Modesto Remixes
