= A Girl Can Dream =

Single by Nina

from the album Smile
- Released: 2004
- Genre: Pop; R&B
- Label: Warner Music
- Songwriter(s): Jimmy Santis, Nina Ossoff, Steve Skinner
- Producer(s): Neil Gregorio & Ferdie Marquez

Nina singles chronology
"Make You Mine" (2003)	"A Girl Can Dream" (2004)	"Sayang Naman" (2004)

Audio sample
- file; help

"A Girl Can Dream" is a pop ballad written by Jimmy Santis, Nina Ossoff and Steve Skinner and produced by Neil Gregorio and Ferdie Marquez for Nina's second album, Smile (2003). It was released as the album's second single in the first quarter of 2004 in the Philippines.

Although Nina popularized the song, Filipina singer Cris Villonco originally recorded it in 2000 for her album which was also entitled A Girl Can Dream. Florida-based girl group PYT released their version of the song for their 2001 album PYT (Down with Me).

== Release ==
The song is reminiscent of Nina's first hit "Jealous" according to many fans and critics. Though it again talks about a love triangle, it brings forth a more optimistic view in love.

== Video ==
Nina in a class room, fantasizing, while singing on the music video.

Nina dreams about a man in the video, as portrayed by then-newcomer Christian Bautista. She dreams of becoming madly in love with him as she sees him with another girl. In the end, Nina performs live and Christian invites her out.
