= December Avenue =

December Avenue may refer to:

- December Avenue (band), a Filipino pop-rock band
  - December Avenue (December Avenue album), 2016
- December Avenue (Tomasz Stańko album), 2017
