= Diane Warren =

American songwriter (born 1956)

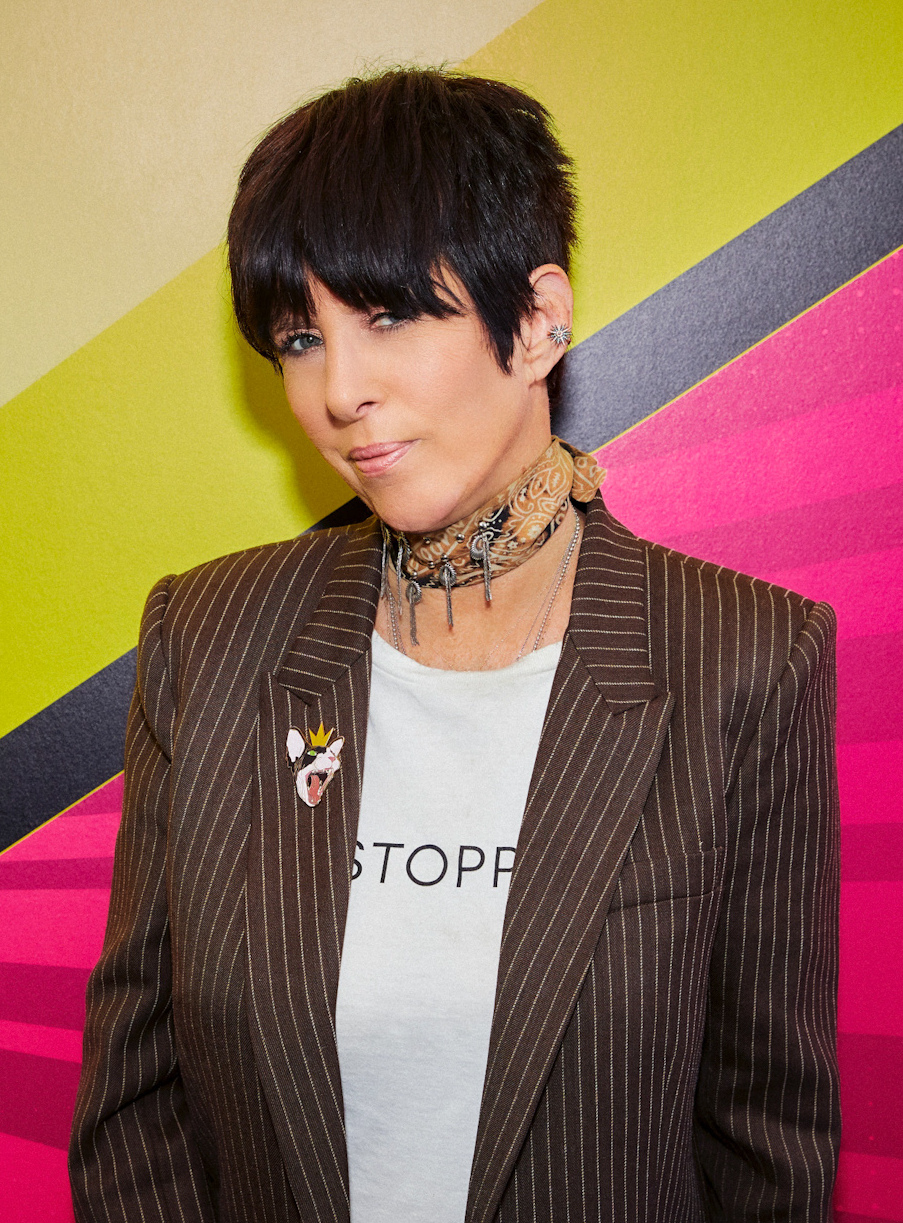
- Warren in 2022

Background information
- Born: September 7, 1956 (age 70); Van Nuys, Los Angeles, California, U.S.
- Genres: Pop; rock; R&B; soul
- Occupations: Songwriter; publisher
- Years active: 1983–present

Diane Eve Warren (born September 7, 1956) is an American songwriter. She has won an Academy Honorary Award, a Grammy Award, an Emmy Award, two Golden Globe Awards, and three consecutive Billboard Music Awards for Songwriter of the Year from 1997 to 1999. She first gained recognition for her work on DeBarge's 1985 single "Rhythm of the Night". By the late 1980s, she joined the record label EMI, where she became the first songwriter in the history of Billboard magazine to have written seven hit songs, each recorded by different artists, on the charts at the same time, prompting EMI's UK Chairman Peter Reichardt to call her "the most important songwriter in the world". Warren has received 17 nominations for Academy Awards, the most of any individual without a win. She received an honorary Oscar at the Governors Awards in November 2022.

Warren has written nine number-one songs and 33 top-10 songs on the Billboard Hot 100 including "If I Could Turn Back Time" (Cher, 1989), "Look Away" (Chicago, 1988), "Because You Loved Me" (Celine Dion, 1996), "How Do I Live" (LeAnn Rimes, 1997), "When I See You Smile" (Bad English, 1989), and "I Don't Want to Miss a Thing" (Aerosmith, 1998). She has been inducted into the Songwriters Hall of Fame and received a star on the Hollywood Walk of Fame. She has been rated the third most successful female artist in the UK, leading her to win the Ivor Novello Award and Special International Award in 2008.

Warren founded the publishing company Realsongs, through which she holds the masters of her work. Her debut studio album was released on August 27, 2021.

== Early life ==
Warren, the youngest of three daughters, was born to David, an insurance salesman, and Flora Warren (née Bressler), in the Los Angeles community of Van Nuys, where she said she felt misunderstood and "alienated" as a child growing up. Her family's surname "Warren" was originally "Wolfberg", but her father changed the name because he wanted it to sound less Jewish. Warren says she was rebellious as a child and told NPR's Scott Simon that she got into trouble and ran away as a teen but returned because she missed her cat.

As a child, Warren loved listening to music and dreamed of performing on the radio herself. She was also influenced by music her parents and her sisters would play. She began writing music when she was 11 but took a more serious approach at 14, commenting "music saved me." Warren has said that her mother asked her to give up her dream of a songwriting career and take a secretarial job. Her father continued to believe in her and encouraged her. In addition, he bought her a 12-string guitar and a metal shed for her to practice and took her to music auditions. She wrote Celine Dion's 1996 song "Because You Loved Me" as a tribute to her father for his encouragement.

She attended Los Angeles Pierce College and graduated from California State University, Northridge in 1978, but largely considered her education a waste as she focused most of her time on improving her songwriting skills instead of on her education.

On the February 12, 2016, edition of All Things Considered, Warren said that she had been molested at age 12 and had later experienced sexual harassment and assault by a sound engineer during her working career.

== Career ==
Warren's first hit was "Solitaire", which Laura Branigan took to No. 7 in the US pop charts in 1983.

She's actually more like the Emily Dickinson of Pop. As in the case of the great nineteenth-century reclusive New England poet known for her simple yet eloquent verses, Warren leads a life focused almost entirely on her art.

— Alanna Nash, Good Housekeeping, 1998

The original name for her publishing company, Realsongs, was "Warren Piece" because "War and Peace" was already taken. In 1998, Realsongs and its international partner, EMI Music Publishing, distributed A Passion For Music, a six-CD box set showcasing her music. EMI Music's London office assisted in distributing 1,200 copies of the box set primarily to the film and television industry for consideration in soundtracks and other commercial endeavors. It was not marketed to consumers. As of 2011, Warren's music has appeared in the soundtracks of over sixty films. She was awarded a star on the Hollywood Walk of Fame in 2001.

The Diane Warren Foundation, in conjunction with the ASCAP Foundation and the VH1 Save the Music Foundation created a joint initiative, beginning in 2000, called Music in the Schools. The initiative provides sheet music, band arrangements, folios, and method books to each of the schools that are already recipients of musical instruments from the VH1 Save the Music Foundation.

In 2004, Warren released a compilation album of love songs, Diane Warren Presents Love Songs, which includes several of her hits.

Warren wrote three songs for Carrie Underwood's debut album, Some Hearts (2005) that were "Lessons Learned", "Whenever You Remember" and the title track, originally written for Marshall Crenshaw.

In 2009, Warren co-wrote the United Kingdom's entry in the Eurovision Song Contest with Andrew Lloyd Webber. The song "It's My Time" was sung by Jade Ewen and achieved fifth place, the best for the UK since 2002.

In 2010, Warren partnered with Avon Products as a celebrity judge for Avon Voices, Avon's global online singing talent search for women and songwriting competition for men and women. For the contest, Warren wrote a special anthem which was recorded by the finalists and produced by Humberto Gatica. Warren has been recognized six times as ASCAP Songwriter of the Year and four times as Billboard's Songwriter of the Year.

In 2012, Warren wrote the song "Counterfeit" for Tulisa's debut solo album The Female Boss.

Warren wrote Paloma Faith's 2014 song "Only Love Can Hurt Like This".

Warren's success in the US has been paralleled in the UK, where she has been rated the third most successful female artist. Peter Reichardt, former chairman of EMI Music Publishing UK, credited her as "the most important songwriter in the world."

Warren is the first songwriter in the history of Billboard magazine to have seven hits, all by different artists, on the singles chart at the same time. Warren has had nine of her compositions hit No. 1 in the US Billboard Hot 100, all by different artists, and overall 33 of her songs have hit the US top ten. Additionally, two of the top 13 hits in the Hot 100's 57-year history were written by her - "How Do I Live" (number four) and "Un-Break My Heart" (number 13). She has had even more success on the US Adult Contemporary charts, where sixteen of her songs have gone to No. 1, and overall more than 40 songs have hit the top ten on that chart. Warren has had three No. 1 hits in the UK and more than 20 top ten hits. She has been inducted into the Songwriters Hall of Fame and received a star on the Hollywood Walk of Fame.

Warren's debut studio album, Diane Warren: The Cave Sessions Vol. 1, was released on August 27, 2021, via Di-Namic Records and BMG. Its first single, "Times like This" with Darius Rucker, was released on November 10, 2020. The second single, "She's Fire" with G-Eazy and Carlos Santana, was released on July 13, 2021. The single "Seaside" with Rita Ora, Sofía Reyes, and Reik was released on the same day as the album.

In October 2023, "Say Don't Go", a song Warren wrote with singer-songwriter Taylor Swift in 2013, was released as part of Swift's album 1989 (Taylor's Version). Debuting at number 5, the song marked the first time a song written by Warren hit the top ten of the US Hot 100 in 22 years.

The soundtrack single "Gonna Be You" from the film 80 for Brady was released January 20, 2023. The song was written by her and performed by Dolly Parton, Belinda Carlisle, Cyndi Lauper, Debbie Harry, and Gloria Estefan. The official music video shows Parton, Carlisle, Lauper, and Estefan performing while wearing football jerseys similar to the ones worn by the women in the film, interspersed with clips from the film.

== Personal life ==
Warren has never married, and does not think of herself as a person of commitment. In interviews, she has said that she believes that her lack of a romantic life makes her more peculiar as a songwriter. She was in a relationship with songwriter and record producer Guy Roche that ended in 1992 and claims she has not had another relationship since, commenting "I've never been in love like in my songs. I'm not like normal people. I'm no good at relationships. I draw drama to me—it's the Jew in me". Warren considers herself to be cynical regarding romance, but she does not let this affect her songwriting and prefers to write alone rather than co-writing, commenting "When I write with other people, the experience is different. You have to compromise, which I have problems with. I'd rather listen to my own mind."

In a 2000 interview, Warren explained that she never let go of music despite experiencing rejections, depression and poverty. In 1994, Warren's house was damaged by the Northridge earthquake, causing her to be miserable and homeless, drifting from hotels to rental houses. She lost another home in 2025 when it burned down during the Southern California wildfires. She has said that therapy helped her with songwriting. She has also revealed that she works 12–16 hours a day, always takes her keyboard whenever she travels and is "...more crazy and intense than I was at 20..."

Warren has been committed to animal welfare and plant-based living for decades. She was a vegetarian for 25 years and later adopted a largely vegan diet, citing ethical concerns about eating animals. She keeps numerous rescued animals at her Malibu ranch, including goats, pigs, donkeys, horses, and chickens, and is active in animal rescue and advocacy efforts. In 2021, she arranged for an escaped cow to be transferred to Farm Sanctuary, a nonprofit animal protection organization in Acton, California.

Warren does not usually allow anyone into her Hollywood Hills office, which she describes as a "cluttered, airless room." In 2012, Warren said that nothing in her office had been cleaned or moved for 17 years because she is superstitious; she prefers to think of that room as her "secret world." In that room, Warren records melodies with a tape recorder on which she plays them again and chooses the songs she likes the most. Warren did allow part of a 2016 interview with CBS News Sunday Morning correspondent Ben Tracy to be taped in the office.

Warren said she is autistic and believes being neurodivergent has made her a better songwriter.

== Legacy ==
A jukebox musical is planned to be written by Joe DiPietro and directed by Kathleen Marshall, titled Obsessed, The Story of Diane Warren...so far. Warren has composed nine No. 1 and 33 top-10 hits on the Billboard Hot 100 chart in a career spanning 40 years.

The documentary film Diane Warren: Relentless covered Warren's childhood and career. Her original song for the film, "Dear Me", was nominated for an Oscar in 2026.

== Discography (as artist) ==
=== Studio albums ===
Title	Details
Diane Warren: The Cave Sessions Vol. 1	Released: August 27, 2021; Label: BMG; Format: CD, digital download, streaming

=== Compilation albums ===
Title	Details
Diane Warren Presents Love Songs	Released: 2004; Label: Warner Strategic Marketing; Format: CD

=== Singles ===
List of singles, showing year released
Title	Year	Album
"(We All Are) Looking for Home" (with Leona Lewis)	2016	Non-album single
"Times like This" (with Darius Rucker)	2020	Diane Warren: The Cave Sessions Vol. 1
"She's Fire" (with G-Eazy and Carlos Santana)	2021	Diane Warren: The Cave Sessions Vol. 1
"Seaside" (with Rita Ora, Sofía Reyes, and Reik)	2021	Diane Warren: The Cave Sessions Vol. 1
"Sweet" (with Jon Batiste and Pentatonix)	2022	Diane Warren: The Cave Sessions Vol. 1
"Live on Love" (with Armin van Buuren featuring My Marianne)	2022	Feel Again, Pt. 2

=== US top-ten hits written by Diane Warren ===
(Top-ten entry date – Song – Artist)

[Bold denotes chart-topper.]

- May 14, 1983 – "Solitaire" – Laura Branigan
- Apr 06, 1985 – "Rhythm of the Night" – DeBarge
- Mar 14, 1987 – **"Nothing's Gonna Stop Us Now"** – Starship
- Oct 03, 1987 – "Who Will You Run To" – Heart
- Feb 27, 1988 – "I Get Weak" – Belinda Carlisle
- Aug 06, 1988 – "I Don't Wanna Live Without Your Love" – Chicago
- Nov 19, 1988 – **"Look Away"** – Chicago
- Sep 09, 1989 – "If I Could Turn Back Time" – Cher
- Oct 28, 1989 – **"When I See You Smile"** – Bad English
- Nov 11, 1989 – **"Blame It on the Rain"** – Milli Vanilli
- Dec 16, 1989 – "Just Like Jesse James" – Cher
- Mar 10, 1990 – **"Love Will Lead You Back"** – Taylor Dayne
- Apr 21, 1990 – "How Can We Be Lovers" – Michael Bolton
- Jun 23, 1990 – "I'll Be Your Shelter" – Taylor Dayne
- Jul 21, 1990 – "When I'm Back on My Feet Again" – Michael Bolton
- Sep 07, 1991 – "Time, Love and Tenderness" – Michael Bolton
- Nov 09, 1991 – "Set the Night to Music" – Roberta Flack with Maxi Priest
- Jun 06, 1992 – "If You Asked Me To" – Celine Dion
- Dec 26, 1992 – "Saving Forever for You" – Shanice
- Jul 03, 1993 – "I'll Never Get Over You (Getting Over Me)" – Exposé
- Jun 04, 1994 – "Don't Turn Around" – Ace of Base
- Mar 16, 1996 – **"Because You Loved Me"** – Celine Dion
- Nov 02, 1996 – **"Un-Break My Heart"** – Toni Braxton
- Mar 15, 1997 – "For You I Will" – Monica
- Aug 09, 1997 – "How Do I Live" – LeAnn Rimes
- Nov 08, 1997 – "The One I Gave My Heart To" – Aaliyah
- May 16, 1998 – "The Arms of the One Who Loves You" – Xscape
- Sep 05, 1998 – **"I Don't Want to Miss a Thing"** – Aerosmith
- Dec 12, 1998 – **"Have You Ever?"** – Brandy
- Oct 16, 1999 – "Music of My Heart" – Gloria Estefan and NSYNC
- Jul 01, 2000 – "I Turn to You" – Christina Aguilera
- Jun 30, 2001 – "There You'll Be" – Faith Hill
- Nov 11, 2023 – "Say Don't Go" – Taylor Swift

== See also ==
- List of American Grammy Award winners and nominees
- List of songs written by Diane Warren
- Because You Loved Me: The Songs of Diane Warren
- Nina Sings the Hits of Diane Warren
- When a Woman Loves
