= Diane Warren Presents Love Songs =

Compilation album by various artists
- Released: 1 November 2004
- Recorded: Various Times
- Genre: Pop
- Length: 77:31 (Philippines)

Diane Warren Presents Love Songs is a compilation album of love songs written by the American songwriter Diane Warren, released by herself in 2004 to 2006 in various countries. The track listing differs for Asian editions.

== Track listings ==
All songs written by Diane Warren.

=== US Edition ===
1. "I Don't Want to Miss a Thing" (Theme from Armageddon) – Aerosmith
2. "Because You Loved Me" (Theme from Up Close & Personal) – Celine Dion
3. "Can't Fight the Moonlight" (Theme from Coyote Ugly) – LeAnn Rimes
4. "I Turn to You" – Christina Aguilera
5. "How Do I Live" (Album version) (Theme from Con Air) – Trisha Yearwood
6. "Un-Break My Heart" – Toni Braxton
7. "From the Heart " (Theme from UK edition of Notting Hill) – Another Level
8. "I Learned from the Best" – Whitney Houston
9. "Saving Forever for You" – Shanice
10. "There You'll Be" (Theme from Pearl Harbor) – Faith Hill
11. "Have You Ever?" – Brandy
12. "If I Could Turn Back Time" – Cher
13. "When I See You Smile" – Bad English
14. "Look Away" – Chicago
15. "How Can We Be Lovers?" – Michael Bolton
16. "Love Will Lead You Back" – Taylor Dayne
17. "Set the Night to Music" – Roberta Flack and Maxi Priest
18. "I'll Never Get Over You Getting Over Me" – Exposé

=== Indonesian/Malaysian edition ===
1. "Because You Loved Me" (Theme from Up Close & Personal) – Celine Dion
2. "Can't Remember a Time – Krisdayanti
3. "I Learned From the Best" – Whitney Houston
4. "I Turn to You" – Christina Aguilera
5. "Un-Break My Heart" – Toni Braxton
6. "Love Will Lead You Back" – Taylor Dayne
7. "Saving Forever for You" – Shanice
8. "I Don't Want to Miss a Thing" (Theme from Armageddon) – Aerosmith
9. "Blue Eyes Blue" (Theme from Runaway Bride) – Eric Clapton
10. "When I See You Smile" – Bad English
11. "How Do I Live" (Album version) (Theme from Con Air) – Trisha Yearwood
12. "If I Could Turn Back Time" – Cher
13. "Can't Fight the Moonlight" (Theme from Coyote Ugly) – LeAnn Rimes
14. "There You'll Be" (Theme from Pearl Harbor) – Faith Hill
15. "How Can We Be Lovers?" – Michael Bolton
16. "Have You Ever?" – Brandy
17. "I'll Never Get Over You Getting Over Me" – Exposé
18. "Set the Night to Music" – Roberta Flack and Maxi Priest

=== Japanese Edition ===
1. "There You'll Be" (Theme from Pearl Harbor) – Faith Hill
2. "I Don't Want to Miss a Thing" (Theme from Armageddon) – Aerosmith
3. "Because You Loved Me" (Theme from Up Close & Personal) – Celine Dion
4. "Un-Break My Heart" – Toni Braxton
5. "Blue Eyes Blue" (Theme from Runaway Bride) – Eric Clapton
6. "Set the Night to Music" – Starship
7. "Can't Fight the Moonlight" (Theme from Coyote Ugly) – LeAnn Rimes
8. "Look Away" – Chicago
9. "When I See You Smile" – Bad English
10. "Love Will Lead You Back" – Taylor Dayne
11. "How Do I Live" (Album version) (Theme from Con Air) – Trisha Yearwood
12. "If I Could Turn Back Time" – Cher
13. "Time, Love and Tenderness" – Michael Bolton
14. "I Learned From the Best" – Whitney Houston
15. "I Turn to You" – Christina Aguilera
16. "Have You Ever?" – Brandy
17. "I'll Never Get Over You Getting Over Me" – Exposé
18. "Saving Forever for You" – Shanice

=== Philippines Edition ===
1. "I Don't Want To Be Your Friend" – Nina
2. "I Don't Want to Miss a Thing" (Theme from Armageddon) – Aerosmith
3. "Because You Loved Me" (Theme from Up Close & Personal) – Celine Dion
4. "Un-Break My Heart" – Toni Braxton
5. "I Turn to You" – Christina Aguilera
6. "How Do I Live" (Album version) (Theme from Con Air) – Trisha Yearwood
7. "There You'll Be" (Theme from Pearl Harbor) – Faith Hill
8. "Blue Eyes Blue" (Theme from Runaway Bride) – Eric Clapton
9. "Can't Fight the Moonlight" (Theme from Coyote Ugly) – LeAnn Rimes
10. "I Could Not Ask for More" – Edwin McCain
11. "When I See You Smile" – Bad English
12. "If I Could Turn Back Time" – Cher
13. "I Learned From the Best" – Whitney Houston
14. "Love Will Lead You Back" – Taylor Dayne
15. "I'll Never Get Over You Getting Over Me" – Exposé
16. "Have You Ever?" – Brandy
17. "Saving Forever for You" – Shanice
18. "How Can We Be Lovers?" – Michael Bolton

=== Taiwanese Edition ===
1. "Because You Loved Me" (Theme from Up Close & Personal) – Celine Dion
2. "Un-Break My Heart" – Toni Braxton
3. "I Don't Want to Miss a Thing" (Theme from Armageddon) – Aerosmith
4. "There You'll Be" (Theme from Pearl Harbor) – Faith Hill
5. "I Turn to You" – Christina Aguilera
6. "How Do I Live" (Album version) (Theme from Con Air) – Trisha Yearwood
7. "Blue Eyes Blue" (Theme from Runaway Bride) – Eric Clapton
8. "Can't Fight the Moonlight" (Theme from Coyote Ugly) – LeAnn Rimes
9. "From the Heart" (Theme from UK edition of Notting Hill) – Another Level
10. "I Learned From the Best" – Whitney Houston
11. "Love Will Lead You Back" – Taylor Dayne
12. "When I See You Smile" – Bad English
13. "If I Could Turn Back Time" – Cher
14. "Look Away" – Chicago
15. "I'll Never Get Over You Getting Over Me" – Exposé
16. "Set the Night to Music" – Roberta Flack and Maxi Priest
17. "Have You Ever?" – Brandy
18. "Saving Forever for You" – Shanice

== Charts ==
| Chart (2004) | Peak position |
|---|---|
| Malaysian International Albums (RIM) | 1 |
