= Believe in the Dream =

Single by Nina

from the album Stay Alive
- Released: April 24, 2012
- Recorded: 2011
- Genre: Pop, R&B, inspirational
- Length: 4:45
- Label: Universal
- Songwriter(s): Jude Gitamondoc
- Producer(s): Ito Rapadas

Nina singles chronology
"However Much Love" (2012)	"Believe in the Dream" (2012)	"Hanggang sa Dulo ng Walang Hanggan" (2012)

"Believe in the Dream" is a song by Filipina singer Nina from her 2011 studio album Stay Alive. It was released as a promotional single on April 24, 2012, and served as the third official single from the album. The song was written and composed by Jude Gitamondoc, and produced by Ito Rapadas under Universal Records. It is the second ballad song in the album, following the acoustic track "However Much Love." The song is an inspirational power ballad, and it shows off the singer's power vocals and belting range during the latter part of the song. The song talks about holding on to your dreams, and not letting anyone get on your way in achieving it.

"Believe in the Dream" was a critical acclaim, being given overwhelming positive reviews by OPM critics. PhilCharts.com called the song a "standout," commenting "shows her [Nina] impressive vocal range." The song was supposed to be released internationally, alongside the album but Universal canceled promotion for unknown reasons. Nina has performed the song live in Stay Alive's album launch and in her 2012 pre-Valentine concert at the Music Museum entitled Update Your Status...

== Background and release ==
In the last quarter of 2010, Nina revealed that she was recording an all-original studio album, stating "I only have two cover songs in there and the rest are originals. It's going to be sexy-soul which is like singing from the soul but when you hear it, there's a degree of sexiness to it. That's me 'eh. I'm really a singer that sings from the soul, bonus na lang 'yung sexy na part [the sexy part is just a bonus]." In her early years, Nina was an unsure aspiring artist who almost let go of her dreams. Due to this fact, she made certain to include an inspirational song encouraging her listeners to pursue their goals despite adversities. She further described the song in the following statement:

"I have a song there [in the album] that has a message about not giving up on your dreams. That's important for me because I, really, almost gave up [...] If this is what you always wanted to do, if this is your dream, don't lose hope. Go for it. Me, I almost gave up and if not for my faith and belief in God, I would have lost the hope that was left. So, just really keep on reaching for your dreams."

During the interview, Nina announced that the album will be released in mid-January 2011. However, it was pushed back to a February release. In the February 2011 issue of Woman Today magazine, she expressed postponing the album release, again, scheduling it in June 2011. In May 2011, Universal Records' head executive Kathleen Dy-Go stated that Nina has not yet finished recording the album, which may result the release date to be pushed back—for the third time—to July or August. Nina later confirmed that the upcoming album will finally be released in the last week of September 2011, that her main goal is to create a different kind of music for her fans and that she does not expect for it [the album] to be a huge hit. Despite the announcement, the album—which was later revealed to be entitled Stay Alive—was not released until November 19, 2011.

Prior to the release of Stay Alive, Universal Records' official YouTube channel posted a preview of the album on November 10, 2011, which only consists of the first nine tracks including a clip from "Believe in the Dream".

== Composition and critical reception ==
"Believe in the Dream"
A sample from the song, where Nina is said to "heighten the song’s emotion through the rawness that exudes from her vocals."

"Believe in the Dream" is an inspirational ballad song, that contains elements of rhythm and blues and soul. The song's structure is comparable to that of power ballads. It highlights Nina's vocal range, where she continuously belted out several notes from the bridge part until the song fades. Lyrically, the song talks about holding on to your dreams, and not letting anyone get in your way to achieving it. It also interprets faith in yourself and belief in God. The song was a critical acclaim, being called a "standout" by music critics. FORG of PhilCharts.com stated "The standout ballad in the album is the inspirational song “Believe in the Dream" where Nina not only shows her impressive vocal range but she also heightens the song's emotion through the rawness that exudes from her vocals. It's probably the song where Nina gave her all."

== Music video ==
"Believe in the Dream" was released on April 24, 2012 as the third single from Stay Alive, and was accompanied by an official lyric video posted by Universal Records' official YouTube channel on the same day. The video features screen captures of Nina's shots from the album booklet of Stay Alive, with each photo flashing alternately after another.

== Live performances ==
On January 29, 2012, Stay Alive Mall Tour had its first leg at Market! Market! Taguig, where Nina performed "Believe in the Dream" and most of the album songs with intensive choreography including "Dance", "Staying Alive" and "Only with You". On January 30, 2012, she sang "Believe in the Dream" in Hitachi Philippines' "Awakening" Distributorship Night at Century Seafood Restaurant. On the following night, she performed the same song for the Philippine Marketing Association anniversary. On February 5, 2012, she promoted the album at SM City Baguio as part of the mall tour, where she performed "Believe in the Dream" and other Stay Alive songs. She also sang her number-one hits "Love Moves in Mysterious Ways" and "Someday".

== Credits and personnel ==
Credits taken from Stay Alive's liner notes.

- Nina Girado – lead vocals, background vocals
- Jude Gitamondoc – songwriter, composer
- Ito Rapadas – producer
