= Stay Alive (Nina album) =

Studio album by Nina
- Released: November 19, 2011
- Recorded: August 2010 – August 2011
- Genre: Pop, R&B, electropop, dance
- Length: 50:28
- Language: English, Tagalog
- Label: Universal
- Producer: Kathleen Dy-Go (executive), Ito Rapadas, Jay R, Keith Martin, DJ High Rez, Arnie Mendaros, Paolo Zarate

Nina chronology
Diamond: Greatest Hits 2002-2010 (2010)	Stay Alive (2011)	All Good (2013)

Singles from Stay Alive
- 1. "Dance" Released: October 6, 2011; 2. "However Much Love" Released: January 30, 2012; 3. "Believe in the Dream" Released: April 24, 2012

Stay Alive is the sixth studio album by Filipina singer Nina, released in the Philippines on November 19, 2011 by Universal Records. After a long recording hiatus, Nina started working on a new album with her new label during the second half of 2010. She described the album's sound as "sexy-soul," and stated that they wanted to show the "other side" [the dancer] of her by means of a dance album. The album covers a wide range of genres, consisting of upbeat house, dance songs, but still possessing Nina's distinctive mellow sound. Aside from keeping a close watch to the production and song arrangement, the singer also contributed to the album art when she designed the packaging together with her brother King. She described the new look as "different, slightly futuristic and edgy."

The album had a star-studded production. In August 2011, it was revealed that American singer-songwriter Keith Martin and Filipino R&B musician Jay R worked together on the upbeat title track "Staying Alive". Jazz singer and Nina's co-Sessionista Richard Poon wrote the acoustic ballad "I Don't Want to Fight", while R&B singer Amber Davis wrote the electropop-dance cuts "Only with You" and "I Came to Dance". Nina also wrote a song for the album together with Martin. The song was entitled "You Should Know". As she made sure to include an inspirational song about "following your dreams," a Jude Gitamondoc-penned power ballad, later revealed to be entitled "Believe in the Dream", was included in the album's final track list.

Stay Alive was a universal acclaim, being well-received by critics and fans alike. The Philippine Star tagged Nina as the "new dance diva," and predicted that the album "may set new trends in Filipino music." Philippine Entertainment Portal praised both the singer and the album, saying that the album is "a testament to Nina's evolution as an artist" and "distinctly Nina." PhilCharts.com commented "quite a risky move, commercial wise, but the product is solid [...] The album shows the potential of Nina to grow more as an artist." Stay Alive is supposed to be the first of her two-album recording deal with Universal. However, in February 2012, Nina revealed that her contract with the label has already expired. She also expressed her disappointment regarding the album's promotion, and how the label took no action for it. The album was later released on digital download through iTunes and Amazon.com MP3 Download with a slightly altered cover.

The album was accompanied by three official singles. "Dance" was initially released in August 2011, but was immediately pulled out of the airwaves after the album's release date was pushed back. On October 6, 2011, the song was commercially released, and was later followed by a critically acclaimed music video. The video for "Dance" features Nina in Gaga-ish costumes, doing choreographed moves at the same time. She performed the song live in Happy Yipee Yehey! and Party Pilipinas, where she also launched the album. On January 30, 2012, "However Much Love" was released as the album's second single to boost up album sales. It also served as a radio-only Valentine single, since no video was recorded for the song. It became a commercial success, becoming Nina's first chart-topper since 2008. "Believe in the Dream" was released in April 2012 as the third official single from the album, accompanied by an official lyric video.

== Background and development ==
"I only have two cover songs in there and the rest are originals. It's going to be sexy-soul which is like singing from the soul but when you hear it, there's a degree of sexiness to it. That's me 'eh. I'm really a singer that sings from the soul, bonus na lang 'yung sexy na part [the sexy part is just a bonus]."

—Nina, on the album's different sound and content.

Before production for the album began, Nina was in a long recording hiatus. The last album that she recorded, Nina Sings the Hits of Diane Warren, was released in 2008. Her 2009 album Renditions of the Soul is only a collection of her performances on the Wave 89.1 radio show of the same title, and her 2010 album is only a compilation of her greatest hits. On August 7, 2010, she performed on Pilipinas Win na Win as a guest together with Erik Santos. During the show, she revealed that she was working on a new album, and added that it will be released early in 2011 due to heavy preparation. In November 2010 after her Think Pink concert at Cebu City, she openly talked about the album she was working on, and stated that her new sound is going to be "sexy-soul." She also shared ideas on the content of the album, and added that it will hopefully be released in mid-January. Before 2010 ended, her brother King revealed via Pinoy Exchange that Nina was planning to include Sabel's theme song "Hagkan" on the album as a bonus track. He also stated that Richard Poon wrote a song for the album entitled "I Don't Want to Fight". However, the album was pushed back to a February release. It was mid-February and there was still no update on the album's release. In an interview for the February 2011 issue of Woman Today magazine, Nina stated that the album's release was, again, pushed back to June 2011 due to the fact that she and her new label wanted the album to be perfect. On February 22, 2011, she posted on Twitter a photo of her, recording a new song in the studio. On February 28, she posted another photo in the studio with the tweet "getting ready for recording. :)...SO much love<3 [sic]."

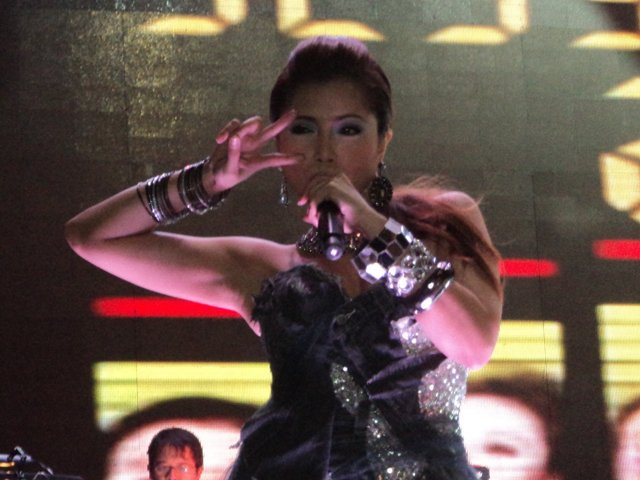
Nina was touring with the Sessionistas during production for the album.

In an interview after her arrival from Pattaya International Music Festival in Thailand, Nina mentioned working on her first album under Universal, stating "Expect few pleasant surprises from this new album of mine. We’re working very hard to make this project truly groundbreaking." On April 15, 2011, she wrote a Pattaya Music Fest article on The Philippine Star where she also talked about the album, saying "Late last year, I moved to my new record label Universal Records and I consider it one of the biggest blessings in my career. In a few months, my latest album will be released, and it will showcase a new, yet familiar Nina, which I hope everyone will appreciate." In May, the label's head Kathleen Dy-Go stated that Nina has not yet finished recording the album, which may result the release date to be pushed back to July or August. On May 31, Nina confirmed that "Hagkan" will be included in the album. On July 15, she confirmed that the album will be released by the end of month, and that they were just finishing up three songs. She further stated that her commitment to the album was the reason behind her constant absence in ASAP. On August 5, 2011, Jay R tweeted that he was working on a collaboration song between Nina and Jimmy Muna. On August 16, Nina tweeted her first publicized picture from the album's photo shoot. In September 2011, she confirmed that the album will finally be released by the last week of the month, proudly expressing the time and effort she exerted for it. She also stated that she did not pressure herself during its production, saying that her main goal is to create a different kind of music for her fans and that she does not expect for it to be a huge hit. Despite announcements, the album was not released until November 2011.

=== Title and cover art ===
Nina was very much involved in the whole process of producing the album that she had to give up several television appearances, which included dropping out of her ASAP group and segment entitled the Sessionistas. She explained "Umalis po ako sa ASAP dahil nagprepare po talaga ako sa album. At nasasabay sa mga out of town and out of the country na shows. [I dropped out of ASAP because I really prepared for the album. And I performed in out of town and out of the country shows.]" She kept a close watch from the album's conceptualization to its songs and arrangement, and even the paper dolls inside the album was her own idea. To be able to do all these things, she had to temporarily disappear in the scene for a while. Production for the album took nearly two years to finish, making people wonder if she had gone out of the music industry for good. In choosing a title for the album, Nina personally decided to call it Stay Alive—coming from the album's second track, "Staying Alive"—to remind the people that she is still very much around, in spite of the hiatus on TV, and the long break from the recording scene. She further explained the origin of the title:

"Kasi parang yung iba sinasabi na wala na (ako), pero hindi nila alam na gumagawa lang ako ng album. [Because it's like some people are saying that I'm gone, but they don't know that I'm just recording an album.] So I’m here to say that I’m still here and staying alive."

She finds the album "special," considering that she did not only contribute to its contents, but also worked on the album cover and packaging together with her brother King. She described the album's new look as "kakaiba, medyo [different, slightly] futuristic and edgy," and stated "I was really hands-on with it." She also personalized the album with striking images of her in chic and daring outfits, even adding a paper doll version of herself with cute paper clothing cut-outs. The album is presented in a shiny rectangular portrait digipak, containing a booklet, two "Nina Paper Doll" cut-outs and a minus one disc that is encased inside a white record sleeve (available exclusively at Odyssey)—all enclosed in a hard plastic case with white broken line prints, resembling Nina's image in the cover and appearing similar with the Statue of Liberty's superficial details.

== Departure from Warner ==
"Oh, I know the usual speculations like our business partnership turned sour, etc. But in our case, it’s just a matter of exploring or trying new things. I’ve no disagreement with them, whatsoever. I just wanted to move on!"

—Nina, on her separation with Warner Music.

Nina has been one of the highest-selling acts of Warner Music Philippines since she became part of the label in 2002, with her certified Diamond album Nina Live! (2005). In 2010, she was rumored to have switched to Universal Records. In February 2010, she collaborated with Universal's R&B singer Jay R on the song "Muli" for his album Jay R Sings OPM Love Classics. In May of the same year, she appeared on Kris Aquino's compilation, Blessings of Love, performing Michael Jackson's "You Are Not Alone" for the album. The album was also released by Universal. On June 30, 2010, she performed the song "Bagong Pilipinas", together with other Universal artists, in the inauguration of Philippine President Benigno Aquino III. It was evident that she has transferred from Warner to Universal, but there was still no confirmation until 2010 ended. On April 15, 2011, she confirmed transferring to Universal, when she wrote an article in The Philippine Star stating "Late last year, I moved to my new record label Universal Records and I consider it one of the biggest blessings in my career." In May 2011, she covered another song for Kris Aquino's album My Heart's Journey. It was "I Want to Know What Love Is", originally recorded by Foreigner. On July 15, 2011, she stated in an interview that she properly asked for permission when she left Warner. She further mentioned how the label took good care of her career, and that their separation ended in good terms. She also described Universal staffs' warm welcome as she transferred, saying "Actually, even though I was new to them, I didn't feel like a newcomer [...] They took care of me during the recording, and also during other shows by Universal."

== Composition and critical response ==
=== Style and structure ===
Stay Alive shows a different side of Nina, consisting mostly of original songs, and covers a wide range of genres from piano-driven ballads, midtempo pop blues, and house/synthpop to contemporary R&B. The album showcases her passion for dance music, relying on more upbeat, catchy tunes. Nina expressed that the album's direction to a new sound reflects to her new improved self, saying "I have changed a lot. From the time I came out with the Heaven album [..] I gained a lot of the confidence that I have now when I started gaining awards but not too much that it went to my head. It's confidence in my singing and performing and letting people know that I'm a singer." She stated that the album will be a studio album with two covers, and that its sound is going to be "sexy-soul," which she defined as "singing from the soul but having a degree of sexiness to it." Stay Alive is heavily considered as Nina's comeback in the recording scene, being described as a mixture of pop, club and R&B songs which is very different from her previous sound. She admitted the idea of wanting to try something new, saying "I want to try a different genre that’s why we decided to come up with a dance album," recalling her dance performances onstage during concerts and how it will be some sort of experiment for her. She also wants people to know that she loves to dance, and that she dares to show a more sexy, sensual side for the album. In preparation, she decided to maintain physical fitness by working out, playing tennis, and practicing boxing every day. She expressed hard work and exercise to improve her natural physique, proudly stating "I want to be a role model when it comes to body. As you can see, you don't need to be skinny to be sexy."

=== Music and lyrics ===
"Dance"
A 29-second sample of "Dance", featuring the aggressive uptempo arrangement that is completely different from Nina's previous releases.

"Believe in the Dream"
A sample from "Believe in the Dream", where Nina is said to "heighten the song’s emotion through the rawness that exudes from her vocals."

The album's lead single, "Dance", was written by Alexandra Prinz and Michael Gordon Lange, and is described as "an uptempo song with a catchy melody." Immediately after its release, the song was predicted by critics to set a new trend in Filipino music. Jojo Panaligan of Manila Bulletin recalled how Nina isn't new to the dance floor anymore, since her first two lead singles, "Heaven" and "Make You Mine", displayed the same groovy vibe. However, none of the two sounds as aggressive as "Dance" in terms of tempo and arrangement. Nina explained her thoughts on the simple reinvention, saying "Few know I love to dance and I’ve always wanted to show that side of me." Lyrically, the song talks about a woman who wants to get back together with her lover after breaking-up with him. While the verses describe her desire for the relationship, the chorus was written in an opposite manner, where she goes to the club and dances her way to forgetting her lover: "In the club I will raise my hands / I just wanna dance, dance, dance / On the thoughts of a new romance / I just wanna dance, dance, dance." According to FORG of PhilCharts.com, the song "has an irresistible beat that makes for a good club banger."

The following track, "Staying Alive", was written and produced by Jay R Sillona and Keith Martin under Sillona's own recording label, Homeworkz Records. The song uses Auto-Tune, and features rap verses by Q-York and additional back-up vocals by beauty queen Krista Kleiner, who was Sillona's partner at the time. It marked the second time that Nina collaborated with Sillona, since their duet of "Muli" in early 2010. The song is described as "another smoking track with bold and powerful lyrics: 'I shouldn't let them knock me down down down... I'm staying alive.'" "However Much Love" is an acoustic flute-driven song, considered as one of Nina's distinctly slow and sentimental ballads in the album. The lyrics speak of steadfast and unconditional love. Philippine Entertainment Portal called it a "standout," stating "Nina's voice heightens the pain and vulnerability evoked by the lyrics and melody." "Believe in the Dream" is an inspirational power ballad, written by Jude Gitamondoc. Nina insisted the song's inclusion with the purpose of encouraging her listeners to pursue their goals despite adversities. Its message is about not giving up on your dreams. Nina related the lyrics to her personal struggles, saying "That's important for me because I, really, almost gave up [...] If this is what you always wanted to do, if this is your dream, don't lose hope. Go for it. Me, I almost gave up and if not for my faith and belief in God, I would have lost the hope that was left. So, just really keep on reaching for your dreams."

"Stay Alive is a testament to Nina's evolution as an artist and determination to be a better performer [...] While the album attempts to prove the Soul Siren's versatility, Stay Alive is still distinctly Nina with her slow and sentimental ballads."

—A writer from Philippine Entertainment Portal, describing Nina's improvement in the album.

"Laging Ikaw" ["Always You"], the only original Tagalog song in the album, was written by Jose Villanueva III. The song is a midtempo pop blues containing elements of R&B, and has a bassline that is aligned with its electronic keyboard notes. It is described as "pop-ish." "Only with You" and "I Came to Dance" were written by Amber Davis and produced by DJ High Rez. Both songs feature "infectious and enticing party-house music." "I Don't Want to Fight" is an acoustic ballad, written by her close friend and ASAP Sessionistas group mate, Richard Poon. The song was originally recorded by Poon's band, U Turn, for their eponymous 2004 album. "Starlight" is a progressive ballad, originally recorded by Nora Aunor. "Missing You" was written by Arnie Mendaros, whom Nina has worked with in her debut album. "You Should Know" was co-written by Nina herself, together with Keith Martin, becoming the second song she ever wrote that was included in an album of hers—the other being "Can't Say I Love You" from Smile (2003). The song is described as "emphatic."

== Singles ==
"However Much Love"
A sample from "However Much Love". The song became Nina's first number-one single, since "I Don't Want to Miss a Thing" in 2008."

Prior to the release of Stay Alive, two different sample versions of the song "Dance" were released by Universal Records via YouTube. After a couple of days, the song received rotation over the radio, but was immediately pulled out due to cancellation of the album release. In October 2011, the song was officially released and started receiving limited airplay through radio stations. It was later revealed that Nina personally picked the song as the album's lead single, accepting the risk of catering a new different sound to listeners. "Dance" is an aggressive uptempo club, house dance song, described as an "upbeat track with a catchy melody." Two versions were shot as official music videos for the song, both directed by Sean Lim. The second version was released on December 9, 2011, and features Nina in Gaga-ish costumes. Knight of R&B Duncan Ramos made an appearance in the video, portraying her love interest in the club-dancing scenes. The song was given very limited commercial promotion, and its video was not played on myx until March 2012—which led Nina's fans to questioning Universal's marketing strategy. On January 30, 2012, Universal posted a sample version of "However Much Love", revealing it as the second single from the album. The song was set for a Valentine release as a radio-only single to boost up album sales. It was both critically and commercially acclaimed, being called a "standout" by Philippine Entertainment Portal and peaking at number one for three consecutive weeks, becoming Nina's first chart-topper since 2008's "I Don't Want to Miss a Thing". "Believe in the Dream" was released on April 24, 2012 as the third single from the album, accompanied by an official lyric video posted by the label on the same day. The song received overwhelming positive reviews by critics, but failed to chart due to loss of promotion.

Other notable songs

Nina posed on the front cover of Playboy Philippines magazine's May—June 2012 special issue, where she is seen nude with only her private body parts being covered. On May 29, 2012, Playboy Philippines' official YouTube channel released a music video for "Only with You", which consists of behind-the-scene footage for Nina's Playboy photo shoot. The video was produced in collaboration with Universal for the promotion of both the magazine and Stay Alive.

== Promotion ==
=== Release ===
Prior to the release of the album, a sample of the disco-influenced pop song by DJ Silverfilter entitled "Dance" was released on August 23, 2011 through Universal Records' official YouTube channel. Silverfilter revealed via Twitter that the voice behind the song is Nina's, and that it would be included in her album. He also stated that he was working on another material with Nina. The song was later released to radio, but was immediately pulled out of the airwaves due to the album release's cancellation. On October 6, 2011, a different sample version of "Dance", which does not feature Silverfilter, was posted by Universal. It was later revealed that Nina personally picked the song as the lead single for Stay Alive. On November 10, 2011, Universal Records' official YouTube channel posted a preview of the album which only included the first nine tracks.

=== Live performances ===
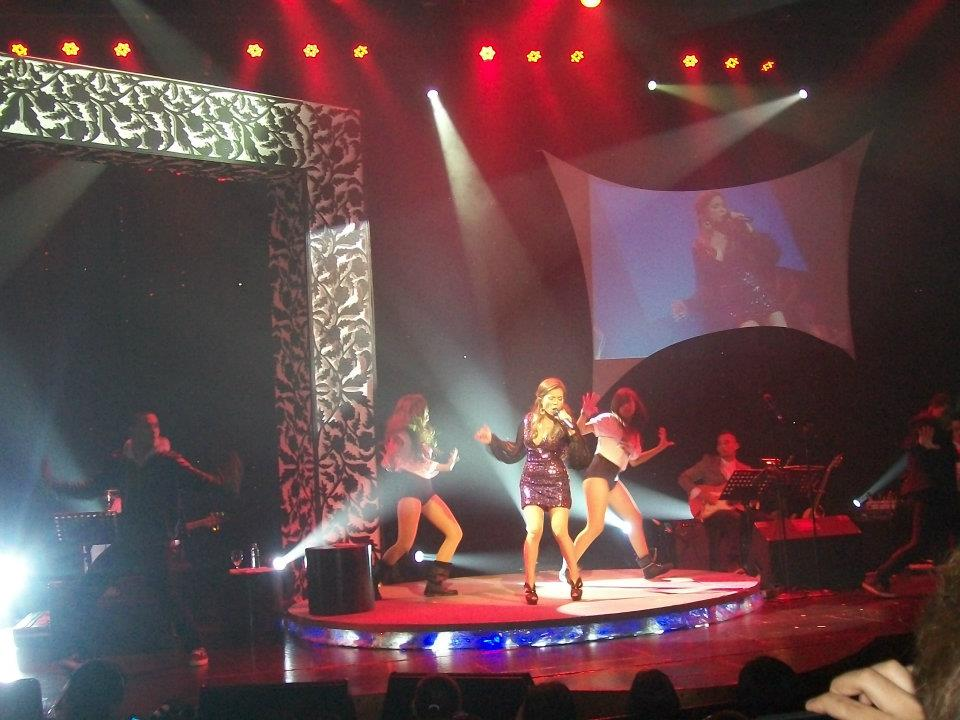
Nina performing "Staying Alive" on Update Your Status... at the Music Museum in February 2012.

On November 19, 2011, during the album's release date, Nina performed on a mini concert at TriNoma and had an album signing. Stay Alive was launched on November 22, 2011 at Patio Carlitos, White House, Quezon City. She sang three songs from the album including the lead single "Dance", which she performed with choreographed dance moves. She also performed the ballad "However Much Love", playing the keyboard in the beginning of the song. The other song she sang was her own composition, "You Should Know". She made a guest appearance in Gandang Gabi, Vice! with Richard Poon, where she promoted her album. The show aired on November 27, 2011. On December 1, 2011, she promoted the album on Happy Yipee Yehey! after performing the lead single "Dance" live. She also performed her 2004 holiday single "The Christmas Song" as a duet with Randy Santiago. Nina also made a guest appearance in Kris TV, promoting the album. The episode aired on December 7, 2011. On December 11, 2011, she launched the album in Party Pilipinas, the rival program of variety show ASAP which she became part of. She performed "Dance" with Frencheska Farr and Julie Anne San Jose. On the following day, she was interviewed by Boy Abunda as a special guest in his segment in Bandila called "Ikaw Na!." She also guested in Joe D' Mango's midnight radio show on DZMM entitled LoveNotes, where she sang a few songs from the album including "Hagkan", "Laging Ikaw" and "However Much Love". Also, the music video for "Dance" had its nationwide premiere during the show on December 13, 2011.

On January 29, 2012, Stay Alive Mall Tour had its first leg at Market! Market! Taguig, where Nina performed most of the album songs with intensive choreography including "Staying Alive" and "Only with You". On January 30, 2012, she sang "Believe in the Dream" in Hitachi Philippines' "Awakening" Distributorship Night at Century Seafood Restaurant. On the following night, she performed the same song for the Philippine Marketing Association anniversary. On February 5, 2012, Nina promoted the album at SM City Baguio, where she performed the album's songs and her previous hits, "Love Moves in Mysterious Ways" and "Someday". On February 13, 2012, she had her first major concert for the year entitled Update Your Status... at the Music Museum. The concert was staged in support with Stay Alive. The fan favorites—"However Much Love" and "Laging Ikaw", the ballads—"Believe in the Dream" and "You Should Know", and the dance songs—the title track and "I Came to Dance", were all included in the set list. As tribute to one of her musical influences, Whitney Houston who died two days before the concert, Nina performed Houston's hit single "Run to You".

== Awards ==
Stay Alive was nominated for Best Album Package in the 25th annual Awit Awards in 2012, but lost to Kinse Kalibre by Slapshock. In the 4th PMPC Star Awards for Music, Nina earned three nominations namely– Album of the Year for Stay Alive, Female Pop Artist of the Year, and Music Video of the Year for "Dance", but lost all three to– Araw Oras Tagpuan by Sponge Cola, Angeline Quinto, and "Where Do I Begin" by Gary Valenciano. She was also nominated for Best Female Style Icon on the 3rd Wave 89.1 Urban Music Awards.

== Track listing ==
No.	Title	Writer(s)	Producer(s)	Length
1.	"Dance"	Alexandra Prinz, Michael Gordon Lange	Ito Rapadas	3:40
2.	"Staying Alive" (featuring Q-York)	Jay R Sillona, Keith Martin, Dessirie Joy Hernandez-Poblete, Noel Zuñiga, Knowa Lazarus	Sillona, Martin	3:35
3.	"However Much Love"	Jude Gitamondoc	Rapadas	4:20
4.	"Believe in the Dream"	Gitamondoc	Rapadas	4:45
5.	"Laging Ikaw" (English: "Always You")	Jose Villanueva III	Rapadas	4:32
6.	"Only with You"	Amber Davis, Rapadas	DJ High Rez	3:42
7.	"I Came to Dance"	Davis	DJ High Rez	3:41
8.	"I Don't Want to Fight"	Richard Poon	Rapadas	3:59
9.	"Starlight"	Bodjie Dasig, Odette Quesada	Rapadas	5:09
10.	"Missing You"	Arnie Mendaros	Mendaros	4:37
11.	"You Should Know"	Martin, Nina Girado	Martin	4:51
12.	"Hagkan" (English: "Kiss")	Louie Ocampo, Winnie Arrieta	Paolo Zarate	3:33

Notes

- Track 8 was originally recorded by U Turn.
- Track 9 was originally recorded by Nora Aunor.
- Track 12 is a theme song from the TV series Sabel, and was originally recorded by Sharon Cuneta.
- A special edition of the album which includes a bonus disc, containing minus one versions of all the tracks, is available exclusively at Odyssey outlets.

== Release history ==
Country	Edition	Release date	Label	Catalogue
Philippines	Standard (CD)	November 19, 2011	Universal Records	CDP-94,1485
Philippines	Standard (download)	May 7, 2012	Universal Records	
United States	Standard (download)	May 7, 2012	Universal Records	B0087UVCIO
