= Dance (Nina Girado song) =

Song by Filipino singer Nina

Single by Nina

from the album Stay Alive
- Released: October 6, 2011
- Recorded: 2011
- Genre: Pop, electropop, house, dance
- Length: 3:40
- Label: Universal
- Songwriter(s): Alexandra Prinz, Michael Gordon Lange
- Producer(s): Ito Rapadas

Nina singles chronology
"Love Will Lead You Back" (2010)	"Dance" (2011)	"However Much Love" (2012)

"Dance" is a song by Filipina singer Nina from her 2011 studio album Stay Alive. It was originally released in a different version on August 23, 2011, but was immediately pulled out of the radio after the album's release was postponed. In October 2011, the song was, again, released as Stay Alive 's official lead single under Universal Records and received limited airplay. The song was written by Alexandra Prinz and Michael Gordon Lange, and produced by Ito Rapadas. It talks about a woman who wants to get back with her lover after breaking-up with him. Missing her man, she goes to the club and dances her way to forgetting him and escaping loneliness.

The single was accompanied by two different official music videos, both directed by Sean Lim. Version 2 was released in December 2011, and features Nina in Gaga-ish costumes, doing choreographed dance moves at the same time. Her co-Sessionista Duncan Ramos made a guest appearance in the video. Nina portrays a detective and an alien at the same time in the video, where she investigates a crime scene regarding alien abduction, when she is later revealed as the suspect alien. Despite the fact that two videos were filmed for the song, the other version was never released. She has performed the song live in Happy Yipee Yehey! and Party Pilipinas, where she also launched Stay Alive.

"Dance" was well received by OPM critics, being given positive response by music reviewers. The Philippine Star described the song as an "upbeat track with a catchy melody," while Philippine Entertainment Portal called it a "fast track that fans will surely delight in." The song was given very limited commercial promotion, and its video was not played on myx until March 2012—which led Nina's fans to questioning Universal's marketing strategy. The song was supposed to be released internationally, alongside the album but Universal canceled promotion for unknown reasons.

== Background ==
In the last quarter of 2010, Nina revealed that she was recording an all-original studio album and announced that it will be released in mid-January 2011, stating "I only have two cover songs in there and the rest are originals. It's going to be sexy-soul which is like singing from the soul but when you hear it, there's a degree of sexiness to it. That's me 'eh. I'm really a singer that sings from the soul, bonus na lang 'yung sexy na part [the sexy part is just a bonus]." However, the album was pushed back to a February release. In the February 2011 issue of Woman Today magazine, she expressed postponing the album release, again, scheduling it in June 2011. In May 2011, Universal Records' head executive Kathleen Dy-Go stated that Nina has not yet finished recording the album, which may result the release date to be pushed back—for the third time—to July or August. Nina later confirmed that the upcoming album will finally be released in the last week of September 2011, that her main goal is to create a different kind of music for her fans and that she does not expect for it [the album] to be a huge hit. Despite the announcement, the album—which was later revealed to be entitled Stay Alive—was not released until November 19, 2011.

Prior to the release of the album, a sample of the disco-influenced pop song by DJ Silverfilter entitled "Dance" was released on August 23, 2011, through Universal Records' official YouTube channel. Silverfilter revealed via Twitter that the voice behind the song is Nina's, and that it would be included in her album. He also stated that he was working on another material with Nina. The song was later released to radio, but was immediately pulled out of the airwaves due to the album release's cancellation. On October 6, 2011, a different sample version of "Dance", which does not feature Silverfilter, was posted by Universal. It was later revealed that Nina personally picked the song as the lead single for Stay Alive. On November 10, 2011, Universal Records' official YouTube channel posted a preview of the album which only included the first nine tracks.

== Composition and critical reception ==
"Dance"
A sample from the song's first chorus, featuring the aggressive uptempo arrangement that is completely different from Nina's previous releases.

"Dance" is an uptempo pop dance song, that contains elements of club and house music. It is described as an "upbeat track with a catchy melody," and is called "futuristic and edgy" by critics who also predicted that it may set new trends in Filipino music, and also tagged her as the new "dance diva." The song tells the story of a woman who wants to get back together with her lover after breaking up with him. She suddenly misses her man very much, and gets emotionally undecided. She then goes to the club and dances her way to forgetting things and escaping loneliness. Nina further explained her thoughts on the song, saying "The carrier single is a dance song kasi para maiba naman [for it to be different] from my previous albums. Many people do not know that I love to dance, so I want to show it to them." Jojo Panaligan of Manila Bulletin recalled how Nina isn't new to the dance floor anymore, since her first two lead singles, "Heaven" and "Make You Mine", displayed the same groovy vibe. However, none of the two sounds as aggressive as "Dance" in terms of tempo and arrangement. In a review by FORG of PhilCharts.com, he commented "the lead single [Dance] has an irresistible beat that makes for a good club banger."

== Music videos ==
=== Development ===
Two versions were shot as official music videos for "Dance", both directed by Sean Lim. "Version 2" was shot by cinematographer Rain Yamson II, and had its final editing finished on November 18, 2011. The music video was released on December 9, 2011, and features Nina in Gaga-ish costumes. Knight of R&B Duncan Ramos made an appearance in the video, portraying her love interest in the club-dancing scenes. Nina expressed hard physically work to improve her figure, in preparation for both the video and the album, saying "I achieved this through religious workout. Add to that boxing and jogging. I’m really focused on keeping myself fit!" The music video had its nationwide premiere in Joe D' Mango's midnight TV/radio show on DZMM entitled LoveNotes, which aired on December 13, 2011. Despite the fact that two different music videos were recorded for the song, only one version was released.

=== Synopsis ===
Nina in Gaga-ish costumes and choreographed dance moves for the video.

The music video starts in a vintage concept, where Nina portrays a detective and is seen in a crime scene investigation, regarding a case of alien abduction, with two other male investigators. She wears white long-sleeved shirt, tight-fitted skirt and high heels. She starts talking to the man in black coat, while the other man in white shirt and black vest takes pictures of the evidence using a vintage camera. She then comes near to the physical evidence and touches the trail. A light wave hits her, and her arm starts to glow. The scene suddenly shifts to a space ship where Nina is seen standing and glowing white, with multiple metallic wings behind her. She wears a light-generating dress with glittering beads, and starts singing to the song. The scene shifts back to the crime investigation where she looks confused and light-headed, while everybody else is very busy with the forensic activity. She is later struck by a headache in a prison, where she slips backward to the bars and the prisoners inside begin to grab her. The scene changes to a club, where Nina is seen wearing orange outfit and dancing to the song. Scenes from the space ship alternatively enter into the chorus of the song.

Nina is then seen in a black bath tub, soaked into her tears while singing the lines: "I'm drowning in my tears, thinking 'bout where you've been." She wears a black dress, while the only background seen are the black-and-white checkered tiles. Scenes from the club suddenly pop-up, where Nina is seen dancing with her love interest (portrayed by Duncan Ramos). The space ship scenes still alternatively appear throughout the whole song. A ballroom scene later enters the video, where she is seen wearing a diamond glittering top and fitted jean shorts. She performs a Latin dance with her partner throughout the bridge of the song. The scene then shifts into club with the black-and-white checkered tile flooring, where she is seen performing to the song with back-up dancers behind her. She wears white top and black shorts. The club scenes and space ship scenes alternatively pop-up after one another then. The scene later shifts back to the part where Nina touched the evidence's trail, and her hand doesn't glow anymore.

=== Reception ===
The music video of "Dance" received overwhelming positive reviews, with most critics pointing out the modern and trendy concept of the video. Malaya called Nina the new "dance diva," and commented "the carrier single which has a video showing her doing a la Rihanna. Manila Standard Today stated "Its futuristic, edgy music video exhibits not only Nina's vocal prowess but terpsichorean skills as well." The Philippine Star described the video as "futuristic" and added that it may set new trends in Filipino music. Philippine Entertainment Portal complimented on her sexy figure, saying ""Dance" is a fast track that fans will surely delight in. Its music video features a sizzling Soul-Siren showing off her dance moves. The video also bares the artist's sexier bod—which she worked hard to achieve by taking intense dance classes, boxing, and tennis." Despite well reception, the video was not played on myx until March 2012.

== Live performances ==
Stay Alive was launched on November 22, 2011 at Patio Carlitos, White House, Quezon City. Nina sang three songs from the album including the lead single "Dance", which she performed with choreographed dance moves. She also performed the critically acclaimed ballad, "However Much Love", and her own composition, "You Should Know". On December 1, 2011, she promoted her album on Happy Yipee Yehey! after performing the song live, where she also did a duet with the show's host Randy Santiago. On December 11, 2011, she launched the album in Party Pilipinas, the rival program of variety show ASAP which she became part of. She performed "Dance" with Frencheska Farr and Julie Anne San Jose. She also guested in Joe D' Mango's midnight radio show on DZMM entitled LoveNotes, where she sang a few songs from the album including "Hagkan", "Laging Ikaw" and "However Much Love". Also, the music video for "Dance" had its nationwide premiere during the show. The episode aired on December 13, 2011. On New Year's Eve 2012, the song was played inside Big Brother's house on Pinoy Big Brother: Unlimited. On January 29, 2012, Stay Alive Mall Tour had its first leg at Market! Market! Taguig, where Nina performed most of the album songs with intensive choreography including "Dance", "Staying Alive" and "Only with You". On February 5, 2012, she promoted the album at SM City Baguio as part of the mall tour, where she performed "Dance" and other Stay Alive songs. She also sang her number-one hits "Love Moves in Mysterious Ways" and "Someday".

== Official versions ==
Version	Length	Album
Album version	3:40	Stay Alive
Video version	4:09	Non-album single
SF Mass Mix (featuring Silverfilter)	3:54	Non-album single

== Credits and personnel ==
Credits taken from Stay Alive's liner notes.

- Nina Girado – lead vocals, back-up vocals
- Michael Gordon Lange – songwriter, composer
- Alexandra Prinz – songwriter, composer
- Ito Rapadas – producer
