= However Much Love =

Audio songs album by Filipina singer Nina

Single by Nina

from the album Stay Alive
- Released: January 30, 2012
- Recorded: 2011
- Genre: Pop, R&B, acoustic
- Length: 4:20
- Label: Universal
- Songwriter(s): Jude Gitamondoc
- Producer(s): Ito Rapadas

Nina singles chronology
"Dance" (2011)	"However Much Love" (2012)	"Believe in the Dream" (2012)

"However Much Love" is a song by Filipina singer Nina from her 2011 studio album Stay Alive. It was released as a radio-only Valentine single on January 30, 2012, and served as the second single from the album. The song was written and composed by Jude Gitamondoc, and produced by Ito Rapadas under Universal Records. It is the first ballad song in the album, and has an arrangement reminiscent to Nina's 2006 number-one hit "Someday". The song talks about unconditional love, wherein the protagonist narrates her everlasting feelings for her lover despite his dishonesty and deception.

"However Much Love" was a critical acclaim, being given overwhelming positive reviews and even noted as the album's highlight by OPM critics. Philippine Entertainment Portal called the song a "standout." Commercially, the song was a moderate success, peaking at number-one for three consecutive weeks, also becoming Nina's first chart-topper since "I Don't Want to Miss a Thing" in 2008. The song was supposed to be released internationally, alongside the album but Universal canceled promotion for unknown reasons. It has been performed live by Nina in Stay Alive's album launch and in her 2012 pre-Valentine concert at the Music Museum entitled Update Your Status...

== Background and release ==
In the last quarter of 2010, Nina revealed that she was recording an all-original studio album and announced that it will be released in mid-January 2011, stating "I only have two cover songs in there and the rest are originals. It's going to be sexy-soul which is like singing from the soul but when you hear it, there's a degree of sexiness to it. That's me 'eh. I'm really a singer that sings from the soul, bonus na lang 'yung sexy na part [the sexy part is just a bonus]." However, the album was pushed back to a February release. In the February 2011 issue of Woman Today magazine, she expressed postponing the album release, again, scheduling it in June 2011. In May 2011, Universal Records' head executive Kathleen Dy-Go stated that Nina has not yet finished recording the album, which may result the release date to be pushed back—for the third time—to July or August. Nina later confirmed that the upcoming album will finally be released in the last week of September 2011, that her main goal is to create a different kind of music for her fans and that she does not expect for it [the album] to be a huge hit. Despite the announcement, the album—which was later revealed to be entitled Stay Alive—was not released until November 19, 2011.

Prior to the release of Stay Alive, Universal Records' official YouTube channel posted a preview of the album on November 10, 2011, which only included the first nine tracks. On January 30, 2012, Universal posted an audio clip of "However Much Love" on their YouTube account, revealing it as the album's second single, following "Dance".

== Composition and critical reception ==
"However Much Love"
A sample from the song's bridge part, where "Nina's voice heightens the pain and vulnerability evoked by the lyrics and melody."

"However Much Love" is an acoustic ballad song, that contains elements of rhythm and blues and soul. Its instrumental music consists of guitar strums and flute whistles. The song's arrangement is said to be reminiscent to Nina's 2006 number-one single "Someday". Lyrically, the song talks about unconditional love, wherein the protagonist narrates her everlasting feelings for her lover despite his dishonesty and deception. The song was a critical acclaim, being called a "standout" by music critics. Abby Mendoza of Philippine Entertainment Portal commented "As the song talks about steadfast and unconditional love, Nina's voice heightens the pain and vulnerability evoked by the lyrics and melody."

== Live performances ==
Stay Alive was launched on November 22, 2011 at Patio Carlitos, White House, Quezon City. Nina sang three songs from the album including the lead single "Dance", which she performed with choreographed dance moves. She also performed the critically acclaimed ballad, "However Much Love", and her own composition, "You Should Know". She also guested in Joe D' Mango's midnight radio show on DZMM entitled LoveNotes, where she sang a few songs from the album including "Hagkan", "Laging Ikaw" and "However Much Love". Also, the music video for "Dance" had its nationwide premiere during the show. The episode aired on December 13, 2011. On January 29, 2012, Stay Alive Mall Tour had its first leg at Market! Market! Taguig, where Nina performed "However Much Love" and most of the album songs with intensive choreography including "Dance", "Staying Alive" and "Only with You". On February 5, 2012, she promoted the album at SM City Baguio as part of the mall tour, where she performed "However Much Love" and other Stay Alive songs. She also sang her number-one hits "Love Moves in Mysterious Ways" and "Someday".

== Credits and personnel ==
Credits taken from Stay Alive's liner notes.

- Nina Girado – lead vocals
- Jude Gitamondoc – songwriter, composer
- Ito Rapadas – producer
