= All Good (album) =

Studio album by Nina
- Released: January 23, 2013
- Recorded: May—December 2012
- Studio: Philippines, California
- Genre: Pop, R&B, acoustic
- Length: 56:07
- Language: English, Filipino
- Label: Viva
- Producer: Vic del Rosario, Jr., Tony Ocampo, Vicente del Rosario, Civ Fontanilla, Christian de Walden, Vehnee A. Saturno

Nina chronology
Stay Alive (2011)	All Good (2013)

Singles from All Good
- 1. "Don't Say Goodbye" Released: October 9, 2012; 2. "Sa Isang Tingin" Released: February 23, 2013; 3. "When the Love Is Gone" Released: October 23, 2013

All Good is the seventh studio album by Filipina singer Nina, released in the Philippines on January 23, 2013 by Viva Records. The album release was accompanied by the singer's comeback major concert at the Music Museum entitled Nina Reborn. In May 2012, Nina announced her transfer to Viva right after the expiration of her contract with Universal where she released one album, Stay Alive, expressing her disappointment with the label for not promoting the album despite positive reception. She later revealed working on a studio album which will have original songs and some covers. All Good consists of songs that were written by famous OPM composer Vehnee Saturno, 2013 Himig Handog runner-up Marion Aunor, Filipino boyband XLR8-member MJ Magno, and American songwriter Lori Barth.

The album was a critical acclaim, being praised for Nina's more mature sound with less vocal acrobatics. Journal stated "All Good is a suite of beautiful songs" while The Philippine Star commented that the album's purpose is "to empower its belief that [Nina] has more to offer as a recording artist." Nina Reborn also received positive reviews along with the album. The album has five cover versions, including "Perfect," "Mahal na Mahal Kita," "Hurting Inside," "Pinilit Kong Limutin Ka" (the Tagalog version of "I Still Believe in Loving You"), and "Don't Say Goodbye"—all originally performed by True Faith, Archie D., Vanna Vanna, Sarah Geronimo and Pops Fernandez. "Pinilit Kong Limutin Ka" was described as a "potential lead single for the album" by critics.

Prior to the release of All Good, Nina recorded her version of "Don't Say Goodbye" as theme song for 2012 romantic drama film A Secret Affair, where she had a cameo appearance. The song earned her ECG Allhits.ph Most Downloaded Artist and Most Download Song for 2013 on the 27th Awit Awards. "Sa Isang Tingin" was released in February 2013 as the lead single for All Good. The song was described as a "safe choice for radio airplay." Despite being released commercially, no music video was recorded for the song. This led fans to questioning Viva's marketing strategy. "Hurting Inside" was released as a promotional single in March 2013, accompanied by a lyric video posted on Viva's official YouTube page. "When the Love Is Gone" was used a theme song for the film of the same name in October 2013. Despite being an official single, the song's music video only consisted of scenes from the movie without the appearance of Nina.

== Background and release ==
[Universal] always have a meeting, but no actions are initiated. They give us schedules that are not really followed. When it's already okay, then they cancel it.

— Nina, on her disappointment with Stay Alive's lack of promotion.

On May 8, 2012, Girado signed a five-year recording deal with Viva Records, following the expiration of her contract with Universal. In an interview, she stated that during her Love2Love2Love concert in 2010—which was produced by Viva Entertainment, the label's head Vicente Del Rosario, Jr. expressed interest in managing her career. However, she has already signed under Universal at that time. Shortly after her separation with the label, she reunited with Viva with the help of Geleen Eugenio. She expressed working on a new album, saying that it will have "the same Nina sound [...] New songs maybe, can be cover, can be original, but we’re eyeing on original songs." She announced that she will be having her acting debut with the label, stating "I'll be going to Singapore to do acting workshop. Because I myself, honestly, don't know much about acting. So if ever I will star in a movie, I'm not half-baked, I'll be prepared. And also for myself, I want to be prepared, especially if I'm heading straight into a new direction." In October 2012, she appeared in a cameo role for the film A Secret Affair, where she also performed the movie theme song "Don't Say Goodbye."

On January 25, 2013, she staged her comeback concert at the Music Museum entitled Nina Reborn, accompanied by the release of her first album under Viva. The concert was met with overwhelming positive reviews including the dance performances, with Manila Bulletin stating "the show is not just about a display of Nina's vocal prowess but it aims to highlight an overlooked facet of the R&B singer's skills." The Philippine Star commented "[Nina] is one of the very few female singers around who does not belt or scream out her songs. She very simply croons with soft birdlike tones [...] alternative to the usual vocal acrobatics of our pop divas."

== Critical reception ==
Professional ratings
Review scores
Source	Rating
Journal	(positive)
The Philippine Star	(positive)

All Good received favorable response from OPM critics, being described as Nina's "strongest album in years." Remy Umerez of Journal emphasized the singer's commercial charisma by saying that "[Nina] set the bar high for female singers of her generation with the multi-platinum success of her solo albums in the mid-2000s" and praised the album's sound, stating "A more mature Nina is what people will hear [...] All Good is a suite of beautiful songs." She complimented the original songs, including the Tagalog ballad "Paano" which she called "heart-tugging." Yugel Losorata of The Philippine Star shared the same opinion on Nina's commercial success, commenting "[Nina] has done her first all-OPM package for her new CD, reflecting her mindset of thanking back the local music scene that has provided her blessings other lady acts can only dream of." However, he criticized the first official single "Sa Isang Tingin", calling it a "safe choice for radio airplay" due to the song's "strong melody somewhat influenced by high-recall Tagalog songs of the yesteryears." Losorata praised the title track and "Pinilit Kong Limutin Ka", stating "the latter two have more melodic appeal than the first single."

=== Awards ===
In 2013, Nina received three nominations on the 5th PMPC Star Awards for Music namely– Album of the Year for All Good (which was lost to MKNM: Mga Kwento Ng Makata by Gloc-9), Female Recording Artist of the Year (which she lost to Sarah Geronimo), and Female Pop Artist of the Year (which she lost to Jessa Zaragoza). In 2014, she was nominated on the 27th Awit Awards for Best Performance by a Female Recording Artist for "Sa Isang Tingin". Despite losing the award to Zia Quizon's "Pasakalye," she was awarded as Entertainment Gateway Group (EGG) Allhits.ph’s Most Downloaded Artist and Most Downloaded Song for 2013 with "Don't Say Goodbye."

== Singles ==
"Don't Say Goodbye" was released on October 9, 2012 prior to the release of All Good as a promotional single for Viva's feature film A Secret Affair, which starred Anne Curtis and Derek Ramsay. The song was a Louie Ocampo-penned ballad, originally recorded by Pops Fernandez. It was co-written by Fernandez' ex-husband Martin Nievera. The song received positive feedback from both critics and listeners, causing it to gain radio airplay and later being used as a promo single for the album. Its music video was taken from a scene in the film, where Nina is seen performing in a bar's concert stage, with only a piano accompanying her voice. Throughout the video, scenes from the movie randomly appear. On February 23, 2013, "Sa Isang Tingin", an original love song written by MJ Magno of MMJ and XLR8, was released as the first commercial single for the album. Nina has performed the song in various concerts and television appearances. Despite being claimed as an official single, no music video was yet recorded for the song's promotion. On October 22, "When the Love Is Gone" was released as the third official single for the album, as soon as it was used as the official theme song for the 2013 romantic drama film of the same title. The song's music video only consisted of scenes from the movie and none showing Nina.

Other notable songs

"Hurting Inside" was released on March 3, 2013 as a promotional single for the album. The song was written by Jimmy Antiporda and originally recorded by 90's OPM girl group Vanna Vanna. It was accompanied by an official lyric video, which was published on Viva Records' official YouTube page during the song's release.

== Promotion ==
Nina performing on her Nina Reborn concert in January 2013.

All Good was launched on February 17, 2013 at TriNoma mall stage, where Nina performed songs from the album including "Sa Isang Tingin," the title track, "Paano," "Hurting Inside," and "Don't Say Goodbye". She also promoted the album in various mall venues across the Philippines. On March 5, 2013, just two days after "Hurting Inside" was released as a promo single, she embarked on an international tour in support of the album. The first leg of the tour was held at Asiana Hotel, Deira, Dubai. On March 24, she promoted the album in noontime variety show Party Pilipinas where she sang her number-one hits "Love Moves In Mysterious Ways" and "Foolish Heart" together with the show's male singers Kris Lawrence, Down to Mars, Rhythm n' Boys, Gian Magdangal and Jay R. Following the two hits, she performed lead single "Sa Isang Tingin" on the show. In July 2014, she performed "Paano" on GMA News TV entertainment show MARS.

=== Nina Reborn ===
All Good's release was accompanied by Nina's comeback major concert entitled Nina Reborn, held at Music Museum on January 25, 2013. The concert had its cable television premiere on May 4, 2013 at 9:30P.M. PST on Filipino cable channel PBO (Pinoy Box Office). Some of the songs she performed from the album included "Maybe It's Too Soon," "Sa Isang Tingin," "All Good," "When the Love Is Gone" and "Don't Say Goodbye." She also promoted the album in noontime variety game show Wowowillie, which she is one of the co-hosts, on February 2.

== Track listing ==
No.	Title	Writer(s)	Producer(s)	Length
1.	"Maybe It's Too Soon"	Vehnee A. Saturno, Marion Aunor	Saturno	3:39
2.	"Sa Isang Tingin" (English: "With One Look")	MJ Magno	Civ Fontanilla	4:10
3.	"Perfect"	Medwin Marfil	Fontanilla	5:02
4.	"Kung Walang Ikaw, Walang Ako" (English: "If There's No You, There'd Be No Me")	Elmer Blancaflor	Fontanilla	4:58
5.	"Mahal na Mahal Kita" (English: "I Love You So Much")	Archie Dairocas	Fontanilla	4:49
6.	"All Good"	Toto Sorioso	Fontanilla	4:10
7.	"Make It Up to You"	Jimmy Borja, Judy Klass	Christian de Walden	3:30
8.	"Sad"	Borja, Klass	de Walden	3:54
9.	"Paano" (English: "How")	Geraldine Lim	Fontanilla	4:16
10.	"When the Love Is Gone"	Lim	Fontanilla	4:20
11.	"Hurting Inside"	Jimmy Antiporda	Fontanilla	4:47
12.	"Pinilit Kong Limutin Ka"	Borja, Lori Barth, Ralf Stemmann	de Walden	4:22
13.	"Don't Say Goodbye" (bonus track)	Louie Ocampo, Martin Nievera	Fontanilla	4:27
Total length:				56:07

Notes

- Track 3 was originally recorded by True Faith.
- Track 5 was originally recorded by Archie D.
- Track 11 was originally recorded by Vanna Vanna.
- Track 12 is the Tagalog version of "I Still Believe in Loving You," originally recorded by Sarah Geronimo.
- Track 13 is a theme song from the 2012 film A Secret Affair, originally recorded by Pops Fernandez.

== Recording locations ==
- Vocals—Amerasian Studio (Philippines)
- Tracks—Kob/Flamingo Café Studio (Los Angeles, California)

== Release history ==
Country	Edition	Release date	Label	Catalogue
Philippines	Standard (CD + bonus track)	January 23, 2013	Viva Records	VR CDS 13 461
Philippines	Standard (Digital download)	January 28, 2013	Viva Records	
United States	Standard (Digital download)	January 28, 2013	Viva Records	
