= Nina Girado =

Filipino singer and record producer

Nina
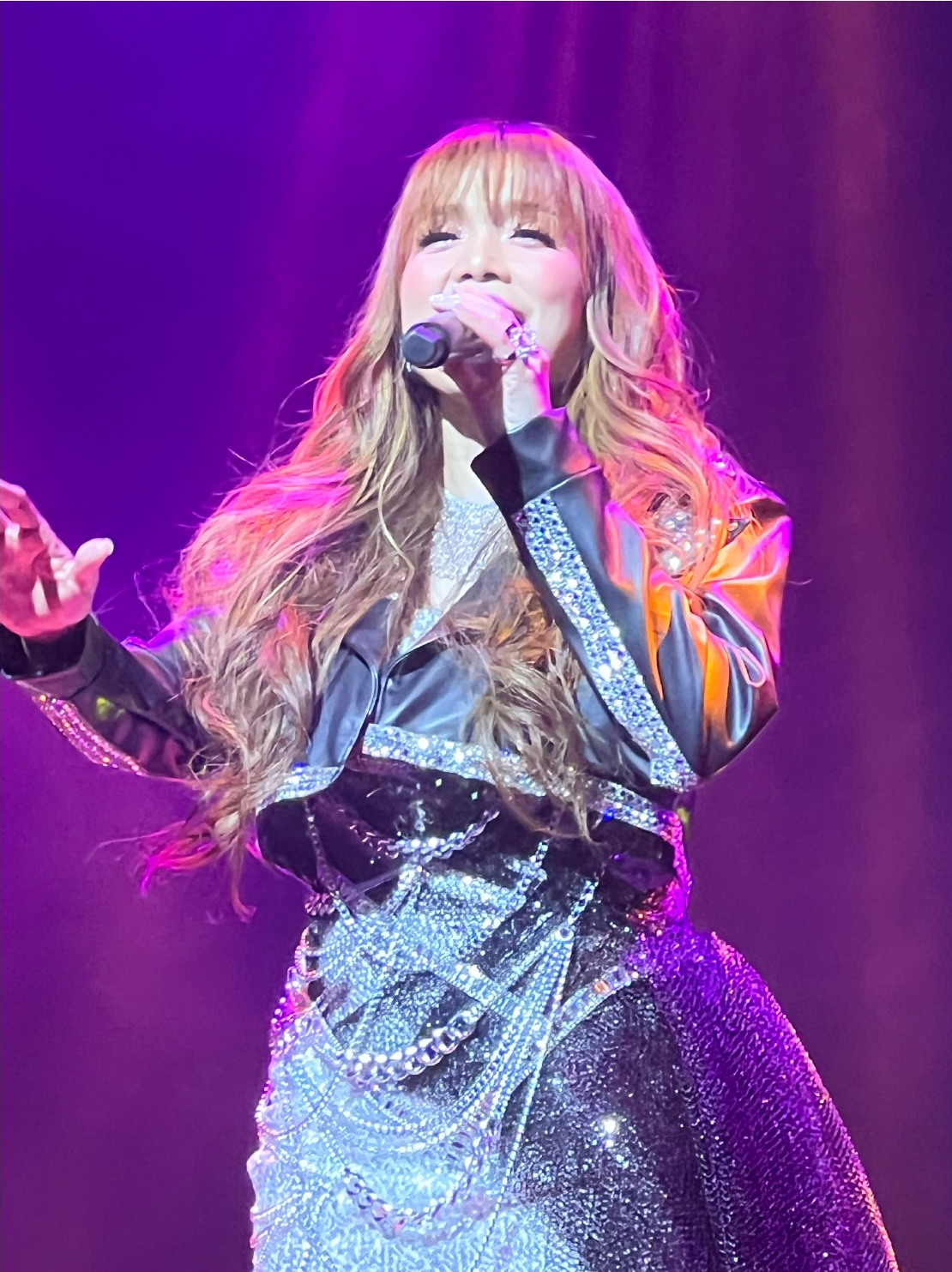
- Nina performing in November 2023
- Born: Marifil Niña Barinos Girado; November 1, 1980 (age 45); Pasay, Metro Manila, Philippines
- Occupations: Singer; record producer
- Years active: 2000–present
- Spouse: Coy Enriquez (m. 2015)
- Children: 1
- Relatives: King Girado (brother)
- Musical career
- Genres: Pop; R&B; acoustic; dance
- Instruments: Vocals, piano
- Labels: Warner; Universal; Viva
- Website: ninasoulsiren.com

Marifil Niña Barinos Girado-Enriquez (born November 1, 1980), known mononymously as Nina, is a Filipino singer and record producer. She made her recording debut in 2002 after signing with Warner Music Philippines. Her first two studio albums produced the chart-topping singles "Jealous", "Foolish Heart" and "Make You Mine", and earned her the Favorite New Artist award on both Awit Awards and MTV Pilipinas Music Awards. In 2005 she released her third album Nina Live! which was certified diamond by the Philippine Association of the Record Industry (PARI). The album yielded her most successful single, "Love Moves in Mysterious Ways", and her biggest solo concert to date.

In 2006, she released her eponymous studio album which earned her eight Awit Award nominations. The album's second single "Someday" achieved commercial success, and gained popularity in South Korea and various Asian countries. Later, she received criticism for releasing too many covers, and was involved in a financial conflict against her ex-boyfriend Nyoy Volante's parents which was eventually resolved under legal process. She regained success in 2009 after touring with the Sessionistas, along with the release of her last studio album under Warner, Renditions of the Soul. She signed with Universal Records in 2010, and represented her country in the Pattaya International Music Festival a year later. In 2013, she released her seventh studio album All Good under her new record label, Viva Records. She was one of Spotify's most-streamed female OPM artists in 2018 and 2020.

Referred to as the "Asia's Diamond Soul Siren", she is known for her wide vocal range and her signature use of the whistle register. She was recognized as R&B Artist of the Year by Philippine Business Excellence Award in 2004 and by Philippine Hip-Hop Awards in 2007. She was cited as the artist who popularized the acoustic phenomenon in the Philippines, and was awarded Best Female Acoustic Artist by the National Consumers Quality Awards in 2005. Mega listed her as one of the Women to Watch in 2004. Her album Nina Live! is the fourth best-selling certified album, best-selling live album, and best-selling album of the 2000s in the Philippines. She holds the record as the first female OPM artist to receive a diamond certification by the PARI. In 2009, she was named as the best-selling female recording artist by the Box Office Entertainment Awards. She has won ten Awit Awards, two Aliw Awards, two Myx Music Awards and the Special Achievement Award by Wave 89.1 Urban Music Awards in 2011.

== Early life and education ==
Marifil Niña Girado was born on November 1, 1980, in Pasay, Metro Manila, Philippines. She is the third child of Filbert Girado Sr., a businessman and member of the Bayanihan Boys Choir, and Maria Daulet (née Barinos), a nurse who plays piano. She was raised in Quezon City together with her three siblings Dewanne, who is member of the band Lipstick, King, who is also a singer, and Patrick, who is a musical director. When Nina was about to turn five years old, she started singing to a Lea Salonga single she heard on the radio and her father noticed. After seeing the potential in his daughter, Filbert trained Nina's singing skills. Like the traditional technique of vocalization, she was submerged into a drum of water while belting out her high notes. Later, she was declared as daily winner on GMA Lunchdate's "Bulilit Jamboree" in 1985. In 1991, she became seven-week winner on Philippine competition show, Tanghalan ng Kampeon, with her interpretations of "Better Days" and "Love Takes Time".

Filbert's plans for Nina changed when she grew older. Instead of a professional music career, he wanted his daughter to earn a college degree and to join him in the United States to find work. She studied Accountancy at Miriam College since she was good in numbers. Her father insisted that she would take up Law as a latter course. Due to her love for singing, she went against her father's wishes. At seventeen, she became a vocalist of the XS band. He eventually gave up on trying to stop her, and just told her to maintain good grades. She did well in her studies and became a consistent dean's lister.

In 2000, she finished Accountancy while performing for different bands including The Big Thing, MYMP, Silk and the Essence. After college, she recorded an amateur demo CD with the help of a friend. It was composed of three tracks including her rendition of Steve Perry's "Foolish Heart", "Breathe Again" and "Against All Odds (Take a Look at Me Now)." The demo was recorded in a home studio with only a guitar for accompaniment. Her brother King brought her demo to different recording labels. Ricky Ilacad, who was managing director of Warner Music Philippines at the time, listened to the recordings and immediately planned to sign her up even without seeing or hearing her in person. Two months after her father died of a heart attack in the U.S., Nina signed her first recording contract with Warner.

== Career ==
=== 2002–2004: Career beginnings, Heaven and Smile ===
In August 2002, Nina released her debut album under Warner Music, entitled Heaven, alongside her first single of the same title. The album is inspired by contemporary R&B and pop music, and it was well received by critics, with The Philippine Star stating "Heaven is quite a package. Production is sleek and Nina's delivery, smooth [...] it is never heavy nor frenetic. It is instead used as a stable base for Nina's sweet but definitely multi-octave singing voice." The lead single, "Heaven", did not really become a commercial hit despite peaking inside the top ten of Philippine charts. In December 2002, "2nd Floor" was released as a radio-only single. Even though the song was not commercially released, it charted inside the top ten and won her the Best R&B Song award on the 16th Annual Awit Awards in 2003. "Jealous" was released as the second official single and it became Nina's first number one hit, topping various Philippine charts for three weeks. It also allowed her to grab the Best New Artist award on both Awit Awards and MTV Pilipinas Music Awards in 2003. The third commercial single is her acoustic version of Steve Perry's "Foolish Heart", which became her second number one single as it charted even better than her previous releases. The song was a critical acclaim, being described by critics as "proof of Nina's musicality." "Loving You", a Ric Segreto original, became the last commercial single from Heaven. It did not top the local charts, but peaked inside the top five. In October 2003, the album was re-released when it reached the double platinum mark.

In December 2003, Nina released her second studio album, Smile, accompanied by its lead single, "Make You Mine". According to The Philippine Star, the album's sound is "bigger and bolder" compared to Heaven, consisting of upbeat rhythmic jams and powerful sentimental ballads. Philippine Daily Inquirer commented that Smile is a "smoothly-produced album, polished enough to give it an even keel, ensuring smooth sailing all throughout." "Make You Mine" was described as a "rich harmonic chemistry of Nina's mesmerizing vocals and hypnotic urban-style beats with a blend of funky strings, an upbeat R&B piece that offers a blissful listening experience." It became her third number-one single, making Nina the first female OPM artist to have three number-one singles in a span of one year. The following single, "A Girl Can Dream", features her labelmate Christian Bautista in the music video. The song peaked inside the top five of charts. "Sayang Naman" is the first Tagalog single that she released and it became the last commercial single from the album. It reached the top ten of local charts, but is considered to be her least successful single at the time. Smile gave Nina her songwriting debut with the song "Can't Say I Love You". The song was described as a "sensually engaging ballad." In a later interview, she revealed that while recording "I'll Always Stay in Love This Way", she was going through a recent break-up contrary to the song's context. She stated "I couldn’t sing. I was crying nonstop, so I called the A&R director and said I couldn’t do it because my tears wouldn’t stop".

In early 2004, Nina became part of the recording for the song "Biyahe Tayo" which was used for the WOW Philippines...Biyahe Tayo! campaign, promoting Philippine tourism. Among other artists were Lea Salonga, Sharon Cuneta, Francis Magalona and the APO Hiking Society. In August 2004, she staged a back-to-back residency at the Music Museum with Nyoy Volante entitled El Niño, La Niña which ended after a month and five shows. In November 2004, she was chosen by American songwriter Diane Warren to record the Cyndi Lauper original "I Don't Want to Be Your Friend", which eventually became a chart-topping hit. It was released as single for the Asian version of Warren's love songs compilation, Diane Warren Presents Love Songs. In the same month, Warner Music Philippines released a Christmas album which features Nina and the label's most-requested singers at the time, namely Christian Bautista, Kitchie Nadal, Dice & K9, Paolo Santos, Thor and Artstrong. Following the album's release, they staged a major concert as a group, held at the Folk Arts Theater entitled Pop Ko 'To! The All-Star, All-Hits Concert. In the same year, she appeared on the debut albums of Bautista and her brother, King.

=== 2005–2007: Commercial success with Nina Live! and Nina ===
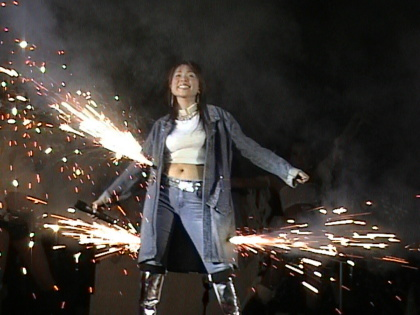
Nina performing on her Nina Live! Tour in San Pablo City in 2005.

In 2005, Nina temporarily broke away from the urban-influenced sound to record covers of classic love songs. She came out with her first live album, Nina Live!. The album is composed of classic love songs from the 1970s to the 1990s, which she recorded live at the PHI Resto and Bar in Metro Manila on January 30, 2005. According to her, the idea of a live album started when Warner saw her performing on different bars and lounges. The label told her, "Why not put it in CD form or in a DVD, so that the people could take home [her] show." The first single, "Love Moves in Mysterious Ways", was released in February 2005 along with the album. It peaked at number one on local charts for twelve consecutive weeks, becoming Nina's biggest hit to date. Before the second single was released, Nina Live! was already certified 3× Platinum by the Philippine Association of the Record Industry (PARI), eventually selling 90,000 units in the Philippines. "Through the Fire" is the second official single which also peaked at number one for a week. The song features her highest recorded vocal register in full chest voice to date. "Constantly" was released as the third official single and was immediately followed by the final commercial single, "I Love You Goodbye", which later charted at number 3 in the short-lived Billboard Philippines Catalog Chart. Nina Live! sold over 300,000 copies in the Philippines in 2009, certifying 10× Platinum (Diamond) by the PARI and becoming the fourth best-selling album in the Philippines. It is also the best-selling live album and best-selling album of the 2000s. The album allowed Nina to become the first female artist in the Philippines to receive a Diamond certification. Overall, she is the third artist next to Jose Mari Chan and Eraserheads. Aside from outstanding commercial performance, Nina Live! was well received by OPM critics. In a review, Titik Pilipino stated "this album only proves that Nina can do wonderfully with covers." Nina Live! was later released in home video, and was followed by a concert at the Araneta Coliseum.

In 2005, Nina was ranked 75th on FHM Philippines' 100 Sexiest Women in the World. In the same year, she collaborated with American singer Joe Pizzulo in his album, All the Best. In February 2006, she recorded the theme song for I Will Always Love You, which eventually became the highest-grossing movie of GMA Films at the time. On June 2, 2006, Nina launched her first solo residency at the Music Museum entitled Very Manilow, a Barry Manilow tribute concert series. The month-long residency consisted of eight shows, two nights a week for four weeks and featured Christian Bautista, Jed Madela, Nyoy Volante and Troy Montero as guest acts. This was immediately followed by another eight-show residency entitled Nina... Gold (Precious OPM Hits) where she performed classic OPM songs from the 1980s to 2000s. Guest acts include Nonoy Zuñiga, Gary Granada, Noel Cabangon and Volante. The first show was staged on November 16 at the Music Museum. In the same year, she was selected as spokesperson for Goldilocks Bakeshop's 40th anniversary along with the release of promotional single "Araw Mo". She also appeared on Hotsilog: The ASAP Hotdog Compilation with her cover of Hotdog's seductive ballad "Lumapit Ka".

Nina released her self-titled fourth album in August 2006. She decided to name the album after herself considering that she already established her name as an artist, and was willing to share more to her listeners. She admitted that Nyoy Volante was an inspiration for the album, saying that his compositions "were just so beautiful and inspiring that eventually I was encouraged to create an all-original album." Titik Pilipino praised her in an album review, saying "Nina does almost everything right [...] She's more refined, polished." On the November–December 2006 issue of MYX Mag, Mike Luis of Freestyle reacted positively to the album, stating "The mid-tempo tracks are groove-worthy, the slow jams are sexy, and the two remakes were nicely done." "I Do", a song that is heavily influenced by R&B-dance, was released as the album's lead single. Shortly after, the second single "Someday" was released and topped the local charts for eight consecutive weeks. The song became both a commercial and critical acclaim, with Philippine Daily Inquirer commenting " the introspective, traffic-stopping 'Someday' that boasts of a rich melody and Nina's emotive panache." In 2007, she released the third and final single, "I Can't Make You Love Me", which became a success, as well. In a review, Philippine Daily Inquirer stated "Bonnie Raitt's anthemic song for the lovelorn is hard to top, but Nina gives a beautifully dressed-down version."

In August 2007, Nina recorded and released "Collide", a theme song for the sci-fi indie film Xenoa which was directed by Sean Lim. The song was nominated for Best Song Written for Movie/TV/Stage Play on the 2008 Awit Awards. On September 28, 2007, she re-released her eponymous album, this time, entitled Nina (Special Limited Edition) - Featuring the Hits of Barry Manilow. The re-issue consists of two discs—the standard edition of Nina and a nine-track disc which features her covers of Barry Manilow classics. This concept was inspired by her 2006 eight-show residency at the Music Museum, entitled Very Manilow. "Somewhere Down the Road" and "If I Should Love Again" were released as singles and were both commercially successful. Nina (Special Limited Edition) was eventually certified Platinum by the PARI, finishing 2× Platinum combined with the standard release. One month later, Warner Music and Club Myx released a remix album of Nina's popular songs which were re-invented by DJ Dense Modesto. It was titled Nina in the Mix: The Dense Modesto Remixes. In November 2007, she appeared in QTV-11's documentary TV show Balikbayan where she visited her hometown Roxas, Capiz. In the same year, she was featured in Thor's studio album, Soul Obsessions... Duets with Thor, performing a cover duet of Mariah Carey's power ballad "Whenever You Call".

=== 2008–2010: Professional and personal setbacks, and Renditions of the Soul ===
In 2008, Nina released her fourth studio album, a cover album entitled Nina Sings the Hits of Diane Warren, which consists of classic love ballads written by award-winning songwriter Diane Warren. The album was certified Gold by the PARI one week after its commercial release. Eventually, it reached Platinum status with 30,000 units sold. Its official singles include the Aerosmith original, "I Don't Want to Miss a Thing", and the Faith Hill original, "There You'll Be", which Nina describes as a "thank you" to her fans. She expressed her gratitude in an interview, saying "I still have much to fulfill [...] I owe it to my fans [...] showering me with love and unbridled affection." The album was panned by critics, with Titik Pilipino stating "To be honest, what [they]'ve been expecting at this point in Nina's career is an album of original compositions suited to her voice [...] she didn't have to shout and be a vocal Chinese acrobat." OPM critics reacted negatively to the kind of musical process she was doing, noticing that her most popular albums, Nina Live! and Nina Featuring the Hits of Barry Manilow, contain covers. Her most popular singles, "Love Moves in Mysterious Ways", "Foolish Heart" and "Through the Fire", are also revivals. In an interview with the entertainment press at Red Box, Nina defended herself, saying "It's fulfilling to sing any song, maybe a cover or an original song, just the fact that I'm singing is fulfilling enough." She further stated that her fans were the ones who requested it. In the same year, she was featured on the self-titled debut album of Gabby Concepcion.

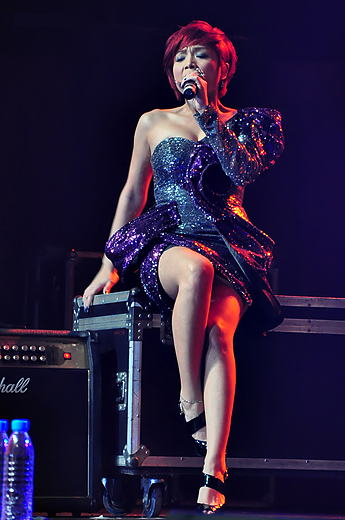
Nina performing on ASAP Sessionistas Live in Cebu City.

In January 2009, ASAP, a musical variety show on ABS-CBN where Nina has been a regular performer since 2003, paired her with other artists who are also in-demand performers in various bars and restaurants. Among them are Duncan Ramos, Aiza Seguerra, MYMP, Sitti and Richard Poon, forming a group called the "Sessionistas." The Sessionistas became the most-requested jamming segment on the show, leading the ABS-CBN management to stage the ASAP Sessionistas Live concert at the Araneta Coliseum. The concert at the big dome was sold-out, and it was followed with other sold-out concerts in Cebu City, Batangas City and in their U.S. tour. On May 8, 2009, Nina was invited as special guest on STAR World's variety talk show, Asia Uncut, making her the second and last Filipino to appear in the show, next to Lea Salonga. During her interview, she was officially declared as the "Asia's Soul Siren." In 2009, Nina publicly announced that she would file an estafa (fraud) case against ex-boyfriend Nyoy Volante's parents, Evangeline and Oliver, due to failure in fully settling their debts amounting to ₱1.4 million in total. She decided to finally take legal action after the couple broke the compromise agreement between the two parties.

In September 2009, Nina released her fifth studio album, Renditions of the Soul, another cover album which came from her special weekly acoustic radio show of the same title which aired on Wave 89.1 during Friday and Sunday evenings. The album gave her record-producing debut when she produced all the album's tracks herself. It was well received by critics, with Manila Bulletin stating "The 17-track album is more emotionally subtle, yet the songs just have as equally powerful messages like her previous hits [...] Nina's singing perfectly renders the message of every selection: Love, longing and the purity of emotional surrender." "I'm Yours" was released in May 2010 as the only commercial single from the album. Warner held a sing-along contest for Nina fans and the winner got the chance to be on the single's music video. However, the single had no promotion, since Nina has left the label during its release. The video barely features her, and just shows some of her photos from the Renditions of the Soul album photo shoot. The album was commercially successful, being able to reach Platinum status in July 2010 despite having the least promotion.

After receiving a Diamond certification by the PARI for Nina Live! in October 2009, Sarah Geronimo's fans protested Nina getting the award ahead of Geronimo. Nina immediately stated in an interview that she deserves the award, and that there was no conflict between her and Geronimo. In November 2009, she revealed that she is engaged with her non-showbiz boyfriend, Coy Enriquez. Early in 2010, she had sold-out concerts with multi-diamond awardee Jose Mari Chan, Freestyle, Side A, Richard Poon, Sam Milby and The Company, including her two-night solo concert at the Music Museum entitled Nina... The Diamond Soul Siren. On June 30, 2010, she performed the song "Bagong Pilipinas", together with other artists, on the inauguration of Philippine President Benigno Aquino III. She wore a green Filipiniana dress for the event. On July 9, 2010, she performed with South Border and Kris Lawrence on Usher's concert in Manila as a front act. On September 11, 2010, she performed live on Billy Crawford's 25 B.C. concert at the Music Museum as a special guest. In October 2010, Warner released her four-disc box set greatest hits compilation, entitled Diamond: Greatest Hits 2002-2010. Her cover of "Love Will Lead You Back" was used as the album's only single. In December 2010, she performed "Hagkan", which was originally recorded by Sharon Cuneta, as theme song for ABS-CBN TV series Sabel. In 2010, she was named as the best-selling female recording artist of 2009 by the Guillermo Mendoza Memorial Scholarship Foundation. In the same year, she also appeared on the albums of Jay R, Kris Aquino and Poon.

=== 2011–2013: International exposure, Stay Alive and All Good ===
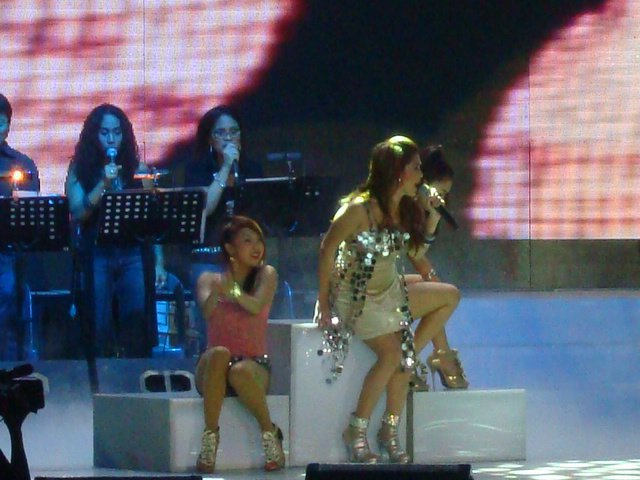
Nina performing live on ASAP Sessionistas 20.11 at the Araneta Coliseum.

In January 2011, Nina was presented with a Special Achievement Award by the Wave 89.1 Urban Music Awards for her notable chart-topping singles and remarkable album sales, particularly for the diamond-certified Nina Live!. On February 5, she staged a pre-Valentine concert with the Sessionistas at the Araneta Coliseum entitled ASAP Sessionistas 20.11. Her performances of "Note to God" and "Got to Be There" were applauded by fans and critics alike. Later, she was cast as Megara and Deianira on Hercules 12, a pop-emo stage musical, but eventually dropped out due to scheduling conflicts. On March 18, she represented her country at the 2011 Pattaya International Music Festival in Thailand where she performed alongside pop artists from different Asian countries, including Derrick Hoh, Golf & Mike, Chin Chinawut and Ice Saranyu. During her stay in Pattaya, the city government presented her with a Golden Key to the City. On March 25, she was featured in a short documentary, along with Gary Valenciano, which aired on South Korean network tvN Asia. In June 2011, issues of maltreatment to her former personal assistant surfaced the news. She denied the allegations, saying that her former P.A. has always been given proper compensation and that the Volante family were the ones who created the issue. In August 2011, she joined the ASAP Sessionistas in their second U.S. tour which completed its final leg on September 5. In December 2011, she performed as guest act in the concerts by Noel Cabangon and Duncan Ramos, respectively. In the same year, she was featured on Kris Aquino's compilation and Cabangon's fourth studio album.

Late in 2010, Nina revealed that she was recording a studio album which was set for release in mid-January 2011. Originally, it was set to be the first of her two-album recording deal with her new label, Universal Records. After a couple of push-backs, Stay Alive was finally released on November 19, 2011. In choosing such title for the album, she explained, "It's like some people are saying that I'm gone [...] So I'm here to say that I'm still here and staying alive." She called the album "special" due to the fact that she contributed from its musical production to the cover art design." Stay Alive was a universal acclaim, being called "futuristic and edgy" by critics who also predicted that it "may set new trends in Filipino music," tagging Nina as the new "dance diva." Philippine Entertainment Portal praised the album, stating "Stay Alive is a testament to Nina's evolution as an artist and determination to be a better performer." "Dance" was released on October 6, 2011, as the lead single from the album. Nina explained, "The carrier single is a dance song for it to be different from my previous albums." The song is described as "an upbeat track with a catchy melody." Its music video was released on December 9, and features Nina in Gaga-ish costumes while performing a dance routine. Due to lack of promotion, the song failed to achieve commercial success. On January 30, 2012, "However Much Love" was released as a pre-Valentine promotional single. The song was critically acclaimed, being called a "standout" by Abby Mendoza of Philippine Entertainment Portal. It was a commercial success as well, becoming Nina's first chart-topper since 2008. On February 13, she staged a pre-Valentine concert entitled Update Your Status... at the Music Museum which supported the album. In the same month, she expressed disappointment with the album's lack of promotion, saying "[Universal] always have a meeting, but no actions are initiated. They give us schedules that are not really followed. When it's already okay, then they cancel it." On April 14, she staged another concert at the Music Museum, entitled Timeless: Tribute to a Diva, which was dedicated to late pop diva Whitney Houston. "Believe in the Dream" was released on April 24, 2012, as the third single from Stay Alive, accompanied by a lyric video.

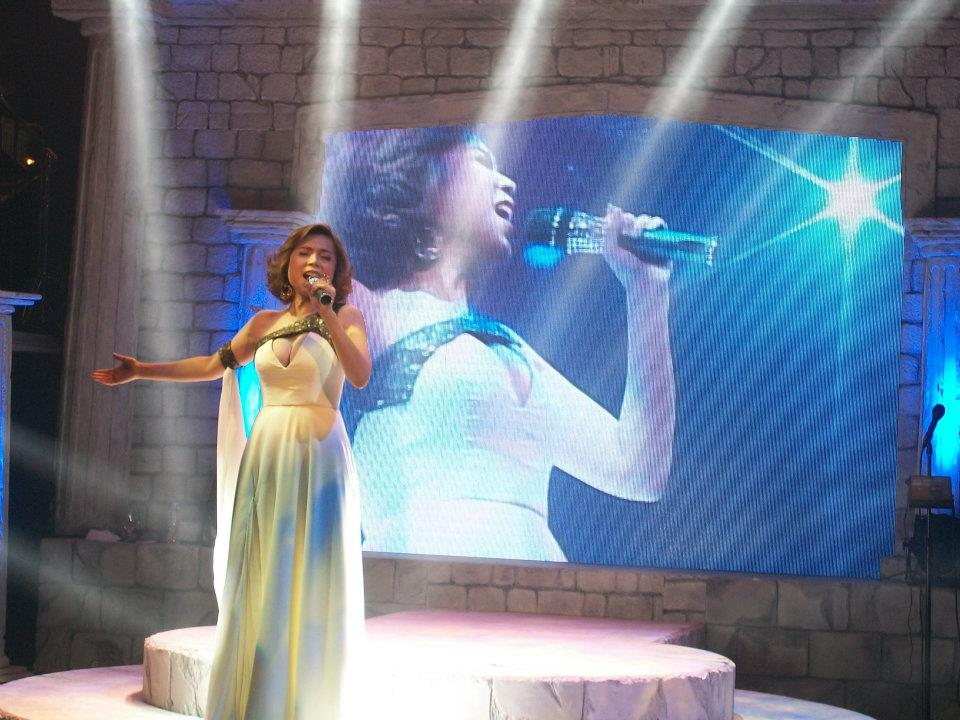
Nina performing "One Moment in Time" on her Timeless: Tribute to a Diva concert.

On May 8, 2012, Nina signed a five-year recording deal with Viva Records, following the expiration of her contract with Universal. In an interview, she stated that during her Love2Love2Love concert in 2010—which was produced by Viva Entertainment, the label's head Vicente Del Rosario, Jr. expressed interest in managing her career. However, she has already signed under Universal at the time. Shortly after her separation with the label, she transferred to Viva with the help of Geleen Eugenio. She expressed working on a new album, saying that it will have "the same Nina sound [...] New songs maybe, can be cover, can be original, but we're eyeing on original songs." She also planned to do acting workshop in Singapore, stating "I myself, honestly, don't know much about acting. So if ever I will star in a movie, I'm not half-baked, I'll be prepared. And also for myself, I want to be prepared, especially if I'm heading straight into a new direction." Nina posed on the Burlesque-inspired cover of Playboy Philippines magazine's May—June 2012 special issue where she is seen nude, only her private body parts being covered. She stated that it was personally her decision to do a daring shoot, and later explained that it is her way of "immortalizing herself in her best shape yet." She also mentioned working on a big theatrical play as preparation for her acting debut. In October 2012, she appeared in a cameo role for the film A Secret Affair, where she performed the movie theme song "Don't Say Goodbye". In the last quarter of 2012, she was given a weekly segment on TV5 variety show Wil Time Bigtime entitled "InstaJam," and was promoted to regular performer in 2013 for the segment entitled "Mini Concierto" under the show's new title Wowowillie.

On January 25, 2013, Nina staged her comeback concert at the Music Museum entitled Nina Reborn, accompanied by the release of her first album under Viva Records entitled All Good. The concert had its cable television premiere on May 4, 2013, at 9:30 p.m. (PST) on Filipino cable channel PBO (Pinoy Box Office). Manila Bulletin gave Nina Reborn positive response, saying "Nina as a powerhouse singer is a given, but the seeming restraint she demonstrated that night was just as effective and lent her vocals more heft and soul." The Philippine Star stated, "Nina is one of those interpreters who can take on any song [...] The results are very good." All Good consists mostly of original songs, with five cover versions of OPM classics. The album was a critical acclaim, with The Philippine Star explaining that its purpose is "not to surpass her previous achievements, but to empower its belief that [Nina] has more to offer as a recording artist." Journal praised the album's sound, stating "A more mature Nina is what people will hear [...] All Good is a suite of beautiful songs." "Sa Isang Tingin" was released on February 23, 2013, as lead single for the album. It was described to having a "strong melody [that is] somewhat influenced by high-recall Tagalog songs of the yesteryears." Despite being claimed as an official single, no music video was recorded for the song's promotion. On March 3, "Hurting Inside" was released as a promotional single, accompanied by a lyric video published on Viva Records' official YouTube page. On October 22, "When the Love Is Gone" was used as theme song for the 2013 romantic drama film of the same title.

=== 2014–2019: Hiatus, pregnancy and co-headlining shows ===
In February 2015, Nina made a special appearance on the 20th-year anniversary of variety show ASAP where her performance of "Vision of Love" with fellow singers Juris and Kyla became a trending topic in social media. After taking a break from showbiz, Nina publicly announced her secret marriage with husband Coy Enriquez and giving birth to a baby girl, Ysabelle Louise, on December 24, 2015. In an interview with Philippine Entertainment Portal, she expressed her decision to keep her personal life private, stating "I chose to be quiet and just go on with my life normally. I have people in my life who are also into their privacy. [I don't want to drag them in my world] which is totally different to theirs." She added that she is not hooked in social media and she often just post pictures to promote her shows. In 2015, she became part of TV5 reality singing competition Rising Stars Philippines as one of the judges. On June 14, 2016, she was featured on the debut single of R&B duo Joshua Desiderio and Lloyd Zaragoza (JO.LLO), entitled "Ikaw ang Bida." On July 1, she staged a back-to-back concert with Joey G at the Music Museum entitled Versions and Verses. The concert was a success and a second show was held on October 12, 2017, entitled Versions and Verses: The Repeat.

On June 19, 2017, Nina made an appearance on Wish 107.5's Wish Bus roadshow where she performed Charlie Puth's "Attention" and her hit single "Jealous". The event was co-produced by Warner Music, her original record label. During the show, she announced returning to Warner for release of her eighth studio album. Nina had her acting debut for the indie film DAD: Durugin ang Droga, which is an advocacy film promoting awareness on drug addiction. The film was directed by Dinky Doo J. Clarion, supposedly for the 2017 Pista ng Pelikulang Pilipino, and was released in September 2017. On October 28, 2018, Nina collaborated with David Pomeranz and Joey G on an international concert, entitled Love, Soul & Magic, held at the Club Regent Event Centre, Winnipeg. In February 2019, Nina and Pomeranz embarked on a two-show U.S. tour, this time with Jay R, entitled Heart and Soul 3.0. The shows took place at Pechanga Resort & Casino and Palace Theatre, California. On September 14, she performed as special guest for Bugoy Drilon and Daryl Ong's BND concert at the Newport Performing Arts Theater.

=== 2020–present: Online concerts and stage comeback ===
During the nationwide community lockdown amidst the COVID-19 pandemic, Nina staged a two-hour acoustic concert via Facebook Live. The live streaming was held on April 6, 2020, as a treat to her fans and followers, gathering a total of 917,000 (24,000 concurrent) views. Her live cover of Crash Landing on You soundtrack, "Flower," gained popularity on social media. She later performed the song on variety show ASAP with various artists and on KTO Manila #AnnyeongKorea special. On April 16, Nina admitted she became interested in the Korean Wave so much that she stayed in South Korea for a month to undergo K-pop sing and dance workshop. On April 25, she performed as special guest on Lazada Sing-It! live streaming alongside Katrina Velarde. The fan-requested set list included her singles "Loving You," "Through the Fire," and "Foolish Heart." On October 11, Nina celebrated the 15th anniversary of Nina Live! in A2Z/Kapamilya Channel show ASAP. On November 1, KTX.ph streamed her first ever birthday concert entitled Nina Live! The Birthday Virtual Concert in various countries including Canada, Australia, Japan, South Korea and UAE. The following day, she was featured in Monster RX 93.1 Concert Series where she revealed that her management is working on her official YouTube vlog for 2021, and that she has started recording for her upcoming album. On November 7, Nina was eliminated in TV5 reality singing show Masked Singer Pilipinas after performing "Big Spender" by Shirley Bassey under the alias Bee-Ni-Bee-Ni. The judges, however, failed to guess her real identity.

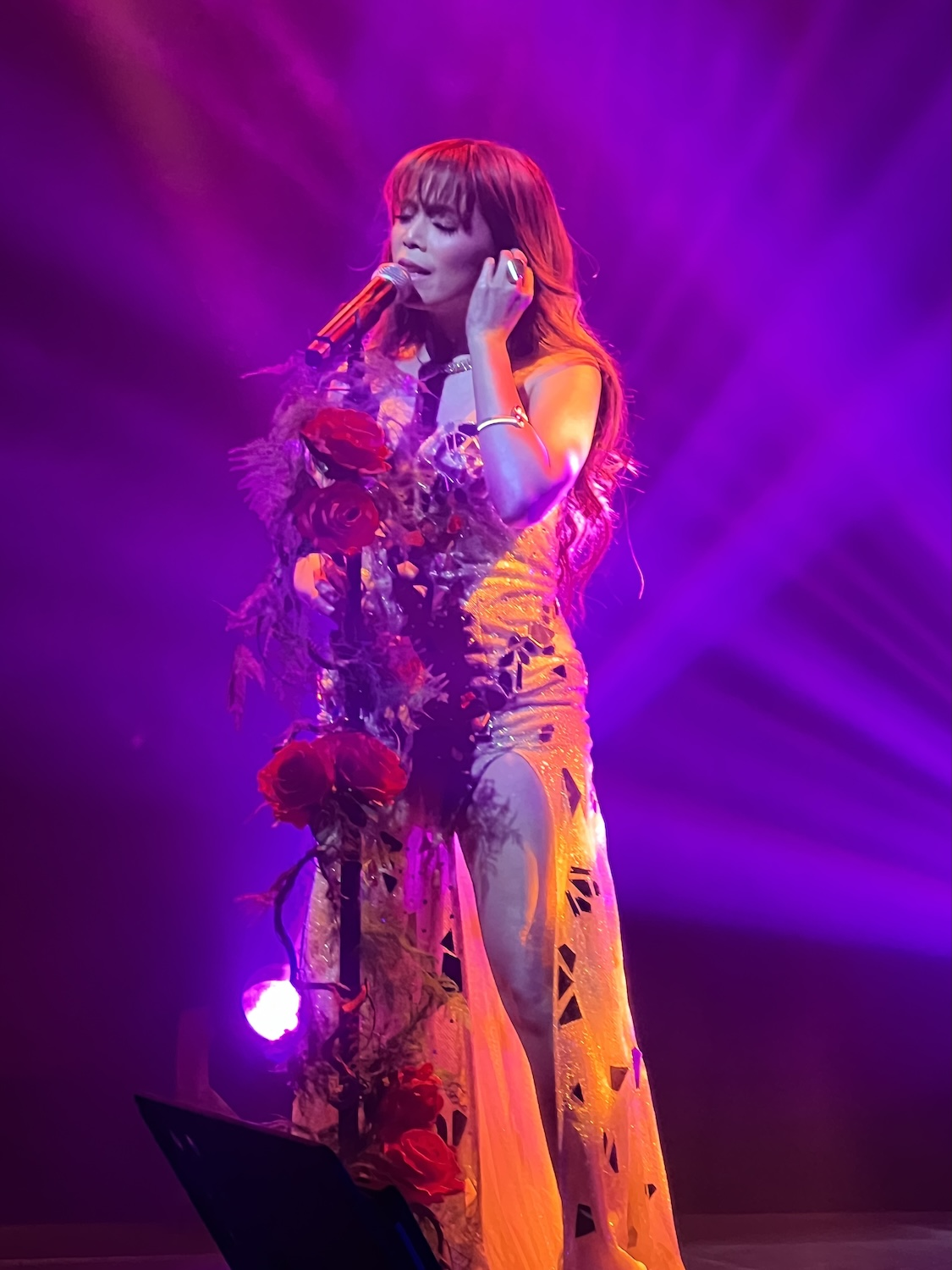
Nina performing on her 2023 birthday concert at the Samsung Hall.

One year after her 2020 Facebook Live concert, Nina staged a three-hour long concert on April 5, 2021, which gathered 1.3 million total (24,000 concurrent) viewers. In the same night, #NinaLive and "Foolish Heart" became trending topics on Twitter. The meme "Ano pala apelyido ni Nina [What is the surname of Nina]?" also went viral in social media, and started a series of memes on Filipino celebrities using mononym. Like the previous one, the concert was held during Enhanced Community Quarantine (ECQ) re-imposition period. The following day, she launched her official YouTube vlog Soul Siren Nina Official. On October 15, 2021, Viva Entertainment premiered her 2013 concert special Nina Live at the Amerasian through Vivamax subscription-based streaming service as pilot episode of a 12-part concert series. Days prior to this, she announced her online concert Nina Live: The Divas Edition which later streamed live on November 30 and December 1 through KTX.ph. In 2022, she staged a 16-show U.S. Tour entitled Love Moves which kicked off on May 7 in Skokie, Illinois and finished on June 25 in Los Angeles. On September 23, she released the single "How Can I", a collaboration with songwriter and producer Jonathan Manalo in celebration of his 20th year in the Philippine music industry. In October 2022, she performed as guest act for Danish rock band Michael Learns to Rock's Back on the Road Tour—Philippine leg finishing three shows overall. In an interview, Nina stated that she will finally release a long-awaited single by the end of the year or the following year. She described the song as "a feel-good song with [her] own touch. So, it’s kind of like acoustic." On March 10, 2023, she staged her second solo U.S. Tour entitled Love Moves Part 2, consisting of ten shows, and an additional Canadian Tour, consisting of six shows which kicked off on April 9, 2023. On November 8, she staged her first face-to-face major concert after the pandemic quarantine, entitled Only Nina, at the Samsung Hall. The show celebrated her 43rd birthday and was directed by John Prats. During the concert, Nina announced a second show of the same title which was later held at the Waterfront Cebu City Hotel & Casino on February 9, 2024 as a pre-Valentine event.

In January 2024, Nina stated in an interview that her upcoming album is still in the works and that she prefers to release it through an independent record label. On October 25, 2024, she collaborated with Hindley Street Country Club and released an alternate version of her number-one hit, "Foolish Heart", which eventually reached 1.3 million views in YouTube by the end of same year. On October 30, she staged her 44th birthday concert entitled Love, Nina at The Theater at Solaire. The Philippine Star commended her vocal condition, stating "That night, in her own rendition, Nina effortlessly navigated the high and low notes of the song. There was not a time when she frayed or got off-key. Kudos to Nina for preserving her voice." On December 10, she made an appearance on Wish 107.5's Wish Bus roadshow at the Newport City, Metro Manila where she performed her singles "Someday" and "Foolish Heart". On February 7, 2025, she performed in a pre-Valentine concert at the New Frontier Theater, entitled Love Matters. The show included a 16-piece orchestra and featured some broadway songs. Like her previous concerts, it was directed by Prats. On February 8, the Sessionistas staged a reunion concert at The Theater at Solaire wherein fans questioned the absence of Nina and fellow performer Richard Poon. On February 14, she embarked on a three-leg tour in Australia, entitled Nina Live, held in the cities of Sydney, Melbourne and Perth. In the same month, TV5 announced that Nina was chosen as judge for the third season of karaoke singing competition Sing Galing!. On June 27, 2025, she began her third Love Moves U.S. Tour, consisting of 11 shows, which kicked off in Arizona and will conclude on August 2 in West Covina.

== Artistry ==
=== Influences ===
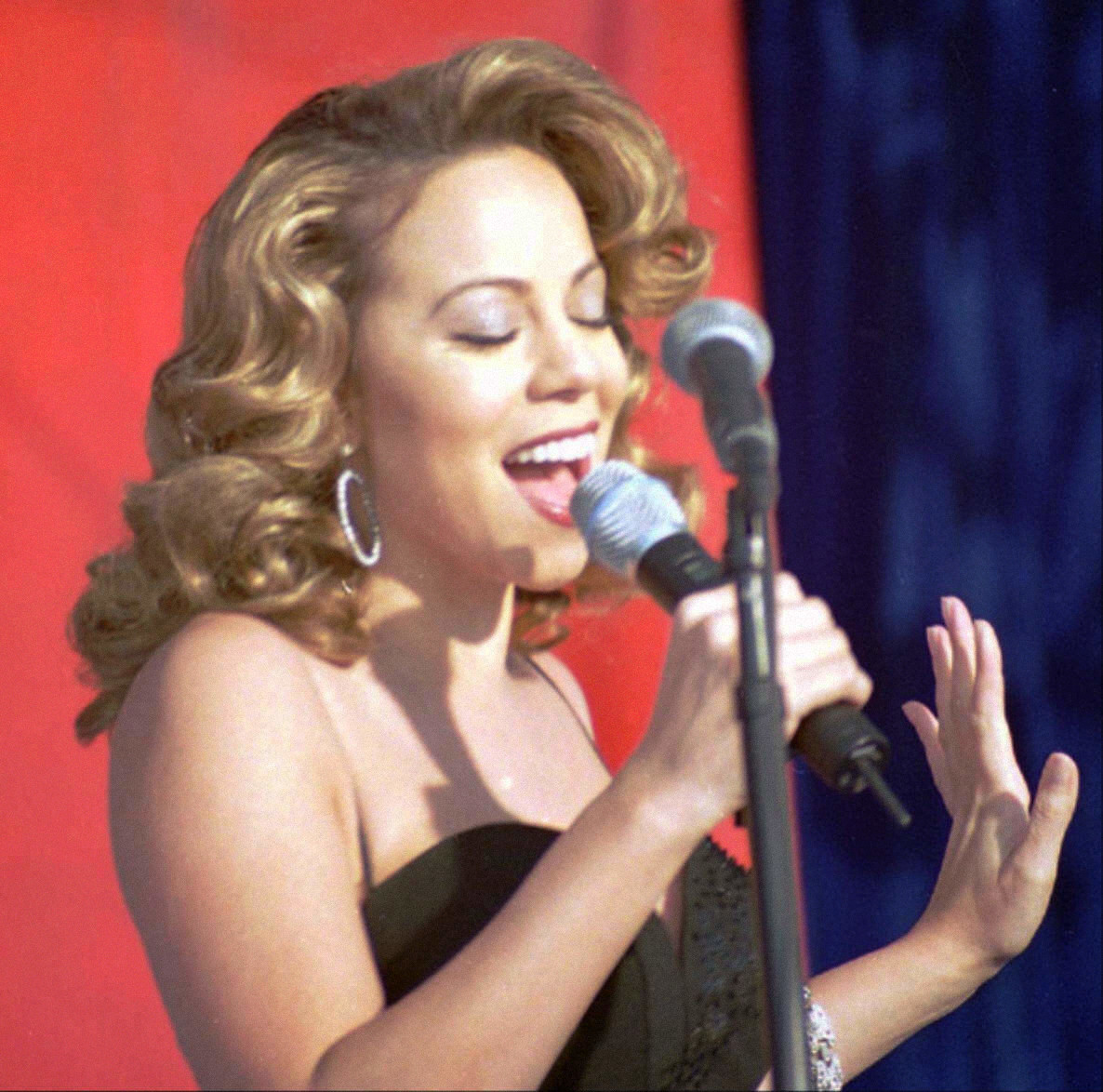
Nina has cited Mariah Carey as her main influence.

Nina has cited Mariah Carey as main influence in her singing career, notably in her debut album Heaven (2002). She is known to have a similar vocal range, musical style and prominent use of the whistle register. She has performed Carey's songs both in her arena concerts and small venue live shows. Early in her career, Nina admitted that she never attempted to watch concerts before she became a recording artist until Carey's Charmbracelet Tour in Manila. In an interview, she stressed the originality of her sound, saying "It's not like I want my career to imitate or even be compared with [Carey]'s. In the end, I want to be acknowledged as a singer of my own brand of music." Aside from Carey, she has cited Whitney Houston, Alicia Keys, Gary Valenciano, Ella May Saison and Regine Velasquez as influences.

Apart from singing, Nina plays musical instruments such as piano and acoustic guitar. She credits her older brothers for her interest in playing instruments. When she was nine years old, she substituted for her brother during piano lessons, stating "That's how I learned do-re-mi. The teacher did not question why I attended the piano lessons instead of my brother." She has performed her singles "I Don't Want to Be Your Friend" (2004) and "However Much Love" (2011) while playing the piano during her live television appearances and concerts. She believes playing the piano is the key to becoming a songwriter and composer. She wrote the songs "Can't Say I Love You" for Smile (2003) and "You Should Know" for Stay Alive (2011). Her songwriting in the former, according to Philippine Daily Inquirer, is "quite acceptable, but it's not particularly distinguished [...] The sentiments are worded too prosaically." She also produced her fifth studio album, Renditions of the Soul (2009).

=== Voice and timbre ===
"Through the Fire (Live)" (2005)
One song that is known for Nina's highest recorded vocal register in full chest voice, a sustained G♯5.

Nina is a lyric coloratura soprano, possessing approximately four-octave vocal range and the whistle register. Referred to as the "Soul Siren," she was recognized as one of the 10 Best Singers in the Philippines by the 2004 Tinig Awards. Later, she was ranked sixth in the list of "20 Amazing Filipina Singers" by the Female Network in 2011. Music critics shared the same opinion on Nina's vocal ability. Baby Gil of The Philippine Star described her voice as "sweet but definitely multi-octave," commenting "This is surely her strongest point and it is really a blessing to know that she can skillfully wield her vocals to conform to the demands of every song." Leonardo Belen from Manila Bulletin complimented her range and technique, saying "Her voice range always amazes people, reaching the highest notes with extreme control and with a sentimental timbre. She renders her songs with emotion and soul, thus made her the Soul Siren." Professional writer-editor Ginnie Faustino-Galgana stated "There is no doubt that Nina is one talented singer. Her vocal range is decidedly wide. Her voice itself has proven itself youthful and adaptable to any beat." Freelance writer Resty Odon said in a review, "Nina can afford to do just covers because she has a voice that's easy to love." In terms of song selection, he adds "She works the range and volume she sounds best in."

Apart from her chart-topping original songs, Nina became known for doing cover versions. She described her sound, saying "I can say that the songs I sing in my albums very much represent who I am [...] I try to make it my own even if it was done originally by another artist." She takes good care of her voice, saying "I always order Halo-halo without ice. If I want to eat ice cream, I have to let it melt first or else microwave it. I also don't eat spicy food or mint candies [...] Of course, it was hard for me [...] But you get used to it." She maintains a healthy food diet to easily recover from throat infections. She sings at least twenty songs a day for practice. In 2011, Nina was featured in a short documentary aired by South Korean network tvN Asia where she was filmed re-attending the Center for Pop Music of the Philippines for vocal training sessions.

=== Music videos and stage ===
Nina has recorded music videos with choreography, including her singles "Heaven" (2002), "Make You Mine" (2003), "I Do" (2006) and "Dance" (2011). She has incorporated dancing in her live concerts and stage performances, notably in Nina Just Wanna Have Fun (2005), Nina... The Diamond Soul Siren (2010), Update Your Status... (2012) and Nina Reborn (2013). "Staying Alive," "Only with You" and "I Came to Dance" (2011) are original songs that she performs live with synchronized dance routine and back-up dancers. Nina took up ballet classes in her early years. In 2010, she pursued ballet along with playing tennis to keep herself physically fit. In May 2011, she joined The G-Force Project dance recital, performing a burlesque dance. In 2020, she flew to South Korea to undergo K-pop sing and dance workshop.

== Public image and reception ==
Nina has been labelled "pop diva" and "whistling diva" by writers and critics for her wide vocal range, signature use of the whistle register, and status as one of the top-selling female singers in the Philippines.

Among singers of her generation, she has been recognized as a fashion icon. For three consecutive years, she was nominated for Female Style Icon of the Year in the Wave 89.1 Urban Music Awards from 2010 to 2012. She has also attended fashion events and has done ramp-modeling.

She has been considered a sex symbol by men's magazine companies. In 2005, she was included in FHM Philippines' list of 100 Sexiest Women in the World. In May 2012, she was featured in the cover of Playboy Philippines and released the behind-the-scenes footage of her photo shoot through her promotional music video, "Only with You".

=== Reception ===
Nina has been acknowledged for popularizing the acoustic phenomenon in the Philippines. According to The Philippine Star, "Nina deserves to be called as one of local music's treasures. Her album titled Nina Live! became a benchmark in acoustic recording." At the height of its success, the album's format has been adapted in the live recordings of artists including Freestyle, MYMP, Sitti, Christian Bautista, Rachelle Ann Go and Aiza Seguerra. Nina has also been considered as one of the pioneers of contemporary R&B in Pinoy pop. In addition to her musical style, she has been regarded as one of the country's top-selling female artists. Music critic Remy Umerez of Journal wrote, "Nina set the bar high for female singers of her generation with the multi-platinum success of her solo albums in the mid-2000s." In a review for All Good, Yugel Losorata of The Philippine Star opined that the album "reflects [Nina]'s mindset of thanking back the local music scene that has provided her blessings other lady acts can only dream of." Mega Philippines listed her as one of the Women to Watch in 2004. Her songs "Love Moves in Mysterious Ways", "Jealous", "I Didn't Mean to Make You Mine" and "Foolish Heart" were ranked 10th, 20th, 35th and 46th "Best Filipino Love Songs in English", respectively, based on a survey by Spinditty.

Morissette has stated that Nina's rendition of "Foolish Heart" (2002) inspired her on the use of whistle register. She also credits Nina's toned-down vocal style as it influenced her to be "steady" [sic] in terms of singing. She paid tribute to Nina in one of her recorded live performances. Regine Velasquez has cited Nina as one of her favorite artists and has performed Nina's original songs in her live shows. Sarah Geronimo has also cited Nina as one of her favorite singers, stating that she personally wanted Nina as guest act for her 2005 concert The Other Side. Katrina Velarde has performed a medley of Nina's popular songs in one of her concerts. BTS leader RM, Seventeen's DK and Loona's Chuu have mentioned Nina's songs as some of their favorites. Several Asian pop artists have covered Nina's original songs. In 2009, South Korean boy band Super Junior recorded "What If" (2003) for their album Sorry, Sorry. "Someday" (2006) has been performed by South Korean singers Jessica Jung of Girls' Generation, Krystal Jung of f(x), Urban Zakapa, Kwon Jin-ah, Lee Jin-ah, Jun Hyo-seong, Japanese singer Yoshika and Mongolian singer Khulan.

== Accolades ==
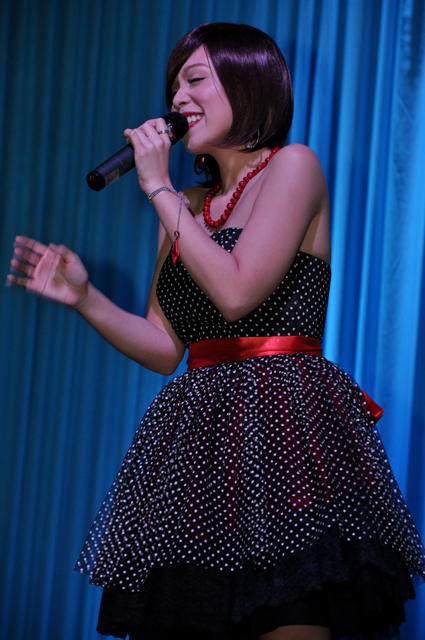
Nina performing at the Ayala Center Cebu in June 2011.

Nina has six platinum or multi-platinum and one diamond album certifications by the Philippine Association of the Record Industry (PARI) which were based from pure physical sales. She has won ten Awit Awards, two Aliw Awards, two Myx Music Awards, one MTV Pilipinas Music Award and one PMPC Star Award for Music among numerous others. Domestically, she was named as the best-selling female recording artist of 2009 by the Box Office Entertainment Awards with accumulated 100,000 record sales for the year. In addition, she was a recipient of the Elite Platinum Circle Award by the ASAP Platinum Circle Awards in 2009, and the Special Achievement Award by the Wave 89.1 Urban Music Awards in 2011.

Her album Nina Live! is the fourth best-selling certified album, best-selling live album and best-selling album of the 2000s in the Philippines, making Nina the third artist, first female, to receive a diamond certification by the PARI. She has spent a total of 37 weeks at the number-one position in Philippine charts from 2003 to 2006. Her songs "Jealous", "Foolish Heart" and "Make You Mine" topped the Philippine charts in 2003, making her the first female OPM artist to have three number-one singles on a single calendar year. Her hit single "Love Moves in Mysterious Ways" held the record for longest running number-one OPM song, spending twelve consecutive weeks atop the Philippine charts in 2005. Her single "Araw Mo" is the first original birthday song and ringtone by an OPM artist that became a moderate hit. Despite not having released new material since 2013, she was ranked at number 8 and 5 on Spotify's most-streamed female OPM artists of 2018 and 2020, respectively, with an average of 963,468 monthly listeners.

Her music videos have been regular chart-competitors in music video channels such as Myx and MTV Pilipinas. "Jealous" and "Foolish Heart" were the first and second OPM music videos to reach number-one on chart shows including the Myx Daily Top Ten and Myx Hit Chart. This makes Nina the first OPM artist to top both Myx charts. Due to the success of her music videos, she was selected in May 2004 as the third Celebrity VJ to be featured on Myx shows.

Aside from singing, she has earned recognitions through televised dance competitions. On December 2, 2007, Nina was declared Monthly Champion on ABC-5's Shall We Dance? when she performed a freestyle-jive with professional ballroom dancer Efren Ibo. On January 18, 2009, she was recognized as Daily Winner on ABS-CBN's Magpasikat, a temporary replacement after the suspension of the noontime variety show Showtime, after performing a group dance with the G-Force.

== Other activities ==
=== Philanthropy ===
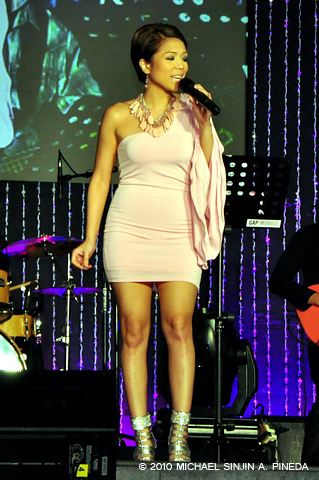
Nina performing on Think Pink, a campaign benefiting ICanServe Foundation.

In late 2003, she became part of "Biyahe Tayo", a song patterned after We Are the World which was used to promote Philippine tourism (WOW Philippines). She recorded it along with OPM pioneers including Lea Salonga, Rico Blanco, Sharon Cuneta, the APO Hiking Society and Francis Magalona. (Roxanne Barcelo was also offered to take part in the song) The following year, she was also honored as Singing Ambassador of Goodwill by the Center for Pop Music Philippines for performing for the less-fortunate institutions, fund-raising concerts and inspirational talks to students. Since 2007, she has been participating on the annual Earth Day Jam event. On April 20, 2008, she and her brother King participated on the Philippine Daily Inquirer's read-along session in celebration of Earth Month. In June 2008, she performed on the first Filipino exposition in the Middle East at the Dubai Trade Centre, which patronized Philippine-made products and brands. In July 2008, she became a representative for "Pose for PAWS," a fundraising event for the animal shelter launched by the Philippine Animal Welfare Society (PAWS). In December 2008, she performed on the fundraising dinner for Ploning entitled Plato Para Kay Ploning, after the film was submitted as Philippine entry for Best Foreign Language Film on the 81st Academy Awards. On May 29, 2009, she supported Friendster Cares, a benefit concert for the education of less-fortunate kids. In August 2009, she performed on YCONCON: Isang Araw Lang – The Sequel concert at the Araneta Coliseum, which supports Daniel Razon's "Free College Education" program.

In November 2009, Nina was one of 80 Filipino artists who recorded "Kaya Natin Ito!", a song benefiting the victims of Typhoon Ondoy. All proceeds from the sales of the song went towards the disaster relief efforts of the Philippine Red Cross and Gawad Kalinga. On June 30, 2010, she was one of the Universal Records artists who performed the song "Bagong Pilipinas" for the inauguration of Philippine President Noynoy Aquino. Later, she performed on Aquino's victory street party with various artists. On October 22, 2010, she staged a concert at The Terraces, Ayala Center Cebu entitled Think Pink. All proceeds from the event went to ICanServe, a cancer foundation. On June 5, 2011, she performed on the Tunog Wunderground Concert which encouraged people to vote for Puerto Princesa Underground River as one of the New7Wonders of Nature. On July 31, 2011, she performed on a concert in Japan entitled Moving On, which was produced by GMA Pinoy TV and IPS for the sixth anniversary of Access TV. On November 20, 2012, she participated in the Saludo fund-raising concert for soldiers' families, benefiting HERO Foundation. On November 21, 2013, she performed in the National Clean Air Month concert. On November 27, she performed on Music That Moves, a benefit concert for the survivors of Typhoon Yolanda.

On February 7, 2020, Nina held a concert in Bacolod City which benefited the disadvantaged dependents of Kalipay Negrense Foundation, Inc. On May 17, she joined the online concert ceremony of Philippine International AIDS Candlelight Memorial (IACM). On June 14, she performed on PLDT Global's Musikalayaan online concert dedicated to OFW frontliners and volunteers during the COVID-19 pandemic. On June 27, she appeared as guest judge on Center for Pop's Music of Hope, an online variety competition show dedicated to help local frontliners. Throughout 2020, she has supported fund-raising events benefiting local musicians who lost jobs during the pandemic and whose livelihoods were affected by Super Typhoon Rolly. She participated in the online concerts Musikaramay on May 26 and August 15, and We Sing as One on November 6.

=== Endorsements and media appearances ===
In June 2006, Nina became the spokesperson for Goldilocks Bakeshop and released her single "Araw Mo", a birthday song used for the promotion of Goldilocks' 40th anniversary (40 Thoughtful Years). Sales of the single entirely went to charity, the Leukemic Indigents Fund and UNICEF. Aside from Goldilocks, she has recorded TV commercials for Ellips Cologne with fellow acoustic singers Nyoy Volante, Luke Mejares, and Jimmy Bondoc–each rendering an excerpt from songs identified to them like "You're My You" (Volante), "Because of You" (Mejares) and "Let Me Be the One" (Bondoc). Her songs were also used for Colgate and Nescafé advertisements. In addition, she became the first Filipina endorser of Sennheiser microphones and was a spokesperson for Gan Advanced Osseointegration Center (GAOC). In 2007, Nina strutted onstage during "The Lion King" segment of Furry Tales fashion show. She has been part of musical variety show ASAP on ABS-CBN/Kapamilya Channel/A2Z, variety game show Wil Time Bigtime/Wowowillie on TV5, and has hosted her own weekly radio show on Wave 89.1 entitled Renditions of the Soul.

== Personal life ==
Nina began dating fellow acoustic singer Jimmy Bondoc in 2002. During their relationship, the couple acquired real estate properties in Boracay which were later sold after their break-up in 2005. Reportedly, Nina's family was not in favor of their relationship. In November 2005, she began dating fellow musician Nyoy Volante. They became close while working on the El Niño, La Niña (2004) concert series and her self-titled studio album. The couple broke up in May 2007 due to unresolved financial conflict. A year later, Nina began dating businessman Enrico "Coy" Enriquez. The two met through Dard Enriquez, Coy's brother, who became Nina's band guitarist. In November 2009, Nina announced her engagement with Enriquez. In 2015, they were secretly married after an eight-year relationship and she gave birth to a baby girl, Ysabelle Louise, on December 24, 2015, via painful normal delivery. She labored for 13 hours and decided to give birth without anaesthesia to feel the sacrifices of being a mother.

In an interview with SNN: Showbiz News Ngayon's Kris Aquino which aired in February 2009, Nina stated that she would file an estafa (fraud) case against Volante's parents, Evangeline and Oliver, for failing to settle their debts. She explained that in 2007, the couple borrowed ₱1.4 million from her. The following year, Oliver issued several checks as payment. However, some of the checks bounced. In July 2008, she entered into a compromise agreement with the couple under which Evangeline immediately paid her ₱300,000 in cash. The couple also agreed to settle the balance of ₱1.1 million in monthly installments—from August 20, 2008, to February 20, 2010. They issued her nineteen post-dated checks which were signed by Oliver. She said that she was able to encash some of the checks. However, the rest of the checks—which totaled ₱550,000—were not honored due to insufficient funds.

== Discography ==
- Heaven (2002)
- Smile (2003)
- Nina Live! (2005)
- Nina (2006) (reissued in 2007 as Nina Featuring the Hits of Barry Manilow)
- Nina Sings the Hits of Diane Warren (2008)
- Renditions of the Soul (2009)
- Stay Alive (2011)
- All Good (2013)

== Filmography ==
- Masikip sa Dibdib (2004)
- A Secret Affair (2012)
- DAD: Durugin ang Droga (2017)

== Concerts and tours ==
=== Headlining tours ===
Title	Date	Guest act(s)	Cities	Shows
Love Moves US Tour	May – Jun 2022: May 7, 2022; May 8, 2022; May 13, 2022; May 14, 2022; May 20, 2022; May 21, 2022; May 27, 2022; May 28, 2022; May 29, 2022; June 4, 2022; June 5, 2022; June 10, 2022; June 12, 2022; June 17, 2022; June 18, 2022; June 25, 2022	Luke Mejares	16 cities: Skokie, Illinois; McLean, Virginia; Cedar Rapids, Iowa; Jersey City, New Jersey; Torrance, California; San Jose, California; Houston, Texas; Dallas, Texas; San Antonio, Texas; Portland, Oregon; Las Vegas, Nevada; West Covina, California; Denver, Colorado; Woodside, New York; Saxapahaw, North Carolina; Los Angeles, California	16
Love Moves US Tour 2023	Mar – Apr 2023: March 10, 2023; March 11, 2023; March 12, 2023; March 17, 2023; March 18, 2023; March 24, 2023; March 25, 2023; March 26, 2023; March 31, 2023; April 1, 2023	Kris Lawrence	10 cities: San Francisco, California; Sacramento, California; Cerritos, California; Harlingen, Texas; Corpus Christi, Texas; Seattle, Washington; San Diego, California; West Covina, California; Downtown Los Angeles; Las Vegas, Nevada	10
Love Moves Canada Tour 2023	Apr 2023: April 9, 2023; April 14, 2023; April 15, 2023; April 21, 2023; April 23, 2023; April 28, 2023	Luke Mejares	6 cities: Halifax; Toronto; Vancouver; Calgary; Edmonton; Winnipeg	6
Nina Live Australian Tour	Feb 2025: February 14, 2025; February 16, 2025; February 21, 2025	none	3 cities: Sydney; Melbourne; Perth	3
Love Moves US Tour 2025	Jun – Aug 2025: June 27, 2025; June 28, 2025; July 5, 2025; July 11, 2025; July 12, 2025; July 18, 2025; July 19, 2025; July 25, 2025; July 26, 2025; August 1, 2025; August 2, 2025	Kris Lawrence	10 cities: Arizona City, Arizona; Las Vegas, Nevada; San Diego, California; Dallas, Texas; Houston, Texas; San Francisco, California; Sacramento, California; Los Angeles, California; San Diego, California; Long Beach, California; West Covina, California	11

=== Co-headlining tours ===
Title	Date	Associated act(s)	Cities	Shows
So Much in Love Tour	Feb – Mar 2006: February 14, 2006; March 4, 2006; March 10, 2006	Nyoy Volante	3 cities: Edsa Shangri-La, Manila; Glendale, California; San Francisco, California	3
ASAP Sessionistas Live Tour	Aug 2009 – Feb 2010: August 28, 2009; October 23, 2009; November 6, 2009 — November 15, 2009; February 11, 2010	Aiza Seguerra, Duncan Ramos, MYMP, Richard Poon, Sitti	7 cities: Araneta Coliseum, Manila; Waterfront Cebu City; Los Angeles, California; San Jose, California; Washington, DC; New York City; Batangas City	7
ASAP Sessionistas 20.11 Tour	Feb – Sep 2011: February 5, 2011; August 26, 2011 — September 5, 2011	Aiza Seguerra, Duncan Ramos, Juris, Princess, Richard Poon, Sitti	7 cities: Araneta Coliseum, Manila; Los Angeles, California; Chicago, Illinois; New York City; Las Vegas, Nevada; Reno, Nevada; Alaska	7
Heart and Soul 3.0 - US Tour	Feb 2019: February 22, 2019; February 24, 2019	David Pomeranz, Jay R	2 cities: Temecula, California; Los Angeles, California	2

=== Concert residencies ===
Title	Date	Guest act(s)	Venue	Shows
El Niño, La Niña (with Nyoy Volante)	August 2004	none	Music Museum	5
Very Manilow	June 2006	Christian Bautista, Jed Madela, Nyoy Volante, Troy Montero	Music Museum	8
Nina... Gold (Precious OPM Hits)	November 2006	Gary Granada, Noel Cabangon, Nonoy Zuñiga, Nyoy Volante	Music Museum	8

=== Notable concerts ===
As headlining act

Title	Date	Associated album(s)	Venue
Heaven Sent	2003	Heaven	Music Museum
Strings from the Heart	February 14, 2004	Smile	Folk Arts Theater
Nina Just Wanna Have Fun	May 25, 2005 – May 26, 2005	Nina Live!	Music Museum
Nina Live! The Concert	October 1, 2005	Nina Live!	Araneta Coliseum
Nina: Beyond Limits	April 8, 2006	none	SM Megamall Centerstage
All That Glitters	August 19, 2006	Nina	Bagaberde, Roxas Blvd
Nina... The Diamond Soul Siren	March 5, 2010 – March 6, 2010	Nina Sings the Hits of Diane Warren; Renditions of the Soul	Music Museum
Update Your Status...	February 13, 2012	Stay Alive	Music Museum
Timeless... Tribute to a Diva	April 14, 2012	none	Music Museum
Nina Reborn	January 25, 2013	All Good	Music Museum
Only Nina	November 8, 2023	none	Samsung Hall
Only Nina	February 9, 2024	none	Waterfront Cebu City Hotel & Casino
Love, Nina	October 30, 2024	none	The Theatre at Solaire
Love Matters	February 7, 2025	none	New Frontier Theater

As co-headlining act

Title	Date	Associated act(s)	Venue
Pop Ko 'To! The All-Star, All-Hits	November 13, 2004	Artstrong, Christian Bautista, Dice & K9, Kitchie Nadal, Paolo Santos, Pido, Thor	Folk Arts Theater
Love2Love2Love	February 12, 2010	Freestyle, Side A	Araneta Coliseum
#LoveThrowback	February 12, 2016	Gino Padilla, Marco Sison, Rico J. Puno, Roselle Nava	PICC
Versions and Verses	July 1, 2016	Joey G.	Music Museum
#LoveThrowback2	February 14, 2017, May 27, 2017	Ariel Rivera, Christian Bautista, Hajji Alejandro, Jinky Vidal, Joey G.	PICC
Versions and Verses - The Repeat	October 12, 2017	Joey G.	Music Museum
Love, Soul & Magic	October 28, 2018	David Pomeranz, Joey G.	Club Regent, Winnipeg

=== Online concerts ===
Title	Date	Streaming channel	Notes
Nina Live! 2020	April 6, 2020	Facebook Live	Free viewing
Nina Live! The Birthday Virtual Concert	November 1, 2020	KTX.ph	
Nina Live! 2021	April 5, 2021	Facebook Live	Free viewing
Nina Live: The Divas Edition	November 30, 2021; December 1, 2021	KTX.ph	

== Notes ==
Awards and achievements
Preceded by Karylle	MTV Pilipinas Award for Favorite New Artist; 2003	Succeeded by Bamboo
