= SM City Baguio =

Shopping mall in Baguio, Philippines

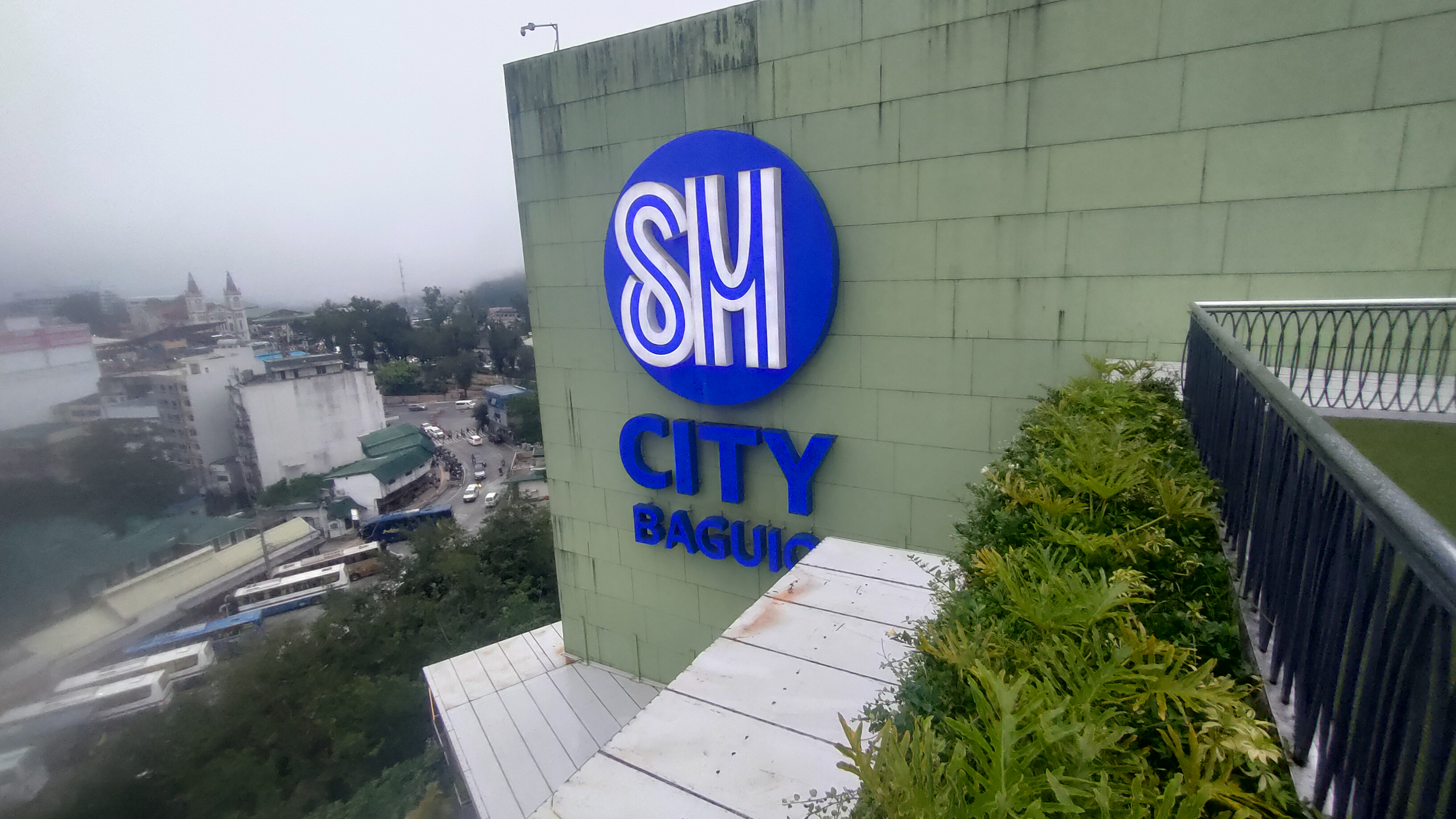
- Location: Baguio, Philippines
- Coordinates: 16°24′32″N 120°35′57″E
- Address: Luneta Hill, Upper Session Road
- Opened: November 21, 2003; 22 years ago
- Developer: SM Prime Holdings
- Manager: SM Prime Holdings
- Architect: Jose Siao Ling and Associates
- Num. of stores: 400+ (as of 2021)
- Num. of anchor tenants: 10
- Floor area: 196,000 m^{2} (2,110,000 sq ft)
- Floors: Main Mall: 6 North Terraces: 2 Sunset Terraces: 4 Carpark Annex: 5 SM Cyber Baguio Building: 5 SM Fiesta Strip: 2 SM Baguio Power Station Building: 1
- Parking: 3000+ (as of 2021)
- Website: SM City Baguio

SM City Baguio is the 22nd largest shopping mall in the Philippines. At a floor area of 196,000 m^{2} (2,110,000 sq ft), it is the largest shopping complex in Northern Luzon. The entire SM City Baguio complex stands on a land area of 80,000 m^{2} (860,000 sq ft) on Luneta Hill on top of Session Road overlooking historic Burnham Park and opposite Baguio's City Hall which is situated on a northern hill.

The mall was formally opened on November 21, 2003. It is also the first SM Supermall which does not use an air-conditioning system upon its completion, other than the SM Mall of Asia, that make use of natural lighting and which does not have air conditioning in common areas. It is also the only SM Supermall that opens all-year round, including the entire Holy Week. The site of the mall was once occupied by The Historic Pines Hotel until it burned down in 1984.

== History ==
=== Acquisition of Luneta Hill ===
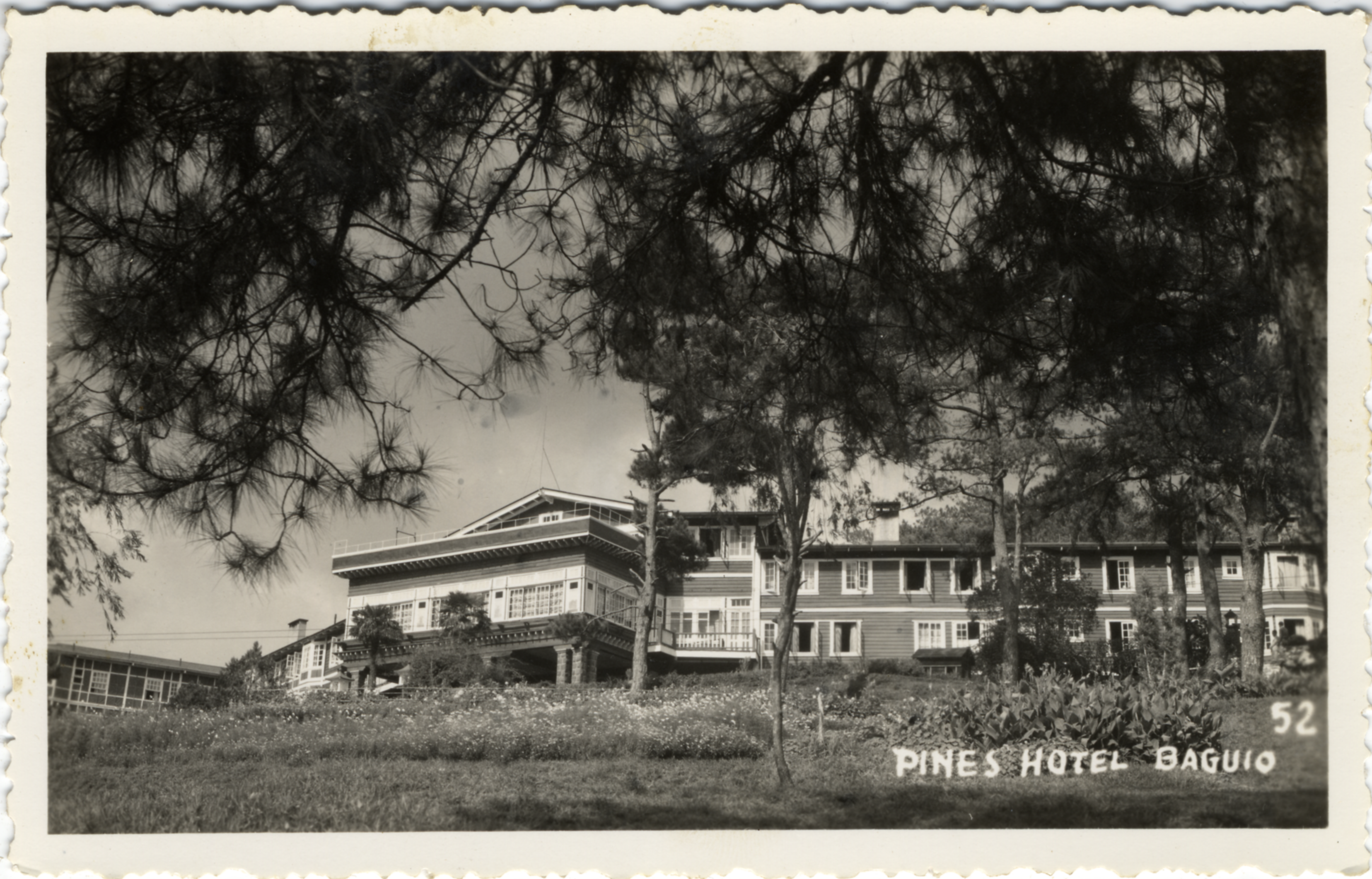
Pines Hotel, circa 1930

The prime location on Luneta Hill, now home to SM City Baguio, was once the site of the Pines Hotel, owned by Resort Hotel Corporation. In 1988, a significant turning point occurred when SM, under the leadership of Henry Sy, successfully won an auction held by the Development Bank of the Philippines (DBP) for this coveted lot. The reported acquisition price was a mere ₱2,000 per square meter, a figure that would later become a point of contention.

The DBP had foreclosed on the property in 1984, a few years after the Pines Hotel building had been tragically destroyed by fire. This foreclosure stemmed from Resort Hotel's default on a substantial ₱114 million loan from businessman Rodolfo Cuenca, for which the Pines Hotel property, along with the Taal Vista and Mindanao Hotel in Cagayan de Oro, had been mortgaged.

The sale to SM did not proceed without legal challenges. In 1990, both Rodolfo Cuenca of Resort Hotel and John Gokongwei of Robinsons Investment Corporation initiated legal action against the DBP in an attempt to block the transaction. The controversy further escalated in 1992 when Councilor Frederico Mandapat filed a resolution formally objecting to the sale, explicitly referencing the objections raised by Cuenca and Gokongwei's respective companies.

Despite these challenges, the Department of Environment and Natural Resources (DENR) proceeded with processing the sale. Councilor Mandapat, however, continued to press the city's claim, asserting that a 2,000-square-meter portion (approximately 22,000 sq ft) of the lot was rightfully city property, as it had been the original site of a city library.

Conversely, in early 1993, Baguio Representative Bernardo Vergara publicly expressed his support for the potential construction of a new shopping mall and hotel complex by Sy's Shoemart Group, signaling a division in local opinion regarding the development.

=== Conceptualization ===
The vision for an SM Supermall in Baguio was initially conceived as early as 1995, with plans unveiled by SM magnate Henry Sy himself, alongside then-President Fidel V. Ramos. Despite this high-profile launch, the project remained dormant for several years, with active development not resuming until April 2001.

During this hiatus, Sy reportedly placed the Baguio plan on hold, choosing instead to prioritize business ventures in Cebu City. By 2001, there were even reports suggesting a change in direction, with Sy potentially pursuing the construction of a hotel rather than a full-fledged shopping mall on the site.

Sy's original, broader scheme involved building a hotel on the lot he had previously acquired— the former site of the Pines Hotel— and a separate shopping mall on an open lot owned by the Government Service Insurance System (GSIS). These two facilities were envisioned to be seamlessly connected by a 50-meter (160 ft) covered overpass. However, Sy ultimately did not push through with his bid to acquire the GSIS-owned lot, leading to a significant alteration of the initial grand design.

=== Construction and grand opening ===
SM City Baguio, as seen from Baguio Athletic Bowl (2004)

Despite ongoing disputes concerning the ownership and status of the Luneta Hill lot, construction for what would become SM City Baguio commenced in 2001.

Contrary to earlier reports suggesting a hotel development, a full-fledged shopping mall was ultimately built on the site formerly occupied by the Pines Hotel.

After two years of development, SM City Baguio officially opened its doors to the public on November 21, 2003, marking a significant addition to Baguio's commercial landscape and the SM Supermalls portfolio.

== Facilities ==
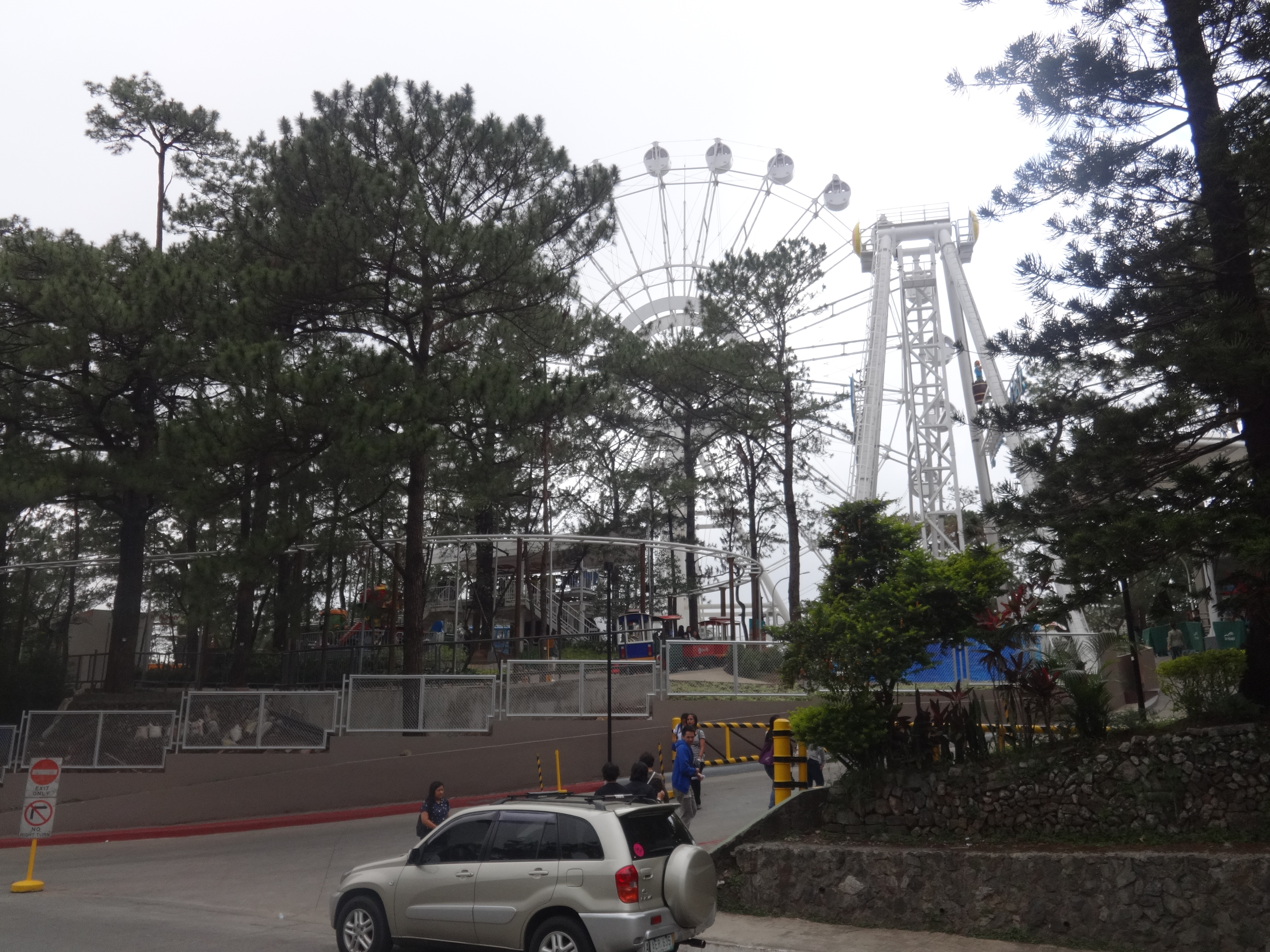
Sky Ranch Baguio

The Sunset Terraces, December 2019

The mall features an SM Supermarket on the lower ground level, and four cinemas and Cyberzone on the 3rd level. The Department of Foreign Affairs Consular Office (DFA CO) Baguio, the first and only passport office in the Cordillera Administrative Region, is located at the mall's upper basement level.

SM City Baguio also has Sky Ranch on a 5,500 m^{2} (59,000 sq ft) lot beside the mall, along Rambakan Drive. It opened on November 8, 2018, with numerous attractions such as a Viking ride, a carousel, and a drop tower. One notable attraction is the Baguio Eye which is a 45-meter (148 ft) diameter Ferris wheel that stands 50 meters (160 ft) tall and carrying 24 air-conditioned gondolas.

Other facilities include:

- SM Cyber Baguio, 5 Floors and Houses Foundever, ThoughtFocus, Benguet Laboratories, Krispy Kreme and a Covered Parking Facility. It is located Along Harrison Road (Near Sunshine Park).
- SM Fiesta Strip, 2 Floors and Houses Teleperformance. It is Along Harrison Road (In Front of Sunshine Park).
- SM Power Station Building, located at the back of SM Cyber Baguio Building 1 and Beside Sky Ranch Baguio.
- North Terrace, which opened of May 20, 2019, located in front of the mall's Supermarket Entrance.
- Carpark Annex, an expanded parking facility with more than 600 slots across five levels, opened on October 16, 2019. The entrance is located along Governor Pack Road.
- Sunset Terraces, with its Lower Ground and Upper Ground levels opening on December 14, 2019, and its 2nd level opening on February 15, 2020.
- The Sky Terrace, the latest attraction at SM opened on October 2, 2020. Originally scheduled to open in May 2020, it was postponed due to the COVID-19 pandemic.

== Architecture and design ==
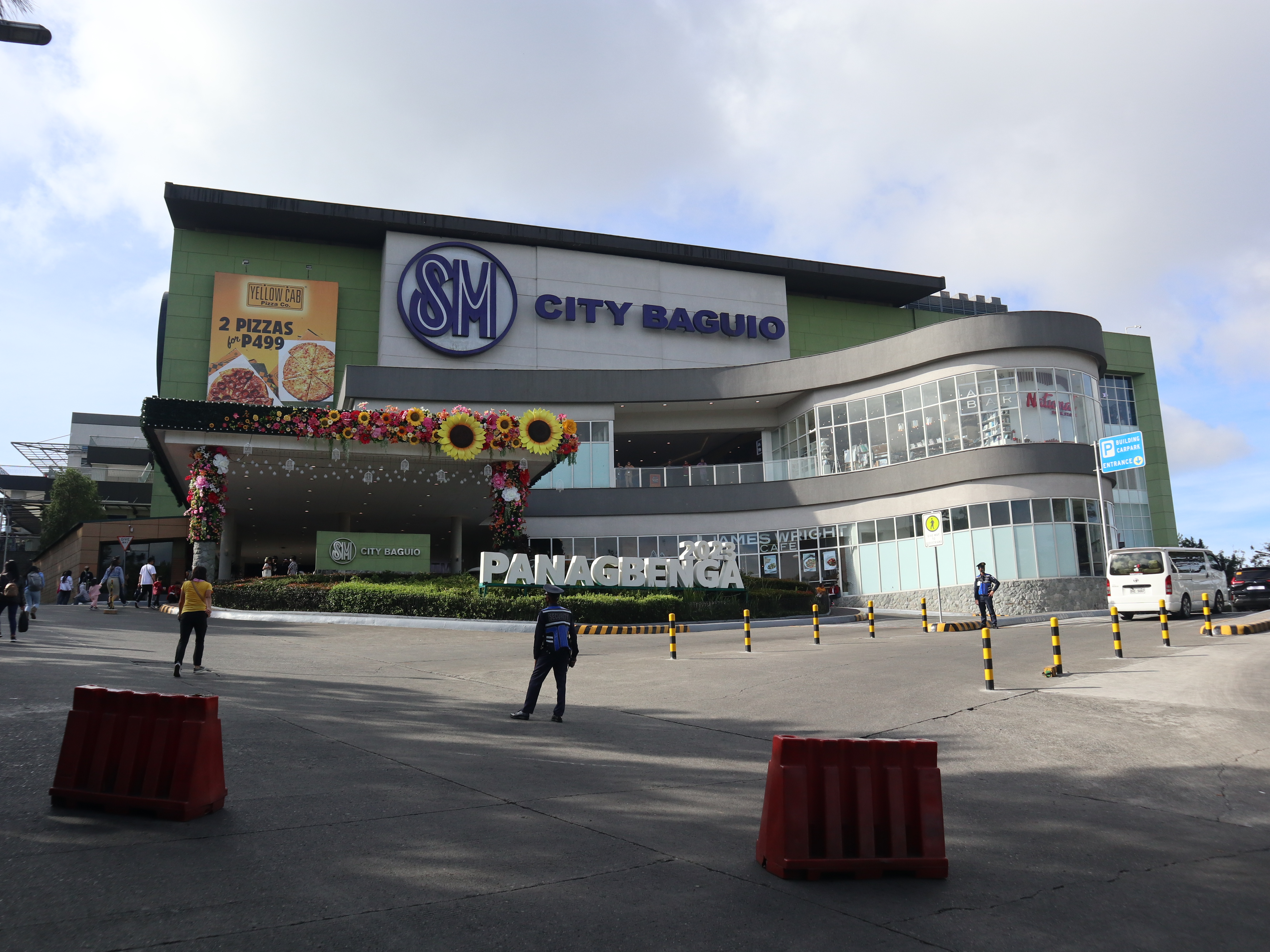
SM City Baguio front facade

The mall was inspired by Cordilleran design, such as the veranda modelled after the Banaue Rice Terraces. Design International, a foreign-based firm served as design consultants, Jose Siao Ling and Associates were the architecture firm behind the mall. New Golden City serves as general contractors while DA Abcede and Associates with SM's own engineering group were also involved in the project. Its atrium is also for natural ventilation and the mall utilizes recycled water. The mall stands on a 79,763 square meters (858,560 sq ft) lot. Upon its opening, it six levels with 106,231 square metres (1,143,460 sq ft) of retail space and parking slots for 800 vehicles.

== Controversies ==
On January 20, 2012, over 5,000 people protested on Session Road against SM City Baguio's expansion, specifically targeting the planned removal of over 100 pine trees on Luneta Hill for a multi-level parking lot and entertainment plaza. This protest was dubbed "Occupy SM Baguio."

In April 2012, SM City Baguio workers began earth-balling trees around 10:00 p.m. PHT on April 9, with protesters reporting about eight trees uprooted for mall expansion.

Multisectoral groups joined the protest and signed an online petition against the Department of Environment and Natural Resources' permit allowing the SM Group to cut or earthball pine trees. An edited image, parodying SM's tagline with "We Cut it All For You!" using a scene from The Lord of the Rings: The Two Towers, also circulated.

On April 13, 2012, environmental activists "occupied" SM City North EDSA, but were violently dispersed. Kalikasan Partylist condemned the mall guards' actions, which resulted in a protester's cellphone and sound system being damaged, and some protesters suffering minor injuries. The sound system had been playing Lighters by Bad Meets Evil featuring Bruno Mars.

On the same day, protesters held a lightning rally at SM Megamall, with some chanting "Don't cut the trees!" The rally began as a silent action, with protesters forming messages like "Leave me alone, I'm pine!" and "Cut your greed, not the trees!" Mall guards escorted them out, detaining two temporarily before their release.

Sting moved his December 9, 2012, Back to Bass Tour concert from the Mall of Asia Arena in Pasay to the Araneta Coliseum in Quezon City due to environmental concerns. He received a letter from Minnesota-based lawyer Cheryl L. Daytec-Yangot, a member of the National Union of People's Lawyers, urging the move. The letter highlighted an online petition against the SM Group, owner of the MOA Arena, which was facing legal action over plans to cut 182 mature pine trees for a mall expansion.

In April 2012, the environmental group Cordillera Global Network (CGN) secured a temporary restraining order against tree cutting, which lasted until December 2014. The Court of Appeals dismissed CGN's petition after it failed to prove permit irregularities. This allowed SM to resume construction, cutting 60 more trees on January 17, 2015.

On March 24, 2015, the Supreme Court issued a temporary restraining order on tree cutting activities, but not other parts of the mall expansion. On April 10, 2019, the Court permanently banned SM from cutting or earth-balling trees at Luneta Hill.

| Preceded by SM City Lucena | 16th SM Supermall; 2003 | Succeeded by SM City Marilao |
