= List of songs recorded by Kyla =

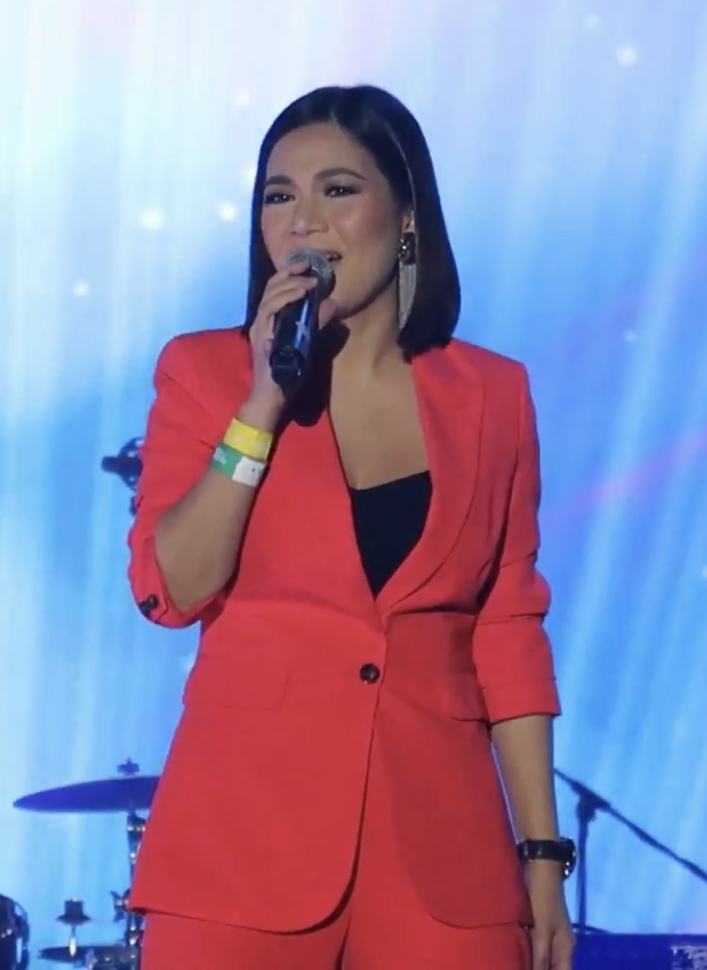
Kyla performing at the Dubai World Trade Centre in 2018

Filipino singer Kyla has recorded material for nine studio albums and one extended play (EP). She has also collaborated with other artists on duets and featured songs on their respective albums. After signing a record deal with EMI Philippines in 2000, Kyla began to work with producer Chito Ilacad and songwriter Arnie Mendaros, who wrote all of the songs on her debut studio album, Way to Your Heart, which was released later that year. It included the single "Hanggang Ngayon", whose accompanying music video won the International Viewer's Choice Awards for Southeast Asia at the 2001 MTV Video Music Awards. She continued to collaborate with Mendaros on her eponymous second album, which was released in 2002. She was the sole writer of the songs "I'm Into You" and "This Day".

Kyla's third studio album, I Will Be There, was released in May 2003. The title track was written by Ogie Alcasid. The album also featured the song "Flexin", a collaboration with English boy band Blue. She released her fourth studio album, Not Your Ordinary Girl, in October 2004. The lead single, "Human Nature", was a cover of Michael Jackson's 1983 R&B hit. Keith Martin wrote the tracks "Because of You", "Only For You", "Someone To Love", and "When I'm With You", while Jay R and Jimmy Martinez composed the album's title track and the song "Making Me Crazy". Kyla co-wrote the title track of her fifth studio album, Beautiful Days, which was released in 2006. She reunited with Mendaros on the single "Nasaan Ka Na", but also worked with new writers and producers for the project.

Kyla's next two releases—Heartfelt (2007) and Heart 2 Heart (2008)—were cover albums, both of which have since been certified platinum by the Philippine Association of the Record Industry. In 2010, she released her eighth studio album, Private Affair. The lead single, "Don't Tie Me Down", was co-written by Kyla with Jay R, Jimmy Martinez, Billy Crawford, and Kris Lawrence. The album included a remake of the Bee Gees's "How Deep Is Your Love" (2010). She released her debut EP, Journey, in May 2014. One of its tracks, "My Heart", was written by Brian McKnight for Kyla's wedding to basketball player Rich Alvarez in 2011, and was later re-recorded as a duet with McKnight. In December 2016, she signed with Star Music and released her ninth studio album, The Queen of R&B, two years later. She collaborated with other artists, including Yeng Constantino, Jay Durias, and Iñigo Pascual. She has contributed songs to soundtracks: "Even the Nights Are Better" for Since I Found You, "Mahal Ko O Mahal Ako" for Nasaan Ka Nang Kailangan Kita, and "Init sa Lamig" for The Broken Marriage Vow.

== Songs ==
Key
†	Indicates single release
#	Indicates promotional single release

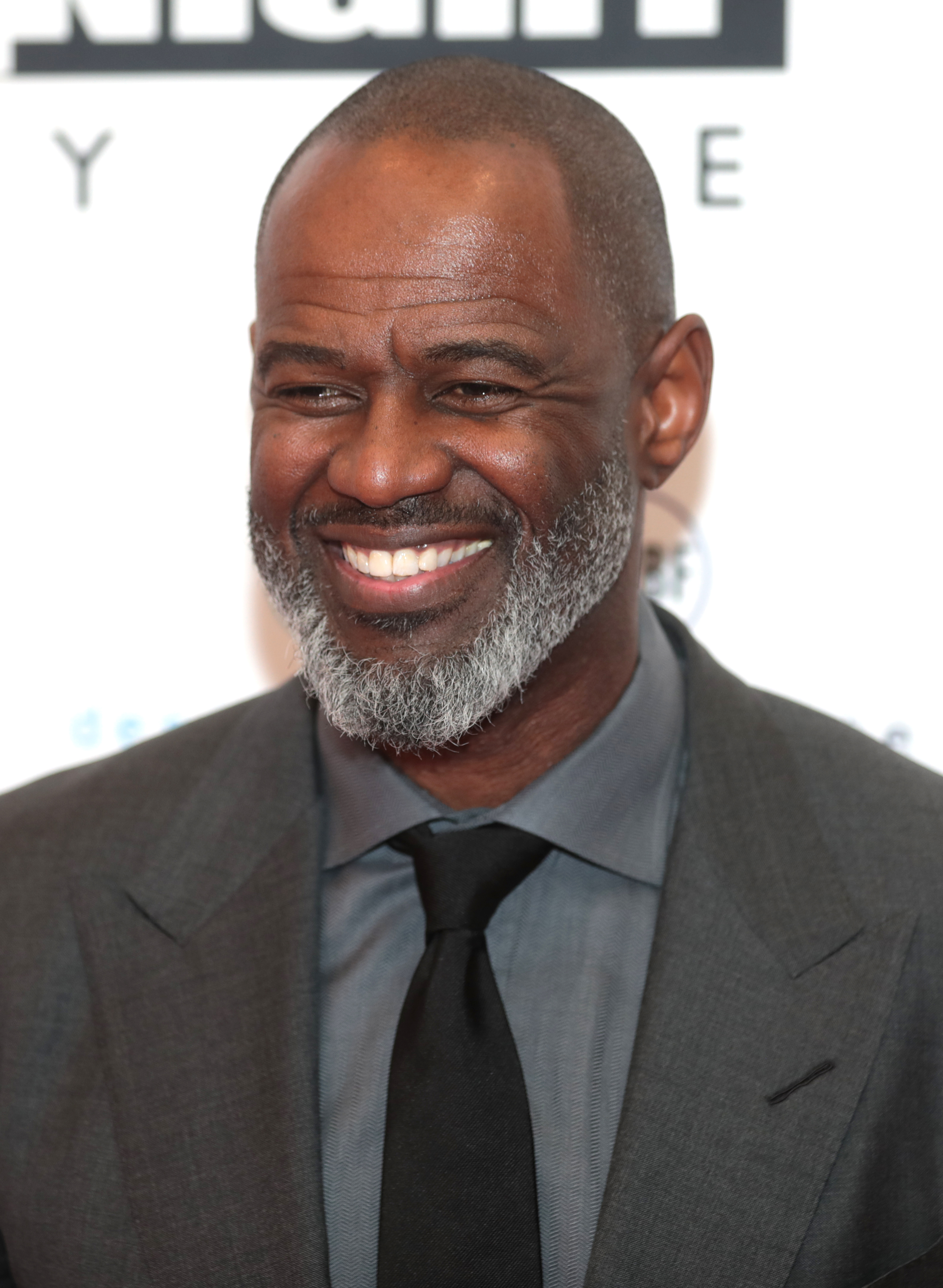
Brian McKnight wrote the track "My Heart" for Kyla's wedding to Rich Alvarez.

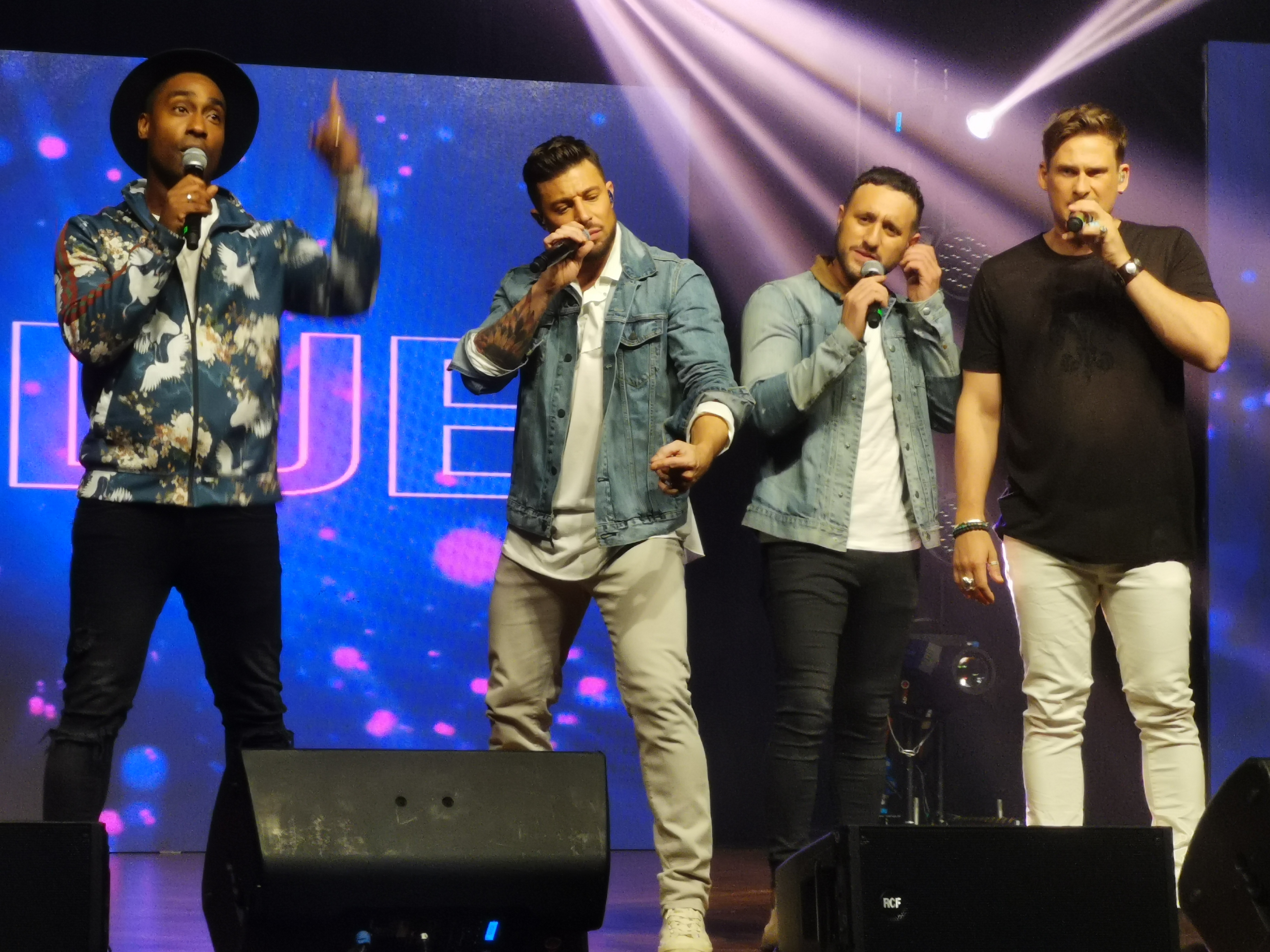
Kyla collaborated with English boy band Blue on the song "Flexin".

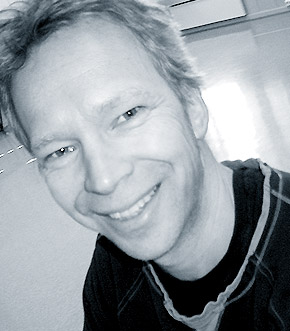
Fra Lippo Lippi lead singer Per Øystein Sørensen and Kyla recorded "Wish We Were Two" for his album In a Brilliant White.

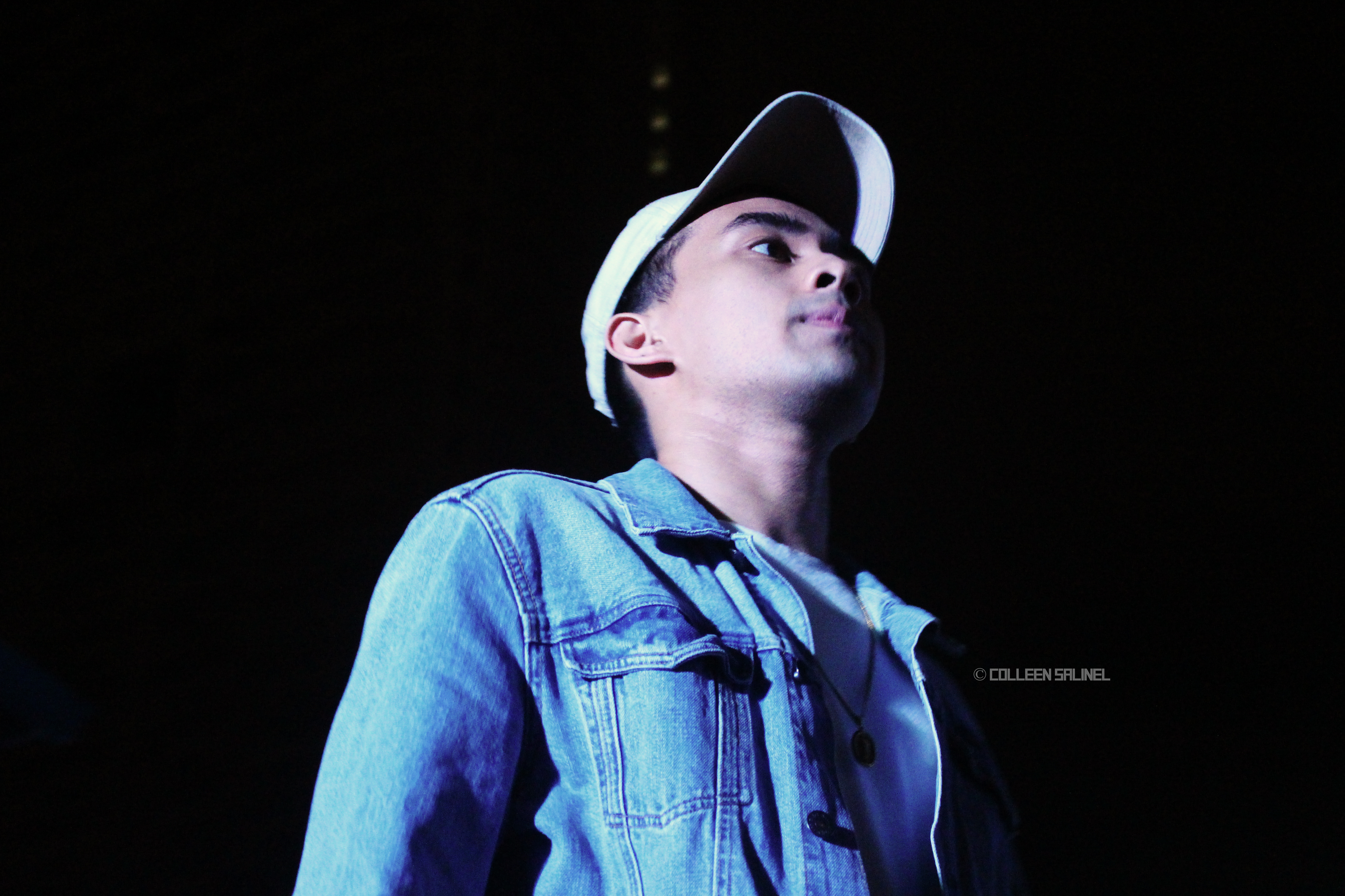
Kyla is featured on rapper Young JV's single "Back At Home".

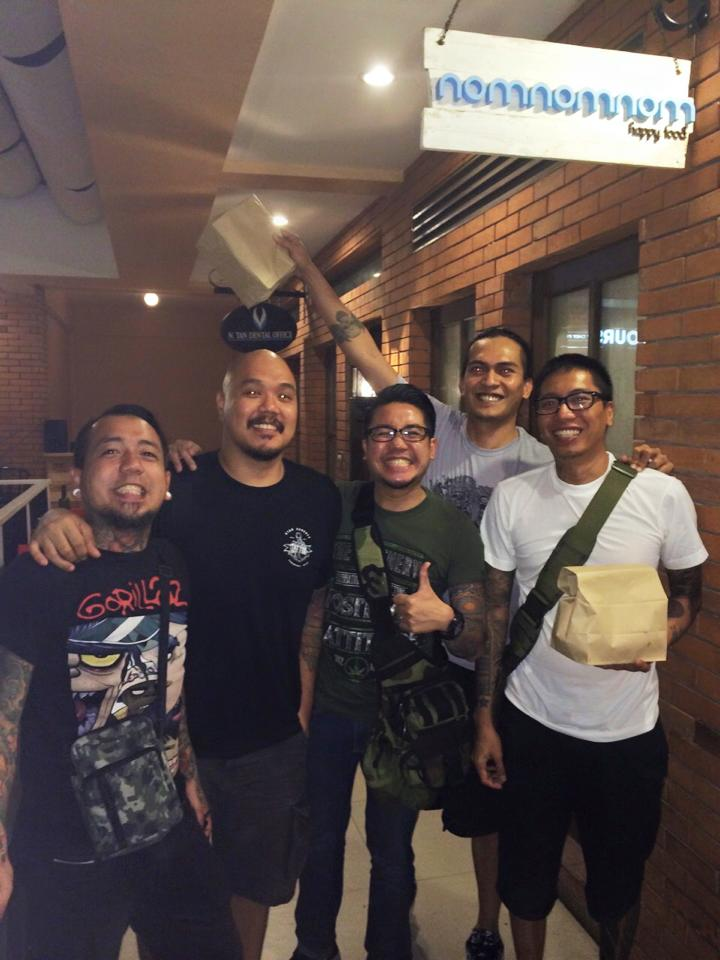
Rock band Kamikazee collaborated with Kyla on the song "Huling Sayaw".

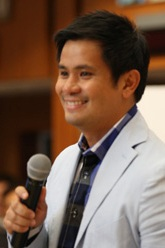
Ogie Alcasid wrote the title track for the album I Will Be There.

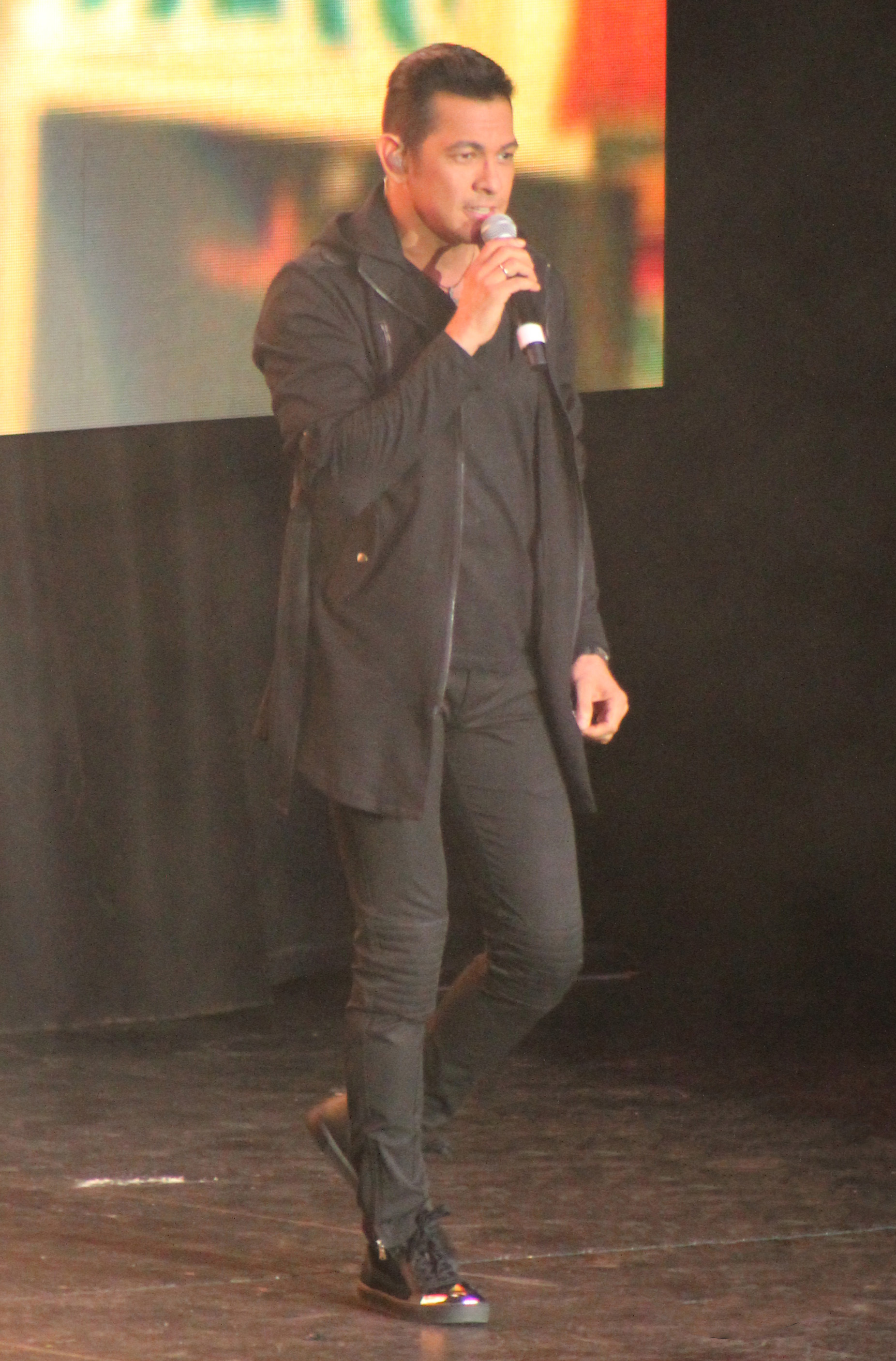
Gary Valenciano and Kyla recorded the singles "Sana Maulit Muli" and "Can We Just Stop and Talk Awhile".

Name of song, credited artist(s), writer(s), originating album, and year of release
Song	Artist(s)	Writer(s)	Album	Year	Ref.
"All I Need Is You"	Kyla	Arnie Mendaros	Way to Your Heart	2000	
"Always and Forever"	Kyla	Rod Temperton	Heartfelt	2007	
"Always On Time"	Kyla	Jonathan Manalo	I Will Be There	2003	
"Atin ang Walang Hanggan" †	Kyla	Jungee Marcelo	Journey	2014	
"Back At Home"	Young JV (featuring Kyla)	Young JV	Ready or Not	2009	
"Back in Time" †	Kyla (featuring Jay R)	Jay R	Heart 2 Heart	2008	
"Bakit Ikaw Pa"	Kyla	Arnie Mendaros	Kyla	2002	
"Bakit Wala Ka Pa"	Kyla	Arnie Mendaros	I Will Be There	2003	
"Beautiful Days" †	Kyla	Kyla; Jonathan Manalo	Beautiful Days	2006	
"Because of You" †	Kyla	Keith Martin	Not Your Ordinary Girl	2004	
"Because You Loved Me"	Kyla and Jona Viray	Diane Warren	Life Songs: MMK 25 Commemorative Album	2016	
"Blind"	Kyla	Arnie Mendaros	Way to Your Heart	2000	
"Bounce" †	Kyla (featuring Razor Ray)	Jamir Garcia	I Will Be There	2003	
"Bring It On" †	Kyla	Arnie Mendaros	Way to Your Heart	2000	
"Broken Hearted"	Kyla	Keith Crouch; Kipper Jones	Heartfelt	2007	
"Bus Stop"	Kyla	Graham Gouldman	Heart 2 Heart	2008	
"Buti Na Lang	Kyla	Jonathan Manalo	Not Your Ordinary Girl	2004	
"Camouflage"	Kyla	Yosha Honasan; Karel Honasan	Private Affair	2010	
"Can We Just Stop and Talk Awhile" †	Gary Valenciano and Kyla	Jose Mari Chan	One & One	2002	
"Cupid"	Kyla	Daron Jones; Marvin Scandrick; Michael Keith	Beautiful Days	2006	
"Dagli na Lang"	Kyla	Francis Louis Salazar	Private Affair	2010	
"Doin' Just Fine"	Kyla	Shawn Stockman	Beautiful Days	2006	
"Dito Na Lang" †	Kyla	Francis Kiko Salazar	Journey	2014	
"Don't Tell Me Don't"	Erik Santos (featuring Kyla)	Jonathan Manalo	Champion Reborn	2015	
"Don't Tie Me Down" †	Kyla	Kyla; Jay R Billy Crawford; Kris Lawrence; Jimmy Marquez	Private Affair	2010	
"Drive"	Kyla	Ric Ocasek	Heart 2 Heart	2008	
"Even the Nights Are Better" #	Kyla	J. L. Wallace; Kenneth Bell; Terry Skinner	None (Note: Kyla recorded "Even the Nights Are Better" as the main theme song for the television series Since I Found You in 2018.)	2018	
"Feel"	Kyla	Carstein Shack; Kenneth Karin; Tamara Savage	Beautiful Days	2006	
"Fix You & Me" †	Kyla	Jonathan Manalo; Zadon	The Queen of R&B	2018	
"Flexin" †	Kyla (featuring Blue)	Simon Webbe; David Dawood; Joe Belmaati; Mich Hansen	I Will Be There	2003	
"For You"	Kyla	Kenny Lerum	Heartfelt	2007	
"Grown-Up Christmas List"	Kyla	David Foster; Linda Thompson-Jenner; Amy Grant	Heart 2 Heart	2008	
"Hanggang Ngayon" †	Kyla	Arnie Mendaros	Way to Your Heart	2000	
"Hanggang Wakas"	Kyla (featuring Hazami)	Hazami	Essence of Soul	2010	
"Heart To Heart" †	Kyla	David Foster; Kenny Loggins; Michael McDonald	Heart 2 Heart	2008	
"Here I Stand"	Kyla	Lee Andre Katindoy	I Will Be There	2003	
"Hindi Mo Ba Alam	Kyla (featuring PKSO)	Paul Sirate; 7 Shots of Wisdom	Not Your Ordinary Girl	2004	
"Home"	Kyla	Brian McKnight	Heartfelt	2007	
"How Am I Gonna Tell"	Kyla	Kyla	Beautiful Days	2006	
"How Deep Is Your Love" †	Kyla	Barry Gibb; Robin Gibb; Maurice Gibb	Private Affair	2010	
"How Do You Keep the Music Playing?"	Martin Nievera (featuring Kyla)	Michel Legrand; Alan Bergman; Marilyn Bergman	As Always	2010	
"Huling Muli"	Kyla	Jungee Marcelo	The Queen of R&B	2018	
"Huling Sayaw" †	Kamikazee (featuring Kyla)	Kamikazee	Romantico	2012	
"Human Nature" †	Kyla	John Bettis; Steve Porcaro	Not Your Ordinary Girl	2004	
"The Hurt I'd Go Through"	Kyla	Aliyah Parks; Keith Martin	Beautiful Days	2006	
"I Am Changing"	Kyla	Tom Eyen; Henry Krieger	My Very Best	2015	
"I Don't Have the Heart"	Kyla	Alan Rich; Jud Friedman	Heartfelt	2007	
"I Can't Tell You Why"	Kyla	Glenn Frey; Don Henley; Timothy B. Schmit	Heart 2 Heart	2008	
"I Don't Want You to Go" †	Kyla	Dori Caymmi; Carlo Cesar Pinheiro	Heartfelt	2007	
"I Feel For You" †	Kyla	Edwin Marollano	Kyla	2002	
"I Got This"	Kyla	Kyla; Yosha Honasan	Journey	2014	
"I Miss You"	Kyla	Lynn Malsby	Heart 2 Heart	2008	
"I Miss You So Much"	Kyla	Babyface; Daryl Simmons	Heartfelt	2007	
"I Wanna Get Close" †	Freestyle and Kyla	Top Suzara	My First Romance	2003	
"I Will Be There" †	Kyla	Ogie Alcasid	I Will Be There	2003	
"I Will Find You"	Kyla	Jamir Garcia	I Will Be There	2003	
"I Wish I Wasn't"	Kyla	Wright James Quenton; Harris James Samuel; Lewis Terry Steven	Beautiful Days	2006	
"I Wish You Love" †	Kyla	Greg Caro	Beautiful Days	2006	
"Ibalik Ang Panahon"	Kyla	Arnie Mendaros	Kyla	2002	
"If I Were You" †	Kyla	Shep Crawford; Stacy Dove Daniels; S.T. Jones	Heartfelt	2007	
"If The Feeling Is Gone" †	Kyla	Jimmy Borja	Not Your Ordinary Girl	2004	
"Ikaw Pa Rin"	Kyla	Arnie Mendaros	Kyla	2002	
"I'll Be Over You"	Kyla	Randy Goodrum; Steve Lukather	Heart 2 Heart	2008	
"I'll Never Give Up"	Kyla	Amy Holland; Jeff Day	Heart 2 Heart	2008	
"I'm All Yours	Kyla	Rachel Lampa; Paige Lewis; Natalie Larue; Phillip Larue	Not Your Ordinary Girl	2004	
"I'm Into You"	Kyla	Kyla	Kyla	2002	
"Indah Cinta Kita"	Joeniar Arief (featuring Kyla)	Joeniar Arief	None (Note: "Indah Cinta Kita" was released as a non-album single in 2011.)	2011	
"Init sa Lamig" #	Kyla	Daryl Ong	None (Note: Kyla recorded "Init sa Lamig" as the main theme song for the television series The Broken Marriage Vow in 2022.)	2022	
"It's Over Now" †	Kyla	Joey Albert; Louie Ocampo; Janice de Belen	Heartfelt	2007	
"It's All About Us"	Kyla	Francis Louis Salazar	Private Affair	2010	
"Journey"	Kyla	Kyla; Jay R Kettle Mata	Journey	2014	
"Kababata" #	Kyla and Kritiko	John Michael Edixon	None (Note: Kyla and Kritiko recorded "Kababata" as an entry for the 2018 Himig Handog songwriting competition.)	2018	
"Keep the Faith"	Kyla	Moby Aragones	Private Affair	2010	
"Kunwa-Kunwari Lang" †	Kyla	Jungee Marcelo; Francis Kiko Salazar	Journey	2014	
"Last Chance"	Kyla	Mariah Carey; Mark Rooney	Heartfelt	2007	
"Let Go"	Kyla	Lee Andre Katindoy	I Will Be There	2003	
"Let The Love Begin" # (Note: "Let The Love Begin" was released as the main theme song for the film Let the Love Begin in 2005.)	Kyla (featuring Jerome John Hughes)	Gloria Sklerov; Lennie Macaluso	Not Your Ordinary Girl	2004	
"Let You Go"	Kyla (featuring Razor Ray)	Jamir Garcia	I Will Be There	2003	
"Listen"	Kyla	Christine Bendebel	Private Affair	2010	
"Lost in Paradise"	Kyla	Arnie Mendaros	Way to Your Heart	2000	
"Love Is"	Kyla	Duncan Hines; Latavia Horton; Keith Martin	Beautiful Days	2006	
"Love on a Two-Way Street"	Kyla	Bert Keyes; Sylvia Robinson	Heart 2 Heart	2008	
"Love To Hate"	Kyla	Jamir Garcia	I Will Be There	2003	
"Love Will Lead You Back" †	Kyla	Dianne Warren	Heartfelt	2007	
"Maghihintay Lamang"	Kyla	Janno Gibbs	I Will Be There	2003	
"Mahal Kita (Di Mo Pansin)" †	Kyla	Francis Louis Salazar	Private Affair	2010	
"Mahal Kita Pero Konti Na Lang" †	Kyla	Joven Tan	The Queen of R&B	2018	
"Mahal Ko O Mahal Ako" #	Kyla	Edwin Marollano	None (Note: Kyla recorded "Mahal Ko O Mahal Ako" as the main theme song for the television series Nasaan Ka Nang Kailangan Kita in 2015.)	2015	
"Make Me Whole"	Kyla	Amel Larrieux; Laru Larrieux	Not Your Ordinary Girl	2004	
"Making Me Crazy"	Kyla	Jay R Jimmy Martinez	Not Your Ordinary Girl	2004	
"Misty Glass Window"	Kyla	Pido Lalimarmo	Heart 2 Heart	2008	
"Monumento" # (Note: Kyla and Lawrence recorded "Monumento" as an entry for the 2016 Himig Handog P-Pop Love Songs songwriting competition.)	Kyla and Kris Lawrence	Jungee Marcelo	The Queen of R&B	2018	
"My Heart" †	Kyla	Brian McKnight	Journey	2014	
"My Melody"	Kyla	Aliya Parcs	The Queen of R&B	2018	
"Muli"	Kyla	Greg Caro	My Very Best	2015	
"Nasaan Ka Na" †	Kyla	Arnie Mendaros	Beautiful Days	2006	
"Nasan Ka?" †	Kyla	Arnie Mendaros	Way to Your Heart	2000	
"Ngayong Wala Ka Na" †	Kyla	Diana Dayao; Jason Balibay; Keith Martin	Beautiful Days	2006	
"Not Your Ordinary Girl" †	Kyla (featuring Jay R and Jimmy Martinez)	Jay R Jimmy Martinez	Not Your Ordinary Girl	2004	
"Now And Forever"	Kyla	Vince De Guzman	Beautiful Days	2006	
"Old Friend" †	Kyla	Thom Bell; Linda Creed	Heart 2 Heart	2008	
"On And On"	Too Phat (featuring Kyla)	Illegal; Joe Flizzow; Malique	Rebirth Into Reality	2005	
"On the Wings of Love" # (Note: Kyla recorded "On the Wings of Love" as the main theme song for the television series On the Wings of Love in 2015.)	Kyla	Jeffrey Osborne; Peter Schless	The Queen of R&B	2018	
"One Day in Your Life" †	Kyla	Renee Armand; Sam Brown III	Heartfelt	2007	
"One More Try" †	Kyla	Raymond Ryan	Way to Your Heart	2000	
"Only For You"	Kyla (featuring Keith Martin)	Keith Martin	Not Your Ordinary Girl	2004	
"Only Gonna Love You" †	Kyla	Jonathan Manalo	The Queen of R&B	2018	
"Oooh Your Love"	Kyla	Arnie Mendaros	Kyla	2002	
"Pagdating Ng Kailanman"	Kyla	Kiko Salazar	The Queen of R&B	2018	
"Pangarap Na Dumating"	Kyla	Yeng Constantino	The Queen of R&B	2018	
"Parting Time"	Erik Santos (featuring Kyla)	Paul Sapiera	Your Love	2006	
"Private Affair"	Kyla	Christine Bendebel	Private Affair	2010	
"Proper Heartbreak"	Kyla	Trina Belamide	The Queen of R&B	2018	
"Ribbon In The Sky"	Kyla	Stevie Wonder	Heart 2 Heart	2008	
"Sa Iyo"	Kyla (featuring Jay Durias)	Jay Durias	The Queen of R&B	2018	
"Sa Iyong Paglayo"	Kyla	Arnie Mendaros	Kyla	2002	
"Salbabida"	Kyla	Jungee Marcelo	Journey	2014	
"Sana Maulit Muli"	Kyla and Gary Valenciano	Angeli Pangilinan; Gary Valenciano	I Will Be There	2003	
"Say That You Love Me"	Kyla (featuring Jay R)	Allan Ayque; Louie Ocampo	Beautiful Days	2006	
"Someone"	Kyla	Tamara Savage; Carstein Shack; Kenneth Karin	Heartfelt	2007	
"Someone To Love"	Kyla	Keith Martin	Not Your Ordinary Girl	2004	
"Something About You	Kyla (featuring Thor)	Artstrong Clarion	Not Your Ordinary Girl	2004	
"Something Special"	Kyla	Arnie Mendaros	Way to Your Heart	2000	
"Somewhere Over the Rainbow"	Kyla	Harold Arlen; Yip Harburg	Heartfelt	2007	
"A Song for the Love in Summer"	Kyla	Ulysis Calumpad	Private Affair	2010	
"Stay Awake"	Kyla	Ronnie Laws	Heart 2 Heart	2008	
"Summertime"	Kyla	Arnie Mendaros	Way to Your Heart	2000	
"Tahan Na"	Kyla (featuring DJ Tijam)	Toto Sorioso	Heart 2 Heart	2008	
"Talk About Us" †	Kyla (featuring Iñigo Pascual)	Jonathan Manalo; Marion Aunor	The Queen of R&B	2018	
"Tanging Pag-ibig Ko"	Kyla	Arnie Mendaros	Kyla	2002	
"Tara Tena" # (Note: Kyla, Kaya and V3 recorded "Tara Tena" as an entry for the 2001 Himig Handog sa Makabagong Kabataan songwriting competition.)	Kyla, Kaya, and V3	Jonathan Manalo	My Very Best	2015	
"Tayo na Lang Kasi" # (Note: Kyla and Dy recorded "Tayo na Lang Kasi" as an entry for the 2017 Himig Handog songwriting competition.)	Kyla and Jason Dy	Soc Villanueva	The Queen of R&B	2018	
"Tayo Pa Rin"	Kyla	Soc Villanueva	The Queen of R&B	2018	
"This Day..."	Kyla	Kyla	Kyla	2002	
"Throwback Lang"	Jolina Magdangal (featuring Kyla)	Jungee Marcelo	Back to Love	2015	
"Til I Got You"	Kyla	Arnie Mendaros	Kyla	2002	
"Til They Take My Heart Away" †	Kyla	Clair Marlo; Steve Porcaro	Not Your Ordinary Girl	2004	
"Till I Met You" # (Note: Kyla recorded "Till I Met You" as the main theme song for the television series Till I Met You in 2016.)	Kyla	Odette Quesada	The Queen of R&B	2018	
"Umulan Man O Umaraw" †	Kyla	Louie Ignacio	Kyla	2002	
"Undeniable"	Kyla and Jay R	Kyla; Jay R	None (Note: "Undeniable" was released as a non-album single in 2020.)	2020	
"Wait for You"	Kyla	Tor Erik Hermansen; Mikkel Eriksen; Taj Jackson	Heartfelt	2007	
"Walang Iba"	Kyla	Arnie Mendaros	I Will Be There	2003	
"Way to Your Heart"	Kyla	Ferdie Marquez	Way to Your Heart	2000	
"What If I"	Kyla	Trina Belamide	The Queen of R&B	2018	
"What More"	Ferhad (featuring Kyla)	Asif Pishore; Imi; Zah	Katakan Saja	2003	
"What More Can I Say"	Kyla	Gary Valenciano	Not Your Ordinary Girl	2004	
"When I'm With You"	Kyla	Keith Martin	Not Your Ordinary Girl	2004	
"Wish We Were Two" †	Fra Lippo Lippi (featuring Kyla)	Per Øystein Sørensen	In a Brilliant White	2002	
"With This Tear"	Kyla	Prince	Heartfelt	2007	
"With You"	Kyla	Rhada Cuadrado	I Will Be There	2003	
"Without You"	Kyla	Laney Stewart; Katrina Willis; Traci Hale; Orenthal Harper; Thabisco Nkhereanye	Beautiful Days	2006	
"You Are Not Alone"	Kyla	Kyla; Ron Roker; Jez Davies; Jay R	Journey	2014	
"You Make Me Feel"	Kyla	Kyla; Jay R Jimmy Martinez	Heart 2 Heart	2008	
"You Were There"	Regine Velasquez (featuring Kyla)	Phil Buckle	None (Note: "You Were There" was originally released as a non-album single in 2005 and was included in Kyla's compilation album My Very Best in 2015.)	2005	
