= List of awards and nominations received by Kyla =

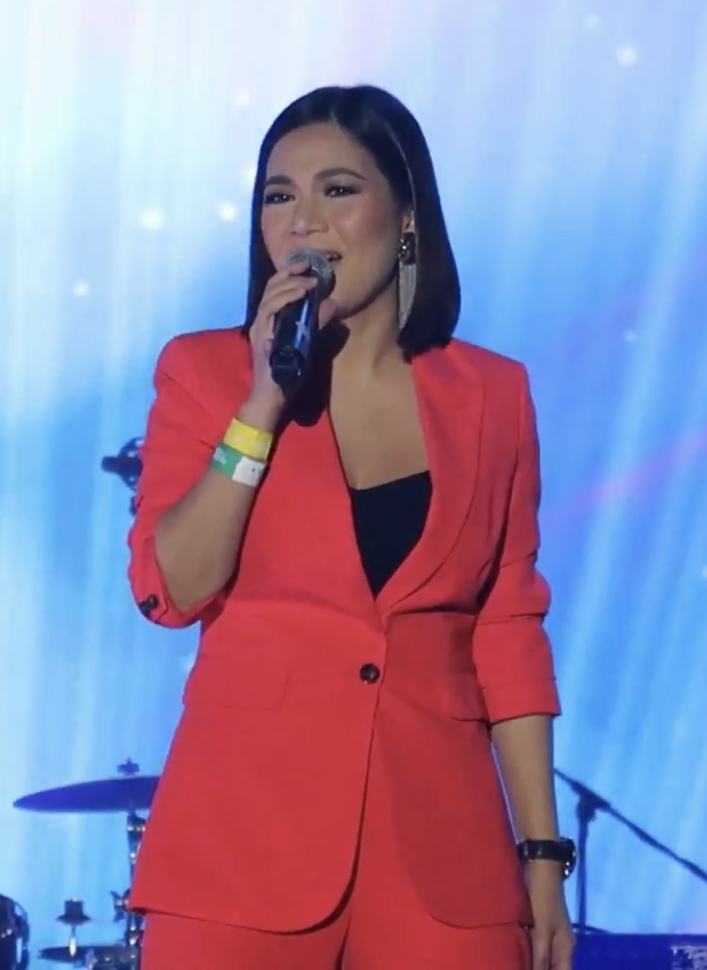
Kyla performing at the Dubai World Trade Centre in 2018

Filipino singer Kyla has received numerous awards and nominations for her contributions to music. She rose to prominence after appearing as a finalist on the television talent show Metropop Star Search in 1997. She signed a record deal with EMI Philippines and worked with producer Chito Ilacad and songwriter Arnie Mendaros on her debut studio album Way to Your Heart, which was released in 2000. Kyla has received Best New Artist accolades at the Awit Awards, Aliw Awards, and MTV Pilipinas Music Awards. The music video for the single "Hanggang Ngayon" won the MTV Video Music Award International Viewer's Choice for Southeast Asia and the MTV Pilipinas for Video of the Year. In 2002, she released her self-titled second album, supported by the single "I Feel For You", which earned her nominations for Favorite Female Video and Favorite Song at the MTV Pilipinas Music Awards.

I Will Be There (2003), Kyla's third studio album, yielded the single "I Will Find You", for which she won the Awit Award for Best R&B Recording. She also recorded "Sana Maulit Muli" with Gary Valenciano, earning the Awit Award for Best Performance by a Duet. Her fourth studio album, Not Your Ordinary Girl, was released in 2004. The title track and two other singles were nominated for Best R&B Recording at the 2005 Awit Awards. The same year, she headlined the Not Just Your Ordinary Girl concert at the Araneta Coliseum to support the album. For the production, she garnered nominations for Best Female Performance in a Concert and Most Promising Female Entertainer at the Aliw Awards. In 2005, Kyla and Jerome John Hughes released a song for the soundtrack of the romantic drama film Let the Love Begin, and she teamed with Jay R on the main theme of the comedy drama Say That You Love Me. Both songs received nominations for Best Performance by a Duet at the 2006 Awit Awards.

Kyla released a cover of the 1989 ballad "Love Will Lead You Back" from her tribute album Heartfelt (2007). The song won Favorite Remake at the 2008 Myx Music Awards, and its music video was nominated for Favorite Mellow Video. The single, "Mahal Kita (Di Mo Pansin)", from her eighth studio album Private Affair received two nominations at the 2010 Awit Awards, winning Best Performance by a Female Recording Artist. Kyla also collaborated with rock band Kamikazee on "Huling Sayaw", which won Best Rock Video at the 2013 Myx Music Awards. At the 2014 Philippine Popular Music Festival, she performed "Salbabida" and won the competition's top honor. The song received three nominations at the 2015 Awit Awards, where it was awarded Best Rock/Alternative Recording. Kyla's extended play, Journey (2014), won R&B Album of the Year, and her ninth studio album, The Queen of R&B (2018), earned five nominations at the Star Awards for Music 2015 and 2018 ceremonies, respectively.

== Awards and nominations ==
Awards and nominations received by Kyla
Award	Year (Note: Indicates the year of ceremony. Each year is linked to the article about the awards held that year, wherever possible.)	Recipient(s) and nominee(s)	Category	Result	Ref(s)
Aliw Awards	2002	Kyla	Best New Artist	Won	
Aliw Awards	2005	Not Just Your Ordinary Girl	Best Performance in a Concert (Female)	Nominated	
Aliw Awards	2005	Not Just Your Ordinary Girl	Most Promising Entertainer (Female)	Nominated	
Awit Awards	2001	"Hanggang Ngayon"	Best Performance by a New Female Recording Artist	Won	
Awit Awards	2001	"Hanggang Ngayon"	Music Video Performance of the Year	Won	
Awit Awards	2001	"Hanggang Ngayon"	Music Video of the Year	Won	
Awit Awards	2001	"Bring It On"	Best R&B Recording	Won	
Awit Awards	2003	"I Feel For You"	Best Performance by a Female Recording Artist	Nominated	
Awit Awards	2003	"This Day"	Best R&B Recording	Nominated	
Awit Awards	2004	Kyla	People's Choice Favorite Artist	Won	
Awit Awards	2004	"Sana Maulit Muli" (with Gary Valenciano)	Best Performance by a Duet	Won	
Awit Awards	2004	"I Will Find You"	Best R&B Recording	Won	
Awit Awards	2004	"Bounce"	Best R&B Recording	Nominated	
Awit Awards	2005	Not Your Ordinary Girl	Album of the Year	Nominated	
Awit Awards	2005	"If The Feeling Is Gone"	Best Ballad Recording	Nominated	
Awit Awards	2005	"Not Your Ordinary Girl" (feat. Jimmy Muna)	Best R&B Recording	Nominated	
Awit Awards	2005	"Something About You" (feat. Thor)	Best R&B Recording	Nominated	
Awit Awards	2005	"Hindi Mo Ba Alam" (feat. PKSO)	Best R&B Recording	Nominated	
Awit Awards	2006	"Let The Love Begin" (with Jerome Hughes)	Best Performance by a Duet	Nominated	
Awit Awards	2006	"Say That You Love Me" with (Jay R)	Best Performance by a Duet	Nominated	
Awit Awards	2007	"Beautiful Days"	Best Ballad Recording	Nominated	
Awit Awards	2008	"Love Will Lead You Back"	Best Performance by a Female Recording Artist	Nominated	
Awit Awards	2008	"It's Over Now"	Best Ballad Recording	Won	
Awit Awards	2009	"Back in Time" (with Jay R)	Best Collaboration	Nominated	
Awit Awards	2009	"You Make Me Feel"	Best R&B Recording	Nominated	
Awit Awards	2011	"Mahal Kita (Di Mo Pansin)"	Best Performance by a Female Recording Artist	Won	
Awit Awards	2011	"Mahal Kita (Di Mo Pansin)"	Best R&B Recording	Nominated	
Awit Awards	2011	"Don't Tie Me Down"	Best Dance Recording	Nominated	
Awit Awards	2015	"Salbabida"	Best Performance by a Female Recording Artist	Nominated	
Awit Awards	2015	"Salbabida"	Song of the Year	Nominated	
Awit Awards	2015	"Salbabida"	Best Inspirational/Religious Recording	Nominated	
Awit Awards	2015	"Salbabida"	Best Rock/Alternative Recording	Won	
Awit Awards	2015	"Kunwa-Kunwari Lang"	Best R&B Recording	Nominated	
Awit Awards	2017	"Monumento" (with Kris Lawrence)	Best Collaboration	Won	
Awit Awards	2017	"Monumento" (with Kris Lawrence)	Best R&B Recording	Nominated	
Awit Awards	2018	"Tayo Na Lang Kasi" (with Jason Dy)	Best R&B Recording	Nominated	
Awit Awards	2019	"Only Gonna Love You" (feat. REQ)	Best R&B Recording	Nominated	
Awit Awards	2019	"Kababata" (with Kritiko)	Best Rap/Hip Hop Recording	Nominated	
Box Office Entertainment Awards	2001	Kyla	Most Promising Female Recording Artist	Won	
Himig Handog	2001	"Tara Tena"	Best Song	Won	
Himig Handog	2016	"Monumento" (with Kris Lawrence)	Best Song	Runner-up	
Himig Handog	2017	"Tayo Na Lang Kasi" (with Jason Dy)	Favorite Interpreter	Won	
Himig Handog	2017	"Tayo Na Lang Kasi" (with Jason Dy)	Best Music Video	Won	
Himig Handog	2018	"Kababata" (with Kritiko)	Best Song	Runner-up	
Metropop Song Festival	2003	"Buti Na Lang"	Best Song	Runner-up	
MTV Pilipinas Music Award	2001	"Hanggang Ngayon"	Favorite New Artist in a Video	Won	
MTV Pilipinas Music Award	2001	"Hanggang Ngayon"	Video of the Year	Won	
MTV Pilipinas Music Award	2001	"Hanggang Ngayon"	Favorite Female Video	Nominated	
MTV Pilipinas Music Award	2001	"Hanggang Ngayon"	Favorite Song	Nominated	
MTV Pilipinas Music Award	2002	"I Feel For You"	Favorite Female Video	Nominated	
MTV Pilipinas Music Award	2002	"I Feel For You"	Favorite Song	Nominated	
MTV Pilipinas Music Award	2002	"I Feel For You"	Favorite Love Ballad	Won	
MTV Pilipinas Music Award	2005	"If The Feeling Is Gone"	Favorite Female Video	Nominated	
MTV Video Music Awards	2001	"Hanggang Ngayon"	International Viewer's Choice for Southeast Asia	Won	
Myx Music Awards	2006	"Say That You Love Me" (with Jay R)	Favorite Collaboration	Nominated	
Myx Music Awards	2008	Kyla	Favorite Female Artist	Nominated	
Myx Music Awards	2008	"Love Will Lead You Back"	Favorite Mellow Video	Nominated	
Myx Music Awards	2008	"Love Will Lead You Back"	Favorite Remake	Won	
Myx Music Awards	2009	Kyla	Favorite Female Artist	Nominated	
Myx Music Awards	2010	Kyla	Favorite Female Artist	Nominated	
Myx Music Awards	2010	"Back in Time" (with Jay R)	Favorite Song	Won	
Myx Music Awards	2010	"Back in Time" (with Jay R)	Favorite Collaboration	Nominated	
Myx Music Awards	2010	"Old Friend"	Favorite Mellow Video	Won	
Myx Music Awards	2010	"Heart to Heart"	Favorite Remake	Nominated	
Myx Music Awards	2011	Kyla	Favorite Female Artist	Nominated	
Myx Music Awards	2012	Kyla	Favorite Female Artist	Nominated	
Myx Music Awards	2012	Kyla	Favorite Myx Live Performance	Nominated	
Myx Music Awards	2013	"Huling Sayaw" (with Kamikazee)	Favorite Collaboration	Nominated	
Myx Music Awards	2013	"Huling Sayaw" (with Kamikazee)	Favorite Rock Video	Won	
Myx Music Awards	2015	Kyla	Favorite Female Artist	Nominated	
Myx Music Awards	2015	"Dito Na Lang"	Favorite Music Video	Nominated	
Myx Music Awards	2015	"Dito Na Lang"	Favorite Mellow Video	Nominated	
Myx Music Awards	2015	"Dito Na Lang"	Favorite Song	Nominated	
Myx Music Awards	2016	"On the Wings of Love"	Favorite Remake	Won	
Myx Music Awards	2016	"On the Wings of Love"	Favorite Media Soundtrack	Won	
Myx Music Awards	2017	"Till I Met You"	Favorite Media Soundtrack	Nominated	
Myx Music Awards	2018	"Tayo Na Lang Kasi" (with Jason Dy)	Collaboration of the Year	Nominated	
Myx Music Awards	2019	"Fix You and Me"	Mellow Video of the Year	Nominated	
Philippine Popular Music Festival	2014	"Salbabida"	Best Song	Won	
Star Awards for Music	2009	Kyla	R&B Artist of the Year	Nominated	
Star Awards for Music	2009	Heart 2 Heart	R&B Album of the Year	Nominated	
Star Awards for Music	2011	Kyla	Female Recording Artist of the Year	Nominated	
Star Awards for Music	2011	Private Affair	Album of the Year	Nominated	
Star Awards for Music	2015	Kyla	R&B Artist of the Year	Nominated	
Star Awards for Music	2015	Journey	R&B Album of the Year	Won	
Star Awards for Music	2015	Journey	Album Cover Concept and Design of the Year	Nominated	
Star Awards for Music	2018	Kyla	Female Recording Artist of the Year	Nominated	
Star Awards for Music	2018	Kyla	R&B Artist of the Year	Nominated	
Star Awards for Music	2018	Kyla	Female Concert Performer of the Year	Nominated	
Star Awards for Music	2018	Divas: Live in Manila	Concert of the Year	Nominated	
Star Awards for Music	2018	The Queen of R&B	R&B Album of the Year	Nominated	
Star Awards for Music	2018	The Queen of R&B	Album Cover of the Year	Nominated	
Wish 107.5 Music Awards	2019	Kyla	Artist of the Year	Nominated	
Wish 107.5 Music Awards	2019	"Fix You and Me"	R&B Song of the Year	Won	
Wish 107.5 Music Awards	2019	"Only Gonna Love You" (feat. REQ)	R&B Performance of the Year	Nominated	
Wish 107.5 Music Awards	2019	"Mahal Kita Pero Konti Na Lang"	Ballad Performance of the Year	Nominated	
