= Kyla discography =

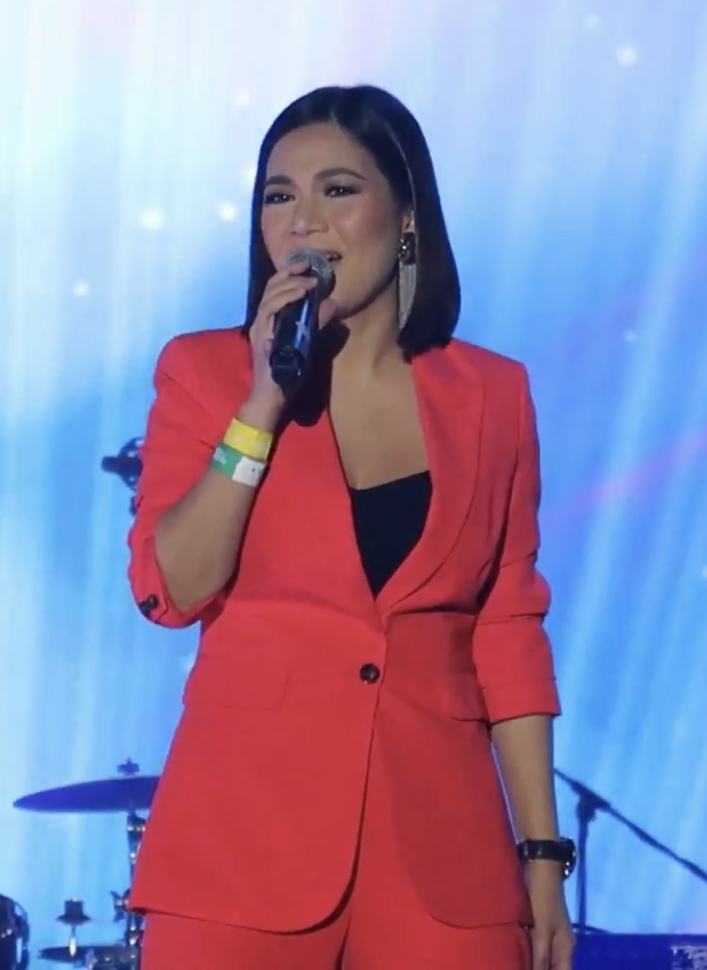
- Kyla performing at the Dubai World Trade Centre in 2018
- Studio albums: 10
- Extended plays: 1
- Compilation albums: 1
- Singles: 60
- Music videos: 38
- Promotional singles: 15
- Box sets: 1

Filipino singer Kyla has released nine studio albums, one compilation album, one extended play (EP), fifty-two singles (including sixteen as featured artist), fifteen promotional singles, and thirty-three music videos. She signed with EMI Philippines and released her debut studio album, Way to Your Heart, in 2000, which spawned three singles: "Bring It On", "One More Try", and "Hanggang Ngayon". Kyla's eponymous second album was released in March 2002, and contained the lead single "I Feel For You". In 2003, she released the title track from her third studio album, I Will Be There. Two more singles were later released: "Bounce" and "Flexin", the latter featuring English boy band Blue.

Kyla's fourth studio album, Not Your Ordinary Girl (2004), was supported by the lead single "Human Nature", a cover of Michael Jackson's 1983 song. It also produced the singles "Because of You", "If The Feeling Is Gone", and "Till They Take My Heart Away", and was certified double platinum by the Philippine Association of the Record Industry (PARI). In 2006, she released her fifth studio album, Beautiful Days, as well as its self-written title track. Kyla then released two cover albums: Heartfelt (2007) and Heart 2 Heart (2009). In 2010, she signed a regional record deal with Indonesian label Tarra Group, which saw her collaborate with Joeniar Arief on the single "Indah Cinta Kita". Kyla's eighth studio album, Private Affair, was released in November 2010 and included the singles "Mahal Kita (Di Mo Pansin)" and "Don't Tie Me Down".

In June 2014, Kyla released her debut EP, Journey, which contained a duet—"My Heart"—with American singer-songwriter Brian McKnight. That year, she released the gospel song "Salbabida" as part of the Philippine Popular Music Festival, where it won the top honor. Exiting EMI, Kyla signed with Star Music in December 2016. In January 2018, Kyla released the single "Only Gonna Love You" from her tenth studio album, The Queen of R&B. A second single, "Fix You and Me", was issued the following month. Kyla's first seven albums are platinum-certified by PARI.

== Albums ==
=== Studio albums ===
List of studio albums, with sales figures and certifications
Title	Album details	Sales	Certifications	Ref.
Way to Your Heart	Released: 2000; Label: EMI; Formats: CD, cassette	PHL: 40,000 (Note: Philippine sales figure equivalent of platinum certification for Way to Your Heart)	PARI: Platinum	
Kyla	Released: 2002; Label: EMI; Formats: CD, cassette	PHL: 40,000 (Note: Philippine sales figure equivalent of platinum certification for Kyla)	PARI: Platinum	
I Will Be There	Released: 2003; Label: EMI; Formats: CD, cassette	PHL: 40,000 (Note: Philippine sales figure equivalent of platinum certification for I Will Be There)	PARI: Platinum	
Not Your Ordinary Girl	Released: 2004; Label: EMI; Formats: CD, digital download	PHL: 80,000 (Note: Philippine sales figure equivalent of double platinum certification for Not Your Ordinary Girl)	PARI: 2× Platinum	
Beautiful Days	Released: 2006; Label: EMI; Formats: CD, digital download	PHL: 40,000 (Note: Philippine sales figure equivalent of platinum certification for Beautiful Days)	PARI: Platinum	
Heartfelt	Released: 2007; Label: EMI; Formats: CD, digital download	PHL: 30,000 (Note: Philippine sales figure equivalent of platinum certification for Heartfelt)	PARI: Platinum	
Heart 2 Heart	Released: 2008; Label: EMI; Formats: CD, digital download	PHL: 25,000 (Note: Philippine sales figure equivalent of platinum certification for Heart 2 Heart)	PARI: Platinum	
Private Affair	Released: 2010; Label: PolyEast; Formats: CD, digital download	—N/a	—N/a	
The Queen of R&B	Released: 2018; Label: Star Music; Formats: CD, digital download, streaming	PHL: 7,500 (Note: Philippine sales figure equivalent of gold certification for The Queen of R&B)	PARI: Gold	
Next Album	Released: 2025; Label: Star Music; Formats: CD, digital download, streaming	—N/a	—N/a	

=== Compilation albums ===
List of compilation albums
Title	Album details	Ref.
Essence of Soul	Released: 2010; Label: PolyEast; Formats: CD, digital download	

== Extended plays ==
List of extended plays
Title	EP details	Ref.
Journey	Released: 2014; Label: PolyEast; Formats: CD, digital download	

== Box sets ==
List of box sets with notes
Title	Details	Notes	Ref.
Heart Songs	Released: 2009; Label: PolyEast; Format: CD, VCD	2-CD boxset of her cover albums Heartfelt and Heart 2 Heart; Features a bonus Video CD containing Kyla's music videos	

== Singles ==
=== As lead artist ===
List of singles as lead artist, showing year released and originating album
Title	Year	Album	Ref.
"Bring It On"	2000	Way to Your Heart	
"One More Try"	2000	Way to Your Heart	
"Hanggang Ngayon"	2001	Way to Your Heart	
"I Feel For You"	2002	Kyla	
"I Will Be There"	2003	I Will Be There	
"Bounce"	2003	I Will Be There	
"Flexin" (with Blue)	2003	I Will Be There	
"Human Nature"	2004	Not Your Ordinary Girl	
"Because of You"	2004	Not Your Ordinary Girl	
"If the Feeling Is Gone"	2004	Not Your Ordinary Girl	
"Not Your Ordinary Girl"	2004	Not Your Ordinary Girl	
"Til They Take My Heart Away"	2005	Not Your Ordinary Girl	
"Ngayong Wala Ka Na"	2006	Beautiful Days	
"Beautiful Days"	2006	Beautiful Days	
"Nasaan Ka Na"	2006	Beautiful Days	
"I Wish You Love"	2007	Beautiful Days	
"Love Will Lead You Back"	2007	Heartfelt	
"I Don't Want You to Go"	2007	Heartfelt	
"One Day in Your Life"	2008	Heartfelt	
"It's Over Now"	2008	Heartfelt	
"If I Were You"	2008	Heartfelt	
"Heart to Heart"	2008	Heart 2 Heart	
"Old Friend"	2009	Heart 2 Heart	
"Back in Time" (with Jay R)	2009	Heart 2 Heart	
"Mahal Kita (Di Mo Pansin)"	2010	Private Affair	
"Don't Tie Me Down"	2011	Private Affair	
"How Deep Is Your Love"	2011	Private Affair	
"Kunwa-kunwari Lang"	2014	Journey	
"Dito Na Lang"	2014	Journey	
"My Heart" (with Brian McKnight)	2014	Journey	
"Only Gonna Love You"	2018	The Queen of R&B	
"Fix You and Me"	2018	The Queen of R&B	
"Talk About Us"	2018	The Queen of R&B	
"Mahal Kita Pero Konti Na Lang"	2018	The Queen of R&B	
"Huling Muli"	2019	The Queen of R&B	
"Undeniable" (with Jay R)	2020	Non-album single	
"Back to Bliss"	2025	Next Album	
"Konti Na Lang"	2026	Next Album	
"Kaya Ko Yan" (featuring Aces)	2026	Next Album	
"Stand Up"	2026	Next Album	
"Next Episode"	2026	Next Album	
"SANDAANDALI"	2026	Next Album	
"Totoo Na"	2026	Next Album	

=== As featured artist ===
List of singles as featured artist, showing year released and originating album
Title	Year	Album	Ref.
"Laro" (D-Coy featuring Kyla)	2001	Plastic Age	
"Can We Just Stop and Talk Awhile" (Gary Valenciano featuring Kyla)	2002	One2One	
"Kahit Kailan" (South Border featuring Kyla)	2002	Retrospective	
"I Wanna Get Close" (Freestyle featuring Kyla)	2002	I Wanna Get Close	
"Wish We Were Two" (Fra Lippo Lippi featuring Kyla)	2002	In a Brilliant White	
"What More" (Ferhad featuring Kyla)	2003	Katakan Saja	
"On and On" (Too Phat featuring Kyla)	2005	Rebirth Into Reality	
"Partin Time" (Erik Santos featuring Kyla)	2007	Your Love	
"Back at Home" (Young JV featuring Kyla)	2009	Ready or Not	
"Ang Aking Puso" (Janno Gibbs featuring Kyla)	2009	Orig	
"How Do You Keep the Music Playing?" (Martin Nievera featuring Kyla)	2010	As Always	
"Indah Cinta Kita" (Joeniar Arief featuring Kyla)	2011	Non-album single	
"Huling Sayaw" (Kamikazee featuring Kyla)	2012	Romantico	
"Don't Tell Me Don't" (Erik Santos featuring Kyla)	2015	Champion Reborn	
"You Are Not Alone" (Jay R featuring Kyla)	2015	Elevated	
"Throwback Lang" (Jolina Magdangal featuring Kyla)	2015	Back to Love	

=== Promotional singles ===
List of promotional singles, showing year released and originating album
Title	Year	Album	Ref.
"Tara Tena" (with Kaya and V3)	2001	Himig Handog sa Makabagong Kabataan	
"Let the Love Begin" (with Jerome John Hughes)	2005	Let the Love Begin	
"Say That You Love Me" (with Jay R)	2005	Say That You Love Me	
"Pilipinas, Tara Na!"	2011	Non-album single	
"Why Don't We Give"	2012	The Songwriter and the Hitmakers	
"Salbabida"	2014	Philpop 2014: Loud & Proud	
"On the Wings of Love"	2015	On the Wings of Love	
"Mahal Ko o Mahal Ako"	2015	Nasaan Ka Nang Kailangan Kita	
"Monumento" (with Kris Lawrence)	2016	Himig Handog P-Pop Love Songs	
"Because You Loved Me" (with Jona Viray)	2016	Life Songs: Maalaala Mo Kaya 25	
"Till I Met You"	2016	Till I Met You	
"Tayo Na Lang Kasi" (with Jason Dy)	2017	Himig Handog 2017	
"Kababata" (with Kritiko)	2018	Himig Handog 2018	
"Even the Nights Are Better"	2018	Since I Found You	
"Init sa Lamig"	2022	The Broken Marriage Vow	

== Music videos ==
List of music videos, showing year released and director
Title	Year	Director(s)	Ref.
"Hanggang Ngayon"	2001	Lyle Sacris	
"I Feel for You"	2002	—N/a	
"Can We Just Stop and Talk Awhile" (Gary Valenciano featuring Kyla)	2002	—N/a	
"I Will Be There"	2003	—N/a	
"Buti Na Lang"	2003	—N/a	
"Human Nature"	2004	GB Sampedro	
"If the Feeling Is Gone"	2004	Lee Nadela	
"Not Your Ordinary Girl"	2005	GB Sampedro	
"Til They Take My Heart Away"	2005	Sig Sanchez	
"Let the Love Begin" (with Jerome John Hughes)	2005	—N/a	
"Ngayong Wala Ka Na"	2006	Treb Monteras II	
"Beautiful Days"	2006	Topel Lee	
"Nasaan Ka Na"	2006	—N/a	
"Love Will Lead You Back"	2007	—N/a	
"I Don't Want You to Go"	2007	Treb Monteras II	
"One Day in Your Life"	2008	Wincy Ong	
"It's Over Now"	2008	Nico Puertollano	
"Heart to Heart"	2008	Treb Monteras II	
"Old Friend"	2009	—N/a	
"Mahal Kita (Di Mo Pansin)"	2010	Treb Monteras II	
"Don't Tie Me Down"	2011	Nani Naguit	
"How Deep Is Your Love"	2011	Nani Naguit	
"Indah Cinta Kita"	2011	—N/a	
"Huling Sayaw" (Kamikazee featuring Kyla)	2012	Eric Perlas, Boogs San Juan, Carlo Perlas	
"Kunwa-kunwari Lang"	2014	Treb Monteras II	
"Salbabida"	2014	Toper Santos	
"Dito Na Lang"	2014	Treb Monteras II	
"You Are Not Alone" (with Jay R)	2015	Cristhian Perez Escolano	
"On the Wings of Love"	2015	Jojo Saguin	
"Monumento" (with Kris Lawrence)	2016	Angeline Lozada	
"Tayo Na Lang Kasi"	2017	Joyce Ching, Princess Asuncion	
"Only Gonna Love You"	2018	John Prats	
"Fix You and Me"	2018	John Prats	
"Mahal Kita Pero Konti Na Lang"	2019	—N/a	
"Huling Muli"	2019	—N/a	
"Back to Bliss"	2025	—N/a	
"Konti Na Lang"	2026	—N/a	
"Kaya Ko Yan" (featuring Aces)	2026	—N/a	
