= Essence of Soul =

Greatest hits album by Kyla
- Released: July 2010 (Philippines)
- Recorded: 2000–2010
- Genre: R&B, soul, pop
- Language: English, Tagalog
- Label: PolyEast Records; EMI Philippines

Kyla chronology
Heartsongs Deluxe Edition (2009)	Essence of Soul (2010)	Private Affair (2010)

Essence of Soul (a.k.a. Essence of Soul: The Hits Collection) is a compilation album by Filipino R&B singer Kyla. It was released by EMI Philippines and PolyEast Records in July 2010 as part of her tenth year in the Philippine music industry.

The album contains two CDs featuring 27 of her biggest hits such as "Hanggang Ngayon", "If the Feeling is Gone", "Back in Time", "Beautiful Days", "Not Your Ordinary Girl", Because of You", "I Feel For You", "I Don't Want You to Go", "It's Over Now", and I Feel for You. It also contains a new song "Hanggang Wakas", a duet with Malaysian pop-R&B artist Hazami.

== Track listing ==
Disc 1:

1. Hanggang Ngayon (taken from Way To Your Heart)
2. Because Of You (taken from Not Your Ordinary Girl)
3. Back In Time (taken from Heart 2 Heart)
4. Old Friend (taken from Heart 2 Heart)
5. It’s Over Now (taken from Heartfelt)
6. ’Til They Take My Heart Away (taken from Not Your Ordinary Girl)
7. You Make Me Feel (taken from Heart 2 Heart)
8. One Day In Your Life (taken from Heartfelt)
9. Nasaan Ka Na (taken from Beautiful Days)
10. If I Were You (taken from Heartfelt)
11. Someone To Love (taken from Not Your Ordinary Girl)
12. I’ll Be Over You (taken from Heart 2 Heart)
13. Bring It On (taken from Way To Your Heart)
14. If The Feeling Is Gone (taken from Not Your Ordinary Girl)

Disc 2:

1. Heart To Heart (taken from Heart 2 Heart)
2. Love Will Lead You Back (taken from Heartfelt)
3. Not Your Ordinary Girl (taken from Not Your Ordinary Girl)
4. Beautiful Days (taken from Beautiful Days)
5. Say That You Love Me (taken from Beautiful Days)
6. Human Nature (taken from Not Your Ordinary Girl)
7. I Feel For You (taken from Kyla)
8. One More Try (taken from Way To Your Heart)
9. Make Me Whole (taken from Not Your Ordinary Girl)
10. I Will Be There (taken from I Will Be There)
11. Somewhere Over The Rainbow (taken from Heartfelt)
12. Ngayong Wala Ka Na (taken from Beautiful Days)
13. I Don’t Want You To Go (taken from Heartfelt)
14. Hanggang Wakas (duet with Hazami)
