= The Queen of R&B =

Kyla (The Queen of R&B)

Studio album by Kyla
- Released: April 15, 2018
- Recorded: 2017
- Genre: R&B, soul
- Length: 69:23
- Language: English, Filipino
- Label: Star Music
- Producer: Jonathan Manalo (executive), Kyla

Kyla chronology
Journey (2014)	Kyla (The Queen of R&B) (2018)	Next Album (2025)

Singles from The Queen of R&B
- 1. "Only Gonna Love You" Released: January 19, 2018; 2. "Fix You and Me" Released: February 2, 2018; 3. "Talk About Us" Released: June 8, 2018; 4. "Mahal Kita Pero Konti Na Lang" Released: July 18, 2018; 5. "Huling Muli" Released: February 14, 2019

Kyla (The Queen of R&B) is the tenth studio album of Filipino R&B singer Kyla, released on April 15, 2018, by Star Music. It is Kyla's first album with Star Music after 16 years with PolyEast Records / EMI Philippines. The album is certified gold.

== Background and development ==
Upon signing with Star Music in December 2016, it was announced that she will release an album in the third quarter of 2017, but was delayed a few times. Executive producer Jonathan Manalo shared that the concept was a throwback to 90's R&B. The label first intended to release an extended play.

The album is composed mostly of R&B ballads and soul with the a few upbeat and mid-tempo tracks. Kyla included one cover in the album, South Border's "Sa'yo" featuring its songwriter Jay Durias. It also contains four bonus tracks, which are previously recorded but unreleased songs by Kyla: her theme song renditions of "Till I Met You" and "On The Wings Of Love" and her Himig Handog interpretations of "Monumento" and "Tayo Na Lang Kasi."

On January 15, 2018, Star Music announced that Kyla will have double-lead singles with a full-length album release in March 2018. The first lead single, "Only Gonna Love You," was released on January 19, while the second lead single, "Fix You And Me" was released on February 2. Her album release was again delayed from March 17, 2018, to April due to "health reasons."

== Singles ==
- "Only Gonna Love You," an urban, pop-reggaeton track, was released as the album's first lead single on January 19, 2018, and features international rapper REQ. Kyla performed the single at ASAP on March 25, 2018. The music video was directed by John Prats and Brightbulb production.
- "Fix You and Me" was released on February 2, 2018, two weeks after the first lead single. The music video is a sequel to "Only Gonna Love You."
- "Talk About Us" (feat. Iñigo Pascual) was released on June 8, 2018, at Monster RX 93.1 as the third single.
- "Mahal Kita Pero Konti Na Lang," due to its popularity, was released on July 18, 2018, at MOR 101.9 as the fourth single.
- "Huling Muli," due to its popularity, was released on February 14, 2019, at MOR 101.9 as the fifth single.

== Track listing ==
No.	Title	Writer(s)	Length
1.	"Only Gonna Love You (feat. REQ)"	Jonathan Manalo	3:43
2.	"Only Gonna Love You (Motown Interlude)"	Jonathan Manalo	0:41
3.	"My Melody"	Aliya Parcs	3:23
4.	"Talk About Us (feat. Iñigo Pascual)"	Jonathan Manalo; Marion Aunor	4:13
5.	"Fix You & Me"	Jonathan Manalo; Zadon	3:54
6.	"What If I"	Trina Belamide	4:16
7.	"Proper Heartbreak"	Jude Gitamondoc; Therese Villarante; Maeren Sanoria	5:01
8.	"Tayo Pa Rin" (Metropop 1999 entry)	Soc Villanueva	4:41
9.	"Pangarap Na Dumating"	Yeng Constantino	4:32
10.	"Huling Muli"	Jungee Marcelo	3:35
11.	"Pagdating Ng Kailanman"	Kiko Salazar	3:23
12.	"Sa Iyo (feat. Jay Durias)" (Cover of South Border's "Sa'yo")	Jay Durias	3:51
13.	"Only Gonna Love You (Remix)"	Jonathan Manalo	3:31
14.	"Fix You & Me (Acoustic Version)"	Jonathan Manalo & Zadon	3:58
15.	"Mahal Kita Pero Konti Na Lang"	Joven Tan	3:52

Bonus tracks
No.	Title	Writer(s)	Length
16.	"On the Wings of Love" (On the Wings of Love OST)	Jeffrey Osborne	4:33
17.	"Till I Met You" (Till I Met You OST)	Odette Quesada	4:07
18.	"Monumento (feat. Kris Lawrence)" (Himig Handog 2016 entry)	Jungee Marcelo	3:59
19.	"Tayo Na Lang Kasi (feat. Jason Dy)" (Himig Handog 2017 entry)	Soc Villanueva	4:10

== Release history ==
Country	Date	Label	Format
Philippines	April 15, 2018	Star Music	CD, digital download
Worldwide	April 15, 2018	Star Music	Digital download
