= Video of the Year =

Video of the Year may refer to:

- BET Award for Video of the Year
- Country Music Association Award for Video of the Year
- Grammy Award for Video of the Year
- Juno Award for Video of the Year
- MTV Video Music Award for Video of the Year
- Los Premios MTV Latinoamérica for Video of the Year
- MTV Pilipinas for Video of the Year
- MTV Video Music Award Japan for Video of the Year
