= Luke Mejares =

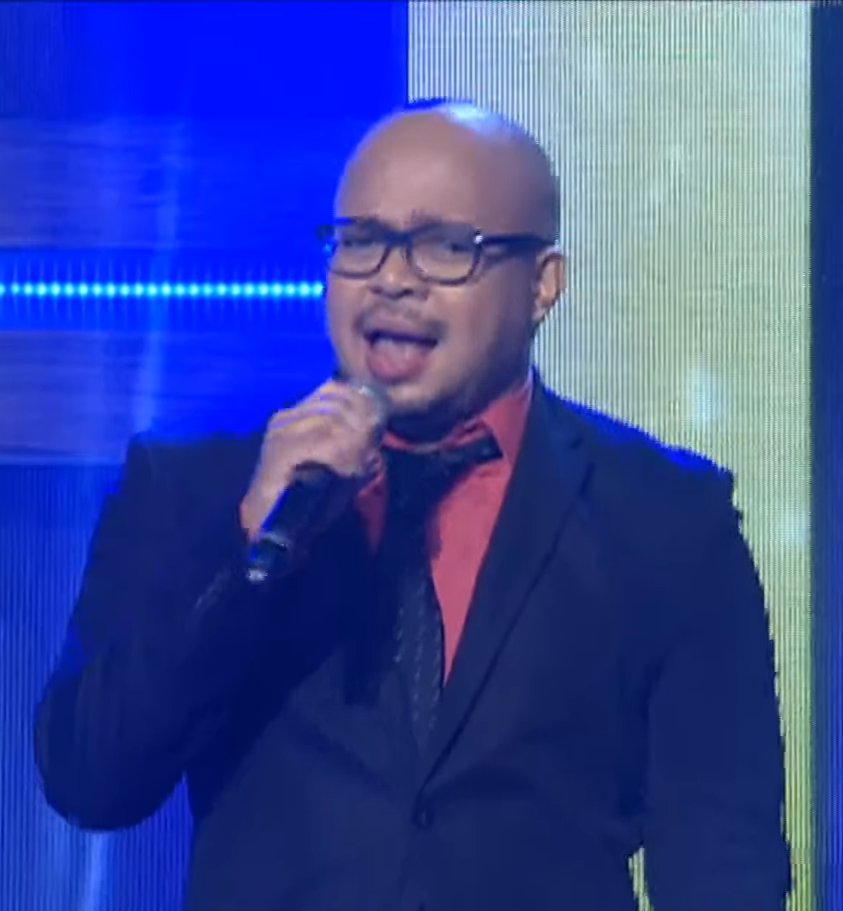
- Mejares in 2017

Background information
- Born: Michael Luke Mejares; June 26, 1975 (age 51); Manila, Philippines
- Origin: Tagbilaran, Bohol, Philippines
- Genres: Pop, R&B, dance, soul
- Occupation: Singer-songwriter
- Instrument: Vocals
- Years active: 1998–2002 (with South Border); 2002–present (as solo artist)
- Labels: Sony BMG (2004-2012); Ivory Music (2012-present)

Michael Luke Mejares (born June 26, 1975) is a Filipino singer and songwriter of African-American descent.

== Life ==
Mejares was born in Manila, to a Boholana mother, Elvira Porticos Mejares, and an African-American father named Robert Davis. His biological father left him when Mejares was still young and grew up with a stepfather named Leonides S. Mejares in Tagbilaran, Bohol. Mejares studied elementary and high school in University of Bohol in Tagbilaran City, while he completed Bachelor of Arts in English major in Marketing Studies at University of San Jose – Recoletos in Cebu City.

== Works ==
He was chosen as the new vocalist of neo-soul band South Border in 1998 replacing Brix Ferraris, but he decided to pursue his solo career in 2002. He was also one of the co-hosts of Sabado Boys, a weekly musical talk show on TV5.

Luke Mejares also joined the fraternity for youth, the Order of Demolay in his native of Tagbilaran City, Bohol.

In 2017, Mejares was named as board member of the Movie and Television Review and Classification Board (MTRCB).

The same year, Mejares signed with Homeworkz Music and released an original album titled Blackbird. The first singles launched were "Funk Whatcha Heard" and "Aaminin Ko Sayo".

== Discography ==
=== Albums ===
- 2004: Stop, Luke and Listen
- 2007: Pangako
- 2012: Kasayaw
- 2017: Blackbird

== Awards and nominations ==
| Year | Award giving body | Category | Nominated work | Results |
|---|---|---|---|---|
| 2008 | Awit Awards | Best R&B Recording | "Pangako Yan" | Nominated |
