= Clair Marlo =

American musician

- Origin: New York City, New York, U.S.
- Genres: Pop, jazz
- Occupations: Singer-songwriter, music producer, film-television composer, musician, audio mixer, educator
- Instruments: Singing, piano, keyboards, drum programming, mixing
- Years active: 1986–present
- Labels: Higher Octave, Virgin, Sonic Images, Earthtone, Sony, Telarc, Wildcat-MCA, Sheffield Lab, Invisible Hand Music, Universal/MCA, Invisible Hand Records, Blue Rain Records
- Website: www.clairmarlo.com

Clair Marlo is an American singer-songwriter, record producer, composer, and educator. She has a working catalogue of over 6,000 original pieces used in film and television shows and heard on the radio and on streaming sites worldwide. Her working catalog includes all styles including orchestral, neu classical, jazz, rock, trailer music, folk and more. She currently has over 2,000,000 monthly listeners on Spotify as a solo artist.

She is known for her multiplatinum hit singles "'Til They Take My Heart Away" and "Without Me", both from her debut album, Let It Go. Her songs became a staple on radio stations during the early 1990s and her albums (both as recording artist and as producer) for Sheffield Lab Records have become audiophile staples and collector's items around the world. Marlo is also known for co-writing and singing "Sviraj" and "Lullaby" on Paul Schwartz's album, Aria 2 – New Horizon, which reached number 5 on Billboard's Top Classical Crossover Chart in 1999.

== Beginnings ==
Clair Marlo was born in Queens to Croatian immigrant parents. She began her musical studies at the age of five with accordion, then started piano and voice at the age of nine. At 16, Clair started college at the Aaron Copeland School of Music and got her first publishing deal with MCA Music. Private studies include opera singer Camilla Williams, big band arranger Spud Murphy and choir conductor John Motley. Marlo holds a bachelor's degree from Berklee College of Music (1980) in Composition with additional courses in Audio Production and Engineering. Marlo also holds a master's degree in Music Technology with a specialty in studio technology (2023), Summa Cum Laude.

== Career highlights ==
Marlo has worked with many notable artists, composers, musicians, engineers and producers including Neil Young, Jeff Porcaro, Steve Porcaro, George Massenburg, Doug Sax, Bill Schnee Joe Porcaro, David Paich, Leland Sklar, Grant Geissman, Craig Fuller, Abraham Laboriel Sr., Dean Parks, Luis Conte, and Steve Katz. Pop rock drummer Jeff Porcaro played on her song " 'Til They Take My Heart Away" and other songs on her debut album, Let It Go. This album became a hit in Europe, the Philippines, and Japan and was especially embraced by the audiophile community because it was recorded by Sheffield Lab Records as a direct-to-2-track recording, with the entire group in the studio at the same time. "'Til They Take My Heart Away" is popular in the Philippines and has been covered by many local singers such as Kyla (on Not Your Ordinary Girl), M.Y.M.P., and Regine Velasquez.

Marlo owns the music production company Invisible Hand Productions, founded in 1995, and production company Building 11 Music Group which includes Write On Music Publishing, and Tarzana Jane Music Publishing.

Marlo has produced for such artists as Harry Chapin (posthumously), Pat Coil, Michael Ruff, Kilauea (Daniel Ho), and Grant Geissman. Her production of Michael Ruff's "Speaking in Melodies" for Sheffield Lab Records is an audiophile collector's item and was on Stereophile's list of "1994 Records to Die For".

== Discography ==
=== Solo albums ===
- Let It Go (1989)
- Behaviour Self (1995)
- Rediscovered (2007)
- Trinity (2019)

=== Albums as part of groups ===
- Liquid Amber – Liquid Amber (1994)
- Liquid Amber – Adrift (1995)
- Tairona – Andean Christmas (1996)
- Vox Mundi – Christmas Spirit (1998)

=== As producer ===
- Pat Coil – Steps (1990)
- Kilauea - Antigua Blue (1992)
- Pat Coil – Just Ahead (1992)
- Michael Ruff – Speaking in Melodies (1993)
- Kilauea - Diamond Collection (1995)
- Grant Geissman – In with the Out Crowd (1998)
- Lori Barth – Sensuel (2002)

=== As composer/songwriter ===
- Glenn Eric – Glenn Eric (1987)
- Spies – Music of Espionage (1988)
- Let It Go (1989)
- Kilauea - Antigua Blue (1992)
- Liquid Amber (1994)
- Behaviour Self (1995)
- Liquid Amber – Adrift (1995)
- Tairona – Andean Christmas (1996)
- Grant Geissman – In with the Out Crowd (1998)
- Vox Mundi – Christmas Spirit (1998)
- Mark Winkler – City Lights (1998)
- Aria – 3 CD collection (2004)
- Red Rose – Good Friends (2004)
- Neil Young – Living with War (2006)
- Julia Duncan – The Love Lounge (2007)
- 3 Hours of Creepy Sounds for Halloween(2009)
- Celtic Journey – Celtic Journey (2011)
- Up Close Volume 8 – Sheffield Lab Sampler Featuring Pat Coil

== Personal life ==
Marlo is based out of Los Angeles, and Istria, Croatia. She has two children.
