= South Border =

Filipino pop and R&B band

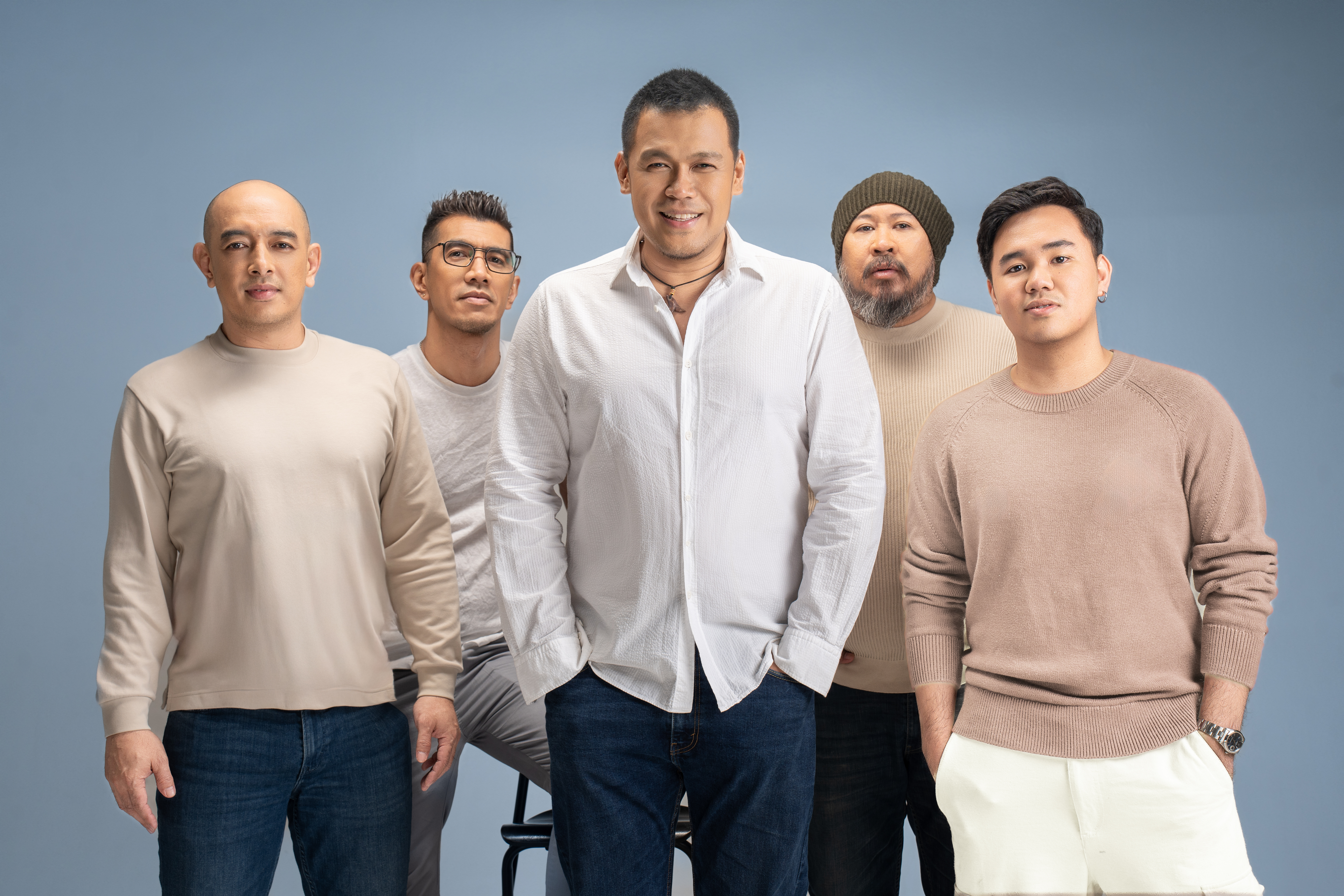
- South Border in 2025

Background information
- Origin: Davao City and Manila, Philippines
- Genres: Pop; R&B; jazz; soul
- Years active: 1993–present
- Labels: Sony Music Philippines; Brown Hand Records; Hot Seat Records; Curve Entertainment Inc.
- Members: Jay Durias; Janno Queyquep; Otep Concepcion; Manuel Tabuñar; Johndave Picache
- Past members: Brix Ferraris; Luke Mejares; Duncan Ramos; Vince Alaras; Ric Junasa; Sol Glass; Tata Balane; Paul Benitez; Butch Victoriano; Pido Lalimarmo; Jack Rufo; Rancis de Leon; Bagets Mendez; Maki Ricafort; Marlowe Mata; Edward Picache; Kell Gatdula

South Border is a Filipino pop and R&B band formed in the early 1990s that gained widespread recognition in the music scene in the mid 1990s to the 2000s.

== History ==
=== Origins and early years ===
Originally formed in 1993, the band whose name is a tribute to their roots in Davao down south, first came into national prominence when they played as a session band to Mastaplann’s hit song “The Way of the Plann” Mastaplann was a popular hip-hop group which led to their signing to Universal Records in 1995. They launched their first self-titled album. It included a Jimmy Antiporda song entitled "May Pag-Ibig Pa Kaya" which they interpreted in the Metro Manila Pop Music Festival earlier that year. Another song, "Kahit Kailan" was awarded 1996 Song of the Year by various radio stations, thus giving them their first big hit.

The following year, the album reached gold, then platinum. South Border was all set for their first major concert at the Araneta Coliseum. As expected, thousands of their newfound fans trooped to fill the massive dome to the brim. Before the end of 1997, the exceptional talents of South Border was recognized by their peers in the industry when they won the most number of trophies at the 10th Awit Awards including Best Performance by a New Duo or Group, Album of the Year, Song of the Year and Best Produced Record of the Year for their hit song, "Kahit Kailan". By the end of 1997, their debut album had gone triple platinum.

=== Bump!, The Live Album and The Way We Do ===
Not long after in the midst of a flourishing career, South Border found itself in the eye of a storm which called for a conspicuous change in their lineup. Luke Mejares replaced Brix Ferraris on lead vocals. But despite discouraging forecasts, South Border got back on their feet in no time. In a rush of creative adrenaline, the band doubled their efforts to finish their second album called Bump. It featured "Sa 'Yo", a haunting ballad that spoke of a heart's yearning for a loved one and "Reborn", South Border's first attempt at recording an instrumental piece reminiscent of their early jazz influences. In 1999, South Border once again caught the critical eye and received a total of 18 Katha Music awards including Album of the Year, Record of the Year, Best Pop Song, and Best R&B Song—all for the song "Sa 'Yo". The following year, the band released its first live recording which was well received by their fans and drew rave reviews from critics. At the turn of the new millennium, the band once again made waves with the success of "Habang Atin ang Gabi", the theme song from La Vida Rosa, a Rosanna Roces-Diether Ocampo film produced by Star Cinema, and later from Misibis Bay, a Ritz Azul drama series on TV5. The lyrics were written by scriptwriter Armando Lao and the music was composed by Jay Durias, who considers this song to be one of his best compositions and arrangements to date.

The same song became the carrier single for their fourth album, The Way We Do, released in 2001. In November of the same year, South Border staged their biggest major show at the 30,000-seater PSC Track and Field Oval. But in the final quarter of 2002, another surprise jolted South Border's avid followers—the announcement that Mejares was leaving the band to go solo. The search for his replacement was going to be another grueling task.

=== Episode III and present status ===
Having gone through another major change in their lead vocals lineup, the band hired the two vocal talents Vince Alaras and Duncan Ramos. Twenty-six-year-old Alaras was a member of La Salle Green Hills’s Kundirana and was then known as "the boy who sounded like Brian McKnight". The younger Ramos, on the other hand, was a singer from Cebu who often accompanied Gary Valenciano on his shows and tours all over the country.

The two new talents who danced as well as they sang provided a fresh and youthful take on South Border, which has since then come up with hits such as "Rainbow" which first hit the airwaves in 2003 for the promotion of Sharon Cuneta's Metro Manila Film Festival entry, Crying Ladies. South Border's music even dominated television with their song "Ikaw Nga", the love theme from the television series Mulawin. In 2004, the band released their first album under their own independent label. Episode III was a big commercial success and included the hits "The Show" and "Brown Hand Smash" — two songs that gave the group an edgier, danceable R&B sound.

In August 2007, the band officially announced the departure of its two vocalists, Duncan Ramos and Vince Alaras. The band reportedly claimed that the two wanted to pursue solo careers in the future. Both left on good terms with the band. Durias then took responsibility over most of the lead vocals until international singing champion Kell Gatdula (former lead singer of 1990s vocal group Fourmula, later renamed to Formula) came over on the same year. Months later, the rest of the band members sought permanent residence in the United States along with their families. Gatdula left in 2010.

Currently, Jay Durias is the only remaining original member of the band after Ric Junasa left the band sometime in 2012–2013. On the other hand, Vince Alaras briefly reunited with the band between 2013 and 2014.

In 2014, the band signed up with Curve Entertainment Inc, spearheaded by Mr. Narciso Chan of Sony BMG. It also marked the year that Kell Gatdula reunited with South Border.

On June 26, 2020, they were featured as guest performers on The Today Show on NBC and were commented on as "the Boyz II Men of the Philippines".

In 2022, the band performed in political rallies of the Uniteam, in support of President-elect Bongbong Marcos.

== Band members ==
=== Current members ===
- Jay Durias – keyboards, lead vocals, songwriter (1993–present)
- Janno Queyquep – guitar (2012–present)
- Joseph "Otep" Concepcion – drums, percussion (2012–present)
- Manuel Tabuñar – bass guitar (2012–present)
- Johndave Picache – alto saxophone (2022–present)

=== Former members ===
- Brix Ferraris – lead vocals (1993–1998)
- Luke Mejares – lead vocals (1998–2002)
- Duncan Ramos – lead vocals (2002–2007)
- Vince Alaras – lead vocals (2002–2007, 2012–2014)
- Ric Junasa – tenor saxophone, alto saxophone, flute (1993–2012)
- Solomon "Sol" Glass – co-lead vocals (2011–2012)
- Tata Balane – bass guitar (1993–2009)
- Paul Benitez – drums, percussion (1993–2009)
- Butch Victoriano – guitar (1998–2009)
- Pido Lalimarmo – guitar, vocals (1996–1998, 2007–2009)
- Jack Rufo – guitar (1993–1996)
- Rancis de Leon – alto saxophone (2005–2009)
- Benjie "Bagets" Mendez – drums, percussion (2009–2012)
- Maki Ricafort – guitar, vocals (2009–2012)
- Marlowe Mata – bass guitar (2009–2012)
- Edward Picache† – alto saxophone (2012–2022; deceased)
- Kell Gatdula – co-lead vocals (2007–2010, 2014–2021)

== Discography ==
=== Albums ===
==== Studio albums ====
- South Border (1996)
- Bump (1998)
- The Way We Do (2001)
- Episode III (2004)
- Episode III Platinum Edition (2005)

==== Compilation albums ====
- Retrospective (2002)

==== Live albums ====
- South Border: The Live Album (1999)

==== Collaboration albums ====
- Metropop Song Festival 1996 (Infiniti Music (now GMA Music), 1996)
- Ultraelectromagneticjam!: The Music of the Eraserheads (Sony BMG Music Philippines, 2005)
- Tunog Acoustic Vol. 3 (Warner Music Philippines, 2004)
- OPM Love Mix (Star Music, 2004)
- Tunog Kapuso: The Best of GMA Themes Vol. 1 (GMA Records, 2005)
- GV25: The Gary Valenciano All-Star Tribute Collection (Star Music, 2008)
- Telesine: The Greatest TV & Movie Theme Songs (Star Music, 2009)
- All About Love (GMA Records, 2009)
- The Best of Mga Awit Kapuso (GMA Music, 2009)
- 60 Taon ng Musika ng Soap Opera (Star Music, 2010)

=== Notable singles ===
- ”Way of the Plann” (1994 collaboration feat. Mastaplann)
- "May Pag-Ibig Pa Kaya" (1996, a song finalist from the "Metropop Song Festival 1996")
- "Kahit Kailan" (1996)
- "Love of My Life" (1996)
- "Tear to Fall" (1996)
- "Mr. Love" (1998)
- "Sa 'Yo" (1998)
- "Tulog" (1998)
- "Do You Believe in Me" (1999, cover From Eric Gadd)
- "Habang Atin Ang Gabi" (2001)
- "The Way We Do" (2001)
- "Usahay" (2003, cover From Pilita Corrales)
- "Rainbow" (2003, theme from the hit blockbuster movie, "Crying Ladies")
- "Wherever You Are" (2004)
- "The Show" (2004)
- "Ikaw Nga" (2004, theme from the hit TV action fantasy series, Mulawin; parody cover by Michael V. as "Isaw Nga")
- "With a Smile" (2005, cover from Eraserheads & also included in the compilation album "UltraelectromagneticJam")
- "Asa" (2005, theme from the hit TV action fantasy series, "Sugo")

== Awards and nominations ==
Year	Award-giving body	Category	Nominated work	Results
1997	10th Awit Awards	Song of the Year	"Kahit Kailan"	Won
1997	10th Awit Awards	Album of the Year	South Border	Won
1997	10th Awit Awards	Best Produced Record of the Year	"Kahit Kailan"	Won
1997	10th Awit Awards	Best Performance by a New Duo or Group Recording Artist	"Kahit Kailan"	Won
1997	3rd Katha Music Awards	Record of the Year	"Kahit Kailan"	Won
1997	3rd Katha Music Awards	Song of the Year	"Kahit Kailan"	Won
1999	5th Katha Music Awards	Song of the Year	"Sa 'Yo"	Won
2002	8th Katha Music Awards	Best Pop Song	"Habang Atin ang Gabi"	Won
2002	8th Katha Music Awards	Best Engineered Recording	"Habang Atin ang Gabi"	Won
2002	8th Katha Music Awards	Best Pop Album	The Way We Do	Won
2005	18th Awit Awards	Best Song Written for Movie/TV/Stage Play	"Ikaw Nga"	Won
2005	18th Awit Awards	Best R & B	"The Show"	Won
2005	18th Awit Awards	Best Dance	"The Show"	Won
2005	18th Awit Awards	Best Inspirational Recording	"Rainbow"	Won
2005	18th Awit Awards	Best Performance by a Group Recording Artist	"Rainbow"	Won
2005	18th Awit Awards	Song of The Year	"Rainbow"	Won
2005	18th Awit Awards	Album of the Year	Episode III	Won
2005	18th Awit Awards	Best Regional Recording	"Usahay"	Won
2005	18th Awit Awards	Best Ballad	"Rainbow" & "Wherever You Are"	Nominated
2006	MYX Music Awards	Favorite Collaboration	"Sweet" with Jinky Vidal	Nominated
2006	MYX Music Awards	Favorite Urban Video	"Sweet" with Jinky Vidal	Nominated
