= Private Affair (album) =

Studio album by Kyla
- Released: November 30, 2010
- Recorded: 2010
- Genre: Pop, R&B, jazz
- Length: 46:59
- Language: English, Tagalog
- Label: EMI Philippines/PolyEast
- Producer: Jesmon Chua (executive), Kyla, Chito Ilagan, Karel Honasan, Jay R, Billy Crawford, Kris Lawrence, Jimmy Muna

Kyla chronology
Heart 2 Heart (2008)	Private Affair (2010)	Journey (2014)

Singles from Private Affair
- 1. "Mahal Kita (Di Mo Pansin)" Released: November 26, 2010; 2. "Don't Tie Me Down" Released: January 2011; 3. "How Deep Is Your Love" Released: November 16, 2011

Private Affair is the eighth studio album of Filipino singer Kyla, released in the Philippines on November 30, 2010, by PolyEast Records. After successfully promoting her albums in Malaysia and Indonesia, it was announced that Kyla was planning to release a new album with her label in early 2010. Originally slated for a May 2010 release, the album's release date was pushed back to September. Due to heightened international activity, it was, again, pushed back to November 2010.

== Production ==
In recording the album, Kyla hoped to produce songs that sounded like vintage Motown with "old school R&B, jazz and pop." It is "composed mostly of melodic ballads" with few upbeat and mid-tempo tracks added. She included one cover in the album, Bee Gees' "How Deep Is Your Love", which features acoustic guitars and is a personal favorite of her partner, Rich Alvarez.

Kyla, along with Jay R, Kris Lawrence and Billy Crawford, wrote and produced the track "Don't Tie Me Down". "A Song for the Love in Summer" was written by her father.

== Singles ==
- "Mahal Kita (Di Mo Pansin)" was released as the album's lead single on November 26, 2010. Kyla launched the album in Party Pilipinas on December 12, 2010, where she performed the song. It is described as a "throwback to the 1950s and 1960s" with its jazzy, R&B, and soul elements. The music video for the song was directed by Treb Monteras, and was released on December 17, 2010.
- "Don't Tie Me Down" became the second single and was released in January 2011. The "house mix" version of the song was also released alongside the single and was used in its music video to promote it. The video features Kyla waking up in the morning and heading out to the bay to ride a yacht with her friends. It ends at night time where she can be seen partying and then falling asleep.
- "Keep the Faith" was initially announced as the album's third single on MYX's official website on August 19.; however "How Deep Is Your Love" was then announced as the next single from the album. The music video was released on November 16, 2011. The video features Kyla walking around the beach with her then fiancé, now husband Rich Alvarez.

=== Official music videos ===
Year	Music video	Length	Album	Official MV on YouTube	Note
2014	"Mahal Kita (Di Mo Pansin)"	3:53	Private Affair	Official Music Video by PolyEast on YouTube; Official Music Video on YouTube	
2014	"Don't Tie Me Down"	3:54	Private Affair	Remix - Music Video on YouTube	
2014	"How Deep is Your Love"	4:00	Private Affair	Official Video on YouTube	Promotional Video

== Awards and nominations ==
The first single, "Mahal Kita (Di Mo Pasin)" has been received three nominations at the 24th Awit Awards:

- Best Performance by a Female Recording Artist
- Best R&B Recording
- Best Vocal Arrangement

"Don't Tie Me Down" her second single has also been nominated for

- Best Dance Recording

== Track listing ==
No.	Title	Writer(s)	Length
1.	"Listen"	Christine Bendebel	4:14
2.	"Mahal Kita (Di Mo Pansin)"	Francis Louis Salazar	3:53
3.	"Dagli na Lang"	Francis Louis Salazar	4:28
4.	"Don't Tie Me Down"	Kyla, Jay R Sillona, Billy Crawford, Kris Lawrence, Jimmy Muna	3:54
5.	"How Deep Is Your Love"	Barry Gibb, Robin Gibb, Maurice Gibb	4:00
6.	"Private Affair"	Bendebel	4:24
7.	"Camouflage"	Yosha Honasan, Karel Honasan	3:11
8.	"It's All About Us"	Francis Louis Salazar	3:33
9.	"A Song for the Love in Summer"	Ulysis Calumpad	4:53
10.	"Keep the Faith"	Moby Aragones	3:36
11.	"Don't Tie Me Down (House Mix)"	Kyla, Sillona, Crawford, Lawrence, Muna	6:49

Notes

- Track 2 in English is "I Love You (You Don't Notice)".
- Track 3 in English is "So Suddenly".
- Track 5 is a cover of a Bee Gees song.
- Track 11 was released as the album's second single but was credited as simply "Don't Tie Me Down", the title of Track 4.

== Release history ==
Country	Date	Label	Format
Philippines	November 30, 2010	EMI PolyEast Records	CD, digital download
