= Beautiful Days (album) =

Studio album by Kyla
- Released: June 3, 2006 (Philippines)
- Recorded: 2006
- Genres: R&B, Soul
- Languages: English, Tagalog
- Label: EMI Philippines
- Producers: Christopher Sy (Executive); Francis Guevarra

Kyla chronology
| Not Your Ordinary Girl (2004) | Beautiful Days (2006) | Heartfelt (2007) |

Singles from Beautiful Days
- 1. "Ngayong Wala Ka Na" Released: 2006; 2. "Beautiful Days" Released: 2006; 3. "Nasaan Ka Na" Released: 2006; 4. "I Wish You Love" Released: 2007

Professional ratings
Review scores
| Source | Rating |
|---|---|
| Titik Pilipino | 3.5/5 stars |
| Original Pinoy Musikahan | 4/5 stars |

Beautiful Days is the fifth studio album by Kyla. It was released by EMI Philippines on June 3, 2006. The album includes the single Beautiful Days written by Kyla herself with producer Jonathan Manalo inspired from her boyfriend Rich Alvarez and the main theme song of weekly TV series Now & Forever aired over GMA Network with the same title.

== Track listing ==
| No. | Title | Writer(s) | Original artist(s) | Length |
|---|---|---|---|---|
| 1. | "Beautiful Days" | Kyla, Jonathan Manalo | Kyla | 4:20 |
| 2. | "Cupid" | Daron Jones, Marvin Scandrick, Michael Keith | 112 | 4:09 |
| 3. | "Ngayong Wala Ka Na" | Diana Dayao, Jason Balibay, Keith Martin | Kyla | 4:50 |
| 4. | "Doin' Just Fine" | Shawn Stockman | Boyz II Men | 4:58 |
| 5. | "Nasaan Ka Na" | Arnie Mendaros | Kyla | 4:42 |
| 6. | "I Wish I Wasn't" | Wright James Quenton, Harris James Samuel, Lewis Terry Steven | Heather Headley | 5:15 |
| 7. | "Feel" | Carstein Shack, Kenneth Karin, Tamara Savage | Kyla | 3:51 |
| 8. | "The Hurt I'd Go Through" | Aliyah Parks, Keith Martin | Kyla | 3:31 |
| 9. | "Love is" | Duncan Hines, Keith Martin, Latavia Horton | Kyla | 4:46 |
| 10. | "I Wish You Love" | Greg Caro | Kyla | 3:25 |
| 11. | "How Am I Gonna Tell" | Kyla (Melanie Calumpad) | Kyla | 3:11 |
| 12. | "Without You" | Laney Stewart, Orenthal Harper, Katrina Willis, Traci Hale, Thabisco Nkhereanye | Charlie Wilson | 5:04 |
| 13. | "Now And Forever" | Vince De Guzman | Kyla | 3:19 |
| 14. | "Say That You Love Me" (featuring Jay R) | Allan Ayque, Louie Ocampo | Basil Valdez | 4:48 |

== See also ==
- Kyla discography
