= Journey (Kyla EP) =

EP by Kyla
- Released: May 10, 2014; April 29, 2014 (digital download via Spinnr.ph)
- Recorded: 2013–2014
- Genre: R&B, pop
- Length: 21:59
- Language: English, Tagalog
- Label: EMI Philippines/PolyEast

Kyla chronology
Private Affair (2010)	Journey (2014)	Kyla (The Queen of R&B) (2018)

Singles from Journey
- 1. "Kunwa-kunwari Lang" Released: April 10, 2014; 2. "Dito Na Lang" Released: May 22, 2014; 3. "My Heart" Released: 2015; 4. "Atin ang Walang Hanggan" Released: April 29, 2015

Journey is an EP by Filipino R&B/pop singer Kyla released on May 10, 2014. It is Kyla's first EP and was distributed by PolyEast Records.

== Development ==
Shortly after her return in late 2013, Kyla began recording a new album. In March 2014, Kyla renewed her contract with EMI Philippines/PolyEast Records.

Kyla performed the album's first single, "Kunwa-kunwari Lang" in the Grand Finals of Myx Philippines' Myx VJ Search last April 8, 2014 at the Alphonse Bar in Ortigas, Pasig. On April 10, PolyEast Records released a lyric video of the single. On April 24, PolyEast announced that Kyla's album will be released on May 10, 2014.

A week before its release, the EP was made available for download on Spinnr on April 29 and iTunes on May 2, 2014.

== Singles ==
- "Kunwa-Kunwari Lang" was released as the first single of Journey on April 10, 2014. Kyla first performed the song on the April 8 episode of Myx's Myx VJ Search. As with several of her music videos, its official music video was directed by Treb Monteras II and was released on June 19, 2014.
- "Dito Na Lang", due to its critical reception and chart performance, was released as the second single of Journey. Kyla announced its release during a guest appearance at DZMM on May 22, 2014. Its music video was shot along with "Kunwa-Kunwari Lang" to be released soon after. Kyla also promoted the new single on the July 22 episode of Kris TV. PolyEast released its official music video on July 31, 2014.

=== Official music and lyric videos ===
Year	Music video	Length	Album	Official MV on YouTube	Note
2014	"Kunwa-Kunwari Lang"	3:49	Journey	Official Music Video on YouTube	
2014	"Dito Na Lang"	3:34	Journey	Official Music Video on YouTube	
2014	"Atin ang Walang Hanggang"	3:53	Journey	Official Video on YouTube	Promotional Lyric Video
2014	"Journey"	4:11	Journey	Official Video on YouTube	Promotional Lyric Video

== Track listing ==
No.	Title	Writer(s)	Length
1.	"Kunwa-Kunwari Lang"	Jungee Marcelo, Francis Kiko Salazar	3:49
2.	"Journey"	Kyla, Jay R, Kettle Mata	4:11
3.	"Dito Na Lang"	Francis Kiko Salazar	3:34
4.	"I Got This"	Kyla, Yosha Honasan	3:04
5.	"My Heart (featuring Brian McKnight)"	Brian McKnight	4:08
6.	"Atin ang Walang Hanggang (English trans: "Forever Is Ours")"	Jungee Marcelo	3:53

Notes

- "My Heart" was written by Brian McKnight in 2011 for Kyla's wedding.

=== Repackaged Edition ===
On September 17, PolyEast announced that a Repackaged Edition of Journey will be released featuring three new songs: "Salbabida", "You Are Not Alone" featuring Jay R, and the solo version of "My Heart". Journey: The Repackaged Edition was officially released on October 27, 2014.

== Track listing ==
No.	Title	Writer(s)	Length
1.	"Kunwa-Kunwari Lang"	Jungee Marcelo, Francis Kiko Salazar	3:49
2.	"Journey"	Kyla, Jay R, Kettle Mata	4:11
3.	"Dito Na Lang"	Francis Kiko Salazar	3:34
4.	"I Got This"	Kyla, Yosha Honasan	3:04
5.	"My Heart (featuring Brian McKnight)"	Brian McKnight	4:08
6.	"Atin ang Walang Hanggang"	Jungee Marcelo	3:53
7.	"You Are Not Alone"	Ron Roker, Jez Davies, Jay R	4:10
8.	"My Heart (solo version)"	Brian McKnight	4:08
9.	"Salbabida"	Jungee Marcelo	5:00
