= MTV Pilipinas for Video of the Year =

Philippine music award

The following is a list of MTV Pilipinas winners for Video of the Year.

Year	Artist	Video	Reference
2006	Sandwich	Sugod	
2005	Radioactive Sago Project	Astro	
2004	Gloc 9	Sayang	
2003	Kamikazee	Lucky	
2002	Rivermaya	Umaaraw, Umuulan	
2001	Kyla	Hanggang Ngayon	
2000	True Faith	Awit Para sa Kanya	
1999	Parokya ni Edgar	Harana	
