= Kyla (album) =

Studio album by Kyla
- Released: 2001 (Philippines)
- Recorded: 2001
- Genre: R&B, Soul, Pop
- Length: 51:54
- Language: English, Tagalog
- Label: Poly East Records; EMI Music (Philippines)
- Producer: Jose Vicente Colayco (executive); Chuck Isidro (supervising producer); Francis Guevarra, Jr.

Kyla chronology
Way To Your Heart (2000)	Kyla (2001)	I Will Be There (2003)

Singles from Kyla
- 1. "I Feel For You" Released: April 2001; 2. "Umulan Man O Umaraw" Released: June 2001

Kyla is the second self-titled studio album by Filipino R&B singer Kyla, released by Poly East Records under EMI Philippines in 2002.

The album carrier single is I Feel For You written by Edwin Marollano and produced by Francis Guevarra, Jr.

== Track listing ==
No.	Title	Writer(s)	Arranger(s)	Length
1.	"I Feel For You"	Edwin Marollano	Yong Nalasa	04:33
2.	"Oooh Your Love"	Arnie Mendaros	Francis Guevarra	04:36
3.	"Ibalik Ang Panahon"	Arnie Mendaros	Jun Tamayo	03:56
4.	"I'm In To You"	Kyla (Melanie Calumpad)	Francis Guevarra	05:12
5.	"Umulan Man O Umaraw"	Louie Ignacio	Ferdie Marquez	03:50
6.	"Bakit Ikaw Pa"	Arnie Mendaros	Francis Guevarra	04:28
7.	"Tanging Pag-ibig Ko"	Arnie Mendaros	Yong Nalasa	04:20
8.	"This Day..."	Kyla (Melanie Calumpad)	Francis Guevarra	03:50
9.	"Sa Iyong Paglayo"	Arnie Mendaros	Ferdie Marquez	04:16
10.	"Ikaw Pa Rin"	Arnie Mendaros	Ferdie Marquez	05:07
11.	"’ Til I Got You"	Arnie Mendaros	Francis Guevarra	04:01
12.	"Hanggang Ngayon (remix)^{1}"	Arnie Mendaros	Lee Andre Katindoy, Francis Guevarra	03:45

^{1} the original version is from Way To Your Heart album

== Album Credits ==
Personnel

- Jose Vicente Colayco – executive producer
- Chuck Isidro – supervising producer
- Francis Guevarra, Jr. – producer
- Jo Tomas – digital graphics, lay-out design
- Jay Javier – photography
- Heidi – hair, make-up (Bambi Fuentes Salon)

Production

- Melanie Calumpad (Kyla) – vocals, background vocals
- Arnie Mendaros – background vocals, vocal arrangement
- Bogie Manipon – vocal dubbing (Cloud 9 Recording Studio)
- Gerry Samson – vocal dubbing (Jam Creations)
- Ferdie Marquez – arranger, mixing, mastering (FLIPTECH Recording Studio)
- Francis Guevarra, Jr. – arranger
- Yong Nalasa – arranger
- Jun Tamayo – arranger
- Lee Andre Katindoy – arranger, mixing

== See also ==
- Kyla discography
