= Not Your Ordinary Girl =

Studio album by Kyla
- Released: May 2004 (Philippines)
- Recorded: 2004
- Genres: R&B; soul; pop
- Length: 63:26
- Languages: English, Tagalog
- Labels: Poly East Records; EMI Music; EMI Philippines
- Producers: Christopher Sy (Executive); Francis Guevarra

Kyla chronology
| I Will Be There (2003) | Not Your Ordinary Girl (2004) | Beautiful Days (2006) |

Singles from Not Your Ordinary Girl
- 1. "Because of You" Released: 2004; 2. "Human Nature" Released: 2004; 3. "If the Feeling Is Gone" Released: 2004; 4. "Not Your Ordinary Girl" Released: 2004; 5. "'Till They Take My Heart Away" Released: 2005

Alternative Covers
- Not Your Ordinary Girl (Special Edition)

Professional ratings
Review scores
| Source | Rating |
|---|---|
| Titik Pilipino | 4.5/5 stars |

Not Your Ordinary Girl is the fourth studio album by Kyla, released in 2004 by PolyEast Records under EMI Philippines.

The album spawned five singles: "Because of You", "Human Nature", "If the Feeling Is Gone", "Not Your Ordinary Girl", and "Till They Take My Heart Away". The album also includes the song "Buti Na Lang", interpreted by Kyla and penned by producer Jonathan Manalo which placed third at the 2003 Metro Pop Song Festival.

== Track listing ==
| No. | Title | Writer(s) | Arranger(s) | Length |
|---|---|---|---|---|
| 1. | "Someone to Love" | Keith Martin | Keith Martin | 4:30 |
| 2. | "Human Nature" | John Betis, Steve Porcaro | Ferdie Marquez | 4:03 |
| 3. | "When I'm with You" | Keith Martin | Keith Martin | 4:31 |
| 4. | "Make Me Whole" | Amel Larrieux, Laru Larrieux | Ferdie Marquez | 4:19 |
| 5. | "Not Your Ordinary Girl" (featuring Jimmy Muna) | Jay R, Jimmy Martinez | Jay R, Jimmy Martinez | 4:06 |
| 6. | "If the Feeling Is Gone" | Jimmy Borja | Ferdie Marquez | 3:34 |
| 7. | "Only for You" (featuring Keith Martin) | Keith Martin | Keith Martin | 4:40 |
| 8. | "What More Can I Say" | Gary Valenciano | Arnie Mendaros | 4:30 |
| 9. | "Making Me Crazy" | Jay R, Jimmy Martinez | Jay R, Jimmy Martinez | 3:54 |
| 10. | "'Til They Take My Heart Away" | Clair Marlo, Steve Porcaro | Arnel Layug | 3:54 |
| 11. | "Something About You" (featuring Thor) | Artstrong Clarion | Artstrong Clarion | 3:53 |
| 12. | "Hindi Mo Ba Alam" (featuring PKSO) | Paul Sirate (PKSO), Seven Shots of Wisdom | DJ Rocky Rock, Paul Sirate | 4:20 |
| 13. | "I'm All Yours" | Rachel Lampa, Paige Lewis, Natalie Larue, Phillip Larue | Ferdie Marquez | 4:29 |
| 14. | "Buti Na Lang" | Jonathan Manalo | Arnold Buena | 3:53 |
| 15. | "Because of You" | Keith Martin | Ferdie Marquez | 4:50 |

Repackaged Special Edition (2005)
| No. | Title | Writer(s) | Length |
|---|---|---|---|
| 16. | "Human Nature (video)" | John Betis, Steve Porcaro |
| 17. | "Not Your Ordinary Girl (video)" | Jay R, Jimmy Martinez |
| 18. | "If the Feeling Is Gone (video)" | Jimmy Borja |
| 19. | "Let the Love Begin" (featuring Jerome John Hughes) | Gloria Sklerox, Lennie Macaluso |
| 20. | "If the Feeling Is Gone (minus one)" | Jimmy Borja |

Notes

- "Human Nature" (track 2) is originally by Michael Jackson from the album Thriller (1982).
- "Make Me Whole" (track 4) is originally by Amel Larrieux from the album Infinite Possibilities (2000).
- "If the Feeling Is Gone" (track 6) is originally by Ella Mae Saison from the album Language of Soul (1992).
- "What More Can I Say" (track 8) is originally by Gary Valenciano from the album Moving Thoughts (1987).
- "I'm All Yours" (track 13) is originally by Rachael Lampa from the album Kaleidoscope (2002).
- "Buti Na Lang" (track 14) was an official entry at the 2003 Metro Pop Song Festival.
- "'Til They Take My Heart Away" (track 10) is originally by Clair Marlo from the album Let It Go (1989).

== See also ==
- Kyla discography
