= Heart 2 Heart (Kyla album) =

Studio album by Kyla
- Released: August 1, 2008 (Philippines)
- Recorded: 2008
- Genre: R&B, soul, jazz, pop
- Language: English, Tagalog
- Label: EMI Music Philippines; Poly East Records
- Producer: Ramon Chuaying (executive); Chito Ilagan; Jay R Sillona & Smash Brothaz; Kyla (co-producer)

Kyla chronology
Heartfelt (2007)	Heart 2 Heart (2008)	Private Affair (2010)

Singles from Heart 2 Heart
- 1. "Heart To Heart" Released: 2008; 2. "Old Friend" Released: 2009; 3. "Back In Time (featuring Jay R)" Released: 2009

Heart 2 Heart is the seventh studio album by Filipino R&B singer Kyla, released in August 2008 by EMI Music Philippines and Poly East Records in CD and cassette format and digitally on June 11, 2009. Like the previous album Heartfelt, it also consists mostly of covers.

The album was produced by Chito Ilagan and Jay R Sillona with his team Smash Brothaz, and co-produced by Kyla herself. Heart 2 Heart also includes original OPM materials like "You Make Me Feel" and "Back In Time", both of which Kyla wrote with Jay R.

The single "Back In Time" won several awards including "OPM Song Of The Year" at the RX 93.1 Awards, "Best Collaboration Award" at the Wave 89.1 Urban Music Awards and in 2010 for "Favorite Song" at the MYX Music Awards.

== Track listing ==
All tracks were produced by Chito Ilagan except for Back In Time produced by Jay R and Smash Brothaz.

Disc 1: Heart 2 Heart
No.	Title	Writer(s)	Original artist(s)	Length
1.	"Heart To Heart"	David Foster, Kenny Loggins, Michael McDonald	Kenny Loggins	5:12
2.	"I Miss You"	Lynn Malsby	Klymaxx	4:43
3.	"Old Friend"	Thom Bell, Linda Creed	Phyllis Hyman	4:28
4.	"Love On A Two Way Street"	Bert Keyes, Sylvia Robinson	Lezli Valentine	4:07
5.	"I'll Never Give Up"	Amy Holland, Jeff Day	Amy Holland	3:52
6.	"Stay Awake"	Ronnie Laws	Ronnie Laws	3:35
7.	"I'll Be Over You"	Randy Goodrum, Steve Lukather	Toto	4:17
8.	"You Make Me Feel"	Kyla (Melanie Calumpad), Jay R Sillona, Jimmy Martinez	Kyla	3:37
9.	"Drive"	Ric Ocasek	The Cars	3:53
10.	"I Can't Tell You Why"	Glenn Frey, Don Henley, Timothy B. Schmit	The Eagles	3:20
11.	"Tahan Na" (featuring DK Tijam)	Toto Sorioso	Kyla	5:03
12.	"Misty Glass Window"	Pido Lalimarmo	Artstart	3:59
13.	"Bus Stop"	Graham Gouldman	The Hollies	4:35
14.	"Back in Time" (featuring Jay R)	Jay R Sillona	Kyla & Jay R	3:58
15.	"Ribbon In The Sky"	Stevie Wonder	Stevie Wonder	4:06
16.	"Grown-Up Christmas List" (bonus track)	David Foster, Linda Thompson-Jenner	David Foster	4:19

Disc 2: Heart 2 Heart (Minus One)

== Awards ==
- Awit Awards
  - Best Collaboration: "Back In Time" with Jay R
  - Best R&B: You Make Me Feel
  - Best Musical Arrangement: Ribbon In The Sky (Musical Arranger: Bobby Velasco)
  - Best Vocal Arrangement: Ribbon In The Sky (Vocal Arranger : Arnie Mendaros)
- MYX Music Awards:
  - Favorite Song: "Back in Time" with Jay R
  - Favorite Mellow Video: Old Friend
  - Favorite Female Artist (nominated)
  - Favorite Collaboration (with Jay-R) (nominated)
  - Favorite Remake -Heart 2 Heart (nominated)
- RX 93.1 Awards:
  - OPM Song of the Year: "Back In Time" (feat Jay R)
- Wave 89.1 Urban Music Awards
  - Best Collaboration: "Back in Time" with Jay-R
- 1st Star Awards for Music
  - Best R&B album

== Personnel ==
Adapted from the album credits.

- Ramon Chuaying - executive producer
- Chito Ilagan - album producer
- Jay R Sillona - producer, arranger
- Smash Brothaz - producer, arranger
- Kyla - co-producer
- Ethel Cachapero - domestic label manager
- Arleen Zabala - assistant domestic label manager
- Willie A. Monzon - sleeve design and art direction
- Mark Nicdao - photography
- Mervin Lazaro - stylist
- Christine Bunyi a.k.a. TINTIN - hair & make-up artist
- Efren San Pedro - recording engineer
- Nikki Cunanan - mixing engineer
- Kyla - vocals, background vocals
- Arnie Mendaros - vocal arranger, vocal coach
- Jay R Sillona - arranger, vocals
- Smash Brothaz - arranger
- Albert Tamayo - arranger
- Mon Faustino - arranger
- Jimmy Antiporda - arranger
- Bimbo Yance - arranger
- Bobby Velasco - arranger
- Karel Honasan - arranger
- Toto Sorioso - arranger
- Kakoi Legaspi - arranger, harmonica
- Francis De Leon - saxophone
- Ric Mercado - guitars
- Kettle Mata - guitars
- Meong Pacana - bass
- Boyet Aquino - drums
- Jay Durias - keyboards
- Michael Alba - percussions
