= Heartfelt (Kyla album) =

Studio album by Kyla
- Released: October 2007
- Recorded: 2007
- Genre: Pop; R&B; soul
- Language: English
- Label: EMI Music (Philippines); Poly East Records
- Producer: Christopher Sy (executive); Francis Guevarra, Jr.

Kyla chronology
Beautiful Days (2006)	Heartfelt (2007)	Heart 2 Heart (2008)

Singles from Beautiful Days
- 1. "Love Will Lead You Back" Released: 2007; 2. "I Don't Want You To Go" Released: 2008; 3. "One Day In Your Life" Released: 2008; 4. "It's Over Now" Released: 2008; 5. "If I Were You" Released: 2008

Heartfelt is the sixth studio album by R&B singer Kyla. It was released by EMI Philippines in October 2007 in audio CD & cassette format and digital.

Composed of 16 cover songs and one original song, it is Kyla's first album of remakes.

== Track listing ==
No.	Title	Writer(s)	Original artist(s)	Length
1.	"I Don't Want You To Go"	Dori Caymmi, Carlo Cesar Pinheiro	Lani Hall	4:22
2.	"Love Will Lead You Back"	Diane Warren	Taylor Dayne	4:58
3.	"I Don't Have The Heart"	Jud J. Friedman, Allan Rich	James Ingram	4:12
4.	"Broken Hearted"	Keith Crouch, Kipper Jones	Brandy	3:46
5.	"Home"	Brian McKnight	Brian McKnight	4:08
6.	"I Miss You So Much"	Babyface, Daryl Simmons	TLC	4:51
7.	"Always And Forever"	Rod Temperton	Heatwave	5:00
8.	"Wait For You"	M. S. Eriksen, T. E. Hermansen, T. Jackson	Elliott Yamin	4:25
9.	"Somewhere Over the Rainbow"	Harold Arlen, E. Y. Harburg	Judy Garland	3:17
10.	"One Day in Your Life"	Renee Armand, Sam Brown	Michael Jackson	4:23
11.	"Someone" (original)	Tamara Savage, Carstein Shack, Kenneth Karin	Kyla	4:16
12.	"Last Chance"	Mariah Carey, Mark Rooney	Allure	4:26
13.	"With This Tear"	Prince	Celine Dion	4:09
14.	"If I Were You"	Shep Crawford, Stacy Dove Daniels, S.T. Jones	Tamia	5:18
15.	"It's Over Now"	Louie Ocampo, Joey Albert, Janice de Belen	Joey Albert	4:02
16.	"For You"	Kenny Lerum	Kenny Lattimore	3:55
17.	"Somewhere Over the Rainbow" (Alternate Version)	Harold Arlen, E. Y. Harburg	Judy Garland	3:30

== Album credits ==
Production

- Francis Guevarra - producer, arranger
- Efren San Pedro - vocals recorded
- Ramil Bahandi - vocals recorded
- Arnie Mendaros- vocal arrangement, back-up
- Kyla - back-up vocals
- Ferdie Marquez - mixed & mastered, arranger
- Bobby Velasco - arranger
- Karel Honasan - arranger
- Bimbo Yance - arranger
- Artstrong - arranger
- Keith Martin - arranger
- Arnel Layug - guitar

Personnel

- Christopher Sy - executive producer
- Estela Paz Cachapero - domestic label manager
- Willie A. Monzon - creative consultant and sleeve design
- Mark Nicdao - photography
- Janet Dela Fuente - styling
- Jonathan Velasco - make up
- Pin Antonio of Salon De Manila - hair styling
- Ramon Esteban - clothes
- John Herrera - clothes

== See also ==
- Kyla discography
