= Way to Your Heart =

Studio album by Kyla
- Released: July 2000 (Philippines)
- Recorded: 2000
- Genre: Pop, R&B
- Language: English, Tagalog
- Label: OctoArts-EMI Music, Inc. EMI Music Philippines
- Producer: Chito Ilacad (executive); Francis Gueverra, Jr. Raymund Ryan

Kyla chronology
Way to Your Heart (2000)	Kyla (2002)

Singles from Way to Your Heart
- 1. "Bring It On" Released: July 2000; 2. "One More Try" Released: July 2000; 3. "Hanggang Ngayon" Released: November 2000; 4. "Nasan Ka?" Released: January 2001

Professional ratings
Review scores
Source	Rating
AllMusic	3/5 stars

Way to Your Heart is the debut album by Filipino R&B singer Kyla, released in 2000. The album consists of ten original OPM tracks mostly written by Mr. Arnie Mendaros. It includes the single Hanggang Ngayon which was nominated at MTV Pilipinas Awards in 2001 for Best Song and music video, Best Direction ( by Lyle Sacris), and Best Video. Kyla also won Best New Artist and Best Female Artist.

The music video also won the MTV Video Music Awards as MTV Southeast Asia 2001 Viewers’ Choice making Kyla the first and the only female artist to win the VMAs making The album also won numerous award at the 16th Awit Awards for the single Hanggang Ngayon for Best Musical Arrangement, Best Performance By A New Female Recording Artist and Music Video Of The Year. Its first single Bring It On also won Best R&B song.

== Track listing ==
All tracks were produced by Francis Guevarra, Jr. except for One More Try which was produced by Raymund Ryan and an entry to the 2000 Metro Pop Song Festival.

No.	Title	Writer(s)	Length
1.	"Bring It On"	Arnie Mendaros	3:44
2.	"Nasan Ka?"	Arnie Mendaros	4:27
3.	"Lost in Paradise"	Arnie Mendaros	3:53
4.	"Summertime"	Arnie Mendaros	3:20
5.	"Blind"	Arnie Mendaros	4:46
6.	"Hanggang Ngayon"	Arnie Mendaros	4:09
7.	"One More Try"	Raymund Ryan	4:14
8.	"All I Need Is You"	Arnie Mendaros	3:42
9.	"Something Special"	Arnie Mendaros	3:02
10.	"Way to Your Heart"	Ferdie Marquez	3:24

== Personnel ==
Adapted from the album credits.

- Chito Ilacad – executive producer
- Francis Guevarra, Jr. – producer
- Willie A. Monzon – art direction

Production

- Melanie Calumpad (Kyla) – lead vocals, background vocals
- Chito Miranda – background vocals
- Ferdie Marquez – guitars, arranger
- Arnel Layug – guitars

== See also ==
- Kyla
- Kyla discography
