= I Will Be There (album) =

Studio album by Kyla
- Released: 2003 (Philippines)
- Recorded: 2003
- Genre: R&B, Soul, Pop
- Language: English, Tagalog
- Label: Poly East Records; EMI Music (Philippines)

Kyla chronology
Kyla (2002)	I Will Be There (2003)	Not Your Ordinary Girl (2004)

Singles from I Will Be There
- 1. "I Will Be There" Released: 2003; 2. "Bounce" Released: 2003; 3. "Flexin'" Released: 2003

I Will Be There is the third studio album by Filipino R&B singer Kyla. The album was released in 2003 thru Poly East Records under EMI Philippines in CD and cassette format and digital. It is one of the albums released by EMI Philippines with copy-protecting compact discs.

The carrier single is "I Will be There" written by actor-songwriter Ogie Alcasid. The album also included songs, Bounce, Always On Time, a song penned by actor-singer Janno Gibbs called Maghihintay Lamang, Flexin' with UK pop vocal group Blue, and a duet with Gary Valenciano for his original song, Sana Maulit Muli, which won Best Performance By A Duet at the 2004 Awit Awards.

== Track listing ==
No.	Title	Writer(s)	Length
1.	"I Will Find You"	Jamir Garcia
2.	"Bounce" (featuring Razor Ray)	Jamir Garcia
3.	"I Will Be There"	Ogie Alcasid
4.	"Let Go"	Lee Andre "Quaizy" O. Katindoy
5.	"Always On Time"	Jonathan Manalo
6.	"Bakit Wala Ka Pa"	Arnie Mendaros
7.	"Let You Go" (featuring Razor Ray)	Jamir Garcia
8.	"Maghihintay Lamang"	Janno Gibbs
9.	"Love To Hate"	Jamir Garcia
10.	"Walang Iba"	Arnie Mendaros
11.	"Here I Stand"	Lee Andre "Aaizy" O. Katindoy
12.	"With You"	Rhada Cuadrado
13.	"Sana Maulit Muli" (with Gary Valenciano)	Gary Valenciano, Angeli Valenciano
14.	"Flexin'" (featuring Blue)	Simon Webbe, David Dawood, Joe Belmaati, Mich Hansen

== Credits ==
Personnel

- Chito Ilacad – executive producer
- Mich Hedin Hansen – producer
- Jasus Ramirez Garcia – producer
- Jonathan Manalo – producer
- Gary Valenciano – producer
- Ogie Alcasid – producer
- Luis Espiritu – stylist

Production

- Melanie Calumpad (Kyla) – lead vocals, background vocals
- Mon Faustino – engineer, string arrangements, keyboard programming, mixing
- Gerry Samson – mastering, mixing, vocal engineer
- Ferdie Marquez – arranger, mastering, mixing
- Jerry Joanino – engineer, mixing
- Arnie Mendaros – vocal arrangement, background vocals
- Mich Hedin Hansen – percussion
- Joe Belmaati – bass, guitars, keyboards, programming
- Arnel Layug – guitars
- Benjie Bautista – violin
- Gary Valenciano – string arrangements
- Jasus Ramirez Garcia – arranger
