= Jay Durias =

- Born: Jay Oliver Durias; August 26, 1976 (age 50); Davao City, Philippines
- Origin: Davao City and Manila, Philippines
- Genres: OPM, pop, R&B
- Occupations: Composer, singer-songwriter, lyricist, producer
- Instruments: Vocals, piano, keyboards, synthesizers, synthaxe
- Years active: 1993–present
- Member of: South Border

Jay Oliver Durias Sr. (born August 26, 1976) is a Filipino singer, songwriter, arranger, keyboardist and record producer of South Border.

== Early life ==
Durias is the frontman of South Border, a pop and R&B band that traces its roots from Davao City. South Border came into national prominence in 1996 when they launched their first self-titled album, which included a Jimmy Antiporda song entitled "May Pag-Ibig Pa Kaya". They interpreted the song at the Metro Manila Pop Music Festival earlier that year. Their song "Kahit Kailan" was awarded 1996 Song of the Year by various radio stations; this gave them their first big hit.

Before the end of 1997, the music of South Border was recognized by friends in the industry, especially when they won the most number of trophies at the 10th Awit Awards. Included in their awards were Best Performance by a New Duo or Group, Album of the Year, Song of the Year and Best Produced Record of the Year for their hit song, "Kahit Kailan". By the end of 1997, their debut album had gone triple platinum.

Lineup changes had occurred when Luke Mejares replaced Brix Ferraris on lead vocals after Ferraris left the band. After a couple of years, the band experienced another change in their lineup when vocalist Luke Mejares left the band. However, the band managed to find two new vocalists, Vince Alaras and Duncan Ramos. With their two new vocalists, the band produced the hits "Rainbow" and Mulawin’s theme song "Ikaw Nga". Edgier and danceable R&B hits like "The Show" and "Brown Hand Smash" also proved to be a commercial success for the band. After the departure of Alaras and Ramos, Durias eventually became the band's sole lead singer.

== Recent work ==
Durias hosts a radio show every Wednesday entitled "Rock-a-bye-Jayd" at Wave 891 (now Adventist World Radio 89.1 Manila), together with DJs Pam and H-Town.

He also covered two songs by Eraserheads; "With a Smile" which appears on the 2005 compilation album, Ultraelectromagneticjam, and "Ang Huling El Bimbo" from the 2012 compilation album, The Reunion.

He covered Basia's 1990 song "Reward" from his 1st solo album in 2009.

He composed "Rainbow" for the film Crying Ladies and "Ikaw Nga" for the TV series Mulawin that was shown previously on GMA Network.

He also appeared in Kalyeserye of Eat Bulaga! wherein he was the wedding singer of the second wedding of Divina and Frankie (YaKie), aired on August 22, 2015.

== Personal life ==
He is married to his wife Helene with two children, Kahlil and Jaydee Durias.
