= Kris Lawrence =

Filipino musician (born 1982)

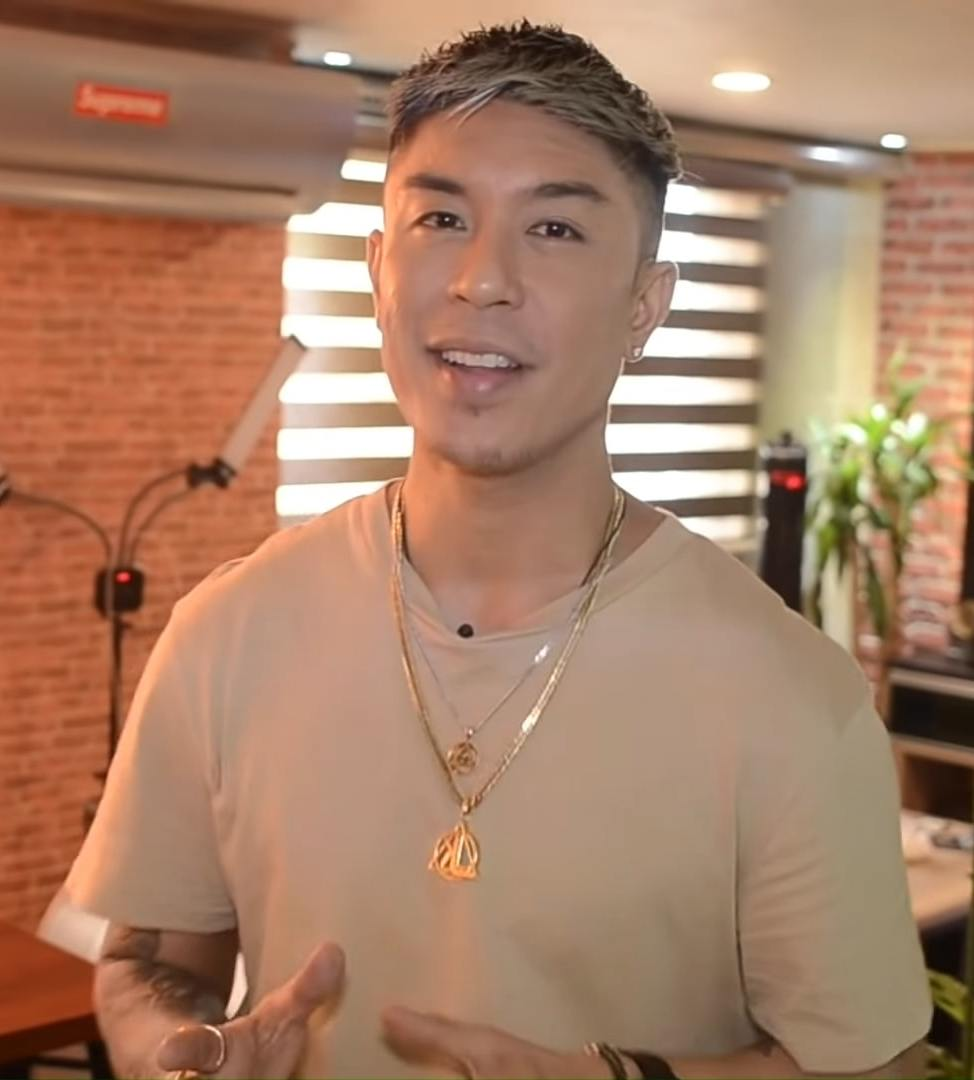
- Lawrence in 2020

Background information
- Born: Kristoffer Lawrence Cadevida (Note: Kris Lawrence is a United States citizen. Thus, he does not possess his mother's maiden name (Protacio) as is the convention in the Philippines.); September 1, 1982 (age 44); Los Angeles, California
- Genres: R&B; soul
- Occupations: Singer-songwriter, actor
- Years active: 1997–present
- Labels: Star; MCA; GMA; Universal

Kristoffer Lawrence Cadevida (born September 1, 1982), commonly known as Kris Lawrence, is a Filipino-American singer-songwriter and actor.

== Early life and career ==
Lawrence was born in Los Angeles, California, United States. He was with Jay-R in the group First Impression from mid-1998 to early 2000. He won Search for the Star in a Million Season 3 in 2006. Lawrence's self-titled debut album was released in 2006, followed by Moments of Love in 2009 which mainly included covers of songs such as George Michael's "Careless Whisper", Richard Marx's "Right Here Waiting" and Christopher Cross's "I Will Take You Forever".

In 2010, he signed an exclusive contract with GMA Network and appeared on the variety show Party Pilipinas. On March 12, 2012, Lawrence signed to GMA Records along with three other artists. Having already made GMA (the Kapuso Network) his home network since early 2010, and now officially joining their roster in music, Lawrence has hinted at his wish for his songs to be used in different shows on GMA.

His third album, Spread the Love, was released in 2013 and his fourth album, Most Requested Playlist was released in 2015 under Universal Records.

Lawrence was commissioned by Daniel Padilla and co-owners to create ambient theme music for J Castles (dubbed "Disneyland of Tanauan") including instrumental and surrealistic soundscape with 3D soundtrack visual effects in each room. Jay Durias also requested Lawrence sing J Castles’ theme song, “Let There Be Lights”, and “Sky Full of Colors” at the fireworks finale of the park's launching.

== Personal life ==
Lawrence was in a relationship with actress and model Katrina Halili with whom he has a daughter born in 2012 named Katie. They broke up in 2014. He then has a second child with a non-showbiz girlfriend born in 2019.

Lawrence has a younger sister, Laurie Cadevida, who played the Vietnamese woman lead role "Kim" on the North American Tour of Miss Saigon.

== Filmography ==
=== Television ===
Year	Title	Role
2005–06	Search for the Star in a Million Season 3	Himself / Contestant
2006–10, 2015–18; 2024	ASAP	Himself / Performer
2007	Your Song I'd Rather (with Jasmine Trias)	Sid
2010	SOP	Himself / Performer
2010–2013	Party Pilipinas	Himself / Performer
2010	Diva	Himself / Guest
2010	Puso ng Pasko: Artista Challenge	Challenger
2012	Showbiz Central	Himself / Live Guest
2012	Chef Boy Logro: Kusina Master	Himself / Guest
2013–15	Sunday All Stars	Himself / Performer
2015	It's Showtime	Himself / Performer
2016	Eat Bulaga!	Himself / Performer
2017	Eat Bulaga! Jackpot En Poy	Himself / Contestant
2021	All-Out Sundays	Himself / Guest Performer
2022	Masked Singer Pilipinas 2	Himself
2025	It's Showtime	Himself / Guest Performer

== Discography ==
=== Studio albums ===
Release date	Title	Label
May 11, 2006	Kris Lawrence	Star Records
June 9, 2009	Moments of Love	MCA Music
January 1, 2013	Spread the Love	GMA Records
August 28, 2015	Most Requested Playlist	Universal Records

=== Compilation albums ===
Release date	Title	Label
2008	Telesine: The Greatest Movie and TV Theme Songs	Star Records
January 24, 2008	Love Life – Life Songs and Life Stories with Boy Abunda	Star Records
December 12, 2007	Maging Sino Ka Man (Original Teleserye Soundtrack)	Star Records
2007	Pinoy Biggie Hits Vol. 3	Star Records
2007	Pinoy Biggie Hits Volume 2	Star Records
2007	Pinoy Biggie Hits	Star Records

=== Singles ===
- "Careless Whisper"
- "When I See You Smile"
- "Kung Malaya Lang Ako"
- "Paano"
- "Ikaw Pala"
- "Sabihin Mo Naman"
- "Isang Numero"
- "Isang Saglit"
- "Ako Nalang"
- "Torpe"
- "Anong Gusto Mo"
- "Just Tell Me You Love Me"

== Awards and nominations ==
Award ceremony	Year	Category	Nominee(s)/work(s)	Result	Ref.
Wish Music Awards	2018	Wishclusive R&B Performance of the Year	"Versace on the Floor"	Nominated	
