= PolyEast Records =

Filipino record label

- Type: Subsidiary
- Industry: Music
- Founded: 1977; 49 years ago (as Canary Records); 1978; 48 years ago (as OctoArts International); 1995; 31 years ago (as OctoArts-EMI Philippines); 2002; 24 years ago (as EMI Philippines); 2009; 17 years ago (as PolyEast Records)
- Headquarters: 3/F, Universal Tower, 1487 Quezon Avenue, West Triangle, Quezon City, Metro Manila, Philippines
- Key people: Ethel Cachapero; Jesmon Chua; Ton Ton Jose; Chito Ilagan; Richard Calderon
- Subsidiaries: Galaxy Records (Philippines); PolyEast Entertainment Group
- Website: Official Website

PolyEast Records (formerly Canary Records, OctoArts International, OctoArts EMI Music Inc. and EMI Philippines) is a Philippine record label in the Philippines. It is a member of the Philippine Association of the Record Industry and from 2008 until 2013, the international licensee of EMI.

== History ==
PolyEast Records was established in 1977 as Canary Records by Orly Ilacad after leaving Vicor Music Corporation due to a major conflict with co-founder and then co-owner Vic del Rosario. Canary Records became OctoArts International in 1978. It was the first record company that introduced "minus one" (music used for karaoke) in the market.

During the 1970s, the releases of EMI Records were distributed in the Philippines by Dyna Records under the name Dyna EMI (later remained in 1992 as Dyna EMI Virgin as a result of EMI's purchase of Virgin Records). OctoArts at that time was the distributor of Sony Music's international releases. In 1995, OctoArts began a distribution deal with EMI and became OctoArts-EMI, leading to the establishment of Sony Music Philippines. In 2002, after a series of restructure, Orly Ilacad sells their stake in the label to EMI full time and it became EMI Philippines, while Ilacad later brought Orbit Music and it eventually becomes OctoArts-Orbit Music.

The PolyEast Records label initially started as a sublabel of PolyGram Philippines (later became part of Universal Music Philippines) until it was eventually acquired by EMI Philippines. It continued being an imprint of the label until 2008 when EMI withdrew from the Southeast Asian market, it became simply PolyEast Records as a joint venture between EMI itself and Piper Paper Corporation.

In the period of 2012–2013, PolyEast became independent for the second time after EMI was absorbed into Universal Music Group (MCA Music for the Filipino market).

== Notable artists ==
- ABC Express
- Bamboo Mañalac
- Bernie Gala
- Bhem Rosas
- Boyfriends
- Brix Ferraris
- Carlo Orosa
- Cristy Mendoza
- David Pomeranz
- Dingdong Avanzado
- Dina Bonnevie
- Eva Eugenio
- Francis Magalona
- Gio Alvarez
- Hale
- Jaime Garchitorena
- Jamie Rivera
- Jennifer Mendoza
- Jessa Zaragoza
- Joey Albert
- Juan Miguel Severo
- Karylle
- Keempee de Leon
- Kulay
- Kyla
- Lea Salonga
- Legit Misfitz
- Manilyn Reynes
- Maribeth Pascua
- Martin Nievera
- Melissa de Leon
- Melissa Gibbs
- Michael V.
- Nora Aunor
- Ogie Alcasid
- Pops Fernandez
- Put3ska
- Ramrods
- Rannie Raymundo
- Renz Verano
- Richard Merck
- Rico J. Puno
- Sandwich
- Side A
- Sugarfree
- Sunshine Cruz
- Slapshock
- Thalía
- The Dawn
- Tito, Vic & Joey
- TJ Monterde
- True Faith
- Urban Flow
- Viktoria
- Vina Morales
- Willie Revillame
- Zia Quizon
- Zsa Zsa Padilla

== Partnerships ==
- Universal Records (Philippines)
- UMG Philippines

== See also ==
- OctoArts Films
- List of record labels
