= The Julia Fordham Collection =

Compilation album by Julia Fordham
- Released: 1998
- Label: Circa; Virgin
- Producer: Julia Fordham; Bill Padley; Grant Mitchell; Kevin Maloney; Hugh Padgham; Larry Klein; Michael Brook; Peter Asher

Julia Fordham chronology
East West (1997)	The Julia Fordham Collection (1998)	Concrete Love (2002)

Professional ratings
Review scores
Source	Rating
AllMusic	4.5/5 stars

The Julia Fordham Collection is the first compilation album by English singer-songwriter Julia Fordham, released in 1998. It covers ten years of Fordham's career, from her 1988 debut album up to the release of the compilation.

== Content ==
The compilation includes selected singles and album tracks from Fordham's first five studio albums: Julia Fordham (1988), Porcelain (1989), Swept (1991), Falling Forward (1994) and East West (1997). Three of the album's tracks are reworked versions, including "Where Does the Time Go? ('98 Version)", which features American singer Curtis Stigers on vocals. Also included are two previously unreleased tracks: "Kid", a newly recorded song for this compilation, and "It Was Nothing That You Said", which was recorded during the East West sessions but not included on the final track listing of that album.

== Track listing ==
All tracks written by Julia Fordham, except where noted.

1. "Happy Ever After" (Rain Forest Mix '98) – original version from Julia Fordham
2. "Where Does the Time Go?" ('98 Version, featuring Curtis Stigers) – original version from Julia Fordham
3. "Manhattan Skyline" – from the US version of Porcelain
4. "Lock & Key" – from Porcelain
5. "Porcelain" – from Porcelain
6. "Girlfriend" – from Porcelain
7. "Falling Forward" (Fordham, John Watkin) – from Falling Forward
8. "I Can't Help Myself" – from Falling Forward
9. "I Thought It Was You" ('98 Mix) – original version from Swept
10. "East West" – from East West
11. "Killing Me Slowly" – from East West
12. "Kid" – previously unreleased
13. "It Was Nothing That You Said" – previously unreleased
14. "(Love Moves in) Mysterious Ways" (Dean Pitchford, Tom Snow) – from Swept
15. "Happy Ever After" (Original Mix) – from Julia Fordham
