= Tappeto Volante =

Studio album by Aktuala
- Released: 1976
- Genre: Jazz
- Label: Bla Bla

Aktuala chronology
La Terra (1974)	Tappeto Volante (1976)

Tappeto Volante ("Flying Carpet") is the third and final album by Italian world music pioneers Aktuala. It was released on Bla Bla records in 1976. It is the second recording of percussionist Trilok Gurtu

== Profile ==
It is a mixture of live and studio recordings, mostly recorded in Morocco after a year spent traveling and playing there. The resulting recordings were then interspersed with studio recordings featuring electronic enhancements. This latter studio compositional style point to Walter Maioli's next project, Futuro Antico in which such mixtures dominated. There are shorter tracks than on the previous recordings but they have segues making a collage effect.

== Musicians ==
The musicians are:

- Walter Maioli: Arabic oboe, wooden flute, naj, bass flute, maranzano, bass harmonica, sil-sil, seeds, desert flute, sea triton, zampogna, reeds, whistles, bells
- Daniele Cavallanti: soprano saxophone, dolak, derbuka
- Antonio Cerantola: acoustic guitar
- Kela Rangoni Macchiavelli: zanza, tamboura, maracas, seeds, rings
- Fabrizio Cassanoi: sitar
- Marjon Klok: harp, tamboura, bells, sil-sil, cymbals
- Trilok Gurtu: tabla, snake drums, Moroccan bongos, cymbals, xylophone, cow bells, sil-sil, wood block

== Track listing ==
The tracks are:

1. Churinga
2. Ohnedaruth
3. Ugula Baliue African Planet
4. Il Ritmo Del Cammello (The Rhythm of the Camel)
5. Hare
6. Mr Trilok
7. Chitarra E Piffero (Guitar and Pipes)
8. Echo Raga
9. Mediterraneo
10. Flash
11. Waruna
12. Aksak
13. Nettuno Dio Del Mare (Neptune God of the Sea)
