= Antico =

Antico may refer to:

== People ==
- Andrea Antico (c. 1480 – after 1538), Renaissance music printer active in Rome; Ottaviano Petrucci's first competitor
- Anthony Antico (1935–2020), American mobster
- Antico Dalton (born 1975), American and Canadian football linebacker
- Tristan Antico (1923–2004), Australian industrialist
- Antico or "L'Antico", nickname of Renaissance sculptor Pier Jacopo Alari Bonacolsi (c. 1460–1528)

== Other ==
- Antico Pizza, pizzeria in Atlanta, Georgia
- Feroleto Antico, town in Calabria
- Monte Antico, village in Tuscany
- Rosso Antico, aperitif
- Stile antico, the use of Renaissance polyphonic style after around 1600, used in distinction to the stile moderno

== See also ==
- Futuro Antico (disambiguation)
