= Walter Maioli =

Walter Maioli (born 1950 in Milan) is an Italian researcher, paleorganologist, poly-instrumentalist, and composer specialized in experimental archaeology and music, in particular that of archaic civilization. He has been researching the music of antiquity and prehistory for more than thirty-five years. Always interested in the music of the Mediterranean, he has gone on journeys to discover the folkloristic Italian and Mediterranean traditions learning the Arabic, African, Oriental, and European music since the beginning of the seventies.

In 1972 he founded the pioneer world music group Aktuala, dedicated to folkloristic African and Asian music.

In the eighties Walter Maioli's research focused on the field of prehistoric instruments; his work was presented at the Archaeological Symposium of Amsterdam for the opening of the Den Haag Museum in The Hague (Den Haag). In 1987 he prepared the Natural Art Laboratory of Morimondo in the Ticino Park, working on the Art of the Nature, publishing books on the subject for the Jaca Book: "Origins, sounds and music", and for Giorgio Mondadori: "Orchestra of the Nature".

In 1991 he displayed the collection called "The Origins of Musical Instruments" to the History of Nature Museum in Milan and presented "Art of the Stars" sounds for the planetarium, at Ulrico Hoelpi Civic Planetarium in Milan in collaboration with Fiorella Terenzi. Starting in 1994, for one and a half years he coordinated the musical part of the Archeon Archaeological Theme Park in Alphen aan den Rijn in the Netherlands, producing the CD called "200.000 years in music".

In 1995 he founded Synaulia, a team of musicians, archeologists, paleorganologists, and choreographers dedicated to the application of their historical research to ancient music and dance, in particular to the ancient Etruscan and Roman periods, carrying out an intense activity of conferences, seminars, and concerts in Europe, in particular in the Netherlands and Germany. In Italy, some of his performances were presented at archaeological sites such as Mausoleo di Augusto, Mercati Traianei, Terme di Diocleziano, Ostia Antica, Villa Adriana, Preneste, Pompei and Stabia, with the scope of recreating the sound atmosphere and executive context of the Roman age. When Michael Hoffman, chose the Synaulia group to participate in the shooting of the movie A Midsummer Night's Dream in 1998, Walter Maioli took care of the reproduction of the musical instruments.

Among the collaborations of Walter Maioli and Synaulia, there are performances with Giorgio Albertazzi: "Eros voglio cantare", "Intorno a Dante", and "Mammi, Pappi e Sirene in Magna Grecia, and the music composition for the first two episodes of the television program on TV RAI 2 "Albertazzi e Fo raccontato la storia del teatro italiano". Two songs of Synaulia were used in Gladiator, directed by Ridley Scott.

Walter Maioli and the Synaulia took care of the musical parts of Rome of BBC-HBO, Empire of ABC and the New Line Cinema's Nativity (2006), as well as other documentaries of the BBC, CNN, Japanese TV, Discovery Channel, National Geographic Society and experimental archaeological videos for the RAI, CNN, Museo Nazionale Etrusco of Villa Giulia in Rome and other museums in Germany. From November 2007 Walter Maioli with the Fondazione Ras has started the laboratory "Synaulia in Stabiae" in Castellamaare di Stabiae.

== Discography ==
- Aktuala, "Aktuala" brani: Altamira and Mammuth R.C., LP – Bla Bla, 1973
- Aktuala, "La Terra" (The Earth), LP – Bla bla, 1974 and CD Artis, 1992
- Aktuala, "Tapetto Volante" (Flying Carpet) LP Bla Bla, 1976, CD Artist 1993
- Futuro Antico, Futuro Antico Cassette K7 Soundcenter 1980
- Walter Maioli "Anthology", 1985, Sound Reporters, Amsterdam
- Art of primitive sound, "Musical instruments from prehistory: the paleolithic, Archeosound XA1001, 1991
- Archeon, "200.000 Jaar Muziek", 1995, Archeon, WTWCD 950301, 1995
- Synaulia, "Music of Ancient Rome, Vol.1 Wind instruments", Amiata Records- ARNR 1396, 1996
- Taraxacum – Espolazione elettronica della NaturaWalter Maioli – Nirodh Fortini, CD – allegato alla rivista Anthropos & Iatria n. 4 – 2001
- Synaulia, CD "Music of Ancient Rome, Vol.2 String instruments", Amiata Records, 2002
- Walter Maioli – I Flauti Etruschi – Tra Mito, Immaginario e Archeologia, Soundcenter – CDS01, 2003
- Walter Maioli – Caverne Sonore – I suoni delle stalattiti e stalagmiti – Toirano and Borgio Verezzi – Liguria, Italy, Soundcenter – CDS02, 2006
- Futuro Antico – "Intonazioni Archetipe", Soundcenter, CDS03, 2007

== Bibliography ==
- Walter Maioli, "Le Origini: Il suono e la musica", Jaca Book, Milano, 1991
- Walter Maioli and Giordano Bianchi, "Suoni e musiche della natura," Cemb-Essegiemme, Milan, 1991
- Walter Maioli and Manuela Stefani, "L'Orchestra della natura", Giorgio Mondadori, Milan, 1991
