= Vinnie Colaiuta =

American drummer (born 1956)

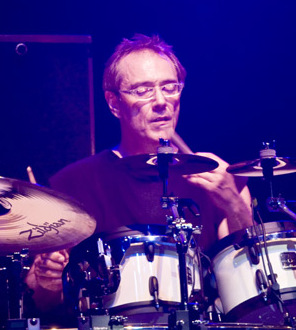
- Colaiuta with Jeff Beck at the Palais Theatre in Australia, 2009

Background information
- Born: February 5, 1956 (age 70); Brownsville, Pennsylvania, U.S.
- Genres: Rock; pop rock; jazz rock; funk rock; country rock; heavy metal
- Occupation: Drummer
- Years active: 1977–present
- Labels: Stretch; Moonjune
- Website: vinniecolaiuta.com

Vincent Peter "Vinnie" Colaiuta (born February 5, 1956) is an American drummer known for his technical mastery who has worked as a session musician in many genres. He was inducted into the Modern Drummer Hall of Fame in 1996 and the Classic Drummer Hall of Fame in 2014. Colaiuta has won one Grammy Award and has been nominated twice. Since the late 1970s, he has recorded and toured with Frank Zappa, Joni Mitchell, and Sting, among many other appearances in the studio and in concert.

== Career ==
Colaiuta was given his first drum kit when he was seven. He took to it naturally, with little instruction. When he was fourteen, the school band teacher gave him a book that taught him some of the basics. Buddy Rich was his favorite drummer until he heard the album Ego by Tony Williams and The Tony Williams Lifetime, an event that changed his life. Colaiuta was also listening to organists, notably Jack McDuff, Jimmy McGriff and Don Patterson.

While a student at Berklee College of Music, when jazz fusion was on the rise, he listened to and admired Alphonse Mouzon and Billy Cobham.

After leaving school, he played local gigs in Boston. He joined a brief tour organized by Al Kooper, then worked in California on an album by Christopher Morris, which Kooper was producing. Although he returned to Boston, Colaiuta was drawn back to California by friends. He took the bus from Boston to Los Angeles during the Great Blizzard of 1978.

After performing in jazz clubs, he won the audition to play drums for Frank Zappa. He toured with Zappa and appeared on the albums Joe's Garage, Tinsel Town Rebellion, and Shut Up 'n Play Yer Guitar. Modern Drummer magazine chose Joe's Garage as one of the top 25 drum performances of all time.

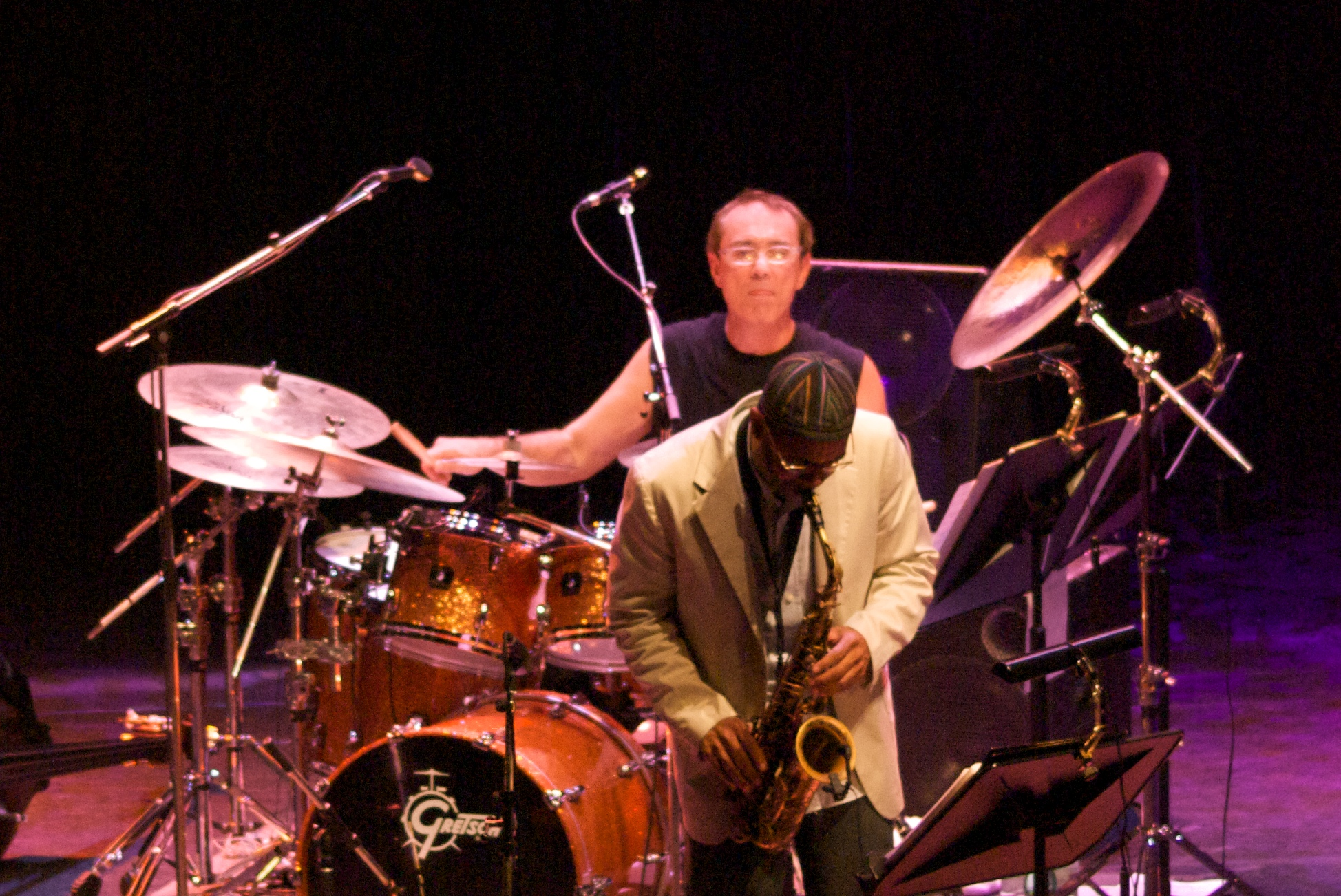
Colaiuta with Kenny Garrett in the Five Peace Band, 2008

In 1981, he ceased touring with Zappa to become a studio musician, recording for the band Pages and pop singer Gino Vannelli. Opportunities arose with saxophonist Tom Scott and bassist Larry Klein, who invited Colaiuta to play on a record by Klein's then-girlfriend, Joni Mitchell. When Klein and Mitchell got married, Colaiuta was the best man at their wedding. During the 1980s, he toured with Mitchell.

In 1986, he became the house drummer of The Late Show Starring Joan Rivers. The band, called the Party Boys and the Tramp, was led by Mark Hudson.

By the end of the 1980s he was recording albums, TV and film work during the day, and playing clubs at night. In addition to pop acts, he has worked with jazz musicians Herbie Hancock, Chick Corea, Buell Neidlinger, and the Buddy Rich Big Band.

In 1990, Colaiuta got a phone call from Sting, flew to England, and won the audition to become a member of his band. The drummer auditions were held in the studio during the mixing for Sting's album The Soul Cages. According to the band's guitarist, Dominic Miller, they held auditions daily for two or three weeks with many talented drummers, including big names like Mark Brzezicki, only for Colaiuta to win the position "in about four seconds" of playing, elaborating that "It wasn't because he was fast or impressive; it was just correct." Colaiuta remained with Sting for much of the 1990s, touring and recording the albums Ten Summoner's Tales (1993), Mercury Falling (1996), Brand New Day (1999) and Sacred Love (2003). In 1994, Colaiuta released his debut solo album.

On November 12, 2016, he played with Sting in the first concert to be held at the Bataclan in Paris since the terrorist attack a year earlier.

He has won over fifteen Drummer of the Year awards from Modern Drummer magazine's annual reader polls. These include ten awards in the "Best Overall" category.

In 2026, Colaiuta was awarded an honorary doctorate from his alma mater, Berklee College of Music, recognizing his contributions to the music industry.

== Equipment ==
Throughout his career, Vinnie Colaiuta has endorsed a variety of drum brands. He began with both Gretsch and Sonor while working with Frank Zappa, then switched to Yamaha drums, which he played for more than ten years during the 1980s and 1990s. Colaiuta returned to Gretsch in the 1990s, staying with them until 2012, when he began endorsing Ludwig drums. In 2014, he briefly worked with Heuer drums before returning to Gretsch for a third time in June 2016.

When he played Yamaha drums, he used Yamaha hardware and pedals. With Gretsch, he switched to Gibraltar hardware and DW bass drum pedals. With Ludwig, he used Ludwig hardware and pedals. When he went back to Gretsch in 2016, he started using all DW hardware and pedals.

He also endorsed Zildjian cymbals and drumsticks for most of his career, helping to create the A Custom cymbal line and having his own signature stick. Starting in 2012, he moved away from Zildjian cymbals and drumsticks, and began endorsing Paiste cymbals and Vic Firth drumsticks.

The next year, he helped develop the Formula 602 Modern Essentials series, blending what Colaiuta liked about the classic Formula 602 with the Signature Traditionals. Vic Firth also released a Vinnie Colaiuta signature stick based on the 5B model. In 2023, he began endorsing Vater drumsticks.

Throughout his career, Colaiuta has used Remo drumheads and Roland electronics.

== Partial discography ==
=== As leader ===
- 1994 Vinnie Colaiuta (Stretch)
- 2018 Descent into Madness (A-Tone Recordings)
- 2021 Mother's Milk (A-Tone Recordings)

==== With Jing Chi ====
(with Robben Ford and Jimmy Haslip)

- 2002 Jing Chi
- 2003 Jing Chi Live at Yoshi's
- 2004 3D
- 2017 Supremo

==== With Mark Isham ====
- 2019 Hard Candy (A-Tone Recordings)

=== As sideman ===
==== With Joni Mitchell ====
- 1982 Wild Things Run Fast
- 1985 Dog Eat Dog
- 1991 Night Ride Home

==== With Tom Scott ====
- 1982 Desire
- 1987 Streamlines
- 1988 Flashpoint
- 1999 Smokin' Section

==== With Sting ====
- 1991 The Soul Cages Concert (on VHS and LaserDisc)
- 1993 Ten Summoner's Tales
- 1996 Mercury Falling
- 1999 Brand New Day
- 2003 Sacred Love
- 2016 57th & 9th

==== With Frank Zappa ====
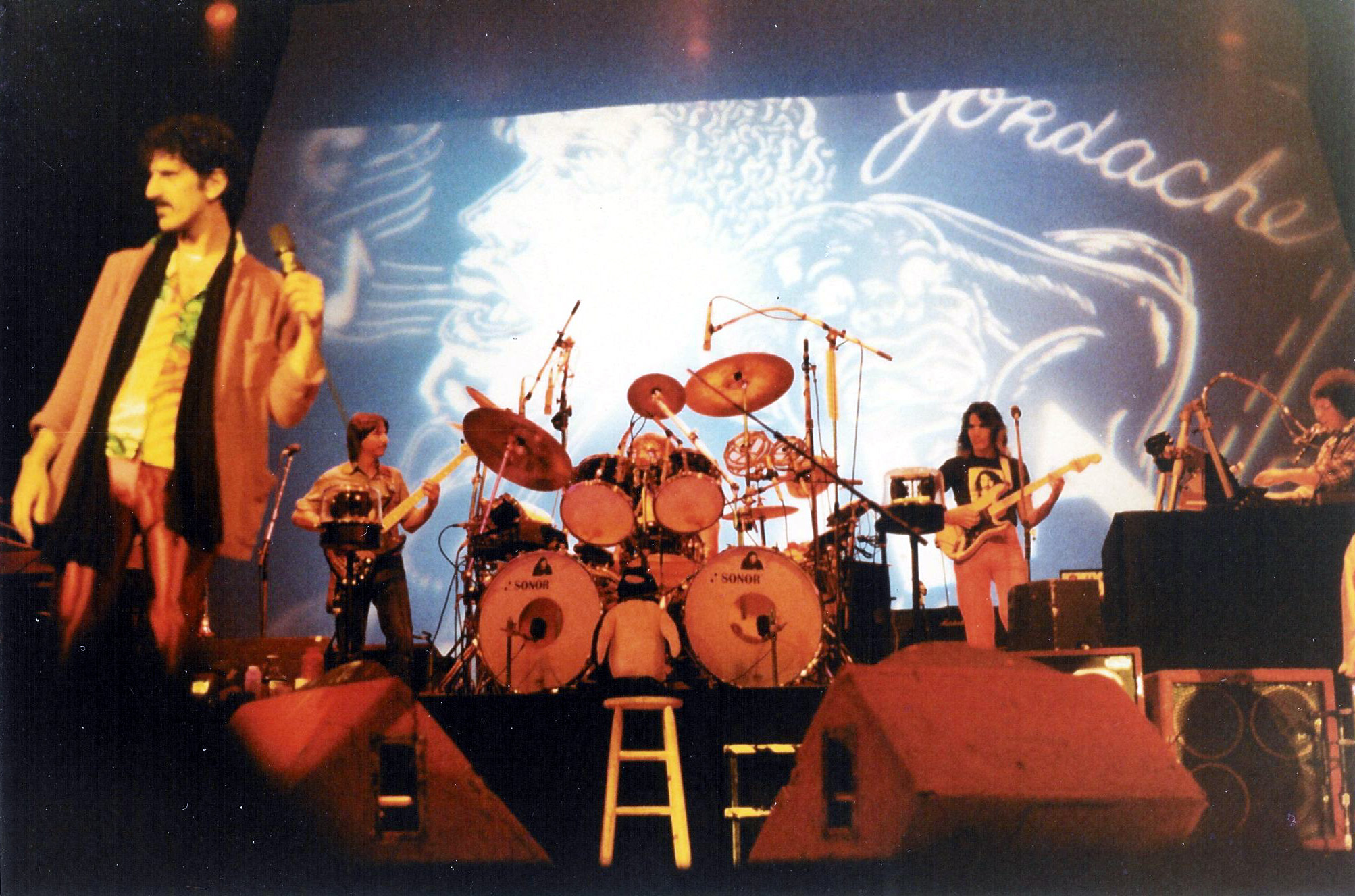
Colaiuta on drums with Frank Zappa at the Memorial Auditorium, Buffalo, NY. October 25, 1980

- 1978 Saarbrucken 1978 (Officially released in 1991 from 1978 bootleg)
- 1979 Joe's Garage
- 1981 Tinsel Town Rebellion
- 1981 Shut Up 'n Play Yer Guitar
- 1983 The Man From Utopia
- 1988 Guitar
- 1991 Any Way the Wind Blows
- 1995 Strictly Commercial
- 1988 You Can't Do That on Stage Anymore, Vol. 1
- 1991 You Can't Do That on Stage Anymore, Vol. 4
- 1992 You Can't Do That on Stage Anymore, Vol. 6
- 1996 The Lost Episodes (1996)
- 1996 Frank Zappa Plays the Music of Frank Zappa: A Memorial Tribute
- 1997 Have I Offended Someone?
- 1999 Son of Cheep Thrills
- 2003 Halloween
- 2006 Trance-Fusion
- 2007 Buffalo
- 2016 Chicago '78

==== With others ====
1980's

- 1981 Nightwalker, Gino Vannelli
- 1982 Tvær Systur, Jakob Magnusson
- 1982 Championship Wrestling, Al Kooper
- 1982 Quiet Lies, Juice Newton
- 1982 Times of Our Lives, Judy Collins
- 1982 Everyman a King, Avalon
- 1983 Dirty Looks, Juice Newton
- 1983 Not the Boy Next Door, Peter Allen
- 1983 Imagination, Helen Reddy
- 1983 Youngblood, Carl Wilson
- 1983 Walk a Fine Line, Paul Anka
- 1984 Emotion, Barbra Streisand
- 1984 Qualifying Heat, Thelma Houston
- 1985 Soul Kiss, Olivia Newton-John
- 1986 Smoke Signals, Smokey Robinson
- 1986 The Bridge, Billy Joel
- 1986 Te Amaré, José Feliciano
- 1987 John Patitucci, John Patitucci
- 1987 Northern Nights, Dan Siegel
- 1987 Famous Blue Raincoat, Jennifer Warnes
- 1987 Swing Street, Barry Manilow
- 1987 Portrait, Lee Ritenour
- 1988 Close-Up, David Sanborn
- 1988 Last Days of the Century, Al Stewart
- 1988 Talk to Your Daughter, Robben Ford
- 1988 The Real Me, Patti Austin
- 1988 I'm Your Man, Leonard Cohen
- 1988 Get Here, Brenda Russell
- 1988 Positive, Peabo Bryson
- 1988 Voices of the Heart, Eric Marienthal
- 1988 Y Kant Tori Read, Tori Amos
- 1988 Bossa Nova Hotel, Michael Sembello
- 1988 Kilimanjaro, The Rippingtons
- 1989 Mr. Jordan, Julian Lennon
- 1989 Music, My Love, Jean-Pierre Rampal
- 1989 Big Harvest, Indio
- 1989 Secrets, Allan Holdsworth
- 1989 Barry Manilow, Barry Manilow
- 1989 The Warmer Side of Cool, Wang Chung
- 1989 The Works, Nik Kershaw
- 1989 Upright, Philip Aaberg
- 1989 Other Places, Brandon Fields

1990's

- 1990 The Language of Life, Everything but the Girl
- 1990 Tales from the Bulge, Michael Landau
- 1990 Blue Pacific, Michael Franks
- 1990 Beth Nielsen Chapman, Beth Nielsen Chapman
- 1990 Other Voices, Paul Young
- 1991 House of Hope, Toni Childs
- 1991 Free, Rick Astley
- 1991 Discipline, Desmond Child
- 1991 Swept, Julia Fordham
- 1991 Still, Tony Banks
- 1991 Worldwide, Everything but the Girl
- 1992 The Future, Leonard Cohen
- 1992 Life Is Messy, Rodney Crowell
- 1992 Fat City, Shawn Colvin
- 1992 The Hunter, Jennifer Warnes
- 1992 Me siento tan sola, Gloria Trevi
- 1993 My World, Ray Charles
- 1993 Rendezvous, Christopher Cross
- 1993 Duran Duran, Duran Duran
- 1994 Emperors of Soul, The Temptations
- 1994 Heart to Heart, Diane Schuur, B.B. King
- 1994 The Whiff of Bedlam, James Reyne
- 1995 Good News from the Next World, Simple Minds
- 1995 Soul Survivor, Bobby Caldwell
- 1995 The Promise, John McLaughlin
- 1995 I'll Lead You Home, Michael W. Smith
- 1995 Time Was, Curtis Stigers
- 1995 Time for Change, Wendy Moten
- 1995 If My Heart Had Wings, Melissa Manchester
- 1995 No Resemblance Whatsoever, Dan Fogelberg
- 1995 Out of My Hands, Jennifer Rush
- 1995 Thanks to Frank, Warren Cuccurullo
- 1995 HUMAN, Lee Seung-hwan
- 1996 It's Good, Eve, Vonda Shepard
- 1996 Lore, Clannad
- 1996 Dove c'è musica, Eros Ramazzotti
- 1996 Eat the Phikis, Elio e le Storie Tese
- 1997 Blue Moon Swamp, John Fogerty
- 1997 Angelica, Angelica
- 1997 Blue Tav, Steve Tavaglione
- 1998 Traeme La Noche, Gustavo Cerati, Andy Summers
- 1998 Spirit, Jewel
- 1998 Leave a Mark, John Michael Montgomery
- 1999 August Everywhere, Blinker the Star
- 1999 Amarte Es Un Placer, Luis Miguel
- 1999 Deja Vu, Frank Vignola
- 1999 The Whole SHeBANG, SheDaisy
- 1999 We Offer Praises, Ron Kenoly

2000's

- 2000 Celebrating the Music of Weather Report, Jason Miles
- 2000 Lara Fabian, Lara Fabian
- 2000 Fingerprints, Larry Carlton
- 2000 My Kind of Christmas, Christina Aguilera
- 2000 Paris Rain, Brenda Russell
- 2000 Isn't She Great, Burt Bacharach
- 2000 Live From Blue Note Tokyo, Chick Corea
- 2000 Two Against Nature, Steely Dan
- 2001 Aura, Asia
- 2001 Night Sessions, Chris Botti
- 2001 Christmas Memories, Barbra Streisand
- 2001 Trouble in Shangri-La, Stevie Nicks
- 2001 The Spirit Room, Michelle Branch
- 2001 Shared Secrets, George Cables
- 2001 The Well, Jennifer Warnes
- 2001 The Way I Am, Jennifer Knapp
- 2001 MTV Unplugged, Alejandro Sanz
- 2002 Santo Pecado, Ricardo Arjona
- 2002 Cry, Faith Hill
- 2002 Man with a Memory, Joe Nichols
- 2002 The Season for Romance, Lee Ann Womack
- 2002 Morning, Noon, & Night, Bob James
- 2002 Queen of the Damned: Music from the Motion Picture
- 2002 Twisted Angel, LeAnn Rimes
- 2003 1, 2, to the Bass, Stanley Clarke
- 2003 Big Fun, Bill Evans
- 2003 Bette Midler Sings the Rosemary Clooney Songbook, Bette Midler
- 2003 Clean Up, Ilse DeLange
- 2003 Now, Jessica Andrews
- 2003 Michael Bublé, Michael Bublé
- 2003 Before the Beginning, Aja Daashuur
- 2004 Earth + Sky, Andy Summers
- 2004 The Dana Owens Album, Queen Latifah
- 2004 Renee Olstead, Renee Olstead
- 2004 The Futurist, Robert Downey
- 2004 A Christmas Album, James Taylor
- 2004 That's Life, Julia Fordham
- 2004 Speak, Lindsay Lohan
- 2004 Heart & Soul, Joe Cocker
- 2004 Motown Two, Michael McDonald
- 2004 Second First Impression, Daniel Bedingfield
- 2004 The System Has Failed, Megadeth
- 2005 Number 1's , Destiny's Child
- 2005 Fireflies, Faith Hill
- 2005 Stronger Than Before, Olivia Newton-John
- 2005 It's Time, Michael Bublé
- 2005 A Little Soul in Your Heart, Lulu
- 2005 Rock Swings, Paul Anka
- 2005 This Woman, LeAnn Rimes
- 2005 American Made World Played, Les Paul
- 2006 Cool Yule, Bette Midler
- 2006 Rendezvous in Rio, Michael Franks
- 2006 Whatever We Wanna, LeAnn Rimes
- 2006 Givin' It Up, George Benson, Al Jarreau
- 2006 Back in Town, Matt Dusk
- 2006 Awake, Josh Groban
- 2006 Navidades, Luis Miguel
- 2006 James Taylor at Christmas, James Taylor
- 2007 Resurgence, Mark Isaacs
- 2007 Do svitanja, Vlado Georgiev
- 2007 Call Me Irresponsible, Michael Bublé
- 2007 Home at Last, Billy Ray Cyrus
- 2008 Jeff Beck: Performing This Week... Live at Ronnie Scott's, Jeff Beck
- 2008 Meet Glen Campbell, Glen Campbell
- 2008 Soul Speak, Michael McDonald
- 2009 Five Peace Band Live Chick Corea, and John McLaughlin, with Christian McBride and Kenny Garrett
- 2009 My One and Only Thrill, Melody Gardot
- 2009 Crazy Love, Michael Bublé
- 2009 Patrizio, Patrizio Buanne
- 2009 Tide, Luciana Souza

2010's

- 2010 Emotion & Commotion, Jeff Beck
- 2010 Singularity, Robby Krieger
- 2010 Strip Me, Natasha Bedingfield
- 2010 Peculiar Life, Richard Page
- 2010 Truth Be Told, Mark Egan
- 2011 Ghost on the Canvas, Glen Campbell
- 2011 Daydream, Katherine Jenkins
- 2011 Christmas, Michael Bublé
- 2011 Umbigobunker!?, Jay Vaquer
- 2012 5th House, Dominic Miller
- 2012 Kisses on the Bottom, Paul McCartney
- 2013 Unstoppable Momentum, Joe Satriani
- 2013 A Mary Christmas, Mary J. Blige
- 2013 Le Secret, Lara Fabian
- 2013 Daljina, Vlado Georgiev
- 2014 Map to the Treasure: Reimagining Laura Nyro, Billy Childs
- 2014 Holiday Wishes, Idina Menzel
- 2015 No Pier Pressure, Brian Wilson
- 2015 Today Is Christmas, LeAnn Rimes
- 2015 Shockwave Supernova, Joe Satriani
- 2015 Beauty Behind the Madness, The Weeknd
- 2015 Currency of Man, Melody Gardot
- 2015 Stages, Josh Groban
- 2016 The American Dream, Damian Drăghici
- 2016 Encore un soir, Céline Dion
- 2016 Remnants, LeAnn Rimes
- 2016 Encore: Movie Partners Sing Broadway, Barbra Streisand
- 2017 Moura, Ana Moura
- 2017 Alone, Toto
- 2017 Cosmopolitain, Kamil Rustam
- 2018 Old Is New, Toto
- 2018 Written in the Stars, MILI
- 2018 Traces, Steve Perry
- 2018 Another Time, Another Place, Jennifer Warnes
- 2018 Liberation, Christina Aguilera
- 2018 ARC Trio, Scott Kinsey, Jimmy Haslip, Gergő Borlai
- 2019 Far More, Lari Basilio
- 2019 Saab Guitar Project, Douglas Saab
- 2019 War in My Mind, Beth Hart

2020's

- 2020 Sunset in the Blue, Melody Gardot
- 2020 Music... The Air That I Breathe, Cliff Richard
- 2021 Liberation Time, John McLaughlin
- 2023 Rio, Trevor Rabin
