= Unusual Suspects =

Unusual Suspects may refer to:

- Unusual Suspects (Julia Fordham and Paul Reiser album), a 2010 album by Julia Fordham and Paul Reiser
- Unusual Suspects (Leslie West album), a 2011 album by Leslie West, a founding member of Mountain
- Unusual Suspects (TV series), American documentary television series
- "Unusual Suspects" (The X-Files), a 1997 television episode
- "Unusual Suspects" (Highlander: The Series), a 1997 television episode
- "Unusual Suspects" (CSI: NY), a 2010 television episode
- The Unusual Suspects (miniseries), a 2021 Australian miniseries
- The Unusual Suspects (novel), 2005 novel by Michael Buckley
- "The Unusual Suspects" (Dawson's Creek), a 2000 television episode
- "The Unusual Suspects" (Quack Pack), a 1996 television episode

== See also ==
- The Unusual Suspect
- Usual suspects (disambiguation)
