= Ode (poem) =

1873 poem by Arthur O'Shaughnessy

"Ode" is a poem written by the English poet Arthur O'Shaughnessy and first published in 1873. It is the first poem in O'Shaughnessy's collection Music and Moonlight (1874).

== Text ==
We are the music makers,
And we are the dreamers of dreams,
Wandering by lone sea-breakers,
And sitting by desolate streams; —
World-losers and world-forsakers,
On whom the pale moon gleams:
Yet we are the movers and shakers
Of the world for ever, it seems.

With wonderful deathless ditties
We build up the world's great cities,
And out of a fabulous story
We fashion an empire's glory:
One man with a dream, at pleasure,
Shall go forth and conquer a crown;
And three with a new song's measure
Can trample a kingdom down.

We, in the ages lying,
In the buried past of the earth,
Built Nineveh with our sighing,
And Babel itself in our mirth;
And o'erthrew them with prophesying
To the old of the new world's worth;
For each age is a dream that is dying,
Or one that is coming to birth.

A breath of our inspiration
Is the life of each generation;
A wondrous thing of our dreaming
Unearthly, impossible seeming —
The soldier, the king, and the peasant
Are working together in one,
Till our dream shall become their present,
And their work in the world be done.

They had no vision amazing
Of the goodly house they are raising;
They had no divine foreshowing
Of the land to which they are going:
But on one man's soul it hath broken,
A light that doth not depart;
And his look, or a word he hath spoken,
Wrought flame in another man's heart.

And therefore to-day is thrilling
With a past day's late fulfilling;
And the multitudes are enlisted
In the faith that their fathers resisted,
And, scorning the dream of to-morrow,
Are bringing to pass, as they may,
In the world, for its joy or its sorrow,
The dream that was scorned yesterday.

But we, with our dreaming and singing,
Ceaseless and sorrowless we!
The glory about us clinging
Of the glorious futures we see,
Our souls with high music ringing:
O men! it must ever be
That we dwell, in our dreaming and singing,
A little apart from ye.

For we are afar with the dawning
And the suns that are not yet high,
And out of the infinite morning
Intrepid you hear us cry —
How, spite of your human scorning,
Once more God's future draws nigh,
And already goes forth the warning
That ye of the past must die.

Great hail! we cry to the comers
From the dazzling unknown shore;
Bring us hither your sun and your summers;
And renew our world as of yore;
You shall teach us your song's new numbers,
And things that we dreamed not before:
Yea, in spite of a dreamer who slumbers,
And a singer who sings no more.

== Legacy ==
The phrase "movers and shakers" (now used to describe powerful and worldly individuals and groups) originates here. It gained traction as a signifier for worldly and powerful people when Mabel Dodge Luhan used it as the subtitle and epigraph of her 1936 memoir.

The poem has also been set to music, or alluded to, many times. Sir Edward Elgar set the ode to music in 1912 in his work The Music Makers, Op. 69, dedicated to Elgar's old friend Nicholas Kilburn, and the first performance took place in 1912 at the Birmingham Triennial Music Festival. Performances available include: The Music Makers, with Sir Adrian Boult conducting the London Philharmonic Orchestra in 1975 (reissued 1999), paired with Elgar's The Dream of Gerontius; and the 2006 album Sea Pictures, paired with The Music Makers, Simon Wright conducting the Bournemouth Symphony Orchestra. Zoltán Kodály (1882–1967) set "Ode" to music in his work Music Makers, dedicated to Merton College, Oxford, on the occasion of its 700th anniversary in 1964. The first three stanzas of the poem are featured on the song "We Are the Music Makers" by Antoni O'Breskey, and is recited by Ronnie Drew.

The first two lines of the poem were recited by Gene Wilder as Willy Wonka in the film Willy Wonka & the Chocolate Factory (1971). Aphex Twin sampled Wilder's speech on "We are the Music Makers" from Selected Ambient Works 85-92.
