= Gabin Dabiré =

- Born: Bobo-Dioulasso, Burkina Faso, Africa
- Occupations: Singer, musician
- Instruments: Guitar, Kora
- Years active: 1979–2023
- Website: www.gabindabire.org

Gabin Dabiré was a singer, guitarist, kora player, and composer from Burkina Faso (former Upper Volta) who has lived in Italy since 1975.

Born in Bobo-Dioulasso in the African state of Burkina Faso, Dabiré's first experiences in music were lessons from the great masters of the traditional music of Burkina Faso. In 1975 he traveled to Denmark on a scholarship, where he was exposed to European classical, experimental and contemporary music. In 1976 he toured in Italy and afterwards embarked on a study trip of chordophones and Indian percussion.

== Career ==
In 1979 his collection of ethnic music of Western Africa was published by the cultural association and music group Futuro Antico, which he co-founded with Walter Maioli and Riccardo Sinigaglia. The group used synthesized electronic tonalities matching the traditional musics from around the world. Their work was realised in the self-titled recording Futuro Antico in 1980. Also he formed the group ‘Yelbuna’ with some musician friends and performed in several Italian cities.

In order to consolidate the wide-ranging activities he was involved in, including music, cinema and theatre, he founded the Centro Diffusione Promozione Cultura (Culture Promotion Diffusion Centre) in Milan in 1983. This enabled him to present various aspects of African Culture. In 1986 he moved to Tuscany with his family where he organised concerts, and completed the recording of his first CD Kontome ("Spirits"), which was released the following year. In 1992 he started to expand his repertoire to include crossover music, resulting in a successful collaboration with the Gregorian choir ‘Santa Cecilia’.

In 1994 his second CD entitled Afriki Djamana was released by the label Amiata Records. The career of this composer and musician has caused him constantly to research new timbres and sonorities. He has kept his African origins despite using instruments of other continents and working with western musicians.

The group ‘Gabin Dabiré and Musicians’ is inspired by Dabiré's compositions, using harmonies that maintain the character of African music. The collaboration with the saxophone player Daniele Malvisi and the drummer and percussionist Paolo Corsi, who are both very open minded towards new musical horizons, has allowed Gabin Dabiré and his brother Paul Dabiré to explore sonorities and rhythms.

He played in a group with Giovanni Conversano (Guitar), Gianmarco Scaglia (Bass), Daniele Malvisi (Sax), Paolo Casu (Drums), Paul Dabiré (percussion instruments). In 2007 he released another Futuro Antico recording with Maioli and Sinigaglia, called Intonazioni Archetipe.

He has recorded music for "The Fermi Paradox" a group formed by David Rhodes (guitarist), Giovanni Amighetti, Roger Ludvisgen, Jeff Coffin and Wu Fei who have created compositions based on NASA-JPL concepts. In 2023 his last work "E-Wired Empathy" was released by Esagono Dischi distributed by The Orchard (company)

== Style ==
Gabin Dabiré's music incorporates diverse influences beyond traditional Burkinabe and West African forms. His acoustic guitar style reflects traditions associated prominent African musicians such as Jean Bosco Mwenda, S.E. Rogie and Ali Farka Toure. His compositions are characterized by multi-layering various instrumental sounds. His arrangements combine overlapping instrumental textures to create continuous melodic patterns.

== Performances ==
Gabin has played among others with Cecilia Chailly, Manu Katché, Walter Maioli, Dominic Miller, Pino Palladino, Giovanni Amighetti, Omar Hakim, Lokua Kanza, Jeff Coffin, Wu Fei, David Rhodes (guitarist), Antonio Breschi and Matteo Silva.

== Discography ==
- Kontômè (Spirits) (New Sound Planet, 1990)
- Afriki Djamana: Music from Burkina Faso (Amiata, 1994)
- Daby-Bâ with Bruno Genero Ensemble (QDS, 1996)
- African Angels (Amiata, 1997)
- World Music Atlas (Amharsi Srl/Amiata, 1997)
- Colors (Amiata, 1998)
- Africa X – Zokue Kpole (2000)
- Tieru (Intuition, 2002)
- The New Orleans Jig (EthnicPiano, 2004) with Antoni O'Breskey
- E-Wired Empathy (Esagonodischi, 2023) feat. Luca Nobis, Giovanni Amighetti, Jeff Coffin, Combass

With Futuro Antico

- Correnti Magnetiche (1980, tape - reissued on LP & CD in 2014)
- Ethnoelectronic Music (1983, split-tape with Esplorazione)
- Dai Primitivi All 'Elettronica' (1990, LP - recorded in 1980 - reissued on LP & CD in 2014)
- Intonazioni Archetipe (2007 - recorded in 2005)
- Isole del Suono (2016 - live in Italy 1980)
