= King Swamp (album) =

Studio album by King Swamp
- Released: 1989
- Recorded: 1988–1989
- Genre: Rock
- Length: 44:01
- Label: Virgin
- Producers: Dave Allen, Steve Halliwell

King Swamp chronology
King Swamp (1989)	Wiseblood (1990)

Singles from King Swamp
- 1. "Is This Love?" Released: 1989; 2. "Blown Away" Released: 1990

King Swamp is the debut album by the British rock band King Swamp, released in 1989. The track "Year Zero" was used during the pre-credit car chase sequence of the two-hour finale episode of Miami Vice, titled "Freefall" (first aired on 21 May 1989).

== Critical reception ==
Professional ratings
Review scores
Source	Rating
AllMusic	4/5 stars

The Toronto Star wrote that the album is "a revisionist kick, less interesting than either of the principals' previous efforts, but buoyed by the urgent growl of Walter Wray".

== Track listing ==
1. "Is This Love?" – 4:00
2. "Blown Away" – 4:11
3. "Man Behind the Gun" – 4:27
4. "Original Man" – 3:24
5. "Widders Dump" – 4:53
6. "Year Zero" – 3:54
7. "Mirror" – 4:57
8. "Motherlode" – 4:26
9. "Louisiana Bride" – 4:34
10. "The Sacrament" – 5:15
11. "Glow" – 5:42 (Bonus Track on UK CD)

== Chart performance ==
Chart (1989)	Peak position
Australian Albums (ARIA)	111
Billboard 200	159

== Personnel ==
- Walter Wray - lead vocals
- Steve Halliwell - additional vocals, keyboards
- Dominic Miller - guitar, dobro
- Dave Allen - bass guitar
- Martyn Barker - drums

Technical

- Bob Clearmountain - mixing
