= That's Life (Julia Fordham album) =

Studio album by Julia Fordham
- Released: 10 August 2004
- Studio: Market Street, Santa Monica, California and Paramount Recording Studio, Hollywood, California
- Length: 41:10
- Label: Vanguard
- Producer: Larry Klein

Julia Fordham chronology
Concrete Love (2002)	That's Life (2004)	That's Live (2005)

Professional ratings
Review scores
Source	Rating
AllMusic	4/5 stars

That's Life is the seventh studio album by English singer-songwriter Julia Fordham, released in 2004.

== Track listing ==
All tracks written by Julia Fordham, except where noted.

No.	Title	Writer(s)	Length
1.	"Sugar"		4:34
2.	"Jacob's Ladder"		4:26
3.	"Perfect Me"	Fordham; David Ricketts	3:55
4.	"Jump"		3:29
5.	"Downhill Sunday"		4:20
6.	"Walking on the Water"		3:59
7.	"Connecting"		3:53
8.	"That's Life"	Fordham; Gary Clark	4:30
9.	"I'm Sorry But......"		3:25
10.	"Guilty"		4:39

== Personnel ==
Adapted from AllMusic.

- Vinnie Colaiuta – drums
- Julia Fordham – vocals, background vocals
- Brian "Big Bass" Gardner – mastering
- Billy Goodrum – interlude arranger
- Helik Hadar – engineer, mixing
- Larry Klein – audio production, bass guitar, keyboards
- Greg Leisz – pedal steel guitar
- Jamie Muhoberac – Fender Rhodes, piano, Wurlitzer Piano
- Melanie Nissen – photography
- Dean Parks – guitar, baritone guitar
- Cindi Peters – production coordination
- Billy Preston – Hammond B-3 organ
- Chris Rakestraw – assistant
- David Ricketts – string arrangements
- Lee Thornburg – trombone (valve), trumpet
- Amy L. VonHolzhausen – design
- Joey Waronker – drums, percussion
- Albert Wing – tenor saxophone
- Jeff Young – Hammond B-3, vocals
- Jeff Scott Young – vocals, background vocals
