= King Swamp =

British rock band (1988–1990)

- Origin: London, England
- Genres: Rock
- Years active: 1988–1990
- Labels: Virgin
- Past members: Walter Wray; Dave Allen; Steve Halliwell; Dominic Miller; Martyn Barker; Mike Cozzi; Nick Lashley
- Website: www.kingswamp.com

King Swamp were a British rock band, consisting of Walter Wray (vocals), Dave Allen (bass), Steve Halliwell (keyboards), Dominic Miller (guitar), and Martyn Barker (drums). The band was formed in 1988 in London, after Allen and Barker had parted ways with Shriekback and recruited Wray as frontman. Halliwell and Mike Cozzi (featured on the second album) were also ex-Shriekback members.

King Swamp's self titled first album in 1989 had some success with the single, "Is This Love?" which reached number 21 on the Billboard Album Rock chart. The band released Wiseblood in 1990. Guitarist Dominic Miller was replaced by Nick Lashley and Mike Cozzi on the second album. Wiseblood failed to chart in the USA or the UK and was panned by critics, which ultimately led to the band dissolving.

Wray later produced a 1993 solo album entitled "Foxgloves and Steel Strings" with Miller, who later played with Sting. In 1996, the album was re-released in the US as "Steel Strings" using different artwork.

Wray and Halliwell reunited in 2010 to form Little Machine, who set poetry to music and who have performed with poet laureate Carol Ann Duffy. They are both part of The Saturday Girls, the backing group for Lily Rae (Wray's daughter).

Martyn Barker eventually reunited with Shreikback. Dave Allen started Low Pop Suicide and World Domination Recordings.

== Discography ==
=== Albums ===
List of albums, with selected chart positions
| Title | Album details | Peak chart positions | |
| Title | Album details | AUS | USA |
|---|---|---|---|
| King Swamp | Released: 1989; Format: CD, LP, CS; Label: Virgin | 111 | 59 |
| Wiseblood | Released: September 1990; Format: CD, LP, CS; Label: Virgin | – | – |

=== Charting singles ===
List of singles, with selected chart positions
| Title | Year | Chart positions |
| Title | Year | AUS |
|---|---|---|
| "Is This Love?" | 1989 | 109 |
| "One Step Over the Line" | 1989 | – |
| "Blown Away" | 1990 | – |
