= (Love Moves in) Mysterious Ways =

1992 single by Julia Fordham

Single by Julia Fordham

from the album Swept
- B-side: "Happy Ever After"; "Manhattan Skyline"; "One of the Boys"
- Released: 6 January 1992
- Recorded: 1991
- Genre: Pop
- Length: 4:34
- Label: Virgin
- Songwriters: Tom Snow; Dean Pitchford
- Producer: Peter Asher

Julia Fordham singles chronology
"I Thought It Was You" (1991)	"(Love Moves in) Mysterious Ways" (1992)	"Different Time Different Place" (1994)

"(Love Moves in) Mysterious Ways" is a song first recorded by British singer-songwriter Julia Fordham. Fordham was invited to record "Mysterious Ways" for the movie The Butcher's Wife, starring Demi Moore and Jeff Daniels, in late 1991. Fordham had then just released her third album Swept, at least in the UK and Japan, but the release of the album was quickly put on hold so that "Mysterious Ways" could be added to the track list. The rejigged album was released in the US in late October 1991, coinciding with the US release of the movie, and internationally. The album was also reissued in the UK, with "Mysterious Ways" - but not in Japan. There, "Mysterious Ways" was released as a 7-track EP. The EP includes the exclusive track "Melt", which Fordham had recorded for the Japanese movie The Flying Pennta in 1991.

The song became a popular pop standard in the Philippines when it was reintroduced by Filipino singer Nina in 2005.

== Background ==
"(Love Moves in) Mysterious Ways" was first offered to Linda Ronstadt, but she turned down the song. It was then introduced to Fordham.

== Performances ==
In 2014, Fordham performed "(Love Moves in) Mysterious Ways" live in her two Valentine concerts entitled "Love Moves..." in the Philippines.

== Track listings ==
- 7" single
1. "(Love Moves in) Mysterious Ways"
2. "Happy Ever After"
- CD single
1. "(Love Moves in) Mysterious Ways"
2. "Happy Ever After"
3. "Manhattan Skyline"
4. "One of the Boys"
- Japan CD EP
1. "(Love Moves in) Mysterious Ways"
2. "The Naked Truth"
3. "Manhattan Skyline"
4. "Loving You"
5. "One of the Boys"
6. "Melt"
7. "Happy Ever After"

== Charts ==
Chart (1992)	Peak position
UK Singles (OCC)	19
UK Airplay (Music Week)	20

== Nina version ==
"Love Moves in Mysterious Ways"
- Digital download cover

Single by Nina

from the album Nina Live!
- Released: February 2005
- Recorded: 30 January 2005
- Genre: Pop, acoustic
- Length: 4:27
- Label: Rhino, Warner
- Songwriters: Tom Snow, Dean Pitchford
- Producer: Neil Gregorio

Nina singles chronology
"The Christmas Song" (2004)	"Love Moves in Mysterious Ways" (2005)	"Through the Fire" (2005)

"Love Moves in Mysterious Ways" was covered by Filipino singer Nina, as the first single from her third album Nina Live!. It was released in February 2005 by Warner Music, along with the live album. The song was part of the Nina Live! recording session on 30 January 2005 at the PHI Resto and Bar, Metrowalk in Pasig. The song is considered to be one of the main reasons why Nina Live! became a success, which was certified diamond by the Philippine Association of the Record Industry.

Internationally, the song was released as a digital download through Rhino Records.

=== Music video ===
The music video for "Love Moves in Mysterious Ways" was recorded during the Nina Live! recording sessions, which was directed by Marla Ancheta. No studio version was recorded for release. The video features Nina performing live with the Essence band. Fans and audience surround her, while she sings the song to them.

The video premiered on myx in February 2005.

=== Release history ===
Date released	Country	Format
February 2005	Philippines	Radio airplay
2005	Worldwide	Digital download

== Other versions ==
- The song was covered by Taiwanese singer Winnie Hsin as "叛逃的愛麗絲" ("Pàntáo de àilì sī") on her Mandarin album 花時間 (Huā shíjiān) in 1992.
- The song was released by Michael English on his album Hope in 1993.
- The song was also covered by Filipino band MYMP for their 2005 album Versions.
- Christian Bautista also covered the song for Kris Aquino's album My Hearts Journey in 2011.
