= Wiseblood (King Swamp album) =

Studio album by King Swamp
- Released: 17 September 1990
- Recorded: 1990
- Genre: Rock music
- Length: 46:20 (U.S.); 47:03 (U.K.)
- Labels: Virgin; 2-91383 (U.S.); CDV2647 (U.K.)
- Producers: Dave Allen, Steve Halliwell

King Swamp chronology
King Swamp (1989)	Wiseblood (1990)

Singles from Wiseblood
- 1. "One Step Over the Line" Released: 1989

Professional ratings
Review scores
Source	Rating
Allmusic	2/5 stars

Wiseblood is the second studio album by the British rock band King Swamp. Originally released in September 1990, the album was panned by the critics. When the album failed to chart anywhere in the U.S. or the U.K., the band split up.

== Track listing ==
=== US release ===
1. "Wiseblood" – 4:13
2. "One Step Over the Line" – 4:38
3. "Floating World" – 4:14
4. "Walk the Knife" – 4:21
5. "Can’t Be Satisfied" – 5:07
6. "Nightfall Over Eden" – 5:43
7. "Walk on Gilded Splinters" – 4:45
8. "Some Kind of Love" – 4:35
9. "Kiss the Sun" – 4:44
10. "Wiseblood (Original Mix)" – 4:00

=== UK release ===
1. "Wiseblood" – 4:01
2. "One Step Over the Line" – 4:38
3. "Floating World" – 4:14
4. "Walk the Knife" – 4:21
5. "Can’t Be Satisfied" – 5:07
6. "Nightfall Over Eden" – 5:43
7. "Walk on Gilded Splinters" – 4:45
8. "Redemption Day" – 4:55
9. "Some Kind of Love" – 4:35
10. "Kiss the Sun" – 4:44

== Personnel ==
- Walter Wray - lead vocals
- Steve Halliwell - additional vocals, keyboards
- Dominic Miller - guitar, dobro
- Mike Cozzi, Nick Lashley - guitar
- Dave Allen - bass guitar
- Martyn Barker - drums

Technical

- Bob Clearmountain - mixing
