= Futuro Antico =

Futuro Antico may refer to:

- Futuro Antico (band)
- "Futuro antico" I & II, two songs from the 1989 album Visions by Andrea Centazzo
- Futuro antico I to VIII, a series of albums released by Angelo Branduardi between 1996 and 2014
