= Antonio Breschi =

Antoni O'Breskey
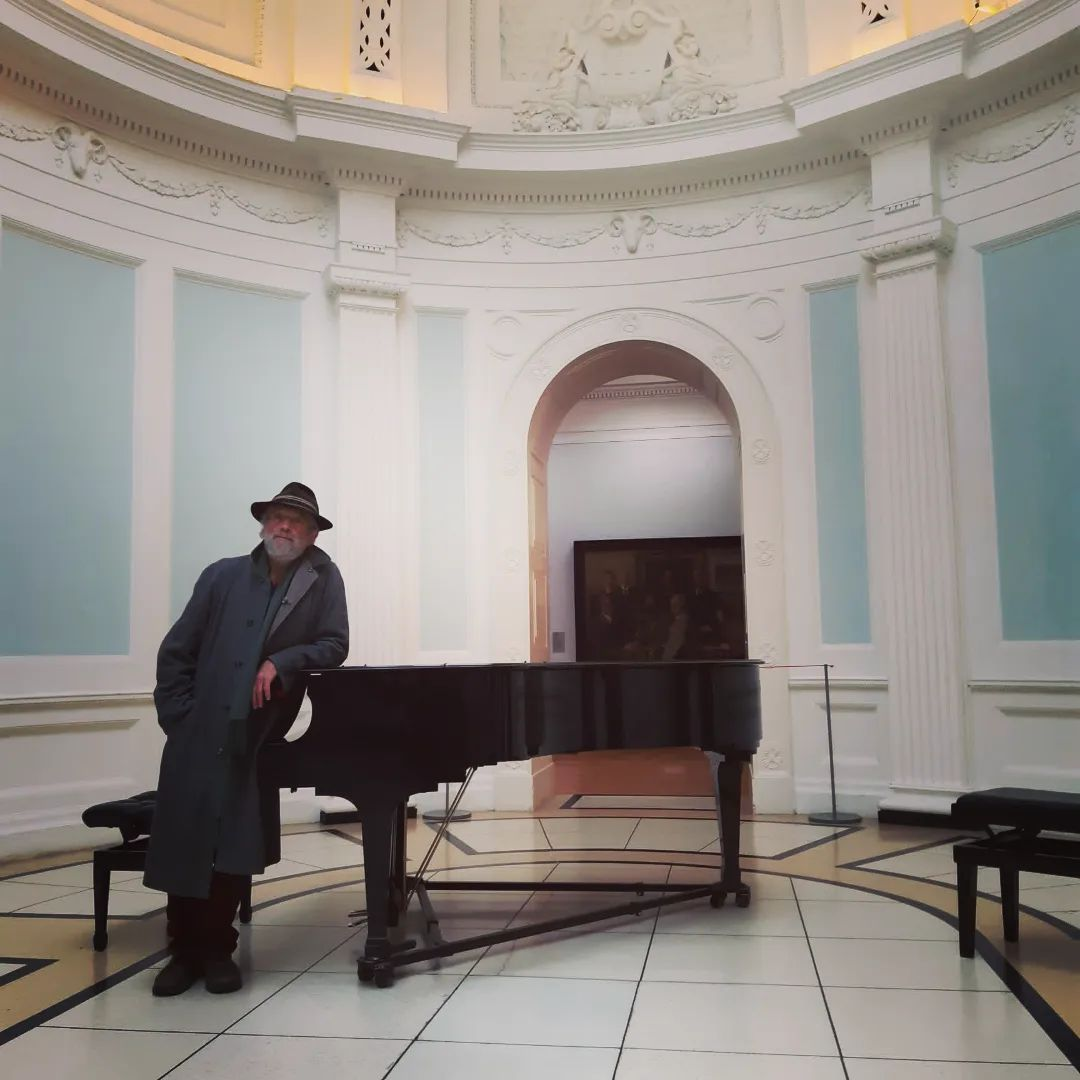
- O'Breskey at the Hugh Lane Gallery, 2022

Background information
- Also known as: Antoni O'Breskey
- Born: Antonio Breschi; Florence, Italy
- Genres: Irish, jazz, blues, flamenco, Celtic, folk, classical, new age, world music
- Occupations: Pianist, composer, singer, multi-instrumentalist, writer
- Instruments: Piano, vocals, trumpet, dulcimer
- Years active: 1976‒present
- Website: nomadicpianoproject.com

Antoni O'Breskey (born Antonio Breschi) is an Italian pianist, composer, singer and writer. He is known for his piano-driven cross-cultural compositions, blending ethnic traditions with jazz and classical influences. He introduced piano improvisation within Irish traditional music and flamenco, and he is regarded as one of the originators and leading figures of the world music and new-age genres. As a composer he has written over 300 works, spanning Celtic, flamenco, neoclassical and minimalist styles.

Trained in jazz and classical music from a young age, O'Breskey graduated in piano from the Luigi Cherubini Conservatory in Florence. Throughout a five-decade career, he has produced albums and shows that integrate Irish, Arabic, flamenco, jazz, Latin and Basque traditions, contributing to the innovation of Irish music and various contemporary genres. His compositions have been used as soundtracks for television, theatre and ballet, and they have also been employed in therapeutic settings. His strong connection to Ireland led him to adopt the name Antoni O'Breskey, and he performs as the leader of his ensemble Nomadic Piano Project.

O'Breskey pioneered cross-cultural fusions that were later associated with world music, and his early works are credited with anticipating Riverdance and providing a key structural influence for the show. He has released over 40 albums that feature prominent musicians from a wide range of global musical traditions, including Ronnie Drew (The Dubliners), José Seves (Inti-Illimani), Antonio Carmona (Ketama), Benito Lertxundi, Gabin Dabiré and Ali Tajbakhsh. In 2026, he celebrated his 50th anniversary as a musician and composer through the release of the three-volume compilation 50 Years of Music, and a screening of a new documentary about his musical career titled The Piano Nomad, directed by Luke McManus.

In addition to music, O'Breskey has written books, earned a degree in herbal medicine, and worked in music education and social work, including roles such as cook, actor, poet and humanist advocate.

== Background and collaborations ==
Antonio began playing jazz and classical piano at the age of 3. He graduated in piano at the conservatory Luigi Cherubini in Florence, where he also studied trumpet. He founded the Florence Jazz Society at the age of 16, and a few years later the International Folk Group, which became the group Whisky Trail. This name refers to the journey of the Irish emigrants to America and the meeting with the African people which, pursuant to Breschi's belief, gave birth to jazz. In fact among the many original titles of his albums were "Irish Meet The Blues" (his first solo album), "When Jazz Was An Irish Baby", "On The Irish Side Of Blues Street" and "Bound For America".

Between 1970 and 1973 he spent long periods in the USA in Alabama and Louisiana to explore the roots of blues, discovering the strong influence of Irish music in jazz, and performing with old jazz traditional musicians. These experiences are described in his tale “Alabama”. Still very young he appears in 1972 in Auburn, Alabama, playing with the "Auburn University Orchestra" and jazz trombonist Urbie Green. Then in 1980 he appeared in Rome with jazz violinist Stephane Grappelli for the first RAI (Italian National Television) Concert For United Europe. In 1985 he concluded the International Jazz Festival of Poland in Kalisz, together with South African pianist Abdullah Ibrahim (also known as Dollar Brand), and in the same year he performed for the National Spanish Television in the stadium of Alcalá de Henares accompanied at cajon by Antonio Carmona De Los Abichuelas, leader of group Ketama. Antonio Carmona also participated in his flamenco album "Punta Umbria" and "Al Kamar", a fusion between flamenco, Arabian and Irish music. The broadcasting "Fin De Siglos" announced him as "the new Keith Jarrett from the Mediterranean".

In Ireland he started a long collaboration and friendship with Ronnie Drew of The Dubliners, who participated in many of Antonio's albums, the most significant called "From Dublin to Bilbao". Then later he was on stage in Cesena, Italy, with Rumanian pan flute player Gheorghe Zamfir, in Istanbul with the gipsy Turkish clarinet player Selim Sesler, in Paris with African saxophone player Manu Dibango and rock blues French singer Jacques Higelin. He made many tours in Italy, Ireland and Switzerland with Irish musicians Máirtín O'Connor (De Dannan), Andy Irvine, Planxty, Dolores Keane (De Dannan), John Faulkner, Johnny McCarthy, Joe McHugh, Maurice Lennon (Stockton's Wing), Gerry and Annie O' Donnell, many of whom participated in Antonio's albums. In the Basque Country he started a strong relationship with national Basque singer Benito Lertxundi, who participated in his albums "Mezulari" and "Donostia", and Basque poet Josè Angel Irigaray, who created together with Antonio the album of poems and music called "Zeharbidetan". He also participated in his work "Orekan", which in Basque language means "harmoy among the people".

In 2008 he began a strong collaboration with José Seves, leader of group Inti Illimani, who sings in his album "Nomadic Aura". Among the many musicians that appear in his live performances and in his albums are Persian percussionist Alì Tajbakhsh, African singer Gabin Dabiré, Cathy Jordan (Dervish), Brid Ni Mhaoileoin, flamenco guitarists Juan Martin, Tomas De Los Reyes, Balen Lopez De Munain, Arabian violinist Jamal Ouassini (director of Tangery Orchestra), Biancastella Croce, Sergio Candotti, Elena Vicini, Mia Froelicher, Massimo Giuntini, Mario Serraglio, Vincenzo De Luci and many more.

Recently Antonio appeared in Ireland in duo with singer Donovan and special guest Chris De Burgh, and with Eoin Dillon (Kila). Currently he is playing in trio with his daughter Consuelo Nerea (singer, fiddle and bodhrán player) and celloist Davide Viterbo (who both participated with the music and production of most of Antonio's albums since 2001) and sometimes in quartet with oboist Enio Marfoli, who participated in the album "Boletus Edulis: Suite For Piano And Oboe".

== Film, theatre, ballet, music education and music therapy ==
Breschi composed the music for the 13 documentary film named Il Linguaggio Dei Luoghi (The Language of Places) by film director Folco Quilici, and for many other documentaries by the same film director (Le Alpi, Le Isole, etc.). He composed the music for the movie Le Colline del Garda by film director Franco Piavoli, for the Irish film The Nock by film director Dennis MacArdle.

He composed the music for Richard the Third by Shakespeare for actor Giorgio Albertazzi. He also created together with Zappalá Dance and Sicilian Ballet the work Mediterraneo, le antiche sponde del future (The Ancient Shores of the Future) which was performed all over Italy, Spain and North Africa.

He created four television serials named Il Suono E La Terra (The Sound and the Land) for the Italian television channel RAI 3 all based on his musical journey and his work with the children. Antonio created, performed and directed the fairytale "The Woman Of The Sea", also for children, produced by Teatro Comunale of Florence with the help of film directors Franco Piavoli, Ermanno Olmi and Mario Monicelli. This fairytale has been performed all over Italy and Switzerland. Later Antonio created a new version of it with Swiss theatre director Michel Poletti, produced by the International Locarno Puppets Festival.

In 1976 he created the music laboratory for children "Pistoia Ragazzi" in Pistoia, Italy and repeated the same experiences later in Zurich with emigrants and children, all this experience described in his book "Ecologia: Salviamo Anche La Musica". He also performed and still is performing concerts, shows for children and workshops all over the world.

His music has also been used for therapy. He personally did music laboratory for handicapped, homeless, drug addicts, immigrants and minority groups. The World Music Magazine of Barcelona wrote "his music is a caress that makes us feel human at least for a few moments".

== Selected discography ==
- Irish Meet the Blues (1980)
- Bound for America (1981)
- Far Off Hills… (1982)
- Ode to Ireland (1982)
- Linguaggio dei Luoghi (1984)
- Mezulari (1985)
- Tierras, Mares y Memorias (1986)
- Punta Umbría (1987)
- Al Kamar (1989)
- Orekan (1993)
- Toscana (1996)
- Songs of the North (1996)
- Song for Carla (1998)
- My Irish Portrait (1998)
- Irish Airs (2000)
- Donostia (2000)
- When Bach Was an Irishman (2002)
- The New Orleans Jig (with Gabin Dabiré) (2004)
- Zeharbidetan (with José Ángel Irigarai) (2004)
- From Dublin to Bilbao (with Ronnie Drew) (2008)
- Nomadic Aura (2009)
- When Jazz Was an Irish Baby (2009)
- Ready to Sail (2011)
- Dancing Waves (2014)
- Sorkuntzaren Trenean (2015)
- Samara (2020)
- Blessed Sadness (2021)

== Bibliography ==
- Ecologia: Salviamo Anche la Musica (1979)
- Semiminime (1996)
- Heyoka: Il Giullare dell'Anima (2006)
- When Bach Was an Irish Man and Mozart a Gipsy Boy (2015)
- Heyoka: Quando la Crema del Paradiso Traboccò in Irlanda (2017)
