= Dominic Miller =

British musician (b. 1960)

- Miller in 2025

Background information
- Born: Dominic James Miller; 21 March 1960 (age 66); Buenos Aires, Argentina
- Origin: Racine, Wisconsin
- Genres: Rock, pop, classical, jazz
- Occupations: Musician, composer
- Instrument: Guitar
- Years active: 1980–present
- Labels: Naim, Decca, ACT, Q-rious, ECM
- Website: www.dominicmiller.com
- Dominic Miller's voice Miller discusses the nylon-string guitar Recorded November 2025

Dominic James Miller (born 21 March 1960) is a guitarist. Miller has played alongside Julia Fordham, Eddi Reader and Sting. He has also released several solo albums.

== Career ==
Miller was born in Hurlingham, Argentina, to an Irish mother and an American father who worked for Johnson Wax. When he was ten, his family moved to Racine, Wisconsin, where the Johnson headquarters was located, and moved to London two years later. Returning to Racine, at fifteen, he performed publicly for the first time at a club in Racine as the only white person in a soul music band. He moved to London and studied at Guildhall School of Music, then returned to the U.S. and took a summer course at the Berklee College of Music in Boston. He also took lessons from Brazilian guitarist Sebastião Tapajós.

In the 1980s, Miller toured as a guitarist for World Party and King Swamp. As a session musician he recorded with the Pretenders, Phil Collins, Paul Young, and Level 42. Since 1990, he has recorded and toured with Sting. He co-wrote the hit song "Shape of My Heart" with Sting. He released his debut solo album, First Touch, in 1995, followed by Second Nature and Third World.

In 2003 he released the classical album Shapes, with interpretations of Bach, Beethoven, Edward Elgar, and Tomaso Albinoni.

His son Rufus (b. June 1985 in Hammersmith) is also a guitarist and performs with him. His daughter Misty Miller is a singer-song writer who has released the album The Whole Family Is Worried.

Currently, Miller lives in the south of France.

== Discography ==
- The Latin/Jazz Guitars of Dominic Miller and Dylan Fowler (Music Factory, 1984)
- Music by David Heath & Dominic Miller (Grapevine, 1985)
- First Touch (EarthBeat!, 1995)
- Second Nature (Rutis/BMG, 1999)
- New Dawn with Neil Stacey (Naim, 2002)
- Shapes (Decca, 2004)
- Third World (Alula, 2005)
- Fourth Wall (Q-Rious, 2006)
- In a Dream with Peter Kater (Point of Light, 2008)
- November (Q-Rious, 2010)
- 5th House (Q-Rious, 2012)
- Ad Hoc (Q-Rious, 2014)
- Hecho en Cuba with Manolito Simonet (Q-Rious, 2016)
- Silent Light (ECM, 2017)
- Absinthe (ECM, 2019)
- Vagabond (ECM, 2023)
- Diana (ECM, 2026)

=== As sideman or guest ===
With Chris Botti

- Night Sessions (2001)
- When I Fall in Love (2004)

With Julia Fordham

- Porcelain (1989)
- Swept (1991)
- Falling Forward (1994)

With Vlado Georgiev

- Do svitanja (2007)
- Daljina (2013)

With King Swamp

- King Swamp (1989)
- Wiseblood (1990)

With Level 42

- Staring at the Sun (1988)
- Guaranteed (1991)

With Mike Lindup

- Changes (1990)
- On the One (2011)
- Changes 2 (2023)

With Eddi Reader

- Mirmama (1992)
- Candyfloss and Medicine (1996)

With Soraya

- Torre De Marfil (1997)
- Cuerpo y Alma (2000)

With Sting

- The Soul Cages (1991)
- Ten Summoner's Tales (1993)
- Demolition Man (1993)
- Mercury Falling (1996)
- Brand New Day (1999)
- All This Time (2001)
- Sacred Love (2003)
- Songs from the Labyrinth (2006) - Guitar on two live songs on the Dowland Anniversary Edition of the album.
- If on a Winter's Night... (2009) - Guitar on 7 songs.
- Symphonicities (2010)
- Live in Berlin (2011)
- The Last Ship (2013)
- 57th & 9th (2016)
- 57th & 9th: Live From Chicago (2017) - Vinyl
- My Songs (2019)
- My Songs Live (2019, CD2 in My Songs Special Edition)
- The Bridge (2021)

With William Topley

- Black River (1997)
- Mixed Blessing (1998)
- Spanish Wells (1999))
- Sea Fever (2005)

With others

- Beth Nielsen Chapman, Sand and Water (1997)
- The Chieftains, The Long Black Veil (1995)
- Vinnie Colaiuta, Vinnie Colaiuta (1994)
- Phil Collins, ...But Seriously (1989)
- Beverley Craven, Mixed Emotions (1999)
- Gabin Dabiré Tieru (2002)
- Blossom Dearie, Blossom's Planet (2000)
- Manu Dibango, Wakafrika (1994)
- Lesley Garrett, The Singer (2003)
- Mark Hollis, Mark Hollis (1998)
- Manu Katché, It's About Time (1992)
- Ronan Keating, Ronan (2000)
- David Lanz, East of the Moon (2000)
- Marc Lavoine, Marc Lavoine (2001)
- Alejandro Lerner, Si Quieres Saber Quien Soy (2000)
- Chuck Loeb, Simple Things (1994)
- Kami Lyle, Blue Cinderella (1997)
- Mango, Come l'acqua (1996)
- Katie Melua, The House (2010)
- Wendy Moten, Life's What You Make It (1996)
- Youssou N'Dour, Joko (2000)
- Jimmy Nail, Crocodile Shoes II (1996)
- Novocento, Surrender (2009)
- Trijntje Oosterhuis, Trijntje Oosterhuis (2003)
- The Pretenders, Packed! (1990)
- A. R. Rahman, Vande Mataram (1997)
- Conner Reeves, Earthbound (2004)
- Kim Richey, Glimmer (1999)
- Eric Starr, She (2016)
- John Tesh, Guitar by the Fire (1998)
- Tina Turner, Wildest Dreams (1996)
- World Party, Bang! (1993)
- Richard Wright, Broken China (1996)
- Paul Young, Other Voices (1990)
