= Trilok Gurtu =

Indian percussionist and composer (born 1951)

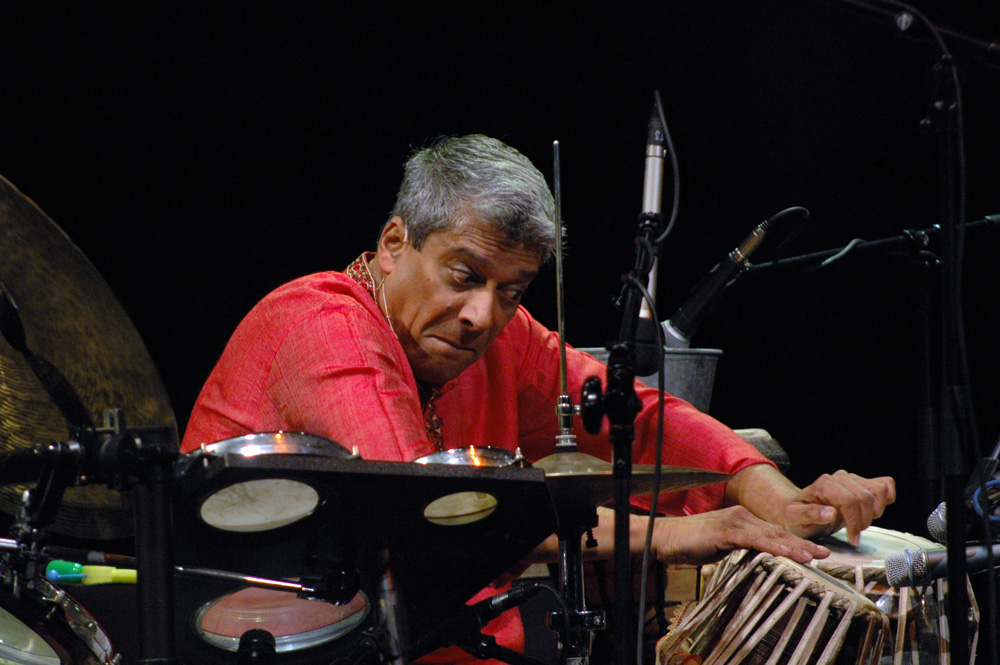
- Gurtu performing in Warsaw with Arkè String Quartet

Background information
- Born: 30 October 1951 (age 74); Mumbai, India
- Genres: Jazz fusion; world music
- Occupation: Musician
- Instruments: Drums, tabla, Konnakol
- Years active: 1970s–present
- Website: trilokgurtu.com

Trilok Gurtu (born 30 October 1951) is an Indian percussionist and composer whose work blends the music of India with jazz fusion and world music.

He has worked with Terje Rypdal, Gary Moore, John McLaughlin, Jan Garbarek, Joe Zawinul, Michel Bisceglia, Bill Laswell, Maria João & Mário Laginha, Stefano Bollani and Robert Miles.

== Early life ==
Gurtu was born to Hindu Brahmin parents in Mumbai, India; he had a Kashmiri Pandit father and a Marathi mother. He attended Antonio De Souza High School (ANZA) in Byculla,Mumbai. His mother Shobha Gurtu was a famous vocalist who encouraged him to learn tabla. He received formal training in percussion from Shah Abdul Karim.

== Career ==
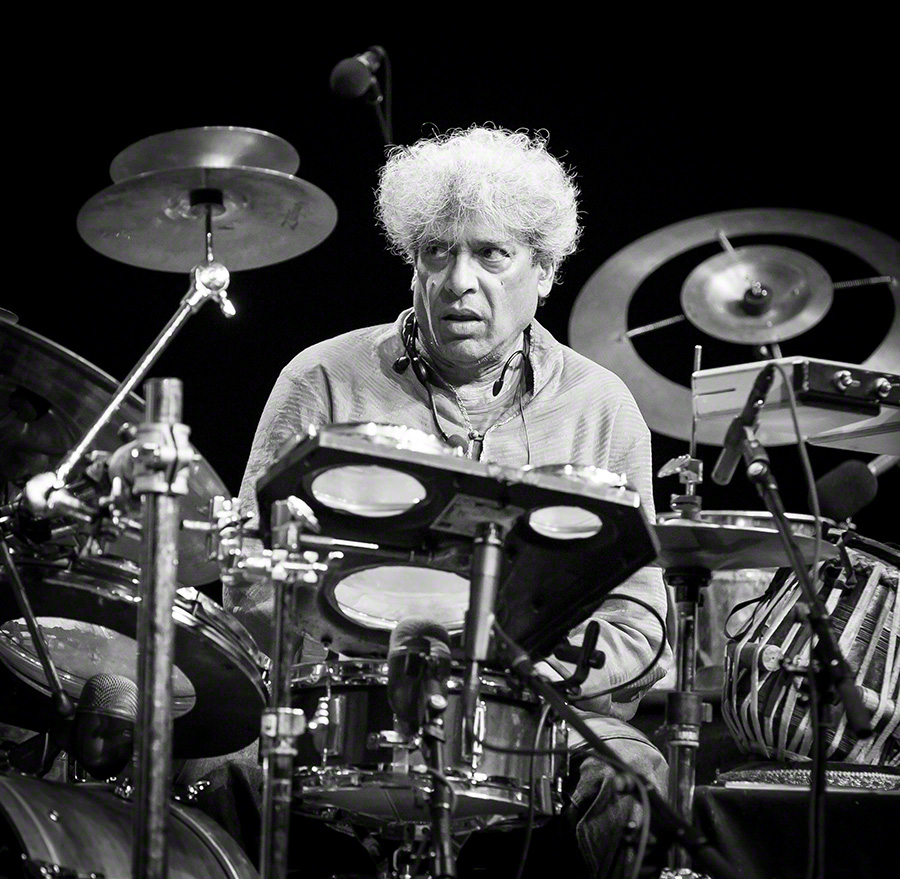
Gurtu at Oslo Jazzfestival in 2016.

Gurtu began playing a western drum kit in the 1970s, and developed an interest in jazz. In a 1995 television special on Jimi Hendrix, Gurtu mentioned having initially learned Western music without awareness of overdubbing, which, he said, forced him to learn multiple parts which most musicians would have never attempted. In the 1970s, he played with Charlie Mariano, John Tchicai, Terje Rypdal, and Don Cherry.

One of Gurtu's earliest recordings was on Apo-Calypso, a 1977 album by the German ethnic fusion band Embryo. His mother also sang in that record, and later joined him on his first solo CD, Usfret.

In the 1980s, Gurtu played with Swiss drummer Charly Antolini and with John McLaughlin in McLaughlin's trio, accompanied variously by bassists Jonas Hellborg, Jeff Berlin, Kai Eckhardt, and Dominique DiPiazza. The line-up with Hellborg performed at least one concert opening for Miles Davis in Berkeley, California in 1988.

Collaboration between Gurtu and McLaughlin included vocal improvisations using the Indian tala talk method of oral drumming notations for teaching drum patterns. Sometimes, Eckhardt would join in with hip-hop beat-box vocals for a three-way vocal percussion jam, while Gurtu and McLaughlin would throw in a few amusing words such as some Japanese brand names mixed with some Indian words.

Some of the unusual aspects of Gurtu's drum playing include playing without a drum stool, in a half-kneeling position on the floor, and the use of an unconventional kick drum that resembles a large drum head with a kick-pedal, and a mix of tablas and western drums. Gurtu's unique percussion signature involves dipping cymbals and strings of shells into a bucket of water to create a shimmering effect.

Gurtu joined Oregon after the death of percussionist/tabla player Collin Walcott. He played on three of their records: Ecotopia (1987), 45th Parallel (1989), and Always, Never and Forever (1991).

In the early 1990s, Gurtu resumed his career as a solo artist and a bandleader. Various noted musicians have backed him on a number of his CD releases.

In 1999, Zakir Hussain and Bill Laswell founded a musical group, Tabla Beat Science, which played a mixture of Hindustani music, Asian underground, ambient, Drum and Bass, and Electronica. Gurtu joined this group along with Karsh Kale and Talvin Singh. The group released three albums before going dormant in late 2003.

In 2004, Gurtu created an album, Miles Gurtu, with Robert Miles. His collaboration with the Arkè String Quartet began in 2007 with the release of the album Arkeology.

In 2010, Trilok Gurtu played on the album Piano Car, an opera of minimalist composer Stefano Ianne with Ricky Portera, Nick Beggs (Kajagoogoo), Mario Marzi, Terl Bryant (John Paul Jones/Led Zeppelin), John De Leo.

In 2012, Trilok Gurtu collaborated with electronic folk duo Hari & Sukhmani in their hometown of Chandigarh and produced a song 'Maati' on the music documentary-travelogue The Dewarists.

== Legacy ==
Trilok Gurtu is acknowledged as an innovative and ground breaking percussionist, and integrates swords, buckets and other non-conventional elements and into his sound. Zakir Hussain said that if Trilok Gurtu played only the tabla, he would have been the best tabla player in the world.

Deadmau5 (Joel Zimmerman) mentions Trilok Gurtu as his hero and once added: "You know who's a big hero of mine? Trilok Gurtu... Indians should know this. Indian traditional percussive algos (algorhythms) and modes blow my mind. Check him out. Full-on retarded isolation skills. I can't even chew gum and walk. There's a whole different language/notation to a tabla."

== Style ==
"An open-minded musician who embraces Jazz, Indian classical music, abstract improvisational and Asian pop, a dazzling percussion virtuoso, an accessible entertainer" – The Guardian UK.

He is self-confessedly strongly influenced by the rhythms of Africa and African beats and drumming patterns.

== Awards ==
Gurtu has garnered a number of prestigious awards and nominations, including:

- Best Overall Percussionist winner, DRUM! Magazine, 1999
- Best Overall Percussionist winner, Carlton Television Multicultural Music Awards, 2001
- Best Percussionist winner, Down Beat's Critics Poll for 1994, 1995, 1996, 1999, 2000, 2001, and 2002
- Best Asia/Pacific Artist nominee, BBC Radio 3 World for 2002, 2003, and 2004.

== Discography ==
=== As leader ===
- Usfret (CMP, 1988)
- Living Magic (CMP, 1991)
- Crazy Saints (CMP, 1993)
- Believe (CMP, 1994)
- The Glimpse (CMP, 1996)
- Bad Habits Die Hard (CMP, 1996)
- African Fantasy (ESC, 1999)
- Kathak (Escapade, 1998)
- The Beat of Love (Blue Thumb, 2001)
- Broken Rhythms (Worldmusicnet, 2004)
- Farakala (Frikyiwa, 2005)
- Arkeology with Arke String Quartet (Promo Music, 2006)
- Massical (BHM, 2009)
- 21 Spices (Art of Groove, 2011)
- Broken Rhythms (Cream, 2012)
- Spellbound (Moosicus, 2013)
- Drums On Fire with Chad Wackerman (Times Music, 2015)
- Crazy Saints Live (Art of Groove, 2015)
- God Is a Drummer (Jazzline, 2019)
- One Thought Away (Jazzline, 2023)
- Mirror (Worldwide, 2025)

With Family of Percussion

- Message to the Enemies of Time (Nagara, 1978)
- Sunday Palaver (Nagara, 1980)
- Here Comes the Family (Nagara, 1981)

=== As sideman ===
With Aktuala

- La Terra (Bla Bla, 1974)
- Tappeto Volante (Bla Bla, 1976)

With Charly Antolini

- Finale (Jeton, 1983)
- Menue/Finale (Jeton, 1987)

With Karl Berger

- Live at the Donaueschingen Music Festival (MPS, 1980)
- New Moon (Palcoscenico, 1980)

With Peter Giger

- Illegitimate Music (Nagara, 1978)
- Where the Hammer Hangs (Nagara, 1978)
- For Drummers Only: Live at Cologne (Nagara, 1982)

With John McLaughlin

- Live at the Royal Festival Hall (JMT, 1990)
- Que Alegria (Verve, 1992)
- The Promise (Verve, 1995)

With Robert Miles

- Organik (S:alt, 2001)
- Miles Gurtu (S:alt, 2004)

With Mark Nauseef

- Personal Note (CMP, 1981)
- Sura (CMP, 1983)

With Claude Nougaro

- Lady Liberty (WEA, 1987)
- Nougayork (WEA, 1987)

With Oregon

- Ecotopia (ECM, 1987)
- 45th Parallel (Portrait, 1989)
- Always, Never, and Forever (veraBra, 1991)

With Pharoah Sanders

- Save Our Children (Verve, 1998)
- With a Heartbeat (Evolver, 2003)

With Irmin Schmidt

- Filmmusik Vol. 3 & 4 (Spoon, 1983)
- Musk at Dusk (WEA, 1987)
- Filmmusik Vol. 5 (Virgin, 1989)
- Impossible Holidays + Musk at Dusk (Spoon, 1998)

With Fredy Studer

- Seven Songs (veraBra, 1991)
- Half a Lifetime (Unit, 1994)

With Swans

- Can't Find My Way Home (MCA, 1989)
- The Burning World (UNI, 1989)
- Forever Burned (Young God, 2003)

With Richard Teitelbaum

- Blends & the Digital Pianos (Lumina, 1984)
- Blends (New Albion, 2002)

With others

- Leonard Bernstein, Katia & Marielle Labeque, West Side Story (CBS, 1989)
- Michel Bisceglia & Didier François, Whispered Wishes (Prova, 2019)
- Ketil Bjørnstad, Grace (EmArcy, 2001)
- Jack Bruce, Somethin Else (CMP, 1993)
- Philip Catherine, End of August (Wea, 1982)
- Adriano Celentano, Facciamo Finta Che Sia Vero Clan (Universal, 2012)
- Aiyb Dieng, Rhythmagick (P-Vine, 1995)
- Doky Brothers, 2 (Blue Note, 1997)
- Christy Doran, Christy Doran's May 84 (Plainisphare, 1985)
- Embryo, Apo Calypso (April, 1977)
- Espoo Big Band, Neandertal Grooves (EBB, 2001)
- Peter Finger, Neue Wege (Stockfisch, 1984)
- Antonio Forcione, Ghetto Paradise (Naim, 1998)
- Ivano Fossati, Lindbergh Lettere Da Sopra La Pioggia (Epic, 1992)
- Jan Garbarek, Visible World (ECM, 1996)
- Dhruv Ghanekar, Voyage (Wah Wah Music, 2015)
- Roman Miroshnichenko & Henrik Andersen, New Shapes (Indie, 2021)
- Gilberto Gil, O Sol de Oslo (Blau, 2006)
- Danny Gottlieb, Whirlwind (Atlantic, 1989)
- Alfred Harth, This Earth! (ECM, 1984)
- Jonas Hellborg, Adfa (Day Eight, 1989)
- Maria Joao, Cor (Verve, 1998)
- Tony Lakatos, Tony Lakatos and His Friends (Krem, 1983)
- Bill Laswell, City of Light (Sub Rosa, 1997)
- Nguyen Le, Tales From Viet-Nam (ACT, 1996)
- Albert Mangelsdorff & Wolfgang Dauner, Moon at Noon (Musikant, 1987)
- Charlie Mariano, October (Contemp, 1977)
- Mario Marzi, East Travel (Stradivarius, 2011)
- Material, Hallucination Engine (Axiom, 1994)
- Paul McCandless, Heresay (Windham Hill, 1988)
- Airto Moreira, Misa Espiritual (Harmonia Mundi, 1983)
- Panzerballett, Breaking Brain (Gentle Art of Music, 2015)
- Michel Portal, Any Way (Label Bleu, 1993)
- Omara Portuondo, Gracias Montuno (World Village 2008)
- Barre Phillips, Three Day Moon (ECM, 1978)
- Dulce Pontes, O Primeiro Canto (Polydor, 1999)
- Joshua Redman, Chick Corea, Kenny Werner, Ludwigsburger Jazztage (Chaos, 1994)
- Marina Rei, Animebelle (Virgin, 1998)
- Claudio Rocchi, Il Miele Dei Pianeti Le Isole Le Api (Ariston, 1974)
- Terje Rypdal, Vitous & Gurtu, Trio Live in Concert (TDK, 2001)
- Lalo Schifrin, Esperanto (Aleph, 2000)
- L. Shankar, Song for Everyone (ECM, 1985)
- Tabla Beat Science, Tala Matrix (Axiom, 2000)
- Nana Vasconcelos, Rain Dance (Antilles, 1989)
- Pete York, Pete York Presents Super Drumming Vol. 3 (BMG, 1990)
- Joe Zawinul, My People (Jms, 1996)
