= Aktuala (album) =

Studio album by Aktuala
- Released: 1972
- Label: Bla Bla

Aktuala chronology
Aktuala (1972)	La Terra (1974)

Aktuala is the first studio album by Italian world music pioneers Aktuala and was released on Bla Bla records in 1972.

The inner sleeve of the record (depicted on Maoli's site below) features the large range of instruments used. Part of the point of the recording record was to make music that was "multicultural for the global village and escape the global 12-note even temperament monoculture" (nella pluricultura del villaggio globale, affinché non si arrivi ad una monocultura, standardizzata global, dettata da un'unica scala temperata di 12 note.)

== Musicians ==
- Walter Maioli: Arabian oboe, bamboo flute, bass flute, piccolo, metal flute in C, harmonica, reeds, whistles, djembe, percussion
- Daniele Cavallanti: soprano sax, tenor sax, clarinet
- Antonio Cerantola: 6-string acoustic guitar, 12-string acoustic guitar, balalaika, zither, dulcimer, viola, violin
- Lino “Capra” Vaccina: Moroccan bongos, koborò, African drums, tabla, gong, xylophone, whistles, cymbals, musical bow, marimba, percussion
- Laura Maioli: tambura, percussion, whistles

== Tracks ==
1. "When The Light Began"
2. "Mammoth R.C."
3. "Altamira"
4. "Sarah′ Ngwega"
5. "Alef′s Dance"
6. "Dejanira"
