= African Fantasy =

Studio album by Trilok Gurtu
- Released: 2000
- Length: 55:12
- Label: ESC; Blue Thumb
- Producer: Matt Howe, Trilok Gurtu

Trilok Gurtu chronology
Kathak (1998)	African Fantasy (2000)	The Beat of Love (2001)

African Fantasy is an album by the Indian musician Trilok Gurtu, released in 2000. The album was an attempt to meld Indian musical backing to African styles of vocalizing. Gurtu was also inspired, in part, to create a "danceable" album. Gurtu supported the album with a North American tour.

== Production ==
Oumou Sangare and Angelique Kidjo sang on the album, as did Zap Mama's Sabine Kabongo and Gurtu's mother. Gurtu wrote nine of the album's 11 songs.

== Critical reception ==
Professional ratings
Review scores
Source	Rating
AllMusic	3/5 stars
The Encyclopedia of Popular Music	4/5 stars
The Guardian	3/5 stars

The Washington City Paper called the album "a seamless but mostly not-too-slick meld of African and Indian traditional and pop styles, with a bit of jazz and a splash of circa-1978 Steve Reich." The Birmingham Post stated that "traditional instruments like the sitar, harmonium and tablas are blended with synthesizer and the bouncy bass of Kai Eckhardt de Camargo—ancient and modern as one."

The Guardian concluded that "the stronger tracks have a rhythmic propulsion and melodic flair reminiscent of the Zawinul Syndicate, while the worst sound like a bid for crossover radio-play appeal." The New York Times determined that the songs "easily juggle multiple systems of rhythm, melody, structure and timbre... Those systems don't melt down to find some innocuous common denominator; instead, various approaches move in and out of the music's foreground, overlapping when it's possible and taking turns when it's not."

AllMusic wrote that there are "striking juxtapositions, and there is some wonderful playing... But the concept of an Indian/African fusion remains a fantasy, at least in this execution of it."

== Track listing ==
No.	Title	Length
1.	"Rajasthan"
2.	"DJ Didgeridoo"
3.	"African Fantasy"
4.	"You Remember This"
5.	"Big Brother"
6.	"Folded Hands"
7.	"Old African"
8.	"Lisa"
9.	"Dinki Puriya"
10.	"Africa con India"
11.	"Big Brother Reprise"
