= Aktuala =

Italian band

Aktuala were a pioneering band from Italy, formed in 1972. The name comes from the Esperanto for "contemporary".

Their music has been categorised as world music, progressive rock, psychedelic, or avant garde, or "sounding like that of the English group Third Ear Band".

They formed in 1972 in Milan by husband and wife team Walter and Laura Maioli who were collectors and performers of ancient and ethnic instruments. For a while the group lived together in a musical commune, "picking olives and playing music". They played unconventional venues including asylums and wharfs.

They signed with the Bla Bla label and released their debut, self-titled album in 1973. Lino "Capra" Vaccina left soon after the release to pursue a solo career and eventually release his critically acclaimed solo album "Antico Adagio". The band then started a collaboration with Trilok Gurtu for their second album, La Terra, which was released in 1974. Following this, the band moved to Morocco to produce their third album, Tappeto Volante, in 1976.

Many of the band members went on to other music ventures. Maioli went on to the Futuro Antico project, Cavallanti to the band Muzik Circus, Gurtu to world music. Lino Capra Vaccina has played with La Scala Philarominic Orchestra and released another solo album in 1979 "L'attesa". Thanks to Dark Companion Records producer Max Marchini he returned to active solo career in 2015 releasing several solo albums for the label including the critically acclaimed "Sicnretico Modale" and "Metafische del suono".

== Members ==
- Walter Maioli: oboe, flute, harmonica, ethnic and self-designed and made "ancient" woodwind and percussion instruments, studio treatments 1973 - 1976
- Daniele Cavallanti: Saxes 1973 - 1976
- Antonio Cerantola: Guitar 1973 - 1976
- Laura Maioli: percussioni 1973
- Lino Vaccina: percussioni 1973 - 1974
- Otto Corrado: saxes, flute 1974
- Attilio Zanchi: guitar 1974
- Marjon Klok: harp 1974 - 1976
- Trilok Gurtu: percussion 1974 - 1976
- Kela Rangoni Macchiavelli: percussioni 1976
- Fabrizio Cassanoi: sitar 1976

== Discography ==
- Aktuala LP (Bla Bla, 1973)
- La Terra (The Earth) LP (Bla Bla, 1974)
- Tappeto Volante (Flying Carpet) LP (Bla Bla, 1976)
