= Usual suspects =

Usual suspects may refer to:

- "Round up the usual suspects", a famous line of dialogue from the 1942 film Casablanca
- The Usual Suspects, 1995 film
- "Usual Suspects", a 2009 single by Rick Ross from the album Deeper Than Rap
- The Usual Suspects (album), 2005 album by rock singer Joe Lynn Turner
- "The Usual Suspects" (Supernatural), an episode of the television series Supernatural
- Usual Suspects, a 2015 single by rap rock band Hollywood Undead
- Usual Suspects (album), a 1997 album by the 5th Ward Boyz
- Usual Suspects Gang, hip hop collective from London

== See also ==
- Unusual Suspects (disambiguation)
