= East West (Julia Fordham album) =

Studio album by Julia Fordham
- Released: 1997
- Studios: Ocean Way (Los Angeles); Hybrid (San Francisco)
- Genre: Pop
- Label: Virgin
- Producers: Michael Brook; Julia Fordham

Julia Fordham chronology
Falling Forward (1994)	East West (1997)	The Julia Fordham Collection (1998)

East West is the fifth album by the English musician Julia Fordham, released in 1997. It was Fordham's final studio album for Virgin Records.

== Production ==
The album was produced by Michael Brook. Members of Jackson Browne's band served as backing musicians. Judith Owen played piano on "More Than I Can Bear". James Fearnley played accordion on "I Can Tell You Anything".

== Critical reception ==
Professional ratings
Review scores
Source	Rating
AllMusic	4/5 stars
The Encyclopedia of Popular Music	3/5 stars
Houston Press	2.5/5 stars
Knoxville News Sentinel	3.5/5 stars
MusicHound Rock: The Essential Album Guide	3.5/5 stars

The Washington Post wrote that most of the musical settings "not only subtly highlight the sheer beauty of Fordham's voice, they quietly dramatize the emotional yearning and vulnerability that shapes the album's songs." The Knoxville News Sentinel declared that "Fordham's rich voice is a marvel... She conveys a cool British demeanor, but she is affecting and genuine."

The New York Times thought that, "amid all the talk about 'girl power' resounding in the media, some grown women continue to make lovely, complicated pop music about the ambiguities of maturity." The Dallas Morning News stated that Fordham's "smoldering soprano and confessional songs simmer in a soulful stew." The Houston Press concluded that, "with its tempo locked at a moderate swing and lots of innocuous strumming throughout, it quickly becomes stale."

AllMusic wrote that "Fordham possesses a gorgeous, dusky voice that is reminiscent of Joni Mitchell and Alison Moyet."

== Track listing ==
All tracks written by Julia Fordham, except where noted.

No.	Title	Writer(s)	Length
1.	"Killing Me Slowly"		5:31
2.	"East West"		4:04
3.	"Stay"		4:53
4.	"I Want to Call You Baby"		3:51
5.	"My Last Goodbye"		3:19
6.	"More Than I Can Bear"		3:48
7.	"I Can Tell You Anything"	Fordham; Simon Climie	3:36
8.	"Wishing You Well"		3:38
9.	"Magic"		2:56
10.	"Fat Lady"		4:55

== Personnel ==
Adapted from the album's liner notes.

Musicians

- Julia Fordham – lead vocals, background vocals, acoustic guitars, keyboards
- Michael Brook – Infinite Guitar, guitars, keyboards
- Lenny Castro – percussion, shaker
- David Clifton – electric guitars, acoustic guitars
- James Fearnley – accordion
- Mauricio Lewak – drums
- Jason Lewis – percussion
- Kevin McCormick – bass guitar
- Paul PJ Moore – keyboards
- Judith Owen – piano
- Martin Tillman – cello
- Jeff Young – piano, keyboards, Wurlitzer

Production

- Produced and arranged by Michael Brook and Julia Fordham
- Recorded and mixed by Jeff DeMorris, except tracks 2 and 3 recorded by Michael Brook, mixed by Michael Brook and Julia Fordham; track 5 recorded by Jeff DeMorris, Bill Jackson and Michael Brook, mixed by Bill Jackson, Michael Brook and Julia Fordham; track 6 recorded by Julie Last, mixed by Bill Jackson
- Programming by Michael Brook
- Recorded at Ocean Way, Los Angeles, except for tracks 2 and 3 recorded at Hybrid, San Francisco; track 5 recorded at Ocean Way, Los Angeles and Hybrid, San Francisco
- Mastered by Doug Sax at The Mastering Lab, Los Angeles
- Art direction by Robbie Cavolina and Julia Fordham
- Photography by Lisa Peardon
