= Julia Fordham =

English singer (born 1962)

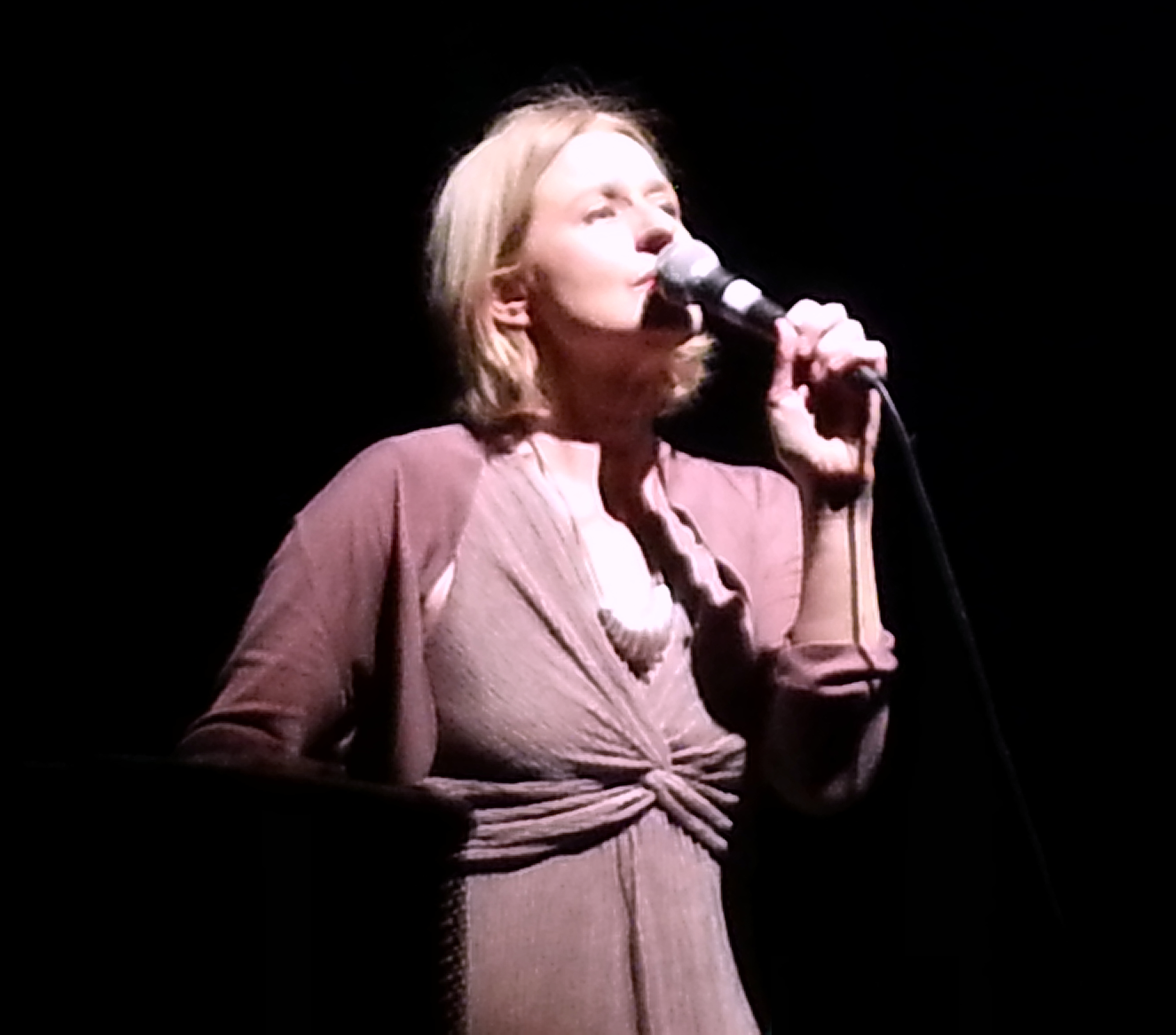
- Fordham performing live, 2013

Background information
- Born: 10 August 1962 (age 64)
- Origin: Hayling Island, England
- Genres: Pop; jazz
- Occupations: Singer; songwriter
- Years active: 1980s–present
- Labels: Circa Records; Virgin; Vanguard; Little Boo Records; Muttley Bosco Records; Cherry Red
- Website: juliafordham.com

Julia Fordham (born 10 August 1962) is an English singer. Her professional career started in the early 1980s, under the name "Jules Fordham", as a backing singer for Mari Wilson and Kim Wilde, before signing a recording contract of her own later that decade. She is now based in California.

== Career ==
=== 1980s ===
In 1988, Fordham released her first album on Circa Records, simply titled Julia Fordham. After a round of publicity including an appearance on the BBC1 Wogan chat show in April 1988, it reached No. 20 in the UK Albums Chart and eventually earned a gold disc. The album contains the top 40 single "Happy Ever After" (which peaked at No. 27 in August 1988). The album also charted in the US, reaching No. 118 on the Billboard 200 chart.

Fordham released her second album, Porcelain, in 1989. The album charted at No. 13 and was certified silver by the British Phonographic Industry. It was Fordham's only album to chart on the US top 100, reaching No. 74.

=== 1990s ===
In late 1991, Fordham released her third album, Swept. The album reached No. 33 in the UK and contained the top 40 hit "(Love Moves In) Mysterious Ways", which peaked at No. 19 in early 1992 and was also featured in the 1991 film The Butcher's Wife.

Fordham's fourth album, Falling Forward, was released in 1994. The album peaked at No. 21 in the UK. A single, "Different Time, Different Place", narrowly missed the UK top 40 (No. 41). In 1997, Fordham released her fifth album, East West. 1998's The Julia Fordham Collection recapped the best-known songs from these five albums and included new versions of recordings, including "Where Does The Time Go" which featured the vocals of Curtis Stigers.

Signed in 1999 to Division One/Atlantic Records, Fordham recorded Concrete Love. The album was produced by Larry Klein who has worked with many artists including Joni Mitchell (his former wife) and with Fordham previously on Falling Forward. The release was cancelled when a corporate reshuffle caused her record label to be closed and her contract ended. The album eventually emerged on Vanguard Records and various other labels internationally, including Sanctuary Records in the UK. It now featured a re-recording of its title track as a duet with India Arie, as well as different cover artwork. Remixes of the single "Wake Up with You" were also released. Fordham embarked on an acoustic club tour in the US, the UK and Japan.

=== 2000s ===
Fordham's seventh album, That's Life, was released on her 42nd birthday in 2004. She performed more live shows which included a successful run of shows in Japan at the Blue Note venues. That's Live, a live album and DVD (filmed in Los Angeles with guest appearances by the Grammy Award-winning singer-songwriter India Arie, the trumpeter Mark Isham and Judith Owen), was released in January 2005. Fordham then came to the end of her recording contract with Vanguard. Also in 2005, her sister, Claire Fordham, had a book published, Plus One: A Year in the Life of a Hollywood Nobody, based on her experiences of being Fordham's sister and living in Los Angeles.

Fordham continued to record, independently releasing a remake of her debut single "Happy Ever After" (with the help of a children's choir from a village near her hometown on the south coast of England) in aid of Indian Ocean Tsunami relief. This was backed by two tracks written and recorded with Aadesh Shrivastava. The single was then released to download and made available to purchase on CD. The proceeds from the sales of the record helped to rebuild a school in Cuddalore, India. The recording in West Sussex, UK brought Fordham back full circle to where she first started writing and performing songs in local folk clubs as a teenager.

In 2006, Fordham released an EP entitled Baby Love, via AWAL (Artists Without A Label). The EP is a collection of songs inspired by the birth of her daughter Marley Rose. Also in 2006, Fordham appeared in a music video for the Judith Owen track "Here", playing the part of Owen's mother. The video was directed by the actress Jamie Lee Curtis.

In 2007, Fordham appeared as guest vocalist on a track, "Carry", on Judith Owen's album Happy This Way. Fordham is friends with Owen and they have performed together and been a guest on stage at each other's shows.

In September 2007, EMI released the compilation album Songbook. It was a Philippines-only release and included previous studio recordings as well as live cuts and rare tracks. In November 2007, it was announced that Fordham had completed a new album which was going to be released via a "start up" company called NovaTunes. China Blue was released as a download-only album in late January 2008.

=== 2010s ===
In 2010, Fordham teamed up with comedian, actor and pianist Paul Reiser and released the album Unusual Suspects. The two embarked on an acoustic tour after its release.

In late 2011, Fordham released three new tracks for download, "You Left Me for Dead", "Red Silk Dress" (collaborations with guitarist Dominic Miller) and the seasonal track "Christmas in London".

Fordham's second album, 1989's Porcelain, and its 1991 follow-up, Swept, were both reissued by Cherry Red Records as two-CD deluxe editions in 2013. They were followed by deluxe versions of the first album, Julia Fordham, in 2016, and the fourth album Falling Forward in 2017. All re-releases contain B-sides, rarities and annotations written by her.

In mid-2013, Fordham was scheduled to do 15 concerts across the UK. The tour began in Worcester on 20 June and ended in her hometown of Portsmouth on 13 July. During the tour, Fordham was joined on stage by Judith Owen and they performed a duet written by Owen titled "That Scares Me" from Owen's album The Beautiful Damage Collection. Owen also performed one of her own songs and provided the on stage harmonies and backing vocals when Fordham sang her chart hit "Happy Ever After" (UK No. 27).

Skipping Under the Rainbow – Soundbite

"Skipping Under the Rainbow" was played by Michael Ball on his Sunday night radio show on BBC Radio 2 on 30 June 2013. On 4 July 2013, Ball joined Fordham on stage at Bush Hall in London and they performed a duet of Fordham's hit "Where Does the Time Go?" (UK No. 41).

Fordham was a guest on the Richard Madeley on Sunday show which aired on BBC Radio 2 on 7 July 2013. She performed two songs live for the show, including her single "Skipping Under the Rainbow", with Grant Mitchell accompanying on piano.

Shortly after finishing her UK tour, Fordham released an emotive tribute to Nelson Mandela in the form of a video set to Fordham's hit "Happy Ever After" (UK No. 27). This is the single that was inspired by Mandela's struggle through the apartheid years, his imprisonment and presidential years.

After spending the summer of 2014 in the studio recording tracks for a new album, she headed to the UK for a short tour, which opened in Cornwall at St Austell Arts Centre, taking in Bury St Edmunds, Glasgow, Selby and Stockton-on-Tees.

In November 2014, Fordham returned to the UK to celebrate the 25th anniversary of her album Porcelain. She performed the album in its entirety, accompanied by her long-time pianist and album producer Grant Mitchell. The Porcelain 25 tour included shows at Cadogan Hall, London, The Sage in Gateshead, and the Epstein Theatre Liverpool, before closing at the Tivoli Theatre in Wimborne. Shows in Los Angeles, San Francisco, New York and Tokyo and Osaka in Japan followed.

A tour with fellow singers Judie Tzuke and Beverley Craven, called Woman to Woman, begun in 2018, was continued into 2019, after a delay due to Craven's treatments for breast cancer. An album of the same name was also released to coincide with the tour, reaching No. 42 in the UK Albums Chart.

In 2019 Fordham released a new album titled Magic, written for and dedicated to her daughter Marley.

=== 2020s ===
On the 25th October 2024, Julia released her new studio album "Earth Mate".

== Discography ==
=== Albums ===
Year	Album	Chart positions		Certifications
Year	Album	US	UK	Certifications
1988	Julia Fordham	118	20	BPI: Gold
1989	Porcelain	74	13	BPI: Silver
1991	Swept	—	33	
1994	Falling Forward	—	21	
1997	East West	—	—	
1998	The Julia Fordham Collection	—	—	
2002	Concrete Love	—	—	
2004	That's Life	—	—	
2005	That's Live	—	—	
2008	China Blue	—	—	
2010	Unusual Suspects (with Paul Reiser)	—	—	
2013	Under the Rainbow	—	—	
2014	The Language of Love	—	—	
2016	Mixed, Shaken & Stirred	—	—	
2016	Live & Untouched	—	—	
2018	Woman to Woman (with Beverley Craven and Judie Tzuke)	—	42	
2019	Magic	—	—	
2020	Cutting Room Floor	—	—	
2024	Earth Mate	—	—	
"—" denotes releases that did not chart.

=== Singles ===
Year	Title	Peak chart positions		
Year	Title	US Adult	US Dance	UK
1983	"Friends" / "Friendship"	—	—	—
1988	"The Comfort of Strangers"	40	—	89
1988	"Happy Ever After"	24	—	27
1988	"Woman of the 80s"	—	—	83
1989	"Where Does the Time Go?"	—	—	41
1989	"Lock and Key"	—	—	80
1989	"Genius / Porcelain"	—	—	—
1990	"Girlfriend / Manhattan Skyline"	—	—	—
1990	"Manhattan Skyline"	40	—	—
1991	"I Thought It Was You"	—	—	64
1992	"(Love Moves in) Mysterious Ways"	—	—	19
1992	"I Thought It Was You" (re-issue)	—	—	45
1994	"Different Time Different Place"	—	—	41
1994	"I Can't Help Myself"	—	—	62
1995	"Hope Prayer and Time"	—	—	97
2002	"Wake Up with You"	—	10	—
2002	"It's Another You Day"	—	—	—
2004	"Kid Gloves"	—	—	—
2005	"Happy Ever After" (re-recording)	—	—	—
2010	"Unsung Hero" (with Paul Reiser)	—	—	—
2010	"Have Yourself a Merry Little Christmas"	—	—	—
2011	"Red Silk Dress"	—	—	—
2011	"You Left Me for Dead"	—	—	—
2011	"Christmas in London"	—	—	—
2015	"Got Your Back" (from the film Status Unknown)	—	—	—
"—" denotes releases that did not chart.

=== DVDs ===
- Julia Fordham: That's Live (Vanguard Records, 2005)
