= Ketama =

Ketama may refer to:

- Ketama (Moroccan commune), a rural commune in Al Hoceima Province, Morocco
- Ketama (Moroccan tribe), a tribe living in the Moroccan Rif, belonging to Senhaja Srair tribal confederation
- Ketama (band), a Spanish musical group in the new flamenco tradition
