= Fondazione Ras =

Italian archaeological organisation

The Restoring Ancient Stabiae Foundation (The RAS Foundation) is a non-profit Italian cultural organisation.

It was founded in 2002 through a partnership with the University of Maryland. The project aims to build an Archaeological Park of almost sixty hectares on the site of ancient Stabiae. The total costs have been estimated at $190 million.
