= Mario Marzi =

Mario Marzi (born 29 July 1964) is an italian saxophonist. He was born in San Giovanni in Marignano, Italy. His image appeared on the covers of Audiophile (Italy) and The Sax (Japan).

== Discography ==
- 2011 East Travel Antonio Carlos Jobim
- 2010 10 Anni Dopo Franco Donatoni
- 2010 Piano Car Stefano Ianne
- 2009 Piazzolla Four Seasons of Buenos Aires Piazzolla, Troilo, Iturralde, Gershwin
- 2009 The Art of Saxophone Glazunov, Debussy, Ibert, Milhaud, Villa-Lobos
- 2008 Milonga Del Angel Nazaret, Gismonti, Zanchini, Pascoal, Corea
- 2005 La Voce Del Sax Amadeus (prima italiana assoluta)Glazunov, Debussy, Ibert, Milhaud, Villa-Lobos
- 2005 Nonostante Tutto Cocomazzi
- 2004 The Sound of the Italian Saxophone Quartet Live concert in Verona Scarlatti/Pierné, Bach, Francaix, Iturralde, Piazzolla, Troilo, Joplin, Gershwin, Nagle, Rota, Nyman
- 2003 Saxophone Colours Italian & French music for saxophone and piano Sollima, Salvatore, Dulbecco, Galante, Del Corno, Andreoni, Ferrero, Boccadoro, Ibert, Jolivet, Milhaud, Debussy, Francaix, Schmitt, Desenclos
- 2003 Ensemble Strumentale Scaligero Gershwin, Corea, Iturralde, Piazzolla
- 2003 L'Arte del Funambolo Sollima, Salvatore, Dulbecco, Galante, Del Corno, Andreoni, Ferrero, Boccadoro
- 2003 Rapsodie Francaise Ibert, Jolivet, Milhaud, Debussy, Francaix, Schmitt, Desenclos
- 2003 Tango y ALso Mas Nazaret, Gismonti, Zanchini, Pascoal, Corea
- 2003 Georg Gershwin Gershwin
- 2000 Histoire Tango Piazzolla
- 2000 Dedicated to Astor Piazzola Piazzolla
- 1999 Scaramouch Milhaud, Jolivet, Ibert, Debussy, Francaix, Schmitt, Desenclos
- 1999 Hello, Mr. Sax Monteverdi, Haendel, Vivaldi, Brahms, Alessandrini, Gershwin, Piazzolla, Corea
- 1998 Astor Piazzola Piazzolla, Gismonti
- 1998 Ensemble Italiano di Sassofoni Billi, De Rossi Re, Masini, Nicolao, Prosperi, Sallustio, Telli
- 1997 Suite for Friends Cocomazzi

== Publications ==
- Il Saxofono. Zecchini Editore, 2009
