= Swept (album) =

Studio album by Julia Fordham
- Released: 1991
- Labels: Circa; Virgin
- Producers: Peter Asher; Richard Bull; Julia Fordham; Dominic Miller; Grant Mitchell; Hugh Padgham

Julia Fordham chronology
Porcelain (1989)	Swept (1991)	Falling Forward (1994)

Alternative cover
- Cover for North American versions of the album

Professional ratings
Review scores
Source	Rating
AllMusic	3/5 stars

Swept is the third album by English singer-songwriter Julia Fordham, released in late 1991. It includes Fordham's biggest UK hit single, "(Love Moves in) Mysterious Ways".

== Background ==
"I Thought It Was You" was released as the first single from the album in August 1991, reaching number 64 in the UK Singles Chart. After the album's initial release in the UK and Japan, Fordham was invited to record "(Love Moves in) Mysterious Ways" for the film The Butcher's Wife. Swept was swiftly released internationally to include "Mysterious Ways," aligning with the US release of the film. While the movie flopped, "Mysterious Ways" became Fordham's biggest hit single in the UK, reaching number 19 in 1992. Subsequently, "I Thought It Was You" was re-released in a remixed version, which reached number 45 on the charts.

== Track listing ==
All tracks written by Julia Fordham, except where noted.

No.	Title	Writer(s)	Length
1.	"I Thought It Was You"		5:07
2.	"Patches of Happiness"		3:47
3.	"Swept"		4:55
4.	"Rainbow Heart"		4:53
5.	"Betrayed"		4:11
6.	"Talk Walk Drive"		4:48
7.	"Shame"		4:11
8.	"(Love Moves in) Mysterious Ways"	Dean Pitchford; Tom Snow	4:35
9.	"As She Whispers"		3:52
10.	"Scare Me"		5:57
11.	"Tied"	Fordham; Russell Brown; Irwin Levine	3:01

== Personnel ==
Adapted from AllMusic.

=== Musicians ===
- Julia Fordham – primary artist, vocals
- Andy Barron – drums
- Miles Bould – percussion
- Robbie Buchanan – keyboards
- Valerie Carter – background vocals
- Vinnie Colaiuta – drums
- Michael Fisher – percussion
- Angie Giles – vocals
- Isobel Griffiths – drums
- Graham Henderson – accordion
- Christopher Hooker – oboe
- Manu Katché – drums
- Larry Klein – bass
- Dave Lewis – saxophone
- Jeremy Lubbock – arranger
- John Lubbock – conductor
- Dónal Lunny – bodhrán, bouzouki
- Kate Markowitz – background vocals
- Martin McCarrick – cello
- Dominic Miller – arranger, guitar
- Grant Mitchell – arranger, keyboards
- Pino Palladino – bass
- Dean Parks – guitar
- Dashiell Rae – vocals
- David Rhodes – guitar
- Frank Ricotti – vibraphone
- David Sancious – keyboards
- Alan Thomson – bass
- Gavyn Wright – violin

=== Production ===
- Julia Fordham – producer
- Peter Asher – producer
- Richard Arnold – assistant engineer
- Richard Bull – producer, programming
- Giles Cowley – assistant engineer
- Graham Dickson – engineer, mixing
- Filippo Gabbrielli – assistant engineer
- Kate Garner – photography
- Matt Howe – assistant engineer
- Pete Lewis – assistant engineer
- Dominic Miller – producer
- Grant Mitchell – producer, programming
- Simon Osborne – engineer
- Hugh Padgham – engineer, mixing, producer
- Jeremy Wheatley – assistant engineer
- Frank Wolf – engineer, mixing

== Charts ==
Chart (1991)	Peak position
UK Albums Chart	33
