= Rosso Antico =

Italian herbal liquor

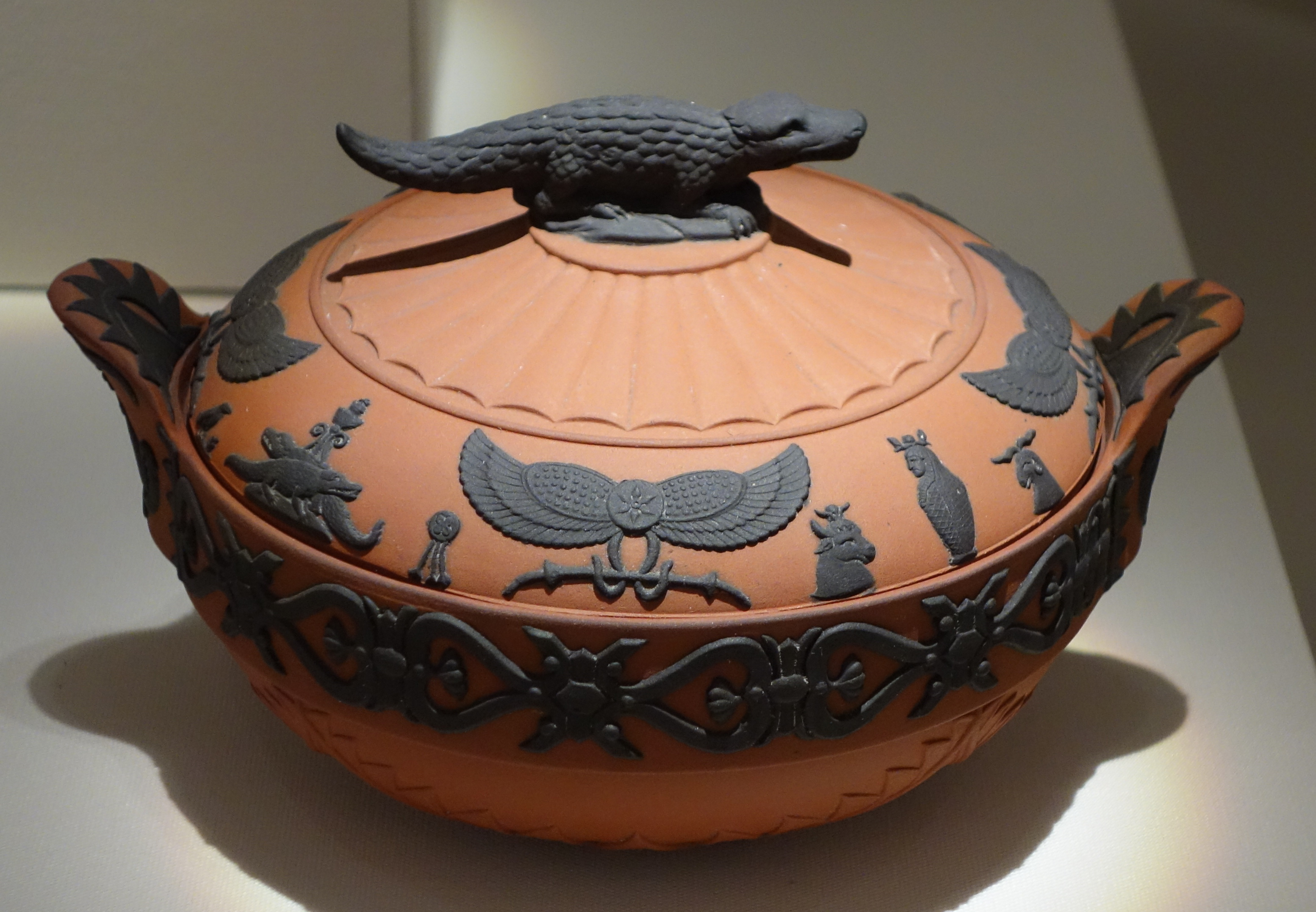
Covered Sugar Bowl, Wedgwood Factory, 1805–1815, Rosso Antico ware

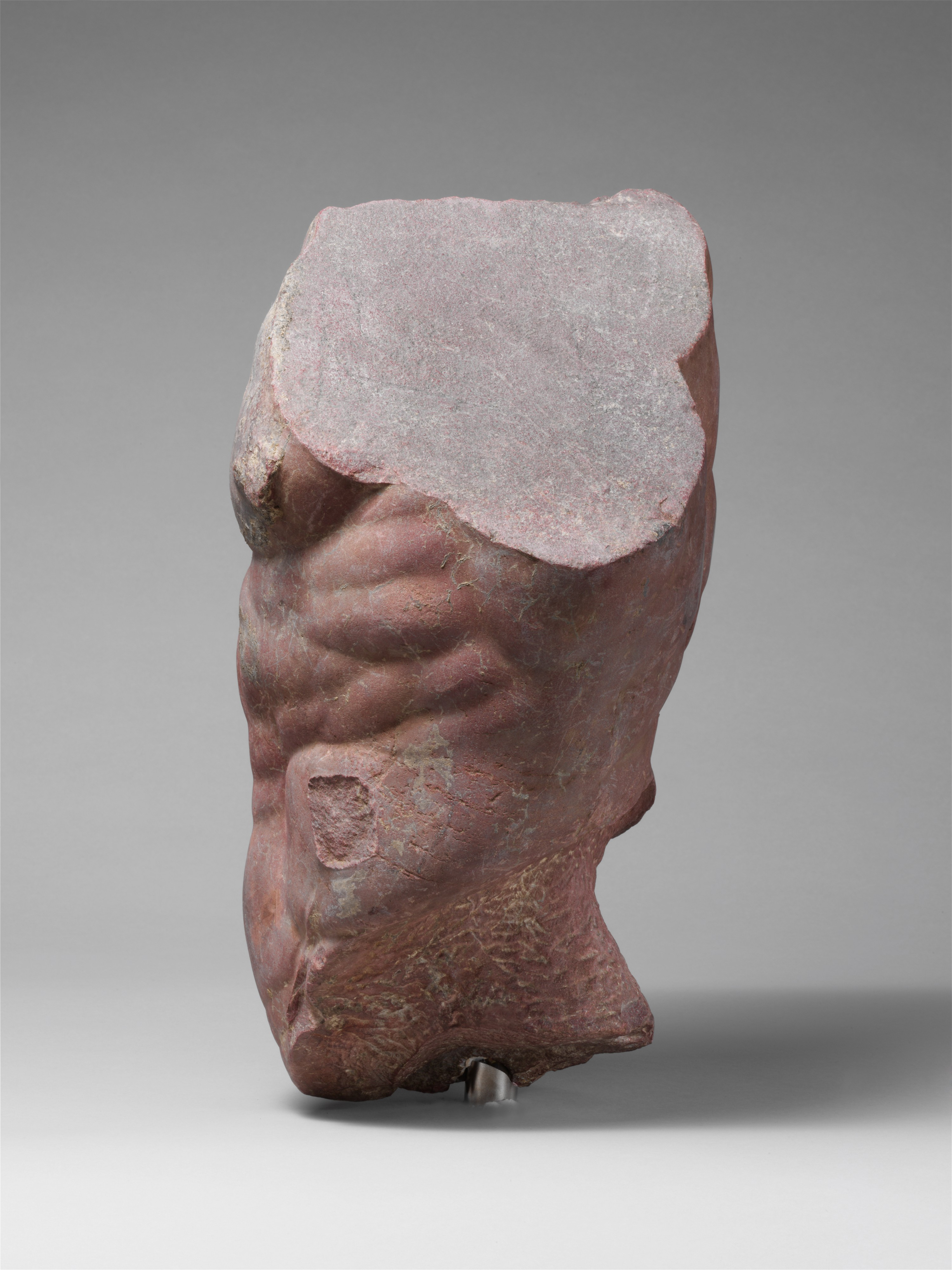
Rosso antico torso of a centaur, 1st/2nd century AD

Rosso Antico ("Ancient red") is an aperitif produced in San Lazzaro di Savena, Italy. It is produced by the infusion of 32 herbs macerated in alcohol (including rosemary, thyme and sage) and then added to a mixture of 5 different types of wine. The drink is ruby-coloured and has a sweet-sour flavor with notes of citrus and vanilla. Its alcohol content is 17% and is recommended for consumption as an aperitif, served plain with a slice of orange. It is sometimes used as an ingredient in a Negroni cocktail, as a substitute for Vermouth.

Rosso Antico is also a name for a type of marble, much used in the Roman Empire. The marble was valued for its similarity to the imperial colour of Tyrian purple and to the colour of wine, representing the god Dionysus. Since available blocks of rosso antico were relatively small, they were generally used for small architectural elements. It reached the height of its popularity in second century Roman towns, but also continued to see use in Christian and Islamic architecture.

It is also a red stoneware body developed by Josiah Wedgwood.
