= Happy Ever After (Julia Fordham song) =

Single by Julia Fordham

from the album Julia Fordham
- B-side: "My Lover's Keeper"
- Released: 1988
- Genre: Pop
- Label: Virgin
- Songwriter: Julia Fordham
- Producers: Julia Fordham; Bill Padley; Grant Mitchell

Julia Fordham singles chronology
"The Comfort of Strangers" (1988)	"Happy Ever After" (1988)	"Woman of the 80's" (1988)

Happy Ever After is a song by the English singer-songwriter Julia Fordham, included on her self-titled debut album. Released as a single in 1988, it reached #27 in the UK singles chart and number 1 in the Japan Singles Chart. "Happy Ever After" was inspired by Nelson Mandela's struggle through apartheid in South Africa and his imprisonment. The song was re-recorded for Fordham's 1998 compilation album, The Julia Fordham Collection, and given the subtitle "Rain Forest Mix '98".

Singer Jaki Graham recorded a cover version of "Happy Ever After" for her 1998 album My Life.
