= Porcelain (Julia Fordham album) =

Studio album by Julia Fordham
- Released: 1989
- Studio: MasterRock; Miraval; The Fallout Shelter; The Townhouse
- Label: Circa; Virgin
- Producer: Julia Fordham; Kevin Maloney; Grant Mitchell; Hugh Padgham

Julia Fordham chronology
Julia Fordham (1988)	Porcelain (1989)	Swept (1991)

Professional ratings
Review scores
Source	Rating
AllMusic	4/5 stars
Record Mirror	4.5/5 stars

Porcelain is the second studio album by the English singer-songwriter Julia Fordham, released in 1989. It became Fordham's highest-charting album in both the UK Albums Chart and US Billboard 200, peaking at numbers 13 and 74 respectively.

The track "Lock and Key" was released as lead single and reached number 80 in the UK Singles Chart. Follow up UK singles released were "Genius" (which was also released as an extended 12" single) and the double A-side "Girlfriend" / "Manhattan Skyline". "Manhattan Skyline" was released as a US single and reached #40 on the Adult Contemporary chart.

== Track listing ==
All tracks are written by Julia Fordham.

International LP
No.	Title	Length
1.	"Lock and Key"	4:36
2.	"Porcelain"	5:38
3.	"Girlfriend"	4:39
4.	"For You Only for You"	3:53
5.	"Genius"	6:19
6.	"Did I Happen to Mention?"	4:18
7.	"Towerblock"	3:51
8.	"Island"	4:41
9.	"Your Lovely Face"	4:30
10.	"Prince of Peace"	3:52

International cassette/CD
No.	Title	Length
10.	"China Blue"	3:16
11.	"Prince of Peace"	3:52

US LP/cassette/CD
No.	Title	Length
6.	"Manhattan Skyline"	4:51
7.	"Did I Happen to Mention?"	4:18
8.	"Towerblock"	3:51
9.	"Island"	4:41
10.	"Your Lovely Face"	4:30

2014 reissue / 2013 reissue CD1
No.	Title	Length
6.	"Manhattan Skyline"	4:51
7.	"Did I Happen to Mention?"	4:18
8.	"Towerblock"	3:51
9.	"Island"	4:41
10.	"Your Lovely Face"	4:30
11.	"China Blue"	3:16
12.	"Prince of Peace"	3:52

2013 reissue CD2
No.	Title	Length
1.	"Lock and Key" (radio edit)	4:22
2.	"Home"	3:53
3.	"Genius" (radio edit)	4:10
4.	"Porcelain" (radio edit)	4:07
5.	"Manhattan Skyline" (7″ version)	4:09
6.	"Island" (alternate version)	3:34
7.	"Genius" (extended version)	7:14
8.	"Manhattan Skyline" (edit)	3:35

== Personnel ==
Adapted from AllMusic.

- Arran Ahmun – drums
- Tom Baker – mastering
- Miles Bould – percussion
- Dave Cliff – guitar
- Graham Dickson – engineer
- Julia Fordham – arranger, guitar, primary artist, producer, vocal arrangement, background vocals
- David Green – double bass
- Manu Katché – drums, guest artist
- Kim Knott – photography
- Diane B.J. Koné – assistant engineer
- Ingmar Koné – assistant engineer
- Kevin Maloney – engineer, producer
- Dominic Miller – bass, drum programming, engineer, guitar, keyboards, programming
- Grant Mitchell – arranger, guitar, keyboards, piano, producer, string arrangements
- Hugh Padgham – engineer, mixing, producer
- Bill Padley – engineer
- Pino Palladino – bass, guest artist
- Kate St. John – oboe
- Alan Stone – assistant engineer, mixing assistant
- Alan Thomson – bass
- Cristina Viera – translation
- Helen Woodward – assistant engineer
- Taj Wyzgowski – guitar

== Charts and certifications ==
=== Weekly charts ===
Chart (1989–90)	Peak position
UK Albums Chart	13
US Billboard 200	74

=== Certifications ===
Region	Certification	Certified units/sales
United Kingdom (BPI)	Silver	60,000^{^}
^{^} Shipments figures based on certification alone.
