= Julia Fordham (album) =

Studio album by Julia Fordham
- Released: 1988
- Studio: Lillie Yard Studios
- Genre: Pop
- Label: Circa; Virgin
- Producer: Julia Fordham; Grant Mitchell; Bill Padley

Julia Fordham chronology
Julia Fordham (1988)	Porcelain (1989)

Singles from Julia Fordham
- 1. "The Comfort of Strangers" Released: 1988; 2. "Happy Ever After" Released: 1988; 3. "Woman of the 80's" Released: 1988; 4. "Where Does the Time Go?" Released: 1989

Professional ratings
Review scores
Source	Rating
AllMusic	3/5 stars

Julia Fordham is the debut album by the English singer-songwriter Julia Fordham, released in 1988. It includes the single "Happy Ever After", which reached number 27 in the UK Singles Chart, along with three further singles: "The Comfort of Strangers" (UK No. 89), "Woman of the 80's" (UK No. 83) and "Where Does the Time Go?" (UK No. 41).

== Track listing ==
All tracks written by Julia Fordham.

No.	Title	Length
1.	"Happy Ever After"	3:43
2.	"The Comfort of Strangers"	4:23
3.	"Few Too Many"	3:20
4.	"Invisible War"	2:49
5.	"My Lover's Keeper"	3:39
6.	"Cocooned"	3:39
7.	"Where Does the Time Go?"	4:27
8.	"Woman of the 80's"	5:16
9.	"The Other Woman"	4:14
10.	"Behind Closed Doors"	2:09
11.	"Unconditional Love"	3:35

== Personnel ==
Adapted from AllMusic.

- Afrodiziak – vocals
- Carlos Alomar – guitar
- Brian Aris – photography
- Howie B – assistant engineer
- Robin Clark – vocals
- Michael Cozzi – guitar
- Claudia Fontaine – vocals
- Antonio Forcione – guitar
- Julia Fordham – vocals
- Angie Giles – vocals
- Omar Hakim – drums
- Luís Jardim – percussion
- Bashiri Johnson – percussion
- Robbie Kondor - keyboards
- Noel Langley – flugelhorn, flute, trumpet
- Tony Levin – bass
- Bob Ludwig – mastering
- Joe Mardin – conductor
- Grant Mitchell – arranger, brass arrangement, keyboard programming, keyboards, producer, programming, string arrangements, vocals
- Peter Mountain – photography
- The New West Horns – ensemble, horn
- John O'Kane – bass, vocals
- Naomi Osbourne – vocals
- Hugh Padgham – engineer, mixing
- Bill Padley – engineer, producer, programming, vocals
- David Palmer – bass, cello, drums, stick
- Dave Sinclair – bass, cello, stick
- Ashley Slater – trombone
- Andy Snitzer – saxophone
- Caron Wheeler – vocals
- Taj Wyzgowski – guitar

== Charts and certifications ==
=== Weekly charts ===
Chart (1988–89)	Peak position
UK Albums Chart	20
US Billboard 200	118

=== Certifications ===
Region	Certification	Certified units/sales
United Kingdom (BPI)	Gold	100,000^{^}
^{^} Shipments figures based on certification alone.
