= Falling Forward (Julia Fordham album) =

Studio album by Julia Fordham
- Released: 1994
- Studio: Westlake, Los Angeles; Conway, Hollywood; Ocean Way, Hollywood; Studio Masters, Los Angeles; Olympic, London; The Kiva, Los Angeles; Rumbo, Los Angeles
- Label: Circa; Virgin
- Producer: Larry Klein; Julia Fordham

Julia Fordham chronology
Swept (1991)	Falling Forward (1994)	East West (1997)

Professional ratings
Review scores
Source	Rating
AllMusic	3/5 stars

Falling Forward is the fourth album by English singer-songwriter Julia Fordham, released in 1994. The album includes the singles "Different Time, Different Place" (UK No. 41), "I Can't Help Myself" (UK No. 62) and "Hope, Prayer & Time" (UK No. 97).

== Track listing ==
All tracks written by Julia Fordham, except where noted.

No.	Title	Writer(s)	Length
1.	"I Can't Help Myself"		4:01
2.	"Caged Bird"		4:07
3.	"Falling Forward"	Fordham; John Watkin	5:19
4.	"River"		4:28
5.	"Blue Sky"		6:15
6.	"Different Time, Different Place"	Fordham; Simon Climie	4:04
7.	"Threadbare"	Fordham; Climie	5:01
8.	"Love & Forgiveness"		4:17
9.	"Honeymoon"		3:31
10.	"Hope, Prayer & Time"	Gary Clark	3:54
11.	"Safe"		4:23

== Personnel ==
Adapted from the album's liner notes.

=== Musicians ===
- Julia Fordham – vocals, backing vocals
- Alex Acuña – percussion
- Stacy Campbell – backing vocals
- Bobby Carlos – lap steel guitar
- Gary Clark – backing vocals
- Russell Ferrante – keyboards, piano, organ, Hammond B-3 organ
- Isobel Griffiths – orchestral contractor
- Mark Isham – trumpet
- Barry Kinder – drums, percussion
- Larry Klein – bass, percussion, keyboards
- The LA Mass Choir – backing vocals (conducted by Donald Taylor)
- Michael Landau – guitar, electric guitar
- David Lasley – backing vocals
- Greg Leisz – pedal steel guitar, mandolin
- Iki Levy – percussion
- Martin Loveday – cello
- Jean McClain – backing vocals
- Arnold McCuller – backing vocals
- Ed Mann – vibraphone, marimba, bass marimba
- Dominic Miller – guitar, nylon string guitar
- Grant Mitchell – piano, string arrangement
- Perry Montague-Mason – violin
- Bill Payne – piano, Hammond B-3 organ
- Brenda Russell – backing vocals
- Vonda Shepard – backing vocals
- Steuart Smith – acoustic guitar, electric guitar, mandolin
- Philip Taylor – piano
- Jorge Trivisonno – bandoneon
- Carlos Vega – drums
- Gavyn Wright – first violin

=== Production ===
- Produced by Larry Klein and Julia Fordham
- Recorded by Dan Marnien, except track 9 by Andy Bradfield
- Mixed by Mike Shipley (tracks 1, 3–4, 6–7, 10–11) and Dan Marnien (tracks 2, 5, 8–9)
- All backing vocals arranged by Julia Fordham, except track 4 by Julia Fordham and Angie Giles
- Scored by David Campbell, except track 10 by Julia Fordham and Gary Clark, and track 6 by Julia Fordham and Simon Climie
- Assistant engineers: Charlie Essers, Mark Guilbeault, Brian Kinkel, Thomas Mahn, Chad Munsey, Marnie Riley, Chip Mullane, Mark Haley, Shawn Berman, Dick Kaneshiro
- Additional engineering: Rob Jaczko, Julie Last
- Production coordinator: Marsha Burns
- Design: Michael Nash Associates
- Photography: Kate Garner

== Charts ==
Chart (1994)	Peak position
UK Albums Chart	21
