= Unusual Suspects (Julia Fordham and Paul Reiser album) =

Studio album by Julia Fordham and Paul Reiser
- Released: 2010
- Studio: 88Keys Music, Silver Lake, California
- Label: Muttley Bosco
- Producer: Steven Argila

Julia Fordham chronology
China Blue (2008)	Unusual Suspects (2010)	Under the Rainbow (2013)

Unusual Suspects is an album by English singer-songwriter Julia Fordham and American comedian, actor, writer, and musician Paul Reiser. It was released in 2010. The album's ten songs are sung by Fordham, who also wrote the lyrics, while Reiser provides the piano playing and wrote the music.

== Background ==
Before the 'unusual' collaboration between the two came about, Reiser was asked in an interview who he listened to in the car; he replied "Julia Fordham", after hearing a song by the singer whilst driving and being captivated by her voice. This led to Fordham contacting Reiser to thank him. Years later, the two coincidentally met at a movie screening and Reiser had the idea of collaborating, as he had already started writing music, to which Fordham agreed.

The album's first single, "UnSung Hero", pays tribute to US troops serving overseas, and their families who offer support from home.

== Track listing ==
All tracks written by Julia Fordham (lyrics) and Paul Reiser (music).

1. "You Keep Me On My Feet"
2. "Fine"
3. "Shadow"
4. "UnSung Hero"
5. "Good Ship"
6. "Stolen Kiss"
7. "Walking Shoes"
8. "Say Hey Kid"
9. "Trusted"
10. "Minefield"

== Personnel ==
Adapted from the Unusual Suspects liner notes.

=== Musicians ===
- Julia Fordham – vocals
- Paul Reiser – piano, keyboards
- Steven Argila – keyboards
- Chris Bleth – woodwinds and duduk
- Ray Brinker – drums, percussion
- James Harrah – guitar
- Trey Henry – bass
- Mark Isham – trumpet
- Bart Samolis – bass
- Jason Smith – additional percussion
- Cameron Stone – cello
- Violet Finn, Marley Gazaryants, Noa Gross, Weston Krause, Jennifer Mendez, Erin Murray, Eireann O'Grady, Laura Rush, Kenner Valentin, Gabriella Watkin – children's choir

=== Production ===
- Produced by Steven Argila
- Mixed and engineered by Stephen Krause
- Mastered by Dave Collins
- Arrangements by Paul Reiser and Steven Argila
- Photography – Simon Gluckman
- Art and design – Joan Scheibel
