= Futuro Antico (band) =

Italian world music band

Futuro Antico (Ancient Future) is a world music group comprising Walter Maioli (after the demise of the group Aktuala) with Riccardo Sinigaglia (a keyboardist and theoretician in musical intonations) and Gabin Dabiré (a singer, guitar player, and composer from Burkina Faso). The aim of the project is D'ai primitivi all'elettronica, and they recruited a number of musicians from India and Africa for the recording. The project is considered by the participants to be open-ended.

The second album, Dai primitivi all'elettronica (From primitive to electronic), was released in 1980. It features a mixture of synthesized and ethnic music, highlighting the role intonation plays in music. This theme was featured in Tappo Volante, the last Aktuala album, which featured the mixture of ethnic sounds and studio processing. The track "Echo Raga" is featured on that recording as well. They recruited a number of musicians from India and Africa for the recording. There was an initial pressing of 350 tapes made, due to lack of major label interests. After a number of bootlegs surfaced, an LP run of 1000 was pressed.

== Discography ==
- Futuro Antico (1980)
- Dai primitivi all'elettronica (1980)
- Intonazioni Archetipe (2005)
