= La Terra (album) =

1974 album by Aktuala

Studio album by Aktuala
- Released: 1974
- Label: Bla Bla Records

Aktuala chronology
Aktuala (1972)	La Terra (1974)	Tappeto Volante (Flying Carpet) (1976)

La Terra ("The Earth") is the second studio album by Italian world music pioneers Aktuala. It was released on Bla Bla records in 1974. The cover features a medieval map of the world as it was known surrounded by the "world ocean". There are fewer, longer pieces than on the first record and they feature extended jams. Maioli writes that it was representative of the music played by the core group of Maioli, Cavallanti and Cerantola for two years; rehearsing and jamming in restaurants and psych wards until they got the perfect sound, and that it features the influences but not the performances of many of the other musicians who performed with them over that time. It is the first recording of master world percussionist Trilok Gurtu, who had to leave Italy shortly after the recording because of work visa expiry.

== Track listing ==
1. "Mina"
2. "Mud"
3. "Sar"
4. "La terra"

== Musicians ==
- Walter Maioli: Arabic oboe, wooden flute, naj, bass flute, maranzano, bass harmonica, reeds, whistles, bells
- Daniele Cavallanti: soprano saxophone
- Antonio Cerantola: acoustic guitar, balalaika
- Otto Corrado: soprano saxophone, flute, bells
- Attilio Zanchi: acoustic guitar
- Marjon Klok: harp, tamboura, bells
- Trilok Gurtu: tabla, snake drums, Moroccan bongos, cymbals, xylophone, cow bells

With guests

- Marino Vismara: cello solo on "Mud"
- Maurizio Dones: viola solo on "Sar"
