= Matteo Silva =

German-born Italian composer and ethnomusicologist

Matteo Silva is a well known composer, music producer, ethnomusicologist and visual artist.

== Life and work ==
He was born in October 1960 in Ulm, Germany, from German mother and Italian father, grew up in Bologna, Italy, and Lugano, Switzerland, studied composition at Giuseppe Verdi Conservatory in Milan with Niccolò Castiglioni and philosophy in Venice with Emanuele Severino; he is founder of the independent music record label Amiata Records; as radio editor he collaborated with Rete 2, a cultural channel of the Swiss Broadcasting Corporation and produced the “Encyclopedia of World Music” in 76 volumes for the Italian RCS Rizzoli Group published by Fabbri; for the group “Espresso – La Repubblica” he produced, among other series, a popular CD series of “World Music”, a work that for the first time in Italy let music of less known cultures be accessible to a larger audience. Another project produced for the "Espresso - La Repubblica" group has been " La grande musica della Sardegna" a CD series on all different traditional music styles in Sardinia approached in a musicological way but published for the first time outside the academic circuits with great public success.

For Amiata Records, Wergo, and other independent record labels he produced more than 130 contemporary and ethnic music CDs in the USA, Germany, France and Italy. With Skeye music, he brought Carla Bruni and her first album “Quel qu’un m’à dit” to Italy just like the “Overhead” music group and other French and English artists. He produced music by artists like Arvo Pärt, Terry Riley, Steve Reich, Sainkho, Ustad Nishat Khan, i Fratelli Mancuso, Faraualla, Sangeeta Badyopadhnay, Michael Vetter, Hans Otte, Gabin Dabiré, the Club Musical Oriente Cubano, Chögyal Namkhai Norbu, the Monks of the Sera Jé Monastery, The Bauls of Bengal.

He often travelled to Asia, particularly in the Himalayan regions, where he documented and recorded several musical ceremonies of endangered ethnic groups such as the Bön and Gurung, and where he committed himself to the documentation of numerous Tibetan Buddhist ceremonies in exile and of the traditional songs of the nomads of the Kham region (eastern Tibet), of which he published a few CDs. In Italy, together with musicologist Walter Maioli, he has been the creator of the archaeological musical project, Synaulia. He also produced and edited the music of Synaulia for Amiata Records and published “The Music of Ancient Rome” in 2 volumes (volume I Wind Instruments, volume II String Instruments). Excerpts of this work have been licensed to several major films and TV Series such as [The Gladiator], [The Village], [Rome] and several documentaries produced by the BBC, the Swiss Broadcasting Corporation and RAI.

As composer he published the electronic music albums Solaris (1991) Ad Infinitum (1993) and Omphalos (2001) soundtracks of his sound&light installations. As a composer he also published the acoustic albums " Golden Grounds" (1981) and "Shiné, a way Inside" ( 2025). Apart from his producing and editing activities, Matteo Silva is also a visual artist, professor, author of essays, poetry and prose. As musicologist he wrote Music for Peace (1999), Beyond Music (2004), Copyright in digital media (2008). Matteo Silva has been director of the MIM ( Music Industry Management) Program at the European School of Economics in London.

== Recognitions ==
- 1998 Deutscher Schallplattenpreis for the album Naked Spirit of Sainkho Namtchylak
- 2000 Naird Award as the best independent producer of antique music
- 2002 Diapason d'Or for the cd Bella Maria of Fratelli Mancuso

== Bibliography ==
- Musiche dal mondo – The world music encyclopedia in 76 vol. - RCS/Fratelli Fabbri, Milan, Italy
- World Music – 15 vol. - Gruppo Editoriale L'Espresso/ La Repubblica, Rome, Italy
- La grande musica della Sardegna – 5 vol. - La Nuova Sardegna/ Gruppo Editoriale L'Espresso/ La Repubblica, Rome, Italy

== Discography ==
As composer:

- Matteo Silva, Golden Grounds, Odiyana Edition, Lugano 1989
- Matteo Silva, Solaris, Wind Recordings, Bari 1991
- Matteo Silva, Ad Infinitum, Amiata Records, Florence 1993
- Matteo Silva, Omphalos, Amiata Records, Florence 2001
- Matteo Silva, De Harmonices Mundi, Amiata Records, Firenze 2006

As music producer:

- Adea, Day & Night, Amiata Records, Florence 1996
- Alexandra - Arrigo Cappelletti, Terras Do Risco, Amiata Records, Florence 2001
- Alon Michael, Israel Edelson, Meditations of the Heart Vol. I, Amiata Records, Florence 1998
- Amelia Cuni, Werner Durand, Ashtayama, Amiata Records, Florence 1999
- Andrea Ceccomori & Antonio Rossi, The Celestine Suite, Amiata Records, Florence 1998
- Andrea Donati, Ape Regina, Amiata Records, Florence 1997
- Andrea Donati, Le Ciel De Ma Memoire, Amiata Records, Florence 1995
- Angelo Ricciardi, Song of Enlightenment, Amiata Records, Florence 1994
- Antonio Breschi, At the edge of the night, Amiata Records, Florence 1994
- Antonio Breschi, Toscana, Amiata Records, Florence 1996
- Antonio Infantino, Tara'ntrance, Amiata Records, Florence 2004
- Antonio Infantino & I Tarantolati, Tarantella Tarantata, Amiata Records, Florence 1996
- Astor Piazzolla, Thomas Fortmann, Tango Catolico, Amiata Records, Florance 1994
- Auria Vizia, New Dawn of the Sacred Flames, Amiata Records, Florence 1997
- Auria Vizia, Music for The Seven Chakras, Amiata Records, Florence 1996
- Ayub Ogada, Tanguru, Amiata Records, Rome, 2009
- Chogyal Namkhai N. Rinpoche Chöd, Cutting Through Dualism, Amiata Records, Florence 1992
- Chogyal Namkhai Norbu & Matteo Silva, Music for the Dance of Vajra, Amiata Records, 2000
- Fabio Forte, Asia Blue, Amiata Records, Florence 2001
- Faraualla, Sind', Amiata Records, Florence 2002
- Faraualla, Faraualla, Amiata Records, Florence 1999
- Flavio Piras, The Hands, Amiata Records, Florence 1996
- Fratelli Mancuso, Cantu, Amiata Records, Florence 2002
- Fratelli Mancuso, Requiem, Amiata Records, Florence 2008
- Fratelli Mancuso & Antonio Marangolo, Bella Maria, Amiata Records, Florence 1998
- Gabin Dabiré, Kontomè, Amiata Records, Florence 1996
- Gabin Dabiré, Afriki Djamana, Amiata Records, Florence 1994
- Gaspare Bernardi, L'Arco Terrestre, Amiata Records, Florence 2001
- Gianfranco Pernaiachi, Abendland, Amiata Records, Florence 1996
- Hans Otte, Aquarian Music, Amiata Records, Florence 1994
- Igor Koshkendey, Music From Tuva, Amiata Records, Florence 1997
- In a Split Second, It Happens, Amiata Records, Florence 1997
- Krishna Bhatt Kirwani, Music from India, Amiata Records, Florence 1995
- La Famille Dembelè, Aira Yo, La Dance Des Jeunes Griots, Amiata Records, Florence 1996
- Marino De Rosas, Meridies, Amiata Records, Florence 1999
- Mark Kostabi, Songs for Sumera, Amiata Records, Florence 2002
- Michael Vetter, Nocturne, Amiata Records, Florence 1993
- Michael Vetter, Ancient Voices, Amiata Records, Florence 1992
- Neji, Sat, Amiata Records, Florence 1996
- Nouthong Phimvilayphone, Visions of the Orient: Music from Laos, Amiata Records, Florence 1995
- Paolo Giaro Ensemble, Urbino, Amiata Records, Florence 1998
- Paolo Giaro, Krishna Bhatt, D. Gosh, Dancing In the Light of the Full Moon, Amiata Records, Florence 2006
- Paul Badura-Skoda, Schubert: The trout In the mirror of time, Amiata Records, Florence 1998
- Quartetto Bernini, J.S. BACH: L'Arte Della Fuga, Amiata Records, Florence 2001
- Radha, Radha, Amiata Records, Florence 2001
- Riccardo Fassi, In The Flow, Amiata Records, Florence 1993
- Roberto Laneri, Memories of the rain forest, Florence 1993
- Sainkho Namtchylak, Naked Spirit, Amiata Records, Florence 1998
- Sangeeta Bandyopadhyay/Vincenzo Mingiardi, Sangita, Amiata Records, Florence 2004
- Savio Riccardi, La Venere Di Willendorf, Amiata Records, Florence 1999
- S. Reich, A. Part, L. Einaudi, H. Otte, H. M. Gorecki, New Music Masters, Amiata Records, Florence 1996
- Surabhi Dreams of Sea & Sky, Amiata Records, Florence 1996
- Synaulia, The Music of Ancient Rome Vol. I, Amiata Records, Florence 1996
- Synaulia, The Music of Ancient Rome Vol. II, Amiata Records, Florence 2002
- Terry Riley, The Padova Concert, Amiata Records, Florence 1992
- The Bauls Of Bengal, A Man of Heart: Music from India, Amiata Records, Florence 1996
- The Saexophones, From Gesualdo To Sting, Amiata Records, Florence 1996
- Tibetan Monks/Sera Jé Monastery Tibet, Sera Jé, Amiata Records, Florence 1998
- Various Artists, Cantos a Kiterra, Amiata Records, Florence 1999
- Ustad Nishat Khan, Meeting Of Angels, Amiata Records, Florence 2003
- Ustad Nishat Khan, Raga KhanAmiata Records, Florence 2007
- A. Virgilio Savona, Cose delicate, Amiata Records, Florence 2005
- Whisky Trail, Chaosmos, Amiata Records, Florence 2006
- Charlette Shulamit Ottolenghi,Italia Ebraica, Amiata Records, Rome 2012
- Diana Garden, La Dolce Vita, Amiata Records, Florence 2003
- Diana Garden, Tribe, Amiata Records, Florence 2002
- Various Artists, African Angels, Amiata Records, Florence 1997
- Various Artists, Casa Italia, Amiata Records, Florence 2005
- Various Artists, Celtic Angels, Amiata Records, Florence 1997
- Various Artists, Colors, Amiata Records, Florence 1998
- Various Artists, Magnificat - Music for the Jubilee 2000, Amiata Records, Florence 2000
- Various Artists, Mediterranean Blue, Amiata Records, Florence 2003
- Various Artists, Morocco - Sounds from the ancient land, Amiata Records, Florence 1998
- Various Artists, Premio Città Di Recanati Vol.I, Amiata Records, Florence 2001
- Various Artists, Premio Città Di Recanati Vol.II, Amiata Records, Florence 2002
- Various Artists, Sacred Planet, Amiata Records, Florence 1998
- Various Artists, Viva Cuba Libre, Amiata Records, Florence 2000
- Various Artists, Voices of Africa, Amiata Records, Amiata Records, Florence 1997
- Various Artists, Winds & Strings of Africa, Amiata Records, Florence 1997
- Various Artists, Drums of Africa, Amiata Records, Florence 1997
