= Antonio Infantino =

Antonio Infantino may refer to:

- Antonio Infantino (musician) (1944–2018), Italian musician and poet
- Antonio Infantino (sprinter) (1991), British-Italian sprinter
