= Music of ancient Rome =

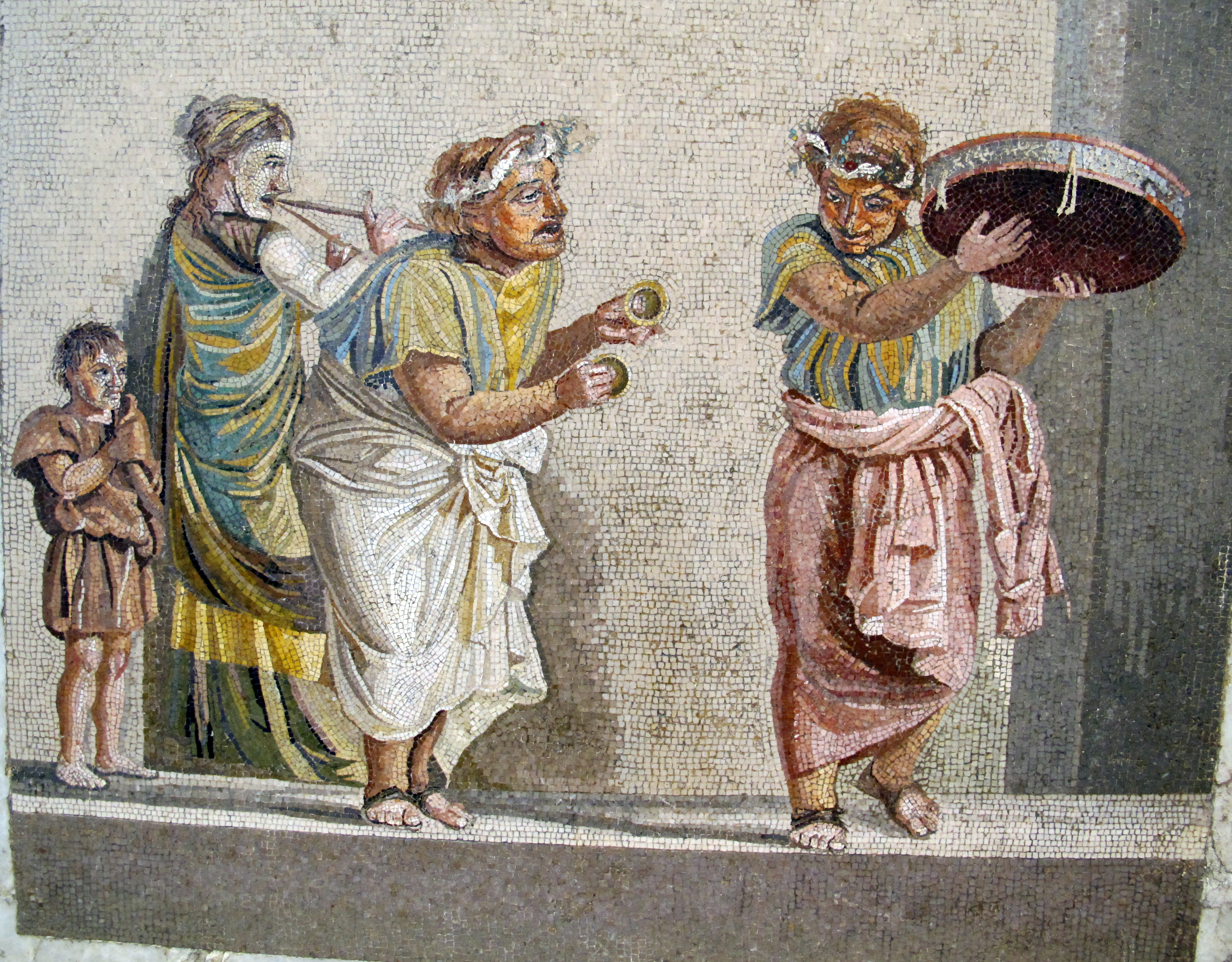
Trio of musicians playing an aulos, cymbala, and tympanum (mosaic from Pompeii)

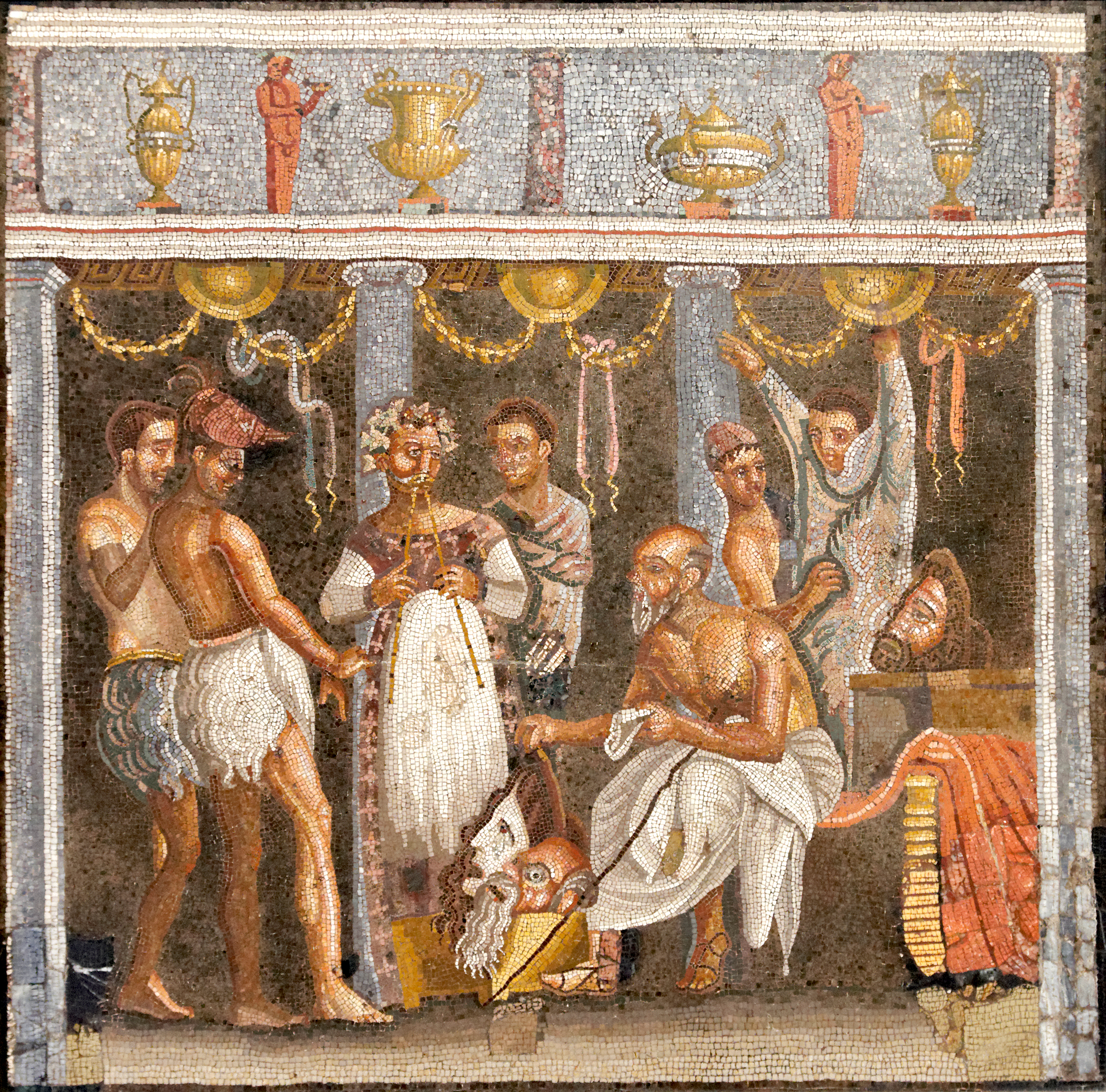
Masked theatrical troupe around an aulos player (mosaic from the House of the Tragic Poet, Pompeii)

The music of ancient Rome was a part of Roman culture from the earliest of times. Songs (carmina) were an integral part of almost every social occasion. The Secular Ode of Horace, for instance, was commissioned by Augustus and performed by a mixed children's choir at the Secular Games in 17 BC. Music was customary at funerals, and the tibia (Greek aulos), a woodwind instrument, was played at sacrifices to ward off ill influences. Under the influence of ancient Greek theory, music was thought to reflect the orderliness of the cosmos, and was associated particularly with mathematics and knowledge.

Etruscan music had an early influence on that of the Romans. During the Imperial period, Romans carried their music to the provinces, while traditions of Asia Minor, North Africa, and Gaul became a part of Roman culture.

Music accompanied public spectacles, events in the arena, and was part of the performing art form called pantomimus, an early form of story ballet that combined expressive dancing, instrumental music, and a sung libretto.

== History ==
Ancient Roman music and singing originated from Etruscan music, and then Ancient Greek music. During its early history, it was mostly used for military purposes. According to Cicero, Roman musical tradition was adapted during the reign of Numa Pompilius. The Greek philosopher and mathematician Pythagoras was able to find the first 7 pitches in a scale and this knowledge carried over into the Roman Empire.

== Music in society ==
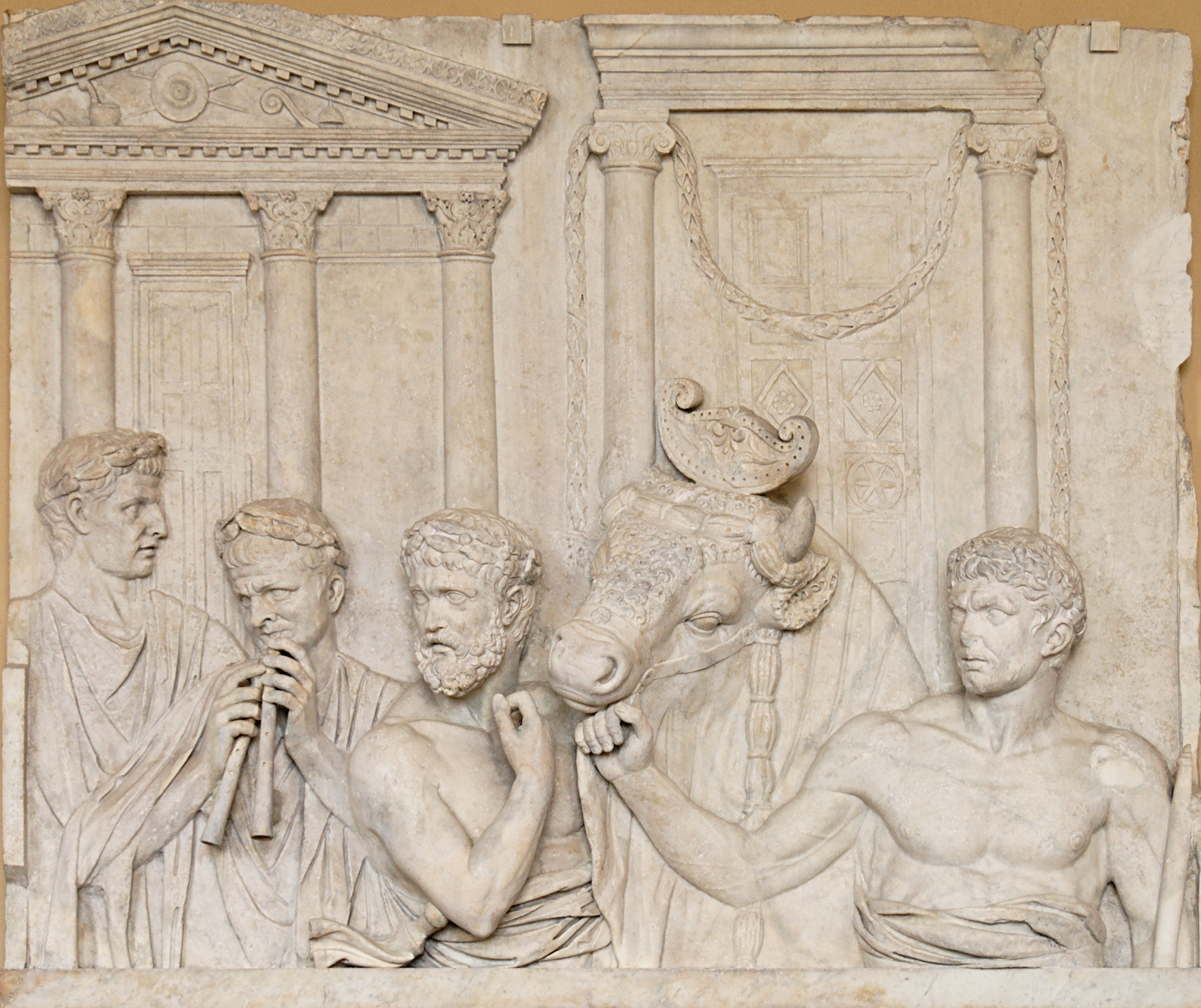
Depiction of a Roman animal sacrifice

Music was an important aspect of Roman religious rituals. It was used to set the rhythm of the ritual and invoke certain emotions. Various instruments had different roles in Roman religion. Ancient Roman art displays tibicines, or players of the tibia, playing behind altars. They are depicted wearing a toga with a head covering while perform an animal sacrifice. Some depictions show assistants holding the acerra or tankards and cups to assist the tibicen. The tibia was likely the most important instrument in the Roman Imperial cult. Tibicen were also used to drown out any distracting noise. To the ancient Romans, it must have been unimaginable for a sacrifice to lack music. Music, usually pipe music, would accompany public prayers. Cymbals and drums were used in rituals of the cult of Cybele and rattles were important to the cult of Isis. Female musicians, dancers, and singers would perform at a festival for the goddess Isis who had a temple in Rome. They would also perform at a festival dedicated to the Bona Dea. Several ancient Roman monuments were consecrated by musicians. The Salian priests would dance and sing while moving through the city in honor of Mars. Musicians would also play the flute to worship Mars. The Arval Brethren would also sing and dance to honor the goddess Ceres. Titus Livius, a Roman historian, described an incident where players of the flute were barred from eating and drinking in the temples. Afterward, they retreated to Tivoli, and were allowed to continue eating and drinking in the temples when the Senate realized there were no musicians for religious services. Processions of trumpeters and dancers were also important to the Pompa circensis, which was a parade that preceded the games before religious festivals.

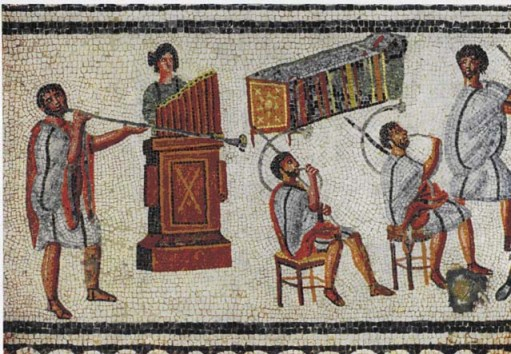
Musicians in a detail from the Zliten mosaic (2nd century AD), originally shown as accompanying gladiator combat and wild-animal events in the arena: from left, the tuba, hydraulis (water pipe organ), and two cornua

Music was a popular form of entertainment in ancient Rome. It was important to ancient Roman games. Gladiatorial fights began with a blast of horns and were accompanied by music. Musicians, usually players of the tuba or large aerophones would play during triumphs. The tibia was used to draw in the viewer's attention during the ceremony and a trumpet was used to announce the presence of the triumphator. Music was also used to silence the crowd. Music, primarily pipe music, held an important place in ancient Roman theatre. During plays, the actors, pantomimes, and tragedians would be accompanied by a chorus of singers and an orchestra of wind or percussion instruments. They would dance to the tune of the instruments. Musicians could be driven off of the stage for even small musical errors. The tune of the instruments would signify the emotions and traits of the characters and the pace of the story. Music was also used to ensure the story remained in the memory of audiences.

Romans would sometimes hold private musical concerts known as symphoniaci. These parties were associated with debauchery in ancient Rome. Lucius Calpurnius Piso Caesoninus, the consul in 58 BCE, was known to hold such parties. His house was described as filled with "singing and cymbals." Private musicians could be hired to provide entertainment during dinners or parties. Sometimes these private musicians were specially trained slaves. Ancient Roman women are depicted as having sung and danced in the privacy of their homes. Women in ancient Rome had different instruments from men. They played the harp, the aulos, and smaller lyres. Domitian established contests that included music, gymnastics, and riding competitions. Nero created the Quinquennial Neronia, which was a festival involving musical competitions. The Actian games, which was an ancient Roman festival of Apollo, also held musical competitions. The Greeks and Romans might have held musical performances in between the meal and the drinking party during dinner.

The cornu and other instruments such as the tuba were used to give signals in the ancient Roman military. There were collegia dedicated to musicians. One collegium made up of flute and lyre players was attested for the first time in the second century CE. The collegium syphoniacorum would play at religious or official ceremonies. Another collegium, the Collegium tibicinum romanorum was dedicated to perform at public funerals. Musicians' Collegia were highly respected in ancient Rome. They were used to preserve and perfect ancient Roman musical practices.

== Education and training ==
Musical training and skills were common amongst the Roman upper-class, and it may have been especially common amongst female Romans of the upper-class. Singers were expected to spend large amounts of time and energy practicing their craft. In ancient Rome, the term for music or speech teachers was phonascus. They focused on developing the flexibility of their student's voice. It also believed that a singer's neck should be soft and smooth to ensure that the voice did not sound harsh or broken. Marcus Tullius Cicero stated that musicians "sit for many years practicing delivery, and every day, before they begin to speak, gradually arouse their voices while lying in bed; and when they have done that they sit up and make their voices run down from the highest to the lowest level, in some way joining the highest and the lowest together." According to The Twelve Caesars, Nero would train his voice by avoiding harmful fruits and drinks, purging himself with vomiting and enemas, and lying on his back with a lead sheet on his chest. Quintilian believed that maintaining good physical health through diet and exercise was important to maintain a proper voice. According to Quintilian, abstaining from sex was also important for a singer. Other ancient texts describe singers perform warm-up exercises consisting of vocalized successive sounds before singing. There may have been "music schools" for musicians of low class.

== Cultural views ==
In ancient Rome music was confined to domestic settings. Plutarch praises a man named Numerius Furius, who is said to have sung when it was "appropriate." Music had some negative connotations in Roman society. Cornelius Nepos, a Roman historian and biographer, in his biography of the 4th century BC Greek general Epaminondas describes his famed skill at music and dancing as a negative characteristic. He described his musical talents as: "trivial, or rather, contemptible". Plutarch wrote that the prominence of the flute in Theban society was designed by their legislators to "relax and mollify their strong and impetuous natures in earliest boyhood." The ancient Romans considered music to be a powerful tool and believed that it was capable of inciting strong emotions in people. Cicero and Aristides Quintilianus believed that music was capable of ennobling the populace. Quintilian believed that music was "the most beautiful art" and that it was necessary for properly reading the work of ancient poets. It was a common belief throughout the Roman world that traditional styles of music should be maintained. Pliny wrote that musicians would change their art based on popular demand. Cicero discussed the superior quality of traditional Roman music. He describes archaic Roman music as civilizing the "barbaric." Cicero believed that musical education could help aspiring politicians learn to better listen to other's arguments and detect imperfections. Numerous ancient Roman writers such as Plato, Seneca, or Cicero believed that music could effeminize men. Female musicians were highly respected compared to male musicians. It was seen as a potential way of enhancing their attractiveness. However, being too skilled at music, when combined with other activities which were seen as less respectable, such as prostitution made one seem less respectable. Music was also considered inappropriate for married women or older women. Cicero once wrote:

For I agree with Plato that nothing so easily flows into young and impressionable minds as the various notes of the musical scale; it is hard to express the extent of their power in one way or the other. For music animates the indolent and calms the excited; it causes spirits to relax at one moment and then restrains them the next. Many states in Greece considered it important to preserve the ancient style of music; yet their morals changed along with their songs and slid to decadence as a result. Either they were corrupted by the sweet seductiveness of music, as some people think, or, once the stringency of their morals was undermined by their other vices, then their ears and minds became changed, leaving room for this musical change also. For this reason the wisest and by far the most learned man in Greece was greatly afraid of this decline. For he denies that the laws of music can be changed without heralding a change in the laws of the state. However, I for one do not think that this should be feared so greatly, although it should not be overlooked either. Indeed, [we see] how the theatre, which once used to be filled with the tunes of Livius and Naevius, pleasing in their simplicity, is now filled with people who leap up and toss their heads and roll their eyes in time with the twists and turns of the music. In the old days, Greece used to punish such behaviour harshly, anticipating far in advance how the deadly plague might sink gradually into the minds of citizens and suddenly overturn entire states with evil pursuits and evil ideas—if, indeed, it is true that stern Sparta ordered the strings above the number of seven to be cut off the lyre of Timotheus.

— Marcus Tullius Cicero

In early Christianity and among the Late Antique church fathers, there were lively discussions about the significance and meaning of music.

== Instruments ==
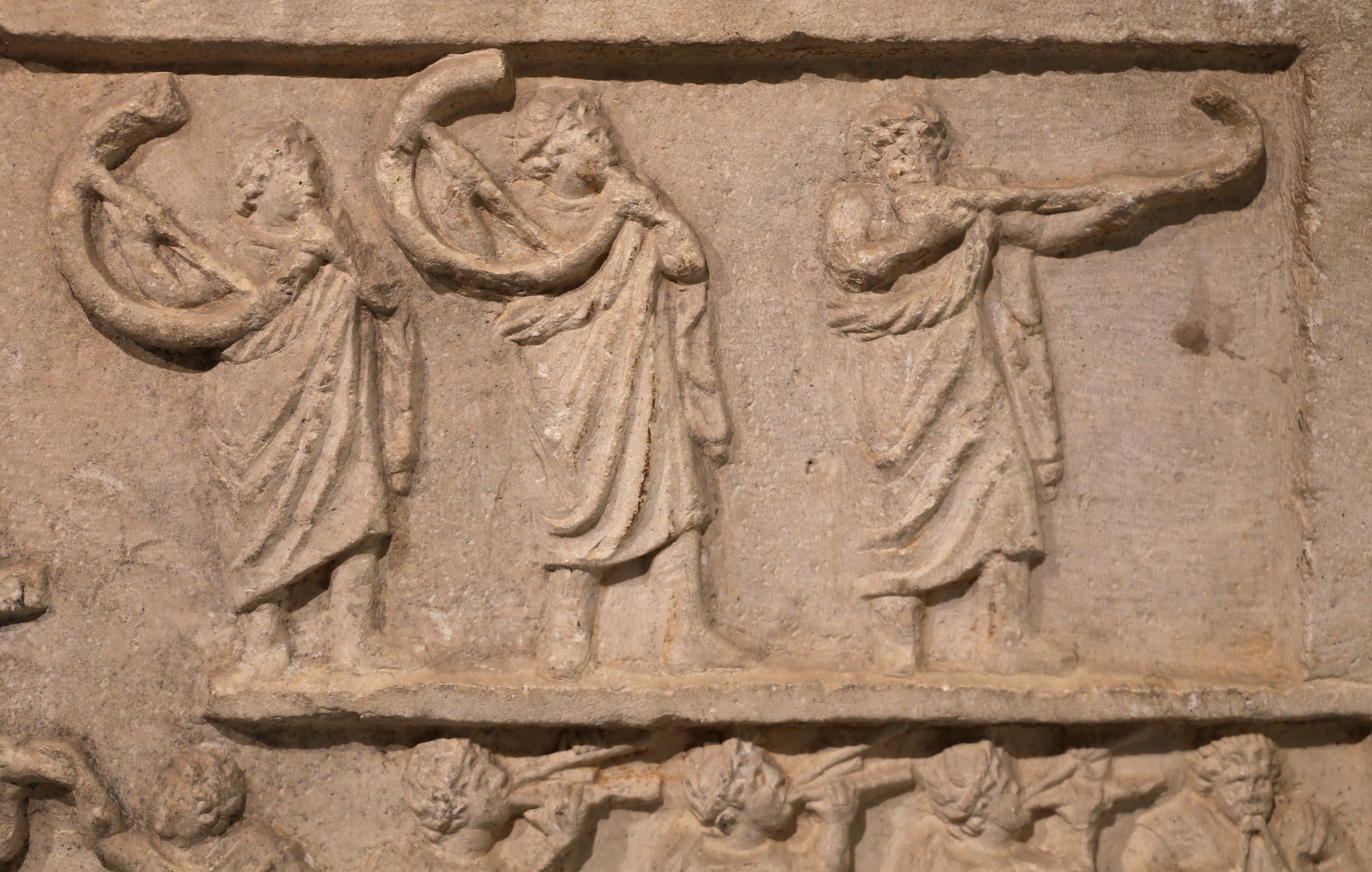
Ancient Roman musicians playing cornu and tibia curva.

Roman art depicts various woodwinds, "brass", percussion and stringed instruments. Roman-style instruments are found in parts of the Empire where they did not originate, and indicate that music was among the aspects of Roman culture that spread throughout the provinces.

=== Wind instruments ===
- The Roman tuba was a long, straight bronze trumpet with a detachable, conical mouthpiece like that of the modern French horn. Extant examples are about 1.3 meters long, and have a cylindrical bore from the mouthpiece to the point where the bell flares abruptly, similar to the modern straight trumpet seen in presentations of 'period music'. Since there were no valves, the tuba was capable only of a single overtone series that would probably sound familiar to the modern ear, given the limitations of musical acoustics for instruments of this construction. In the military, it was used for "bugle calls". The tuba is also depicted in art such as mosaics accompanying games (ludi) and spectacle events.
- The cornu (Latin "horn") was a long tubular metal wind instrument that curved around the musician's body, shaped rather like an uppercase G. It had a conical bore (again like a French horn) and a conical mouthpiece. It may be hard to distinguish from the buccina. The cornu was used for military signals and parades. The cornicen was a military signal officer who translated orders into calls. Like the tuba, the cornu also appears as accompaniment for public events and spectacle entertainments.
- The tibia (Greek aulos – αὐλός), usually double, had two double-reed (as in a modern oboe) pipes, not joined but generally played with a mouth-band capistrum (Greek phorbeiá - φορβεία) to hold both pipes steadily between the player's lips. Modern changes indicate that they produced a low, clarinet-like sound. There is some confusion about the exact nature of the instrument; alternate descriptions indicate each pipe having a single reed (like a modern clarinet) instead of a double reed.
- The askaules – a bagpipe.
- Versions of the modern flute and panpipes.
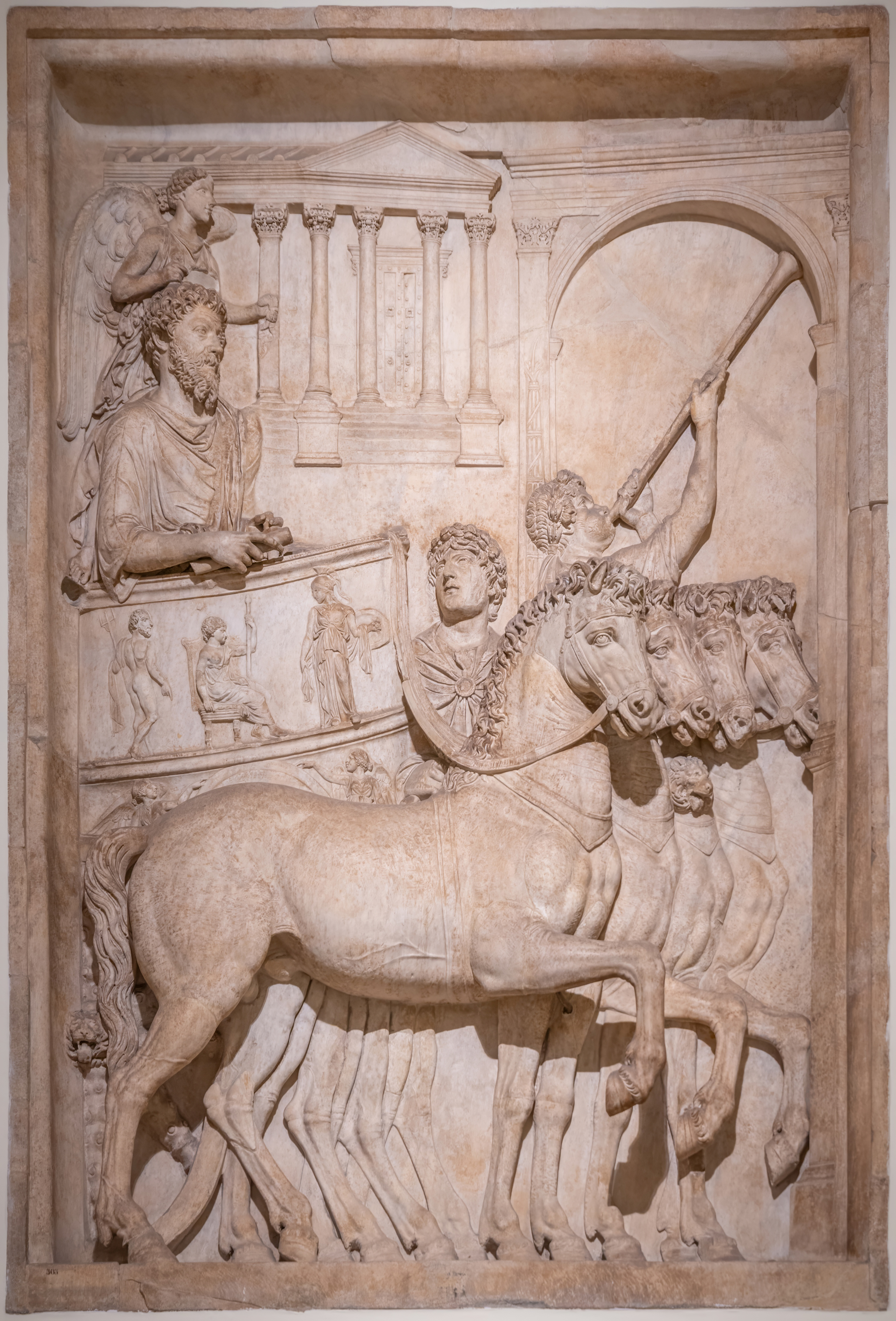
Tuba player (upper right) in a relief in Rome's Palazzo dei Conservatori depicting Marcus Aurelius in triumph

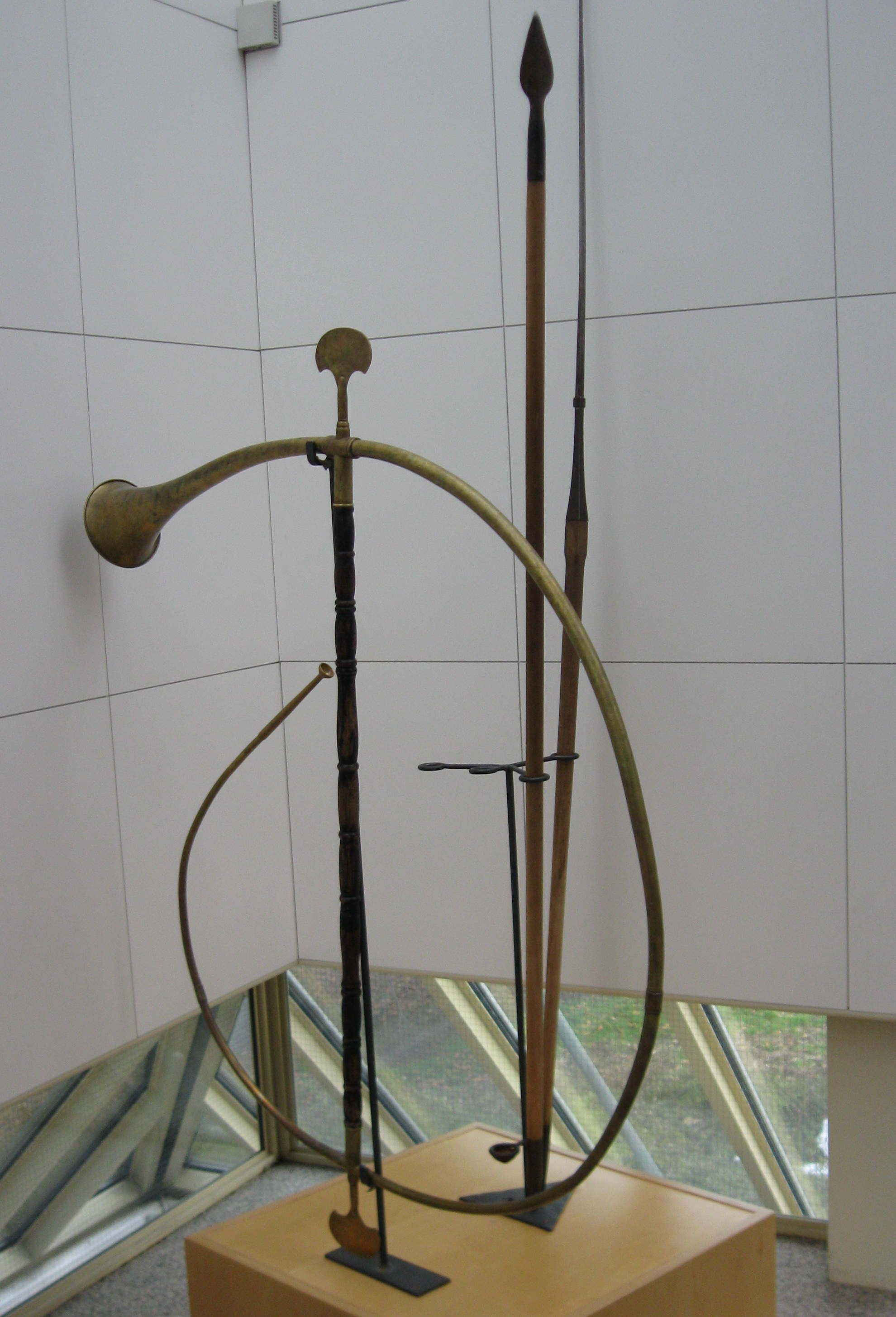
Cornu at the Limesmuseum in Aalen, Germany

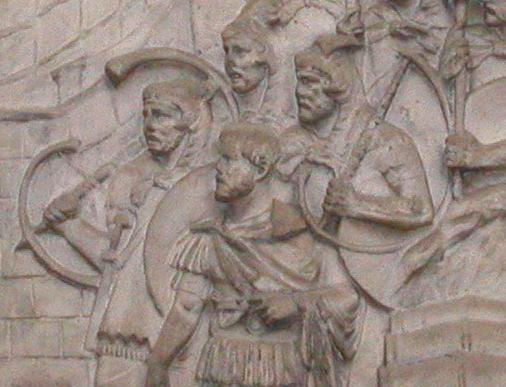
Cornicines on Trajan's Column (2nd century)

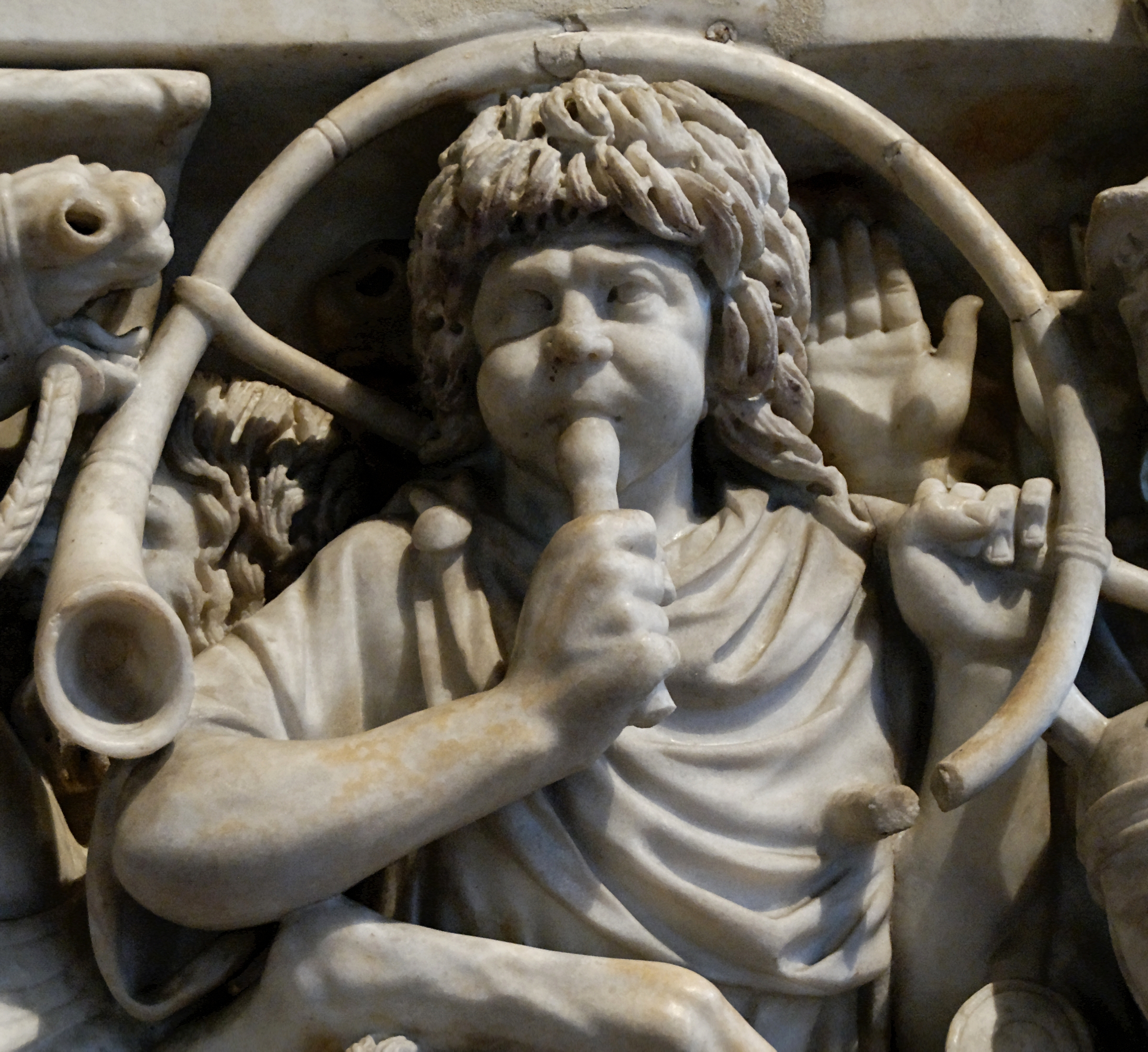
Horn player on the Ludovisi sarcophagus (3rd century)

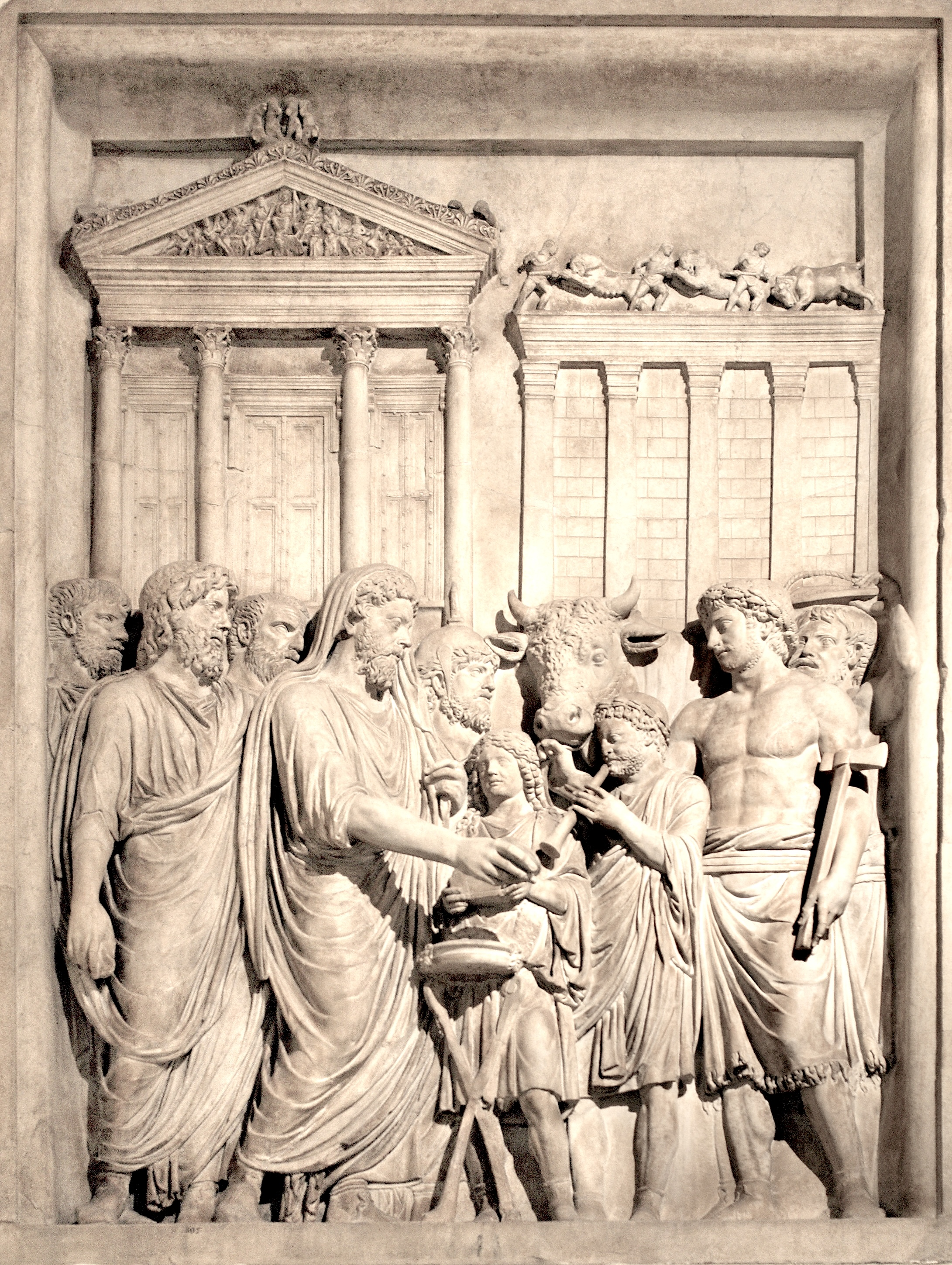
Tibia player accompanying a sacrifice led by Marcus Aurelius (Rome's Palazzo dei Conservatori)

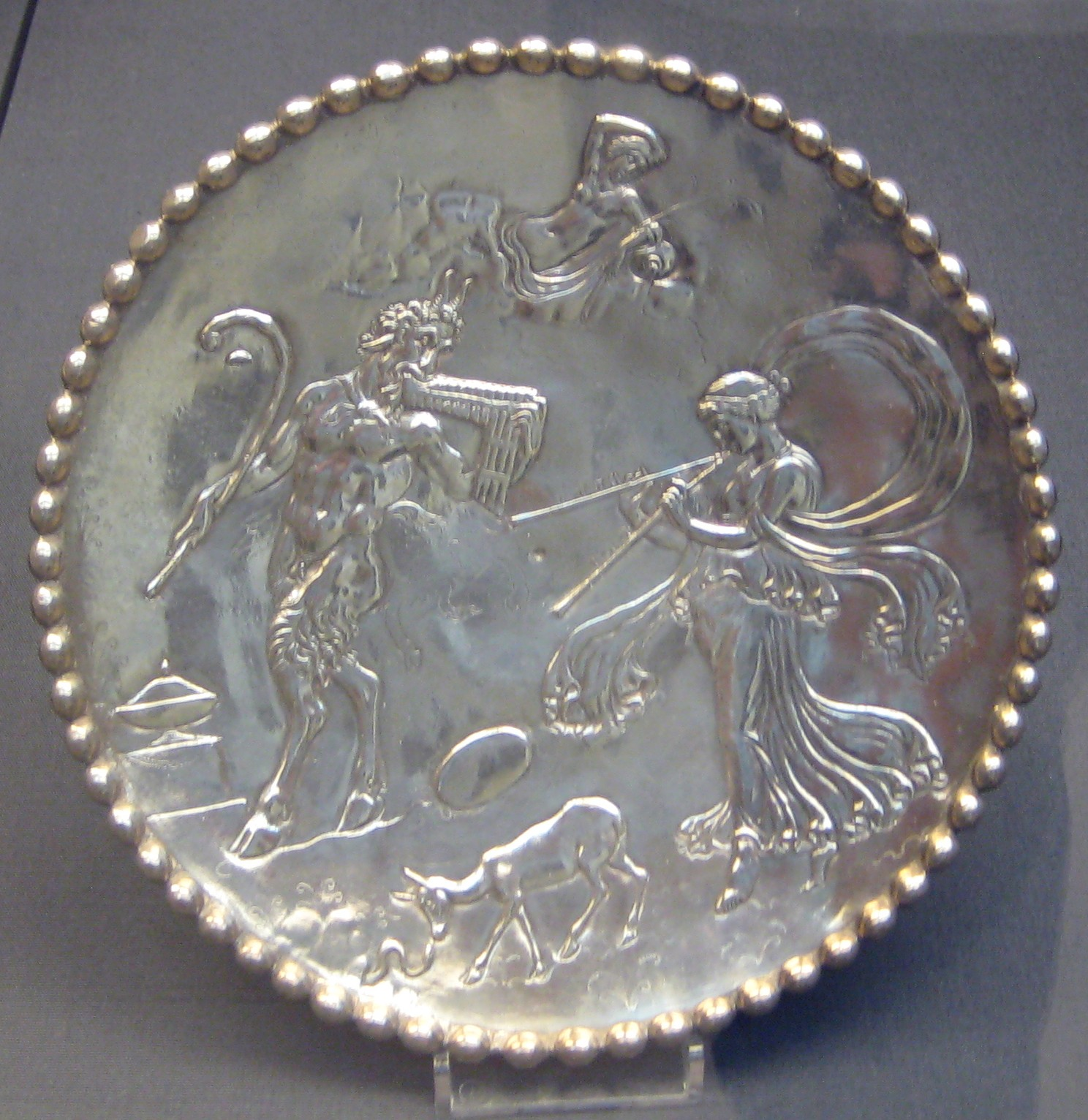
Panpipes played by Pan and aulos by a maenad (Mildenhall Treasure, 4th century)

=== String instruments ===
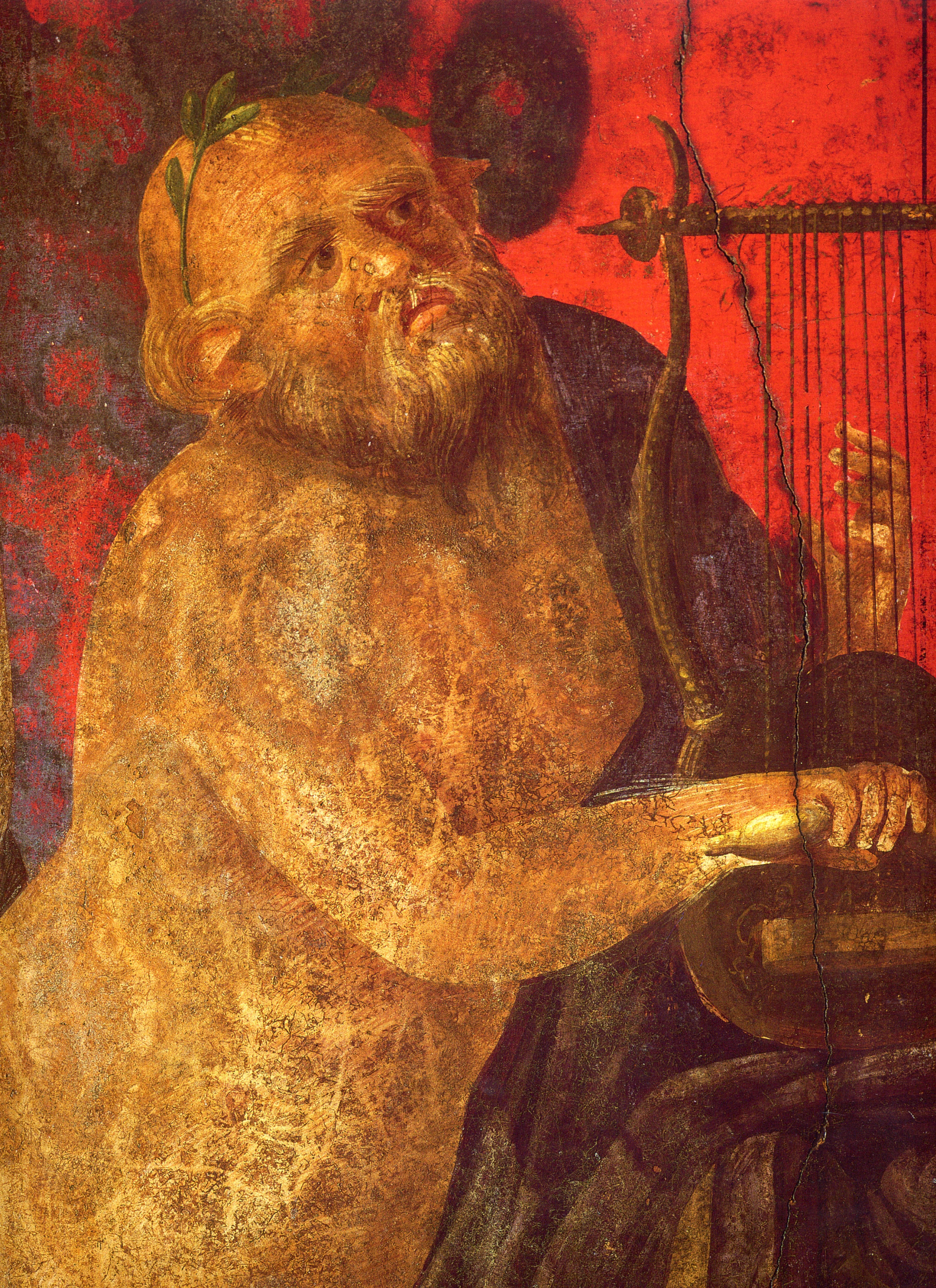
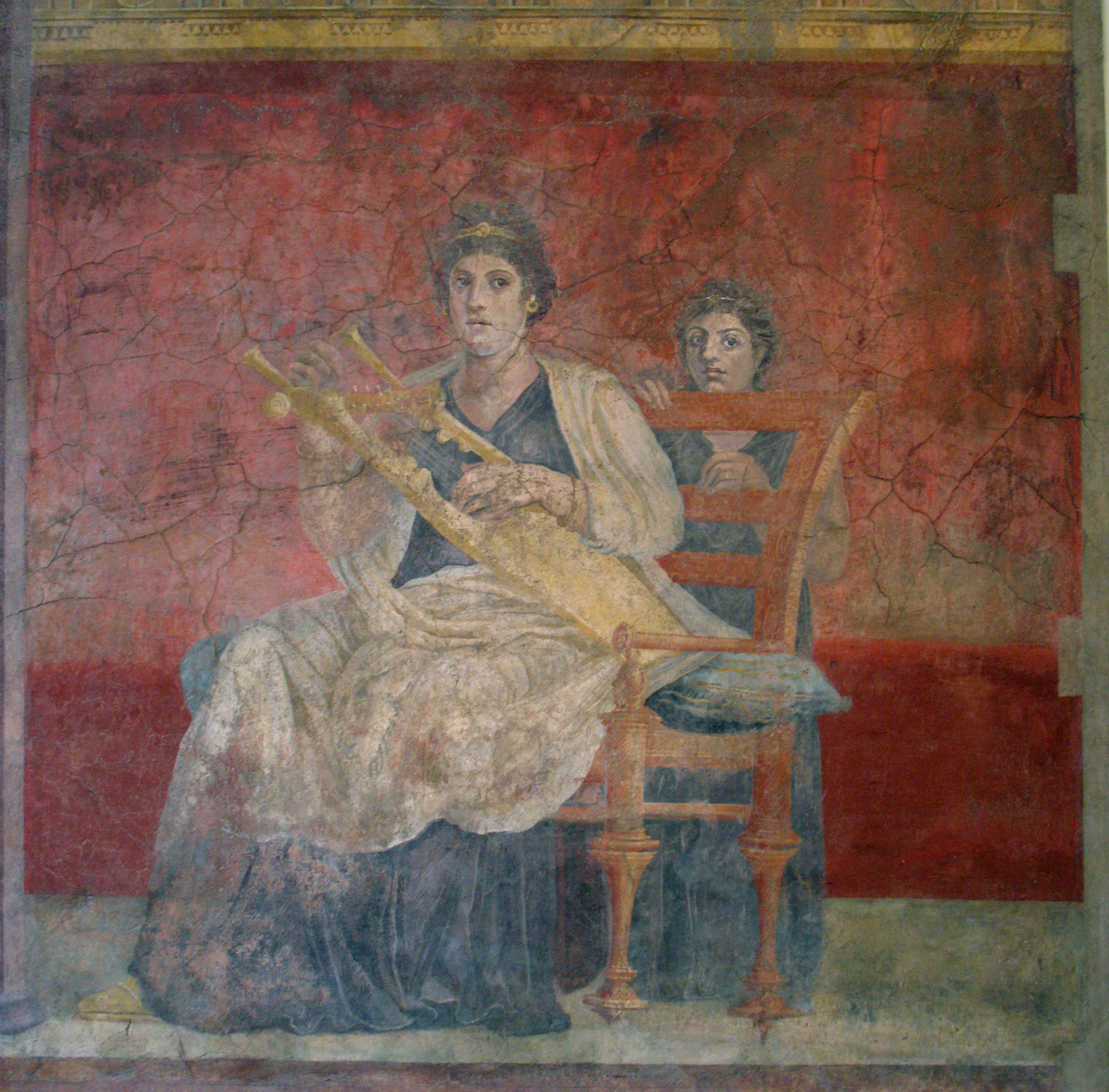
Left image:: Silenus holding a lyre, detail of a fresco from the Villa of the Mysteries, Pompeii, Italy, c. 50 BC
Right image: wall fresco of a seated woman with a kithara, 40-30 BC, from the Villa Boscoreale of P. Fannius Synistor; late Roman Republic; it most likely represents Berenice II of Ptolemaic Egypt wearing a stephane (i.e. royal diadem) on her head.
- The lyre, borrowed from the Greeks, was not a harp, but instead had a sounding body of wood or a tortoise shell covered with skin, and arms of animal horn or wood, with strings stretched from a cross bar to the sounding body. The strings were tuned "by adjusting sticks seen in the engraving."
- The cithara was a seven-stringed instrument used by the ancient Romans similar to the modern guitar.
- The lute (pandura or monochord) was known by several names among the Greeks and Romans. In construction, the lute differs from the lyre in having fewer strings stretched over a solid neck or fretboard, on which the strings can be stopped to produce graduated notes. Each lute string is thereby capable of producing a greater range of notes than a lyre string. Although long-necked lutes are depicted in art from Mesopotamia as early as 2340–2198 BC, and also occur in Egyptian iconography, the lute in the Greco-Roman world was far less common than the lyre and cithara. The lute of the medieval West is thought to owe more to the Arab oud, from which its name derives (al ʿūd).
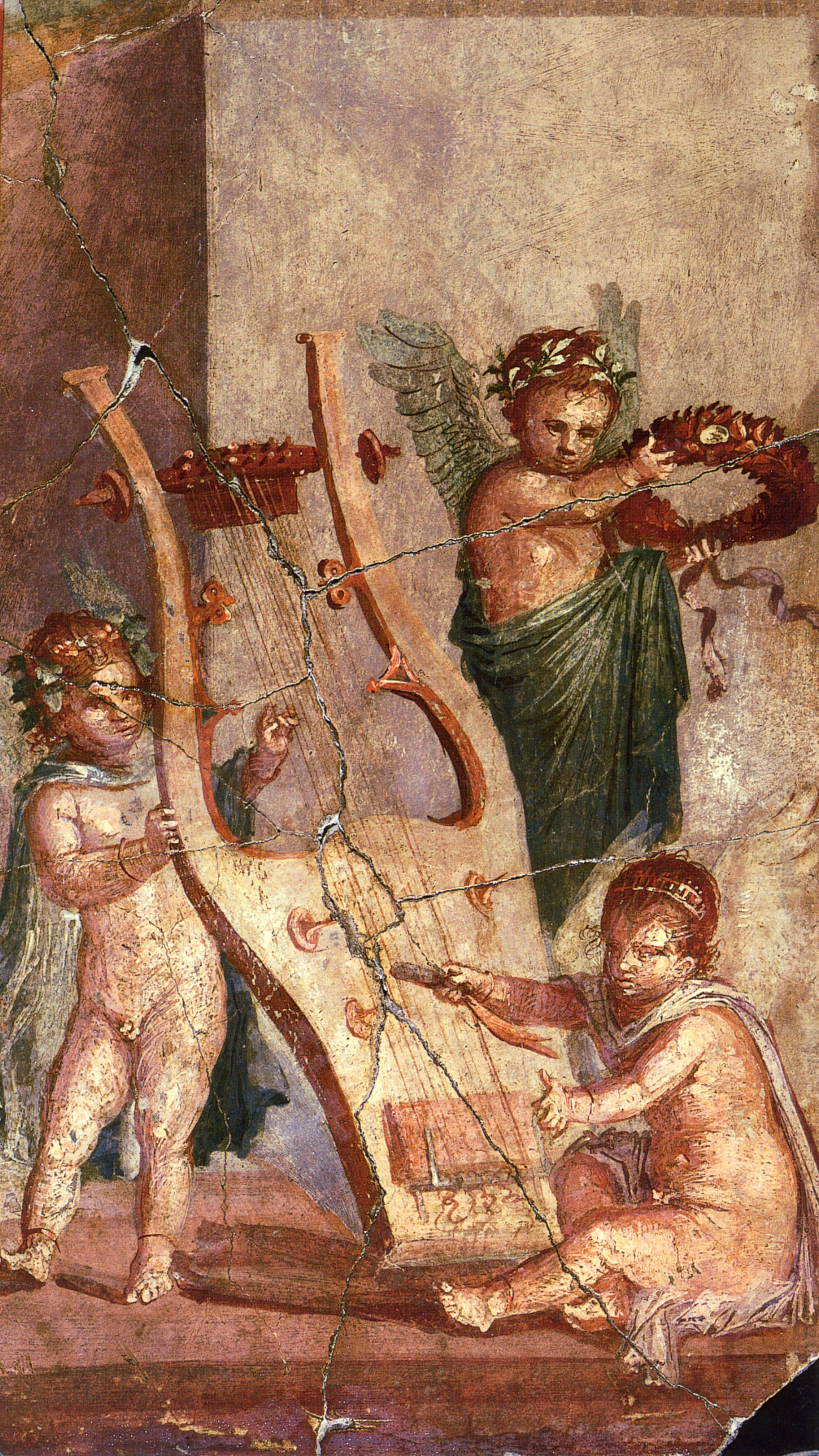
Cupids playing with a lyre, a Roman fresco from Herculaneum

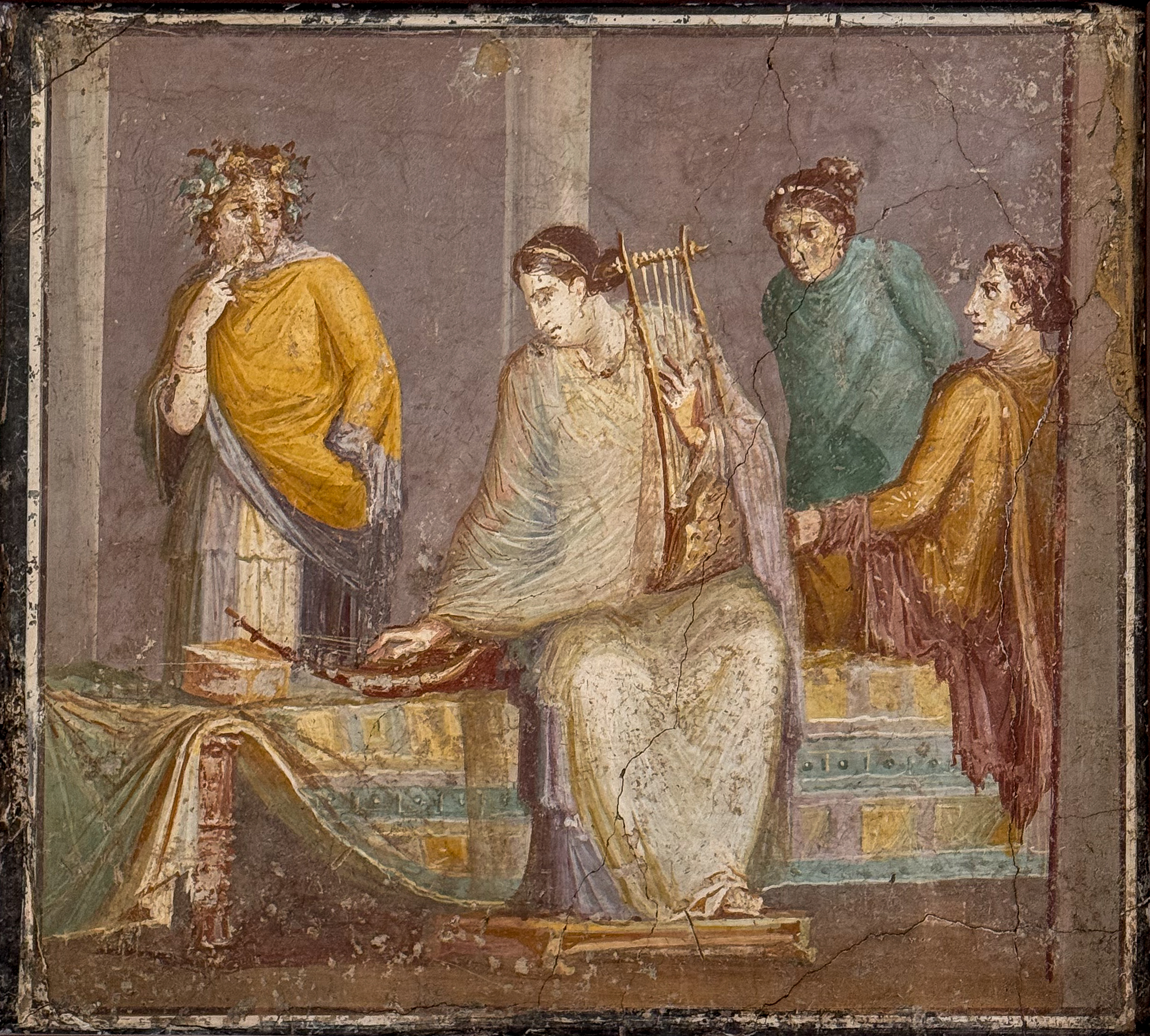
Woman with cithara (right) and sambuca (left). Fresco from Pompeii, 1st century (National Archaeological Museum, Naples)

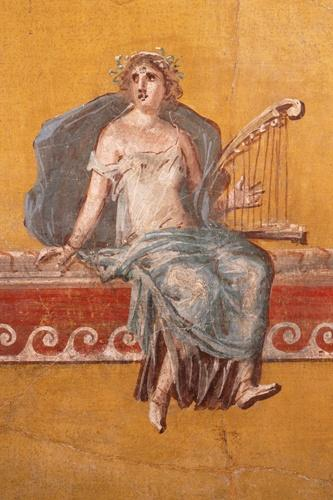
1st-century Roman wall painting of a harpist with arched harp

=== Organs ===
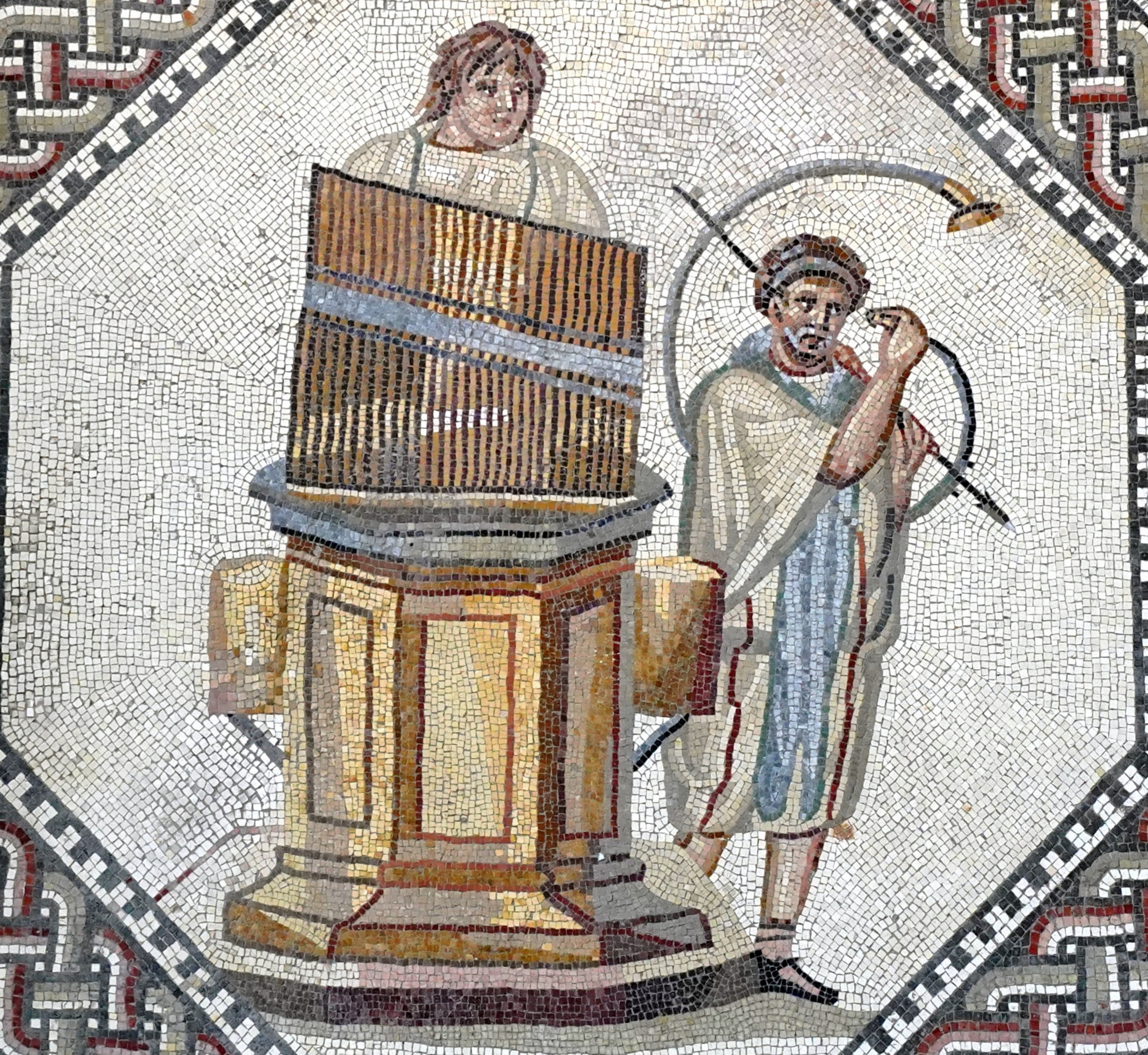
Hydraulis and cornu on a mosaic from Nennig, Germany

Mosaics depict instruments that look like a cross between the bagpipe and the organ. The pipes were sized to produce many of the modes (scales) learned from the Greeks. It is unclear whether they were blown by the lungs or by some mechanical bellows. The hydraulic pipe organ (hydraulis), which worked by water pressure, was "one of the most significant technical and musical achievements of antiquity". Essentially, the air to the pipes that produce the sound comes from a mechanism of a wind-chest connected by a pipe to a dome submerged in a tank of water. Air is pumped into the top of the dome, compressing the air and forcing the water out the bottom; the displaced water rises in the tank. This increased hydraulic head and the compression of the air in the dome provides a steady supply of air to the pipes The hydraulis accompanied gladiator contests and events in the arena, as well as stage performances. It might also be found in homes, and was among the instruments that the emperor Nero played.

=== Percussion ===
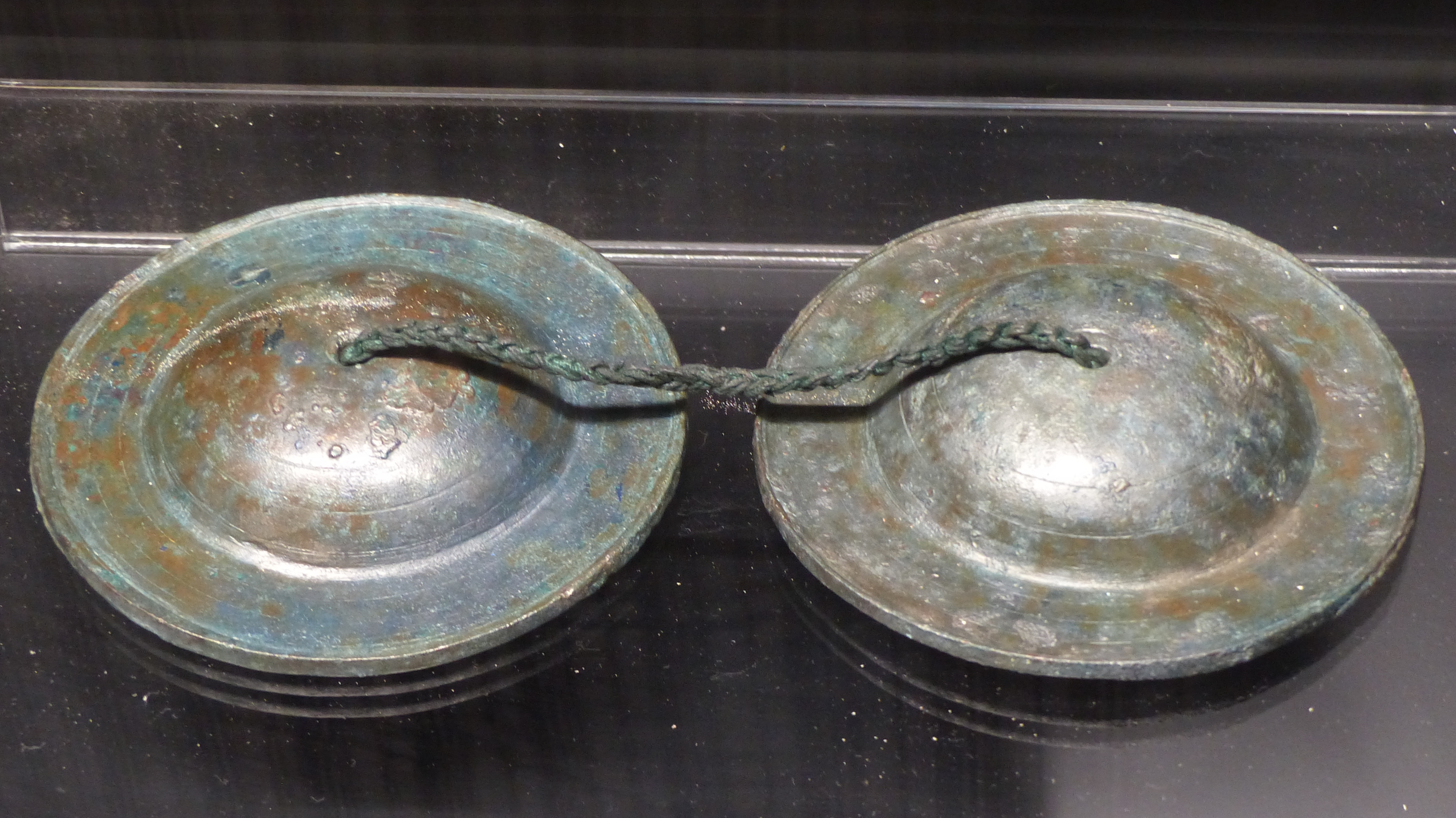
Pair of 1st century AD bronze cymbals from Pompeii, preserved at the National Archaeological Museum, Naples

- Variations of a hinged wooden or metal device called a scabellum—a "clapper"—used to beat time. Also, there were various rattles, bells, and tambourines.
- The sistrum was a rattle consisting of rings strung across the cross-bars of a metal frame, which was often used for ritual purposes.
- Cymbala (Lat. plural of cymbalum, from the Greek kymbalon) were small cymbals: metal discs with concave centers and turned rims, used in pairs which were clashed together.

== Dance ==
The Salii and the Arval Brethren were ancient Roman organizations of priests who danced at religious festivals. Dance was used to thank the gods and it held an important place in the Dionysia. Before battles Roman soldiers could hold dances to honor the god Mars. Music and dancing was also used to ensure the efficacy of sacrifices. Varro, a Roman author, wrote that dance was used in religious festivals as "no part of the body should be debarred from religious experiences." Dance was a popular form of entertainment in ancient Rome. Ovid describes drunk people dancing and singing in the streets during festivals such as the Anna Perenna. The Romans would hire dancers from conquered nations or train slaves to dance. Female dancers known as crotalisterias danced using bells and clappers. Another popular kind of dance was tripudia, which were three-foot dances. Pantomimists were popular in ancient Roman theatre. They wore cloaks, masks with closed mouths, and costumes. Plutarch described ancient Roman pantomimes twisting, leaping, and standing like a statue. He also wrote that criminals may be condemned to dancing in festivals. Dancing was used as way to accentuate beauty and could be erotic. Private dance schools trained ancient Roman aristocrats. Improper dance in ancient Rome, was defined as being un-Roman. Foreign dancing styles were disliked. Elagabalus was heavily scrutinized for his usage of foreign dances. Cornelius Nepos associated dance and music with ancient Greek culture, and treated it with disdain. Cicero stated that no sober person would dance unless they were a "lunatic." He likely did not object to the usage of dance as entertainment, but instead considered it to be beneath the upper-class Romans. Cicero may have believed that it should be relegated to only lower-class professional dancers. It is also possible he was exclusively referring to erotic or foreign dancing. Scipio Aemilianus criticized dancers for "improper display of their bodies."

== Discography ==
- Synaulia, Music of Ancient Rome, Vol. I – Wind Instruments - Amiata Records ARNR 1396, Florence, 1996.
- Synaulia, Music of Ancient Rome, Vol. II – String Instruments - Amiata Records, ARNR 0302, Rome, 2002.
- Thaleia, Carmina Canere Music of Ancient Rome, Vol. I –Tarragona - Spain 2012.
- Ludi Scaenici, E Tempore Emergo - Rome, Italy - 2001
- Ludi Scaenici, Festina Lente - Rome, Italy - 2011
- Ensemble Kérylos, dir. Annie Bélis, De la pierre au son : musique de l'antiquité, K617, 1996.
- Ensemble Kérylos, dir. Annie Bélis, D'Euripide aux premiers chrétiens : musique de l'antiquité, 2016.

== See also ==
- Music of ancient Greece
- Music in ancient India
- Fibula (penile), a device used by Roman singers in the belief that it would help preserve their voice
