= Amiata Records =

Italian independent record label

Amiata Records is an independent cross-cultural record label founded in 1992 by Matteo Silva and Marc Eagleton with offices in Rome. The website is: www.amiatarecords.com

Amiata derives its name from a mountain in southern Tuscany, in Italy. AMIATA's motto is "The Most Meaningful Sound Next to Silence", a phrase taken from a 1995 review of AMIATA releases in Audiophile Recording, a British audiophile magazine. Amiata records publishes world music, ethnic music, folk, contemporary classical music, ancient music, jazz and electronic music.

== History ==
The first AMIATA release was Ad Infinitum in 1992 by Italian composer and label founder Matteo Silva. For some years Amiata Records specialised in new music, releasing recordings by experimental artists like Michael Vetter and Gianfranco Pernaiachi; minimalistic composers like Terry Riley, Hans Otte and Steve Reich, vocalists like Sainkho Namtchylak, Faraualla, Amelia Cuni, saxophonist Angelo Ricciardi, flutist Andrea Ceccomori, guitarists Dominic Miller and Paolo Giaro, bassists Andrea Donati and Enzo Pietropaoli and string quartets like the Bernini Quartet.

The label's repertoire consisting mostly of original compositions by the artists and often large booklets, sophisticated packaging and minimalist cover art. There is a link between some AMIATA recordings and so-called world music, especially the folk recordings and arrangements by the Fratelli Mancuso, the work of Antonio Infantino and Ustad Nishat Khan. Other examples of AMIATA's world music are records by the Bauls of Bengal, Tibetan Lama Namkhai Norbu Rinpoche, Indian virtuoso Zakir Hussain, Gabin Dabiré and the Ensemble Club musical Oriente Cubano.

The AMIATA New Series was created to document Western contemporary classical works — the first of these was the world-premiere recording of Hans Otte Aquarian Music who gave to the series a certain minimalist approach confirmed by other releases of music by Steve Reich, Terry Riley, Ludovico Einaudi, Arvo Pärt.

On many releases, the multicultural and classical sides of AMIATA are combined: for example, Ustad Nishat Khan's Meeting of Angels features him playing sitar solos over the Ensemble Gilles Binchois singing Gregorian chant.

The label was distributed in the USA for many years by Ryko Distribution and after Warner Bros. Records acquisition of Ryko by the independent MVD Entertainment Group. Matteo Silva continues to take an active interest in the music released by the label, acting as producer on most of its recordings. The typical AMIATA session is just three days — two days to record, one day to mix. Silva in general dislikes overdubbing.

== Catalogue ==
The catalogue numbers over a hundred titles presented in seven series - Secret World, Roots, New Music, Cutting Edge, Inner Arts, Classica and Multimedia Arts.

== Design ==
The label is internationally known for the design and packaging of its album covers.

== Some Amiata Records releases ==
  - Adea, Day & Night, Amiata Records, Florence 1996
  - Alexandra - Arrigo Cappelletti, Terras Do Risco, Amiata Records, Florence 2001
  - Alon Michael, Israel Edelson, Meditations of the Heart Vol. I, Amiata Records, Florence 1998
  - Amelia Cuni, Werner Durand, Ashtayama, Amiata Records, Florence 1999
  - Andrea Ceccomori & Antonio Rossi, The Celestine Suite, Amiata Records, Florence 1998
  - Andrea Donati, Ape Regina, Amiata Records, Florence 1997
  - Andrea Donati, Le Ciel De Ma Memoire, Amiata Records, Florence 1995
  - Angelo Ricciardi, Song of Enlightenment, Amiata Records, Florence 1994
  - Antonio Breschi, At the edge of the night, Amiata Records, Florence 1994
  - Antonio Breschi, Toscana, Amiata Records, Florence 1996
  - Antonio Infantino, Tara'ntrance, Amiata Records, Florence 2004
  - Antonio Infantino & I Tarantolati, Tarantella Tarantata, Amiata Records, Florence 1996
  - Astor Piazzolla, Thomas Fortmann, Tango Catolico, Amiata Records, Florance 1994
  - Auria Vizia, New Dawn of the Sacred Flames, Amiata Records, Florence 1997
  - Auria Vizia, Music for The Seven Chakras, Amiata Records, Florence 1996
  - Ayub Ogada, Tanguru,
  - Chogyal Namkhai N. Rinpoche Chöd, Cutting Through Dualism, Amiata Records, Florence 1992
  - Chogyal Namkhai Norbu & Matteo Silva, Music for the Dance of Vajra, Amiata Records, 2000
  - Fabio Forte, Asia Blue, Amiata Records, Florence 2001
  - Faraualla, Sind', Amiata Records, Florence 2002
  - Faraualla, Faraualla, Amiata Records, Florence 1999
  - Flavio Piras, The Hands, Amiata Records, Florence 1996
  - Fratelli Mancuso, Cantu, Amiata Records, Florence 2002
  - Fratelli Mancuso, Requiem, Amiata Records, Florence 2008
  - Fratelli Mancuso & Antonio Marangolo, Bella Maria, Amiata Records, Florence 1998
  - Gabin Dabiré, Kontomè, Amiata Records, Florence 1996
  - Gabin Dabiré, Afriki Djamana, Amiata Records, Florence 1994
  - Gaspare Bernardi, L'Arco Terrestre, Amiata Records, Florence 2001
  - Gianfranco Pernaiachi, Abendland, Amiata Records, Florence 1996
  - Hans Otte, Aquarian Music, Amiata Records, Florence 1994
  - Igor Koshkendey, Music From Tuva, Amiata Records, Florence 1997
  - In a Split Second, It Happens, Amiata Records, Florence 1997
  - Krishna Bhatt Kirwani, Music from India, Amiata Records, Florence 1995
  - La Famille Dembelè, Aira Yo, La Dance Des Jeunes Griots, Amiata Records, Florence 1996
  - Marino De Rosas, Meridies, Amiata Records, Florence 1999
  - Mark Kostabi, Songs for Sumera, Amiata Records, Florence 2002
  - Michael Vetter, Nocturne, Amiata Records, Florence 1993
  - Michael Vetter, Ancient Voices, Amiata Records, Florence 1992
  - Neji, Sat, Amiata Records, Florence 1996
  - Nouthong Phimvilayphone, Visions of the Orient: Music from Laos, Amiata Records, Florence 1995
  - Paolo Giaro Ensemble, Urbino, Amiata Records, Florence 1998
  - Paolo Giaro, Krishna Bhatt, D. Gosh, Dancing In the Light of the Full Moon, Amiata Records, Florence 19096
  - Paul Badura-Skoda, Schubert: The trout In the mirror of time, Amiata Records, Florence 1998
  - Quartetto Bernini, J.S. BACH: L'Arte Della Fuga, Amiata Records, Florence 2001
  - Radha, Radha, Amiata Records, Florence 2001
  - Riccardo Fassi, In The Flow, Amiata Records, Florence 1993
  - Roberto Laneri, Memories of the rain forest, Florence 1993
  - Sainkho Namtchylak, Naked Spirit, Amiata Records, Florence 1998
  - Sangeeta Bandyopadhyay/Vincenzo Mingiardi, Sangita, Amiata Records, Florence 2004
  - Savio Riccardi, La Venere Di Willendorf, Amiata Records, Florence 1999
  - S. Reich, A. Part, L. Einaudi, H. Otte, H. M. Gorecki, New Music Masters, Amiata Records, Florence 1996
  - Surabhi Dreams of Sea & Sky, Amiata Records, Florence 1996
  - Synaulia, The Music of Ancient Rome Vol. I, Amiata Records, Florence 1996
  - Synaulia, The Music of Ancient Rome Vol. II, Amiata Records, Florence 2002
  - Terry Riley, The Padova Concert, Amiata Records, Florence 1992
  - The Bauls Of Bengal, A Man of Heart: Music from India, Amiata Records, Florence 1996
  - The Saexophones, From Gesualdo To Sting, Amiata Records, Florence 1996
  - Tibetan Monks/Sera Jé Monastery Tibet, Sera Jé, Amiata Records, Florence 1998
  - Various Artists, Cantos a Kiterra, Amiata Records, Florence 1999
  - Ustad Nishat Khan, Meeting Of Angels, Amiata Records, Florence 2003
  - Ustad Nishat Khan, Raga KhanAmiata Records, Florence 1997
  - Whisky Trail, Chaosmos, Amiata Records, Florence 2006
  - Diana Garden, La Dolce Vita, Amiata Records, Florence 2003
  - Diana Garden, Tribe, Amiata Records, Florence 2002
  - Various Artists, African Angels, Amiata Records, Florence 1997
  - Various Artists, Casa Italia, Amiata Records, Florence 2005
  - Various Artists, Celtic Angels, Amiata Records, Florence 1997
  - Various Artists, Colors, Amiata Records, Florence 1998
  - Various Artists, Magnificat - Music for the Jubilee 2000, Amiata Records, Florence 2000
  - Various Artists, Mediterranean Blue, Amiata Records, Florence 2003
  - Various Artists, Morocco - Sounds from the ancient land, Amiata Records, Florence 1998
  - Various Artists, Premio Città Di Recanati Vol.I, Amiata Records, Florence 2001
  - Various Artists, Premio Città Di Recanati Vol.II, Amiata Records, Florence 2002
  - Various Artists, Sacred Planet, Amiata Records, Florence 1998
  - Various Artists, Viva Cuba Libre, Amiata Records, Florence 2000
  - Various Artists, Voices of Africa, Amiata Records, Amiata Records, Florence 1997
  - Various Artists, Winds & Strings of Africa, Amiata Records, Florence 1997
  - Various Artists, Drums of Africa, Amiata Records, Florence 1997

== Projects ==
Fairy Tales of the World is a collection of twelve CDs containing fairytales from countries on five continents, each read by an actor and set to music from the place where it originated. Each CD is inserted in an illustrated book with the full text of the fairy tale.

== Achievements ==
- Winner of a Naird Award (USA) as Best Independent Record Label,
- Nominated to the Grammy Awards (USA) twice,
- Production of “Magnificat”, an album ordered by the Vatican for “The Jubilee 2000”, with the collaboration of Ennio Morricone, José Carreras, and Montserrat Caballé,
- Production of the work (15 CDs), “World music”, for newspapers such as “L'espresso” and “la Repubblica”,
- Production of the Encyclopedia “Musiche del Mondo”, 65 volumes published by RCS Fabbri Editori,
- Production and release of Synaulia, Music from Ancient Rome Vol. I. and II.,
- Synchronization of tracks for movies such as The Gladiator (2000 film) by Ridley Scott, The Talented Mr. Ripley (film) by Anthony Minghella, and The Village (2004 film),
- Synchronization of tracks for award-winning documentaries,
- Synchronization of tracks for TV advertisements - e.g. Nissan, Carling, California DC.).
