= Alfio Fazio =

Italian composer of contemporary music

Alfio Fazio (born October 27, 1959) is an Italian composer of contemporary music.

Fazio was born in Genova and graduated in classical guitar and composition at Milan Academy of Music. He has studied guitar with Anselmo Bersano and composition in Rome with Paolo Arcà and in Milan with Niccolò Castiglioni, attending at the same time the Faculty of Arts in Genova. He is one of the founders of the Young Philharmonic Orchestra of Genova and was member of its artistic committee up to 1990.

He has been active since the early 1980s as a guitarist and composer and has written works for different ensembles, varying from solo instruments to orchestra, including Iperione, for chamber orchestra (dedicated to Niccolò Castiglioni), Wen, for chamber ensemble (mentioned at the Camillo Togni competition in 1992) and L'albero solitario (1989), for six percussionists and piano (written for I Percussionisti di Genova). His more recent works include Corale figurato for two guitars and This is the passing of all shining things (by E. E. Cummings), for violin, cello and percussion.

His interest in electronic and computer music dates back to 1983, year in which he follows the seminar organized by the Biennale di Venezia with Alvise Vidolin, Marco Stroppa and Giuseppe di Giugno. Interested in computer programming since 1991, he has worked on both PC and Mac platforms developing software using languages such as MAX, Visual Basic, Pascal, C and C++. His compositional environment PRIE won the IMEB 4th International Musical Software Competition at Bourges in 1999.
