= Synaulia =

Synaulia is a team of musicians, archeologists, paleontologists and choreographers dedicated to the application of their historical research to ancient music and dance, in particular to the ancient Etruscan and Roman periods.

== History ==
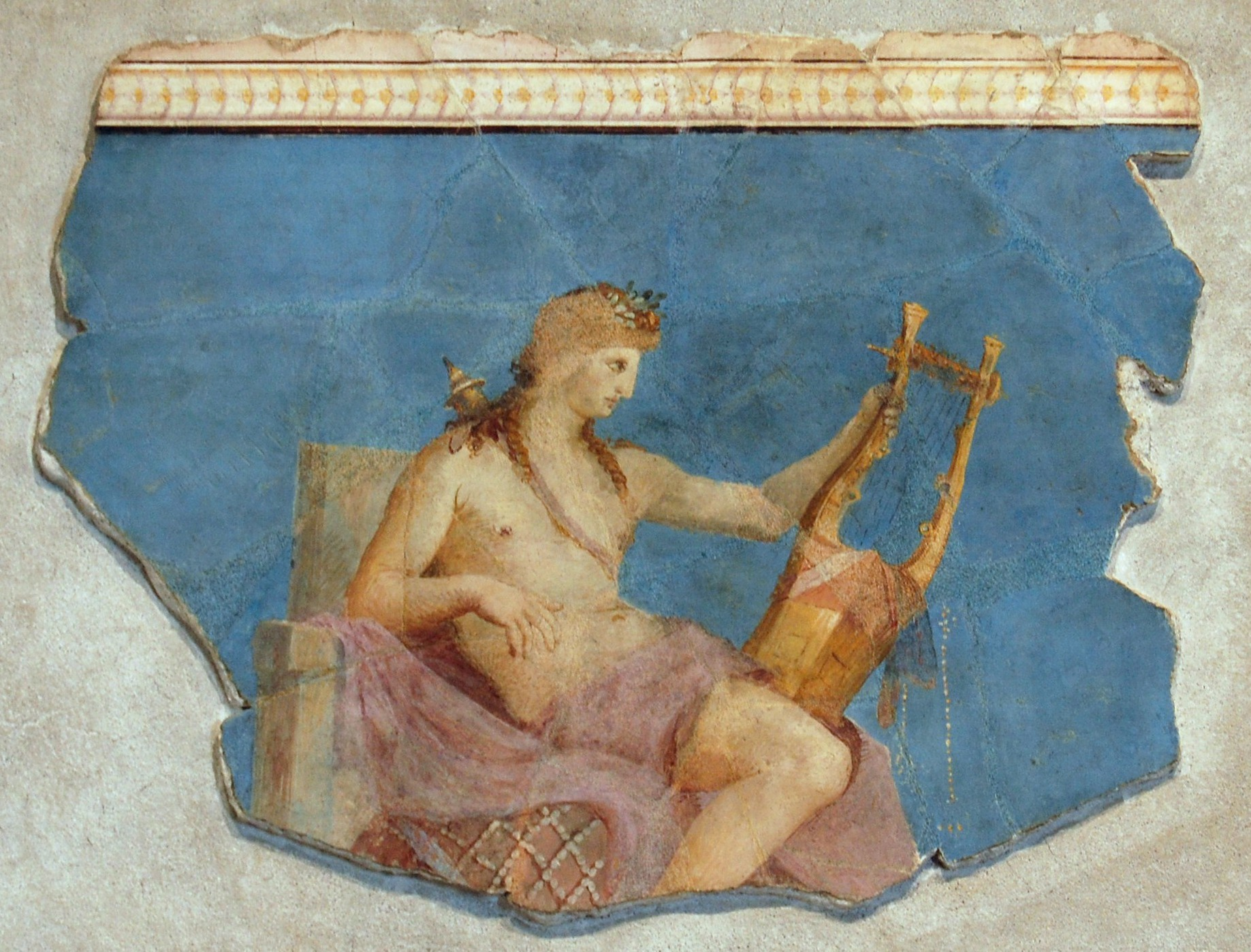
Apollo citaredo. Painted plasterwork, Roman work from the Augustan era. From the Scalae Caci on Palatinum, Rome

The name comes from the Ancient Greek "συναυλία" (sunaulía), which in ancient Rome referred to a group of instruments consisting mainly of wind instruments.

The group was founded and at first sponsored by the Rijksmuseum van Oudheden in Leiden, Netherlands in 1995 by Italian paleorganologist Walter Maioli and choreographer and anthropologist Natalie Van Ravenstein.

In the beginning the Synaulia's task was mainly educational: the reconstruction of ancient musical instruments for the Dutch archeological center, Archeon. Later the scope was widened to include a more profound study into Italy's music and dance focusing primarily on ancient Rome. The fruits of Synaulia's intensive study were used as material for films, serials and documentaries about ancient Rome (among them Gladiator by Ridley Scott and the television series Rome), the use of the instruments for scholastic purposes, as well as in the publication of numerous articles on the subject.

== The archeological-musical research work ==
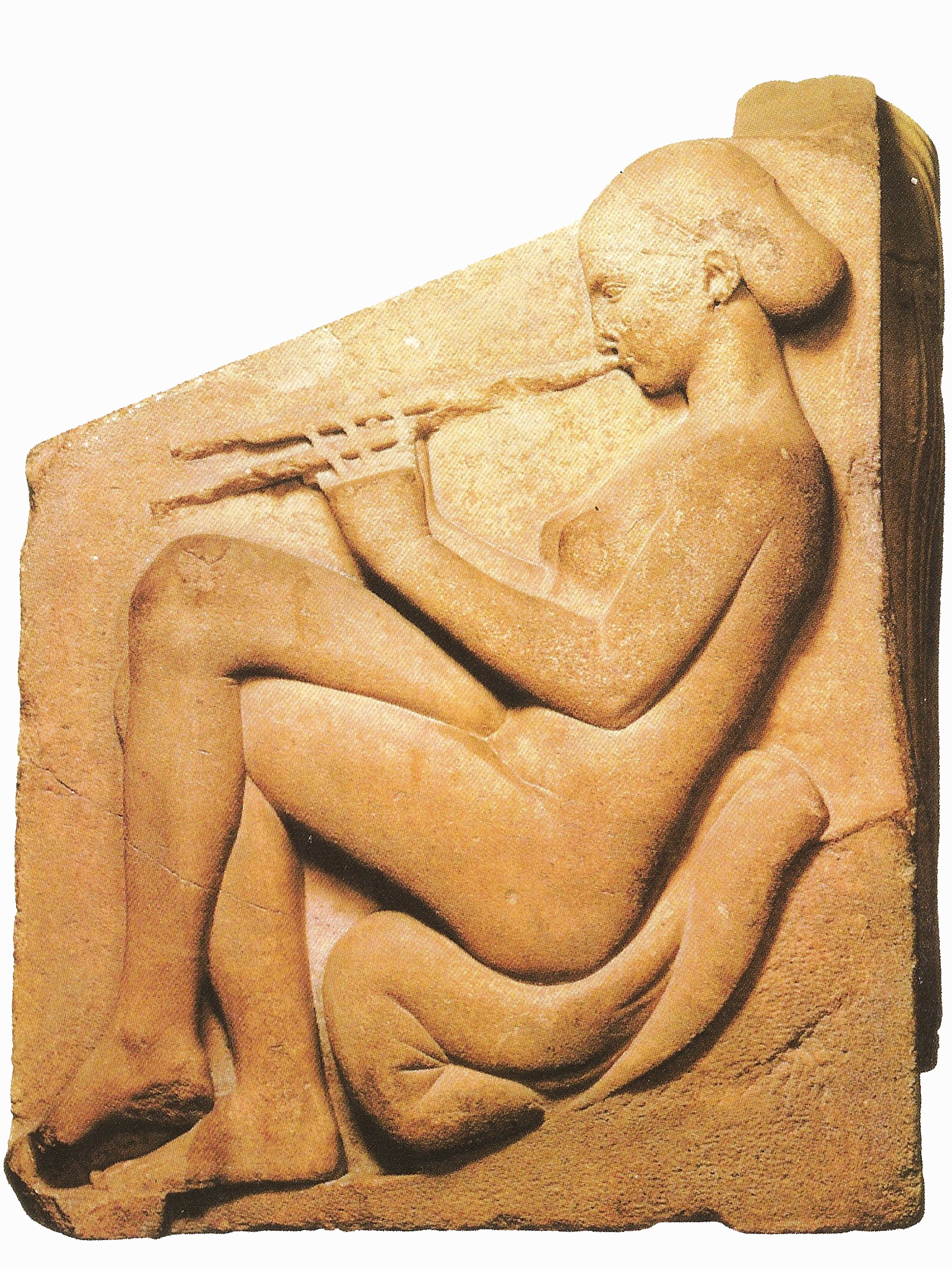
Ludovisi Throne: Woman playing aulòs or double pipes (5th century BC, Rome, National Roman Museum)

In the absence of a system of musical notation for the period in question, the reconstruction and study of ancient musical expression was based on comparative studies of iconography, textual analysis, social studies and customs, also drawing from paleorganology, ethnomusicology, archeology and historiography.

The richness of the iconographic documentation, the abundance of tested theories and numerous literary connections facilitated the study and reproduction of a wide range of antique musical instruments, helping to determine, among other points of interest, their melodic and harmonic possibilities and acoustic quality.

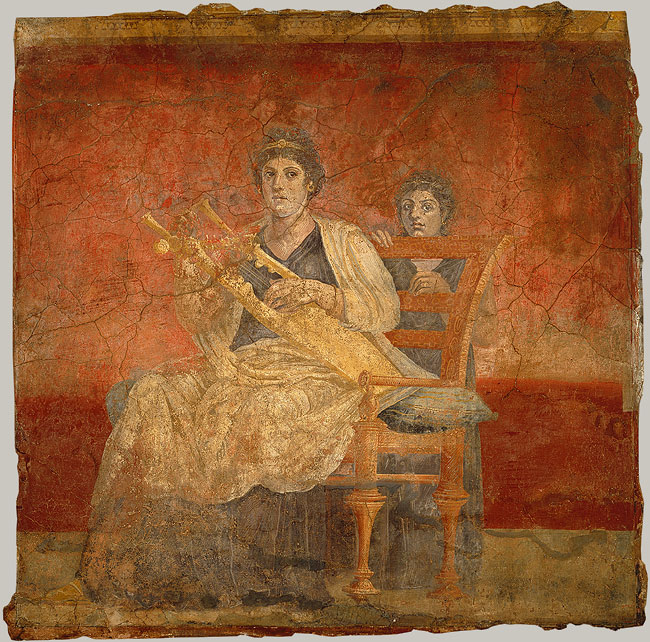
Fresco representing a woman playing the “cithara”. H Room of the P. Fannius Synistor Boscoreale, around 40–30 AD.

Armed with this historical information, the group's research was then subdivided into several main research branches. The first branch was dedicated to wind instruments. The research led to the reconstruction of instruments such as syrinx, fistulae, tibiae, cornu, tuba, bucina, iynx, and rhombus. The second branch dealt with string instruments: among others the lyra, cithara, sambuca, cordae and pandura were reconstructed.

The Greeks and Romans did not invent string instruments, but rather improved and created variations on the existing ones. The first mentions of antique string instruments such as zithers, lyres and harps were documented in the area from the Nile to Mesopotamia around 3000 BC. The lyre in particular had an essential role in Greek-Roman life. The Greek lyre was a strongly symbolic instrument made of tortoise shell (representing the intermediate life between Sky and Earth), a piece of stretched leather (a symbol of sacrifice) and two horns to which the cords were affixed (representing the celestial Bull). This instrument represented a symbolic altar, uniting Sky with Earth. In many representations other instruments often accompany the string instruments. The most common duo is the lyrae et citarae drawn together by the Pan flute. Other frequently represented combinations are stringed instruments and tibiae, double instruments with reed and double pipes with the tympanum and other percussion instruments. The third branch was dedicated to percussion, and work was undertaken to reconstruct the tympanum, cymbal, scabillum, sistrum, rasum and other celebrated instruments from the late imperial period, the so-called “Golden Age” (aurea aetas).

== Scientific collaborations ==
Other collaborators as consultants and collaborators of the project are Nathalie van Ravenstein, Luce Maioli, Ivan Gibellini, Anna Maria Liberati (Museo della Civiltà Romana, Maurizio Pellegrini (Museo Nazionale Etrusco di Villa Giulia, Rome) Romolo Staccioli e Maria Grazia Iodice (Università La Sapienza, Rome), Paola Elisabetta Simeoni (Museo Nazionale delle Arti e Tradizioni Popolari), Maria Grazia Siliato, Marcus Junkelmann Ratzennhofen (Germany), Carlo Merlo (Clesis, Rome), Magdi Kenawy (Accademia d’Egitto, Rome), Werner Hilgers (Rheinisches Landesmuseum Bonn, Germany), il H.P. Kuhnen (Rheinisches Landesmuseum, Trier Germany), Maria Paola Guidobaldi (Sovrintendenza di Pompei), Febo Guizzi (Milan), Gerard Ijzereef (Amsterdam) e Fabrizio Felice Ridolfi (Rome).

== Discography ==
- Synaulia, Music of Ancient Rome, Vol. I – Wind Instruments – Amiata Records ARNR 1396, Florence, 1996
- Synaulia, Music of Ancient Rome, Vol. II – String instruments – Amiata Records, ARNR 0302, Rome, 2002

== Filmography ==
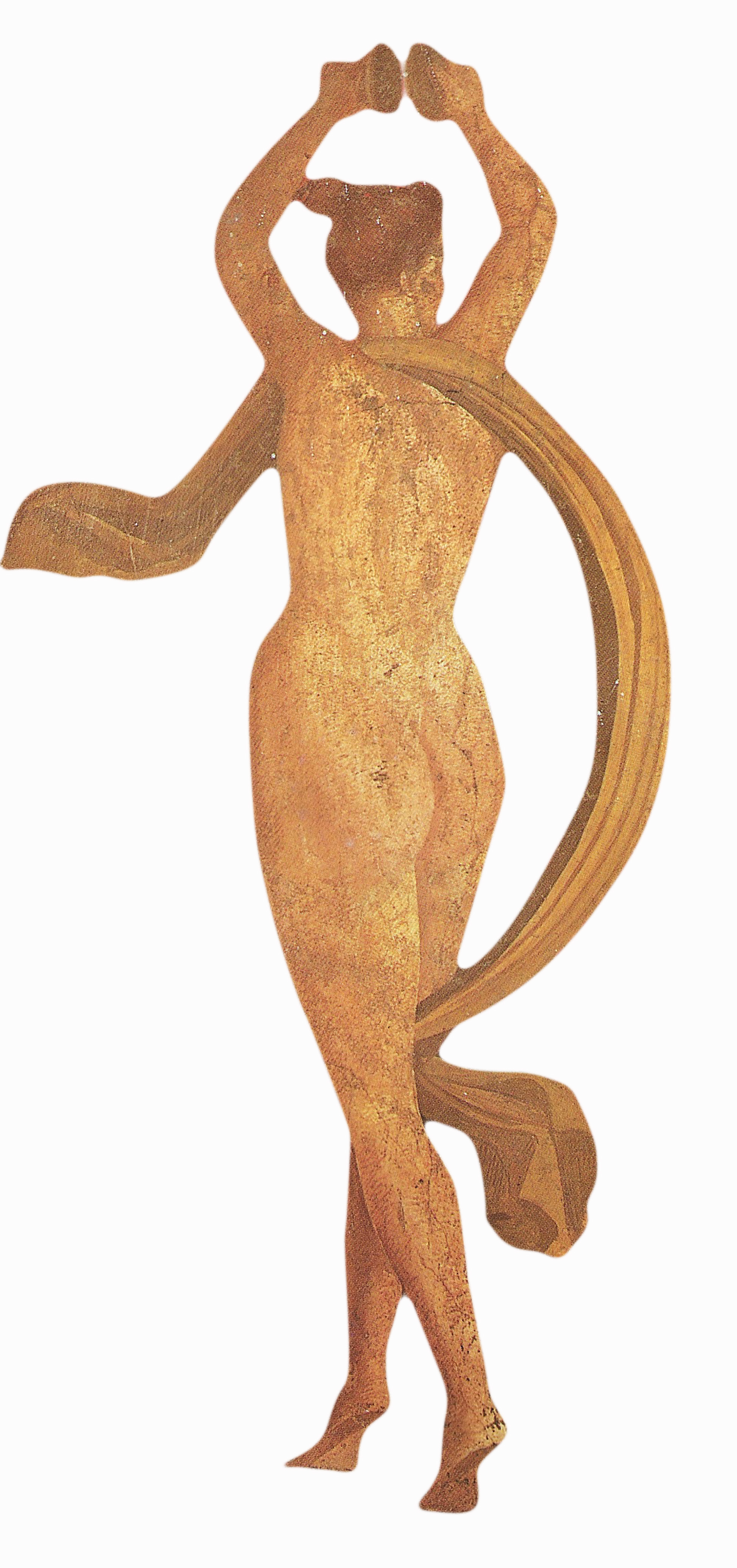
Female cymbal player. Particular fresco, Villa dei Misteri, 60 AD. ca. Pompei

Compositions and variations of Synaulia, Music of Ancient Rome vol. I and vol. II were used in soundtracks of documentaries, games, and films, like:

- A Midsummer Night's Dream by Michael Hoffman, 1999
- Gladiator by Ridley Scott, 2000
- Carvilius – Un enigma dall’antica Roma, Discovery Channel, 2002
- The Village by Night Shyamalan, 2004
- Lo sport tra Grecia ed Etruria, 2004
- Empire, TV series produced by Touchstone Television/Abc, 2005
- Rome, TV series produced by BBC-HBO, 2005–2007
- Alexander the Great, Beyond the Movie, National Geographic, 2006
- Storia del teatro Italiano by Giorgio Albertazzi and Dario Fo, Rai 2, Rai trade, 2006
- La donna si fa bella, moda costume e bellezza nell’Italia antica, 2006
- The Nativity Story, New Line Cinema, 2006
- Demetra e il Mito, by Maurizio Pellegrini and Ebe Giovannini, 2007
- La via Clodia, by Ebe Giovannini, 2007
- Storia del vino nell’età antica, Ministry of Cultural Activities and Heritage, Supervision for Archeological Heritage of the Southern Etruria, 2008
- Sid Meier's Civilization VI, as main and Ambient themes of The Roman Empire.

== Bibliography ==
- Bonanni, Filippo (1964). Antique Musical Instruments and their Players, Dover Publications reprint of the 1723 work, Gabinetto armonico
- Boethius, Anicius Manlius Severinus. De institutione musica.(English edition as Fundamentals of Music. New Haven: Yale University Press, 1989.)
- Grout, Donald J., and Claude V. Palisca (1996). A History of Western Music, New York: W.W. Norton.
- Pierce, John R (1983), The Science of Musical Sound, New York: Scientific American Books.
- Scott, J. E. (1957). 'Roman Music' in The New Oxford History of Music, vol.1: 'Ancient and Oriental Music,' Oxford: Oxford University Press.
- Smith, William (1874). A Dictionary of Greek and Roman Antiquities. New York: Harper.
- Suetonius. Nero, xli, liv.
- Ulrich, Homer, and Paul Pisk (1963). A History of Music and Musical Style. New York: Harcourt Brace Jovanoich.
- Walter, Don C (1969) Me and Music in Western Culture, New York: Appleton-Century-Crofts.
- Williams, C. F. (1903). The Story of the Organ. New York: Charles Scribner & Sons.
