= Antonio Infantino (musician) =

Italian musician and poet (1944–2018)

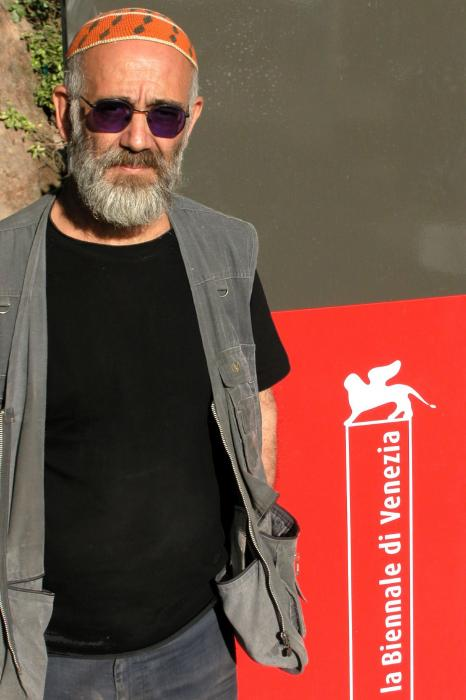
- Infantino at the Venice Biennale

Background information
- Born: 6 April 1944; Sabaudia, Italy
- Died: 30 January 2018 (aged 73) Florence, Italy
- Genres: Italian folk, world, experimental
- Occupations: Musician, songwriter, poet
- Instruments: Vocals, guitar

Antonio Infantino (6 April 1944 – 30 January 2018) was an Italian musician and poet, known for his work with the Tarantolati di Tricarico. His music drew on the folk traditions of southern Italy, particularly the rhythms of the tarantella, which he developed into original compositions.

== Life and career ==
Infantino was born in Sabaudia and grew up in Tricarico, in Basilicata, where his parents came from. He later settled in Florence, studied architecture at the university. In 1966 he began performing at Rome's Folkstudio and Milan's Nebbia Club.

His poetry collection I denti cariati e la patria appeared with an introduction by Fernanda Pivano. His first album, Ho la criniera da leone (perciò attenzione), was produced by Nanni Ricordi. He also worked with Dario Fo on Ci ragiono e canto 2, composing and performing "Avola" and "Povera gente" with Enzo Del Re.

Infantino performing

In the mid-1970s he brought together musicians from Tricarico. The ensemble recorded I Tarantolati in 1975 under the name Antonio Infantino e il Gruppo di Tricarico, followed by La morte bianca – Tarantata dell'Italsider in 1976. These recordings combined local musical traditions with songs about migration, industrial labour and social inequality.

His later collaborations included 99 Posse, with whom he revisited "La gatta mammona" in 1997, and Eraldo Bernocchi, who contributed electronic music to Tara'n Trance. Infantino died at his home in Florence on 30 January 2018.

== Music ==
Infantino's performances centred on voice, guitar and percussion. The Tarantolati used traditional tarantella rhythms as the basis for new songs. Their live music featured repeated rhythmic and melodic patterns, tambourines and the chitarra battente.

Infantino connected the imagery of tarantism with contemporary experiences of alienation and exploitation. His work also incorporated Brazilian musical influences and, in later recordings, electronic music.

== Selected recordings ==
- Ho la criniera da leone (perciò attenzione)
- I Tarantolati
- La morte bianca – Tarantata dell'Italsider
- Tarantella Tarantata
- Tara'n Trance
