= Fratelli Mancuso =

The Fratelli Mancuso, the brothers Enzo and Lorenzo Mancuso, are musicians who were born in Sutera in the province of Caltanissetta, Sicily. They moved to London in the 1970s and have been based in Città della Pieve, Umbria since 1981.

They sing in Sicilian, accompanying themselves of a number of acoustic instruments. Their music is in a modern, distinctly Sicilian style which incorporates a range of traditional elements.
