= Thomas Fortmann =

Swiss composer (born 1951)

Thomas Fortmann (born 1951) is a Swiss composer and founder of the "Accademia Amiata, Toscana delle Culture", and "ClaZZ Festival".

== Youth and pop career ==
Born in Gerzensee Fortmann, also known as Tommy Fortmann, son of the Swiss soprano Greta Saar and the entrepreneur Rudolf Fortmann, was born in Gerzensee in the canton of Bern as the first of two children. At 17, he wrote his first pop/rock hit, which was released in 27 countries. In collaboration with the producer Dieter Dierks, over 100 of his songs were released by United Artists, CBS, EMI, Decca-Telefunken, Ariola, Phonogram, Hansa and others.During this time he worked with Jürgen Drews, Su Kramer, Alexis Korner, Toni Vescoli, Daniela Davoli etc. The conclusion of his rock/pop career made the music for the musical Tell, in which Udo Lindenberg played the leading role.

== Contemporary music career ==
At the age of 26 he turned to the study of classical music. He then composed mainly chamber works, but also two symphonies, an oratorio, concertos, songs and several music stage works with commissions and scholarships from the Swiss Federal Office for Cultural Affairs, Zurich Opera House etc

Constant development and the search for the appropriate form corresponding to the content of a new work allow him to develop original ideas; and through his personality, heterogeneous and often even contradictory modernist impulses can be playfully combined into a unity. Construction and vitality, logic and sensual effect are by no means mutually exclusive in his compositions.

In the mid-1980s, Fortmann moved with his family to Tuscany, where he founded the Accademia Amiata in addition to his compositional activities with musicians from the provinces of Grosseto and Siena, and directed the "Toscana delle Culture" festival for several years. In 2016, he founds the international ClaZZ Festival. All works are published by Müller & Schade in Bern.

== Work ==
Duos

- Sonate für Violine & Klavier "A Southern Diary" 16', premiere: Laufenburg, CH, (2009) Cd: Métier
- Sonate für Alt Sax und Klavier, 13', premiere: Wolfsburg, D, Italienisches Kulturinstitut (2006) Cd: Métier
- "Quintcello Sonate" für Violoncello und Klavier16', premiere: Carnegie Hall, New York (2013), Cd: Blue Griffin
- Duo für Violine & Klavier, "Grafeneck Variazioni"
- Duo für Alt Sax & Klavier, "BachCab" 06', premiere: Orbetello Piano Festival, 2015, Cd: Métier
- Konzert für 2 Klaviere & ad.lib Schlagzeug, "Krieger der Nacht", 50' premiere, Salerno Piano Festival
- Sonatina für 2 Saxophone (S&T) "The Goretti Thing" 5' Cd: Métier
- Stücke für Oboe d' amore oder Sopran Sax & Klavier "Aus den Tropen", 11‘

Trios

- "Prolitheus Suite" Klaviertrio (Vl, Vcl, Pno), 30', premiere: College Station, Texas University, USA (2010), CD Métier
- "Con Pepe e Zucchero" Trio für 2 Violinen & Klavier, 16', Interharmony Festival, Arcidosso, I (2016)
- "Schabernack Suite" Trio für Violine, Klarinette & Klavier
- "Grafeneck Konzert", Violine, Perkussionen & Klavier plus Einspielungen, 38‘, premiere: Schloss Grafeneck, D (2015)
- "Elena e Greta" Burlesque für 2 Flöten & Klavier, 7'30'', premiere: Arosa (2016), Radioaufnahme DRS2
- "Ladyboy" Streichtrio (Vl, Vla, Vcl), 13'30'', premiere: Zyklorama, Zürich, CH, (1994), Cd: Divine Art
- "Etude Pytagorienne No.3" Klaviertrio, UA: Centre Culturel Suisse, Paris, Radioaufnahme: RSI
- "Catholic Blues" Trio für 2 Saxophone (A&B) und Klavier, 6'07''. premiere: Europäisches Kulturzentrum Erfurt", Cd: Métier
- "Three Piggies in Clover" Trio für 2 Saxophone (S&A) und Klavier, 4'40'', Cd: Métier

Quartets

- Streichquartett, "Tango Catolico", 20’, premiere: Kulturviertel, Kiel, D, (1993) Cd: Divine Art und Pentaphon
- Saxophonquartett, "Songkran", 4’30’’, premiere: Mozartfestival Rovereto, I, (1995), Cd: Métier
- Saxofonquartett, "A little American Night music", 630’’, premiere: Mozartfestival Rovereto, I, (1995) Cd: Métier
- Saxophonquartett "Pop Oh Kakapitl", 2'45'', premiere: Mozartfestival Rovereto, I, Cd: Métier

Lieder cyclus

- "Requiem für ein ungeborenes Kind", Klar, Vl, Vcl, Pno und mittlerer Stimme, 30‘, premiere: Musikakademie Basel, CH, (1990) Cd: Divine Art und Pentaphon
- "Geschichten" Klaviertrio (Vl, Vcl, Pno) und hohe Stimme
- "Hoffmannsthal Verse", Klaviertrio (Vl, Vcl, Pno) und hohe Stimme
- "Schuberts Winterreise" Streichquartett mit Bariton, 60‘, premiere: Basel-Riehen, CH (2012)
- "Der Süsse Ton", Streichquartett mit Bariton, 15‘, UA: Basel-Riehen, CH (2012)
- "Am Ende des Flurs, 4. Stock" für Tenor, Via & Uno, 8', premiere: Laufenburg, CH (2017) Cd: edition.vokalmusik

Ensembles

- "Concertino Gregoriano" Septett für Ob(EH), Cl(bsCI), Fag, Pno, Vl, Vla, Vcl, 15‘, premiere: Interharmony Festival Arcidosso, I (2014)
- "Die Ermordung einer Butterblume" für Flöte und Streichquintett (ad.lib. mit Pantomime od. Tänzer), premiere: ClaZZ Festival, I (2017)
- "Burlesque" für Flöte, Streichquintett und Klavier 7'30'' premiere: Gaia Festival, CH (2017)
- "Andante for a Somersault" für Flöte, Streichquintett und Klavier 4' premiere: Gaia Festival, CH (2017)
- "Rag'n Blue" für Violine, Alt Sax, Schlagzeug, Klavier, Akkordeon & Bass
- "Arenal Fantasy" für Violine, Klarinette, Perkussionen, Klavier & Akkordeon, 30‘
- "Suite für Leontine" für Fl, Kl, Pno, Vl, Vcl, KB
- "Pinocchio Suite no.2" für 2Trp, Hrn, Pos, Tub, 15‘

Orchestral pieces

- Symphonie no.1 "Pythagorian", SATB - Chor ad lib. - 2F l(Pic), Ob, EH, Kl, Bs.Kl, S.Sax, B.Sax, 2Fg, 2Hrn, 2Trp, 2Pos, Pkn, Perk, Pno/Cel, Vl1&2, Vla, Vcl, KB, 35‘, premiere: Toscana delle Culture, Orbetello, I,
- Symphonie no.2 "Etruria", 2.1(EH).1.(BKlar).2 - SSax.BSax - 2.2.2.0. - Pk - Perc(2). - Streicher, 35’, premiere: Moores Opera House, Houston USA, Cd:Métier
- "Oratorio Francescano", Solist & Chor (5-stimmig), Fl, Ob, Kl, aS, Fg, Pkn/Perk, Org, Vl1, Vl2, Vla, Vcl, KB, abendfüllend, (premiere ancient version: Magadino, CH 1982) premiere new Version: Zürich-Wollishofen, 2016
- "Arenal Concierto" -2Fl(Pic), 2Ob(EH), 2Kl(Bs.Kl), Sax, 2Fg, 2Trp, 2Hrn, Mba, Sch.zg, Pno, Vl1&2, Vla, Vcl, KB, 20‘

Theatre music

- "Schabernackoper", 3 schauspielende Musiker (Vl, Kl, Pno), abendfüllend
- "Collodis Pinocchio", 5 Musiker (Vl, 2Sax, Schlzg, Pno) & 6 singende Schauspieler/innen, abendfüllend, UA: Nuithonie, Fribourg, CH, (2005) Cd:Klick Records
- "Vaudeville für Leontine", Fl, Kl, Schlzg/Perk, Pno, Vl, Vcl, Bs, Mezzosoprano, Tenor, Bariton, abendfüllend, UA: Murten Classics, CH, (2017)
- "Pinocchio" Musical, Fl(Pic), Ob, EH, Kl, Bs.Kl, Sax(S&A), Fg, Hrn, 2Trp, Pos, Bs.Pos(od.Tb), Pkn, Perk, Pno, KB, Sänger & Chor, abendfüllend, premiere: Opernhaus Zürich, CH, 1989, Vergriffen und nur auf Anfrage erhältlich
- "Tell Musical", 2el.Gtr, Pno, Schlzg, el.Bs, Orchester, Sänger, Chor & Ballett, abendfüllend, premiere: Zürich, CH, 1977 LP: Telefunken-DECCA.
