= Barry Manilow discography =

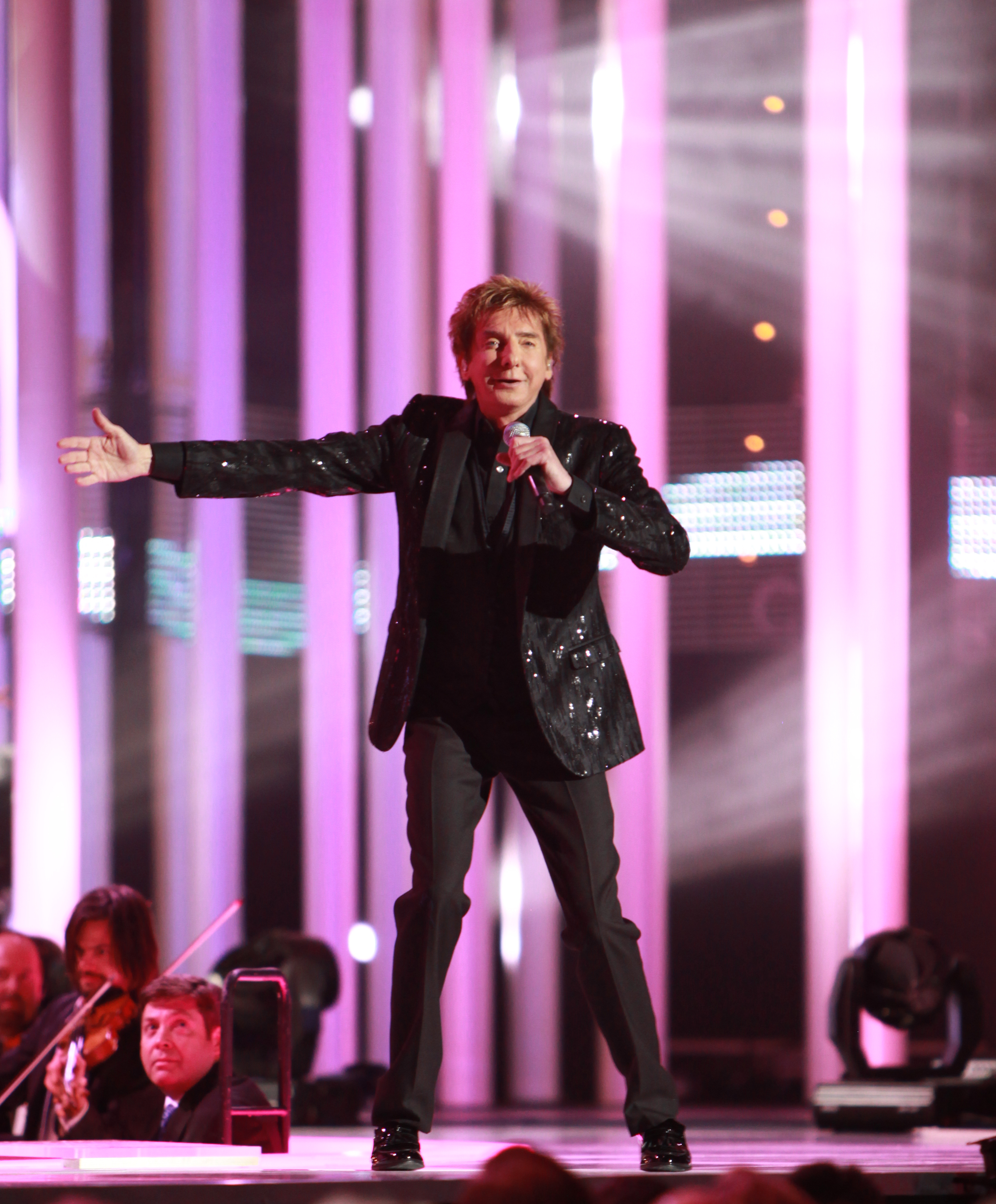
- Barry Manilow at the Nobel Peace Prize Concert 2010
- Studio albums: 33
- Soundtrack albums: 4
- Live albums: 6
- Compilation albums: 17
- Singles: 57

Barry Manilow is an American singer–songwriter, musician, arranger, producer, and conductor. His discography consists of 33 studio albums, 6 live albums, 17 compilation albums, and 57 singles (13 #1's). Signed to his first recording contract in 1969 by Tony Orlando, after writing, singing, and recording hit jingles for business corporations in the mid and late 1960s, Manilow released his first solo album, Barry Manilow, in 1973. He is best known for such recordings as "Mandy", "Can't Smile Without You", and "Copacabana (At the Copa)". To date, he has sold more than 85 million records worldwide, making him one of the best selling recording artists of all time.

== Albums ==
=== Studio albums ===
| Year | Album details | Chart positions | | | Sales | Certifications (sales thresholds) |
| Year | Album details | US | AUS | UK | Sales | Certifications (sales thresholds) |
|---|---|---|---|---|---|---|
| 1973 | Barry Manilow: Released: July 1973; Label: Bell / Arista (Re-release) | 28 | — | — | | US: Gold |
| 1974 | Barry Manilow II: Released: October 1974; Label: Bell / Arista (Re-release) | 9 | 66 | — | | US: Platinum |
| 1975 | Tryin' to Get the Feeling: Released: October 1975; Label: Arista | 5 | 59 | — | | US: 2× Platinum |
| 1976 | This One's for You: Released: August 1976; Label: Arista | 6 | — | — | | US: 2× Platinum |
| 1978 | Even Now: Released: February 1978; Label: Arista | 3 | 8 | 12 | | US: 3× Platinum; UK: Silver |
| 1979 | One Voice: Released: September 25, 1979; Label: Arista | 9 | 64 | 18 | | US: 2× Platinum; UK: Gold |
| 1980 | Barry: Released: November 19, 1980; Label: Arista | 15 | 65 | 5 | | US: Platinum; UK: Platinum |
| 1981 | If I Should Love Again: Released: September 1981; Label: Arista | 14 | 85 | 5 | | US: Gold; UK: Platinum |
| 1982 | Here Comes the Night: Released: November 1982; Label: Arista | 32 | 19 | 7 | | US: Gold |
| 1984 | 2:00 AM Paradise Cafe: Released: November 15, 1984; Label: Arista | 28 | 100 | 28 | | US: Gold; UK: Silver |
| 1985 | Manilow: Released: 1985; Label: RCA | 42 | — | 40 | | |
| 1987 | Swing Street: Released: 1987; Label: Arista | 70 | — | 81 | | |
| 1989 | Barry Manilow: Released: May 2, 1989; Label: Arista | 64 | — | — | | UK: Silver |
| 1990 | Because It's Christmas: Release: September 25, 1990; Label: Arista | 40 | — | — | | US: Platinum |
| 1991 | Showstoppers: Released: September 24, 1991; Label: Arista | 68 | — | 53 | | |
| 1994 | Singin' with the Big Bands: Released: October 11, 1994; Label: Arista | 59 | — | 54 | | US: Gold |
| 1996 | Summer of '78: Released: November 19, 1996; Label: Arista | 82 | — | 66 | | |
| 1998 | Manilow Sings Sinatra: Released: November 10, 1998; Label: Arista | 122 | — | 72 | | |
| 2001 | Here at the Mayflower: Released: November 13, 2001; Label: Concord | 90 | — | 18 | | |
| 2002 | A Christmas Gift of Love: Released: November 12, 2002; Label: Concord Jazz / Columbia | 55 | — | — | | US: Gold |
| 2004 | Scores: Released: September 28, 2004; Label: Concord | 47 | — | — | | |
| 2006 | The Greatest Songs of the Fifties: Released: January 31, 2006; Label: Arista | 1 | 36 | 12 | US: 1,100,000 | US: Platinum; UK: Gold |
| 2006 | The Greatest Songs of the Sixties: Released: October 31, 2006; Label: Arista | 2 | — | 56 | US: 633,000 | US: Gold; UK: Gold |
| 2007 | The Greatest Songs of the Seventies: Released: September 18, 2007; Label: Arista | 4 | — | 27 | | UK: Silver |
| 2007 | In the Swing of Christmas: Released: November 1, 2007; Label: Arista / Hallmark | 127 | — | — | | US: Gold |
| 2008 | The Greatest Songs of the Eighties: Released: November 24, 2008; Label: Arista | 14 | — | 22 | | |
| 2010 | The Greatest Love Songs of All Time: Released: January 26, 2010; Label: Arista | 5 | — | 26 | | |
| 2011 | 15 Minutes: Released: June 14, 2011; Label: Stiletto Entertainment / Fontana (US) Rhino (UK) | 7 | — | 20 | | |
| 2014 | Night Songs: Released: March 25, 2014; Label: Stiletto Entertainment | 8 | — | — | | |
| 2014 | My Dream Duets: Released: October 28, 2014; Label: Verve Music UMG | 4 | — | 28 | | |
| 2017 | This Is My Town: Songs of New York: Released: April 21, 2017; Label: Verve Music UMG | 12 | — | 26 | | |
| 2020 | Night Songs II: Released: February 14, 2020; Label: Stiletto Entertainment | 32 | — | — | | |
| 2026 | What a Time: Released: June 5, 2026; Label: Stiletto Entertainment | — | — | 34 | | |
"—" denotes releases that did not chart.

=== Live albums ===
| Year | Album details | Chart positions | | | Certifications (sales thresholds) |
| Year | Album details | US | AUS | UK | Certifications (sales thresholds) |
|---|---|---|---|---|---|
| 1977 | Barry Manilow Live: Released: May 1977; Label: Arista; Format: LP, CD, Deluxe Edition expanded CD | 1 | 25 | — | US: 3× Platinum |
| 1982 | Barry Live in Britain: Released: Label: Arista UK; Format: CD, LP | — | — | 1 | UK: Platinum |
| 1990 | Live on Broadway: Released: April 17, 1990; Label: Arista; Format: CD, LP | 196 | — | 19 | |
| 2004 | 2 Nights Live!: Released: April 6, 2004; Label: Stiletto; Format: CD | 27 | — | — | US: Gold |
| 2012 | Live in London: Released: April 24, 2012; Label: Stilleto Entertainment; Format: DVD, CD | 24 | — | — | |
| 2014 | Live at Paris Las Vegas: Released: 2014; Label: Ingrooves; Format: DVD (no CD) | — | — | — | |
"—" denotes releases that did not chart.

=== Compilation albums ===
| Year | Album details | Chart positions | | | Certifications (sales thresholds) |
| Year | Album details | US | AUS | UK | Certifications (sales thresholds) |
|---|---|---|---|---|---|
| 1978 | Greatest Hits: Released: November 1978; Label: Arista; Format: | 7 | 26 | 3 | US: 3× Platinum |
| 1983 | Greatest Hits Vol. II: Released: December 1983; Label: Arista; Format: | 30 | — | 10 | US: Platinum |
| 1985 | The Manilow Collection / 20 Classic Hits: Released: 1985; Label: Arista; Format: | 100 | — | — | US: Gold |
| 1989 | Greatest Hits Volume I: Released: 1989; Label: Arista; Format: | — | — | — | US: Platinum |
| 1989 | Greatest Hits Volume II: Released: 1989; Label: Arista; Format: | — | — | — | US: Platinum |
| 1989 | Greatest Hits Volume III: Released: 1989; Label: Arista; Format: | — | — | — | |
| 1990 | The Songs 1975–1990: Released: 1990; Label: Format: | — | — | 13 | UK: Silver |
| 1992 | The Complete Collection and Then Some...: Released: November 10, 1992; Label: Arista; Format: | 182 | — | — | US: Gold |
| 1993 | Hidden Treasures: Released: 1993; Label: Arista; Format: | — | — | 36 | |
| 1993 | Greatest Hits: The Platinum Collection: Released: 1993; Label: Arista; Format: | — | 6 | 37 | AUS: Platinum; UK: Silver |
| 2002 | Ultimate Manilow: Released: February 5, 2002; Label: Arista; Format: | 3 | 96 | 8 | US: 2× Platinum; UK: Platinum |
| 2005 | The Essential Barry Manilow: Released: April 26, 2005; Label: Legacy Recordings; Format: | — | — | — | |
| 2005 | The Very Best of Barry Manilow: Released: Label: Hallmark/Sony BMG; Format: | — | — | — | |
| 2008 | Beautiful Ballads & Love Songs: Released: January 15, 2008; Label: Arista; Format: | — | — | — | |
| 2010 | The Essential Barry Manilow: Limited Edition 3.0: Released: 2010; Label: Legacy; Format: | — | — | — | |
| 2010 | Playlist: The Very Best of Barry Manilow: Released: 2010; Label: Sony Legacy; Format: CD, download | — | — | — | |
| 2011 | Duets: Released: 2011; Label: Sony Legacy; Format: CD, download | — | — | — | |
"—" denotes releases that did not chart.

=== Soundtracks ===
| Year | Album details |
|---|---|
| 1978 | Foul Play: Released: July 1978; Label: Arista; Format: LP, CS, CD |
| 1985 | Copacabana: Released: December 1985; Label: RCA; Format: LP |
| 1994 | Thumbelina: Released: February 28, 1994; Label: SBK; Format: CD, CS |
| 1995 | The Pebble and the Penguin: Released: April 11, 1995; Label: Rhino; Format: CD, CS |

== Singles ==
List of singles, with selected chart positions
| Year | Title / B-side title | Peak chart positions | | | | | | | | | | | Certifications | Album |
| Year | Title / B-side title | US | US Cash Box | US AC | AUS | CAN | CAN AC | GER | IRE | NZ | SA | UK | Certifications | Album |
|---|---|---|---|---|---|---|---|---|---|---|---|---|---|---|
| 1973 | "Sweetwater Jones" / "One of These Days" | — | — | — | — | — | — | — | — | — | — | — | | Barry Manilow (Original Bell album) |
| 1973 | "Could It Be Magic" (original solo version) / "Cloudburst" | — | — | — | — | — | — | — | — | — | — | — | | Barry Manilow (Original Bell album) |
| 1974 | "Let's Take Some Time to Say Goodbye" / "Seven More Years" (from Barry Manilow) | — | — | — | — | — | — | — | — | — | — | — | | Non-LP track |
| 1974 | "Mandy" / "Something's Comin' Up" | 1 | 1 | 1 | 4 | 1 | 1 | 37 | 6 | 30 | 3 | 11 | US: Gold | Barry Manilow II |
| 1975 | "It's a Miracle" / "One of These Days" (from Barry Manilow) | 12 | 10 | 1 | 84 | 1 | 2 | — | — | — | — | — | | Barry Manilow II |
| 1975 | "Could It Be Magic" (remixed version) / "I Am Your Child" | 6 | 7 | 4 | 70 | 3 | 3 | — | 18 | — | — | 25 | | Barry Manilow I (Arista reissue) |
| 1975 | "I Write the Songs" / "A Nice Boy Like Me" | 1 | 1 | 1 | 5 | 3 | 2 | — | 11 | 13 | 5 | — | US: Gold | Tryin' to Get the Feeling |
| 1976 | "Tryin' to Get the Feeling Again" / "Beautiful Music" | 10 | 10 | 1 | — | 13 | 1 | — | — | — | — | — | | Tryin' to Get the Feeling |
| 1976 | "This One's for You" / "Riders to the Stars" | 29 | 21 | 1 | — | 28 | 1 | — | — | — | — | — | | This One's for You |
| 1976 | "Weekend in New England" / "Say the Words" | 10 | 9 | 1 | — | 9 | 1 | — | — | — | — | — | | This One's for You |
| 1977 | "Looks Like We Made It" / "New York City Rhythm" (from Barry Manilow--Live) | 1 | 3 | 1 | 91 | 8 | 1 | — | — | — | — | — | US: Gold | This One's for You |
| 1977 | "Daybreak" (Live) / "Jump Shout Boogie" | 23 | 21 | 7 | — | 20 | 4 | — | — | — | — | — | | Barry Manilow Live |
| 1977 | "It's Just Another New Year's Eve" | — | — | 33 | — | — | — | — | — | — | — | — | | Barry Manilow Live |
| 1978 | "Can't Smile Without You" / "Sunrise" | 3 | 2 | 1 | 3 | 2 | 4 | — | — | 8 | 13 | 43 | US: Gold | Even Now |
| 1978 | "Even Now" / "I Was a Fool (To Let You Go)" | 19 | 17 | 1 | — | 17 | 14 | — | — | — | — | — | | Even Now |
| 1978 | "Copacabana (At the Copa)" (short version) / "Copacabana" (long version, from Greatest Hits) | 8 | 10 | 6 | 9 | 7 | 3 | 23 | 16 | 37 | — | 190 | US: Gold | Even Now |
| 1978 | "Ready to Take a Chance Again" / "Sweet Life" | 11 | 7 | 5 | — | 4 | 1 | — | — | — | — | — | | Foul Play (film) |
| 1978 | "Somewhere in the Night" / "Leavin' in the Morning" | 9 | 13 | 4 | 81 | 10 | 3 | — | 16 | — | — | 42 | | Even Now |
| 1978 | "Mandy" (reissue) | — | — | — | — | — | — | 19 | — | — | — | — | | The Best of Barry Manilow |
| 1979 | "Ships" / "They Gave in to the Blues" (non-LP track) | 9 | 11 | 4 | 78 | 28 | 5 | — | — | — | — | — | | One Voice |
| 1979 | "When I Wanted You" / "Bobbie Lee (What's the Difference, I Gotta Live)" | 20 | 24 | 1 | — | 53 | 1 | — | — | — | — | — | | One Voice |
| 1980 | "I Don't Want to Walk Without You" / "One Voice" | 36 | 43 | 2 | — | — | 1 | — | | — | — | — | | One Voice |
| 1980 | "Bermuda Triangle" / "One Voice" (from One Voice) | — | — | — | — | — | — | 16 | 23 | — | — | 15 | | Barry |
| 1980 | "I Made It Through the Rain" / "Only in Chicago" | 10 | 18 | 4 | — | 34 | — | — | 20 | — | — | 37 | | Barry |
| 1980 | "Lonely Together" / "The Last Duet" (with Lily Tomlin) | 45 | 47 | 7 | — | — | — | — | 20 | — | — | 21 | | Barry |
| 1981 | "The Old Songs" / "Don't Fall in Love with Me" | 15 | 16 | 1 | — | 43 | 2 | — | — | — | — | 48 | | If I Should Love Again |
| 1981 | "Somewhere Down the Road" / "Let's Take All Night (To Say Goodbye)" | 21 | 21 | 1 | — | — | 7 | — | — | — | — | — | | If I Should Love Again |
| 1982 | "If I Should Love Again" / "Let's Take All Night (To Say Goodbye)" | — | — | — | — | — | — | — | — | — | — | 66 | | If I Should Love Again |
| 1982 | "Let's Hang On!" / "No Other Love" | 32 | 35 | 6 | 4 | — | — | — | 8 | — | — | 12 | AUS: Gold; UK: Silver | If I Should Love Again |
| 1982 | "Stay" (live) / "Nickels and Dimes" | — | — | — | — | — | — | — | — | — | — | 23 | | Barry Live in Britain |
| 1982 | "Oh Julie" / "Break Down the Door" (from If I Should Love Again) | 38 | 50 | 24 | — | — | — | — | — | — | — | — | | Oh, Julie! |
| 1982 | "I Wanna Do It with You" / "Heaven" (from Oh, Julie!) | — | — | — | 35 | — | — | — | 3 | — | — | 8 | | Here Comes the Night |
| 1982 | "Memory" / "Heart of Steel" | 39 | 37 | 8 | — | — | — | — | — | — | — | — | | Here Comes the Night |
| 1982 | "I'm Gonna Sit Right Down and Write Myself a Letter" / "Heart of Steel" | — | — | — | — | — | — | — | 22 | — | — | 36 | | Here Comes the Night |
| 1983 | "Some Kind of Friend" / "Heaven" (from Oh, Julie!) | 26 | 31 | 4 | 38 | 21 | — | — | — | — | — | 48 | | Here Comes the Night |
| 1983 | "Read 'Em and Weep" / "One Voice" (from One Voice) | 18 | 18 | 1 | 84 | 22 | 1 | — | 22 | — | — | 17 | | Greatest Hits Vol. II |
| 1984 | "You're Looking Hot Tonight" | — | — | 25 | — | — | — | 59 | — | — | — | 47 | | Greatest Hits Vol. II |
| 1984 | "When October Goes" | — | — | 6 | — | — | — | — | — | — | — | 85 | | 2:00 AM Paradise Cafe |
| 1985 | "Paradise Cafe" | — | — | 24 | — | — | — | — | — | — | — | — | | 2:00 AM Paradise Cafe |
| 1985 | "Run to Me" (Duet with Dionne Warwick) | — | — | 12 | — | — | — | — | — | — | — | 86 | | Twenty Classic Hits |
| 1985 | "In Search of Love" | — | — | 11 | — | — | — | — | — | — | — | 80 | | Manilow |
| 1986 | "He Doesn't Care (But I Do)" | — | — | 22 | — | — | — | — | — | — | — | — | | Manilow |
| 1986 | "I'm Your Man" / "I'm Your Man" (Dub mix) | 86 | 69 | — | 98 | — | — | — | — | — | — | 96 | | Manilow |
| 1988 | "Brooklyn Blues" | — | — | 13 | — | — | — | — | — | — | — | — | | Swing Street |
| 1988 | "Hey Mambo" / "When October Goes" | 90 | — | — | — | — | — | — | — | — | — | — | | Swing Street |
| 1989 | "Keep Each Other Warm" | — | — | 7 | — | 72 | — | — | — | — | — | — | | Barry Manilow |
| 1989 | "Please Don't Be Scared" | — | — | — | 156 | — | — | — | — | — | — | 35 | | Barry Manilow |
| 1989 | "The One That Got Away" | — | — | 25 | — | — | — | — | — | — | — | 78 | | Barry Manilow |
| 1990 | "Some Good Things Never Last" (with Debra Byrd and Dana Robbins) | — | — | — | — | — | — | — | — | — | — | 79 | | Barry Manilow |
| 1990 | "If I Can Dream" | — | — | — | — | — | — | — | — | — | — | 81 | | Live on Broadway |
| 1990 | "If You Remember Me" | — | — | 41 | — | — | — | — | — | — | — | — | | Live on Broadway |
| 1990 | "Because It's Christmas" | — | — | 38 | — | — | — | — | — | — | — | — | | Because It's Christmas |
| 1990 | "Jingle Bells" | — | — | — | — | — | — | — | — | — | — | — | | Because It's Christmas |
| 1992 | "Another Life" | — | — | 33 | — | — | — | — | — | — | — | — | | The Complete Collection and Then Some... |
| 1993 | "Copacabana (At the Copa) – The 1993 Remix" | — | — | — | 92 | — | — | — | 21 | — | — | 22 | | Hidden Treasures |
| 1993 | "Could It Be Magic 1993" | — | — | — | — | — | — | — | — | — | — | 36 | | Hidden Treasures |
| 1994 | "Let Me Be Your Wings" (with Debra Byrd) | — | — | — | — | — | — | — | — | — | — | 73 | | Thumbelina |
| 1997 | "I'd Really Love to See You Tonight" | — | — | 26 | — | — | — | — | — | — | — | 86 | | Summer of '78 |
| 1997 | "I Go Crazy" | — | — | 30 | — | — | — | — | — | — | — | — | | Summer of '78 |
| 2001 | "Turn the Radio Up" | — | — | 25 | — | — | — | — | — | — | — | — | | Here at the Mayflower |
| 2003 | "River" | — | — | 17 | — | — | — | — | — | — | — | — | | A Christmas Gift of Love |
| 2005 | "Unchained Melody" | — | — | 20 | — | — | — | — | — | — | — | — | | The Greatest Songs of the Fifties |
| 2006 | "Love Is a Many-Splendored Thing" | — | — | 32 | — | — | — | — | — | — | — | — | | The Greatest Songs of the Fifties |
| 2007 | "Have Yourself a Merry Little Christmas" | — | — | 11 | — | — | — | — | — | — | — | — | | In the Swing of Christmas |
| 2008 | "Christmas Is Just Around the Corner" | — | — | 16 | — | — | — | — | — | — | — | — | | Cranberry Christmas |
| 2011 | "Everything's Gonna Be Alright" | — | — | — | — | — | — | — | — | — | — | — | | 15 Minutes |
| 2012 | "Santa Claus Is Coming to Town" | — | — | 2 | — | — | — | — | — | — | — | — | | The Classic Christmas Album |
| 2020 | "When the Good Times Come Again" | — | — | 12 | — | — | — | — | — | — | — | — | | |
| 2022 | "Dancin' in the Aisles" | — | — | — | — | — | — | — | — | — | — | — | | More Songs from Manilow: Music and Passion |
| 2023 | "All I Want for Christmas Is You" | — | — | 15 | — | — | — | — | — | — | — | — | | Non-album single |
| 2025 | "Once Before I Go" | — | — | 25 | — | — | — | — | — | — | — | — | | What a Time |
| 2026 | "Sun Shine" | — | — | — | — | — | — | — | — | — | — | — | | What a Time |
| 2026 | "Another Life-2026" | — | — | — | — | — | — | — | — | — | — | — | | What a Time |
"—" denotes releases that did not chart.
