= The Greatest Songs of the Eighties =

Studio album by Barry Manilow
- Released: November 24, 2008
- Recorded: 2008
- Genre: Pop; Easy Listening
- Label: Arista
- Producer: Barry Manilow, Scott Erickson, Michael Lloyd, Greg O'Connor; Executive Producer: Clive Davis

Barry Manilow chronology
Beautiful Ballads & Love Songs (2008)	The Greatest Songs of the Eighties (2008)	The Greatest Love Songs of All Time (2010)

Professional ratings
Review scores
Source	Rating
Allmusic	2.5/5 stars

The Greatest Songs of the Eighties is an album by Barry Manilow, released on November 24, 2008 through Arista. It was the follow-up to his 2007 album, The Greatest Songs of the Seventies and features 12 songs from the decade of the 1980s.

It was announced that Manilow would preview the album on November 20, 2008, on QVC in an hour long show, QVC Live from the Las Vegas Hilton. Additional recordings that didn't make the final cut include "Every Time You Go Away" (released in the UK) and "Biggest Part of Me", "Everybody Wants To Rule the World" and "Every Breath You Take", all three of which can be found on the rare Songs From the Vault CD.

== Track listing ==
1. "Islands in the Stream" (Kenny Rogers & Dolly Parton cover) (Bee Gees) – 4:06
  - Performed by Barry Manilow & Reba McEntire
2. "Open Arms" (Journey cover) (Steve Perry & Jonathan Cain) – 3:39
3. "Never Gonna Give You Up" (Rick Astley cover) (Stock Aitken Waterman) – 2:54
4. "Have I Told You Lately" (Van Morrison cover) – 4:03
5. "I Just Called to Say I Love You" (Stevie Wonder cover) – 4:05
6. "Against All Odds (Take a Look at Me Now)" (Phil Collins cover) – 3:11
7. "Careless Whisper" (George Michael cover) (George Michael & Andrew Ridgeley) – 3:59
8. "Right Here Waiting" (Richard Marx cover) – 3:38
9. "Arthur's Theme (Best That You Can Do)" (Christopher Cross cover) (Christopher Cross; Burt Bacharach; Carole Bayer Sager; Peter Allen) – 3:46
10. "Hard to Say I'm Sorry" (Chicago cover) (Peter Cetera & David Foster) – 4:04
  - Performed by Barry Manilow & Chicago
11. "Time After Time" (Cyndi Lauper cover) (Cyndi Lauper & Rob Hyman) – 4:06
12. "(I've Had) The Time of My Life" (Bill Medley & Jennifer Warnes cover) (Franke Previte, John DeNicola, Donald Markowitz) – 3:55
