= Jeffrey Katz =

Jeffrey Katz may refer to:

- Jeff Katz, American film producer and comics author
- Jeff Katz (photographer) (born 1960), American photographer
- Jeffry Katz (born 1943), American music producer
