= The Greatest Songs of the Sixties =

Studio album by Barry Manilow
- Released: October 31, 2006
- Recorded: 2006
- Studios: Capitol Studios (Hollywood, California); Peppertree Studios (Palm Springs, California); Ignited Now Studios (Shymar, California)
- Genre: Easy listening/Pop
- Length: 45:00 (US release); 49:54 (UK release)
- Label: Arista
- Producers: Clive Davis; David Benson; Barry Manilow; Phil Ramone

Barry Manilow chronology
| The Greatest Songs of the Fifties (2006) | The Greatest Songs of the Sixties (2006) | The Greatest Songs of the Seventies (2007) |

Professional ratings
Review scores
| Source | Rating |
|---|---|
| Allmusic | 3/5 stars |
| Entertainment Weekly | C |

The Greatest Songs of the Sixties is an album by Barry Manilow, released on October 31, 2006 through Arista Records. The sequel album for The Greatest Songs of the Fifties, it was another major hit for Manilow in the United States, earning a Gold certification from the RIAA. As with its predecessor, this album was produced by Clive Davis, along with Manilow and David Benson. The classics performed in this album includes Frankie Valli's "Can't Take My Eyes Off You", Elvis Presley's number one hit "Can't Help Falling in Love", Beatles' "And I Love Her" and Frank Sinatra's "Strangers in the Night" (the latter first appeared on Manilow's Sinatra-tribute album Manilow Sings Sinatra in 1998).

== Track listing ==
=== US Track listing ===
1. "Can't Take My Eyes Off You" – 3:45
2. "Cherish" / "Windy" (Duet with The Association) – 4:20
3. "Can't Help Falling in Love" – 3:38
4. "There's a Kind of Hush" – 3:01
5. "Blue Velvet" – 2:54
6. "Raindrops Keep Fallin' on My Head" – 3:02
7. "And I Love Her" – 2:55
8. "This Guy's in Love with You" – 4:03
9. "Everybody Loves Somebody" – 2:56
10. "You've Lost That Lovin' Feelin'" – 4:04
11. "When I Fall in Love" – 3:30
12. "Strangers in the Night" – 3:06
13. "What the World Needs Now Is Love" – 3:41

=== UK Track listing ===
1. "Can't Take My Eyes Off You" – 3:40
2. "Cherish" / "Windy" (Duet with The Association) – 4:20
3. "Can't Help Falling in Love" – 3:38
4. "There's a Kind of Hush (All Over the World)" – 3:01
5. "And I Love Her" – 2:55
6. "Blue Velvet" – 2:54
7. "Raindrops Keep Falling on My Head" – 3:02
8. "This Guy's in Love With You" – 4:03
9. "Everybody Loves Somebody" – 2:56
10. "You've Lost That Lovin' Feeling" – 4:04
11. "When I Fall in Love" – 3:30
12. "Strangers in the Night" – 3:06
13. "What the World Needs Now Is Love" – 3:41
14. "California Dreamin'" - 2:47
15. "Yesterday" - 2:07

== Personnel ==
Musicians and Vocalists

- Barry Manilow – vocals, acoustic piano, arrangements (2-5, 7, 9-11, 13)
- Randy Waldman – acoustic piano
- Tom Ranier – acoustic piano (12)
- Douglas Besterman – additional keyboards (12), rhythm sequencing (12)
- Michael Skloff – additional keyboards (12), rhythm sequencing (12)
- PierGiorgio Bertucelli – additional keyboards (12), rhythm sequencing (12)
- Ken Berry – guitars, arrangements (6, 7)
- Mike Lent – guitars
- James Harrah – electric guitar (12)
- Dean Parks – guitars (12)
- John Pisano – guitars (12)
- Dave Carpenter – bass
- Chuck Berghofer – bass (12)
- John Peña – electric bass (12)
- Russ McKinnon – drums
- Gregg Field – drums (12)
- Paulinho da Costa – percussion
- Dan Greco – percussion
- Bob Gaudio – arrangements (1)
- Artie Schroeck – arrangements (1)
- Doug Walter – arrangements (3, 5, 11)
- Kevin Bassinson – arrangements (8, 13)
- Jonathan Barrick Griffiths – arrangements (9)
- Randy Crenshaw – BGV contractor
- Ron Dante – backing vocals
- Linda Harmon – backing vocals
- Walt Harrah – backing vocals
- Jon Joyce – backing vocals
- Rick Logan – backing vocals
- Connie Nassios – backing vocals
- Susie Stevens – backing vocals
- Dick Wells – backing vocals
- The Association – vocals (2)

Orchestra

- Jonathan Barrick Griffiths – orchestration and conductor (1, 4, 9)
- Kevin Bassinson – orchestration and conductor (2, 8, 10, 13)
- Doug Walter – orchestration and conductor (3, 5, 11)
- Ken Berry – orchestration and conductor (6, 7)
- Douglas Besterman – orchestration and conductor (12)
- Joe Soldo – orchestra contractor
- Assa Drori – violin concertmaster

Brass and Woodwind section

- Steve Kujala – flute
- Gene Cipriano, Gary Foster, Dan Higgins, Greg Huckins and Joe Stone – saxophones
- Steve Baxter, Craig Gosnell, Charles Loper and Chauncey Welsch – trombone
- Wayne Bergeron, Gary Grant, Chris Gray and Warren Leuning – trumpet
- Tommy Johnson – tuba
- Mark Adams, Steve Becknell and Paul Klintworth – French horn

String section

- Larry Corbett, Armen Ksajikian, Dane Little, Timothy Loo, Tina Soule and John Walz – cello
- Marcia Dickstein and Gayle Levant – harp
- Ken Burward-Hoy, Sam Formicola, Carrie Holzman, Andrew Picken, Harry Shiranian, Ray Tischer – viola
- Darius Campo, Daphne Chen, Lisa Dondlinger, Assa Drori, Sam Fisher, Ronald Folsom, Neel Hammond, Ray Kobler, Johanna Krejci, Liane Mautner, Cindy Moussas, Jennifer Munday, David Stenske, Yan To, Miwako Watanabe and Dynell Weber – violin

Music Preparation

- Bill Baker, Curt Berg, Bill Edwards, Gisela Garcia Brugada, J. Barrick Griffiths, Jackie Johnson, Yeli Lim, Danny Perito and Terry Woodson Music

== Production ==
- Garry C. Kief – executive producer, management
- Steve Ferrera – A&R
- David Benson – producer, additional recording, editing, Pro Tools
- Clive Davis – producer
- Barry Manilow – producer
- Phil Ramone – producer (12)
- Greg Bartheld – associate producer, additional recording, editing, Pro Tools
- Marc Hulett – associate producer
- Bruce Botnick – recording
- Al Schmitt – mixing
- Don Murray – recording (12), mixing (12)
- Kogi Egawa – additional recording, editing, Pro Tools
- Jimmy Hoyson – assistant engineer
- Charlie Paakkari – assistant engineer
- Aaron Walk – assistant engineer
- Steve Genewick – assistant mix engineer
- Bill Smith – assistant mix engineer
- Doug Sax – mastering
- Sangwook Nam – mastering
- The Mastering Lab (Ojai, California) – mastering location
- Marsha Burns – production manager
- Jeff Schulz – design
- Jeff Katz – photography

== Charts ==
=== Weekly charts ===
| Chart (2006) | Peak position |
|---|---|
| Scottish Albums (Official Charts) | 84 |
| UK Albums (Official Charts) | 56 |
| US Billboard 200 | 2 |

=== Year-end charts ===
| Chart (2007) | Position |
|---|---|
| US Billboard 200 | 186 |

== Certifications ==
| Region | Certification | Certified units/sales |
|---|---|---|
| United Kingdom (BPI) | Gold | 100,000^{^} |
^{^} Shipments figures based on certification alone.
