= In the Swing of Christmas =

Studio album by Barry Manilow
- Released: November 1, 2007 / October 13, 2009 (re-release)
- Recorded: 2007
- Studio: Studio At The Palms and Pepper Tree Studios (Las Vegas, Nevada); Capitol Studios (Hollywood, California); Pepper Tree Studios (Palm Springs, California); Firehouse Studios (Pasadena, California); SongLee Studios (La Cañada, California)
- Genre: Christmas
- Length: 34:10 / 39:31 (re-release)
- Label: Hallmark / Arista
- Producer: Barry Manilow; Scott Erickson; Michael Lloyd; Greg O'Connor

Barry Manilow chronology
The Greatest Songs of the Seventies (2007)	In the Swing of Christmas (2007)	Beautiful Ballads & Love Songs (2008)

Professional ratings
Review scores
Source	Rating
AllMusic	4/5 stars

In the Swing of Christmas is the third Christmas-themed album by Barry Manilow. Released on November 1, 2007, it was available exclusively at Hallmark Gold Crown stores. The album was certified Gold in the United States by the RIAA in 2008, and was nominated for a Grammy in the 'Best Traditional Pop Vocal Album' category at the 51st Annual Grammy Awards.

Produced and arranged by Manilow and co-produced by Scott Erickson, the album features more of a swing jazz style than his previous Christmas releases. The jazz ensemble MaD Fusion (Note: credited as The Matt Herskowitz Trio on the 2009 re-release) (Matt Herskowitz—piano, Mat Fieldes—bass, and David Rozenblatt—drums) accompanied Manilow on four tracks, and The Randy Kerber Trio (Randy Kerber—piano, Mike Valerio—bass, and Joe LaBarbera—drums) was featured on five tracks, along with various other musicians. The first track, "Silver Bells", was performed a capella, with Manilow overdubbing all of the vocals himself. The album included instructions for downloading a bonus track, "It Came Upon the Midnight Clear".

On October 13, 2009, the album was re-released on Arista Records with two bonus tracks: "Rudolph the Red Nosed Reindeer" and "Christmas Is Just Around the Corner", an original song from the 2008 animated television special Cranberry Christmas. The downloadable bonus track from the Hallmark release was not included. The re-release appeared on the Billboard 200 chart for four non-consecutive weeks in late 2009, peaking at #127 during the week ending December 19.

== Track listing ==
=== 2007 release ===
1. "Silver Bells" – 2:37
2. "Carol of the Bells / Jingle Bells" – 2:45
3. "Joy to the World / It's the Most Wonderful Time of the Year" – 3:07
4. "Have Yourself a Merry Little Christmas" – 4:06
5. "Violets for Your Furs" – 3:22
6. "O Tannenbaum" / "Winter Wonderland" – 2:57
7. "Christmas Time Is Here" – 4:35
8. "The Christmas Song (Chestnuts Roasting On an Open Fire)" – 3:18
9. "Toyland" (Victor Herbert, Glen MacDonough) – 3:23
10. "Count Your Blessings" – 3:48

==== downloadable bonus track ====
1. "It Came Upon the Midnight Clear"

=== 2009 re-release ===
1. "Silver Bells" – 2:37
2. "Carol of the Bells / Jingle Bells" – 2:45
3. "Joy to the World / It's the Most Wonderful Time of the Year" – 3:07
4. "Have Yourself a Merry Little Christmas" – 4:06
5. "Violets for Your Furs" – 3:22
6. "O Tannenbaum" / "Winter Wonderland" – 2:57
7. "Christmas Time Is Here" – 4:35
8. "The Christmas Song (Chestnuts Roasting On an Open Fire)" – 3:18
9. "Toyland" (Victor Herbert, Glen MacDonough) – 3:23
10. "Count Your Blessings" – 3:48
11. "Rudolph the Red Nosed Reindeer" – 2:26
12. "Christmas Is Just Around the Corner" (Barry Manilow, Bruce Sussman) – 2:54

== Personnel ==
- Barry Manilow – vocals, arrangements
- Matt Herskowitz – acoustic piano (2, 3, 6, 7)
- Randy Kerber – acoustic piano (4, 5, 8–10), horn arrangements (9)
- Ron Pedley – additional keyboards (2–10)
- Michael Lang – acoustic piano (11)
- Scott Erickson – programming (11)
- Jim Cox – keyboards (12)
- George Doering – guitars (2–11)
- Tim Pierce – guitars (12)
- Mat Fieldes – bass (2, 3, 6, 7)
- Mike Valerio – bass (4, 5, 8–10)
- Chuck Berghofer – bass (11)
- Leland Sklar – bass guitar (12)
- David Rozenblatt – drums (2, 3, 6, 7), percussion (11)
- Joe LaBarbera – drums (4, 5, 8–10)
- Gregg Fields – drums (11)
- John Ferraro – drums (12)
- Tom Scott – saxophones (9), flute (9)
- Sal Lozano – woodwinds (11)
- Eric Marienthal – woodwinds (11)
- Jay Mason – woodwinds (11)
- Andy Martin – trombone (11)
- Charlie Morillas – trombone (11)
- Warren Luening – trumpet (9, 11)
- Jeff Bunnell – trumpet (11)
- Dan Fornero – trumpet (11)
- Brian O'Connor – French horn (11)
- Roger Treece – additional arrangements (1), vocal orchestration (1)
- Ray Ellis – arrangements (11)
- Randy Crenshaw – backing vocals (2, 11), BGV arrangements (2, 11)
- Susan Stevens – backing vocals (2, 11)
- Jeff Gunn – backing vocals (11)
- Scottie Haskell – backing vocals (11)
- Jeffrey Foskett – backing vocals (12)
- Michael Lloyd – backing vocals (12), arrangements (12)
- Patti Lloyd – backing vocals (12)
- Debbie Lytton – backing vocals (12)
- Greg O'Connor – backing vocals (12), arrangements (12)
- Jenni Snyder – backing vocals (12)
- Susanna Wolk – backing vocals (12)

=== Production ===
- Garry C. Kief – executive producer, management
- Barry Manilow – producer (1–10)
- Scott Erickson – co-producer (1–10), mixing (1–10), producer (11)
- Michael Lloyd – producer (12), engineer (12), mixing (12)
- Greg O'Connor – producer (12)
- Marc Hulett – associate producer (1–10)
- Don Murray – recording (1–10), additional mixing (1)
- Bill Schnee – recording (11), mixing (11)
- Bob Kearney – engineer (12)
- Greg Bartheld – additional engineer (1–10), technical assistance (1–10)
- Koji Egawa – additional engineer (1–11), technical assistance (1–10)
- Mark Gray – assistant engineer (1–10)
- Dan Monti – assistant engineer (1–10)
- Charlie Paakkari – assistant engineer (1–10)
- Justin Pintar – assistant engineer (1–10)
- Charlie Bybee – assistant engineer (11)
- Nigel Lundemo – assistant engineer (12)
- Doug Sax – mastering
- Sangwook Nam – mastering
- The Mastering Lab (Hollywood, California) – mastering location
- Cristina Abaroa – additional production assistant
- Hallmark Marketing Studio – design, liner notes
- Jeff Katz – photography
- Stiletto Entertainment – management
