= The Greatest Love Songs of All Time =

Studio album by Barry Manilow
- Released: January 26, 2010
- Recorded: 2009
- Studio: Capitol Studios (Hollywood, California); 20th Century Fox Scoring Stage (Los Angeles, California); Pepper Tree Studios (Palm Springs, California); The Studio One (Malibu, California)
- Genre: Pop
- Length: 43:50
- Label: Arista
- Producer: Clive Davis; Barry Manilow; Michael Lloyd

Barry Manilow chronology
The Greatest Songs of the Eighties (2008)	The Greatest Love Songs of All Time (2010)	15 Minutes (2011)

Professional ratings
Review scores
Source	Rating
AllMusic	3/5 stars

The Greatest Love Songs of All Time is a studio album by American singer Barry Manilow, released on January 26, 2010 through Arista.

The album debuted on the Billboard 200 album chart at number 5, but dropped in its second week to number 40. It also debuted in the UK charts at number 26. This album also received a Grammy nomination in the category Best Traditional Pop Vocal Album.

== Track listing ==
No.	Title	Writer(s)	Length
1.	"Love Is Here to Stay"	George & Ira Gershwin	3:51
2.	"The Look of Love"	Burt Bacharach and Hal David	3:36
3.	"(Where Do I Begin?) Love Story"	Francis Lai and Carl Sigman	3:08
4.	"I Only Have Eyes for You"	Al Dubin and Harry Warren	4:12
5.	"I Can't Give You Anything but Love, Baby"	Dorothy Fields and Jimmy McHugh	3:39
6.	"The Twelfth of Never"	Jerry Livingston and Paul Webster	3:46
7.	"We've Only Just Begun"	Roger Nichols and Paul Williams	3:24
8.	"Nevertheless"	Harry Ruby and Bert Kalmar	3:06
9.	"Love Me Tender"	Elvis Presley and Vera Matson	3:31
10.	"You Made Me Love You"	Joe McCarthy and James V. Monaco	2:53
11.	"It Could Happen to You"	Johnny Burke and James Van Heusen
12.	"How Deep Is the Ocean?"	Irving Berlin	3:05
13.	"When You Were Sweet Sixteen"	James Thornton	3:09

== Personnel ==
Rhythm section

- Barry Manilow – vocals, acoustic piano, arrangements
- Alan Broadbent – acoustic piano
- Randy Kerber – acoustic piano
- Laurence Juber – guitars
- Dean Parks – guitars
- Tim Pierce – guitars
- Chuck Berghofer – bass
- Chuck Domanico – bass
- Leland Sklar – bass
- Vinnie Colaiuta – drums
- Gregg Field – drums
- Carlos Vega – drums
- Paulinho da Costa – percussion
- Brian Kilgore – percussion
- Patrick Williams – arrangements (1–7, 9, 11)
- Doug Walter – arrangements (10, 12)

Orchestra

- Joe Soldo – orchestra contractor
- Assa Drori – concertmaster

Brass and Woodwinds

- Lee Callet, Gene Cipriano, Gary Foster, Dave Hill, Greg Huckins, Bob Sheppard and David Shostac – woodwinds
- Charles Loper, Bob McChesney, Charlie Morillas and Phil Teele – trombone
- Wayne Bergeron, Charles Davis, Warren Luening and Larry McGuire – trumpet
- Jim Atkinson, Steve Becknell, Justin Hagerman and Phil Klintworth – French horn

String section

- Trevor Handy, Paula Hochhalter, John Krovoza, Armen Ksajikian, Timothy Loo, Diego Mirillas, Tina Soule, David Speltz, Cecila Tsan and John Walz – cello
- Nico Abondolo, Drew Dembowski and Ramon Stagnaro – contrabass
- Gayle Levant – harp
- Alma Fernandez, Roland Kato, Vicki Miskolczy, Harry Shirinian, Ray Tischer, David Walther and Rodney Wirtz – viola
- Brian Benning, Rebecca Bunnell, Darius Campo, Kevin Connolly, Joel Derouin, Lisa Dondlinger, Assa Drori, Ronald Folsom, Neel Hammond, Miran Kojian, Johana Krejci, Songa Lee, Liane Mautner, Jennifer Munday, Alyssa Park, Katia Popov, Anatoly Rosinsky, Audrey Solomon, Tereza Stanislav, Irina Voloshina and Rita Weber – violin

Music preparation

- Bill Baker, Gordon C. Berg, Jonathan Barracks Griffiths, Daniel Perito, Penny Watson and Terry Woodson

== Production ==
- Garry C. Kief – executive producer, management
- Clive Davis – producer
- Barry Manilow – producer, rhythm producer, engineer
- Michael Lloyd – producer, engineer, mixing, Pro Tools engineer
- Marc Hulett – associate producer
- Eddie Arkin – rhythm producer
- Bob Kearney – rhythm engineer
- Allen Sides – engineer
- Armin Steiner – engineer
- Steve Genewick – assistant engineer
- Tim Lauber – assistant engineer
- Nigel Lundemo – Pro Tools engineer
- Larry Mah – Pro Tools engineer
- George Leger III – digital editing
- Dave Collins – mastering at Dave Collins Mastering (Hollywood, California)
- Erwin Gorostiza – creative direction, art direction, design
- Denise Trotman – art direction, design
- Greg Gorman – photography
- Tom Steele – stage manager
