= Showstoppers (album) =

Studio album by Barry Manilow
- Released: September 24, 1991
- Studio: Rumbo Recorders (Canoga Park, California); Smoketree Ranch (Chatsworth, California)
- Genre: Pop; Easy listening
- Length: 61:32
- Label: Arista
- Producer: Barry Manilow; Eddie Arkin

Barry Manilow chronology
Because It's Christmas (1990)	Showstoppers (1991)	The Complete Collection and Then Some... (1992)

Professional ratings
Review scores
Source	Rating
AllMusic	3/5 stars
Entertainment Weekly	C−
The Rolling Stone Album Guide	2.5/5 stars

Showstoppers is an album by singer-songwriter Barry Manilow, released in 1991. It was his first album to not feature any original music.

== Track listing ==
1. "Give My Regards to Broadway (from Little Johnny Jones) - 1:08 (George M. Cohan)
2. "Overture of Overtures" - 4:11
3. "All I Need is the Girl" (from Gypsy) - 2:50 (Jule Styne, Stephen Sondheim)
4. "Real Live Girl" (from Little Me) - 3:26 (Cy Coleman, Carolyn Leigh, Neil Simon)
5. "Where or When" (from Babes in Arms) - 4:28 (Richard Rodgers, Lorenz Hart)
6. "Look to the Rainbow" [duet with Barbara Cook] (from Finian's Rainbow) - 4:31 (Burton Lane, E.Y. Harbourg)
7. "Once in Love With Amy" (from Where's Charley?) - 4:19 (Frank Loesser)
8. "Dancing in the Dark" (from The Band Wagon) - 3:21 (Howard Dietz, Arthur Schwartz)
9. "You Can Have the TV" (from Notes) - 2:48 (Craig Carnelia)
10. "I'll Be Seeing You" (from Right This Way) - 3:14 (Irving Kahal, Sammy Fain)
11. "But the World Goes 'Round" (from And the World Goes 'Round) - 3:52 (John Kander, Fred Ebb)
12. "Fugue for Tinhorns" [trio with Michael Crawford & Hinton Battle] (from Guys and Dolls) - 2:47 (Loesser)
13. "Luck Be a Lady" (from Guys and Dolls) - 2:15 (Loesser)
14. "Old Friends" (from Merrily We Roll Along) - 1:09 (Sondheim)
15. "The Kid Inside" (from Is There Life After High School?) - 3:59 (Carnelia)
16. "Never Met a Man I Didn't Like" (from The Will Rogers Follies) - 4:59 (Coleman/Betty Comden, Adolph Green)
17. "Bring Him Home" (from Les Misérables) - 3:46 (Claude-Michel Schönberg, Alain Boublil, Herbert Kretzmer)
18. "If We Only Have Love" (from Jacques Brel is Alive and Well and Living in Paris) - 3:51 (Jacques Brel)

== Personnel ==
Vocalists

- Barry Manilow – vocals
- Beth Anderson, Susan Boyd, Jon Joyce and Joe Pizzulo – backing singers (2)
- Barbara Cook – vocals (6)
- Patricia Arkin, Debra Byrd, Keith Carlisle, Phillip Dennis, Susan DuBow, Marc Hulett, Garry C. Kief, Paul Levine, Dolores Mazzolla, Reparata, Steve Wax, Ken Welch and Mitzie Welch – chorus (7)
- Michael Crawford and Hinton Battle – vocals (12)

Musicians (Tracks 1, 5, 8–10, 12, 14–16 & 18)

- Randy Kerber – acoustic piano (1, 5, 8, 10, 12, 14–16, 18), synthesizers (5, 9, 10, 15, 16, 18)
- Mitch Holder – guitar solo (5), guitar (8)
- Eddie Arkin – guitar (9, 18)
- Dean Parks – guitar (15, 16, 18)
- Abraham Laboriel – bass guitar (5, 8, 15, 18)
- Chuck Berghofer – bass guitar (10)
- John Patitucci – bass guitar (12, 16)
- Carlos Vega – drums (5, 8, 10, 12, 15, 16, 18)
- Dan Higgins – saxophones (12)
- Joel Peskin – saxophones (12)
- Bill Reichenbach Jr. – trombone (12)
- Gary Grant – trumpet (12)
- Jerry Hey – trumpet (12)

Musicians and Orchestra (Tracks 2–4, 6, 7, 11, 13 & 17)

- Randy Kerber and Tom Ranier – acoustic piano
- Pat Coil, Randy Kerber and Tom Ranier – synthesizers
- Dennis Budimir and John Pondel – guitars
- John Clayton, Jimmy DeJulio, Arni Eglisson, Abraham Laboriel and John Patitucci – bass
- Sol Gubin, Steve Houghton, Harvey Mason, Carlos Vega and Dave Weckl – drums
- Larry Bunker, Judith Chilnick, Alan Estes, Joe Porcaro and Walfredo Reyes Jr. – percussion
- Donald Ashworth, Gene Cipriano, Earl Dumler, Gary Foster, Bill Green, Gary Herbig, Dan Higgins, Ronny Lang, Dick Mitchell, Jack Nimitz, Joe Soldo and Bob Tricarico – woodwinds
- William Booth, Bryant Byers, Alan Kaplan, Charles Loper, Dick Nash, Jim Self, Kenny Shroyer and Chauncey Welsch – trombone
- Rick Baptist, Stuart Blumberg, Oscar Brashear, Bobby Bryant, Buddy Childers, Chuck Findley, Gary Grant, Walter Johnson and Larry McGuire – trumpet
- Tommy Johnson – tuba
- Marni Johnson, Brian O'Connor, Kurt Snyder and Brad Warnaar – French horn
- Ronald Cooper, Christine Ermacoff, Barbara Hunter, Ray Kelley, Ray Kramer, Earl Madison, Nils Oliver, Harry Shultz and Tina Soule – cello
- Gayle Levant and Joann Turovsky – harp
- Bob Becker, Sam Boghossian, Richard Elegino, Myra Kestenbaum, Linda Lipsett, Carole Mukogawa, Dan Neufeld, Harry Shirinian, Lynn Subotnik, Raymond Tischer and Herschel Wise – viola
- Murray Adler, Israel Baker, Jackie Brand, Mari Botniclk, Bobby Bruce, Bette Byers, Harold Dicterow, Bonnie Douglas, Assa Drori, Bruce Dukov, Ron Folsom, Irv Gellar, Harold Goldman, Alex Horvath, Ezra Klegar, Bernie Kundell, Razdan Kutumjian, Carl LaMagna, Joy Lyle, Michael Markman, Stan Plummer, Bob Sanov, Sheldon Sanov, Sid Sharp, Paul Shure, Alex Treger, Dorothy Wade, Francine Walsh and Tibor Zelig – violin
- Frank Capp and Bill Hughes – orchestra contractors
- Doug Dana, Janice Hayen, Bill Hughes, Bob Hurrell, Jeff Jones, C. Lake, Diz Mullins, Yvonne Richardson, Jim Surrell and Dick Thurik – music copyists

Arrangements

- Barry Manilow (1, 9, 10, 12, 14–16, 18)
- Eddie Arkin (1, 5, 8–10, 12, 14–16)
- Billy Byers – orchestra arrangements (2–4, 6, 7, 11, 13), orchestra conductor (3, 4, 11, 13)
- Bruce Broughton – orchestra conductor (2, 6)
- Jerry Hey – additional horn arrangements (11), horn arrangements (12)
- Artie Butler – orchestra arrangements and conductor (18)

== Production ==
- Barry Manilow – producer
- Eddie Arkin – producer
- Don Murray – recording, mixing
- Shawn Berman – assistant engineer
- Squeak Stone – assistant engineer
- Robert Vosgien – digital editing at CMS Digital (Pasadena, California)
- Wally Traugott – mastering at Capitol Studios (Hollywood, California)
- Marc Hulett – personal assistant, credit coordinator
- Les Joyce – production coordinator
- Carolyn Quan – art direction, design
- Randee St. Nicholas – photography
- Ron Oates – set design
- Alfonso Noe – grooming
- Deborah Waknin – wardrobe stylist
- Garry C. Kief – management
