= The Greatest Songs of the Seventies =

Studio album by Barry Manilow
- Released: September 18, 2007
- Recorded: 2007
- Studios: Capitol Studios and Henson Recording Studios (Hollywood, California); Larrabee Sound Studios and Schnee Studio (North Hollywood, California); Pepper Tree Studios (Palm Springs, California); WallyWorld Studios (Burbank, California); SongLee Studios (La Cañada, California); Ignited Now Studios (Kagal Canyon, California); Pepper Tree Studios (Las Vegas, Nevada)
- Genre: Easy Listening/Pop
- Length: 1:08:24
- Label: Arista
- Producers: Barry Manilow; Clive Davis; David Benson; Walter Afanasieff; Scott Erickson; Eddie Arkin; Ken Berry

Barry Manilow chronology
The Greatest Songs of the Sixties (2006)	The Greatest Songs of the Seventies (2007)	In the Swing of Christmas (2007)

Professional ratings
Review scores
Source	Rating
Allmusic	2.5/5 stars

The Greatest Songs of the Seventies is an album by Barry Manilow, released on September 18, 2007, through Arista Records. It was the follow up to his previous album, The Greatest Songs of the Sixties, and features some of Manilow's hits in acoustic. The Greatest Songs of the Seventies debuted at number four on the U.S. Billboard 200 chart, selling about 113,000 copies in its first week.

Album producer Clive Davis said about Manilow, "No one can reinvent the great classics better than Barry Manilow. He breathes new life and vitality into these truly wonderful songs and they sound fresh and timeless. We continue on the mission to bring to a new generation the great songs of a different era." Davis has worked with Manilow since the 1970s and had been good friends.

== Track listing ==
1. "The Way We Were" (Barbra Streisand cover, 1974) - 2:53
2. "My Eyes Adored You" (The Four Seasons cover, 1975) - 3:33
3. "Bridge Over Troubled Water" (Simon & Garfunkel cover, 1970) - 4:55
4. "How Can You Mend A Broken Heart?" (Bee Gees cover, 1971) - 3:31
5. "It Never Rains in Southern California" (Albert Hammond cover, 1972) - 3:49
6. "You've Got a Friend" (Duet with Melissa Manchester) (James Taylor cover, 1971) - 4:44
7. "He Ain't Heavy, He's My Brother" (The Hollies/Neil Diamond cover, 1969) - 3:57
8. "Sailing" (Christopher Cross cover, 1979) - 4:36
9. "The Long and Winding Road" (The Beatles cover, 1970) - 3:29
10. "(They Long to Be) Close to You" (The Carpenters cover, 1970) - 3:40
11. "If" (Bread cover, 1971) - 2:49
12. "Sorry Seems To Be The Hardest Word" (Elton John cover, 1976) - 4:06
13. "Mandy" (Acoustic), 1974 - 3:24
14. "Weekend in New England" (Acoustic), 1977 - 3:46
15. "Copacabana (At The Copa)" (Acoustic), 1978 - 4:02
16. "Even Now" (Acoustic), 1978 - 3:38
17. "Looks Like We Made It" (Acoustic), 1977 - 3:33
18. "I Write the Songs" (Acoustic), 1975 - 3:59

UK Release Bonus Track

1. "Could It Be Magic" (Trevor Horn dance mix) - 5:01

Tracks 13–18 had all originally been recorded by Barry Manilow himself in their respective years.

== Personnel ==
Vocalists and Rhythm Section

- Barry Manilow – vocals, acoustic piano, arrangements (1, 6, 10–13)
- Kevin Bassinson – acoustic piano, arrangements (6)
- Scott Erickson – acoustic piano, keyboards, backing vocals, arrangements (11, 12)
- Randy Kerber – acoustic piano
- Ron Pedley – acoustic piano, keyboards, arrangements (17)
- Ron Walters Jr. – acoustic piano, arrangements (17)
- Walter Afanasieff – keyboard and rhythm programming (3, 7, 8), arrangements (3, 7, 8)
- Tyler Gordon – programming (3, 7, 8)
- Ken Berry – guitars, arrangements (15, 17)
- George Doering – guitars
- Mike Lent – guitars, arrangements (17)
- Tim Pierce – guitars
- Michael Landau – guitars (3, 7, 8)
- Dave Carpenter – rhythm bass
- Ian Martin – bass, arrangements (17)
- Russ McKinnon – drums, arrangements (17)
- Alex Acuña – percussion
- Luis Conte – percussion
- Paulinho da Costa – percussion
- Daniel Greco – percussion
- David Rozenblatt – percussion
- Jorge Calandrelli – arrangements (1)
- Randy Crenshaw – backing vocals, BGV contractor
- Bill Cantos – backing vocals
- Ron Dante – backing vocals
- Tim Davis – backing vocals, BGV contractor
- Karen Harper – backing vocals
- Angie Jeree – backing vocals
- David Loucks – backing vocals
- Susie Stevens – backing vocals
- Mabvuto Carpenter – backing vocals (3, 7, 8)
- Jason Morales – backing vocals (3, 7, 8)
- Tiffany Smith – backing vocals (3, 7, 8)
- Melissa Manchester – vocals (6)

Orchestra

- Jorge Calandrelli – orchestration and conductor (1), orchestral arrangements and conductor (3, 7, 8)
- Kevin Bassinson – orchestration and conductor (2, 6)
- Doug Walter – orchestration and conductor (4), orchestration (9)
- Scott Erickson – orchestration and conductor (5, 11, 12)
- Ron Walters Jr. – conductor (16)
- Joe Soldo – music contractor
- Gina Zimmitti – orchestra contractor (3, 7, 8)
- Assa Drori – concertmaster

Brass and Woodwind section

- Phil O'Connor – clarinet
- Brandon Fields, Gary Foster, Greg Huckins and Sheridon Stokes – flute
- David Kossoff and Joe Stone – oboe
- Steve Baxter, Craig Gosnell, Charles Loper and Chauncey Welsch – trombone
- Gary Grant, Chris Gray, Warren Luening and Larry McGuire – trumpet
- Jim Atkinson, Steve Becknell, Daniel P. Kelley and Paul Klintworth – French horn

String section

- Larry Corbett, Trevor Handy, Paula Hochhalter, John Kravoza, Roger Lebow, Timothy Loo, Christina Soule, David Speltz and John Walz – cello
- Chuck Berghofer, Drew Dembowski and Oscar Hidalgo – double bass
- Julie Berghofer and Gayle Levant – harp
- Caroline Buckman, Kenneth Burward-Hoy, Andrew Duckles, Alma Fernandez, Sam Formicola, Harry Shirinian and Ray Tischer – viola
- Brian Benning, Rebecca Bunnell, Darius Campo, Ron Clark, Kevin Connolly, Yue Deng, Joel Derouin, Lisa Dondlinger, Assa Drori, Nina Evtuhov, Samuel Fischer, Ronald Folsom, Neel Hammond, Patricia Johnson, Raymond Kobler, Miran Kojian, Johana Krejci, Songa Lee, Liane Mautner, Cindy Moussas, Jennifer Munday, Alyssa Park, Anatoly Rosinsky, Haim Shtrum, Audrey Solomon, Yan To, Paul Tseitlin, Josefina Vergara, Irina Volshina, Miwako Watanabe, Jennifer Watson, Dynell Weber and Margaret Wooten – violin

Music preparation

- Bill Baker, Curt Berg, Bill Edwards, Jonathan Barrack Griffiths, Daniel Perito, Yeli Lim, Penny Watson Crum and Terry Woodson
- Cristina Abaroa, Ron Pedley, Doug Walter and Ron Walters Jr. – additional music preparation

== Production ==
- Garry C. Kief – executive producer, management
- David Benson – album producer
- Clive Davis – album producer
- Barry Manilow – album producer, producer (10, 11)
- Walter Afanasieff – producer (3, 7, 8)
- Eddie Arkin – producer (10)
- Scott Erickson – producer (11), associate producer
- Ken Berry – producer (15)
- Greg Bartheld – associate producer
- Marc Hulett – associate producer
- Rich Davis – project coordinator (3, 7, 8)
- Jeff Katz – photography
- Jane Marledge – creative direction
- Maria Marulanda – design

Technical

- Doug Sax and Sangwook Nam – mastering at The Mastering Lab (Ojai, California)
- Bill Schnee – mixing at Schnee Studio (North Hollywood, California)
- Darius Fong – assistant mix engineer

Tracks 1, 2, 4–6 & 9–18

- Bruce Botnick – recording
- Steve Genewick – assistant engineer
- Justin Pintar – assistant engineer
- Paul Smith – assistant engineer
- Aaron Walk – assistant engineer
- Greg Bartheld – additional recording, editing
- David Benson – additional recording, editing
- Brian Donovan – additional recording, editing
- Koji Egawa – additional recording, editing
- Scott Erickson – additional recording, editing
- Barry Manilow – additional recording, editing
- Bill Schnee – additional recording, editing
- Tommy Vicari – additional recording, editing

Tracks 3, 7 & 8

- Tyler Gordon – Pro Tools engineer
- Steve Churchyard – orchestra engineer
- Barry Manilow – lead vocal engineer
- Chris Brooke – additional engineer
- David Channing – additional engineer
- Koji Egawa – additional engineer
- Thomas "Tawgs" Salter – additional engineer

== Certifications ==
Region	Certification	Certified units/sales
United Kingdom (BPI)	Silver	60,000^{‡}
^{‡} Sales+streaming figures based on certification alone.
