= Because It's Christmas =

Studio album by Barry Manilow
- Released: September 25, 1990
- Studios: Sunset Sound, Ocean Way Recording and Capitol Studios (Hollywood, California); Digital Recorders (Nashville, Tennessee)
- Genres: Christmas; swing; jazz
- Length: 42:35
- Label: Arista
- Producers: Barry Manilow; Eddie Arkin

Barry Manilow chronology
| Live on Broadway (1990) | Because It's Christmas (1990) | Showstoppers (1991) |

Professional ratings
Review scores
| Source | Rating |
|---|---|
| AllMusic | 3/5 stars |
| Entertainment Weekly | C+ |

Because It's Christmas is the first of three Christmas-themed albums released by singer-songwriter Barry Manilow. The album was released in 1990 and was a huge success, becoming Manilow's first platinum album in the United States since 1980's Barry. It also began a period in Manilow's career in which he recorded cover albums. Each album would focus on a particular style of music. He continued this pattern until the release of Here at the Mayflower in 2001.

The version of "Jingle Bells" on the album is a cover of the 1943 recording by Bing Crosby and The Andrews Sisters with the girl group Exposé taking the Andrews Sisters' part. The album also finally included his perennial favorite New Years Eve song "It's Just Another New Years Eve".

Because It's Christmas was the best-selling Christmas album of 1990 in the U.S. The album peaked at number 40 on the Billboard 200 album sales chart, and spent five weeks at number 1 on Billboard magazine's special, year-end, weekly Christmas Albums sales chart in December 1990 and January 1991.

On July 19, 2002, Because It's Christmas was certified Platinum by the Recording Industry Association of America for shipments of one million copies in the U.S.

== Track listing ==
Side 1

1. "The Christmas Song" (Mel Tormé, Robert Wells) - 3:54
2. "Jingle Bells" (Duet with Exposé) (James Pierpont) - 2:39
3. "Silent Night/I Guess There Ain't No Santa Claus" (Eddie Arkin, Barry Manilow, Johnny Mercer, Traditional) - 5:19
4. "The First Noel/When the Meadow Was Bloomin'" (Barry Manilow, Johnny Mercer, Traditional) - 5:01
5. "Excerpt from Handel's Messiah/Because It's Christmas" (Jack Feldman, Barry Manilow, Bruce Sussman) - 5:28

Side 2

1. "Baby, It's Cold Outside" (Duet with K.T. Oslin) (Frank Loesser) - 5:19
2. "White Christmas" (Irving Berlin) - 1:32
3. "Carol of the Bells/The Bells of Christmas" (Adrienne Anderson, Barry Manilow, Peter J. Wilhousky) - 4:48
4. "Joy to the World/Have Yourself a Merry Little Christmas" (Ralph Blane, Hugh Martin, Traditional) - 3:46
5. "We Wish You a Merry Christmas/It's Just Another New Year's Eve" (Barry Manilow, Marty Panzer, Traditional) - 4:47

== Personnel ==
- Barry Manilow – vocals
- Randy Kerber – acoustic piano, synthesizers
- Eddie Arkin – guitars, orchestral arrangements
- Russ Freeman – rhythm guitar (3)
- John Patitucci – bass
- Vinnie Colaiuta – drums
- Gene Estes – vibraphone
- Alan Estes – additional percussion (3)
- Jerry Hey – trumpet solos, brass arrangements
- Mark Watters – orchestral conductor
- Sandy De Crescent – orchestral contractor
- Karen Smith – music copyist
- Exposé – vocals (3)
- K.T. Oslin – vocals (6)

=== Production ===
- Barry Manilow – producer, arrangements
- Eddie Arkin – producer, arrangements
- Don Murray – recording (1–3, 5–10), mixing (1–3, 5–10)
- Allen Sides – recording (4), mixing (4)
- Mike Kloster – assistant engineer
- Robert Vosgien – digital editing at CMS Digital (Pasadena, California)
- Wally Traugott – mastering at Capitol Studios
- Carolyn Quan – art direction, design
- Greg Gorman – photography
- Oates Set Design – set design
- Alfonso Noe – hair, make-up
- Martine Leger – wardrobe styling
- Stiletto Management – management

== Certifications ==
| Region | Certification | Certified units/sales |
|---|---|---|
| United States (RIAA) | Platinum | 1,000,000^{^} |
^{^} Shipments figures based on certification alone.
