= Barry Manilow (1989 album) =

Studio album by Barry Manilow
- Released: May 2, 1989
- Recorded: 1988–89
- Studio: The Village Recorder, West LA Music, The Complex, Image Recording Studios and Westlake Audio (Los Angeles, California); Conway Studios (Hollywood, California); Ground Control Studios (Burbank, California); Can-Am Recorders (Tarzana, California); Somis Recording (Somis, California); Cove City Sound Studios (Long Island, New York); Marathon Studios and Shakedown Sound Studios (New York City, New York); The Manor Studio (Oxfordshire, UK); Little Yard Studio, Sarm West Studios and Angel Recording Studios (London, UK)
- Genre: Pop; Easy listening
- Length: 49:41
- Label: Arista
- Producer: Barry Manilow; Eddie Arkin; Michael Lloyd; Paul Staveley O'Duffy; Hammer & Slater; Ric Wake

Barry Manilow chronology
| Swing Street (1987) | Barry Manilow (1989) | Live on Broadway (1990) |

Professional ratings
Review scores
| Source | Rating |
|---|---|
| Allmusic | 4/5 stars |
| Chicago Tribune | 2/4 stars |
| Hi-Fi News & Record Review | A/B:1/2 |
| Los Angeles Times | 3/5 stars |
| The Rolling Stone Album Guide | 1.5/5 stars |

Barry Manilow is a studio album released by singer and songwriter Barry Manilow in 1989. It was Manilow's thirteenth studio album overall and second studio album on his second tenure with Arista Records. The album represented a hint of future album releases in that many of the songs were not written/co-written by Manilow, which until that point had been rare for him. After the release of this album, Manilow embarked on introducing contemporary audiences to pop music of the 1930s through the late 1940s.

The singles from this album were: "Keep Each Other Warm", "The One That Got Away", "Please Don't Be Scared" and "When the Good Times Come Again", which hit #12 on the Billboard Adult Contemporary chart in June 2020 in the wake of the COVID-19 pandemic. No singles from the album reached the Billboard Hot 100, but "Keep Each Other Warm" and "The One That Got Away" made the AC chart at #7 and #25 respectively in 1989.

== Track listing ==
=== Side 1 ===
1. "Please Don't Be Scared" (Mindy Sterling) - 5:34
2. "Keep Each Other Warm" (Andy Hill, Peter Sinfield) - 4:33
3. "Once and For All" (Jimmy Webb) - 4:15
4. "The One That Got Away" (Wayne Hammer, Jeff Slater)- 3:55
5. "When the Good Times Come Again" (music: Richard Kerr; lyrics: Will Jennings) - 4:29

=== Side 2 ===
1. "Some Good Things Never Last" (Mark Radice) - 4:47
2. "In Another World" (music: Richard Kerr; lyrics: Charlie Dore) - 4:12
3. "You Begin Again" (music: Barry Manilow; lyrics: Adrienne Anderson) - 3:59
4. "My Moonlight Memories of You" (Sandy Linzer, Irwin Levine) - 4:43
5. "Anyone Can Do the Heartbreak" (music: Tom Snow; lyrics: Amanda McBroom) - 4:22
6. "A Little Travelling Music, Please" (music: Barry Manilow; lyrics: Bruce Sussman, Jack Feldman) - 4:23

== Personnel ==
- Barry Manilow – vocals, acoustic piano (5), arrangements (11)
- Pat Coil – acoustic piano (1)
- Michael Lloyd – strings (1), arrangements (1, 3, 5, 7, 9, 10), acoustic piano (3, 5, 7), synthesizers (3, 5, 7, 9, 10)
- Paul "Wix" Wickens – keyboards (2)
- Martyn Phillips – programming (2)
- Wayne Hammer – synthesizer programming (4), drum programming (4), backing vocals (4), arrangements (4)
- Jeff Slater – keyboards (4), synthesizer programming (4), bass (4), drum programming (4), backing vocals (4), arrangements (4)
- Todd Herreman – Fairlight CMI (4)
- Ben Forat – F-16 programming (4)
- Claude Gaudette – synthesizers (5, 7, 10)
- Rich Tancredi – keyboards (6), arrangements (6)
- Eddie Arkin – keyboard and synthesizer programming (8, 11), arrangements (8, 11), symphony introduction (11)
- Reg Powell – acoustic piano (9)
- Jim Cox – acoustic piano (10)
- Kevin Bassinson – acoustic piano (11)
- Dean Parks – guitars (1, 7, 10)
- Robbie McIntosh – guitars (2)
- Laurence Juber – guitars (3, 9), synthesizers (9), ukulele (9), additional orchestrations (9)
- Steve Dudas – guitars (5)
- Dann Huff – guitars (8)
- Russ Freeman – guitars (11)
- Dennis Belfield – bass (1, 3, 7, 9, 10)
- Paul Leim – drums (1, 7, 9, 10)
- Vinnie Colaiuta – drums (4)
- Ron Krasinski – drums (5)
- Joey Franco – drums (6)
- Michael Fisher – percussion (1, 3, 5, 7, 9, 10)
- Luís Jardim – percussion (2)
- Dana Robbins – saxophone (4, 6)
- Gary Herbig – saxophone (7)
- David Bedford – string arrangements (2)
- Paul Staveley O'Duffy – string arrangements (2)
- Isobel Griffiths – orchestra booking (2)
- Paul Bateman – choir master (2)
- John D'Andrea – additional orchestrations (3, 7, 9)
- Ric Wake – arrangements (6)
- Dee Lewis – backing vocals (2)
- Joe Chemay – backing vocals (10)
- Jim Haas – backing vocals (10)
- Joe Pizzulo – backing vocals (10)

== Production ==
- Clive Davis – executive producer
- Eric Borenstein – co-executive producer
- Michael Lloyd – producer (1, 3, 5, 7, 9, 10)
- Paul Staveley O'Duffy – producer (2)
- Hammer & Slater – producers (4)
- Ric Wake – producer (6)
- Eddie Arkin – producer (8, 11)
- Barry Manilow – producer (8, 11)
- Debbie Lytton – production coordinator (1, 3, 5, 7, 9, 10)
- David Barratt – production coordinator (6)
- Marc Hulett – production manager
- Susan Mendola – art direction
- Greg Gorman – photography
- Martine Leger – stylist
- Eric Barnard – grooming

Technical

- Mike Fuller – digital mastering at Fullersound (Miami, Florida)
- Carmine Rubino – engineer (1, 3, 5, 7, 9, 10), mixing (1, 3, 5, 7, 9, 10)
- Michael Lloyd – engineer (1, 3, 5, 7, 9, 10), mixing (1, 3, 5, 7, 9, 10)
- Dan Nebenzal – engineer (1, 3, 5, 7, 9, 10), mixing (1, 3, 5, 7, 9, 10)
- Don Griffin – musical instruments recording (1, 3, 5, 7, 9, 10)
- Paul Staveley O'Duffy – engineer (2)
- Dennis Mackay – engineer (4)
- Mick Guzauski – mixing (4)
- Bob Cadway – engineer (6), recording (6), mixing (6)
- Michael DeLugg – engineer (8), mixing (8)
- Stephen Krause – engineer (11), mixing (11)
- John Valentino – assistant engineer (1, 3, 5, 7, 9, 10)
- Charlie Brocco – mix assistant (1, 9)
- Robert Hart – mix assistant (3, 5)
- Squeak Stone – assistant engineer (4)
- Sam Gladstein – second assistant engineer (4)
- Richard McKernan – assistant mix engineer (4)
- Robert "Void" Caprio – assistant engineer (6)
- Thomas R. Yeszi – assistant engineer (6)
- Jeff Poe – mix assistant (7, 10)

== Certifications ==
| Region | Certification | Certified units/sales |
|---|---|---|
| United Kingdom (BPI) | Silver | 60,000^{^} |
^{^} Shipments figures based on certification alone.
