= 15 Minutes (Barry Manilow album) =

Studio album by Barry Manilow
- Released: June 14, 2011
- Recorded: 2011
- Studio: The Studio (Beverly Hills, California); Pepper Tree Studios (Palm Springs, California); The Complex (Los Angeles, California)
- Genre: Easy Listening, Pop, Rock opera
- Length: 52:47
- Label: Stiletto Entertainment
- Producer: Barry Manilow; Michael Lloyd; Scott Erickson; Greg Bartheld

Barry Manilow chronology
The Greatest Love Songs of All Time (2010)	15 Minutes (2011)	Night Songs (2014)

15 Minutes is the twenty-eighth studio album by American singer-songwriter Barry Manilow. It was released on June 14, 2011, by Stiletto Entertainment.

== Background ==
The album was the first independent release of Manilow's career, through his Stiletto Entertainment label (distributed by Fontana/Universal Music). In interviews around the time of the release, Manilow said that his long-time friend and mentor, Clive Davis, had told him that he could not sell an album of Manilow performing any new Manilow songs now, given the string of great albums covering other artists' songs Manilow released in the 1990s and 2000s. But Manilow thought he could still be relevant as a songwriter too. This led to his second departure from Arista and the decision to go independent.

The majority of the songs were co-written with longtime lyricist Enoch Anderson, with one song, "Wine Song," co-written with another longtime lyricist, Adrienne Anderson.

== Critical reception ==
Professional ratings
Review scores
Source	Rating
AllMusic	3.5/5 stars

AllMusic's Stephen Thomas Erlewine wrote that Manilow "not only rides a tightly wound drum loop on "Work the Room", but he also raps, a development nearly as disconcerting as the cuss he slips into its chorus." 15 Minutes offers something "unexpected", he added. At the end of his review, Erlewine noted that Manilow is "trying hard to deliver serious, sharply crafted pop, and even if the album doesn't entirely work, it's hard not to give him considerable credit for his ambition."

== Awards ==
15 Minutes won Manilow a Best Traditional Pop Vocal Album Grammy Award nomination in 2012.

== Commercial performance ==
The album debuted on the Billboard 200 album chart at its peak position of number 7, his first studio album of mostly original songs to crack the Top 10 since 1979's One Voice.

It also debuted on the UK Albums Chart at its peak of number 20. In Canada, the album reached number 36 on the Canadian Albums Chart.

== Track listing ==
All songs written by Barry Manilow and Enoch Anderson, except where noted.

15 Minutes track listing
No.	Title	Writer(s)	Length
1.	"15 Minutes"		3:33
2.	"Work the Room"		3:12
3.	"Bring On Tomorrow"		3:55
4.	"Now It's for Real"		3:36
5.	"Wine Song"	Manilow, Adrienne Anderson	3:48
6.	"He's a Star"		3:42
7.	"Written In Stone"		4:52
8.	"Letter from a Fan / So Heavy, So High" (featuring Nataly Dawn)		5:21
9.	"Everybody's Leavin'"	Manilow	0:38
10.	"Who Needs You"		3:24
11.	"Winner Go Down"		4:51
12.	"Slept Through the End of the World"		3:34
13.	"Reflection"	Manilow	0:43
14.	"Trainwreck"		3:13
15.	"15 Minutes (Reprise)"		1:10
16.	"Everything's Gonna Be All Right"		3:17

== Personnel ==
- Barry Manilow – vocals, backing vocals, keyboards, programming, bass, orchestra arrangements (3)
- Michael Lloyd – keyboards, programming, guitars, bass, backing vocals
- Jim Cox – keyboards
- Matt Rawlings – keyboards
- Scott Erickson – additional programming (3), orchestra arrangements (3)
- Laurence Juber – guitars
- Tim Pierce – guitars
- Mike Lent – agitated guitar break (8)
- Matt Bissonette – bass
- Gregg Bissonette – drums
- M.B. Gordy – basic track drums (8)
- Kye Brackett – backing vocals
- Randy Crenshaw – backing vocals
- Ron Dante – backing vocals
- Carmen Echols – backing vocals
- Muffy Hendrix – backing vocals
- Judith Hill – backing vocals
- Navanna Holley – backing vocals
- Melanie Nyema – backing vocals
- Bill Cantos – backing vocals
- Keely Vasquez – backing vocals
- Nataly Dawn – vocals (8)

== Production ==
- Garry C. Kief – executive producer, management
- Barry Manilow – producer, arrangements, recording
- Michael Lloyd – producer, arrangements, recording, overdub engineer, mixing
- Scott Erickson – producer (3)
- Greg Bartheld – producer (8), basic track recording (8)
- Marc Hulett – associate producer
- Bob Kearney – tracking engineer
- Jason Doser – second engineer (8)
- Nigel Lendemo – digital editing
- George Leger III – digital editing
- Dave Collins – mastering at Dave Collins Mastering (Hollywood, California)
- John Adams – project manager
- Jason Irwin – art direction
- Sara Zickhur – art direction
- Colin Davis – original art
- James Jensen Studio – original art

== Charts ==
Chart performance for 15 Minutes
Chart (2011)	Peak position
Scottish Albums (OCC)	46
UK Albums (OCC)	20
US Billboard 200	7
US Independent Albums (Billboard)	2
