= The Greatest Songs of the Fifties =

Studio album by Barry Manilow
- Released: January 31, 2006
- Studio: Ocean Way Recording and A&M Studios (Hollywood, California); Schnee Studios (North Hollywood, California); Chalice Recording Studios and Peppertree Studios (Los Angeles, California); O'Henry Sound Studios (Burbank, California); Digital Insight Recording Studios (Las Vegas, Nevada)
- Genre: Pop; easy listening
- Length: 39:48
- Label: Arista
- Producer: Barry Manilow; Clive Davis; David Benson

Barry Manilow chronology
The Essential Barry Manilow (2005)	The Greatest Songs of the Fifties (2006)	The Greatest Songs of the Sixties (2006)

Professional ratings
Review scores
Source	Rating
Allmusic	3/5 stars

The Greatest Songs of the Fifties is an album by American singer Barry Manilow, released in the United States on January 31, 2006. A significant album for Manilow, it finds the Brooklyn-born crooner taking on songs that were popular in his youth. The project also marked Manilow's return to his former label, Arista, with the company's founder, Clive Davis, setting the singer up with 1950s pop classics much in the way that he steered Rod Stewart in the direction of jazzy standards in his successful The Great American Songbook project.

The album was a hit in the United States. It entered the Billboard 200 at No. 1, giving him the second chart-topping album of his career. His only other No. 1 album was Barry Manilow Live, in 1977. This is also the highest-debuting album of his career, selling over 150,000 copies in its opening week and besting the No. 3 opening of Ultimate Manilow in 2002.

== Track listing ==
=== US Version ===
1. "Moments to Remember" - 3:34
2. "It's All in the Game" - 2:54
3. "Unchained Melody" - 3:45
4. "Venus" - 2:26
5. "It's Not for Me to Say" - 3:23
6. "Love Is a Many Splendored Thing" - 2:42
7. "Rags to Riches" - 3:21
8. "Sincerely/Teach Me Tonight (Medley)" (Duet with Phyllis McGuire) - 3:18
9. "Are You Lonesome Tonight?" - 2:57
10. "Young at Heart" - 3:35
11. "All I Have to Do Is Dream" - 2:48
12. "What a Diff'rence a Day Made" - 3:03
13. "Beyond the Sea" - 4:05

=== UK Version ===
1. "Moments to Remember" - 3:34
2. "It's All in the Game" - 2:54
3. "Unchained Melody" - 3:45
4. "Venus" - 2:26
5. "It's Not for Me to Say" - 3:23
6. "Love Is a Many Splendored Thing" - 2:42
7. "Rags to Riches" - 3:21
8. "Sincerely/Teach Me Tonight (Medley)" (Duet with Phyllis McGuire) - 3:18
9. "Are You Lonesome Tonight?" - 2:57
10. "Young at Heart" - 3:35
11. "All I Have to Do Is Dream" - 2:48
12. "What a Diff'rence a Day Made" - 3:03
13. "Beyond the Sea" - 4:05
14. "If You Love Me (Really Love Me)" - 3:49
15. "As Time Goes By" - 3:45

=== Japanese Version ===
1. "Moments to Remember" - 3:34
2. "It's All in the Game" - 2:54
3. "Unchained Melody" - 3:45
4. "Venus" - 2:26
5. "It's Not for Me to Say" - 3:23
6. "Love Is a Many Splendored Thing" - 2:42
7. "Rags to Riches" - 3:21
8. "Sincerely/Teach Me Tonight (Medley)" (Duet with Hiromi Iwasaki) - 3:18
9. "Are You Lonesome Tonight?" - 2:57
10. "Young at Heart" - 3:35
11. "All I Have to Do Is Dream" - 2:48
12. "What a Diff'rence a Day Made" - 3:03
13. "Beyond the Sea" - 4:05
14. "Have I Told You Lately" - 4:17

== Personnel ==
Vocalists and Musicians

- Barry Manilow – vocals, acoustic piano, song layout arrangements, arrangements (3)
- Joe Melotti – acoustic piano
- Ron Pedley – acoustic piano
- Steve Welch – acoustic piano
- Walter Afanasieff – keyboards (3), rhythm programming (3), arrangements (3)
- Emanuel Kiriakou – programming (3)
- Mike Schroffel – additional programming (3)
- Ken Berry – guitars
- Mike Lent – guitars
- Michael Landau – guitars (3)
- Dave Carpenter – bass
- Dave Stone – bass
- Russ McKinnon – drums
- John Robinson – drums
- Dan Greco – percussion
- Tommy Morgan – harmonica
- Randy Crenshaw – backing vocals, vocal contractor
- Jon Joyce – backing vocals
- Gary Stockdale – backing vocals
- Connie Nassios – heavenly choir (4)
- Phyllis McGuire – vocals (8)
- Ken Welch – vocal arrangements (8)
- Mitzie Welch – vocal arrangements (8)

Orchestra

- Kevin Bassinson – arrangements and conductor (1, 6, 10)
- Doug Walter – arrangements and conductor (2, 8, 9)
- William Ross – arrangements and conductor (3)
- Ken Berry – arrangements and conductor (4, 11)
- Artie Butler – arrangements and conductor (5)
- Jonathan Barrack Griffiths – horn conductor (6)
- Larry Blank – arrangements and conductor (7)
- Ray Ellis – arrangements and conductor (12)
- Jorge Calandrelli – arrangements and conductor (13)
- Joe Soldo – contractor
- Assa Drori – concertmaster

Brass and Woodwinds

- Gene Cipriano, Gary Foster, Dan Higgins, Greg Huckins, George Shelby and Don Shelton – saxophones, woodwinds
- John Mitchell – bassoon
- Dave Shostac and Sheridan Stokes – flute
- Earl Dumler and Joe Stone – oboe
- Steve Baxter, Bryant Byers, Craig Gosnell, Charles Loper and Chauncey Welsch – trombone
- Wayne Bergeron, Charles Davis, Chris Gray, Warren Leuning, Larry Lunetta and Larry McGuire – trumpet
- Mark Adams, Jim Atkinson, Steve Becknell, Paul Klintworth, Danielle Ondarza and Brad Warnaar – French horn

Strings

- Larry Corbett, Vanessa Freebairn-Smith, Stephanie Fife, Rowena Hammill, Paula Hochhalter, John Krovoza, Christina Soule and David Speltz – celli
- Marcia Dickstein and Gayle Levant – harp
- Caroline Buckman, Ken Burward-Hoy, Miguel Ferguson, Sam Formicola, Carrie Holzman, Rodney Hurtz, Kazi Pitelka, Harry Shirinian and Ray Tischer – viola
- Brian Benning, Charlie Bisharat, Rebecca Bunnell, Ron Clark, Kevin Connolly, Mario DeLeon, Yvette Devereaux, Assa Drori, Ronald Folsom, Armen Garabedian, Neel Hammond, Johanna Krejci, Liane Mautner, Cynthia Moussas, Jennifer Munday, Alyssa Park, Barbra Porter, Tereza Stanislav, David Stenske, Yan To, Olivia Tsui, Irina Voloshina, Jennifer Walton, Dynell Weber, Margaret Wooten and Shari Zippert – violin

== Production ==
- Garry C. Kief – executive producer, management
- Steve Ferrera – A&R
- Barry Manilow – producer
- Clive Davis – producer
- David Benson – producer, additional recording
- Marc Hulett – associate producer
- Greg Bartheld – associate producer, additional recording, editing, Pro Tools programming
- Bruce Botnick – recording
- Emanuel Kiriakou – recording (3), Pro Tools engineer (3)
- David Reitzas – recording (3)
- Bill Schnee – mixing, additional recording
- Don Murray – additional recording
- Koji Egawa – additional recording, editing, Pro Tools programming
- Adam Olmstead – additional engineer (3)
- Mike Schroffel – additional engineer (3)
- David Channing – additional Pro Tools engineer (3)
- Jeff Burns – assistant engineer
- Darius Fong – assistant engineer
- Robert Hadley – mastering at The Mastering Lab (Hollywood, California)
- Marsha Burns – production manager
- Andrew MacPherson – photography
- Alexis Yraola – art direction, design

== Charts ==
=== Weekly charts ===
Chart (2006)	Peak position
Australian Albums (ARIA)	36
Belgian Albums (Ultratop Flanders)	17
Irish Albums (IRMA)	58
Scottish Albums (OCC)	23
UK Albums (OCC)	12
US Billboard 200	1

=== Year-end charts ===
Chart (2006)	Position
US Billboard 200	55

== Certifications ==
Region	Certification	Certified units/sales
United Kingdom (BPI)	Gold	100,000^{^}
^{^} Shipments figures based on certification alone.
