= Young at Heart (Johnny Richards and Carolyn Leigh song) =

1954 pop standard ballad

Song by Frank Sinatra
- Published: 1953 by Sunbeam Music
- Released: January 1954
- Recorded: December 1953
- Genre: Traditional pop, vocal pop
- Label: Capitol Records
- Composer: Johnny Richards
- Lyricist: Carolyn Leigh

"Young at Heart" is a pop standard ballad with music by Johnny Richards and lyrics by Carolyn Leigh.

== Development and first release ==
The song was written and published in 1953, with Leigh contributing the lyrics to what was originally a Richards instrumental called "Moonbeam". Frank Sinatra was the first performer to record the song, which became a million-selling hit in late 1953 (and spilling over with popularity into 1954) where it reached the No. 2 spot in the Billboard chart.

The song was such a hit that a movie Sinatra was filming at the same time with Doris Day was renamed to match the song title, and the song was included in the opening and closing credits of the movie.

== Recordings ==
Although Frank Sinatra was the first performer to record the song, many other performers who have recorded versions of "Young at Heart," including:

- Bing Crosby (charting briefly in 1954 at the number 24 spot)
- Rosemary Clooney (on her album While We're Young)
- Perry Como (on his 1960 album For the Young at Heart)
- Connie Francis (1961)
- Jimmy Durante (1963)
- Tony Bennett
- Shawn Colvin
- Val Doonican
- Bobby Vinton
- Tom Waits
- Barry Manilow (on his album The Greatest Songs of the Fifties)
- Bob Dylan
- Gloria Estefan
- Landon Pigg
- Mark Vincent and Vonda Shepard
- James Darren
- Monty Alexander
- Brad Mehldau (on his 1998 album Songs: The Art of the Trio Volume Three)
- Michael Bublé (on his album To Be Loved)
- Willie Nelson (on his 2018 album My Way)
- Donald Duck (Tony Anselmo)
- Richard Marx (on his 2026 album After Hours)

On the 1988 TV Special, Magic in the Magic Kingdom, George Burns, 92, sang "Young at Heart" during a musical break. In 2016, at age 90, Dick Van Dyke recorded a duet with his wife, Arlene, at Capitol Records Studio in Los Angeles, filmed for the HBO special on aging If You're Not in the Obit, Eat Breakfast, starring Carl Reiner and featuring Mel Brooks, Norman Lear, Stan Lee, Betty White and others over 90 years old. Van Dyke was recorded using Frank Sinatra's microphone.

Wild Man Fischer recorded an eccentric version that was included on The Rhino Brothers Present the World's Worst Records.

The Frank Sinatra version was used in the closing scene and credits of Episode 7 of Season 2 of the Amazon Prime series Gen V (2025).

The song has also been used on the soundtracks of other films, including

- The Front (1976)
- Sweet Dreams (1985)
- City Slickers (1991) (Jimmy Durante version)
- It Could Happen to You (1994),
- Space Cowboys (2000) (in a rendition by Willie Nelson)
- 2016 Summer Olympics featurette from Gatorade

The Cure incorporated verses from "Young at Heart" during concert performances of "Why Can't I Be You?" (widely available on bootlegs).
