= Greg O'Connor =

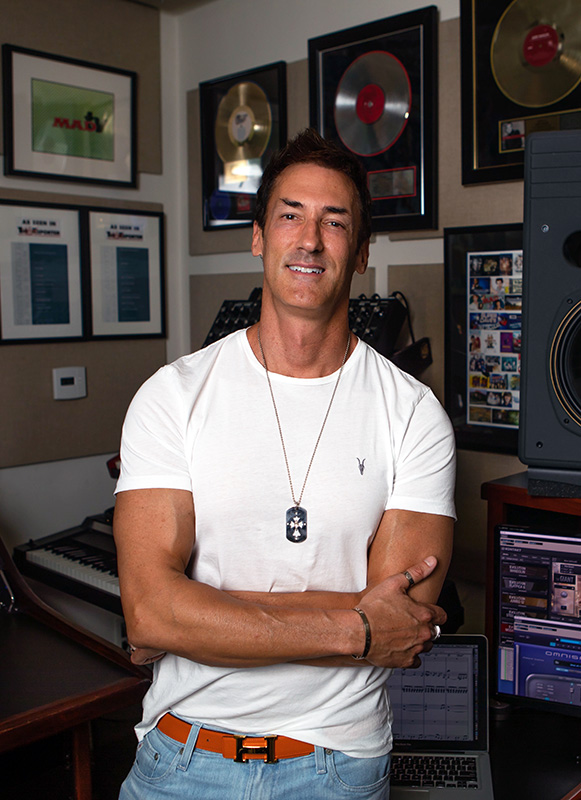

Background information
- Born: Gregory Joseph O'Connor; May 27, 1967 (age 59); Philadelphia, Pennsylvania, U.S.
- Occupations: Composer; songwriter; producer
- Instruments: Keyboards; saxophone; vocals
- Years active: 1990–present
- Awards: 2006 - Primetime Emmy Award for Outstanding Original Music and Lyrics, for "A Wonderfully Normal Day" - MADtv; 2007 - BMI Film and TV Award - MADtv

Gregory Joseph O'Connor (born May 27, 1967) is an American composer and songwriter. He has composed scores for over 30 television series and has written numerous featured songs for television, films, and commercials. He is a Primetime Emmy winner and a four-time Emmy nominee. He has scored projects including variety, single-camera comedy, multi-camera comedy, animation, one-hour drama, game show, sketch comedy, award show, stand-up, reality, hidden camera, documentary, and virtual reality.

== Early life ==
O'Connor was born in Philadelphia, Pennsylvania. He is a graduate of the University of Notre Dame’s Department of Music, as well as the "Scoring for Motion Pictures and Television" program at USC. He began studying music at age six, taking piano lessons at the Bryn Mawr Conservatory of Music in Bryn Mawr, Pennsylvania, a suburb of Philadelphia. He also played alto saxophone for eight years. His education included performing in various ensembles as a pianist, saxophonist, or vocalist, including concert band, jazz band, glee club, and various top 40 bands throughout high school and college.

== Career ==
=== 1990s ===
Early in his career, O'Connor scored the Emmy Award-winning Ben Stiller Show and The Sunday Comics on FOX.

==== Chicago ====
In 1993, O'Connor co-wrote the song "Here with Me (A Candle in the Dark)" for the Chicago album Stone of Sisyphus, which was unreleased until 2008. He has written and produced other songs for Chicago, including “Firecracker” and “Someone Needed Me the Most” from their 2022 album Born for this Moment. He also co-wrote the songs "The Only One" and “Show Me a Sign" with James Pankow from their 1997 and 1998 compilation albums The Heart of Chicago 1967–1997 and The Heart of Chicago 1967–1998 Volume II. Both songs reached the top 20 on the Billboard Adult Contemporary charts.

==== MADtv ====
In 1995, O'Connor became the musical director and composer for all 15 seasons of the sketch comedy show MADtv, produced by David Salzman and Quincy Jones. In 2006, 2007, and 2008, he was nominated for a Primetime Emmy Award as a composer for MADtv, and won in 2006 for Outstanding Original Music and Lyrics. The songs that were nominated include "Sad Fitty Cent," co-written with Academy Award-winning filmmaker Jordan Peele. He also won a BMI Film and TV Award for his work on the show in 2007. He would go on to work with MADtv cast members on their own projects, including Will Sasso’s Ten Minute Podcast and Frank Caliendo's The Caliendo Cast. He also composed songs for Emmy-winning actress Alex Borstein.

=== 2000s ===
In 2002, O'Connor composed the underscore for all three seasons of the hidden camera series The Jamie Kennedy Experiment, as well as for the cop drama 10-8: Officers on Duty in 2003, starring Ernie Hudson and Danny Nucci. He was the musical director and composer for the ABC reality competition series The Next Best Thing, which aired for one season in 2007. O'Connor co-produced and arranged the song "Christmas Is Just Around the Corner" from Barry Manilow's 2007 album In the Swing of Christmas. He also co-produced five songs on Manilow's album The Greatest Songs of the Eighties in 2008. That same year, he wrote and produced three featured songs for Lori Petty’s directorial feature film debut, The Poker House. He also composed music for award-winning comedian David Alan Grier's Chocolate News.

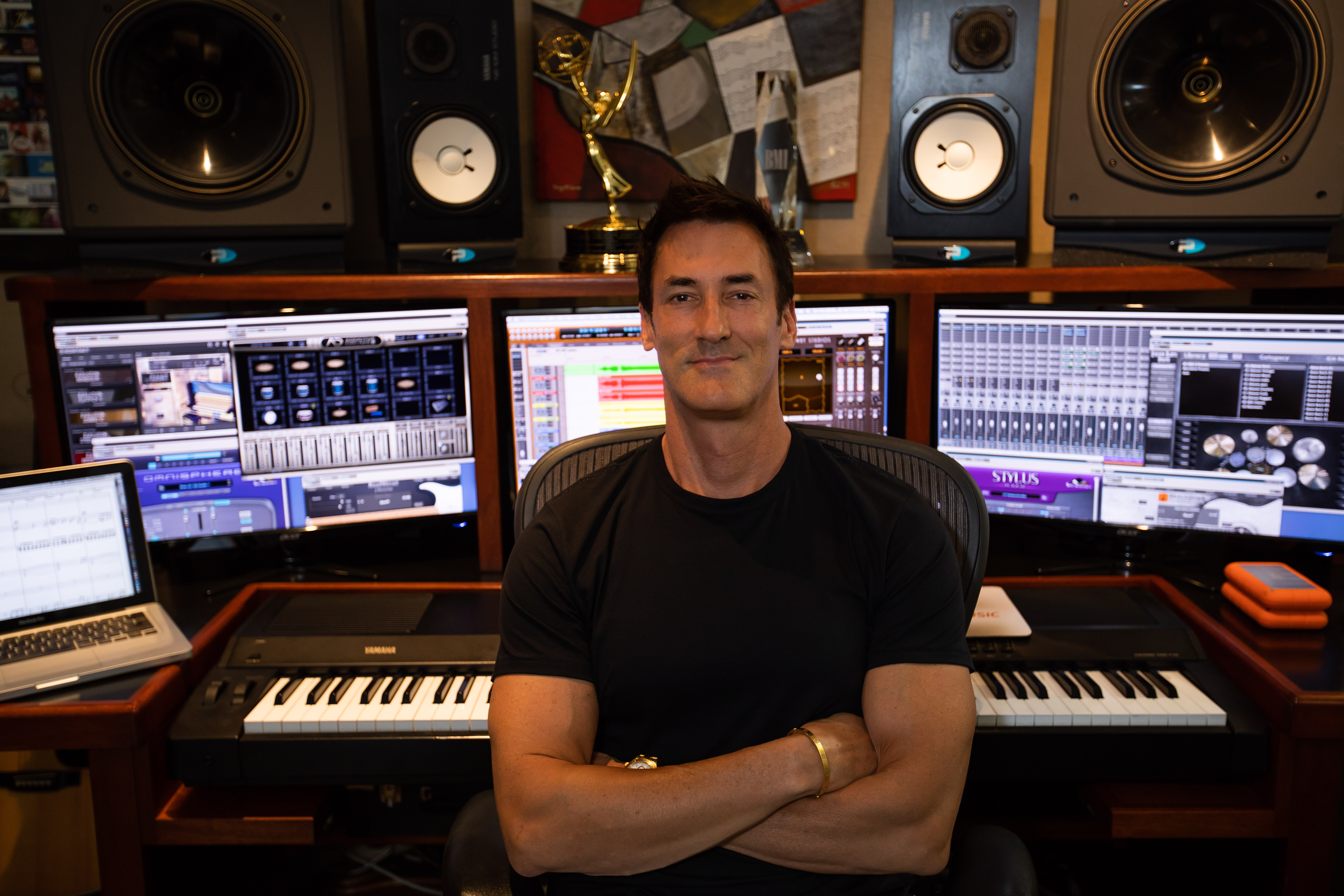
O'Connor in his home studio.

=== 2010s ===
In 2010, O'Connor composed, produced, and sang two songs for the animated film LEGO: The Adventures of Clutch Powers. In 2011, he wrote and produced two songs for the film The Greening of Whitney Brown, starring Kris Kristofferson, Aidan Quinn, and Brooke Shields, one of which was performed by Shields. In 2012, he produced and composed songs for the Lionsgate animated film Foodfight! He also produced two songs for Oscar-winning producer Al Ruddy, performed by Kimberley Locke on the soundtrack of the 2008 film Camille. In 2016, he composed the opening theme songs for the ABC series Greatest Hits, produced by Grammy Awards producer Ken Ehrlich. He also composed the theme song for the series Gay Skit Happens, with two members of Pentatonix. In 2019, he scored the TV short Defrost: The Virtual Series, directed by Randal Kleiser and starring Bruce Davison, Harry Hamlin, and Tanna Frederick.

=== 2020s ===
In 2020, O'Connor wrote the featured “Laura Dern” song for the 35th Film Independent Spirit Awards, which instantly went viral and was featured in many major publications and news outlets. He also composed the main title theme for the Disney+ series Prop Culture. He scored the animated feature film Bobbleheads: The Movie for Universal Pictures, starring Cher, Jennifer Coolidge, Brenda Song, and Luke Wilson. In 2023, he composed the score and featured songs for the film drama My Home Unknown, produced by Lawrence Kasanoff. He also composed the company logo music for Kasanoff's Threshold Entertainment, as well as for Academy Awards producer Rob Paine's House of Paine Entertainment.

== Notable credits ==
Television
Year	Title	Network	Credit(s)
1992	The Ben Stiller Show	FOX	Composer, cast (Springsteen band pianist)
1992	The Sunday Comics	FOX	Composer
1993	Bakersfield P.D.	FOX	Composer
1994	Project Time	Disney	Composer
1994	Sports Illustrated 1994 Swimsuit Issue Video	WarnerVision / Dakota	Composer
1994	Trashed	MTV	Composer
1995	MADtv	FOX	Composer, music director, cast (various roles)
1995	1995 Young Comedians Special	HBO	Composer (theme)
1996	Comedy Central Canned Ham: The Cable Guy	HBO	Composer
1999	HBO Workspace	HBO	Composer (theme)
2000	My Funny Valentine	AMC	Composer
2001	Gary & Mike	UPN	Composer
2002	The Jamie Kennedy Experiment	The WB	Composer
2003	10–8: Officers on Duty	ABC	Composer
2003	2003 Primetime Creative Arts Emmy Awards	E!	Composer (opening song)
2003	Queens Supreme	CBS	Composer (theme)
2004	Blue Collar TV	The WB	Composer
2004	He's a Lady	TBS	Composer
2004	The Mansion	TBS	Composer (theme)
2005	The Starlet	The WB	Composer
2006	Jacob and Joshua: Nemesis Rising	Logo TV	Composer (theme), cast (record producer)
2006	The Big Gay Sketch Show	Logo TV	Composer
2007	The Next Best Thing	ABC	Composer
2008	Chocolate News	Comedy Central	Composer, cast (church piano player)
2008	The Capture of the Green River Killer	Lifetime	Producer (songs)
2009	Super Dave Spike-Tacular	Spike	Composer
2016	Gay Skit Happens	Logo TV	Composer
2016	Greatest Hits	ABC	Composer (theme)
2016	MADtv 20th Anniversary Reunion	The CW	Composer
2020	35th Film Independent Spirit Awards	IFC	Composer (song: "Gay Spirit")
2020	Prop Culture	Disney+	Composer (theme)

Film
Year	Title	Producer	Credit(s)
1994	Mona Must Die	MMD Productions	Composer
1994	Reality Bites	Universal Pictures / Jersey Films	Composer (additional music)
1994	Timecop	Universal Pictures / Largo Entertainment	Producer (songs)
1995	Get Shorty	MGM/UA / Jersey Films	Composer (additional music)
2008	Camille	A-Mark Entertainment	Producer (songs, additional music)
2008	The Poker House	Phase 4 Films	Composer, producer (songs)
2010	LEGO: The Adventures of Clutch Powers	Threshold Entertainment	Composer, producer (songs)
2011	The Greening of Whitney Brown	Perfect Weekend	Composer (songs, additional music), producer (songs)
2012	Foodfight!	Lionsgate	Composer, producer (songs)
2012	Holiday Spin	Mystique Films / Lifetime	Composer (dance music)
2015	Hoovey	Gundersen Entertainment / EchoLight Studios	Composer, producer (songs)
2016	A Sunday Horse	The Sunday Horse II	Composer, producer (songs)
2019	Defrost: The Virtual Series	Randal Kleiser Productions	Composer
2019	Grease XR	Randal Kleiser Productions	Composer
2020	Bobbleheads: The Movie	Universal Pictures / Threshold Entertainment	Composer, songwriter
2023	My Home Unknown	Lawrence Kasanoff / Threshold Entertainment	Composer, songwriter
2024	Baby Boomer Yearbook	Randal Kleiser Productions	Composer

== Awards ==
Year	Award	Project	Category	Result
2001	Primetime Emmy Awards	Gary & Mike - "Mole Folks Song"	Outstanding Original Music and Lyrics	Nominated
2006	Primetime Emmy Awards	MADtv - "A Wonderfully Normal Day"	Outstanding Original Music and Lyrics	Won
2007	BMI Film & TV Awards	MADtv	BMI Film & TV Awards	Won
2007	Primetime Emmy Awards	MADtv - "Merry Ex-Mas"	Outstanding Original Music and Lyrics	Nominated
2008	Primetime Emmy Awards	MADtv - "Sad Fitty Cent"	Outstanding Original Music and Lyrics	Nominated
