= Chuck Berghofer =

American jazz double bassist (born 1937)

- Born: Charles Curtis Berghofer; June 14, 1937 (age 89); Denver, Colorado, U.S.
- Genres: Jazz
- Occupation: Musician
- Instruments: Double bass, Electric bass

Charles Curtis Berghofer (born June 14, 1937) is an American double bassist and electric bassist, who has worked in jazz and as a session musician in the film industry for more than 60 years, including working on more than 400 movie soundtracks.

== Early life ==
Chuck Berghofer was born in Denver, Colorado, and moved with his family to Arcadia, California when he was eight. With a lineage of musicians in the family (his grandfather had played with John Philip Sousa, and his uncle played tuba with the Saint Louis Symphony), Berghofer took interest in music at an early age, playing trumpet at the age of eight. He also played the tuba in grade school and high school until moving to the double bass at the age of 18. As a young adult, as he began venturing out to jazz night clubs, he came to admire bassist Ralph Peña and was able to persuade Peña to take him on as a student.

According to Berghofer, he always felt as though his music was heavily influenced by Leroy Vinnegar, Paul Chambers and Ray Brown. He also admired the work of Scott LaFaro and told musician and journalist Gordon Jack, "The best soloist on the instrument was Red Mitchell ... I loved to hear him solo."

== Professional career ==
Two years after he took up the bass, Berghofer, joined an orchestra, led by Skinnay Ennis for a tour of the midwest and then joined with Bobby Troup. As his career progressed he eventually replaced his former tutor, Peña, in a duo with Pete Jolly, which later expanded into a trio with the addition of drummer Nick Martinis. In the 1960s he became a member of Shelly Manne's band, taking on a bassist position at Manne's night club Shelly's Manne-Hole, and had the opportunity to play alongside numerous leading jazz musicians of the era, including Jack Sheldon, Conte Candoli, Frank Rosolino, Rahsaan Roland Kirk and Philly Joe Jones. During this time, he also recorded with popular singers such as Elvis Presley and The Everly Brothers.

He was a member of the Abnuceals Emuukha Electric Symphony Orchestra around 1967 when Frank Zappa recorded the orchestral parts for Lumpy Gravy.

With his lengthy career in film, Berghofer was also quite accomplished as a house jazz musician. He formed a semi-regular house band at Donte's in Los Angeles with pianist Frank Strazzeri and drummer Nick Ceroli and was videotaped playing with Roger Kellaway and drummer Larry Bunker as they backed Zoot Sims. Among others he accompanied were Ray Charles, Bob Cooper, Ella Fitzgerald, Stan Getz, Peggy Lee, Shelly Manne, Gerry Mulligan, Art Pepper, Frank Rosolino, Seth MacFarlane, and Frank Sinatra.

In 2019, Berghofer, along with fellow Wrecking Crew members Don Randi and Don Peake and in conjunction with Denny Tedesco (producer and director of the 2008 film The Wrecking Crew), performed around the Los Angeles area with their The Wrecking Crew's Farewell to Glen Campbell live shows.

=== Film, television, and popular music ===
As Berghofer made his career as a jazz musician, he landed a prominent role recording with Nancy Sinatra in "These Boots Are Made For Walkin". He also worked on television with Glen Campbell, recorded with Frank Sinatra, and played with Barbra Streisand, in which they did a recording of Funny Lady. His extensive film work led to his being awarded in the mid-1980s the National Academy of Recording Arts and Sciences Award as the most valuable bass player for four consecutive years. In that decade he recorded with Mel Tormé and later recorded again with Sinatra on Duets. During his career, Berghofer has performed on over 400 movie soundtracks. Just a few of the films he has worked on include Rocky II (1979), The Majestic (2001), Sing (2016), and Clint Eastwood's Bird (1988). He also worked on such television shows as Barney Miller (on which he played the opening bassline), Charlie's Angels, The Carol Burnett Show, The Simpsons and Star Trek: Enterprise. His bassline on Barney Miller inspired Cliff Burton to learn how to play bass.

== Discography ==
With Christina Aguilera

- My Kind of Christmas (RCA Records, 2000)

With Paul Anka

- Songs Of December (Decca Records, 2012)

With India Arie

- Christmas with Friends (Motown, 2015)

With Hoyt Axton

- My Griffin Is Gone (Columbia, 1969)

With The Beach Boys

- Summer Days (And Summer Nights!!) (Capitol, 1965)
- Pet Sounds (Capitol, 1966)
- Smiley Smile (Capitol, 1967)

With George Benson

- Inspiration: A Tribute to Nat King Cole (Concord Records, 2013)

With Mary J. Blige

- Mary (MCA Records, 1999)
- A Mary Christmas (Verve, 2013)

With Debby Boone

- Reflections of Rosemary (Concord, 2005)

With Pat Boone

- Near (The Gold Label, 2010)

With Michael Bublé

- Call Me Irresponsible (Reprise Records, 2007)
- Christmas (Reprise Records, 2011)
- To Be Loved (Reprise Records, 2013)
- Love (Reprise Records, 2018)
- Higher (Reprise Records, 2022)

With Vanessa Carlton

- Be Not Nobody (A&M, 2002)

With Rosemary Clooney

- For the Duration (Concord Records, 1991)
- Still on the Road (Concord Records, 1994)
- Dedicated to Nelson (Concord Records, 1996)
- White Christmas (Concord Records, 1996)
- Brazil (Concord Records, 2000)

With Adam Cohen

- Adam Cohen (Columbia Records, 1998)

With Natalie Cole

- Stardust (Elektra Records, 1996)
- Still Unforgettable (Atco Records, 2008)

With Ry Cooder

- Jazz (Warner Bros., 1978)

With Rita Coolidge

- And So Is Love (Paddle Wheel, 2005)

With Bobby Darin

- Venice Blue (Capitol Records, 1965)

With Matt Dusk

- Back in Town (Decca Records, 2006)

With The Everly Brothers

- In Our Image (Warner Bros., 1966)
- The Everly Brothers Sing (Warner Bros., 1967)

With Rebecca Ferguson

- Lady Sings the Blues (RCA Records, 2015)

With Melody Gardot

- Sunset in the Blue (Decca Records, 2020)

With Vince Gill

- Breath of Heaven: A Christmas Collection (MCA Records, 1998)

With Josh Groban

- Stages (Reprise Records, 2015)

With Enrique Iglesias

- Cosas del Amor (Fonovisa, 1998)

With B. B. King and Diane Schuur

- Heart to Heart (GRP, 1994)

With Carole King

- A Holiday Carole (Concord, 2011)

With Jean King

- Sings for the In-Crowd (Hanna-Barbera, 1966)

With Irene Kral

- Wonderful Life (Mainstream, 1965)

With Diana Krall

- When I Look in Your Eyes (Verve Records, 1999)

With Peggy Lee

- In the Name of Love (Capitol, 1964)

With Love

- Forever Changes (Elektra, 1967)

With Seth MacFarlane

- No One Ever Tells You (Republic, 2015)

With Melissa Manchester

- If My Heart Had Wings (Atlantic Records, 1995)

With Barry Manilow

- Showstoppers (Arista, 1991)
- Manilow Sings Sinatra (Arista Records, 1998)
- A Christmas Gift of Love (Columbia, 2002)
- Scores (Concord, 2004)
- The Greatest Songs of the Sixties (Arista, 2006)
- The Greatest Songs of the Seventies (Arista, 2007)
- In the Swing of Christmas (Arista, 2007)
- The Greatest Love Songs of All Time (Arista, 2010)
- My Dream Duets (Columbia, 2014)
- This Is My Town: Songs of New York (Decca, 2017)

With Shelly Manne

- Live! Shelly Manne & His Men at the Manne-Hole (Contemporary, 1961)
- Shelly Manne & His Men Play Checkmate (Contemporary, 1961)

With Johnny Mathis

- Isn't It Romantic: The Standards Album (Columbia, 2005)

With Martina McBride

- It's the Holiday Season (Broken Bow Records, 2018)

With Paul McCartney

- Kisses on the Bottom (Hear Music, 2012)

With Carmen McRae

- Can't Hide Love (Blue Note, 1976)

With Bette Midler

- Bette Midler Sings the Rosemary Clooney Songbook (Columbia Records, 2003)

With Liza Minnelli

- Gently (Angel Records, 1996)

With Joni Mitchell

- Both Sides Now (Reprise Records, 2000)
- Travelogue (Nonesuch Records, 2002)

With Michael Nesmith

- The Wichita Train Whistle Sings (Dot Records, 1968)

With Tom Netherton

- Just As I Am (Word, 1976)

With Aaron Neville

- The Grand Tour (A&M Records, 1993)

With Steve Perry

- Traces (Fantasy, 2018)

With Ruth Price and Shelly Manne

- Ruth Price with Shelly Manne & His Men at the Manne-Hole (Contemporary, 1961)

With Frankie Randall

- Going The Frankie Randall Way! (RCA Victor, 1966)

With Della Reese

- Let Me in Your Life (People, 1973)

With Emitt Rhodes

- The American Dreams (A&M Records, 1970)

With Howard Roberts

- Whatever's Fair! (Capitol Records, 1966)

With Diana Ross

- Take Me Higher (Motown, 1995)

With Seal

- Standards (Decca Records, 2017)

With Jon Secada

- Secada (Virgin, 1997)

With Diane Schuur

- Love Songs (GRP, 1993)
- Music Is My Life (Atlantic Records, 1999)
- Friends for Schuur (Concord Records, 2000)
- Midnight (Concord Records, 2003)

With Blake Shelton

- Cheers, It's Christmas (Warner Bros. Records, 2012)

With Zoot Sims

- Quietly There: Zoot Sims Plays Johnny Mandel (Pablo, 1984)

With Frank Sinatra

- Strangers in the Night (Reprise, 1966)
- That's Life (Reprise, 1966)
- The World We Knew (Reprise, 1967)
- Cycles (Reprise, 1968)
- My Way (Reprise, 1968)
- A Man Alone (Reprise, 1969)
- Sinatra & Company (Reprise, 1971)
- Some Nice Things I've Missed (Reprise, 1974)
- Duets (Capitol, 1993)
- Duets II (Capitol, 1994)

With Nancy Sinatra

- Boots (Reprise Records, 1966)
- Sugar (Reprise Records, 1966)
- Nancy (Reprise Records, 1969)

With The Singers Unlimited

- Friends (Pausa, 1977)

With Keely Smith

- Keely Sings Sinatra (Concord, 2001)

With Rod Stewart

- Merry Christmas, Baby (Verve Records, 2012)

With Barbra Streisand

- The Movie Album (Columbia Records, 2003)
- What Matters Most (Columbia Records, 2011)
- Partners (Columbia Records, 2014)
- Encore: Movie Partners Sing Broadway (Columbia Records, 2016)

With Toni Tennille

- All of Me (Gaia Records, 1987)

With Mel Tormé

- Mel Tormé and the Marty Paich Dektette – Reunion (Concord, 1988)

With Sarah Vaughan

- Sarah Vaughan with Michel Legrand (Mainstream Records, 1972)

With Dionne Warwick

- Dionne Warwick Sings Cole Porter (Arista Records, 1990)

With Robbie Williams

- Swing When You're Winning (Chrysalis Records, 2001)

With Trisha Yearwood

- Let's Be Frank (Gwendolyn, 2018)

== Filmography ==
An incomplete list of his music and film credits.

== See also ==
- Jazz
- List of jazz bassists
- List of jazz musicians
