= Scores (album) =

Studio album by Barry Manilow
- Released: September 28, 2004
- Recorded: 2004
- Studio: Benson Studios (Los Angeles, California); Sunset Sound (Hollywood, California); O'Henry Sound Studios (Burbank, California); Peppertree Studios (Palm Springs, California)
- Genre: Musical, pop
- Length: 50:49
- Label: Concord
- Producer: Barry Manilow; Phil Ramone

Barry Manilow chronology
2 Nights Live! (2004)	Scores (2004)	The Essential Barry Manilow (2005)

Professional ratings
Review scores
Source	Rating
Allmusic	3/5 stars

Scores: Songs from "Copacabana" and "Harmony" is an album by Barry Manilow, released in 2004. It was his third album with Concord Records. It features selections from two musicals that feature original music by Manilow and lyrics by Bruce Sussman.

The first half of the record features songs from Copacabana: The Musical. "Dancin' Fool", "Sweet Heaven", and "Copacabana", which had been previously recorded and released, were re-recorded. "Who Needs To Dream" is a previously released song which was included on the soundtrack to the television version of Copacabana which starred Barry Manilow. And "This Can’t Be Real" is duet with Olivia Newton-John.

The second half of the album features songs from the Harmony: A New Musical based on a true story about the German singing group the Comedian Harmonists. The musical, with music by Manilow and book and lyrics by Sussman, had its world premiere at the La Jolla Playhouse and subsequent productions at the Alliance Theatre in Atlanta and the Ahmanson Theatre in Los Angeles. Its New York premiere was in March 2022 at National Yiddish Theatre Folksbiene. In April 2023 it was announced that the show will open on Broadway at the Ethel Barrymore Theater in October 2023.

== Track listing ==
=== Copacabana ===
(Music by Barry Manilow, Lyrics by Bruce Sussman and Jack Feldman)

1. "Just Arrived" – 3:59
2. "Dancin' Fool" – 2:40
3. "Who Needs To Dream?" – 3:56
4. "Sweet Heaven" – 3:43
5. "Bolero de Amor" – 4:31
6. "This Can’t Be Real" - (duet with Olivia Newton-John) – 4:15
7. "Copacabana (At The Copa)" 2005 Dance Mix – 5:03

=== Harmony ===
(Music by Barry Manilow, Lyrics by Bruce Sussman)

1. "Harmony" – 4:38
2. "And What Do You See?" – 3:43
3. "Every Single Day" – 2:59
4. "This Is Our Time!" – 3:04
5. "Where You Go" – 3:35
6. "In This World" – 4:23
7. "Stars In The Night" – 4:00

== Personnel ==
- Barry Manilow – vocals, acoustic piano
- Ron Pedley – acoustic piano, synthesizers
- Andy Rumble – acoustic piano
- Ron Walters – acoustic piano
- Steve Welch – acoustic piano
- Mike Lent – guitars
- Chuck Berghofer – acoustic bass
- Russ McKinnon – drums
- Olivia Newton-John – vocals (6)

Orchestra

- Joe Soldo – orchestra contractor
- Assa Drori and Bruce Dukov – concertmasters

Brass and Woodwinds

- Lee Callet, Bob Carr, Gene Ciproiano, Jeff Driskill, Phil Feather, Dan Higgins and Greg Huckins – woodwinds
- Bryant Byers, Craig Gosnell, Alan Kaplan, Bob McChesney, Charlie Morillas and Chauncey Welsch – trombone
- Rick Baptist, Wayne Bergeron, Warren Luening, Larry McGuire and Frank Szabo – trumpet
- Daniel P. Kelley, Paul Klintworth, John A. Reynolds and Trish Skye – French horn

Strings

- Trevor Handy, John Krovoza, Armen Ksajikian, Tim Landauer, Tina Soule, David Speltz and Cecilia Tsan – cello
- Julie Berghofer and Gayle Levant – harp
- Brett Banducci, Bob Becker, Caroline Buckman, Kenneth Burward-Hoy, Miguel Ferguson, Vicki Miskolczy, Kazue Pitelka and Harry Shirinian – viola
- Charlie Bisharat, Rebecca Bunnell, Eve Butler, Darius Campo, Kevin Connolly, Joel Derouin, Lisa Dondlinger, Assa Drori, Bruce Dukov, Ronald Folsom, Berj Garabedian, Peter Kent, Raymond Kobler, Johana Krejci, Jennifer Munday, Katia Popov, Jim Stark, Haim Shtrum, Yan To, Olivia Tsui, Irina Voloshina, Dynell Weber and Shari Zippert – violin

Percussion

- Mark Converse and Dan Greco

== Production ==
- Garry C. Kief – executive producer, personal manager
- Rob Kief – executive producer
- Barry Manilow – producer
- Phil Ramone – producer
- David Benson – associate producer, digital audio and sequencing
- Dave Reitzas – recording, mixing
- Nick Marshall – assistant engineer, mix assistant
- Mark Valentine – assistant engineer
- Scott Moore – mix assistant
- Greg Bartheld – digital audio and sequencing
- Steve Deutsch – digital audio and sequencing
- Gino Finley – digital audio and sequencing
- Ted Jensen – mastering at Sterling Sound (New York, NY)
- Jill Dell'Abate – production manager
- Abbey Anna – production supervisor
- Kurt Sievert – production supervisor
- John Adams – art direction
- Sara Zickuhr – art direction
- Jeff Katz – photography
