= A Christmas Gift of Love =

Studio album by Barry Manilow
- Released: November 12, 2002
- Recorded: August and September 2002
- Studios: Capitol Studios (Hollywood, California); Schnee Studios (North Hollywood, California); The Hop (Sherman Oaks, California)
- Genres: Pop; Easy listening; Christmas
- Length: 30:33
- Label: Columbia
- Producers: Barry Manilow; Robbie Buchanan

Barry Manilow chronology
Ultimate Manilow (2002)	A Christmas Gift of Love (2002)	2 Nights Live! (2004)

Professional ratings
Review scores
Source	Rating
Allmusic	link

A Christmas Gift of Love is the second Christmas-themed album by singer-songwriter Barry Manilow released in 2002. The album went Gold in the United States. It was done with Columbia Records instead of his usual label of Concord Records. However, as part of the agreement with Concord, the logo of both labels appear on this release.

== Track listing ==
No.	Title	Writer(s)	Length
1.	"Winter Wonderland"		1:44
2.	"Happy Holiday/White Christmas"		2:45
3.	"Santa Claus Is Coming to Town"		1:53
4.	"(There's No Place Like) Home for the Holidays"		2:27
5.	"I'll Be Home for Christmas"		3:20
6.	"My Favorite Things"		2:26
7.	"The Christmas Waltz"		2:56
8.	"I've Got My Love to Keep Me Warm"		2:59
9.	"River"		3:44
10.	"What Are You Doing New Year's Eve?"		3:47
11.	"A Gift of Love"	Barry Manilow, Bruce Sussman	2:25

== Personnel ==
- Barry Manilow – vocals
- Robbie Buchanan – keyboards
- Michael Lang – acoustic piano
- Ken Berry – guitars
- Dean Parks – guitars
- John Pisano – guitars
- Michael Thompson – guitars
- Chuck Berghofer – bass
- Gregg Field – drums
- David Low – orchestra contractor
- Bruce Dukov – concertmaster
- Terry Woodson – music copyist

=== Production ===
- Garry C. Kief – executive producer
- Jay Landers – executive producer
- Barry Manilow – producer
- Robbie Buchanan – producer
- Bill Schnee – recording, mixing
- Scott Erickson – engineer, production coordinator
- Toby Foster – assistant engineer
- Steve Genewick – assistant engineer
- Charlie Paakkari – assistant engineer
- Ryan Petrie – assistant mix engineer
- Jay Anista – studio assistant
- Will Donovan – studio assistant
- James Goforth – studio assistant
- Bruce Monical – studio assistant
- Robert Hadley – mastering
- Doug Sax – mastering
- The Mastering Lab (Hollywood, California) – mastering location

== Certifications ==
Region	Certification	Certified units/sales
United States (RIAA)	Gold	500,000^{^}
^{^} Shipments figures based on certification alone.
