= The Essential Barry Manilow =

Greatest hits album by Barry Manilow
- Released: April 26, 2005
- Genres: Pop; Easy listening
- Length: 161:47
- Label: Arista
- Producers: Barry Manilow, Ron Dante, Jim Steinman, Howie Rice, Eddie Arkin, Emilio and The Jerks (Emilio Estefan Jr., Joe Glado & Lawrence Dermer), Tony Moran, Jack White, Paul Staveley O'Duffy, Artie Butler, Jerry Hey, Bob Gaudio & Phil Ramone

Barry Manilow chronology
Scores (2004)	The Essential Barry Manilow (2005)	The Greatest Songs of the Fifties (2006)

Professional ratings
Review scores
Source	Rating
AllMusic	4.5/5 stars

The Essential Barry Manilow is a compilation album released by singer and songwriter Barry Manilow in 2005. The album consisted of two CDs, with a total of 34 tracks as part of The Essential series by Sony BMG. In 2010, a limited edition three CD version was released with 8 additional songs.

== Track listing ==
=== Disc 1 ===
1. "Mandy" (single version) [3:21]
2. "It's A Miracle" (extended single version) [3:44]
3. "Could It Be Magic" (single version) [4:18]
4. "I Write the Songs" (album version) [3:55]
5. "Bandstand Boogie" [2:50]
6. "Tryin' To Get The Feeling Again" [3:49]
7. "Beautiful Music" [4:36]
8. "This One's For You" [3:29]
9. "Weekend In New England" [3:45]
10. "Jump Shout Boogie (Live)" [2:55]
11. "Looks Like We Made It" [3:33]
12. "Daybreak" (Live) [3:42]
13. "New York City Rhythm" (Live) [3:51]
14. "Can't Smile Without You" [3:12]
15. "Even Now" [3:30]
16. "Copacabana (At The Copa)" (disco version) [5:44]
17. "Ready to Take a Chance Again (mono mixdown)" (theme from Foul Play) [3:02]

=== Disc 2 ===
1. "Somewhere in the Night" [3:28]
2. "Ships" [4:00]
3. "When I Wanted You" [3:35]
4. "I Don't Want to Walk Without You" [3:57]
5. "One Voice" [3:03]
6. "I Made It Through the Rain" [4:24]
7. "Lonely Together" [4:19]
8. "The Old Songs" [4:39]
9. "Somewhere Down the Road" [4:00]
10. "Memory" [4:56]
11. "Some Kind of Friend" [4:03]
12. "Read 'Em and Weep" [5:25]
13. "When October Goes" [4:00]
14. "I'm Your Man" (Club Mix) [6:11]
15. "Brooklyn Blues" [5:09]
16. "Hey Mambo" [2:52]
17. "I'd Really Love to See You Tonight" (Up-Tempo Mix) [3:53]

=== Disc 3 [Limited Edition 3.0] ===
1. "Let's Hang On" [3:11]
2. "You're Looking Hot Tonight" [3:56]
3. "Keep Each Other Warm" [4:36]
4. "All The Time" [3:17]
5. "Let Freedom Ring" [4:06]
6. "Sweet Heaven (I'm In Love Again)" [4:13]
7. "I Am Your Child" [2:17]
8. "Every Single Day" [2:57]

== Charts ==
Chart performance for The Essential Barry Manilow
Chart (2026)	Peak position
Greek Albums (IFPI)	5
