= Live on Broadway =

Live album by Barry Manilow
- Released: April 17, 1990
- Recorded: December 2–3, 1989
- Genre: Pop; Easy listening
- Length: 74:10
- Label: Arista
- Producer: Barry Manilow; Michael Delugg

Barry Manilow chronology
Barry Manilow (1989)	Live on Broadway (1990)	Because It's Christmas (1990)

Professional ratings
Review scores
Source	Rating
Allmusic	3.5/5 stars
The Rolling Stone Album Guide	2/5 stars

Live on Broadway is a live album by singer-songwriter Barry Manilow, released in 1990. The album was recorded at the Chicago Theatre in Chicago, Illinois, on December 2 and December 3, 1989.

== Track listing ==
No.	Title	Writer(s)	Length
1.	"Sweet Life/It's A Long Way Up"	Barry Manilow/John Annesi; Barry Manilow	6:56
2.	"Brooklyn Blues"	Barry Manilow; Bruce Sussman; Jack Feldman	3:41
3.	"Memory"	Andrew Lloyd Webber; T. S. Eliot; Trevor Nunn	4:18
4.	"Up Front"	Barry Manilow; Bruce Sussman	5:26
5.	"God Bless the Other 99"	Ken Welch; Mitzie Welch	4:39
6.	"Mandy/It's a Miracle"	Richard Kerr; Scott English/Barry Manilow; Marty Panzer	5:26
7.	"Some Good Things Never Last" (Duet with Debra Byrd)	Mark Radice	5:34
8.	"If You Remember Me"	Marvin Hamlisch; Carole Bayer Sager	3:36
9.	"Do Like I Do"	Wayne Hammer; Jeff Slater	3:50
10.	"The Best Seat in the House"	Dave Grusin; Alan Bergman; Marilyn Bergman	3:48
11.	"The Gonzo Hits Medley" (*see below for song list)		22:05
12.	"If I Can Dream"	Walter Earl Brown	4:51
Total length:			74:10

*The Gonzo Hits Medley (snippets of each song)
No.	Title	Writer(s)	Length
1.	"One Voice"	Barry Manilow
2.	"I Write the Songs"	Bruce Johnston
3.	"The Old Songs"	David Pomeranz; Buddy Kaye
4.	"Bandstand Boogie"	Charles Albertine; Larry Elgart; Les Elgart; Bob Horn; Barry Manilow; Bruce Sussman
5.	"I Don't Want to Walk Without You"	Jule Styne; Frank Loesser
6.	"Weekend in New England"	Randy Edelman
7.	"Even Now"	Marty Panzer; Barry Manilow
8.	"Some Kind of Friend"	Barry Manilow; Adrienne Anderson
9.	"New York City Rhythm"	Marty Panzer; Barry Manilow
10.	"Copacabana (At the Copa)"	Barry Manilow; Jack Feldman; Bruce Sussman
11.	"Read 'Em and Weep"	Jim Steinman
12.	"When I Wanted You"	Gino Cunico
13.	"Somewhere Down the Road"	Cynthia Weil; Tom Snow
14.	"This One's for You"	Marty Panzer; Barry Manilow
15.	"Tryin' to Get the Feeling Again"	David Pomeranz
16.	"Ready to Take a Chance Again"	Charles Fox; Norman Gimbel
17.	"Let's Hang On"	Bob Crewe; Sandy Linzer; Denny Randell
18.	"Somewhere in the Night"	Richard Kerr; Will Jennings
19.	"Could It Be Magic"	Barry Manilow; Adrienne Anderson
20.	"I Made It Through the Rain"	Gerard Kenny; Jack Feldman; Drey Shepperd; Bruce Sussman; Barry Manilow
21.	"Daybreak"	Barry Manilow; Adrienne Anderson
22.	"I Write the Songs"	Bruce Johnston

- Track information and credits taken from the album's liner notes.
