= Scott Erickson (musician) =

American producer, composer and arranger

- Born: October 17, 1967 (age 58); Appleton, Wisconsin, U.S.
- Genres: Pop, Latin, soft rock
- Occupations: Composer, record producer, arranger, songwriter, and engineer
- Instruments: Keyboards, vocals
- Years active: 1990–present
- Website: Personal website

Scott Erickson (born October 17, 1967) is an American composer, record producer, arranger, songwriter, and engineer. He has worked across music production, television, film, cruise line entertainment, and themed attractions, collaborating with artists, broadcasters, and entertainment brands in the United States, Europe, Asia, and Latin America. He has received two Latin Grammy Awards and been nominated for a Grammy Award.

Erickson has received two Latin Grammy Awards for Best Latin Children’s Album, winning in 2023 for his work as arranger and engineer on Vamos al Zoo by Danilo y Chapis and in 2024 for his work as arranger and engineer on ¡A cantar! by Danilo y Chapis. He has also been nominated for a Grammy Award for Best Traditional Pop Vocal Album for his production work on In The Swing of Christmas by Barry Manilow.

== Early life and education ==
Originally from Seattle, Washington, Scott Erickson studied music at the Berklee College of Music, graduating in 1992. After completing his studies, he relocated to Los Angeles, where he began working in the music industry as an assistant and collaborator on commercial recording projects.

== Career ==
=== Early career ===
After stints working as an assistant for The Manhattan Transfer and Al Teller (Chairman and CEO, MCA Music Entertainment Group), he landed a job working with Robbie Buchanan. From 1997 until 2003, Erickson learned the craft of making records and, in 2003, left Buchanan to begin his production career on his own.

=== Notable collaborations ===
Since then, artists that Erickson has produced and/or arranged for include Barry Manilow, Mijares, Yuri, Carly Simon, Alison Krauss, and Michelle Tumes. He has also arranged and composed music and songs for numerous Disney films films and live entertainment shows at the Disney theme parks.

=== Awards and milestones ===
In 2008, Erickson's production work was honored with a Grammy Award nomination as a co-producer of Barry Manilow's In the Swing of Christmas album, which also earned him his first Gold Record as a producer. In 2009, he received his first Platinum record with Mijares' Vivir Así, which was followed shortly by the follow-up Vivir Así Vol II, certified Gold on the day of its release on April 14, 2010. Following the success of the Mijares albums, Erickson produced Inusual for Yuri under Warner Music México, released in 2010.

Scott Erickson works out of his studio through his company, Erickson Entertainment.

== Later career ==
=== Television and film ===
- Dragon Tales (1999–2000) — composer
- Barney & Friends (2007–2010) — songwriter
- Angelina Ballerina: The Next Steps (2009–2010) — songwriter
- Papás por siempre (2025) — composer and soundtrack producer
- Más allá de ti (2023) — co-composer of the main theme
- No Chimney, No Problem (2026) — producer and composer

=== Theme parks and live entertainment ===
- Disneyland Paris 25th Anniversary (2017) — composer and producer
- Tokyo Disneyland Easter Parades (2010–2020) — songwriter, arranger, and producer
- Tokyo DisneySea – Tip-Top Easter (2019) — songwriter, arranger, and producer
- Cedar Point 150th Anniversary (2021) — songwriter, arranger, and producer
- Kings Island 50th Anniversary (2022) — songwriter, arranger, and producer
- Cedar Fair Carnival Parade (2019–present) — songwriter, arranger, and producer
- Universal Studios Japan – Streetside Symphony (2024) — arranger and producer

=== Cruise line productions ===
- Holland America Line
- Seabourn
- Disney Cruise Line
- Norwegian Cruise Line
- Carnival Cruise Line
- Princess Cruises

=== Music production / albums ===
- Barry Manilow — In the Swing of Christmas (2007) — producer (Grammy nomination)
- Mijares — Vivir Así (2009) — producer
- Yuri — Inusual (2010) — producer
- Alexander Acha — La vida es… (2011) — producer
- Danilo y Chapis — ¡A cantar! (2018) — arranger and engineer (Latin Grammy Award–winning project)

== Awards and recognition ==
Scott Erickson has received recognition from the Latin Grammy Awards, winning two awards for Best Children’s Album, and has also received a Grammy Award nomination for his production work on In the Swing of Christmas by Barry Manilow.

- 2009 – Grammy Award nomination for Best Traditional Pop Vocal Album for production work on In the Swing of Christmas by Barry Manilow
- 2023 – Latin Grammy Award for Best Children’s Album for work as arranger and engineer on Vamos al zoo by Danilo y Chapis
- 2024 – Latin Grammy Award for Best Children’s Album for work as arranger and engineer on ¡A cantar! by Danilo y Chapis

== Artists worked with ==
Scott Erickson has produced, associate-produced, arranged, engineered or played on albums with the following artists:

- Barry Manilow
- Barbra Streisand
- Bette Midler
- The Manhattan Transfer
- Mijares
- Yuri
- Alison Krauss
- Carly Simon
- Johnny Mathis
- Michelle Tumes
- Ed Jordan
- Michael Crawford
- Davy Jones
- Peabo Bryson
