= Greg Gorman =

American photographer

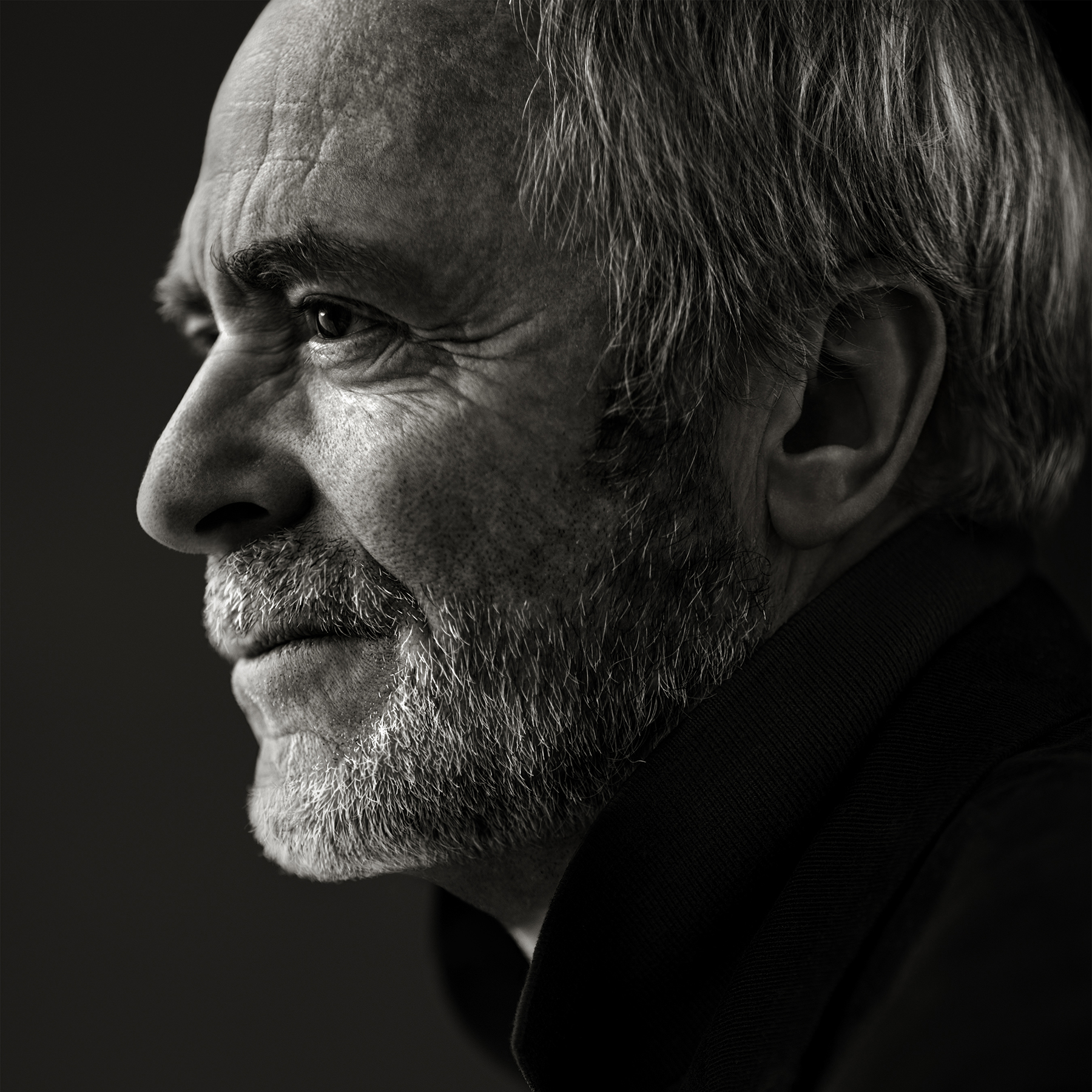
- Greg Gorman, 2011 ©Andreas Bitesnich
- Education: University of Kansas; University of Southern California (MFA)
- Occupations: Photographer, winemaker
- Notable work: *It's Not About Me - A Retrospective* (2019); *Homage: A Tribute to Tribal Artists* (2022)
- Awards: Lucie Award for Portraiture; Professional Photographers of America Lifetime Achievement Award

Greg Gorman is an American photographer.

== Education ==
Gorman attended the University of Kansas with a major in Photojournalism and completed his studies at the University of Southern California, graduating with a Master of Fine Arts degree in Cinematography.

== Career ==
=== Photography ===
Over the years, Gorman has been acknowledged for his contribution to the world of photography, from the prestigious Lucie Awards for Portraiture to, more recently, the Professional Photographers of America where he received the Lifetime Achievement Award in Portraiture. His charitable works by such organizations as The Elton John Aids Foundation, The Oscar de La Hoya Foundation and Paws LA, to name but a few, have also been critically recognized.

Besides traveling the world for specialized photographic projects, Gorman continues to work on compilations of his imagery and exhibits his work in galleries and museums around the globe. It's Not About Me - A Retrospective marks Gorman’s twelfth monograph published in 2019. He has just completed this 13th work, ‘Homage,’ which focuses on the influence of African tribal art on European and American culture and represents his first foray into the fine art world with collaborator and longtime friend, Gary Johns.

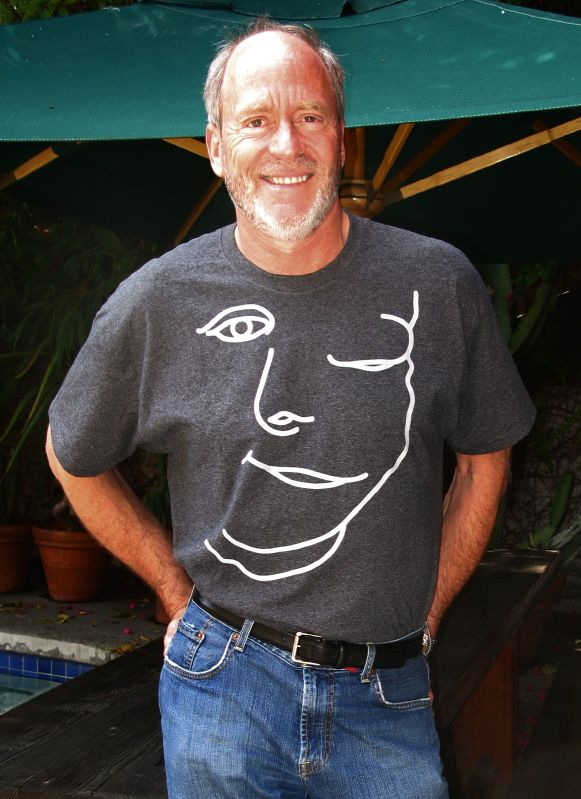
Greg Gorman in 2007

Gorman is a public speaker in the photographic community and shares his expertise in hands-on photographic workshops worldwide.

=== Winemaking ===
In addition to his photography career, Gorman made wine under his own label, GKG Cellars, in collaboration with Dave Phinney of Orin Swift Cellars of the Napa Valley from 2006 to 2018. It received high scores from both Robert Parker and the Wine Spectator.

== Personal life ==
Gorman resides with his two French Bulldogs, Gladys and Cyrill, in Los Angeles, California.

== Publications ==
=== Books ===
- Greg Gorman – Volume I CPC Publishing (1989) ISBN 978-1-87-168100-0
- Greg Gorman – Volume II, Treville Press (1992) ISBN 978-4-84-570778-2
- Inside Life, Rizzoli (1997) (foreword by John Waters) ISBN 978-0-8478-1998-0
- Perspectives, Electa Mondadori (1999) ISBN 978-3-89-790012-7
- Perspectives, Arnoldsche Art Publishers (2000) ISBN 978-3-89-790012-7
- As I see It, Powerhouse Books (2001) ISBN 978-1-57687-087-7
- Just Between Us, Arena Editions (2002) ISBN 978-1-892041-80-7
- Odes to Pindar, 21st Editions (2007) ISBN 1-892733-36-6
- In Their Youth, Damiani (2009) ISBN 978-88-6208-097-2
- Framed, Damiani (2012) In Their Youth, Damiani (2009) ISBN 978-8-86-208203-7
- Outside the Studio, Damiani (2014) ISBN 978-8-86-208391-1
- Private Works, Verona Libri (2016) ISBN 978-0-69-277167-9
- It's Not About Me, teNeues (2019) ISBN 978-3-96-171275-5
- Homage: A Tribute to Tribal Artists, Philo Fine Arts (2022) ISBN 978-8-86-208391-1

== Exhibitions ==
- 2021: Fahey/Klein Gallery, Los Angeles
- 2021: Immagis Galerie, Munich, Germany
- 2021: Galerie Paffreath, Dusseldorf, Germany
- 2023: Hohmann Fine Art, Palm Desert, CA.
- 2023: XPOSURE 2023, Sharjah, UAE

=== UPCOMING ===
- 2023: Homage to African Tribal Artists, St. Petri, Zü Lübeck, Germany
