= Gene Cipriano =

American woodwindist (1928–2022)

Background information
- Birth name: Gene Fred Cipriano
- Born: July 6, 1928; New Haven, Connecticut, U.S.
- Died: November 12, 2022 (aged 94); Studio City, California, U.S.
- Genres: Jazz, pop, soundtracks
- Occupation: Musician
- Instrument(s): Clarinet, saxophone, oboe, flute, other woodwind
- Years active: 1952–2006

Gene Fred Cipriano (July 6, 1928 – November 12, 2022), known familiarly as "Cip", was an American woodwindist and session musician, playing clarinet, oboe, flute and saxophone among other instruments. He played on hundreds of recording sessions, possibly more than any other woodwind musician.

== Biography ==
He was born in New Haven, Connecticut, the son of a musician who played clarinet in bands on Broadway. Gene Cipriano learned clarinet, saxophone and flute when young, played with Ted Fio Rito's band, and at the age of 23 was invited to join Tommy Dorsey's orchestra. He married band singer Frances Irvin, and settled in New York City where he played with such musicians as Lee Konitz and Claude Thornhill. He then joined the continuation Glenn Miller Orchestra led by Tex Beneke, where he met Henry Mancini.

When Mancini began writing music for television series such as Peter Gunn, he invited Cipriano to join him in California and contribute on flute. The two worked together many times on television and film scores in later years, and Cipriano played the clarinet solo on Mancini's "Baby Elephant Walk". Cipriano also worked with many other TV and film composers, including Michel Legrand, Andre Previn, Neal Hefti, Lalo Schifrin, and Marvin Hamlisch. During his career he recorded music for numerous television shows including Batman, The Flintstones, M*A*S*H*, Mission Impossible, Star Trek, The Simpsons, and American Dad. He played on West Side Story, performed the saxophone part for the character played by Tony Curtis in the film Some Like It Hot, and played on the soundtrack of both the original The Thomas Crown Affair and its 1999 remake.

Cipriano was also a noted session musician in Los Angeles, as a member of "The Wrecking Crew". Initially, he was sought by Harry Nilsson to play oboe, and subsequently played on many pop hits of the 1960s and 1970s, including those by the Beach Boys and the Monkees. Other musicians with whom he worked included Frank Sinatra, Neil Diamond, Rosemary Clooney, Stan Kenton, Tony Bennett, Frank Zappa, and Lady Gaga. Fellow musician and record producer Tom Ranier said that Cipriano was "one of, if not the most, recorded woodwind player in history having played on thousands of record dates, movies, jingles and TV shows." In 2019, it was reported that Cipriano had played in the Academy Awards orchestra in each of the previous 59 years.

As a jazz musician, Cipriano played many shows and on over 200 recordings, including as a member of Thelonious Monk’s band on Monk's Blues. He also played with Gerry Mulligan, Shelly Manne, and many others. He made his only album as a leader, First Time Out, a double CD on which he played all the solos, in 2006 at the age of 78. On the album, he played saxophone, clarinet, and English horn. Ranier said of the album: "He played all his instruments superbly, producing beautiful singing sounds on each. His technical ability on each instrument was at the highest level and he could sight read music of any style and adapt to any genre, and do so perfectly."

Cipriano died on November 12, 2022, at the age of 94.
