= Jeff Katz (photographer) =

Photographer from the United States

- Born: 1960 (age 65–66); Fairfield, Connecticut
- Education: Ithaca College, New York
- Occupation: Photography
- Years active: 1982 - present
- Known for: collaboration with Prince
- Notable work: album covers Sign o' the Times, The Family, Parade
- Website: jeffkatzphotography.com

Jeff Katz (born 1960) is an American commercial photographer. His early work focused primarily on photographing musicians for the recording industry. His photography expanded to capturing the images of actors and directors in film and TV. His work in the entertainment business is seen in advertising, movie posters, magazines, albums, tour books, and book publishing.

== Education ==
Jeff Katz was born in Fairfield, Connecticut. He graduated Cum Laude from Ithaca College, New York state in 1982 with a Bachelor of Science degree in Cinema and Photography, and moved to Los Angeles, CA.

== Career ==
=== Photography ===
During the first years of his photography career, Katz worked in the music recording industry, shooting for record labels and publications such as Warner Bros. Records, Arista Records, and Universal Music Group, and Rolling Stone Magazine.

His music photography includes album covers, tour books, single releases and promotional advertising for a range of music genres. In the 1990s Katz photographed covers, and featured articles, for publications such as People, Life, Parade, Entertainment Weekly, and TV Guide. This work expanded his career with motion pictures and television studios including Sony Pictures, A&E Network, Columbia Pictures, ABC and Disney Studios. His photography for Sports Illustrated brought him the opportunity to photograph athletes such as Oscar De La Hoya and others.

He has photographed contemporary figures, artists, performers and athletes including LL Cool J, Earth, Wind & Fire, George Clooney, Denzel Washington, Colin Kaepernick, Bon Jovi, Rob Lowe, Olivia Munn, Ozzy Osbourne, Mel Gibson, John Densmore, Vanilla Ice, Elton John, and President Joe Biden.

== Collaboration with Prince ==
While in his early 20s, Katz became the personal photographer and official tour photographer for musician Prince for over a decade, and shot the covers of multiple Prince albums.

In 1984, Warnes Bros. offered him the position of assistant photographer on the set of Prince's The Family album. Subsequently, he became the behind the scenes and personal photographer for Prince's directorial debut Under the Cherry Moon filmed in Nice, France. He then became Prince's official tour photographer, and collaborated for 12 years from January 1985 to the end 1996, creating over fifty photo sessions with him and his roster of artists including Sheila E. (1988). Katz shot the covers of the Parade (1986) and Sign o' the Times (1987) albums. Katz was the main photographer for Prince's tour books and promotional imagery for Lovesexy (1988), Batman (1989), Graffiti Bridge (1990), Diamonds and Pearls (1991) and more. He also photographed Prince's wedding to Mayte García in 1996.

In 2019, Katz was a guest speaker at the Prince Celebration at Paisley Park in Chanhassen, Minnesota, where he talked about his shoots with Prince. His photographs of Prince are displayed on the walls of Paisley Park, including a room dedicated to the Under the Cherry Moon film. In an agreement with Prince's estate, Katz has an online art gallery showcasing his images of Prince. In 2020, a 120-page hardcover book with previously unseen photographs by Katz were published as part of Paisley Park's rerelease of Prince's Sign o' the Times recording.
