= The Complete Collection and Then Some... =

1992 Barry Manilow box set

Box set by Barry Manilow
- Released: November 10, 1992
- Genre: Pop
- Label: Arista

Barry Manilow chronology
Showstoppers (1991)	The Complete Collection and Then Some... (1992)	Greatest Hits: The Platinum Collection (1994)

Professional ratings
Review scores
Source	Rating
Allmusic	4.5/5 stars
Entertainment Weekly	C

The Complete Collection and Then Some... is a four-disc and one video greatest hits compilation by American pop singer Barry Manilow. It features 70 tracks including unreleased songs and five new recordings. It was certified RIAA gold. Originally released in 1992 with a VHS cassette, this box set was re-released on September 6, 2005, with a DVD replacing the tape.

== Track listing ==
- Note: all the composers are listed as they appear in the booklet.

=== Disc one ===
1. "The Best of Me" (Intro Only) (New Recording) (Recorded for this collection) 1992 (Richard Marx/David Foster/Jeremy Lubbock)
2. "Sweet Life" (Live from Carnegie Hall, June 23, 1972, during Barry's solo) 1972 (Barry Manilow)
3. "I Am Your Child" (Live from the Continental Baths Bell Records Showcase, June 2, 1973) 1973 (Manilow/Marty Panzer)
4. "Could It Be Magic" (Uptempo, performed by Featherbed featuring Barry Manilow) 1971 (Manilow/Tony Orlando)
5. "Could It Be Magic" (from Barry Manilow I) 1973 (Manilow/Anderson)
6. "Brandy" (Original Scott English single, edited) 1971 (Scott English/Richard Kerr)
7. "Mandy" (previously unissued take 1) 1974 (English/Kerr)
8. "It's a Miracle" (from Barry Manilow II) (Manilow/Panzer)
9. "Sandra" (Live from Carnegie Hall, November 1974) 1974 (Manilow/Enoch Anderson)
10. "I Write the Songs" (from Tryin' to Get the Feeling) 1975 (Bruce Johnston)
11. "As Sure as I'm Standing Here" (from Tryin' to Get the Feeling) 1975 (Manilow/Anderson)
12. "New York City Rhythm" (from Tryin' to Get the Feeling) 1975 (Manilow/Panzer)
13. "Tryin' to Get the Feeling Again" (Alternate take, 1975) 1975 (David Pomeranz)
14. "All the Time" (from This One's For You) 1976 (Manilow/Panzer)
15. "Ready to Take a Chance Again" (from the movie Foul Play) 1978 (Charles Fox/Norman Gimbel)
16. "Somewhere in the Night" (from Even Now) 1978 (Kerr/Will Jennings)
17. "The Old Songs" (Alternate take, 1981) 1981 (Pomeranz/Buddy Kaye)
18. "I Don't Want to Walk Without You" (from One Voice) 1979 (Frank Loesser/Jule Styne)
19. "If I Should Love Again" (Alternate take, 1981) 1981 (Manilow)

=== Disc two ===
1. "Copacabana (At the Copa)" (Home demo composing of song recording, 1977) 1977 (Barry Manilow/Bruce Sussman/Jack Feldman)
2. "Copacabana (At the Copa)" (from Even Now) 1978 (Manilow/Sussman/Feldman)
3. "Dancin' Fool" (from the CBS-TV Special Big Fun on Swing Street) 1988 (Manilow/Sussman/Feldman)
4. "I'm Your Man" (from Manilow (album)) 1985 (Manilow/Alan Rich/Howie Rice)
5. "Hey Mambo" (duet with Kid Creole and the Coconuts) (from Swing Street) 1987 (Manilow/Sussman/Feldman/Tom Kelly)
6. "Big Fun" (from Swing Street) 1987 (Eddie Arkin/Lorraine Feather)
7. "Riders to the Stars" (from Barry Manilow Live) 1977 (Manilow/Anderson)
8. "I Wanna Be Somebody's Baby" (Unreleased Barry Manilow Live Outtake) 1977 (Manilow/Anderson)
9. "Daybreak" (from Barry Manilow Live) 1977 (Manilow/Anderson)
10. "Even Now" (Live from Tokyo, Japan) 1983 (Manilow/Panzer)
11. "Life Will Go On" (Live from London, England) 1980 (Kerr/John Bettis)
12. "Memory" (from Live On Broadway) 1990 (Andrew Lloyd Webber/Trevor Nunn/Thomas Stearns Elliot)
13. "Ships" (from the Video Live On Broadway) 1990 (Ian Hunter)
14. "If I Can Dream" (from Live On Broadway) 1990 (Walter Earl Brown)
15. "One Voice" (from Barry Live In Britain) 1982 (Manilow)

=== Disc three ===
1. "This One's for You" (Unreleased Demo) 1976 (Barry Manilow/Marty Panzer)
2. "Lay Me Down" (from Tryin' to Get the Feeling) 1975 (Larry Weiss)
3. "Big City Blues" (duet with Mel Tormé) (from 2:00 AM Paradise Cafe) 1984 (Manilow/Adrienne Anderson)
4. "Somewhere Down the Road" (Unreleased Demo) 1981 (Cynthia White/Tom Snow)
5. "A Little Travelling Music, Please" (from Barry Manilow (1989 album)) 1989 (Manilow/Sussman/Feldman)
6. "You Could Show Me" (from One Voice) 1979 (Manilow/Sussman/Feldman)
7. "Ave Maria" (from The Christmas Album...A Gift of Hope) 1991 (Traditional)
8. "Look to the Rainbow" (duet with Barbara Cook) (from Showstoppers) 1991 (Burton Lane/E. Y. Harburg)
9. "Joey" (Unreleased Demo) 1981 (Manilow/Enoch Anderson)
10. "Please Don't Be Scared" (from Barry Manilow (1989 album)) 1989 (Mindy Sterling)
11. "Baby, It's Cold Outside" (duet with K. T. Oslin) (from Because It's Christmas) 1990 (Frank Loesser)
12. "When October Goes" (from 2:00 AM Paradise Cafe) (Manilow/Johnny Mercer)
13. "Ain't It a Shame" (Unreleased outtake from If I Should Love Again) 1981 (Manilow/Anderson)
14. "Brooklyn Blues" (from Swing Street) 1987 Manilow/Sussman/Feldman)
15. "How Do I Stop Loving You?" (Unreleased Demo) 1984 (Artie Butler/Norman Martin)
16. "Just Remember" (Unreleased Live Performance from Los Angeles, California) 1992 (Manilow/Mercer)
17. "I Can't Teach My Old Heart New Tricks" (New Recording) (Recorded for this collection) 1992 (Manilow/Mercer)
18. "Weekend in New England" (from This One's for You) 1976 (Randy Edelman)

=== Disc four ===
1. "Give My Regards to Broadway" (Unreleased Live Excerpts from the "Showstoppers" Tour, in Atlantic City, New Jersey) 1992 (George M. Cohan/Barry Manilow*/Bruce Sussman*) (*additional lyrics)
2. "Send in the Clowns/Looks Like We Made It" (Unreleased Live Excerpts from the "Showstoppers" Tour in Atlantic City, New Jersey) 1992 (Stephen Sondheim/Richard Kerr/Will Jennings)
3. "Can't Smile Without You" (Unreleased Alternate First Take) 1977 (Chris Arnold/David Martin/Geoff Morrow)
4. "Beautiful Music" (from Tryin' to Get the Feeling) 1975 (Manilow/Marty Panzer)
5. "Fugue for Tinhorns" (Trio with Michael Crawford and Hinton Battle) (from Showstoppers) 1991 (Frank Loesser)
6. "My Girl / No One in This World" (duet with Melissa Manchester) (Unreleased Outtake from This One's For You) 1976 (Smokey Robinson/Manilow)
7. "Don't Talk to Me of Love" (duet with Mireille Mathieu) (from the French release of Manilow (album)) 1985 (Jean Lenoir/Tim Smit/Charlie Skarbek)
8. "The Last Duet" (duet with Lily Tomlin) (from Barry (album)) 1980 (Manilow/Sussman/Feldman)
9. "Wild Places" (Unreleased Demo) 1981 (Duncan Browne)
10. "Never Met a Man I Didn't Like" (from Showstoppers) 1991 (Cy Coleman/Betty Comden/Adolph Green)
11. "Who Needs to Dream" (from the Copacabana Soundtrack) 1986 (Manilow/Sussman/Feldman/Artie Butler)
12. "Read 'Em and Weep" (from "Greatest Hits Vol. II") 1983 (Jim Steinman)
13. "Let Freedom Ring" (Unreleased Outtake from "Showstoppers") 1991 (Manilow/Sussman/Feldman)
14. "Let Me Be Your Wings (from "Thumbelina") (New Recording) (Recorded for this collection) 1992 (Manilow/Sussman/Feldman)
15. "If Tomorrow Never Comes" (New Recording (Recorded for this collection) 1992 (Garth Brooks/Kent Blazy)
16. "Another Life" (Recorded for this collection) 1992 (Preston Sturges/Andy Hill)
17. "I Made It Through the Rain" (Unreleased Alternate Take) 1980 (Gerard Kenny/Drey Sheppard)
18. "The Best of Me" (New Recording) (Full version-recorded for this collection) 1992 (Richard Marx/David Foster/Jeremy Lubbock)

=== VHS tape/Disc five: DVD ("Barry Manilow Performances - Volume One: The Highlights") ===
- "/" are meant as the word "on". Information on where the videos were taped are in the order they appear on the back of the video.
1. "Chapel of Love" (performed with Bette Midler - Continental Baths - Videotaped September 5, 1971) (Jeff Barry/Ellie Greenwich/Phil Spector)
2. "Very Strange Medley" (performed on "The Mike Douglas Show"; aired on Group W/June 10, 1974) (arr. by Manilow)
3. "Mandy/Could It Be Magic" (performed on The Midnight Special; aired on NBC/March 14, 1975)(English/Kerr/Manilow/Anderson)
4. "I Write the Songs" (performed on "Saturday Night Live" with Howard Cosell as the host; aired on ABC/October 11, 1975) (Johnston)
5. "It's a Miracle/This One's for You" (performed on "The Barry Manilow Special"; shown on ABC/March 2, 1977) (Manilow/Panzer)
6. Emmy Award Presentation for Best Comedy / Variety Special: 1977 ("29th Annual Emmy Awards"; aired on NBC/September 11, 1977)
7. "Daybreak" (performed on "The Second Barry Manilow Special"; shown on ABC/November 16, 1977) (Manilow/Anderson)
8. "Copacabana (At the Copa)" (performed during "Barry Manilow In Concert at The Greek Theatre"; shown on HBO/February 11, 1979) (Manilow/Sussman/Feldman)
9. "Weekend in New England" (performed on "The Third Barry Manilow Special"; shown on ABC/May 23, 1979) (Edelman)
10. "The Old Songs Medley" (performed during "The Concert At Blenheim Palace"; Videotaped August 27, 1983; Not previously released) (arr. by Manilow)
11. "When October Goes" (filmed during the making of "2:00 AM Paradise Cafe"; Videotaped July, 1984) (Manilow/Mercer)
12. "Keep Each Other Warm" (performed during "Barry Manilow Live On Broadway"; shown on Showtime/October 8, 1989) (Pete Sinfield/Hill)

== Certifications ==
Region	Certification	Certified units/sales
United States (RIAA)	Gold	500,000^{^}
^{^} Shipments figures based on certification alone.
