= 2 Nights Live! =

2 Nights Live

Live album by Barry Manilow
- Released: April 6, 2004
- Recorded: August 3–4, 2002
- Genre: Pop
- Length: 39:48
- Label: Stiletto

Barry Manilow chronology
A Christmas Gift of Love (2002)	2 Nights Live (2004)	Scores (2004)

Professional ratings
Review scores
Source	Rating
AllMusic	3.5/5 stars

2 Nights Live! is a live compilation album of a two-night concert released by Barry Manilow in 2004. It was recorded on August 3–4, 2002, at PNC Bank Arts Center in Holmdel, New Jersey, during the last two dates of the Barry Manilow Live 2002! tour. It reached number 27 on the Billboard 200 albums chart in late April 2004.

== Track listing ==
=== Night 1 ===
No.	Title	Length
1.	"The Walk to the Stage"	1:10
2.	"Gonzo Opening: Ready to Take a Chance Again/Daybreak/Somewhere in the Night/This One's for You"	7:06
3.	"Looks Like We Made It"	3:19
4.	"Can't Smile Without You"	5:54
5.	"Bandstand Boogie"	3:14
6.	"Mandy"	3:19
7.	"Even Now"	3:46
8.	"Dialogue 1"	0:21
9.	"Harmony" (from Harmony: A New Musical)	4:58
10.	"Turn the Radio Up"	4:03
11.	"Dialogue 2"	0:27
12.	"The Best of Me"	4:13
13.	"Weekend in New England"	4:00
14.	"Could It Be Magic (Play Off)"	0:50
15.	"Let Freedom Ring"	4:56
16.	"It's a Miracle"	2:35
17.	"Dialogue 3"	0:23
18.	"You're There"	3:10
19.	"We Live on Borrowed Time"	4:13
20.	"Could It Be Magic (Play Off)"	0:41

=== Night 2 ===
No.	Title	Length
1.	"Fanfare/I'm Comin' Back"	3:52
2.	"Sweet Heaven (I'm in Love Again)"	3:28
3.	"Who's Been Sleeping in My Bed"	3:22
4.	"Tryin' to Get the Feeling Again"	4:18
5.	"Somewhere Down the Road"	4:05
6.	"Dialogue 4"	0:28
7.	"That's Life"	3:07
8.	"Dialogue 5"	0:30
9.	"Every Single Day" (from Harmony: A New Musical)	3:05
10.	"New York City Rhythm (Intro)"	0:50
11.	"New York City Rhythm"	3:29
12.	"I Made It Through the Rain"	3:54
13.	"She Should'a Been Mine"	3:44
14.	"They Dance!"	3:17
15.	"Dialogue 6"	0:28
16.	"When October Goes"	3:50
17.	"If Tomorrow Never Comes"	4:47
18.	"Copacabana (At the Copa)"	3:44
19.	"I Write the Songs"	4:55
20.	"Old Friends"	1:11
21.	"Forever and a Day"	3:57
