= Barry Manilow Live =

Live album by Barry Manilow
- Released: May 1977
- Recorded: 21 December 1976–2 January 1977
- Venue: Uris Theatre, New York City
- Genre: Pop; Easy listening
- Length: 71:34
- Label: Arista
- Producer: Barry Manilow, Ron Dante

Barry Manilow chronology
This One's for You (1976)	Barry Manilow Live (1977)	Even Now (1978)

Singles from Barry Manilow Live
- 1. "Daybreak (Live)" Released: 1977; 2. "It's Just Another New Year's Eve" Released: 1977

Professional ratings
Review scores
Source	Rating
AllMusic	4/5 stars
Christgau's Record Guide	C−
The Rolling Stone Album Guide	2/5 stars

Barry Manilow Live is the fifth album by the singer-songwriter Barry Manilow. The album was released in 1977, and it became Manilow's first to top the US Billboard 200.

Manilow also was among 1977 Special Tony Award winners Lily Tomlin, Diana Ross, National Theatre For the Deaf and Equity Library Theatre honored with the award that year. He received it for Barry Manilow on Broadway, his 12-day stay at the Uris Theatre from December 21, 1976 to January 2, 1977, where this live album was recorded.

The album is known for giving the first commercial release to Manilow's VSM ("Very Strange Medley"). Before the performance Manilow refers to this as a medley of songs that he included in his act against the values of his "artsy fartsy friends". It is a medley of commercial jingles Manilow was involved with, either as a writer or performer, before he became a chart star. The products and companies these promoted include Kentucky Fried Chicken, State Farm, Stridex, Band-Aid, Green Bowlene, Dr. Pepper, Pepsi and McDonald's.

When first released on Compact Disc, dialogue and all movements to "Beautiful Music" were omitted for it all to fit on one disc, but the 2006 CD re-release restored all dialogue and songs, in addition to reordering the track listing to accommodate the added bonus tracks.

== Track listing ==
=== Original LP Release ===
==== Side 1 ====
1. "Riders to the Stars" (Adrienne Anderson, Barry Manilow) - 4:48
2. "Why Don't We Live Together" (Phil Galdston, Peter Thom) - 3:45
3. "Looks Like We Made It" (Richard Kerr, Will Jennings) - 4:00
4. "New York City Rhythm" (Barry Manilow, Marty Panzer) - 5:12

TT Side One: 17:45

==== Side 2 ====
1. "A Very Strange Medley (V.S.M.)" - 6:10
  1. "Kentucky Fried Chicken" (Al Gorgoni, Bob Nolan)
  2. "State Farm Insurance" (Barry Manilow, Jerry Gavin)
  3. "Stridex" (Barry Manilow)
  4. "Band-Aids" (Barry Manilow)
  5. "Bowlene" (Barry Manilow, Lois Wise)
  6. "Dr. Pepper" (Jake Holmes, Randy Newman)
  7. "Pepsi" (Ellen Starr, Jor McNeil)
  8. "McDonalds" (Kevin Gavin, Sid Woloshin)
2. "Jump Shout Boogie Medley" - 8:16
  1. "Jump Shout Boogie" (Barry Manilow, Bruce Sussman)
  2. "Avenue C" (Buck Clayton, Jon Hendricks, Dave Lambert)
  3. "Jumpin' at the Woodside" (Count Basie, Jon Hendricks)
  4. "Cloudburst" (Jimmy Harris, Jon Hendricks, Leroy Kirkland)
  5. "Bandstand Boogie" (Barry Manilow, Bob Horn, Bruce Sussman, Charles Albertine, Larry Elgart, Les Elgart)
3. "This One's for You" (Barry Manilow, Marty Panzer) - 4:14

TT Side Two: 18:40

TT Act One: 36:29

==== Side 3 ====
1. "Beautiful Music (Part I)" (Barry Manilow, Marty Panzer) - 2:02
2. "Daybreak" (Barry Manilow, Adrienne Anderson) - 4:17
3. "Lay Me Down" (Larry Weiss) - 4:41
4. "Weekend in New England" (Randy Edelman) - 4:16
5. "Studio Musician" (Rupert Holmes) - 4:15

TT Side 3: 19:31

==== Side 4 ====
1. "Beautiful Music (Part II)" (Barry Manilow, Marty Panzer) - 1:15
2. "Could It Be Magic/Mandy" (Adrienne Anderson, Barry Manilow, Frédéric Chopin/Richard Kerr, Scott English) - 8:00
3. "It's a Miracle" (Barry Manilow, Marty Panzer) - 5:14
4. "It's Just Another New Year's Eve" (Barry Manilow, Marty Panzer) - 4:21
5. "I Write the Songs" (Bruce Johnston) - 4:31
6. "Beautiful Music (Part III)" (Barry Manilow, Marty Panzer) - 2:21

TT Side 4: 25:42

TT Act Two: 45:13

TT Complete Program: 1h 22m

=== CD Release ===
Single-disc CD edition deletes Beautiful Music Pt. 1, Pt. 2 and Pt. 3

1. "Riders to the Stars" - 4:48
2. "Why Don't We Live Together" - 3:45
3. "Looks Like We Made It" - 4:00
4. "New York City Rhythm" - 5:12
5. "A Very Strange Medley" - 6:10
6. "Jump Shout Boogie Medley" - 8:16
7. "This One's for You" - 4:14
8. "Daybreak" - 4:17
9. "Lay Me Down" - 4:41
10. "Weekend in New England" - 4:16
11. "Studio Musician" - 4:15
12. "Could It Be Magic/Mandy" - 8:00
13. "It's a Miracle" - 5:14
14. "It's Just Another New Year's Eve" - 4:21
15. "I Write the Songs" - 4:31

=== Deluxe Legacy Edition ===
(*) indicates additional track not on original LP or CD release

(+) indicates track restored to its original set location

"Lay Me Down", "New York City Rhythm", "Daybreak" and "Beautiful Music Part 1"

Restored to its original set location

"Let Me Go", "I Am Your Child", "Lady Flash Medley" and "One of These Days"

Outtakes from the original concert restored to original set location.

==== Disc 1 ====
1. "Riders to the Stars" - 4:48
2. "Why Don't We Live Together" - 3:45
3. "Looks Like We Made It" - 4:00
4. "Let Me Go" - 4:00*
5. "A Very Strange Medley" - 6:10
6. "I Am Your Child" - 2:37*
7. "Jump Shout Boogie Medley" - 8:16
8. "This One's for You" - 4:14
9. "Lay Me Down" - 4:41+
10. "Weekend in New England" - 4:16
11. "Studio Musician" - 4:15
12. "New York City Rhythm" - 5:12+

==== Disc 2 ====
1. "Beautiful Music (Part I)" - 2:02+
2. "Daybreak" - 4:17+
3. "Tryin' to Get the Feeling Again"*
4. "Lady Flash Medley" - 5:37*
5. "Beautiful Music (Part II)" - 1:15
6. "One of These Days" - 2:56*
7. "Could It Be Magic/Mandy" - 8:00
8. "It's a Miracle" - 5:14
9. "It's Just Another New Year's Eve" - 4:21
10. "I Write the Songs" - 4:31
11. "Beautiful Music (Part III)" - 2:21

TT Complete Program: 1h 42m

One additional track entitled "I Wanna Be Somebody's Baby" does not appear here, however it does appear on The Complete Collection and Then Some...

== Personnel ==
The City Rhythm Band

- Barry Manilow - vocals, piano, music director
- Keith Loving - guitar
- Steven Donaghey - bass guitar
- Alan Axelrod - keyboards
- Lee Gurst - drums, orchestra conductor
- Harold "Ricardo" Alexander - congas
- Lady Flash (Debra Byrd, Monica Pege, Reparata Mazzola) - backing vocals

with:

- Marshall Rosenberg - percussion on "A Very Strange Medley"
- Sid McGinnis - additional guitar
- Gerald Alters - orchestration arrangements
- Arif Mardin, Barry Manilow, Charlie Calello, Dick Behrke, Joe Renzetti, Norman Harris - additional orchestration arrangements

Technical

- Michael Delugg - recording engineer
- John Venable - live recording engineer

== Charts ==
=== Weekly charts ===
Chart (1978)	Peak position
Australian Albums (Kent Music Report)	25
New Zealand Albums (RMNZ)	5
US Billboard 200	1

=== Year-end charts ===
Chart (1978)	Position
New Zealand Albums (RMNZ)	26
US Billboard 200	35

== Certifications ==
Region	Certification	Certified units/sales
United States (RIAA)	3× Platinum	3,000,000^{^}
^{^} Shipments figures based on certification alone.
