= Tryin' to Get the Feeling =

Studio album by Barry Manilow
- Released: October 1, 1975; 1998 (Re-release); 2006 (Second re-release)
- Studios: Sigma Sound, Philadelphia; Mediasound, New York City
- Genres: Pop, easy listening, soft rock
- Length: 44:22 (Original release); 47:56 (1998 re-release); 50:30 (2006 re-release)
- Label: Arista
- Producers: Barry Manilow, Ron Dante

Barry Manilow chronology
Barry Manilow II (1974)	Tryin' to Get the Feeling (1975)	This One's for You (1976)

Singles from Tryin' to Get the Feeling
- 1. "I Write the Songs" Released: November 1975; 2. "Tryin' to Get the Feeling Again"/"Beautiful Music" Released: 1976

"I Write the Songs"
Barry Manilow's "I Write the Songs" from Tryin' to Get the Feeling

Tryin' to Get the Feeling is the third studio album by singer-songwriter Barry Manilow, released in 1975. It features the title track, "Tryin' to Get the Feeling Again", together with other hits including "New York City Rhythm", "Bandstand Boogie" (the theme from the long-running ABC series American Bandstand) and the chart-topping "I Write the Songs". The album debuted on the Billboard Top 200 Chart on November 8, 1975, reaching number five in early 1976, and eventually was certified double platinum. It peaked at No. 24 on Canada's RPM Album Chart.

The Piano Player sculpture on the album's front cover was created by Italian artist Dino Bencini. Both front and back cover art were later parodied by Ray Stevens on the cover of his 1979 album The Feeling's Not Right Again, which contains the song "I Need Your Help, Barry Manilow".

Professional ratings
Review scores
Source	Rating
Allmusic	link
Christgau's Record Guide	C−
Rolling Stone	(unfavorable) link

== Track listing ==
=== Side one ===
1. "New York City Rhythm" (Barry Manilow, Marty Panzer) – 4:42
2. "Tryin' to Get the Feeling Again" (David Pomeranz) – 3:51
3. "Why Don't We Live Together" (Phil Galdston, Peter Thom) – 2:54
4. "Bandstand Boogie" (Manilow, Charles Albertine, Bruce Sussman) – 2:49
5. "You're Leaving Too Soon" (Manilow, Enoch Anderson) – 3:30
6. "She's a Star" (Manilow, Enoch Anderson) – 4:16

=== Side two ===
1. "I Write the Songs" (Bruce Johnston) – 3:51
2. "As Sure as I'm Standing Here" (Manilow, Adrienne Anderson) – 4:50
3. "A Nice Boy Like Me" (Manilow, Enoch Anderson) – 3:58
4. "Lay Me Down" (Larry Weiss) – 4:20
5. "Beautiful Music" (Manilow, Marty Panzer) – 4:32

=== CD Bonus Tracks ===
1. "I'll Make You Music" [bonus track on 2006 remaster] (Manilow, Adrienne Anderson) – 2:34
2. "Marry Me a Little" [bonus track on 1998 and 2006 remaster] (Stephen Sondheim) – 3:38

== Charts ==
=== Weekly charts ===
Chart (1976)	Position
Australia Albums (Kent Music Report)	59
US Billboard 200	5

=== Year-end charts ===
Chart (1976)	Position
US Billboard 200	13
Chart (1977)	Position
US Billboard 200	98

== Personnel ==
- Barry Manilow – lead and backing vocals, piano, rhythm track arrangements, string arrangements (3), "32 voices" (4)
- Alan Axelrod – keyboards
- Charlie Brown – guitar
- Sid McGinnis – guitar, pedal steel guitar (5)
- Steve Donaghey – bass
- Lee Gurst – drums, percussion
- Jimmy Maelen – bongos, congas, shaker
- The Flashy Ladies (Debra Byrd, Lorraine Mazzola, Monica Burruss) – backing vocals
- Ramona Brooks – backing vocals
- Ron Dante – background vocals
- Norman Harris – string arrangements (1, 8, 9), horn arrangements (9)
- Gerald Alters – horn and string arrangements (2, 7)
- Arif Mardin – horn arrangements (4, 11), string arrangements (6)
- T.G. Conway – arrangements (9)
- Joe Renzetti – string arrangements (10)

=== Production ===
- Producers – Barry Manilow and Ron Dante
- Engineer – Michael DeLugg
- Recorded at Sigma Sound Studios (Philadelphia, PA) and Mediasound Studios (New York, NY)
- Mastered at Sterling Sound (New York, NY).
- Cover Design – Robert L. Heimall
- Photography – Lee Gurst

== Certifications ==
Region	Certification	Certified units/sales
United States (RIAA)	2× Platinum	2,000,000^{^}
^{^} Shipments figures based on certification alone.
