= You Take My Heart Away =

1977 studio album by Shirley Bassey

Studio album by Shirley Bassey
- Released: 1977
- Genre: Vocal / MOR
- Label: United Artists
- Producer: Martin Davis

Shirley Bassey chronology
Love, Life and Feelings (1976)	You Take My Heart Away (1977)	Yesterdays (1978)

You Take My Heart Away is the 22nd studio album from Shirley Bassey, released in 1977 on the United Artists Records label. The album peaked at #34 in the UK album chart. The tracks recorded for this album are contemporary pop, soft rock songs, dating mainly from the early to mid-1970s. The title track "You Take My Heart Away", originally performed by Bill Conti, was featured in the 1976 film Rocky. Other covers versions included are: "This One's for You" from Barry Manilow, "Silly Love Songs" from Wings, which had been a #1 hit single on the Billboard Hot 100, "Stargazer" from Neil Diamond. Only one track dates from a previous era: "Can't Help Falling in Love" was recorded by Elvis Presley in 1962.

Two singles were issued from the album "I Let You Let Me Down Again" which featured "Razzle Dazzle", a non-album track, on the B-side. The second single, issued in the wake of the success of the Rocky movie, was "You Take my Heart Away" with "I Let You Let Me Down Again" issued as the B-side. You Take My Heart Away was issued originally on 33.3rpm vinyl and audio cassette with a sleeve cover photography by Ray Massey. The album was re-issued on a double CD set in 2006, by BGO Records, together with the 1978 album Yesterdays.

== Track listing ==
Side One:

1. "You Take My Heart Away" (Bill Conti, Ben Raleigh, P. McClure) – 3:21
2. "Perfect Strangers" (Neil Sedaka, Phil Cody) – 3:33
3. "Sometimes" (Henry Mancini, Felice Mancini) – 3:02
4. "This One's for You" (Barry Manilow, Marty Panzer) – 3:28
5. "Silly Love Songs" (Paul McCartney) – 3:32
6. "Stargazer" (Neil Diamond) – 2:23

Side Two:

1. "Can't Help Falling in Love" (Luigi Creatore, Hugo Peretti, George David Weiss) – 3:01
2. "I Let You Let Me Down Again" (Ed Welch) – 3:27
3. "If" (David Gates) – 3:00
4. "Come in from the Rain" (Carole Bayer Sager, Melissa Manchester) – 4:03
5. "I Need To Be in Love" (Richard Carpenter, John Bettis, Albert Hammond) – 3:29
6. "C'est La Vie" (Dennis Lambert, Brian Potter) – 2:54

Bonus track on the CD re-issue:

13. "Razzle Dazzle" (Fred Ebb, John Kander) – 2:58

== Personnel ==
- Shirley Bassey – vocalist
- Martin Davis – producer
- Arthur Greenslade – arranger, conductor
- Martin Rushent – engineer
- Ray Massey – photography
