= Daybreak (Barry Manilow song) =

Single by Barry Manilow

from the album This One's for You
- B-side: "Jump Shout Boogie"
- Released: September 1977
- Recorded: 1976
- Genre: Soft rock, pop
- Length: 3:35
- Label: Arista
- Songwriters: Barry Manilow, Adrienne Anderson
- Producers: Barry Manilow, Ron Dante

Barry Manilow singles chronology
| "Looks Like We Made It" (1977) | "Daybreak" (1977) | "It's Just Another New Year's Eve" (1978) |

"Daybreak" is an uptempo pop song by Barry Manilow. It was composed by Manilow and Adrienne Anderson and first appeared on Manilow's 1976 studio album This One's for You.

The single version was recorded live with the female backup group Lady Flash and was the second track of Side 3 on Barry Manilow Live. The song spent ten weeks on the U.S. Billboard Hot 100, debuting at number 82 the week of 1 October 1977 and peaking at number 23 the week of 19 November 1977. It also reached number 7 on the Adult Contemporary chart. On the Cash Box Top 100 it peaked at number 21 for two weeks. It was a bigger hit in Canada, on both charts in which it appeared.

The song is prominently featured in the 1994 film Serial Mom, directed by John Waters and starring Kathleen Turner.

== Critical reception ==
Billboard described the song as "lively, upbeat, [and] irresistibly buoyant." Record World said that it "has a bright, breezy pop flavor that will remind audiences of summer."

== Chart performance ==
=== Weekly charts ===
| Chart (1977) | Peak position |
|---|---|
| U.S. Billboard Hot 100 | 23 |
| U.S. Billboard Adult Contemporary | 7 |
| U.S. Cashbox Top 100 | 21 |
| U.S. Radio & Records | 16 |
| Canadian RPM Top Singles | 20 |
| Canadian RPM Adult Contemporary | 4 |

=== Year-end charts ===
| Chart (1977) | Rank |
|---|---|
| Canada | 157 |
| U.S. (Joel Whitburn's Pop Annual) | 148 |
