= This One's for You (Barry Manilow album) =

Studio album by Barry Manilow
- Released: August 1976
- Studios: Mediasound, New York City
- Genres: Pop, soft rock
- Length: 38:48
- Label: Arista
- Producers: Barry Manilow, Ron Dante

Barry Manilow chronology
Tryin' to Get the Feeling (1975)	This One's for You (1976)	Barry Manilow Live (1977)

Singles from This One's for You
- 1. "This One's for You" Released: 1976; 2. "Weekend in New England" Released: 1976; 3. "Looks Like We Made It"/"New York City Rhythm (Live)" Released: April 20, 1977

Professional ratings
Review scores
Source	Rating
AllMusic	4.5/5 stars
Rolling Stone	(mixed)

This One's For You is the fourth studio album by American singer-songwriter Barry Manilow released in 1976. The album went 2× platinum and yielded the hits "This One's for You", "Weekend in New England", "Looks Like We Made It", and the original version of "Daybreak". The album debuted on the Billboard Top LPs chart on August 21, 1976, peaking at number six in 1977. The album peaked at number 24 for two weeks on Canada's RPM albums chart.

== Track listing ==
All music by Barry Manilow, except where indicated

=== Side one ===
1. "This One's for You" (lyrics: Marty Panzer) - 3:25
2. "Daybreak" (lyrics: Adrienne Anderson - 3:10
3. "You Oughta Be Home with Me" (lyrics: Adrienne Anderson - 3:13
4. "Jump Shout Boogie" (lyrics: Bruce Sussman) - 3:03
5. "Weekend in New England" (Randy Edelman) - 3:43

=== Side two ===
1. "Riders to the Stars" (lyrics: Adrienne Anderson - 3:47
2. "Let Me Go" (lyrics: Marty Panzer) - 3:58
3. "Looks Like We Made It" (music: Richard Kerr; lyrics: Will Jennings) - 3:33
4. "Say the Words" (lyrics: Barry Manilow) - 2:53
5. "All the Time" (lyrics: Barry Manilow, Marty Panzer) - 3:15
6. "(Why Don't You) See the Show Again" (lyrics: Adrienne Anderson - 4:32

=== CD bonus tracks (2006) ===
1. "Don't Throw It All Away" - 3:22
2. "Can't Go Back Anymore" - 3:20
3. "This Is Fine" - 3:14
4. "I Really Do Write the Songs" - 2:25

== Personnel ==
- Barry Manilow - vocals, piano, arrangements
- Dennis Farac, Richard Resnicoff, David Spinozza, Jerry Friedman - guitar
- Steven Donaghey, Will Lee - bass guitar
- Alan Axelrod, Paul Shaffer - keyboards
- Lee Gurst, Ronnie Zito - drums
- Carlos Martin - percussion
- Debra Byrd, Lady Flash, Monica Burruss, Ron Dante - backing vocals
- Gerald Atlers, Charlie Calello, Van McCoy, Dick Behrke - orchestration

Technical

- Michael DeLugg - recording engineer
- Lee Gurst - cover design, photography

== Certifications ==
Region	Certification	Certified units/sales
United States (RIAA)	2× Platinum	2,000,000^{^}
^{^} Shipments figures based on certification alone.
