= Night Songs (Barry Manilow album) =

Studio album by Barry Manilow
- Released: March 25, 2014
- Studio: Ignited Now Studios (Los Angeles, California); O'Henry Sound Studios (Burbank, California); Pepper Tree Studios (Palm Springs, California)
- Genre: Vocal pop; adult contemporary
- Length: 46:27
- Label: Stiletto Entertainment
- Producer: Barry Manilow

Barry Manilow chronology
15 Minutes (2011)	Night Songs (2014)	This Is My Town: Songs of New York (2017)

Night Songs is a studio album by Barry Manilow, released by Stiletto Entertainment on March 25, 2014. The album reached peak positions of number eight on the Billboard 200 and number three on Billboard's Top Independent Albums chart, and earned Manilow a Grammy Award nomination for Best Traditional Pop Vocal Album with the award that year going to Tony Bennett and Lady Gaga for their album Cheek to Cheek.

== Track listing ==
1. "I Fall in Love Too Easily" (Sammy Cahn, Jule Styne) - 2:53
2. "Alone Together" (Arthur Schwartz, Howard Dietz) – 3:02
3. "Blame It on My Youth" (Oscar Levant, Edward Heyman) - 2:45
4. "I Get Along Without You Very Well" (Hoagy Carmichael) - 2:33
5. "You're Getting to Be a Habit with Me" (Al Dubin, Harry Warren) - 2:06
6. "It Amazes Me" (Cy Coleman, Carolyn Leigh) - 4:05
7. "But Not for Me" (George Gershwin, Ira Gershwin) - 2:10
8. "It's a New World" (Harold Arlen, Ira Gershwin) - 2:37
9. "While We're Young" (William Engvick, Morty Palitz, Alec Wilder) - 2:37
10. "You Don't Know What Love Is" (Gene DePaul, Don Raye) - 2:50
11. "Ac-Cent-Tchu-Ate the Positive" (Harold Arlen, Johnny Mercer) - 2:43
12. "My One and Only Love" (Robert Mellin, Guy Wood) - 3:58
13. "I've Never Been in Love Before" (Frank Loesser) - 2:00
14. "I Walk a Little Faster" (Cy Coleman, Carolyn Leigh) - 4:21
15. "Here's That Rainy Day" (Johnny Burke, Jimmy Van Heusen) - 2:55
16. "Some Other Time" (Leonard Bernstein, Betty Comden, Adolph Green) - 3:13

== Personnel ==
- Barry Manilow – vocals, grand piano, arrangements

Production

- Garry C. Kief – executive producer
- Barry Manilow – producer
- Marc Hulett – associate producer
- Greg Bartheld – recording, digital audio editing
- David Benson – recording (1–5, 7–10, 12, 13)
- Jerry Napier – additional engineer
- Bill Schnee – mixing at Schnee Studios (North Hollywood, California)
- Sangwook Nam – mastering at Jacob's Well Mastering (West Lebanon, New Hampshire)
- Dale Voelker – art direction
- Gregg Segal – photography
