= It's Just Another New Year's Eve =

Single by Barry Manilow

from the album Barry Manilow Live
- Released: 1977
- Length: 4:21
- Label: Arista
- Songwriters: Barry Manilow, Marty Panzer

"It's Just Another New Year's Eve" is a song recorded by Barry Manilow and written by Manilow with Marty Panzer. It was followed by the single "Can't Smile Without You".

The song appears on Manilow's 1977 album Barry Manilow Live. The single reached number 33 on the Billboard Adult Contemporary chart that year.

Panzer recalled that Manilow wanted to write this song specifically for his Uris Theatre run, during which his live album was being recorded: "We wrote the song on Monday… it was orchestrated on Tuesday… and recorded on Wednesday."

Manilow performed "It's Just Another New Year's Eve" live at midnight on Dick Clark's New Year's Rockin' Eve numerous times.
