= This One's for You (Barry Manilow song) =

Single by Barry Manilow

from the album This One's for You
- B-side: "Riders to the Stars"
- Released: September 1976
- Length: 3:25
- Label: Arista
- Songwriters: Barry Manilow, Marty Panzer
- Producers: Barry Manilow, Ron Dante

Barry Manilow singles chronology
"Tryin' to Get the Feeling Again" (1976)	"This One's for You" (1976)	"Weekend in New England" (1976)

"This One's for You" is the title track from the 1976 album by Barry Manilow with words and music by Manilow and Marty Panzer. The song peaked at number 29 on the Billboard Hot 100, and at number one on the Easy Listening chart, reaching the top position for one week in November 1976, Manilow's fifth number one overall on that chart.

An early version of the song appears on Manilow's compilation box set, The Complete Collection and Then Some....

== Reception ==
Cash Box said that the song "is perfectly constructed with a commercial feeling in mind" and "a lovely ballad, with touching lyric." Record World said that it is "sung with [Manilow's] inimitable flair."

Chicago radio superstation WLS, which gave the song much airplay, ranked "This One's for You" as the 66th most popular hit of 1976. It reached as high as number seven on their survey of November 6, 1976.

== Chart performance ==
=== Weekly charts ===
Chart (1976)	Peak position
Canada Top Singles (RPM)	28
Canada Adult Contemporary (RPM)	1
US Billboard Hot 100	29
US Adult Contemporary (Billboard)	1
US Cash Box Top 100	21
US Radio & Records	23

=== Year-end charts ===
Chart (1976)	Rank
Canadian RPM Top Singles	193
U.S. (Joel Whitburn's Pop Annual)	170

== Cover versions ==
- Shirley Bassey on her 1977 album, You Take My Heart Away.
- Teddy Pendergrass for his 1982 album of the same name.
- Filipino singer Kuh Ledesma covered this song in medley with Elton John's breakthrough hit "Your Song" in 1983.
- Ray Fisher, an American singer in Northern California, released the song on his album, Forever Fanilow, in May of 2023 to celebrate the 50th anniversary of Barry Manilow's first album release and 80th birthday.

== See also ==
- List of number-one adult contemporary singles of 1976 (U.S.)
