= 2:00 AM Paradise Cafe =

Studio album by Barry Manilow
- Released: November 15, 1984
- Genre: Jazz pop; traditional pop; lounge
- Length: 49:15
- Label: Arista
- Producer: Barry Manilow

Barry Manilow chronology
Greatest Hits Vol. II (1983)	2:00 AM Paradise Cafe (1984)	Copacabana: Soundtrack (1985)

Professional ratings
Review scores
Source	Rating
Allmusic	4/5 stars
The Rolling Stone Album Guide	2/5 stars

2:00 AM Paradise Cafe is the tenth studio album by singer-songwriter Barry Manilow, released in 1984 on Arista Records. The album peaked at No. 28 on the Billboard 200 and went Gold in the United States.

== Background ==
Johnny Mercer's widow, Ginger, entrusted Manilow with a cache of Mercer's lyrics that had never been set to music, although Manilow used only Mercer's "When October Goes" for the project. He recruited veteran jazz musicians Bill Mays, Gerry Mulligan, Shelly Manne, Mundell Lowe, and George Duvivier for the album. Also enlisted for vocal duets were Mel Tormé and Sarah Vaughan. The entire album was rehearsed for three days, then recorded entirely live (in one take) without overdubs at Westlake Studio 'C' in Los Angeles, California.

== Track listing ==
All music is composed by Barry Manilow.

Side one
No.	Title	Lyrics	Length
1.	"Paradise Cafe"	Bruce Sussman, Jack Feldman	5:23
2.	"Where Have You Gone"	Adrienne Anderson	4:35
3.	"Say No More"	Adrienne Anderson	4:06
4.	"Blue" (with Sarah Vaughan)	Bruce Sussman, Jack Feldman	4:16
5.	"When October Goes"	Johnny Mercer	4:04

Side two
No.	Title	Lyrics	Length
1.	"What Am I Doin' Here"	Marty Panzer	3:17
2.	"Goodbye My Love"	Adrienne Anderson	4:25
3.	"Big City Blues" (with Mel Tormé)	Adrienne Anderson	4:14
4.	"When Love Is Gone"	Lisa Sennett	4:17
5.	"I've Never Been So Low on Love"	Marty Panzer	4:26
6.	"Night Song"	Bruce Sussman, Jack Feldman	4:28

== Charts ==
Chart (1984/85)	Position
United States (Billboard 200)	28
Australia (Kent Music Report)	100
United Kingdom (Official Charts Company)	28

== Personnel ==
- Barry Manilow – vocals, acoustic piano
- Bill Mays – acoustic piano, Rhodes electric piano
- Mundell Lowe – guitar
- George Duvivier – double bass
- Shelly Manne – drums
- Gerry Mulligan – baritone saxophone
- Sarah Vaughan – vocals (4)
- Mel Tormé – vocals (8)

== Production ==
- Barry Manilow – producer, arrangements, logo design
- Michael Braunstein – recording
- Deni King – assistant engineer
- Greg Laney – second assistant engineer
- Eric Borenstein – album coordinator
- Roger Wall – personal assistant
- Shaun Harris – music contractor
- Ria Lewerke – art direction
- Sue Reilly – logo design
- Leon Lecash – front cover photography
- Jay Thompson – back cover photography
- Charles Mercuri – grooming

== Certifications ==
Region	Certification	Certified units/sales
United Kingdom (BPI)	Silver	60,000^{^}
United States (RIAA)	Gold	500,000^{^}
^{^} Shipments figures based on certification alone.
