= Lady Flash =

American trio of singers

Lady Flash was an American trio of singers whose members were Reparata Mazzola (born Lorraine Mazzola), Monica Burruss Pege (stage name: Monica Burruss, formerly of The Voices of East Harlem), and Debra Byrd. They were the featured backup group for Barry Manilow from 1974–1979 and released one hit of their own, 1976's "Street Singin'". The tune, which was written and arranged by Manilow, reached #27 on the Billboard Hot 100 record chart. The song came from their album, Beauties In The Night which was also produced by Manilow.

Originally called The Flashy Ladies, a reference to Flashy Lady by Marty Panzer and Ron Dante, a song on Manilow's first album, the trio (with Ramona Brooks, whom Pege replaced in 1976) sang backing vocals for Manilow in live performance and on his first seven multiple platinum albums. Their first recorded appearance was in 1975 on Soundstage. They later appeared with Manilow on his Emmy-award-winning first special and on numerous TV shows including Don Kirshner's Rock Concert, The Midnight Special, American Bandstand and Donahue. They performed with Manilow on his first European tour in 1978 with concerts at the Olympia in Paris, The London Palladium and Royal Albert Hall in London, and the Concertgebouw, Amsterdam.

Because Pege and Byrd were African-American, and Reparata, in the middle position, was Caucasian, Manilow often jokingly referred to them as "The Oreos."

Since its inception, Debra Byrd was the vocal coach for contestants on American Idol for 11 years, later joining as coach for The Voice. In addition to singing on sessions in Los Angeles, including the Oscars, she was the vocal chair for the Musicians Institute in Los Angeles. Byrd died in Los Angeles on March 5, 2024 at age 72.

Monica Pege sang with Barry Manilow again from 2004 to 2010 in Las Vegas at the Hilton and his Colosseum shows. In 1984, Pege was crowned the Female Vocalist grand champion on the debut season of Star Search.

Reparata Mazzola was previously a member of Reparata and the Delrons under the name Lorraine Mazzola. She changed her legal name to Reparata after losing a 1975 case against Mary "Reparata" (née Aiese) O'Leary over the right to the stage name. Currently, Mazzola is a screenwriter and lives in Los Angeles.
