= When October Goes =

Song by Barry Manilow

Single by Barry Manilow

from the album 2:00 AM Paradise Cafe
- B-side: "Paradise Cafe"
- Released: 1984
- Length: 3:59
- Label: Arista
- Composer: Barry Manilow
- Lyricist: Johnny Mercer
- Producer: Barry Manilow

"When October Goes" is a ballad based on a lyric Johnny Mercer had written but did not complete. It was matched up to a melody by Barry Manilow and released in 1984, peaking at number 6 in the Billboard Adult Contemporary chart.

== Background ==
In his last year, as he was dying from brain cancer, Mercer became extremely fond of Manilow, in part because Manilow's first hit record was the song "Mandy", which was the nickname of Mercer's daughter Amanda. After Mercer's death, his widow, Ginger Mehan Mercer, arranged to give some unfinished lyrics he had written to Manilow to possibly develop into complete songs. Among these was "When October Goes." Manilow composed the song with Mercer's lyric and issued it as a single in 1984. The song first appeared on Manilow's album 2:00 AM Paradise Cafe.

This is also the title of an album put out by Rounder Records and produced by Christine Lavin, which features the title song and other fall-related songs by various singers/songwriters.

== Covers ==
The song has since been recorded by Rebecca Parris, Kevin Mahogany, Rosemary Clooney, Nancy Wilson, Betty Buckley, Audrey Morris, Megon McDonough, Julie Budd (arranged by Herb Bernstein), Nancy LaMott (arranged by Christopher Marlowe). Thomas Anders (of Modern Talking fame) recorded his version in 1997 on the album Live Concert. Lea Salonga performed the song on her album Inspired.
