= I Write the Songs =

1975 song written by Bruce Johnston

Song by Captain & Tennille

from the album Love Will Keep Us Together
- Released: May 23, 1975
- Genre: Pop, adult contemporary
- Label: A&M
- Songwriter: Bruce Johnston
- Producer: Daryl Dragon

Audio Recording
- " I Write The Songs - The Captain & Tennille (1975)" on YouTube

"I Write the Songs"

Single by David Cassidy

from the album The Higher They Climb
- B-side: "Get It Up for Love"
- Released: May 1975
- Recorded: 1975
- Genre: Pop
- Length: 4:07
- Label: RCA
- Songwriter: Bruce Johnston
- Producer: Bruce Johnston

David Cassidy singles chronology
"Daydreamer" (1973)	"I Write the Songs" (1975)	"Darlin'" (1975)

"I Write the Songs"

Single by Barry Manilow

from the album Tryin' to Get the Feeling
- B-side: "A Nice Boy Like Me"
- Released: November 1975
- Recorded: 1975
- Genre: Soft rock
- Length: 3:39 (single version); 3:51 (album version)
- Label: Arista 0157
- Songwriter: Bruce Johnston
- Producers: Ron Dante; Barry Manilow

Barry Manilow singles chronology
"Could It Be Magic" (1975)	"I Write the Songs" (1975)	"Tryin' to Get the Feeling Again" (1976)

"I Write the Songs"

Song by Bruce Johnston

from the album Going Public
- Released: May 1977
- Genre: Pop rock
- Length: 4:05
- Label: Columbia
- Songwriter: Bruce Johnston
- Producer: Gary Usher

"I Write the Songs" is a popular song written by Bruce Johnston. Barry Manilow's version reached number one on the Billboard Hot 100 chart in January 1976 after spending two weeks atop the Billboard adult contemporary chart in December 1975. It won a Grammy Award for Song of the Year and was nominated for Record of the Year in 1977. Billboard ranked it as the No. 13 song of 1976.

The original version was recorded by Captain & Tennille, who worked with Johnston in the early 1970s with the Beach Boys. It appears on their 1975 album Love Will Keep Us Together. The first release of "I Write the Songs" as a single was by teen idol David Cassidy from his 1975 solo album The Higher They Climb, produced by Johnston. Cassidy's version reached number 11 on the UK Singles Chart in August of that year. After Manilow's hit, Johnston recorded the song for his 1977 album Going Public.

Johnston has stated that, for him, the "I" in the song is God, and that songs come from the spirit of creativity in everyone. He has said that the song is not about his Beach Boys bandmate Brian Wilson.

Manilow was initially reluctant to record the song, stating in his autobiography Sweet Life: "The problem with the song was that if you didn't listen carefully to the lyric, you would think that the singer was singing about himself. It could be misinterpreted as a monumental ego trip." After persuasion by Clive Davis, then president of Arista Records, Manilow recorded the song, and his version of "I Write the Songs" was the first single taken from the album Tryin' to Get the Feeling. It first charted on the Billboard Hot 100 on November 15, 1975, reaching the top of the chart nine weeks later, on January 17, 1976. Cash Box said of Manilow's version "Good work Barry" describing the song as "melodic, ballad-like beginning grows into an operatic crescendo, all done in clear production that all age groups will appreciate." Record World called it "an uplifting production number" and "perhaps [Manilow's] strongest offering since 'Mandy.'"

"I Write the Songs"
Barry Manilow's "I Write the Songs" from Tryin' to Get the Feeling

== Charts ==
=== Weekly charts ===
David Cassidy

Chart (1975)	Peak position
Australia (Kent Music Report)	85
Ireland (IRMA)	13
UK Singles Chart	11

Barry Manilow cover

Chart (1975–1976)	Peak position
Australia (Kent Music Report)	5
Canada Top Singles (RPM)	3
Canada Adult Contemporary (RPM)	2
Ireland (IRMA)	11
New Zealand (RIANZ)	13
South Africa (Springbok)	5
US Billboard Hot 100	1
US Adult Contemporary (Billboard)	1

=== Year-end charts ===
Chart (1976)	Rank
Australia (Kent Music Report)	52
Canada	49
US Billboard Hot 100	13
US Billboard Easy Listening	5

=== All-time charts ===
Chart (1958–2018)	Position
US Billboard Hot 100	185

== Popularity ==
After his version reached number one, Manilow himself composed a novelty song based on this song which he recorded under the title "I Really Do Write the Songs" in which he sings about how he composes each part of a song and the line "Sometimes I really do write the songs" at the end of each verse. In the finale, he sings, "sometimes...ah, what the hell...I write the songs." Unreleased at the time, it was included as a bonus track on the reissue of his album This One's for You in 2006.

It was covered by Frank Sinatra as "I Sing the Songs".

== See also ==
- List of number-one adult contemporary singles of 1975 (U.S.)
- List of Hot 100 number-one singles of 1976 (U.S.)
