= Tryin' to Get the Feeling Again =

1975 song written by David Pomeranz

Single by Barry Manilow

from the album Tryin' to Get the Feeling
- B-side: "Beautiful Music"
- Released: March 1976
- Genre: Soft rock
- Length: 3:51
- Label: Arista
- Songwriter: David Pomeranz
- Producers: Barry Manilow, Ron Dante

Barry Manilow singles chronology
"I Write the Songs" (1975)	"Tryin' to Get the Feeling Again" (1976)	"This One's for You" (1976)

"Tryin' to Get the Feeling Again" is a song written by David Pomeranz that became a top 10 hit for Barry Manilow in 1976. It was first recorded by the Carpenters in 1975, but their version was not released until 1994 on their 25th anniversary CD, Interpretations: A 25th Anniversary Celebration. Pomeranz also recorded the song for his 1975 album It's in Every One of Us (Arista Records).

== Barry Manilow version ==
Manilow released his recording, a single from the album Tryin' to Get the Feeling, in 1976. It peaked at number 10 on the Billboard Hot 100 and number 1 on the Adult Contemporary chart. An alternate version, including the original bridge, nearly a minute longer, appears on The Complete Collection and Then Some... Manilow says the bridge was eliminated in his release for timing reasons, but he tries to include it when performing live.

Record World said that "this lush ballad will speak directly to a large audience."

== Chart performance ==
=== Weekly charts ===
Chart (1976)	Peak position
Canada Top Singles (RPM)	13
Canada Adult Contemporary (RPM)	1
US Billboard Hot 100	10
US Adult Contemporary (Billboard)	1
US Cash Box Top 100	10

=== Year-end charts ===
Chart (1976)	Rank
Canadian RPM Top Singles	123
US Billboard Hot 100	95
US Billboard Easy Listening	44
US Cash Box	79

== Carpenters' version ==
"Tryin' to Get the Feeling Again"

Single by Carpenters

from the album Interpretations
- Released: December 12, 1994
- Recorded: 1975
- Genre: Pop, soft rock
- Label: A&M; 1940
- Songwriter: David Pomeranz
- Producer: Richard Carpenter

Carpenters singles chronology
"Let Me Be the One" (1991)	"Tryin' to Get the Feeling Again" (1994)	"The Rainbow Connection" (2001)

The Carpenters' version of "Tryin' to Get the Feeling Again" was recorded during the Horizon sessions in 1975, but it had been shelved as there were "one too many ballads". Years later, Richard was looking for the master backing track for "Only Yesterday" and discovered on that same tape the lost, earlier attempt at "Tryin' to Get the Feeling Again" with Karen's "work lead". (A work lead can easily be identified by such anomalies as Karen flipping a sheet of paper over at about 1:50 into the play time as she sight-reads and sings.) Richard felt that the vocal was good enough to finish production and release the song, as he did in 1994, almost 20 years after it was recorded. The Carpenters' version includes the original bridge.

=== Personnel ===
- Karen Carpenter – lead and backing vocals
- Richard Carpenter – backing vocals, keyboards
- Joe Osborn – bass guitar
- Jim Gordon – drums
- Tim May – guitar

== Charts ==
Chart (1994)	Peak position
Scottish Singles Sales (Official Charts)	50
UK Singles (Official Charts)	48

== Original David Pomeranz version ==
Pomeranz wrote the song during a time of stress in his marriage, referring to its ups and downs. He notes that he rewrote the song several times, and that his version, the Manilow version, and the Carpenters version each include different verses.

== Additional versions ==
- Gene Pitney, 1975, Pitney '75 (Bronze)
- Stephanie De-Sykes, 1975, (single, 20th Century)
- Hubert Laws (flute), 1976, Romeo & Juliet (Columbia)
- Dee Dee Sharp Gamble, 1977, What Color Is Love (Philadelphia International)
- Ray Fisher, 2023, Forever Fanilow

- Harriet, 2024, Tryin' to Get the Feeling Again

== See also ==
- List of number-one adult contemporary singles of 1976 (U.S.)
