= Looks Like We Made It =

Single by Barry Manilow

from the album This One's For You
- B-side: "New York City Rhythm (Live)"
- Released: April 20, 1977
- Genre: Soft rock
- Length: 3:33
- Label: Arista
- Songwriters: Richard Kerr and Will Jennings
- Producers: Barry Manilow, Ron Dante

Barry Manilow singles chronology
"Weekend in New England" (1976)	"Looks Like We Made It" (1977)	"Daybreak" (1977)

"Looks Like We Made It" is a song by American singer Barry Manilow, from his 1976 album This One's for You, composed by Richard Kerr with lyrics by Will Jennings. The single was released April 20, 1977.

== Overview ==
The song was first released in 1976 on Barry Manilow's album This One's for You, and was issued as a single in 1977 where it reached the number one spot on both the U.S. Billboard Hot 100, and the U.S. Adult Contemporary chart. It is ranked as the 37th greatest U.S. hit of 1977. It became Manilow's third of five gold records, and his third and final Billboard number one hit.

Despite the optimism suggested by the song's title, the narrator is actually ruminating on the fact that he and his ex-lover have finally found happiness and fulfillment—though not with each other. They have, indeed, "made it," but apart, not together. Songwriter Will Jennings commented,

Richard [Kerr] and I have often remarked on the people, millions of them in the world, who misunderstood the lyric of "Looks Like We Made It." It is a rather sad and ironic lyric about making it apart and not together, and of course everyone thinks it is a full on, positive statement. I don't know. Perhaps it is... in a way.

== Reception ==
Cash Box called it "a stately ballad with a sad story," saying that it "reverberates with a gargantuan choir that pushes to a towering, dynamic finale."

The song was featured in the 1996 Friends season 2 episode "The One After the Superbowl". The song subsequently featured in a 2012 Super Bowl commercial for Chevrolet.

== Chart performance ==
=== Weekly charts ===
Chart (1977)	Peak position
Canada Top Singles (RPM)	8
Canada Adult Contemporary (RPM)	1
US Billboard Hot 100	1
US Adult Contemporary (Billboard)	1

=== Year-end charts ===
Chart (1977)	Rank
U.S. Billboard Hot 100	37
U.S. Billboard Adult Contemporary	7
Canada (RPM) Top Singles	81

== Track listing ==
- 7" AS 0244
1. "Looks Like We Made It" – 3:33
2. "New York City Rhythm (Live)"

== Other recordings ==
- Facts of Life on their 1977 album Sometimes
- Christopher Wheat on his 2013 album Breaking the Waves

== See also ==
- List of Hot 100 number-one singles of 1977 (U.S.)
- List of number-one adult contemporary singles of 1977 (U.S.)
- "You're Still the One" by Shania Twain opens with this lyric
