= This Is My Town: Songs of New York =

Studio album by Barry Manilow
- Released: April 21, 2017
- Studios: Capitol Studios (Hollywood, California); Schnee Studios (North Hollywood, California); Pepper Tree Studios (Palm Springs, California); Ignited Now Studios (Los Angeles, California); Woodcliff Studio (Sherman Oaks, California)
- Genres: Pop rock; jazz; vocal music
- Length: 37:39
- Labels: Decca, Stiletto
- Producers: Barry Manilow; David Benson; Michael Lloyd (Track 3)

Barry Manilow chronology
My Dream Duets (2014)	This Is My Town: Songs of New York (2017)	Night Songs II (2020)

This Is My Town: Songs of New York is a studio album by American singer-songwriter Barry Manilow, released on April 21, 2017 by Decca Records and Stiletto Entertainment. The album celebrates Barry Manilow's hometown New York City by "saying thanks to the city for giving me my ambition, my sense of humor and my decency", according to Manilow. It consists both of new original Manilow compositions and standards "evoking the spirit and energy of New York City".

== Track listing ==
All tracks produced by Barry Manilow and co-produced by David Benson; except "Coney Island" co-produced by Michael Lloyd.

No.	Title	Writer(s)	Length
1.	"This Is My Town"	Barry Manilow, Bruce Sussman	2:59
2.	"New York City Rhythm" / "On Broadway"	Manilow, Barry Mann, Cynthia Weil, Jerry Leiber, Mike Stoller, Marty Panzer	3:57
3.	"Coney Island"	Manilow	3:00
4.	"Lonely Town"	Leonard Bernstein, Betty Comden, Adolph Green	5:00
5.	"Lovin' at Birdland"	Manilow, Adrienne Anderson	3:29
6.	"Downtown / Uptown"	Mann, Cynthia Weil, Tony Hatch	3:20
7.	"On the Roof"	Manilow	3:19
8.	"I Dig New York"	Manilow, Sussman	2:54
9.	"The Brooklyn Bridge" (featuring Mel Tormé)	Sammy Cahn, Jule Styne	2:44
10.	"NYC Medley"	Billy Joel, Burton Lane, Denny Randell, James Blake, Leonard Bernstein, Ralph Freed, Richard Rodgers, Sandy Linzer, Shawn Carter, Adolph Green, Alicia Keys, Charles B. Lawlor, Fred Ebb, Lorenz Hart, Angela Hunte, Betty Comden, Al Shuckburgh, Sylvia Robinson, Janet Sewell-Ulepic, Bert Keyes, John Kander	6:57

== Personnel ==
Rhythm Section and Vocalists

- Barry Manilow – vocals, backing vocals, acoustic piano, arrangements (1–8, 10), all 20 vocals (7)
- Randy Kerber – acoustic piano
- Michael Lang – acoustic piano
- Greg Phillinganes – acoustic piano
- Greg Bartheld – programming
- David Benson – programming
- Ken Berry – guitars
- Jim Fox – guitars
- Paul Jackson Jr. – guitars
- Dean Parks – guitars
- Chuck Berghofer – bass
- Nathan East – bass
- Will Lee – bass
- Gregg Bissonette – drums
- Gregg Field – drums
- Harvey Mason – drums
- John Robinson – drums
- Emil Richards – percussion
- Michael Lloyd – arrangements (3)
- Don Sebesky – arrangements (8)
- Randy Crenshaw – backing vocals
- Ron Dante – backing vocals
- Fletcher Sheridan – backing vocals
- Mel Tormé – vocals (9)

Orchestra

- Doug Walter – orchestration and conductor (1, 4, 6, 10), conductor (5)
- Kevin Bassinon – orchestration and conductor (2)
- Don Sebesky – orchestration (5, 8)
- Ron Walters Jr. – orchestration and conductor (8)
- Joe Soldo – orchestra contractor
- Ralph Morrison – concertmaster
- Jonathan Barracks Griffiths – music librarian

Horn section

- Dan Higgins, Sal Lozano and Don Shelton – alto saxophone
- Glen Berger and Gene Cipriano – baritone saxophone
- Glen Berger, Jeff Driskill, Bob Sheppard, Joseph Stone and Vince Trombetta – tenor saxophone
- Ben Devitt and Craig Gosnell – bass trombone
- Steve Baxter, Bob McChesney, Charlie Morillas and Dave Ryan – trombone
- Wayne Bergeron, Dan Fornero, Gary Grant, Chris Gray, Rob Schaer and Michael Stever – trumpet
- Jim Atkinson and Paul Klintworth – French horn

String section

- Ira Glansbeek, Armen Ksajikian, Timothy Loo, Tina Soule, Cecilia Tsan and John Walz – cello
- Julie Berghofer – harp
- Robert Brophy, Alma Fernandez, Matt Funes, Luke Maurer and Rodney Wirtz – viola
- Darius Campo, Ron Clark, Kevin Connolly, Joel Derouin, Lisa Dondlinger, Nina Eutuhov, Neel Hammond, Marisa Kuney, Liane Mautner, Cindy Moussas, Sara Parkins, Radu Pieptea, Neil Samples, Jenny Takamatsu and Ina Veil – violin

== Production ==
- Garry C. Kief – executive producer
- Barry Manilow – producer
- David Benson – co-producer
- Michael Lloyd – producer (3)
- Greg Bartheld – associate producer
- Marc Hulett – associate producer
- Allison Joyce – A&R coordination
- Evelyn Morgan – A&R administration
- Tom Arndt – production manager
- Mandy Dallacorte – product manager
- Julie Johantgen – release coordinator
- Josh Cheuse – art direction
- Michelle Holme – design
- Mark Seliger – photography

Technical

- Sangwook Nam – mastering at Jacob's Well Mastering (West Lebanon, New Hampshire)
- Greg Bartheld – recording (1, 2, 4–10), Pro Tools editing (1, 2, 4–10), mixing (2, 4, 6–8, 10)
- David Benson – recording (1, 2, 4–10), Pro Tools editing (1, 2, 4–10), mixing (2, 4, 6–8, 10)
- Bruce Botnick – recording (1, 2, 4–10)
- Barry Manilow – recording (1, 2, 4–10)
- Frank Rosato – recording (1, 2, 4–10)
- Dae Bennett – mixing (1)
- Bill Schnee – mixing (2, 4–6, 8–10)
- Michael Lloyd – recording (3), mixing (3)
- Rick Silva – Mel Tormé audio isolation engineer (9), audio mixing (9)
- Ed Stryker – Mel Tormé hi resolution audio capturing engineer (9)
- Nolan Bateman – assistant engineer (1, 2, 4–10)
- Chandler Harrod – assistant engineer (1, 2, 4–10)
