= Weekend in New England =

Single by Barry Manilow

from the album This One's for You
- B-side: "Say the Words"
- Released: November 1976
- Genre: Orchestral pop, soft rock
- Length: 3:43
- Label: Arista
- Songwriter: Randy Edelman
- Producers: Barry Manilow, Ron Dante

Barry Manilow singles chronology
| "This One's for You" (1976) | "Weekend in New England" (1976) | "Looks Like We Made It" (1977) |

"Weekend in New England" is a song recorded by Barry Manilow for his fourth studio album, This One's for You (1976). Written by Randy Edelman, it was released as the second single from the album, and became a Top Ten hit on the Billboard Hot 100, while topping the Adult Contemporary chart.

== Content ==
The song's title does not occur in its lyrics but is referenced in the first line of the second verse: "Time in New England took me away", the evident basis of "Weekend in New England" being the leisure habits of New Yorkers for whom "the romantic short escape of choice has long been a drive up the coast towards Massachusetts and the other [New England] states", lyrical descriptions of "long rocky beaches and you by the bay" indicating a seaside getaway. The song's narrator, on his first day "back in the city where nothing is clear", fondly remembers the romance of the weekend just past, and yearns to be reunited with the person he met in New England (or vacationed there with).

== Background ==
Composer Randy Edelman made the first recording of his song for his 1975 album Farewell Fairbanks, the track—entitled "A Weekend in New England"—serving as B-side for the single "Concrete and Clay". Prior to "Weekend in New England" being recorded by Barry Manilow (and subsequently by other artists), Edelman modified the song's melody at the behest of Arista Records president Clive Davis, to whose attention Roger Birnbaum, then a West Coast A&R man for Arista, had brought Edelman's original version. Davis recalled, "The choruses were beautiful, but the verses needed to be [more] accessible melodically. So I asked Edelman to rewrite the melody of the verses, and if it came out strong, I would ask Manilow to record it."

Edelman recalled doing UK promotion for "Concrete and Clay" when he received a long-distance phone call from Davis soliciting "Weekend in New England" for Manilow: "[Davis went] off on a detailed discussion of why the harmonics in the verse didn't work [but] in [such] a way that I didn't feel that my creativity was being challenged." Although, in Edelman's recollection, Davis indicated that Manilow would record "Weekend in New England" with or without Davis' suggested modifications. Edelman recounted, "It was just that he thought some simplification could really make it a hit. And he was right." Edelman provided Davis with a customized verse melody for "Weekend in New England" a week later.

== Personnel ==
- Barry Manilow – vocals, piano
- Richard Resnicoff – guitar
- Steven Donaghey – bass guitar
- Alan Axelrod – keyboards
- Lee Gurst – drums
- Gerald Atlers – orchestration

== Reception ==
At the time of the August 1976 release of its parent album: This One's for You, "Weekend in New England" was passed over as lead single but was earmarked for future single release. Subsequent to the surprising underperformance of the album's title cut as a single—"This One's For You" rose no higher than no. 29 on the Billboard Hot 100—"Weekend in New England" had its single release in November 1976. It afforded Manilow a considerable Top 40 comeback, entering the Top 20 on the Hot 100 of January 29, 1977. However, "Weekend in New England" did not become one of Manilow's top hits, as its ultimate Hot 100 peak was at no. 10. It did maintain Manilow's virtual "lock" on the no. 1 position of the Billboard Adult Contemporary chart, while the third single release from This One's For You, "Looks Like We Made It", returned Manilow to the top of the Hot 100 for the third time.

Cash Box said "a piano plays in the foreground, the vocal is strong and right to the point" and "the production is overflowing with horns and strings." Record World called it a "sweeping ballad delivered in the style that has made [Manilow] one of the country's leading male vocalists."

== Chart performance ==
=== Weekly charts ===
| Chart (1976–1977) | Peak position |
|---|---|
| US Billboard Hot 100 | 10 |
| US Adult Contemporary (Billboard) | 1 |
| U.S. Cashbox Top 100 | 9 |
| Canada Top Singles (RPM) | 9 |
| Canada RPM Adult Contemporary | 1 |

=== Year-end charts ===
| Chart (1977) | Rank |
|---|---|
| Canada Top Singles (RPM) | 97 |
| U.S. Billboard Hot 100 | 65 |
| U.S. Billboard Adult Contemporary | 31 |
| U.S. Cash Box | 12 |

== Subsequent versions ==
"Weekend in New England" has since been recorded by:

- Jim Nabors for his 1977 album Sincerely.
- Marti Caine for her 1978 album Behind the Smile.
- Roger Whittaker for his 1978 album Roger Whittaker Sings the Hits.
- Vera Lynn for her 1979 album Thank You For the Music (I Sing the Songs).
- Des O'Connor for his 1980 album Remember Romance.
- Gary Puckett for his 1982 album Melodie.
- Bill Tarmey for his 1993 A Gift of Love.
- Linzi Hateley for her 1994 album Sooner or Later.
- Martin Nievera for his 1999 album Return to Forever.
- Regine Velasquez for her 2007 album Regine Live: Songbird Sings the Classics.
- John Barrowman for his 2007 album Another Side.
- Michael Ballfor his 2011 album Heroes.
- Marin Mazzie for her 2015 album Make Your Own Kind of Music - Live at 54 Below.
- Kyle Vincent for his 2016 album Kyle Vincent Sings the Great Manilow Songbook.
- Kathryn Bernardo for her 2017 album Lovelife with Kath.

== Popular culture ==
- Two answer songs, both recorded by country musicians, were inspired by the story: "Whoever's in New England" (made a hit by Reba McEntire in 1986), which supposed that the man was having an affair and was sung from the perspective of the man's wife; and "Stay" (a hit for Sugarland in 2007), from the point of view of the mistress.
