= Debra Byrd =

American vocalist (1951–2024)

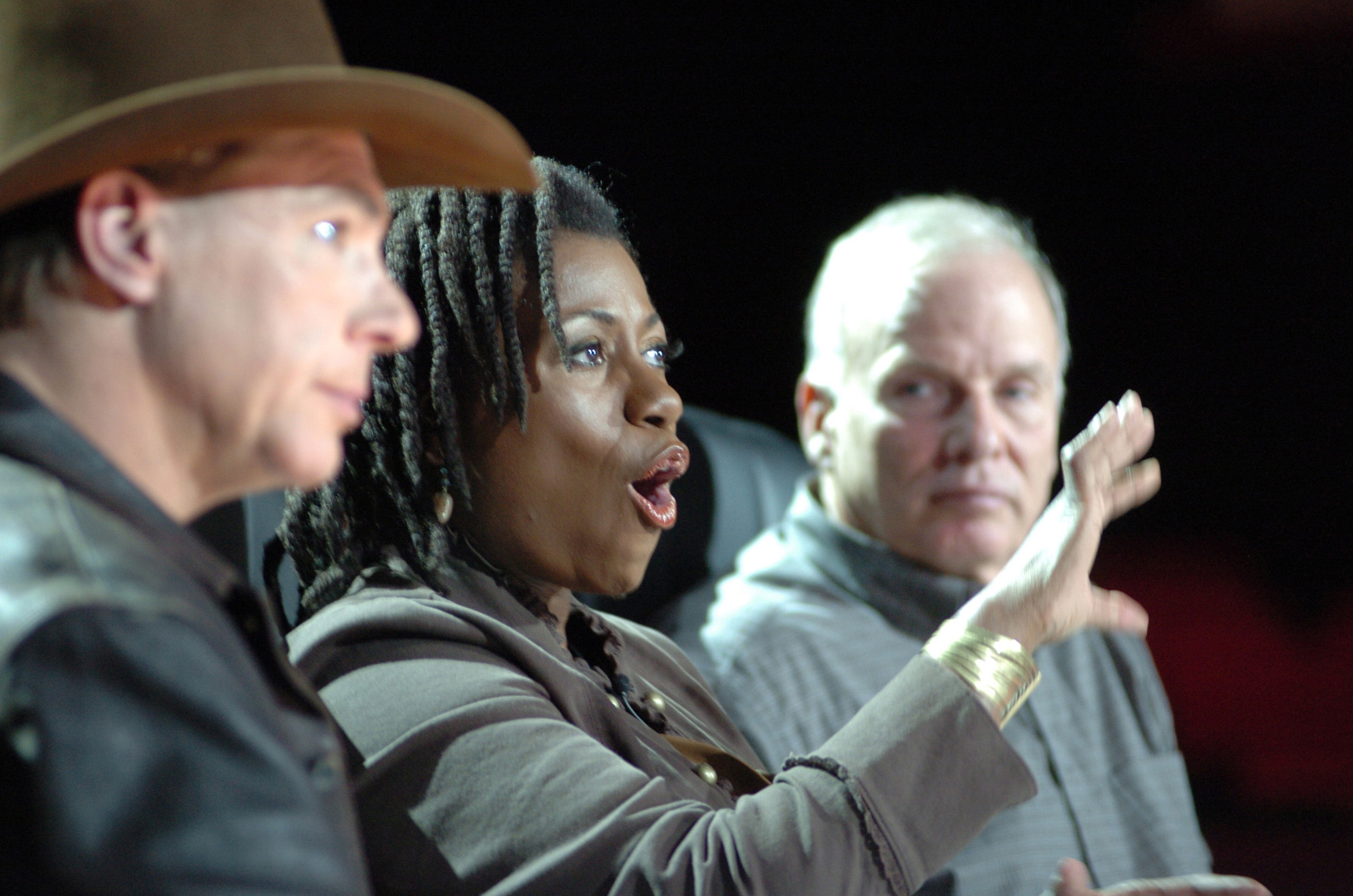
- Byrd on Military Idol

Background information
- Born: July 19, 1951
- Origin: Cleveland, Ohio, U.S.
- Died: March 5, 2024 (aged 72) Los Angeles, California, U.S.
- Genres: Soul; adult contemporary
- Occupations: Singer; actress
- Instrument: Voice

Debra Byrd (July 19, 1951 – March 5, 2024) was an American vocalist who worked with Bob Dylan, with Barry Manilow as part of his backup group from 1974 to 1979, and appeared on Broadway. She later served as the head vocal coach for American Idol and Canadian Idol, also singing backup for the contestants. Byrd helped with vocals on the Hub Television Series "Majors and Minors".

In her later years, she served as vocal coach for ten seasons of American Idol, as well as the short-lived American Juniors, and all six seasons of Canadian Idol. In late 2006 she helped judge Military Idol, a singing competition where all contestants are members of the U.S. Army.

Byrd died on March 5, 2024, at the age of 72.
