= Barry Manilow =

American singer (born 1943)

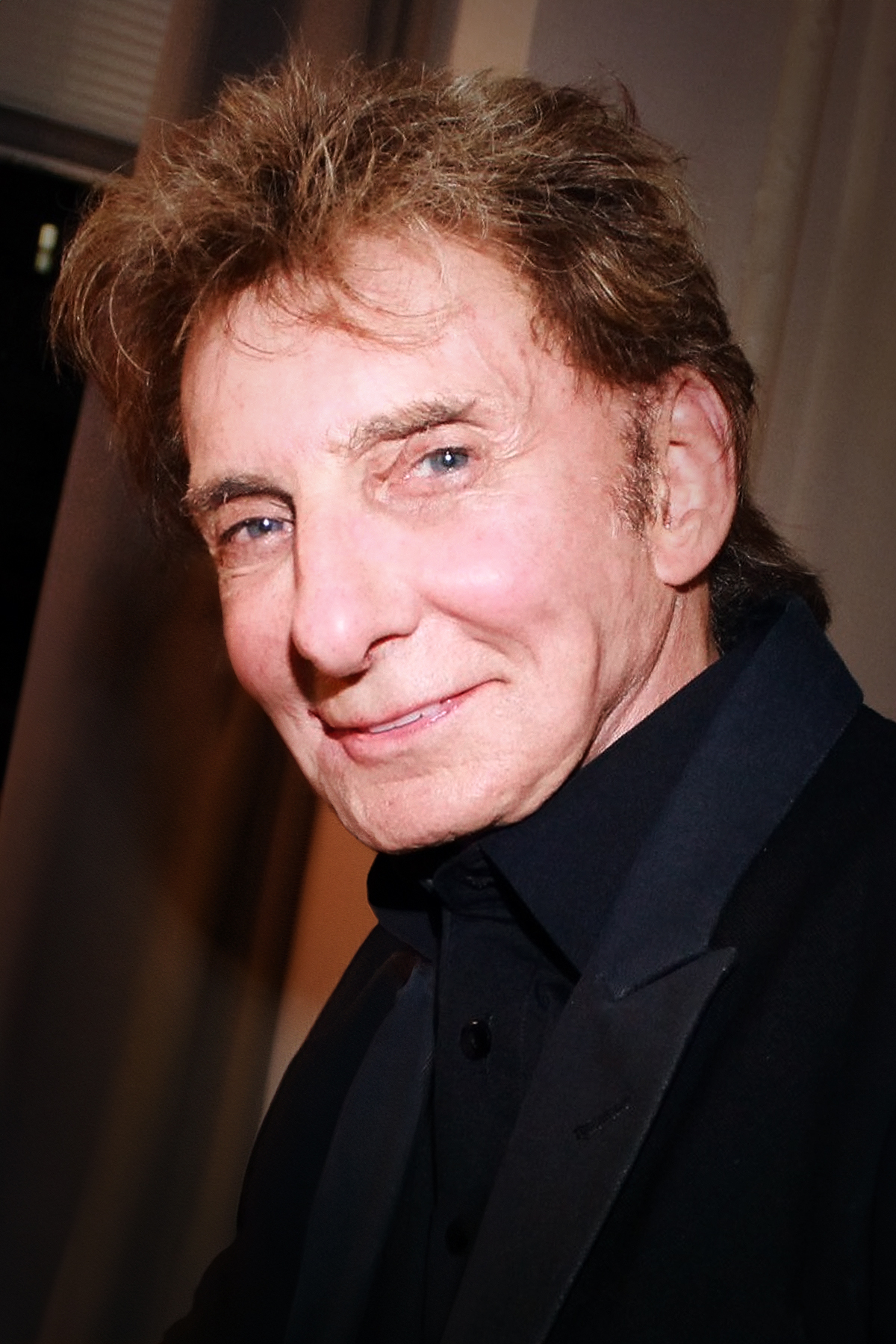
- Manilow in 2019

Background information
- Born: Barry Alan Pincus; June 17, 1943 (age 83); New York City, U.S.
- Genres: Pop; adult contemporary; pop rock; soft rock
- Occupations: Singer; songwriter; record producer
- Instruments: Vocals; piano
- Years active: 1964–present
- Labels: Bell; Arista; RCA; Concord; Verve
- Spouses: Susan Deixler (m. 1964; ann. 1966); Garry Kief (m. 2014)
- Website: barrymanilow.com

Barry Manilow (/ˈmænɪloʊ/ MAN-il-oh; born Barry Alan Pincus; June 17, 1943) is an American singer, songwriter and record producer with a career spanning over 60 years. His hit recordings include "Mandy", "Could It Be Magic", "I Write the Songs", "Weekend in New England", "Looks Like We Made It", "Can't Smile Without You", "Copacabana (At the Copa)", and "Ready to Take a Chance Again".

Manilow has recorded and released 51 Top 40 singles on the Adult Contemporary Chart, including 13 that hit number one, 28 that appeared within the top 10, and 36 that reached the top 20. He has released 13 platinum and six multi-platinum albums. Although not a favorite artist of music critics, Manilow has been praised by his peers in the recording industry. In the 1970s, Frank Sinatra predicted: "He's next."

As well as producing and arranging albums for himself and other artists, Manilow has written and performed songs for musicals, films, and commercials for corporations such as McDonald's, Pepsi Cola, and Band-Aid. He has been nominated for a Grammy Award (winning once) as a producer, arranger and performer 15 times (and in every decade) from 1973 to 2015. He has also produced Grammy-nominated albums for Bette Midler, Dionne Warwick, Nancy Wilson, and Sarah Vaughan. Manilow has sold more than 85 million records as a solo artist worldwide, making him one of the world's bestselling artists.

== Early life ==
Barry Manilow was born Barry Alan Pincus on June 17, 1943, in the Brooklyn borough of New York City. He is the son of Harold Kelliher, a truck driver of Irish descent, and Edna Manilow. Barry's mother made his father change his name to Pincus, the name of a Jewish uncle of his father from the 1800s. Barry's parents divorced when he was a baby, and his mother's family allowed no further contact between Barry and his father. Barry's maternal grandparents were Russian Jewish immigrants, and his paternal grandfather was Jewish, while his grandmother was a Catholic of Irish descent. His Irish roots trace back to Limerick, Ireland. Barry's grandfather had his surname changed to Manilow a few weeks before Barry's bar mitzvah.

Manilow grew up in the Williamsburg neighborhood of Brooklyn and graduated in 1961 from the now-defunct Eastern District High School. In high school, he met Susan Deixler, and they later married for a short time. He enrolled in the City College of New York, where he briefly studied before entering the New York College of Music. He also worked at CBS to pay his expenses while he was a student. Afterward he studied musical theater at Juilliard Performing Arts School.

== Career ==
=== 1960s ===
In 1964, Manilow met Bro Herrod, a CBS director, who asked him to arrange some songs for a musical adaptation of the melodrama, The Drunkard. Instead, Manilow wrote an entire original score. Herrod used Manilow's composition in the Off Broadway musical, which had an eight-year run at New York's 13th Street Repertory Theatre.

During this time, Manilow began work as a commercial jingle writer and singer, which continued through the remainder of the 1960s. He performed many of the TV jingles he composed, including State Farm Insurance ("Like a good neighbor, State Farm is there") or Band-Aid ("I am stuck on Band-Aid, 'cause Band-Aid's stuck on me!"), for which he adopted a childlike voice and wrote the music (Donald B. Wood wrote the lyrics). His singing-only credits include commercials for Kentucky Fried Chicken, Pepsi ("all across the nation, it's the Pepsi Generation"), McDonald's ("you deserve a break today"), and Dr Pepper. Manilow was awarded an Honorary Clio at the 50th Anniversary Clio Awards in Las Vegas in 2009 for his 1960s work as a jingle writer and singer. When accepting the award, he said he learned the most about making pop music by working for three or four years as a writer in the jingle industry.

By 1967, Manilow was the musical director for the WCBS-TV series Callback, which premiered on January 27, 1968. He next conducted and arranged for Ed Sullivan's production company, arranging a new theme for The Late Show, while writing, producing, and singing his radio and television jingles. At the same time, he and Jeanne Lucas performed as a duo for a two-season run at Julius Monk's Upstairs at the Downstairs club in New York.

By 1969, Manilow was signed by Columbia/CBS Music vice-president and recording artist Tony Orlando, who went on to co-write with and produce Manilow and a group of studio musicians under the name "Featherbed" on Columbia Pictures's newly acquired Bell Records label.

=== 1970s ===
Manilow recorded and accompanied artists on the piano for auditions and performances in the first two years of the 1970s. He recorded four tracks as Featherbed, produced by Tony Orlando on Bell Records. Three of the tracks were "Morning", a ballad; "Amy", a psychedelic-influenced pop song; and an early, uptempo version of his own co-composition (with Orlando) "Could It Be Magic". The fourth tune recorded was "Rosalie Rosie," which was to be the flip side of "Could It Be Magic", but Bell Records went with "Morning" as the flip for Featherbed's second release instead. Neither of two singles released impacted the charts.

Bette Midler saw Manilow's act in 1971 and chose him as her pianist at the Continental Baths in New York City that year, and subsequently as a producer on both her debut and second record albums, The Divine Miss M (1972) and Bette Midler (1973). He also acted as her musical director on the tour mounted for her first album. In 1973, Manilow was nominated for the Grammy Award for Album of the Year for his production role on The Divine Miss M at the 16th Grammy Awards. Manilow worked with Midler from 1971 to 1975.

After the Featherbed singles failed to have an impact on the music charts, in July 1973, Bell Records released the album Barry Manilow, which offered an eclectic mix of piano-driven pop and guitar-driven rock music, including a song called "I Am Your Child", which Manilow had composed with Marty Panzer.

Among other songs on the album were Jon Hendricks' vocalese jazz standard "Cloudburst", most successfully recorded by his group Lambert, Hendricks and Ross in 1959, and a slower-tempo version of "Could It Be Magic". The latter's music was based on Chopin's "Prelude in C Minor" and provided Donna Summer with one of her first hits. It was also covered by Take That in the 1990s, as an upbeat disco song.

In 1974, former CBS Records chief Clive Davis became temporary president of Bell with the goal of revitalizing Columbia Pictures's music division. With a $10 million investment by CPI, and a reorganization of the various Columbia Pictures legacy labels (Colpix, Colgems, and Bell), Davis introduced Columbia Pictures' new record division, Arista, in November 1974, with Davis himself owning 20% of the venture. Bell had its final number 1 hit in January 1975 with Manilow's breakthrough 1974 release of the single "Mandy" (Bell 45,613), followed shortly by the label's final hit, as well as its final single, "Look in My Eyes Pretty Woman" by Tony Orlando and Dawn (Bell 45,620—US No. 11), after which the more successful Bell albums were reissued on Arista. The final releases using the Bell imprint have the designation "Bell Records, Distributed by Arista Records, 1776 Broadway, New York, New York 10019" around the rim of the label.

Davis' reorganization efforts continued to bear fruit in 1974, with the release of Manilow's second album, Barry Manilow II, with "Mandy" as the lead single. Manilow had not wanted to record the song, which had originally been titled "Brandy" when recorded by its co-writer Scott English, but the song was included at Davis's insistence. The title was changed to "Mandy" during the recording session on August 20, 1974, because there had already been a song called "Brandy (You're a Fine Girl)" performed by Looking Glass and released in 1972 on Davis's Epic label.

"Mandy" was the start of a string of hit singles and albums that lasted through the early 1980s, coming from the multi-platinum and multi-hit albums Tryin' to Get the Feeling, This One's for You, Even Now, and One Voice. Following the success of Barry Manilow II, the first Bell Records album was remixed and reissued on Arista Records as Barry Manilow I. When Manilow went on his first tour, he included in his show what he called "A V.S.M.", or "A Very Strange Medley", a sampling of some of the commercial jingles that he had written, composed, and/or sung in the 1960s. The medley appeared later on his triple-platinum 1977 album Barry Manilow Live.

Beginning with Manilow's March 22, 1975, appearance on American Bandstand to promote the second album, a productive friendship with Dick Clark started. Among their projects together were numerous appearances by Manilow on Clark's productions of Dick Clark's New Year's Rockin' Eve, singing his original seasonal favorite "It's Just Another New Year's Eve", American Bandstand anniversary shows, American Music Awards performances, and the 1985 television movie Copacabana, starring Manilow and executive produced by Clark.

Despite being a songwriter in his own right, several of Manilow's commercial successes were songs written by others. In addition to "Mandy", written by Scott English and Richard Kerr, other hits he did not write or compose include "Tryin' to Get the Feeling Again" (by David Pomeranz), "Weekend in New England" (by Randy Edelman), "Ships" (by Ian Hunter), "Looks Like We Made It" (by Richard Kerr and Will Jennings), "Can't Smile Without You" and "Ready to Take a Chance Again" (by Charles Fox and Norman Gimbel). His number 1 hit "I Write the Songs" was composed by Bruce Johnston of The Beach Boys. According to album liner notes, Manilow did, however, perform co-production as well as arrangement duties on all the above tracks along with Ron Dante, most famous for his vocals on records by The Archies.

Manilow's breakthrough in Britain came with the release of Even Now, the first of many top-20 albums on that side of the Atlantic, which contained four singles that became major hits in the US. This was quickly followed by Manilow Magic – The Best Of Barry Manilow, also known as Greatest Hits. In the late 1970s and early 1980s, ABC aired four variety television specials starring Manilow, who served as an executive producer. The Barry Manilow Special with Penny Marshall as his guest premiered on March 2, 1977, to an audience of 37 million. The special was nominated for four Emmys at the 29th Primetime Emmy Awards and won in the category of Outstanding Special–Comedy, Variety or Music. The Second Barry Manilow Special in 1978, with Ray Charles as his guest, was also nominated for four Emmys at the 30th Primetime Emmy Awards.

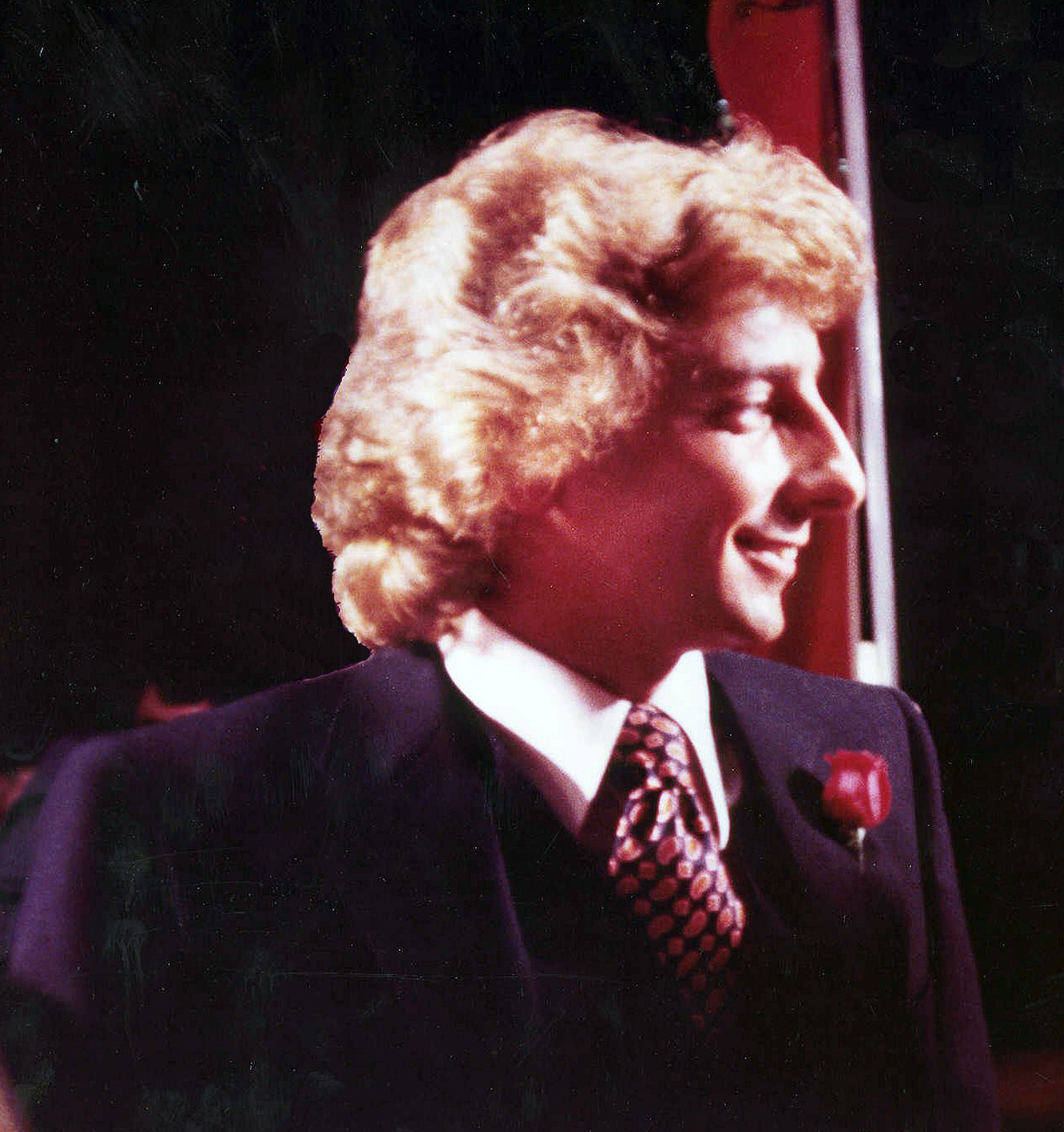
Manilow in 1979

Manilow's "Ready to Take a Chance Again" originated in the film Foul Play, which also featured "Copacabana", from his fourth studio album Even Now. "Ready to Take a Chance Again" and its songwriters Charles Fox and Norman Gimbel were nominated that year for the "Best Original Song" Oscar at the 51st Academy Awards. On February 11, 1979, a concert from Manilow's sold-out dates from his Even Now Tour at the Greek Theater in Los Angeles aired on the HBO series Standing Room Only, which was the first pay-television show to pose a serious threat to network primetime specials for ratings. From the same tour in 1978, a one-hour special from Manilow's sold-out concert at the Royal Albert Hall aired in the UK.

On May 23, 1979, ABC aired The Third Barry Manilow Special, with John Denver as his guest. This special was nominated for two Emmy awards at the 31st Primetime Emmy Awards and won for Outstanding Choreography. Also in 1979, Manilow produced Dionne Warwick's "comeback" album Dionne, her first to go platinum. He scored a top ten hit of his own, in the fall of 1979, with the song "Ships" (written and composed by Ian Hunter, former lead singer of Mott the Hoople) from the album One Voice.

=== 1980s ===
During the 1980s, Manilow topped the Adult Contemporary radio charts with songs such as "The Old Songs", "Somewhere Down the Road", "Read 'Em and Weep" (by Jim Steinman), and a remake of the 1941 Jule Styne and Frank Loesser standard "I Don't Want to Walk Without You". Manilow's songs continued to receive frequent radio airplay throughout the decade. In the UK, Manilow performed five sold-out concerts at the Royal Albert Hall. In the United States, at Radio City Music Hall, his 1984 ten-night run set a box-office sales record of nearly $2 million, making him the top draw in the 52-year history of the venue. In 1980, Manilow's One Voice special, with Dionne Warwick as his guest, was nominated for an Emmy for Outstanding Music Direction at the 32nd Primetime Emmy Awards.

Also in 1980, a concert from Manilow's shows at London England's Wembley Arena was broadcast while he was on a world tour. Manilow released the self-titled Barry (1980), which was his first album to not reach the top ten in the United States, stopping at number 15. The album contained the top 10 hits "I Made It Through the Rain" (originally a minor hit for its writer, Gerard Kenny) and "Bermuda Triangle". The album If I Should Love Again followed in 1981, with two top 40 recordings that both hit number 1 on the AC chart—"The Old Songs" and "Somewhere Down The Road"—and a third single that became a hit in the UK, a cover of the 1965 The Four Seasons smash "Let's Hang On!". This was the first of his albums that Manilow produced without Ron Dante. Manilow's sold-out concert at the Pittsburgh Civic Arena aired nationally on Showtime and locally on Philadelphia's now-defunct PRISM. In 1982, a concert from his show at the Royal Albert Hall was broadcast in England. The live album and video Barry Live in Britain also came from his Royal Albert Hall shows.

On August 27, 1983, Manilow performed a landmark open-air concert at Blenheim Palace in Britain, an event that he told the audience was "one of the most exciting nights" in his life. It was the first such event ever held at that venue and was attended by an estimated 40,000 people. This concert was also taped for airing on Showtime. In December 1983, Manilow was reported to have endowed the music departments at six major universities in the United States and Canada. The endowments were part of a continuing endeavor by Manilow to recognize and encourage new musical talent.

In 1984, Manilow released 2:00 AM Paradise Cafe, a jazz/blues collection of original barroom tunes recorded in one live take in the studio. That same year, Showtime aired a documentary of Manilow recording the album with a number of jazz legends including Sarah Vaughan and Mel Tormé. In 1984 and 1985, England aired two one-hour concert specials from his National Exhibition Centre (NEC) concerts. Barry also produced more songs for Dionne Warwick 6 songs on her Finder Of Lost Love album and 1 on her Friends album both albums released in 1985. In 1985, Manilow left Arista Records for RCA Records, where he released the pop album Manilow, and began a phase of international music, as he performed songs and duets in French, Spanish, Portuguese, and Japanese. The Manilow album was a complete about-face from the Paradise Cafe album, containing a number of uptempo tracks that featured synthesizers. In 1985, Japan aired a Manilow concert special where he played "Sakura" on the koto.

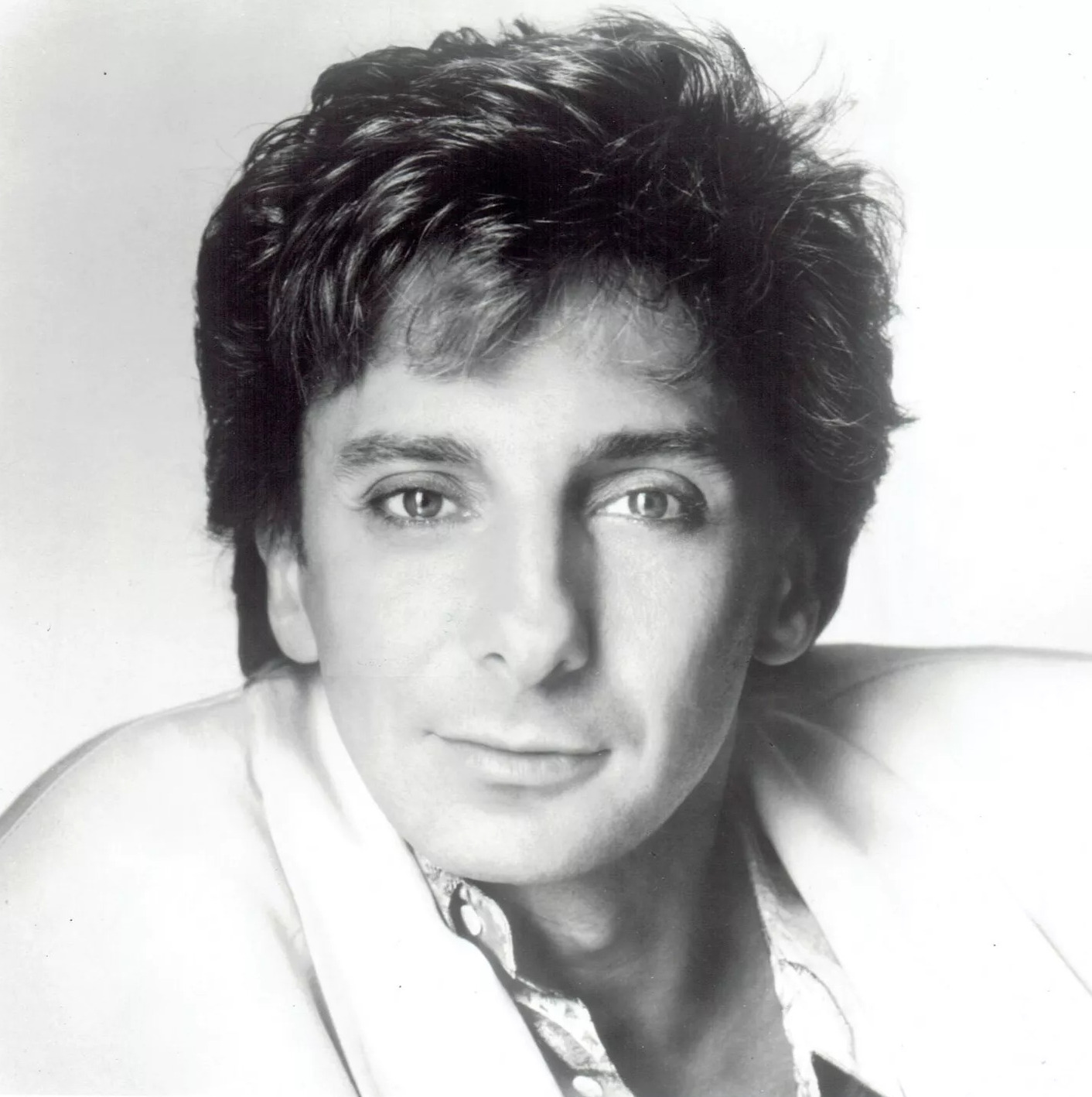
Manilow in a 1985 publicity photo

In his only lead acting role, Manilow portrayed Tony Starr in the 1985 CBS film Copacabana, based on his 1978 song "Copacabana", alongside Annette O'Toole as Lola Lamarr and Joseph Bologna as Rico Castelli. Manilow wrote all the songs for the movie, with lyrics provided by his longtime collaborators Bruce Sussman and Jack Feldman. A soundtrack album for the TV film, Copacabana: The Original Motion Picture Soundtrack Album, was released on RCA Records.

In October 1986, Manilow, along with Sussman, Tom Scott, and Charlie Fox, went to Washington, D.C. for two days of meetings with legislators, including lunch with then Senator Al Gore. They were lobbying against a copyright bill put forward by local television broadcasters that would mandate songwriter-producer source licensing of theme and incidental music on syndicated television show reruns and would disallow the use of the blanket license then in effect. The songwriters said without the blanket license, artists would have to negotiate up front with producers individually, without knowing if a series would be a success. The license now pays according to a per-use formula. Manilow said that such a bill would act as a precedent for broadcasters to get rid of the blanket license entirely.

The following year, McGraw-Hill published Manilow's autobiography, Sweet Life: Adventures on the Way to Paradise, which took three years to complete. While promoting the work, Manilow defended his music in a telephone interview: "I live in laid-back L.A., but in my heart, I'm an energetic New Yorker and that's what has always come out of my music. I've always been surprised when the critics said I made wimpy little ballads." Manilow returned to Arista Records in 1987 with the release of Swing Street. The album, a mixture of traditional after-dark and techno jazz, contained "Brooklyn Blues", an autobiographical song for Manilow, and "Hey Mambo", an uptempo Latin style duet with Kid Creole, produced with the help of Emilio Estefan, Jr., founder of Miami Sound Machine.

CBS aired Manilow's Big Fun on Swing Street special in March 1988. It featured songs and special guests from his Swing Street and 2:00 am Paradise Cafe albums, including Kid Creole and the Coconuts, Phyllis Hyman, Stanley Clarke, Carmen McRae, Tom Scott, and Uncle Festive, a band within Manilow's band at the time. The special was nominated for two Emmys in technical categories, and won in the category of Outstanding Art Direction for a Variety or Music Program at the 40th Primetime Emmy Awards.

In 1988, Manilow performed "Please Don't Be Scared" and "Mandy/Could It Be Magic" at That's What Friends Are For: AIDS Concert '88, a benefit concert for the Warwick Foundation headed by Dionne Warwick and shown on Showtime a few years later. In the 1988 Walt Disney Pictures animated feature Oliver & Company, Bette Midler's character sang a new Manilow composition, "Perfect Isn't Easy". The 1989 release of Barry Manilow, which contained "Please Don't Be Scared", "Keep Each Other Warm", and "The One That Got Away", ended Manilow's streak of albums of original self-written material (he wrote or arranged only two of the album's songs) and began a phase of his recording career consisting of covers and compilations.

From April 18 to June 10, 1989, Manilow put on a show called Barry Manilow at the Gershwin, making 44 appearances at the Gershwin Theatre (also known as the Uris Theatre), where he had also recorded Barry Manilow Live in 1976. A bestselling 90-minute video of the same show was released the following year as Barry Manilow Live on Broadway. The Showtime one-hour special Barry Manilow SRO on Broadway consisted of edited highlights from this video. Manilow followed this set of shows with a world tour of the Broadway show.

=== 1990s ===
Manilow released a number of cover tunes during the 1990s, starting with tracks on the 1989 release Barry Manilow, and continuing with his 1990 Christmas LP Because It's Christmas. On the Christmas album, Manilow was joined by pop girl trio Exposé and together they recreated, note for note, a 1943 million-selling recording of "Jingle Bells" by Bing Crosby and The Andrews Sisters. Manilow has credited Patty, Maxene, and LaVerne Andrews as inspiring him, perhaps most evident in his recording of "Jump, Shout Boogie". More "event" albums followed, including Showstoppers, a collection of Broadway songs (1991), Singin' with the Big Bands (1994), and a late 1970s collection Summer of '78 (1996), which included the hit "I Go Crazy", a hit for Paul Davis in 1978. The decade ended with Manilow recording a tribute to Frank Sinatra, Manilow Sings Sinatra (1998), released months after Sinatra's death.

In 1990, Japan aired National Eolia Special: Barry Manilow On Broadway where he sang the title song "Eolia", which was used as a song there in a commercial for an air conditioner company of the same name, as well as other songs from his 1989–1990 Live on Broadway tour. In the early 1990s, Manilow signed on with Don Bluth to compose the songs with lyricists Jack Feldman and Bruce Sussman for three animated films. He co-wrote the Broadway-style musical scores for Thumbelina (1994) and The Pebble and the Penguin (1995). The third film, Rapunzel, was shelved after the poor performance of The Pebble and the Penguin. Manilow was to be cast as the voice of a cricket. He also composed the score and wrote two songs with Sussman for Disney Sing Along Songs: Let's Go To The Circus.

Manilow produced the 1991 album With My Lover Beside Me by legendary jazz vocalist Nancy Wilson. The record is based on lyrics left behind by famed composer Johnny Mercer that had never been set to music. Manilow was invited in 1993 by Mercer's widow to complete the songs. His own recording of "When October Goes", with lyrics by Mercer, was released as a single in 1984, from his album 2:00 AM Paradise Cafe. Further Mercer compositions were set to music by Manilow over the following years, culminating in the 1991 Nancy Wilson release. Manilow is featured in a duet on the record in the final cut "Epilogue".

On February 19, 1992, Manilow testified before the Subcommittee on Intellectual Property and Judicial Administration House Committee in support of H.R. 3204, The Audio Home Recording Act of 1991. The bill was signed into law on October 28, 1992, by President George H. W. Bush and became effective immediately. In 1993, PBS aired Barry Manilow: The Best of Me, which was taped at Wembley Arena in England earlier that year. The BBC also played a one-hour version of the same show including "The Best of Me", sung during the concert, as a bonus song or "lucky strike extra" as Manilow says, not seen in The Complete Collection and Then Some..., the video release of the show, but the song was included on the DVD of the same title, with Manilow seated in front of a black curtain, lip-syncing to the recording. He performed 14 concerts as part of an extended tour of Germany, Austria, and Denmark. Manilow branched out in another direction and, with Sussman, launched Copacabana, a musical play based on previous Manilow-related adaptations. They wrote new songs and it ran for two years in London's West End, and a tour company formed.

In December 1996, A&E aired Barry Manilow: Live By Request, the first of his two Live By Request appearances. The broadcast was A&E's most successful music program, attracting an estimated 2.4 million viewers. The show was also simulcast on the radio. In March 1997, VH-1 aired Barry Manilow: The Summer of '78, a one-hour special of Manilow solo at the piano being interviewed and playing his greatest hits as well as songs from Summer of '78, his latest release at the time.

In another collaboration, Manilow and Sussman co-wrote Harmony: A New Musical, based on the story of the Comedian Harmonists, a male singing group popular in Germany from 1928 to 1934. The musical previewed from October 7 to November 23, 1997, at the La Jolla Playhouse. In 2003, Harmony was originally scheduled for a tryout run in Philadelphia before going to Broadway, but was canceled after financial difficulties. In a legal battle with Mark Schwartz, the show's producer, Manilow and Sussman in 2005 won back the rights to the musical. The work was staged in Atlanta in 2013 and Los Angeles in 2014, had its New York debut in 2022 at the National Yiddish Theatre Folksbiene and came to Broadway in late 2023 for a three-month run at the Ethel Barrymore Theatre.

In 1998, Manilow released the record album Manilow Sings Sinatra which earned him a Grammy nomination for Best Traditional Pop Vocal Album at the 42nd Annual Grammy Awards in 1999.

On October 23, 1999, NBC aired the two-hour special StarSkates Salute to Barry Manilow, taped at the Mandalay Bay Hotel in Las Vegas, featuring numerous figure skaters performing to Manilow's music. Manilow also performed.

=== 2000s ===
In 2000, Manilow had two specials, Manilow Country and Manilow Live!, taped over two consecutive days at the Tennessee Performing Arts Center in Nashville, Tennessee. On April 11, 2000, The Nashville Network (TNN) aired the two-hour Manilow Country, which featured country stars Trisha Yearwood, Neal McCoy, Deana Carter, Jo Dee Messina, Lorrie Morgan, Kevin Sharp, Lila McCann, Gillian Welch, and Jaci Velasquez singing their favorite Manilow hits with a "country" twist; Manilow also performed. This special was TNN's first High Definition (HD) broadcast and became one of TNN's highest rated concert specials.

In June 2000, DirecTV aired the two-hour concert special Manilow Live! where Manilow had his band, a 30-piece orchestra, and a choir. This HDTV special documented the concert tour at the time with the greatest hits of his career and was also released to video. Also that year, he worked with Monica Mancini on her Concord album The Dreams of Johnny Mercer, which included seven songs of Mercer's lyrics set to Manilow's music. Meanwhile, Manilow's record contract with Arista Records was not renewed due to new management. He then got a contract at Concord Records, a jazz-oriented label in California, and started work on the concept album Here at the Mayflower. The album was another eclectic mix of styles, almost entirely composed and produced by Manilow himself.

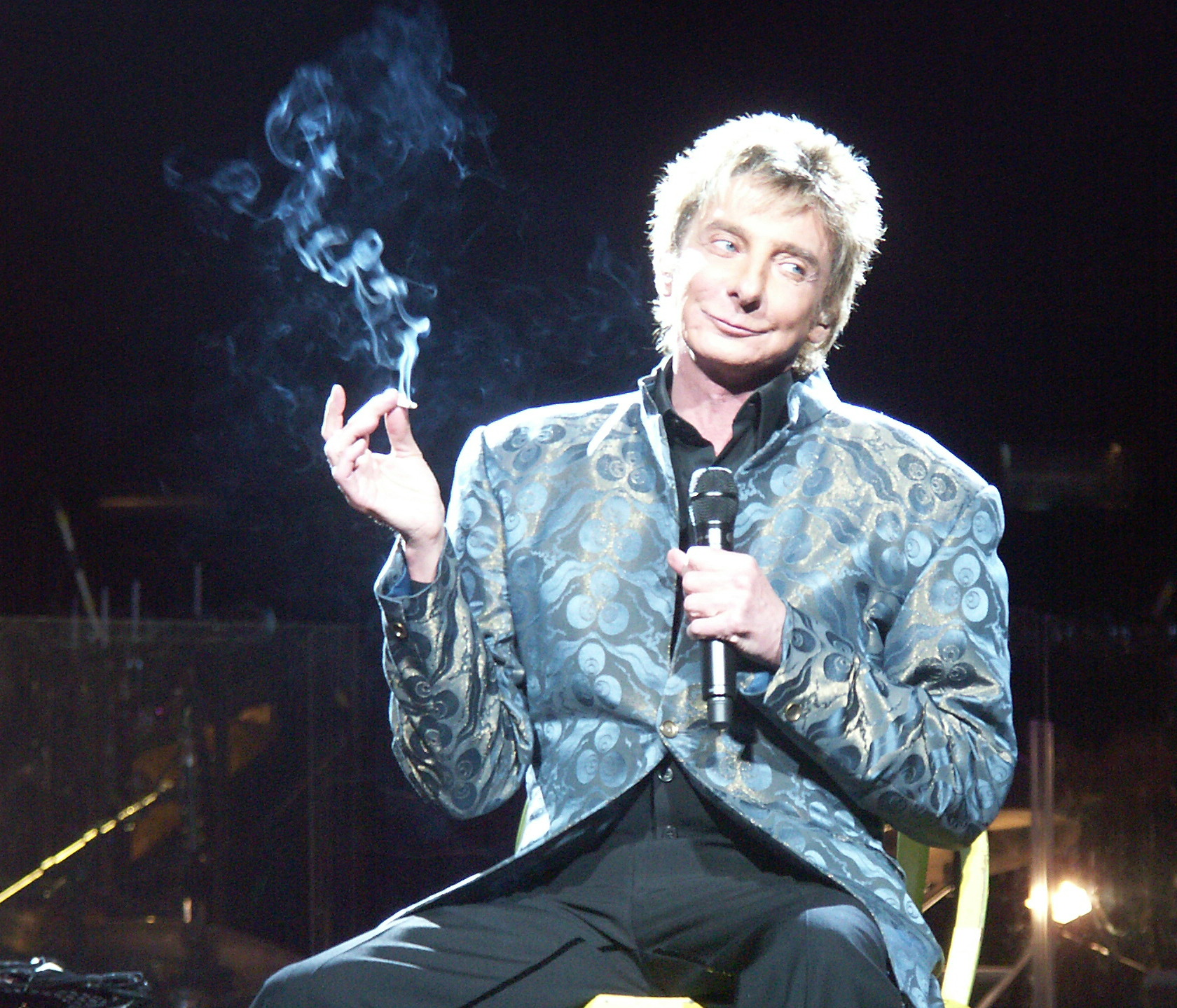
Manilow live in 2008 during a 1960s sketch

While Manilow was at Concord Records, the Barry Manilow Scholarship was awarded for four consecutive years (2002–2005) to the six highest-achieving students to reward excellence in the art and craft of lyric writing. The UCLA Extension course "Writing Lyrics That Succeed and Endure" was taught by long-time Manilow collaborator Marty Panzer, and each student received three additional "master class" advanced sessions as well as a three-hour private, one-on-one session with Panzer. Scholarship recipients were selected by the instructor based on progress made within the course, lyric writing ability, and the instructor's assessment of real potential in the field of songwriting. In February 2002, Manilow returned to the charts when Arista released a greatest hits album, Ultimate Manilow. On May 18, 2002, he returned to CBS with Ultimate Manilow, his first special on the network since his Big Fun on Swing Street special in 1988. The special was filmed in the Kodak Theatre in Hollywood, California, and was nominated for an Emmy in the category of Outstanding Music Direction at the 54th Primetime Emmy Awards.

Produced by Manilow, Bette Midler Sings the Rosemary Clooney Songbook was released on September 30, 2003. It was the first time the pair had worked together in more than twenty years. The album went gold, and they collaborated again in 2005 on Bette Midler Sings the Peggy Lee Songbook. On December 3, 2003, A&E aired A Barry Manilow Christmas: Live by Request, his second of two concerts for the series. The two-hour special had Manilow taking requests for Christmas songs performed live with a band and an orchestra. Manilow told the audience that he was what Clay Aiken was going to look like in thirty years, acknowledging an ongoing comparison of the two. Also on the special were guests Cyndi Lauper, José Feliciano, and Midler (who, busy preparing her own tour in Los Angeles, appeared only in a pre-taped segment).

In 2004, Manilow released two albums: a live album, 2 Nights Live! (BMG Strategic Marketing Group, 2004); and Scores: Songs from Copacabana & Harmony, an album of Manilow singing songs from his musicals. Scores was the last of Manilow's creative projects with the Concord label.

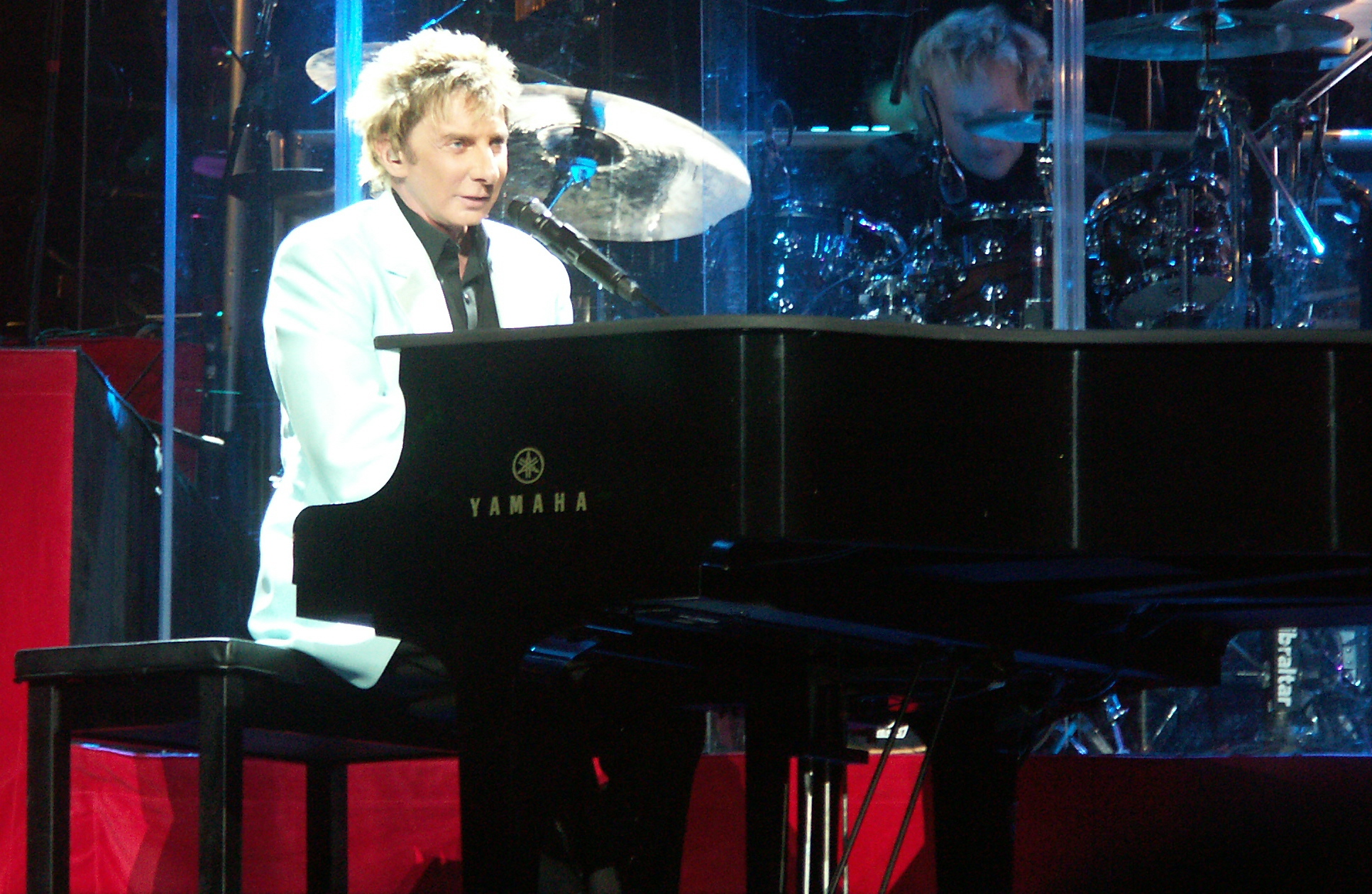
Manilow live at the piano (2008)

During his third appearance on The Oprah Winfrey Show on September 15, 2004, Winfrey announced that Manilow is one of the most requested guests of all time on her show. On the show, he promoted his One Night Live! One Last Time! tour. It was around this period that Manilow appeared for the first time on the mainstream FOX program American Idol in which his back-up singer, Debra Byrd, doubles as voice coach on the series. Manilow also appeared on Clay Aiken's TV special A Clay Aiken Christmas.

Las Vegas Hilton executives in a press conference with Manilow on December 14, 2004, announced his signing to a long-term engagement as the house show. He began the residency in February 2005 with a show entitled Manilow: Music and Passion. In March 2006, Manilow's engagement was extended through 2008.

Manilow returned to Arista Records under Davis for a new covers album, released on January 31, 2006, The Greatest Songs of the Fifties. Manilow said he was blown away by the idea, which Davis presented when he visited Manilow's Las Vegas show. "When he suggested this idea to me, I slapped my forehead and said, 'Why hasn't anyone thought of this idea?'" Manilow said. It was an unexpected success, debuting at number one in the Billboard 200, marking the first time a Manilow album debuted at the top of the album chart as well as the first time a Manilow album had reached number one in 29 years. It was eventually certified Platinum in the U.S., and sold more than 3 million copies worldwide.

In March 2006, PBS aired Barry Manilow: Music and Passion, a Hilton concert recorded exclusively for the network's fundraising drive. Manilow was nominated for two Emmys, winning for Outstanding Individual Performance in a Variety or Music Program at the 58th Primetime Emmy Awards. A sequel album to his bestselling fifties tribute album, The Greatest Songs of the Sixties was released on October 31, 2006, including songs such as "And I Love Her" and "Can't Help Falling in Love". It nearly repeated the success of its predecessor, debuting at number 2 in the Billboard 200.

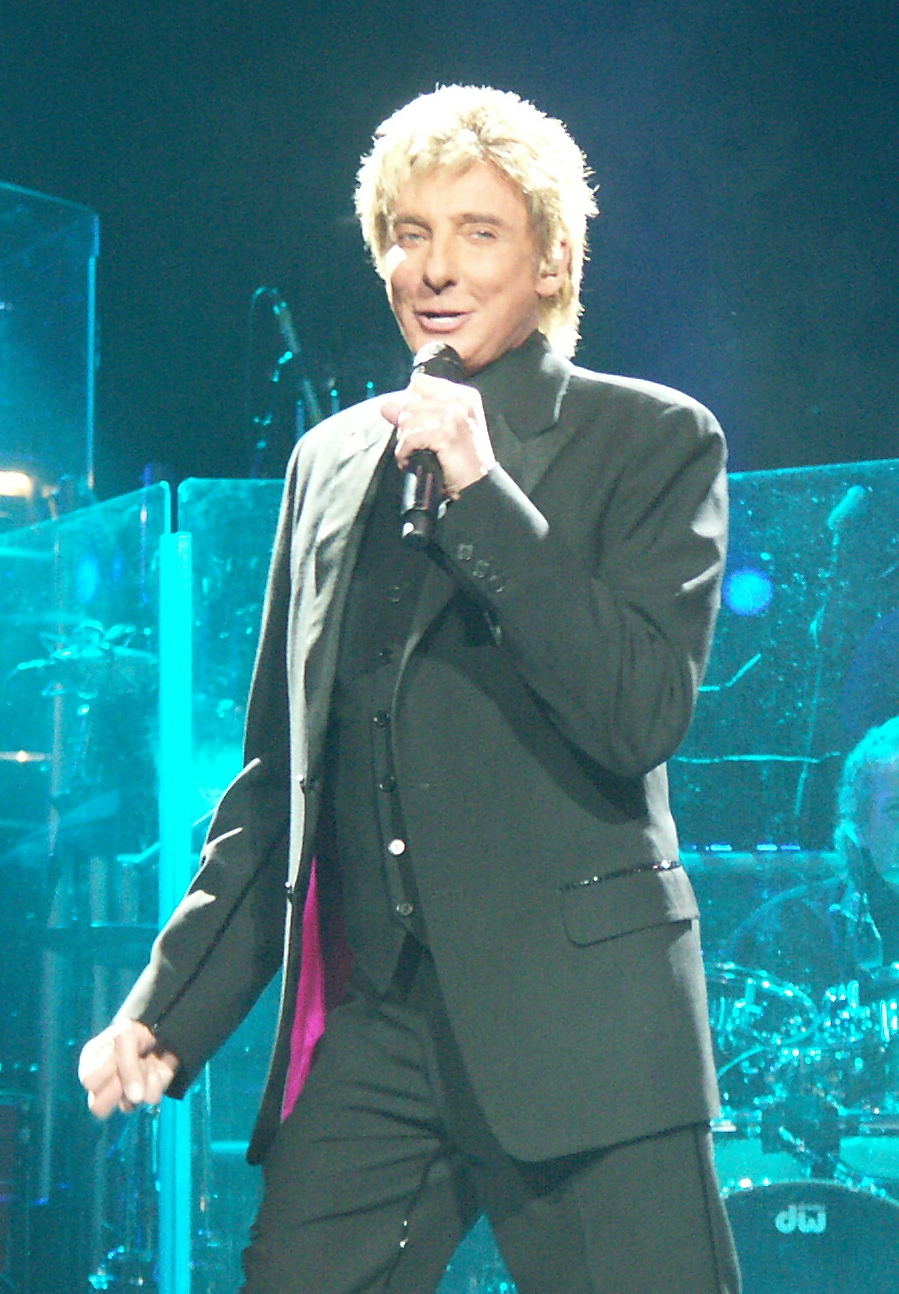
Manilow live at the Xcel Energy Center (2008)

In January 2007, Manilow returned to New York City for three shows at Madison Square Garden. These included showing onscreen Manilow performing in one of his first television appearances, while the "live" Manilow played along onstage. In August, he played several shows on the east coast of the United States. Four more took place in December, half in the New York tri-state area in Uniondale and East Rutherford, and two in Cleveland and Detroit. Manilow launched another short tour in early 2008, visiting several large venues, including the Xcel Energy Center in St. Paul, Minnesota. A further album in the decades themed series, The Greatest Songs of the Seventies, went on release September 18, 2007. Barry Manilow: Songs from the Seventies, a PBS concert special based on the work, was taped in Brooklyn in October 2007. The show aired on PBS in December 2007 and was rebroadcast over New Year 2009. He appeared on American Idol on February 3, 2009, during Hollywood Week to give advice to the contestants.

Manilow released his third Christmas album in November 2007, In the Swing of Christmas, which went Gold and earned him another Best Traditional Pop Vocal Album Grammy Award nomination at the 51st Grammy Awards in 2008.

In December 2008, Manilow narrated the animated Christmas special Cranberry Christmas, which was broadcast on ABC Family and sponsored by Ocean Spray. In addition to narrating, he also contributed two original songs that he composed with his long time collaborator, lyricist Bruce Sussman: "Christmas Is Just Around the Corner" and "Watch Out for Mr. Grape". "Christmas Is Just Around the Corner" was also released as a single, and appeared as a bonus track on the 2009 re-release of In the Swing of Christmas.

He performed in A Capitol Fourth in 2009, when he took part in both the opening and closing performances, singing patriotic songs accompanied by the National Symphony Orchestra.

In October 2009, Manilow TV, a monthly video subscription service, launched. Once a month, Barry Manilow picks a different concert from his personal archive to show to subscribers. In the first month, the first episode showed performances on April 20–21, 1996, at Wembley Arena in London.

Manilow ended his residency at the Hilton with a show entitled "Ultimate Manilow: the Hits" on December 30, 2009, after 300 performances for 450,000 fans.

=== 2010s ===
On January 26, 2010, Manilow released The Greatest Love Songs of All Time, and, in December of that year, the album was nominated for a Grammy Award in the category of Best Traditional Pop Vocal Album at the 52nd Grammy Awards.

He opened his new show "Manilow Paris Las Vegas" at the Paris Hotel & Casino at Las Vegas in March 2010.

On December 11, 2010, Manilow performed at the Nobel Peace Prize Concert in Oslo, Norway.

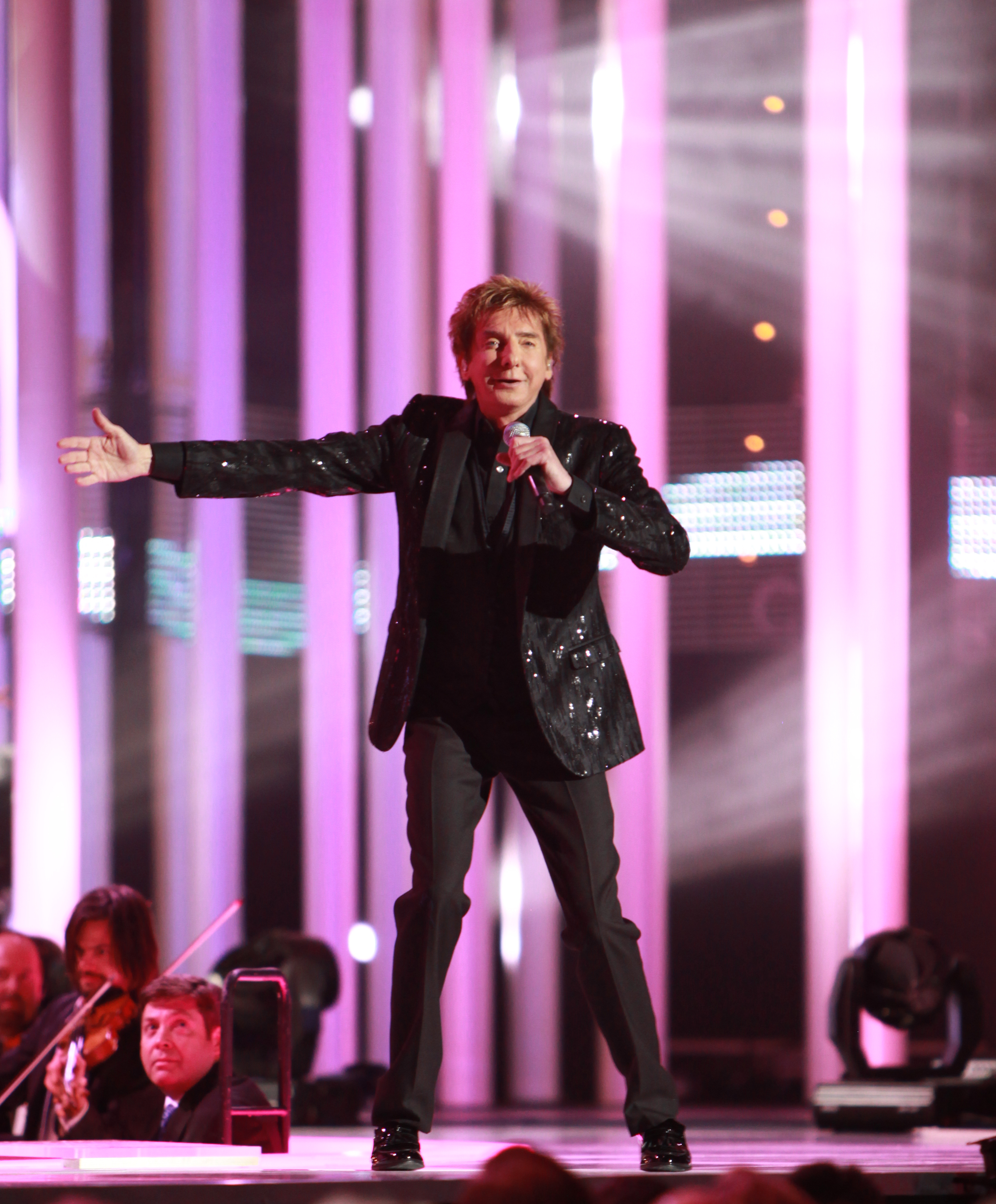
Manilow performing at the Nobel Peace Prize Concert, 2010

Manilow completed work on his new album, 15 Minutes, in March 2011, with his official Facebook page announcing that he had completed putting "finishing touches" to the album on March 16, 2011.

On March 13, 2011, Manilow appeared at the 2011 Laurence Olivier Awards at London's Theatre Royal, Drury Lane, singing "Copacabana" with the BBC Concert Orchestra and also singing with hit West End star, Kerry Ellis.

Since March 2011, he has hosted They Write the Songs, a documentary series for BBC Radio 2 in which he looks at the life and work of popular composers.

In May 2011, Manilow recorded his concerts at the O2 Arena in London, for CD and DVD release in early 2012.

In a June 2011 interview with the Los Angeles Times, Manilow said his new album was influenced by Britney Spears; the album is about the pleasures and pitfalls of fame. It was influenced directly by Spears's personal struggles in 2007. 15 Minutes debuted at number 7 on the U.S. Billboard 200 Album Chart. The first single from 15 Minutes, "Bring on Tomorrow", entered the U.S. Billboard Hot 200 Singles Chart's top 40, becoming Manilow's 47th top 40 hit.

In November 2011, Manilow recorded his shows at the Paris Las Vegas for an upcoming TV special and DVD release.

Manilow concluded his two-year residency at the Paris Hotel in Las Vegas on December 11, 2012. This also ended his seven-year stay in Las Vegas.

In January 2013, Manilow returned to Broadway with his concert series "Manilow on Broadway". It was his first appearance on Broadway in more than two decades.

On July 4, 2013, Manilow performed live on the west lawn of the U.S. Capitol as part of A Capitol Fourth. This was his second appearance on the PBS program.

On September 6, 2013, Harmony: A New Musical started a second run. This time at Atlanta's Alliance Theatre. The musical then had performances in Los Angeles in 2014.

On November 12, 2013, he performed at the BBC's Children in Need Rocks 2013.

On March 11, 2014, Manilow released Night Songs, an album of standards performed only with piano and synthesized acoustic bass by Manilow himself. It earned him a Best Traditional Pop Vocal Album Grammy nomination that year at the 57th Grammy Awards.

On October 28, 2014, Manilow released My Dream Duets, which won him his fourth Best Traditional Pop Vocal Album Grammy Award nomination at the 58th Annual Grammy Awards. This was the fifteenth Grammy Award nomination of his career, with nominations occurring in every decade since the 1970s.

On February 11, 2015, Manilow began his One Last Time! tour at the CenturyLink Center Omaha in Omaha, Nebraska with stops at most major North American venues. Other destinations included Chicago at the United Center, Los Angeles at the Staples Center, and Brooklyn at the Barclays Center for the tour finale on June 17, where Manilow celebrated his 72nd birthday.

In 2017, Billboard declared that Manilow has been on a Billboard 200 hot streak since 2002, when his greatest-hits collection Ultimate Manilow debuted and peaked at No. 3 (February 23, 2002), becoming his highest-charting set (and first top 10) since 1979's One Voice (No. 9). Since 2002, Manilow has logged a dozen top 40 efforts (including Ultimate). Further, he has notched at least one top 40 album in each of the five decades from the 1970s through the 2010s.

In 2019, it was announced that Manilow's original musical Harmony would make its New York debut at National Yiddish Theatre Folksbiene in the Museum of Jewish Heritage, running from February 11 until March 29, 2020. The run was canceled due to the start of the COVID-19 pandemic and rescheduled for spring 2022.

=== 2020s ===
On February 14, 2020, Manilow released Night Songs II, which debuted at No. 32 on the Billboard 200, marking his sixth consecutive decade of top 40-charting albums beginning with Barry Manilow II in 1975.

In April 2020, Manilow scored his 36th top-20 Billboard Adult Contemporary chart hit with "When the Good Times Come Again", which peaked at number 12 the week of July 2. The song was originally recorded for his self-titled 1989 album and never released as a single. A fan made a lyric video for the song when the COVID-19 pandemic hit. Manilow found the video and posted it on his Facebook page, leading his management company to send the song to radio stations for airplay.

In August 2020, Manilow sold his song catalog to Hipgnosis Songs Fund.

In 2021, Manilow started his The Hits Come Home residency at the Westgate Hotel in Las Vegas.

On December 11, 2023, NBC aired the Christmas special Barry Manilow's A Very Barry Christmas, featuring Manilow.

A fourteen-night residency at the London Palladium in May and June 2024 has been billed as the "last, last UK concerts".

On September 23, 2025, Manilow released the Peter Allen/Dean Pitchford-penned song "Once Before I Go," a single from his forthcoming album What a Time.

== Personal life ==
Manilow married his high-school sweetheart, Susan Deixler, in 1964. He later said he was in love with her but his passion for a music career and lack of maturity strained their relationship. He left the woman he considered "the perfect wife" after one year of marriage in pursuit of a "wondrous musical adventure". Manilow credits the response he received from Playboy in December 1965 for the courage to leave everything behind and begin a career in music:

I asked a lot of people what I should do, and they all said different things. Finally, I was so desperate, I wrote to the Playboy Advisor.

Deixler had the marriage annulled in 1966. After coming out as gay in 2017, Manilow said that he had been in love with Deixler and the marriage's failure was not related to sexual orientation.

In 1978, Manilow began a relationship with TV executive Garry Kief, who soon became his manager. They married in 2014, after same-sex marriage became legal in California. They kept the relationship and his sexual orientation private until the marriage made headlines in 2015. The media reported it after a friend of Manilow's, Suzanne Somers, disclosed that the two men had privately exchanged vows at Manilow's home in Palm Springs, California. No official paperwork was filed, but it was reported that the couple exchanged wedding bands as a sign of their dedication. Manilow officially came out as gay in April 2017, telling People that he was pleasantly surprised to find that his mostly female fan base was supportive of the marriage; he had feared the news would disappoint them.

Manilow has a stepdaughter through his husband's previous marriage and an adopted granddaughter.

=== Health ===
On December 22, 2025, Manilow, a cigarette smoker from age 9 to age 39, announced a diagnosis of early stage lung cancer, for which he would undergo surgery.

Following his successful lung cancer surgery, Manilow is facing significant vocal challenges that threaten his singing career. Despite being cancer-free and intending to proceed with a summer tour, Manilow revealed in a June 2026 interview that his voice has not recovered as expected.

== Philanthropy and fundraising ==
After Hurricane Hugo in 1989 affected the Charleston, South Carolina area Manilow held a benefit concert at the University of South Carolina's Carolina Coliseum in Columbia where the $10 tickets sold out in three hours, and asked concertgoers to bring canned food to be donated to residents in disaster areas. Before his concert, Mayor T. Patton Adams declared the day "Barry Manilow Day." Manilow presented The Red Cross and The Salvation Army with checks of $42,500 each.

On January 15, 1994, three hours before showtime, Manilow canceled a performance at an Ethnic Pride and Heritage Festival hosted at the Convention Center in Atlantic City, New Jersey. Benefactors included the Children's Hospital of New Jersey in Newark, the Community Foundation of New Jersey as well as United Hospitals Medical Center Foundation and Newark Museum in Newark during the pre-inaugural activities for then New Jersey Governor-elect Christie Whitman. Manilow said that he was specifically told in writing that the concert would be part of a nonpartisan event.

To help in the aftermath of Hurricane Katrina in 2005, every dollar his fans donated to the American Red Cross through the Manilow Fund for Health and Hope website Manilow personally matched, and the fund itself also matched, tripling the original donation. The fund delivered $150,000, raised in 48 hours, to the American Red Cross.

On October 27, 2011, Manilow visited Joplin, Missouri, a little more than five months after a tornado destroyed one-third of that city, including its only high school. His Manilow Music Project made a contribution of $300,000 to restore the musical program and instruments that were lost.

== Litigation ==
On February 8, 1994, Manilow sued Los Angeles radio station KBIG (104.3 FM), seeking $13 million in damages and $15 million in punitive damages, claiming that one of their advertisements was causing irreparable damage to his professional reputation. The ad, a thirty-second spot that began airing on January 31, suggested that people listen to KBIG because it does not play Manilow's music. The lawsuit was filed in Orange County Superior Court by Los Angeles attorney C. Tucker Cheadle. Two days later, KBIG agreed to drop the commercial, but Cheadle stopped short of agreeing to withdraw the $28 million lawsuit.

Arizona Court of Appeals Judge Philip Espinosa sued Manilow over the audio volume of a December 23, 1993, concert he attended with his wife. The judge said in the lawsuit he has had a constant ringing in his ears (tinnitus) and nearly blew his ears out. Espinosa sought unspecified damages, and the trial was set for September 23, 1997. The suit also named Manilow's production company, an Arizona concert promoter, and the city of Tucson, Arizona, which runs the convention center where the concert was held. In July 1997, to settle the suit it was reported that Manilow donated $5,000 to the American Tinnitus Association.

== In media ==
In 1979, Manilow's musical style was satirized in the song "I Need Your Help Barry Manilow" performed by Ray Stevens. The song leads off with a musical phrase resembling the opening of "I Write the Songs" and also references "Mandy", "Copacabana", "Can't Smile Without You", "Weekend in New England", "Could It Be Magic" and "Tryin' to Get the Feeling Again" in a storyline where the singer details a litany of comedically unfortunate events in his life, concluding that he needs Manilow to sing one of his more melancholy and wistful songs to comfort him, as several of Manilow's biggest hits have storylines about suffering and misfortune.

The song reached number 49 on the US Billboard Hot 100 number 11 on the Adult Contemporary chart. It spent a total of eight weeks on Hot 100 chart and also charted in Great Britain, Canada, and Australia. The single's cover art is a spoof of Manilow's album Barry Manilow II, and the song's album spoofs title and cover art of Manilow's Tryin' to Get the Feeling.

In 1989, an American tabloid claimed that Manilow was engaged to porn star Robin Byrd. On a June 22, 1989, appearance on The Tonight Show, Johnny Carson asked Manilow about the story. Manilow replied that he was just friends with Byrd, an innocent picture had been taken, and that there was no truth to the engagement. After he met Byrd, his band gave him a videotape of Debbie Does Dallas as a present for his birthday. Manilow told Carson that he could not watch his friend doing what she does in that movie.

Manilow made headlines in June 2006 when Australian officials blasted his music from 9:00 p.m. until midnight every Friday, Saturday, and Sunday to deter gangs of youths from congregating in a residential area late at night. In February 2022, New Zealand authorities employed a similar tactic against protesters who camped outside the country's parliament building to protest against COVID-19 vaccine mandates.

== Tours ==
Headlining

- II Tour (1974–75)
- Barry Manilow in Person (1975–76)
- This One's for You Tour (1976–77)
- Even Now Tour (1978)
- 1980 World Tour (1980)
- In the Round World Tour (1981–82)
- Around the World in 80 Dates (1982)
- Hot Tonight Tour (1983)
- Paradise Tour (1984–85)
- Big Fun Tour de Force (1987–89)
- Barry Manilow in Concert (1989–90)
- Showstoppers Tour (1991–92)
- Greatest Hits...and Then Some Tour (1992–95)
- World Tour '96 (1996)
- Reminiscing Tour (1997–98)
- Manilow Live! (1999–2000)
- Live 2002 (2002)
- One Night Live! One Last Time! Tour (2004)
- An Evening of Music and Passion (2006, 2008)
- The Hits...and Then Some Tour (2009)
- 2012 Tour (2012)
- Manilow in Concert: Direct from Broadway (2013)
- 2014 Tour (2014)
- One Last Time! Tour (2015–16)
- A Very Barry Christmas (2017, 2018)
- This is My Town Tour (2017–18)
- 2022 UK Tour (2022)
- Manilow: Hits 2023! (2023)

Opening act

- Freddie Hubbard in Concert (for Freddie Hubbard) (1974)
- No Way to Treat a Lady Tour (for Helen Reddy) (1975)
- An Evening with Roberta Flack (for Roberta Flack) (1975)

Residency shows

- Showcase at the Continental Baths (1973)
- On Broadway ... in Manhattan (1976–77)
- Barry at the Gershwin (1989)
- Barry Manilow on Broadway (1989)
- Music and Passion (2005–08)
- Ultimate Manilow: The Hits (2008–09)
- A Gift of Love (2009, 2012, 2015, 2017, 2021)
- Manilow (2010–11)
- Live at the St. James (2013)
- The Hits Come Home (2018–present)
- Live at the Lunt-Fontanne Theatre (2019)

== Awards ==
- 1977 Emmy for Outstanding Special – Comedy, Variety or Music – The Barry Manilow Special
- 1977 Special Tony Award – Barry Manilow on Broadway
- 1978 American Music Awards – Favorite Pop/Rock Male Artist
- 1978 Grammy – Copacabana Best Pop Male Vocal Performance
- 1979 American Music Awards – Favorite Pop/Rock Male Artist
- 1980 American Music Awards – Favorite Pop/Rock Male Artist
- 1980 Star on the Hollywood Walk of Fame
- 2002 Songwriter's Hall of Fame
- 2003 Society of Singers Lifetime Achievement Award
- 2006 Emmy for Outstanding Individual Performance in a Variety or Music Program – Barry Manilow: Music And Passion
- 2007 RIAA – Plaque commemorating worldwide record sales of 75 million
- 2009 Clio Awards – Honorary Clio Award for 1960s work as a jingle writer and singer at the 50th Anniversary CLIO Awards in Las Vegas.
- 2026 American Advertising Federation (AAF) – President's Award for Special Lifetime Contributions to Advertising at 75th Anniversary Awards Gala.

== Selected TV and movie appearances ==
- Tonight Show – November 17, 1972 (with Bette Midler)
- Tonight Show – September 12, 1973 (with Bette Midler)
- The Dick Cavett Show – September 19, 1974 (with Bette Davis)

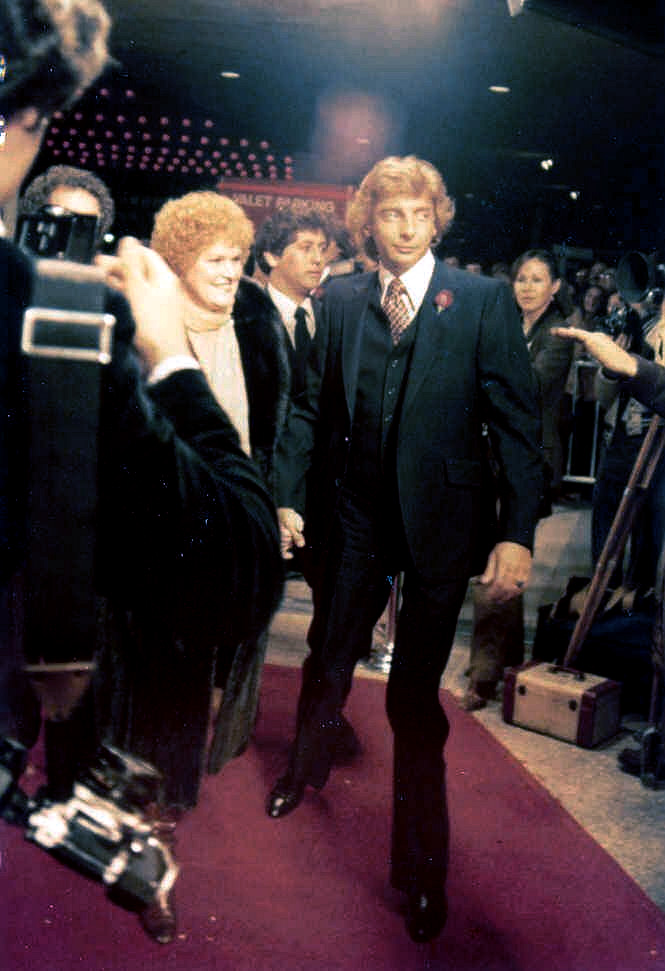
Manilow, accompanied by long-time friend Linda Allen at the premiere of The Rose (starring Bette Midler), November 7, 1979

- Donny & Marie on October 23, 1977
- ABC special The Barry Manilow Special on March 2, 1977
- ABC special The Second Barry Manilow Special on February 24, 1978
- ABC special The Stars Salute Israel at 30 on May 8, 1978
- ABC special The Third Barry Manilow Special on May 23, 1979
- ABC special Barry Manilow: One Voice on May 19, 1980
- May 8, 1982, Goldie & Kids a special with hostess Goldie Hawn where he acted in skits and sang "One Voice", "Sunday Father", and "I Am Your Child".
- Tonight Show – November 29, 1985, singing his new hit "In Search of Love"
- In 1985 Barry wrote and starred in the television movie Copacabana, a musical which was inspired by his 1978 song "Copacabana"
- On September 17, 1987, he appeared in the star-studded CBS special We The People 200: The Constitutional Gala taped at the Philadelphia Civic Center in Philadelphia, Pennsylvania to debut his song "Let Freedom Ring".
- CBS special Barry Manilow: Big Fun on Swing Street on March 7, 1988
- On May 17, 1989, he made the first of eight appearances as a guest on The Arsenio Hall Show over five years.
- On May 17, 1993, he made a guest appearance on the CBS show Murphy Brown. On the show, Candice Bergen's title character had frequently made reference to her hatred of Manilow's music, but after she became a mother, Manilow appeared to sing her a sweet version of his tune "I Am Your Child", winning her over with the song about a parent's bond with a child. Later that year he appeared in England on Surprise! Surprise! with Cilla Black where he performed the new single he had recorded with Cilla of "You'll Never Walk Alone".
- Guest appearance in a 2001 episode of Ally McBeal. He played both a hallucination of Ally's and himself on stage at the end of the show.
- Played himself in a cameo in the 2002 dark comedy Unconditional Love starring Kathy Bates and Rupert Everett where "Can't Smile Without You" also figured into the plot.
- On December 11, 2003, he appeared on the NBC show Will & Grace as himself backstage between tour stops. The name of the episode is "Fanilow" as in "a fan of Manilow".
- On April 20–21, 2004, Manilow reunited with Debra Byrd his former backup singer who is now the vocal coach at American Idol when he appeared as a guest judge and worked with the top seven finalists for the popular FOX variety prize show where the season three contestants sang his songs as the theme for the week.
- On December 8, 2004, he was a guest on the NBC special A Clay Aiken Christmas, hosted by the former Idol runner-up.
- On March 21–22, 2006, Manilow returned to American Idol in season five when 1950s music was the theme. He again helped the top eleven finalists to fine tune their performances and again sang on the results show.
- In November 2006, he appeared on Logo's reality show Jacob and Joshua: Nemesis Rising as himself in Las Vegas for a recording session with the twins.
- On November 23, 2006, Manilow appeared live on a float in the Macy's Thanksgiving Day Parade, and performed the song "What the World Needs Now" on the television broadcast of the parade.
- On December 2, 2006, Manilow was the celebrity guest and theme for the week on series 3 of The X Factor where he assisted the top four acts with their performances.
- On December 12, 2006, he appeared live at the 2006 Royal Variety Performance and performed a selection from his latest album.
- He appeared on The Tonight Show with Jay Leno on October 31, 2007, on November 17, 2008, and on July 12, 2011.
- He guest starred on Family Guy in "Back to the Woods" on February 17, 2008
- On December 4, 2008, he was the main guest on UK's The Graham Norton Show.
- He guest starred on Strictly Come Dancing on December 7, 2008.
- He narrated and performed original music for the animated television special Cranberry Christmas, which aired December 8, 2008, on ABC Family.
- On September 11, 2009, he was a guest on Friday Night with Jonathan Ross (UK).
- On October 2, 2009, he appeared on BBC Radio 4's Desert Island Discs.
- On December 10, 2009, he was a guest on The Jay Leno Show (US).
- On January 21, 2010, he was a guest on The Tonight Show with Conan O'Brien (US), where he explained that before he became famous, he wrote advertising jingles, including two well-known jingles for Band-Aid and State Farm. Also, he commented on his diet of "forgetting to eat".
- On February 6, 2010, he was a guest on Jimmy Kimmel Live! where Jimmy showed a photo of him in the 1970s and discussed his new album.
- On December 11, 2010, he ended the Nobel Peace Prize concert in Oslo, Norway singing four of his most known and popular songs. The Nobel Peace Prize was awarded to the Chinese dissident Liu Xiaobo.
- On March 25, 2011, Manilow, his band, and crew celebrated their one-year anniversary at the Paris Hotel in Las Vegas.
- On June 15, 2011, he appeared on Good Morning America performing his new album, "Fifteen Minutes".
- On June 23, 2011, he appeared on CNN's Piers Morgan Tonight.
- On June 24, 2011, he appeared on the UK's Paul O'Grady Live.
- On October 28, 2011, he was the star of the UK's show An Audience With... Barry Manilow.
- On December 11, 2011, he appeared on ITV's Text Santa: The Launch.
- On December 14, 2011, he appeared on the royal variety show on ITV.
- On January 23, 2013, he appeared on Katie (US). He sang a medley of songs for host Katie Couric and promoted his "Manilow on Broadway" show at the St. James Theatre scheduled to run January through February 2013.
- On July 3, 2013, he was on The Diane Rehm Show, where he discussed his career.
- On July 4, 2015, he sang on A Capitol Fourth—music and fireworks from Washington, D.C.
