= Marty Panzer =

American songwriter and lyricist

Marty Panzer (March 20, 1945) is an American songwriter and first song-writing partner of Barry Manilow. He is the author of over 30 songs recorded by Manilow and over a hundred songs for Disney Pictures. He also co-wrote the song "Through The Years", performed by Kenny Rogers.

His song-writing contributed to 35 gold and platinum albums. He is a recipient of the 1999 Annie Award for Music in a Feature Production. He also wrote songs to Disney's Pocahontas II: Journey to a New World and The Lion King II: Simba's Pride.

== Personal life ==
Panzer originates from Brooklyn, New York City, having been born and raised just blocks away from Manilow. They first met while working together in the CBS-TV mailroom in New York.

== See also ==
- Category:Songs with lyrics by Marty Panzer
