= Ultimate Manilow =

Greatest hits album by Barry Manilow
- Released: February 5, 2002
- Genres: Pop; easy listening
- Label: Arista

Barry Manilow chronology
Here at the Mayflower (2001)	Ultimate Manilow (2002)	A Christmas Gift of Love (2002)

Professional ratings
Review scores
Source	Rating
AllMusic	4.5/5 stars

Ultimate Manilow is a greatest hits album by Barry Manilow, released in 2002. Nearly every top 20 hit is included in this collection. This compilation is best known for setting the stage for a comeback for Manilow, as it debuted at No. 3 on the charts. While on a six-week tour to promote his latest album Here at the Mayflower, Manilow immediately extended it to a six-month tour. At the time Ultimate Manilow was released, no other compilations of Manilow's music were in print.

Ultimate Manilow, with a slightly different track listing (but with the same number of tracks), was also issued in the United Kingdom in 2004, charting first in March of that year.

== Track listing ==
USA release (February 5, 2002)
No.	Title	Writer(s)	Length
1.	"Mandy" (single version)	Richard Kerr; Scott English	3:15
2.	"It's a Miracle" (alternate mix)	Barry Manilow; Marty Panzer	3:48
3.	"Could It Be Magic" (album version)	Barry Manilow; Adrienne Anderson	6:44
4.	"I Write the Songs" (album version)	Bruce Johnston	3:46
5.	"Bandstand Boogie"	Charles Albertine; Larry Elgart; Bob Horn; Bruce Sussman; Barry Manilow; Les Elgart	2:48
6.	"Tryin' to Get the Feeling Again"	David Pomeranz	3:48
7.	"This One's for You"	Barry Manilow; Marty Panzer	3:22
8.	"Weekend in New England"	Randy Edelman	3:42
9.	"Looks Like We Made It"	Richard Kerr; Will Jennings	3:27
10.	"Daybreak" (studio recording, non-hit version)	Barry Manilow; Adrienne Anderson	3:02
11.	"Can't Smile Without You"	Christian Arnold; David Martin; Geoff Morrow	3:04
12.	"Even Now"	Barry Manilow; Marty Panzer	3:23
13.	"Copacabana (At the Copa)"	Barry Manilow; Jack Feldman; Bruce Sussman	5:38
14.	"Somewhere in the Night"	Richard Kerr; Will Jennings	3:19
15.	"Ready to Take a Chance Again" (mono version)	Charles Fox; Norman Gimbel	2:56
16.	"Ships"	Ian Hunter	3:56
17.	"I Made It Through the Rain"	Barry Manilow; Bruce Sussman; Jack Feldman; Drey Shepperd; Gerard Kenny	4:14
18.	"The Old Songs"	Buddy Kaye; David Pomeranz	4:38
19.	"When October Goes"	Barry Manilow; Johnny Mercer	3:55
20.	"Somewhere Down the Road"	Tom Snow; Cynthia Weil	3:57
Total length:			76:42

UK release, March 8, 2004
No.	Title	Writer(s)	Length
1.	"Mandy"	Richard Kerr; Scott English	3:15
2.	"Could It Be Magic"	Barry Manilow; Adrienne Anderson	6:44
3.	"I Write the Songs"	Bruce Johnston	3:46
4.	"Copacabana (At the Copa)"	Barry Manilow; Jack Feldman; Bruce Sussman	5:38
5.	"Can't Smile Without You"	Chris Arnold; David Martin; Geoff Morrow	3:04
6.	"Weekend in New England"	Randy Edelman	3:42
7.	"It's a Miracle"	Barry Manilow; Marty Panzer	3:48
8.	"Tryin' to Get the Feeling Again"	David Pomeranz	3:48
9.	"I Made It Through the Rain"	Barry Manilow; Bruce Sussman; Jack Feldman; Drey Shepperd; Gerard Kenny	4:14
10.	"Let's Hang On"	Bob Crewe; Denny Randell; Sandy Linzer	3:07
11.	"Somewhere in the Night"	Richard Kerr; Will Jennings	3:19
12.	"The Old Songs"	Buddy Kaye; David Pomeranz	4:38
13.	"You're Looking Hot Tonight"	Barry Manilow	3:54
14.	"Even Now"	Barry Manilow; Marty Panzer	3:23
15.	"Ready to Take a Chance Again"	Charles Fox; Norman Gimbel	2:56
16.	"Bermuda Triangle"	Barry Manilow; Bruce Sussman; Jack Feldman	3:46
17.	"Looks Like We Made It"	Richard Kerr; Will Jennings	3:27
18.	"Strangers in the Night"	Bert Kaempfert; Charles Singleton; Eddie Snyder	3:07
19.	"One Voice"	Barry Manilow	3:01
20.	"Who Needs to Dream"	Barry Manilow; Bruce Sussman; Jack Feldman	3:56
Total length:			76:33

Japan (May 22, 2002) & Australia release (September 16, 2002)
No.	Title	Writer(s)	Length
1.	"Could It Be Magic"	Barry Manilow; Adrienne Anderson	6:44
2.	"Let's Hang On"	Bob Crewe; Denny Randell; Sandy Linzer	3:07
3.	"Read 'Em and Weep"	Jim Steinman	5:25
4.	"Bermuda Triangle"	Barry Manilow; Bruce Sussman; Jack Feldman	3:46
5.	"Mandy"	Richard Kerr; Scott English	3:15
6.	"Can't Smile Without You"	Chris Arnold; David Martin; Geoff Morrow	3:04
7.	"I Made It Through the Rain"	Barry Manilow; Bruce Sussman; Jack Feldman; Drey Shepperd; Gerard Kenny	4:14
8.	"Some Kind Of Friend"	Barry Manilow; Adrienne Anderson	4:02
9.	"It’s a Miracle"	Barry Manilow; Marty Panzer	3:51
10.	"Somewhere in the Night"	Richard Kerr; Will Jennings	3:19
11.	"The Old Songs"	Buddy Kaye; David Pomeranz	4:38
12.	"You’re Looking Hot Tonight"	Barry Manilow	3:54
13.	"Even Now"	Barry Manilow; Marty Panzer	3:23
14.	"Copacabana (At The Copa)"	Barry Manilow; Bruce Sussman; Jack Feldman	5:38
15.	"Ready To Take A Chance Again"	Charles Fox; Norman Gimbel	2:56
16.	"I Write The Songs"	Bruce Johnston	3:46
17.	"Moonlight Serenade"	Glenn Miller	4:49
18.	"Strangers In The Night"	Bert Kaempfert; Charles Singleton; Eddie Snyder	3:07
19.	"Blue" (duet with Sarah Vaughan)	Barry Manilow; Bruce Sussman; Jack Feldman	4:19
Total length:			77:17

- Track information and credits for the US version were verified from the album's liner notes.
- Additional track information and credits for the UK, Australian and Japan versions were adapted from Discogs, AllMusic. and Manilow's official website.

== Charts ==
=== Weekly charts ===
Chart (2002–2004)	Peak position
Australian Albums (ARIA)	96
Danish Albums (Hitlisten)	32
Irish Albums (IRMA)	13
Scottish Albums (Official Charts)	10
Swedish Albums (Sverigetopplistan)	33
UK Albums (Official Charts)	8
US Billboard 200	3

=== Year-end charts ===
Chart (2002)	Position
US Billboard 200	64
Chart (2004)	Position
UK Albums (OCC)	90

== Certifications ==
Region	Certification	Certified units/sales
United Kingdom (BPI)	Platinum	300,000^{^}
United States (RIAA)	2× Platinum	2,000,000^{^}
^{^} Shipments figures based on certification alone.
