= Greatest Hits Volume III (Barry Manilow album) =

Greatest hits album by Barry Manilow
- Released: April 4, 1989
- Genres: Pop; Easy listening
- Length: 40:38
- Label: Arista
- Producers: Barry Manilow, Ron Dante, Jim Steinman, Eddie Arkin

Barry Manilow chronology
Greatest Hits Volume II (1989)	Greatest Hits Volume III (1989)	Live on Broadway (1990)

Professional ratings
Review scores
Source	Rating
Allmusic	3/5 stars

Greatest Hits Volume III is a compilation album released by Barry Manilow in 1989 on Arista Records. It was the third of a three-album series released that year, along with Volume I and Volume II.

== Track listing ==
No.	Title	Writer(s)	Original album	Length
1.	"Ships"	Ian Hunter	One Voice (1979)	4:02
2.	"Let's Hang On"	Bob Crewe; Sandy Linzer; Denny Randell	If I Should Love Again (1981)	3:10
3.	"Ready to Take a Chance Again"	Charles Fox; Norman Gimbel	Foul Play (Original Soundtrack) (1978)	3:03
4.	"Read 'Em and Weep"	Jim Steinman	Greatest Hits Vol. II (1983)	5:28
5.	"Somewhere Down the Road"	Cynthia Weil; Tom Snow	If I Should Love Again	3:59
6.	"One Voice"	Barry Manilow	One Voice (1979)	3:03
7.	"The Old Songs"	David Pomeranz; Buddy Kaye	If I Should Love Again	4:42
8.	"I Made It Through the Rain"	Gerard Kenny; Jack Feldman; Drey Shepperd; Bruce Sussman; Barry Manilow	Barry (1980)	4:26
9.	"Dirt Cheap"	Barry Manilow; Enoch Anderson	Previously unreleased	3:49
10.	"Memory"	Andrew Lloyd Webber; Trevor Nunn; T. S. Eliot	Here Comes the Night (1982)	4:56
Total length:				40:38

All track information and credits were taken from the CD liner notes.
