= The Songs 1975–1990 =

The Songs 1975-1990

Greatest hits album by Barry Manilow
- Released: 1990
- Genre: Pop; Easy listening
- Label: Arista

The Songs 1975–1990 is a Barry Manilow compilation album released in 1990, covering (as the title suggests) 15 years of chart hits.

The album reached the top 20 of the UK sales charts in 1990, his eleventh album to achieve this feat .

== Track listing ==
=== Disc 1 ===
1. "I Write the Songs" (Johnston) 3:53 (1976)
2. "One Voice" (Manilow) 3:01 (1979)
3. "The Old Songs" (Pomeranz/Kaye) 4:40 (1981)
4. "I Don't Wanna Walk Without You" (Styne/Loesser) 3:54 (1982)
5. "Some Good Things Never Last (Live with Debra Byrd & Dana Robbins)" (Radice) 4:13 (1990)
6. "Somewhere Down the Road" (Masser/Weil/Snow) 3:56 (1983)
7. "When I Wanted You" (Cunico) 3:31 (1979)
8. "Stay (Live)" (Jolis/Di Simone/Manilow) 3:17 (1983)
9. "Even Now" - (Manilow/Panzer) 3:28 (1978)
10. "Read 'Em And Weep" (Steinman) 5:24 (1983)
11. "Somewhere In The Night" (Jennings/Kerr) 3:26 (1975)
12. "I Made It Through the Rain" (Kenny/Sheppard) 4:23 (1980)
13. "Daybreak" (Manilow/Anderson) 3:06 (1977)
14. "Please Don't Be Scared" (Sterling) 5:38 (1989)
15. "Looks Like We Made It" (Kerr/Jennings) 3:32 (1976)
16. "Some Kind Of Friend" - Not on vinyl
17. "Bermuda Triangle" - Not on vinyl
18. "This One's For You" - Not on vinyl

=== Disc 2 ===
1. "Mandy" (English/Kerr) 3:19 (1974)
2. "If I Should Love Again (Live)" (Manilow) 5:18 (1981)
3. "All The Time" (Manilow/Panzer) 3:15 (1979)
4. "Copacabana (At The Copa)" (Manilow/Sussman/Feldman) 5:43 (1978)
5. "Keep Each Other Warm" (Hill/Sinfield) 4:37 (1989)
6. "Weekend In New England" (Edelman) 3:44 (1978)
7. "Lonely Together" (Nolan) 4:19 (1980)
8. "Can't Smile Without You" (Arnold/Martin/Morrow) 3:11 (1978)
9. "Tryin' To Get The Feeling Again" (Pomeranz) 3:41 (1978)
10. "Could It Be Magic" (Manilow/Anderson) 6:47 (1979)
11. "Brooklyn Blues" (Manilow/Sussman/Feldman) 5:08 (1987)
12. "Who Needs To Dream" (Manilow/Butler/Sussman/Feldman) 3:55 (1985)
13. "Ready To Take A Chance Again" (Fox/Gimbel) 3:01 (1978)
14. "If I Can Dream (Live)" (Brown) 4:41 (1990)
15. "Ships" - Not on vinyl
16. "London" - Not on vinyl

== Certifications ==
Region	Certification	Certified units/sales
United Kingdom (BPI)	Silver	60,000^{^}
^{^} Shipments figures based on certification alone.
