= Greatest Hits Vol. II (Barry Manilow album) =

Greatest hits album by Barry Manilow
- Released: December 1983
- Genre: Pop
- Length: 44:05
- Label: Arista
- Producers: Barry Manilow & Ron Dante, Jim Steinman

Barry Manilow chronology
Here Comes the Night (1982)	Greatest Hits Vol. II (1983)	2:00 AM Paradise Cafe (1984)

Greatest Hits Vol. II is the thirteenth album released by singer-songwriter Barry Manilow in 1983. In Britain, Manilow's first Greatest Hits album had been issued as Manilow Magic, thus this second volume was issued there as A Touch More Magic.

The album was mostly compilation, with the exception of three new tracks: "You're Looking Hot Tonight", "Put a Quarter in the Jukebox" and "Read 'Em and Weep" #1 A/C (for 6 weeks) and #18 in the United States, his last Top 40 on the Hot 100 to date, and also a cover of the Meat Loaf song of the same name, albeit with an altered second verse and instrumental arrangement). The album reached platinum sales in 1993.

In 1989, Arista deleted this album, and its 1978 predecessor. However, Arista repackaged these two prior compilations into a series of three budget-oriented hits collections, released simultaneously: Greatest Hits, Volume I, with its tracklisting similar to Record One of the 1978 double album (with "Some Kind Of Friend" replacing "Ready To Take A Chance Again"; Greatest Hits, Volume II, which corresponds to Record Two of the 1978 double album, with a previously unreleased song, "You're My Only Girl (Jenny)", added, and Greatest Hits, Volume III, which features eight songs from this album. "You're Lookin' Hot Tonight" and "Put A Quarter In The Jukebox" are omitted but adds "Ready To Take A Chance Again" and the previously unreleased "Dirt Cheap".

== Track listing ==
Side one
No.	Title	Writer(s)	Length
1.	"Ships"	Ian Hunter	3:46
2.	"Some Kind of Friend"	Barry Manilow; Adrienne Anderson	4:04
3.	"I Made It Through the Rain"	Gerard Kenny; Drey Shepperd; Barry Manilow; Bruce Sussman; Jack Feldman	4:08
4.	"Read 'Em and Weep"	Jim Steinman	5:28
5.	"Put a Quarter in the Jukebox" (with Ronnie Milsap)	Barry Manilow	3:27
6.	"Somewhere Down the Road"	Cynthia Weil; Tom Snow	3:58

Side two
No.	Title	Writer(s)	Length
7.	"One Voice"	Barry Manilow	3:01
8.	"The Old Songs"	David Pomeranz; Buddy Kaye	4:14
9.	"Let's Hang On"	Bob Crewe; Sandy Linzer; Denny Randell	3:08
10.	"Memory"	Andrew Lloyd Webber; Trevor Nunn; T. S. Eliot	4:54
11.	"You're Lookin' Hot Tonight"	Barry Manilow	3:57
Total length:			44:05

== Charts ==
Chart (1983)	Position
United States (Billboard 200)	30
United Kingdom (Official Charts Company)	10

== Certifications ==
Region	Certification	Certified units/sales
United Kingdom (BPI)	Gold	100,000^{^}
United States (RIAA)	Platinum	1,000,000^{^}
^{^} Shipments figures based on certification alone.
