= Greatest Hits: The Platinum Collection =

Greatest hits album by Barry Manilow
- Released: 1993
- Genre: Pop; Easy listening
- Length: 75:38
- Label: Arista

Barry Manilow chronology
Hidden Treasures (1993)	Greatest Hits: The Platinum Collection (1993)	Singin' with the Big Bands (1994)

Alternative cover
- UK cover for the album

Professional ratings
Review scores
Source	Rating
AllMusic	4.5/5 stars
Music Week	4/5 stars

Greatest Hits: The Platinum Collection is a compilation album by American singer-songwriter Barry Manilow, released in 1993. All of the compilation's songs had been previously released, with the exception of the 1993 remixes of "Could It Be Magic" and "I'm Your Man".

== Track listing ==
No.	Title	Writer(s)	Length
1.	"Could It Be Magic" (1993 Version)	Barry Manilow; Adrienne Anderson	4:54
2.	"Bermuda Triangle"	Manilow; Bruce Sussman; Jack Feldman	3:48
3.	"Hey Mambo"	Manilow; Sussman; Feldman; Tom Kelly	2:54
4.	"I Wanna Do It with You"	Layng Martine Jr.	3:43
5.	"Let's Hang On"	Bob Crewe; Denny Randell; Sandy Linzer	3:09
6.	"Some Kind of Friend"	Manilow; Anderson	4:05
7.	"Copacabana (At the Copa)" (The 1993 Remix)	Manilow; Sussman; Feldman	4:06
8.	"I'm Your Man" (1993 Remix)	Manilow; Allan Rich; Howie Rice	4:47
9.	"Mandy"	Scott English; Richard Kerr	3:21
10.	"Can't Smile Without You"	Christian Arnold; David Martin; Geoff Morrow	3:13
11.	"Tryin' to Get the Feeling Again"	David Pomeranz	3:53
12.	"I Made It Through the Rain"	Manilow; Sussman; Feldman; Gerard Kenny; Drey Shepperd	4:27
13.	"Read 'Em and Weep"	Jim Steinman	5:27
14.	"Somewhere in the Night"	Kerr; Will Jennings	3:28
15.	"Lonely Together"	Kenny Nolan	4:23
16.	"Stay" (Live)	Manilow; Kevin DiSimone; James Jolis	3:34
17.	"If I Should Love Again"	Manilow	5:32
18.	"I Write the Songs"	Bruce Johnston	3:56
19.	"One Voice" (Live)	Manilow	3:05

== Charts ==
Chart (1993)	Peak position
Australian Albums (ARIA)	6
UK Albums (Official Charts)	37

== Certifications ==
Region	Certification	Certified units/sales
Australia (ARIA)	Platinum	70,000^{^}
United Kingdom (BPI) as The Platinum Collection	Silver	60,000^{^}
United Kingdom (BPI) as Greatest Hits - The Platinum Collection	Silver	60,000^{^}
^{^} Shipments figures based on certification alone.
