= Greatest Hits (Barry Manilow album) =

Greatest hits album by Barry Manilow
- Released: November 1978
- Genre: Pop
- Length: 70:52; 68:49 (CD)
- Label: Arista
- Producers: Barry Manilow, Ron Dante

Barry Manilow chronology
Even Now (1978)	Greatest Hits (1978)	One Voice (1979)

Singles from Greatest Hits
- 1. "Mandy (reissue)" Released: 1978

Greatest Hits is the first greatest hits album by singer/songwriter Barry Manilow, released in 1978. The album was certified 3× Platinum in the US, and would be Manilow's last of that certification, as of 2021. It features the then new single, "Ready to Take a Chance Again", which reached No. 11 in the US the same year.

In some European countries the album was released as Manilow Magic: The Best of Barry Manilow The Very Best of Barry Manilow, or simply The Best Of Barry Manilow. It was a single LP with either 11 or 12 tracks.

== Release history ==
The US CD version has been released in three slightly different incarnations, with different versions of three songs being used. Due to technical limitations in place at the time of release, "Jump Shout Boogie" was omitted from all three versions.

The first commercial CD pressing featured the single version of "Copacabana", the live version of "Daybreak", and a shortened version of "It's A Miracle". This version has a DADC code of DIDX162, ansd a total disc time of 69:06.

The second and third versions were manufactured for the Columbia House record club, both with the DADC code of DIDY479.

The first Columbia House CD pressing featured the extended version of "Copacabana", the live version of "Daybreak", and a shortened version of "It's A Miracle", with a total disc time of 70:50.

The second Columbia House CD pressing (also with the DADC code of DIDY479) features the single version of "Copacabana", the studio version of "Daybreak", and a remixed version of "It's A Miracle". This version has a total disc time of 68:49.

In 1989, Arista deleted this album, and its 1983 follow-up. However, Arista repackaged these two prior compilations into a series of three budget-oriented hits collections, released simultaneously: Greatest Hits, Volume I, with its tracklisting similar to Record One of the 1978 double album (with "Some Kind Of Friend" replacing "Ready To Take A Chance Again"; Greatest Hits, Volume II, which corresponds to Record Two of the 1978 double album, with a previously unreleased song, "You're My Only Girl (Jenny)", added, and Greatest Hits, Volume III, which features eight songs from the original 1983 "Greatest Hits 2" album. "You're Lookin' Hot Tonight" and "Put A Quarter In The Jukebox" are omitted but adds "Ready To Take A Chance Again" and the previously unreleased "Dirt Cheap".

Professional ratings
Review scores
Source	Rating
AllMusic	link

== Track listing ==
Side one

1. "Mandy" (single version) - 3:15
2. "New York City Rhythm" - 4:42
3. "Ready to Take a Chance Again" (in mono) (From the Foul Play soundtrack) - 3:01
4. "Looks Like We Made It" - 3:33
5. "Daybreak" (Live) - 3:36

Side two

1. "Can't Smile Without You" - 3:13
2. "It's a Miracle" (extended single mix) - 3:42
3. "Even Now" - 3:28
4. "Bandstand Boogie" - 2:49
5. "Tryin' to Get the Feeling Again" - 3:51

Side three

1. "Could It Be Magic" (album version) - 6:50
2. "Somewhere in the Night" - 3:26
3. "Jump Shout Boogie" - 3:03
4. "Weekend in New England" - 3:43
5. "All the Time" - 3:15

Side four

1. "This One's for You" - 3:25
2. "Copacabana (At the Copa) (Disco)" - 5:46
3. "Beautiful Music" - 4:32
4. "I Write the Songs" - 3:51

== Charts ==
=== Album ===
Chart (1978/79)	Position
US Billboard 200	7
Australia (Kent Music Report)	26
United Kingdom (Official Charts Company)	3

=== Singles ===
Title	Date	Chart	Peak position
"Ready to Take a Chance Again"	November 17, 1978	US Billboard Hot 100	11

== Certifications ==
Region	Certification	Certified units/sales
Australia (ARIA)	Platinum	70,000^{^}
United Kingdom (BPI) Manilow Magic	Platinum	300,000^{^}
United Kingdom (BPI) The Best Of Barry Manilow	Platinum	300,000^{^}
United Kingdom (BPI) The Very Best Of Barry Manilow	Gold	100,000^{^}
United States (RIAA)	3× Platinum	3,000,000^{^}
^{^} Shipments figures based on certification alone.
