= Barry Live in Britain =

Live album by Barry Manilow
- Released: 1982; January 25, 1993 (re-release)
- Recorded: 11, 12 January 1982
- Venue: Royal Albert Hall, London
- Genre: Pop; Easy listening
- Label: Arista
- Producer: Barry Manilow, Michael DeLugg

Barry Manilow chronology
If I Should Love Again (1981)	Barry Live in Britain (1982)	Here Comes the Night (1982)

Professional ratings
Review scores
Source	Rating
Allmusic	(Not Rated) link

Barry Live in Britain is the eleventh album released by singer and songwriter Barry Manilow. The album was recorded live at the Royal Albert Hall in London in January 1982 with Victor Vanacore as the musical director. It was a huge success in Britain, soaring to number one on the charts, reaching platinum status., but was not issued by Arista in the U.S.

The LP contains one new song that became a hit single, "Stay" that reached #23 in the UK.

== Track listing ==
=== Side 1 ===
1. "It's a Miracle/London" - 5:10
2. "The Old Songs Medley" - 9:45
3. "Even Now" - 3:30
4. "Stay" - 3:15
5. "Beautiful Music/I Made It Through the Rain" - 7:15

=== Side 2 ===
1. "Bermuda Triangle" - 4:05
2. "Break Down The Door/Who's Been Sleeping In My Bed" - 5:05
3. "Copacabana (At The Copa)" - 3:40
4. "Could It Be Magic/Mandy" - 5:40
5. "London/We'll Meet Again" - 4:25
6. "One Voice" - 3:04
7. "It's a Miracle" - 1:05

== Personnel ==
- Barry Manilow - vocals
- John Pondel - guitar
- Carl Sealove - bass
- Robert Marullo, Victor Vanacore - keyboards
- Bud Harner - drums
- Robert Forte - percussion
- Bill Page - woodwind

== Charts ==
Chart (1982)	Position
United Kingdom (Official Charts Company)	1

== Certifications ==
Region	Certification	Certified units/sales
United Kingdom (BPI)	Platinum	300,000^{^}
^{^} Shipments figures based on certification alone.
