= Even Now Tour =

1978 concert tour by Barry Manilow

- Tour by Barry Manilow
- Poster to the concerts in Cuyahoga Falls, Ohio
- Associated album: Even Now
- Start date: June 23, 1978
- End date: November 3, 1978
- Legs: 2
- No. of shows: 66 in North America; 11 in Europe; 77 total

Barry Manilow concert chronology
- This One's for You Tour (1976-77); Even Now Tour (1978); 1980 World Tour (1980)

The Even Now Tour (also known as the North American Tour and advertised as Barry Manilow in Concert) is the fourth concert tour by American recording artist Barry Manilow. The tour supports his fifth studio album Even Now (1978). Beginning in the summer of 1978, Manilow performed over 60 shows in North America and, marks the first time the singer performed in Europe.

During this jaunt, Manilow played 15 shows at the Greek Theatre in Los Angeles, California; performing for 72,000 people. Footage of the concerts became the singer's first HBO special, airing in 1979.

== Opening act ==
- Eddy Arnold (Holmdel Township)

== Setlist ==
The following setlist was obtained from the concert held on July 17, 1978, at the Blossom Music Center in Cuyahoga Falls, Ohio. It does not represent all concerts for the duration of the tour.

Act I

1. "Here We Go Again"
2. "New York City Rhythm"
3. "Daybreak"
4. "Even Now"
5. "Jump Shout Boogie" / "Avenue C" / "Jumpin' at the Woodside" / "Cloudburst" / "Bandstand Boogie"
6. "Ready to Take a Chance Again"
7. "Weekend in New England"
8. "Looks Like We Made It"
9. "A Very Strange Medley"

Act II

10. "Beautiful Music"
11. "I Was a Fool (To Let You Go)"
12. "All the Time"
13. "Copacabana (At the Copa)"
14. "Tryin' to Get the Feeling Again" / "This One's for You" / "Could It Be Magic" / "Mandy" / "Could It Be Magic" (Reprise)
15. "It's a Miracle"
16. "Can't Smile Without You"

Encore

17. "I Write the Songs"

== Tour dates ==
Date	City	Country	Venue
North America
June 23, 1978	Providence	United States	Providence Civic Center
June 24, 1978	Providence	United States	Providence Civic Center
June 25, 1978	Providence	United States	Providence Civic Center
June 28, 1978	Columbia	United States	Merriweather Post Pavilion
June 29, 1978	Columbia	United States	Merriweather Post Pavilion
June 30, 1978	Columbia	United States	Merriweather Post Pavilion
July 1, 1978	Columbia	United States	Merriweather Post Pavilion
July 3, 1978	Holmdel Township	United States	Garden State Arts Center
July 4, 1978	Holmdel Township	United States	Garden State Arts Center
July 5, 1978	Holmdel Township	United States	Garden State Arts Center
July 6, 1978	Holmdel Township	United States	Garden State Arts Center
July 7, 1978	Holmdel Township	United States	Garden State Arts Center
July 8, 1978	Holmdel Township	United States	Garden State Arts Center
July 9, 1978	Saratoga Springs	United States	Saratoga Performing Arts Center
July 12, 1978	Philadelphia	United States	Robin Hood Dell West
July 13, 1978	Philadelphia	United States	Robin Hood Dell West
July 16, 1978	Cuyahoga Falls	United States	Blossom Music Center
July 17, 1978	Cuyahoga Falls	United States	Blossom Music Center
July 18, 1978	Cuyahoga Falls	United States	Blossom Music Center
July 20, 1978	Clarkston	United States	Pine Knob Music Theatre
July 21, 1978	Clarkston	United States	Pine Knob Music Theatre
July 22, 1978	Clarkston	United States	Pine Knob Music Theatre
July 23, 1978	Clarkston	United States	Pine Knob Music Theatre
July 25, 1978	Highland Park	United States	Ravinia Pavilion
July 26, 1978	Highland Park	United States	Ravinia Pavilion
July 28, 1978	New York City	United States	Forest Hills Stadium
July 29, 1978	New York City	United States	Forest Hills Stadium
July 31, 1978	Boston	United States	Harvard Stadium
August 3, 1978	Las Vegas	United States	Versailles Room
August 4, 1978	Las Vegas	United States	Versailles Room
August 5, 1978	Las Vegas	United States	Versailles Room
August 8, 1978	Las Vegas	United States	Versailles Room
August 9, 1978	Las Vegas	United States	Versailles Room
August 10, 1978	Las Vegas	United States	Versailles Room
August 11, 1978	Las Vegas	United States	Versailles Room
August 12, 1978	Las Vegas	United States	Versailles Room
August 13, 1978	Las Vegas	United States	Versailles Room
August 14, 1978	Las Vegas	United States	Versailles Room
August 15, 1978	Las Vegas	United States	Versailles Room
August 16, 1978	Las Vegas	United States	Versailles Room
August 19, 1978	Morrison	United States	Red Rocks Amphitheatre
August 20, 1978	Morrison	United States	Red Rocks Amphitheatre
August 22, 1978^{[A]}	Chicago	United States	Hyatt Regency Ballroom
August 23, 1978	Concord	United States	Concord Pavilion
August 24, 1978	Concord	United States	Concord Pavilion
August 27, 1978	Los Angeles	United States	Greek Theatre
August 28, 1978	Los Angeles	United States	Greek Theatre
August 29, 1978	Los Angeles	United States	Greek Theatre
August 30, 1978	Los Angeles	United States	Greek Theatre
August 31, 1978	Los Angeles	United States	Greek Theatre
September 1, 1978	Los Angeles	United States	Greek Theatre
September 2, 1978	Los Angeles	United States	Greek Theatre
September 3, 1978	Los Angeles	United States	Greek Theatre
September 12, 1978	Los Angeles	United States	Greek Theatre
September 13, 1978	Los Angeles	United States	Greek Theatre
September 14, 1978	Los Angeles	United States	Greek Theatre
September 15, 1978	Los Angeles	United States	Greek Theatre
September 16, 1978	Los Angeles	United States	Greek Theatre
September 17, 1978	Los Angeles	United States	Greek Theatre
September 18, 1978	Los Angeles	United States	Greek Theatre
September 22, 1978	Cincinnati	United States	Riverfront Coliseum
September 24, 1978	Uniondale	United States	Nassau Veterans Memorial Coliseum
September 25, 1978	Philadelphia	United States	Spectrum
September 26, 1978	Philadelphia	United States	Spectrum
September 29, 1978	Chicago	United States	Chicago Stadium
September 30, 1978	Chicago	United States	Chicago Stadium
Europe
October 9, 1978	London	England	London Palladium
October 10, 1978	London	England	London Palladium
October 11, 1978	London	England	London Palladium
October 12, 1978	London	England	London Palladium
October 13, 1978	London	England	London Palladium
October 14, 1978	London	England	London Palladium
October 16, 1978	Amsterdam	Netherlands	Concertgebouw
October 23, 1978	London	England	Royal Albert Hall
October 25, 1978	Paris	France	L'Olympia
October 31, 1978	Frankfurt	West Germany	Jahrhunderthalle
November 3, 1978	Munich	West Germany	Kongressaal

Festivals and other miscellaneous performances
^{A} This concert was a part of the "Radio Programming Conference"

Cancellations and rescheduled shows

July 22, 1978	Saint Paul, Minnesota	St. Paul Civic Center	Cancelled
July 23, 1978	St. Louis, Missouri	Checkerdome	Cancelled
October 18, 1978	Copenhagen, Denmark	Falkoner Teatret	Cancelled
October 26, 1978	Brussels, Belgium	Cirque Royal	Cancelled

=== Box office score data ===
Venue	City	Tickets Sold / Available	Gross Revenue
Red Rocks Amphitheatre	Morrison	18,000 / 18,000 (100%)	$177,218
Concord Pavilion	Concord	15,298 / 15,298 (100%)	$128,074
Riverfront Coliseum	Cincinnati	12,105 / 12,105 (100%)	$136,666
