= Greatest Hits Volume I (Barry Manilow album) =

Greatest hits album by Barry Manilow
- Released: 1989
- Genre: Pop; Easy listening
- Length: 36:14
- Label: Arista

Barry Manilow chronology
Barry Manilow (1989)	Greatest Hits Volume I (1989)	Greatest Hits Volume II (1989)

Professional ratings
Review scores
Source	Rating
Allmusic	4/5 stars

Greatest Hits Volume I is a compilation album released by Barry Manilow in 1989 on Arista Records. It was the first of a three-album series released that year, along with Volume II and Volume III.

== Track listing ==
No.	Title	Writer(s)	Original album	Length
1.	"Mandy"	Scott English; Richard Kerr	Barry Manilow II (1974)	3:23
2.	"New York City Rhythm"	Barry Manilow; Marty Panzer	Tryin' to Get the Feeling (1975)	4:43
3.	"Looks Like We Made It"	Richard Kerr; Will Jennings	This One's for You (1976)	3:36
4.	"Daybreak"	Barry Manilow; Adrienne Anderson	This One's for You	3:09
5.	"Can't Smile Without You"	Chris Arnold; David Martin; Geoff Morrow	Even Now (1978)	3:13
6.	"It's a Miracle"	Barry Manilow; Marty Panzer	Barry Manilow II	3:55
7.	"Even Now"	Barry Manilow; Marty Panzer	Even Now	3:31
8.	"Bandstand Boogie"	Charles Albertine; Larry Elgart; Les Elgart; Bob Horn; Barry Manilow; Bruce Sussman	Tryin' to Get the Feeling	2:51
9.	"Tryin' to Get the Feeling Again"	David Pomeranz	Tryin' to Get the Feeling	3:51
10.	"Some Kind of Friend"	Barry Manilow; Adrienne Anderson	Here Comes the Night (1982)	4:02
Total length:				36:14

All track information and credits were taken from the CD liner notes.
