= Greatest Hits Volume II (Barry Manilow album) =

Greatest hits album by Barry Manilow
- Released: 1989
- Genre: Pop, easy listening
- Length: 41:54
- Label: Arista
- Producer: Barry Manilow, Ron Dante, Michael Masser

Barry Manilow chronology
Greatest Hits Volume I (1989)	Greatest Hits Volume II (1989)	Greatest Hits Volume III (1989)

Professional ratings
Review scores
Source	Rating
Allmusic	4/5 stars

Greatest Hits Volume II is a compilation album released by Barry Manilow in 1989 on Arista Records. It was the second of a three-album series released that year, along with Volume I and Volume III.

== Track listing ==
No.	Title	Writer(s)	Original album	Length
1.	"Could It Be Magic"	Barry Manilow; Adrienne Anderson	Barry Manilow (1973)	6:50
2.	"Somewhere in the Night"	Richard Kerr; Will Jennings	Even Now (1978)	3:28
3.	"Jump Shout Boogie"	Barry Manilow; Bruce Sussman	This One's for You (1976)	3:06
4.	"Weekend in New England"	Randy Edelman	This One's for You	3:47
5.	"All the Time"	Barry Manilow; Marty Panzer	This One's for You	3:17
6.	"This One's for You"	Barry Manilow; Marty Panzer	This One's for You	3:31
7.	"Copacabana (At the Copa)"	Barry Manilow; Bruce Sussman; Jack Feldman	Even Now	5:46
8.	"Beautiful Music"	Barry Manilow; Marty Panzer	Tryin' to Get the Feeling (1975)	4:39
9.	"I Write the Songs"	Bruce Johnston	Tryin' to Get the Feeling	3:56
10.	"You're My Only Girl (Jenny)"	Barry Manilow; Michael Masser; John Bettis	Previously unreleased	3:34
Total length:				41:54

All track information and credits were taken from the CD liner notes.
