= Here at the Mayflower =

Studio album by Barry Manilow
- Released: November 13, 2001
- Genre: Pop; Easy listening
- Length: 78:48
- Label: Concord
- Producer: Barry Manilow; David Benson

Barry Manilow chronology
Manilow Sings Sinatra (1998)	Here at the Mayflower (2001)	Ultimate Manilow (2002)

Professional ratings
Review scores
Source	Rating
AllMusic	4/5 stars

Here at the Mayflower is the nineteenth studio album by Barry Manilow, released in 2001. It was Manilow's first to include all original material since 2:00 AM Paradise Cafe in 1984. (Note: His 1985 studio album, Manilow, contains one cover) His next album of original songs, 15 Minutes, would not be released until 2011. The album concept (designed by album cover designer Dennis Purcell) is based on the Brooklyn, New York, apartment complex Manilow grew up in. Two singles, "Turn the Radio Up" and "They Dance!", reached the top 30 on the Billboard Adult Contemporary chart.

It was also his first album with new label Concord Records. Manilow left Arista Records after a span of over 20 years there (with the exception of two years at the RCA label between 1985 and 1986). There were different covers for the US and UK versions.

On the UK version of this album, American Idol vocal coach Debra Byrd, Manilow's longtime backup singer, makes an uncredited appearance on "Say Goodbye" and "I Don't Wanna Know". Also only on this release, "She Should'a Been Mine" and "The Night That Tito Played" features dialogue by Manilow.

== Track listing ==
=== US version ===
All tracks composed by Barry Manilow; except where indicated

1. Elevator Operator: "Do You Know Who's Livin' Next Door?" (Barry Manilow, Enoch Anderson) - 3:50
2. Apartments 3B and 5N: "Come Monday" - 3:56
3. Apartment 3E: "Border Train" (Barry Manilow, Enoch Anderson) - 4:44
4. Apartment 2H: "Turn The Radio Up" - 3:10
5. Apartment 2G: "I Hear Her Playing Music" (Barry Manilow, Enoch Anderson) - 4:08
6. Apartment 4J: "Talk To Me" (Barry Manilow, Marty Panzer) - 5:16
7. Apartment 6C: "Not What You See" - 4:52
8. Elevator Operator: "Freddie Said" - 2:04
9. Apartment 1A: "Some Bar By The Harbor" (Barry Manilow, Enoch Anderson) - 4:59
10. Apartment 2H: "Say Goodbye" - 4:07
11. Elevator Operator: "She Should'a Been Mine" (Barry Manilow, Bruce Sussman) - 3:33
12. Apartment 4G: "The Night That Tito Played" (Barry Manilow, Adrienne Anderson) - 3:18
13. Apartment 5F: "I'm Comin'" Back - 3:23
14. Apartment 6C: "I Miss You" (Barry Manilow, Marty Panzer) - 3:18
15. Elevator Operator: "They Dance!" - 3:07
16. Apartment 3E: "Welcome Home" (Barry Manilow, Mindy Sterling, Eddie Arkin) - 4:54

=== K-Mart Limited Edition ===
1. Elevator Operator: "Do You Know Who's Livin' Next Door?" - 3:50
2. Apartments 3B and 5N: "Come Monday" - 3:56
3. Apartment 3E: "Border Train" - 4:44
4. Apartment 2H: "Turn The Radio Up" - 3:10
5. Apartment 2G: "I Hear Her Playing Music" - 4:08
6. Apartment 4J: "Talk To Me" - 5:16
7. Apartment 6C: "Not What You See" - 4:52
8. Elevator Operator: "Freddie Said" - 2:04
9. Apartment 1A: "Some Bar By The Harbor" - 4:59
10. Apartment 2H: "Say Goodbye" - 4:07
11. Elevator Operator: "She Should'a Been Mine" - 3:33
12. Apartment 4G: "The Night That Tito Played" - 3:18
13. Apartment 5F: "I'm Comin'" Back - 3:23
14. Apartment 6C: "I Miss You" - 3:18
15. Elevator Operator: "They Dance!" - 3:07
16. Apartment 3E: "Welcome Home" - 4:54
17. Apartment 1A: "Shadow Man" - 4:07

=== Japan version ===
1. Elevator Operator: "Do You Know Who's Livin' Next Door?" - 3:50
2. Apartments 3B and 5N: "Come Monday" - 3:56
3. Apartment 3E: "Border Train" - 4:44
4. Apartment 2H: "Turn The Radio Up" - 3:10
5. Apartment 2G: "I Hear Her Playing Music" - 4:08
6. Apartment 4J: "Talk To Me" - 5:16
7. Apartment 6C: "Not What You See" - 4:52
8. Elevator Operator: "Freddie Said" - 2:04
9. Apartment 1A: "Some Bar By The Harbor" - 4:59
10. Apartment 2H: "Say Goodbye" - 4:07
11. Elevator Operator: "She Should'a Been Mine" - 3:33
12. Apartment 4G: "The Night That Tito Played" - 3:18
13. Apartment 5F: "I'm Comin'" Back - 3:23
14. Apartment 6C: "I Miss You" - 3:18
15. Elevator Operator: "They Dance!" - 3:07
16. Apartment 3E: "Welcome Home" - 4:54
17. Apartment 5F: "I Don't Wanna Know" - 3:48
18. Apartment 1A: "Shadow Man" - 4:07

=== UK version ===
1. Elevator Operator: "Do You Know Who's Livin' Next Door?" - 3:50
2. Apartments 3B and 5N: "Come Monday" - 3:56
3. Apartment 3E: "Border Train" - 4:44
4. Apartment 2H: "Turn The Radio Up" - 3:10
5. Apartment 2G: "I Hear Her Playing Music" - 4:08
6. Apartment 4J: "Talk To Me" - 5:16
7. Apartment 6C: "Not What You See" - 4:52
8. Elevator Operator: "Freddie Said" - 2:04
9. Apartment 1A: "Some Bar By The Harbor" - 4:59
10. Apartment 2H: "Say Goodbye" - 4:07
11. Elevator Operator: "She Should'a Been Mine" - 3:33
12. Apartment 4G: "The Night That Tito Played" - 3:18
13. Apartment 5F: "I'm Comin'" Back - 3:23
14. Apartment 6C: "I Miss You" - 3:18
15. Elevator Operator: "They Dance!" - 3:07
16. Apartment 3E: "Welcome Home" - 4:54
17. Elevator Operator: "Life Has Its Ups and Downs" - 2:26
18. Apartment 5F: "I Don't Wanna Know" - 4:05

=== Exclusive 2002 Tour Bonus Disc ===
1. Apartment 5F: "I Don't Wanna Know" - 3:48
2. Elevator Operator: "The Walking Wounded" (Barry Manilow/Enoch Anderson) - 4:26
3. Elevator Operator: "They Dance! (Extended Version)" - 4:04
