= Summer of '78 =

Studio album by Barry Manilow
- Released: November 19, 1996
- Studios: Starstruck Studios, Soundshop Recording Studios and Sound Kitchen (Nashville, Tennessee)
- Genres: Pop; easy listening
- Length: 38:59
- Label: Arista
- Producer: Michael Omartian

Barry Manilow chronology
Singin' with the Big Bands (1994)	Summer of '78 (1996)	Manilow Sings Sinatra (1998)

Professional ratings
Review scores
Source	Rating
Allmusic	3/5 stars
Entertainment Weekly	C

Summer of '78 (stylized in all lowercase) is an album by singer-songwriter Barry Manilow, released in 1996. The album is a collection of cover versions of popular songs, mostly from the late 1970s, and was recorded in Nashville, Tennessee.

== Track listing ==
No.	Title	Writer(s)	Original performer	Length
1.	"Summer of '78"	Barry Manilow, Bruce Sussman		1:48
2.	"Interlude: Love's Theme"	Barry White	Barry White	0:25
3.	"Reminiscing"	Graham Goble	Little River Band	3:45
4.	"I Go Crazy"	Paul Davis	Paul Davis	4:09
5.	"When I Need You"	Albert Hammond, Carole Bayer Sager	Leo Sayer	4:02
6.	"The Air That I Breathe"	Albert Hammond, Mike Hazlewood	Albert Hammond	3:43
7.	"Bluer Than Blue"	Randy Goodrum	Michael Johnson	2:58
8.	"We've Got Tonight"	Bob Seger	Bob Seger	4:39
9.	"I'd Really Love to See You Tonight"	Parker McGee	England Dan & John Ford Coley	3:18
10.	"Sometimes When We Touch"	Barry Mann, Dan Hill	Dan Hill	4:11
11.	"Never My Love"	Dick Addrisi, Don Addrisi	The Association	2:58
12.	"Just Remember I Love You"	Rick Roberts	Firefall	3:03

== Personnel ==
- Barry Manilow – vocals, arrangements (1, 6, 8, 9, 11, 12), keyboards (12), synthesizers (12)
- Michael Omartian – acoustic piano, electric piano, synth bass, arrangements (1, 3–5, 7, 9, 10), keyboards (12), synthesizers (12)
- Tim Akers – synthesizers, keyboards (12)
- Blair Masters – synthesizers
- Jerry McPherson – electric guitars
- Biff Watson – acoustic guitars
- Dann Huff – electric guitars (4, 5, 8, 10)
- Mike Brignardello – guitars (9), bass (9)
- Tom Hemby – guitars (9), bass (9)
- Jimmie Lee Sloas – bass
- John Hammond – drums
- Paul Leim – drums
- Eric Darken – percussion (4, 6–8, 10)
- Love Unlimited Orchestra – orchestra (2)
- Bonnie Keen – backing vocals (3, 5)
- Marty McCall – backing vocals (3–5, 8)
- Michael Mellett – backing vocals (3, 5, 8)
- Chris Rodriguez – backing vocals (3, 5, 8)

=== Production ===
- Michael Omartian – producer
- Terry Christian – engineer, mixing
- Scott Ahaus – assistant engineer
- David Benson – assistant engineer
- Mark Capps – assistant engineer
- John Dickson – assistant engineer
- Greg Parker – assistant engineer
- John Thomas II – assistant engineer, mix assistant
- Denny Purcell – mastering at Georgetown Masters (Nashville, Tennessee)
- Suzy Martinez – production coordinator
- Mark Hulett – production coordinator, personal assistant
- Sheri G. Lee – art direction
- Firooz Zamedi – cover photography
- Albert Sanchez – interior photography
- Phillip Bloch – stylist
- Eric Barnard – grooming
- Stiletto Entertainment – management

== Charts ==
Chart (1996)	Peak position
UK Albums (Official Charts)	66
US Billboard 200	82
