= Singin' with the Big Bands =

Studio album by Barry Manilow
- Released: 1994
- Studio: Edison Studios (New York, NY); Capitol Studios, Ocean Way Recording and Sunset Sound (Hollywood, CA); Westlake Audio (Los Angeles, CA)
- Genre: Pop; Easy listening
- Length: 52:30
- Label: Arista
- Producer: Barry Manilow; Phil Ramone

Barry Manilow chronology
| Greatest Hits: The Platinum Collection (1994) | Singin' with the Big Bands (1994) | Summer of '78 (1996) |

Professional ratings
Review scores
| Source | Rating |
|---|---|
| AllMusic | 2/5 stars |
| Robert Christgau | C |
| Entertainment Weekly | C+ |
| Select | 1/5 medals |

Singin' with the Big Bands is an album by Barry Manilow, released in 1994. The album was Manilow's first to reach gold since Because It's Christmas (1990).

== Track listing ==
1. "Singin' With The Big Bands" (Barry Manilow, Bruce Sussman) - 2:28
2. "Sentimental Journey" — Featuring Les Brown and his Band of Renown (Bud Green, Les Brown, Ben Homer) - 3:19
3. "And the Angels Sing" (Johnny Mercer, Ziggy Elman) - 3:04
4. "Green Eyes" — Featuring The Jimmy Dorsey Orchestra with Rosemary Clooney (Eddie Rivera, Eddie Woods, Nilo Menendez) - 3:19 (with Rosemary Clooney)
5. "I Should Care" (Sammy Cahn, Axel Stordahl, Paul Weston) - 3:02
6. "Don't Get Around Much Anymore" — Featuring The Duke Ellington Orchestra (Duke Ellington, Bob Russell) - 2:58
7. "I Can't Get Started" (Vernon Duke, Ira Gershwin) - 4:29
8. "Chattanooga Choo Choo" — Featuring The Glenn Miller Orchestra (Mack Gordon, Harry Warren) - 3:24
9. "Moonlight Serenade" (Glenn Miller, Mitchell Parish) - 4:50
10. "On the Sunny Side of the Street" — Featuring The Tommy Dorsey Orchestra (Dorothy Fields, Jimmy McHugh) - 3:26
11. "All or Nothing at All" — Featuring The Harry James Orchestra (Arthur Altman, Jack Lawrence) - 3:02
12. "I'll Never Smile Again" — Featuring The Tommy Dorsey Orchestra (Ruth Lowe) - 3:08
13. "I'm Getting Sentimental over You" (George Bassman, Ned Washington) - 3:27
14. "Don't Sit Under the Apple Tree (with Anyone Else but Me)" — Featuring The Glenn Miller Orchestra with Debra Byrd (Lew Brown, Sam H. Stept, Charles Tobias) - 2:52
15. "(I'll Be with You in) Apple Blossom Time" (Neville Fleeson, Albert Von Tilzer) - 2:31
16. "Where Does the Time Go?" (Barry Manilow, Bruce Sussman) - 3:10

== Personnel ==
- Barry Manilow – vocals
- Les Brown and his Band of Renown – instruments (2)
- The Jimmy Dorsey Orchestra – instruments (4)
- The Duke Ellington Orchestra – instruments (6)
- The Glenn Miller Orchestra – instruments (8, 14)
- The Tommy Dorsey Orchestra – instruments (10, 12)
- The Harry James Orchestra – instruments (11)
- Warren Luening – trumpet solo (3, 7)
- Charlie Young – alto sax solo (6)
- Bill Watrous – trombone solo (13)
- Artie Butler – arrangements and conductor (1, 9, 11-13, 15, 16)
- Jay Hill – arrangements (2)
- Les Brown – original arrangements (2)
- Dick Hyman – arrangements and conductor (3, 7)
- Benny Goodman – original arrangements (3)
- Mike Melvoin – arrangements and conductor (4-6)
- Jimmy Dorsey – original arrangements (4)
- Duke Ellington – original arrangements (6)
- Bunny Berigan – original arrangements (7)
- Glenn Miller – original arrangements (9)
- Sy Oliver – arrangements (10)
- Harry James – original arrangements (11)
- Tommy Dorsey – original arrangements (12)
- Jim Miller – orchestra leader (4)
- Mercer Ellington – orchestra leader (6)
- Larry O'Brien – orchestra leader (8, 14)
- Buddy Morrow – orchestra leader (10, 12), trombone solo (12)
- Art Depew – orchestra leader (11)
- Rosemary Clooney – vocals (4)
- Debra Byrd – backing vocals (8, 14), vocal arrangements (8, 14), vocals (14)
- Kevin DiSimone – backing vocals (8, 14)
- Margaret Dorn – backing vocals (8, 14)
- James Jolis – backing vocals (8, 14)
- Susan Boyd – backing vocals (10, 15)
- Donna Davidson – backing vocals (10, 15)
- Jon Joyce – backing vocals (10, 15), vocal arrangements (15)
- Don Shelton – backing vocals (10, 15)

== Production ==
- Barry Manilow – producer
- Phil Ramone – producer
- Don Murray – mixing
- Allen Abrahamson – engineer
- Gary Chester – engineer
- Don Haun – engineer
- Bill Molina – engineer
- John Richards – engineer
- Bryan Carrigan – assistant engineer
- Peter Doell – assistant engineer
- Noel Hazen – assistant engineer
- Mike Kloster – assistant engineer, mix assistant
- Charlie Paakkari – assistant engineer
- Mike Piersante – assistant engineer
- Al Sanderson – assistant engineer
- Brian Soucy – assistant engineer
- Yvonne Yedibalian – assistant engineer
- Larry Walsh – digital editing
- Wally Traugott – mastering
- Roland Baker – project coordinator
- Jill Dell'Abate – project coordinator
- Susanne Marie Edgren – project coordinator
- Marc Hulett – project coordinator, personal assistant
- Chie Masumoto – project coordinator
- Susan Mendola – art direction
- Timothy White – photography
- William Rohlfing – set design
- Amy Finkle – art coordinator
- Wayne Scott Lukas – stylist
- Joe Simon – grooming
- Stiletto Entertainment – management

== Charts ==
=== Weekly charts ===
| Chart (1994) | Peak position |
|---|---|
| UK Albums (OCC) | 54 |
| US Billboard 200 | 59 |

=== Year-end charts ===
| Chart (1995) | Position |
|---|---|
| US Billboard 200 | 198 |
