= Manilow Sings Sinatra =

Studio album by Barry Manilow
- Released: November 10, 1998
- Recorded: 1998
- Studio: Capitol Studios (Hollywood, California); Sublime Music (West Hollywood, California)
- Genre: Pop; easy listening
- Length: 38:55
- Label: Arista
- Producer: Barry Manilow; Phil Ramone; Johnny Mandel

Barry Manilow chronology
Summer of '78 (1996)	Manilow Sings Sinatra (1998)	Here at the Mayflower (2001)

Professional ratings
Review scores
Source	Rating
Allmusic	3/5 stars
Entertainment Weekly	D
Los Angeles Times	2.5/4 stars
Sunday Mercury	(mixed)
Birmingham Mail	(favorable)
The Guardian	3/5 stars
Orange County Register	1.5/4 stars
Portland Press-Herald	F
Newsday	(favorable)
The Windsor Star	4/5 stars
The Ottawa Citizen	2/5 stars
The Toronto Star	(mixed)
Richmond Times-Dispatch	(favorable)
USA Today	(unfavorable)
Dayton Daily News	D+
Tulsa World	(unfavorable)
San Francisco Examiner	2/5 stars
The Morning Call	(unfavorable)
The Baltimore Sun	2.5/4 stars
The Springfield News-Leader	2.5/4 stars

Manilow Sings Sinatra is an album by singer-songwriter Barry Manilow, released in 1998. It is a compilation of Manilow singing songs originally made notable by Frank Sinatra, who had recently died. The album also featured two new compositions, intended as tributes to Sinatra.

At the 42nd Grammy Awards, the album was nominated for Best Traditional Pop Vocal Album, with the award that year going to Tony Bennett for Bennett Sings Ellington: Hot & Cool.

== Track listing ==
1. "One Man in a Spotlight" (Barry Manilow, Bruce Sussman) (arr. by Manilow) - 0:57
2. "I've Got the World on a String" (Harold Arlen, Ted Koehler) (originally arr. by Nelson Riddle; arr. by Manilow) - 2:13
3. "The Second Time Around" (Sammy Cahn, Jimmy Van Heusen) (originally arr. by Riddle; arr. by Manilow) - 3:34
4. "Come Dance with Me" / "Come Fly with Me" (Cahn, Van Heusen/Cahn, Van Heusen) (originally arr. by Billy May; arr. by Manilow) - 2:59
5. "All the Way" (Cahn, Van Heusen) (originally arr. by Riddle; arr. by Manilow) - 3:43
6. "You Make Me Feel So Young" (Josef Myrow, Mack Gordon) (originally arr. by Riddle; arr. by Manilow) - 2:59
7. "Strangers in the Night" (Bert Kaempfert, Charles Singleton, Eddie Snyder) (originally arr. by Ernie Freeman; arr. by Manilow) - 3:08
8. "In the Wee Small Hours of the Morning" (Bob Hilliard, David Mann) (originally arr. by Riddle; arr. by Manilow) - 3:34
9. "Summer Wind" (Heinz Meyer, Hans Bradtke, Johnny Mercer) (originally arr. by Riddle; arr. by Manilow) - 2:46
10. "Saturday Night (Is the Loneliest Night of the Week)" (Cahn, Jule Styne) (originally arr. by ; arr. by Manilow) - 2:12
11. "Angel Eyes" (Matt Dennis, Earl Brent) (originally arr. by ; arr. by Manilow) - 4:09
12. "My Kind of Town" (Cahn, Van Heusen) (originally arr. by ; arr. by Manilow) - 3:00
13. "Put Your Dreams Away (For Another Day)" (Ruth Lowe, Paul Mann, Stephan Weiss) (originally arr. by ; arr. by Manilow) - 1:41
14. "Here's to the Man" (Manilow, Sussman) (arr. by Manilow) - 2:01

== Personnel ==
Musicians

- Barry Manilow – vocals, vocal arrangements (4, 6, 12)
- Michael Lang – synthesizers
- Mike Melvoin – acoustic piano (2, 5, 8, 9, 13)
- Pete Jolly – acoustic piano (3)
- Tom Ranier – acoustic piano (4, 6, 7, 10, 11)
- Douglas Besterman – additional keyboards (7), rhythm sequencing (7)
- Michael Skloff – additional keyboards (7), rhythm sequencing (7)
- PierGiorgio Bertucelli – additional keyboards (7), rhythm sequencing (7)
- John Chiodini – guitar (2, 5, 8, 9, 13)
- Dennis Budimir – guitar (3)
- James Harrah – electric guitar (4, 7, 10)
- John Pisano – guitar (4, 7, 10)
- Jim Fox – guitar (6, 11, 12)
- Paul Viapiano – guitar (6, 11, 12)
- Dean Parks – guitar (7, 9)
- Chuck Domanico – bass guitar (2, 5, 6, 8–13)
- Ray Brown – bass guitar (3)
- Chuck Berghofer – bass guitar (4, 7)
- John Peña – electric bass (7)
- Jeff Hamilton – drums (2, 5, 8, 9, 13)
- Albie Berk – drums (3)
- Gregg Field – drums (4, 6, 7, 10–12)

Orchestra

- Patrick Williams – arrangements and conductor (1, 4, 14)
- Johnny Mandel – arrangements (2, 5, 8, 9, 13), conductor (2)
- Artie Butler – arrangements and conductor (3, 10)
- Eddie Karam – conductor (5, 8, 9, 13)
- Don Sebesky – arrangements and conductor (6, 11, 12)
- Douglas Besterman – arrangements and conductor (7)
- Frank Capp, Jules Chaikin and Joe Soldo – contractors
- Assa Drori, Clayton Haslop and Ralph Morrison – concertmasters

Brass and Reed section

- Lee Callet, Pete Christlieb, Gene Cipriano, Jeff Clayton, Louise Di Tullio, Bob Efford, Terry Harrington, Dan Higgins, Greg Huckins, Steve Kujala, Sal Lozano, Lanny Morgan, Jack Nimitz, Don Shelton and Gary Woodward – reeds
- Bill Elton, Alan Kaplan, Charles Loper, Andy Martin, Bob McChesney, Dick Nash, Phil Teale, Don Waldrop and Chauncey Welsch – trombone
- Frank Baptist, Wayne Bergeron, Conte Candoli, George Graham, Larry Hall, Steve Huffsteter, Warren Luening, Larry McGuire, Carl Saunders and Frank Szabo – trumpet
- Jim Atkinson, Nathan Campbell, Marni Johnson, Daniel P. Kelley, Brad Kintscher, Paul Klintworth, John Lorge, John Mason, Paul Stevens, Richard Todd, Brad Warnaar and Gregory Williams – French horn

String section

- Robert Adcock, Jodi Burnett, Antony Cooke, Larry Corbett, Ernie Ehrhardt, Christine Ermacoff, Stefanie Fife, Rowena Hammill, Anne Karam, Suzie Katayama, Ray Kelley, Earl Madison, Daniel Rothmuller, David Speltz, Nancy Stein-Ross and Sebastian Toettcher – cello
- Tim Barr, John Clayton, Constance Deeter, Steve LaFever, Norman Ludwin, John Peña, David Young and Frances Liu Wu – double bass
- Julie Berghofer and Gayle Levant – harp
- Marylin Baker, Denyse Buffum, Rollice Dale, Brian Dembow, Jerry Epstein, Suzanne Giordano, Pamela Goldsmith, Mimi Granat, Keith Green, Peter Hatch, Renita Koven, Margot MacLaine, Carole Mukogawa, Andrew Picken, Jimbo Ross, Jody Rubin, John Scanlon, Julia Staudhammer and Evan Wilson – viola
- Patrick Aiken, Tamsen Beseke, Eve Butler, Andrea Byers, Darius Campo, Russ Cantor, Mark Cargill, Ron Clark, Joel Derouin, Yvette Devereaux, Maurice Dicterow, Alan Ellsworth, Kirsten Fife, Ronald Folsom, Galina Golovin, Rhonni Hallman, Gwenn Heller, Pat Johnson, Karen Jones, Igor Kiskatchi, Miran Kojian, Sarah Knutson, Brian Leonard, Dennis Molchan, Jennifer Munday, Donald Palmer, Linda Rose, Anatoly Rosinsky, Rebecca Rutkowski, Bob Sanov, Marc Sazer, Kwihee Shamban, Haim Shtrum, James Stark, David Stenske, Jacqueline Suzuki, Kimiyo Takeya, Olivia Tsui, Mari Tsumura, Elizabeth Wilson, North Wood and Shari Zippert – violin

Percussion

- Larry Bunker and Dan Greco

== Production ==
- Barry Manilow – producer
- Phil Ramone – producer
- Johnny Mandel – co-producer (2, 5, 8, 9, 13)
- Don Murray – recording, mastering, mixing (1, 3, 4, 6, 7, 10–12, 14)
- Al Schmitt – mixing (2, 5, 8, 9, 13)
- Eric Cowden – assistant engineer
- Peter Doell – assistant engineer
- Will Donovan – assistant engineer
- Stephen Genewick – assistant engineer
- Charlie Paakkari – assistant engineer
- Robert Vosgien – digital editing, mastering
- Ron McMaster – additional digital editing
- Ivy Skoff – production coordinator
- Marc Hulett – personal assistant
- Sherri G. Lee – art direction
- Lance Staedler – photography (front & back, inside & outside tray, first inside spread)
- Carl Studna – all other interior photography
- Garth Condit – styling
- Michele Garziano – grooming
- Garry C. Kiel – management
