= If I Should Love Again =

Studio album by Barry Manilow
- Released: September 1981
- Recorded: 1980–1981
- Studio: United Western Recorders (Hollywood, California)
- Genre: Pop
- Length: 42:42
- Label: Arista
- Producers: Barry Manilow; Michael DeLugg (associate producer)

Barry Manilow chronology
Barry (1980)	If I Should Love Again (1981)	Barry Live in Britain (1982)

If I Should Love Again is the eighth studio album released by singer and songwriter Barry Manilow. The album was recorded at United Western Recording Studios in Los Angeles, California. The album was released in 1981, and it was certified gold.

Manilow refers to it as "The most romantic album that I ever made", and remarks "I was so caught up in romance that I actually wrote music and lyrics to the title song while playing the piano facing the ocean, in a rented house on the beach in Atlantic City, New Jersey."

== Reception ==
Professional ratings
Review scores
Source	Rating
AllMusic	3/5 stars
The Rolling Stone Album Guide	1/5 stars

Bryan Buss of AllMusic retrospectively called the album "classic Barry Manilow; shamelessly well-crafted adult contemporary." He concluded his review by saying "It may not be the biggest album of his career, but If I Should Love Again showcases Manilow's greatest skill: making heartbreak sound hopeful."

== Track listing ==
=== Side 1 ===
1. "The Old Songs" (David Pomeranz, Buddy Kaye) - 4:43
2. "Let's Hang On" (Bob Crewe, Denny Randell, Sandy Linzer) - 3:12
3. "If I Should Love Again" (Barry Manilow) - 5:33
4. "Don't Fall in Love with Me" (Barry Manilow, John Bettis) - 3:39
5. "Break Down the Door" (Barry Manilow, Bob Gaudio, Enoch Anderson) - 3:04

=== Side 2 ===
1. "Somewhere Down the Road" (Cynthia Weil, Tom Snow) - 4:00
2. "No Other Love" (Barry Manilow, Adrienne Anderson) - 4:36
3. "Fools Get Lucky" (Barry Manilow, John Bettis) - 4:11
4. "I Haven't Changed the Room" (Barry Manilow) - 2:16
5. "Let's Take All Night (to Say Goodbye)" (Barry Manilow, John Bettis) - 3:36

=== 1998 CD bonus track ===
1. "You're Runnin' Too Hard" (Barry Manilow, Marty Panzer) - 3:00

=== Cover versions on If I Should Love Again ===
- In 2007, Filipina pop/R&B singer Nina recorded the title track for the re-release of her self-titled album entitled Nina Featuring the Hits of Barry Manilow and released as the album's second single. It peaked at No. 2 on the Philippine charts.
- In 2021, Filipina singer and actress Maris Racal recorded the title track for the album Stop Missing You.

== Charts ==
Chart (1981/82)	Position
United States (Billboard 200)	14
Australia (Kent Music Report)	85
United Kingdom (Official Charts Company)	5

== Personnel ==
- Barry Manilow – vocals, acoustic piano (1, 3–10), rhythm track arrangements (1, 3, 6–8, 10), backing vocals (2), arrangements (2, 4, 5), orchestrations (4)
- Robert Marullo – synthesizers (1, 2, 4, 6), Fender Rhodes (3, 10), keyboards (5)
- Victor Vanacore – keyboards (1, 6), acoustic piano (2), arrangements (2, 4), horn and string orchestrations (3, 10), orchestrations (4)
- Bill Mays – keyboards (2, 4, 5, 7)
- John Pondel – guitars (1, 3, 5, 6, 10)
- Paul Jackson Jr. – guitars (2)
- Dean Parks – guitars (2, 4, 5, 7, 8, 10)
- Mitch Holder – guitars (4, 5, 8)
- Carl Sealove – bass (1, 3, 5, 6, 10)
- Will Lee – bass (2, 4, 5, 7, 8)
- Bud Harner – drums (1, 3, 5, 6, 10)
- Ed Greene – drums (2, 4, 5, 7)
- Robert Forte – percussion (1, 3, 6, 10)
- Alan Estes – percussion (4, 5, 7, 8)
- Bill Page – French horn (3), flute (10)
- Tom Scott – sax solo (4), saxophone (5)
- Artie Butler – horn and string orchestrations (1, 6)
- Jimmie Haskell – horn and string orchestrations (7, 8)
- Shaun Harris – contractor
- Sid Sharp – concertmaster
- Bill Champlin – backing vocals (1, 3, 5–8, 10)
- Tom Kelly – backing vocals (1, 3, 5–8, 10)
- Richard Page – backing vocals (1, 3, 5–8, 10)

=== Production ===
- Barry Manilow – producer
- Michael DeLugg – associate producer, engineer
- Gary Boatner – assistant engineer
- Ira Seigel – assistant engineer
- Ken Perry – mastering at Capitol Mastering (Hollywood, California)
- Roger Wall – personal assistant
- Donn Davenport – art direction
- Neal Pozner – design
- Linda Fennimore – illustration

== Certifications ==
Region	Certification	Certified units/sales
United Kingdom (BPI)	Platinum	300,000^{^}
United States (RIAA)	Gold	500,000^{^}
^{^} Shipments figures based on certification alone.
