= Rob Shuter =

British journalist (born 1973)

- Born: Robert James Shuter; 16 July 1973 (age 53); Birmingham, England
- Occupations: Talk show host Gossip columnist Media personality
- Spouse: Bruce Sussman (m. 2011)

Robert James Shuter (born July 16, 1973) is a British-American journalist, gossip columnist, magazine editor, talk show host, and author. He does celebrity journalism, particularly reporting on entertainment news and public figures.

In 2007, Shuter became the executive editor of the American edition of OK! magazine. During his tenure, the magazine achieved its first million selling issue and secured several high-profile exclusives, including an interview with Britney Spears during a period when she had personal and professional challenges.

== Career ==
=== Public relations ===
Shuter worked at Dan Klores Communications, where he represented a range of high-profile clients, including Jennifer Lopez, Jessica Simpson, Alicia Keys, Sean "Diddy" Combs, Jon Bon Jovi, Naomi Campbell, and Paris Hilton.

=== Magazine Editing ===
After representing Us Weekly, Shuter joined OK! magazine at the suggestion of its owner, Richard Desmond. During his tenure as editor, the magazine published several high-profile exclusives, including the reunion of Anna Nicole Smith's daughter Dannielynn's Larry Birkhead, Eva Longoria's wedding, and baby photos of Matthew McConaughey, Jessica Alba, and Sheryl Crow.

=== Television – Naughty But Nice With Rob ===
Shuter hosted the half-hour talk show Naughty But Nice with Rob, produced by Mark Cuban's HDNet. The pilot episode featured celebrity guests including Molly Sims, Teresa Giudice from The Real Housewives of New Jersey, and Michael Lohan. The show premiered on 6 November 2010.

== Personal life ==
Shuter married Grammy Award winning songwriter Bruce Sussman on October 29, 2011.
