= Foul Play (1978 film) =

1978 comedy thriller film by Colin Higgins

- Theatrical release poster
- Directed by: Colin Higgins
- Written by: Colin Higgins
- Produced by: Edward K. Milkis; Thomas L. Miller
- Starring: Goldie Hawn; Chevy Chase; Burgess Meredith; Brian Dennehy; Dudley Moore
- Cinematography: David M. Walsh
- Edited by: Pembroke J. Herring
- Music by: Charles Fox
- Distributed by: Paramount Pictures
- Release date: July 14, 1978
- Running time: 116 minutes
- Country: United States
- Language: English
- Budget: $5 million
- Box office: $45 million

Foul Play is a 1978 American romantic neo-noir comedy thriller film written and directed by Colin Higgins, and starring Goldie Hawn, Chevy Chase, Dudley Moore, Burgess Meredith, Eugene Roche, Rachel Roberts, Brian Dennehy and Billy Barty. The plot concerns a recently divorced librarian who is drawn into a mystery when a stranger hides a roll of film in a pack of cigarettes and gives it to her for safekeeping.

The film received seven Golden Globe Award nominations, including Best Motion Picture – Musical or Comedy, Best Actress – Motion Picture Musical or Comedy (Hawn), Best Actor – Motion Picture Musical or Comedy (Chase) and Best Supporting Actor in a Motion Picture (Moore), as well as for the Academy Award for Best Original Song, but won none.

The film inspired a television series of the same name starring Barry Bostwick and Deborah Raffin that aired on the ABC network in early 1981, and was canceled after six episodes.

== Plot ==
A Catholic archbishop opens his cupboard and sees the reflection of a similar looking man staring back at him. He turns around and is killed by a knife thrown into his chest.

Gloria Mundy, a recently divorced San Francisco librarian encounters Lieutenant Tony Carlson, a young police officer, at a party, who stumbles and spills a bunch of drinks. Driving home, she stops for a man named Bob "Scotty" Scott and joins him at the Nuart Theatre. Before they part company, he asks her to take his pack of cigarettes to help him curb his smoking. Scotty has secreted a roll of undeveloped film in the cigarette pack. That evening, a wounded Scotty meets Gloria again. He asks her about the film, warns her to "beware of the dwarf", and dies. Gloria seeks help from the theater manager, but Scotty's body has disappeared and she can't convince anyone of what has transpired.

The next day albino Whitey Jackson attacks Gloria in her library with ether. She runs to hide in a singles bar and stranger Stanley Tibbets takes her to his home. The British womanizer assumes she wants to have sex, mixes a cocktail laced with Spanish fly and dances while removing his clothes. Gloria flees to her apartment and is attacked by a man with a scar who demands the cigarette pack. When he attempts to strangle her, Gloria stabs him with knitting needles and calls the police. The attacker persists and is killed by a knife thrown by Whitey through the kitchen window. Gloria faints in shock and awakens to find all traces of the incident gone. She can't convince Tony, his partner Inspector "Fergie" Ferguson, or even her landlord Mr. Hennessy that she was attacked.

Turk Farnum, the chauffeur of a limousine in which Gloria had seen Whitey riding, abducts her, but she subdues him with mace and brass knuckles given to her by her coworker Stella. Tony discovers that Scotty, an undercover SFPD inspector investigating a tip about an assassination plot, was investigating contract killer Rupert Stiltskin (alias "the Dwarf"). Tony is assigned to protect Gloria and takes her to his houseboat.

Tony and Fergie discover that the limousine is registered to the archdiocese of San Francisco. They visit Archbishop Thorncrest, unaware he's actually the archbishop's twin brother Charlie and is involved in a plot to assassinate Pope Pius XIII during a visit to San Francisco. Charlie has murdered the real archbishop to impersonate him. Rupert kidnaps Fergie and uses him to lure Gloria into a trap. She hides in a massage parlor and encounters Stanley yet again, but Whitey and Stiltskin then find and abduct her.

Stella researches the Tax the Churches League, a radical fringe group founded by anti-religious zealots Delia Darrow and her husband. Tony and Mr. Hennessy sneak into the archbishop's wine cellar and discover the imprisoned Fergie, who tells him that the Darrows hired Stiltskin to assassinate the Pope during a performance of The Mikado at the San Francisco Opera House that evening. Rupert attacks Tony, who kills him in self-defense. However, the fake archbishop's assistant Gerda Caswell, who is really Delia, holds Tony and Gloria at gunpoint. Darrow details her contingency plan, that if the pope isn't dead by the end of act I, if he leaves his seat, or if the police arrive, Whitey will open fire from one of the auditorium's two organ bays. Hennessy knocks Charlie out and defeats Delia in a martial arts duel, allowing Tony and Gloria to drive to the opera house. Gloria and Whitey grapple backstage and Tony shoots Whitey dead. As the performance ends, Gloria and Tony are revealed kissing, onstage, along with the bodies of Whitey and a security guard, but the pope has not noticed anything unusual and leads the audience in applause for the performance.

== Cast ==
- Goldie Hawn as Gloria Mundy
- Chevy Chase as Lieutenant Tony Carlson
- Burgess Meredith as Mr. Hennessey
- Brian Dennehy as Inspector "Fergie" Ferguson
- Dudley Moore as Stanley Tibbets
- Rachel Roberts as Gerda Casswell / Delia Darrow
- Eugene Roche as Archbishop Thorncrest / Charlie Thorncrest
- William Frankfather as "Whitey" Jackson
- Marc Lawrence as Rupert Stiltskin, "The Dwarf"
- Marilyn Sokol as Stella
- Billy Barty as J.J. MacKuen
- Bruce Solomon as Bob "Scotty" Scott
- Don Calfa as "Scarface"
- Cyril Magnin as Pope Pius XIII
- Chuck McCann as Nuart Theatre Manager
- Thomas Jamerson as "Pish-Tush"
- Frances Bay as Mrs. Russel
- Jophery Brown as Cop

== Production ==
Foul Play is an homage to director Alfred Hitchcock, several of whose films are referenced during the film. The premise of an innocent person becoming entangled in a web of intrigue is common in Hitchcock films, such as The 39 Steps, Saboteur, North by Northwest and, most notably, The Man Who Knew Too Much, which inspired the opera house sequence in Foul Play. When Gloria is attacked in her home by a man attempting to strangle her with a scarf and she defends herself with a household object, both are references to Dial M for Murder. Other Hitchcock films which receive a nod from screenwriter/director Colin Higgins include Notorious, Vertigo, and Psycho. In addition, the plot includes a MacGuffin—an object that initially is the central focus of the film but declines in importance until it is forgotten and unexplained by the end—in the form of the roll of film concealed in the pack of cigarettes which ends up being thrown into a fire in a fireplace. Hitchcock popularized the term MacGuffin and used the technique in many of his films.

"Audiences love to be scared and at the same time they love to laugh", said Higgins. "It is tongue in cheek realism. The audience is in on the joke but the actors must carry on as if they were unaware."

The script originally was written under the name Killing Lydia with Goldie Hawn in mind for the lead. Higgins had met Hawn through their mutual friend Hal Ashby. However, the project did not take off. After Silver Streak came out, Higgins rewrote the script. He and the producers took the project to Paramount, which hoped to star Farrah Fawcett. However, Fawcett was in the middle of a legal battle with the producers of Charlie's Angels so it was decided to go with Hawn.

The name Gloria Mundy is a reference to "Sic transit gloria mundi", Latin for "Thus passes the glory of the world": the phrase was part of the rite of papal coronation until 1963.

Higgins had written the role of Stanley Tibbets for Tim Conway, but when the actor turned it down he offered it to Dudley Moore instead. It was Moore's American film debut and led to his being cast in 10 by Blake Edwards the following year.

Higgins said when he sold the script he wanted to direct it so badly he did not care who was going to play the lead roles. He met with Fawcett to play the female lead before going with Goldie Hawn. His first choice for the male lead was Harrison Ford (who had been Higgins' carpenter), who turned it down. Steve Martin was offered the role but did not end up playing it. Higgins says he offered the part to another actor who wanted to play the cop and Stanley Tibbets. Eventually Chevy Chase was cast.

The film was shot in and around San Francisco, in locations including Noe Valley, the Mission District, Hallidie Plaza, Telegraph Hill, Hayes Valley, Nob Hill, Pacific Heights, Fort Mason, the Marina District, the Presidio, Potrero Hill, Japantown, and the War Memorial Opera House. The lobby scenes of the opera house were filmed in the rotunda of San Francisco City Hall across the street. The Nuart Theatre, in which Bob Scott dies early in the film, is an art house located on Santa Monica Boulevard in West Los Angeles. The houseboat "Galatea" was located at 15 Yellow Ferry Dock in Sausalito.

== Novelization ==
A novelization, by James Cass Rogers, based upon the screenplay by Colin Higgins, was published by Jove Books in conjunction with the release of the film in 1978.

== Music ==
"Ready to Take a Chance Again", the film's theme song, was composed by Charles Fox, with lyrics by Fox's writing partner Norman Gimbel and performed by Barry Manilow, who conceived and supervised the song's recording in partnership with Ron Dante. The soundtrack also includes "Copacabana" written by Manilow, Bruce Sussman and Jack Feldman, and performed by Manilow; "I Feel the Earth Move" by Carole King, and "Stayin' Alive", written and performed by the Bee Gees. Excerpts from Act I of Gilbert & Sullivan's The Mikado, conducted by Julius Rudel, are performed by members of the New York City Opera. Arista Records issued the album on LP and cassette, with Intrada Records reissuing it on compact disc in 2009. Varèse Sarabande released it in 2016, with Charles Fox's theme for the television series as a bonus track.

== Critical reception ==
Janet Maslin of The New York Times called the film "a slick, attractive, enjoyable movie with all the earmarks of a hit. But as House Calls did a few months ago, it starts out promising genuine wit and originality only to fall back on more familiar tactics after a half-hour or so. If either film had a less winning opening, perhaps it wouldn't leave a vague aftertaste of disappointment. Colin Higgins...has aimed for the same kind of thriller-comedy-romance hybrid he attempted in writing Silver Streak, and this time he's much more successful ...Still, Mr. Higgins isn't a facile enough juggler to keep the film's diverse elements from colliding at times."

Arthur D. Murphy of Variety called it "an excellent film", adding "Writer Colin Higgins makes a good directorial bow. Goldie Hawn is superb in a strong return to pictures, and Chevy Chase, also above title, works well as a screen partner."

Gene Siskel of the Chicago Tribune gave the film 3 stars out of 4 and called it "an attractive minor comedy, the kind of film best described as 'cute.'" On a 1986 Tonight Show appearance, Roger Ebert called the film "a very good picture."

Charles Champlin of the Los Angeles Times remarked that "Foul Play does offer a kind of duplex pleasure—as a celebration of the movies the way they used to make them, sleek, funny, exciting but unworrying, and in its own terms as a vividly adventurous romantic comedy."

Gary Arnold of The Washington Post wrote "Foul Play never begins to make sense as a mystery story, and it's not incidentally amusing or stylish. At best, the film can be accepted as a harmless assortment of fake-outs and distractions, alternating in tone from innocuous to vicious, from disarming to offensive."

Time Out London stated "Unsatisfactory as a whole, the film is hilarious and tense in bits" and noted "while writer/director Higgins uses almost every stock thriller device...he approaches this semi-parody with more zest and originality than is common."

Channel 4 called the film "a finely tuned and fast-paced offering which is chock-full of black comic twists and perfect casting."

On review aggregator Rotten Tomatoes, the film holds a 74% approval rating based on 31 reviews. The consensus summarizes: "Entertaining and charming like its charismatic leads, Foul Play is a rollicking homage to the master of suspense for those who prefer mysteries with gags on top." Metacritic, which uses a weighted average, assigned the film a score of 45 out of 100, based on seven critics, indicating "mixed or average" reviews.

== Awards and nominations ==
Year	Award	Category	Nominee(s)	Result	Ref.
1978	Academy Awards	Best Original Song	"Ready to Take a Chance Again"; Music by Charles Fox; Lyrics by Norman Gimbel	Nominated	
1978	Edgar Allan Poe Awards	Best Motion Picture	Colin Higgins	Nominated	
1978	Golden Globe Awards	Best Motion Picture – Musical or Comedy		Nominated	
1978	Golden Globe Awards	Best Actor in a Motion Picture – Musical or Comedy	Chevy Chase	Nominated	
1978	Golden Globe Awards	Best Actress in a Motion Picture – Musical or Comedy	Goldie Hawn	Nominated	
1978	Golden Globe Awards	Best Supporting Actor – Motion Picture	Dudley Moore	Nominated	
1978	Golden Globe Awards	Best Screenplay – Motion Picture	Colin Higgins	Nominated	
1978	Golden Globe Awards	Best Original Song – Motion Picture	"Ready to Take a Chance Again"; Music by Charles Fox; Lyrics by Norman Gimbel	Nominated	
1978	Golden Globe Awards	Best Motion Picture Acting Debut – Male	Chevy Chase	Nominated	
