= Nuart Theatre =

Movie theatre in Los Angeles, California, USA

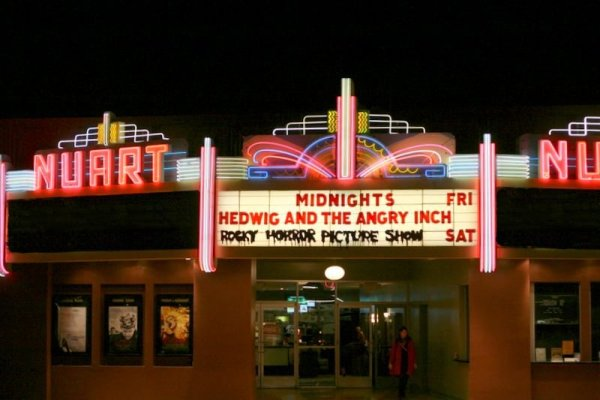
- Exterior view of the Nuart Theatre
- Interactive map of Nuart Theatre
- Address: 11272 Santa Monica Boulevard; Los Angeles, California 90025; United States
- Coordinates: 34.04645°N 118.448°W
- Owner: Landmark Theatres
- Capacity: 303
- Type: Cinema

Construction
- Opened: 1929

Website
- www.landmarktheatres.com

The Nuart Theatre is an art-house movie-theater in Los Angeles, California, United States. It is the flagship location of the Landmark Theatres chain in the United States.

== Location ==
The Nuart is on Santa Monica Boulevard, one block from the 405 Freeway.

== History ==
The Nuart was built in 1929. The Nuart was bought by Landmark Theatres in 1974 and was the first Landmark theater, soon joined by others including the UC Theater in Berkeley. The theater was remodelled in 2006 and currently seats 303 people.

In February 2024, the Nuart celebrated its 50th anniversary.

== Programming ==
The Nuart is a single-screen theater known for its "eclectic" mix of arthouse, independent, and foreign film programming. It has debuted or shown many films that were less successful in their original runs but later became hailed as cult classics. It also has screened The Rocky Horror Picture Show every Saturday night with a live shadowcast since the 1980s.

== In popular culture ==
Filmmaker David Lynch, accompanied by his "boys" (five Woody Woodpecker dolls), thanking the Nuart and its patrons in a 1982 introduction that played before Nuart reissue screenings of Eraserhead

The theater was used in the Chevy Chase–Goldie Hawn comedy film Foul Play, although the film is set in San Francisco.

John Waters took the spotlight in a "No Smoking" theatrical trailer, initially showcased at the Nuart Theatre, in which he humorously advised patrons to 'smoke anyway'. Additionally, Waters featured in a Nuart-specific trailer expressing gratitude to the theater for its longstanding showcase of Pink Flamingos and its role in elevating DIVINE to the status of a 'Filth Goddess'. Waters continued his cinematic presence in a theatrical trailer dedicated to the Shock Value film festival. These distinctive trailers, directed by Douglas Brian Martin and produced by Douglas Brian Martin and Steven M. Martin, were not the sole cinematic additions at the Nuart. The theater showcased trailers by the Martin brothers, featuring luminaries such as David Lynch and Peter Ivers.

The Nuart was the location for the theatrical world premiere of Beyond the Valley of the Ultra Vixens directed by Russ Meyer. Edith Massey of "Pink Flamingos" fame performed on a makeshift stage with her punk rock band The "Incredible Edible Eggs" featuring Regina 'Gina' Schock on drums. Ms. Schock subsequently became a member of the all-girl rock band The Go-Go's. Director Michel Gondry filmed part of Beck's video for "Deadweight" at the Nuart. The Nuart is mentioned in Cannibal Women in the Avocado Jungle of Death.
