= Barry (album) =

Studio album by Barry Manilow
- Released: November 19, 1980
- Studios: Evergreen Studios (Burbank, California); Wally Heider and A&M Studios (Hollywood, California); Dirk Dalton Studios (Los Angeles, California); Mediasound (New York City, New York); Criteria Studios (Miami, Florida)
- Genre: Pop
- Length: 41:47
- Label: Arista
- Producers: Barry Manilow; Ron Dante

Barry Manilow chronology
One Voice (1979)	Barry (1980)	If I Should Love Again (1981)

Barry is the seventh studio album released by American singer and songwriter Barry Manilow in 1980 on Arista Records. The album was certified Platinum in the US by the RIAA.

== Synopsis ==
The tracks were recorded at Evergreen Recording Studios in Burbank, California. Manilow co-wrote with Maurice White of Earth, Wind & Fire the album track "Only in Chicago". "We Still Have Time" was taken from the film Tribute.

The album scored one top ten pop hit, "I Made It Through the Rain", which reached number ten, in early 1981. Although "I Made It Through the Rain" was his only Top-10 on the Hot 100 from this album, he managed to reach the Top-10 on the Adult-Contemporary lists with "Lonely Together" and the bouncy up-tempo "Bermuda Triangle" was a Top-20 hit in the UK in mid-1981. The album has yet to be released on CD in the US, but has had a CD release in Japan. It is however available as a digital download.

== Critical reception ==
Professional ratings
Review scores
Source	Rating
AllMusic	3/5 stars
The Rolling Stone Album Guide	1.5/5 stars

Joe Viglione of AllMusic, in a 3 out of 5 star retrospective review, called the album "an interesting piece of the Manilow collection, the singer covering Kenny Nolan, co-writing with Maurice White, penning a song for another film -- "We Still Have Time" from the motion picture Tribute—and including a campy duet with Lily Tomlin." Stephen Holden of The New York Times wrote that "Barry, Mr. Manilow's newest album, isn't as lively as some of his earlier work, but it's pleasant enough. Mr. Manilow's forte remains the mini-aria arranged like an elaborate jingle."

== Track listing ==
=== Side 1 ===
1. "Lonely Together" (Kenny Nolan) - 4:19
2. "Bermuda Triangle" (music: Barry Manilow; lyrics: Bruce Sussman, Jack Feldman) - 3:45
3. "I Made It Through the Rain" (music: Gerard Kenny; lyrics: Jack Feldman, Drey Shepperd, Bruce Sussman, Barry Manilow) - 4:25
4. "Twenty Four Hours a Day" (music: Barry Manilow; lyrics: Marty Panzer) - 3:25
5. "Dance Away" (Troy Seals, Richard Kerr) - 3:56

=== Side 2 ===
1. "Life Will Go On" (music: Richard Kerr; lyrics: John Bettis) - 3:50
2. "Only in Chicago" (music: Barry Manilow, Maurice White; lyrics: Barry Manilow) - 3:33
3. "The Last Duet" (with Lily Tomlin) (music: Barry Manilow; lyrics: Bruce Sussman, Jack Feldman) - 3:59
4. "London" (music: Barry Manilow; lyrics: Bruce Sussman, Jack Feldman) - 5:18
5. "We Still Have Time (Theme from the motion picture Tribute)" (music: Barry Manilow; lyrics: Bruce Sussman, Jack Feldman) - 4:12

== Personnel ==
- Barry Manilow – vocals, acoustic piano, rhythm track arrangements (1–3, 6, 8, 10), backing vocals (2, 7, 8), synthesizers (3), arrangements (4, 5, 7, 9), keyboards (6)
- David Wheatley – Fender Rhodes (1)
- Artie Butler – calliope (1), rhythm track arrangements (1, 6, 10), horn and string arrangements (1, 2, 6, 8, 10), Fender Rhodes (6)
- Paul Shaffer – keyboards (2), Fender Rhodes (7), tack piano (7)
- Robert Marullo – Fender Rhodes (3), synthesizers (3–5)
- Victor Vanacore – rhythm track arrangements (3), horn and string arrangements (3), keyboards (4, 6)
- Bill Mays – keyboards (5)
- Jerry Corbetta – keyboards (8)
- Michael Boddicker – synthesizers (9)
- Dennis Belfield – guitars (1), bass (5)
- Jay Dee Maness – pedal steel guitar (1)
- Jeff Mironov – guitars (2, 7, 9)
- Dean Parks – guitars (2, 10)
- John Pondel – guitars (3, 4, 6)
- Mitch Holder – guitars (5)
- Thom Rotella – guitars (5)
- Michael Landau – guitars (8)
- Fred Tackett – guitars (10)
- Will Lee – bass (2, 7, 9)
- Lou Shoch – bass (3, 4)
- Abraham Laboriel – bass (10)
- Carlos Vega – drums (1)
- Ronnie Zito – drums (2, 7, 9)
- Bud Harner – drums (3, 4, 6)
- Ed Greene – drums (5, 10)
- Ron Krasinski – drums (8)
- Alan Estes – percussion (2, 5, 6, 10)
- Jimmy Maelen – percussion (2, 7, 9)
- Robert Greenidge – steel drums (2)
- Ken Park – percussion (3, 4)
- Chuck Findley – horns (9)
- Shaun Harris – contractor
- Sid Sharp – concertmaster
- Tommy Morgan – harmonica (10)
- Kevin DiSimone – backing vocals (1, 3–5, 10)
- Jim Haas – backing vocals (1, 3–6, 8, 10)
- James Jolis – backing vocals (1, 3–5, 10)
- Jon Joyce – backing vocals (1, 3–6, 10)
- Ron Dante – backing vocals (2, 7)
- Stephanie Spruill – backing vocals (2)
- Maxine Waters – backing vocals (2)
- Robin Grean – backing vocals (3)
- Pat Henderson – backing vocals (3)
- Stan Farber – backing vocals (6)
- Lily Tomlin – vocals (8)

=== Production ===
- Barry Manilow – producer
- Ron Dante – producer (2–4, 6–10)
- Murray McFadden – engineer (1, 3–6, 10), horn and string engineer (2)
- Michael DeLugg – engineer (2, 7–9)
- Dirk Dalton – horn and string engineer (8)
- Gary Luchs – assistant engineer (1, 4–5, 10)
- Paul Brownstein – personal assistant
- Donn Davenport – art direction
- Paul Jasmin – cover photography
- Jay Thompson – back cover photography

== Charts ==
Chart (1980/81)	Position
United States (Billboard)	15
Australia (Kent Music Report)	65
United Kingdom (Official Charts Company)	5

== Certifications ==
Region	Certification	Certified units/sales
United Kingdom (BPI)	Platinum	300,000^{^}
United States (RIAA)	Platinum	1,000,000^{^}
^{^} Shipments figures based on certification alone.
