= Here Comes the Night (Barry Manilow album) =

Studio album by Barry Manilow
- Released: November 1982
- Studios: Sound City Studios (Van Nuys, California); Allen Zentz Recording (Encino, California)
- Genres: Pop, soft rock
- Length: 44:35
- Label: Arista
- Producer: Barry Manilow

Barry Manilow chronology
Barry Live in Britain (1982)	Here Comes the Night (1982)	Greatest Hits Vol. II (1983)

Professional ratings
Review scores
Source	Rating
Allmusic	2/5 stars
The Rolling Stone Album Guide	1/5 stars

Here Comes the Night is the ninth studio album by singer-songwriter Barry Manilow, released in 1982 by Arista Records. The United Kingdom release went by the title I Wanna Do It With You. It received a Gold certification from the RIAA. The album was recorded at Sound City Recording Studios in Van Nuys, California.

The album has yet to be released on CD in the US, but has had 2 CD releases in Japan: one was a 1987 incarnation that included a remix of "Oh Julie" (with added background vocals and additional instrumentation), and then in 1994, a new reissue came out in Japan that contained the original mix of "Oh Julie", as released in the US in 1982 on both EP and 45.

The album contains three charting singles in the US: "Memory" (#8 US AC, #39 US), "Some Kind of Friend" (#4 US AC, #26 US), and "Oh Julie" (#24 US AC, #38 US), which was found on the UK cassette version as a bonus track, plus the UK top ten track "I Wanna Do it with You".

== Track listing ==
=== US/UK album release ===
==== Side 1 ====
1. "I Wanna Do It with You" (Layng Martine, Jr.) - 3:43
2. "Here Comes the Night" (music: Barry Manilow; lyrics: John Bettis) - 3:50
3. "Memory" (Andrew Lloyd Webber, T. S. Eliot, Trevor Nunn) - 4:54
4. "Let's Get On with It" (music: Manilow; lyrics: Manilow, Adrienne Anderson) - 4:52
5. "Some Girls" (Nicky Chinn, Mike Chapman) - 3:04

==== Side 2 ====
1. "Some Kind of Friend" (music: Manilow; lyrics: Adrienne Anderson) - 4:02
2. "I'm Gonna Sit Right Down and Write Myself a Letter" (music: Fred E. Ahlert; lyrics: Joe Young) - 3:12
3. "Getting Over Losing You" (Martin Briley, Brock Walsh) - 4:16
4. "Heart of Steel" (music: Manilow; lyrics: John Bettis) - 2:50
5. "Stay" (James Jolis, Kevin DiSimone, Manilow) - 3:52

=== UK cassette release ===
==== Side 1 ====
1. "I Wanna Do It with You" - 3:43
2. "Here Comes the Night" - 3:50
3. "Memory" - 4:54
4. "Let's Get On with It" - 4:52
5. "Some Girls" - 3:04
6. "Oh Julie" (Shakin' Stevens) - 2:18

==== Side 2 ====
1. "Some Kind of Friend" - 4:02
2. "I'm Gonna Sit Right Down and Write Myself a Letter" - 3:12
3. "Getting Over Losing You" - 4:16
4. "Heart of Steel" - 2:50
5. "Stay" - 3:52
6. "Heaven" (Manilow, Bruce Sussman, Jack Feldman) - 3:20

=== Japanese release ===
==== Side 1 ====
1. "I Wanna Do It with You" - 3:43
2. "Here Comes the Night" - 3:50
3. "Memory" - 4:54
4. "Let's Get On with It" - 4:57
5. "Some Girls" - 3:04

==== Side 2 ====
1. "Some Kind Of Friend" - 4:02
2. "I'm Gonna Sit Right Down and Write Myself a Letter" - 3:12
3. "Getting Over Losing You" - 4:16
4. "Oh Julie" - 2:18
5. "Heart of Steel" - 2:50
6. "Stay" - 3:52

== Personnel ==
- Barry Manilow – vocals, arrangements (1, 2, 4–7, 9), acoustic piano (2, 3), rhythm track arrangements (3, 8, 10), keyboards (4), synthesizers (4, 6), backing vocals (5, 6)
- Victor Vanacore – acoustic piano (1, 5, 8, 10), orchestration and conductor (10)
- Ian Underwood – synthesizers (3)
- Bill Mays – keyboards (4), acoustic piano (9)
- Gabriel Katona – synthesizers (9)
- Robert Marulla – synthesizers (10)
- Richie Zito – guitars (1, 2, 8)
- Robben Ford – guitars (2), guitar solo (7)
- John Pondel – guitars (2)
- Art Phillips – guitars (3, 5)
- Paul Jackson Jr. – guitars (4, 6, 7, 9, 10)
- John Goux – guitars (6)
- Mitch Holder – guitars (7)
- George Doering – guitars (8)
- Leon Gaer – bass (1, 3, 5, 8)
- Dennis Belfield – bass (2, 4, 6, 7, 9, 10)
- John Ferraro – drums (1, 5, 8)
- Ed Greene – drums (2, 4, 6, 7, 9)
- Vinnie Colaiuta – drums (3)
- Bud Harner – drums (10)
- Alan Estes – percussion (1–5, 9, 10)
- Gary Herbig – saxophone (1, 9)
- Artie Butler – arrangements (1, 5), rhythm track arrangements (3, 8), orchestration and conductor (3, 8)
- Bill Champlin – backing vocals (1, 6–8)
- Steve George – backing vocals (1–5, 8, 9)
- Tom Kelly – backing vocals (1–9)
- Richard Page – backing vocals (2–7, 9)
- Kevin DiSimone – backing vocals (10)
- Pat Henderson – backing vocals (10)
- Muffy Hendrix – backing vocals (10)
- James Jolis – backing vocals (10)

=== Production ===
- Barry Manilow – producer
- Bill Drescher – engineer, production assistant
- Rick Polakow – assistant engineer
- Greg Fulginiti – mastering at Artisan Sound Recorders (North Hollywood, California)
- Eric Borenstein – production coordinator
- Shaun Harris – contractor
- Ria Lewerke-Shapiro – art direction
- George Hurrell – photography
- Roger Wall – personal assistant
- Richard Bradshaw – grooming
- Charles Mercuri – grooming
- Antonio V. – grooming

== Charts ==
=== Weekly charts ===
Chart (1982–1983)	Peak position
Australia Albums (Kent Music Report)	9
UK Albums (Official Charts)	7
US Billboard 200	32

=== Year-end charts ===
Chart (1983)	Position
US Billboard 200	91

== Certifications ==
Region	Certification	Certified units/sales
United Kingdom (BPI)	Gold	100,000^{^}
United States (RIAA)	Gold	500,000^{^}
^{^} Shipments figures based on certification alone.
