= Even Now (Barry Manilow album) =

Studio album by Barry Manilow
- Released: February 1978
- Recorded: July–November 1977
- Studios: A&M (Hollywood, California); Mediasound (New York City)
- Genres: Soft rock; pop
- Length: 41:39
- Label: Arista
- Producers: Barry Manilow; Ron Dante

Barry Manilow chronology
Barry Manilow Live (1977)	Even Now (1978)	Greatest Hits (1978)

Singles from Even Now
- 1. "Can't Smile Without You" Released: 1978; 2. "Even Now"/"I Was a Fool (To Let You Go)" Released: 1978; 3. "Copacabana (At the Copa)" Released: 1978; 4. "Somewhere in the Night" Released: July 1978

Even Now is the fifth studio album by singer-songwriter Barry Manilow. It was recorded at A&M Studios in Hollywood, California, and released in 1978. The album reached triple platinum and spun off four hit singles in 1978 and early 1979: the title song, "Can't Smile Without You", "Copacabana" and "Somewhere in the Night" (which had previously been a hit in 1976 for Helen Reddy). Even Now peaked at No. 3 on the U.S. Billboard 200 album chart on April 8, 1978.

At the 21st Annual Grammy Awards, Even Now was nominated for Album of the Year. The award, however, went to the Saturday Night Fever soundtrack. Still, Barry Manilow won a Grammy Award for Best Male Pop Vocal for "Copacabana (At the Copa)". This remains Barry Manilow's only Grammy Award despite fifteen (15) other nominations.

Professional ratings
Review scores
Source	Rating
AllMusic	4.5/5 stars
Rolling Stone	(average) link

== Track listing ==
Side one
No.	Title	Writer(s)	Length
1.	"Copacabana (At the Copa)"	Barry Manilow; Bruce Sussman; Jack Feldman	4:07
2.	"Somewhere in the Night"	Richard Kerr; Will Jennings	3:26
3.	"A Linda Song"	Manilow; Enoch Anderson	3:20
4.	"Can't Smile Without You"	Chris Arnold; David Martin; Geoff Morrow	3:13
5.	"Leavin' in the Morning"	Manilow; Marty Panzer	3:25
6.	"Where Do I Go from Here"	Parker McGee	3:07
Total length:			20:38

Side two
No.	Title	Writer(s)	Length
1.	"Even Now"	Manilow; Panzer	3:28
2.	"I Was a Fool (To Let You Go)"	Manilow; Panzer	3:29
3.	"Losing Touch"	Feldman; Manilow; Sussman	2:40
4.	"I Just Want to Be the One in Your Life"	Michael Price; Dan Walsh	3:39
5.	"Starting Again"	Manilow; Panzer	2:40
6.	"Sunrise"	Manilow; Adrienne Anderson	3:16
Total length:			19:12

In Latin American editions, the LP and cassette releases featured a seven-track side two, appending a Spanish-language version of "Copacabana (At the Copa)".

CD bonus tracks
No.	Title	Writer(s)	Length
1.	"I'm Comin' Home Again" (Unfinished track; 2006 remaster bonus track)	Bruce Roberts; Carole Bayer Sager	3:44
2.	"No Love for Jenny" (1996 and 2006 remaster bonus track)	Manilow; A. Anderson	2:46

== Personnel ==
- Barry Manilow – vocals, acoustic piano, backing vocals and string arrangements
- Bill Mays – keyboards
- Paul Shaffer – electric piano
- Mitch Holder – guitar
- Jeff Mironov – guitar
- Lee Ritenour – guitar
- Jay Graydon – guitar
- Will Lee – bass
- Bob Babbitt – bass
- Ronnie Zito – drums
- Jimmy Young – drums
- Alan Estes – percussion
- Jimmy Maelen – percussion
- Artie Butler – orchestration
- Dick Behrke – orchestration
- Richard Winzeler – orchestration
- Jimmie Haskell – orchestratiom
- Shaun Harris – contractor
- Artie Kaplan – contractor
- Ginger Blake – backing vocals
- Laura Creamer – backing vocals
- Linda Dillard – backing vocals
- Ron Dante – backing vocals

=== Production ===
- Barry Manilow – producer, cover design and liner notes
- Ron Dante – producer
- Michael DeLugg – engineer
- Derek Du Nann – assistant engineer
- Sterling Sound (New York, NY) – mastering location
- Lee Gurst – cover design and photography

== Charts ==
Chart (1978)	Position
Australia (Kent Music Report)	8
Canada Top Albums/CDs (RPM)	4
United Kingdom (Official Charts Company)	12
United States (Billboard 200)	3

=== Year-end charts ===
Chart (1978)	Position
Canada RPM Top 100 Albums	16
US Billboard 200	16

== Certifications ==
Region	Certification	Certified units/sales
United Kingdom (BPI)	Silver	60,000^{^}
United States (RIAA)	3× Platinum	3,000,000^{^}
^{^} Shipments figures based on certification alone.
