= Lonely Together (Barry Manilow song) =

Single by Barry Manilow

from the album Barry
- B-side: "The Last Duet" (with Lily Tomlin)
- Released: March 1981
- Genre: Pop, soft rock
- Label: Arista
- Songwriter(s): Kenny Nolan

Barry Manilow singles chronology
"I Made It Through the Rain" (1980)	"Lonely Together" (1981)	"The Old Songs" (1981)

"Lonely Together" is a 1981 song recorded by Barry Manilow. It was written by Kenny Nolan. The song was the second single release from Manilow's 1980 album, Barry.

Record World said that the song's "striking string/choral arrangement is primed for pop-A/C acceptance."

== Chart history ==
"Lonely Together" peaked at number 45 on the US Billboard Hot 100. It reached number seven on the U.S. adult contemporary chart. In Ireland and the UK, it reached numbers 20 and 21, respectively.

Chart (1981)	Peak position
Ireland (IRMA)	20
UK Singles Chart	21
US Billboard Hot 100	45
US Billboard Adult Contemporary	7
US Cash Box Top 100	47
