= Let's Hang On! =

1965 song performed by The Four Seasons

Single by the Four Seasons

from the album Gold Vault of Hits
- B-side: "On Broadway Tonight" (from the album Rag Doll)
- Released: September 1965
- Genre: Rock; soul; pop rock
- Length: 3:15
- Label: Philips
- Songwriter: Bob Crewe-Sandy Linzer-Denny Randell
- Producer: Bob Crewe

The Four Seasons singles chronology
"Since I Don't Have You" (1965)	"Let's Hang On!" (1965)	"Don't Think Twice" (1965)

"Let's Hang On!" is a song composed by Bob Crewe, Sandy Linzer, and Denny Randell that was popularized by the Four Seasons in 1965.

== The Four Seasons version ==
The Four Seasons' recording reached No. 3 in the Billboard Hot 100 singles chart, the group's highest placement since "Rag Doll" hit the top spot in July 1964.

This was the last Four Seasons hit to feature bass singer/bassist Nick Massi. The same month "Let's Hang On!" was released, Massi left the group and was temporarily replaced by the band's arranger Charles Calello before Joe Long came in as Massi's full-time replacement.

The popularity of "Let's Hang On!" has been attributed to the inclusion of several devices into the recording: a two-line introduction (sung by lead singer Frankie Valli), the use of two fuzz guitars (one guitarist playing low notes, another playing high notes on a fuzz bass), a chorus loaded with hooks and sung in falsetto, and backing vocals giving counterpoint with Valli's lead vocal. It re-established the group's presence in the Top Ten (of the Hot 100) as The Four Seasons were in a flurry of activity, recording albums both as The Four Seasons and as supporting musicians for Valli's rekindled "solo" career. In the UK, the song was a No. 4 hit for the group.

Billboard described the song as having a "hard-driving dance rhythm." Cash Box described it as a "hard-rockin' fast-moving rhythmic ode about a lucky fella who is mighty pleased that he's fortunate enough to have met the girl of his dreams."

The single's B-side, "On Broadway Tonight", was the theme of a CBS-TV variety series (1964–1965) hosted by Rudy Vallee.

=== Charts ===
==== Weekly charts ====
Chart (1965–66)	Peak position
Canada Top Singles (RPM)	3
New Zealand (Lever Hit Parade)	8
South Africa (Springbok Radio)	19
UK (OCC)	4
US Billboard Hot 100	3
US Cash Box Top 100	1

==== Year-end charts ====
Chart (1966)	Rank
US Billboard Hot 100	??
US Cash Box Top 100	41

== Barry Manilow cover ==
"Let's Hang On!"

Single by Barry Manilow

from the album If I Should Love Again
- B-side: "No Other Love"
- Released: March 1982
- Genre: Soft music
- Length: 3:15
- Label: Arista
- Songwriter: Bob Crewe-Sandy Linzer-Denny Randell
- Producer: Barry Manilow

Barry Manilow singles chronology
"Somewhere Down the Road" (1981)	"Let's Hang On!" (1982)	"Oh Julie" (1982)

In 1981, the song was revived by Barry Manilow who hit No. 6 on the U.S. Billboard Adult Contemporary chart and No. 32 on the Hot 100. The single climbed to No. 12 in the United Kingdom and was certified silver, while peaking at No. 4 in Australia, No. 16 in Germany and No. 8 in Ireland.

=== Charts ===
==== Weekly charts ====
Chart (1982)	Peak position
Australia (Kent Music Report)	4
Ireland (IRMA)	8
UK (OCC)	12
US Billboard Hot 100	32
US Adult Contemporary (Billboard)	6
US Cash Box Top 100	35
West Germany	16

==== Year-end charts ====
Chart (1982)	Rank
Australia (Kent Music Report)	27
US (Joel Whitburn's Pop Annual)	186

=== Certifications ===
Region	Certification	Certified units/sales
Australia (ARIA)	Gold	50,000^{^}
United Kingdom (BPI)	Silver	250,000^{^}
^{^} Shipments figures based on certification alone.

== Other cover versions ==
In 1969, Johnny Johnson and the Bandwagon covered the song and took it to No. 36 in the UK singles chart. Australian soft rock group, Dove, provided their rendition in 1975.

In 1980, the song was covered by British doo-wop band Darts who took it to No. 11 in the UK singles chart. This was the band's last UK top 40 single.

In March 1990, British band Shooting Party covered the song. It peaked at No. 66 in the UK singles chart.

In 1995, The Manhattan Transfer covered the song on their album Tonin', featuring lead guest vocals by the original singer Frankie Valli. The album reached No. 123 on the Billboard 200.
