= I Made It Through the Rain =

Single by Barry Manilow

from the album Barry
- B-side: "Only in Chicago"
- Released: November 1980
- Genre: Pop, easy listening
- Length: 3:57 (7" edit); 4:25 (album version)
- Label: Arista
- Songwriters: Gerard Kenny; Drey Shepperd; Barry Manilow; Bruce Sussman; Jack Feldman
- Producers: Barry Manilow; Ron Dante

Barry Manilow singles chronology
"Bermuda Triangle" (1980)	"I Made It Through the Rain" (1980)	"Lonely Together" (1981)

"I Made It Through the Rain" is a song that became a hit after it was recorded by American singer Barry Manilow, also included on his 1980 album, Barry. The song was originally recorded in 1979 by its co-writer Gerard Kenny who composed it with Drey Shepperd about a struggling musician who never gives up. Manilow heard the song and revised the lyric with Jack Feldman and Bruce Sussman to make the song about the everyday person's struggles, rather than those of a profession.

According to Billboard, "I Made It Through the Rain" "sustains a rather contemplative mood with gradual building and finally one of Manilow's most dynamic finishes. Record World praised Manilow's "resounding vocal performance" and the song's "string grandeur."

In the U.S., Manilow's version peaked at number 10 on the Billboard Hot 100 (his 11th and last top ten on that chart to date) and at number 4 on the Adult Contemporary chart. Kenny's original version was included on his 1979 RCA Records album called Made It Through the Rain, which reached the top 20 of the UK Albums Chart and remains on his set-list at concerts as of 2024.

== Chart history ==
=== Weekly charts ===
Chart (1980–81)	Peak position
Canada Top Singles (RPM)	34
Ireland (IRMA)	20
UK Singles Chart	37
U.S. Billboard Hot 100	10
U.S. Billboard Adult Contemporary	4
U.S. Cash Box Top 100	18

=== Year-end charts ===
Chart (1981)	Rank
US Billboard Hot 100	89
