= Bermuda Triangle (song) =

Single by Barry Manilow

from the album Barry
- B-side: "Only in Chicago"
- Released: 1980
- Length: 3:45
- Label: Arista
- Songwriter(s): Barry Manilow, Bruce Sussman, Jack Feldman
- Producer(s): Barry Manilow, Ron Dante

"Bermuda Triangle" is a song by Barry Manilow, from his album Barry. Released as a single in 1981, it reached number 15 in the UK Singles Chart, number 16 in Germany and number 23 in Ireland.

The song expresses fear at the prospect of entering the Bermuda Triangle and features tonicizations, the cycle of fifths and a brief modulation to the tonic minor, which represents Manilow 'losing his woman'.

== Chart history ==
Chart (1981)	Peak position
Germany	16
Ireland (IRMA)	23
UK (OCC)	15
