= Somewhere Down the Road (Barry Manilow song) =

Single by Barry Manilow

from the album If I Should Love Again
- B-side: "The Old Songs"
- Released: September 1981
- Recorded: 1981
- Genre: Pop
- Length: 3:59
- Label: Arista
- Songwriters: Cynthia Weil, Tom Snow
- Producer: Barry Manilow

Barry Manilow singles chronology
"The Old Songs" (1981)	"Somewhere Down the Road" (1981)	"Let's Hang On!" (1982)

"Somewhere Down the Road" is a popular song written by Cynthia Weil and Tom Snow and most famously recorded in 1981 by Barry Manilow. Weil wrote the song's lyrics and Snow wrote the melody.

== Release ==
The song was chosen for Barry Manilow by Arista Records' then-president, Clive Davis, and recorded by Manilow on his album If I Should Love Again. Released as the follow-up to the top 20 hit "The Old Songs", "Somewhere Down the Road" did moderately well as a single in early 1982, reaching No. 21 on the Billboard Hot 100. On February 20, 1982, the song reached No. 1 on Billboard's Adult Contemporary chart and stayed there for two weeks. In Canada, the song reached number seven on the Adult Contemporary chart.

Record World called it a "warm ballad" in which "Manilow's reassuring vocal is complemented with sparkling piano leads."

== In popular culture ==
The song was introduced to new audiences when it was prominently featured in an episode of the TV show Ally McBeal in 2001. In the episode "Reach Out and Touch" (which guest-starred Manilow as the subject of the title character's hallucinations), the song was performed by Manilow and singer/series regular Vonda Shepard.

In 1996, the song was used in an episode of Philippine drama Villa Quintana on GMA Network.

== Charts ==
Chart (1981–82)	Peak position
Canada RPM Adult Contemporary	7
US Billboard Hot 100	21
US Adult Contemporary (Billboard)	1

== See also ==
- List of number-one adult contemporary singles of 1982 (U.S.)
