= Ready to Take a Chance Again =

Single by Barry Manilow

from the album Foul Play soundtrack
- B-side: "Sweet Life"
- Released: September 1978
- Studio: A&M (Hollywood)
- Genre: Pop, Easy Listening
- Length: 3:01
- Label: Arista
- Songwriters: Charles Fox, Norman Gimbel
- Producers: Barry Manilow, Ron Dante

Barry Manilow singles chronology
"Copacabana" (1978)	"Ready to Take a Chance Again" (1978)	"Somewhere in the Night" (1979)

"Ready to Take a Chance Again" is a 1978 international hit single performed by Barry Manilow. The song was composed by Charles Fox, with lyrics by Fox's writing partner, Norman Gimbel. Manilow conceived and supervised the song's recording in partnership with Ron Dante.

It is the theme song of the movie, Foul Play, starring Goldie Hawn and Chevy Chase. It is one of two Manilow songs featured in that movie, the other being "Copacabana".

The song recounts the experience of a despairing man who has been hurt by love and therefore has retreated into the safety of an emotional shell. His life then continues on a flat but even keel until he meets someone who causes him to consider taking a chance with love again.

Both the 45 RPM single and the track on Manilow's hit collections are monaural, despite being labeled otherwise. The only source for this song in true stereo is the original Foul Play soundtrack, which is missing some elements of the single (a harp at 0:25 and orchestration beginning at 0:45, and a piano glissando at 2:18 is mixed way down).

== Reception ==
On September 10, 1978, "Ready to Take a Chance Again" entered the U.S. Billboard Hot 100 chart at position number 70; and on November 12, 1978, it peaked at number 11 (for two weeks). It spent 15 weeks on the chart. It reached number 5 on Billboard's Adult Contemporary Tracks chart. On the Cash Box chart, the song spent two weeks at number seven. In Canada, the song peaked at number four for two weeks.

"Ready to Take a Chance Again" was nominated for Best Song at the 1978 Academy Awards. It lost, however, to Donna Summer's "Last Dance" from the movie, Thank God It's Friday.

In Germany, "Ready to Take a Chance Again" was backed with the re-release of "Mandy," which had been only a minor hit on its prior release.

Cash Box said it has a "somber beginning and [builds] to soaring end." Record World called it "a romantic ballad enveloped in a lush and lovely production."

== Chart performance ==
=== Weekly charts ===
Chart (1978–79)	Peak position
Canadian RPM Adult Contemporary	1
Canadian RPM Top Singles	4
Sweden	5
U.S. Billboard Hot 100	11
U.S. Billboard Hot Adult Contemporary Tracks	5
U.S. Cashbox Top 100	7

=== Year-end charts ===
Chart (1978)	Rank
U.S. Cash Box Top 100	68
Canada RPM Top Singles	64
