= The Old Songs =

Song written by David Pomeranz and Buddy Kaye

Single by David Pomeranz

from the album The Truth of Us and Born for You: His Best and More
- Released: 1980; 1999
- Recorded: 1977–1979; 1999
- Genre: Pop
- Length: 4:10
- Label: Pacific (US); MCA Universal/PolyEast Records (Philippines)
- Songwriters: David Pomeranz, Buddy Kaye

Music video
- "The Old Songs" (lyric video) on YouTube

"The Old Songs" is a song written by David Pomeranz and Buddy Kaye and was featured on Pomeranz's 1980 album, The Truth of Us. In 1999, the song was re-recorded again in Pomeranz's 1999 album, Born for You: His Best and More.

== Barry Manilow version ==
"The Old Songs"

Single by Barry Manilow

from the album If I Should Love Again
- B-side: "Don't Fall in Love With Me"
- Released: October 1981
- Genre: Pop; soft rock
- Length: 4:42
- Label: Arista
- Songwriters: David Pomeranz, Buddy Kaye

Barry Manilow singles chronology
"Lonely Together" (1981)	"The Old Songs" (1981)	"Somewhere Down the Road" (1981)

A year after its release, American singer Barry Manilow would later record the track for his 1981 album, "If I Should Love Again".

"The Old Songs" peaked at number fifteen on the U.S. Billboard Hot 100 and was Manilow's eleventh number one on the Billboard Adult Contemporary chart, spending three weeks at number one.

== Chart performance ==
=== Weekly charts ===
Chart (1981–1982)	Peak position
Canadian RPM Adult Contemporary	2
UK	48
U.S. Billboard Hot 100	15
U.S. Billboard Hot Adult Contemporary Tracks	1
U.S. Cash Box Top 100	16

=== Year-end charts ===
Chart (1981)	Rank
U.S. (Joel Whitburn's Pop Annual)	98

== See also ==
- List of Billboard Adult Contemporary number ones of 1981
