= David Pomeranz =

- Born: February 9, 1951 (age 75); Long Island, New York, U.S.
- Genres: Pop, adult contemporary
- Occupations: Singer; songwriter; composer; lyricist; writer for musical theatre
- Instruments: Vocals, piano, keyboards, acoustic guitar
- Years active: 1968–present
- Labels: Rhino, Pacific, PolyEast Records (Philippines)
- Website: www.davidpomeranz.com

David Pomeranz (born February 9, 1951) is an American singer, songwriter, composer, lyricist, and writer for musical theater, known for his pop and adult contemporary music. He has sold over 40 million records worldwide and is famous for hits like "Tryin' to Get the Feeling Again" and "Born for You."

== Solo career ==
Born and raised on Long Island, Pomeranz expressed interest in music from an early age, singing in the synagogue choir, learning to play the piano, guitar and drums, and writing and recording songs by the age of fourteen. From October 1968 to January 1969, he was lead singer for the Ohio-based rock band East Orange Express and when Pomeranz left the group, fellow member Dan Schear took over. When he was nineteen, MCA/Decca signed him to a contract that yielded two albums, New Blues and Time to Fly (the latter featuring Chick Corea), and he began touring the country as the opening act for Rod Stewart, Billy Joel, Three Dog Night and the Doors, among others.

In the late 1980s, Pomeranz collaborated with Russian rock star Alexander Malinin on the pre-glasnost "Faraway Lands", which they performed live in Moscow's Gorky Park for an episode of the television sitcom Head of the Class, the first time an American series filmed there. He also sang the song "Nothing's Gonna Stop Me Now", which was the theme song for the television series Perfect Strangers.

Pomeranz continued to tour as a solo act, appearing in such venues as the Hollywood Bowl, Kennedy Center, Olympic Stadium in Munich, and the Kremlin. He and David Shire collaborated on the theme song for the United Nations World Summit for Children entitled "In Our Hands", which the duo performed at the closing ceremonies for Ted Turner's Goodwill Games in Seattle. In 1999, Pomeranz recorded the CD Born for You – His Best and More in the Philippines, a compilation album that became the country's best-selling album of 1999 and the 13th best-selling album of all time. Additional recordings include The Eyes of Christmas and On This Day.

== Songwriter and composer ==
Pomeranz's songs include "Tryin' to Get the Feeling Again" and "The Old Songs", both recorded by Barry Manilow; and "It's in Every One of Us", which was featured in the TV specials John Denver and the Muppets: A Christmas Together, Rocky Mountain Holiday and A Muppet Family Christmas, the Dave Clark musical Time, the film Big, and at the 1988 Summer Olympics in Seoul, South Korea. His work has been performed by artists as diverse as Bette Midler, Phoebe Snow, Freddie Mercury, Richie Sambora, Missy Elliott, the Carpenters, Harry Belafonte, Andrea Marcovicci, Donna Summer, Lillias White, the Hollies and Cliff Richard, and his various songwriting projects have amassed a total of twenty-two platinum and eighteen gold albums.

Pomeranz has composed for feature films, television (earning a 1981 Emmy Award nomination for Outstanding Achievement in Music and Lyrics for the CBS television film Homeward Bound) and the stage, including the hit West End musical Time; Little Tramp, based on the life and career of Charles Chaplin, staged for the 1995 Eugene O'Neill Theater Festival in Waterford, Connecticut and presented in a 1996 concert version in St. Petersburg, Russia; and a musical adaptation of A Tale of Two Cities, produced by Bill Kenwright for the Theatre Royal, Windsor (1998) and the Alexandria Theatre in Birmingham (1999). With Kathie Lee Gifford he has written two projects, Under the Bridge, which premiered off-Broadway in January 2005, and Saving Aimee, based on the life of evangelist Aimee Semple McPherson, which debuted at the White Plains Performing Arts Center in October 2005 and was staged at the Signature Theatre in Arlington, Virginia in April–May 2007. In 2012, Saving Aimee was renamed to Scandalous and opened on November 15, 2012 in the Neil Simon Theatre on Broadway in New York City.

== Personal life ==
David is a member of the Church of Scientology.

== Discography ==
=== Albums ===
==== Studio albums ====
- New Blues (1971)
- Time to Fly (1971)
- It's in Every One of Us (1975)
- The Truth of Us (1981)
- Come Home (1993)
- Born for You: His Best and More (1999)
- The Eyes of Christmas (2000)
- On This Day (2001)
- Hold Tight (2007)
- A Personal Touch (2009)
- You're the Inspiration (2012)

==== Compilation albums ====
- Best of David Pomeranz (1999)

==== Collaboration albums ====
- The Road to Freedom (with L. Ron Hubbard & Friends) (1986)

=== Singles ===
- "If You Walked Away" (1975)
- "The Old Songs" (1981; re-recorded 1999)
- "King and Queen of Hearts" (Zapped! movie theme song) (1982, re-recorded 1999)
- "Got to Believe in Magic" (Zapped! movie theme song) (1982, re-recorded 1999) (later covered by Side A in the 2002 Filipino film Got 2 Believe and by Juris in 2013 for the Filipino drama series Got to Believe)
- "Born for You" (1999)
- "On This Day" (2001)
