= Even Now (Barry Manilow song) =

Single by Barry Manilow

from the album Even Now
- B-side: "I Was a Fool (To Let You Go)"
- Released: April 1978
- Genre: Pop
- Length: 3:28
- Label: Arista 0330
- Songwriters: Marty Panzer (words); Barry Manilow (music)
- Producers: Ron Dante; Barry Manilow

Barry Manilow singles chronology
"Can't Smile Without You" (1978)	"Even Now" (1978)	"Copacabana" (1978)

"Even Now" is a 1978 song by American adult contemporary and pop music singer Barry Manilow. It is the title track from his 1978 album, and Manilow wrote the music and co-produced the track with Ron Dante. The words were written by Marty Panzer.

Released as the second single from the album, "Even Now" became a top 20 hit on the Billboard Hot 100 chart in June 1978, peaking at No. 19. It became Manilow's ninth song to reach number one on the Billboard easy listening chart, spending three weeks atop the chart beginning May 27, 1978.

Billboard described "Even Now" as "one of Manilow's classiest efforts." Cash Box said that "Barry reaches shivering moments." Record World called it "an emotional, sen-timental ballad in [Manilow's] trademark style."

== Composition ==
The song is performed in the key of B major, with the final chorus in C major. It moves at a tempo of 66 beats per minute in common time. Manilow's vocals span from B_{3} to G_{5}.

In his autobiography Sweet Life, Manilow said that the song was "one of my personal favorites, which never fails to move me. It reminded me of the great times I had collaborating with" Marty Panzer, with whom the singer had worked previously. The lyrics of this song describe the remorse and regret felt by the lyricist over leaving a woman with whom he had a great relationship with for a much better life with a different woman, even though his instincts told him that it wasn't the right move to make.

== Charts ==
Chart (1978)	Peak position
Canada Top Singles (RPM)	17
Canada Adult Contemporary (RPM)	14
New Zealand (RIANZ)	17
US Billboard Hot 100	19
US Adult Contemporary (Billboard)	1
US Cash Box Top 100	17

== See also ==
- List of number-one adult contemporary singles of 1978 (U.S.)

== Other Versions ==
- Ray Fisher, 2023, Forever Fanilow
