= Copacabana (song) =

1978 single by Barry Manilow

"Copacabana (At the Copa)"
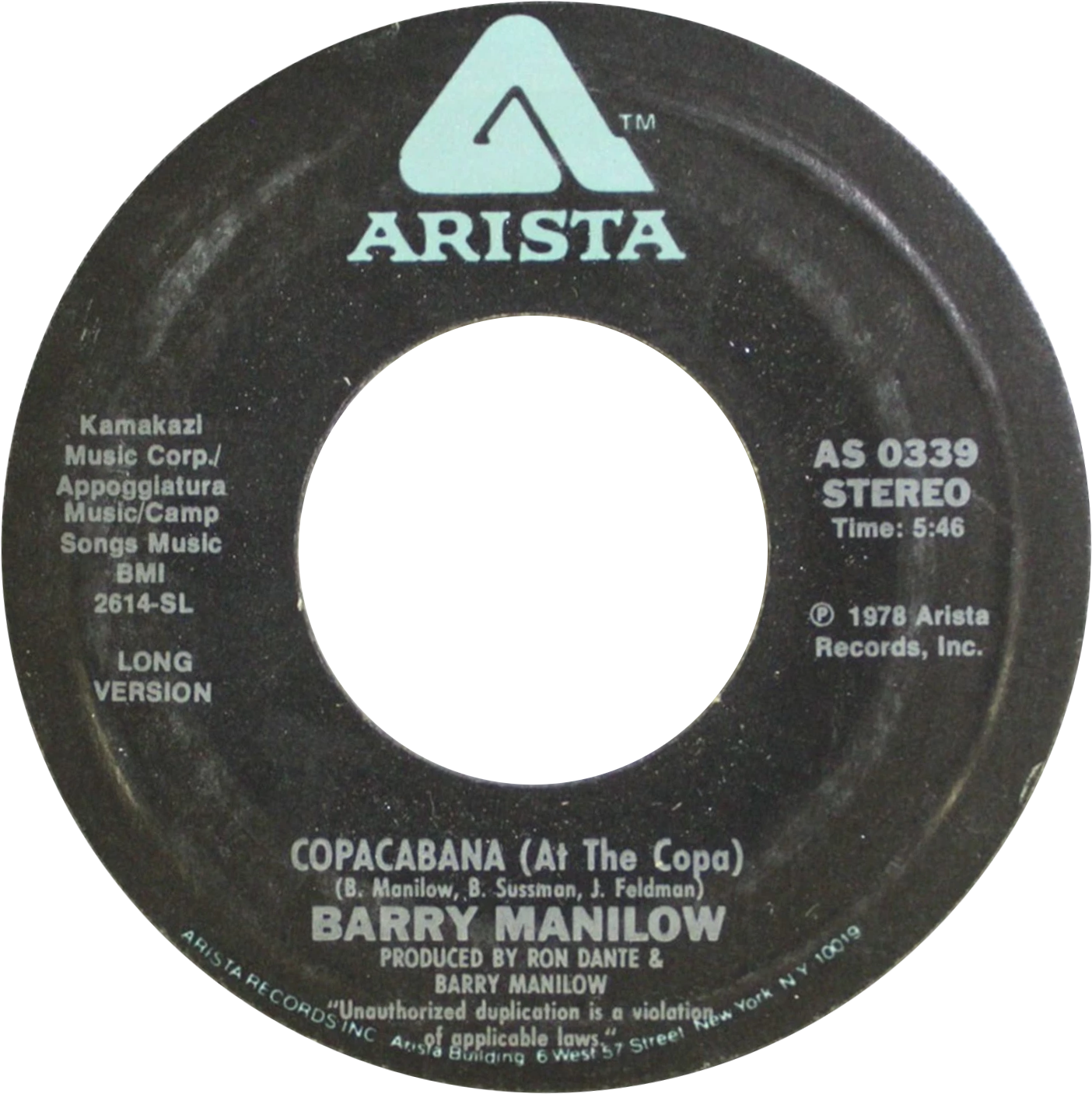
- One of label variants of the US single ("long version")

Single by Barry Manilow

from the album Even Now
- B-side: "A Linda Song"
- Released: June 1978
- Recorded: July 1977
- Genre: Disco; samba
- Length: 5:46 (album version); 3:58 (radio edit)
- Label: Arista
- Songwriters: Barry Manilow; Jack Feldman; Bruce Sussman
- Producers: Barry Manilow; Ron Dante

Barry Manilow singles chronology
"Even Now" (1978)	"Copacabana (At the Copa)" (1978)	"Ready to Take a Chance Again" (1979)

Audio
- "Copacabana" on YouTube
- "Copacabana" (radio edit) on YouTube

Audio sample
- file; help

Short version
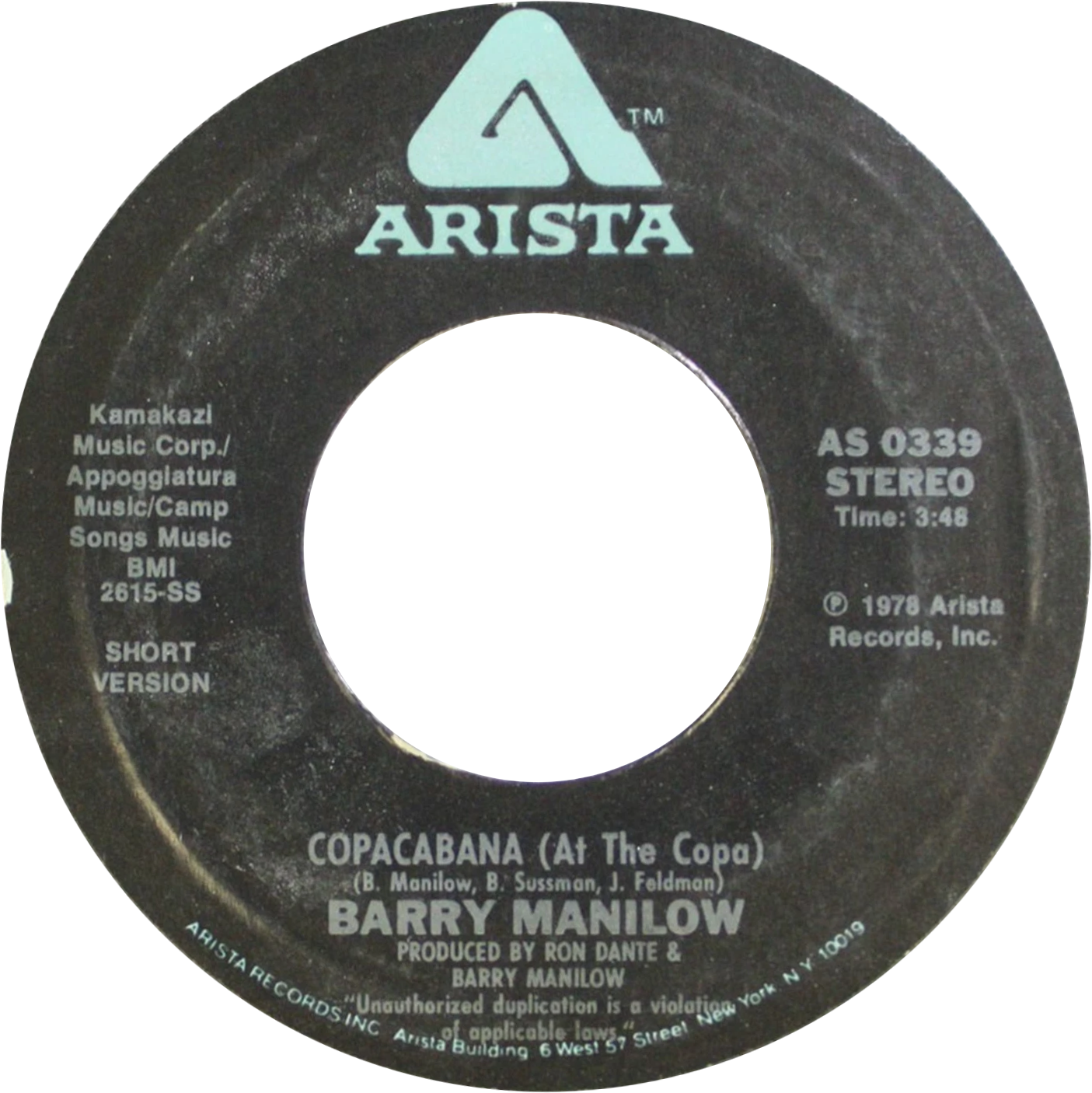
- One of label variants of the US single

"Copacabana", also known as "Copacabana (At the Copa)", is a song recorded by Barry Manilow. Written by Manilow, Jack Feldman, and Bruce Sussman, it was released in 1978 as the third single from Manilow's fifth studio album, Even Now (1978). The same year, "Copacabana" appeared in the soundtrack album of the film Foul Play.

== Background ==
The song was inspired by a conversation between Manilow and Sussman at the Copacabana Hotel in Rio de Janeiro, when they discussed whether there had ever been a song called "Copacabana". After returning to the U.S., Manilow—who, in the 1960s, had been a regular visitor to the Copacabana nightclub in New York City—suggested that Sussman and Feldman write the lyrics to a story song for him. They did so, and Manilow supplied the music.

American singer and dancer Lola Falana inspired the song's famous lyric, "Her name was Lola, she was a showgirl".

The song's lyrics call the Copacabana nightclub "the hottest spot north of Havana". The story focuses on Lola, a Copacabana showgirl, and her sweetheart Tony, a bartender at the club. One night, an ostentatiously wealthy man named Rico takes a fancy to Lola, but Tony intervenes when Rico becomes aggressive. The ensuing brawl ends in a gun being fired; it is initially unclear "who shot who", but it soon becomes apparent the incident removed Tony out of Lola's life, either by killing him or putting him behind bars. Thirty years later, the club has been transformed into a discotheque, but a middle-aged Lola remains in her showgirl attire, now a customer at the bar who "drinks herself half blind" where she has lost of her youth, her Tony, and her sanity.

== Release and reception ==
"Copacabana" debuted on Billboard magazine's Top 40 chart on July 7, 1978, and peaked at number 8. It has also reached the Top 10 in Belgium, Canada, France and the Netherlands. Internationally, the song is Manilow's third-greatest hit. The track was his first gold single for a song he wrote or co-wrote. Additionally, the song earned Manilow his first and only Grammy Award for Best Male Pop Vocal Performance in February 1979.

Cash Box said that "a Latin beat, congas and added percussion, strings and horns make it unusual."

== Television film and musical ==
In 1985, Manilow and his collaborators Bruce Sussman and Jack Feldman expanded the song into a full-length, made-for-television musical, also called Copacabana, writing many additional songs and expanding the plot suggested by the song.

This film version was then further expanded by Manilow, Feldman, and Sussman into a full-length, two-act stage musical, again titled Copacabana, which ran at the Prince of Wales Theatre on London's West End for two years before a lengthy tour of the UK. An American production was later mounted that toured the US for over a year. Over 200 productions of the show have since been mounted worldwide.

== Personnel ==
- Barry Manilow – vocals, acoustic piano
- Bill Mays – keyboards
- Mitch Holder – guitar
- Will Lee – bass
- Ronnie Zito – drums
- Alan Estes – percussion
- Artie Butler – orchestration
- Ginger Blake, Laura Creamer, Linda Dillard – backing vocals

== Charts ==
=== Weekly charts ===
Chart (1978–1979)	Peak position
Belgium	5
Canada (RPM 100 Singles)	7
Canada (Adult Contemporary)	3
Canada (Dance/Urban)	2
France	2
Germany	23
Netherlands (Dutch Top 40)	6
Netherlands (Single Top 100)	7
New Zealand	37
US Billboard Hot 100	8
US Adult Contemporary	6
US Dance Club Songs	15

Chart (1993–1994)	Peak position
Australia (KMR)	92
Ireland (IRMA)	21
UK (OCC)	22

=== Year-end charts ===
Chart (1978)	Rank
Australia (Kent Music Report)	76
Belgium	51
Canada (RPM)	52
Netherlands	92
US Billboard Hot 100	74
US Cash Box Top 100	82

== Certifications ==
Region	Certification	Certified units/sales
New Zealand (RMNZ)	Gold	15,000^{‡}
United Kingdom (BPI)	Gold	400,000^{‡}
United States (RIAA)	Gold	1,000,000^{^}
^{^} Shipments figures based on certification alone.^{‡} Sales+streaming figures based on certification alone.

== Cover versions ==
- Liza Minnelli performed "Copacabana" on a 1979 episode of the American syndicated television program The Muppet Show.
- Kylie Minogue performed the song on her 2008 KylieX2008 tour.
- The Harvard Din & Tonics performed "Copacabana" in 2024, resulting in a viral TikTok video.
