= Bruce Sussman =

American lyricist (born 1949)

Bruce Howard Sussman
- Born: July 12, 1949 (age 76); Jackson Heights, Queens, New York, U.S.
- Education: Franklin and Marshall College (1971)
- Occupations: Lyricist and librettist
- Spouse: Rob Shuter (m. 2011)

Bruce Howard Sussman (born July 12, 1949) is an American lyricist and librettist. Though he has collaborated with numerous composers, he is probably best known for his work with his long-time collaborator, Barry Manilow. Together, they have written more than two hundred songs for numerous recording artists, films, stage musicals and television programs.

== Life and career ==
Sussman was born in Jackson Heights, Queens, New York, United States, to a Jewish family and was raised on Long Island, where he graduated from Sanford H. Calhoun High School in Merrick, New York. He then graduated from Franklin and Marshall College in Lancaster, Pennsylvania.

Upon his return to New York, he was accepted into the BMI Lehman Engel Musical Theatre Workshop. During this period, he met Barry Manilow, and they began writing jingles and songs together. Among their first successes was "Copacabana (At the Copa)", which became Sussman's first gold record as well as a Grammy Award-winning, international hit. It would later become the source material for a made-for-television film musical of the same title, a one-act casino show, and then a two-act stage musical, for which he co-authored the book and lyrics with Manilow and Jack Feldman. The show ran for two years at the Prince of Wales Theatre on London West End, before extensive tours of Britain and the United States.

Also for the stage, he co-authored with Feldman the song scores for Ted Tally’s Coming Attractions—which starred Christine Baranski, Jonathan Hadary and Griffin Dunne—and Wendy Wasserstein’s first musical, Miami—which starred Phyllis Newman, Marcia Lewis, Fisher Stevens, and Jane Krakowski. Both shows were produced by André Bishop at Playwrights Horizons off-Broadway. He also contributed a song to Howard Crabtree's off-Broadway and London productions of Whoop-Dee-Doo! Most recently, he is the author of the book and lyrics for Harmony: A New Musical about the Comedian Harmonists. The show had developmental productions at the La Jolla Playhouse, the Alliance Theatre, and the Ahmanson Theatre. It made its New York debut, in a production directed by Warren Carlyle, at the National Yiddish Theatre Folksbiene in March 2022. It opened on Broadway on November 13, 2023. Sussman is the 2022 recipient of the Drama Desk Award for Outstanding Book of a Musical for Harmony.

With Manilow, Sussman also wrote song scores for the animated films Thumbelina and The Pebble and the Penguin, as well as a song for Disney's Oliver and Company.

== Personal life ==
In 1994, Sussman met entertainment columnist Rob Shuter, in Edinburgh, Scotland. They were married on October 29, 2011.
