= Copacabana =

Copacabana most commonly refers to:

- Copacabana, Rio de Janeiro, Brazil
- Copacabana (nightclub), New York City, United States

Copacabana may also refer to:

== Places ==
- Copacabana, Catamarca, Argentina
- Copacabana, Bolivia
- Copacabana Municipality, Bolivia
- Fort Copacabana, Brazil
- Copacabana, Antioquia, Colombia
- Copacabana, New South Wales, Gosford, NSW, Australia
- Copacabana Beach in Dubrovnik, Croatia, a lesser-known beach by that name

== Arts and entertainment ==
- "Copacabana" (song), a 1978 song by Barry Manilow
  - Copacabana (1985 film), a 1985 musical TV film based on the song
    - Copacabana: The Original Motion Picture Soundtrack Album, soundtrack album for the TV film
  - Copacabana (musical), a 1994 musical based on the song and the TV film
    - Copacabana: Original London Cast Recording
- Copacabana (Sarah Vaughan album), a 1979 album by Sarah Vaughan
- Copacabana (1947 film), starring Groucho Marx and Carmen Miranda
- Copacabana (2010 film), 2010 French film starring Isabelle Huppert

== Other uses ==
- Virgen de Copacabana, the patron saint of Bolivia
- Copacabana Palace, a hotel in Rio de Janeiro
- Copacabana Restaurant, Pike Place Market, Seattle, Washington, U.S.
- Copacabana Hotel, located in Miramar, Havana, Cuba

== See also ==
- COPACOBANA (Cost-Optimized PArallel COde Breaker), a custom-built computer designed to break DES-encrypted messages at a low cost
