= Manilow (album) =

Studio album by Barry Manilow
- Released: 1985
- Studios: Cherokee Studios, Sound Labs and Capitol Studios (Hollywood, California); Studio 55, Record Plant, Lion Share Studios and The Village Recorder (Los Angeles, California); LeGonks West (West Hollywood, California); Larrabee Sound Studios (North Hollywood, California); Mediasound and Sigma Sound Studios (New York City, New York); Ambience Recorders (Farmington Hills, Michigan); Sheffield Studios (Baltimore, Maryland)
- Genre: Pop
- Length: 42:12
- Label: RCA
- Producers: Barry Manilow; Howie Rice; Kevin DiSimone; Michael DeLugg; George Duke; Bob Gaudio

Barry Manilow chronology
Copacabana: Soundtrack (1985)	Manilow (1985)	Swing Street (1987)

Singles from Manilow
- 1. "In Search of Love" Released: 1985; 2. "I'm Your Man" Released: July 1986; 3. "He Doesn't Care (But I Do)" Released: 1986

Professional ratings
Review scores
Source	Rating
Allmusic	3/5 stars

Manilow is the eleventh studio album by singer-songwriter Barry Manilow, released in 1985. It was his first album to miss the Top 40 and fail to earn a gold certification. Many feel it was due to the prominence of synthesizers, a departure from his renowned piano ballads. This album was one of Manilow's two albums with RCA Records.

The only other release with the RCA Company was an original soundtrack album of his 1985 CBS television movie, Copacabana, in which he starred as Tony Starr with Annette O'Toole as Lola Lamarr.

== Release ==
Three singles released from this album are "In Search of Love" (#11 US AC, #80 UK), "I'm Your Man" (#86 US, #96 UK) and "He Doesn't Care (But I Do)" (#22 US AC), with "I'm Your Man" becoming the only single from the album to reach the Billboard Hot 100 chart, peaking at number 86. However, "In Search of Love" and "He Doesn't Care (But I Do)" entered the Adult Contemporary chart, peaking at number 11 and 22, respectively.

None of its singles captured the general public, except for the song "If You Were Here with Me Tonight", which became a mainstay in adult contemporary radio setlists.

== Track listing ==
=== 2007 US reissued version ===
Side 1

1. "I'm Your Man" (music: Barry Manilow, Howie Rice; lyrics: Allan Rich) – 4:53
2. "It's All Behind Us Now" (music: Barry Manilow, Howie Rice; lyrics: Allan Rich) – 4:08
3. "In Search of Love" (music: Barry Manilow, Howie Rice; lyrics: Allan Rich) – 4:08
4. "He Doesn't Care (But I Do)" (music: Kevin DiSimone; lyrics: Robin Grean) – 4:16
5. "Some Sweet Day" (music: Barry Manilow; lyrics: Adrienne Anderson) – 5:06

Side 2

1. "At the Dance" (music: Barry Manilow, Charles Fearing; lyrics: Adrienne Anderson) – 3:55
2. "If You Were Here with Me Tonight" (music: Eric Borenstein, Barry Manilow, lyrics: Eric Borenstein, Lisa Thomas) – 4:55
3. "Sweet Heaven (I'm in Love Again)" from the movie Copacabana (music: Barry Manilow; lyrics: Bruce Sussman, Jack Feldman) – 4:05
4. "Ain't Nothing Like the Real Thing" (Duet with Muffy Hendrix) (Nick Ashford, Valerie Simpson) – 3:13
5. "It's a Long Way Up" (John Annesi, Barry Manilow) – 3:30

=== French version ===
Side 1

1. "I'm Your Man" – 4:53
2. "It's All Behind Us Now" – 4:08
3. "In Search of Love" – 4:08
4. "He Doesn't Care But I Do" – 4:16
5. "Some Sweet Day" – 5:06

Side 2

1. "At the Dance" – 3:55
2. "If You Were Here With Me Tonight" – 4:55
3. "Sweet Heaven (I'm in Love Again)" – 4:05
4. "Don't Talk to Me of Love" (Duet with Mireille Mathieu) – 4:10
5. "It's a Long Way Up" – 3:30

=== Italian version ===
Side 1

1. "Amare Chi Si Manchi Tu (Who Needs To Dream)"
2. "I'm Your Man" – 4:53
3. "It's All Behind Us Now" – 4:08
4. "In Search of Love" – 4:08
5. "He Doesn't Care But I Do" – 4:16

Side 2

1. "Con Chi Sei (Some Sweet Day)" – 5:06
2. "At the Dance" – 3:55
3. "If You Were Here With Me Tonight" – 4:55
4. "Sweet Heaven (I'm In Love Again)" – 4:05
5. "It's a Long Way Up" – 3:30

=== Japanese Version ===
Side 1

1. "I'm Your Man" – 4:53
2. "It's All Behind Us Now" – 4:08
3. "In Search of Love" – 4:08
4. "He Doesn't Care But I Do" – 4:16
5. "Some Sweet Day" – 5:06
6. "Sakura"

Side 2

1. "At the Dance" – 3:55
2. "If You Were Here with Me Tonight" – 4:55
3. "Sweet Heaven (I'm in Love Again)" – 4:05
4. "Ain't Nothing Like the Real Thing" (Duet with Muffy Hendrix) – 3:13
5. "It's a Long Way Up" – 3:30
6. "In Search of Love" (Duet with Hideki Saijo)

== Personnel ==
- Barry Manilow – vocals, keyboards (1), drums (1), grand piano (2), backing vocals (4), rhythm track arrangements (8)
- Raymond Crossley – grand piano (1)
- Howie Rice – keyboards (1–3, 9, 10), bass (1, 3, 10), drums (1, 9), string arrangements (2, 3, 9), guitars (3, 9, 10)
- John Philip Shenale – additional synthesizers (1), keyboards (6), synthesizer programming (8)
- Kevin DiSimone – Yamaha grand piano (4), Yamaha DX7 (4), keyboards (4–6), Synclavier (4), Roland Super Jupiter (4), LinnDrum (4), backing vocals (4–6)
- Ron Pedley – Oberheim programming (4), keyboards (5, 6), acoustic piano (10)
- Kevin Jones – Synclavier programming (4), keyboards (5)
- Randy Kerber – keyboards (5), acoustic piano (7, 8), Yamaha TX816 (7)
- Victor Vanacore – keyboards (5, 6), orchestra conductor (8)
- George Duke – Synclavier II (7)
- Jon Gilutin – keyboards (9)
- John Pondel – guitars (4–6, 8)
- Paul Jackson Jr. – acoustic guitar (7), rhythm guitar (7)
- Michael Landau – lead guitar (7)
- Neil Stubenhaus – bass (2, 8)
- Marc Levine – additional bass (4), bass (5, 6)
- Will Lee – bass (5, 6)
- "Ready" Freddie Washington – bass (7)
- Lequeint "Duke" Jobe – bass (9)
- John Robinson – drums (1, 3, 7)
- Rick Shlosser – drums (2)
- Bud Harner – drums (4–6, 8, 10), drum programming (4)
- Peter Moshay – drum programming (5, 6, 8, 10)
- Kerry Ashby – drums (9)
- Terral Santiel – percussion (1, 3, 9, 10)
- Paulinho da Costa – percussion (5, 6)
- Joel Peskin – saxophone (8)
- Barry Fasman – string arrangements (2, 3, 9)
- Alan Foust – string arrangements (5, 6)
- George Del Barrio – string arrangements (7)
- Bill Hughes – string contractor (7)
- Bob Gaudio – rhythm track arrangements (8)
- Artie Butler – orchestra arrangements (8)
- Shaun Harris – orchestra contractor (8), string contractor (9)
- Billie Hughes – backing vocals (1–3, 9, 10)
- Jon Lind – backing vocals (1–3, 9, 10)
- Jason Scheff – backing vocals (1–3, 9, 10)
- Luther Waters – backing vocals (2, 3, 9, 10)
- Oren Waters – backing vocals (2, 3, 9, 10)
- Tommy Funderburk – backing vocals (5, 6)
- Barry Hirschberg – backing vocals (5, 6)
- James Jolis – backing vocals (5, 6)
- Tom Kelly – backing vocals (5, 6, 8)
- Bob Carlisle – backing vocals (8)
- Steve George – backing vocals (8)
- Muffy Hendrix – vocals (9)

== Production ==
- Eric Borenstein – executive producer
- Barry Manilow – producer (1–6, 8–10)
- Howie Rice – producer (1–3, 9, 10)
- Kevin DiSimone – producer (4)
- Michael DeLugg – producer (5, 6)
- George Duke – producer (7)
- Bob Gaudio – producer (8)
- Ria Lewerke – art direction
- Sue Reilly – design
- Matthew Rolston – photography

Technical

- Brian Gardner – mastering at Bernie Grundman Mastering (Hollywood, California)
- John Boghosian – engineer (1)
- Michael DeLugg – mixing (1, 8, 10), engineer (5, 6)
- Joe Marciano – engineer (4)
- Tommy Vicari – engineer (4, 7), mixing (4, 7)
- Erik Zobler – engineer (7)
- Tony D'Amico – recording (8)
- John Arrias – additional engineer (1), engineer (2, 3, 9, 10), mixing (2, 3, 9)
- Glen Holguin – additional engineer (3, 9)
- Bruce Robb – additional engineer (10)
- David Eaton – assistant track engineer (1–3, 9, 10)
- Steve Hirsch – assistant track engineer (1)
- Julie Last – assistant track engineer (1), assistant mix engineer (1–3, 9, 10)
- Kraig Miller – assistant mix engineer (2, 3, 9, 10)
- Khaliq Glover – assistant engineer (4, 7)
- Bruce Smith – assistant engineer (4)
- Mitch Gibson – assistant engineer (7)
- Jimmy Preziosi – assistant track engineer (8)
- Daniel Reed – assistant mix engineer (8)
