= Copacabana (nightclub) =

Nightclub in New York City

- Interactive map of Copacabana
- Address: 625 W 51st St, New York, NY 10019; New York City; United States
- Coordinates: 40.7672628°N 73.9953767°W
- Type: Nightclub

Construction
- Opened: November 10, 1940; 86 years ago
- Reopened: 1976; 1992; 2001; July 2007; July 12, 2011; February 5, 2022

The Copacabana is a New York City nightclub that has existed in several locations. In earlier locations, many entertainers, such as Danny Thomas, Pat Cooper, and the comedy team of Martin and Lewis, made their New York debuts at the Copacabana. The Barry Manilow song "Copacabana" (1978) is named after, and set in, the club. The nightclub was used as a setting in the films Goodfellas, Raging Bull, Tootsie, The Purple Rose of Cairo, Carlito's Way, Lonely Boy, The French Connection, Martin and Lewis, Green Book, Beyond the Sea, The Irishman, and One Night in Miami. It was also used in several plays, including Barry Manilow's Copacabana. The musical film Copacabana (1947), starring Groucho Marx and Carmen Miranda, takes place in the Copacabana, as does the made-for-television film based on the Manilow song, in which Manilow himself starred.

== History ==
=== The 1940s to the 1960s ===
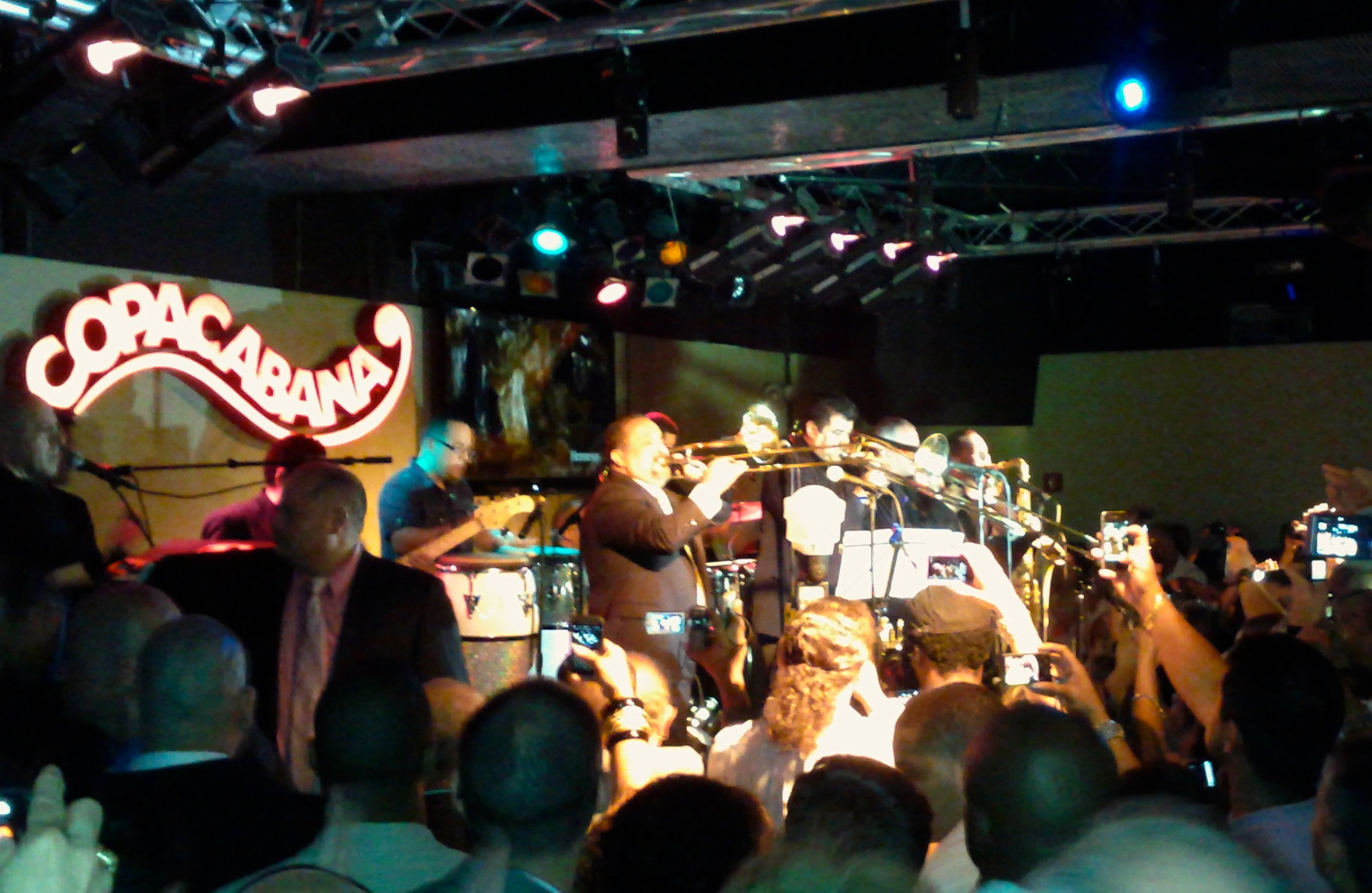
Willie Colón performing opening night at the new Copacabana on July 12, 2011, in Times Square, New York City

The Copacabana (named after Copacabana beach in Rio de Janeiro) opened on November 10, 1940, at 10 East 60th Street in New York City. Although the name of Monte Proser was on the lease, he had a powerful partner: mob boss Frank Costello. Proser (1904–1973), a native Englishman, was a well-connected nightclub owner and press agent whose various clients included Walt Disney, Maria Montez, Mary Pickford, and the Ziegfeld Follies. Costello put Jules Podell on the scene to look after his interests; Podell had a police record and would not have been an acceptable front man for the business, and indeed, the club faced tax problems and a racketeering investigation in 1944. However, by 1948, such pressure had lessened; Proser was out, and Podell was the official owner.

The Copacabana had Brazilian decor and Latin-themed orchestras, while the menu featured Chinese food. The club was also known for its chorus line, "The Copacabana Girls". As early as 1945 it also featured performances of "sweet" big-band music by Shep Fields and his Rippling Rhythm Orchestra which were broadcast live on the WOR Radio Network.

Podell originally had a strict "no blacks" policy. In 1944, Harry Belafonte, then a member of the U.S. Navy, was denied entry with a date. Eventually, Podell was persuaded to change his policy and Belafonte returned in the 1950s as a headliner at the club. Sammy Davis Jr. shattered attendance records with his run in May 1964 and Sam Cooke performed there on July 8, 1964, resulting in the LP Sam Cooke at the Copa. In July 1965, the Supremes made their debut there, resulting in Motown Records booking the Temptations, Martha and the Vandellas, and Marvin Gaye to perform at the Copa over the next few years. The Supremes also recorded The Supremes at the Copa, a live album, there in 1965 that just missed the Top 10, peaking at #11. Marvin Gaye also recorded a live album, as did The Temptations. The Supremes, who proved to be the most successful of all the Motown acts, released The Supremes: Live at the Copa Expanded Edition in 2012, featuring the much-sought-after original repertoire.

Dean Martin and Jerry Lewis were frequent performers at the club and performed their last show there on July 25, 1956, which can be seen in the TV movie Martin and Lewis (2002).

This nightclub achieved a degree of notoriety due to a May 16, 1957, incident involving members of the New York Yankees. On that evening, teammates Mickey Mantle, Whitey Ford, Hank Bauer, Yogi Berra, Johnny Kucks, and Billy Martin, along with the wives of all but Martin, arrived at the nightclub to celebrate Martin's birthday. Sammy Davis Jr. happened to be the headliner. During the performance, a group of apparently intoxicated brawlers started to interfere with Davis' act, even hurling racial slurs at him. This behavior incensed the Yankees, especially Martin, since his roommate was Elston Howard, the first black player to join the Yankees. Tensions erupted between the two groups, and the resulting fracas made newspaper headlines. Several of the Yankees were fined. One of the brawlers, a Bronx deli owner, ended up with a concussion and a broken jaw, and sued Bauer for aggravated assault; the case was thrown out for insufficient evidence. Martin was later traded from the Yankees to the Kansas City Athletics, with this incident cited as a main cause.

=== The 1960s and the 1970s ===
Until 1972, mafioso Joe Gallo operated the venue. After Jules Podell died in 1973, it was closed for three years. It reopened in 1976, at the height of the disco era, and operated as a discothèque. Barry Manilow's hit 1978 song "Copacabana (At The Copa)" referred to the club; the song later became the basis for the made-for-television film in which Manilow himself starred; as of February 2021, it was not known how much of the film's shooting used it as an actual location.

=== After the 1970s ===
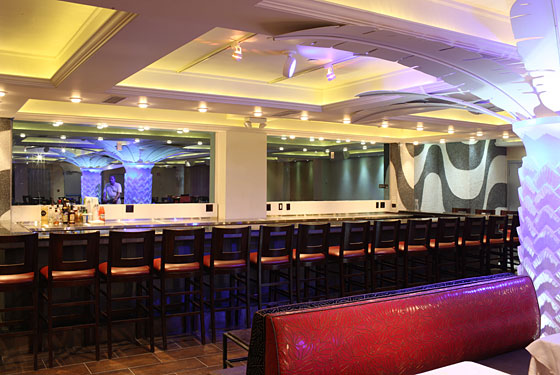
The bar inside the Copacabana, 2011

In 1992, then-owner Peter Dorn moved the club from its original location to 617 West 57th Street. Dorn charged landlord Nicola Biase with "not liking Hispanics", the stated reason for the move.

In 2001, the club was forced to move for a third time to 560 West 34th Street and Eleventh Avenue on the west side of Manhattan, when its landlord terminated its lease early to build office towers on the site. Since then it has presented mostly hip-hop and salsa acts.

On January 20, 2007, the club announced that it would have to move by July 1 because its current location was condemned due to the construction of the extension of the 7 line of the New York City Subway, as well as the construction of the now-cancelled World Product Center. June 30 of the same year was the last night the club was open, with El Gran Combo performing there. From late 2007 until the club reopened in 2011, the club was sharing space with the Columbus 72 nightclub, which shares the same owners.

In April 2010, the club owners were approved for a liquor license to operate the club in a new location at 760–766 8th Avenue, on the second and third floors. In November 2010, the club owners were granted permission to allow dancing by restaurant patrons as well as the general public, not limited to private parties and catered events. On July 12, 2011, the club re-opened to the public in Times Square at 268 West 47th Street. The first performer at the new location was world-renowned salsa musician Willie Colón.

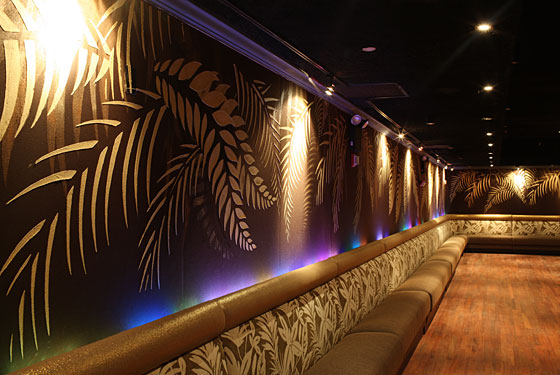
Inside the club in 2011

On May 26, 2020, the club announced that it had closed due to the COVID-19 pandemic, and that it planned to reopen in 2021 at another location. It eventually reopened in February 2022 at 625 West 51st Street under the direction of Ruben Cabrera.

== Outside New York City ==
A second Copacabana—the first outside New York—was readied for a grand opening in Fort Lauderdale, Florida, on September 13, 2012, in the historic Las Olas District at 219 S. Andrews Avenue. On January 24, 2013, the location closed.

== See also ==
- Copa Room, now-defunct Las Vegas nightclub at the Sands Hotel
- Latin Quarter, competitor with a similar history
