= Saujil, Tinogasta =

Coordinates: 27°34′S 67°37′W

Saujil (Tinogasta)
- Municipality and village
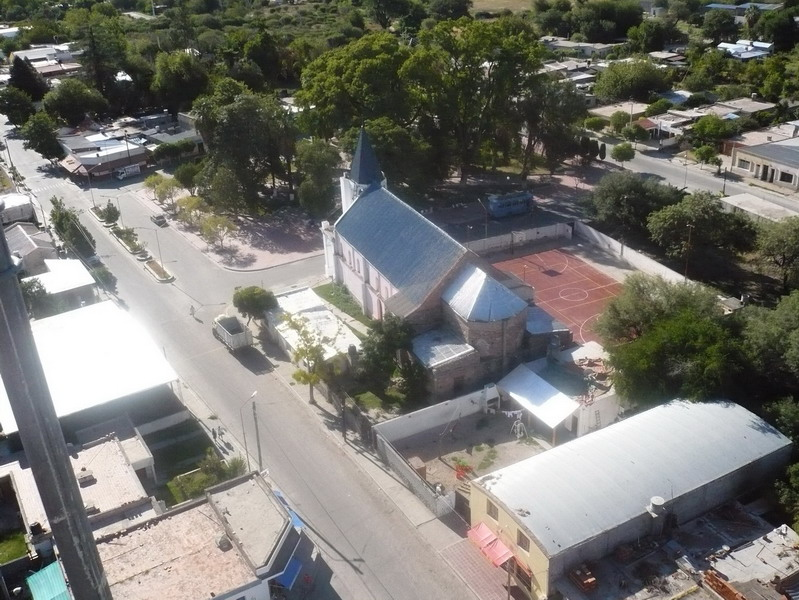
- Interactive map of Saujil (Tinogasta)
- Country: Argentina
- Province: Catamarca Province
- Department: Tinogasta Department
- Elevation: 5,299 ft (1,615 m)

Population
  - Total: 320
- Time zone: UTC−3 (ART)
- postal code: K5341
- Area code: 03837

Saujil (Tinogasta) is a village and municipality in Catamarca Province, in northwestern Argentina. Saujil translates as "illuminated place" in the indigenous Cacán language.
