= Cordobita =

Coordinates: 28°18′S 67°13′W

- Municipality and village
- Interactive map of Cordobita
- Country: Argentina
- Province: Catamarca Province
- Department: Tinogasta
- Time zone: UTC−3 (ART)

Cordobita is a village and municipality within the Tinogasta Department of Catamarca Province in northwestern Argentina.
