= Banda de Lucero =

Coordinates: 28°10′34″S 67°28′08″W

- Municipality and village
- Interactive map of Banda de Lucero
- Country: Argentina
- Province: Catamarca Province

Population (2010)
  - Total: 268
- Time zone: UTC−3 (ART)

Banda de Lucero is a village and municipality in Catamarca Province in northwestern Argentina, and is located in the Tinogasta Department.
