= Swing Street =

Studio album by Barry Manilow
- Released: November 1987
- Recorded: 1987
- Studio: Ocean Way Recording (Hollywood, California); Westlake Audio, Image Recording Studios and Record Plant (Los Angeles, California); Sigma Sound Studios, Clinton Recording Studios and The Hit Factory (New York City, New York); Criteria Studios (Miami, Florida)
- Genre: Pop; Easy listening
- Length: 39:00
- Label: Arista
- Producer: Barry Manilow; Eddie Arkin; Emilio & The Jerks

Barry Manilow chronology
| Manilow (1985) | Swing Street (1987) | Barry Manilow (1989) |

Professional ratings
Review scores
| Source | Rating |
|---|---|
| AllMusic | 2/5 stars |
| The Rolling Stone Album Guide | 1.5/5 stars |

Swing Street is the twelfth studio album by composer and singer Barry Manilow, released in 1987. Three of the tracks on the album featured Manilow in a duet with another singer. The tracks were recorded at various locations. This album marks Manilow's return to the Arista Records label from RCA Records, where he had two releases from 1985 to 1986 including Manilow and the soundtrack for the musical film Copacabana. The title of the album refers to 52nd Street in Manhattan, between 5th and 6th Avenues, which was the jazz mecca during the late 1930s and early 1940s. The album's first single, "Brooklyn Blues", was released to adult contemporary radio on October 26, 1987.

== Track listing ==
=== Side 1 - 8:00pm ===
1. "Swing Street" (Eddie Arkin, Barry Manilow, Roy Freeland) - 3:33
2. "Big Fun" (with Full Swing) (Arkin, Lorraine Feather) - 3:54
3. "Stompin' at the Savoy" (Benny Goodman, Chick Webb, Edgar Sampson, Andy Razaf, Manilow) - 2:40
4. "Black and Blue" (with Phyllis Hyman & Tom Scott) (Manilow, Tom Kelly, Adrienne Anderson) - 4:01
5. "Hey Mambo" (with Kid Creole and the Coconuts) (Manilow, Kelly, Bruce Sussman, Jack Feldman) - 2:52

=== Side 2 - Midnight ===
1. "Summertime" (with Diane Schuur & Stan Getz) (George Gershwin, DuBose Heyward) - 4:14
2. "Brooklyn Blues" (with Tom Scott) (Manilow, Sussman, Feldman) - 5:07
3. "Stardust" (with Uncle Festive) (Hoagy Carmichael, Mitchell Parish) - 5:19
4. "Once When You Were Mine" (Manilow, Anderson) - 2:49
5. "One More Time" (with Gerry Mulligan) (Manilow, Kelly, Sussman, Feldman) - 4:10

== Personnel ==
- Barry Manilow – vocals, vocal arrangements (3), arrangements (4–8), acoustic piano (7, 10), acoustic piano solo (8)
- Eddie Arkin – all keyboards (1–3), arrangements (1–4, 7, 9), horn arrangements (1–3), keyboards (4, 7), additional backing vocals (5)
- Kid Creole and the Coconuts – instruments and vocals (5)
- Artie Butler – acoustic piano (6), arrangements (6)
- Gregg Karukas – synthesizer programming (6)
- Ron Padley – acoustic piano (8, 10)
- Randy Kerber – acoustic piano (9)
- Dann Huff – guitars (1, 4)
- Paul Jackson Jr. – guitars (2, 7)
- John Pondel – guitars (8, 10)
- Dave Stone – bass (6)
- Marc Levine – bass (8, 10)
- Vinnie Colaiuta – drums (3)
- Alan Estes – percussion (2, 4, 7, 9)
- Bud Harner – additional percussion (2), drums (8, 10)
- Tom Scott – soprano saxophone (4), tenor saxophone (7), flute (9)
- Stan Getz – tenor saxophone (6)
- Gerry Mulligan – baritone saxophone (10)
- Charles Loper – horns (1–3)
- Bill Reichenbach Jr. – horns (1–3)
- Gary Grant – horns (1–3)
- Larry Hall – horns (1–3)
- Jerry Hey – horns (1–3), muted trumpet solo (1), horn arrangements (1–3, 5), flugelhorn (7)
- Charlotte Crossley – vocals (2)
- Lorraine Feather – vocals (2)
- Augie Johnson – vocals (2)
- Phyllis Hyman – vocals (4)
- Lawrence Dermer – additional backing vocals (5), arrangements (5)
- Joe Galdo – additional backing vocals (5), arrangements (5)
- Diane Schuur – vocals (6)
- Gary Falcone – backing vocals (7)
- Jon Joyce – backing vocals (7)
- Joe Pizzulo – backing vocals (7)

== Production ==
- Eric Borenstein – executive producer
- Barry Manilow – producer
- Eddie Arkin – producer (1–5, 7)
- Emilio & The Jerks – producers (5)
- Mark Larson – art direction
- Dave Brubaker – design
- Greg Gorman – photography
- Marc Hulett – poster design, personal assistant
- Ron Oates – set designer, set construction
- Martine Leger – stylist
- Alfonso Noe – grooming

Technical

- Michael DeLugg – digital mastering at Frankford/Wayne Mastering Labs (New York City, New York), mixing (1–4, 6, 9), Phyllis Hyman vocal recording (4), August Darnell vocal recording (5)
- Harry Maslin – recording (1, 3, 4, 7)
- Michael Braunstein – recording (2, 6, 8, 10)
- John Van Nest – recording (2), soprano sax recording (4), tenor sax recording (7), mixing (7)
- Eric Schilling – recording (5), mixing (5)
- Allen Sides – mixing (8, 10), recording (9)
- Ed Rak – baritone sax recording (10)
- Spencer Chrislu – assistant engineer (1, 3, 4, 7)
- Jay Healy – assistant engineer (1, 4, 6)
- Ron DaSilva – assistant engineer (2)
- Bruce Wildstein – assistant engineer (2, 8–10)
- Squeak Stone – assistant engineer (3, 7, 9)
- Dana Lynn Horowitz – assistant engineer (5)
- Teresa Verplanck – assistant engineer (5)
- Allen Abrahamson – assistant engineer (6)
- Rebecca Everett – assistant engineer (10)
- Mark Germain – assistant engineer (10)
