= Martin and Lewis (film) =

2002 television film directed by John Gray

- Print ad
- Based on: Everybody Loves Somebody Sometime (Especially Himself) by Arthur Marx
- Written by: John Gray
- Directed by: John Gray
- Starring: Jeremy Northam; Sean Hayes; Paula Cale; Sarah Manninen; Kate Levering
- Music by: Ernest Troost
- Country of origin: United States
- Original language: English

Production
- Executive producers: Neil Meron; Mark Sennet; John Stamos
- Producers: Mark Winemaker; Dave Mace
- Cinematography: Derick V. Underschultz
- Editor: Keith Reamer
- Running time: 92 minutes
- Production companies: Sony Pictures Television; St. Amos Productions; Storyline Entertainment

Original release
- Network: CBS
- Release: November 24, 2002

Martin and Lewis is a 2002 American made-for-television biographical film written and directed by John Gray, exploring the lives of the comedy team of Martin and Lewis. The film stars Jeremy Northam as Dean Martin and Sean Hayes as Jerry Lewis. It premiered on November 24, 2002, on CBS.

== Plot ==
The film begins in the mid-1940s with both men struggling to establish themselves in show business. Jerry Lewis, an anxious but ambitious young comic encouraged by his wife Patti and agent Abby Greshler, accepts work as master of ceremonies at New York's Havana-Madrid nightclub despite his fear of performing. There he encounters nightclub singer Dean Martin, a charismatic performer attempting to rebuild his career after financial hardship and bankruptcy while supported by his friend and manager Lou Perry.

When Jerry's engagement at Atlantic City's 500 Club proves unsuccessful, he persuades Lou Perry to convince Dean to join him for a one-week engagement. Although Dean initially insists he is a solo performer, their first performance together is an unexpected triumph, with their spontaneous improvisation and contrasting personalities creating a unique comedy act. Realizing they have discovered something special, they officially form the Martin and Lewis partnership.

The pair quickly become one of America's most successful entertainment acts, progressing from nightclubs to radio, television, and a lucrative contract with Paramount Pictures under producer Hal Wallis. Despite Jerry's disappointing screen test for My Friend Irma, Wallis reshapes the film to showcase his distinctive comic persona, launching the duo as film stars. Their popularity continues to grow through successful motion pictures, television appearances on The Colgate Comedy Hour, and sold-out nightclub performances.

As their fame increases, the partners' sharply different personalities begin to strain their relationship. Jerry is intensely ambitious, insecure, and determined to expand creatively as a writer, performer, and filmmaker, while Dean adopts a relaxed, detached attitude toward success, preferring simply to entertain. Jerry struggles with guilt over infidelity and unresolved feelings toward his father, whereas Dean becomes involved with Jeanne Biegger, leading to the collapse of his marriage to Betty. Although Jerry increasingly regards Dean as the brother he never had, Dean resists emotional intimacy, insisting that no one truly knows him.

Professional tensions also intensify. Jerry assumes greater creative control over their films and performances, often overshadowing Dean, whose contributions are increasingly dismissed by critics as those of a mere straight man. Jeanne encourages Dean to pursue a solo career, arguing that Jerry is holding him back, while Jerry's wife Patti warns him that Dean cannot reciprocate the deep friendship Jerry desires. Dean also grows frustrated when Jerry influences creative decisions, including reducing Dean's musical numbers in their films despite Dean's success as a recording artist.

The partnership deteriorates further during the production of 3 Ring Circus, where creative disagreements erupt into open hostility. Talent agent Lew Wasserman reminds the pair that "Martin and Lewis" has become a multimillion-dollar enterprise whose commitments must be honored regardless of their personal feelings, but their resentment continues to grow. During a live television performance of Colgate, Jerry's increasingly aggressive improvisation pushes Dean to his limit, and after a heated confrontation Dean declares their partnership finished.

Martin and Lewis fulfill their remaining obligations and perform one final engagement at New York's Copacabana nightclub in 1956. Following an emotional rendition of "Side by Side", entertainer Jackie Gleason pleads with the audience and the duo to reconsider the breakup. After the performance, Dean quietly thanks Jerry "for a great ride," and the two exchange expressions of affection before Dean walks away, ending one of the most successful comedy partnerships in American entertainment.

== Cast ==
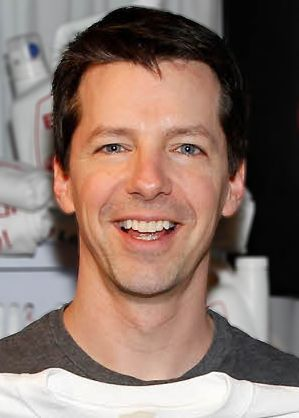
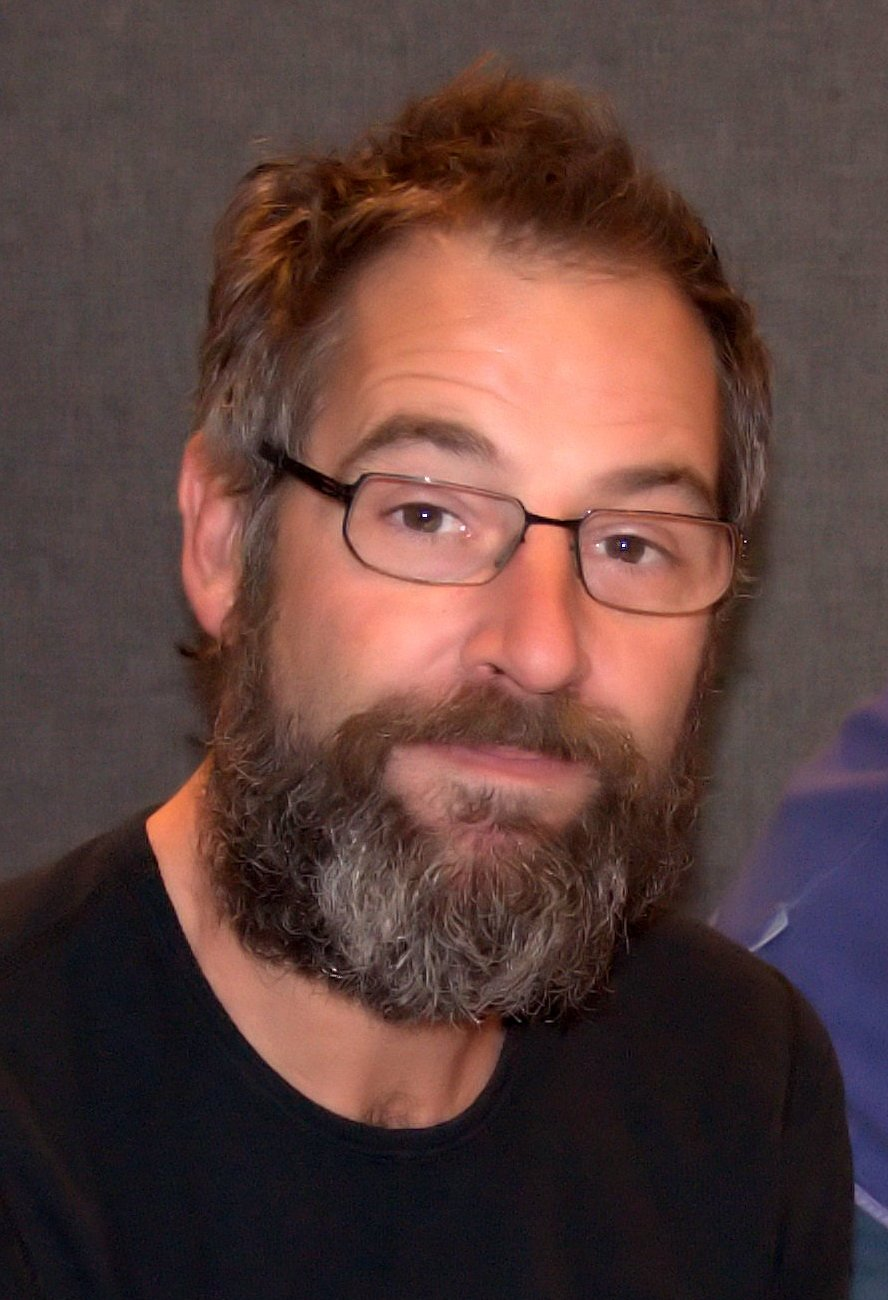
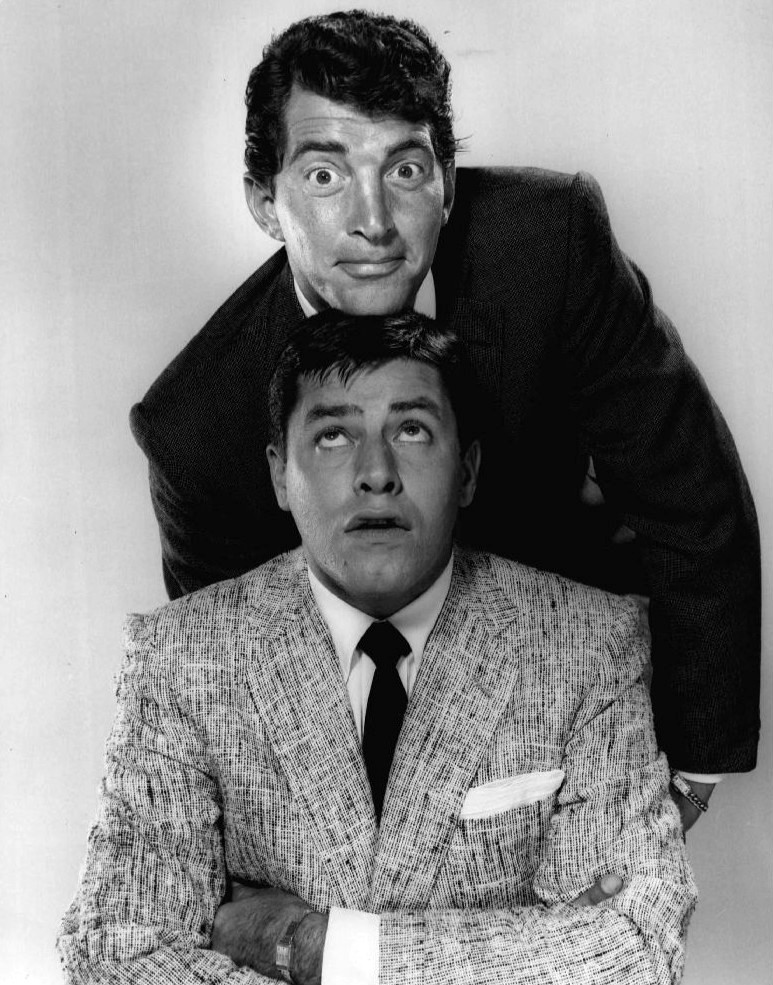
Sean Hayes (left) and Jeremy Northam (right) portray Jerry Lewis and Dean Martin respectively.
- Sean Hayes as Jerry Lewis
- Jeremy Northam as Dean Martin
- Paula Cale as Betty Martin
- Sarah Manninen as Patti Lewis
- Kate Levering as Jeanne Martin
- Scott McCord as Abby Greshler

Also featured in supporting roles are Steve Brinder as Danny Lewis, Conrad Dunn as Lou Perry, Bill Lake as Hal Wallis, David Eisner as Lew Wasserman, Robert Morelli as Skinny D'Amato and Markus Parilo as Irwin Woolfe. Sean Cullen makes an appearance in the film as comedian Jackie Gleason, who appears as an audience member at the duo's final performance at the Copacabana nightclub.

== Production ==
=== Writing ===
In real life, Dean Martin was married to Jeanne Biegger in 1949, many years before the breakup of his professional partnership with Jerry Lewis.

The film is based on the book, Everybody Loves Somebody Sometime (Especially Himself): The Story of Dean Martin and Jerry Lewis by Arthur Marx.

== Reception ==
=== Awards ===
- Art Directors Guild Excellence in Production Design Award – Television Movie or Mini-Series (nominated)
- Broadcast Film Critics Association Award for Best Picture Made for Television (nominated)
- C.A.S. Award for Outstanding Sound Mixing for Television – MOW's and Mini-Series (nominated)
- Golden Reel Award for Best Sound Editing in Television Long Form – Music (nominated)
- Primetime Emmy Award for Outstanding Music Composition for a Miniseries, Movie, or Special (Dramatic Underscore) (nominated)
- Screen Actors Guild Award for Outstanding Performance by a Male Actor in a Television Movie or Miniseries - Sean Hayes (nominated)
