= Norman Maen =

Norman Maen (1932 – 22 April 2008, born "Norman Maternaghan") was a director and choreographer.

== Personal life ==
Maen was born in Ballymena, Northern Ireland and began his career working as a dancer in Patricia Mulholland's Irish dancing school. He qualified as a teacher after successfully completing his studies at Ballymena Academy and Stranmillis College, Belfast.

== Career ==
After qualifying in teaching, he moved to Vancouver, British Columbia, Canada where he worked with the Alan Lund Dancers on a weekly television series which starred Robert Goulet. Later, he went on to Broadway as a principal dancer for Jack Cole. Soon after, he returned to Ireland to become the station choreographer for RTÉ for three years. In 1963, he hired eight dancers to become The Norman Maen Dancers and invited television and theatre producers to an audition in London where he was offered four different offers. One of these led to his involvement with the television series This is Tom Jones for four series where he worked with celebrities such as Liza Minnelli and Juliet Prowse and won his Emmy award. He is most remembered for his Swine Lake sequence on The Muppet Show which featured Rudolf Nureyev dancing with a giant pig. During this series he worked with Minnelli and Prowse again as well as numerous others including Julie Andrews, Gene Kelly and Ethel Merman.

One of his other well-remembered works is his version of Claude Debussy's Prélude à l'après-midi d'un faune for Olympic champion skater John Curry.

Other notable works include twelve years as choreographer for the Royal Variety Performance, musical theatre in Dublin (including Finian's Rainbow and The Fantasticks) and the West End (including Houdini, Thomas and The King, Irene, The Travelling Music Show and the OEEC Gala at Drury Lane).

He choreographed Les Demoiselles de Rochefort with music by Michel Legrand and direction by Jacques Demy, giving him the opportunity to work with Kelly again plus Catherine Deneuve, George Chakiris, Françoise Dorléac and Grover Dale.
