= Costa de Reyes =

- Municipality and village
- Map of Costa de Reyes within Argentina
- Coordinates: 28°18′S 67°40′W
- Country: Argentina
- Province: Catamarca Province
- Department: Tinogasta
- Time zone: UTC−3 (ART)

Costa de Reyes is a village and municipality within the Tinogasta Department of Catamarca Province in northwestern Argentina.
