= Grover Dale =

American actor, dancer and choreographer (born 1935)

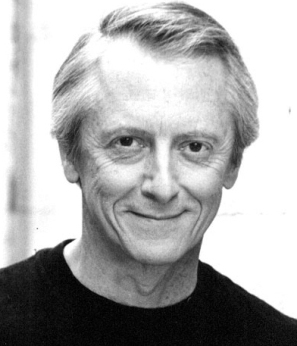
- Dale in 1980
- Born: July 22, 1935 (age 90); Harrisburg, Pennsylvania, U.S.
- Occupations: Actor; dancer; choreographer; theater director; publisher
- Years active: 1953–2010
- Spouse: Anita Morris (m. 1973; died 1994)
- Partner: Anthony Perkins (1964–1971)
- Children: James Badge Dale

Grover Dale (born July 22, 1935) is an American actor, dancer, choreographer, theater director, and publisher.

== Early life ==
Dale was born on July 22, 1935, in Harrisburg, Pennsylvania, to Emma D. (Ammon) and Ronald D. Aitken, a restaurateur. He studied dance with Lillian Jasper in McKeesport from 1945 to 1950. Partnering up with another dancer (Mary Lou Steele) in an aggressive rendition of "Slaughter On Tenth Avenue", he secured multiple performance opportunities in local nightclubs before getting his first professional job with the Pittsburgh Civic Light Opera in 1953.

== Career ==
Dale's Broadway stage debut was in the 1956 musical Li'l Abner as a dancer. He appeared in the original cast of West Side Story as Snowboy, a member of the Jets gang. Other stage credits include the role of Andrew in Greenwillow, in which he also understudied Anthony Perkins as Gideon Briggs; Noël Coward's Sail Away, where he had the juvenile lead role of architect Barnaby Slade; and in Half a Sixpence, where he played Pearce, one of a quartet of 19th century London shop apprentices around whom the show is structured.

Dale made his film debut in The Unsinkable Molly Brown (as Jam). He also appeared in Half a Sixpence (Pearce), The Young Girls of Rochefort (Bill), and The Landlord (Oscar).

Dale was nominated for the Tony Award twice: for his choreography of Billy, a 1969 musical version of the Herman Melville novella, Billy Budd, and his direction of The Magic Show. As co-director of Jerome Robbins' Broadway, he shared Best Director Tony Award with the famed director-choreographer Jerome Robbins. He also received an Emmy Award nomination for his choreography of Barry Manilow's 1985 television musical Copacabana. In 1992 he became publisher/editor of Dance & Fitness magazine. In 1999 Dale founded the website, Answers4Dancers.com, whose stated goal is "to empower dancers and choreographers to think, to grow, and to create satisfying careers for themselves..."

== Personal life ==
Dale was involved in a six-year relationship with actor Anthony Perkins before separating in 1971. In 1973, he married actress and dancer Anita Morris, with whom he had a son, actor James Badge Dale (born 1978). Dale and Morris remained together until her death in 1994.

== Filmography ==
=== Film ===
Year	Title	Role	Notes
1964	The Unsinkable Molly Brown	Jam	
1967	The Young Girls of Rochefort	Bill	
1967	Half a Sixpence	Pearce	
1970	The Landlord	Oscar	
1973	A Name for Evil	—N/a	Choreographer
1973	The Way We Were	—N/a	Choreographer
1981	So Fine	—N/a	Choreographer
1986	Quicksilver	—N/a	Choreographer
1987	Aria	—N/a	Choreographer
1997	Meet Wally Sparks	Dancer	

=== Television ===
Year	Title	Role	Notes
1956	Producers' Showcase	—N/a	Episode: "The Lord Don't Play Favorites"
1985	Copacabana	—N/a	Choreographer
2000	The Wonderful World of Disney	Resident of Idyllia	Episode: "Geppetto"

== Stage productions ==
- 1955 The Amazing Adele musical (dancer)
- 1956 Li'l Abner (dancer)
- 1957 West Side Story (actor)
- 1960 Greenwillow (actor)
- 1961 Sail Away (actor)
- 1965 Half a Sixpence (actor)
- 1969 Billy (choreographer)
- 1970 Jesus Christ Superstar (choreographer)
- 1973 Seesaw (choreographer)
- 1973 Rachael Lily Rosenbloom (show doctor)
- 1974 Seven Brides For Seven Brothers (show doctor)
- 1974 The Magic Show (director, choreographer)
- 1979 King of Schnorrers (director, choreographer)
- 1988 Mail (choreographer)
- 1989 Jerome Robbins' Broadway (co-director)

== Awards and nominations ==
Institution	Category	Year	Work	Result
Drama Desk Awards	Outstanding Choreography	1969	Billy	Won
Drama Desk Awards	Outstanding Choreography	1988	Mail	Nominated
Drama-Logue Awards	Outstanding Choreography	1973	—N/a	Nominated
Lester Horton Awards	Lifetime Achievement	1980	—N/a	Won
Primetime Emmy Awards	Outstanding Achievement in Choreography	1986	Copacabana	Nominated
Tony Awards	Best Choreography	1970	Billy	Nominated
Tony Awards	Best Direction of a Musical	1975	The Magic Show	Nominated
