= The Young Girls of Rochefort =

1967 film by Jacques Demy

- Theatrical release poster
- French: Les Demoiselles de Rochefort
- Directed by: Jacques Demy
- Written by: Jacques Demy
- Produced by: Gilbert de Goldschmidt
- Starring: Catherine Deneuve; George Chakiris; Françoise Dorléac; Michel Piccoli; Jacques Perrin; Grover Dale; Geneviève Thénier; Gene Kelly; Danielle Darrieux
- Cinematography: Ghislain Cloquet
- Edited by: Jean Hamon
- Music by: Michel Legrand
- Production companies: Madeleine Films; Parc Film
- Distributed by: Comacico
- Release date: 8 March 1967 (France)
- Running time: 126 minutes
- Country: France
- Language: French
- Budget: $1.1 million
- Box office: $8 million

The Young Girls of Rochefort (French: Les Demoiselles de Rochefort, lit. 'The Young Ladies of Rochefort' or 'The Damsels of Rochefort'') is a 1967 French musical romantic comedy film written and directed by Jacques Demy. The ensemble cast is headlined by real-life sisters Catherine Deneuve and Françoise Dorléac, and features George Chakiris, Michel Piccoli, Jacques Perrin, Grover Dale, Geneviève Thénier, Gene Kelly and Danielle Darrieux.

Michel Legrand composed the score for the film, to Demy's lyrics. The most famous songs from the film are "A Pair of Twins" ("Chanson des Jumelles") and Maxence's Song ("Chanson de Maxence"), which was later relyricized by Alan and Marilyn Bergman as "You Must Believe in Spring". The dance sequences were choreographed by Norman Maen.

The film was a success for Demy in his native France, with 1.32 million admissions, and was nominated for the Academy Award for Best Scoring of a Musical Picture — Original or Adaptation at the 41st Academy Awards.

A stage musical based on the film was produced in France in 2003, adapted by Alain Boublil and directed by Daniel Moyne.

== Plot ==
On a Friday morning, a caravan of trucks arrives in the French seaside town of Rochefort, on the Bay of Biscay, bringing the fair that will take place in the town square that Sunday. Étienne and Bill, two carnival workers who sell motorcycles, bicycles, and boats, help set up, while, in an apartment, Delphine teaches ballet to a group of children and her fraternal twin sister, Solange, accompanies the dancers on piano. The twins live in Rochefort, but long to find their ideal loves and move to Paris, Delphine to dance and Solange to compose.

Yvonne, the mother of the twins, has a café in the town square. Among her regular customers is Maxence, a sailor who sees himself primarily as a painter and poet searching the world for his ideal woman. A painting he did of what he imagines this woman to look like is on display at the art gallery owned by Delphine's egotistical boyfriend, Guillaume Lancien, and Delphine sees it when she goes there to break off the relationship. As it looks remarkably like her, she wants to meet the artist, but Guillaume lies and tells her the painter just left for Paris.

Delphine tells Solange about the artist and they decide to finally move to Paris. Solange goes to see Simon Dame at his music shop to ask him to arrange an introduction to his old friend, successful American composer Andy Miller, who is currently doing a series of recitals in Paris. While she is there, Simon tells her about his romantic past with a woman who bore his child, but left him because she could not stand his last name. He says he recently came back to Rochefort to open the shop because that is where he met the woman, though, as far as he knows, she is now in Mexico. Later, Yvonne tells Maxence the story of her relationship with the father of her young son, Booboo, indicating she regrets leaving the man just because she did not want to become "Madame Dame".

When picking up Booboo from school, Solange bumps into a charming foreigner, and they are immediately smitten with each other. The man is Andy, who has come to Rochefort to visit Simon during a break in his tour, but he and Solange part without exchanging names. After she is gone, he notices she dropped the sheet music for part of a piano concerto that she had composed and picks it up.

Étienne and Bill's girlfriends run away with a couple of sailors, which is hurtful both personally and professionally, since the women were supposed to dance at Étienne and Bill's stand at the fair to attract customers. Having gotten to know Yvonne, they think of asking her daughters to help them out, in exchange for a free ride to Paris.

The twins perform at the fair to enthusiastic applause. Guillaume says he will make Delphine a star in Paris if she gets back together with him, but she turns him down. Simon tells Solange that Andy has agreed to meet her in Paris. Étienne and Bill say they love Delphine and Solange, but the twins rebuff them, though without losing their ride.

On Monday morning, Simon comes by the twins' apartment. He tells Solange to go to his shop to see Andy, who is unexpectedly back in town for a short time, and agrees to pick up Booboo from school so she can do so. Maxence says goodbye to Yvonne at the café and then leaves for Paris to be an artist and continue to search for his ideal woman. After he leaves Delphine enters and, while bidding her mother farewell, mentions that a man named "Simon Dame" is getting Booboo. Yvonne leaves abruptly and reunites with Simon at Booboo's school.

At the music shop, Solange finds Andy playing her concerto, and the pair dance and kiss. Delphine asks Étienne and Bill to wait for Solange, but it is past time to leave, so the group departs without her. Along the way, the fair caravan passes Maxence hitchhiking, and Étienne stops to pick him up, finally bringing Delphine and Maxence together (though their meeting is not shown onscreen).

== Cast ==
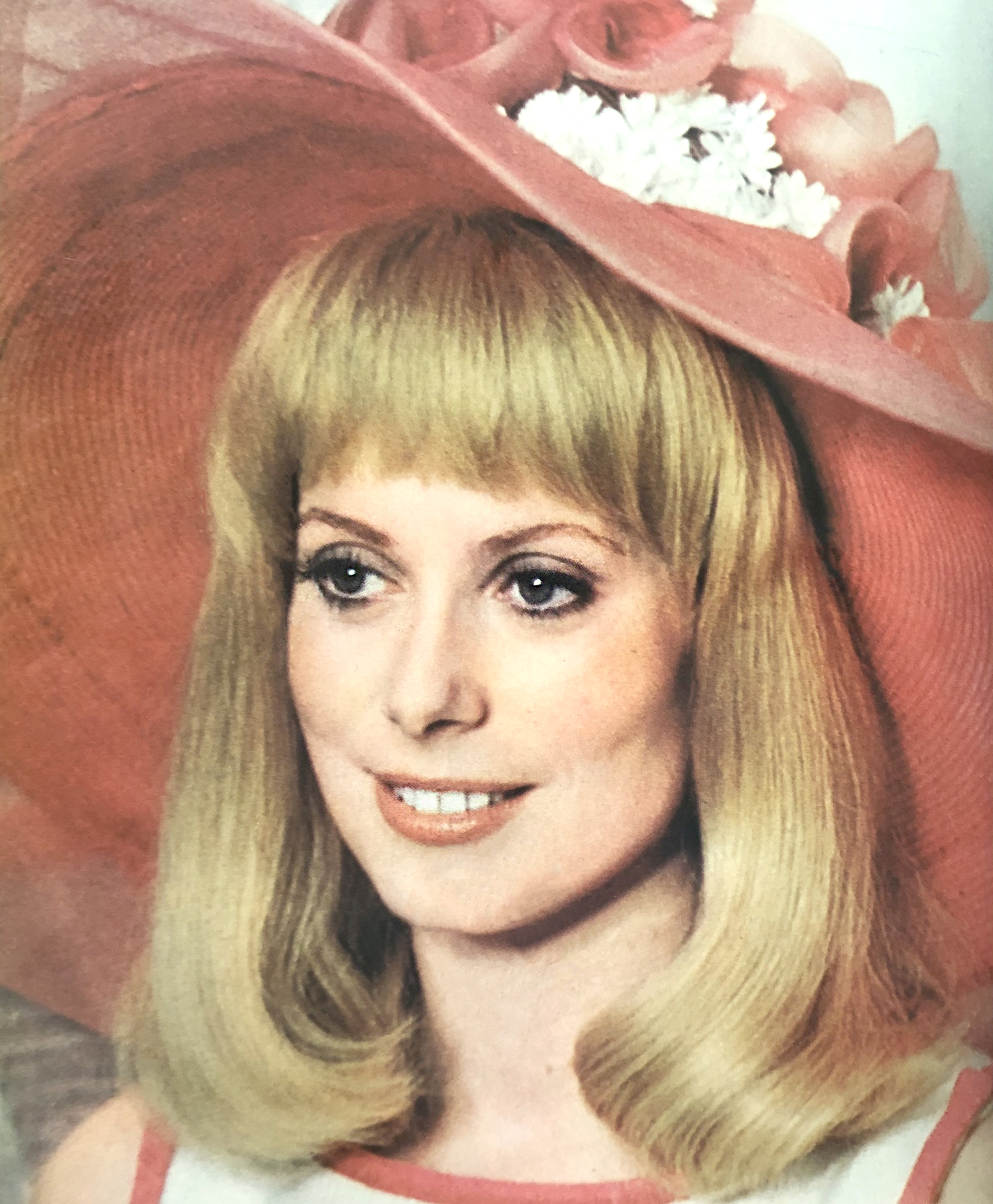
Catherine Deneuve as Delphine

- Catherine Deneuve as Delphine Garnier
- George Chakiris as Etienne
- Françoise Dorléac as Solange Garnier
- Jacques Perrin as Maxence
- Michel Piccoli as Simon Dame
- Jacques Riberolles as Guillaume Lancien
- Grover Dale as Bill
- Geneviève Thénier as Josette
- Henri Crémieux as Subtil Dutrouz
- Pamela Hart as Judith
- Leslie North as Esther
- Patrick Jeantet as Booboo
- Gene Kelly as Andy Miller
- Danielle Darrieux as Yvonne Garnier
- René Pascal (as René Bazart) as Grandpa

=== Singing voices ===
- Anne Germain as Delphine Garnier
- Claude Parent as Solange Garnier
- Christiane Legrand as Judith
- Claudine Meunier as Esther
- Alice Herald as Josette
- José Bartel as Bill
- Romuald as Etienne
- Donald Burke as Andy Miller
- Olivier Bonnet as Booboo
- Georges Blaness as Simon Dame
- Jacques Revaux as Maxence
- Gene Merlino as Guillaume Lancien

=== English singing voices ===
- Sue Allen as Delphine Garnier
- Jackie Ward as Solange Garnier
- Diana Lee as Judith
- Earl Brown as Maxence
- Gene Merlino as Guillaume Lancien
- Bill Lee as Simon Dame (Simon Guillotine in english version)
- Gene Kelly as Andy Miller

=== English dub ===
- Bruce Johansen as Maxence
- Katy Vail as Josette
- Lee Payant as Simon Dame (Simon Guillotine in english version)
- Marc Smith as Guillaume Lancien
- Suzanne Avon as Yvonne Garnier
- Gene Kelly as Andy Miller
- Robert Braun as Subtil Dutrouz

== Production ==
=== Pre-recording ===
Of the lead actors, the only one whose own singing voice was used in the film is Danielle Darrieux. Even Gene Kelly, though he was well-known for his singing in other musicals and spoke French quite well, did not record his own songs. According to Michel Legrand, "[Kelly] had a short tessitura, only one octave. In Hollywood, where I often worked with him, he used to record with two other singers: one on his left for the low notes and one on his right for the high notes." English-speaking Canadian singer Don Burke recorded Kelly's vocal parts, singing in French with an American accent.

=== English version ===
An English-language version of the film with lyrics translated by Julian More was shot simultaneously with the French-language version. The English singing voices recorded in Los Angeles under the direction of Michel Legrand. The dialogues were recorded by the Parisian dubbing company Lingua Synchrone, under the direction of Richard Heinz.

According to George Chakiris, the English-language version was the one originally released in theaters in the United States, where it did not perform well. As of 2025, the English version has never been released on home video. Two video clips from the first part of the English-language film, the entire second part of the film and the entire soundtrack were found by fans.

== Songs and musical sequences ==
1. "Le pont transbordeur" ("The Ferry Bridge")
2. "Arrivée des Camionneurs ballet" ("Arrival of Truckers Ballet")
3. "Leçon de ballet" ("Ballet Lesson")
4. "Chanson des jumelles" ("Twins' Song", popularized as "A Pair of Twins") - Anne Germain, Claude Parent
5. "Chanson de Maxence" ("Maxence's Song", popularized as "You Must Believe in Spring") - Jacques Revaux
6. "De Delphine à Lancien" ("From Delphine to Lancien") - Anne Germain, Jacques Riberolles
7. "Nous voyageons de ville en ville" ("We Travel From City To City") - Romuald, José Bartel
8. "Chanson de Delphine" ("Delphine's Song", popularized as "You Must Believe in Spring") - Anne Germain
9. "Chanson de Simon" ("Simon's Song") - Georges Blaness
10. "Andy amoureux" ("Andy In Love") - Donald Burke
11. "Marins, amis, amants ou maris" ("Sailors, Friends, Lovers Or Husbands") - José Bartel, Anne Germain, Claude Parent
12. "Chanson d'Yvonne" ("Yvonne's Song") - Danielle Darrieux
13. "Chanson de Maxence Reprise" ("Maxence's Song Reprise") - Jacques Revaux
14. "Chanson de Solange" ("Solange's Song") - Claude Parent
15. "De Hambourg à Rochefort" ("From Hamburg To Rochefort") - Anne Germain, Claude Parent
16. "Chanson des jumelles" ("Twins' Song") - Anne Germain, Claude Parent, Romuald, José Bartel
17. "Lola Lola" - Danielle Darrieux
18. "Ballet de basketball" ("Basketball Ballet")
19. "La femme coupée en morceaux" ("Woman Cut Into Pieces")
20. "Les rencontres" ("The Meetings")
21. "Chanson d'Andy" ("Andy's Song")
22. "Kermesse"
23. "Chanson d'un jour d'été" ("Summer Day Song") - Anne Germain, Claude Parent
24. "Toujours, jamais" ("Always, Never") - Anne Germain, Claude Parent, Romuald, José Bartel
25. "Concerto ballet"
26. "Départ des forains ballet" ("Fairground Departure Ballet")
27. "Départ des camionneurs final" ("Truckers Departure Finale")

== Reception and legacy ==
The film was met with critical acclaim and is now regarded as one of the greatest movie musicals of all time. On review aggregator website Rotten Tomatoes, the film has an approval score of 98%, with an average rating of 8/10 based on 45 reviews. The site's critical consensus reads, "The Young Girls of Rochefort pays colorful homage to classic Hollywood musicals while earning its own emotionally affecting place of honor in the genre."

In a contemporaneous 1968 review, Renata Adler of The New York Times called the film, "the best musical in some time." Similarly, in 2022 David Ehrlich of IndieWire named it the 34th greatest movie musical of all time, deeming it, "A sneakily bittersweet masterpiece," and comparing it favorably to Demy's previous film, The Umbrellas of Cherbourg.

The film was voted the 185th greatest film of all time in the 2022 Sight and Sound poll.
