= Thomas and the King =

The London Production Poster

Thomas and the King is a stage musical with music by John Williams, lyrics by James Harbert, and a book by Edward Anhalt. It is based on the story of Thomas Becket and Henry II of England, and set in 12th century England. It opened at Her Majesty's Theatre London, 16 October 1975 to poor reviews and failed to make it to Broadway. The set was designed by Tim Goodchild. The musical was directed and choreographed by Norman Maen. The cast included James Smilie, Richard Johnson, Caroline Villiers, Martin McEvoy, and Dilys Hamlett.

== Synopsis ==
=== Act I ===
The story begins with a (Pilgrimage Procession), led by Queen Eleanor of Aquitaine on her way to Canterbury through a wooded area where King Henry II has been pursuing peasant wenches. Henry tries to encourage his friend Thomas Becket to join him (Look Around You). Thomas meets Jennie, a peasant girl who wants to better herself even though it means yielding her maidenhood to Henry. Left alone, she expresses her insecurities (Am I Beautiful?). Thomas warns Henry that Jennie is an intelligent girl, but this fails to discourage Henry. Thomas reprimands him for his ribaldry and reminds him that it is the King's responsibility to leave the world a better place. Henry prefers to be remembered as a (Man Of Love).

Theobold, Archbishop of Canterbury, challenges Thomas' inability to reform Henry's ways, which leads to a discussion between Henry and Thomas as to the true nature of love (The Question). In the palace, Queen Eleanor finds Jennie on her way to Henry's bedchamber and she tries to make Jennie unattractive to Henry by dressing her in a royal manner. Thomas suggests that Eleanor will have done Jennie a favour in keeping her from Henry's bed but Jennie is now unable to return to her village and her previous way of life (What Choice Have I?).

At a council meeting, in a challenge to the Archbishop, Henry makes Thomas the Lord Chancellor, bridging the gap between church and state. This is seen by Henry as a way to build a better England (We Shall Do It!). A jealous Eleanor reminds herself that she can handle Henry as well as Thomas and Jennie who has, in a gesture of both lust and ambition, come to Henry's bed again and he finds that feeling of affection for the peasant wench is (Improbable As Spring). Eleanor is a woman of (Power) and masterminds a war against France. The Archbishop is killed and Henry is defeated. Eleanor is delighted. However, to gain popularity again with the people of England Henry decides to make Thomas the new Archbishop of Canterbury. Thomas pleads with Henry to reconsider, realising that Henry will expect him to speak for the King rather than for the Church. But Henry says that he will go ahead with his plan but Thomas pledges that he will speak for God (The Question - Reprise).

=== Act II ===
The second act opens with the (Consecration) of Thomas as Archbishop of Canterbury, but Eleanor is plotting to bring Thomas to trial for his past misdeeds. While Eleanor has been otherwise engaged Henry has fallen in love with Jennie ('Tis Love). Henry will not allow Thomas to be tried by the Church Court but Thomas defies him by supporting the right of the Church in this matter and he goes to Rome to see the Pope.

In Rome the Cardinals are not kindly disposed towards Thomas and privately plot to have him excommunicated (Sincerity). The Pope is afraid that if he sends Thomas to England, Henry will invade Rome, so, exile is the only solution. Thomas ponders the challenge and the dichotomy with which he is now faced (The Test).

Back in England, Jennie suggests that Henry forgive Thomas (Replay The Game) and that they should try to build their dream for England (A New Way To Turn).

Thomas returns to England and he agrees to obey Henry in legal matters but not on Church matters. Unable to compromise, Henry realises that he will have to destroy Thomas in order to keep his kingdom (Will No One Rid Me?). While kneeling in prayer, Thomas is murdered. Henry finds that it is in death that Thomas has achieved martyrdom and, from his grief, Henry vows to build their dream for England (So Many Worlds - Finale).

== Musical numbers ==
- 1. Processional - Company
- 2. Look Around You - Henry, Becket and Village Girls
- 3. Am I Beautiful? - Jennie
- 4. Man Of Love - Henry
- 5. The Question - Becket and Henry
- 6. What Choice Have I? - Jennie and Becket
- 7. We Shall Do It! - Becket, Henry and Company
- 8. Improbable As Spring - Henry
- 9. Power - Eleanor and Foliot
- 10. Consecration of Becket - Company
- 11. 'Tis Love - Henry and Jennie
- 12. Sincerity - Two Cardinals
- 13. The Test - Becket
- 14. Replay the Game - Jennie
- 15. A New Way To Turn - Henry, Becket, Jennie and Company
- 16. Will No One Rid Me? - Henry, Eleanor, Jennie and Company
- 17. So Many Other Worlds - Finale

== Cast album ==
The musical (principal members) was recorded a few years after its West End production, with some of the original cast participating. Lewis Fiander sang the role of Thomas, with Michael Sammes as Bishop Foliot, Richard Day-lewis as Cardinal Rossini and Tom Saffery as Cardinal Resphigi. The album was recorded at PRT Studios, London 27/28 Aug 1981. The orchestrator for the musical was John Williams' regular collaborator Herbert W. Spencer.
