= Copacabana: Original London Cast Recording =

Copacabana

Cast recording by Barry Manilow
- Released: 1994
- Recorded: 1994
- Genre: Musical
- Label: Exallshow Ltd
- Producer: Barry Manilow and Stewart Mackintosh

Barry Manilow chronology
Greatest Hits: The Platinum Collection (1993)	Copacabana (1994)	Singin' with the Big Bands (1994)

Copacabana: Original London Cast Recording is the original cast album for the London show of Copacabana, a full-length West End musical that opened at the Prince of Wales Theatre on 23 June 1994. It ran for over two years, touring the UK for a further year.

== Track listing ==
(note: all songs written by Barry Manilow, Jack Feldman and Bruce Sussman. Songs with following asterisks are included in the 1985 CBS film.)

Act I

1. "Overture"* (This Can't Be Real―Night On The Town―Sweet Heaven―Who Needs To Dream?)
2. "Copacabana (At The Copa) (Opening Sequence)"
3. "Just Arrived"
4. "Dancin' Fool"
5. "Night On The Town"*‡
6. "Man Wanted"*
7. "Lola"*
8. "Who Needs To Dream?"*
9. "¡Aye Caramba!"*
10. "Bolero de Amor"

Act II

1. "Sweet Heaven (I'm In Love Again)"*
2. "Who Am I Kidding?"
3. "Who Am I Kidding? (Reprise)"
4. "This Can't Be Real"
5. "Welcome to Havana"
6. "The Mermaid's Tale"
7. "El Bravo"*
8. "Who Needs To Dream? (Reprise)"*
9. "Copacabana (At The Copa) (Finale)"*

‡= "Let's Go Steppin'" becomes "Night On The Town"
