= Copacabana, Catamarca =

Coordinates: 28°12′S 67°29′W

Copacabana
- Municipality and village
- Interactive map of Copacabana
- Country: Argentina
- Province: Catamarca Province
- Time zone: UTC−3 (ART)

Copacabana is a village and municipality in Catamarca Province in northwestern Argentina.
