= Copacabana (soundtrack) =

Copacabana: The Original Motion Picture Soundtrack Album

Soundtrack album by Barry Manilow
- Released: 1985
- Recorded: 1985
- Genre: Jazz, swing, pop
- Label: RCA

Barry Manilow chronology
| 2:00 AM Paradise Cafe (1984) | Copacabana: The Original Motion Picture Soundtrack Album (1985) | Manilow (1985) |

Copacabana: The Original Motion Picture Soundtrack Album is a 1985 soundtrack album by Barry Manilow released by RCA Records to accompany the made-for-television musical film Copacabana. It was Barry Manilow's first soundtrack that contained songs with music by him.

== Track listing ==
All tracks composed by Barry Manilow (music), Bruce Sussman and Jack Feldman (lyrics).

1. "Overture" – Orchestra - 1:22
2. "Copacabana (At the Copa)" – Barry Manilow - 1:24
3. "Let's Go Steppin'" – Chorus - 2:10
4. "Changing My Tune" – Barry Manilow - 3:12
5. "Blue" – Orchestra - 2:05
6. "Lola" – Barry Manilow - 1:16
7. "Who Needs to Dream" – Barry Manilow - 3:53
8. "Man Wanted" – Annette O'Toole - 1:35
9. "¡Aye Caramba!" – Chorus - 3:36
10. "Call Me Mr. Lucky" – Barry Manilow - 2:01
11. "Big City Blues" – Barry Manilow - 3:34
12. "Sweet Heaven (I'm in Love Again)" – Barry Manilow - 3:39
13. "El Bravo" – Annette O'Toole and Chorus - 6:17
14. "Copacabana (At the Copa) 1985" – Barry Manilow - 5:37
15. "Who Needs To Dream (Reprise)" – Barry Manilow - 1:45
16. "¡Aye Caramba! (Reprise)" – Barry Manilow - 4:38

== Notes ==
- The track "Blue" is an instrumental version and "Big City Blues" a piano/vocal version of two songs that Manilow originally recorded on the album 2:00 AM Paradise Cafe.

== Certifications ==
| Region | Certification | Certified units/sales |
|---|---|---|
| United Kingdom (BPI) | Silver | 60,000^{‡} |
^{‡} Sales+streaming figures based on certification alone.
