= Copacabana (1985 film) =

CBS television musical

- Genre: Musical; Romance; Comedy
- Based on: Characters from the song "Copacabana" by Barry Manilow, Bruce Sussman and Jack Feldman
- Written by: James Lipton
- Directed by: Waris Hussein
- Starring: Barry Manilow; Annette O'Toole; Estelle Getty; James T. Callahan
- Music by: Barry Manilow; Bruce Sussman; Jack Feldman
- Country of origin: United States
- Original language: English

Production
- Executive producers: Dick Clark; Dan Paulson
- Producer: R.W. Goodwin
- Cinematography: Bobby Byrne
- Editor: Michael Jablow
- Running time: 96 minutes
- Production company: Dick Clark Productions

Original release
- Network: CBS
- Release: December 3, 1985

Copacabana is a 1985 American made-for-television musical film based on the 1978 song of the same title by Barry Manilow, and starred Manilow himself, in his acting debut, as Tony, an aspiring songwriter, and Annette O'Toole as Lola, an aspiring singer who falls in with the wrong crowd.

The film premiered on CBS on December 3, 1985. At the 38th Primetime Emmy Awards, the film was nominated for Outstanding Achievement in Choreography (Grover Dale) and Outstanding Directing in a Variety or Music Program (Hussein), and won for the latter.

A soundtrack album, Copacabana: The Original Motion Picture Soundtrack Album, was released. The film also inspired a 1990 stage show at Caesars Atlantic City, as well as a 1994 musical of the same name.

== Plot ==
In 1948, aspiring singer Lola and songwriter Tony Starr meet while competing on a radio talent show. After obtaining a bartending job at the Copacabana nightclub, Tony, who was immediately smitten with Lola, helps her pursue a career in show business. Lola is later hired as a showgirl at the club, while Tony is promoted to a lounge pianist.

Their relationship is disrupted when Rico Castelli, owner of the Tropacana nightclub in Havana, offers Lola a position at his club. Following an argument with Tony, Lola accepts the offer and flies to Cuba. Tony later learns from his estranged father, a police officer, that Rico has a criminal record and was connected to the suspicious death of a former showgirl. He travels to Havana and persuades Lola to leave with him. The two escape from Rico's men and return to the United States, where they are married. Rico unexpectedly appears at their wedding dinner at the Copacabana, intending to kill them. During a struggle over a gun, Lola accidentally shoots Tony, killing him.

In 1978, the now-aged Lola patronizes the Copacabana, which has been converted into a discotheque. Wearing one of her old performance dresses and drinking heavily, she has a vision of a younger version of herself dancing with Tony.

== Cast ==
- Barry Manilow as Tony Starr
- Annette O'Toole as Lola Lamar
- Estelle Getty as Bella Stern
- James T. Callahan as Dennis Riley
- Andra Akers as Pamela Devereaux
- Silvana Gallardo as Conchita Alverez
- Joseph Bologna as Rico Castelli
- Ernie Sabella as Sam Gropper
- Cliff Osmond as Algelo
- Dwier Brown as Bibi Sutton
- Hamilton Camp as Nicky Richards
- Stanley Brock as 2nd Publisher
- Clarence Felder as Nick Panotis
- Artie Butler as Nightclub Piano Player

== Production ==
Dick Clark approached Manilow and cowriters Bruce Sussman and Jack Feldman, persuading them to develop a musical film around the song. Directed by Waris Hussein and written by James Lipton, the film features a handful of newly composed songs by Manilow.

=== Music ===
The soundtrack album was released by RCA Records.

Nine songs were written specifically for the film.

- "Sweet Heaven (I'm in Love Again)" - Tony
- "Changing My Tune" - Tony
- "Let's Go Steppin'" - Copa Girls
- "Man Wanted" - Lola
- "Call Me Mr. Lucky" - Tony
- "Lola" - Tony
- "Who Needs to Dream?" - Tony
- "¡Aye Caramba!" - Copa Girls
- "El Bravo" - Lola
