= Tinogasta Department =

Tinogasta Departamento Tinogasta
- Department
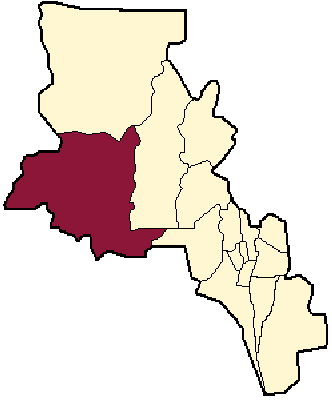
- location of Tinogasta Department in Catamarca Province
- Coordinates: 28°4′S 67°34′W
- Country: Argentina
- Established: ?
- Founder: ?
- Seat: Tinogasta

Government
  - Mayor: Hugo Ávila, FJ

Area
  - Total: 23,582 km^{2} (9,105 sq mi)

Population (2001 census [INDEC])
  - Total: 22,570
  - Density: 0.9571/km^{2} (2.479/sq mi)
- Demonym: tinogasteña/o
- Postal Code: K5340
- IFAM: CAT032
- Area Code: 03837
- Patron saint: ?
- Website: www.camsencat.gov.ar/tinogas.html

Tinogasta is a western department of Catamarca Province in Argentina.

The provincial subdivision has a population of about 22,500 inhabitants in an area of 23,582 km^{2} (9,105 sq mi), and its capital city is Tinogasta, which is located around 1,415 km (879 mi) from Buenos Aires.

== See also ==
- Copacabana
- Laguna Negra, Catamarca
