= Copacabana (musical) =

Musical

Barry Manilow's Copacabana
- Music: Barry Manilow
- Lyrics: Bruce Sussman; Jack Feldman
- Book: Barry Manilow; Jack Feldman; Bruce Sussman
- Productions: 1990 Atlantic City; 1994 West End; 2000 US Tour; 2009 US Regional; 2014 UK Tour

Copacabana, also known as Barry Manilow's Copacabana, is a 1994 stage musical with music by Barry Manilow, lyrics by Bruce Sussman and Jack Feldman, and book by Manilow, Sussman and Feldman. The show had its roots in an hour-long stage show, Barry Manilow Presents Copacabana, which played in Atlantic City in 1990 and 1991. The stage show was based on the 1985 musical TV film of the same name, in turn based on Manilow's 1978 hit song of the same title, which was co-written by Manilow, Sussman and Feldman. The full-length musical, which added a present-day framing device and many additional songs, premiered in the United Kingdom in 1994 and later toured the United States. A cast album of the musical was released in 1994, titled Copacabana: Original London Cast Recording.

== Atlantic City stage show (1990–1991) ==
Barry Manilow Presents Copacabana was an hour-long show for Caesars Circus Maximus Theatre in Atlantic City. It starred Sean Sullivan as Tony/Stephen and Hillary Turk as Lola. It ran from September 1990 to June 1991 and had a cast of 20 singers and dancers which Manilow directed, with a script and song score created by Manilow and his longtime collaborators Bruce Sussman and Jack Feldman. The song list and plot closely matched that of the 1985 TV movie. The show played to over 100,000 people in its first six months and received rave reviews as the "must-see casino show" in Atlantic City. Though in the TV movie the character of Lola was stated as being from Chicago, from this adaptation forward Lola was instead from Tulsa, Oklahoma.

Unreleased Barry Manilow Presents Copacabana Cast Recording

Side one

- "Overture" (from 1985 movie)
- "Just Arrived" (Note: Debuted in this version) – Lola
- "Dancin Fool" (Note: Song debuted in 1988 Big Fun on Swing Street CBS television special) – Copa Girls
- "Let's Go Steppin" – Copa Girls
- "Man Wanted" – Lola
- "Lola/Who Needs To Dream" – Tony
- "Copacabana (Writing Rico)" – Stephen
- "¡Aye Caramba!" – Copa Girls

Side two

- "Bolero de Amor" – Rico
- "Sweet Heaven (I'm In Love Again)" – Tony
- "Welcome To Havana" – Conchita
- "Mermaids Tale"
- "El Bravo" – Lola and Tropicana cast
- "Who Needs To Dream" (reprise)
- "Copa Finale"
- "Copacabana 1985" (Note: Sung by Barry Manilow)

== Stage musical UK (1994–1996) ==
In 1994, the one-hour show was expanded into a three million dollar full-length musical, with book by Manilow, Bruce Sussman and Jack Feldman, lyrics by Bruce Sussman and Jack Feldman, and music by Manilow. It premiered on March 21, 1994, at Theatre Royal in Plymouth, England. It also played Manchester, Edinburgh and then London's West End at the Prince of Wales Theatre from June 23, 1994 to September 9, 1996. It followed with a UK tour for an additional year.

This adaptation originally starred Gary Wilmot as Tony/Stephen and Nicola Dawn as Lola. It was Executive Produced by Adrian Leggett with Direction by Roger Redfarn, Choreography by Doriana Sanchez, Music Direction by Andy Rumble, Costumes Designed by Hugh Durrant, Scenic Design by Martin Grant, Projection Design by Chris Slingsby and Jon Turner, Sound Design by John Del Nero, Lighting Design by Hugh Vanstone with a Design Concept by Gary Withers/Imagination, Casting Director Anne Lonergan (now known as Anne Vosser).

An original cast album of this production was released, titled Copacabana: Original London Cast Recording.

== Stage musical US (2000) ==
The UK stage musical adaptation, also known as Barry Manilow's Copacabana: A New Musical Comedy, had its American premiere at Pittsburgh Civic Light Opera (Pittsburgh CLO) in 2000, followed by a run as part of the Dallas Summer Musical season. Direction was by David Warren with choreography by Wayne Cilento. Pittsburgh and Dallas were the first two engagements of a US national that ran from June 2000 through May 2001. The cast included Franc D'Ambrosio as Tony, Darcie Roberts as Lola, Terry Burrell as Conchita, Philip Hernandez as Rico, Beth McVey as Gladys and Gavin MacLeod (followed by Dale Radunz) as Sam.

== Other productions ==
The show was translated to Swedish and performed at Linneateatern in Växjö, Sweden in Autumn 2005. The songs were translated to Swedish by actor John Martin Bengtsson, who played Stephen/Tony in the show.

A new UK Tour began on October 2, 2014, but closed a month later after encountering financial difficulties. Directed by Thom Southerland, this production starred Jon Lee as Tony and Jennifer Harding as Lola.

The German version premiered in February 2016 at Landestheater Coburg with Andreas Langsch as Tony, Gero Wendorf as Stephen, Marcus G. Kulp as Rico and Julia Harneit as Lola. The songs were mostly kept in their original English version while all the dialogue was translated into German. In May 2017 this production also had a limited run at the Pfalzbau in Ludwigshafen.

== Original principal casts ==
Character	Atlantic City 1990	Original London Cast 1994	Original US Cast 2000–2001	PCLO Revival Cast 2009	UK Tour Cast 2014
Tony Forte/Stephen	Sean Sullivan	Gary Wilmot	Franc D'Ambrosio	Tony Yazbeck	Jon Lee
Lola La Mar/Samantha	Hillary Turk	Nicola Dawn	Darcie Roberts	Chandra Lee Schwartz	Jennifer Harding
Rico Castelli	Lou DeMeis	Richard Lyndon	Philip Hernandez	Robert Cuccioli	Ricky Johnson
Conchita Alvarez	Kay Freeman	Anna Nicholas	Terry Burrell	Elise Santora	Sharon Sexton
Sam Silver	Ronn Munro	Howard Attfield	Gavin MacLeod	Stephen Berger	Richard Grieve
Gladys Murphy	—N/a	Jenny Logan	Beth McVey	Sally Wilfert	Lucy Garrioch

== Synopsis ==
The story follows Stephen, a young aspiring songwriter, as he composes what he hopes will become a hit musical.

His imagination takes him back to 1947 as he creates a story surrounding an ambitious young singer Lola la Mar who arrives in New York City from Tulsa hoping to become a star. Meanwhile, Tony Forte, a 1947 incarnation of Stephen, is attempting to make it as a songwriter while tending bar at the famous Copacabana Nightclub. Tony instantly falls for Lola as she wanders into the Copacabana. He, along with former "Copa Girl" Gladys, introduce her to the owner of the club Sam Silver, to get her a job as a new Copa Girl. The two try to make it in New York in their respective fields, but do not find it easy. After Tony helps Lola improve a song written by her former music teacher, Sam gives her a job as a Copa Girl at his club. The two fall in love, as Tony writes a song for Lola as she listens.

Stephen's voice can be heard narrating the events as Rico Castelli, an Italian gangster from Cuba, enters the Copacabana with the now-waning star Conchita Alvarez. Sam confronts Rico about the disappearance of Copa Girls each time he comes to the club, and demands he leave. However, Rico, armed with thugs, is able to stay long enough to meet and develop an interest in Lola la Mar. He drugs her and flies her back to Havana, Cuba, to star in his own nightclub -the Tropicana.

In Havana, Rico informs Conchita that she will be replaced by a new, younger actress: Lola. Conchita, frustrated and upset, goes to Lola in order to "welcome" her. Back at the Copacabana, Tony, Sam, and Gladys learn that Lola was kidnapped and taken to Cuba. Tony immediately heads to save her, and Sam, after some convincing from Gladys, agrees to help him. Conchita, initially intending to threaten Lola, finds that she is truly a victim, and instead treats her with sympathy. Stephen can be seen again, this time expressing his love for the troubled Lola, while also sharing his lament for she is merely a figment of his imagination.

Tony and Sam, now in Cuba, find Conchita and asks her for her help. She agrees, and pretends to guide Lola to become her replacement, while telling her to play along. Near the end of the Tropicana performance of "El Bravo", Tony runs on stage, reunited with Lola once again. However, Rico is close behind, waving a gun, and points the barrel at Tony. A single gunshot is heard, and Rico falls to the floor. Conchita, saving Tony and Lola from the perils she faced for years, shot her love Rico to his death.

Tony and Lola are finally reunited and go back happily to the Copacabana.

Back in the present, Stephen has finished his song. His wife, Samantha, is urging him to dress for their anniversary dinner. Stephen realizes that Lola was simply an incarnation of his wife, and finds he has a new sense of love for her. Her parents, who were the base for the characters Sam and Gladys, also appear, and he realizes his imagination had simply morphed reality into something a bit more elaborate.

== Characters ==
The Present Day

- Stephen – A young songwriter, who doubles as Tony Forte in 1947
- Samantha – Stephen's wife, who doubles as Lola Lamar in 1947

1947

- Tony Forte – Young, good-looking and talented. A struggling songwriter by day, by night he works at the Copacabana.
- Lola Lamar – A young, pretty burlesque chorus girl with misguided ambitions to become a Broadway star.
- Gladys Murphy – A cheeky, warm-hearted cigarette girl at the Copacabana.
- Sam Silver – The gruff but kind manager of the Copacabana.
- Rico Castelli – An elegant but dangerous gangster who manages The Tropicana in Havana.
- Conchita Alvarez – A Latina bombshell of the first order and Rico's long-suffering partner/girlfriend.
- McManus – A New York cop of Irish descent.
- Willie – A waiter at the Copacabana.
- Carlos – A Tropicana performer
- Luis – Rico's enforcer and bodyguard
- Skip – The house choreographer at the Copacabana.
- Maitre D' – The Snooty Headwaiter/host of the Copacabana.
- Coat Check Girl – Works at the Copacabana.
- Piano Accompanist
- Messers Hammerstein, Rodgers, Lerner, Lowe – Audition Lola for musicals
- A Back-of-the-House Voice – Plays various show writers, producers, a record producer
- Mr. Brill – A music publisher
- Announcer – At The Tropicana
- Pirate Captain – At The Tropicana, in El Bravo
- x3 Bolero Couples
- Chorus – Show Girls, Show Boys, Copa Girls, Copa Boys, Tropicana Boys, Tropicana Girls, Copa Guests, Tropicana Guests, Mermaids, Pirates, Pirettes, Cops, Waiters, Busboys, Sailors, Fancy Gents, Thugs, Auditioners, Commuters, Porters, Rosie the Riveter, a Nurse, a WAC, a WAVE, a Salvation Army Sergeant
- Non-speaking roles – Music Publisher, Veronica Lake, Lake's Publicist

== Musical numbers ==
=== 1994 London version ===
Act I

- "Overture" — Orchestra

Scene 1: Somewhere in Stephen's Imagination, Present Day

- "Copa Opening" — Stephen, Company

Scene 2: Stephen's Studio, New York City, Present Day

Scene 3: Grand Central Station and Times Square, New York City, 1947

- "Just Arrived" — Lola, Women Hopefuls

Scene 4: Stephen's Studio, Present Day

Scene 5: The Copacabana, 1947, Evening

- "Dancing Fool" — Tony, Copa Boys
- "Night on the Town" – The Copa Girls

Scene 6: The Copacabana, Later that Night

Scene 7: Various Audition Rooms Around New York City, The Next Day

- "Audition Sequence" † — Lola, Tony, Male Auditioner, Jingle Singers

Scene 8: The Copacabana, Later that Day

- "Man Wanted" — Lola
- "Who Needs to Dream" — Tony, Women

Scene 9: Stephen's Studio, Present Day

Scene 10: The Copacabana, Several Nights Later / Havana, Later that Night

- "Ay Caramba" – Lola, Copa Girls
- "Just Arrived (Reprise)" † — Lola
- "Bolero De Amor" — Rico, Chorus

Act II

- "Entr'acte" † — Orchestra

Scene 1: The Copacabana, The Following Night

- "Sweet Heaven" ‡ – Tony, Copa Girls

Scene 2: Backstage at the Copa, Immediately Following

Scene 3: Backstage at the Copa, Immediately Following

- "Who Am I Kidding?" — Sam, Gladys, Doormen and Ensemble

Scene 4: A Bedroom in Rico's HavanaCompound, The Next Day / Stephen's Studio, Present Day

- "This Can't Be Real" — Lola, Stephen

Scene 5: The Tropicana Club in Havana, Later That Day

- "Welcome to Havana" – Conchita, Trop Boys

Scene 6: The Tropicana, Several Nights Later

- "The Mermaid's Tale" – The Mermaids
- "El Bravo" — Lola, Mermaids, Pirates and Pirettes

Scene 7: A beach on the outskirts of Havana, Later That Night

Scene 8: Stephen's Studio, Present Day

- "Who Needs To Dream? (Reprise)" – Stephen

Scene 9: The Copacabana, Finale Ultimo

- "Copacabana" – Company

† Does not appear on the Original London Cast Recording

‡ In previews, Act 2 opened with "Jump, Shout, Boogie" and "Sweet Heaven" took place in Act 2, Scene 7 with Tony, Lola and the Ensemble

=== 2000 United States version ===
Act I

- "Overture" — Orchestra

Scene 1: Somewhere in Stephen's Imagination / Stephen's Studio, Present Day

- "Copa Opening" — Stephen, Company

Scene 2: Grand Central Station, New York City, 1947

- "Just Arrived" — Lola, Women

Scene 3: The Copacabana, 1947, Evening

- "Dancing Fool" — Tony, Copa Boys
- "Sweet Heaven" — Tony, Copa Girls & Boys

Scene 4: Various Audition Rooms In New York, The Next Day

- "Audition Sequence" — Lola, Tony, Male Auditioner, Jingle Singers

Scene 5: Outside The Copa, Late Afternoon

- "Copa Girl" — Gladys

Scene 6: The Copacabana, Late Afternoon

- "Man Wanted" — Lola
- "Who Needs to Dream" — Tony, Women

Scene 7: The Copacabana, Several Weeks Later

- "Rico's Entrance" – Stephen
- "I Gotta Be Bad" — Lola, Copa Girls
- "Drunk Scene" — Lola
- "Bolero D'Amore" — Rico, Chorus

Act II

- "Entr'acte" — Orchestra

Scene 1: The Tropicana Nightclub, Havana

- "Havana/Caramba" — Conchita, Trop Boys & Girls

Scene 2: Backstage, The Copacabana

- "Kidding Preview" – Gladys, McManus, Willie, Sam, Tony
- "Who Am I Kidding?" — Sam, Willie, McManus, Gladys, Two Showgirls
- "Who Am I Kidding (Reprise)" — Gladys, Two Showgirls, Willie, McManus

Scene 3: A Bedroom in Rico's Compound, Havana

- "This Can't Be Real" — Lola, Stephen

Scene 4: The Stage of the Tropicana, Rehearsal, A Few Hours Later

Scene 5: The Tropicana Stage, Several Nights Later

- "El Bravo" — Lola, Trop Boys & Girls

Scene 6: The Tropicana Stage, Minutes Later / The Copa, A Few Days Later

- "Sweet Heaven (Reprise)" — Tony, Lola, Copa Girls & Boys
- "This Can't Be Real (Reprise)" — Tony

Scene 7: Stephen's Studio, Present Day

- "Finale Act Two" — Stephen, Company

Curtain Calls

- "Bows: Copacabana Finale" — Full Company

== Orchestration ==
Copacabana was orchestrated by Barry Manilow and Andy Rumble, with additional orchestrations by Artie Butler for the US production.

The London production features an orchestra of 12 – 2 reeds, 2 trumpets, trombone, 3 keyboards, drum set, percussion, guitar and bass.

The US production features an orchestra of 15 – 3 reeds, horn, 3 trumpets, 2 trombones, 3 keyboards, drum set, percussion, guitar and bass.

In both orchestrations, the conductor also plays one of the keyboard books.
